= St Lawrence for Pegwell Bay railway station =

Disused railway station in Kent, England

St Lawrence for Pegwell Bay
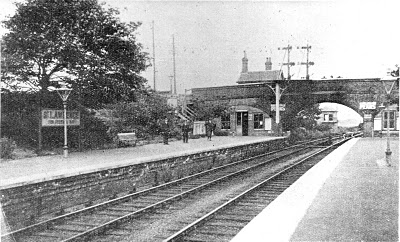
- Platforms and Newington Bridge with station building behind

General information
- Location: Ramsgate, District of Thanet; England
- Coordinates: 51.3405°N 1.4022°E
- Grid reference: TR 370 656
- Platforms: 2

Other information
- Status: Disused

History
- Original company: South Eastern Railway

Key dates
- October 1864: Station opened
- 3 April 1916: Station closed
Location

St Lawrence for Pegwell Bay railway station was a railway station at Ramsgate, Kent, England that was opened by the South Eastern Railway in 1864 and closed in 1916.

== History ==
Ramsgate was first reached by the South Eastern Railway (SER) on 13 April 1846 when it opened the extension of its line from Ashford and Canterbury to Ramsgate Town, continuing to Margate Sands on 1 December. In July 1863, the company had opened a 31 chains (620 m) spur (known as the St. Lawrence spur) to allow through running to Margate by avoiding the need to reverse at Ramsgate Town, a cramped and inconvenient station from which the line branched off to Margate at the very platform ends. In the event, the spur was little used by regular services. The building of the spur may be seen as a reaction to the arrival of a new competitor in the area, in the shape of the London, Chatham and Dover Railway (LCDR); the SER now felt the need to improve their services in the area, whereas for years operating as a monopoly they had not. Another major improvement completed in 1863 was the double-tracking of its route to Margate via Westwood.

Principally to cater for the very occasional train avoiding Ramsgate, a station was opened to the west of the spur by the Newington Road Bridge (now the B2014). The station opened in October 1864 and was named St Lawrence (Pegwell Bay) after nearby St Lawrence village which was swallowed up in the suburbs of Ramsgate in the early 20th century. The station was also shown as St Lawrence for Pegwell Bay in some timetables, and on the station nameboards, highlighting the proximity of Pegwell Bay. The two facing platforms were to the west of the bridge, while the station building was to the east. Offices were constructed in the two arches either side of the tracks.

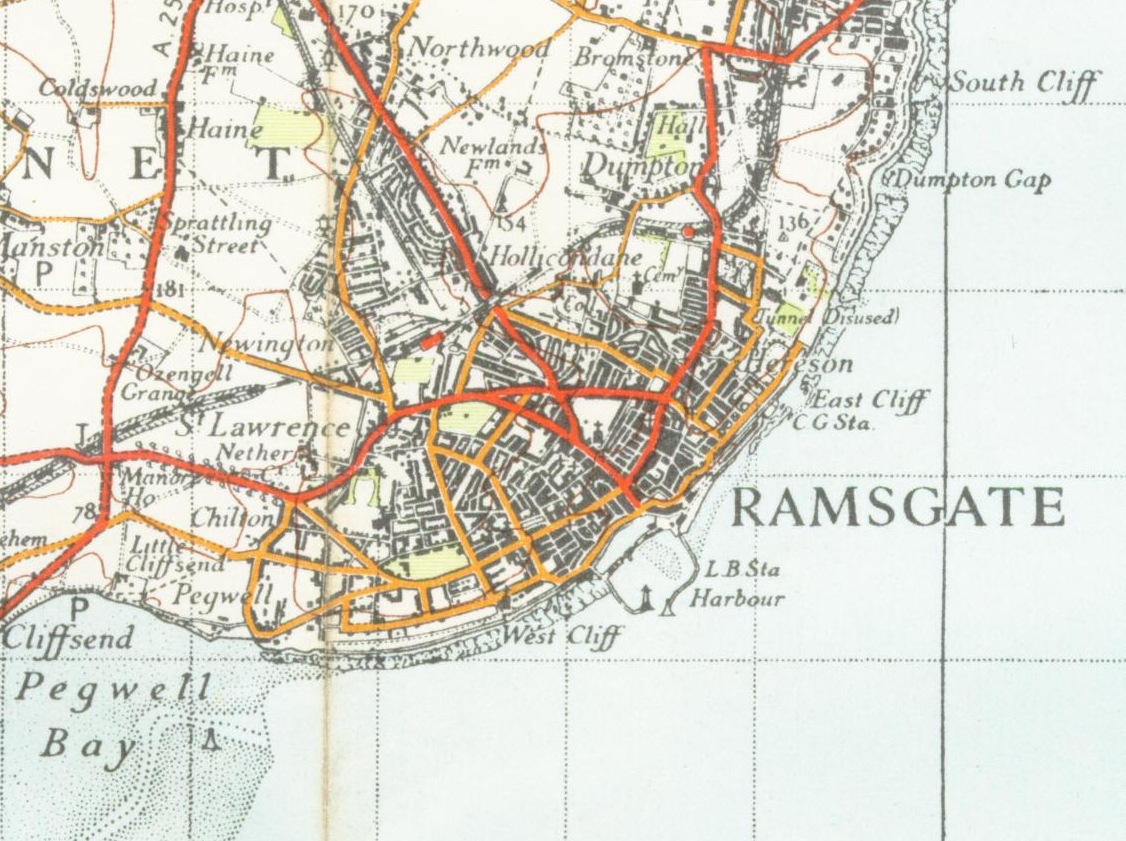
1945 Ordnance Survey map of Ramsgate. St Lawrence for Pegwell Bay station was located at the bridge immediately west of Ramsgate station.

From 1 January 1899, the station was operated by the South Eastern and Chatham Railway (SECR), which was formed out of the working union between the SER and the LCDR. The station was closed on 3 April 1916, the same day on which the SECR closed its stations at Battersea Park Road, Camberwell and Walworth Road and its platforms at Clapham High Street and Wandsworth Road, all never to reopen. St Lawrence, closed ostensibly as a war-time measure, never reopened probably because plans to rationalise the lines in Thanet had been in place since the turn of the century. The intervention of the First World War meant that it was left to the Southern Railway to realise the plans. On 2 July 1926, a new 1.375 mi (2.213 km) line was brought into use which diverged from the LCDR line on a 20 chains (400 m) curve from a point about 1 mile (1.6 km) to the south of Broadstairs station to join the SER line about 0.5 mi (0.80 km) to the west of Ramsgate near St Lawrence. The LCDR's line between Broadstairs and Ramsgate Harbour via Ramsgate Tunnel was closed, as was the SER's line from Ramsgate Town to Margate Sands.

The remains of St Lawrence station were demolished as part of the works. The works also involved the rebuilding of Newington Road Bridge, originally built in 1846. To the east of the station building stood a signal box for St.Lawrence Junction, the southern junction of the St.Lawrence spur. The northern junction (called Whitehall Junction) also had a signal box, just south of Whitehall Road.

Preceding station	Disused railways	Following station
Ebbsfleet and Cliffsend Halt; Line open, station closed	South Eastern Railway; Margate branch	Tivoli; Line and station closed
Ebbsfleet and Cliffsend Halt; Line open, station closed	South Eastern Railway; Ashford to Ramsgate line	Ramsgate Town; Line and station closed

== Sources ==
- Body, Geoffrey (1989) [1984]. PSL Field Guide: Railways of the Southern Region. Patrick Stephens Ltd. ISBN 1-85260-297-X.
- Butt, R.V.J. (1995). The Directory of Railway Stations. Sparkford, Somerset: Patrick Stephens Ltd. ISBN 978-1-85260-508-7.
- Clinker, C.R. (October 1978). Clinker's Register of Closed Passenger Stations and Goods Depots in England, Scotland and Wales 1830-1977. Bristol: Avon-Anglia Publications & Services. ISBN 0-905466-19-5.
- Course, Edwin Alfred (1973). The Railways of Southern England: The Main Lines. London: B.T. Batsford Ltd. ISBN 0-7134-0490-6.
- Dendy Marshall, C.F.; Kidner, R.W. (1963). History of the Southern Railway. Vol. 2. London: Ian Allan Ltd. ASIN B002BPGDAI.
- Gould, David (January 1981). The South Eastern & Chatham Railway in the 1914-18 War (No. 134). Tarrant Hinton: Oakwood Press. ISBN 0-85361-278-1.
- Gray, Adrian (1984). The London, Chatham and Dover Railway. Rainham: Meresborough Books. ISBN 978-0-905270-88-3.
- Gray, Adrian (November 1990). South Eastern Railway. Middleton Press. ISBN 978-0-906520-85-7.
- Kidner, R.W. (August 1978) [1963]. The South Eastern & Chatham Railway (OL53). Tarrant Hinton: Oakwood Press. ISBN 0-85361-232-3.
- Mitchell, Victor E.; Smith, Keith A. (June 1990). Dover to Ramsgate including the Margate Sands branch (South Coast Railways). Midhurst, West Sussex: Middleton Press. ISBN 978-0-906520-78-9.
- Mitchell, Victor E.; Smith, Keith A. (May 1991). Sittingbourne to Ramsgate (Southern Main Lines). Midhurst, West Sussex: Middleton Press. ISBN 978-0-906520-90-1.
- Richards, David (2008). Ramsgate All Change: Railways in the news at Ramsgate. Ramsgate: Michaels Bookshop. ISBN 978-1-907369-11-7.
- White, H.P. (1987) [1976]. Forgotten Railways: South-East England (Vol. 6). Newton Abbot, Devon: David & Charles. ISBN 978-0-946537-37-2.
- White, H.P. (1992) [1961]. A Regional History of the Railways of Great Britain: Southern England (Volume 2). Nairn, Scotland: David St John Thomas. ISBN 978-0-946537-77-8.
