= Margate East railway station =

Disused railway station in Margate, Kent

Margate East

General information
- Location: Margate, Kent; England
- Grid reference: TR 3492 7065
- Platforms: 2

Other information
- Status: Disused

History
- Original company: Kent Coast Railway

Key dates
- 5 October 1863: Opened
- 4 May 1953: Closed

Margate East was a railway station in Margate, Kent, United Kingdom. It opened in 1863 and was closed in 1953

== History ==
In 1857, the Herne Bay and Faversham Railway was granted approval to construct a 10 miles 48 chains (17.06 km) long railway line from Faversham to Herne Bay via Whitstable, despite severe opposition from the South Eastern Railway. In 1859, permission was granted to extend to Margate and the company changed its name to the Margate and London Railway. It was arranged that the London, Chatham and Dover Railway would work the line. By 1861, permission had been granted to extend to Ramsgate, and a further change of name to the Kent Coast Railway had taken place. The line between Herne Bay and Ramsgate opened on 5 October 1863.

Margate East was 24.5 miles (39.43 km) from Faversham, and thus about 76.5 miles (123.11 km) from London Victoria station. In July 1922, service was six trains per day from London, and five trains per day to London. Margate East was closed in 1953

Preceding station	Disused railways	Following station
Margate West; Line and station open	London, Chatham and Dover Railway; Chatham Main Line	Ramsgate Harbour; Line and station closed
