= Broadstairs railway station =

Railway station in Kent, England

Coordinates: 51°21′38″N 1°26′1″E

Broadstairs
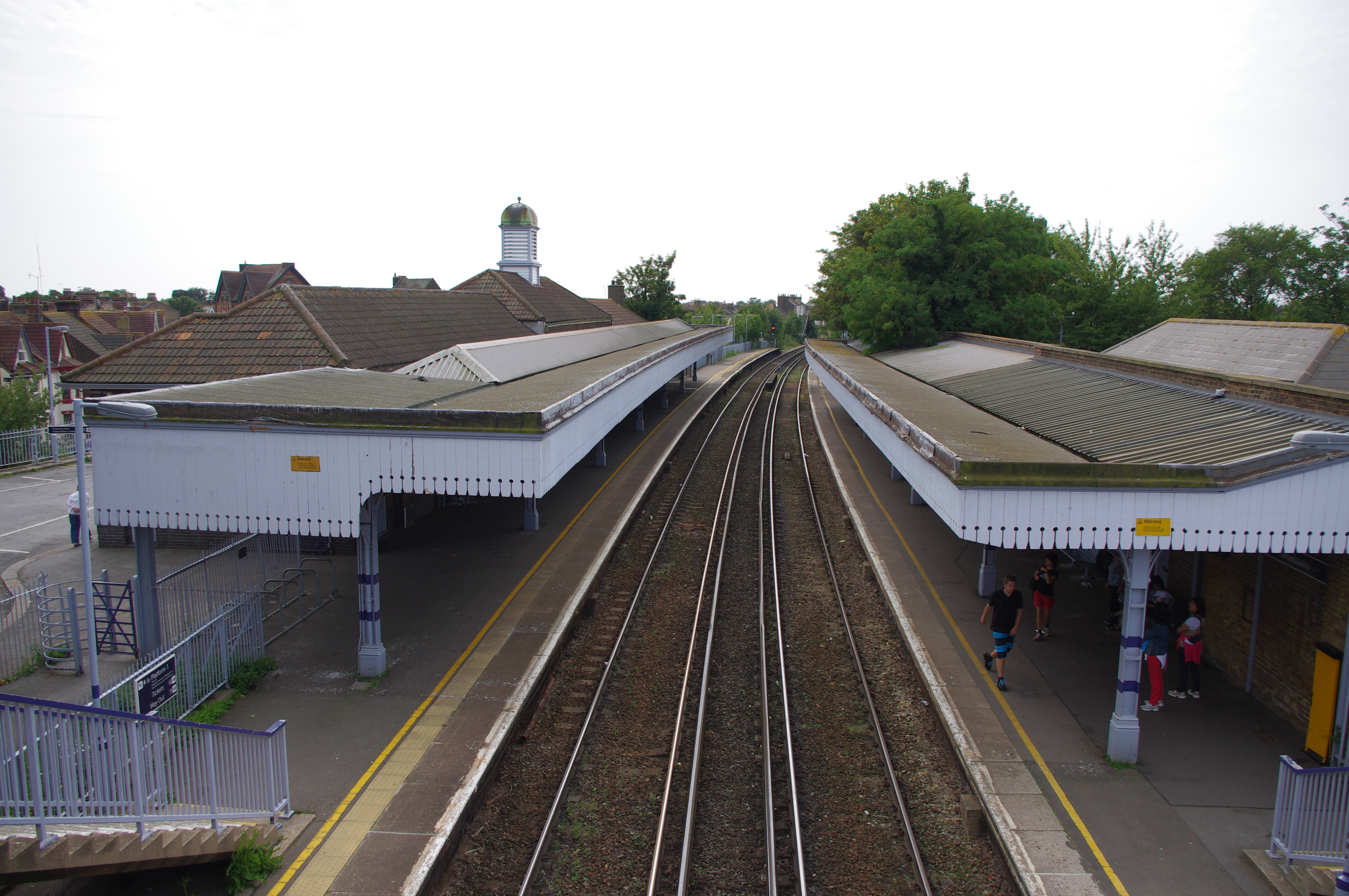
- Southbound view of platforms from station footbridge

General information
- Location: Broadstairs, District of Thanet; England
- Grid reference: TR391679
- Managed by: Southeastern
- Platforms: 2

Other information
- Station code: BSR
- Classification: DfT category E

History
- Opened: 5 October 1863

Passengers
- 2020/21: ▼0.188 million
- 2021/22: ▲0.495 million
- 2022/23: ▲0.631 million
- 2023/24: ▲0.714 million
- 2024/25: ▲0.794 million
Location
Notes
- Passenger statistics from the Office of Rail and Road

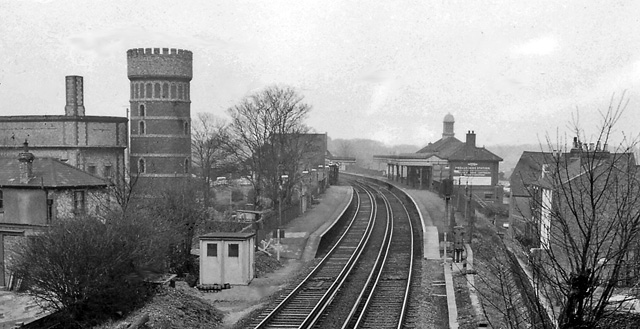
View NNW, towards Margate in 1963. Crampton Tower on the left

Broadstairs railway station is on the Chatham Main Line in England, serving the seaside town of Broadstairs, Kent. It is 77 miles 9 chains (124 km) down the line from London Victoria and is situated between Margate and Dumpton Park.

The station and all trains that serve the station are operated by Southeastern. Trains to London can run either way through the station, depending on the route either via Margate or Ramsgate.

== History ==
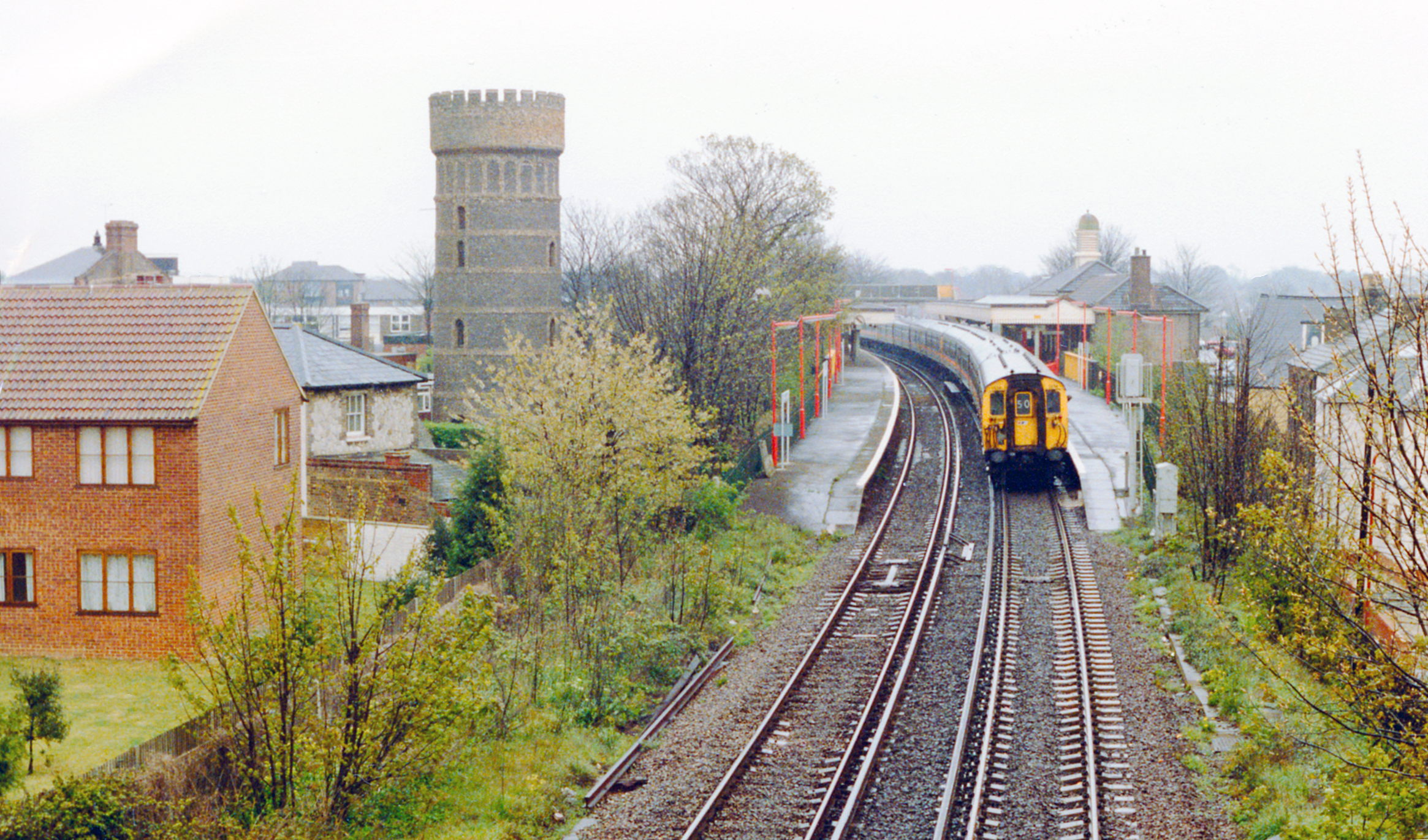
Broadstairs station under British Rail with two Class 411s in 'Jaffa cake' livery in 1990.

The first proposal for a station at Broadstairs was by the South Eastern Railway (SER) in November 1859, who wanted to extend their existing station at Ramsgate towards Broadstairs at an estimated cost of £20,000. However, the scheme was refused permission by the station master at Ramsgate.

Instead, the station was built by the Kent Coast Railway as part of an extension from Margate to Ramsgate Harbour. It opened on 5 October 1863. From the beginning, the line was operated by the London, Chatham & Dover Railway (LCDR), who bought the Kent Coast Railway on 1 July 1871.

The station was run by the Southern Railway (SR) following the Railways Act 1921. Having inherited lines from the LCDR and SER, the SR decided to simplify services by constructing a new line linking Broadstairs directly to the current Ramsgate station, thus joining the stations together and forming a loop along Kent. This opened on 2 July 1926.

Electric services began at Broadstairs on 15 June 1959. Goods services were withdrawn from the station on 3 June 1963. A high-speed service to London St Pancras began on 13 December 2009.

== Incidents ==
In 2015, a woman was killed by a train at the station.

== Services ==
All services at Broadstairs are operated by Southeastern using Class 375 and 395 EMUs.

The typical off-peak service in trains per hour is:

- 1 tph to London St Pancras International via Chatham and Gravesend
- 1 tph to London St Pancras International via Ramsgate and Canterbury West
- 1 tph to London Victoria via Chatham
- 1 tph to Margate
- 2 tph to Ramsgate

Additional services including trains to and from London Bridge and London Cannon Street call at the station in the peak hours.

Preceding station	National Rail	Following station
Margate	Southeastern Chatham Main Line - Ramsgate Branch	Dumpton Park
Margate	Southeastern High Speed 1	Ramsgate
	Disused railways	
Margate East Line open, station closed	London, Chatham & Dover Railway Chatham Main Line – Ramsgate Branch	Ramsgate Harbour Line and station closed
