= Margate railway station =

Railway station in Kent, England

Coordinates: 51°23′7.04″N 1°22′19.85″E

Margate
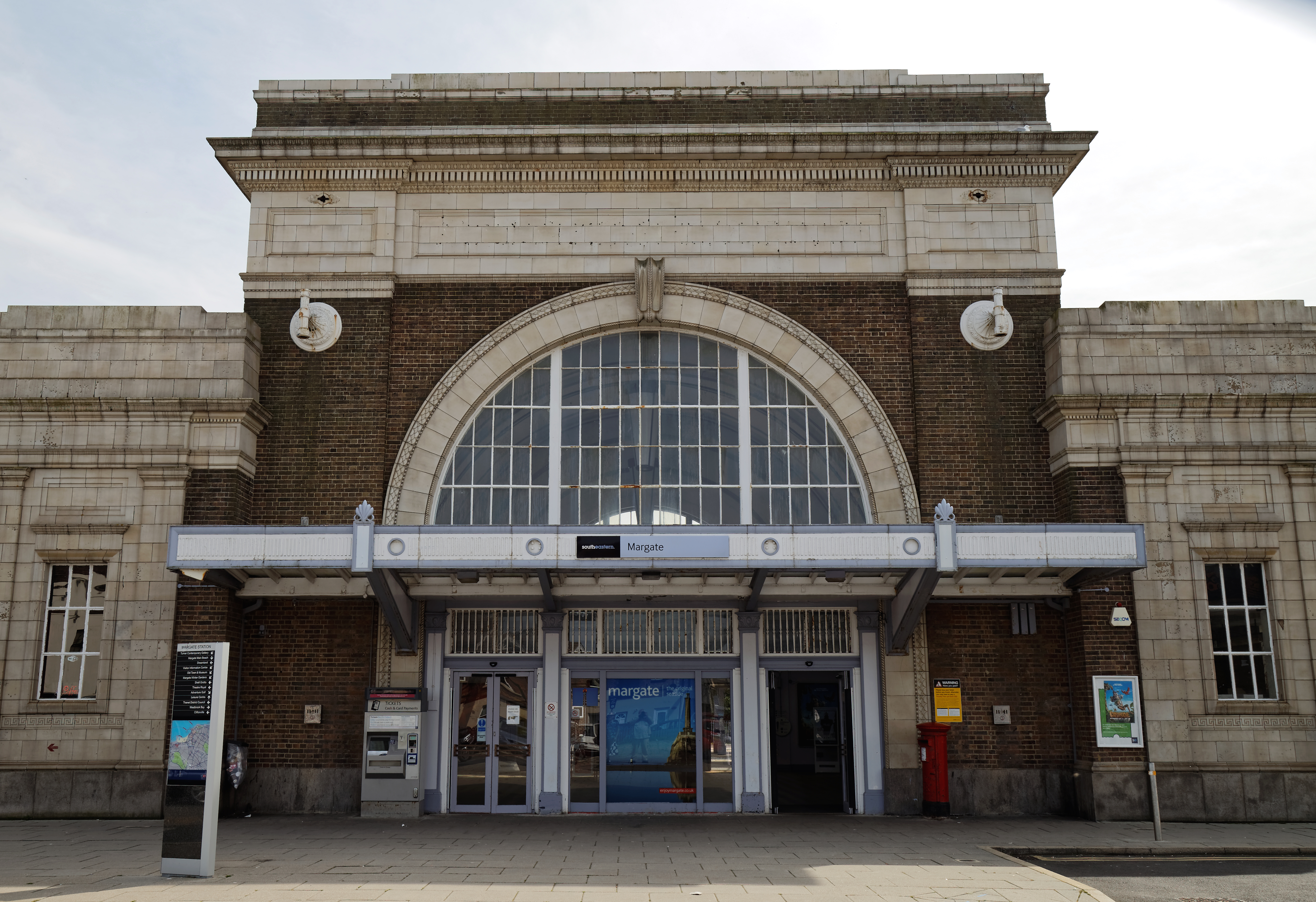

General information
- Location: Margate, District of Thanet; England
- Grid reference: TR347705
- Manager: Southeastern
- Platforms: 4

Other information
- Station code: MAR
- Classification: DfT category D

History
- Opened: 5 October 1863

Passengers
- 2021/22: ▲0.884 million
- Interchange: ▲4,197
- 2022/23: ▲1.026 million
- Interchange: ▲8,333
- 2023/24: ▲1.157 million
- Interchange: ▲9,367
- 2024/25: ▲1.287 million
- Interchange: ▼9,245
- 2025/26: ▲1.392 million
- Interchange: ▲10,181

Listed Building – Grade II
- Feature: Margate Railway Station
- Designated: 25 August 1987
- Reference no.: 1260321
Location
Notes
- Passenger statistics from the Office of Rail and Road

Margate railway station serves the town of Margate in Thanet, Kent, England. It is 73 miles 69 chains (118.9 km) down the line from London Victoria, between Westgate-on-Sea and Broadstairs. The station and all trains that serve the station are operated by Southeastern. Trains from the station generally run to Victoria via Chatham or to London St Pancras via Ramsgate, Canterbury West and Ashford International.

== History ==
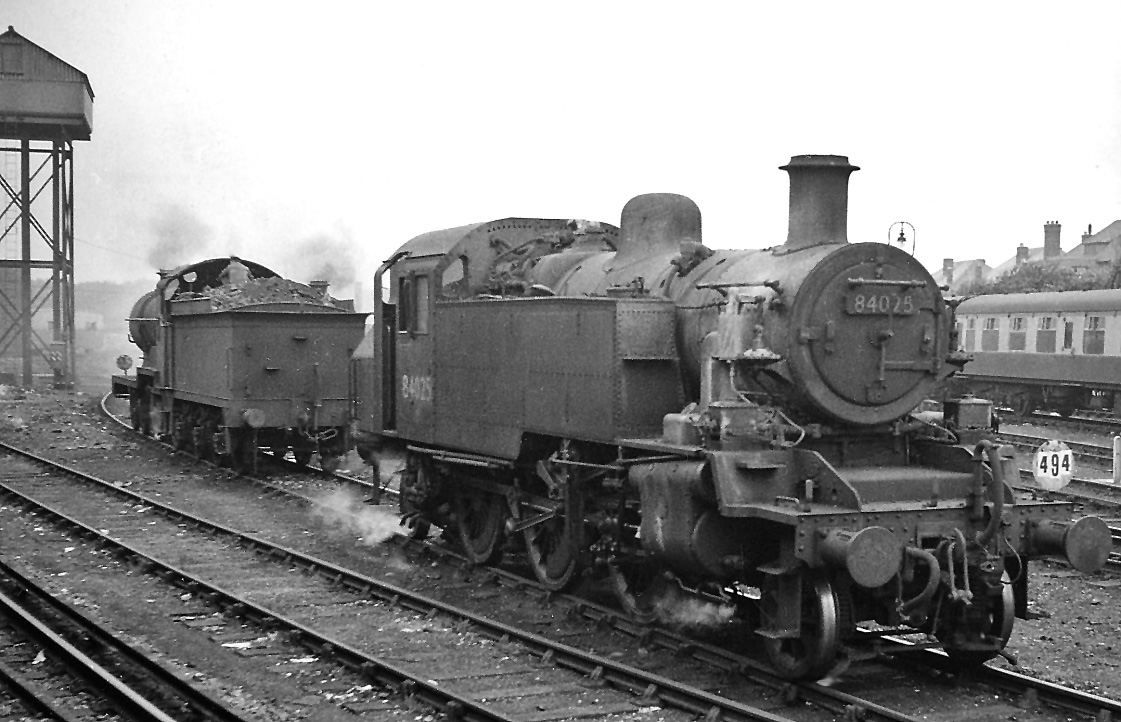
BR Standard 2-6-2T at Margate in 1958

Trains first reached Ramsgate in April 1846 when the South Eastern Railway (SER) opened a line from Canterbury. It terminated at Ramsgate SER, later to be called Ramsgate Town. Later the same year, the line opened across Thanet to Margate, to Margate SER, (later Margate Sands). Trains from Canterbury for Margate had to reverse at Ramsgate Town; a chord was built bypassing the station in 1864, costing £13,707. St Lawrence for Pegwell Bay railway station was opened in 1864 just before this chord but closed in 1916.

The London Chatham & Dover Railway (LCDR) reached Margate from Herne Bay on 5 October 1863. This called at Margate (the current station), East Margate, Broadstairs and terminated at Ramsgate (later Ramsgate Harbour), located near the harbour and beach.

The station was opened as Margate, then renamed Margate & Cliftonville in 1880, Margate West from 1 June 1899, before reverting to Margate on 11 July 1926.

== Architecture ==
The station was rebuilt in 1926 by the Southern Railway's chief assistant architect, Edwin Maxwell Fry. The building is constructed in a monumental classical style from brown brick with a stone dressing and a hipped tiled roof. The booking hall was built in a similar manner, in a distinctive ellipse shape with pendant lighting. It was Grade II listed in 1987.

== Facilities ==
The station has a ticket office and ticket machines, toilets, departure information screens and a shop. There is a car park and cycle storage available.

== Passenger volume ==
Passenger Volume at Margate
	2002–03	2004–05	2005–06	2006–07	2007–08	2008–09	2009–10	2010–11	2011–12	2012–13	2013–14	2014–15	2015–16	2016–17	2017–18	2018–19	2019–20	2020–21	2021–22	2022–23
Entries and exits	563,456	584,569	595,453	660,439	671,790	653,152	600,128	605,626	648,308	619,974	627,180	678,986	829,222	892,924	1,007,956	1,113,676	1,139,966	353,114	884,110	1,025,940
Interchanges	– (Note: No data available.)	9,236	11,013	6,737	9,582	11,693	1,399	3,078	1,930	2,132	2,148	2,404	6,258	6,683	7,285	8,233	7,817	1,157	4,197	8,333

The statistics cover twelve month periods that start in April.

== Services ==
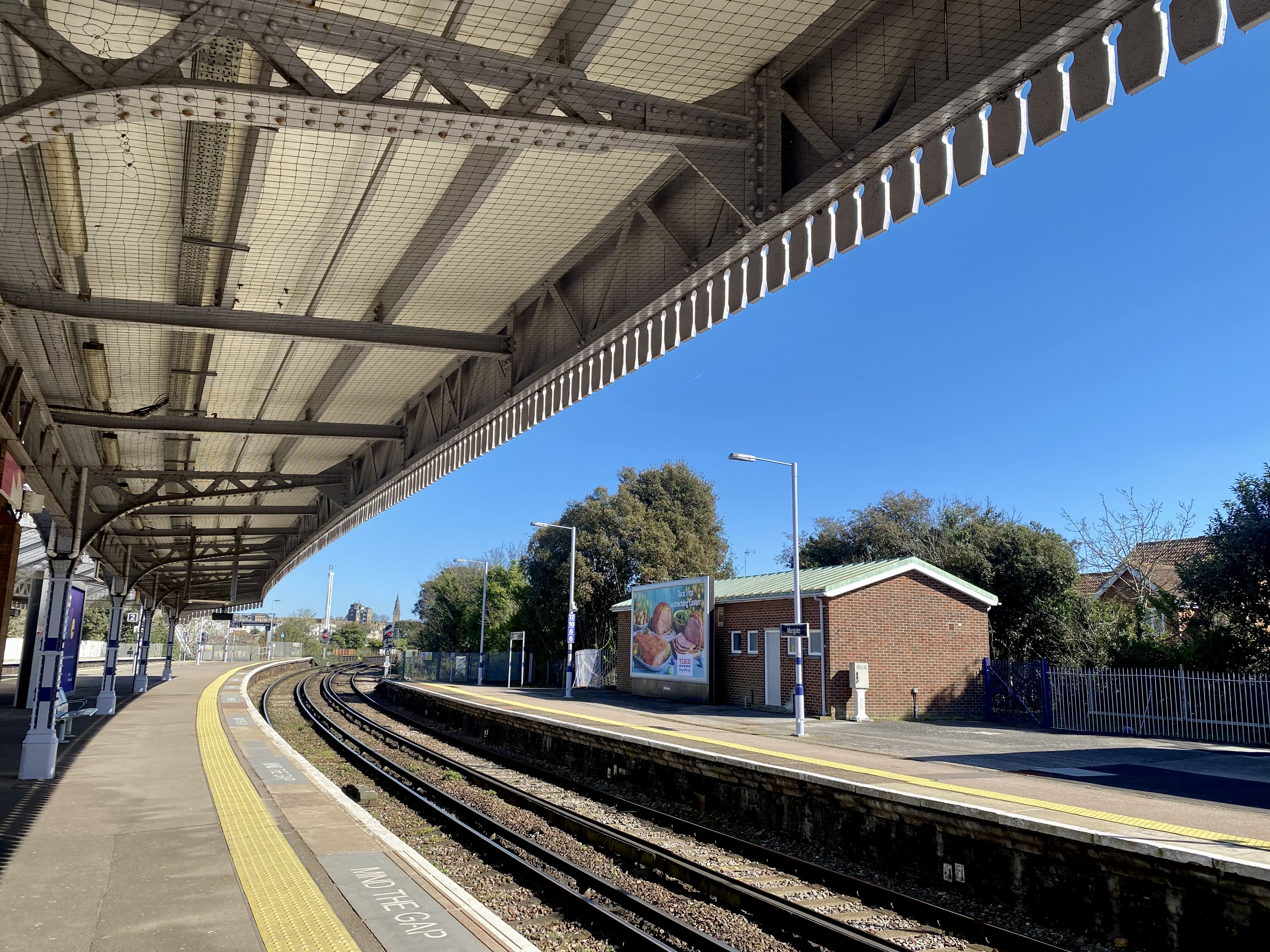
Platform view

The typical off-peak service in trains per hour is:

- 1 tph to London St Pancras International via Chatham and Gravesend
- 1 tph to London St Pancras International via Ramsgate and Canterbury West
- 1 tph to London Victoria via Chatham
- 2 tph to Ramsgate

Additional services including trains to and from London Bridge and London Cannon Street call at the station in the peak hours.

Preceding station	National Rail	Following station
Westgate-on-Sea	Southeastern Chatham Main Line - Ramsgate Branch	Broadstairs
Birchington-on-Sea	Southeastern High Speed 1	Broadstairs
Terminus	Southeastern High Speed 1	Broadstairs
	Disused railways	
Westgate-on-Sea; Line and station open	London, Chatham and Dover Railway; Chatham Main Line	Margate East; Line open, station closed

== Cultural references ==
The station was featured in Only Fools and Horses, in the 1989 episode The Jolly Boys' Outing. Del Boy and Rodney discover the station is closed due to a strike, after being stuck in Margate following their coach blowing up.

== Bibliography ==
- Gray, Adrian (1990). South Eastern Railway. Middleton Press. ISBN 978-0-906520-85-7.
- McCarthy, Colin; McCarthy, David (2007). Railways of Britain : Kent and Sussex. Ian Allan Publishing. ISBN 978-0-7110-3222-4.
- Quick, Michael (2023). Railway Passenger Stations in Great Britain: A Chronology (PDF) (5th ed.). London: Railway and Canal Historical Society.
