= Tunnel Railway =

Narrow-gauge underground railway in Ramsgate, Kent, England

Coordinates: 51.334°N 1.418°E

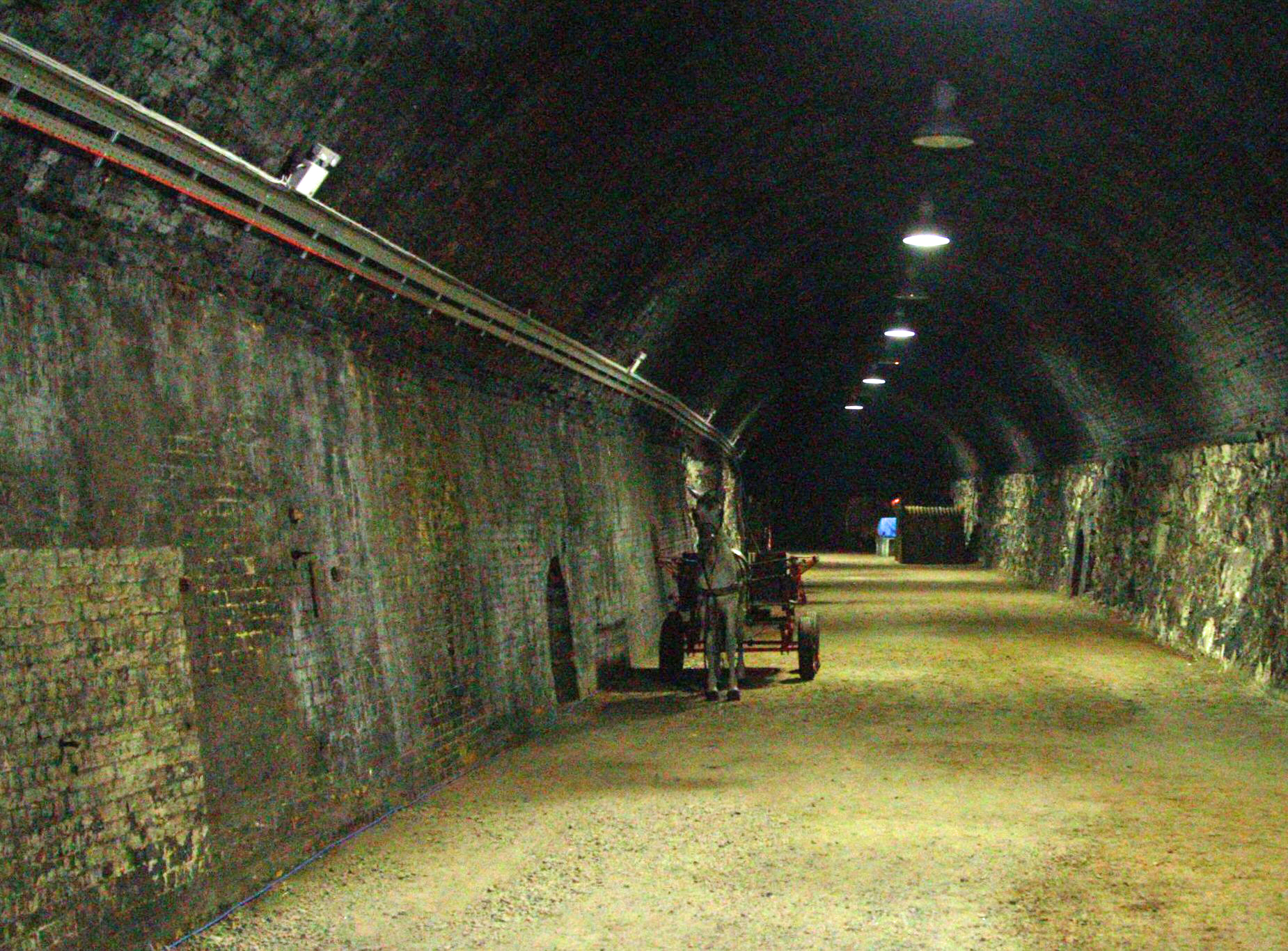
- The main tunnel entrance of the Ramsgate Tunnels at the official reopening in 2014

Overview
- Status: Closed
- Owner: Ramsgate Olympia
- Locale: Ramsgate
- Termini: Ramsgate beach; Hereson Road (for Dumpton Park)
- Stations: 2

Service
- Type: Narrow gauge

History
- Opened: 31 July 1936
- Closed: 26 September 1965

Technical
- Line length: 1,444 yards (1,320 m)
- Number of tracks: 1
- Track gauge: 2 ft (610 mm)
- Electrification: 400-volt DC using trolley pole
- Highest elevation: 83 feet (25 m)

The Tunnel Railway (also known as the Ramsgate Cliff Railway, the Ramsgate Tunnel Railway, the Ramsgate Underground Railway and the World Scenic Railway) was a 2 ft (610 mm) narrow-gauge underground railway in Ramsgate, Kent, England.

Following the restructuring of railway lines in Ramsgate in 1926, the section of line between Broadstairs and Ramsgate Harbour including a tunnel to the seafront at Ramsgate was abandoned. The narrow-gauge Tunnel Railway was opened within the disused tunnel in 1936 to connect tourist attractions and shops near Ramsgate harbour with the new railway main line at Dumpton Park.

Except for its two stations—one at each end of the tunnel—the line ran entirely underground. The line was built in less than three months, and on its completion in 1936 was one of the shortest independent railway lines in the country. It was open for only three years before being converted to a major air-raid shelter during World War II. After the war's end, it was not included in the 1948 nationalisation of British railways but remained in private hands.

Passenger numbers fell during the 1960s, and the line became economically unviable. Following a train crash in 1965, the owners closed the line at the end of September that year. The tunnel still exists, but no trace remains of either of the two stations.

== Background ==
The full extent of the railway network in Kent, showing the twin lines from London to Ramsgate and Margate

The coastal resort and port town of Ramsgate was historically served by a complex network of unconnected railway lines, the legacy of competition between two rival companies to provide links to London and to neighbouring Margate. The town's first railway station, Ramsgate Town, was opened by the South Eastern Railway on 13 April 1846, on what was then the outskirts of the town, about a mile from the seafront. Lines from the station ran north, before splitting west to Canterbury and on to London, and north to Margate.

The London, Chatham and Dover Railway opened a second line to Ramsgate on 5 October 1863. (Note: Although built and owned by the Kent Coast Railway, it was operated from the start by the London, Chatham and Dover Railway. The Kent Coast Railway was formally absorbed by the London, Chatham and Dover Railway on 13 July 1871.) This line ran from London via Herne Bay, Margate and Broadstairs before descending to sea level at Ramsgate through a 1,124-yard (1,028 m) tunnel to Ramsgate Harbour station, on the seafront immediately adjacent to the harbour.

Although very conveniently sited for passengers, Ramsgate Harbour station presented severe operating difficulties. Its situation at the end of a steep gradient in the tunnel meant there was the constant risk that an out-of-control train would run through the station onto the beach, as happened on 3 August 1891 and 24 March 1915. Cramped conditions allowed no room for station growth or improvement, and the small turntable meant larger engines could not be used, so heavier trains needed two engines to haul them up the tunnel's gradient. Additionally, by the 1920s the population of Ramsgate had almost doubled since the station had opened, making the freight facilities inadequate, with no room for expansion.

=== 1926 restructuring ===
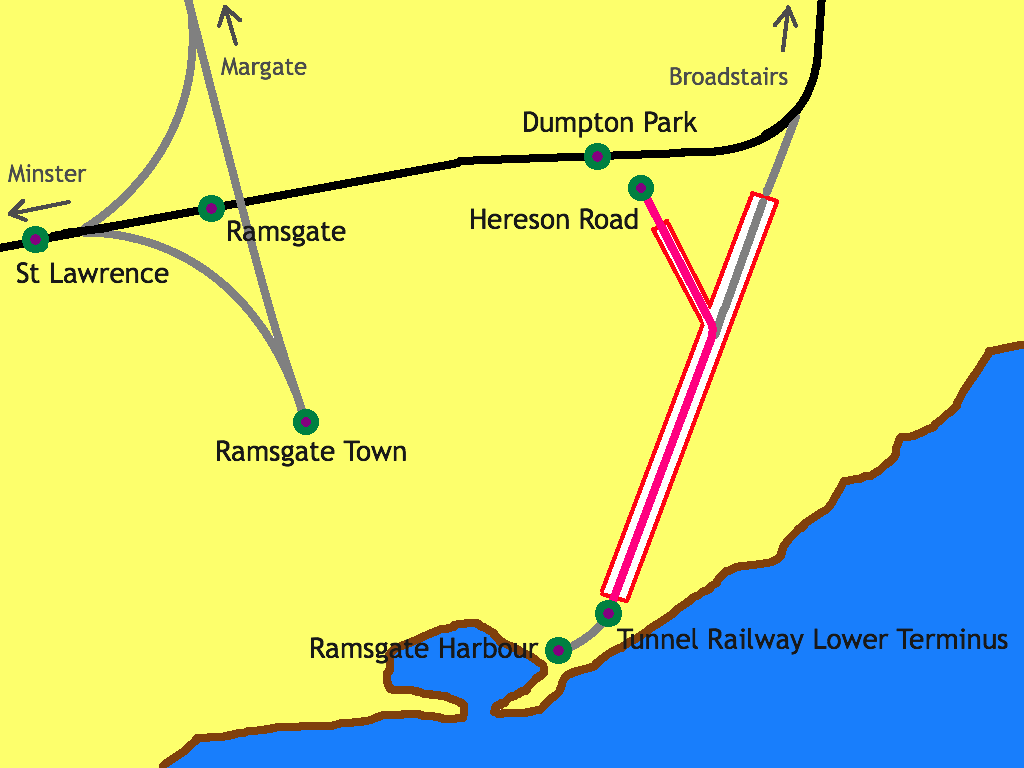
Layout of pre- and post-1926 lines and stations in Ramsgate

Following the railway grouping of 1923, both the South Eastern Railway and the London, Chatham & Dover Railway became part of the newly formed Southern Railway, which decided to address the duplication of lines and stations at Ramsgate and Margate. It decided to link the two lines at Ramsgate to allow through running between them. This scheme had been proposed by the South Eastern and Chatham Railway before World War I, but work did not commence until 1925. This meant the closure of the terminus stations at Ramsgate Town and Ramsgate Harbour, and the construction of a line skirting the northern edge of the town to link the two existing lines.

New stations on the northeastern and northwestern fringes of the town, called Dumpton Park and Ramsgate respectively, replaced the existing stations in the town centre and at the harbour. Construction work on the new line involved over 700 men moving 200,000 long tons (224,000 short tons; 203,200 t) of chalk, at a cost of approximately £500,000 (£36 million in 2023).

The new link opened on 2 July 1926, from which date both former Ramsgate stations were closed along with the line through the tunnel to Ramsgate Harbour. The tunnel was sealed and abandoned, and the former Ramsgate Harbour station was sold to Thanet Amusements, who converted it into a zoo and funfair called Merrie England.

Although adequate for the town's residents the new stations were a long way from the seafront attractions, which were at the foot of a steep hill. The day-trippers on whom Ramsgate's tourist industry depended were therefore increasingly attracted to Margate, where the station was next to the beach.

By 1933 Merrie England, now under the ownership of Ramsgate Olympia, had become extremely popular, and Ramsgate Olympia began to lobby the Southern Railway to reopen the line through the tunnel, with a new junction station between Dumpton Park and Broadstairs. However, the Southern Railway rejected the proposal as too costly and impractical. (Note: The new Dumpton Park station and Broadstairs station were less than a mile apart; a junction station between the two would have meant trains stopping three times within a mile, causing delays and tailbacks, while running trains from the harbour to Dumpton Park or Broadstairs would have caused severe congestion.) Ramsgate Olympia and the Southern Railway were keen to make the attractions near the harbour accessible from the railway main line and to provide a service from the seafront to Dumpton Park stadium for Greyhound racing.

The two companies eventually agreed on a scheme by which a new line would use the 780 yards (710 m) of the tunnel nearest the beach, before branching off into a new 364-yard (333 m) tunnel to emerge at a new station at Hereson Road, a 250-yard (230 m) walk from Dumpton Park station. Ramsgate Olympia planned the construction of a large-scale housing estate, charabanc parking facilities, and a 10,000-seat stadium at Dumpton Park to increase passenger numbers and encourage people to use the new rail line.

=== Route ===
Trains at the lower station, immediately outside the tunnel entrance

The stations each had three platforms; a broad island platform in the centre for passengers waiting to board trains, and narrower outer platforms from which passengers exited the trains. Although the upper station was known as Hereson Road from the outset, the lower station was never officially named. It was known at various times as "Olympia", "Beach", "Sands" and "Lower Terminus". The platforms and ticket offices were immediately outside the mouth of the tunnel at both stations.

The line ran between Hereson Road, across the road from Dumpton Park station, down a steep gradient of 1 in 15 in the new tunnel, before running at a 1 in 75 gradient down the original tunnel to the lower terminus. The line consisted of a single line, branching into two platform tracks at the two stations, with a crossing loop halfway along the tunnel. Over the 1,444-yard (1,320 m) journey between Hereson Road and the lower terminus, the line descended 83 feet (25 m).

=== Construction and infrastructure ===
The new line's infrastructure was designed by Henry Greenly, a leading figure in the design of narrow gauge railways. He had begun his career at the Metropolitan Railway (now part of the London Underground), and had designed the route, buildings, locomotives and rolling stock for the Rhyl Miniature Railway and the nearby Romney, Hythe and Dymchurch Railway. As the new railway would not be carrying heavy loads and would be travelling only a short distance, it was built as a narrow gauge railway, with a track gauge of 2 ft. This allowed the new branch tunnel to be built to far smaller dimensions than the existing tunnel, at just 8 feet (2.4 m) high and 6 feet (1.8 m) wide.

Although a cable haulage system had initially been considered, Ramsgate Olympia decided early in the line's planning to electrify the line. A third rail system was rejected due to concerns for the safety of the large numbers of children expected to use the line, and the locomotives had trolley poles drawing power from a single 400-volt DC overhead line running the length of the tunnel. The wire ran along the wall of the old tunnel, on brackets in the roof of the new tunnel, and was supported by poles at the open-air stations. The electricity was supplied by an electrical substation built by English Electric, inside the tunnel near the lower end.

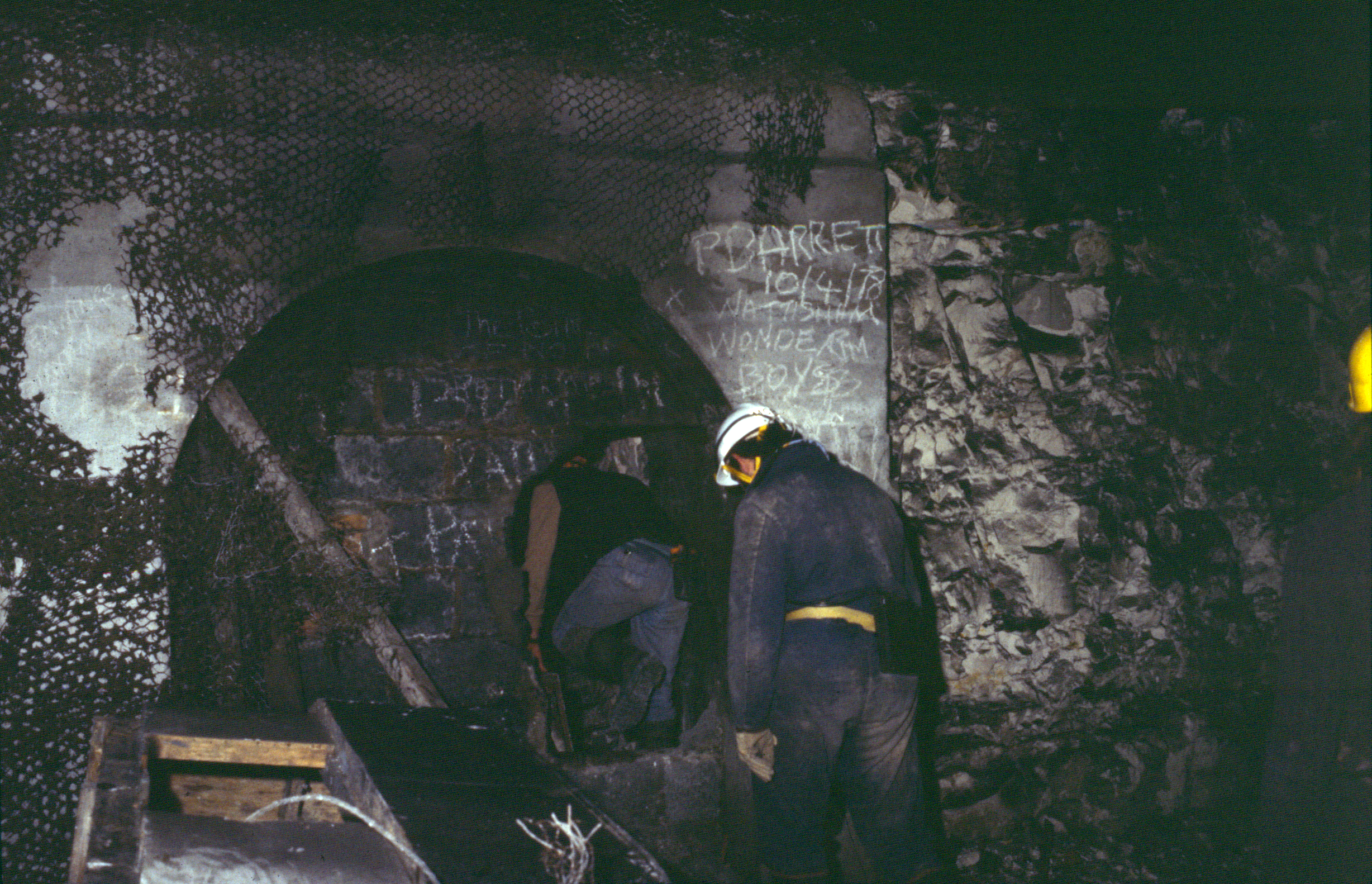
The junction of the main tunnel and the narrow tunnel to Hereson Road in 1984, 19 years after closure

Construction work began on 2 May 1936. The company hoped to have the line open in time to serve the large crowds expected on the August Bank Holiday, leading to a very tight construction deadline of three months. To try to meet the deadline, construction work was carried out both day and night. As the journey would take place entirely underground it was decided to line the wider, original tunnel with illuminated displays showing scenes from around the world. This led to the line becoming semi-officially known as the "World Scenic Railway".

English Electric built two trains for the line, designed to resemble the electric trains already in use on the Southern Railway, but on a smaller scale. A 94 ft 6 in (28.80 m) four-car train, painted red, was capable of carrying 108 passengers, and had a driver's cab at each end to avoid the need to turn the train around. A 99 ft 6 in (30.33 m) train, painted yellow, was also able to carry 108 passengers, but had two extra driver's cabs in the centre, allowing it to be split into two separate 49 ft 9 in (15.16 m) trains, each capable of carrying 54 passengers. It was envisaged that when the line was busy both trains would be used, but during quiet periods the line could be operated by the two-halves of the yellow train. The red train was modified so that it could also be split, reducing its capacity to 102 as the two rows of seats at the centre were replaced by driver's cabs.

=== Opening ===
The line opened to passengers on 31 July 1936, less than 12 weeks after construction began. It was formally opened by Lieutenant-Colonel Edwin Charles Cox, Traffic Manager of the Southern Railway, who commented that as the traffic manager of what was then the largest electric rail service in the world, he was now opening what was probably the smallest. Initially, the tunnel was decorated with illuminated scenes depicting Switzerland, Canada, the Netherlands, Japan and Egypt.

The railway proved very popular, and over the Bank Holiday weekend carried 20,000 passengers. As it relied on the tourist trade for business, it closed at the end of September. Throughout the 1937, 1938, and 1939 seasons the railway operated between Whitsun and the end of September each year, closing for the autumn and winter.

The railway never had a timetable, and operated according to demand. Whenever one station had a sufficient number of passengers the driver signalled to the other station that he was about to depart, and the trains from both stations would set off simultaneously, passing at the halfway crossing loop. The journey took approximately five minutes. Outside of times of peak demand the full-length trains were generally not used, and the trains used split into their two-car sections. There was no depot: trains were stabled in the lower section of the tunnel.

== Wartime ==
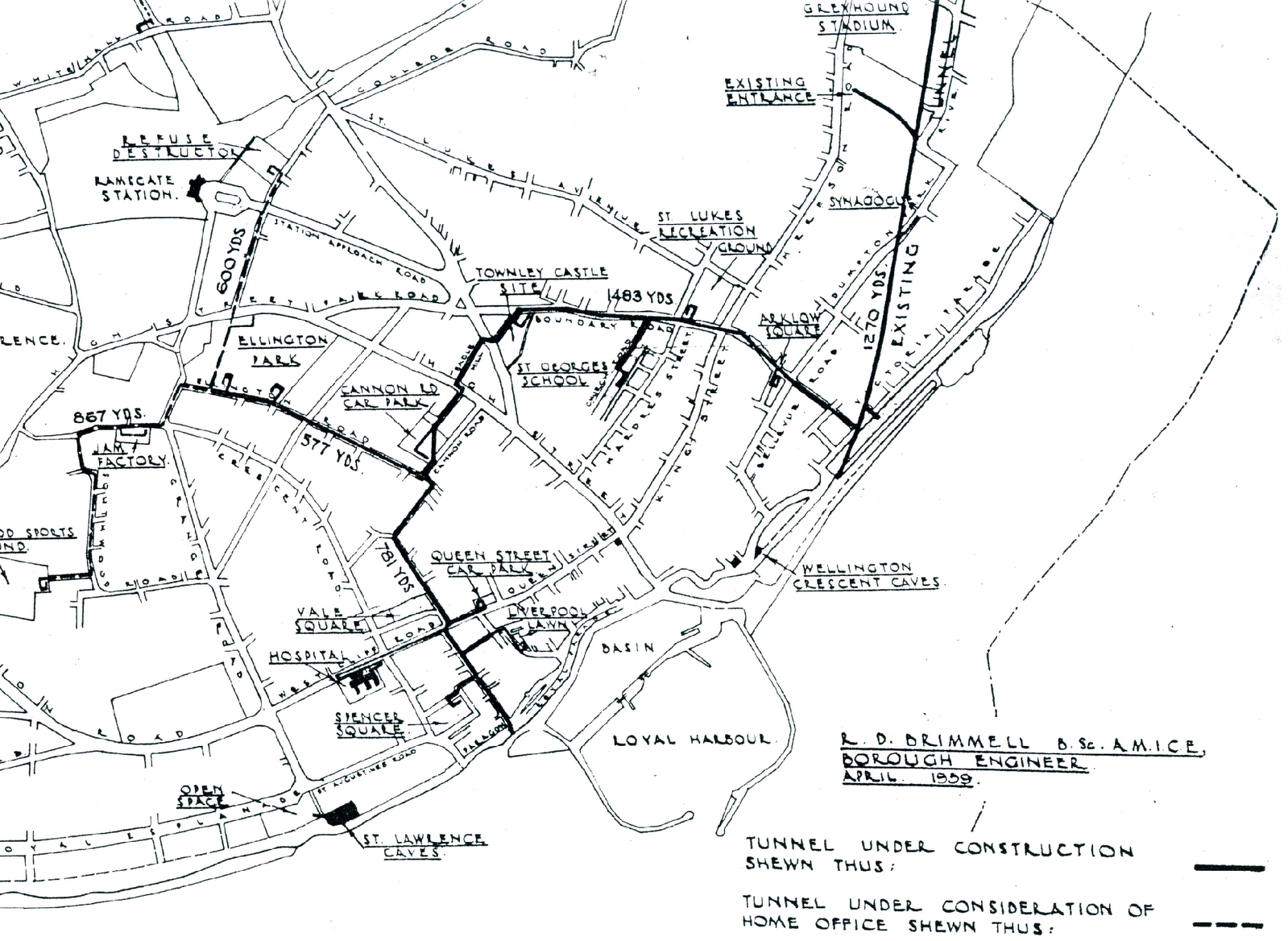
The Ramsgate air-raid shelter tunnel network, April 1939

In the late 1930s, war between Britain and Germany began to seem likely. Ramsgate's location on both the English Channel and North Sea and its proximity to the Thames Estuary, its large port facilities, and its close proximity to RAF Manston made it a likely target for heavy aerial bombing and as a landing site for any German invasion of Britain. With this in mind the town's borough engineer and surveyor, R. D. Brimmell, devised a scheme in 1938 for a network of tunnels beneath the town, to serve as a vast deep-level air-raid shelter for the town's inhabitants.

A 3 1/4-mile (5.2 km) semi-circular network of tunnels was dug beneath northern Ramsgate, connecting to the existing railway tunnel. It was opened by the Duke of Kent on 1 June 1939, three months before the outbreak of war, and visited during the war by Winston Churchill. The network was capable of sheltering 60,000 people, although Ramsgate's civilian population at the time was approximately 33,000.

== Post-war operations ==
The Tunnel Railway reopened for the 1946 season as usual. The illuminated tableaux had been removed during the war but were replaced, but this time they were illuminated by floodlights fitted to the sides of the trains rather than being self illuminated. The line was not included in the 1948 nationalisation of the railways and so remained in the hands of Ramsgate Olympia (later Pleasurama). The tableaux were removed around 1955 due to increasing vandalism, and the station signage changed from World Scenic Railway to Tunnel Railway.

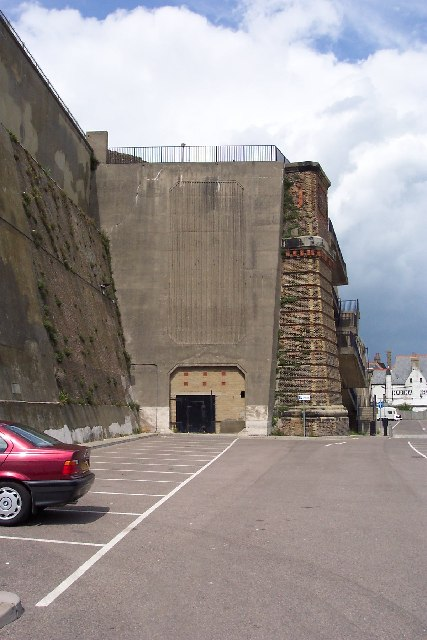
Site of the former "Merrie England" and the Tunnel Railway lower terminus, 2004

Part of the chalk cliff near the lower terminus collapsed in 1957, forcing the railway's closure while a strengthening concrete wall was built. The new wall reduced the lower terminus to a single length of track. The second track at Hereson Road was closed at the same time, and removed to build a short siding near the bottom of the tunnel for stabling the trains. The wooden station platforms were replaced by modern concrete structures.

At 2:15 pm on 1 July 1965, one of the two-car yellow trains lost control while approaching the lower terminus and ran off the end of the rails before smashing into a building. The driver and several passengers were injured. The station was repaired and services were resumed, but Pleasurama closed the line on 26 September 1965.

== After the closure ==
After closure the tunnel was sealed, although it remained structurally intact inside. The site of the lower terminus was cleared and became an empty site surrounded by a construction hoarding. There was a small roundabout directly outside the south portal of the tunnel. Hereson Road station became used-car dealership. Four of the railway's carriages were sold to the Hollycombe Steam Collection and remain in use, while the other three were given to the Hampshire Narrow Gauge Railway Society. Most of the rails and sleepers were sold to the Romney, Hythe and Dymchurch Railway.

Following three years of renovation, the lower section of the tunnel was reopened to the public in 2014 as part of the Ramsgate Tunnels tourist attraction. The tunnels were formally reopened by Prince Edward, Duke of Kent in a ceremony on 27 May 2014.
