= Dumpton Park railway station =

Railway station in Kent, England

Coordinates: 51°20′45″N 1°25′33″E

Dumpton Park
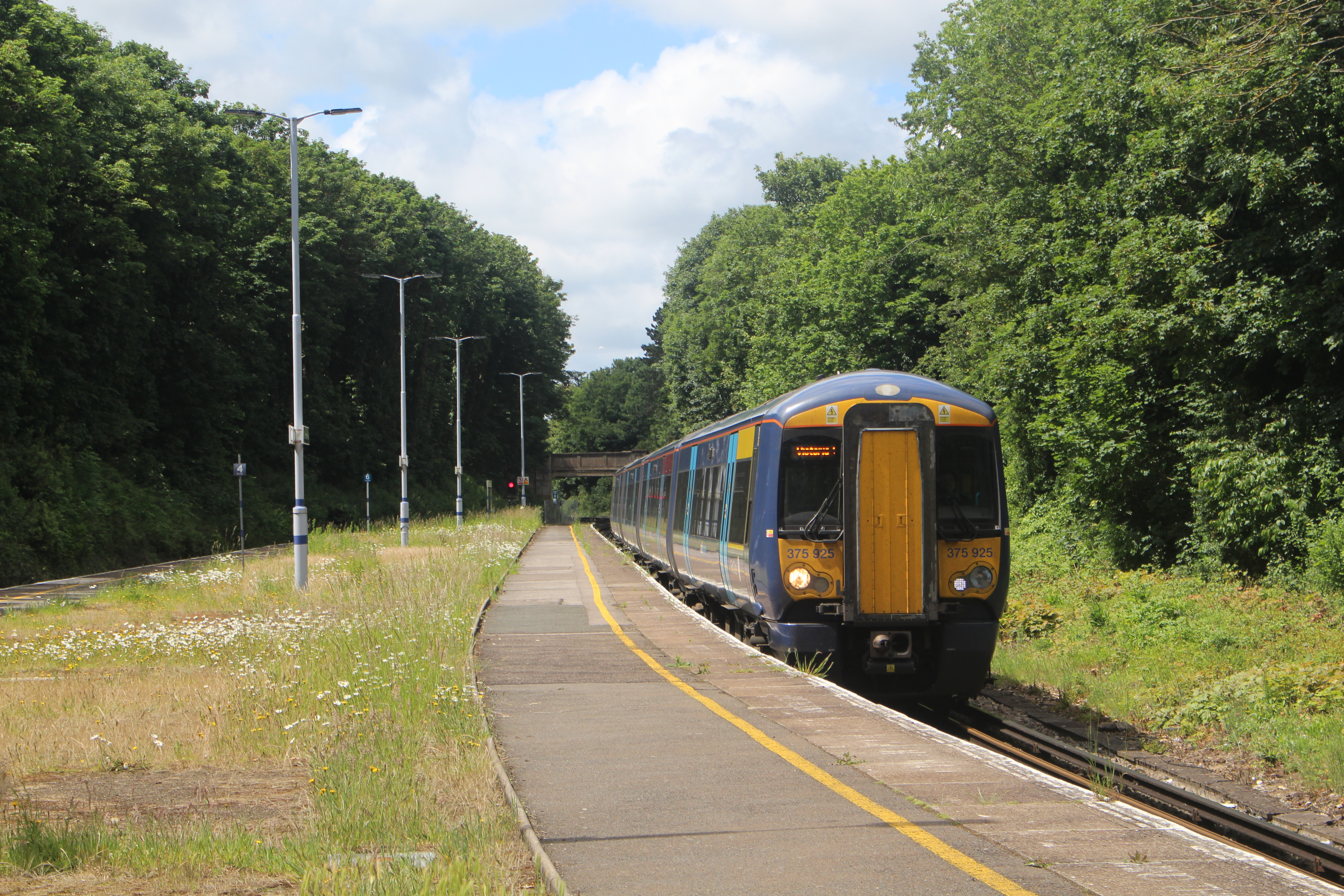

General information
- Location: Dumpton, District of Thanet; England
- Grid reference: TR386663
- Manager: Southeastern
- Platforms: 2

Other information
- Station code: DMP
- Classification: DfT category F2

History
- Opened: 19 July 1926

Passengers
- 2021/22: ▲23,252
- 2022/23: ▲23,618
- 2023/24: ▲31,974
- 2024/25: ▲45,098
- 2025/26: ▲53,090
Location
Notes
- Passenger statistics from the Office of Rail and Road

Dumpton Park railway station is on the Chatham Main Line in England, serving the district of Dumpton between the towns of Broadstairs and Ramsgate, Kent. It is 78 miles 26 chains (126.1 km) down the line from London Victoria and is situated between Broadstairs and Ramsgate stations.

The station and all trains that serve the station are operated by Southeastern.

The station has no buildings and just a few parking spaces, a bridge from the south side of the line to an island platform, with a small shelter at the bottom of the steps. Until 1965 the station served as the interchange between the main line and the nearby Tunnel Railway.

== History ==
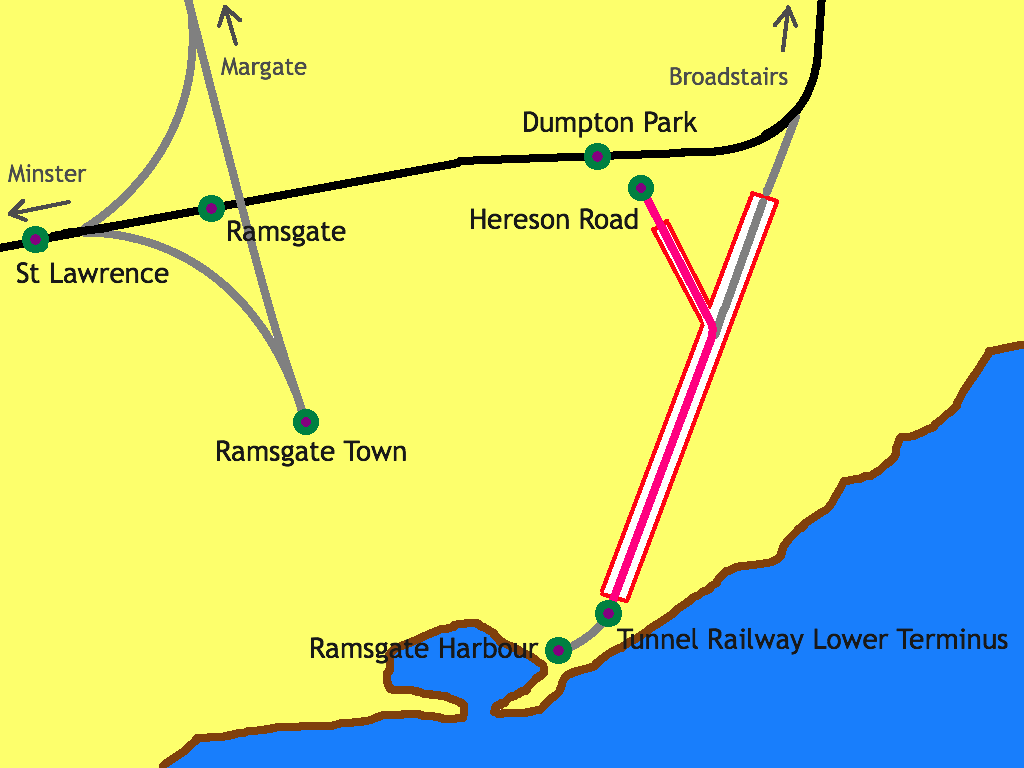
Layout of pre- and post-1926 lines and stations in Ramsgate

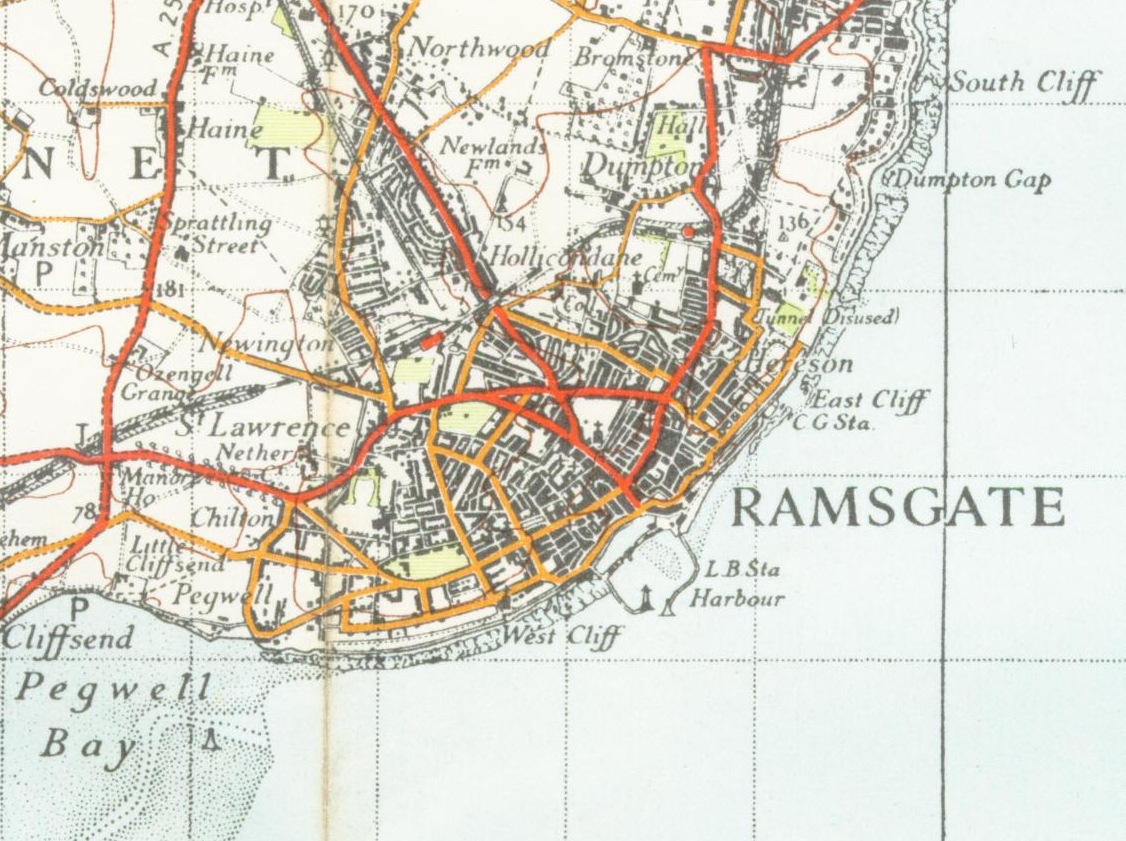
A 1945 Ordnance Survey of Ramsgate showing the location of the Dumpton Park and Ramsgate stations

Following the railway grouping of 1923, both the South Eastern Railway and the London, Chatham & Dover Railway became a part of the newly-formed Southern Railway, which looked at the duplication of lines and stations at Ramsgate and Margate. The company decided to link the two lines at Ramsgate to allow through running between them. That scheme had been proposed by the South Eastern & Chatham Railway before World War I, but work did not commence until 1925. That resulted in the closure of the two terminus stations at Ramsgate Town and Ramsgate Harbour, and the construction of a line skirting the northern edge of the town to link the two existing lines. New stations on the north-eastern and north-western fringes of the town, at Dumpton Park and Ramsgate respectively, replaced the stations in the town centre and at the harbour. Construction work on the new line involved over 700 men moving 200,000 long tons (220,000 short tons; 200,000 t) of chalk, at a cost of approximately £500,000 (£26 million in 2025).

The new link opened on 2 July 1926, although Dumpton Park station was not fully open to the public until 19 July 1926. On 2 July 1926, both former Ramsgate stations were closed along with the line through the tunnel to Ramsgate Harbour. The tunnel was sealed and abandoned, and the former Ramsgate Harbour station was sold to Thanet Amusements, which converted the site into a zoo and funfair called Merrie England. Although adequate for the town's residents, the new stations were a long way from the seafront attractions, which were at the foot of a steep hill. The day-trippers, on whom Ramsgate's tourist industry depended, were therefore increasingly attracted to Margate, where the station was next to the beach.

By 1933, Merrie England, then owned by Ramsgate Olympia, had become extremely popular, and began to lobby the Southern Railway to reopen the line through the tunnel, with a new junction station between Dumpton Park and Broadstairs. The Southern Railway rejected the proposal as too costly and impractical. Ramsgate Olympia and the Southern Railway were keen to make the attractions near the harbour accessible from the railway main line, and to provide a service from the seafront to the Dumpton Park stadium for Greyhound racing. The two companies eventually agreed on a scheme under which a new narrow-gauge line, dubbed the Tunnel Railway, would use the 780 yards (710 m) of the tunnel nearest the beach, before branching off into a new 364-yard (333 m) tunnel, which would emerge at a new station at Hereson Road, a 250-yard (230 m) walk from Dumpton Park station. To increase passenger numbers and encourage people to use the new rail line, Ramsgate Olympia planned the construction of a large-scale housing estate, charabanc parking facilities, and a 10,000-seat stadium at Dumpton Park. The railway closed in 1965.

When Dumpton Park Station was first built there was a booking hall at street level, a smaller version of the one currently at Broadstairs station, and the bridge and steps were covered by overhead glass plus a lift to platform level. Glass covering continuing down the steps to The ticket office window and station building, which included waiting room, small office and the toilet block was a separate building just down but adjoined by an overhead glass covering with benches underneath.the platform The building has since been demolished and the covering removed, in the early to mid 1980s. Years ago there was a signal box at the end of the platform (northbound end).

== Services ==
All services at Dumpton Park are operated by Southeastern using Class 375 EMUs.

The typical off-peak service in trains per hour is:

- 1 tph to London Victoria via Chatham
- 1 tph to Ramsgate

Additional services including trains to and from London Bridge and London Cannon Street call at the station in the peak hours.

Preceding station	National Rail	Following station
Broadstairs	Southeastern Chatham Main Line - Ramsgate Branch	Ramsgate

== Notes and references ==
=== Bibliography ===
- Harding, Peter A. (2005). The Ramsgate Tunnel Railway. Woking: Peter A. Harding. ISBN 0-9523458-9-7.
- Mitchell, Vic; Smith, Keith (1991). Sittingbourne to Ramsgate. Midhurst: Middleton Press. ISBN 0-906520-90-8.
