= Swalecliffe =

Coastal village in Kent, England

Coordinates: 51.363°N 1.07°E

- View facing West on St. Johns Road in Swalecliffe

- Location within Kent
- OS grid reference: TR136671
- District: Canterbury
- Shire county: Kent
- Region: South East
- Country: England
- Sovereign state: United Kingdom
- Post town: WHITSTABLE
- Postcode district: CT5 2
- Dialling code: 01227
- Police: Kent
- Fire: Kent
- Ambulance: South East Coast
- UK Parliament: Canterbury

Swalecliffe is a part of the ribbon development of the north Kent coast between Whitstable and Herne Bay in Southeast England. It forms Swalecliffe ward of City of Canterbury Council.

== History ==
The Doomsday book provides an early record of Swalecliffe:

Vitalis holds Swalecliffe of the bishop [Odo of Bayeux]. It is assessed at half a sulung. There is land for 1 1/2 ploughs. In demesne there is 1 plough, with 8 cottars who pay 4s 6d. Woodland for 20 pigs. TRE (Note: Tempore Regis Edwardi, in the time of King Edward (before the Norman Conquest).) it was worth 21s; when Vitalis received it 12s; now 30s. Edward Snoch held it of King Edward.

There is no mention of a church, but when the old church was demolished in 1875 there were traces of an earlier building. This may have been an early phase of the Norman church, but Whitley says that "it seems highly probable that the original church was a Saxon Foundation". Sketches of the old church appear to show Norman windows along with later features.

Throughout the later Middle Ages there are records of gifts to the church for a variety of purposes. There is little other information about the village. The church records do however record periods of frost, floods and gales to which a sea-facing, low-lying land would be subject. In the winters of 1812 and 1813 the sea froze in the Thames Estuary.

Swalecliffe's only mention in Hasted's monumental history of Kent records the gift in 1581 of a farm called "Bodkin's" (worth £11 6s 8d) to Gonvyle and Caius college in Cambridge University. Most of the money (£10 13s 4d) was used to fund four scholars.

In 1861, the parish was 1,297 acres (525 ha) in extent with a population of 168. The description in the National Gazetteer of 1868 reads:

Swalecliffe, a parish in the hundred of Bleangate, lathe of St. Augustine, county Kent, 7 miles N. of Canterbury, its post town, and 2 E. of Whitstable. The village is a coastguard station, situated on the Thames at the East Swale's mouth. The village is interesting as having been once the residence of William of Wykeham, whose mantelpiece is preserved in the old parsonage house. The living is a rectory in the diocese of Canterbury, value £292. The church, dedicated to St. John the Baptist, contains monuments to the families of Loggin, Duncombe, and Wykeham. There is an endowed school for ten free scholars.

In 1931, the civil parish had a population of 427. On 1 April 1934 the parish was abolished to form Whitstable. It is now in the unparished area of Whitstable.

== Transport ==
The Ramsgate branch of the Chatham Main Line runs south of Swalecliffe which is served by Chestfield & Swalecliffe railway station.

The A2990 Thanet Way runs between Swalecliffe and the neighbouring settlement of Chestfield and provides access to the main transport network.

There used to be an aerodrome at Swalecliffe, but its location is unknown. According to the Airfields of Britain Conservation Trust it functioned from prior to August 1946 up to c. 1950, however there is a picture taken on 28 June 1934 which purports to be at Swalecliffe Aerodrome. There is a report of a "Flying Circus" visiting the aerodrome in 1935.

== Recreational facilities ==
The ponds, stream and sea are all centres for birdwatching. In 2016 158 species of birds were recorded by members of Kent Ornithological Society.

To the north of the village the links provide a recreational resource and include a skateboard park. Part of the Saxon Shore Way footpath runs along the coast here.

== Healthcare provision ==
Swalecliffe Community Day Service provides support for people with learning disabilities both at Swalecliffe Day Centre and by organising outings to other facilities in the area.

== Gallery ==
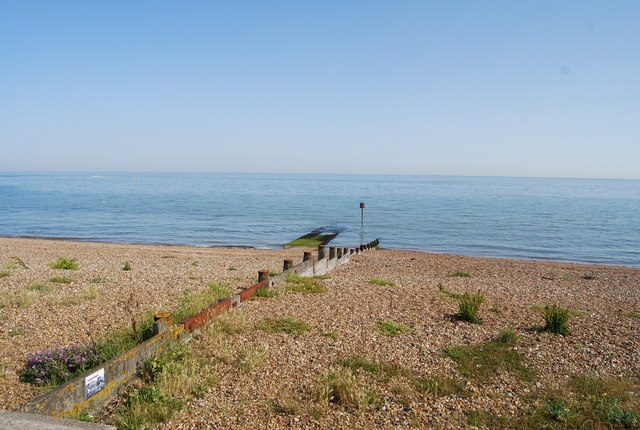
An old groyne

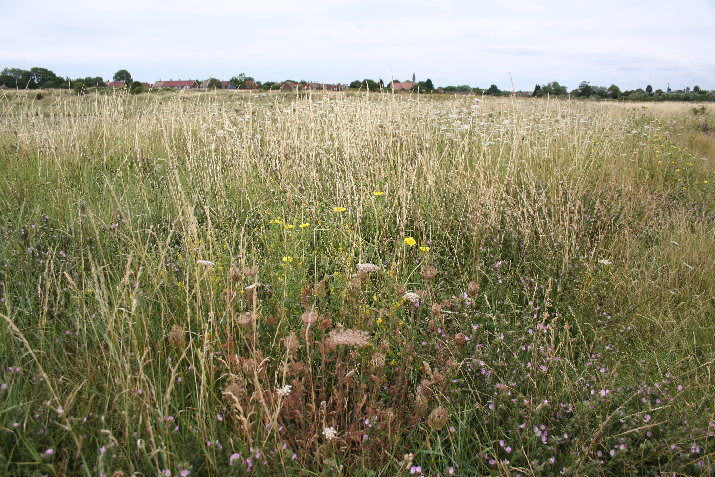
Swalecliffe mudflats

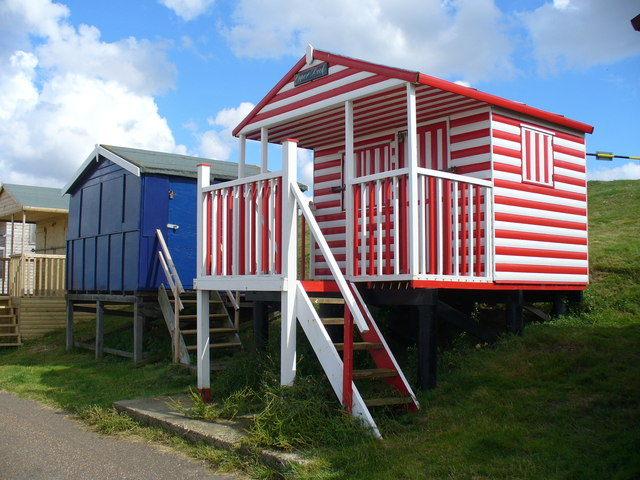
Bright colours on the beach huts at Tankerton Bay catch the eye

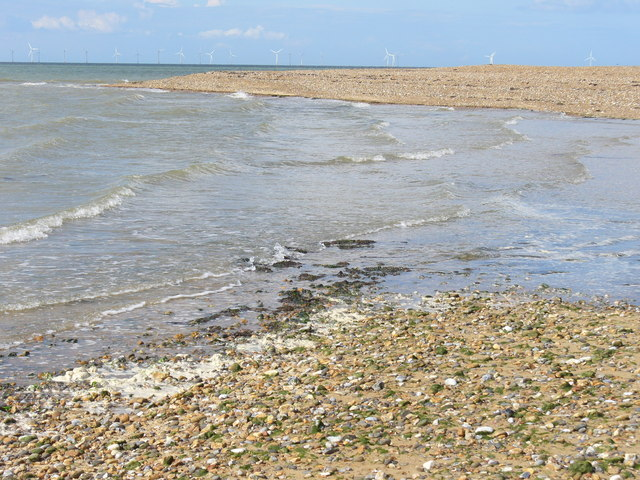
Long Rock, the estuary of the Burnham, a chalk stream whose source is on the Blean ridge near Dunkirk. On the skyline are some of the wind turbines in the Thames Estuary

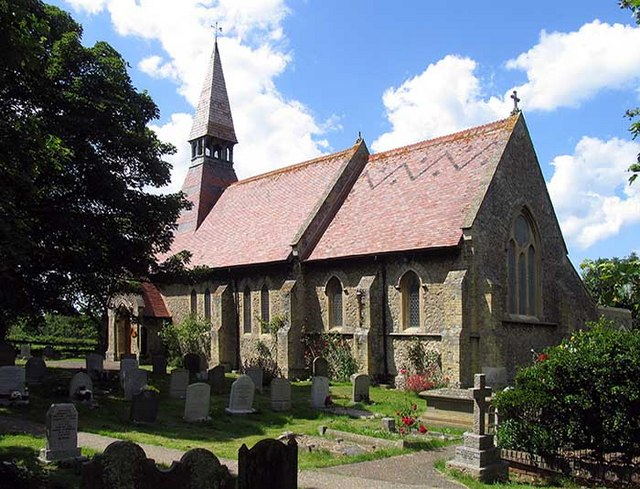
St John the Baptist church

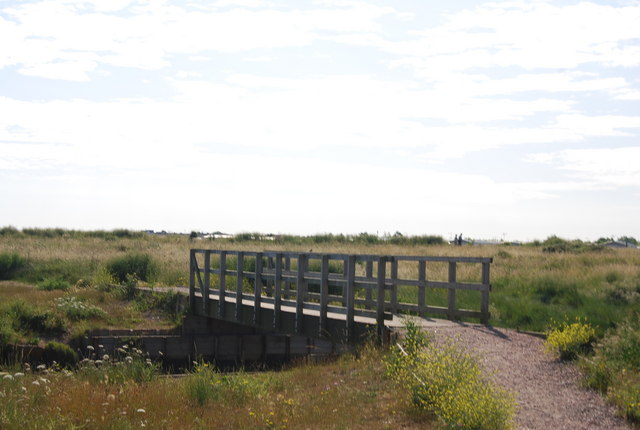
Bridge on the Saxon Shore Way

== Bibliography ==
- Airfields of Britain Conservation Trust (2018), Swalecliffe
- Chestfield in Kent History Site, Swalecliffe Transport
- Hamilton, NESA (Nicholas Esterhazy Stephen Armytage), ed. (1868), The National gazetteer of Great Britain and Ireland, London
- Hasted, Edward (1800), The History and Topographical Survey of the County of Kent, vol. 10, Canterbury
- Kent County Council (2017), Swalecliffe Community Day Service (PDF) (leaflet)
- Kent Ornithological Society (2018), Swalecliffe, November 2016
- Skatepark Hunter (2015), "Swalecliffe Skatepark", Skatepark Hunter
- Whitley, Michael (2005) [1991], The Church on the Seashore (revised ed.), Swalecliffe: St John's Church (no ISBN)
- Williams, Dr Ann; Martin, Professor G H, eds. (2003) [1992], Doomsday Book, a complete translation (paperback ed.), Penguin, ISBN 0-141-43994-7
