= Westgate-on-Sea railway station =

Railway station in Kent, England

Coordinates: 51.381°N 1.338°E

Westgate-on-Sea
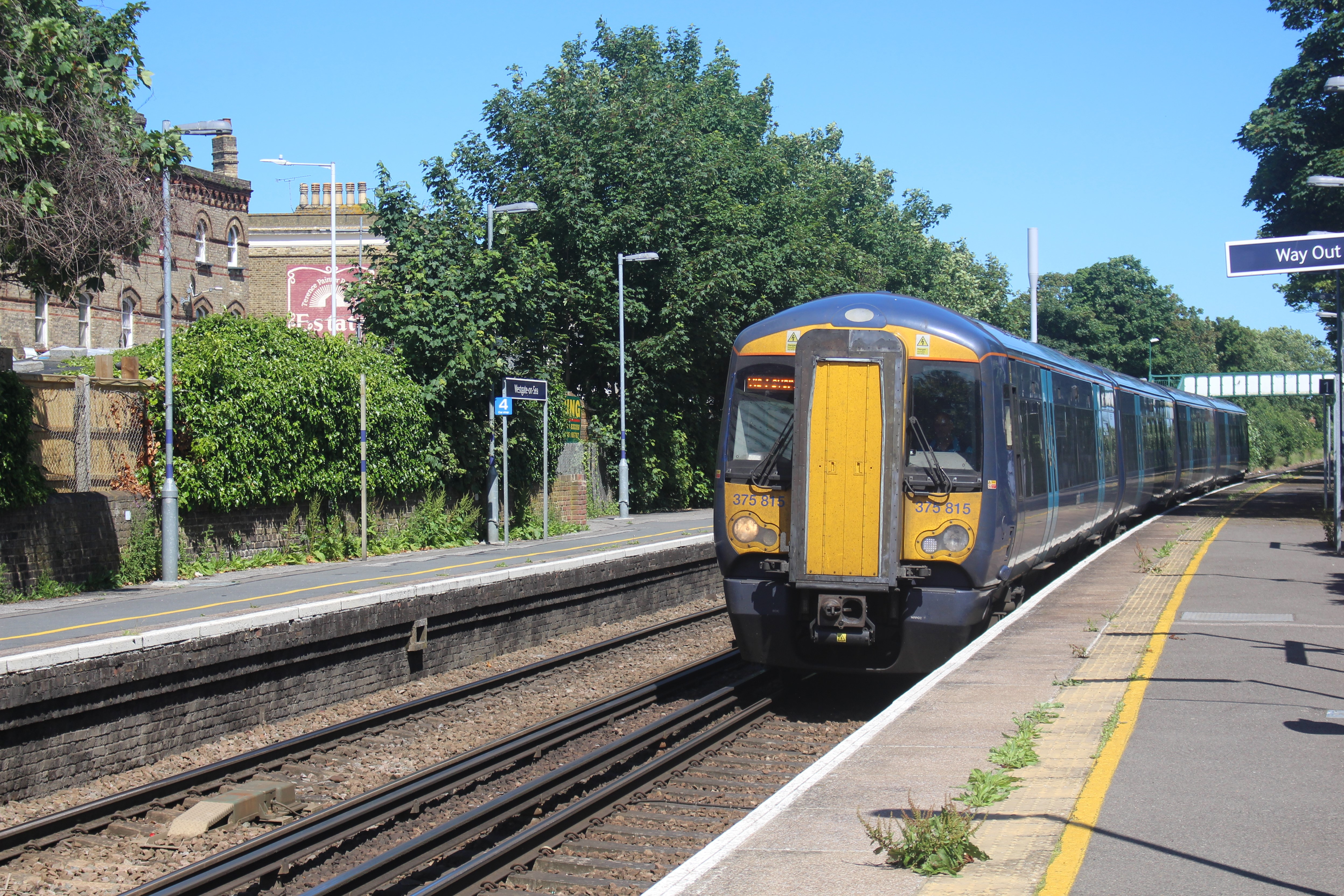

General information
- Location: Westgate-on-Sea, District of Thanet; England
- Grid reference: TR323699
- Managed by: Southeastern
- Platforms: 2

Other information
- Station code: WGA
- Classification: DfT category E

History
- Opened: April 1871

Passengers
- 2020/21: ▼39,708
- 2021/22: ▲0.105 million
- 2022/23: ▲0.130 million
- 2023/24: ▲0.169 million
- 2024/25: ▲0.199 million
Location
Notes
- Passenger statistics from the Office of Rail and Road

Westgate-on-Sea railway station is on the Chatham Main Line in England, serving the town of Westgate-on-Sea, Kent. It is 72 miles 35 chains (116.6 km) down the line from London Victoria and is situated between Birchington-on-Sea and Margate.

The station and all trains that serve the station are operated by Southeastern.

== Services ==
All services at Westgate-on-Sea are operated by Southeastern using Class 375 and 395 EMUs.

The typical off-peak service in trains per hour is:

- 1 tph to London Victoria
- 1 tph to Ramsgate

Additional services, including trains to and from London Bridge and London Cannon Street call at the station in the peak hours. The station is also served by a small number of High Speed services to London St Pancras International.

Preceding station	National Rail	Following station
Birchington-on-Sea	Southeastern Chatham Main Line - Ramsgate Branch	Margate
