= Chestfield & Swalecliffe railway station =

Railway station in Kent, England

Coordinates: 51°21′36.81″N 1°4′0.70″E

Chestfield and Swalecliffe
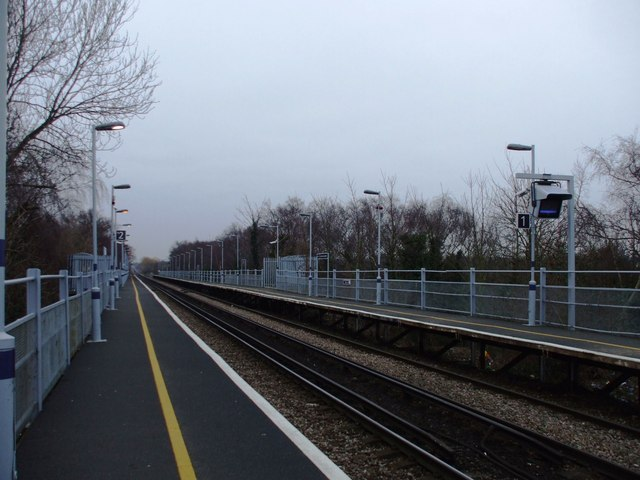

General information
- Location: Swalecliffe, City of Canterbury; England
- Grid reference: TR136668
- Managed by: Southeastern
- Platforms: 2

Other information
- Station code: CSW
- Classification: DfT category E

History
- Opened: 6 July 1930

Passengers
- 2020/21: ▼29,322
- 2021/22: ▲71,064
- 2022/23: ▲80,432
- 2023/24: ▲93,938
- 2024/25: ▲0.108 million
Location
Notes
- Passenger statistics from the Office of Rail and Road

Chestfield and Swalecliffe railway station is on the Ramsgate branch of the Chatham Main Line in England, serving the villages of Chestfield, Swalecliffe and the Eastern region of the town of Whitstable, Kent. It is 60 miles 45 chains (97.5 km) down the line from London Victoria and is situated between Whitstable and Herne Bay.

The station and all trains that serve the station are operated by Southeastern.

It was originally opened as Swalecliffe Halt on 6 July 1930 by Southern Railway. It was later renamed Chestfield & Swalecliffe Halt, shortened to Chestfield in 1987, and reverted to Chestfield and Swalecliffe in 1989. Although the station is located in the village of Swalecliffe, it also serves the nearby Chestfield, which is a substantially bigger village.

The platforms are built of rails and sleepers. There are waiting shelters on both platforms. The "down" ticket office was burnt down by vandals in 1989 and the closed "up" ticket office is still in situ. There is one ticket vending machine.

== Services ==
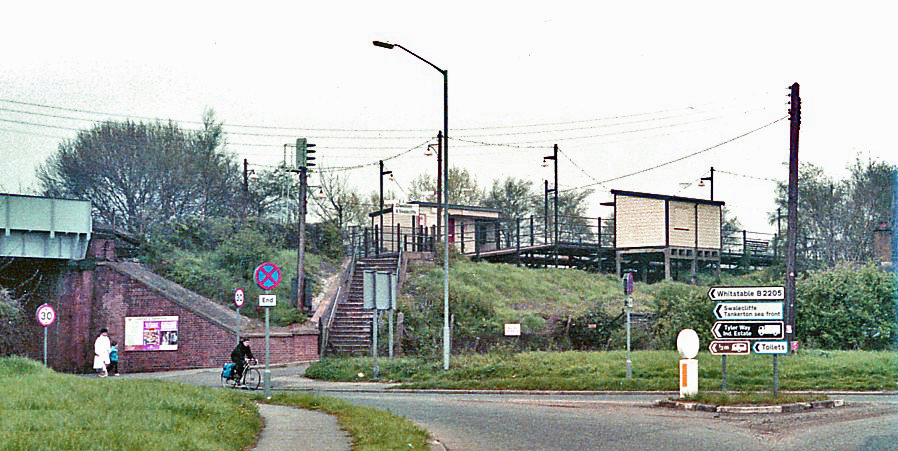
View from the road in 1985 before the by-pass was built.

All services at Chestfield & Swalecliffe are operated by Southeastern using Class 375 and 395 EMUs.

The typical off-peak service in trains per hour is:

- 1 tph to London Victoria
- 1 tph to Ramsgate

Additional services including trains to and from London Bridge and London Cannon Street call at the station in the peak hours. The station is also served by a small number of High Speed services to London St Pancras International.

Preceding station	National Rail	Following station
Whitstable	Southeastern Chatham Main Line - Ramsgate Branch	Herne Bay
