= Birchington-on-Sea railway station =

Railway station in Kent, England

Birchington-on-Sea
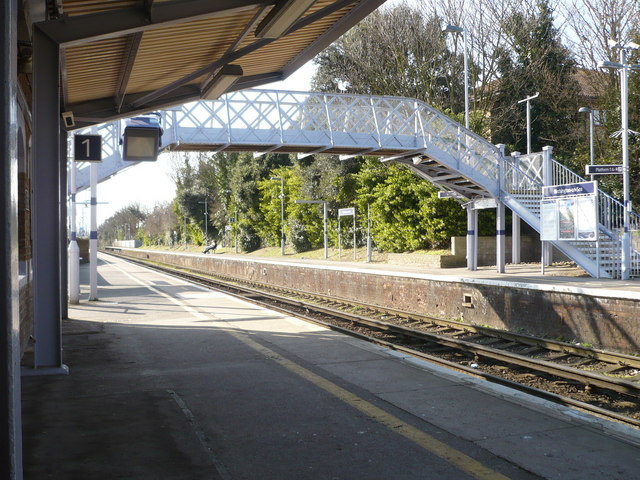

General information
- Location: Birchington-on-Sea, District of Thanet, England
- Coordinates: 51.377°N 1.301°E
- Grid reference: TR298694
- Manager: Southeastern
- Platforms: 2

Other information
- Station code: BCH
- Classification: DfT category E

History
- Original company: Kent Coast Railway
- Pre-grouping: South Eastern & Chatham Railway
- Post-grouping: Southern Railway

Key dates
- 5 October 1863: Opened as Birchington
- October 1878: Renamed Birchington-on-Sea

Passengers
- 2020/21: ▼0.122 million
- 2021/22: ▲0.283 million
- 2022/23: ▲0.308 million
- 2023/24: ▲0.341 million
- 2024/25: ▲0.350 million
Location
Notes
- Passenger statistics from the Office of Rail and Road

Birchington-on-Sea railway station serves the village of Birchington-on-Sea, in Kent, England. It lies on the Chatham Main Line, 70 miles 56 chains (113.8 km) down the line from London Victoria, situated between Herne Bay and Westgate-on-Sea. The station and all trains that serve the station are operated by Southeastern.

== History ==
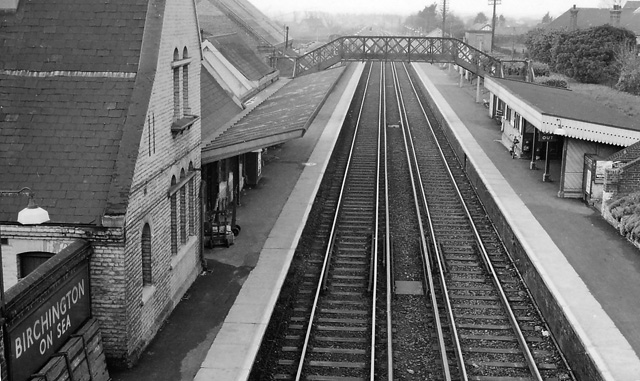
The station in 1963

The station was opened on 5 October 1863 by the Kent Coast Railway (KCR). The KCR was operated by the London, Chatham & Dover Railway (LCDR), which absorbed the KCR on 1 July 1871, and the station was renamed Birchington-on-Sea by the LCDR in October 1878.

From the start of 1899, the LCDR's services were operated by the newly formed South Eastern & Chatham Railway, which the LCDR co-owned with the South Eastern Railway (SER). At the start of 1923, the LCDR amalgamated with other railways (including the SER) to form the Southern Railway. Two Pullman camping coaches were positioned here by the Southern Region from 1963 to 1967.

A small goods yard was situated on the up London bound side of the station, which was closed in the 1970s; it was operated by the signal box located midway on the down platform closed about the same time during a resignalling programme. The wire and rod cutout can still be seen within the brick face of the down platform. Network Rail's 2007 budget plan allowed for the removal of the remaining manual turnround and it is believed short residual siding occasionally used for storing tamping track maintenance units.

A junction existed to the west of the station to serve RAF Manston until the 1930s operated from a Ground Frame Birchington B located some 440 yards (400 m) upside of the station. (Note: A plan of the junction can be seen in the RAF Manston museum.)

== Services ==
All services at Birchington-on-Sea are operated by Southeastern using Classes 375 and 395 electric multiple units.

The typical off-peak service in trains per hour (tph) is:

- 1 tph to London St Pancras International
- 1 tph to London Victoria
- 2 tph to Ramsgate.

Additional services call at peak hours, including trains to and from London Bridge and London Cannon Street.

Preceding station	National Rail	Following station
Herne Bay	Southeastern Chatham Main Line - Ramsgate Branch	Westgate-on-Sea
Herne Bay	Southeastern High Speed 1	Margate

== Onward connections ==
The station is located at one end of the high street and a short distance from the village square. Buses operate from the station to Minnis Bay and Margate on weekdays during peak hours; at other times, they can be caught from the village square.
