= Listed buildings in Chestfield =

Historic structures in Kent, England

Chestfield is a village and civil parish in the City of Canterbury district of Kent, England. It contains nine grade II listed buildings that are recorded in the National Heritage List for England.

This list is based on the information retrieved online from Historic England.

== Key ==
Grade	Criteria
I	Buildings that are of exceptional interest
II*	Particularly important buildings of more than special interest
II	Buildings that are of special interest

== Listing ==
Name	Grade	Location	Type	Completed (Note: The date given is the date used by Historic England as significant for the initial building or that of an important part in the structure's description.)	Date designated	Grid ref. (Note: The grid reference is based on the British national grid reference system, sometimes known as OSGB36, used by the Ordnance Survey.) Geo-coordinates	Notes	Entry number (Note: The "List Entry Number" is a unique number assigned to each listed building and scheduled monument by Historic England.)	Image	Wikidata
Shepherd's Cottage	II	88, Chestfield Road			20 May 1977	TR1349565571; 51°20′57″N 1°03′52″E		1336875	Upload Photo	Q26621340
Chestfield Golf Club House	II	Chestfield Road			30 March 1951	TR1356865763; 51°21′03″N 1°03′56″E		1104934	Upload Photo	Q26398896
The Barn Tea Rooms	II	Chestfield Road	tea house		20 May 1977	TR1355065781; 51°21′03″N 1°03′55″E		1084971	The Barn Tea Rooms More images	Q26370087
Molehill Cottage	II	Molehill Road			20 May 1977	TR1365265519; 51°20′55″N 1°04′00″E		1084947	Upload Photo	Q26369959
Sparrer Court	II	Molehill Road			20 May 1977	TR1366065498; 51°20′54″N 1°04′00″E		1106330	Upload Photo	Q26400201
Gas Lantern and Column West of North and South Tythe Barn	II	The Drive			20 May 1977	TR1381965924; 51°21′08″N 1°04′10″E		1336880	Upload Photo	Q26621345
North and South Tythe Barn	II	The Drive			2 August 1976	TR1384565931; 51°21′08″N 1°04′11″E		1084934	Upload Photo	Q26369882
Paddock South the Paddock	II	The Drive			20 May 1977	TR1384265909; 51°21′07″N 1°04′11″E		1325991	Upload Photo	Q26611501
The Manor House the Old Farm House	II	The Drove			20 May 1977	TR1384565875; 51°21′06″N 1°04′11″E		1336879	Upload Photo	Q26621344

== See also ==
- Grade I listed buildings in Kent
- Grade II* listed buildings in Kent

== Sources ==
- Newman, John (2013) [1969], Kent: North-East and East, The Buildings of England, New Haven and London: Yale University Press, ISBN 978-0-300-18506-5
