= Margate Sands railway station =

Disused railway station in Margate, Kent

Margate Sands
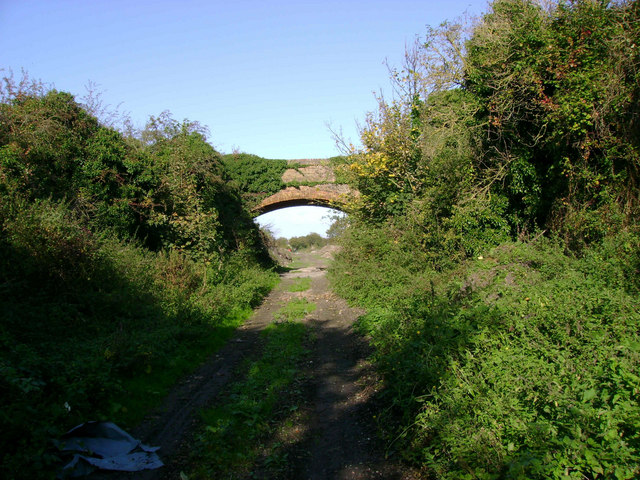
- The bridge over the old SER line to Margate Sands in 2008

General information
- Location: Margate, Kent; England
- Coordinates: 51.3738°N 1.3838°E
- Grid reference: TR356693
- Platforms: 2

Other information
- Status: Disused

History
- Original company: South Eastern Railway

Key dates
- 1 December 1846: Opened as Margate
- 1 June 1899: Name changed to Margate Sands
- 2 July 1926: Closed
Location

Margate Sands railway station served the town of Margate, Kent, England from 1846 to 1926 on the Kent Coast Line.

== History ==
The station and connection line was first proposed in 1841 by the South Eastern Railway (SER), and surveyed by Robert Stephenson.

The station opened on 1 December 1846. The line took a convoluted route to reach Margate, running via Ashford, Canterbury and Ramsgate, and requiring a reversal at the latter. To save costs, the line was single-track beyond Canterbury and the original station building was a simple wooden structure. Shortly after opening, a passing loop was added on the line to alleviate congestion. A permanent building opened in 1859, costing £3,900. A chord was built at Ramsgate in 1863, which meant that trains could travel direct to the station from Canterbury without having to reverse. A refreshment room opened in 1873. The station's name was changed to Margate Sands on 1 June 1899.

The station struggled with competition from rival railways, particularly the London, Chatham and Dover Railway (LCDR), which constructed a line around Thanet to Ramsgate Harbour in 1863. The station closed on 2 July 1926, as part of the Southern Railway's plan to connect up and amalgamate the separate railway lines around Thanet built by the SER and others. Goods services were withdrawn at the station on 20 December, but the branch line continued to be used to serve the goods depot south of the former London, Chatham & Dover line until 1976. The station buildings were demolished in the 1950s and the site was subsequently used as a car park, then as apartments and an amusement arcade.

== Incidents ==
In August 1864, a train pulling into the station collided with one already at the platform. A carriage was pulled up during the collision and ended up resting on the station roof. One woman was killed in the accident.

Preceding station	Historical railways	Following station
terminus	South Eastern Railway; Kent Coast Line	Tivoli; Line and station closed
