= Radfall =

Hamlet in Kent, England

Coordinates: 51°20′23″N 1°3′48″E

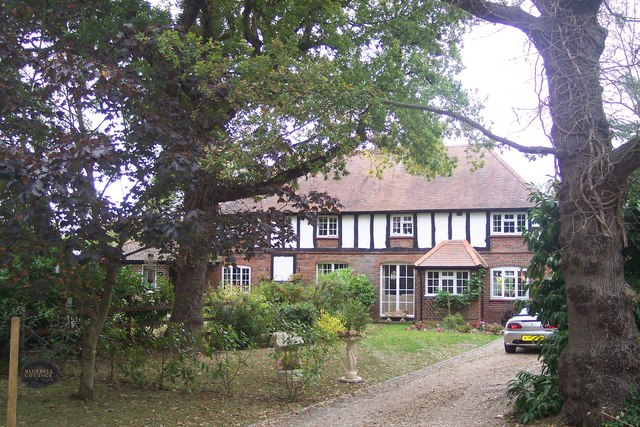
- Bluebell Cottage

- Location within Kent
- Civil parish: Chestfield
- District: Canterbury
- Shire county: Kent
- Region: South East
- Country: England
- Sovereign state: United Kingdom
- Police: Kent
- Fire: Kent
- Ambulance: South East Coast

Radfall is a hamlet between Chestfield (1.05 mi) and Canterbury (5.8 mi). Radfall lies between the Thanet Way and Thornden Wood, in the civil parish of Chestfield, in the Canterbury district of Kent, England.

== History ==
Early History

The Hamlet is likely named after an ancient droveway that cuts through Blean known as ‘The Radfall’. The name derives from the Old Kentish word ‘Rodfall’ and means ‘A rod’s clearance of woodland.’ Nearby findings of Belgic ceramics in pits have been used to date the track to the Late Bronze to Early Iron Age. During the early mediaeval period, wooden banks were placed on either side to keep animals from roaming off. The droveway was likely used to transport livestock from pastures in Blean to markets in Canterbury. Surfaced under gravel, parallel grooves known as cart ruts sit along the drove way, and were formed by the wheels of passing carts and wagons. Now demolished, there was once a farmstead near Radfall Cottage.

Late History

Radfall is first recorded in 1820 as ‘The Radfall.’ The Mockett family is present in the 1881 census as agricultural labourers. Gerorge Mockett of Radfall Cottages is recorded by newspapers as working at a farm until an accident in 1899. In 1916, St Augustine's Battalion marched through Radfall Corner. A complex of military trenches were built north of Radfall in the First World War. During the Second World War, slit trenches were constructed overlooking a roadblock. By the 1970s, Radfall had a local cricket club.

== Travel ==

Radfall has few local amenities, and is reliant on the nearby Chestfield (1.05 mi) along Chestfield Road and Canterbury (5.8 mi) along Hackington Road. The area suffers from road closures. Nearby Clowes Wood and Dogs Trust Canterbury Rehoming Centre are along Radfall Road. Radfall has 6 bus stops that are active from Monday to Friday. The main bus operator is Stagecoach South East and YMS Travel. Routes through Radfall are: 5, 914, 915, 916, 917. The earliest bus station is Broomfield Gate (Southbound) on 5 route at 07:09 AM.

== Water Supply ==
On May 2026, disrupted water supplies have affected the Hamlet. For around a week, 60 residents were without water due to a ‘technical issue with boosters’ During August, 64 residents experienced low water pressure or no supply at all.
