= Whitstable railway station =

Railway station in Kent, England

Coordinates: 51°21′27.36″N 1°2′0.55″E

Whitstable
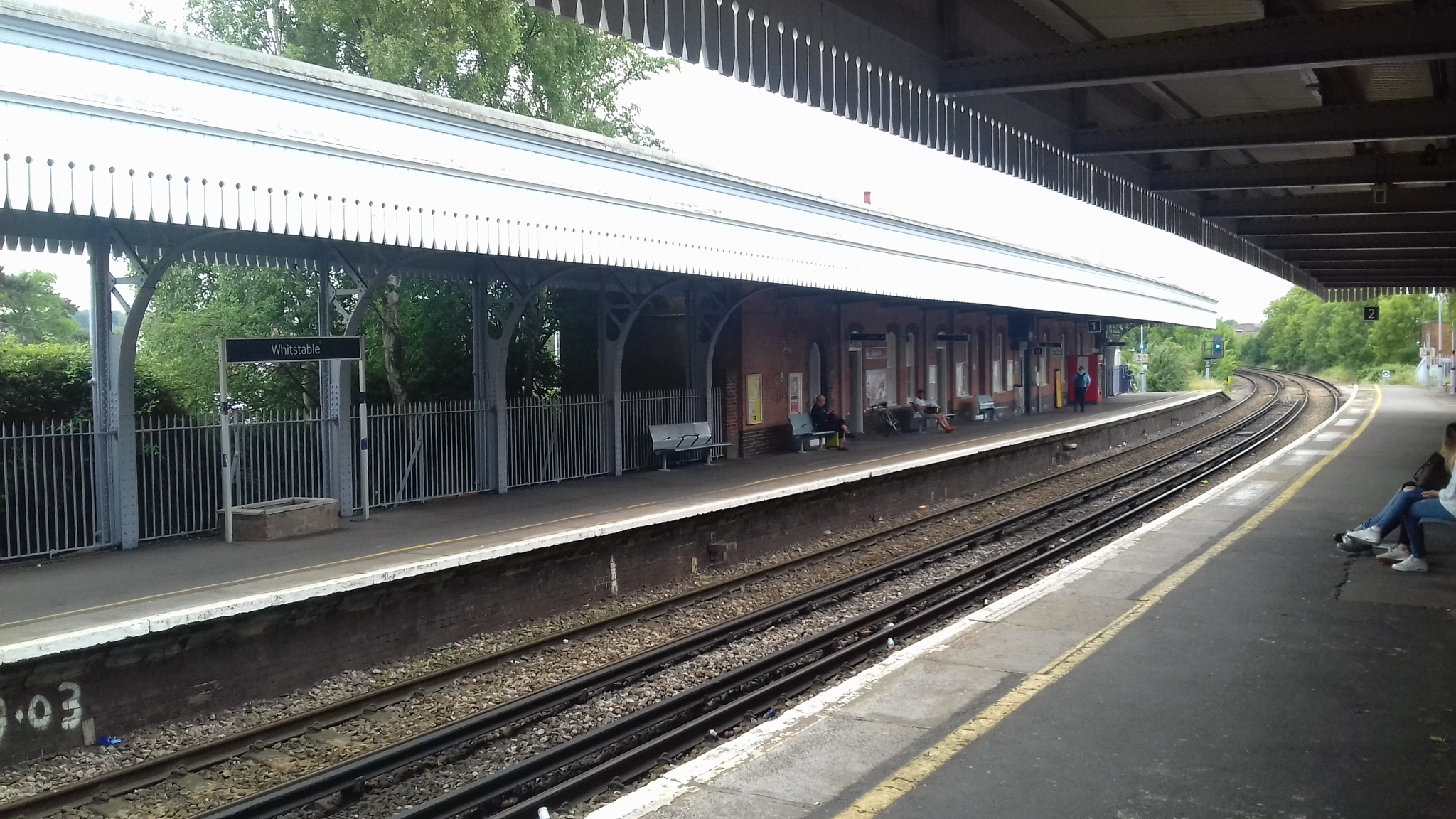

General information
- Location: Whitstable, City of Canterbury; England
- Grid reference: TR112664
- Managed by: Southeastern
- Platforms: 2

Other information
- Station code: WHI
- Classification: DfT category D

History
- Original company: London, Chatham and Dover Railway
- Pre-grouping: South Eastern and Chatham Railway
- Post-grouping: Southern Railway

Key dates
- 1 August 1860: first station opened
- 1 January 1915: Resited and present station opened as Whitstable Town and Tankerton
- 1 February 1936: Renamed Whitstable and Tankerton
- 1979: Renamed Whitstable

Passengers
- 2020/21: ▼0.251 million
- 2021/22: ▲0.635 million
- 2022/23: ▲0.721 million
- 2023/24: ▲0.768 million
- 2024/25: ▲0.877 million
Location
Notes
- Passenger statistics from the Office of Rail and Road

Whitstable railway station is on the Ramsgate branch of the Chatham Main Line in England, serving the town of Whitstable, Kent. It is 59 miles 6 chains (95.1 km) down the line from London Victoria and is situated between Faversham and Chestfield & Swalecliffe.

The station and all trains that call are operated by Southeastern.

== History ==
Whitstable has been served by five different stations on two different routes. The route between Faversham and Whitstable was opened by the Margate Railway on 1 August 1860, and was extended to Herne Bay on 13 July 1861. The first station on that line to serve Whitstable was in Oxford Street, and had latterly been known as Whitstable Town; it closed after the last train on 31 December 1914.

The following day, a new station was opened 705 yards (645 m) to the east; this was named Whitstable Town & Tankerton. This was renamed Whitstable & Tankerton on 1 February 1936, and Whitstable in 1979.

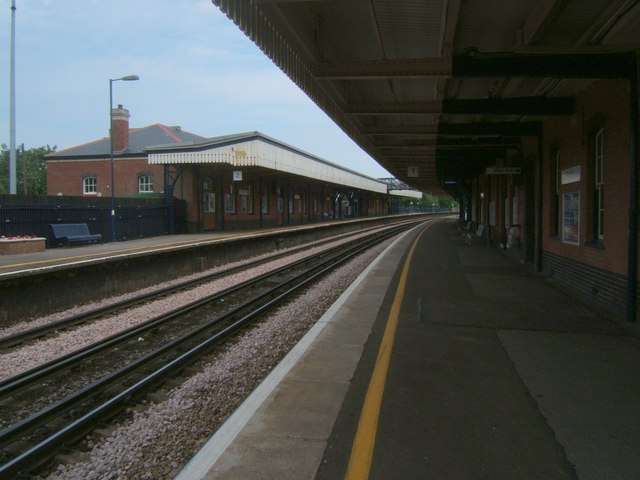
Whitstable station in 2006.

== Facilities ==
The station has a ticket office which is staffed throughout the day Monday-Saturday and during Sunday mornings and early afternoons. The station also has a self-service ticket machine for ticket purchases for when the ticket office is closed.

The station has passenger help points located on both platforms as well as toilets and a waiting room which are open when the station is staffed. There is a chargeable car park (operated by Saba Parking) as well as cycle racks located at the entrance to the station. There is also a taxi rank at the station.

The station has step-free access available to both platforms from the street although the platforms are linked via a stepped footbridge meaning step-free access is not possible between the platforms.

== Bus connections ==
The station is served by Stagecoach South East route 5 which provides connections to Whitstable town centre, Chestfield and Canterbury.

The Stagecoach route 400/401 services between Canterbury and Herne Bay can be caught from the town centre, which is a short walk from the railway station.

== Services ==
All services at Whitstable are operated by Southeastern using Class 375 and 395 EMUs.

The typical off-peak service in trains per hour is:

- 1 tph to London St Pancras International
- 1 tph to London Victoria
- 2 tph to Ramsgate

Additional services, including trains to and from London Bridge and London Cannon Street call at the station in the peak hours.

Preceding station	National Rail	Following station
Faversham	Southeastern Chatham Main Line - Ramsgate Branch	Chestfield & Swalecliffe
Faversham	Southeastern High Speed 1	Herne Bay

== See also ==
- Whitstable Harbour railway station
