= Ramsgate Town railway station =

Disused railway station in Kent, England

Coordinates: 51.3390°N 1.4135°E

Ramsgate Town
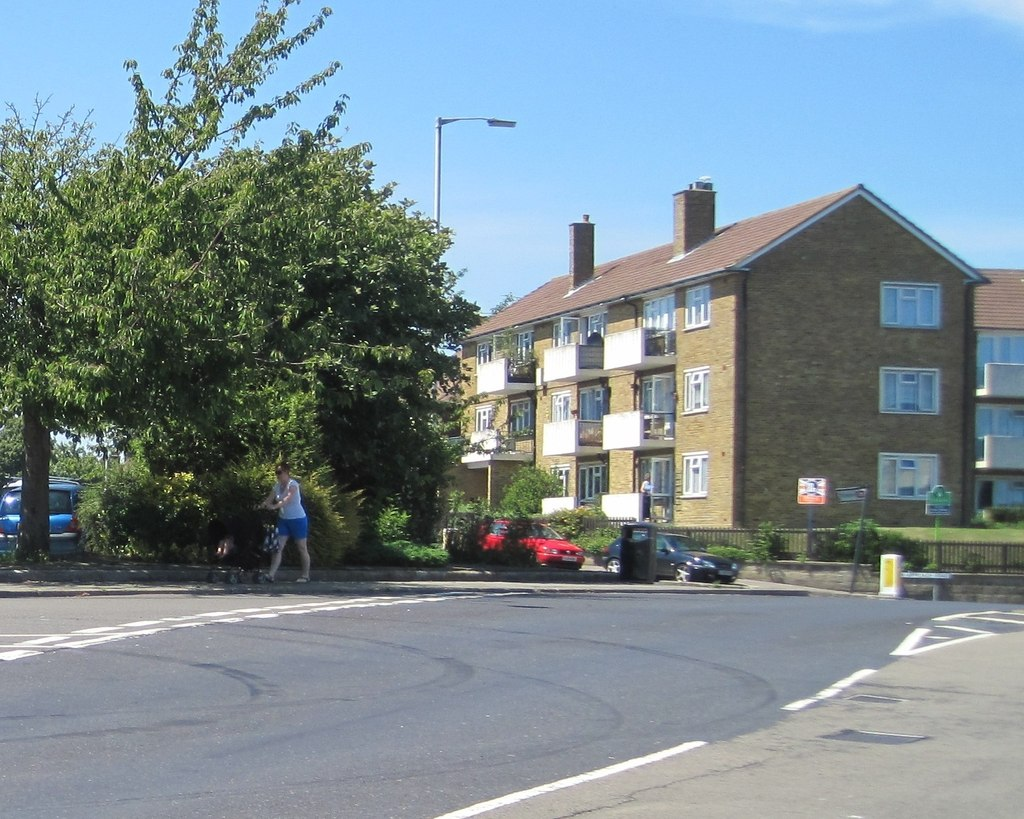
- The site of the station in 2012

General information
- Location: Ramsgate, District of Thanet; England
- Platforms: 4

Other information
- Status: Disused

History
- Original company: South Eastern Railway (UK)
- Pre-grouping: South Eastern and Chatham Railway
- Post-grouping: Southern Railway

Key dates
- 1 December 1846: Opened as Ramsgate
- 1 July 1899: Renamed Ramsgate Town
- 2 July 1926: Closed
Location

Ramsgate Town railway station is a former railway station in Ramsgate, in the Thanet district of Kent, England. It was the seaside resort's first station, but was closed in 1926 when a new, more direct railway line bypassed it and the town's other station, Ramsgate Harbour.

== History ==
Ramsgate developed as one of South East England's main seaside resorts in the 19th century. It became a natural target during the "Railway Mania" period of the 1840s, and the South Eastern Railway company was the first to reach it when it built a route which branched off from the South Eastern Main Line at Ashford. This reached Canterbury on 6 February 1846 and Ramsgate on 13 April of that year. Ramsgate station, as it was then called, was built as a terminus station: when a further extension was built to Margate Sands station on 1 December 1846, trains had to reverse at Ramsgate to continue their journey.

Ramsgate Harbour station opened on 5 October 1863; it was much closer to the seafront and the town centre than the Town station. Both stations bore the name Ramsgate until 1871; the Harbour station was then renamed Ramsgate & St Lawrence-on-Sea. On 1 July 1899, it became Ramsgate Harbour, and Ramsgate was renamed Ramsgate Town.

The Southern Railway company took over the South Eastern Railway's operations on 1 January 1923 as a result of the Grouping Act. On 2 July 1926, it opened a new line, 1.6 miles (2.6 km) long, to connect the previously separate routes to the Town and Harbour stations. The route bypassed both stations, and two new stations—Dumpton Park and Ramsgate—were built on it to serve the town. From that date, the section of line between the new junction and Ramsgate Town station, and the station itself, were closed. The station was demolished immediately after closure and the site of the station is now covered by housing development, erasing all trace of the railway. A stub end of the line remains as two carriage sidings adjacent to the south of the present station terminating at Wilfred Road. The route of the line to Ramsgate Town station lies about where Station Approach Road has now been built. The station stood on the west side of Margate Road, at what is now the junction with Station Approach Road.

== Accidents and incidents ==
- On 11 August 1858, a passenger train collided with the buffers. Twenty people were injured.
- On 11 March 1913, a passenger train, hauled by SECR H Class 0-4-4T No. 324, failed to stop at the station. It pushed a van through the buffer stops. Ten people were injured. The accident was caused by the failure to connect the brake pipe between the locomotive and its train.

Preceding station	Disused railways	Following station
St Lawrence (Pegwell Bay); Line partly open, station closed	South Eastern Railway; Ashford to Ramsgate line	Terminus
Tivoli; Line and station closed	South Eastern Railway; Margate Sands branch	Terminus
