= Herne Bay railway station =

Railway station in Kent, England

Coordinates: 51°21′52.18″N 1°7′4.14″E

Herne Bay
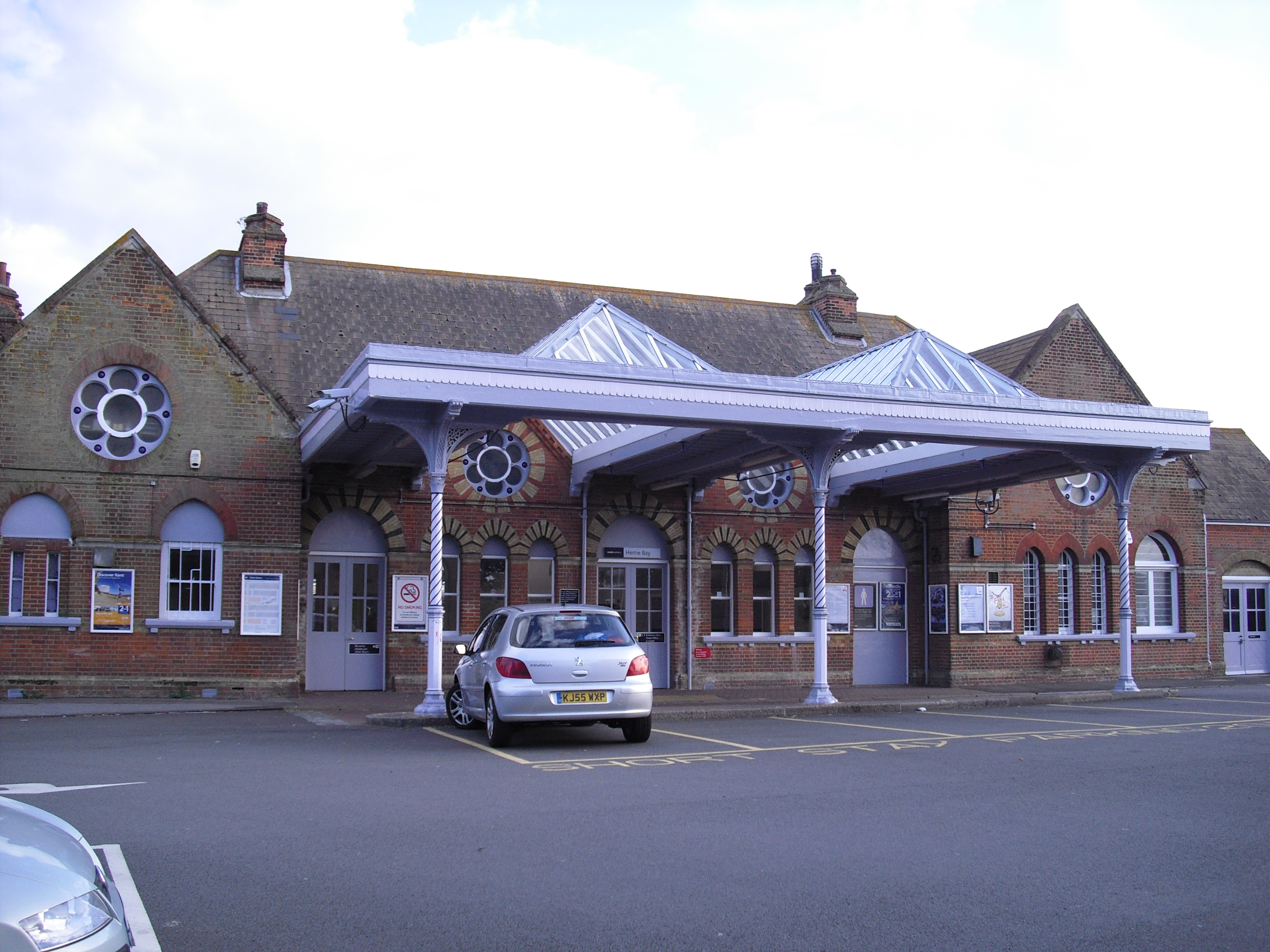

General information
- Location: Herne Bay, City of Canterbury; England
- Grid reference: TR171674
- Managed by: Southeastern
- Platforms: 2

Other information
- Station code: HNB
- Classification: DfT category D

History
- Opened: 5 October 1863

Passengers
- 2020/21: ▼0.279 million
- 2021/22: ▲0.635 million
- 2022/23: ▲0.702 million
- 2023/24: ▲0.748 million
- 2024/25: ▲0.835 million
Location
Notes
- Passenger statistics from the Office of Rail and Road

Herne Bay railway station is on the Chatham Main Line in England, serving the town of Herne Bay, Kent. It is 62 miles 58 chains (100.9 km) down the line from London Victoria and is situated between Chestfield & Swalecliffe and Birchington-on-Sea.

The station and all trains that serve the station are operated by Southeastern.

== History ==
Constructed by the Herne Bay and Faversham Railway Company, the first station originally opened in 1861 as "Herne Bay and Hampton-on-Sea" as the terminus of a line from Faversham; however, this station was a temporary one, located just west of where Greenhill Bridge is now situated. The line was extended to Ramsgate on 5 October 1863, when the current station was brought into use. The line was worked by the London, Chatham & Dover Railway which acquired the Herne Bay Company in 1871. On the station platform in 1879–1880, a Hampton-on-Sea sign was added to the Herne Bay one in the expectation of the development of a new settlement next to what is now Hampton, but Hampton-on-Sea was drowned due to coastal erosion by 1921. It is not recorded how long the sign survived.

(See historic photo, right): The buildings on the Down platform are all that remain of the original station building, as the Up side was reconstructed by the Southern Railway in 1926 as part of its plan to modernise the Thanet Lines. Goods facilities at the station were limited, consisting of two sidings on the Down side, a goods shed and two loading docks. In 1902 coal sidings were added to the Up side, followed by a private siding to the local gasworks. Electrification took place on 15 June 1959 and the old semaphore signals were replaced by colour-lights under Southern Region. General goods traffic ceased on 16 October 1965, with coal deliveries continuing until 1968.

Herne Bay Railway Station was also featured briefly in the British Sitcom Some Mothers Do 'Ave 'Em, in the episode "Have a break, take a Husband" which originally aired 8 March 1973.

In October 2021, approval was given to construct a footbridge with lifts that will enable step-free access to both platforms. The new footbridge opened in April 2025.

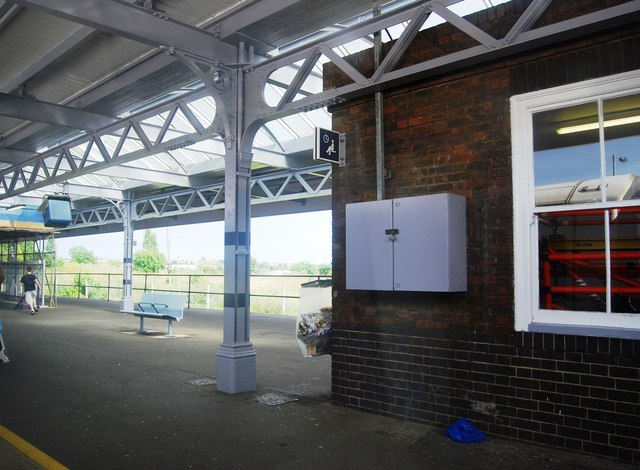
Herne Bay as viewed from a train

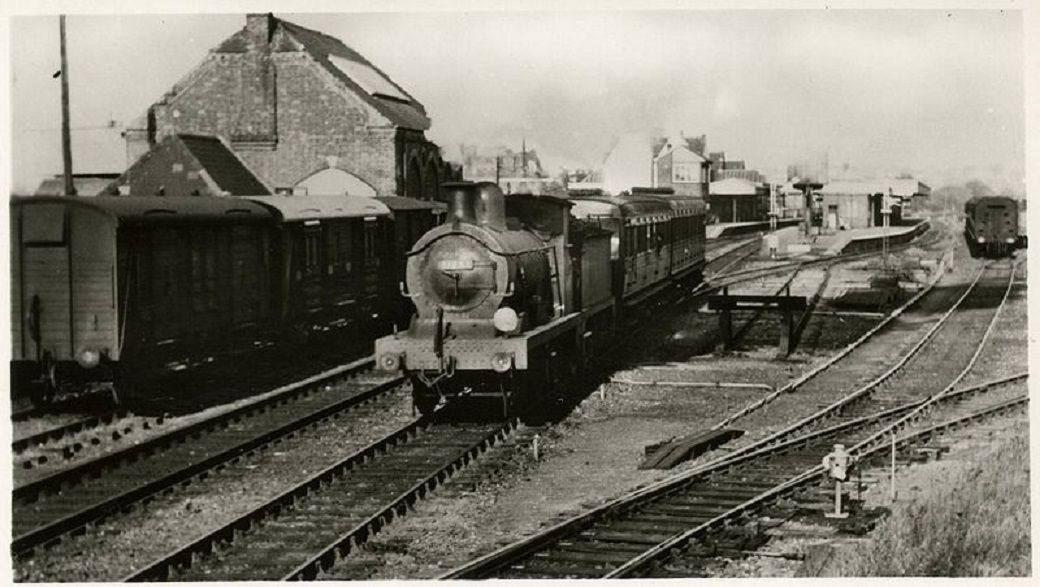
KCF 31461 northbound from Herne Bay station, 2 May 1953

== Accidents and incidents ==
- On 1 August 1895, a freight train collided with a passenger train at the station. One person was killed.

== Services ==
All services at Herne Bay are operated by Southeastern using Class 375 and 395 EMUs.

The typical off-peak service in trains per hour is:

- 1 tph to London St Pancras International
- 1 tph to London Victoria
- 2 tph to Ramsgate

Additional services, including trains to and from London Bridge and London Cannon Street call at the station in the weekday peak hours.

Preceding station	National Rail	Following station
Chestfield & Swalecliffe	Southeastern Chatham Main Line - Ramsgate Branch	Birchington-on-Sea
Whitstable	Southeastern High Speed 1	Birchington-on-Sea
