= Tivoli railway station =

Disused railway station in Kent, England

General information
- Location: Margate, Thanet, Kent; England
- Coordinates: 51°22′44″N 1°22′49″E
- Grid reference: TR35316983
- Platforms: 1

Other information
- Status: Disused

History
- Original company: South Eastern Railway

Key dates
- 20 July 1848: Opened
- c. 1867: Closed
Location

Tivoli railway station was a non-public timetable railway station (Note: Non-public timetable stations were stations that did not feature in the publicly advertised railway timetable and were, for example, for internal railway use only or only served by excursion trains rather than regular services.) operated by the South Eastern Railway (SER) between 1848 and c. 1867.

== History ==
The Tivoli Gardens in Margate opened in 1829. In December 1846 the SER opened its line from Ramsgate to a terminus at Margate Sands. The Tivoli Gardens lay alongside the railway line, approximately 940 yards (860 metres) south of Margate Sands station and the manager of the gardens, a Mr Divers, negotiated with the SER to open a station to serve the gardens. The station, a single platform with steps down to the gardens opened on 20 July 1848 and was located on the opposite side of Tivoli Road from the gardens. The station was not served by scheduled passenger trains but only by excursions to the gardens and race meetings at Margate Racecourse, situated nearby at Shottendane.

The gardens closed in 1867 and the last recorded race meeting was in 1871. Closure of the station was probably concurrent with these closures although the actual date of the station is unknown. The Railway Magazine for June 1906 stated that it had been over 30 years since the station closed.

The embankment of the former line to Tivoli station is still visible either side of the B2052, to the north of Tivoli Park Avenue.
