= Chestfield =

Village in Kent, England

Coordinates: 51.355°N 1.064°E

- Aerial of Chestfield in 2015

- Location within Kent
- Interactive map showing the parish boundary
- Area: 7.94 km^{2} (3.07 sq mi)
- Population: 3,132 (2021 census)
  - Density: 394/km^{2} (1,020/sq mi)
- OS grid reference: TR132657
- Civil parish: Chestfield
- District: City of Canterbury
- Shire county: Kent
- Region: South East
- Country: England
- Sovereign state: United Kingdom
- Post town: Whitstable
- Postcode district: CT5
- Dialling code: 01227
- Police: Kent
- Fire: Kent
- Ambulance: South East Coast
- UK Parliament: Canterbury

Chestfield is a suburb and civil parish in the City of Canterbury district of Kent, England. It is 1 mile (1.6 km) south-east of Whitstable, 2 miles (3.2 km) south-west of Herne Bay, and approximately 5 miles (8 km) north of Canterbury.

The north-east of the parish is non-residential, having a Sainsbury's and B&Q store, warehouses and office spaces.

== History ==
There is evidence for human activity in Chestfield since at least the late Bronze Age or earlier. An axehead from the Neolithic period was found on Ridgeway in Chestfield. Archeological evaluations in 2000 found six pottery sherds dated from The Late Bronze to Early Iron Age and a single sherd from the Prehistoric Period on Chestfield Road. Along Radfall corner, a metal trackway showed visible ruts along its path.

Molehill Road, Chestfield

In 1998, an excavation was done by Pre-Construct Archaeology Ltd before new housing development. In their discovery, post-holes and a semi circler ring ditch was found in Molehill road, Chestfield. On the site was evidence of salt extraction, such as fragments briquetage, course ceramic pillars used for salt extraction in the Bronze Age. From collected flints and the plough soil, the earliest of the site dates to is the late Bronze Age.

Signs of pottery production in Molehill Road was uncovered and dated to the Roman occupation of Britain. Two kilns were excavated and burnt clay and daub was hypothesised as kiln furniture. Burnt materials identified were emmer and spelt, barley and oats. Archaeological excavations in 1999, oval Early Middle Age huts were uncovered on Churchwood Drive. The findings of the site ranged from the dates 850 to 1300. A burial of a pig was uncovered, believed to have been a high-valued sow. Ditches and gullies indicate farming agriculture to a manor in Chestfield. Wattle and daub is identified along the sunken floor of the old huts. A later midden was discovered, seeming to be dumping site of mollusc shells, animals bones and domestic waste. Pot sherds were found dated to 1075 to 1125 and later 1200 to 1275.

=== Chestfield Manor ===
Chestfield Manor

Bishop of Bayeux held Chestfield Manor as Tenant-in-Chief in the Doomsday Book. The manor was granted to Henry Reynar in the reign of Edward II. Henry died without a male heir and left it to his daughters. The manor was then in the hands of the Boteler Family during Edward III. By the late half of King Richard II’s reign, it was sold off to the Roper family. The family name held ownership until the death of John Roper in 1524. The estate was passed down jointly to Edward Dering and Sir Rowland Wynne. The Lypeatt Family were landlords the mansion until 1790. Trials of copper sulphate was performed 1923 along two plots of infested with weeds. The owner of the farm was Mr Reaves from the previous Mr Goodhew, whom retired in 1920. Though the crop itself showed brown scorching, the test was deemed as a success and by a few months no weed was present.

== Governance ==
There are two levels of local government covering Chestfield: the City of Canterbury district, and the county of Kent. For elections to the district council, it forms part of the Chestfield and Swalecliffe electoral ward, represented by Liberal Democrat James Flanagan and Alex Ricketts. For elections to Kent County Council, it is in Canterbury North electoral division.

== Demographics ==
At the 2021 census, the civil parish had a population of 3,132 people in 1,319 households.

Census population of Chestfield parish
Census	Population	Female	Male	Households	Source
2001	2,915	1,480	1,435	1,207	
2011	3,214	1,672	1,542	1,305	
2021	3,132	1,628	1,504	1,319	

== Transport ==
Sainsbury's Supermarket, Chestfield

Chestfield & Swalecliffe railway station is on the Chatham Main Line a straight two-track line which marks the northern boundary of the parish. A footpath and a road each lead to the nearby Radfall. Thanet Way provides a goods and long-distance commute. There is a bus station at Maydown Road for Stagecoach route 5, which links Chestfield to Canterbury, Whitstable and Seasalter.

== Sport ==
- Chestfield is home to Whitstable Rugby Football Club

== See also ==
- Saxon Shore Way - this links to various footpaths in the area.
- Listed buildings in Chestfield
