= Philip Russell Diplock =

British architect (1927–2019)

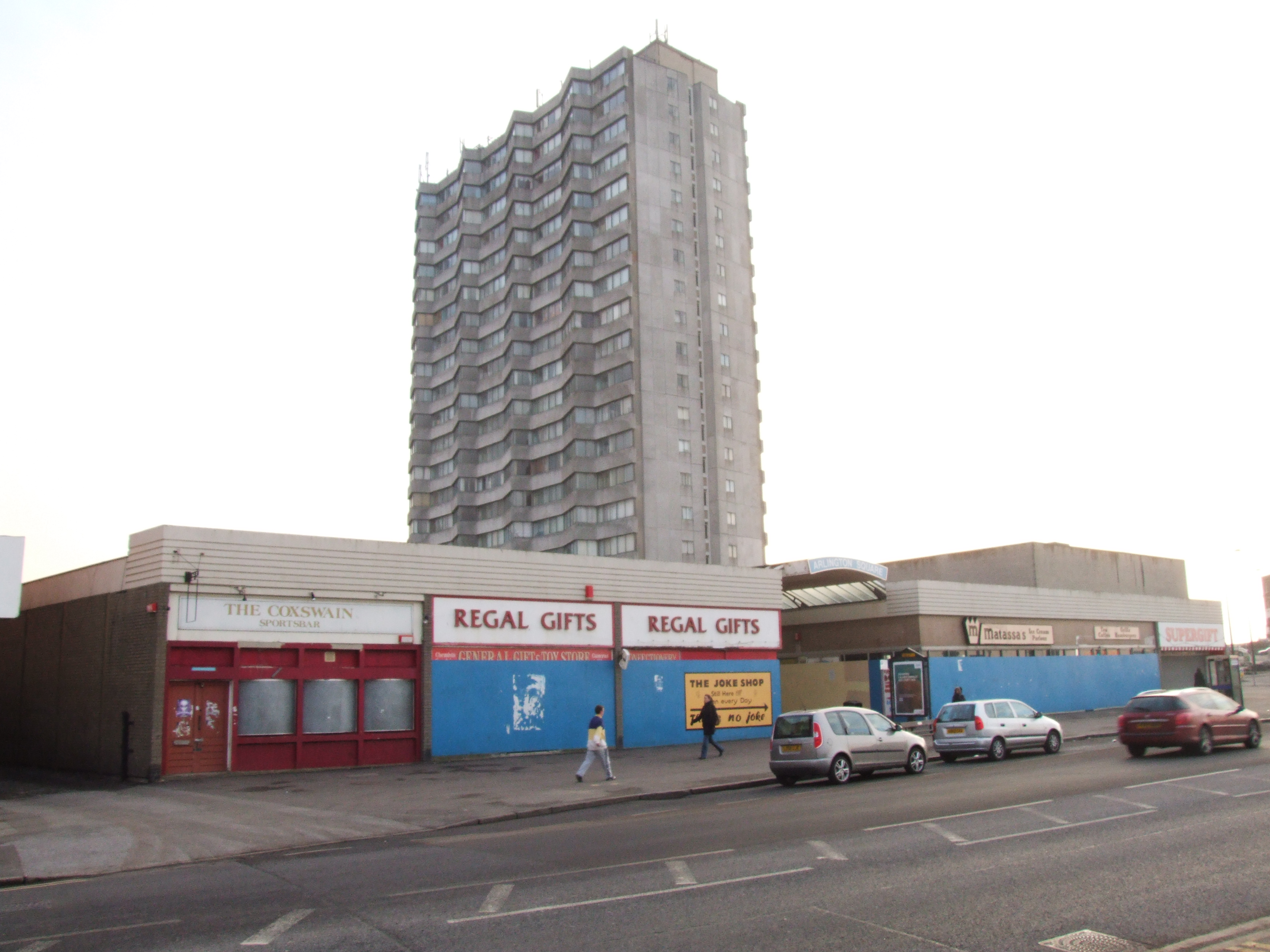
Arlington House, Margate

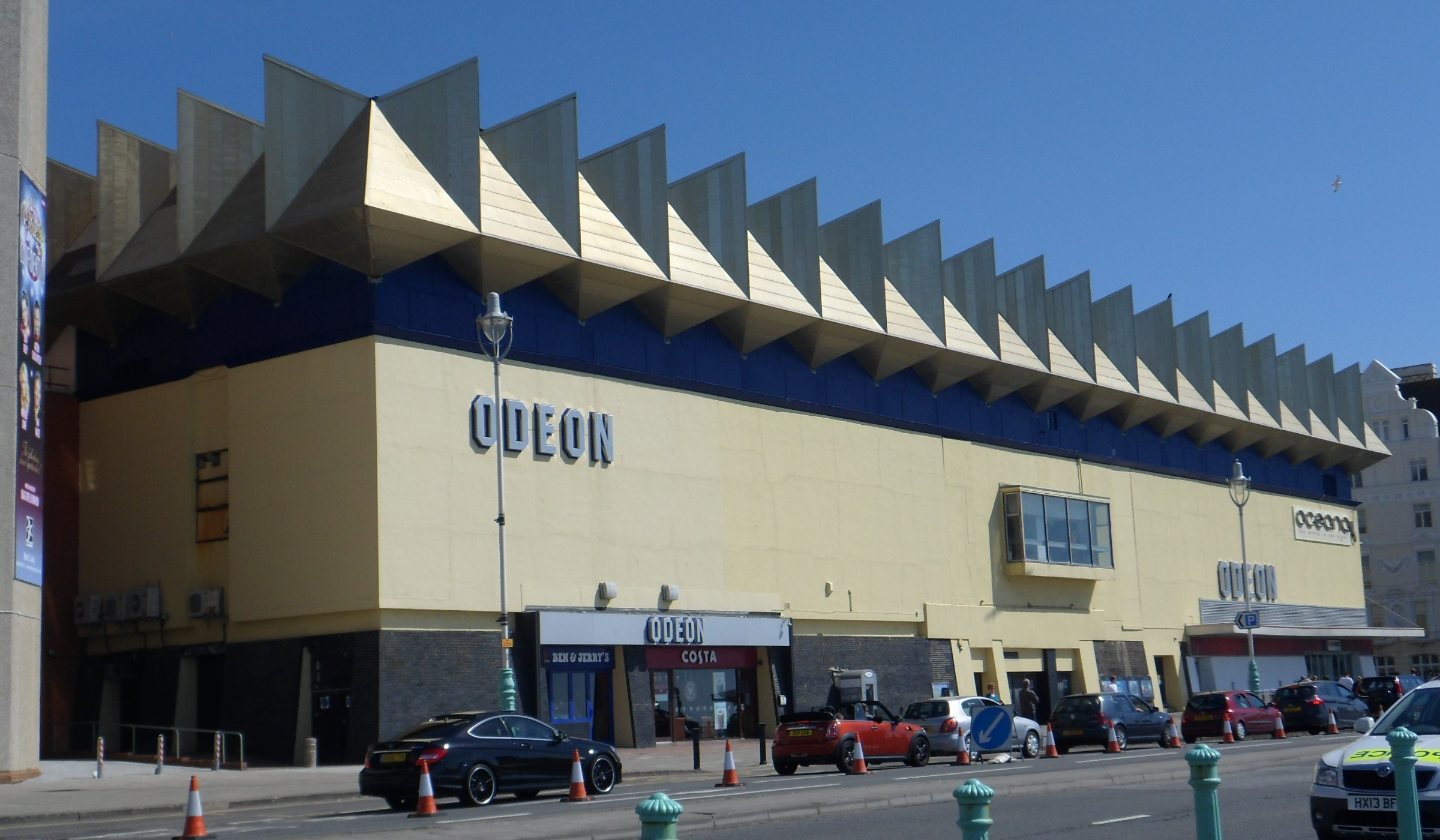
The Kingswest Centre, Brighton (now the Odeon Kingswest Cinema)

Philip Russell Diplock (13 November 1927 – 27 July 2019) was a British architect who was the founder of Russell Diplock & Associates.

== Early life ==
Philip Russell Diplock was born on 13 November 1927, in London as the son of Philip Bernard Diplock (a manager at Capital and Counties Bank) and Elsie Margaret Diplock (née Besley). His younger brother was Professor Anthony Diplock, former Chair of Biochemistry at Guys and Kings Medical School London. Kenneth Diplock, Baron Diplock is a distant cousin.

== Career ==
Diplock founded Russell Diplock & Associates, an architectural firm. It designed the 18-storey modernist Arlington House, Margate, which was built in 1964 by the contractors Bernard Sunley & Sons. They also designed numerous buildings in the Brighton area.

== Death ==
Diplock died in Sark on 27 July 2019, at the age of 91.
