= Russell Diplock & Associates =

British architectural firm

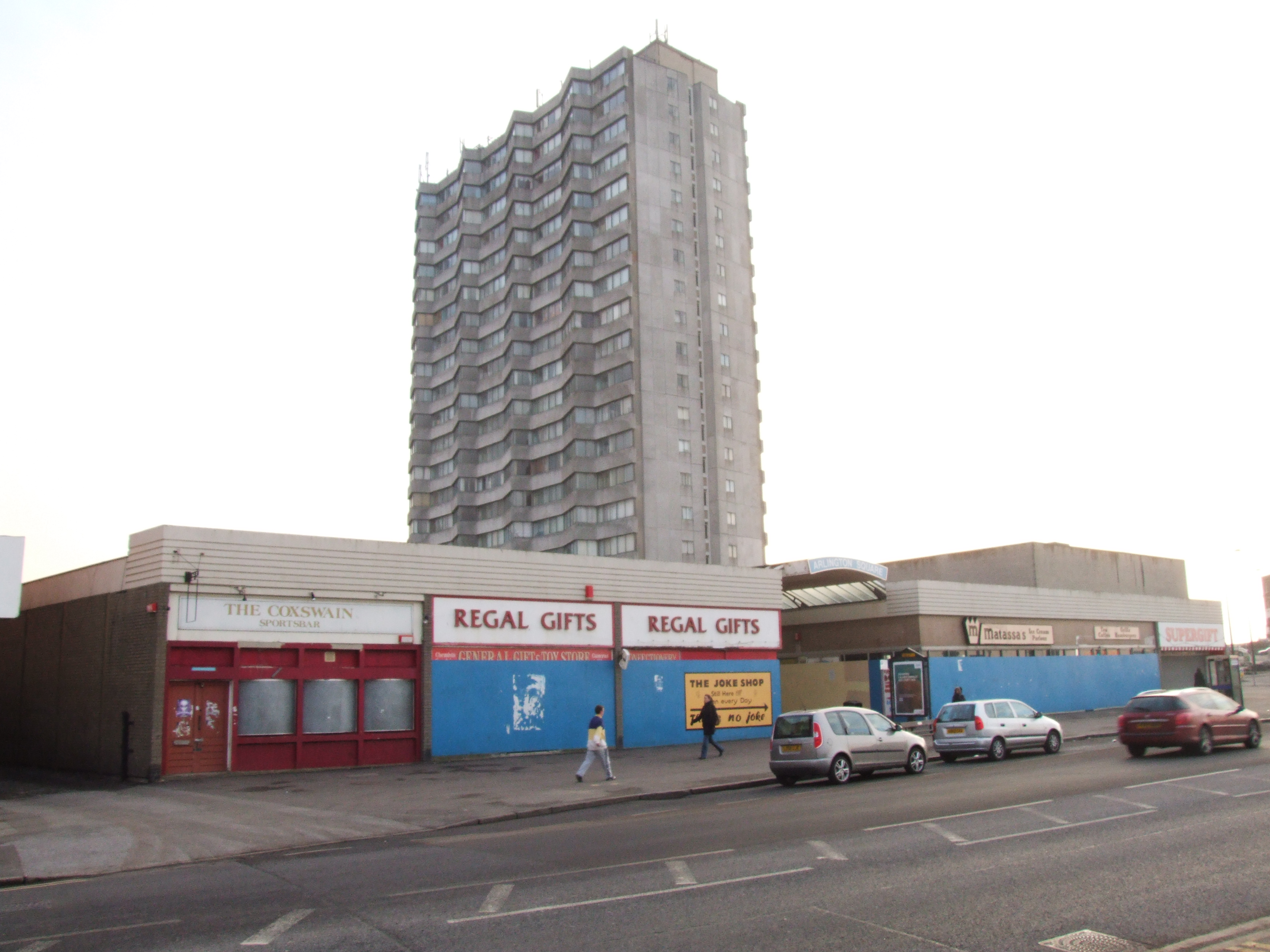
Arlington House, Margate

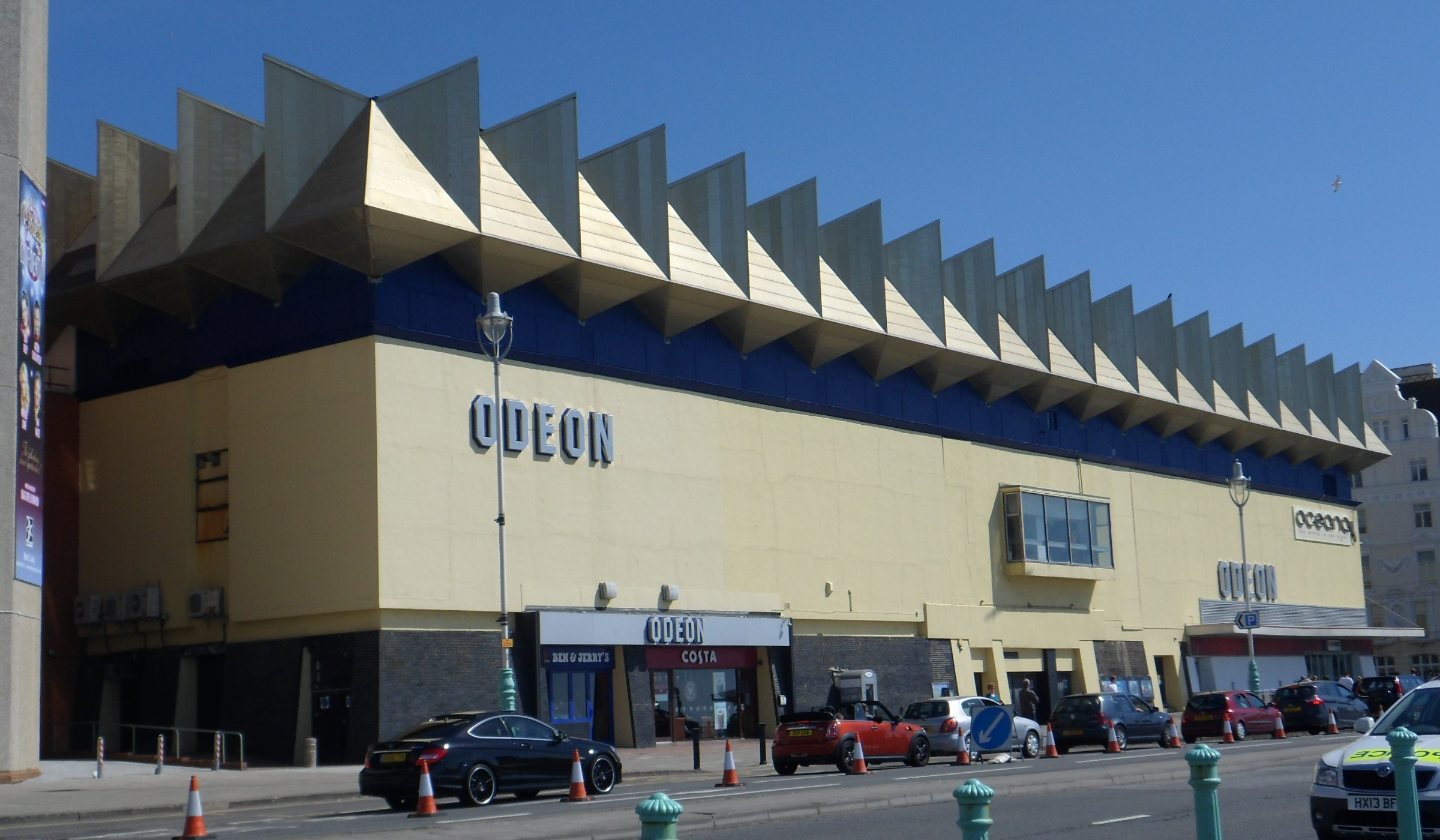
The Kingswest Centre, Brighton (now the Odeon Kingswest Cinema)

Russell Diplock & Associates was a British firm of architects, founded by Philip Russell Diplock.

They designed a three-storey office block for Amalgamated Dental Prosthetic Products in 1957 on an industrial estate between Addlestone and Weybridge in Surrey. In 1961, the Russell Diplock-designed Ariel Hotel was built at what is now London Heathrow Airport, "Britain’s first significant airport hotel".

They designed the 18-storey modernist Arlington House, Margate, which was built in 1964 by the contractors Bernard Sunley & Sons.

From 1959 they were engaged in major projects in Brighton for Brighton Borough Council. In that year they were chosen as designers for the Churchill Square shopping centre complex, fulfilling a redevelopment plan which had been debated since 1935. The complex consisted of an open shopping mall in the Brutalist style, a multi-storey car park, office blocks and an 18-storey block of flats called Chartwell Court; three similar-sized tower blocks had originally been planned. Churchill Square covered 11 acres (4.5 ha) between Western Road and the seafront, a prime central location previously occupied by terraced houses. It was completely redeveloped by another firm of architects in 1995–98. Next, as part of the same redevelopment scheme, the firm was responsible for the "intrusively aggressive" Kingswest Centre, built in 1965 and converted from a conference centre into a cinema in 1973. The bronzed aluminium roof has a distinctive jagged outline. Also in the Brutalist style, and making extensive use of unrelieved concrete, was the adjacent Brighton Centre—a new conference centre and performance venue. Russell Diplock & Associates designed this between 1974 and 1977. It was derided as "unlovely ... grim [and] monolithic" in the Pevsner Architectural Guides.

== Bibliography ==
- Antram, Nicholas; Pevsner, Nikolaus (2013). Sussex: East with Brighton and Hove. The Buildings of England. London: Yale University Press. ISBN 978-0-300-18473-0.
- Nairn, Ian; Pevsner, Nikolaus (1971) [1962]. The Buildings of England: Surrey (2nd ed.). Harmondsworth: Penguin Books. ISBN 0-300-09675-5.
