= Diplock =

Diplock may refer to:

== People ==
- Bramah Joseph Diplock, 1903 inventor of the pedrail wheel
- Kenneth Diplock, Baron Diplock (1907–1985), English judge and Law Lord
- Les Diplock (1899–1983), Australian politician
- Philip Russell Diplock (born 1927), British architect

== Other ==
- Diplock courts, courts without jury established in Northern Ireland in an attempt to overcome jury intimidation, following the recommendation by Baron Diplock
- Diplock Glacier, a glacier in Antarctica
