= Ariel Hotel =

Hotel in London

The Ariel Hotel
- The Ariel Hotel in 2024, branded as a Best Western
- Interactive map of the The Ariel Hotel area

General information
- Location: London Heathrow Airport, England
- Coordinates: 51.48124°N 0.43368°W
- Completed: 1960
- Client: J Lyons and Co.

Design and construction
- Architect: Russell Diplock & Associates

Website
- www.bestwestern.co.uk/hotels/best-western-london-heathrow-ariel-hotel-84316

The Ariel Hotel is a circular hotel very close to London Heathrow Airport.

The hotel was built for J. Lyons and Co. in 1960, and designed by Russell Diplock & Associates. It was "Britain’s first significant airport hotel", and the first hotel to be built at 'London Airport' (as it was known up to 1966), its completion being timed to coincide with the opening of the Oceanic Terminal (now Terminal 3). It was opened by Queen Elizabeth II on 16 December 1960.

According to a promotional fold-out brochure published by the hotel in March 1962, the hotel's name referenced the 1842 Aerial Steam Carriage monoplane design of William Samuel Henson and John Stringfellow. The brochure explained “In a sense the ‘Ariel’ is an ancestor of the great airliners… [and today] the name ‘Ariel’ is once more important in the world of flying. The Ariel Hotel, the first circular hotel in Europe, stands beside London Airport”.

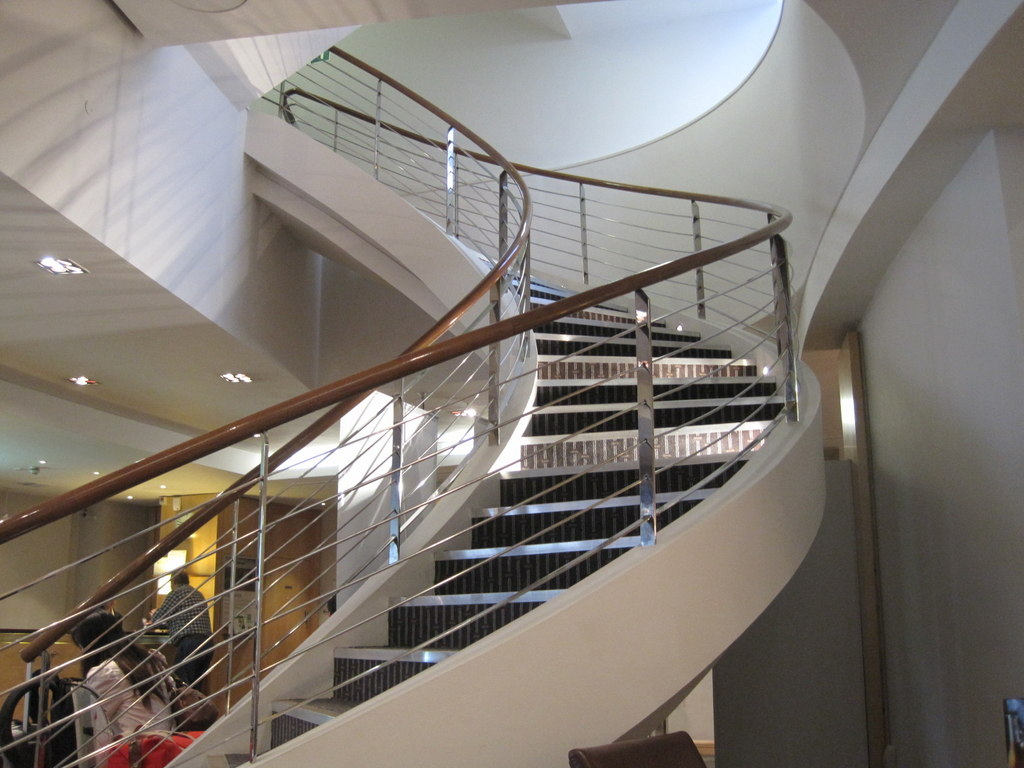
The spiral staircase is an original design feature of the hotel

The hotel was built with 185 rooms, and its doughnut design allows it to offer dedicated single-bed rooms around the inside ring, an unusual feature among Heathrow hotels.

It was acquired in 1978 by the Forte Group as a Posthouse, and in 2001 it was bought by Bass/Six Continents which became the InterContinental Hotels Group (IHG) which put it in their Holiday Inn brand. After a couple of ownership changes, in 2015 the hotel was managed by the Redefine BDL Hotels (RBH) group who continued to run it as a Holiday Inn franchise. As of 2023 the hotel operates under the Best Western brand to which it transferred around 2021. It is advertised as having 184 rooms.

On 15 February 2020, the hotel became a temporary quarantine centre during the COVID-19 pandemic and was closed to the general public for around a month.

As of June 2024, the website appears to be accepting bookings as normal.
