= Matt Warman =

British Conservative politician

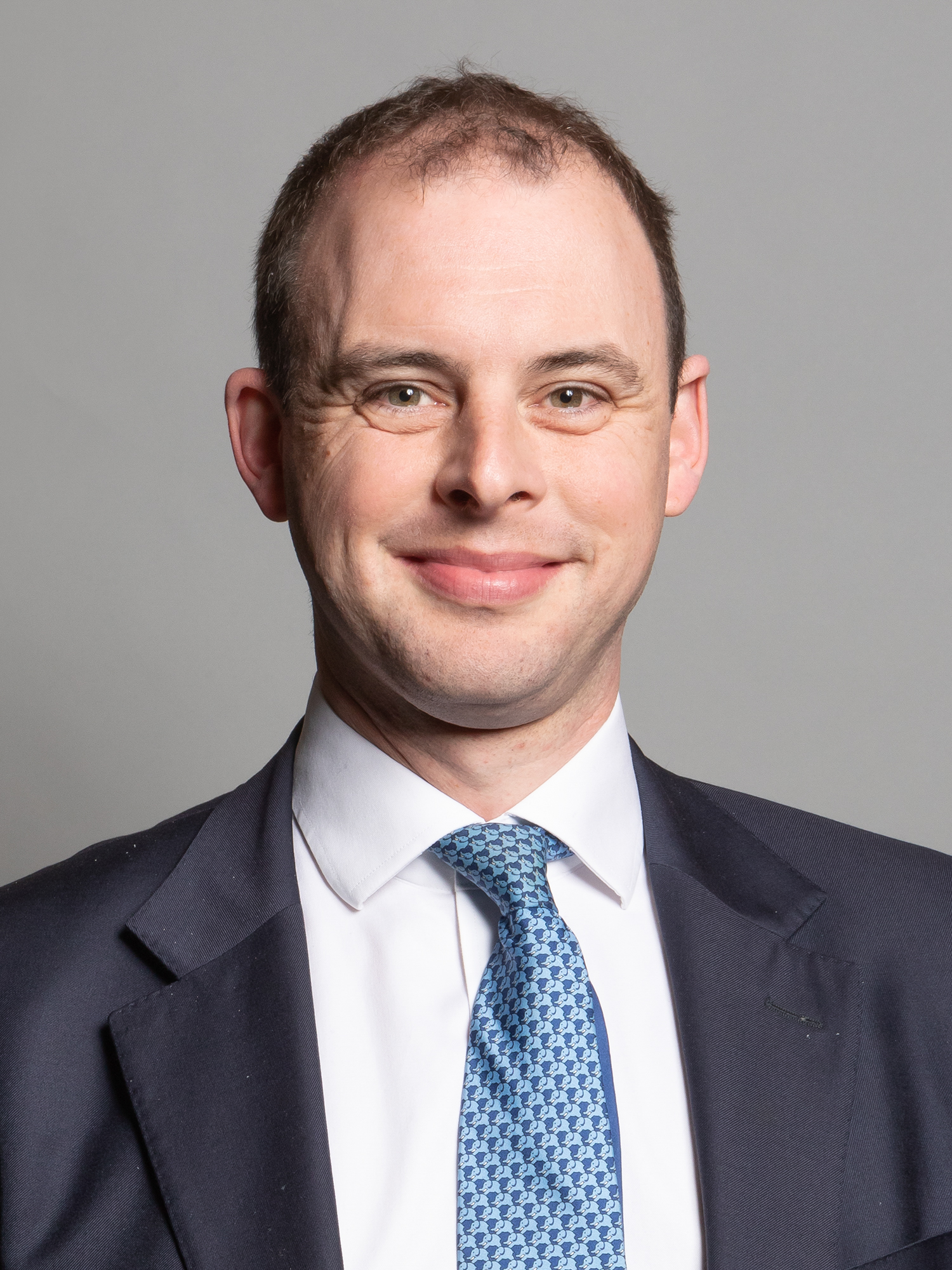
- Official portrait, 2020

Minister of State for Digital, Culture, Media and Sport
- In office 7 July 2022 – 7 September 2022
- Prime Minister: Boris Johnson
- Preceded by: Julia Lopez
- Succeeded by: Julia Lopez

Parliamentary Under-Secretary of State for Digital Infrastructure
- In office 26 July 2019 – 16 September 2021
- Prime Minister: Boris Johnson
- Preceded by: Margot James
- Succeeded by: Chris Philp

Member of Parliament for Boston and Skegness
- In office 7 May 2015 – 30 May 2024
- Preceded by: Mark Simmonds
- Succeeded by: Richard Tice

Personal details
- Born: 1 September 1981 (age 45) Enfield, London, England
- Party: Conservative
- Education: Durham University (BA)

Matthew Robert Warman (born 1 September 1981) is a British Conservative Party politician and former journalist who served as the Member of Parliament (MP) for Boston and Skegness from 2015 to 2024. He served as Minister of State at the Department for Digital, Culture, Media and Sport from July to September 2022. Warman was an Assistant Government Whip from April 2019 to July 2019. He served as a Parliamentary Under-Secretary of State for Digital Infrastructure from July 2019 to September 2021.

== Early life and career ==
Matthew Warman was born on 1 September 1981 in Enfield, London, and was educated at Haberdashers' Aske's Boys' School in Elstree, Hertfordshire. He then studied English at Durham University. Whilst at university, he was Treasurer of Durham Student Theatre for the 2002/2003 academic year.

Warman worked for The Daily Telegraph from 1999 until 2015, focusing on technology, where he led coverage of Facebook, Google and Apple, and covering the launch of products including iPhones, BBC iPlayer and the Apple Watch, as well as interviewing key figures including the founder of Amazon, Jeff Bezos, and Sir Tim Berners-Lee, the inventor of the World Wide Web.

== Parliamentary career ==
At the 2015 general election, Warman was elected to Parliament as MP for Boston and Skegness with 43.8% of the vote and a majority of 4,336.

Warman was a member of the Science and Technology Select Committee, and a former co-chair of the All-Party Parliamentary Group on Broadband and Digital Communication and Pictfor (The Parliamentary Internet, Communications and Technology Forum).

Warman was opposed to Brexit prior to the 2016 referendum. However, his constituency voted with the highest proportion of any constituency in the UK to leave, with 75.6% of voters casting their vote to leave. Despite his previous opposition, after the referendum he was listed as a supporter of pro-Brexit lobby group Leave Means Leave.

At the snap 2017 general election, Warman was re-elected as MP for Boston and Skegness with an increased vote share of 63.6% and an increased majority of 16,572.

Warman became a Parliamentary Under-Secretary of State at the Department for Digital, Culture, Media and Sport on 26 July 2019, serving as the Parliamentary Under-Secretary of State for Digital Infrastructure. He was replaced on 16 September 2021 by Chris Philp.

At the 2019 general election, Warman was again re-elected with an increased vote share of 76.7% and an increased majority of 25,621.

He was made Minister of State at the Department for Digital, Culture, Media and Sport in July 2022 as part of the caretaker government by outgoing Prime Minister Boris Johnson.

At the 2024 general election, Warman lost his seat to Richard Tice of Reform UK, coming in second place with a decreased vote share of 33.4% compared to the 2019 election.

== Post-parliamentary career ==
In September 2024, Warman announced he had put himself forward to be the Conservative candidate for the 2025 Greater Lincolnshire mayoral election. He made it onto a six-man shortlist for the position, but missed out on the nomination which went to Rob Waltham following a selection event at Lincoln's Bishop Grosseteste University in December 2024.

Warman has found employment as a senior advisor at global professional services form Alvarez & Marsal and is a member of the Board at UKAI.

Parliament of the United Kingdom
Preceded by Mark Simmonds	Member of Parliament for Boston and Skegness; 2015–2024	Succeeded by Richard Tice
Political offices
Preceded by Margot James as Minister of State for Digital and Creative Industries	Parliamentary Under-Secretary of State for Digital Infrastructure; 2019–2021	Succeeded by Chris Philp
