= Boston and Skegness =

UK Parliament constituency (since 1997)

Coordinates: 53.00°N 0.02°E

- County constituency for the House of Commons
- Interactive map of boundaries since 2024
- Location within the East Midlands
- County: Lincolnshire
- Population: 101,684 (2011 census)
- Electorate: 75,806 (March 2020)
- Major settlements: Boston, Hubberts Bridge, Skegness, Swineshead, Wainfleet

Current constituency
- Created: 1997
- Member of Parliament: Richard Tice (Reform UK)
- Seats: One
- Created from: Holland with Boston and East Lindsey

Boston and Skegness is a constituency in Lincolnshire represented in the House of Commons of the UK Parliament by Richard Tice of Reform UK since the 2024 general election. Like all British constituencies, it elects one Member of Parliament (MP) by the first-past-the-post system of election. Prior to Tice's election, it was considered a safe seat for the Conservatives.

The constituency was created in 1997, from parts of the former constituencies of Holland with Boston and East Lindsey. Until 2024 it had always elected a Conservative MP. In the 1997 and 2001 general elections, the seat was very marginal, with majorities of less than 1,000 votes for the Conservative candidate over the Labour candidate. The next two general elections, in 2005 and 2010, saw large swings towards the Conservatives. In the 2015 general election, the Eurosceptic UK Independence Party (UKIP) overtook Labour to take second place in the constituency; the party won 33.8% of the vote in the seat, which was UKIP's second-highest vote share in any constituency in that election (after Clacton). The seat had been one of UKIP's top target seats in that election, as they had also performed strongly in the constituency at the two previous general elections.

The constituency is estimated to have had the highest vote share in favour of leaving the European Union (EU) in the 2016 EU membership referendum, at 75.6%. For this reason, the leader of UKIP, Paul Nuttall, stood as the party's candidate in the seat in the 2017 general election. UKIP's vote share fell nationally that election; they dropped to third place (behind Labour) with 7.7% of the vote in Boston and Skegness, the party's third largest percentage drop in vote share. In the 2019 general election, the Conservatives increased their majority further, winning 76.7% of the vote. This was their second-highest vote share in the election (after Castle Point). The seat was also the second-safest Conservative seat in that election (measured by swing needed for the second-place party to gain the seat), after the neighbouring seat of South Holland and The Deepings.

== Boundaries ==
=== Historic ===
In England, constituency boundaries are determined by the Boundary Commission for England, an independent body which periodically reviews the size of each constituency based on demographic data; these changes must be approved by the UK Parliament. The constituency of Boston and Skegness was created as a county constituency, (Note: Constituencies in the United Kingdom are legally designated as either county constituencies or borough constituencies. In general, county constituencies are any constituencies where more than a small proportion of the constituency is rural. Legally, campaign spending limits are higher in county constituencies than in borough constituencies, and the two categories of seats have different types of returning officers.) by a statutory instrument in 1994, as part of the Fourth periodic review of Westminster constituencies, and was first contested in the 1997 general election. When formed, it consisted of the Borough of Boston and the wards of Burgh le Marsh, Friskney, Frithville, Ingoldmells, St Clement's, Scarbrough, Seacroft, Sibsey, Wainfleet, and Winthorpe in the District of East Lindsey. The constituency was largely created from parts of the former Holland with Boston constituency, with the remainder previously part of the former seat of East Lindsey.

The constituency boundaries changed at the 2010 general election as part of the Fifth periodic review of Westminster constituencies, bringing in the two wards of Stickney and Croft from the neighbouring constituency of Louth and Horncastle. The constituency then consisted of the Borough of Boston, and the District of East Lindsey wards of Burgh le Marsh, Croft, Frithville, Ingoldmells, St Clement's, Scarbrough, Seacroft, Sibsey, Stickney, Wainfleet and Friskney, and Winthorpe. The original proposal from the Boundary Commission had been to only transfer the Croft ward, but it was then decided to also include the ward of Stickney because of its ties with the town of Boston.

The Sixth Periodic Review of Westminster constituencies was carried out between 2011 and 2018. The review recommended that two wards – Heckington Rural, and Kirkby la Thorpe and South Kyme – be transferred to Boston and Skegness from the constituency of Sleaford and North Hykeham; however the review was not implemented and its results were formally laid aside in 2020.

Boston and Skegness is bordered by the constituencies of Louth and Horncastle to the north, Sleaford and North Hykeham to the west, and South Holland and The Deepings to the south; all three of these constituencies are in the county of Lincolnshire and are all considered safe Conservative seats, and have been represented by MPs from the party since the formation of the constituencies in 1997. Indeed, after the 2019 general election, all seven Parliamentary constituencies in Lincolnshire had a Conservative MP.

=== Current ===
Further to the 2023 review of Westminster constituencies, which came into effect for the 2024 general election, the composition of the constituency is as follows (as they existed on 1 December 2020):

- The Borough of Boston.
- The District of East Lindsey wards of Burgh le Marsh; Chapel St. Leonards; Croft; Friskney; Ingoldmells; St. Clement's; Scarbrough & Seacroft; Sibsey & Stickney; Wainfleet; Willoughby with Sloothby; Winthorpe.

The constituency was expanded to include the two East Lindsey District wards of Chapel St Leonards and Willoughby with Sloothby, transferred from Louth and Horncastle.

== Constituency profile ==
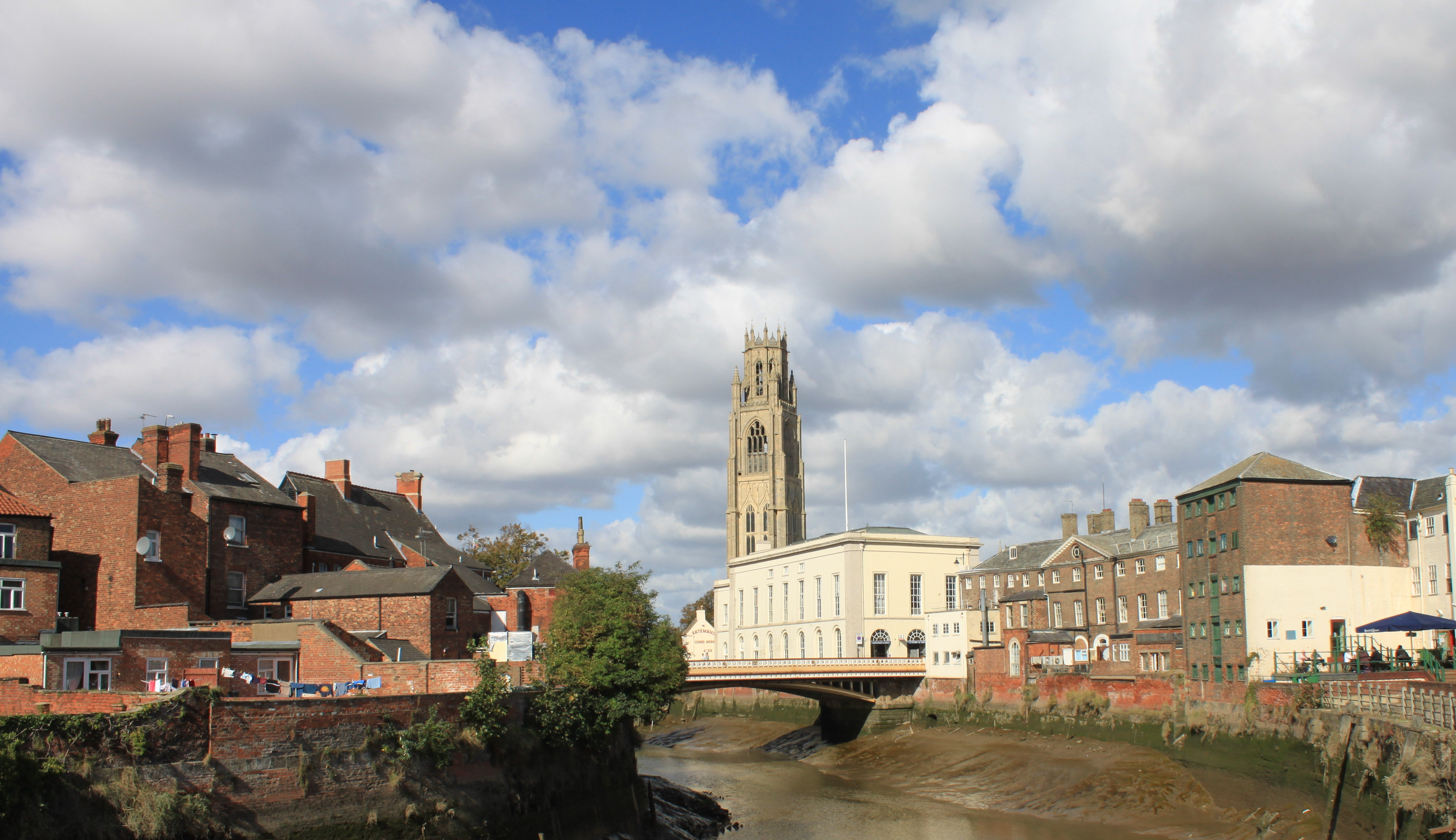
Boston, with the spire of St Botolph's Church (the 'Boston Stump') in the background

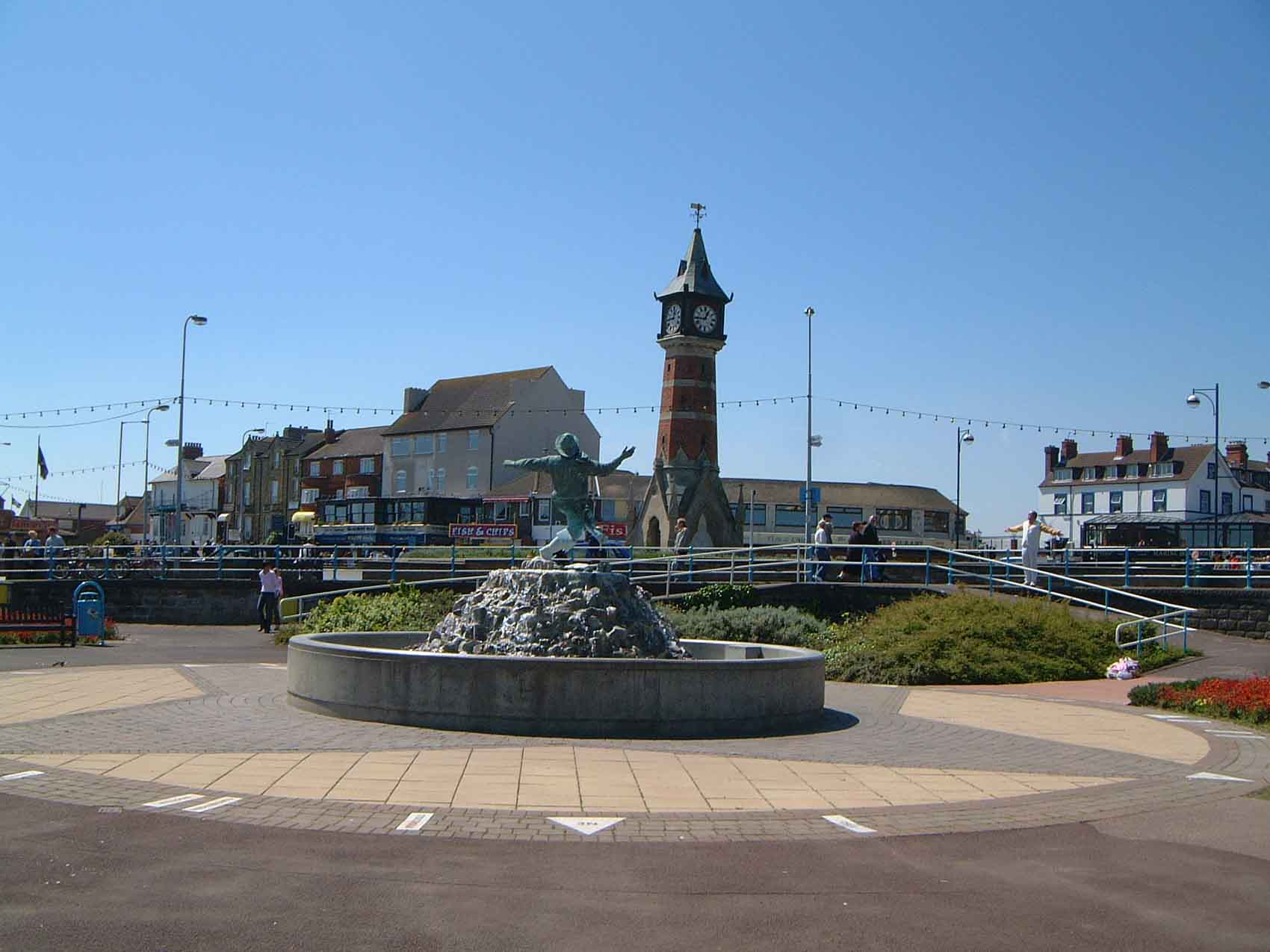
The centre of Skegness with its clock-tower

The market town of Boston is an important administrative centre for rural Lincolnshire, and its modernised port, which brings thousands of tonnes of steel, timber and paper into the constituency, a key employer. Light industry and food processing are the other major industries in the town and surrounding villages, but elsewhere agriculture remains dominant. The resort of Skegness has recovered from a damaging dip in trade caused by pit closures in the East Midlands during the 1980s, and following regeneration through millions of pounds in EU grants, is now one of Britain's most popular resorts, particularly among the elderly during the winter months.

— BBC News, 2001

Boston, Lincolnshire, is a historic town, famous for the tower of St Botolph's Church, known by locals as the "Stump". Skegness is a seaside town and holiday destination; the first Butlins resort opened in Skegness in 1936.

The constituency has a lower level of qualifications (measured by National Vocational Qualifications) than the East Midlands average and the average for Great Britain; in 2018, 19.7% of the adult population had a Higher National Diploma or degree-level qualification, compared to the British average of 39.3%. The 2015 data also found that the median house price in the constituency was £125 000. In 2019, the average gross weekly pay for people working full-time was £462, lower the average for Great Britain, which was £587. The most common jobs are process plant and machine operatives and sales and customer service occupations. Around 40% of workers work in one of these areas, more than twice the national average. The constituency also has a lower employment rate and a higher level of people on unemployment benefits than the averages for the region and the country.

According to the 2011 UK Census, Boston was "home to a higher proportion of Eastern European immigrants than anywhere else in England and Wales". People born in other EU countries, most of whom came from Eastern Europe after the 2004 enlargement of the European Union, made up 13% of the town's population. The BBC described the town as "one of the most extreme examples in Britain of a town affected by recent EU immigration". In 2015, 11.3% of people living in the constituency were born outside the UK. The average age in the constituency was 32 at the time.

== History ==
Like all UK Parliament constituencies, Boston and Skegness elects one Member of Parliament (MP) using the first-past-the-post voting system.

=== 1997–2001: Marginal seat between Conservatives and Labour ===
The constituency was created in 1997 from parts of the former constituencies of Holland with Boston and East Lindsey. The in part predecessor area's veteran MP Richard Body, who had been MP for Holland with Boston between 1966 and 1997, held the seat at the 1997 general election with a 1.4% majority (647 votes). The seat had been formed from two constituencies held by the Conservatives with large majorities, and a Conservative victory was seen as very likely. However, the election result nationally was a landslide victory for the Labour Party, and Body only narrowly remained in Parliament; the seat was the tenth most marginal Conservative-held seat at the election by percentage majority and the ninth most marginal by absolute majority (number of votes). The academics Robert Waller and Byron Criddle attributed his victory to the Referendum Party's decision not to stand, which they did because of Body's Eurosceptic views.

After retiring from Parliament, Body left the Conservatives and joined the UK Independence Party (UKIP), a party that supported British withdrawal from the European Union (EU), though he encouraged people to vote Conservative at the 2005 general election. His membership later lapsed and he defected to the English Democrats, a small far-right party.

Body's successor, the Conservative Mark Simmonds, won an even smaller majority of 1.3% over Labour in the 2001 general election (515 votes). The seat was described by Waller and Criddle as "an exceptionally tight two-way marginal". The seat was the fourth most marginal Conservative seat at that election (by both percentage and absolute majority) and the most marginal Conservative seat with Labour in second place.

=== 2001–2010: Labour support falls, UKIP perform strongly ===
In the 2005 general election, Simmonds increased his majority over Labour to 14.1%. The seat had the 139th largest absolute majority and the 131st largest percentage majority out of the 198 Conservative seats. Richard Horsnell, the candidate for the anti-European Union party UKIP (United Kingdom Independence Party) came third with 9.6%. This was UKIP's highest vote share in any seat in the 2005 general election, with the exception of South Staffordshire, where UKIP won 10.4% after the election was delayed due to the death of a candidate. UKIP also performed strongly in several local council elections in Boston on the same day, winning more than 20% of the vote in some wards. Overall, UKIP won 2.2% of the national vote and won an average of 2.8% in the seats they stood candidates in. Meanwhile, the Liberal Democrats fell from third to fourth place with just 8.7% of the vote; this was the party's seventh-lowest vote share in any seat, and third-lowest vote share in a constituency in England, in the election. Waller and Criddle said that the constituency "now looks like a fairly safe Tory [Conservative] seat", though Labour had hoped to win the seat in the election.

After his re-election, Simmonds was appointed Shadow Minister for International Development in May 2005, before being moved to be a Shadow Health Minister in July 2007.

In the 2010 general election, Simmonds increased his majority over Labour further, winning almost half the vote compared to Labour's 20.6%. The Liberal Democrats came third, while UKIP achieved fourth place; their candidate Christopher Pain won 9.5% of the vote. This share of the vote was similar to the result in the previous election, and was UKIP's second-highest in 2010, after the special case of Buckingham. (Note: Buckingham was at the time the seat of the Speaker of the House of Commons, John Bercow; the Speaker is seen as neutral and is traditionally not challenged by major parties. The Conservatives, Labour and the Liberal Democrats did not stand in the seat in the 2010 general election, but several minor party and independent candidates, including Farage, contested the seat and the race was seen as unusually competitive. Farage came third, behind Bercow and an independent candidate, John Stevens.) The far-right British National Party (BNP) also performed strongly in the constituency, winning 5.3% of the vote; since this was more than 5%, the party saved their deposit.

=== 2010–2015: Conservatives challenged by UKIP ===
Following the 2010 general election, Simmonds became Parliamentary Private Secretary to Caroline Spelman, the Secretary of State for Environment, Food & Rural Affairs. Following the 2012 cabinet reshuffle, he became the Under-Secretary of State for Foreign Affairs a junior role in the Foreign and Commonwealth Office.

The polling company Survation analysed the results of the 2013 local elections and estimated that if UKIP were to perform equally well in a general election, then they would gain the constituency with an 11% majority. Of the ten constituencies that Survation predicted UKIP would win, Boston and Skegness had the largest predicted UKIP majority. UKIP performed strongly in and near the town of Boston, which was historically a safe Conservative area; this was seen as a surprise and was attributed to voters being concerned about immigration and feeling ignored by politicians. Afterwards, there was some media speculation that Nigel Farage, the leader of UKIP, might stand in the constituency at the next general election; Simmonds said he "would be delighted" if Farage did, as it would give issues in the constituency more attention.

In the 2014 European Parliament election, which UKIP won ahead of Labour and the Conservatives, the Borough of Boston had the highest UKIP vote share in the country. The party gained 52% of votes in the borough, followed by the Conservatives and then Labour. This led to the constituency being seen as a top target for UKIP in the next general election.

On 11 August 2014, Simmonds resigned as a minister and announced that he would step down as the Member of Parliament for Boston and Skegness at the 2015 general election. Explaining his decision, he said that his salary and expenses of over £100,000 were not enough to maintain a home in London, which he said caused "intolerable" pressure in his family life. This attracted some criticism, as Simmonds' salary was several times larger than the average salary in his constituency. There was also media speculation that he stood down due to the threat of UKIP gaining the seat.

After Simmonds announced that he would not stand at the 2015 general election, the local Conservatives decided to select their candidate using the open primary system. Interviews were used to narrow down the number of applicants to four, with the winner then being chosen at a public meeting that all voters in the constituency could attend and vote in. Several rounds of voting were used; the first two rounds, with 81 votes cast in each, both eliminated one candidate; the first candidate eliminated was Paul Bristow, who later won the seat of Peterborough in 2019. The third round saw 80 votes cast with a tie between the journalist Matt Warman and the headteacher Tim Clark. Another vote between the two was held, which was won by Warman, then the head of technology at The Daily Telegraph. Warman, who was 33 at the time of the primary, argued that UKIP's support in the area was partly due to "a real disconnect between voters and politicians"; his wife's family lived in the constituency.

The seat had been one of UKIP's top target seats in that election. The journalist and commentator Iain Dale predicted in February 2015 that UKIP would gain the seat, writing "[if] UKIP are to make a breakthrough, it might well be here"; overall, Dale predicted that UKIP would make five gains at the election. Two opinion polls of the constituency were carried out prior to the 2015 general election. A poll in September 2014 predicted a UKIP majority of 19%, while a 2015 poll forecast a narrow Conservative majority of 3%. However, an internal poll conducted by UKIP (not released to the public) close to the election found a Conservative lead of seven points.

On the day of the election, 8 May 2015, Warman was duly elected as the Member of Parliament; the Conservative majority shrunk to 10% with the UKIP candidate Robin Hunter-Clarke, a councillor on the Lincolnshire County Council, coming in second place. Warman won 43.8% of the vote in the seat, while Hunter-Clarke achieved 33.8%, which was UKIP's second-highest vote share in any constituency in that election (after Clacton, the only constituency the party won). UKIP increased their vote share by 24.3% compared to the previous general election, while the Conservative share of the vote fell by 5.7%; this was the seventh-largest increase in vote share achieved by UKIP at the election. Out of the 650 constituencies in the United Kingdom, the seat was the 126th most marginal in terms of percentage majority and 115th most marginal when measured by number of votes.

=== 2015–2019: Brexit vote, becoming a safe Conservative seat ===
Warman's maiden speech discussed the positive and negative effects of immigration on Boston and Skegness, saying that the pressures on public services "allowed divisive, single-issue political campaigns to flourish". Warman supported remaining in the European Union in the 2016 EU membership referendum. Nevertheless, the constituency is estimated to have had the highest vote share in favour of leaving the European Union (EU) in the EU referendum, at 75.6%. (Note: The results of the EU referendum were measured in counting areas, not by constituency, and the exact result for most constituencies (including Boston and Skegness) is not known, but the researcher Chris Hanretty has made estimates. Of the 382 counting areas, which were generally based on local authorities, the Borough of Boston (which lies entirely within the constituency of Boston and Skegness), had the largest level of support for leaving the EU, at 75.6%.)

On 29 April 2017, Paul Nuttall, the leader of UKIP at the time, announced that he was standing in Boston and Skegness, noting that the constituency had the highest Leave vote in the country. Shortly before the election, the BBC described Boston as "Britain's unofficial Brexit capital". Liberal Democrats and Labour also planned to contest the seat, with the Green Party intending to if they could find the funds for a deposit. (The Green Party did stand a candidate, as did a minor party called Blue Revolution that only had one parliamentary candidate in the election.)

Nutall came in third place (with Labour second), winning just 7.7% of the vote; this was a decrease of 26.1% compared to 2015, and the third-largest percentage fall in UKIP vote share in that election. UKIP's share of the vote fell nationally in that election, and the result was still their seventh-highest vote share of any seat. The election saw UKIP achieve their worst result in the constituency since the 2001 general election. The Conservative majority increased to an all-time high in the seat, while Labour had their best result since 2005, achieving 25% of the votes cast. The Green Party and Liberal Democrats lost their deposits, mirroring the 2015 election results for both parties. Of the 46 constituencies in the East Midlands region, Boston and Skegness had the third lowest turnout at the election, at 62.7%.

Based on estimates produced by Professor Chris Hanretty of Royal Holloway, University of London, Boston and Skegness had the third-highest vote share for the Brexit Party in the 2019 European Parliament election. According to Hanretty, 56.4% of votes cast in the constituency were for the new anti-EU party, which was led by Farage, behind only Castle Point and Clacton. Hanretty also estimated that the Conservatives came second in the seat, with 12.5% of the vote, followed by UKIP, who won 7.7%, their tenth strongest performance of the election. UKIP were closely followed by the Liberal Democrats and Labour, who came fourth and fifth with 7.5% and 7.4% of the vote respectively.

The seat was discussed in 2019 as a potential target for the Brexit Party in the next general election, due to the high level of support for leaving the European Union in the constituency. The Brexit Party achieved high levels of support in general election polls in June and July, and one estimate, by the website Electoral Calculus, suggested that the Brexit Party would gain Boston and Skegness. However, the Brexit Party support decreased over time, and in the run-up to the 2019 general election, which took place in December, some analysts thought that the large Conservative majority made victory there unlikely. Nigel Farage later announced that the Brexit Party would not stand in any constituency won by the Conservatives in 2017 and the Brexit Party candidate Jonathan Bullock was therefore obliged to stand down just a week after formally launching his general election campaign for the seat. Mr Bullock was also a Member of the European Parliament (MEP) for the East Midlands constituency. UKIP did not stand in the constituency. They stood in only 44 out of 650 British seats at the election. In the election, held on 12 December, the Conservatives further increased their majority, winning 76.7% of the vote. This was the Conservatives' second-highest vote share in the election (after Castle Point). The seat was also the fifteenth safest seat in the election (measured by percentage majority) and the second-safest Conservative seat after neighbouring South Holland and the Deepings.

=== 2019–2024: Reform UK's ascendancy ===
Leading up to the 2024 United Kingdom general election, analysts considered this constituency of interest for Reform UK due to its high Euroscepticism. For this reason, Richard Tice, the party's deputy leader, decided to run in it, reflective of previous major UKIP politicians targeting it for the same reason. Tice ultimately succeeded, managing to overturn the previous Tory MP's majority of 27,402. Based on the party swings, it can be assumed that Tice managed to take many voters who had primarily voted for the Tories in 2019, but did not want to again, demonstrating a nationwide trend against the party.

== Members of Parliament ==
Holland with Boston and East Lindsey prior to 1997

Election	Member	Party
1997	Richard Body	Conservative
2001	Mark Simmonds	Conservative
2015	Matt Warman	Conservative
2024	Richard Tice	Reform UK

== Elections ==
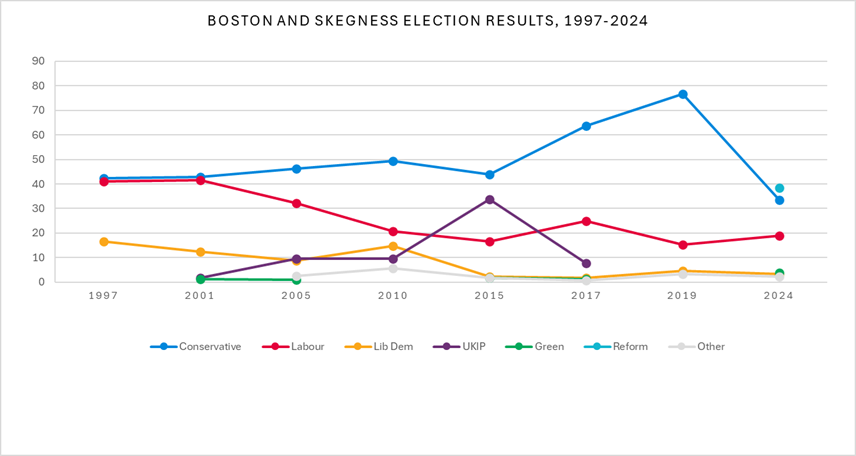
Boston and Skegness election results 1997-2024

=== Elections in the 2020s ===
General election 2024: Boston and Skegness
Party	Candidate	Votes	%	±%
Reform	Richard Tice	15,520	38.4	N/A
Conservative	Matt Warman	13,510	33.4	−43.0
Labour	Alex Fawbert	7,629	18.9	+3.3
Green	Christopher Moore	1,506	3.7	N/A
Liberal Democrats	Richard Lloyd	1,375	3.4	−1.4
English Democrat	David Dickason	518	1.3	N/A
Blue Revolution	Mike Gilbert	397	1.0	N/A
Majority		2,010	5.0	N/A
Turnout		40,455	53.4	−6.0
Registered electors		75,811		
Reform gain from Conservative		Swing		

=== Elections in the 2010s ===
2019 notional result
Party	Vote	%
Conservative	34,406	76.4
Labour	7,004	15.6
Liberal Democrats	2,180	4.8
Independent politician	1,428	3.2
Majority	27,402	60.9
Turnout	45,018	59.4
Electorate	75,806	

General election 2019: Boston and Skegness
Party	Candidate	Votes	%	±%
Conservative	Matt Warman	31,963	76.7	+13.1
Labour	Ben Cook	6,342	15.2	−9.8
Liberal Democrats	Hilary Jones	1,963	4.7	+2.9
Independent	Peter Watson	1,428	3.4	New
Majority		25,621	61.4	+22.9
Turnout		41,696	60.1	−2.6
Conservative hold		Swing	+11.4	

General election 2017: Boston and Skegness
Party	Candidate	Votes	%	±%
Conservative	Matt Warman	27,271	63.6	+19.8
Labour	Paul Kenny	10,699	25.0	+8.5
UKIP	Paul Nuttall	3,308	7.7	−26.1
Liberal Democrats	Philip Smith	771	1.8	−0.5
Green	Victoria Percival	547	1.3	−0.5
Blue Revolution	Mike Gilbert	283	0.7	New
Majority		16,572	38.6	+28.6
Turnout		42,879	62.7	−1.9
Conservative hold		Swing	+5.7	

General election 2015: Boston and Skegness
Party	Candidate	Votes	%	±%
Conservative	Matt Warman	18,981	43.8	−5.6
UKIP	Robin Hunter-Clarke	14,645	33.8	+24.3
Labour	Paul Kenny	7,142	16.5	−4.1
Liberal Democrats	David Watts	1,015	2.3	−12.5
Green	Victoria Percival	800	1.8	New
Independence from Europe	Chris Pain	324	0.7	New
Independent	Peter Johnson	170	0.4	New
The Pilgrim Party	Lyn Luxton	143	0.3	New
BNP	Robert West	119	0.3	−5.0
Majority		4,336	10.0	−18.8
Turnout		43,339	64.6	+3.5
Conservative hold		Swing	−15.0	

General election 2010: Boston and Skegness
Party	Candidate	Votes	%	±%
Conservative	Mark Simmonds	21,325	49.4	+3.2
Labour	Paul Kenny	8,899	20.6	−11.1
Liberal Democrats	Philip Smith	6,371	14.8	+6.1
UKIP	Christopher Pain	4,081	9.5	−0.1
BNP	David Owens	2,278	5.3	+2.9
Independent	Peter Wilson	171	0.4	New
Majority		12,426	28.8	+14.7
Turnout		43,125	61.1	+2.2
Conservative hold		Swing	+7.0	

=== Elections in the 2000s ===
General election 2005: Boston and Skegness
Party	Candidate	Votes	%	±%
Conservative	Mark Simmonds	19,329	46.2	+3.3
Labour	Paul Kenny	13,422	32.1	−9.5
UKIP	Richard Horsnell	4,024	9.6	+7.8
Liberal Democrats	Alan Riley	3,649	8.7	−3.7
BNP	Wendy Russell	1,025	2.4	New
Green	Marcus Petz	420	1.0	−0.3
Majority		5,907	14.1	+12.8
Turnout		41,869	58.8	+0.4
Conservative hold		Swing	+6.4	

General election 2001: Boston and Skegness
Party	Candidate	Votes	%	±%
Conservative	Mark Simmonds	17,298	42.9	+0.5
Labour	Elaine Bird	16,783	41.6	+0.6
Liberal Democrats	Duncan Moffatt	4,994	12.4	−4.2
UKIP	Cyril Wakefield	717	1.8	New
Green	Mark Harrison	521	1.3	New
Majority		515	1.3	−0.1
Turnout		40,313	58.4	−10.5
Conservative hold		Swing	−0.1	

=== Elections in the 1990s ===
General election 1997: Boston and Skegness
Party	Candidate	Votes	%	±%
Conservative	Richard Body	19,750	42.4	−8.4
Labour	Philip McCauley	19,103	41.0	+12.8
Liberal Democrats	Jim Dodsworth	7,721	16.6	−4.4
Majority		647	1.4	
Turnout		46,574	68.9	
Conservative win (new seat)				

== Sources ==
- Morgan, Bryn (29 March 2001). General Election results, 1 May 1997 (PDF) (Report). House of Commons Library. Archived (PDF) from the original on 3 February 2020.
- Morgan, Bryn (18 June 2001). General Election results, 7 June 2001 (PDF) (Report). House of Commons Library. Archived (PDF) from the original on 3 February 2020.
- Mellows-Facer, Adam (10 March 2006). General Election 2005 (PDF) (Report). House of Commons Library. Archived (PDF) from the original on 26 January 2020.
- Rhodes, Christopher; Cracknell, Richard; McGuiness, Feargal (2 February 2011). General Election 2010 (PDF) (Report). House of Commons Library. Archived (PDF) from the original on 26 January 2020.
- Hawkins, Oliver; Keen, Richard; Nakatudde, Nambassa; Ayres, Steven; Baker, Carl; Harker, Rachael; Bolton, Paul; Johnston, Neil; Cracknell, Richard (28 July 2015). General Election 2015 (PDF) (Report). House of Commons Library. Archived (PDF) from the original on 26 January 2020.
- Baker, Carl; Hawkins, Oliver; Audickas, Lukas; Bate, Alex; Cracknell, Richard; Apostolova, Vyara; Dempsey, Noel; McInnes, Roderick; Rutherford, Tom; Uberoi, Elise (29 January 2019). General Election 2017: results and analysis (PDF) (Report). House of Commons Library. Archived (PDF) from the original on 26 January 2020.
- Uberoi, Elise; Baker, Carl; Cracknell, Richard (19 December 2019). General Election 2019: results and analysis (PDF) (Report). House of Commons Library. Archived (PDF) from the original on 26 January 2020.
- Fifth Periodical Report (PDF) (Report). Vol. 1: Report. Boundary Commission for England. 2007. Archived from the original (PDF) on 26 July 2011.
- The 2018 Review of Parliamentary Constituency Boundaries (PDF) (Report). Vol. one: Report. Boundary Commission for England. September 2018. Archived (PDF) from the original on 1 February 2020.
- Waller, Robert; Criddle, Byron (August 1999). The Almanac of British Politics (6th ed.). London: Routledge. ISBN 9780415185417.
- Waller, Robert; Criddle, Byron (August 2002). The Almanac of British Politics (7th ed.). London: Routledge. ISBN 9780415268349.
- Waller, Robert; Criddle, Byron (June 2007). The Almanac of British Politics (8th ed.). London: Routledge. ISBN 9780415378239.
- Dale, Iain (3 February 2015). Seat by Seat: The Political Anorak's Guide to Potential Gains and Losses in the 2015 General Election. London: Biteback Publishing. ISBN 9781849548823.
- Goodwin, Matthew; Milazzo, Caitlin (November 2015). UKIP: Inside the Campaign to Redraw the Map of British Politics. Oxford University Press. ISBN 9780198736110.
