= Richard Tice =

British businessman and politician (born 1964)

Richard Tice MP
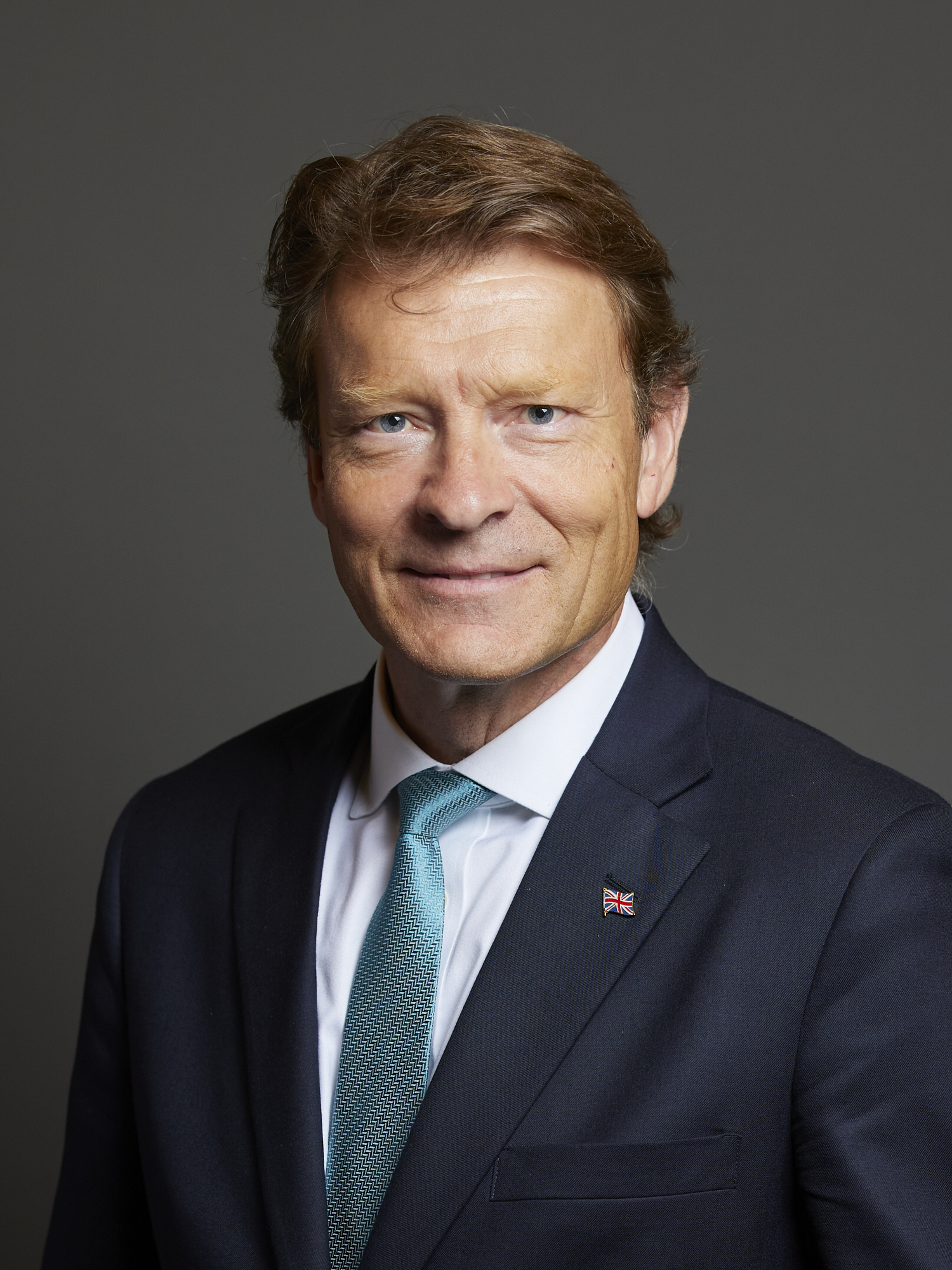
- Official portrait, 2024

Deputy Leader of Reform UK
- Incumbent
- Assumed office 11 July 2024
- Leader: Nigel Farage
- Preceded by: David Bull; Ben Habib

Reform UK Spokesperson for Business, Trade and Energy
- Incumbent
- Assumed office 17 February 2026
- Leader: Nigel Farage
- Preceded by: Rupert Lowe (Note: as Business and Agriculture spokesperson)

Member of Parliament for Boston and Skegness
- Incumbent
- Assumed office 4 July 2024
- Preceded by: Matt Warman
- Majority: 2,010 (5.0%)

Member of the European Parliament for East of England
- In office 2 July 2019 – 31 January 2020
- Preceded by: Patrick O'Flynn
- Succeeded by: Constituency abolished
Previous party positions 2019–2026
Leader of Reform UK in the House of Commons
In office 8 July 2026 – 14 August 2026
Party Leader	Nigel Farage
Preceded by	Nigel Farage (Note: as Party leader)
Succeeded by	Nigel Farage
Chairman of Reform UK (Note: Reform UK was previously called the Brexit Party from 2019 to 2021.)
In office 3 June 2024 – 11 July 2024
Leader	Nigel Farage
Preceded by	Himself (2021)
Succeeded by	Zia Yusuf
In office 12 April 2019 – 6 March 2021
Leader	Nigel Farage
Preceded by	Office established
Succeeded by	Himself (2024)
Leader of Reform UK
In office 6 March 2021 – 3 June 2024
Deputy	David Bull; Ben Habib
Preceded by	Nigel Farage
Succeeded by	Nigel Farage

Personal details
- Born: Richard James Sunley Tice; 13 September 1964 (age 62) Farnham, Surrey, England
- Party: Reform UK (since 2019)
- Other political affiliations: Conservative (until 2012; 2016–2019); Independent (2012–2016)
- Spouse(s): Emma (divorced) Isabel Oakeshott (m. 2026)
- Children: 3
- Relatives: Bernard Sunley (grandfather)
- Education: University of Salford (BSc)
- Occupation: CEO, Quidnet Capital; Co-founder and former co-chair of Leave Means Leave and former co-chair of Leave.EU
- Website: richardtice.com

Richard James Sunley Tice (born 13 September 1964) is a British businessman and politician who is a member of Parliament (MP) for Boston and Skegness. He has served as deputy leader of Reform UK since 2024 and as the party's Business, Trade and Energy spokesperson since February 2026.

Tice was the Chairman of Reform UK from 2019 to 2021 and again briefly in 2024. Since 2023, he has also been Reform UK's energy and foreign policy spokesman. He became the leader of Reform UK in March 2021, but stood down in June 2024 and was succeeded by Nigel Farage.

Tice was the chief executive officer (CEO) of the property group CLS Holdings from 2010 to 2014, after which he became CEO of the property asset management group Quidnet Capital LLP. He was a founder and co-chairman of the pro-Brexit campaign groups Leave.EU and Leave Means Leave. Tice had been a long-term donor and member of the Conservative Party until 2019, when he financed the founding of the Brexit Party, which was later renamed Reform UK. He was elected a member of the European Parliament (MEP) for East of England at the 2019 European Parliament (EP) election, holding this role until the UK's withdrawal from the European Union (EU) in January 2020.

== Early life ==
Richard James Sunley Tice was born on 13 September 1964 in Farnham, Surrey, son of the philanthropist Joan Mary Tice (née Sunley) who died in 2019. He is a maternal grandson of the property developer Bernard Sunley.

Tice, who grew up and first went to school in Northampton, was educated at the private Uppingham School. He subsequently received a bachelor's degree in construction economics and quantity surveying from the University of Salford. He attended the evangelical Christian Iwerne camps.

== Property career ==
After graduation in 1987, Tice's first occupation was at the housing developer London and Metropolitan. This included time at its Paris office, where he learnt French. In 1991 he started working for the housebuilding and commercial property company founded by his grandfather, The Sunley Group. Tice was its joint chief executive officer (CEO) for 14 years before leaving the company in 2006.

Tice then ran his own debt advisory consultancy before joining the property investment group CLS Holdings in 2010, leading major planning property applications in Vauxhall, London. He was its CEO until 2014. Tice left the company to become CEO of the property investment firm Quidnet Capital Partners LLP, having been removed from CLS' board due to a potential conflict of interest.

== Television presenter ==
Tice was a television presenter for TalkTV before moving to GB News in September 2023.

== Political career ==
=== Conservative Party ===
Before joining the Brexit Party, Tice was a donor and member of the Conservative Party for most of his adult life. Tice wrote a 2008 report for the think tank Reform called "Academies: A model education?". In 2017, he co-wrote a pamphlet for the think tank UK 2020, "Timebomb: how the university cartel is failing Britain's students", which included recommendations on how to expand two-year degrees. He produced a follow-up report on student finances called "Defusing the debt timebomb" which he sent to the then-Chancellor of the Exchequer, Philip Hammond.

In a May 2018 article on the website ConservativeHome, Tice argued for the importance of expanding the availability of homes for people on lower incomes and how this could be achieved more effectively. He felt that crime could also be reduced if housing was better managed.

=== Euroscepticism ===
Tice is a Eurosceptic. He was a director of the campaign group, Business for Sterling, which campaigned for the United Kingdom not to adopt the Euro in the late 1990s. Tice donated £1,750 to the Eurosceptic MP David Davis' candidacy in the 2001 Conservative Party leadership election.

In July 2015, Tice co-founded, with the businessman Arron Banks, the pro-Brexit Leave.EU campaign group. It was originally known as The Know.EU before being rebranded in September of that year. He also donated £38,000 to the pro-Brexit campaign group Grassroots Out. Shortly after the United Kingdom voted to leave the European Union in the 2016 referendum, he left Leave.EU, and co-founded the pressure group Leave Means Leave, co-chairing it with businessman John Longworth. In October 2017, they were placed jointly at Number 90 on Iain Dale's list of the "Top 100 Most Influential People on the Right".

Tice, Banks, Andy Wigmore and Nigel Farage were referred to by sections of the media as the "Bad Boys of Brexit", a group who facilitated it. Tice wrote a number of articles advocating a no-deal Brexit, and was the first to use the phrase, "no deal is better than a bad deal" in relation to Brexit in July 2016, which was later used by then-Prime Minister Theresa May in her Lancaster House speech outlining the government's approach to negotiations in January 2017.

=== Brexit Party and Reform UK ===
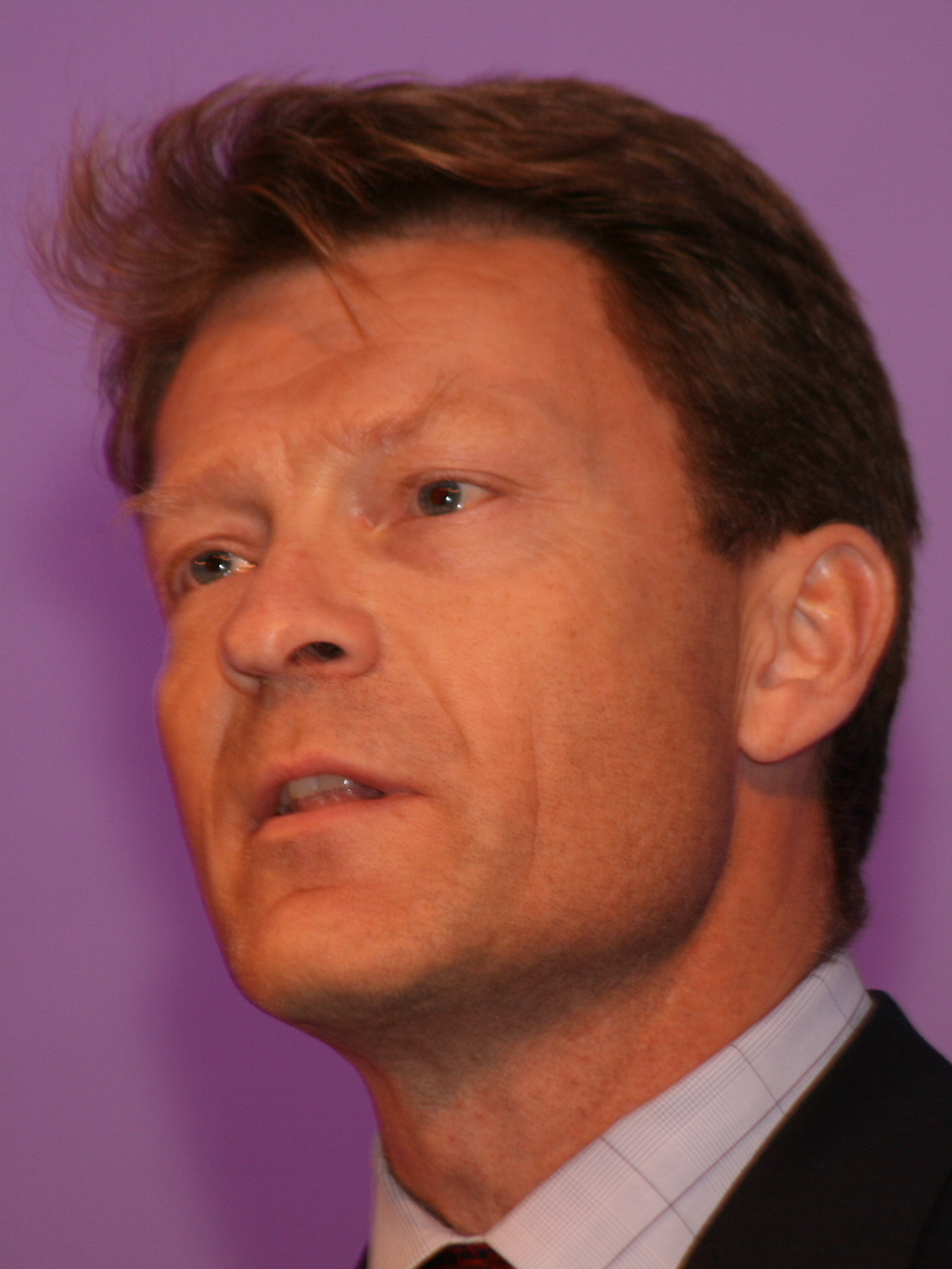
Tice in 2015

In his role as the chairman of the Brexit Party he regularly represented it with appearances in the media, including inclusion on the panel of BBC Radio 4's Any Questions?. He was the chairman when the party participated in the 2019 European Parliament election, under Nigel Farage's leadership. In that election, it won 29 seats in the European Parliament, having existed for only six months.

Tice stood as a candidate at the 2019 European Parliament election. He was first on his party's list in the East of England constituency, and was elected as one of its three MEPs for that region. In the European Parliament, he was a member of the Committee on Economic and Monetary Affairs, and was part of the delegation for relations with Canada.

In November 2019, it was announced that Tice would be standing as the Brexit Party candidate for the Hartlepool constituency at the 2019 general election. He finished in third place, with 25.8% of the vote.

On 30 October 2020, Farage applied to the Electoral Commission to change the Brexit Party's name to Reform UK. On 6 March 2021, it was announced that Tice would become Leader of Reform UK following Farage's resignation.

In March 2021, Tice announced he would be the Reform UK candidate for the Havering and Redbridge constituency in the 2021 London Assembly election. He came second-to-last with 5,143 votes. Tice was also the lead Reform UK candidate on the additional members list, though the party finished tenth with 1% of all votes cast. Reform UK under Tice's leadership gained only two councillors in the 2021 local elections.

In December 2021, Tice stood in the by-election for the Old Bexley and Sidcup constituency following the death of the sitting MP, James Brokenshire. He received 1,432 votes, a 6.6% vote share.

In June 2024, Tice stood down as leader and was replaced by Farage, after his return to frontline politics. Tice stood in Boston and Skegness at the 2024 general election and was elected to Parliament after defeating the incumbent Conservative, Matt Warman. In addition to Tice, four other Reform UK candidates were elected to parliament; Farage, Lee Anderson, Rupert Lowe and James McMurdock. In January 2025, Tice voted along with all other Reform UK MPs for a new national inquiry into rape gangs. Reform UK was the only party to vote in unison. The bill was lost at 364 votes to 111, a majority of 253, against the amendment.

On 17 February 2026, Tice was appointed to the Nigel Farage's frontbench team as spokesperson for Business, Trade, and Energy Policy.

On the 23 February 2026, Tice announced that a Reform government would end defined benefit pension schemes for new local government workers and merge existing schemes into a proposed £500bn British Sovereign Wealth Fund. He said the plan would increase investment in UK industries and be accompanied by changes to environmental policy and employment rights. Trade unions and representatives of the Labour and Conservative parties, criticised the proposals and raised concerns about workers’ benefits and broader economic impacts.

=== Energy and climate change ===
In July 2025, Tice, alongside Reform UK Mayor of Greater Lincolnshire, Andrea Jenkyns and Reform UK councillor Sean Matthews, who leads Lincolnshire County Council, launched a campaign opposing wind farms, solar farms and battery storage facilities, with Tice saying the campaign would use "every lever available" to stop these developments.

In November 2025, when asked by Sky News if humans have impacted the climate, Tice said: "Possibly, but if so, a very modest percentage." He accepted the need to update infrastructure in Britain to cope with a changing climate. When asked whether he accepted that the climate was warming at an unprecedented rate, Tice said: "From the data that I've seen, from previous ice core data, I think the answer to that is questionable." NASA has stated "human activity is the principal cause" of unprecedentedly fast warming and 234 UN scientists from the Intergovernmental Panel on Climate Change have said it is "unequivocal" that humans have caused "widespread and rapid changes".

In September 2026, Tice called for more North Sea drilling, saying that every last drop of oil and gas should be extracted from the North Sea.

=== International politics ===
In 2022, Tice co-authored with Sam Ashworth-Hayes a paper for the Henry Jackson Society which argued that international sanctions failed to deter Russia from invading Ukraine and that this should be a lesson for the West's approach to China on the issue of Taiwan. They wrote that "sanctions against China should be planned in advance, and clear warning given to relevant private sector actors and sectors that they will be expected to cease business with China in the event of a conflict with Taiwan".

When referring to the U.S. Republican Party politician, Ron DeSantis in late April 2023, Tice described him as "a courageous, bold leader and that's very interesting" and someone who "doesn't muck about — he just gets stuff done and tells it as it is" and said that he was trying to establish links with DeSantis.

During Prime Minister's Question Time in February 2025, Tice argued that British tax money should not be used to fund UNRWA and stated that the organisation is "riddled with Hamas sympathisers" citing evidence given by British-Israeli hostage Emily Damari who had been held captive by Hamas. In May 2025, Tice gave a keynote speech at an event in Hampstead organised by the National Jewish Assembly in which he said the "scariest and hardest" thing to do in the House of Commons was to speak up for Israel and the Jewish community. In October 2025 he described the Gaza Strip famine as "a blatant lie", saying he had witnessed "great convoys of lorries...loaded up with vital aid" entering Gaza during a visit to the border.

Tice strongly criticised Starmer's handling of the scandal surrounding Peter Mandelson's relationship with sex offender Jeffrey Epstein, accusing him of a "woefully incompetent judgment" and of "misleading" Parliament. He and Reform UK have also raised questions about the vetting process for Starmer's appointment of Mandelson as British Ambassador to the United States. Tice stated that Starmer humiliated the country by appointing Mandelson despite public knowledge of his links to Epstein. Tice said Starmer misled the House of Commons by first expressing confidence in Mandelson on 10 September 2025 then dismissing him a day later. He also questioned how Starmer could credibly maintain his confidence in Mandelson with the emerging evidence. Tice and Reform UK have challenged the vetting process, stating that Starmer was wrong to claim that "full due process" had been followed. This came after it was revealed that Mandelson was not subjected to in-depth security vetting until after his appointment was announced.

Tice supported Israel and the USA from the outset of the 2026 Iran War. He said that if Reform was in government, "we would be helping the Americans and the Israelis in any way they saw appropriate". Tice said that the conflict would cause a "short-term bump" but the medium and long-term opportunities were "potentially very good for everybody".

== Financial affairs and allegations ==
In March 2026, The Sunday Times reported Tice had "avoided nearly £600,000 in corporation tax" through his property company. In response, Anna Turley MP, the Chair of the Labour Party, requested that HM Revenue and Customs (HMRC) investigate Tice's tax affairs. Turley described the article as presenting a "deeply troubling case which needs to be investigated with the utmost urgency". In response, Tice stated that his company operated within UK law and emphasised that there is no legal obligation to pay more tax than required.

In April 2026, The Sunday Times reported that a property company founded and owned by Tice failed to pay approximately £91,000 in tax prior to distributing dividends to Tice and his offshore trust registered in Jersey. Tice described the issue as a “technicality” and stated that the correct amount of tax had ultimately been paid. Zia Yusuf, Reform UK's home affairs spokesperson, described the issue as "a minor administrative error".

In July 2026, the Liberal Democrat MP, Lisa Smart, referred Tice to the parliamentary standards commissioner. Her allegation was that, by failing to declare an £80,000 loan he had received in 2024, Tice may have breached the MPs' code of conduct. On 30 July, the commissioner rejected the referral, saying there was insufficient evidence in the complaint to justify an investigation.

In August 2026, it was reported that Tice is under further investigation by parliamentary standards for a potential failure to declare an interest.

== Election results ==
East of England: popular vote winners by district, 2019

2019 European election: East of England
List	Candidates	Votes	Of total (%)	± from prev.
Brexit Party	Richard Tice (1) Michael Heaver (3) June Mummery (5) Paul Hearn, Priscilla Huby, Sean Lever, Edmund Fordham	604,715 (201,391.67)	37.83	New
Liberal Democrats	Barbara Gibson (2) Lucy Nethsingha (6) Fionna Tod, Stephen Robinson, Sandy Walkington, Marie Goldman, Jules Ewart	361,563 (180,751.5)	22.62	+15.72
Green	Catherine Rowett (4) Rupert Read, Martin Schmierer, Fiona Radic, Paul Jeater, Pallavi Devulapalli, Jeremy Caddick	202,460	12.67	+4.17
Conservative	Geoffrey Van Orden (7) John Flack, Joe Rich, Thomas McLaren, Joel Charles, Wazz Mughal, Thomas Smith	163,830	10.25	–18.15
Labour	Alex Mayer, Chris Vince, Sharon Taylor, Alvin Shum, Anna Smith, Adam Scott, Javeria Hussain	139,490	8.73	–8.57
Change UK	Emma Taylor, Neil Carmichael, Bhavna Joshi, Michelle de Vries, Amanda Gummer, Thomas Graham, Roger Casale	58,274	3.65	New
UKIP	Stuart Agnew, Paul Oakley, Elizabeth Jones, William Ashpole, Alan Graves, John Wallace, John Whitby	54,676	3.42	–31.08
English Democrat	Robin Tilbrook, Charles Vickers, Bridget Vickers, Paul Wiffen	10,217	0.64	–1.09
Independent	Attila Csordas	3,230	0.20	New
Rejected ballots		9,589		
Turnout		1,603,017	36.37	+0.5

2024 general election: Boston and Skegness
Party	Candidate	Votes	%	±%
Reform	Richard Tice	15,520	38.4	N/A
Conservative	Matt Warman	13,510	33.4	−43.0
Labour	Alex Fawbert	7,629	18.9	+3.3
Green	Christopher Moore	1,506	3.7	N/A
Liberal Democrats	Richard Lloyd	1,375	3.4	−1.4
English Democrat	David Dickason	518	1.3	N/A
Blue Revolution	Mike Gilbert	397	1.0	N/A
Majority		2,010	5.0	N/A
Turnout		40,455	53.4	−6.0
Registered electors		75,811		
Reform gain from Conservative		Swing		

2019 general election: Hartlepool
Party	Candidate	Votes	%	±%
Labour	Mike Hill	15,464	37.7	–14.8
Conservative	Stefan Houghton	11,869	28.9	–5.3
Brexit Party	Richard Tice	10,603	25.8	N/A
Liberal Democrats	Andy Hagon	1,696	4.1	+2.3
Independent	Joe Bousfield	911	2.2	N/A
Socialist Labour	Kevin Cranney	494	1.2	N/A
Majority		3,595	8.8	–9.5
Turnout		41,037	57.9	–1.3
Labour hold		Swing	–4.8	

2021 London Assembly election: Havering and Redbridge
Party	Candidate	Votes	%	±%
Conservative	Keith Prince	77,268	46.0	+8.3
Labour	Judith Garfield	61,941	36.9	0.0
Green	Melanie Collins	13,685	8.1	+2.5
Liberal Democrats	Thomas Clarke	8,150	4.8	+0.7
Reform	Richard Tice	5,143	3.1	New
TUSC	Andy Walker	1,856	1.1	New
Majority		15,327	9.1	+8.3
Total formal votes		168,043		
Informal votes		2,741		
Turnout		170,784		
Conservative hold		Swing		

2021 Old Bexley and Sidcup by-election
Party	Candidate	Votes	%	±%
Conservative	Louie French	11,189	51.5	–13.0
Labour	Daniel Francis	6,711	30.9	+7.4
Reform	Richard Tice	1,432	6.6	N/A
Green	Jonathan Rooks	830	3.8	+0.6
Liberal Democrats	Simone Reynolds	647	3.0	–5.3
English Democrat	Elaine Cheeseman	271	1.3	N/A
UKIP	John Poynton	184	0.8	N/A
Rejoin EU	Richard Hewison	151	0.7	N/A
Heritage	David Kurten	116	0.5	N/A
CPA	Carol Valinejad	108	0.5	±0.0
Monster Raving Loony	Mad Mike Young	94	0.4	N/A
Majority		4,478	20.6	–20.4
Turnout		21,733	33.5	–36.3
Rejected ballots		50	0.2	
Total ballots		21,783	33.6	
Registered electors		64,831		
Conservative hold		Swing	–10.2	

== Personal life ==
Tice is divorced after a 24-year marriage to Emma, with whom he has three children.

He began an extramarital affair with the right-wing political journalist Isabel Oakeshott in 2018, and separated from his wife in March 2019. They announced their engagement in 2025. In January 2025, Tice was said to be splitting his time between the House of Commons and his constituency in Skegness as well as spending time in Dubai, where Oakeshott moved with her children. In October 2026, the couple were married.

Tice grew up and first went to school in Northampton, and is a supporter of Northampton Saints rugby club. Tice was a member of the governing body of Northampton Academy between 2005 and 2019 and has also been vice chair of trustees at Uppingham School.

A long-time contributor to the magazine Property Week, Tice is a regular commentator on developments within the property world. Tice has identified as a Christian and said he "enjoys the church [and] believes in God".

In October 2019, openDemocracy revealed that two offshore companies in tax havens had owned shares in Tice's family business, Sunley Family Limited, since 1994.

== Notes ==
Party political offices
Vacant Title last held by himself (in 2021)	Chairman of Reform UK; 2024	Succeeded by Zia Yusuf
Preceded by Ben Habib as co-deputy leader	Deputy leader of Reform UK; 2024 – present	Incumbent
Preceded by David Bull as co-deputy leader	Deputy leader of Reform UK; 2024 – present	Incumbent
Parliament of the United Kingdom
Preceded by Matt Warman	Member of parliament for Boston and Skegness; 2024–present	Incumbent
