= Brighton Centre =

Conference and exhibition centre

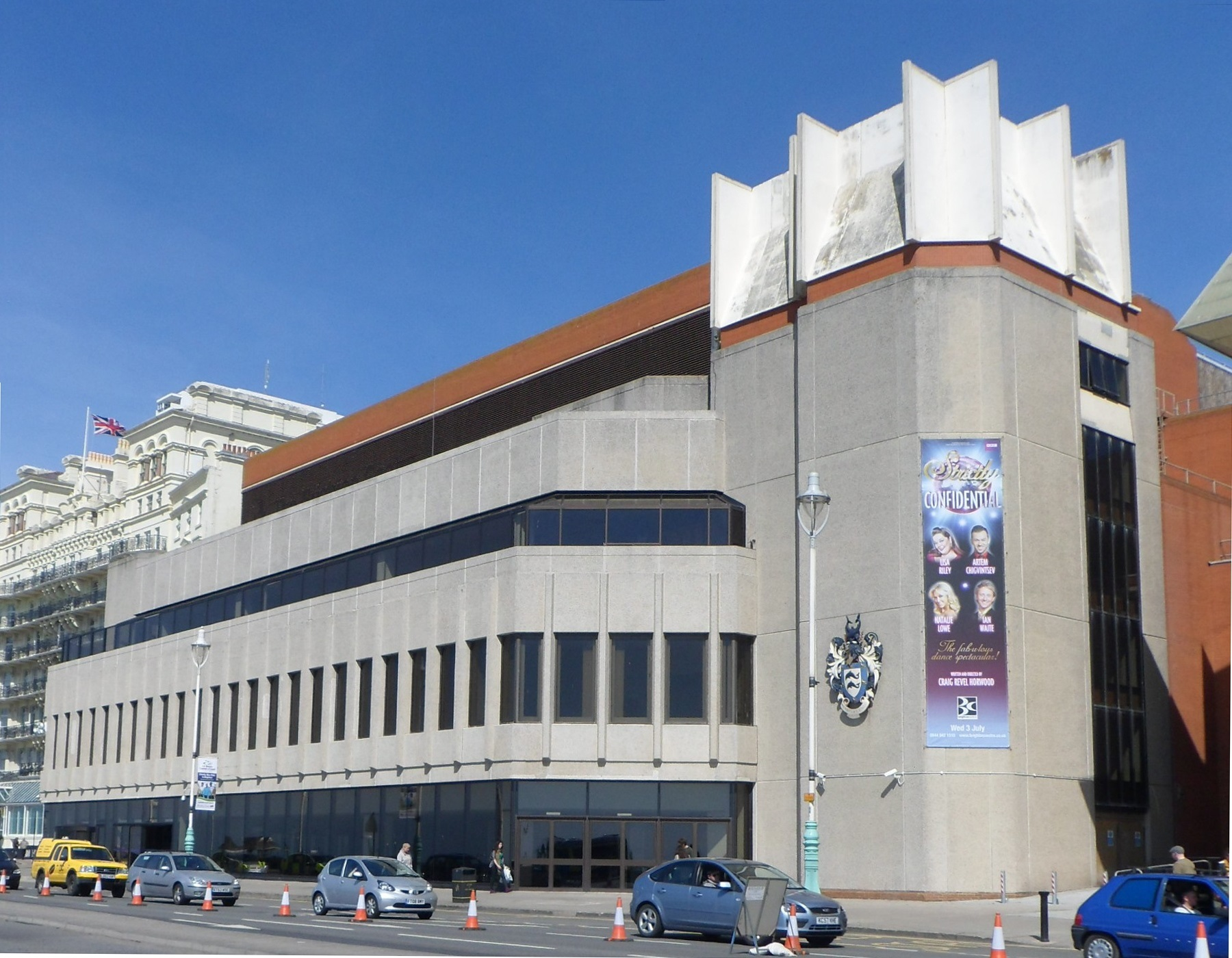
- The Brighton Centre in April 2013
- Interactive map of Brighton Centre
- Address: Kings Rd, Brighton. BN1 2GR
- Location: Brighton, East Sussex, England
- Coordinates: 50°49′16″N 0°08′46″W
- Owner: Brighton & Hove City Council
- Operator: Brighton & Hove City Council
- Capacity: 4,270 (seated), 5,532 (standing)

Construction
- Opened: 19 September 1977
- Renovated: January 2012
- Architect: Russell Diplock & Associates

Website
- www.brightoncentre.co.uk

Brighton Centre is a conference and exhibition centre located in Brighton, England. It is the largest of its kind in southern England, and is regularly used for conferences of the UK political parties and other bodies of national importance. The venue has the capacity to accommodate up to 5,000 delegates, although rooms in the building can be used for weddings and banquets.

It has also been used as a live music venue since it was opened by James Callaghan on 19 September 1977. It was designed in a Brutalist style by architects Russell Diplock & Associates, who made extensive use of textured concrete. The venue is situated in the centre of Brighton on the sea front and is within 200 metres of major hotels. In 2004, it was estimated that the centre generated £50 million in revenue for Brighton.

== History ==
Bing Crosby's final performance was at Brighton Centre on 10 October 1977. He died of a heart attack four days later, while at a golf tournament in Spain.

The Jacksons performed on 10 February 1979 as part of their Destiny World Tour.

The Who performed on 10 and 11 November 1979 as part of their Who Are You Tour, and returned as part of their Face Dances Tour in 1981, and in 2006 as part of their Endless Wire Tour.

Queen performed on 10 and 11 December 1979 as part of their Crazy Tour.

Bob Marley and The Wailers performed on 8 and 9 July 1980 as part of their Uprising Tour.

Between 1978 and 1995 it was the venue for the Brighton International tennis tournament, an annual event on the WTA Tour. Champions of the event included Chris Evert, Martina Navratilova and Steffi Graf.

From 29 to 30 November 1983, pop duo Wham! performed their final dates on their debut UK tour, titled Club Fantastic Tour.

On 11 December 1982, The Jam played their last gig in the Conference Room at Brighton Centre.

From 9–15 September 1989, the Liberal Democrats held their first Liberal Democrat Conference at Brighton Centre, after the party's formation in the previous year.

In 1991 and 1992, the World Wrestling Federation (WWF) came to the venue as part of their 'World' and 'European Rampage Again' Tours. The promotion would return to the venue (as WWE) numerous times in the 2010s.

In 2003 and 2004, Brighton Centre hosted the 2003 and 2004 British Open snooker, from 8–16 November.

On 17 December 2006 comedy rock duo Tenacious D performed as part of their Pick of Destiny Tour, Neil Hamburger was the opening act. On 13 May 2024 they returned as part of their Spicy Meatball Tour opened by Dave Hill.

== Renovations ==
In March 2003, there were proposals to demolish the centre at the end of 2005, and replace it with a new exhibition and conference centre by 2008. The centre was given a £1 million renovation in 2012. In November 2014, demolition proposals were made again, but these were to demolish the centre to extend the Churchill Square shopping centre, and then build a new 10,000 capacity exhibition and conference centre on derelict land near the Brighton Marina. In November 2019, these plans were revisited.

== See also ==
- List of Brutalist structures
