= Lekoil =

Lekoil Nigeria Limited
- Company type: Private
- Industry: Oil and Gas
- Founded: 2010
- Founder: Olalekan ("Lekan") Akinyanmi
- Headquarters: Cayman Islands, London and Lagos
- Number of locations: United Kingdom, Nigeria
- Area served: Africa
- Key people: Shareholders and Board
- Products: Crude Oil; Natural Gas
- Services: Shareholding in oil exploration and production companies with interests in Africa.
- Subsidiaries: LEKOIL Oil and Gas Investments Limited
- Website: www.lekoil.com

LEKOIL is a Cayman incorporated company, which is focused through its shareholding in Lekoil Nigeria on African oil exploration and production, with interests in Nigeria and offshore Namibia. The company was founded in 2010 by a former analyst from Alliance Bernstein and listed on the Alternative Investment Market of the London Stock Exchange in 2013.

Their Mission, Vision & Values can be found on their website, https://lekoil.com

== History ==
LEKOIL was founded in 2010 by Olalekan ("Lekan") Akinyanmi, a native Nigerian and former analyst for Alliance Bernstein, and a group of professionals from the finance and oil industry.

LEKOIL initially struggled to secure any of the Nigerian opportunities available from the Shell and ConocoPhillips divestment programmes. It subsequently secure the Namibian offshore Blocks 2514 A and B located in the prospective Luderitz Basin although not considered one of the major prospective zones on the continent., and a farm out agreement with a subsidiary of Afren PLC on OPL310, an offshore Nigerian asset located in the Dahomey-Benin Basin.

In May 2013, on the basis of these assets LEKOIL listed on the Alternative Investment Market of the London Stock Exchange raising net proceeds of approximately £27 million with a market capitalisation of £73m at the placing price. Strand Hanson Limited acted as the Nominated Advisor with Mirabaud Securities acting as Broker and Revere Securities Corp. as US Placing Agent. It was the largest fund raise on AIM at that point in 2013.

At the time of listing, LEKOil's indirect interest in the OPL310 asset equated to approximately a 27 percent economic interest and a 15.43 percent participating interest.

Following initial success, the Company raised a further US$20m and $100m in July and November 2013 respectively to fund drilling and testing of the Ogo-ST well on the OPL310 licence.

In May 2014, LEKOIL acquired a 40% interest in the Otakikpo Marginal Field on the onshore Nigerian OML11 licence from Green Energy International and raise £22m to fund its development. In September 2015 the company reported first oil from production tests at Otakikpo and continuous commercial production in 2017. In late 2018, the company announced that a further drilling programme was planned to increase production to 15,000-20,000 bopd.

In 2015, LEKOIL raised US$46 million in equity to fund the acquisition of a 62% economic interest in the Nigerian licence OPL325. There has been scepticism about the potential for sufficiently large finds in this part of the Dahomey-Benin Basin. In January 2018, following publication of a technical evaluation report LEKOIL announced it intended to farm-down part of the licence.

In 2019 it was reported that LEKOIL were considering a secondary listing on the Nigerian Stock Exchange with a possible date in 2022.

On 2 January 2020 the company announced that it had secured a loan facility from the Qatar Investment Authority (QIA), the sovereign wealth fund of the State of Qatar for US$184.0 million to fund the appraisal drilling and initial development programme on the Ogo field within its OPL 310 licence. Following queries from the QIA, the company announced that it had been the victim of a fraud with the loss of US$600,000 in advance fee payments and legal costs resulting in the collapse of the company's share price. LEKOIL had already been facing legal and funding challenges in relation to the OPL 310 licence. It was reported at the time that following the fraud the company had only US$2.7m in cash remaining and there were questions over the future of the Company and the Ogo project.

== Controversy ==
On 13 January 2020, LEKOIL announced that it had been the victim of a fraud over a fake US$184.0 million loan facility that it had announced eleven days earlier. According to LEKOIL, the deal “seems to have been entered into by the company with individuals who have constructed a complex facade in order to masquerade as representatives of the QIA”.

LEKOIL said it paid US$600,000 to Seawave Invest Limited as “introducer to those purporting to be the QIA and lead adviser to the company in relation to the facility agreement”.

In the short period between the funding announcement and the disclosure of the fraud, several management changes occurred. Greg Eckersley, a board member, who previously worked at the Abu Dhabi sovereign wealth fund overseeing due diligence, who had been acting as the Interim CFO left the firm. LEKOIL also appointed two new Non-Executive Directors, Tony Hawkins, a well-known oil lawyer and The Rt. Hon. Mark Simmonds, a former UK Government minister who was Foreign & Commonwealth Office Minister with responsibility for Africa.

It was also disclosed that as part of the transaction, Lekan Akinyanmi, LEKOIL's founder and CEO, would have a US$1.7m company loan written off and receive a new bonus plan.

Media comment questioned how the company and its professional advisers who included Strand Hanson, Mirabaud Securities and Numis could be taken in by the fraud. It was noted that Seawave Invest's website raised many red flags including numerous spelling mistakes, no named people and appeared to have large areas copied. The Times reported that Seawave, which was meant to be based in The Bahamas and Accra, Ghana had closed in February 2019. LEKOIL defended itself by claiming that it had commissioned a third-party due diligence report on Seawave prior to the deal.
