= Arlington House, Margate =

High-rise building in Kent, England

Arlington House
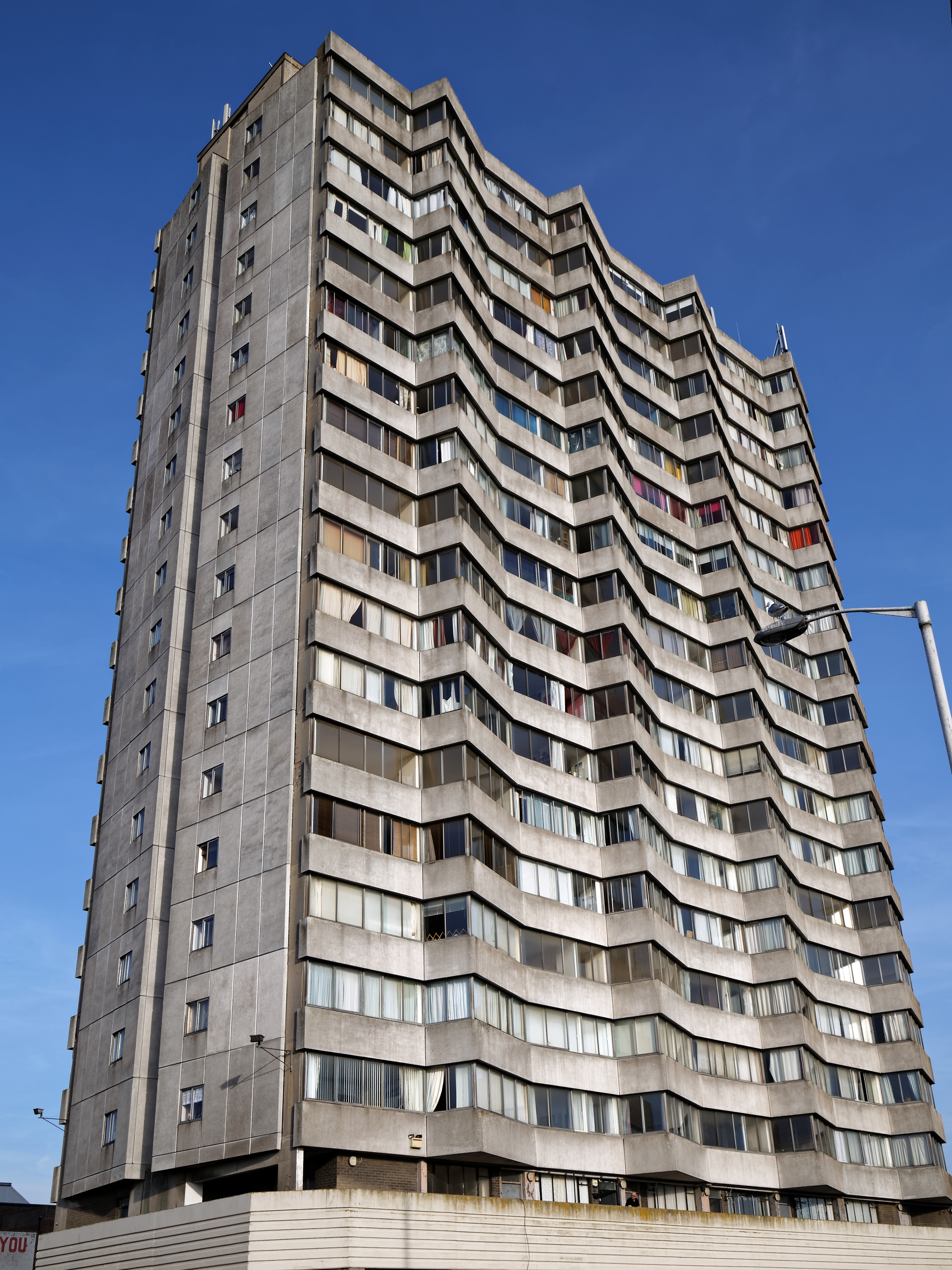
- Arlington House in 2016
- Interactive map of the Arlington House area

General information
- Type: Residential apartments; Commercial space
- Architectural style: Brutalist architecture
- Location: All Saints Avenue, Margate, Kent, England
- Coordinates: 51°23′10″N 01°22′29″E
- Completed: 1963
- Owner: Thanet District Council

Technical details
- Floor count: 18

Design and construction
- Architect: Russell Diplock & Associates
- Main contractor: Bernard Sunley & Sons

Other information
- Public transit access: Margate railway station

Website
- http://arlingtonhousemargate.co.uk/

Arlington House is an 18-storey residential apartment and commercial block in the Brutalist style on the seafront of Margate, Kent, England, next to Margate railway station and Dreamland Margate. It was developed by Bernard Sunley and designed by Russel Diplock, and is known for every apartment having a sea view.

The block developed from a site that was once part of the Margate Sands railway station and was advertised as a "park and buy" shopping centre. It struggled to become popular through the 1960s and 70s, with several apartments vacant and unlet. A fire broke out in 2001, leading to further complaints about lack of fire safety. Though the residential part of the block is now popular, it is still considered a controversial part of Margate architecture. The commercial section is vacant; a proposal to redevelop it into a Tesco store was unsuccessful.

== Location and architecture ==
The block is on part of the site of the former Margate Sands railway station, adjacent to Dreamland Margate and the current Margate railway station.

The building is designed in the Brutalist style and has 142 apartments spanning 18 storeys. It was designed by Russell Diplock & Associates, developed by Bernard Sunley Trust, and built by the contractors Bernard Sunley & Sons. The sides of the building have a wave-like design, providing both inland and sea views from all apartments.

Arlington House is the tallest structure in Margate. It dominates the local skyline, which some residents consider controversial.

== History ==
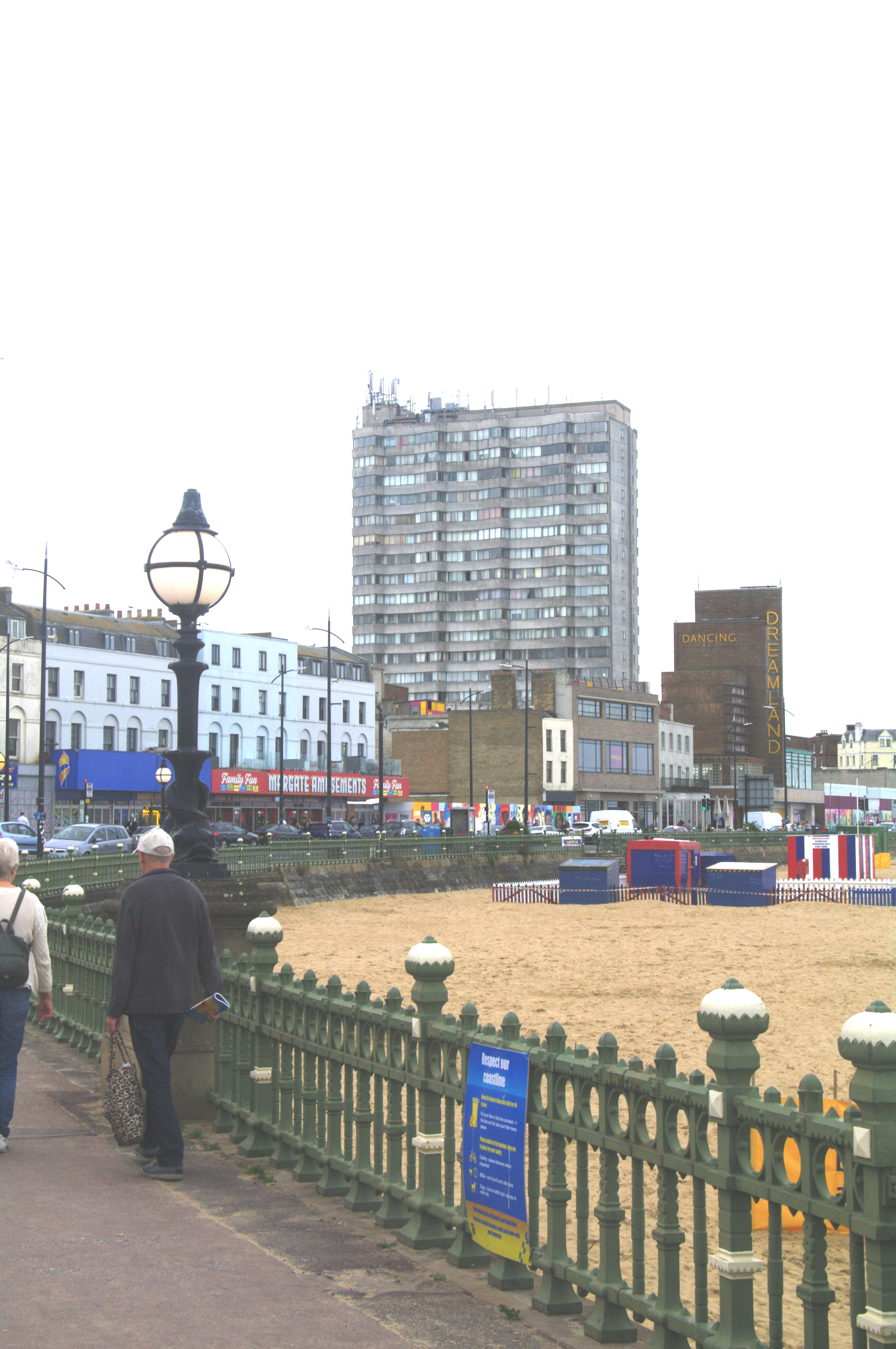
View from the seafront

After Margate Sands station closed in 1926, the site was bought by the Margate Corporation who built the Casino dance hall. Following a fire in 1946, it was demolished and turned into a car park. The Corporation sold the land to the developer Bernard Sunley in March 1961. Sunley was terminally ill at this point (and died three years later) but proposed a shopping arcade with a multi-level car park. The upper residential part of the block was constructed on-site with shuttering moved into position by a single crane at the top. The lifts were furnished in Carrara marble.

The block opened in December 1963. It was initially advertised as "Britain's first 'park and buy' shopping centre with luxury flats", incorporating a theatre, restaurant and rooftop swimming pool. However, the clash between mods and rockers on Margate seafront in spring 1964 reduced the attractiveness of Arlington; by July only one resident was living there. The council attempted to promote Arlington House as a positive reason to live in Margate.

The commercial part of the site on which Arlington House sits was slow to develop into shops. In 1969, the lease was bought by Metropolitan Property Realizations Limited - part of the Freshwater Group. The full centre was opened the following August, with actress Wendy Craig appearing at the opening ceremony. Despite this, several flats remained unoccupied and the building continued to be unpopular.

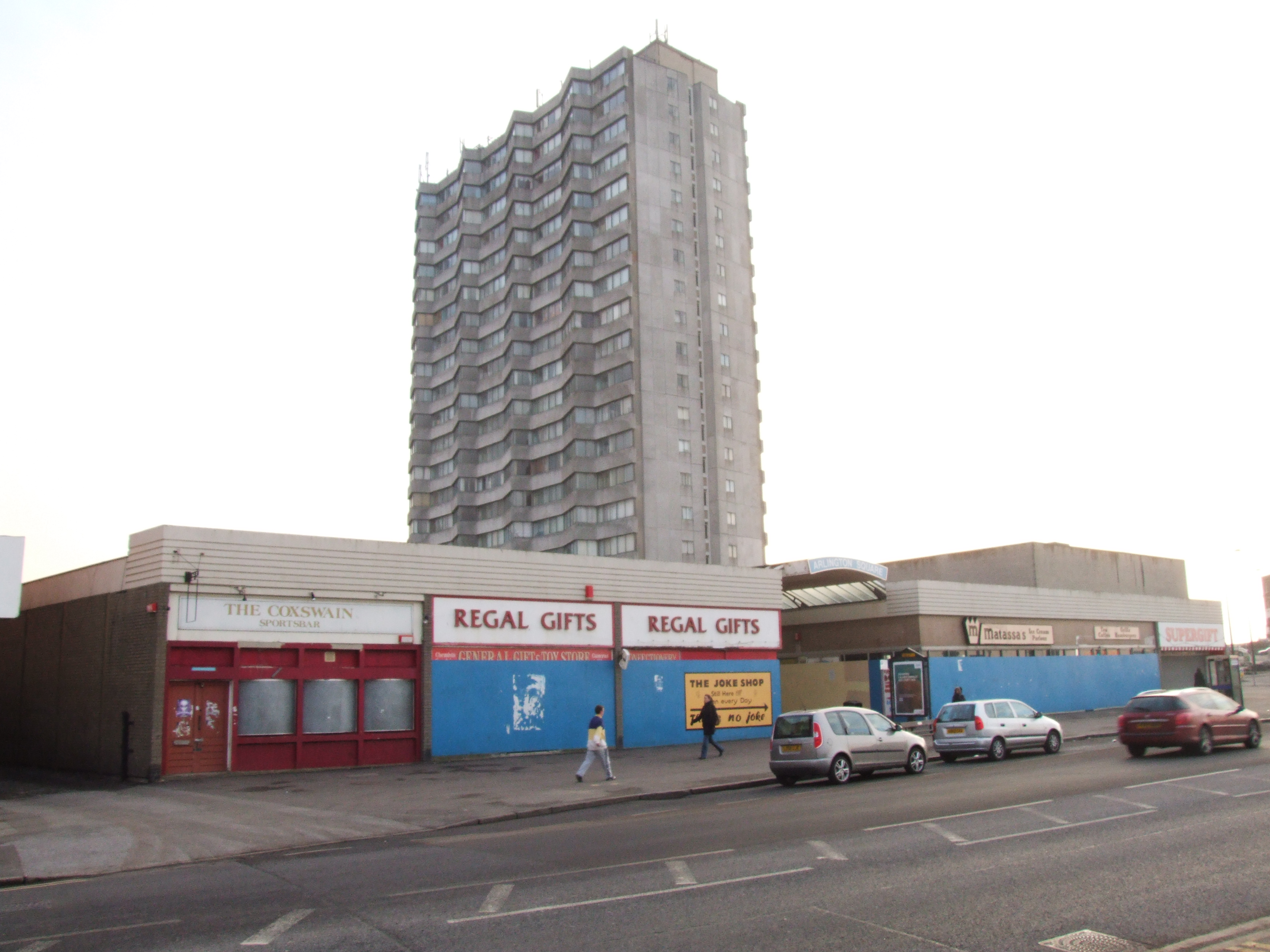
Derelict shops around Arlington House

In 2001, a major fire broke out at Arlington House, killing one resident. A further 13 were hospitalised, and 10 people required rescuing after the fire spread within the building. The fire was exacerbated by wind blowing in from broken windows, compromising the compartmentation within the structure. Following the fire, the gas supply was removed from all apartments.

In 2011, Thanet District Council proposed redeveloping the shopping arcade and car park as a Tesco store. Local residents opposed the redevelopment, some calling Arlington House an "eyesore". These plans were subsequently abandoned after Tesco changed its retail strategy. As of 2022, the car park is open, but the adjacent commercial units are vacant and boarded up.

In 2019, the Metropolitan Property Realizations (MPR), who own the building on a long-term lease from Thanet Council, cancelled the management contract of Trinity Estates after numerous complaints over excessive maintenance fees. Kent Fire and Rescue Service also served notice on Trinity Estates for failing to meet appropriate fire regulations. The safety of the building was questioned after a resident fell to his death while leaning on a window ledge smoking a cigarette. MPR subsequently took over management of the site directly but then engaged Parsons, Son and Basley . Despite criticism of Trinity Estates, a local councillor stressed it was unlikely that a fire similar to Grenfell Tower would occur at Arlington House as the building does not have the cladding that caused Grenfell's fire, and has two fire escapes.

In 2021, the lift mechanism failed, forcing all residents to use the stairs. This particularly affected the elderly and disabled, who were basically trapped in their homes. It was repaired just under a week later. The lifts failed again in 2023 following repeated problems; one of the lifts had been turned off for some time prior to the second failing. Two residents were moved to temporary accommodation while there were no working lifts.

Despite the controversy of a high-rise apartment building close to Margate's seafront, it is now considered a popular place to live because of spacious flats and good views. As of 2022, properties for flats have reached prices around £150,000. However, the retail premises and car park surrounding the block continue to be close to derelict.

In 2024 the building's leaseholders, Freshwater Group of Companies, proposed to renovate and change the windows. Many residents and others objected, saying that it would be a visual disimprovement; others favoured the change, which would allow energy-saving double glazing and reduce rattling. Artist Tracey Emin, who owned a flat in the building, was among objectors.

== Residents ==
The poet and vocalist for Hawkwind, Robert Calvert lived at Arlington House; the song "High Rise" on the band's 1979 album PXR5 was reportedly inspired by the building. The artist Tracey Emin owns a flat there as of 2024.

== Cultural references ==
An apartment in Arlington House features as the flat of the two members of the band of Icona Pop in their video clip for their hit song Fall in Love. The building also featured in Sam Mendes' film Empire of Light, which was shot in Margate.

== See also ==
- Tower blocks in Great Britain
