= Bernard Sunley =

British property developer (1910–1964)

- Born: 4 November 1910; Catford, England
- Died: 20 November 1964 (aged 54); Hampstead, London, England
- Occupation: Property developer
- Known for: Founder, Bernard Sunley & Sons
- Children: 3
- Relatives: Richard Tice (grandson)

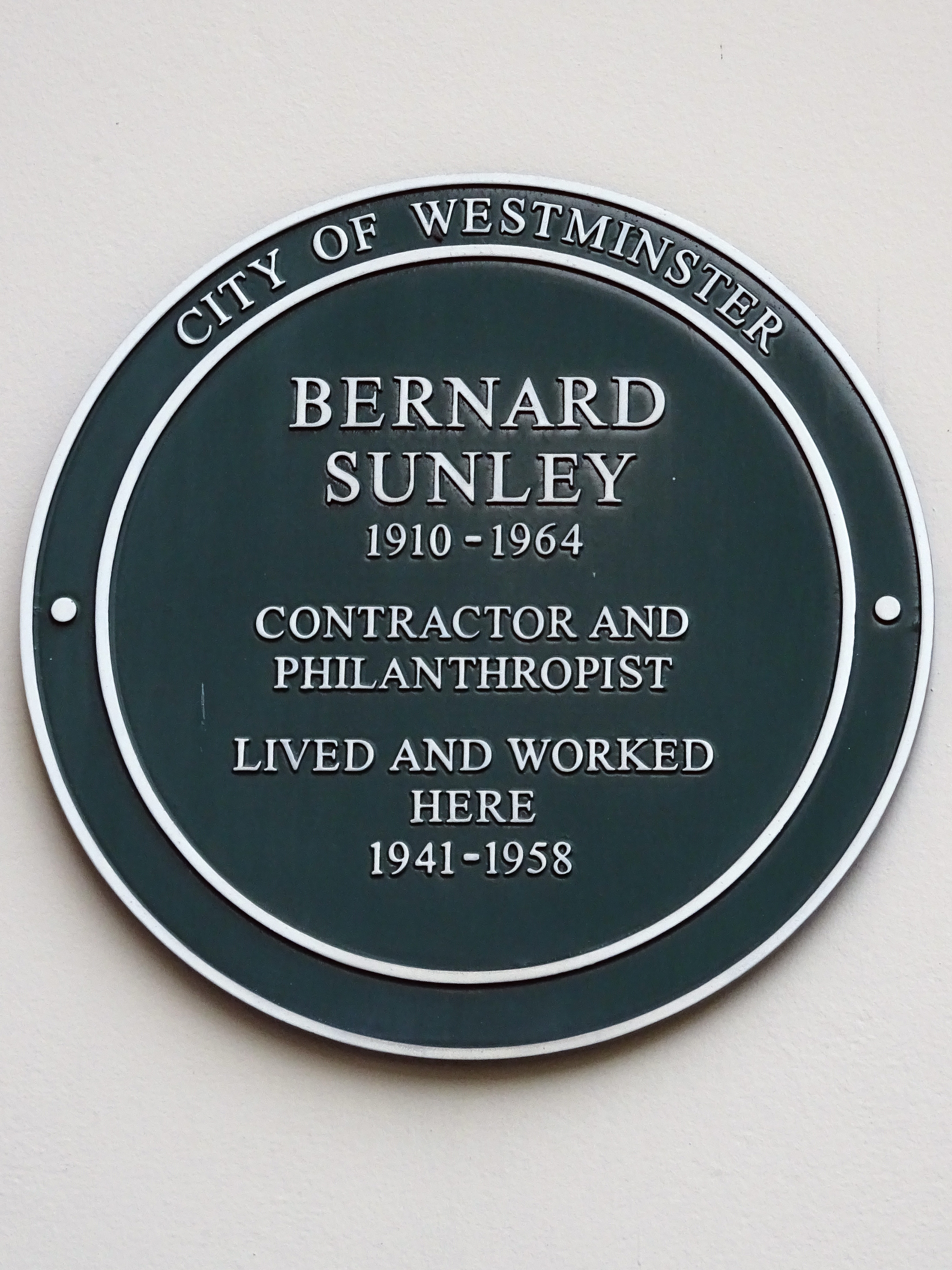
Bernard Sunley 1910–1964 Contractor and philanthropist lived and worked here 1941–1958 – green plaque erected by City of Westminster at 24 Berkeley Square London W1J 6EJ

Bernard Sunley (4 November 1910 – 20 November 1964) was a British property developer. He was the founder of Bernard Sunley & Sons.

== Biography ==
Sunley was born on 4 November 1910, in Catford. He was the son of John Sunley, a florist and fruiterer, and was educated at St Ann's School in Hanwell in Ealing. After leaving school at the age of fourteen, he hired a horse and cart to move earth, and then went into the landscape gardening business. One of his first major contracts was re-laying the pitch at Highbury for Arsenal FC.

In November 1931, at Holy Trinity Church, Southall, Sunley married Mary Goddard, a daughter of William Goddard, a farmer, of Waxlow Farm, Southall. They had two daughters and a son.

From earth-moving, Sunley moved into the open-cast mining business. In 1940, he founded Bernard Sunley & Sons. During the Second World War he built over 100 airfields, and in 1942 he purchased the business of Blackwood Hodge, then a supplier of agricultural machinery and later a successful plant hire and sale business. He subsequently "ranked alongside the most successful property developers of the 1950s property boom".

Sunley campaigned as a Conservative Party candidate for Ealing West in 1945, but was unsuccessful.

Sunley established the Bernard Sunley Charitable Foundation in 1960 with a pledge of £300,000 worth of shares. As of 2011, it had made grants of more than £92 million.

Sunley died in 1964. His son, John Sunley (died 2011) was a property developer and philanthropist. His grandson is Richard Tice, a businessman and deputy leader of Reform UK.

Bernard Sunley Hall, named after him, is a hall of residence for Imperial College London students at 40–44 Evelyn Gardens.

== See also ==
- City Tower, Manchester (formerly Sunley House)
