= City Tower, Manchester =

Office building in Manchester, England

City Tower
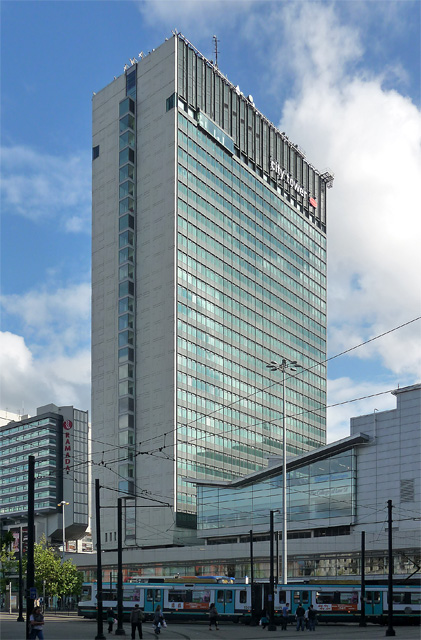
- Former names: Sunley House

General information
- Status: Completed
- Type: Office, communication, retail
- Architectural style: Modernist
- Location: Manchester, England
- Coordinates: 53°28′49″N 2°14′18″W
- Completed: 1965; 61 years ago
- Owner: Schroders

Height
- Antenna spire: 123 m (404 ft)
- Roof: 107 m (351 ft)
- Top floor: 28

Technical details
- Floor count: 30
- Floor area: 20,905 m^{2} (225,020 sq ft)
- Lifts/elevators: 8

Design and construction
- Architect: Covell, Matthews & Partners
- Developer: Bernard Sunley & Sons

Website
- citytower-manchester.co.uk

City Tower (formerly Sunley House) is a 30-storey high-rise office building situated in the Piccadilly Gardens area of Manchester city centre, England. As of June 2026, it is the 25th-tallest building in Greater Manchester, with a roof height of 107 metres (351 ft). It is the second-tallest office building in Manchester after the CIS Tower (118 m (387 ft)), and the third-tallest outside London after CIS Tower and 103 Colmore Row in Birmingham (108 m (354 ft)).

== History ==
City Tower was completed in 1965, one of three buildings forming the Piccadilly Plaza complex which was designed by Covell, Matthews & Partners and developed by Bernard Sunley & Sons between 1959 and 1965.

The Piccadilly Plaza was remodelled by Leslie Jones Architects in 2001–02. City Tower stands at right angles to Piccadilly and the north-facing wall is covered with designs based on circuit boards. During the remodelling of the building to the west of City Tower, Eagle Star House was replaced by a building whose roofs are a pale echo of the swooping roofs of the original.

The tower has retail and leisure units on the ground floor and is Manchester's main radio transmitting station, which is located on the roof. The developer Bruntwood sold City Tower to the asset management company Schroders for £132 million in 2014, but kept their headquarters in the building.

== Description ==
The tower has entrances on York Street (renamed New York Street in 2008) and Piccadilly Gardens (formerly Parker Street). A refurbishment programme was drawn up in the late 1990s, but this was never realised until Bruntwood purchased Piccadilly Plaza for £65 million in 2004. A new central ground floor entrance was subsequently installed. The next phase involved repainting and fitting an atrium to the sides of the tower. An advertising screen was erected showing video clips to passers-by in the gardens.

The tower is one of Manchester's main broadcast transmission sites, hosting the antennae of local radio stations Radio X, Radio X 90s and Capital on FM and digital radio multiplexes Digital One, BBC and CE Manchester. Permission to broadcast the smallscale superlocal DAB multiplex for Manchester from the City Tower transmitter, to boost its reception in and around the city centre, was granted by Ofcom in June 2025.

The penthouse on floor 28 differs from the other floors as it originally had a walkway around the perimeter. When Bruntwood acquired City Tower, they removed the walkway and installed wider windows. The redesign included an overhang with floor to ceiling windows.

Although City Tower is not the tallest building in the city, the 28th floor is the highest commercial office space in Manchester. This floor is now split in two halves, with one half, the Skylounge, open-access for City Tower residents.

== Gallery ==
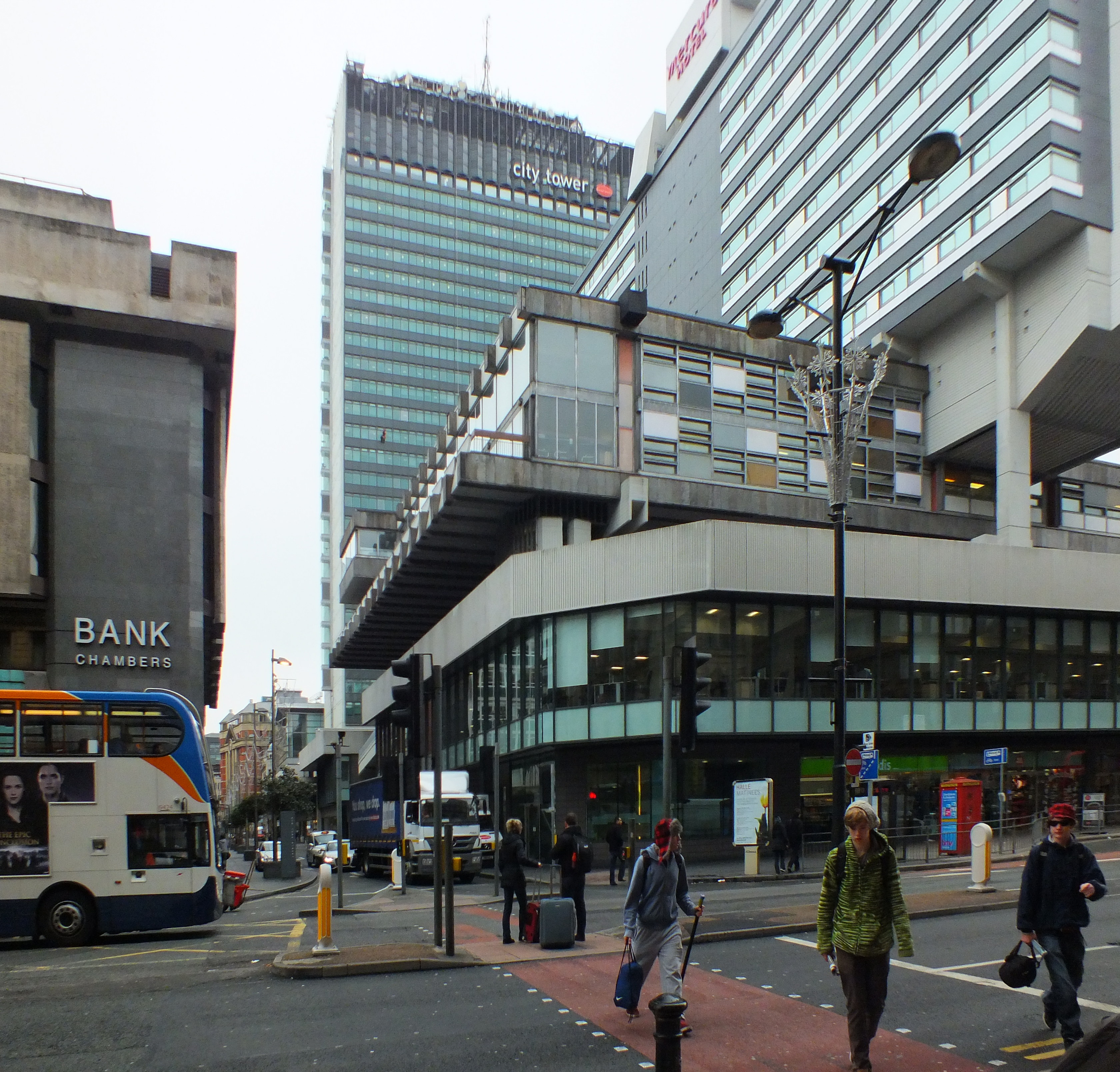
View of part of the Piccadilly Plaza, including City Tower

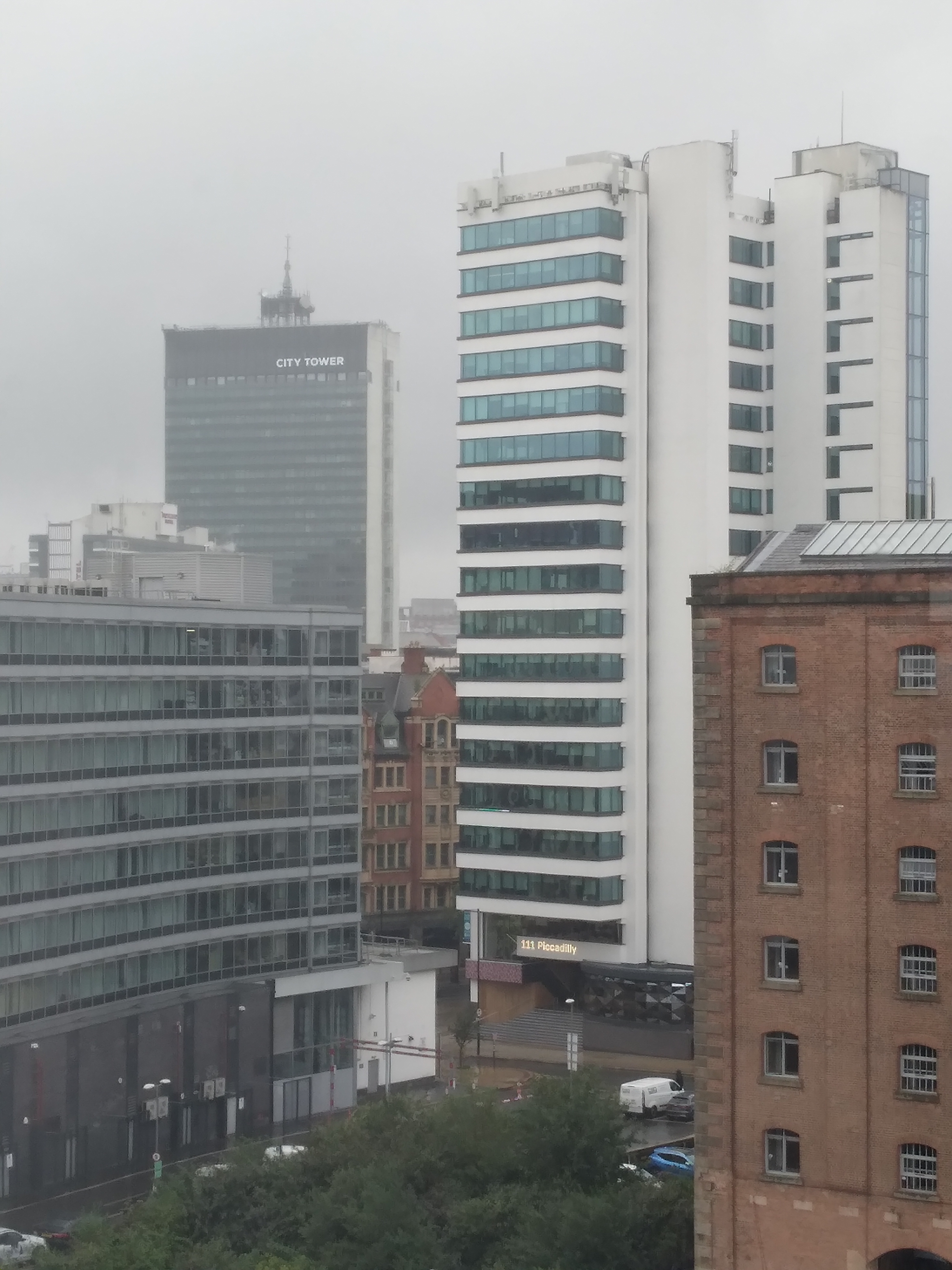
City Tower as seen from Piccadilly Gate (beside Piccadilly station)

== See also ==
- Architecture of Manchester
- List of tallest buildings and structures in Greater Manchester
- List of tallest buildings in the United Kingdom
