= Bernard Sunley & Sons =

British property development company

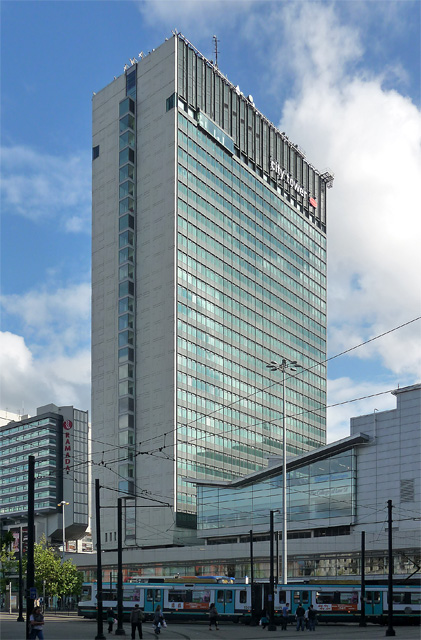
City Tower, Manchester (formerly Sunley House)

Bernard Sunley & Sons was a British property development company.

It was founded in 1940 as Bernard Sunley & Son by Bernard Sunley (1910–1964) who "ranked alongside the most successful property developers of the 1950s property boom".

The company was dissolved in 2011.

== Notable buildings ==
- Merton Civic Centre (1960)
- Arlington House, Margate (1964)
- City Tower, Manchester (1965)
