= Minster railway station =

Railway station in Kent, England

Coordinates: 51.329°N 1.317°E

Minster
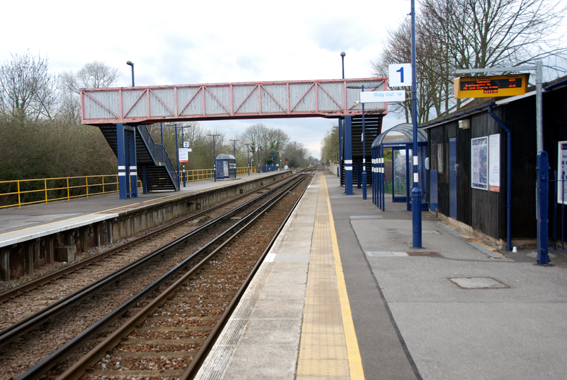

General information
- Location: Minster-in-Thanet, Thanet; England
- Grid reference: TR311641
- Manager: Southeastern
- Platforms: 2

Other information
- Station code: MSR
- Classification: DfT category F1

Key dates
- 13 April 1846: Opened as Minster
- 1 January 1852: Renamed Minster Junction
- 1 August 1901: Renamed Minster Junction (Thanet)
- 7 May 1945: Renamed Minster (Thanet)
- 1952: Renamed Minster (Thanet), Junction for Sandwich, Deal and Walmer
- 1971: Renamed Minster

Passengers
- 2020/21: ▼20,300
- Interchange: ▼594
- 2021/22: ▲49,964
- Interchange: ▲1,897
- 2022/23: ▲66,606
- Interchange: ▲2,031
- 2023/24: ▲84,238
- Interchange: ▼1,695
- 2024/25: ▲91,432
- Interchange: ▲1,918
Location
Notes
- Passenger statistics from the Office of Rail and Road

Minster railway station serves the village of Minster in Kent and surrounding villages. It is next to a junction between Canterbury West, Ramsgate and Sandwich.

== Facilities ==
The station, and all trains serving it, are operated by Southeastern. On the Ramsgate-bound platform, there is a ticket machine offering a full range of tickets. The former booking office is still standing but no longer in use.

== History ==
The station was opened on 13 April 1846 by the South Eastern Railway (SER) on the Ashford to Ramsgate (via Canterbury West) line. To the east is the junction station for the SER branch line to Deal via Sandwich - itself opened on 1 July 1847.

Originally there was no connection for trains running from Ramsgate SER Station to Deal and services were provided from a bay platform. Services from Sandwich and Deal terminated at Minster, where passengers then had to change trains for services towards Ramsgate. A connecting spur opened in October 1858 to resolve this issue.

Along with other stations along the line, electrification took place in 1962, with services beginning on 18 June. Goods services were withdrawn on 9 September 1963. A set of refuge sidings were retained, which closed later.

The station has had a number of names over its lifetime. It was renamed Minster Junction on 1 January 1852, then Minster Junction (Thanet) on 1 August 1901, Minster (Thanet) on 7 May 1945, and reverting to Minster around 1971.

== Services ==
All services at Minster are operated by Southeastern using Class 375 EMUs.

The typical off-peak service in trains per hour is:

- 1 tph to London Charing Cross via Tonbridge
- 1 tph to Ramsgate

During the peak hours, the station is also served by trains to London Cannon Street. In addition, a small number of services on the Kent Coast Line double run to serve and reverse at Minster between Ramsgate and Sandwich and vice versa.

The station is also served by a single early morning service to London St Pancras International, operated by a Class 395 EMU.

Preceding station	National Rail	Following station
Sturry	Southeastern Ashford to Ramsgate Line	Thanet Parkway
Sandwich	Southeastern Kent Coast Line Peak Hours Only	Ramsgate
	Disused railways	
Grove Ferry and Upstreet	Southern Railway Kent Coast Line	Richborough Castle Halt
Grove Ferry and Upstreet	British Rail; Southern Region Ashford to Ramsgate Line	Ebbsfleet and Cliffsend Halt
