= Martin Mill railway station =

Railway station in Kent, England

Coordinates: 51.171°N 1.348°E

Martin Mill
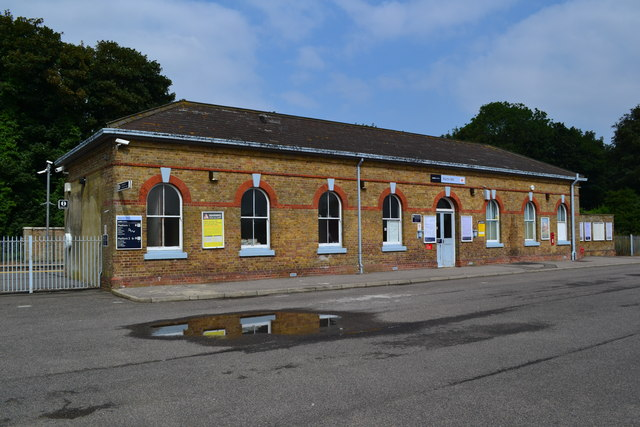
- Martin Mill station

General information
- Location: Martin Mill, Dover; England
- Grid reference: TR341466
- Manager: Southeastern
- Platforms: 2

Other information
- Station code: MTM
- Classification: DfT category E

History
- Opened: 15 June 1881
- Original company: Dover and Deal Joint Railway
- Pre-grouping: Dover and Deal Joint Railway
- Post-grouping: Southern Railway

Passengers
- 2021/22: ▲37,658
- 2022/23: ▲45,894
- 2023/24: ▲57,212
- 2024/25: ▲68,058
- 2025/26: ▼65,668
Location
Notes
- Passenger statistics from the Office of Rail and Road

Martin Mill railway station serves the small village of Martin Mill in East Kent, England. The station and all trains serving it are operated by Southeastern.

== History ==
The station was opened on 15 June 1881 by the Dover and Deal Joint Railway, when it opened the line from an end-on connection at Deal to Buckley Junction near Dover. The line was the only one jointly owned by the rival South Eastern Railway and London, Chatham and Dover Railway and remained independent until the Grouping. The line has been described as one of the more spectacular in southern England, with Martin Mill at the apex on a 400-foot-high plateau.

The station was built with two platforms either side of a double track, a signal box was located to the south with a goods yard to the south-east. The goods yard could handle most types of goods, including live stock, and it was equipped with a 10-ton crane.

The station was host to a Southern Railway camping coach from 1938 to 1939. Two camping coaches were positioned here by the Southern Region from 1954 to 1959, then three coaches in 1960 and 1961 then they were replaced by three Pullman camping coaches from 1962 to 1967.

=== Military history ===
Martin Mill also served as an important station during both the First and Second World Wars. During the construction of Dover Harbour in 1897, a single track branch was constructed to bring in materials from Martin Mill. The track ran over the surface of the high chalk plateau parallel with the Dover-Deal main line, before climbing up to the summit just at the entrance to Guston tunnel. From there, it ascended to the cliff top, 350 ft above sea level. It then descended in a zig-zag formation on a vertiginous shelf which was cut into the cliff, leading down to the eastern part of the harbour. The route was reopened during both wars and operated mainly by Royal Engineers to deploy mounted artillery on the cliff edge.

During the Second World War, the branch served the many gun batteries along the white cliffs between Dover and St Margarets including the two 14 inch guns/cannons nicknamed Winnie (after Winston Churchill) and Pooh (after the fictional bear). The military railway was also used by three railway guns, Gladiator, Sceneshifter and Piecemaker, which were WW1 railway gun carriages bearing their original gun names but carrying 13.5" naval guns. There were three curved firing spurs on the military railway designed for use by the rail guns. During the war, the batteries controlled the Dover Straits, but the larger guns fired into France, mainly at the numerous German gun batteries who were shelling the Dover area from August 1940.

This line also ran down to Dover Harbour along a cliff road.

== Facilities ==
The booking office is open only on weekday mornings, however a ticket machine on the Dover-bound platform caters for out-of-hours ticketing.

For many years, the ticket office acted as a Post Office for the local community.

== Services ==
All services at Martin Mill are operated by Southeastern using Class 375 and 395 electric multiple units.

The typical off-peak service in trains per hour is:

- 1 tph to London St Pancras International
- 1 tph to Ramsgate.

Additional services, including trains to and from London Charing Cross via Tonbridge call at the station during the peak hours.

Preceding station	National Rail	Following station
Dover Priory	Southeastern Kent Coast Line	Walmer
