= Walmer railway station =

Railway station in Kent, England

Coordinates: 51.203°N 1.383°E

Walmer
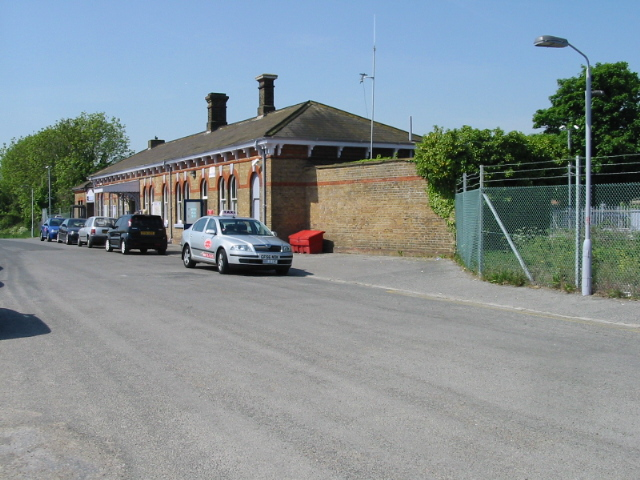

General information
- Location: Walmer, Dover; England
- Grid reference: TR364503
- Manager: Southeastern
- Platforms: 2

Other information
- Station code: WAM
- Classification: DfT category E

History
- Opened: 17 June 1881
- Original company: Dover and Deal Joint Railway
- Pre-grouping: Dover and Deal Joint Railway
- Post-grouping: Southern Railway

Passengers
- 2020/21: ▼64,392
- 2021/22: ▲0.147 million
- 2022/23: ▲0.179 million
- 2023/24: ▲0.200 million
- 2024/25: ▲0.222 million
Location
Notes
- Passenger statistics from the Office of Rail and Road

Walmer railway station serves Walmer in Kent, England. The station and all trains serving it are operated by Southeastern.

== Facilities ==
The station has two platforms, connected by a subway. A ticket office is open part-time.

== History ==
The first plans for a station here were by the Kent Railway in 1836. However, Walmer was slow to grow as a resort compared to many other towns on the Kent coastline, and progress stalled. Further schemes to connect Walmer to the railway network were proposed in November 1846 and March 1854, but neither secured sufficient funding. The London, Chatham and Dover Railway (LDCR) announced plans for a line between Walmer, Deal and Adisham in October 1872, but failed to secure the authorisation from Parliament.

Construction of the station was delayed owing to problems buying the relevant land, and it cost £14,000 to build. The station was opened on 15 June 1881 by the Dover and Deal Joint Railway when it opened the line from an end-on connection at Deal to Buckley Junction near Dover. The line was the only one jointly owned by the rival South Eastern Railway and London, Chatham and Dover Railway and remained independent until the Grouping. The line has been described as one of the more spectacular in southern England. Gas lighting was installed at the station by the end of the year. A station closer to the sea was proposed in 1898, but rejected.

A Pullman camping coach was positioned here by the Southern Region from 1963 to 1967. Goods services were withdrawn from the station in 1961.

== Services ==
All services at Walmer are operated by Southeastern using Class 375 and 395 EMUs. The High Speed service from Walmer began in 2014.

The typical off-peak service in trains per hour is:

- 1 tph to London St Pancras International via Dover Priory
- 1 tph to Ramsgate

Additional services, including trains to and from London Charing Cross via Tonbridge call at the station during the peak hours.

Preceding station	National Rail	Following station
Martin Mill	Southeastern Kent Coast Line	Deal

== Incidents ==
On 6 July 1898, a set of vehicles at the station broke free and ran down the incline towards Deal, where they collided with an empty train, causing £269 of damage.
