= Ebbsfleet and Cliffsend Halt railway station =

Disused railway station in Ebbsfleet, Thanet

Ebbsfleet and Cliffsend Halt

General information
- Location: Ebbsfleet, Kent; England
- Coordinates: 51.3292°N 1.356°E
- Grid reference: TR338642
- Platforms: 2

Other information
- Status: Disused

History
- Original company: South Eastern and Chatham Railway
- Post-grouping: Southern Railway

Key dates
- 7 May 1908: Opened
- 1 April 1933: Closed
- 31 July 2023: Reopened as Thanet Parkway
Location

Ebbsfleet and Cliffsend Halt railway station served the hamlet of Ebbsfleet, Thanet, Kent, England from 1908 to 1933 on the Kent Coast Line.

== History ==
The station opened on 7 May 1908 by the South Eastern and Chatham Railway. It closed to both passengers and goods traffic on 1 April 1933. The new Thanet Parkway station has been built about 100 metres east of the site of the original station.

Preceding station	Historical railways	Following station
St Lawrence for Pegwell Bay; Line open, station closed	South Eastern Railway; Kent Coast Line	Richborough Castle Halt; Line open, station closed
St Lawrence for Pegwell Bay; Line open, station closed	South Eastern Railway; Ashford to Ramsgate line	Minster; Line and station open
