= Chilham railway station =

Railway station in Chilham, Kent

Coordinates: 51.245°N 0.976°E

Chilham
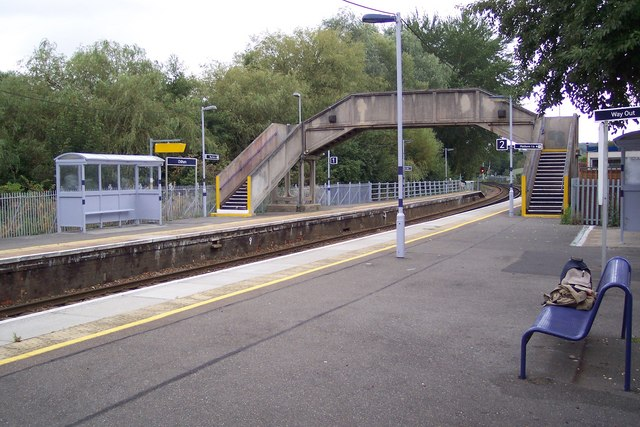

General information
- Location: Chilham, Ashford; England
- Grid reference: TR077536
- Manager: Southeastern
- Platforms: 2

Other information
- Station code: CIL
- Classification: DfT category F2

History
- Opened: 6 February 1846

Passengers
- 2020/21: ▼15,658
- 2021/22: ▲40,214
- 2022/23: ▲48,300
- 2023/24: ▲59,724
- 2024/25: ▲66,206
Location
Notes
- Passenger statistics from the Office of Rail and Road

Chilham railway station is a railway station in Chilham, Kent. It is on the Ashford to Ramsgate line between Ashford International and Canterbury West. The station, and all trains serving it, are operated by Southeastern.

== History ==
The station was opened by the South Eastern Railway (SER) on 6 February 1846, as the first part of their line towards Thanet, which opened as far as Canterbury West on this date.

There are level crossings near both ends of the station, since the SER were unsure about the levels of traffic on the line and decided to cross several roads at-grade instead of bridges. Trains that delayed cars at the crossings for more than five minutes would be fined.

The station attracted attention from other railway companies. A proposal was put forward for a branch line from Chilham to Faversham, but rejected by the SER. In retrospect, this turned out to be a mistake as the East Kent Railway, later to become the London, Chatham & Dover Railway (LCDR), built their own line to Faversham, competing with the SER for London - Thanet traffic. In response, the SER proposed building a line from its station at Strood to Chilham across the River Medway and the North Downs, in order to cut demand for the LCDR. This plan was withdrawn after the SER realised such a scheme would probably involve also constructing a line from Canterbury to Dover.

Goods services were withdrawn from the station on 15 August 1966.

== Accidents and incidents ==
- On 20 October 1848, a fish and luggage train was derailed near Chilham when a bridge over the River Stour was washed away under it. All three crew were uninjured.
- On 11 August 1858, an excursion train was derailed near Chilham. Three people were killed.
- On 15 July 1970, an electric multiple unit was in collision with a lorry on an occupation crossing between Chartham and Chilham due to an error by the crossing keeper. The driver of the lorry and the guard of the train were killed.
- On 26 July 2015, electric multiple unit 375703 was in collision with a herd of cattle on the line between Wye and Chilham. Two carriages were derailed. There were no injuries amongst the 70 passengers.

== Services ==
All services at Chilham are operated by Southeastern using Class 375 EMUs.

The typical off-peak service in trains per hour is:

- 1 tph to London Charing Cross via Tonbridge
- 1 tph to Ramsgate

Additional services, including trains to and from London Cannon Street and London St Pancras International call at the station during the peak hours.

Preceding station	National Rail	Following station
Wye	Southeastern Ashford to Ramsgate Line	Chartham
