= Thanet Parkway railway station =

Railway station in Thanet, Kent, England

Coordinates: 51.330843°N 1.361777°E

Thanet Parkway
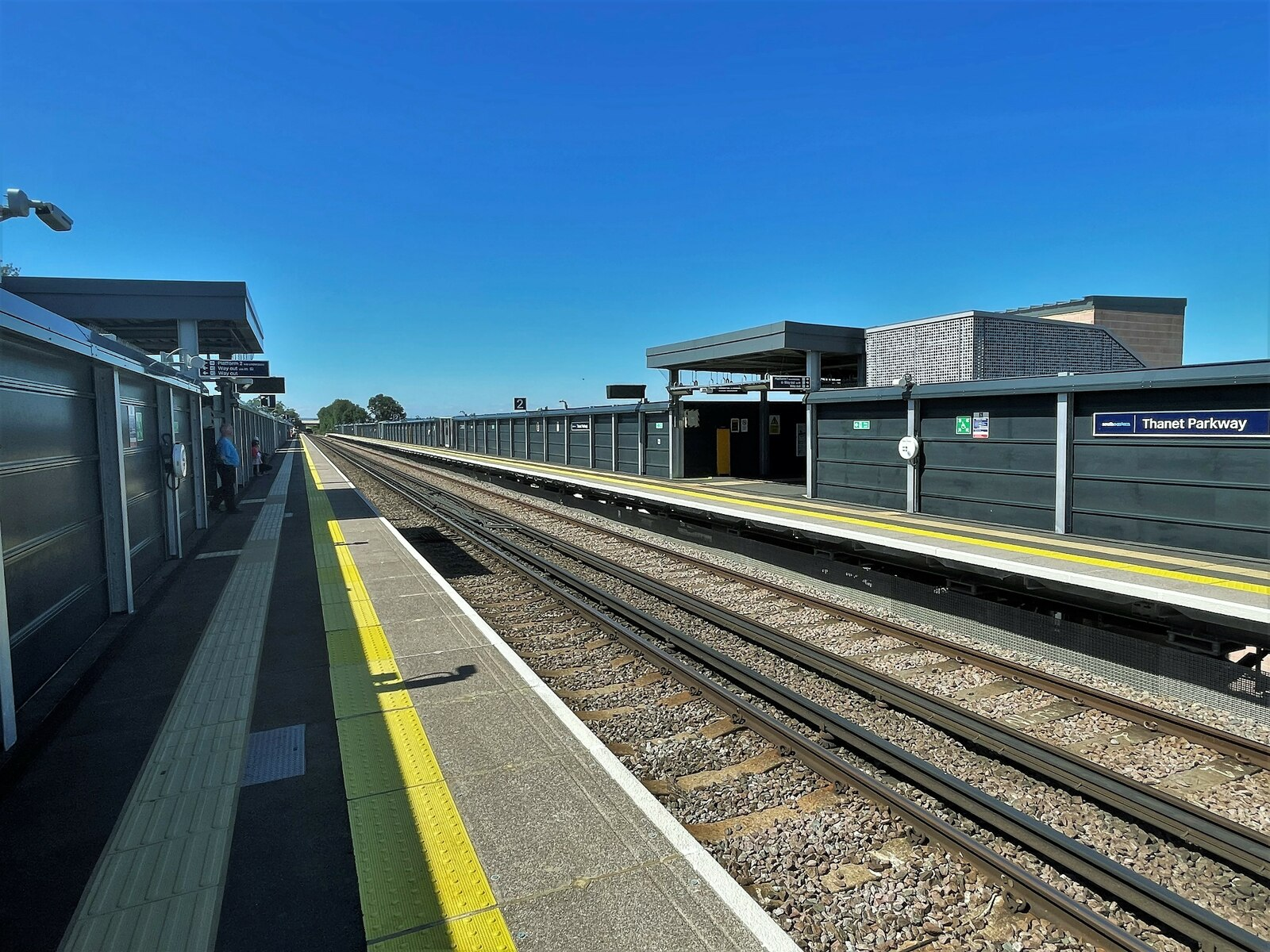

General information
- Location: Cliffsend; Thanet, Kent; England
- Grid reference: TR343645
- Manager: Southeastern
- Platforms: 2

Other information
- Station code: THP

Key dates
- 31 July 2023: Opened

Passengers
- 2023/24: 57,238
- Interchange: 289
- 2024/25: ▲0.124 million
- Interchange: ▲824
Location

Thanet Parkway railway station is a railway station in Cliffsend, Kent, that serves Discovery Park Enterprise Zone and new housing developments. It opened on 31 July 2023.

== History ==
=== Early proposal ===
In 2012, the developer Cogent announced a planned 800-home development at Manston Green, which would include a parkway station on the Ashford - Canterbury - Ramsgate Line. The new station would also serve Kent International Airport via a bus link. A planning application for this was due to be submitted before the end of 2013.

=== Revised proposal ===
The revised proposal by Kent County Council (KCC) was for a Thanet Parkway station on the same section of line but to the west of Cliffsend. This proposal by KCC underwent public consultation in 2015 and was granted planning permission in 2020. Preliminary ground clearance work started in early 2021.

The project is funded with £14 million from the South East Local Enterprise Partnership via the Local Growth Fund, £12 million from the UK Government Getting Building Fund, £3.4 million from the New Stations Fund, £2 million from Thanet District Council, £700,000 from the East Kent Spatial Development Company and £5.8 million from Kent County Council. £875,000 of extra UK Government funding was required in 2022.

As of April 2023 construction was reported as substantially complete, although the originally targeted May 2023 opening date had been delayed to 31 July the same year.

Aerial view of construction at Thanet Parkway railway station, Kent.

== Response ==
The station has had a mixed response from passengers. Local residents have questioned its location, and its priority over other rail improvements. Southeastern responded by saying it was popular with commuters and hoped would carry 100,000 passengers in its first year. This target was not met, but achieved shortly afterwards.

== Services ==
All services at Thanet Parkway are operated by Southeastern using Class 375 and 395 EMUs.

The typical off-peak service in trains per hour is:

- 1 tph to London St Pancras International
- 1 tph to London Charing Cross via Tonbridge
- 2 tph to Ramsgate of which 1 continues to Margate

Additional services, including trains to and from London Cannon Street, and trains via Dover Priory call at the station during the peak hours.

Preceding station	National Rail	Following station
Minster	Southeastern Ashford to Ramsgate Line	Ramsgate
Canterbury West	Southeastern High Speed 1	Ramsgate
Sandwich	Southeastern Kent Coast Line Peak Hours Only	Ramsgate
