= Sandwich railway station =

Railway station in Kent, England

Coordinates: 51°16′12″N 01°20′33″E

Sandwich
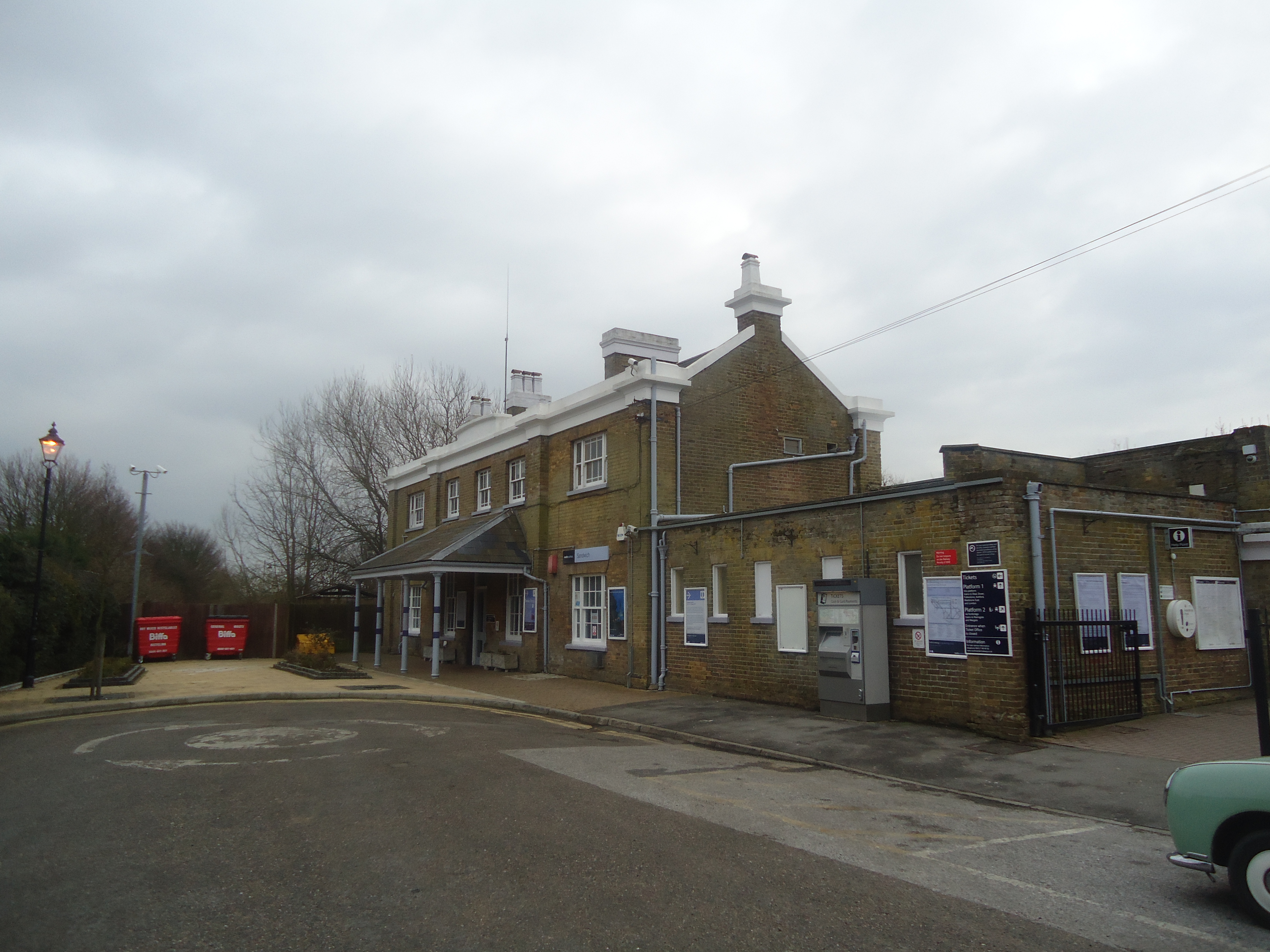

General information
- Location: Sandwich, Dover; England
- Grid reference: TR332576
- Manager: Southeastern
- Platforms: 2

Other information
- Station code: SDW
- Classification: DfT category E

History
- Opened: 1 July 1847

Passengers
- 2020/21: ▼0.106 million
- 2021/22: ▲0.282 million
- 2022/23: ▼0.268 million
- 2023/24: ▲0.308 million
- 2024/25: ▲0.320 million
Location
Notes
- Passenger statistics from the Office of Rail and Road

Sandwich railway station serves Sandwich in Kent, England. The station, and all trains serving it, are operated by Southeastern. The station is 8 1/4 miles (13.3 km) south of Ramsgate on the Kent Coast Line.

== History ==
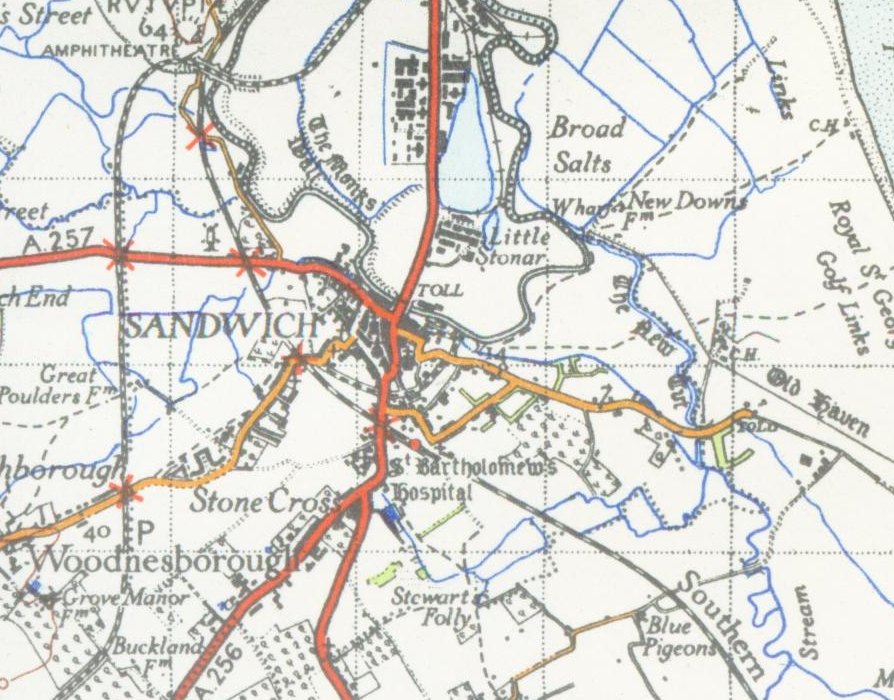
A 1945 Ordnance Survey map of Sandwich showing the station along with the East Kent Light Railway

The first proposal for a station at Sandwich was in 1836–37 by the Kent Railway. An independent line to London was considered, but the South Eastern Railway (SER) decided they would construct a branch line from the Ashford to Ramsgate line at Minster towards Sandwich and Deal. The station was opened on 1 July 1847.

Sandwich had once been a significant port in the Middle Ages, but because of changing geography had suffered a lengthy decline. It was hoped a railway would reverse this trend. In 1853, the Sandwich Improvement Association hoped to collaborate with the SER and develop a more significant seaport here, but the SER were not interested. The station initially had a very limited service, with only seven trains running each way, and between 1855 and 1865 the line was single track. A connection to Dover Priory opened on 15 June 1881.

Goods services were withdrawn on 7 October 1963.

In 2019, a major programme began to expand the station in preparation for The Open Championship at the Royal St George's Golf Club. The platforms were extended by 80 metres (260 ft) so they could accommodate the full 12-car British Rail Class 395 trains. The work was completed in early 2021, in time for the 2021 Open Championship.

== Services ==
All services at Sandwich are operated by Southeastern using Class 375 and 395 EMUs.

The typical off-peak service in trains per hour is:

- 1 tph to London St Pancras International
- 1 tph to Ramsgate

Additional services, including trains to and from London Charing Cross via Tonbridge call at the station during the peak hours.

Preceding station	National Rail	Following station
Deal	Southeastern Kent Coast Line	Ramsgate
Deal	Southeastern Kent Coast Line	Minster Limited Service
	Disused railways	
Deal Line and station open	Southern Railway Kent Coast Line	Richborough Castle Halt Line open, station closed
