= Grove Ferry and Upstreet railway station =

Disused railway station in Kent, England

Grove Ferry and Upstreet
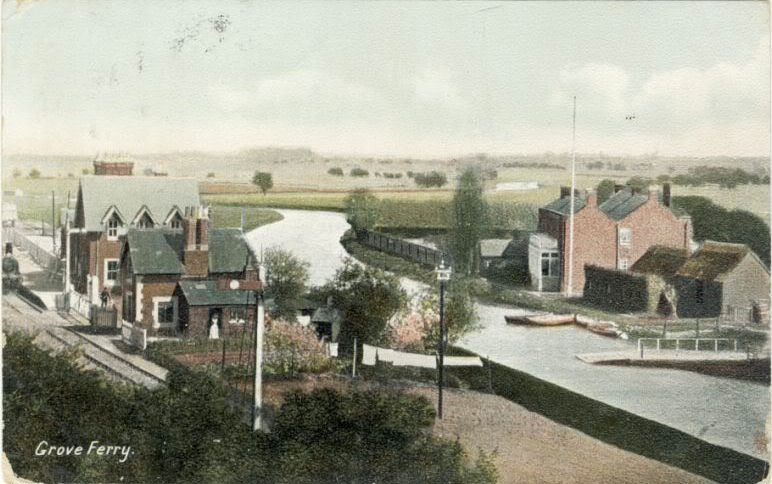
- Grove Ferry Railway Station 1907

General information
- Location: Upstreet, City of Canterbury; England
- Coordinates: 51°19′27″N 1°12′24″E
- Grid reference: TR 2352 6321
- Platforms: 2

Other information
- Status: Disused

History
- Original company: South Eastern Railway
- Pre-grouping: South Eastern and Chatham Railway
- Post-grouping: Southern Railway

Key dates
- 13 April 1846: Opened as Grove Ferry
- 20 September 1954: Renamed Grove Ferry and Upstreet
- 30 April 1960: Station closed to freight
- 3 January 1966: Station closed to passengers
Location

Grove Ferry and Upstreet was a railway station in east Kent. It was opened by South Eastern Railway (SER), on the Ashford to Ramsgate (via Canterbury West) line between Sturry station and Minster station.

== History ==
Grove Ferry station opened on 13 April 1846, the rural station was built to serve the village of Upstreet and the Grove Ferry crossing of the Great Stour until 1966, when a bridge was built. The nearby "Grove Ferry Inn" owned the rights to the ferry and farmed 17 acres (6.9 ha) of lavender, creating a popular day trip destination up until the Second World War. The public level crossing and goods sidings leading to the ferry were operated from a small signal box.

The station was renamed Grove Ferry & Upstreet in September 1954. Goods traffic ceased on 30 April 1960, The railway between Ashford and Minster was electrified on 9 October 1961. A concrete footbridge was built at the station in preparation for this change. The signal box closed on 14 March 1964, and the level crossing was converted to automatic half barriers on 3 January 1966. The station closed the same day, shortly before the introduction of a bus service over the new Grove Ferry Bridge, which would have undermined the low patronage.

== Remains today ==
The station buildings and up platform have been demolished and only a few traces remain of the down platform. The broad steps leading to the footpath connecting the station to the village, although overgrown, can still be seen. Grove Ferry and Upstreet Station lives on in model form due to the efforts of the Ashford Model Railway Club, with the model occasionally being taken on tour.

Preceding station	Disused railways	Following station
Chislet Colliery Halt	British Rail; Southern Region; Ashford to Ramsgate (via Canterbury West) line	Minster
