= Sturry railway station =

Railway station in Kent, England

Coordinates: 51°18′03.8″N 1°07′20″E

Sturry
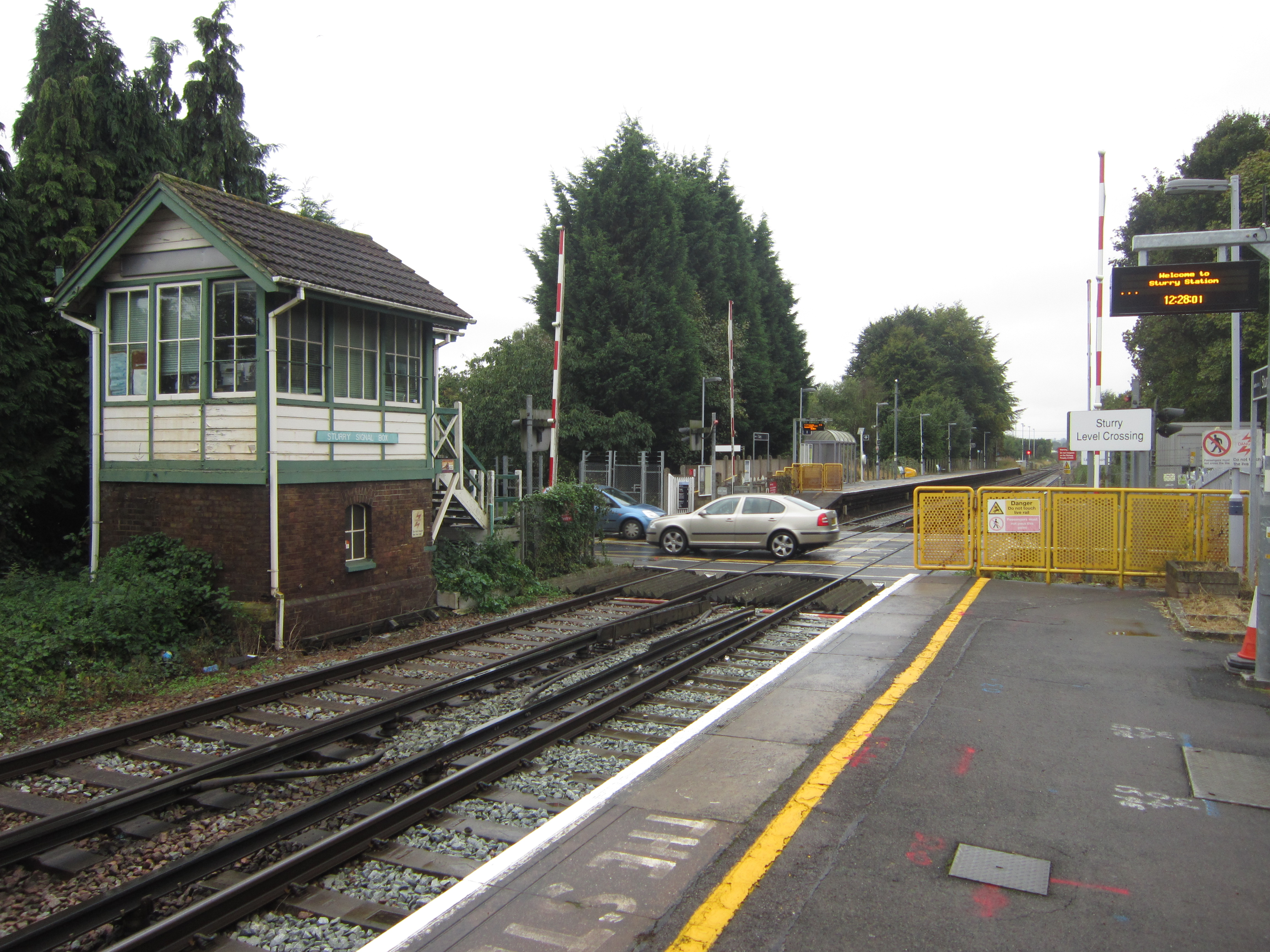
- Station platforms, signal box, and level crossing

General information
- Location: Sturry, Canterbury; England
- Grid reference: TR177603
- Manager: Southeastern
- Platforms: 2

Other information
- Station code: STU
- Classification: DfT category E

Key dates
- 1 June 1847: Opened

Passengers
- 2020/21: ▼30,658
- 2021/22: ▲72,344
- 2022/23: ▲85,020
- 2023/24: ▲92,098
- 2024/25: ▲0.112 million
Location
Notes
- Passenger statistics from the Office of Rail and Road

Sturry railway station is a railway station Kent, England, serving Sturry and Fordwich on the Ashford to Ramsgate line in Kent. It is 2 1/4 miles (3.6 km) north east of Canterbury West, and lies either side of a level crossing. The station and all trains serving it are operated by Southeastern.

== Location and facilities ==
The station is north of Sturry village. It is also the nearest station to the town of Fordwich.

The two platforms are staggered and are either side of the A28 road which passes through a central level crossing. The A291 road to Herne Bay is also near the station. Platform 1 provides services towards Canterbury West, Ashford International and London. Platform 2 provides services towards Ramsgate and Margate. This platform also has a part-time staffed booking office and ticket machines.

The unusual layout of the station has caused problems, as there is no direct pedestrian access between the two platforms. In 2020, a man was fined for trespassing by Network Rail when he jumped the level crossing barriers in order to make a train connection.

== History ==
The station was opened by the South Eastern Railway on 1 June 1847 It was on the line from Canterbury West to Ramsgate, which had opened on 13 April the previous year. A booking office was added in 1851.

In 1887, the station was renamed Sturry for Herne Bay. It reverted to its original name around 1898.

The line through the station was electrified in 1962, with new services starting on 18 June.

== Services ==
All services at Sturry are operated by Southeastern using Class 375 EMUs.

The typical off-peak service in trains per hour is:

- 1 tph to London Charing Cross via Tonbridge
- 1 tph to Ramsgate

Additional services, including trains to and from London Cannon Street and London St Pancras International call at the station during the peak hours.

Preceding station	National Rail	Following station
Canterbury West	Southeastern Ashford to Ramsgate Line	Minster
	Disused railways	
Canterbury West	British Rail Southern Region Ashford to Ramsgate Line	Chislet Colliery Halt
