= Canterbury station =

Canterbury station may refer to:

- Canterbury station (CTA), former station on the Chicago "L"
- Canterbury railway station, Melbourne, in Victoria, Australia
- Canterbury railway station, Sydney, in New South Wales, Australia
- Stations in Canterbury, Kent, UK:
  - Canterbury North Lane railway station, former station
  - Canterbury East railway station
  - Canterbury South railway station, former station
  - Canterbury West railway station
  - Canterbury Parkway railway station, proposed station
