= Deal railway station =

Railway station in Kent, England

Deal
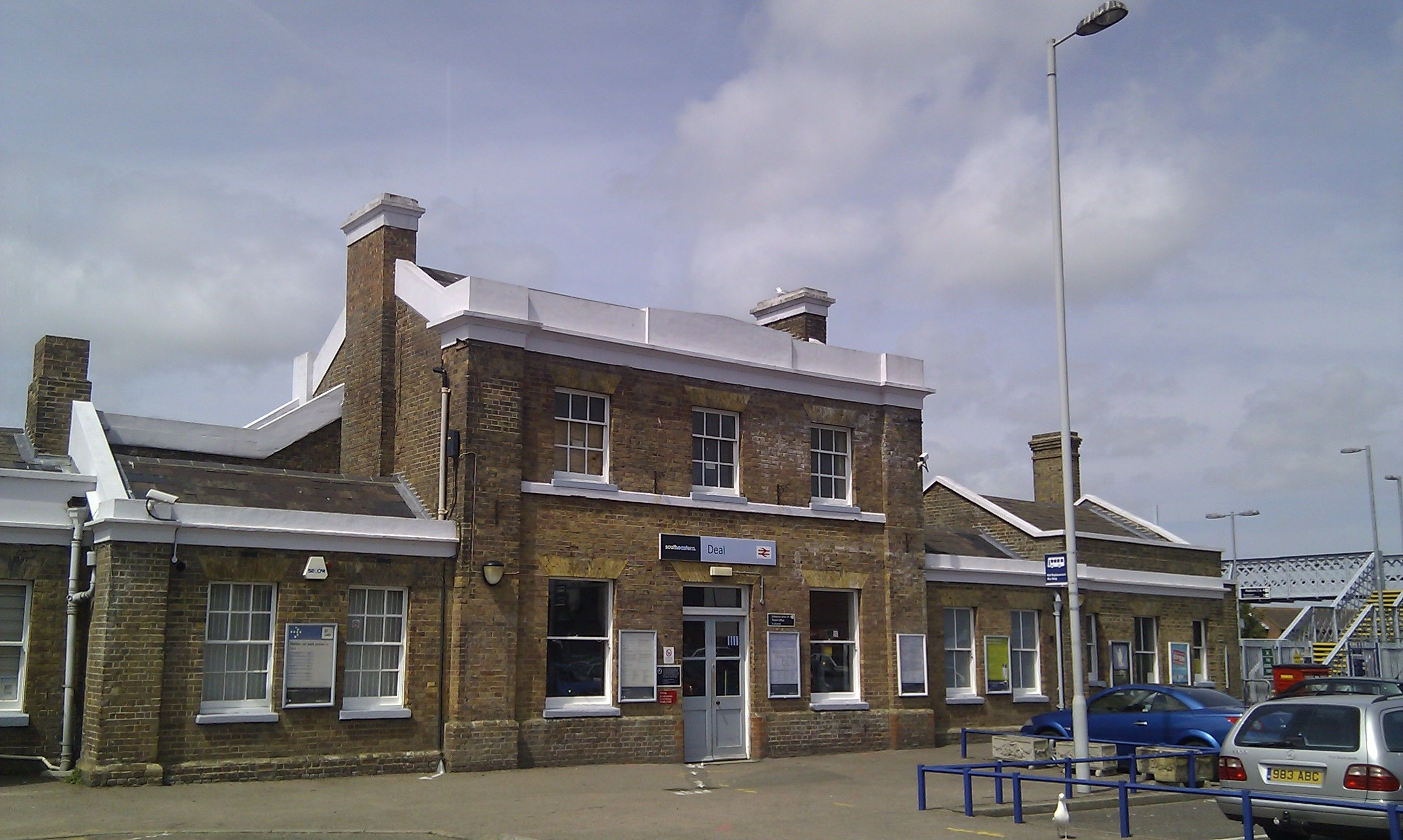
- Deal station is little-changed from when it was built in 1847 (May 2011)

General information
- Location: Deal, Dover; England
- Coordinates: 51.2231°N 1.3989°E
- Grid reference: TR374525
- Manager: Southeastern
- Platforms: 2

Other information
- Station code: DEA
- Classification: DfT category E

Key dates
- 1 July 1847: Opened
- 15 June 1881: Link to Dover
- 18 June 1962: Full electric services
- 5 September 2011: Direct high speed services

Passengers
- 2020/21: ▼0.164 million
- 2021/22: ▲0.394 million
- 2022/23: ▲0.428 million
- 2023/24: ▲0.493 million
- 2024/25: ▲0.530 million
Location
Notes
- Passenger statistics from the Office of Rail and Road

Deal railway station serves Deal in Kent, England. The station and all trains serving it are operated by Southeastern. The station is on the Kent Coast Line 9.5 miles (15.3 km) north east of Dover Priory and 86.75 miles (139.61 km) south east of London Charing Cross.

== History ==
=== Early years ===
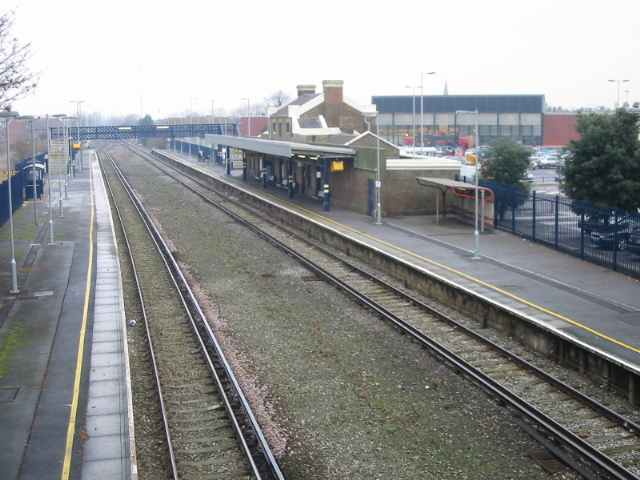
View north from London Road showing the gap between the tracks.

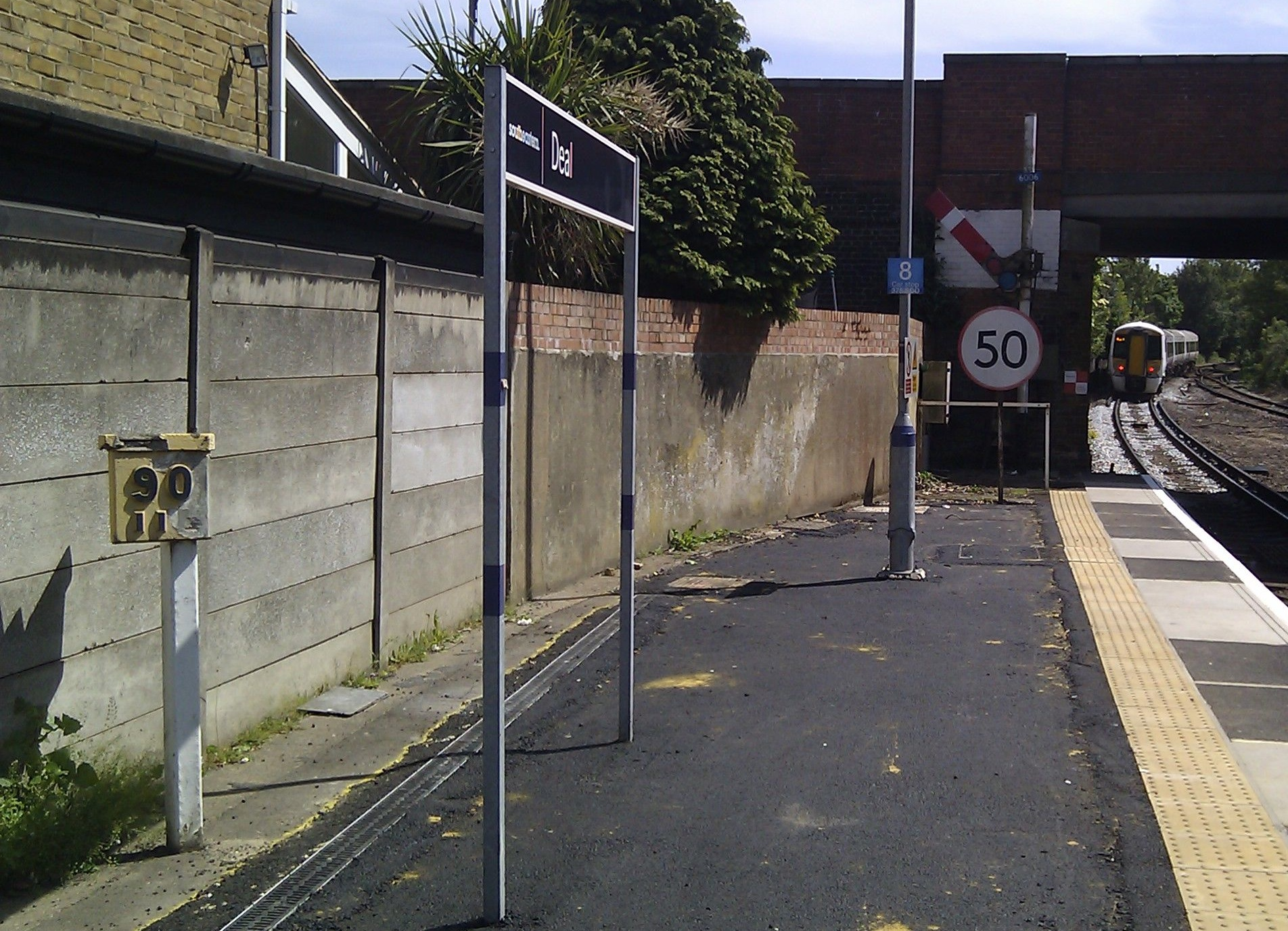
An Electrostar departs past the semaphore up starter signal with the 14:40 to Charing Cross on 23 May 2011

Deal was originally the terminus of a South Eastern Railway branch line from Minster Junction through Sandwich and opened on 1 July 1847. This meant the original services to London ran via Canterbury, Ashford, Tonbridge, Redhill and Croydon to London Bridge. Charles Dickens attended the celebrations that accompanied the opening of the line. The link south to Dover was delayed by commercial rivalry between the two Kent railway companies, the South Eastern Railway and the London, Chatham and Dover Railway. However, the companies finally agreed to build the line jointly and it opened on 15 June 1881.

The original single platform with its 2-storey 1847 building became the new 'up' platform. This line now continued south under a new flyover carrying London Road and necessitated demolition of the middle houses in Sunnyside Terrace. The siding next to this was extended to become a through siding. Finally, a new 'down' platform was built to the west with buildings similar to those at Walmer. The existence of this middle siding explains the gap between the current tracks. The footbridge, which originally had a roof, also dates to 1881.

Mileage on the line is measured from Charing Cross via Chelsfield and Canterbury West; on this basis, Deal is 90 miles 56 chains (146.0 km) from Charing Cross. Hence the milepost on the 'up' platform at Deal says 90¾ (via Canterbury) but Deal is actually only 86¾ miles from Charing Cross (via Dover).

Deal used to have extensive coal yards (bordered by St Patrick's Road), goods yards (now Sainsbury's) and a locomotive shed and turntable (now Bridgeside). The locomotive shed was shut in 1930. Albert Terrace was built in the 1860s for railway employees in a line with Lower Queen Street before the railway was extended to Dover. Hence the London Road flyover was built with a 'kink' around them. The station-master's house received a direct hit during World War 2 (although a garden wall still exists), as did the goods shed. The substantial buildings on the 'down' platform were demolished about 1970 and replaced with small CLASP-style buildings. These have since been replaced with a small modern shelter, as shown in the photograph on the right.

=== Signalling ===
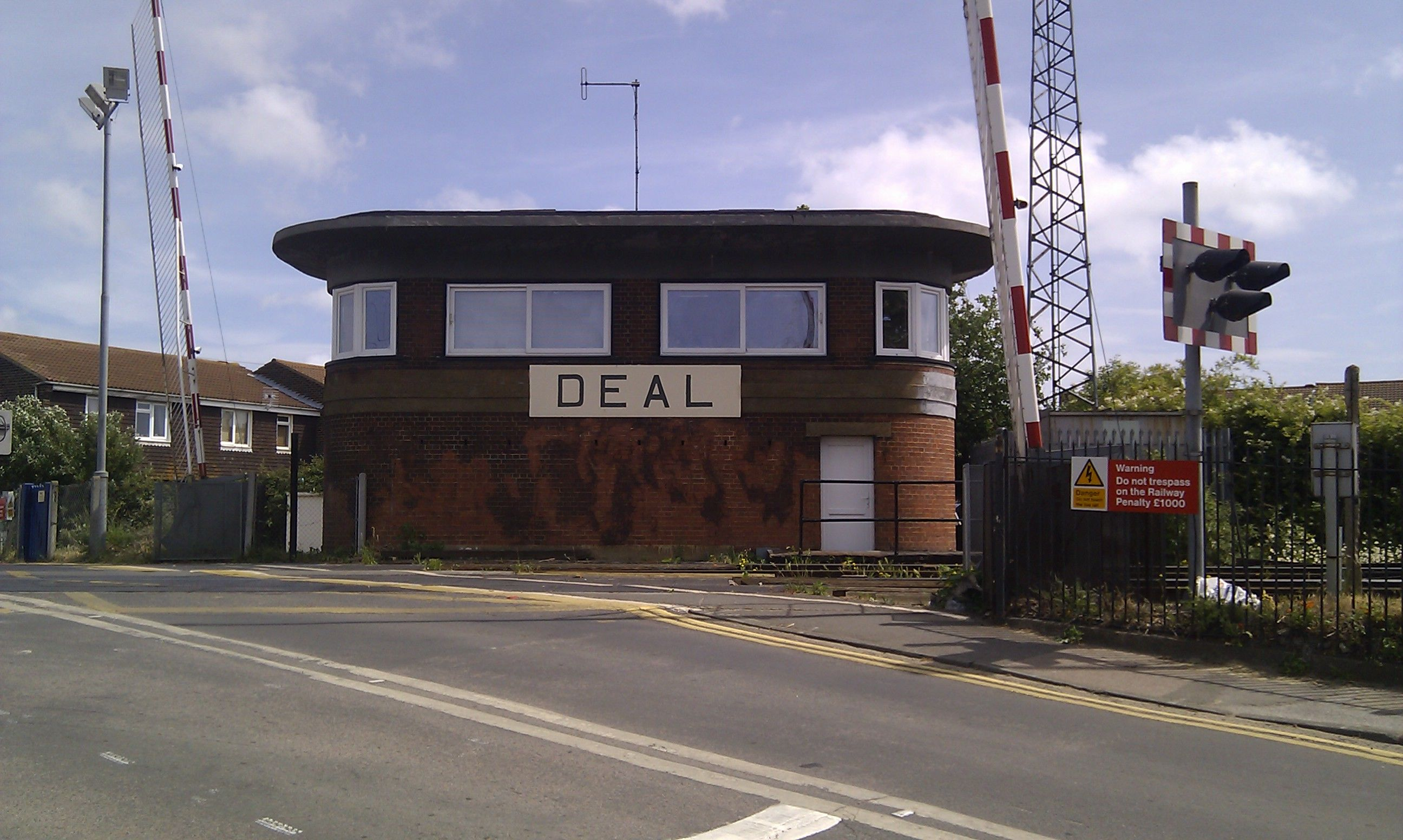
Deal's rare art deco signalbox dates from 1939

Deal retains its semaphore signals at the station and at Victoria Park.

The signal box moved from the platform to the Western Road level crossing in 1939. It is a good example of a Southern Railway odeon/art deco ‘glasshouse’ signal box (a Type 13). One siding remains, occasionally used for infrastructure trains.

=== Former services ===
During the 19th and early 20th centuries Deal enjoyed a higher status than now as a resort and, with extensive Royal Marine barracks, was a terminating/originating point for a number of trains travelling routes that seem unusual nowadays. Trains to/from London could run either north or south. For example, there were direct trains to Reading via Redhill, and a daily service to Birkenhead began in 1903 and continued for many years, surviving as a daily through train to Wolverhampton until 1962. There was also a daily train to Manchester before WW1 and regular daily trains to Victoria until the 1960s. From 1948 to 1962, the peak 16:56 service from Cannon Street that divided at Ashford was unusual in having both portions call at Deal. The portion via Dover called at Deal at 19:16, to Ramsgate. The portion via Canterbury called 3 minutes later, to Dover.

=== Electrification ===
Services through Deal were electrified using the 3rd rail system at 750 volts DC as Phase 2 of British Rail's Kent Coast Electrification Scheme. Some electric trains began running in 1961, with the full service beginning with the Summer timetable on 18 June 1962. There were 2 trains per hour (tph) off-peak, mostly from Charing Cross to Ramsgate, until May 1982, when the service was reduced to 1 tph off-peak (2 tph in the peaks).

== Services ==
All services at Deal are operated by Southeastern using Class 375 and 395 EMUs.

The typical off-peak service in trains per hour is:

- 1 tph to London St Pancras International via Dover Priory
- 1 tph to Ramsgate

Additional services, including trains to and from London Charing Cross via Tonbridge call at the station during the peak hours.

Preceding station	National Rail	Following station
Walmer	Southeastern Kent Coast Line	Sandwich

== TV ==
Deal and its station featured in an episode of the BBC TV Great British Railway Journeys, Series 2, that aired on BBC2 on 27 January 2011. Presenter Michael Portillo travelled from Ramsgate to Folkestone and spent the night at Deal's historic Royal Hotel. He explored local attractions including Walmer Castle and the Timeball Tower.

== Current facilities and access ==
Deal station has a ticket office, waiting room and café. The station building also incorporates toilets (including disabled access and baby-changing facilities), staff facilities, photo machine and snack machines. There is a help-point and automatic ticket machine on the platform.
