= Richborough Castle Halt railway station =

Disused railway station in Kent, England

Richborough Castle Halt

General information
- Location: Sandwich, Kent; England
- Coordinates: 51°17′34″N 1°20′00″E
- Platforms: 2

Other information
- Status: Disused

History
- Pre-grouping: South Eastern & Chatham Railway
- Post-grouping: Southern Railway

Key dates
- 29 June 1918: Opened for military use
- 19 June 1933: Opened to public services
- 11 September 1939: Closed
Location

Richborough Castle Halt was a minor station on the Kent Coast Line named after the nearby Richborough Castle. It opened in 1918 for military use. Public services began in 1933, lasting until 1939 when the halt was closed.

== History ==
Richborough Castle Halt was originally built for military use. It opened on 29 June 1918. The halt had two platforms, one of which was equipped with a shelter. On 19 June 1933, it opened to public services. The halt was closed on 11 September 1939.

Preceding station	Disused railways	Following station
Sandwich	Southern Railway; Kent Coast line	Ebbsfleet and Cliffsend Halt
Sandwich	Southern Railway; Ashford to Ramsgate line	Minster
