= Chartham railway station =

Railway station in Kent, England

Coordinates: 51.257°N 1.018°E

Chartham
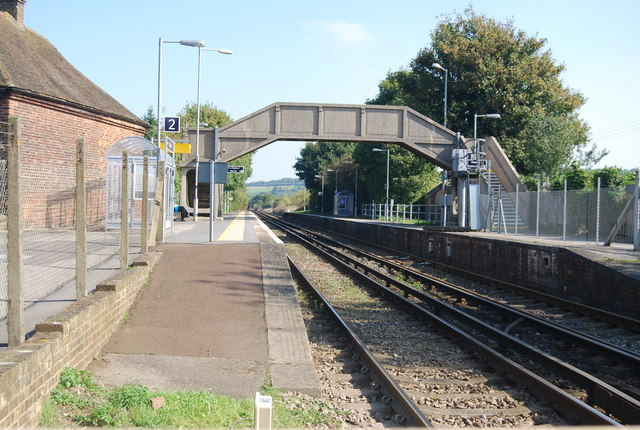

General information
- Location: Chartham, Canterbury; England
- Grid reference: TR107552
- Manager: Southeastern
- Platforms: 2

Other information
- Station code: CRT
- Classification: DfT category F2

History
- Opened: September 1850

Passengers
- 2020/21: ▼21,736
- 2021/22: ▲64,192
- 2022/23: ▲79,814
- 2023/24: ▲86,902
- 2024/25: ▲0.103 million
Location
Notes
- Passenger statistics from the Office of Rail and Road

Chartham railway station is in Chartham, Kent, on the Ashford to Ramsgate line. The station, and all trains serving it, is operated by Southeastern.

== Facilities ==
The station is to the north of Chartham village and south of the A28 road which runs parallel from Ashford to Canterbury. It is unstaffed, but has electronic indicator boards and a ticket machine. There are two platforms, connected by a footbridge. A level crossing at the south end of the station, by the signal box, was formerly manually operated but was replaced with automated crossing gates in December 2022.

== History ==
The station was opened by the South Eastern Railway (SER) in September 1850, some time after the line from Ashford to Canterbury was completed. (Note: Other sources give the opening date for the station as 1859.) In common with several other stations on the line, there was a level crossing as the SER did not believe the line would attract sufficient traffic for bridges.

Goods services were withdrawn from the station on 19 November 1962.

== Incidents ==
At around 06:45 on 9 October 1894, a wagon of hop-pickers on their way to work at Horton Chapel Farm was struck by the delayed 04:15 down Ashford to Canterbury West goods train. Canterbury West goods train. Five hop-pickers were killed instantly, with a further two dying from their injuries later. The investigation found that the wagon driver had left the opening of the gates to children in poor visibility, and had failed to stop before crossing. The train crew whistled at least three times while approaching the crossing. The inspecting officer, Charles Scrope Hutchinson, criticised the South Eastern Railway for the excessively long rostered hours of the train crew. Ultimately, blame was assigned to the wagon driver and the SER was exonerated.

== Services ==
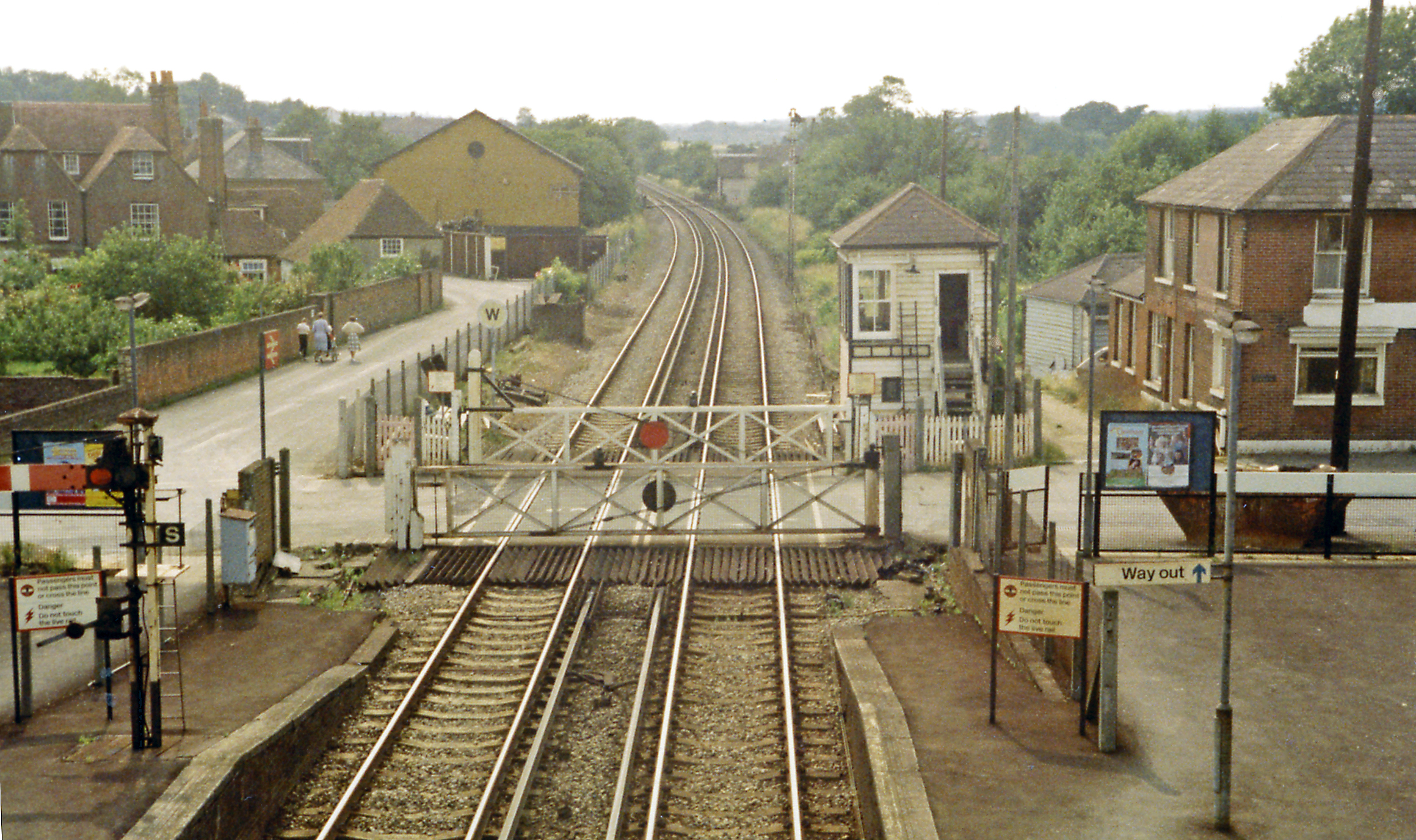
View westward, towards Ashford in 1984

All services at Chartham are operated by Southeastern using Class 375 EMUs.

The typical off-peak service in trains per hour is:

- 1 tph to London Charing Cross via Tonbridge
- 1 tph to Ramsgate

Additional services, including trains to and from London Cannon Street and London St Pancras International call at the station during the peak hours.

Preceding station	National Rail	Following station
Chilham	Southeastern Ashford to Ramsgate Line	Canterbury West
