= Chislet Colliery Halt railway station =

Disused railway station in Kent, England

Chislet Colliery Halt

General information
- Location: Westbere, Kent; England
- Coordinates: 51°18′37″N 1°09′55″E
- Grid reference: TR 198 611
- Platforms: 2

Other information
- Status: Disused

History
- Pre-grouping: South Eastern and Chatham Railway
- Post-grouping: Southern Railway

Key dates
- September 1919: Opened
- 1969: Renamed Chislet Halt
- 4 October 1971: Closed
Location

Chislet Colliery Halt was a minor station on the Ashford to Ramsgate line. It opened in September 1919 and closed in 1971.

== History ==
Chislet Colliery started production in 1919 and halt was opened that year as local housing was inadequate for employees at the colliery. The halt was in the parish of Westbere. There were two platforms initially built of timber but later rebuilt in concrete. In 1961 a signal box was built, it opened on 27 May. Chislet Colliery closed on 25 July 1969, and the halt was renamed Chislet Halt in that year. The halt closed on 4 October 1971. The signal box was permanently switched out on 28 July 1984 and closed on 14 September 1986. As of September 2026 the platforms were still in situ.

Preceding station	Disused railways	Following station
Sturry	British Rail; Southern Region; Ashford to Ramsgate (via Canterbury West) line	Grove Ferry and Upstreet
