= Grove Ferry =

Picnic site in Kent, England

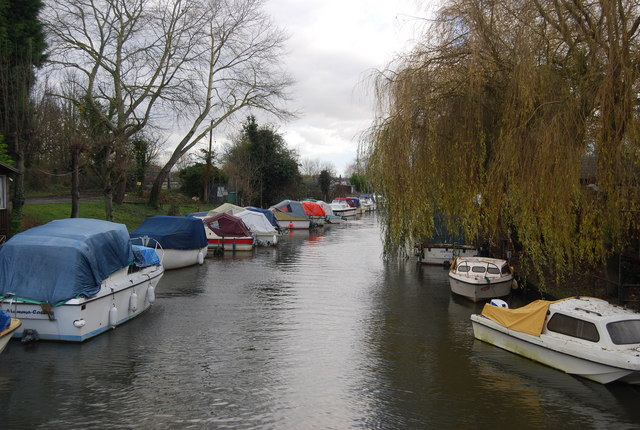
- The River Stour at Grove Ferry

- Location within Kent
- Location: Upstreet, Kent
- Coordinates: 51°19′24″N 1°12′31″E

Grove Ferry is place near Upstreet, Kent, England, on the site of an old hand-drawn ferry that once crossed the River Stour here.

== History ==
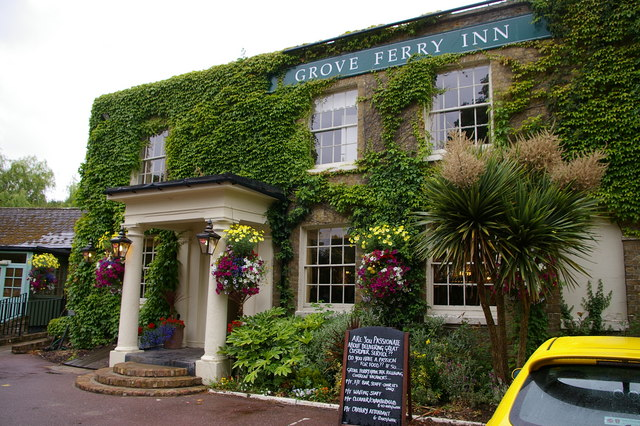
Grove Ferry Inn

The area is named after a hand drawn ferry that crossed the River Stour in front of the building. A road bridge replaced the old ferry in 1966. It has a height clearance of 1.6 metres (5 ft 3 in) for boats.

The Grove Ferry Inn was built as a coaching inn by Edward Epps around 1830, when the ferry formed part of the coaching route from Herne Bay to Dover. It was Grade II listed in 1975. The pub is now managed by Shepherd Neame.

Grove Ferry Boat Club was founded in 1964. The clubhouse, dating from the early seventies, is on the south bank of the river, just below the Grove Ferry Bridge.

Kent County Council renovated the bridge in September 2000. In 2024, a 7.5-tonne (8.3-ton) weight limit was imposed on the bridge.

== Location ==
The bridge is adjacent to a level crossing over the Ashford to Ramsgate line, and the closed and demolished Grove Ferry and Upstreet railway station. The road leads down from to the crossing and then over the bridge, before heading to Grove Hill or Preston.

The picnic site is to the right of the pub car park beside the river. It is a starting point for sections of the long-distance walks; Stour Valley Walk, the Saxon Shore Way or the Wantsum Walks (beside the Wantsum Channel), all that lead beside the River Stour.

Fishing rights were granted during the reign of King Henry II and are still available today along the river bank. Some of the fishing swims (sections of the river where fish are found) have been adapted for those with disabilities. The Canterbury and District Angling Club hold most fishing rights over the River Stour. Subject to an agreement between the association and English Nature.

It is also adjacent to the Stodmarsh National Nature Reserve. The river is part of an area designated as a Site of Special Scientific Interest (SSSI), recently upgraded to an international Ramsar site.
