= Canterbury Parkway railway station =

Proposed railway station in the United Kingdom

Coordinates: 51.276°N 1.063°E

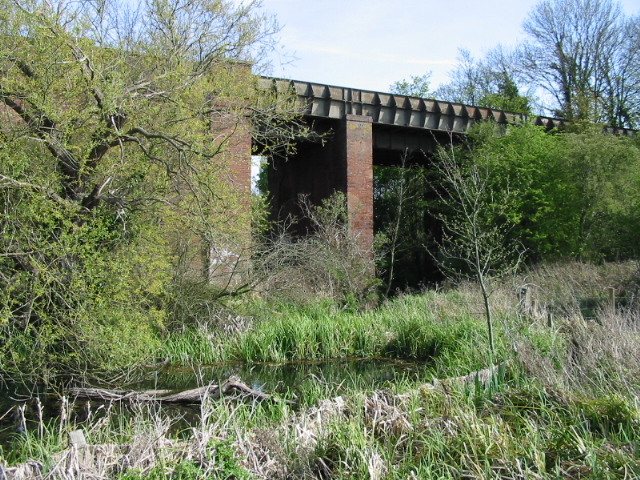
Proposed station site. The Ashford-Ramsgate line is to the right, running underneath the Chatham Main Line.

Canterbury Parkway railway station is a proposed interchange between the Ashford–Ramsgate line and the Chatham Main Line near Canterbury, Kent.

== Location ==
The station would be at the point where the two railways cross at Hambrook Marshes to the southwest of the city centre. Some of the local area is environmentally sensitive marshland and close to the flood plains of the River Stour, though a practical route connecting the station to the main road network has been identified that avoids this. The two lines would remain unconnected, but the station would allow direct transfer between them.

== History ==
The two lines have, for most of their existence, not connected to each other as they were built by separate companies. The line from Ashford to Canterbury West was opened by the South Eastern Railway in 1846, while the line from Faversham to Canterbury East was opened by the rival London, Chatham and Dover Railway in 1860. From 5 May 1918 to 21 November 1924, however, a single-line spur was added to facilitate movements of military traffic to and from Richborough Port, with the track itself remaining in place until 1935. It was reinstated solely for military use between 2 March 1941 and 21 October 1951. As a result of flood damage to the line between Herne Bay and Whistable, a double-track connection was opened on 22 February 1953 in order to carry diverted Thanet services. Regular use of the temporary connection ceased on 21 May 1953 and the spur remained officially usable until 4 March 1956, although track-lifting operations had started in October 1955.

There have been plans to build a station here since the 1980s. These were reviewed by Canterbury MP Rosie Duffield in 2018. As well as acting as an interchange between the two lines, the station would allow commuters to park away from the city centre, and to make it much quicker and practical to travel between Hastings and Ashford, and Whitstable and Faversham. The proposals have been supported by the Campaign to Protect Rural England. Network Rail expressed interest in the station, but said there were no current funding plans for it and construction could be technically challenging. Kent County Council hope that the station would help reduce congestion in the city centre, which they feel is at breaking point.

In 2020, Kent County Council announced the station could cost around £250m and it had shared a pre-feasibility study with Canterbury City Council.
