= Upstreet =

Village in Kent, England

Coordinates: 51.3242°N 1.1978°E

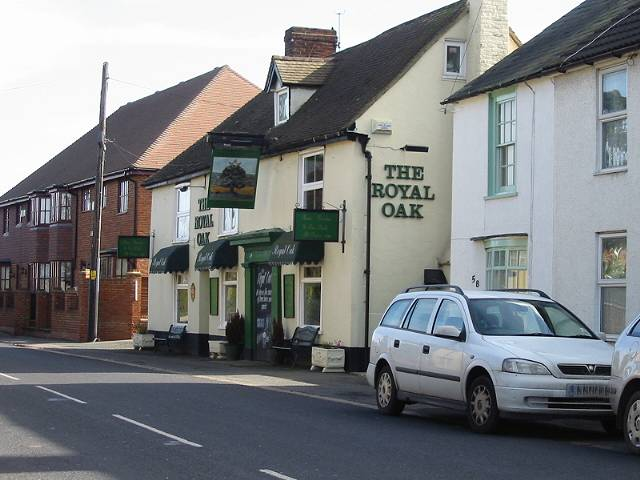
- The Royal Oak pub, Upstreet

- Location within Kent
- OS grid reference: TR2263
- Civil parish: Chislet
- District: City of Canterbury
- Shire county: Kent
- Region: South East
- Country: England
- Sovereign state: United Kingdom
- Police: Kent
- Fire: Kent
- Ambulance: South East Coast
- UK Parliament: Herne Bay and Sandwich

Upstreet is a village in the civil parish of Chislet in Kent, England. It is in the local government district of Canterbury, and the electoral ward of Marshside. It is about 62 miles away from London.

Upstreet is a ribbon development along the A28 road. The majority of houses are new and dating from the 1950s onwards. However, there are a number of older houses such as the Grade II listed building 'Grove Court' or the Grade I listed 'Upstreet Farmhouse', which was built in the 16th century and stands in an acre of its own land. It had notable different purposes over the years and is known to be haunted. Also listed are 'Hamilton's' and 'The Vision House' (No89 and No94).

Upstreet was mentioned in the 1830s Swing Riots, when a widespread uprising by agricultural workers in southern and eastern England occurred, in protest at agricultural mechanisation and harsh working conditions. Several fires were carried at different farms as part of the protests.

Close to Upstreet is the Stodmarsh National Nature Reserve and the River Stour at Grove Ferry.. Also the Saxon Shore Way (long-distance footpath) also passes the village between Chislet and Stourmouth.

Upstreet has a few services (a shop, two elderly care homes, one pub and one car sales lot), the garage having closed through 2015. The number of services is declining due to rising car ownership. For example, 45 years ago there was a railway station, haberdashery, greengrocer's, butcher's, baker's etc. However now there is no railway station and the shop consolidates the uses of a post office, greengrocer's, haberdashery, baker's, butcher's, etc. all under one roof. The main public transport in Upstreet is the buses, with the central bus stop being the Post Office Bus Stop, offering routes to Canterbury as frequently as every 15 minutes.

The pub is worked at by many of the locals, including a few teenagers from the village, most notably waitress Moon, and is owned by another of the locals. There is a karaoke machine and jukebox, and a quiz night on Thursdays at 8 PM. The pub is a main place where locals from Sturry to Minster can all socialise, and catch up. The pub remained open through COVID-19 restrictions.

One of the houses was also featured on Homes Under the Hammer.
