= Canterbury West railway station =

Railway station in Kent, England

Coordinates: 51°17′2.63″N 1°4′31.37″E

Canterbury West
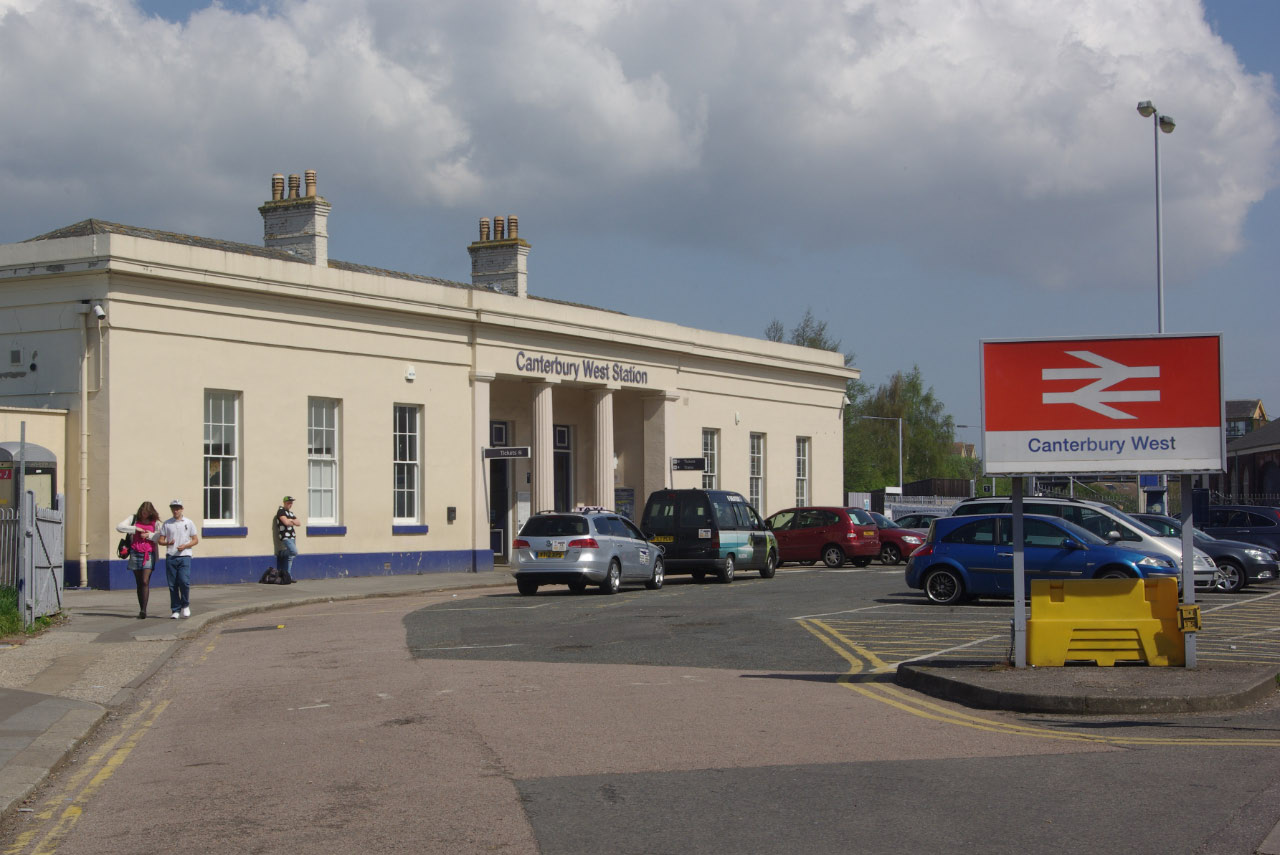

General information
- Location: Canterbury, Canterbury; England
- Grid reference: TR145583
- Manager: Southeastern
- Platforms: 2

Other information
- Station code: CBW
- Classification: DfT category D

History
- Opened: 6 February 1846

Passengers
- 2020/21: ▼0.652 million
- Interchange: ▼31,425
- 2021/22: ▲1.794 million
- Interchange: ▲79,889
- 2022/23: ▲2.177 million
- Interchange: ▲0.146 million
- 2023/24: ▲2.465 million
- Interchange: ▲0.168 million
- 2024/25: ▲2.724 million
- Interchange: ▼0.158 million

Listed Building – Grade II
- Feature: Canterbury West Station
- Designated: 7 September 1973
- Reference no.: 1242649

Listed Building – Grade II
- Feature: Overhead Signal Box
- Designated: 10 March 1986
- Reference no.: 1258154
Location
Notes
- Passenger statistics from the Office of Rail and Road

Canterbury West railway station is a Grade II listed railway station, and the busier of the two stations in Canterbury in Kent, England. The station, as well as all services, are operated by Southeastern with both main line and high speed trains serving the station.

The station and its line was built by the South Eastern Railway and opened in 1846. It was the first mainline station in Canterbury, while the later Canterbury East was built by the London, Chatham & Dover Railway. There was also a connection to the Canterbury and Whitstable Railway, the first railway in Kent, and later to the Elham Valley Railway; these have both since closed.

== Location ==
The station is north of Westgate and St Dunstans level crossing.

Canterbury West is approximately 1/2 mile (0.8 km) to the north of Canterbury’s other station, Canterbury East. Both stations are located due west of Canterbury’s city centre; in fact, despite their names, the two stations lie on almost the same line of longitude.

== History ==
=== South Eastern Railway ===
The South Eastern Railway (SER) was authorised by an Act of Parliament to construct a railway to Canterbury in June 1836. Local residents were generally opposed to the plan as the SER's lines did not go in the direction that they wanted, and the city was not central to the company's overall aims. They were ignored and construction started anyway, but the rival London, Chatham & Dover Railway (LCDR) decided to promote a line from Chatham to Margate and Ramsgate in response.

The station opened on 6 February 1846 when the SER began services to Ashford. It was originally called simply Canterbury as it was the only mainline station in the city at that time. A special excursion train ran on the opening date, but was delayed owing to a breakdown at Tonbridge.

Following the opening of another Canterbury station by the LCDR on 9 July 1860, it was renamed to Canterbury West on 1 July 1889 to avoid confusion.

Two months later on 13 April 1846, services were extended to Ramsgate, and to Whitstable after conversion of the Canterbury and Whitstable Railway and closure of the Canterbury North Lane terminus. The station was built with two central through tracks and three platforms, one for the Whitstable branch.

The signalling was upgraded in 1874 at a cost of £1,350 as part of general upgrades along the line. The subway was added in April 1877 after the connecting footbridge had been damaged after strong gales.

In October 1878, the SER appealed to the LCDR that they should find a way of integrating the city's two stations, or providing a joint one somewhere else.

On 1 July 1889 the Elham Valley Railway reached Canterbury from Folkestone and at this time the run-in boards read Canterbury (SER) Change for Whitstable and Elham Valley Line.

=== Later history ===
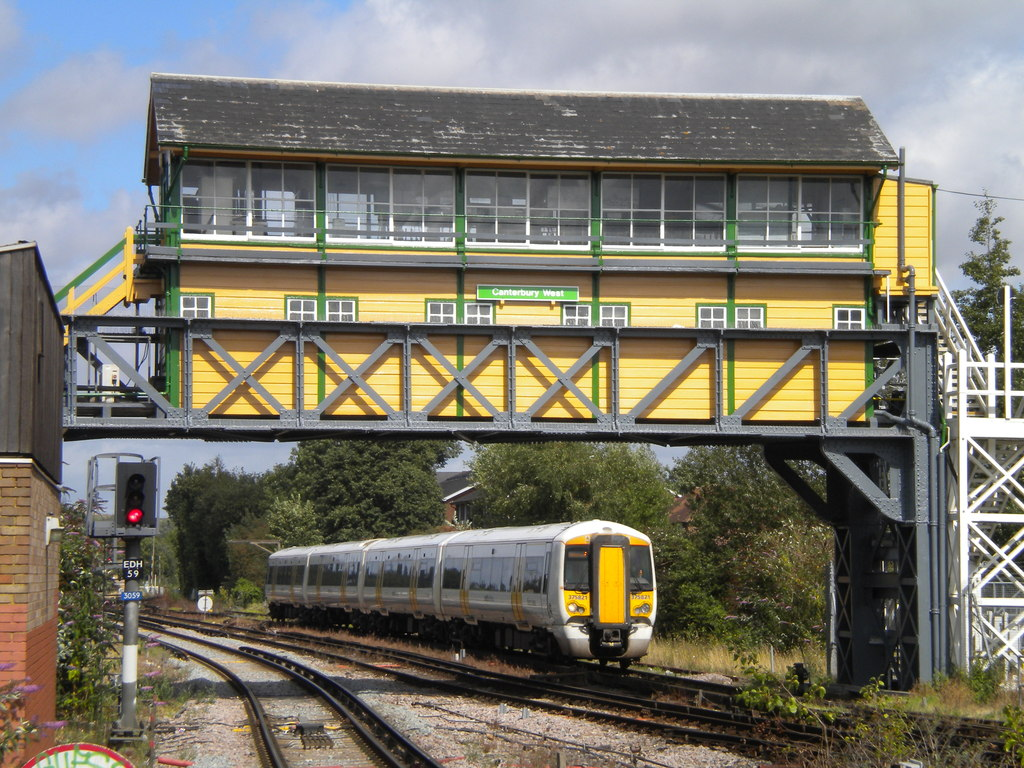
Canterbury West signal box

The Whitstable branch closed to passenger traffic on 1 January 1931, and traffic from the Elham Valley into Canterbury ceased from 25 October 1940 when the line was requisitioned by the Army. Following the Southern Region Kent Coast Electrification Scheme, Phase 2 electric services started on 18 June 1962. The central through tracks were removed in 1979. Goods services were withdrawn on 31 December 1986.

In 1973 the station buildings were Grade II listed by English Heritage. The signal box was also listed Grade II in 1986.

High Speed services to London St Pancras via High Speed 1 began serving Canterbury West on 7 September 2009, with the full service commencing on 13 December, significantly reducing journey times to London.

In 2010, the railway station was refurbished to improve the station's accessibility. Funded by the Department for Transport's Access for All Scheme, the main change was the construction of a new footbridge allowing a step-free route between the station entrance and both platforms using two lifts. Other improvements include new tactile paving along the edge of the platform, new toilet facilities, new customer information screens and lighting, the redecoration of the ticket office and changes to the car park layout.

In December 2013, a £535,000 upgrade to the station's forecourt and car park was completed.

== Future ==
The former rivalry between the SER and LCDR meant there is no easy way to change between Canterbury East and West. A proposal for a Canterbury Parkway station, at the place the two lines cross, has been intermittently suggested since the 1980s. In 2018, local MP Rosie Duffield suggested the new station would be a better alternative to a new multi-story car park for Canterbury West, which opened in June 2020.

== Layout ==
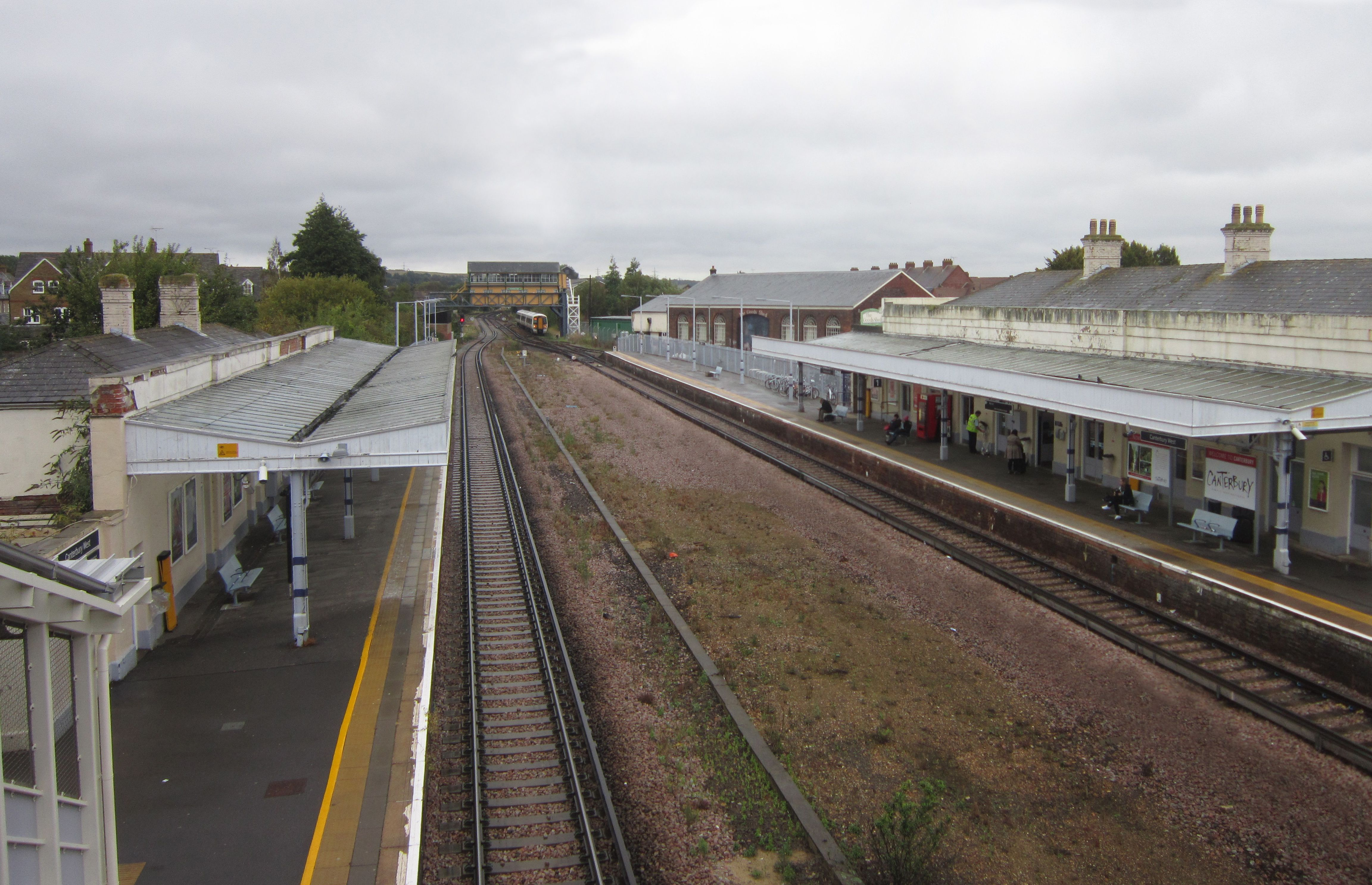
Canterbury West platforms

Platform 1 serves stations to Ashford and London. The main station buildings are on this side, and have been covered with corrugated iron since their 1846 construction. There is a recessed part of the building in the centre with two Doric order fluted columns and pilasters; this is flanked by two storeys and three windows either side. Platform 2 serves Ramsgate and Margate. The platforms are connected both by an overbridge and a subway.

Platform 1 houses the main ticket office – there are two counters and three self-service machines, plus a cafe and public toilets. Both platforms have waiting rooms.

== Services ==
All services at Canterbury West are operated by Southeastern using Class 375 and 395 EMUs.

The typical off-peak service in trains per hour is:

- 1 tph to London Charing Cross via Tonbridge
- 1 tph to London St Pancras International
- 1 tph to Ramsgate (stopping)
- 1 tph to Margate (semi-fast)

Additional services, including trains to and from London Cannon Street call at the station during the peak hours.

Preceding station	National Rail	Following station
Chartham	Southeastern Ashford to Ramsgate Line	Sturry
Ashford International	Southeastern High Speed 1	Thanet Parkway
	Disused railways	
Terminus	British Rail Southern Region Canterbury and Whitstable Railway	Blean & Tyler Hill Halt
Terminus	Southern Railway Elham Valley Railway	Canterbury South

== Incidents ==
On 28 December 1874, two men were injured when they fell off the platform in front of an oncoming train. One was killed instantly, and the other required a leg to be amputated. On 23 November the following year, a guard was killed after being trapped between the buffers while on duty for shunting trains.

On 1 January 1877, the station roof was damaged following bad weather.

On 26 July 1884, several people were injured after a gas explosion at the station.
