= Kent Coast line =

Railway line in Kent, England

Kent Coast Line
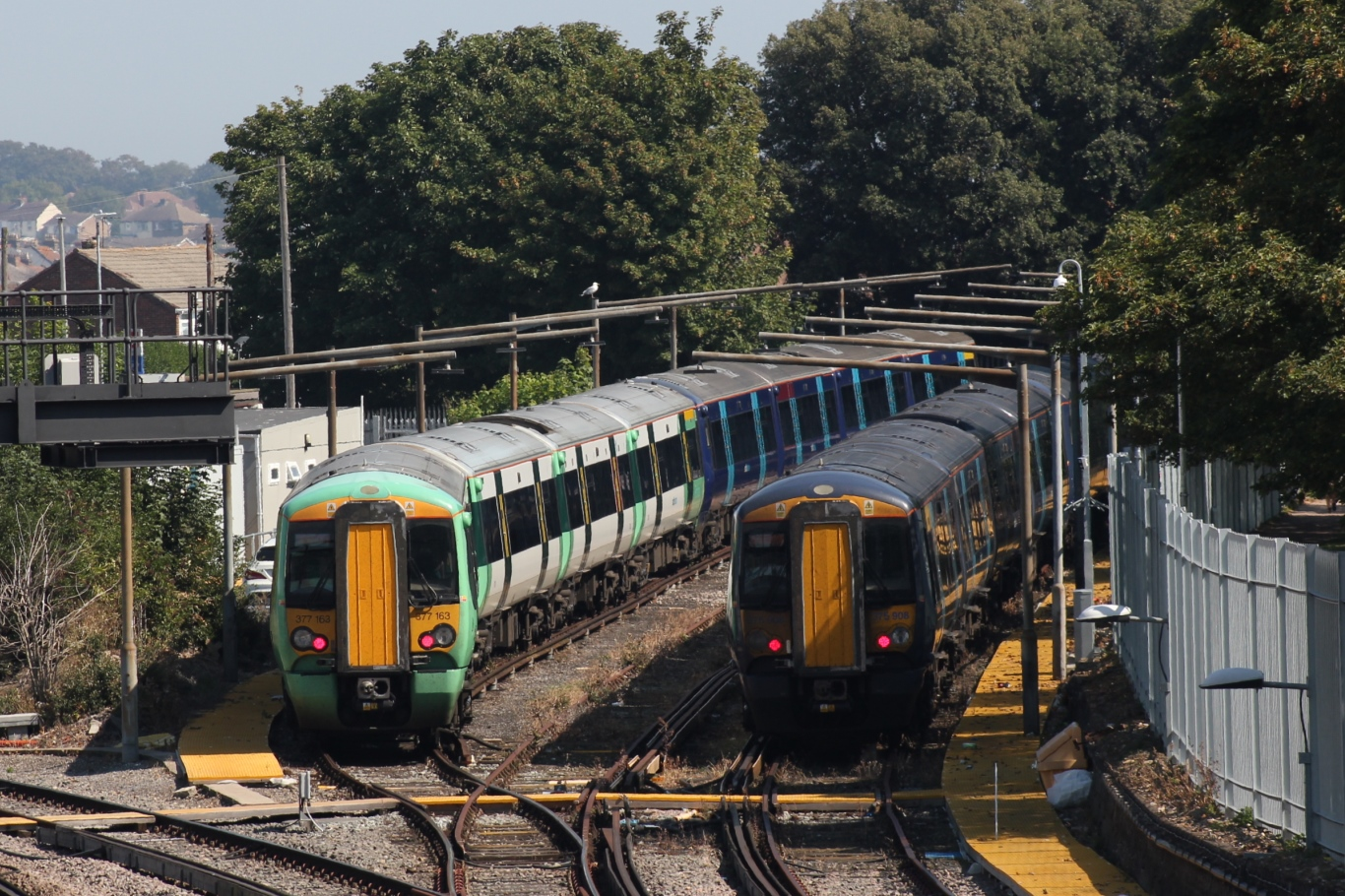
- Southeastern EMUs at Ramsgate in 2019

Overview
- Status: Operational
- Owner: Network Rail
- Locale: Kent; South East England

Service
- Type: Suburban rail, Heavy rail
- System: National Rail
- Operator(s): Southeastern
- Rolling stock: Class 375; Class 395; Class 465 (peak hours and a few summer services only); Class 466 (peak hours and a few summer services only)

Technical
- Line length: 16mi 64ch (27.03 km)
- Track gauge: 1,435 mm (4 ft 8 1/2 in) standard gauge
Route map
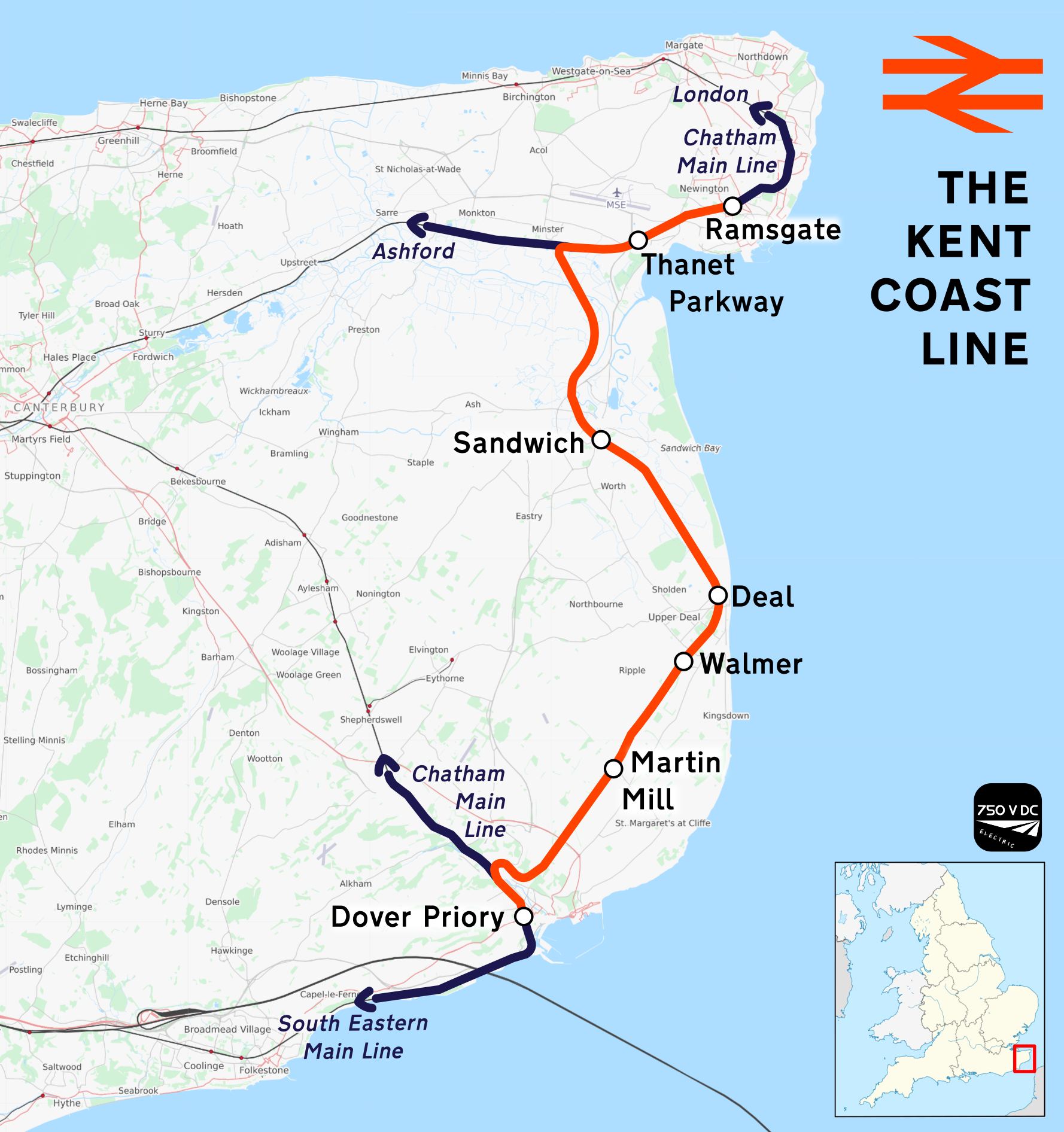
(Click to expand)

The Kent Coast Line is the railway line that runs from Minster East Junction to Buckland Jn connecting Ramsgate and Dover Priory in the English county of Kent.

It was electrified (750 V DC third rail) by BR under the 1955 Modernisation Plan.

== Services ==
As of November 2021, the off-peak service is operated as an extension of the South Eastern Main Line service from Charing Cross to Dover Priory. Trains run hourly terminating at Ramsgate. Services are operated by Southeastern using class 375 units. Some peak trains use Cannon Street or are High Speed 1 services to or from London St. Pancras or the Class 465/466 Networkers are also used in the peak hours or in the summer timetable services from London Cannon Street extended to Ramsgate via Greenwich, Woolwich Arsenal and Dartford.

During the late 2010s, the entire off-peak service was run as part of the High Speed domestic service, running in a loop around the coast with trains at both ends continuing towards St. Pancras via Ashford International and Faversham. This service was ended after the COVID pandemic massively reduced rail use.

A small number of the peak services run to Minster on the Ashford to Ramsgate line before reversing back onto the coast line as a school service, running Ramsgate-Minster-Sandwich-Deal in the mornings and the reverse in the evenings.

== History ==
Dover and Deal Railway Act 1874
- Act of Parliament
- Parliament of the United Kingdom
- Long title: An Act to authorise the Construction of Railways between Dover and Deal; and for other purposes.
- Citation: 37 & 38 Vict. c. lii

Dates
- Royal assent: 30 June 1874

Text of statute as originally enacted

Dover and Deal Railway Act 1877
- Act of Parliament
- Parliament of the United Kingdom
- Long title: An Act to extend the periods respectively limited by "Dover and Deal Railway Act, 1874," for the compulsory purchase of Lands, and for the completion of the Works by that Act authorised.
- Citation: 40 & 41 Vict. c. ccxxxi

Dates
- Royal assent: 14 August 1877

Text of statute as originally enacted

Dover and Deal Railway Act 1878
- Act of Parliament
- Parliament of the United Kingdom
- Long title: An Act to extend the period limited by the Dover and Deal Railway Act, 1874, as extended by the Dover and Deal Railway Act, 1877, for the compulsory purchase of Lands authorised to be taken by the first-mentioned Act.
- Citation: 41 & 42 Vict. c. clxxxvi

Dates
- Royal assent: 22 July 1878

Text of statute as originally enacted

Dover and Deal Railway Act 1879
- Act of Parliament
- Parliament of the United Kingdom
- Long title: An Act to extend the periods limited for the compulsory purchase of lands for, and for the completion of, the Dover and Deal Railway.
- Citation: 42 & 43 Vict. c. v

Dates
- Royal assent: 23 May 1879

Text of statute as originally enacted

The South Eastern Railway's (SER) first main line went to Dover via Folkestone and Ashford. The SER Ashford to Margate Broadstairs and Ramsgate (via Canterbury West) line was then extended south to Deal. In 1881 this was linked up by the Dover and Deal Railway with their bitter rival the London, Chatham and Dover Railway (LCDR).

1. A railway one furlong five chains and nine yards in length, commencing by a junction with the South-eastern Railway near the Archcliff Fort Tunnel in the parish of Hougham, and terminating in the parish of Saint Mary the Virgin, Dover, by a junction with the Admiralty Pier Railway or tramway of the London, Chatham, and Dover Railway;
2. A railway eight miles two furlongs and eight chains in length, commencing by a junction with the London, Chatham, and Dover Railway in the parish of Buckland, and terminating by a junction with the South-eastern Railway at Deal.
— Section 4, Dover and Deal Railway Act 1874 (37 & 38 Vict. c. lii)

Upon the joint management of the SER and LCDR in 1899 the track layout at Ashford was rationalised, with Thanet receiving similar treatment (by Southern) in the 1920s.

The line was electrified under the BR 1955 Modernisation Plan, in "Kent Coast Electrification (Stage 2)" opening January 1961.

The building of the railway was significant in the development of seaside resorts like Broadstairs.

== Dover track layout ==
The Railway Clearing House produced a map that shows the complex layout of this area. This shows the separate connection to the pier where trains used to board ferries.
