= Ramsgate railway station =

Railway station in Kent, England

Ramsgate
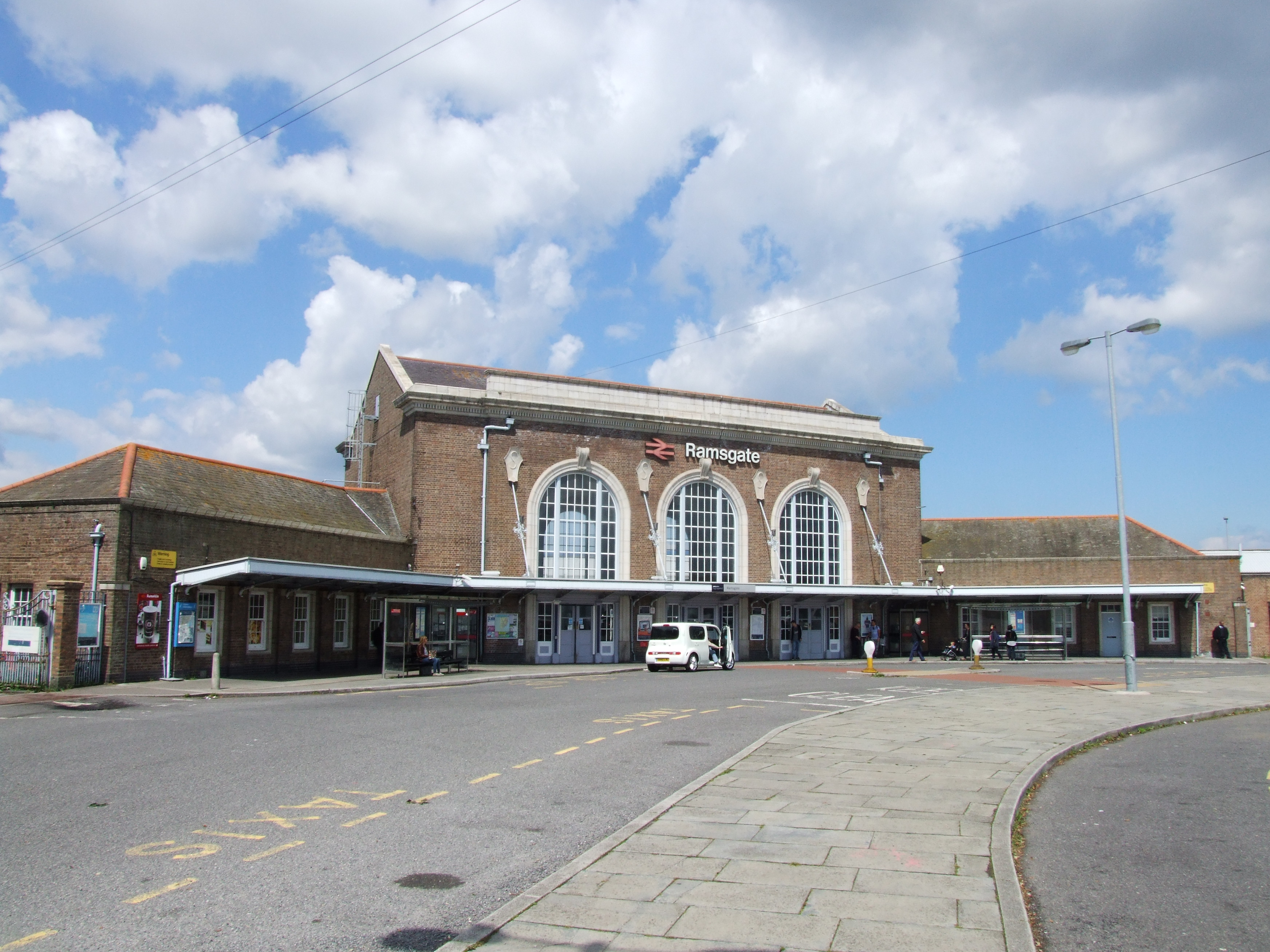

General information
- Location: Ramsgate, District of Thanet; England
- Grid reference: TR371657
- Manager: Southeastern
- Platforms: 4

Other information
- Station code: RAM
- Classification: DfT category D

History
- Opened: 2 July 1926

Passengers
- 2020/21: ▼0.417 million
- Interchange: ▼22,090
- 2021/22: ▲1.007 million
- Interchange: ▲60,432
- 2022/23: ▲1.152 million
- Interchange: ▲0.134 million
- 2023/24: ▲1.289 million
- Interchange: ▲0.153 million
- 2024/25: ▲1.376 million
- Interchange: ▲0.186 million

Listed Building – Grade II
- Feature: Ramsgate Station
- Designated: 4 February 1988 (amended 11 July 2000)
- Reference no.: 1086060
Location
Notes
- Passenger statistics from the Office of Rail and Road

Ramsgate railway station serves the town of Ramsgate in Thanet in Kent, England. The station lies on the Chatham Main Line, 79 miles 21 chains (127.6 km) down the line from London Victoria, the Kent Coast Line, and the Ashford to Ramsgate (via Canterbury West) line. The station is managed by Southeastern, which (including Southeastern High Speed) operates all trains serving it. The building is Grade II listed.

== History ==
Trains first reached Ramsgate in April 1846 when the South Eastern Railway (SER) opened a line from Canterbury. It terminated at Ramsgate SER, later to be called Ramsgate Town, which, unlike the present-day station, was in the town centre. Later the same year the line opened across Thanet to Margate, to Margate SER (later Margate Sands). Trains from Canterbury to Margate had to reverse at Ramsgate Town; a chord was built bypassing the station, but not often used. St Lawrence station was opened in 1864 just before this chord, but closed in 1916.

The London Chatham & Dover Railway (LCDR) reached Margate from Herne Bay in 1863. This called at Margate LC&DR (later Margate West), East Margate (later Margate East), Broadstairs, and via a 1630 yd tunnel terminated at Ramsgate LC&DR (later Ramsgate Harbour), near the harbour and beach.

This arrangement was inherited by Southern Railway on grouping in 1923. In 1926 a new line was opened connecting the SER line from east of Ramsgate Town to the LCDR line just south of Broadstairs. The current Ramsgate station and a new station at Dumpton Park were built on this new line, and the station was opened on 2 July 1926. The Ramsgate Harbour station, line through the tunnel, and the Ramsgate Town station and old SER line across to Margate Sands were all closed in July 1926. This change made for operational convenience, but has the disadvantage that the town centre is no longer served.

=== Motive power depot ===
The SER opened a motive power depot near Ramsgate Station in April 1846. This was closed by the Southern Railway in 1926 and replaced by a larger facility in 1930. This closed to steam locomotives in 1959 and was converted for use servicing electric multiple units introduced by the Southern Region following the British Railways Kent Coast Electrification.

The depot (51.3421°N 1.4018°E) was modernised in 2007 and opened in late 2008.

== Services ==
All services at Ramsgate are operated by Southeastern using Class 375, 465 and 395 EMUs.

The typical off-peak service in trains per hour is:

- 3 tph to London St Pancras International (1 of these runs via Canterbury West, 1 runs via Dover Priory and 1 runs via Chatham)
- 1 tph to London Charing Cross via Canterbury West and Tonbridge
- 1 tph to London Victoria via Chatham
- 1 tph to Margate

Additional services, including trains to and from London Cannon Street call at the station during the peak hours.

| Preceding station | National Rail | Following station |
|---|---|---|
| Dumpton Park | Southeastern Chatham Main Line - Ramsgate Branch | Terminus |
| Sandwich | Southeastern Kent Coast Line | Terminus |
| Thanet Parkway | Southeastern Ashford to Ramsgate Line | Terminus |
| Thanet Parkway | Southeastern High Speed 1 | Broadstairs |

== Connections ==
The station is situated in the northern Ramsgate parish of St Lawrence, a 10-minute walk away from Ramsgate town centre. The "Loop" bus service, operated by Stagecoach South East, connects the station with Ramsgate town centre and nearby Thanet settlements, including those not served by rail such as Westwood.
