= Ashford–Ramsgate line =

Railway line in Kent, England

Ashford–Ramsgate
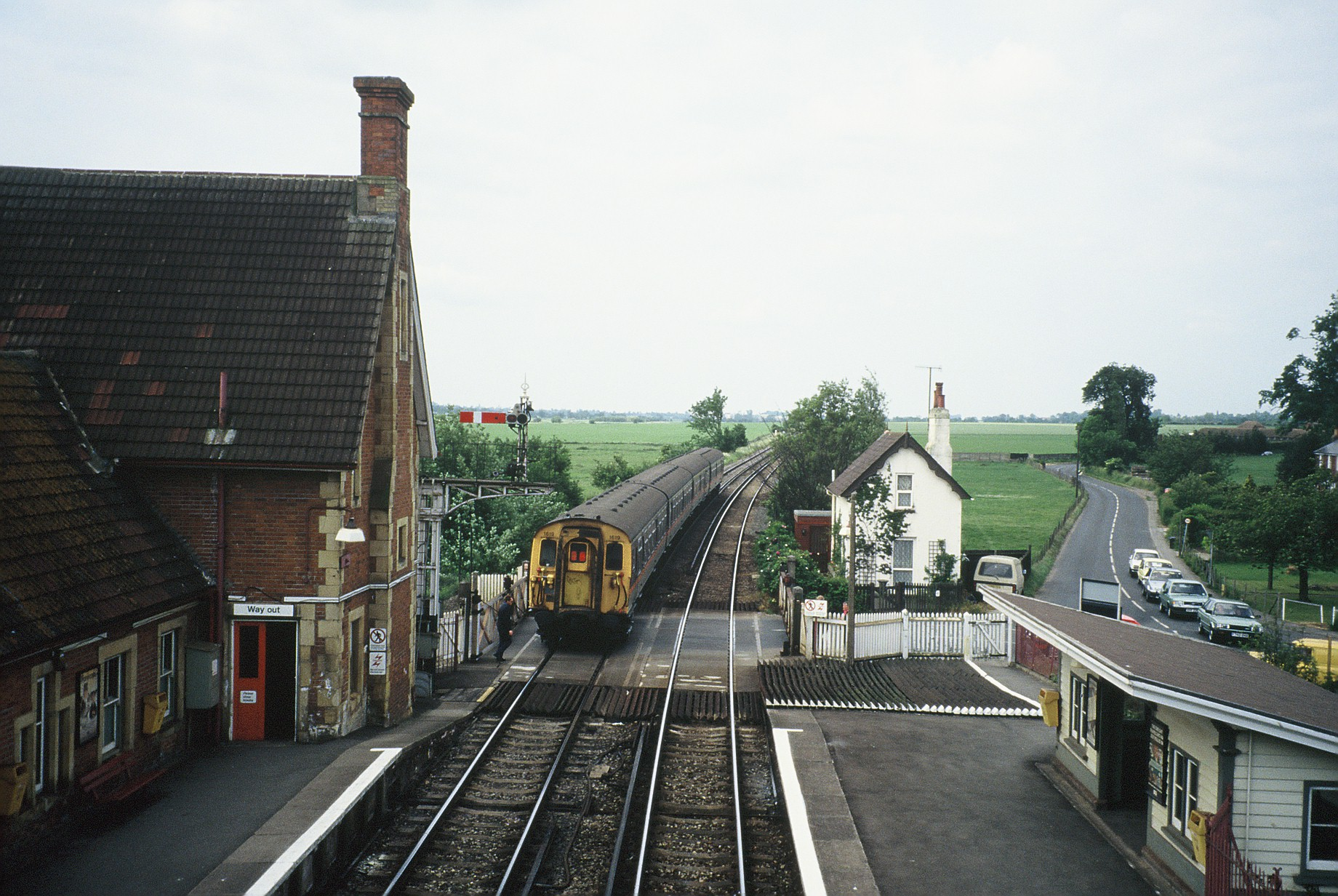
- Class 411 1619 with a 4-car set in Jaffa Cake livery leaves Wye station in 1989

Overview
- Status: Operational
- Owner: Network Rail
- Locale: Kent, South East England
- Stations: 11

Service
- Type: Heavy rail
- System: National Rail
- Operator(s): Southeastern
- Rolling stock: Class 375 "Electrostar", Class 395 "Javelin"

Technical
- Line length: 29mi 39ch (47.45 km)
- Number of tracks: 2
- Track gauge: 4 ft 8 1/2 in (1,435 mm) standard gauge
Route map
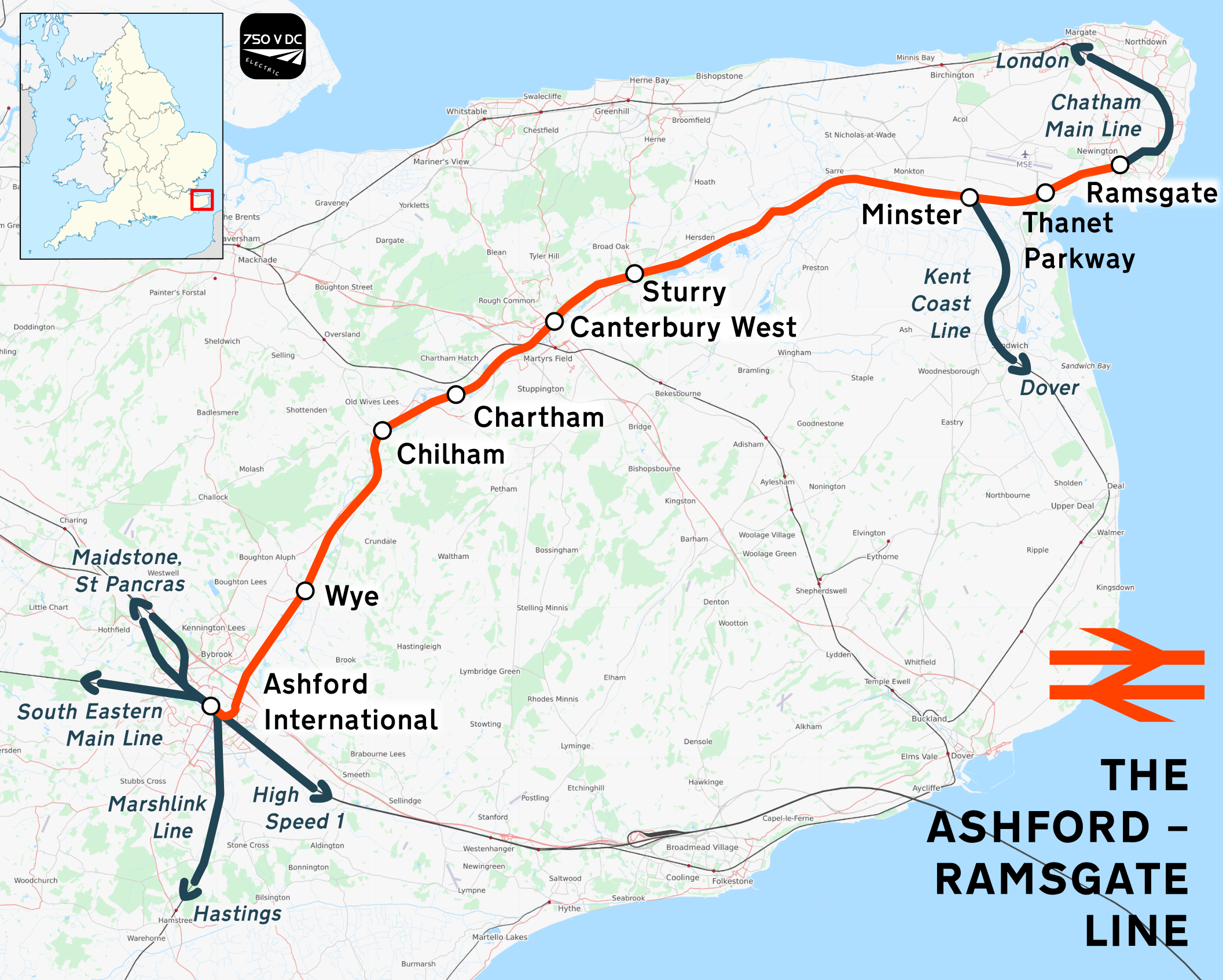
(Click to expand)

The Ashford–Ramsgate line is a railway that runs through Kent from Ashford to Ramsgate via Canterbury West. Its route mostly follows the course of the River Great Stour.

The line was opened in 1846 by the South Eastern Railway (SER). The SER's route included reversing at Ramsgate to take a branch line to Margate Sands; this section closed in the 1920s as part of a rationalisation to merge duplicate routes built by the SER and its former competitor the London, Chatham and Dover Railway (LCDR). The remainder of the line is double-track and electrified with 750 V DC third rail. At Ashford it links to High Speed 1 for fast services to St Pancras International.

== Services ==
Services are operated by Southeastern. As of November 2021, the typical off-peak down service per hour is:

- One high-speed service from London St. Pancras International towards Margate, stopping at Stratford International, Ebbsfleet International, Ashford International and Canterbury West.
- One service from London Charing Cross via Tonbridge and Ashford to Ramsgate, stopping at all stations; changing at Ashford is generally faster than using this service to and from London

A small number of peak services on the Kent Coast line run onto the Ashford to Ramsgate line at Minster and then reverse as a school service, running Ramsgate–Minster–Sandwich–Deal (mornings) or the reverse (evenings).

== History ==
The line was proposed by the South Eastern Railway (SER) as a branch from its main line in April 1834. At the time, coastal towns on the Isle of Thanet such as Margate and Ramsgate were undergoing a rise in popularity as holiday resorts, and railways could be seen as faster and cheaper rivals to the steamboat traffic bringing holidaymakers from London. However, the SER suffered from having no direct access to Thanet on their network except via Ashford. By August 1836, the rival London, Chatham and Dover Railway (LCDR) made its own proposal to serve Thanet. Planning for the line stalled for a while, but by 1840 the SER realised that rival railways were making serious proposals for lines to Thanet.

The SER were not convinced the railway would be a success, and so built it as single track, with space to add an additional track if necessary, and crossed roads at level in several places, including Wye, Chartham and Sturry. The line ran through Minster to Ramsgate, then doubled back on a branch line to Margate Sands, which required trains reversing. The overall planned cost was £385,339.

The line opened as far as Canterbury on 6 February 1846. Intermediate stations were not immediately provided, but opened soon afterwards; Wye railway station was open by April 1846. A station was planned at Godmersham but then cancelled. The extension to Ramsgate opened on 13 April, with stations at Grove Ferry, Minster and Ramsgate. The SER hoped by building the line to Ramsgate, it would be able to run boat train services to Ostend. The Margate branch was delayed and finally opened on 1 December 1846. An intermediate station at Sturry opened on 22 April 1847.

The goods and cattle facilities at Ramsgate made the line popular for transporting these, and they were extended in 1895. An additional siding was added at Wye in 1895 to serve racing traffic.

After the LCDR's line reached Dover on 22 July 1861, there was serious competition between the two companies for continental port traffic. The rivalry between the SER and LDCR almost bankrupted both companies, and consequently they formed a joined management committee, known as the South Eastern and Chatham Railway (SECR), in 1899. This then became part of the Southern Railway (SR) as part of the grouping under the Railways Act 1921. In 1924, a 1.5-mile (2.4 km) extension began construction between the former SER line at Ramsgate and the former LCDR line at Dumpton Park. This opened on 2 July 1926. At the same time, the former SER branch to Margate Sands closed to passengers, as did the stations at Ramsgate Town and Ramsgate Harbour. The Margate Sands branch line survived as a goods depot until November 1976, when it was closed completely.

The line was electrified in 1961 under the BR 1955 Modernisation Plan. Grove Ferry station closed on 3 January 1966.

== Accidents and incidents ==
On 11 August 1858, an excursion train was derailed near Chilham. Three people were killed.

On 1 January 1877, a major storm hit Kent, causing damage along the line. The roof at Canterbury West was damaged, and a timber bridge across the line blew down. The bridge was replaced three months later by a subway.

On 9 October 1894, an early morning goods train carrying hop pickers from Ashford to Canterbury West collided with a horse and cart on a level crossing close to Horton Chapel Farm. Five people were killed immediately, and two later died from their injuries. The SER denied responsibility and blamed the cart driver who did not check to see if a train was coming.

On 15 July 1970, an electric multiple unit was in collision with a lorry on an occupation crossing between Chartham and Chilham due to an error by the crossing keeper. The driver of the lorry and the guard of the train were killed.

On 26 July 2015, electric multiple unit 375 703 was in collision with a herd of cattle on the line at Chilham and was derailed. There were no injuries amongst the 70 passengers. The line was closed until 30 July.
