= Tonbridge railway station =

Railway station in Kent, England

Tonbridge
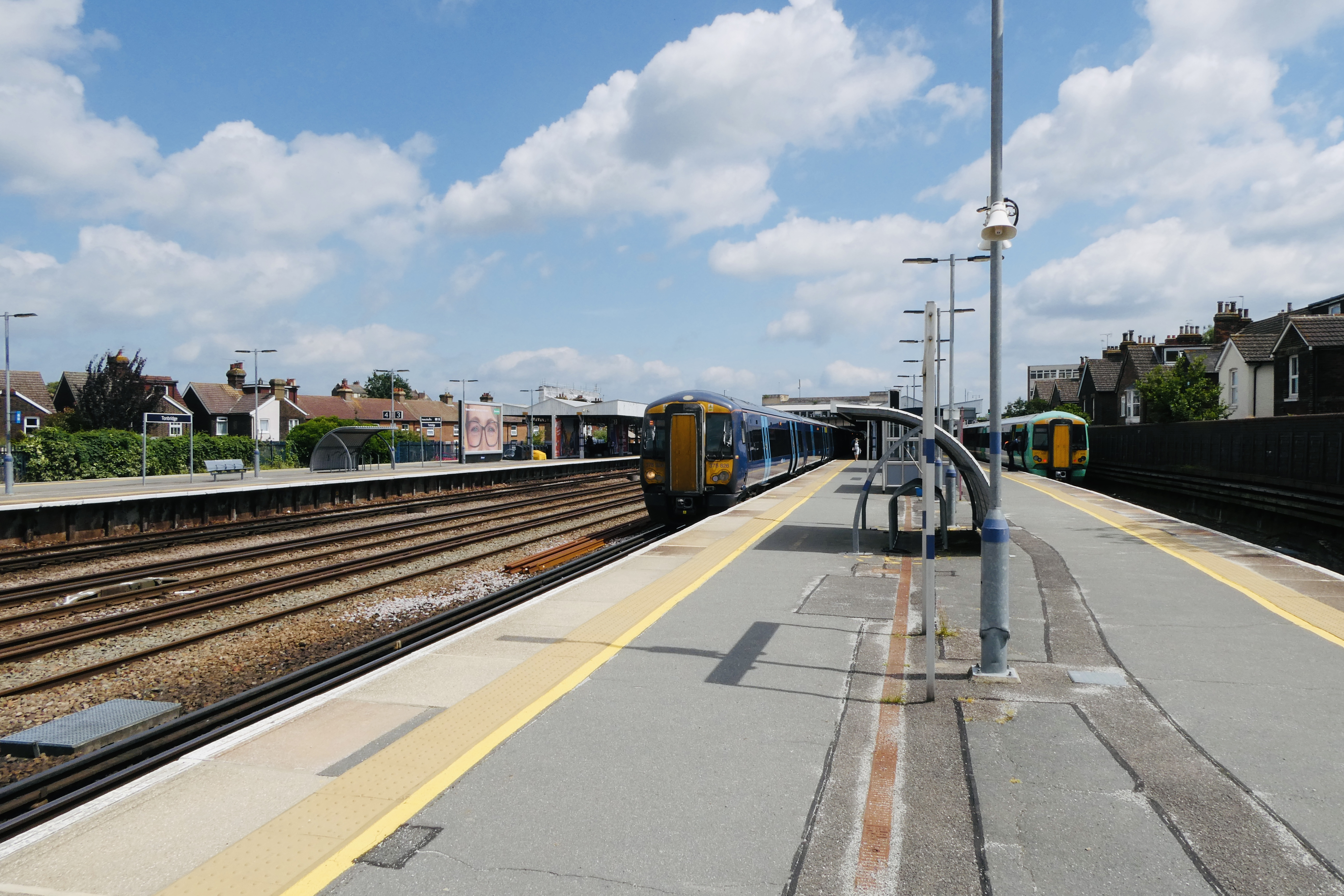
- Southeastern and Southern services at Tonbridge, looking east in 2021

General information
- Location: Tonbridge, Borough of Tonbridge and Malling; England
- Coordinates: 51.191°N 0.271°E
- Grid reference: TQ586460
- Manager: Southeastern
- Platforms: 4

Other information
- Station code: TON
- Classification: DfT category B

Key dates
- 26 May 1842: Opened as Tunbridge
- January 1852: Renamed Tunbridge Junction
- 1864: Resited 310 yards (280 m) west
- May 1893: Renamed Tonbridge Junction
- July 1929: Renamed Tonbridge

Passengers
- 2020/21: ▼1.210 million
- Interchange: ▼0.114 million
- 2021/22: ▲2.986 million
- Interchange: ▲0.299 million
- 2022/23: ▲3.503 million
- Interchange: ▲0.322 million
- 2023/24: ▲3.758 million
- Interchange: ▲0.367 million
- 2024/25: ▲4.048 million
- Interchange: ▲0.481 million
Location
Notes
- Passenger statistics from the Office of Rail and Road

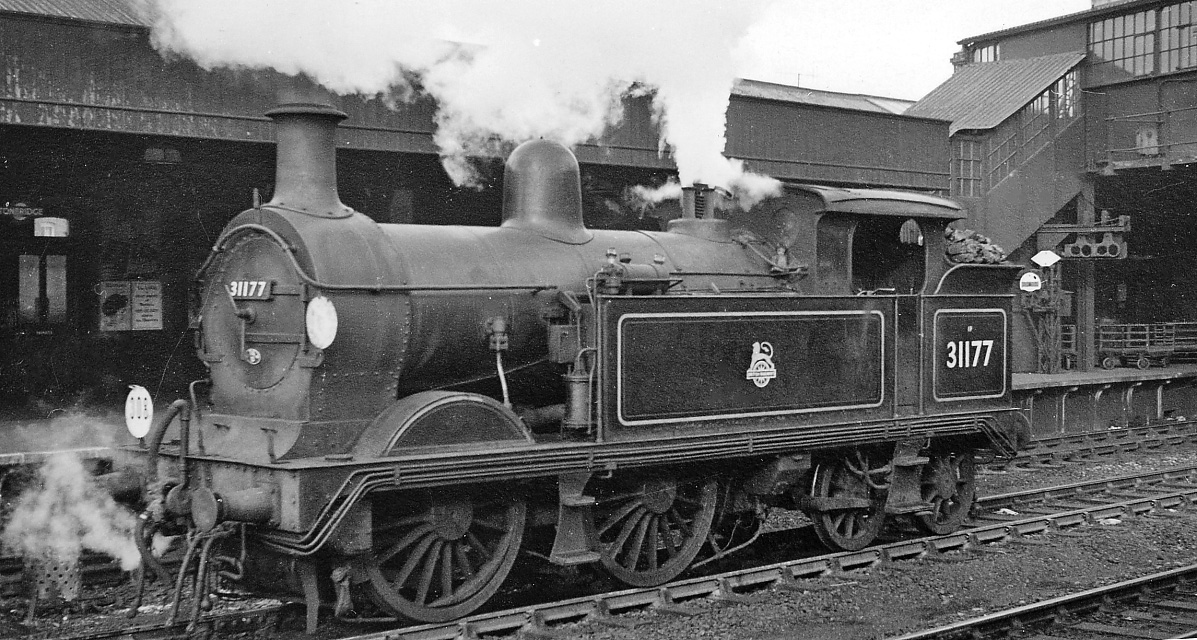
Auto-fitted ex-SE&CR 0-4-4T in 1958

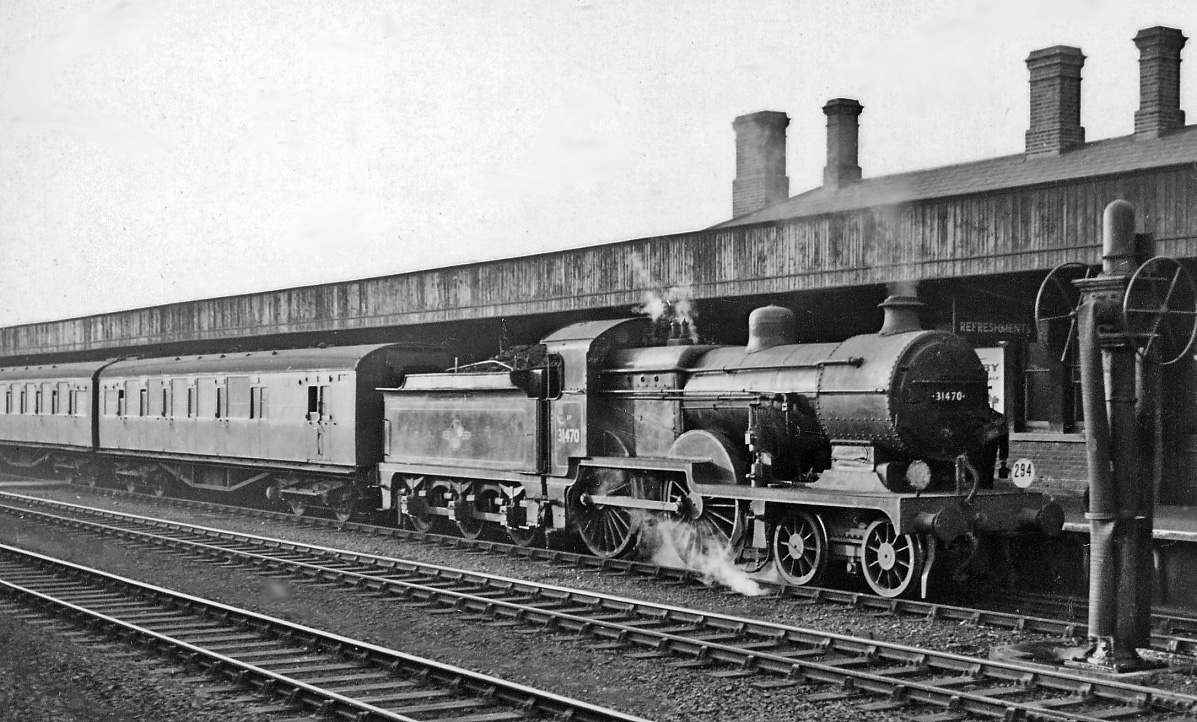
Down stopping train from Redhill in 1958

Tonbridge railway station is on the South Eastern Main Line in England, serving the town of Tonbridge, Kent. It is 29 miles 46 chains (47.6 km) from London Charing Cross via Sevenoaks. Trains calling at the station are operated by Southeastern and Southern.

Tonbridge forms a junction between the South Eastern Main Line, the Hastings Line and the Redhill–Tonbridge line. There are four platforms. Platform 4 is a terminating platform.

There are extensive yards and storage sidings on both the east and west sides of the station.

== History ==
The South Eastern Railway (SER) first reached Tonbridge (then known as Tunbridge) in May 1842. The site of the original station was on the east side of the road bridge over the railway, opposite its current location to the west of the bridge. The building of the station obliterated the last remains of Tonbridge Priory. At the time, the line ran to London Bridge via Redhill and Croydon, using the Brighton Main Line. It served as a temporary terminus until December 1842, when the line reached Ashford. A couple of years later the through line to Dover opened. A small engine shed was built; the date of opening is uncertain but it is presumed to date from the opening of the line. On 20 September 1845, a branch to Tunbridge Wells opened. The station was later renamed Tunbridge Junction. Over the next seven years the branch was extended to Hastings. Access to the line to Hastings was via an indirect link which required a reverse. This arrangement lasted until 1868 when a steeply climbing direct route was opened.

However, being forced to share tracks with its rival, the London, Brighton and South Coast Railway, as well as competition from the London, Chatham and Dover Railway meant that the SER decided to build a new route from London Bridge, which ran via Chislehurst and Orpington. The cut-off joined the main line at Tonbridge. This prompted a rebuild of the station, and in 1864 it was rebuilt on its current site with four platforms. The original station was demolished in 1865 after closure, but the entrance gateways are still in situ. The down side entrance is in Vale Road opposite Sainsbury's, and the up side entrance is in Priory Road, forming the entrance to second hand car sales shop.

The cut-off opened in 1868. Soon afterwards, a larger engine shed was built, but still on the opposite side of the bridge to the main part of the station. In May 1893, the station changed its name to Tonbridge Junction, following the change in the town's name to avoid confusion with the larger Tunbridge Wells. At that time, there were two through platforms, two through roads, and two bay platforms at the west end of the station. These bay platforms served the lines to Redhill and Sevenoaks. The indirect line to Tunbridge Wells remained in use until about 1913, after which it was closed and the track dismantled. By November 1919, the up platform station roof bore the name TONBRIDGE in white letters. This feature was a navigational aid for aircraft.

Under the Southern Railway, the station was renamed Tonbridge in July 1929. It was rebuilt in 1935, with the bay on the south side of the station converted to a through platform. This entailed the construction of a new section of bridge under the road outside the station.

By May 1958, the brick station building fronting the main road had been rebuilt with a tiled facade. The Sevenoaks to Dover line via Tonbridge was electrified in 1961 when the Southern Region improved train frequencies and faster journey times were introduced under British Railways as part of the Kent Coast Electrification. The line south to Tunbridge Wells and Hastings was electrified in 1986 by British Rail, and finally the line to Redhill was electrified in 1993 also by British Rail as part of the Eurostar/Channel Tunnel route improvement works.

Eurostar trains ran through Tonbridge station until the first section of the High Speed line was built through Kent, to cut down journey times from London to the Channel Tunnel. The transfer happened on 28 September 2003. The station was refurbished in 2011–12.

In 2015, the station gained a resident cat, Saffie. The 8-year-old animal needed a new home when her owners moved house. Staff at the station adopted her. Saffie died in March 2018.

== Platforms ==
Platforms 1 and 2 are an island platform with tracks signalled for trains in both directions.

- Platform 1 for Southern trains to/from Redhill (which terminate here from the west) and to/from Maidstone West and Strood (which terminate here from the east).
- Platform 2 for trains from Dover, Ramsgate and Hastings to London via Sevenoaks.

Platform 3 is an island platform, and Platform 4 is a west-facing bay.

- Platform 3 for all trains to Dover and Ramsgate via Ashford International and to Hastings via Tunbridge Wells.
- Platform 4 for trains to/from London (which terminate here from the west)

== Services ==
Services at Tonbridge are operated by Southeastern and Southern using Class 375, 377, 465 and 466 EMUs.

The typical off-peak service in trains per hour is:

- 4 tph to London Charing Cross
- 2 tph to Hastings via Tunbridge Wells (1 semi-fast, 1 stopping)
- 1 tph to Dover Priory
- 1 tph to Ramsgate via Canterbury West
- 1 tph to Redhill

Additional services, including trains to and from London Cannon Street, Ramsgate via Deal and Strood via Maidstone West, (plus some services between Charing Cross and Tunbridge Wells only) call at the station during the peak hours.

Preceding station	National Rail	Following station
Terminus	Southeastern Medway Valley line Limited Service	Paddock Wood
Sevenoaks	Southeastern South Eastern Main Line	Paddock Wood
Sevenoaks or Hildenborough	Southeastern Hastings line	High Brooms
Leigh	Southern Redhill to Tonbridge Line	Terminus

== Accidents ==
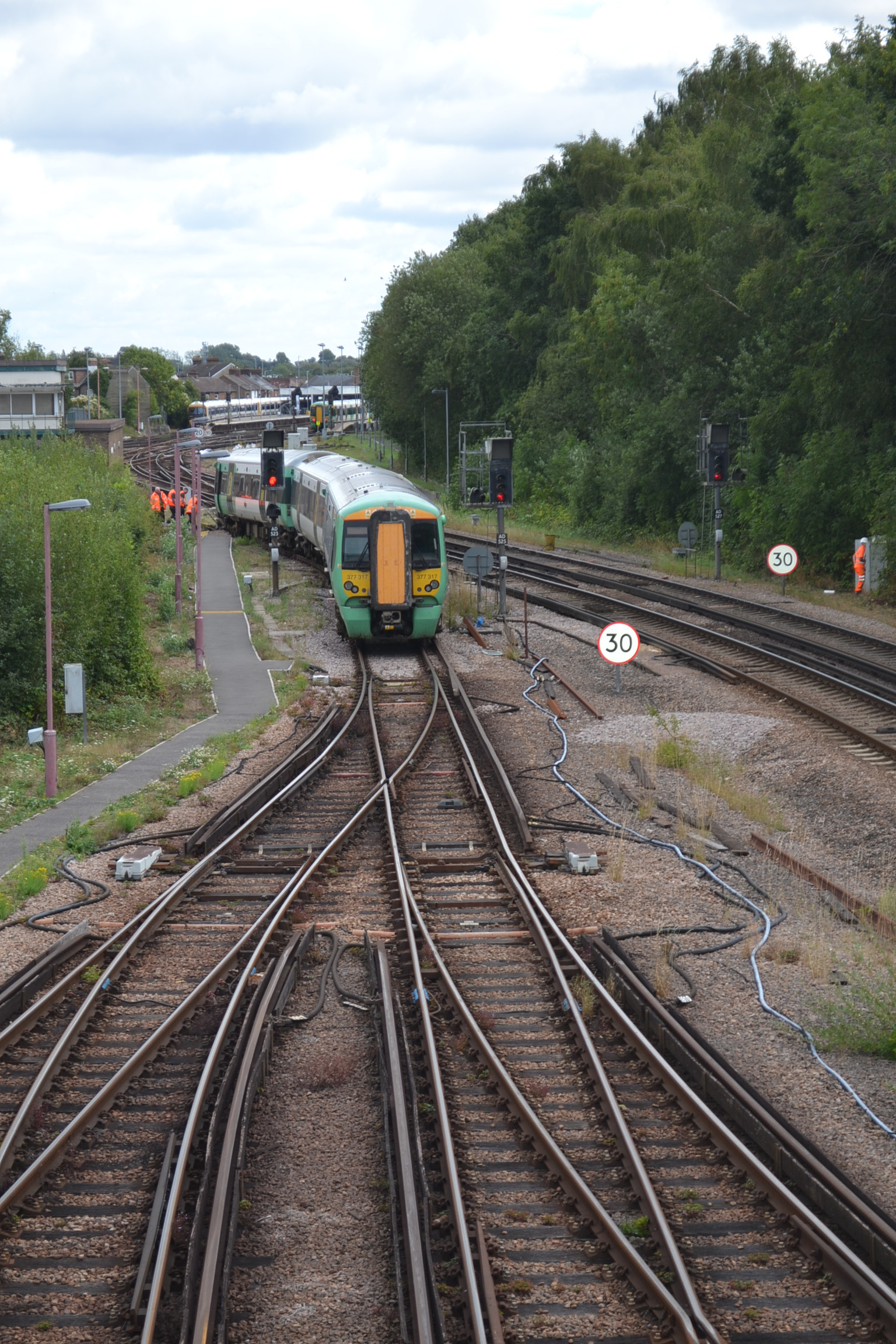
377 317, 23 August 2020.

- On 1 January 1846, a bridge over the River Medway collapsed in a flood. A train driver was killed when he tried to jump clear of the train.
- On 30 September 1866, four carriages which had been slipped from a Dover bound train to be worked to Tunbridge Wells ran through the station and collided with some empty carriages in a siding. Eleven people were injured.
- On 23 October 1899, a passenger train from Redhill collided with the buffer stop in the bay platform. Sixteen people were injured.
- On 23 January 1903, a passenger train from London collided with the buffer stop in the bay platform. Five people were injured.
- On 5 March 1909, a train travelling towards Redhill overran a signal and collided with the boat train from Charing Cross to Dover. Two railway staff were killed and eleven passengers injured. A third train was prevented from crashing into the wreckage by the prompt actions of two travelling ticket inspectors. As a consequence of the accident, the Royal Train carrying King Edward VII and Queen Alexandra was diverted at Chislehurst Junction to take a different route to Dover.
- On 23 August 2020, Class 377 electric multiple unit 377317 was derailed at the exit of the Jubilee Sidings.

== Sources ==
- Butt, R. V. J. (1995). The Directory of Railway Stations. Sparkford: Patrick Stephens Ltd. ISBN 1-85260-508-1.
- Chapman, Frank (6 March 2009). "Rail crash publicity huge as quick thinking saves King and Queen". Kent & Sussex Courier. Courier Group Newspapers.
- Jewell, Brian (1984). Down the line to Hastings. Southborough: The Baton Press. ISBN 0-85936-223-X.
- Mitchell, Vic; Smith, Keith (1987). Tonbridge to Hastings. Easebourne: Middleton Press. ISBN 0-906520-44-4.
- Neve, Arthur (1933). The Tonbridge of Yesterday. The Tonbridge Free Press. p. facing page 126. Archived from the original on 18 January 2016.
