= Whitstable Harbour railway station =

Disused railway station in Kent

Whitstable Harbour
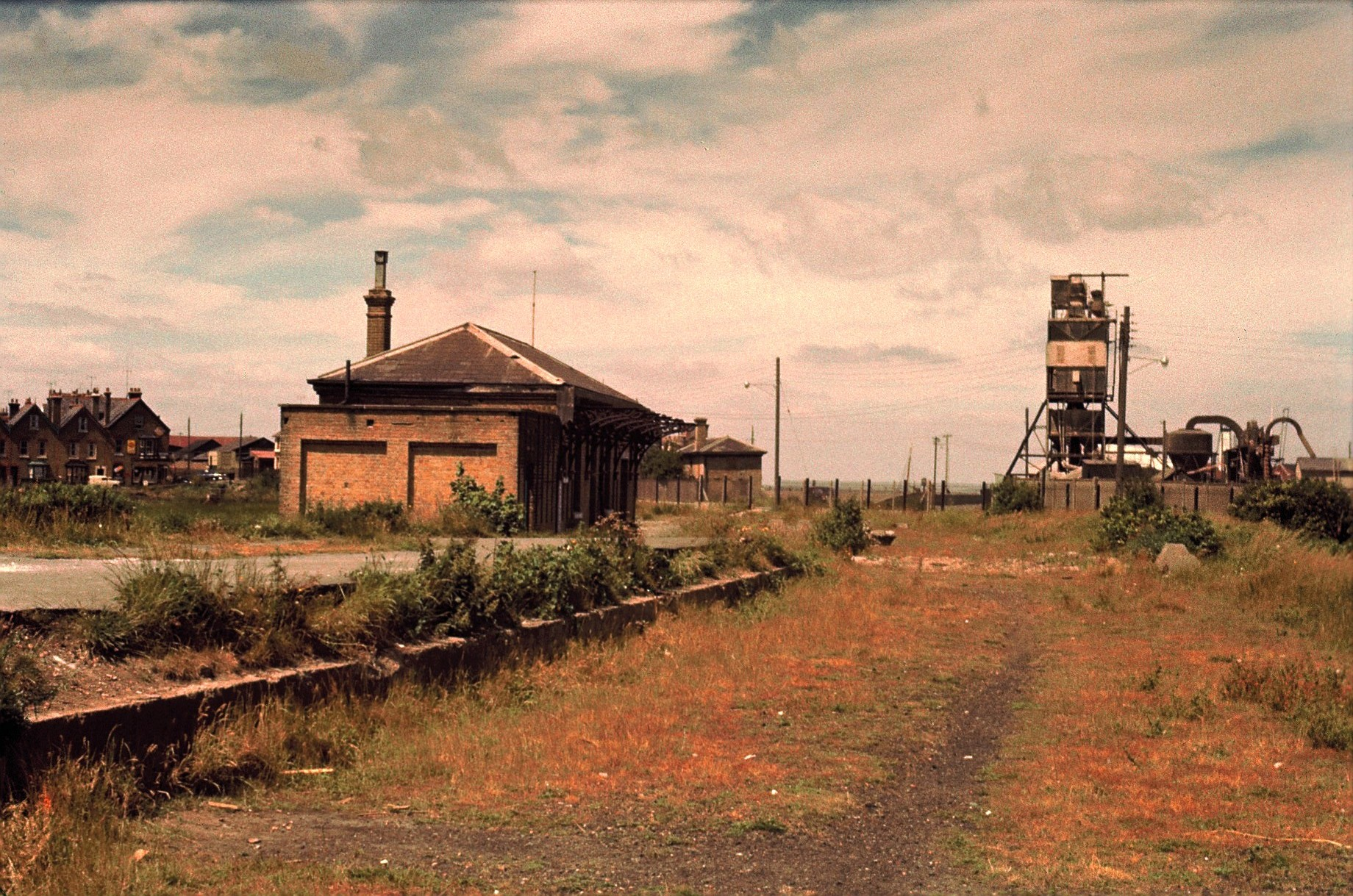
- The second station, in the 1960s. First station in background.

General information
- Location: Whitstable, Kent; England
- Coordinates: 51°21′47″N 1°1′50″E
- Grid reference: TR 107 660

Other information
- Status: Disused

History
- Original company: Canterbury and Whitstable Railway
- Pre-grouping: South Eastern Railway
- Post-grouping: Southern Railway

Key dates
- 3 May 1830: Opened
- Mid-1870s: Extended
- 3 June 1895: Resited
- 1 January 1931: Closed to passengers
- 1 December 1952: Closed
- 5 February 1953: Line temporarily reopened
- 28 February 1953: Closed
Location

Whitstable Harbour railway station was the name of two disused railway stations serving Whitstable the terminus of the Canterbury and Whitstable Railway. The station opened in 1830. It was extended in the mid-1870s and resited in 1895. The Canterbury and Whitstable line closed to passengers in 1931 and freight in 1952, although it was reopened for a month following the North Sea flood of 1953.

== History ==
The original station was opened on 2 May 1830. It was located north of Harbour Street. Whitstable Harbour was built by Thomas Telford. It was opened on 19 March 1832. In 1847, coke ovens were erected at Whitstable Harbour. In the mid-1870s, the station was extended. A brick-built booking office was provided and the platform was extended to take three carriages. The coke ovens closed in 1880 when the South Eastern Railway switched to using Welsh steam coal to fuel its locomotives. The layout of the original station meant that when passenger trains were using it, the shunting of wagons was impeded. In 1895, a new passenger station was built south of Harbour Street, opening on 3 June.

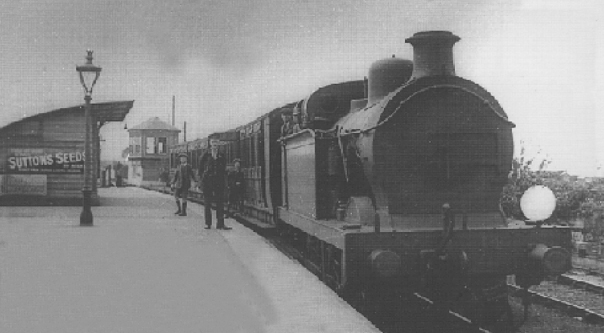
The second Whitstable Harbour station in 1920

The Canterbury and Whitstable Railway closed to passengers on 1 January 1931. The signal box at the station closed on 11 February 1931, with the line being worked as a siding thereafter. The line remained open to freight until 1 December 1952. Following the North Sea flood of 1953, the railway was reopened on 5 February, closing on 28 February.

Preceding station	Disused railways	Following station
Terminus	South Eastern Railway; Canterbury and Whitstable Railway	Canterbury North Lane (1830-46 (p) / 1830-91 (f) ) / Canterbury West (1846-1908, 1931-52)
Terminus	South Eastern Railway; Canterbury and Whitstable Railway	Blean and Tyler Hill Halt (1908-11)
Terminus	South Eastern Railway; Canterbury and Whitstable Railway	South Street Halt (1911-14)
Terminus	British Railways; Southern Region; Canterbury and Whitstable Railway	Tankerton Halt (1914-31)
