= Tankerton Halt railway station =

Disused railway station in Kent, England

Tankerton Halt
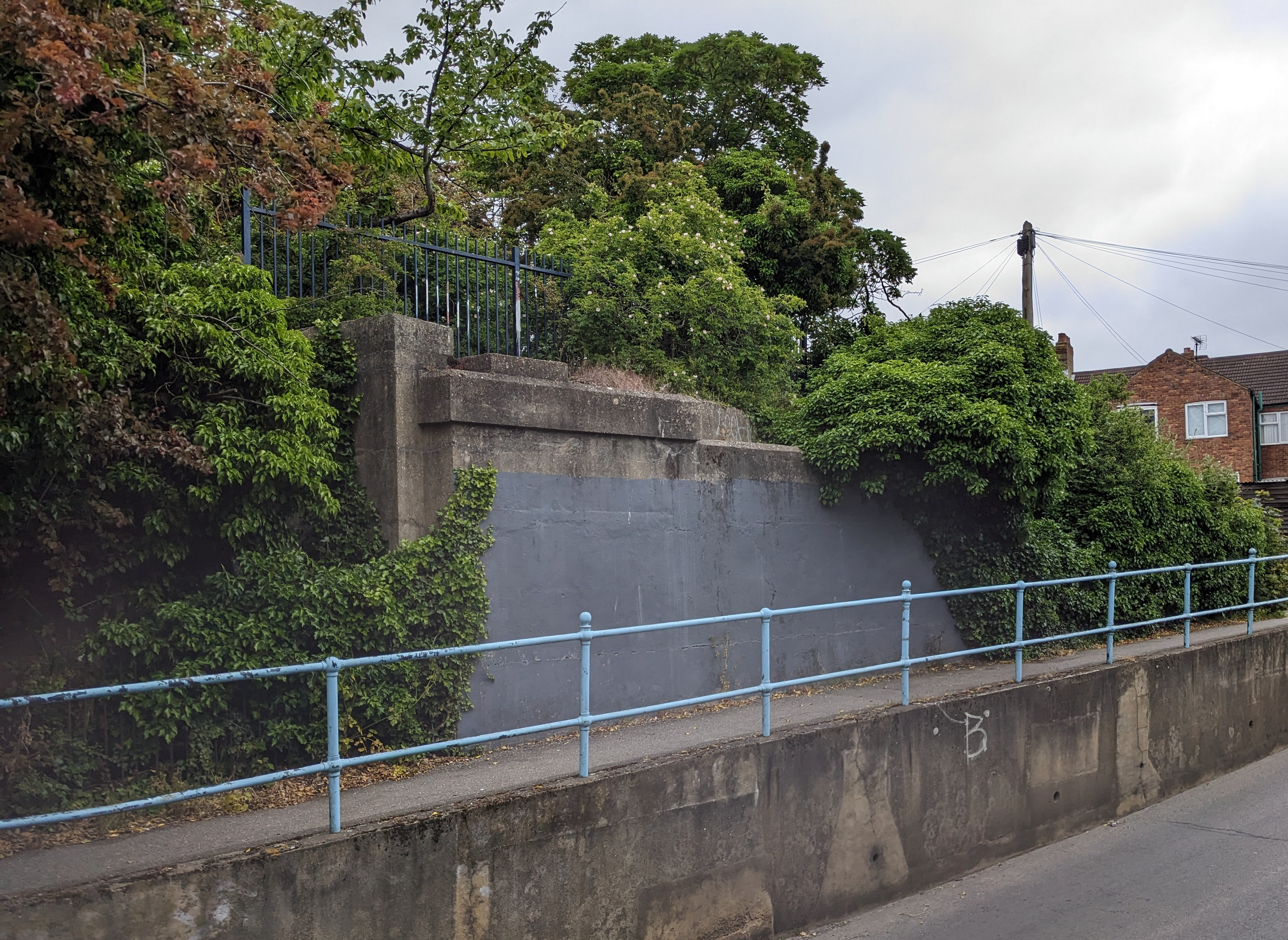
- Tankerton Halt railway station

General information
- Location: Tankerton, Kent; England
- Coordinates: 51°21′29″N 1°02′11″E
- Grid reference: TR 115 665
- Platforms: 1

Other information
- Status: Disused

History
- Original company: South Eastern Railway
- Post-grouping: Southern Railway

Key dates
- 1 July 1914: Opened
- 1 January 1931: Closed
Location

Tankerton Halt was a minor station on the Canterbury and Whitstable Railway at Tankerton, Kent. It opened in 1914 and closed in 1931.

== History ==
Tankerton Halt was opened on 1 July 1914. It was located immediately north of the point where the Canterbury and Whitstable Railway crossed the Faversham–Margate line. A footpath connected it with the nearby Whitstable Town station. The halt was provided with a small building which served as a ticket office. Lighting was by gas. The entire structure was built of wood. The halt closed on 1 January 1931, when passenger services ceased on the Canterbury and Whitstable Railway. The station was demolished after closure and the site is now undeveloped.

Preceding station	Disused railways	Following station
Whitstable Harbour	British Railways; Southern Region; Canterbury and Whitstable Railway	South Street Halt
