= Invicta (locomotive) =

Preserved early British 0-4-0 locomotive

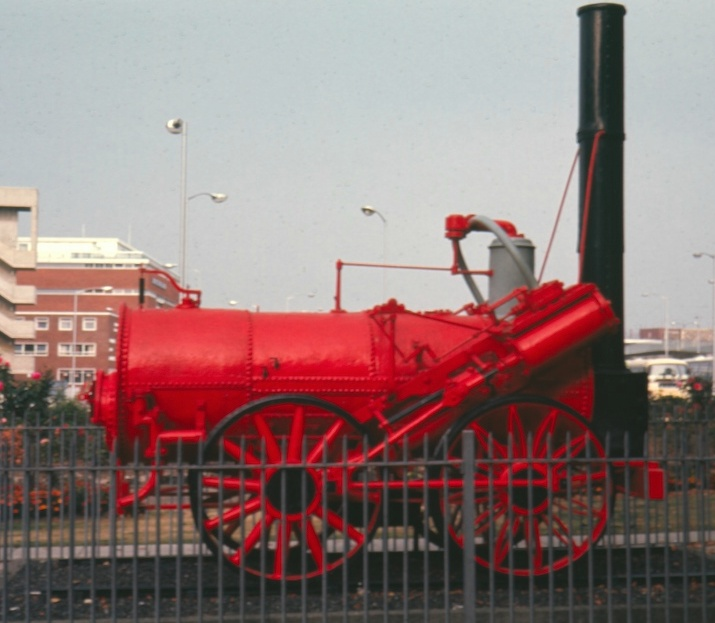
- Invicta, plinthed at Canterbury in the 1970s
Type and origin
- Power type: Steam
- Designer: Robert Stephenson
- Builder: Robert Stephenson and Company
- Build date: 1829
Specifications
- Configuration
  - Whyte: 0-4-0
- Gauge: 4 ft 8 1/2 in (1,435 mm)
- Coupled dia.: 4 ft (1,219 mm)
- Loco weight: 6 long tons 5 cwt (14,000 lb or 6.4 t)
- Fuel type: Coal
- Firebox
  - Type: Rectangular
- Boiler
  - Type: Round-top
  - Diameter: 3.25 ft (0.99 m)
  - Tube plates: 8 ft (2.44 m)
  - Small tubes: 25 × 3 in (76.2 mm)
- Boiler pressure: 40 lbf/in^{2} (275.8 kPa)
- Heating surface
  - Firebox: 39 sq ft (3.6 m^{2})
  - Tubes: 157 sq ft (14.6 m^{2})
  - Total surface: 192 sq ft (17.8 m^{2})
- Cylinders: Two, outside
- Cylinder size: 10 in × 18 in (254.0 mm × 457.2 mm)
- Valve gear: Stephenson valve gear
Performance figures
- Power output: 4 hp (3.0 kW)
- Tractive effort: 1,275 lbf (5,670 N)
Career
- Operators: Canterbury and Whitstable Railway
- First run: 30 May 1830
- Withdrawn: 1839
- Current owner: Canterbury Museums & Galleries
- Disposition: Static Display

Invicta is an early steam locomotive, built by Robert Stephenson and Company in Newcastle-upon-Tyne during 1829. She was the twentieth locomotive built by railway engineers the Stephensons, being constructed immediately after Rocket. Invicta marked the end of the first phase of locomotive design, which had started with Richard Trevithick's Coalbrookdale locomotive of 1802.

Invicta hauled its first train on the Canterbury and Whitstable Railway on 30 May 1830, which was also the first steam-powered passenger service on the railway. Invicta remained in active service until 1839, when stationary engines were introduced to pull trains. Following a failed attempt to sell the locomotive, she was placed in storage. The stored Invicta became the property of the South Eastern Railway during the 1840s, and was moved to Ashford Works, becoming the first locomotive in the world to be preserved.

Invicta was put on display and appeared at various events in the UK and abroad. It was restored in 1892, and in 1906 presented to the city of Canterbury by the South Eastern and Chatham Railway. For 70 years, Invicta was on static display in Canterbury. In 1977, a full cosmetic restoration of the locomotive was undertaken with help from the National Railway Museum. Presently, Invicta is owned by the Transport Trust. During November 2008, it was announced that a £41,000 Heritage Lottery Fund grant had been made to Canterbury City Council to develop a new museum at Whitstable to house Invicta. The extension was completed in 2019, and Invicta was lifted to its new home on 16 June 2019.

== History ==
=== Construction ===
The Canterbury and Whitstable Railway ordered a single locomotive from Robert Stephenson & Co in 1829, and construction of Invicta started that year at Stephenson's Forth Street works in Newcastle upon Tyne. The locomotive's name comes from the Invicta motto on the Flag of Kent and means undefeated. Invicta was probably designed by Robert Stephenson, in consultation with his father George Stephenson. Invicta shares several features with Stephenson's Rocket, which was completed in 1829 at the same factory. Both have inclined cylinders set on the sides of the boiler, but on Invicta the cylinders are at the front, with connecting rods driving the rear wheels, and coupling rods driving the front wheels.

The original fire-tube boiler had 25 tubes of 3 inches (76 mm) diameter. It had a total heating surface of 196 square feet (18.2 m^{2}) square meters — 157 square feet (14.6 m^{2}) from the tubes and 39 square feet (3.6 m^{2}) from the rectangular firebox. The boiler had a working steam pressure of 40 pounds per square inch (280 kPa). The four-coupled wheels were 4 feet (1.22 m) in diameter, while the boiler was 8 feet (2.44 m) long and 3.25 feet (0.99 m) in diameter.

The locomotive weighed 6 tons 5 cwt excluding the tender and produced 4 horsepower (3.0 kW). Contemporary illustrations show that Invicta was originally equipped with a single-axle tender, which has not survived. The major controls, including the regulator are located about halfway along the boiler's left-hand side. It was operated by a driver, who stood on a timber footboard mounted above the locomotive's rear wheel (as on Locomotion No. 1) and a fireman who stood in the tender.

=== Operational life ===
Upon completion on 15 April 1830, Invicta was shipped by sea from Newcastle to Whitstable. On 30 May 1830, it hauled the inaugural train of the Canterbury and Whitstable Railway into Whitstable Harbour station. For this maiden journey, the locomotive was driven by Edward Fletcher, who later became the locomotive superintendent of the North Eastern Railway. Invicta was the sole locomotive to be used on the line at the time of its opening.

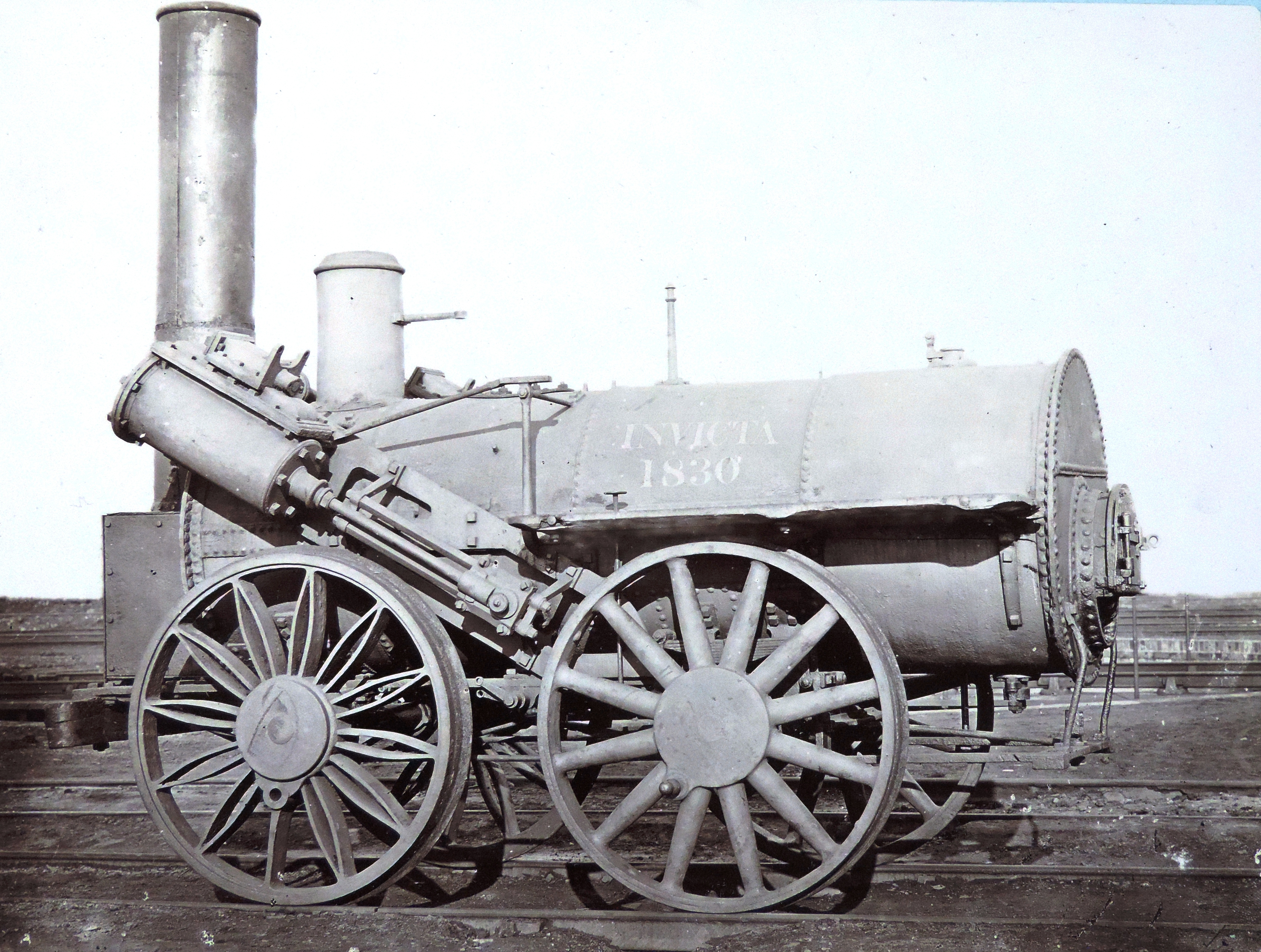
Photograph of Invicta, minus its tender

Initial operations using Invicta saw it routed along the northern two miles of the Canterbury & Whitstable line; however, it soon became apparent that the locomotive lacked the power at any speed to haul trains up the steep incline along Church Street when departing Whitstable. An alternative working practice was adopted to address this power shortage, starting in 1832; instead, trains were pulled up the incline using a stationary engine, which was reportedly capable of generating up to 11.2 kW (15.0 hp), that was positioned at the top of the slope, while Invicta was restricted to work the 1.6 km (0.99 mi) of track at South Street, which was relatively level.

In 1836, it was decided to give Invicta several modifications. These involved adding another ring section to the boiler in place of the firebox and the replacement of the original multi-tube boiler with a single flue boiler; this last change proved to be a retrograde step, as even by that time it had been accepted that multi-tube boilers were more efficient than their single-tube counterparts. Reportedly these changes negative impacted locomotive's performance, often failing to produce a sufficient head of steam as to allow adequate performance. The locomotive's service life following these failures was brief.

== Preservation ==
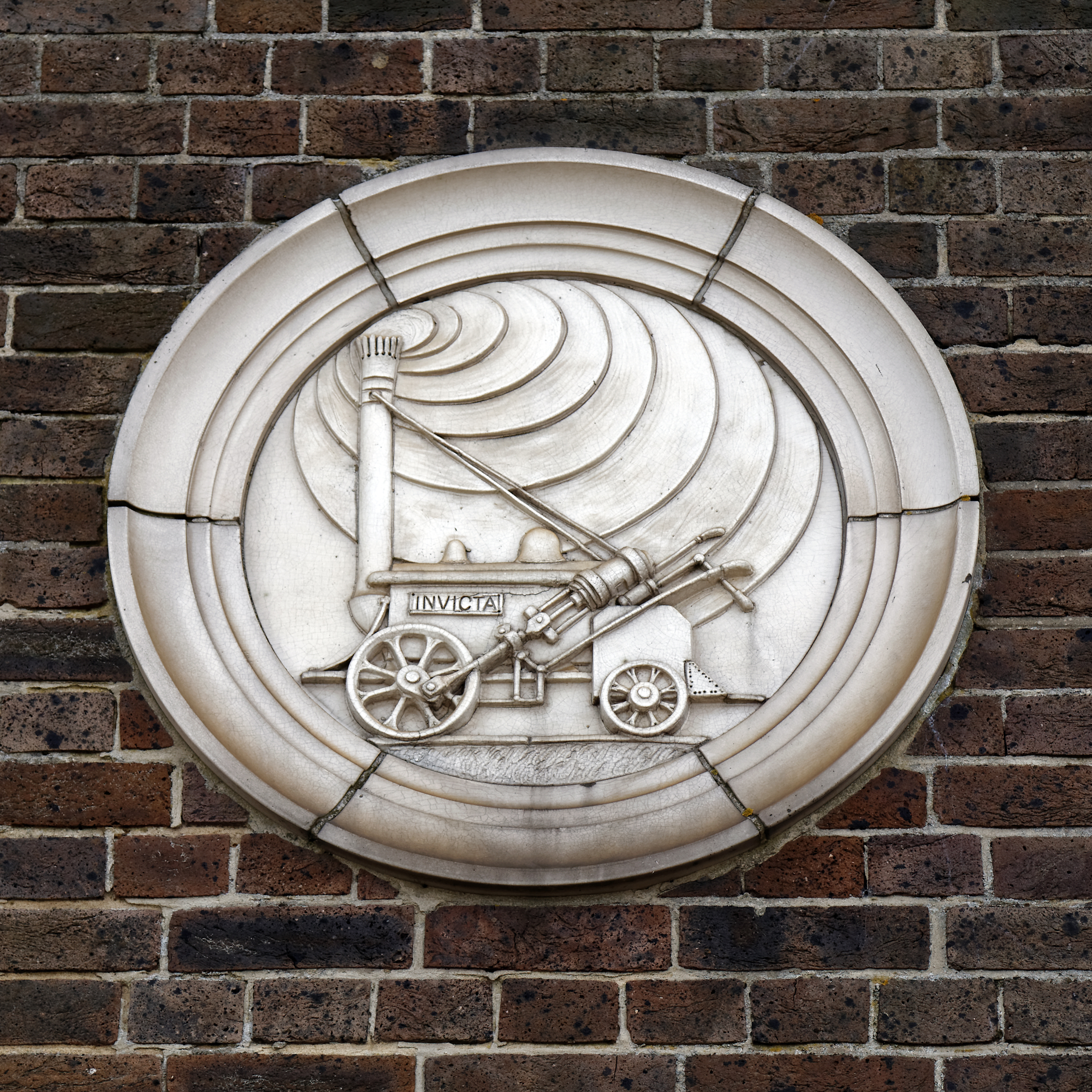
A commemorative plaque depicting a Stephenson's Rocket-type locomotive, labelled "Invicta", at Margate railway station, Kent

During 1839, Invicta was withdrawn from use upon the Canterbury and Whitstable Railway after it was decided to use stationary engines for pulling trains, which had proved to be both adequate for the line's working and less troubled by a lack of power than a locomotive. While it was offered for sale by the company in October 1839, no buyer took up the offer. As a result, Invicta was instead put under cover at Canterbury North Lane station.

It came into ownership of the South Eastern Railway in 1844 and was soon relocated to Ashford Works, albeit without the original two-wheeled tender. Invicta was thus the first locomotive to be preserved; over the following years, it became a physical icon of the early years of rail travel. During 1875, Invicta was exhibited at the Stockton and Darlington Railway's 50th anniversary; It also made an appearance at the Newcastle Stephenson Centenary in 1881.

During 1892, it is believed that work was begun upon its restoration; few details on this process are known. Afterward Invicta was exhibited at the 1900 Exposition Universelle in Paris, France. In 1906, Invicta was presented to the city of Canterbury by David Lionel Goldsmid-Stern-Salomons, a director of the South Eastern and Chatham Railway. For 70 years, Invicta was put on static display in the Dane John Gardens, Canterbury. During this time, it is believed it was given a red coat of paint. It was not until 1977 that a full cosmetic restoration of the locomotive was undertaken with help from the National Railway Museum, to which it was transported by road. This work included the ironwork being painted black and the installation of timber cladding around the boiler barrel. Following the completion of this restoration, Invicta returned to Canterbury in time for the 150th anniversary of the Canterbury & Whitstable Railway on 3 May 1980.

Presently, the cosmetically restored Invicta is owned by the Transport Trust; it had been loaned for many years to the Canterbury Heritage Museum, where it had been on display before the museum's closure in 2017. During November 2008, it was announced that a £41,000 Heritage Lottery Fund planning grant had been made to Canterbury City Council to develop a new museum at Whitstable to house Invicta, as well as a stationary winding engine that was built at Robert Stephenson's works. In the months after Canterbury Heritage Museum closed down, the long term residence of Invicta was a topic of considerable debate, during which numerous museums petitioned to have it in their collections. Invicta was lifted in to its new home at the Whitstable Museum and Gallery on 16 June 2019.
