= South Street Halt railway station =

Disused railway station in Kent, England

South Street Halt

General information
- Location: Chestfield, Kent; England
- Coordinates: 51°20′53″N 1°02′45″E
- Grid reference: TR 122 654
- Platforms: 1

Other information
- Status: Disused

History
- Original company: South Eastern Railway
- Post-grouping: Southern Railway

Key dates
- 1 June 1911: Opened
- 1 January 1931: Closed
Location

South Street Halt was a minor station on the Canterbury and Whitstable Railway at Tankerton, Kent. It opened in 1911 and closed in 1931.

== History ==
South Street Halt was opened on 1 June 1911. The single platform halt was provided with a small shelter. The entire struction was built of wood, apart from the shelter, which was clad in corrugated iron. The halt closed on 1 January 1931, when passenger services ceased on the Canterbury and Whitstable Railway. The station was demolished after closure and the trackbed is now part of the Crab and Winkle footpath.

Preceding station	Disused railways	Following station
Tankerton Halt	British Railways; Southern Region; Canterbury and Whitstable Railway	Blean and Tyler Hill Halt
