= Whitstable =

Town in Kent, England

Coordinates: 51.361°N 1.026°E

- Town
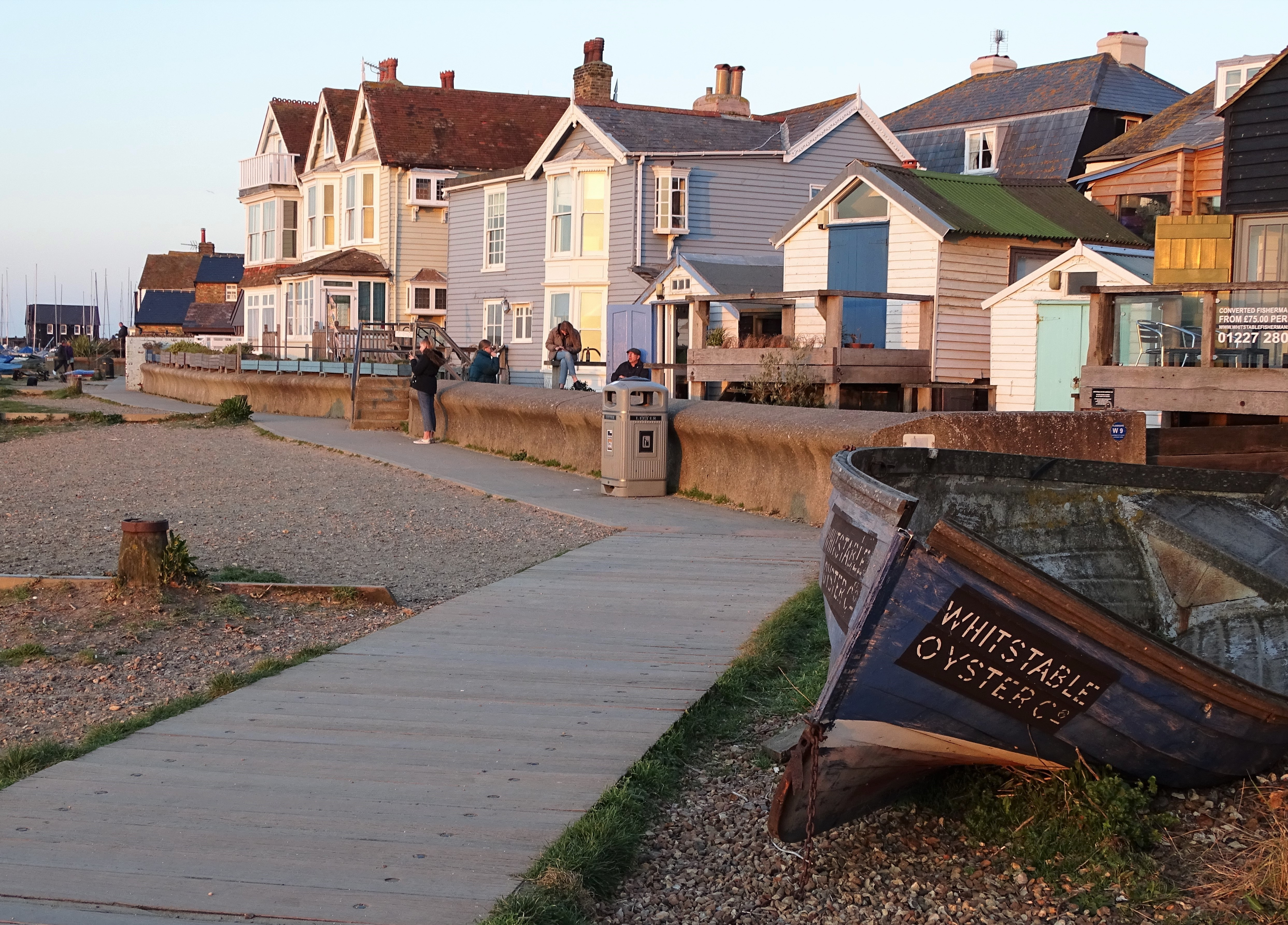

- Location within Kent
- Population: 32,196 (2021)
- OS grid reference: TR107667
- District: Canterbury
- Shire county: Kent
- Region: South East
- Country: England
- Sovereign state: United Kingdom
- Post town: Whitstable
- Postcode district: CT5
- Dialling code: 01227
- Police: Kent
- Fire: Kent
- Ambulance: South East Coast
- UK Parliament: Canterbury

Whitstable (/ˈwɪtstəbəl/) is a town in the Canterbury district, on the north coast of Kent, England, at the convergence of the Swale and the Greater Thames Estuary, five miles (eight kilometres) north of Canterbury and two miles (three kilometres) west of Herne Bay. In 2021 it had a population of 32,196.

The town, formerly known as Whitstable-on-Sea, was famous for oysters, collected from beds beyond the low water mark from Roman times until the mid-20th century. The annual Whitstable Oyster Festival takes place during the summer.

In 1830, the Canterbury and Whitstable Railway, one of the earliest passenger services, opened. In 1832, the company built a harbour and extended the line to handle coal and other bulk cargos for the City of Canterbury. The railway has closed, but the harbour still plays an important role in the town's economy. The railway route is now a cycle path which leads to Canterbury.

== History ==
Archaeological finds indicate that the Whitstable area was inhabited during the Palaeolithic era, the Bronze Age and the Iron Age. Oysters were harvested in the area in Roman times. The remains of a Roman building have been found in the centre of the town. Charters indicate that there were Saxon settlements where salt production and coastal trade occurred. In the 19th century, extensive finds of Roman pottery were found in the sea around Whitstable during oyster dredging, and an offshore rock near the town has been associated with Caunos, an island mentioned by Ptolemy.

The town was recorded in the Domesday Book of 1086, under the name Witenestaple, meaning "the meeting place of the white post", a reference to a local landmark. At that time, Witenestaple was the administrative centre of the hundred of Witenestaple which stretched from the coast to the village of Blean, 3 kilometres (2 mi) north of Canterbury. In addition to Witenestaple, the hundred contained three manors at Seasalter, Northwood and Swalecliffe. Whitstable hundred was located within the Lathe of St Augustine.

The Seasalter and Swalecliffe manors were owned by the church, and the manor at Northwood was run by a noble family on behalf of the king. Fisheries were located at the Seasalter manor, saltworks were at the Northwood manor, and pigs were farmed at the forest in Blean. By 1226, the name of the area had evolved into Whitstaple. Saltworks were opened at the Seasalter manor around the turn of the 14th century, and a sea wall was built there in 1325 to prevent coastal flooding. The history and development of the town has determined and been determined by the shape and location of the coast which has changed over recorded history due to natural events and human interventions.

By the late middle ages Whitstable had become a centre of Thames Estuary fishing, including for oysters, and was connected by road to Chestfield where archaeological finds evidence seafood consumption, as well as the Forest of Blean.

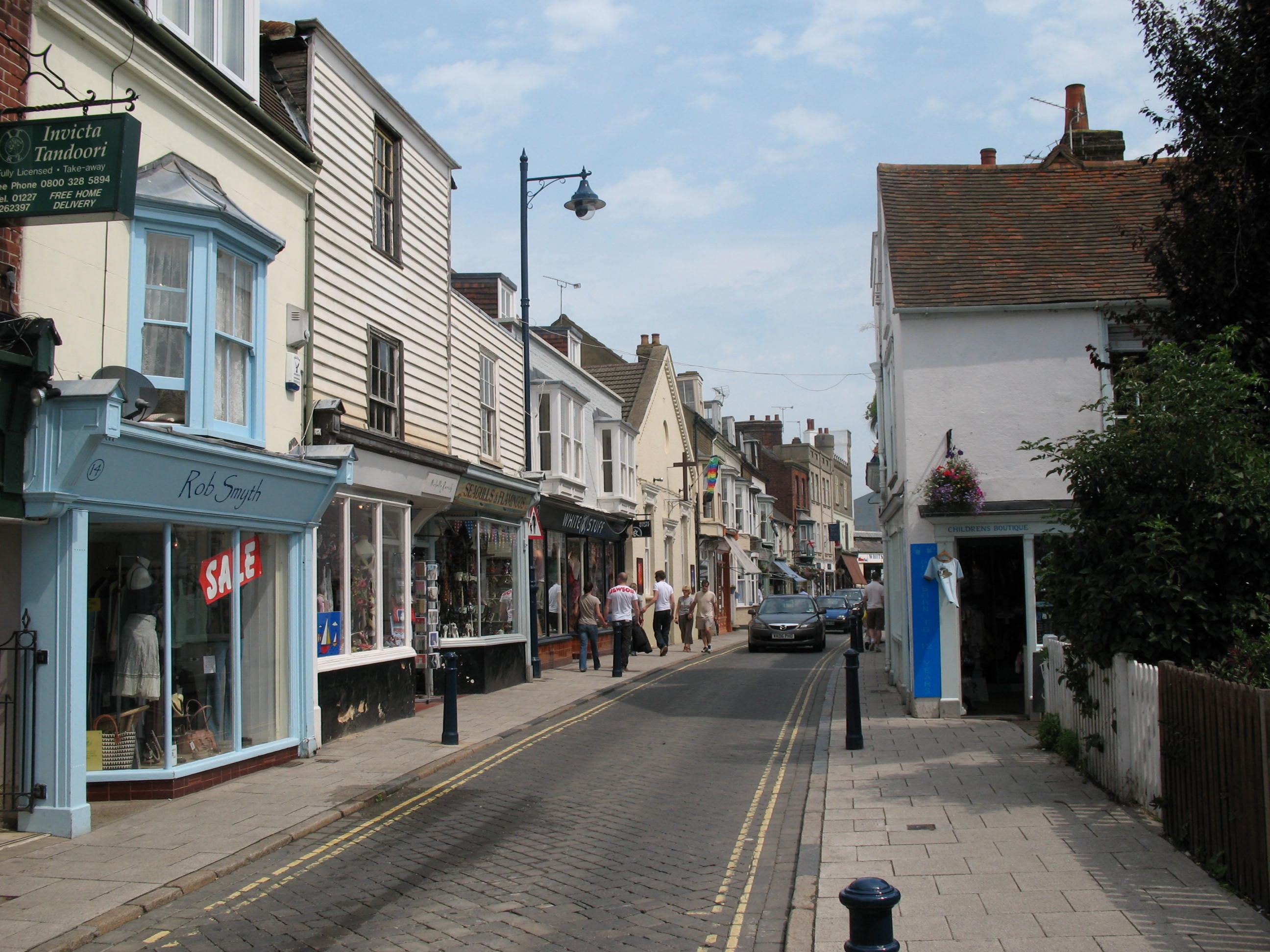
Harbour Street in Whitstable Town Centre

By 1413, the three manors had combined to form the Whitstaple manor, and had been sold to a religious foundation in Essex. The manor was seized by King Henry VIII during the Dissolution of the Monasteries in the 16th century, and was given to the Minter family, originally from Ickham. Branches of the Minter family survive today in the same area. A royal patent was granted in 1574 to the manor owner for the fishing of its oyster beds, and in the same year, the lands at Tankerton were incorporated into the manor. A copperas works was established at Tankerton in 1588, which operated until about 1830. By 1610, the name Whitstaple had become Whitstable.

Around the mid-18th century, goods and passengers began to be transported by ship between London and Whitstable, and a toll road was built to the cathedral city of Canterbury. These improvements in transport led to the town's development as a seaside resort; the first advertisements for bathing machines at Whitstable appeared in 1768. In 1790 the manor was sold to private landowners, and three years later the rights to harvest the oyster beds were bought by the newly established Company of Free Fishers and Dredgers of Whitstable, the successor to the Whitstable Company of Dredgers. Between roughly 1775 and 1875 the well smacks or early longliners out of Barking and other local fishing ports would collect lugworms and whelks from Whitstable's bait-diggers and dredgers before beginning their tour for prime fish north to Iceland. Whelks suspended in net bags in the well could live for a while due to circulating water. In the 1880s, Whitstable was described as having "an unrivalled, and indeed unchallenged, position in the oyster world".

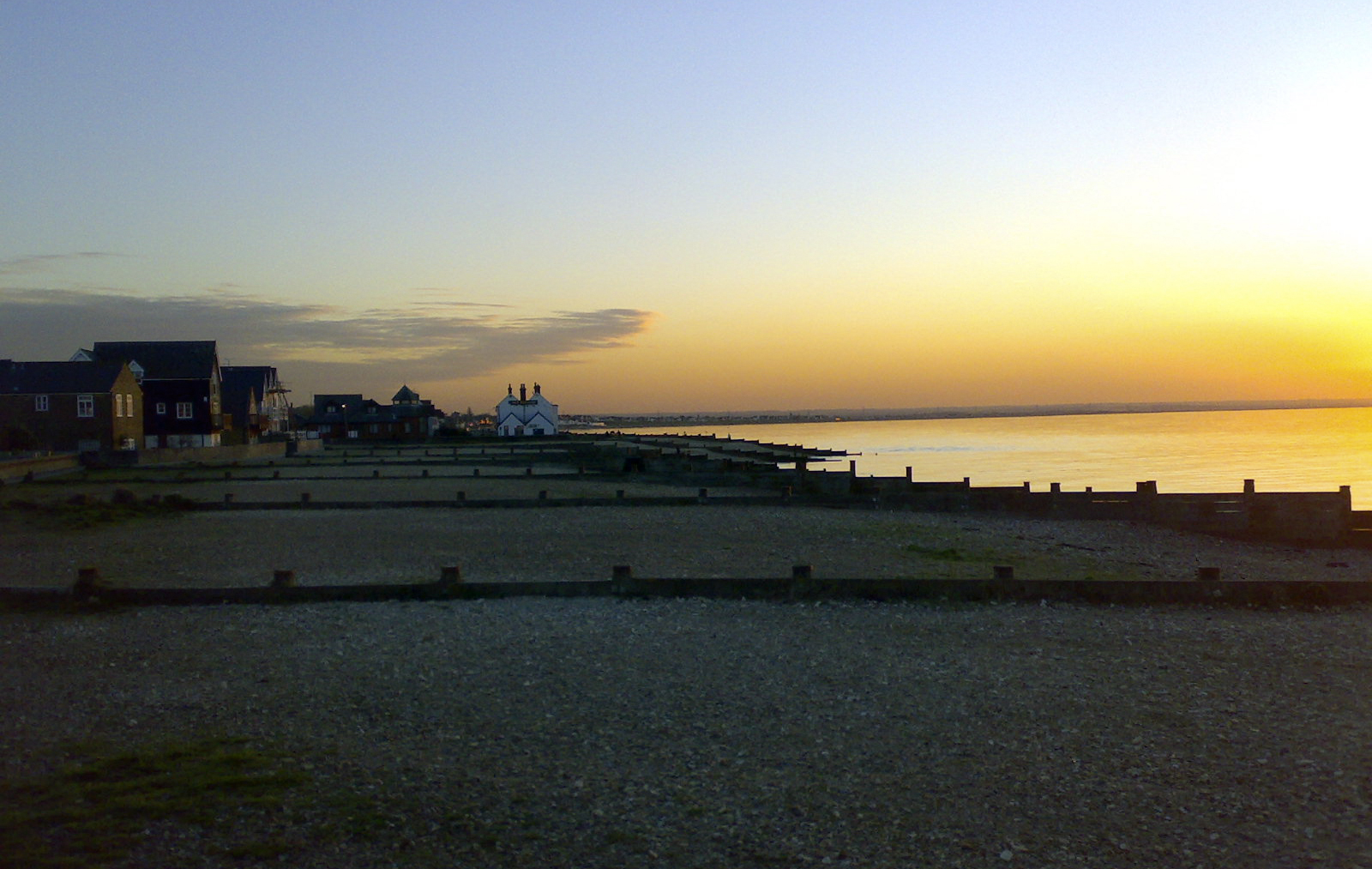
Whitstable Beach

On 3 May 1830, the world's first entirely steam-hauled passenger and freight railway service was opened by the Canterbury and Whitstable Railway Company. Designed by William James, the line ran six miles (10 km) from Westgate in Canterbury to Whitstable town centre. The railway line's initials—C&WR—and Whitstable's shellfish industry eventually led to its nickname, the Crab And Winkle Railway. The line carried coal arriving by sea in Whitstable to Canterbury, delivered by colliers sailing from the north east of England. At this time, the town also had a thriving shipbuilding industry. In the mid nineteenth century, hoys also sailed regularly from London to Whitstable.

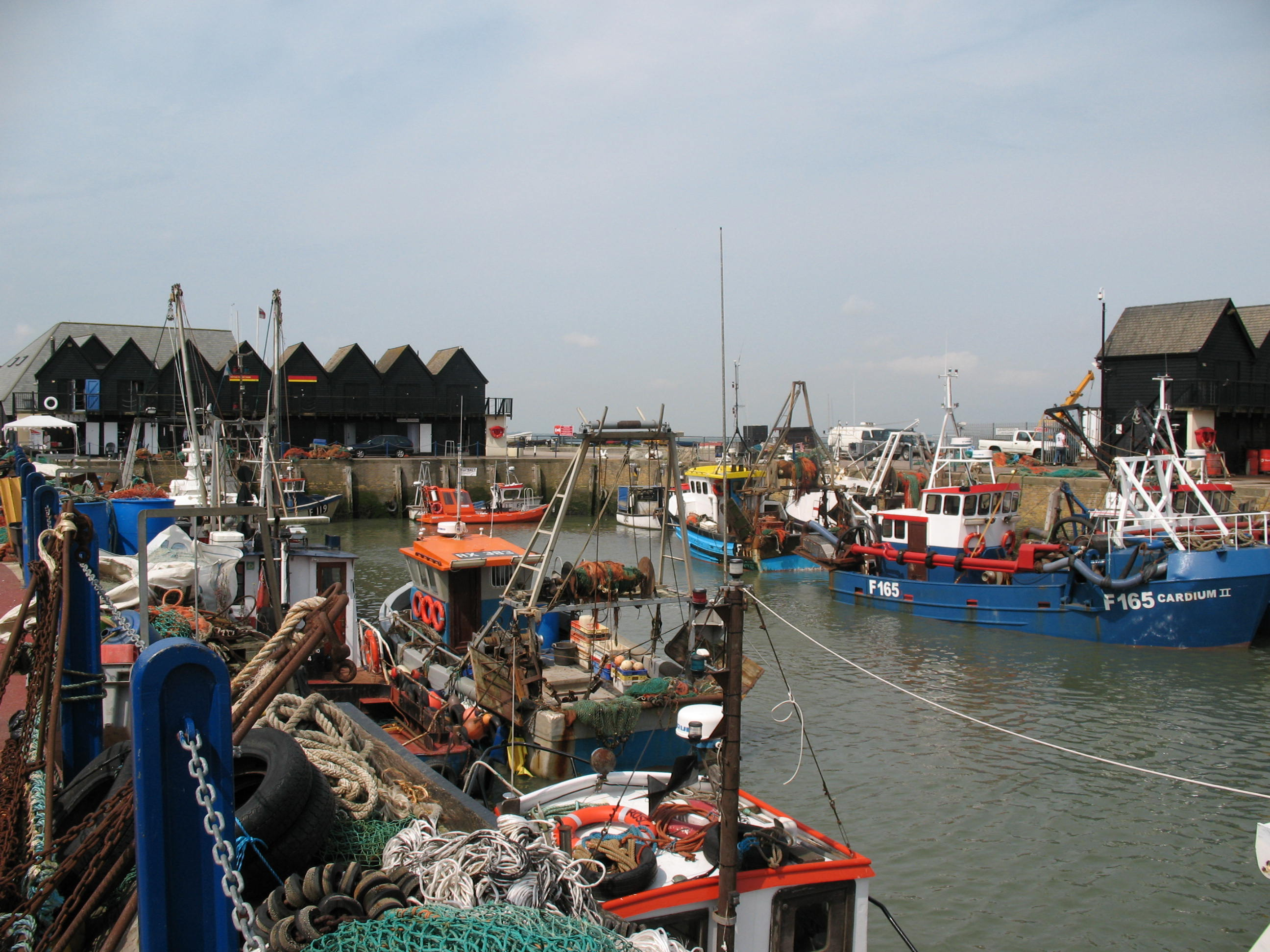
Whitstable Harbour

Trains were driven by a locomotive for part of the journey, but on inclined planes were pulled on ropes by steam-driven stationary winding engines located at Tyler Hill and Clowes Wood. The locomotive used was the Invicta, an 0-4-0 inclined cylinder tender locomotive built by Robert Stephenson, the son of engineer George Stephenson. Whitstable harbour - also designed by Stephenson - was opened by the railway company in 1832, and the rail line was extended to enable goods, mainly coal, to be directly transferred from ships onto the trains. In 1834, the world's first season tickets were issued for the C&WR line. The harbour's size and positioning meant that it was the last place on England's east coast where barquentines, schooners and brigantines transporting coal could operate, with sailing colliers serving Whitstable Harbour until the 1920s.

The Invicta locomotive was retired in 1840 and replaced by horses until a third winding engine was built at South Street. The Invicta was kept for scrap, but in 1898 work began on its restoration, which continued intermittently until its completion in 1977 by the National Railway Museum in York. On 3 May 1980 the locomotive was returned to Canterbury to celebrate the 150th anniversary of the line. On Sunday 16 June 2019 Invicta was returned to the Whitstable Museum & Gallery.

Around the time of the construction of the Whitstable to Canterbury line, the local Gorrell stream was diverted into what was known as the Backwater reservoir, so as to prevent the railway needing to cross the estuary of the stream on damp and unstable land. The Gorrell Backwater was then filled through the stream itself as well as rain water drainage when the tide was in, and whilst out the water would be released into the newly built Whitstable Harbour. The reservoir unfortunately would contribute to the flooding of the town during years when the reservoir could not be drained, such as in 1897 and 1953 when weather conditions were exceptionally bad. This continued into the late 1960s, when fire engines were used to pump out large quantities of the water to prevent further flooding.

In the early 1970s, the present Gorrell Tank was built underground, with the Gorrell Car Park being in service above ground since.

In 1845, the Canterbury and Whitstable Railway Company was bought by the South Eastern Railway, who introduced steam locomotives capable of operating along the entire length of the railway. A direct rail route from Whitstable to London was established in 1860 when the London, Chatham and Dover Railway opened a station on what is now the Chatham Main Line. On 16 November 1869, 71 buildings in the town were destroyed by a fire which started at a shop near the harbour. In about 1854 the first branch of the Sea Cadet Corps, then known as the Naval Lads' Brigade, was established in the town by the Reverend Henry Barton.

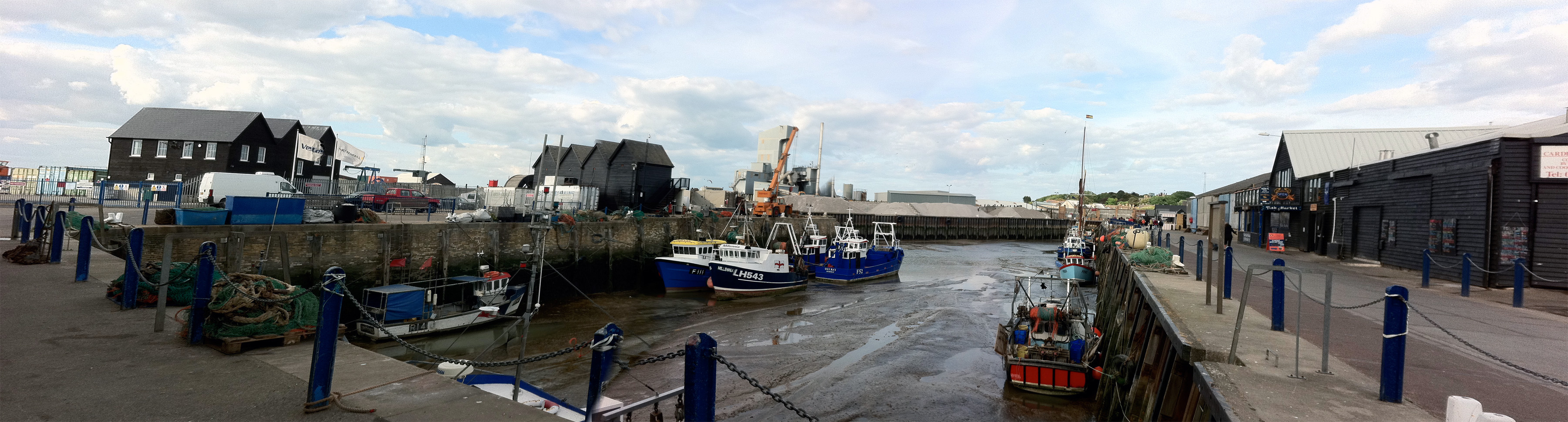
Whitstable harbour; the tarmac plant is visible in the background.

A plant to manufacture tarmacadam was built beside Whitstable Harbour in 1936. The harbour gradually fell into decay after the Second World War, but in 1958 the Whitstable Urban District Council purchased and repaired the harbour with the intention of rejuvenating the town's economy.

The Crab and Winkle Line finally closed in 1953, but about a third of the line was reopened as a footpath and cycleway in 1999 under the stewardship of a local charity, the Crab and Winkle Line Trust. One of the main developments to the town in recent years was the Horsebridge project. Completed in 2005, it was designed to regenerate a dilapidated area of the town with the construction of new shops and houses, a town square, and a community centre with a performance space and art gallery.

=== Oysters ===
Free Fishers of Whitstable Act 1793
- Act of Parliament
- Parliament of Great Britain
- Long title: An Act for incorporating the Company of Free Fishers and Dredgers of Whitstable, in the County of Kent, and for the better ordering and Government of the Fishery.
- Citation: 33 Geo. 3. c. 42
- Territorial extent: Great Britain

Dates
- Royal assent: 30 April 1793
- Commencement: 30 April 1793 (Note: The Acts of Parliament (Commencement) Act 1793.)
Other legislation
Amended by	Whitstable Oyster Fishery Act 1896
Relates to	Faversham Oyster Fishery Company Act 1840; Faversham Oyster Fishery Act 1930

Status: Amended

Text of statute as originally enacted

Faversham Oyster Fishery Company Act 1840
- Act of Parliament
- Parliament of the United Kingdom
- Long title: An Act for granting certain Powers to the Faversham Oyster Fishery Company.
- Citation: 3 & 4 Vict. c. lix
- Territorial extent: United Kingdom

Dates
- Royal assent: 4 June 1840
- Commencement: 4 June 1840
- Repealed: 4 June 1930
Other legislation
Repealed by	Faversham Oyster Fishery Act 1930
Relates to	Free Fishers of Whitstable Act 1793

Status: Repealed

Text of statute as originally enacted

Faversham Oyster Fishery Act 1930
- Act of Parliament
- Parliament of the United Kingdom
- Long title: An Act to incorporate and confer powers upon the Faversham Oyster Fishery Company to provide for the transfer to and vesting in that Company of the undertaking of the Company or Fraternity of Free Fishermen and Dredgermen of the Manor and Hundred of Faversham in the County of Kent to dissolve the said Company or Fraternity and for other purposes.
- Citation: 20 & 21 Geo. 5. c. lxxiv
- Territorial extent: United Kingdom

Dates
- Royal assent: 4 June 1930
- Commencement: 4 June 1930
Other legislation
Repeals/revokes	Faversham Oyster Fishery Company Act 1840
Amended by	Faversham Oyster Fishery Company Act 2017
Relates to	Free Fishers of Whitstable Act 1793

Status: Current legislation

Text of statute as originally enacted

Faversham Oyster Fishery Company Act 2017 (Note: Section 1.)
- Act of Parliament
- Parliament of the United Kingdom
- Long title: An Act to provide for the alteration of the objects, powers and constitution of the Faversham Oyster Fishery Company; and for other purposes.
- Citation: 2017 c. i
- Territorial extent: United Kingdom

Dates
- Royal assent: 27 April 2017
- Commencement: Various (Note: Section 20.)
Other legislation
Amends	Faversham Oyster Fishery Act 1930
Relates to	Free Fishers of Whitstable Act 1793

Status: Current legislation

Text of statute as originally enacted

Whitstable became famous for its native oysters produced by the three companies in the area: The Faversham Oyster Fishery Company, the Seasalter and Ham Oyster Company and the Whitstable Oyster Fishery Company. Oysters have been farmed in Whitstable for centuries, but it was not until 1793 that the industry became highly regulated with the Act of Incorporation of the 'Company of Free Fishers and Dredgers of Whitstable' (33 Geo. 3. c. 42) and are all unusual in that they own the freehold of the seabed. But Whitstable oysters go even further back, almost two thousand years, to when the Romans discovered them and, regarding them as a delicacy, shipped them back live to Rome. They are a registered Protected Geographical Indication (PGI) product. At these companies' peak in the 1850s, they were sending as many as 80 million oysters a year to Billingsgate fish market. By then the plentiful oyster had become the food of the poor. Unfortunately the native oyster population drastically declined in the first half of the 20th century and a combination of pollution, disease, overfishing and the introduction of diseases proved fatal to the industry by the middle of the 20th century. Pacific Oysters are now farmed on the foreshore at Whitstable, owned by the Whitstable Oyster Fishery Company on a commercial scale producing up to 300 tons of sustainable shellfish per year. The farm was the subject of an investigation by the Marine Management Organisation in 2016 after allegations about the racks causing safety issues and blocking navigation for watercraft and swimmers. This ended in two independent navigational risk assessments commissioned by the MMO that concluded that the risk posed by the presence of the oyster farm remains ALARP or lower (broadly acceptable) and that the oyster farm’s activities met the requirements of the exemption relating to shellfish propagation and cultivation under the Marine Licensing (Exempted Activities) Order 2011 (SI 2011/409) as amended (Article 13).

== Governance ==
Since 1918, Whitstable has been in the constituency of Canterbury. The Member of Parliament for the constituency is Rosie Duffield, elected for the Labour Party but sitting as an independent since September 2024, who was first elected in the 2017 general election after unseating long-serving Conservative MP Julian Brazier.

Whitstable, along with Herne Bay and Canterbury, is in the City of Canterbury local government district. The town comprises the five electoral wards of Tankerton, Seasalter, Chestfield, Swalecliffe, and Gorrell. These wards have 9 of the 39 seats on the Canterbury City Council. Following the 2023 local elections, four of those seats were held by the Labour Party, 3 by the Green Party and 2 by the Liberal Democrats. Whitstable has no parish or town council. In their lieu, the Official Planning Consultee was the Whitstable Society, membership of which is open to all, until Cllr. Ben Fitter-Harding removed it in 2020.

== Geography ==
Whitstable is on the north-east Kent coast. The town lies to the east of the outlet of The Swale into the Greater Thames Estuary. The town is 3 kilometres (2 mi) west of the seaside town of Herne Bay, 8 kilometres (5 mi) north-east of the town of Faversham and 8 kilometres (5 mi) north of the city of Canterbury; several small villages lie in between. The suburbs/villages of Tankerton, Swalecliffe and Chestfield are at the eastern end of the town, Seasalter at the west, and South Street at the south. Chestfield has its own parish council. An area of protected woodland and grassland called Duncan Down lies to the south-east.

The geology of the town consists mainly of London Clay (which covers most of North Kent). Much of the centre of the town is built on low-lying marshland. Sea walls are in place to prevent coastal flooding. The land in the east is higher, with slopes down to the coast at Tankerton. The whole of the north-east Kent coast has been designated a Site of Special Scientific Interest.

An unusual shingle spit locally named "The Street" extends into the sea to the east of the harbour, formed by the local currents. A survey in 2019 discovered it is an especially heavy London clay, and is all that remains of the saltmarsh that once extended the length of the Swale. It is exposed at low tide, and visitors, ignoring the warning signs, are sometimes trapped by the advancing tide, needing to be rescued by the local RNLI lifeboat.

=== Climate ===
In East Kent, the warmest time of the year is July and August, when maximum temperatures average around 22 °C (71.6 °F). The coolest time of the year is January and February, when minimum temperatures average around 2 °C (35.6 °F). East Kent's average maximum and minimum temperatures are around 1/2 °C higher than the national average. Whitstable is sometimes warmer than other parts of Kent due to it being backed by the North Downs to the south.

East Kent's average annual rainfall is about 613 mm (24.1 in); October to January being the wettest months. The national average annual rainfall is about 870 mm (34 in). A recent drought caused Mid Kent Water to impose a hosepipe ban between August 2005 and February 2007.

The nearest Met Office average data for each month as well as the current data reported on the BBC web site are from recording stations approximately 20 miles (30 km) away to east and west and do not well represent Whitstable weather.

== Demography ==
Whitstable Compared
2001 UK Census	Whitstable	Canterbury District	England
Total population	30,195	135,278	49,138,831
Foreign born	4.5%	5.1%	9.2%
White	98%	97%	91%
Asian	0.6%	1.6%	4.6%
Black	0.2%	0.5%	2.3%
Christian	74%	73%	72%
Muslim	0.3%	0.6%	3.1%
Hindu	0.1%	0.4%	1.1%
No religion	16%	17%	15%
Over 65 years old	23%	19%	16%
Unemployed	2.5%	2.7%	3.3%

At the 2001 UK census, Whitstable area electoral wards had a population of 30,195 and a population density of 10.3 persons per hectare.

The ethnicity of the town was 98.2% white, 0.8% mixed race, 0.2% Chinese, 0.4% other Asian, 0.2% black and 0.2% other. The place of birth of residents was 95.5% United Kingdom, 0.6% Republic of Ireland, 1.2% other Western European countries, and 2.7% elsewhere. Religion was recorded as 74.8% Christian, 0.3% Muslim, 0.3% Buddhist, 0.2% Jewish, 0.1% Hindu and 0.1% Sikh. 15.8% were recorded as having no religion, 0.4% had an alternative religion and 8.1% did not state their religion.

The age distribution was 5% aged 0–4 years, 14% aged 5–15 years, 4% aged 16–19 years, 28% aged 20–44 years, 26% aged 45–64 years and 23% aged 65 years and over. The town has a high percentage of residents over 65, compared with the national average of 16%. As a seaside town, Whitstable is a popular retirement destination.

Of the town's 13,155 households, 49.0% were married couples, 7.8% were cohabiting couples and 8.0% were lone parents. 30.7% of households were individuals, and 18.0% had someone living alone at pensionable age. 26.4% of households included children aged under 16, or a person aged 16 to 18 who was in full-time education.

== Economy ==
According to the 2001 UK census, the economic activity of residents in the town aged 16–74 was 35.6% in full-time employment, 13.4% in part-time employment, 10.4% self-employed, 2.5% unemployed, 2.4% students with jobs, 3.4% students without jobs, 18.8% retired, 6.7% looking after home or family, 4.5% permanently sick or disabled and 2.3% economically inactive for other reasons. The percentage of retired people was significantly higher than the national figure of 13.5%. The unemployment rate of 2.5% was lower than the national rate of 3.3%. 12% of the town's residents aged 16–74 had a higher education qualification or the equivalent, compared to 20% nationwide.

The main activities at the harbour are fishing, fish processing, cargo handling and boat storage. The harbour area is the site for other industries such as tarmac manufacturing and a maintenance port for an offshore windfarm. Business parks located on the outskirts of the town provide premises for large retailers, offices and light industries.

The town's distinctive character and ambience has led to a strong tourist industry, which is promoted each year by the Oyster Festival. In early 2007, Canterbury City Council were planning to boost tourism by building retail developments in addition to the existing shopping centre.

The 2001 UK census reported the industry of employment of residents of Whitstable as 18% retail, 13% health and social work, 12% manufacturing, 11% education, 10% real estate, 9% construction, 7% transport and communications, 5% public administration, 5% hotels and restaurants, 4% finance, 1% agriculture and 5% other community, social or personal services. Compared to national figures, the town had a relatively high number of workers in the construction, education, and health/social care industries and a relatively low number in manufacturing, finance, and real estate. Many residents commute to work outside the town; at the 2001 census, there were 13,260 employed residents, but only 9,725 jobs within the town.

The high level of employees in teaching is possibly due to the town's proximity to Canterbury, which has three higher education establishments. The elderly population of the town has led to many health and social care jobs at local care homes and at the Whitstable and Tankerton Hospital. At the 2001 census, 1.3% of the town's population resided in a medical or care establishment, compared to the national average of only 0.8%.

== Transport ==
North-east Kent

Whitstable railway station is on the Chatham Main Line, which runs between Ramsgate in East Kent and London Victoria. Other stations on this line include Broadstairs, Margate Herne Bay, Faversham, Gillingham, Rochester and Bromley South. Whitstable is around 1 hour and 30 minutes from London Victoria, ten minutes more than in 2009 due to the introduction of HS1 services further up the line. On weekdays, during the morning and evening peaks, there is a direct service to London's Cannon Street station, provided primarily for business commuting; these trains run to Cannon Street in the morning and back in the evening. All services are operated by Southeastern.

A National Express coach service runs between London Victoria and Ramsgate.

There is a Stagecoach South East bus service, branded as the Triangle, running about every fifteen minutes to neighbouring Herne Bay and Canterbury, where many Whitstable residents go to work and shop. Route 5 runs from the town to Canterbury.

The A299 road, known as the Thanet Way, runs between Ramsgate and Faversham via Herne Bay and Whitstable; it merges with the M2 motorway at Faversham.

== Education ==
Whitstable's secondary school is The Whitstable School, formerly The Community College Whitstable. It is a secondary modern school which changed its name from Sir William Nottidge School in 1998. In 2009, 25% of its pupils gained at least five GCSEs at grades A*–C – this increased to 37% in 2011. The School was rated 'Requires Improvement' by Ofsted in March 2015.

Many pupils living in Whitstable commute to schools in other nearby towns, especially to the grammar schools in Faversham and Canterbury.

The town's public primary schools are Whitstable Junior School, Whitstable and Seasalter Church of England Junior School, Westmeads Infant School, Swalecliffe Community Primary School, St Mary's Catholic Primary School, St Alphege C of E Primary School, Joy Lane Primary School. The voluntary controlled church schools are owned by the church, but like the other schools, are administered by Kent County Council.

Whitstable Adult Education Centre runs adult learning courses.

== Culture ==
=== Events and venues ===
The longest established event is the Regatta, dating from a sailing contest between 26 boats from Whitstable and Faversham which was split into three classes (divisions) in 1792. A reporter at the scene wrote: "Much nautical skill was displayed in the maneuvering of the various squadrons. Every hoy, smack, wherry etc. in the vicinity of Whitstable was crowded with company and formed quite a fair upon the ocean." In addition, at least two of the spectating boats had bands aboard and tents were erected along the shore which was lined with spectators.

The Regatta continued to become the biggest event on the North Kent Coast in the 19th century. It has moved from the original Whitstable to Tankerton for more land based events with fairground and fireworks on the elevated Slopes. For many years run by the council, the Whitstable and Herne Bay Lions Club have taken it on in the last 31 years. Future events will be more sea borne with yachting and rowing, and plans for swimming and even the traditional greasy pole.

May Day is celebrated with the annual Jack-in-the-Green parade, with traditional English dancing throughout the town, a fair at Whitstable Castle and a maypole dance by local schoolchildren overlooking the sea. It has been run by Whitstable and Herne Bay Lions Club for 34 years.

The importance of oysters to the tradition of Whitstable is celebrated with the Oyster Festival in July each year. The nine-day festival starts with an opening parade on the nearest Saturday to St James' Day. The parade starts with the official "Landing of the Catch", followed by the procession of the oysters in a horse-drawn dray through the town, stopping to deliver the catch to local restaurants, cafes and public houses. The rest of the festival consists of entertainment for both adults and children, with local art on display around the town, and many establishments offering local fish dishes.

The Whitstable Museum and Gallery displays artefacts and portraits relating to the town's seafaring traditions, with special features on oysters, diving and shipping. In 2001, the Museum was awarded the international Nautiek Award for services to diving history.

The Playhouse Theatre Whitstable is owned and administered by theatrical group, The Lindley Players Ltd. The theatre is regularly hired out to other local groups such as The Canterbury Players, Herne Bay Operatic Society, Theatrecraft & The Deborah Capon College. More recently Nick Wilty has adopted the venue to host the OyOyster Comedy nights, attracting stars including Harry Hill, Jo Brand and Paul Merton.

The Horsebridge Arts and Community Centre opened in March 2004 as part of the Horsebridge redevelopment. Built with an "upturned boat" design, and three floors totalling 900 square metres (9,700 sq ft), the centre contains an art gallery, a performance space, art workshops, a learning area, and conference rooms. The building in 2004 won the Kent Design Award in the Town and Village Renaissance category.

There are monthly beach cleans carried out along the Whitstable sea front. They are organised by the Canterbury Council Foreshore service in conjunction with the Marine Conservation Society. The location of the beach clean alternates each month between the beach by the Neptune pub and the Seasalter end. Times and dates can be obtained for the Fore shore services or the MCS South East Groups website, calendar page.

=== Attractions and landmarks ===
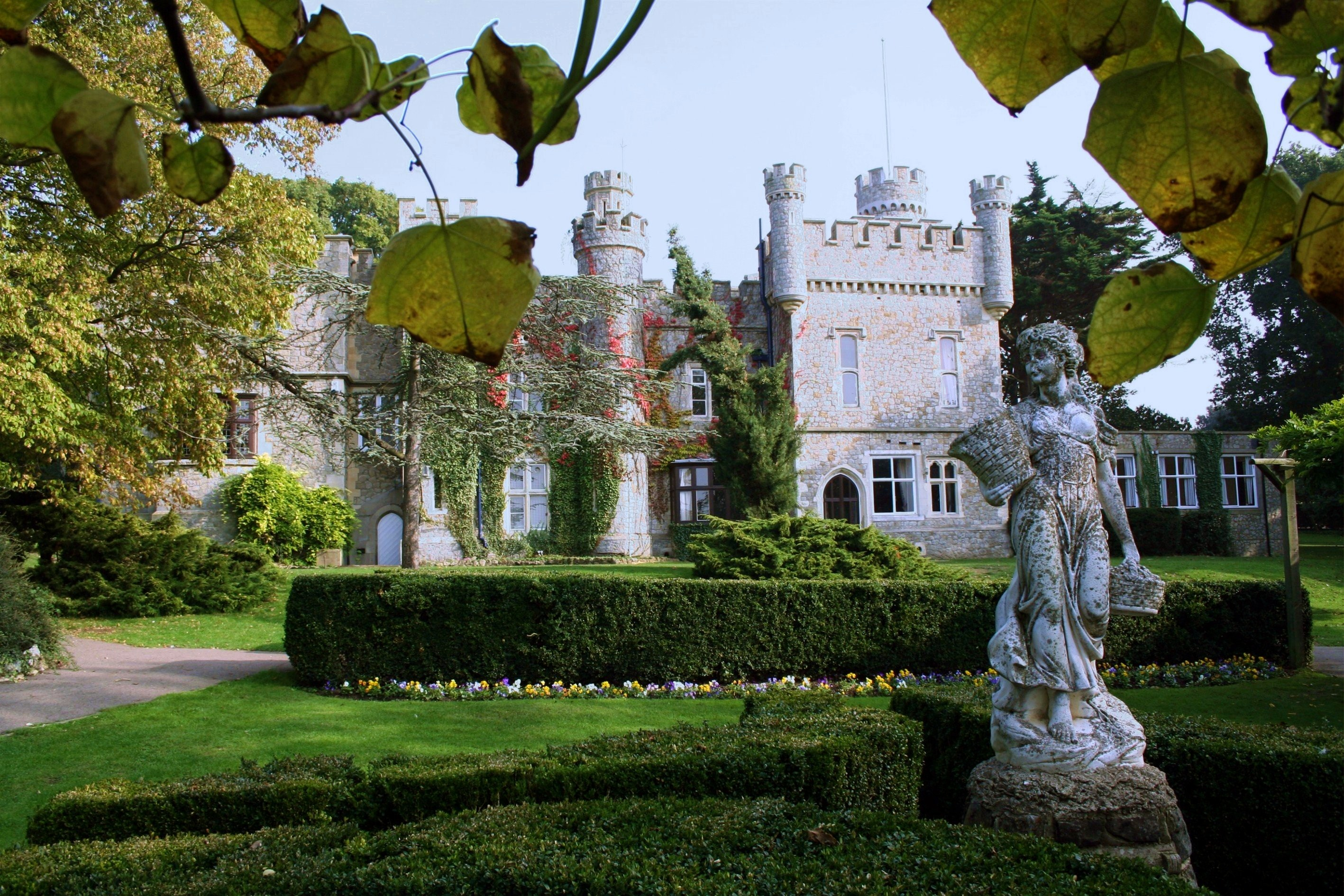
Whitstable Castle

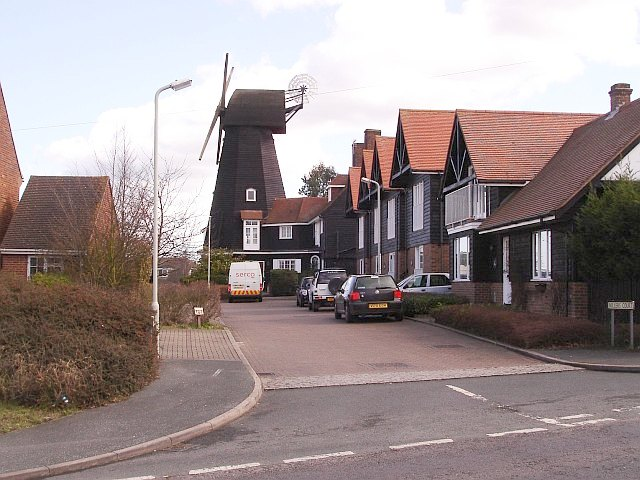
Black Mill

The town has shingle/sandy beaches flanking the harbour, where sunbathing, swimming and water sports are popular. The beaches east and west are unique amongst seaside towns in the south-east of England for having no promenade; making them generally peaceful. An exception is Long Beach to the immediate east of the harbour where there is a base for jet skis. A notable feature of Whitstable is The Street, a natural strip of shingle on clay bank which runs out to sea at right angles to the coast, for a distance of about 1/2 mile (800 m). It is the last remnant of the Swale river valley to the north of the town lost to sea erosion over millennia. Located to the east of the harbour, The Street is revealed only at low tide, when it is possible to walk out along it as well as swim either side in safe, sandy bottomed shallows. A view of The Street can be seen on the hilltop lawns of Tankerton Slopes. The Slopes are home to the largest population in England of the rare Hog's Fennel.

Whitstable Castle is situated on the border of Whitstable and the suburb of Tankerton. It was originally built as an octagonal tower in 1789 by Charles Pearson, the owner of a copperas company in the town and a future investor in the Canterbury and Whitstable Railway. However, Pearson later added to the building, developing it into a manor house. In 1836 the house, then known as Tankerton Tower, was bought by London businessman and Whig MP Wynn Ellis, who by 1842 had added a west wing, a bell tower and a lodge. The building had become known as Tankerton Castle by 1897, although it is now commonly referred to as Whitstable Castle. Now managed by the Whitstable Castle Trust, the castle grounds are a centre for community activity.

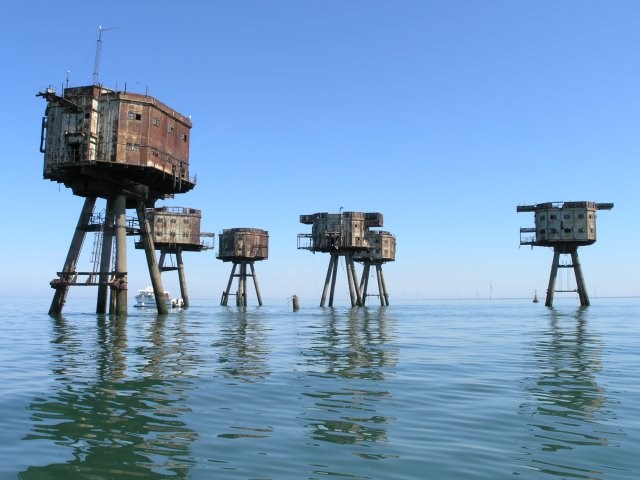
The Maunsell sea forts, 9 miles (14 km) off the coast of Whitstable

Off the coast of Whitstable is Kentish Flats offshore windfarm, consisting of 30 wind turbines, each 140 metres (459 ft) high, providing enough electricity to power 70,000 households. The now-redundant Shivering Sands and Red Sands offshore World War II sea forts are visible from the town's coast. Sailing trips are available from the harbour to the windfarm, the sea forts and a seal watching spot in the Thames Estuary.

Island Wall, the closest street to the seafront, has numerous buildings dating from the mid-19th century including the Neptune and Wall Tavern pubs, and the Dollar Row cottages, which were built from the proceeds of a salvage operation on a ship carrying silver dollars. The street is home to the Favourite, one of the few remaining Whitstable oyster yawls. Built in 1890, it is now managed by the Favourite Trust, a charitable trust who undertake fund raising to maintain the historical vessel. A traditional windmill on Borstal Hill, built in 1815, is used as a motel.

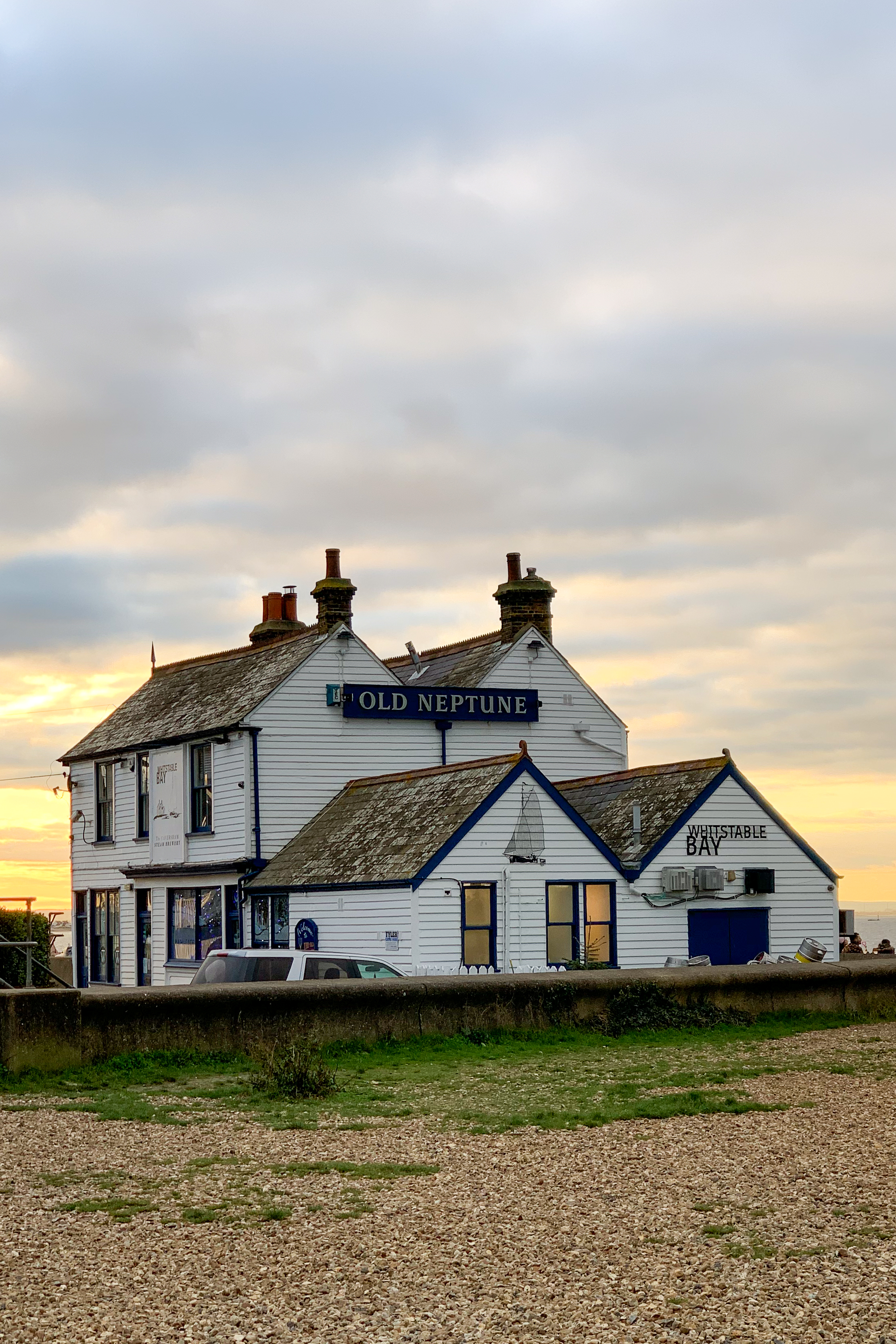
The Old Neptune pub on Whitstable seafront

The town is criss-crossed by numerous small alleys, once used by fishermen to reach the beach. Many of these are now registered as public rights of way and are still in frequent use. Squeeze Gut Alley whose name suggests (erroneously) that most people have to walk sideways due to its narrowness, is one of the more notable.

The town claims to have the largest village green in England at Duncan Down (52 acres (210,000 m^{2})).

=== Sport ===
The town is a popular destination for watersport enthusiasts. Established in 1904, the Whitstable Yacht Club is one of the oldest yacht clubs in England and takes part in local and national competitions throughout the year. Each year, the town hosts the International Waterski Championships.

In May 2007, Whitstable Town Football Club, based at the Belmont ground, won promotion from the Kent League to the Isthmian League Division One South. Whitstable Rugby Football Club 1st XV also won promotion in 2007, to the London League. The club has a 2nd XV team which play in the East Kent League 2.

Whitstable has a council-owned swimming pool and sports centre with facilities for badminton, 5-a-side football, volleyball, cricket and tennis. A 10-pin bowling centre is located next door to the swimming pool. There is also an outdoor basketball court at the Rec near the swimming pool.

Windsurfing is common off the West Quay, usually at low tide in southwesterly winds. Kite surfing has become popular in recent years, usually taking place east of the harbour, due to its flat water conditions and exposure to the open sea.

=== Local media ===
The four local newspapers are the KM Group owned Whitstable Gazette and KM Extra, YourCanterbury part of KOS Ltd. and the Northcliffe Media-owned Whitstable Times.

During the 1960s, several pirate radio stations broadcast from the nearby Shivering Sands and Red Sands offshore sea forts. These included Radio Invicta, KING Radio, Radio Sutch (launched by Screaming Lord Sutch), Radio City, and Radio 390.

Local television news programmes are BBC South East Today and ITV News Meridian.

BBC local radio station is BBC Radio Kent on 96.7 FM.

Whitstable has a local radio station in KMFM Canterbury which also serves Canterbury and Herne Bay. It was previously known as CTFM, until it was taken over by the KM Group in September 2007. County-wide station Heart Kent (formerly Invicta FM) was based on the John Wilson business park in the town. In 2019, Heart Kent was rebranded under the Heart South banner.

Whitstable also has a community radio station which broadcasts online and is known as Whitstable Bay Radio (WBR)

=== Popular culture ===
The playwright and novelist W. Somerset Maugham was sent to live with his uncle in Whitstable, at age 10, after the death of his parents. His novels Of Human Bondage (1915) and Cakes and Ale (1930) are set in the fictional town of Blackstable. It is obvious that he based this town on Whitstable, as the names and description of places around Blackstable, including The Duke of Cumberland Inn and Joy Lane, are identical to places around Whitstable.

Whitstable is the hometown of the narrator, Nancy Astley, in Sarah Waters' 1998 novel Tipping the Velvet. Whitstable also featured in the 2002 BBC drama adaptation. The Old Neptune Pub on the seafront was used as a filming location for the 2006 movie Venus, for which the actor Peter O'Toole earned an Academy Award nomination.

Whitstable features prominently in the 2021 AcornTV series Whitstable Pearl, starring Kerry Godliman, in which a restaurateur fancies herself a private detective in the seaside town.

== Notable people ==
- Hervey Alan, operatic bass
- Peter Cushing, actor, lived in the town
- Alan Davies, comedian
- Brian Haw, protester
- Val Hennessy, journalist
- Donald Hewlett, actor lived in the town
- Siobhan Hewlett, actress, writer and producer
- Harry Hill, comedian, has his primary residence in the town
- Matthew Holness, comedian and actor (Garth Marenghi's Darkplace, Man to Man with Dean Learner)
- Hugh Hopper (1945-2009), fusion jazz/rock bassist
- Paul Jewell, Liverpool born Premier League English football manager
- W. Somerset Maugham lived in Whitstable in his early years
- Katherine May, author and podcaster
- Fiona Reid, English-born Canadian actress
- Peter Shearing, former professional footballer
- Dawn Steele, Scottish actress
- Violet Wood (1899–2012), formerly the oldest documented living person in the United Kingdom, lived in the town.

== Twin towns ==
Whitstable is twinned with the following towns:

- Dainville, France
- Borken, Germany
- Říčany, Czech Republic
- Albertslund, Denmark
- Mölndal, Sweden

Whitstable has friendship links with:

- Grabow, Germany
- Sisimiut, Greenland
- Bolków, Poland
- Lviv, Ukraine
- East Renfrewshire, Scotland

== In popular culture ==
Author Russell Hoban repurposes Whitstable as "Widders Bel" in his 1980, post apocalyptic novel Riddley Walker.
