= Blean and Tyler Hill Halt railway station =

Disused railway station in Kent, England

Blean and Tyler Hill Halt
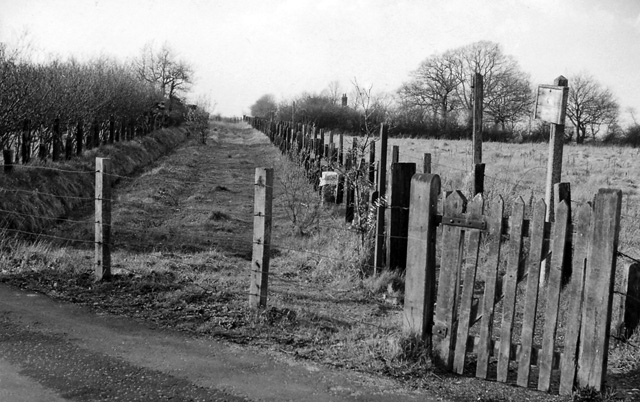
- The site of the halt, photographed in 1963

General information
- Location: Tyler Hill, Kent; England
- Coordinates: 51°18′52″N 1°03′18″E
- Grid reference: TR 130 617
- Platforms: 1

Other information
- Status: Disused

History
- Original company: South Eastern Railway
- Post-grouping: Southern Railway

Key dates
- 1 January 1908: Opened
- 1 January 1931: Closed
Location

Blean and Tyler Hill Halt was a minor station on the Canterbury and Whitstable Railway at Tyler Hill, Kent. It opened in 1908 and closed in 1931.

== History ==
Blean and Tyler Hill Halt was opened on 1 January 1908, although it did not appear in the public timetable until 13 June. The halt closed on 1 January 1931, when passenger services ceased on the Canterbury and Whitstable Railway. The station was demolished after closure and the site is now on a driveway to a private house called "The Halt".

Preceding station	Disused railways	Following station
South Street Halt	British Railways; Southern Region; Canterbury and Whitstable Railway	Canterbury West
