= Whitstable Museum and Gallery =

Heritage centre in Whitstable, Kent, UK

Coordinates: 51°21′22″N 1°01′28″E

Whitstable Museum
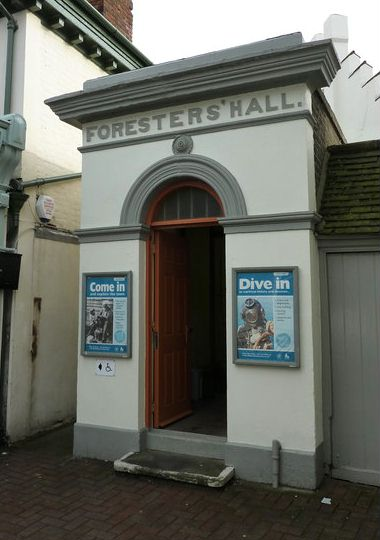
- Museum entrance
- Established: 1985
- Location: 5A Oxford Street, Whitstable, Kent CT5 1DB, United Kingdom
- Type: heritage centre; seafaring traditions museum
- Collection size: Diving, oyster trade, shipbuilding trade, Peter Cushing, steam locomotive
- Curator: Whitstable Volunteers
- Public transit access: Rail: Whitstable railway station Buses: National Express, Stagecoach
- Website: www.whitstablemuseum.org

Whitstable Museum is a heritage centre in Whitstable, Kent, displaying Invicta, one of the world's oldest steam engines, the history of the local oyster trade, and historical diving equipment.

== History ==
The present museum was established in 1985. The museum received the Nautiek Award, for services to diving history, in 2001; the first time the award had been given to a UK establishment. In 2015, the museum was reopened following a refurbishment, part-funded by a £15,000 grant from Arts Council England.

The building's small doorway opens up into a large hall of displays. In 1881, the Ancient Order of Foresters bought the building, and inscribed "Foresters' Hall" over the door.

== Exhibits ==
The museum has collections and displays on themes of the natural world, local oyster trade, early diving and the actor, Peter Cushing, who lived locally, as well as displays on the 1953 floods, shipwrecks and maritime archaeology. The collections are held under the following headings: social history, science and technology, maritime, land transport, fine art, decorative and applied art, archives and archaeology.

The museum displays the unique 1830 steam locomotive Invicta, which operated on the Canterbury and Whitstable Railway, and Whitstable's first horse-drawn fire pump, which required twenty-six volunteers to operate. In 1867, the Norwich Union Fire Insurance Society donated it to the town. The diving display shows standard diving dress with Siebe Gorman helmet and the traditional red bonnet to protect the head against the helmet (see image below). The museum also contains relics from the East Indiaman Hindostan, which wrecked at Margate in January 1803.

In 2010, the BBC chose the pudding pan pots from Whitstable Museum as objects illustrating the history of Kent as part of the A History of the World in 100 Objects project.

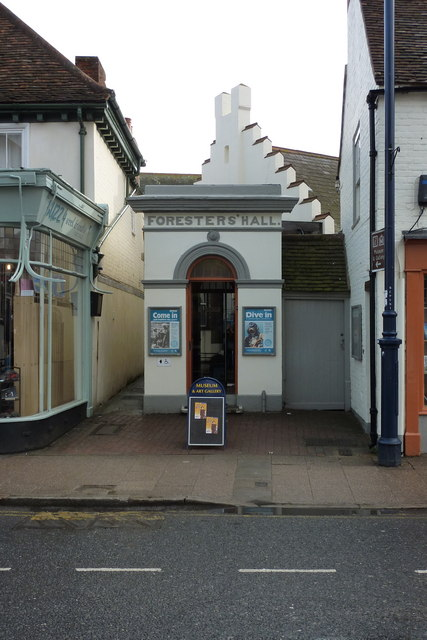
Museum entrance

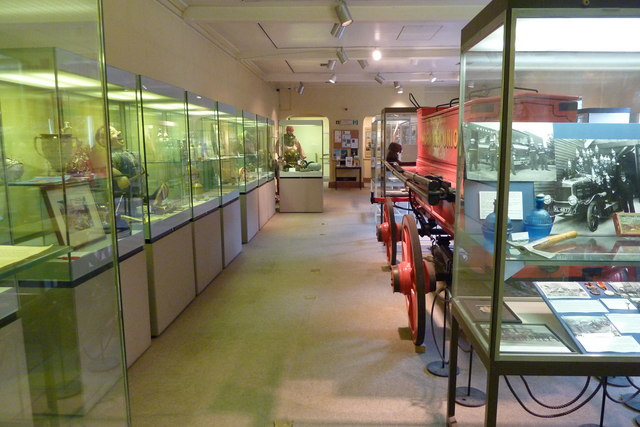
Display hall, looking towards entrance

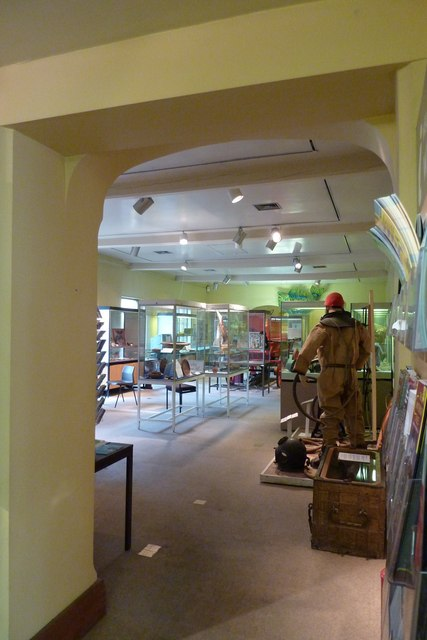
Display hall, looking from entrance

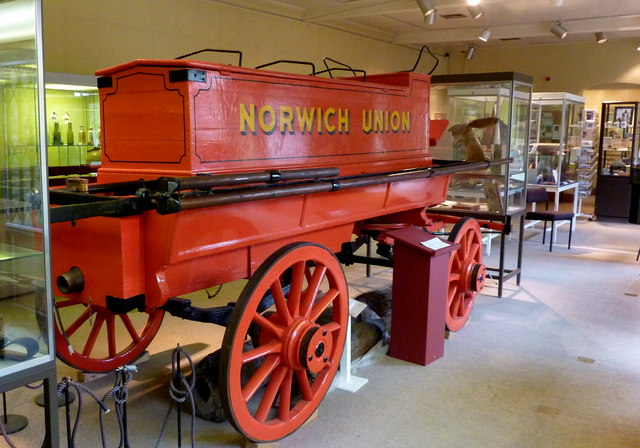
1867 fire pump

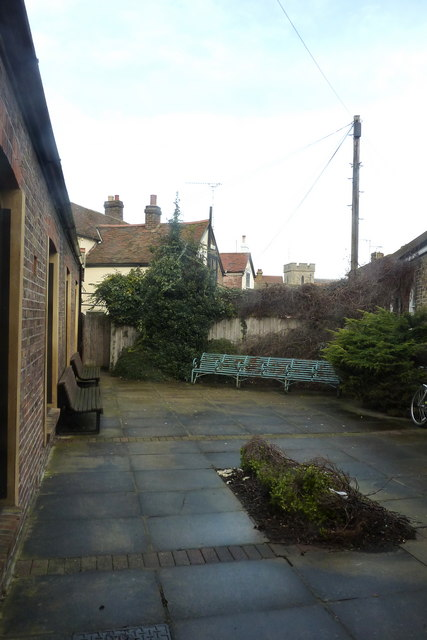
Courtyard garden

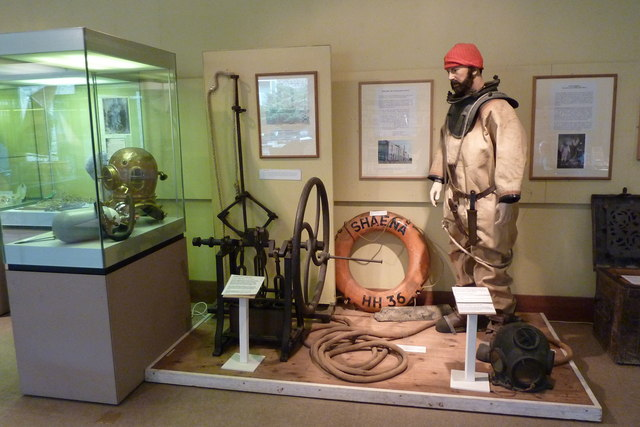
Diving display

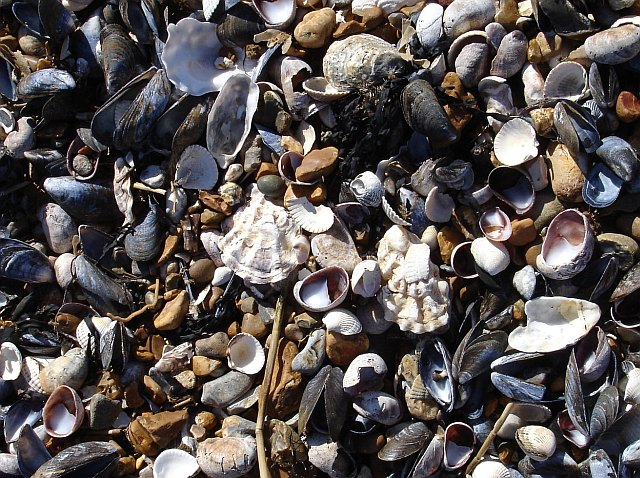
Slipper limpets, blamed for the previous decline of the Whitstable oyster trade

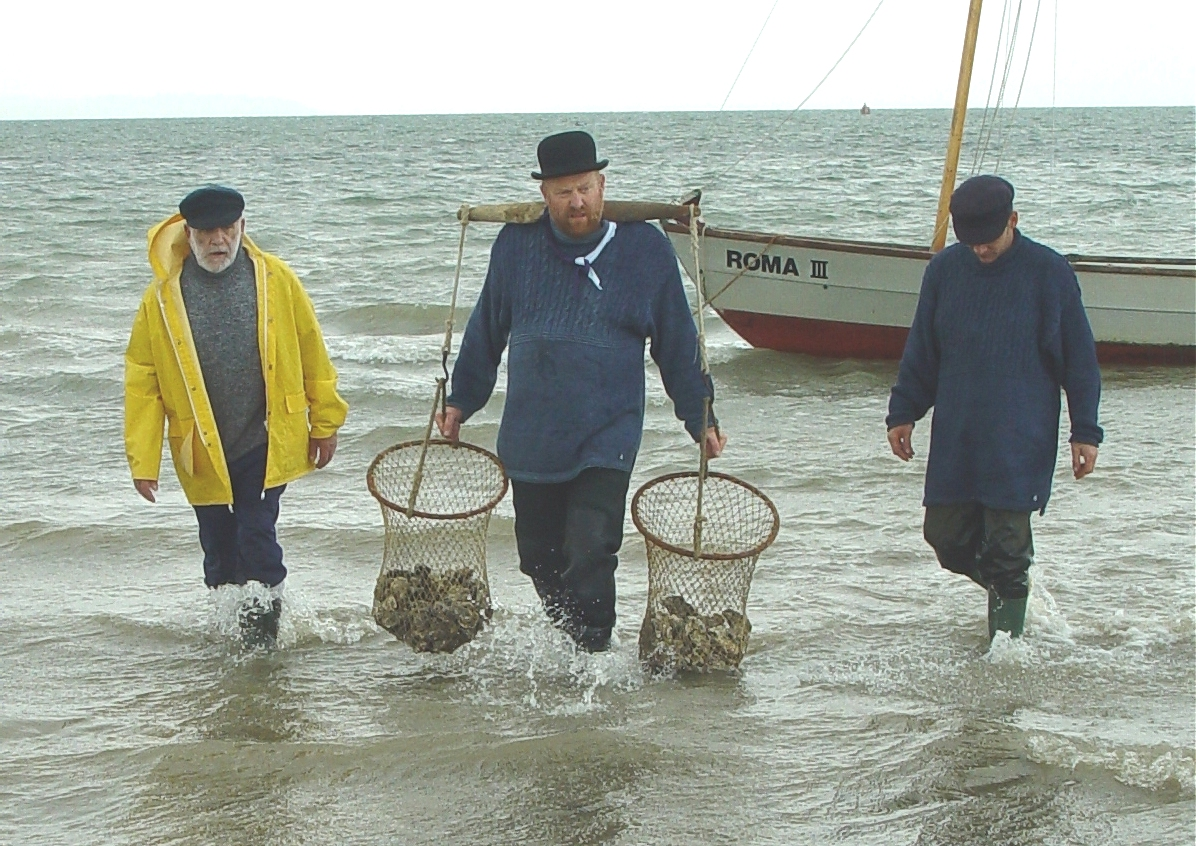
Modern oyster fishing at Whitstable, 2007

== Gallery ==
The collection includes: ship paintings on the theme of international and local trading links; town, shore and coastal views; the work of local artists; and artworks borrowed from an international network of galleries.

== Events ==
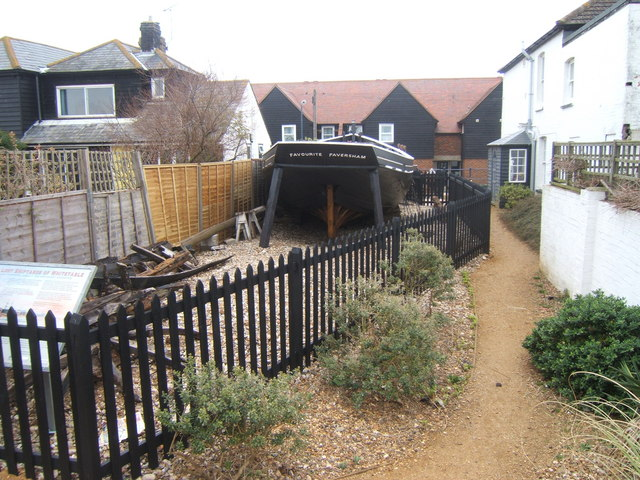
Oyster yawl Favourite.

=== Exhibitions ===
There are about six exhibitions per year: some local, some which have toured nationally, and some with associated public events. In 2001, there was a special exhibition about art and water. In March 2002, there was an exhibition in which visitors could handle historic diving equipment and watch films about diving. There was a 2009−2010 exhibition on the last oyster yawl, Favourite, and a Girl Guides exhibition in 2010. The museum takes part in the annual Whitstable Oyster Festival by hosting interactive exhibitions. In September 2009, the museum had a World War II frontline exhibition.

== Educational space ==
The museum re-allocated some of its space for education in 2009 on its frontage with Oxford Street. In the event the Council voted in favour of this proposal.
