= Canterbury North Lane railway station =

Disused railway station in Kent, UK

North Lane

General information
- Location: Canterbury, Kent; England
- Coordinates: 51°17′10″N 1°04′34″E
- Grid reference: TR 146 586

Other information
- Status: Disused

History
- Original company: Canterbury and Whitstable Railway
- Pre-grouping: South Eastern Railway

Key dates
- 3 May 1830: Opened
- 1846: Closed to passengers
- 1891: Closed
Location

North Lane railway station was the original station of the Canterbury and Whitstable Railway in Canterbury, Kent, United Kingdom. It opened in 1830, closed to passengers in 1846 and to freight in 1891.

== History ==
The station opened with the Canterbury and Whitstable Railway on 3 May 1830. The South Eastern Railway took over the Canterbury and Whistable in 1844. The whole line was upgraded to allow full operation by locomotives and passenger services were diverted to Canterbury West in 1846. North Lane station closed to freight in 1891. The site of the station subsequently became a coal depot forming part of the goods yard of Canterbury West station until the 1980s. Since closure of the coal depot the land was sold and is now covered by housing development although the former weighbridge house remains.

Preceding station	Disused railways	Following station
Terminus	South Eastern Railway; Canterbury and Whitstable Railway	Whitstable Harbour
