= Tankerton =

Suburb of Whitstable, Kent, England

Coordinates: 51.364°N 1.046°E

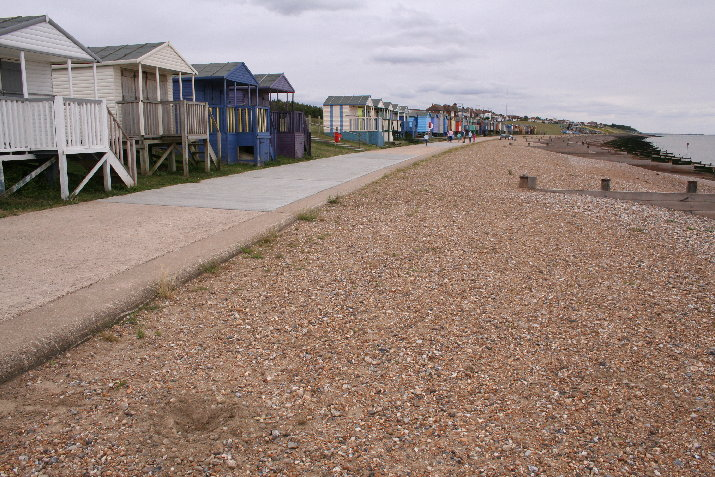
- Tankerton beach on the borders of Swalecliffe

- Location within Kent
- Population: 4,613 (2011)
- OS grid reference: TR120669
- District: City of Canterbury
- Shire county: Kent
- Region: South East
- Country: England
- Sovereign state: United Kingdom
- Post town: Whitstable
- Postcode district: CT5
- Dialling code: 01227
- Police: Kent
- Fire: Kent
- Ambulance: South East Coast
- UK Parliament: Canterbury

Tankerton (formerly Tankerton-on-Sea) is a suburb of Whitstable in Kent in south-east England. It was designed in the late 19th century as the train network brought holidaymakers to the sea. It gives its name to a ward of Canterbury City Council.

== History ==
The place-name 'Tankerton' is first attested in The Book of Fees for 1242, where it appears as Tangrenton. The name means 'the town or settlement of Tancred's people'.

Tankerton-on-Sea was a commercial development by the Tankerton Estate Company in the late 19th century, and was designed with a grid of streets leading from the shoreline. In 1890 the Tankerton Estate, including Tankerton Tower (now known as Whitstable Castle) was purchased for development by Charles Newton-Robinson, a road was built, the land was divided into plots and sold at auctions. The Tankerton Estates still exist and are managed by County Estate Agents in Whitstable.

Formerly Tankerton's coastline included a small pier, built in 1894, but this no longer exists, having been demolished in the 1910s.

In 1926 John Adam Derham was shot in a bungalow called 'Stella Maris' in Tankerton in a quarrel with his former friend and fellow Old Etonian Francis Austin Smith. The quarrel was about Derham's relationship with Smith's wife Kathleen, who was present. Smith, who was defended by Sir Edward Marshall Hall, was tried for murder, but found not guilty, though he was sentenced to 12 months hard labour on a lesser charge.

In July 2018, the wreck of a Tudor era merchant ship appeared in the sand. One timber of her hull was felled in 1531. She measures 12m x 5m, and had a capacity of 100 to 200 tons. She is thought to have been in the Copperas trade. The wreck was discovered by local history volunteers, who reported it to Historic England. They commissioned a report from Wessex Archaeology. The government has now listed the vessel as the only wreck of its kind in south-east England.

== Environment ==
The slopes to the shore are a site of special scientific interest (SSSI) because they support a population of Fisher's estuarine moth, Gortyna borelii lunata, whose sole larval food-plant is the large umbellifer hog's fennel (Peucedanum officinale) which grows well there.

Tankerton has a Blue Flag beach and a Seaside Award, certified for high environmental standards.

A shingle "spit" is surrounded by areas of colourful red, green and brown seaweeds and beds of peacock worms with their beautiful whorls of tentacles, it goes about half a mile (750m) out to sea and exposed at low tide and is part of a Marine Protected Area called "The Swale Estuary Marine Conservation Zone"

== Economy ==
The economy is based around tourism. The little wooden beach huts at the base of the slopes are currently highly desirable, and notable owners have included Tracey Emin, who sold hers to Charles Saatchi for £75,000. Seaview Caravan Holiday Park adjoins Tankerton, and formerly also contained a large number of chalets, as well as static caravans and camping. It is one of the largest holiday parks on the North Kent coast

== Demography ==
At the 2001 UK census, the Tankerton electoral ward had a population of 4583. The ethnicity was 98.7% white, 0.4% mixed race, 0.6% Asian, 0.2% black and 0.1% other. The place of birth of residents was 95.3% United Kingdom, 0.7% Republic of Ireland, 1.3% other Western European countries, and 2.7% elsewhere. Religion was recorded as 80.2% Christian, 0.4% Buddhist, 0% Hindu, 0.1% Sikh and 0.2% Muslim. 12% were recorded as having no religion, 0.4% had an alternative religion and 6.6% did not state their religion.

The economic activity of residents aged 16–74 was 34.3% in full-time employment, 12.6% in part-time employment, 11.3% self-employed, 1.9% unemployed, 2.2% students with jobs, 3.2% students without jobs, 22.3% retired, 5.8% looking after home or family, 4% permanently sick or disabled and 2.4% economically inactive for other reasons. The industry of employment of residents was 17% retail, 10.9% manufacturing, 8.2% construction, 9.9% real estate, 13% health and social work, 13.2% education, 6.9% transport and communications, 5.9% public administration, 4.2% hotels and restaurants, 4% finance, 1.2% agriculture and 5.6% other. Of the ward's residents aged 16–74, 20.6% had a higher education qualification or the equivalent, compared with 19.9% nationwide.

== Gallery ==
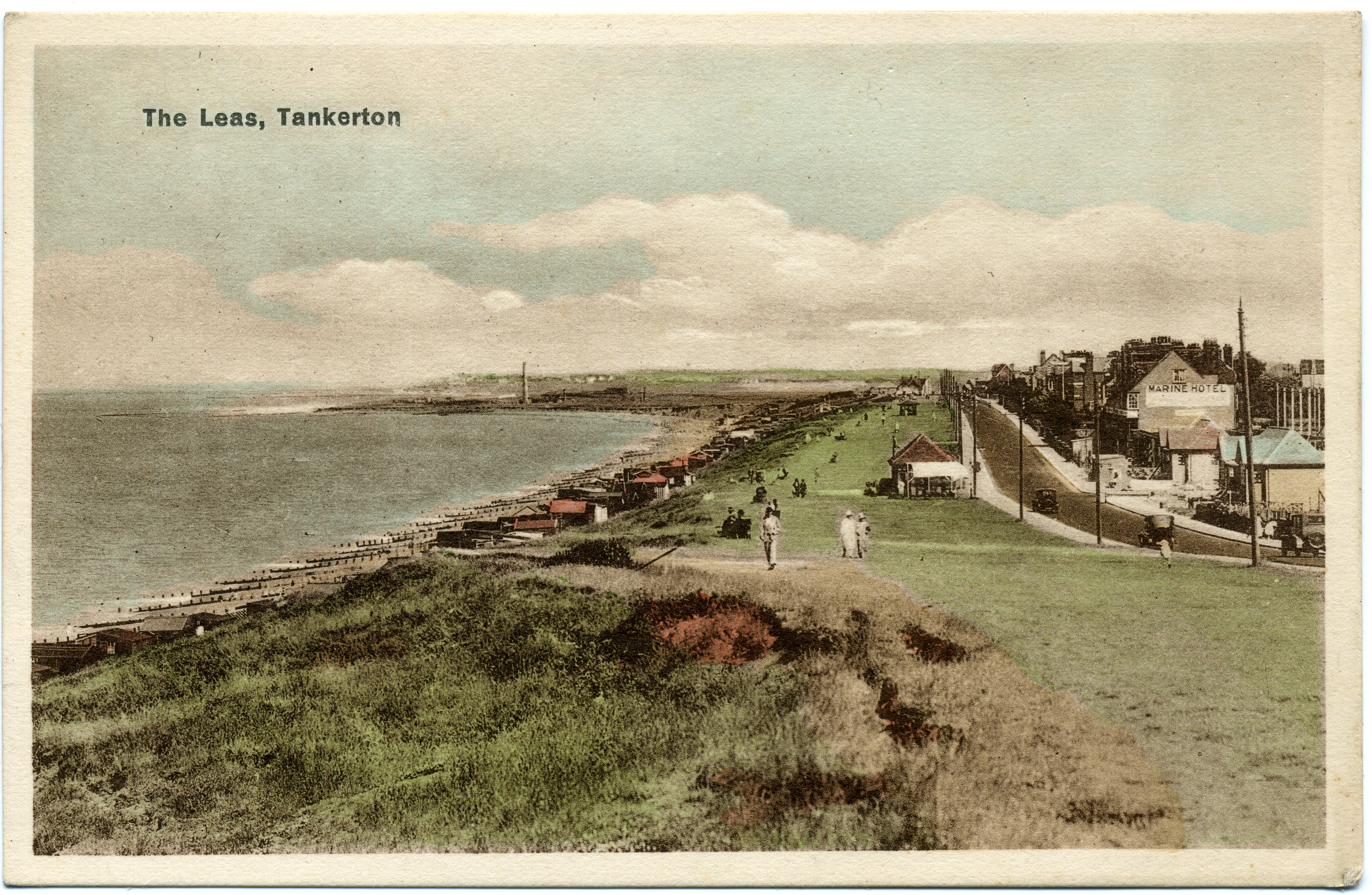
Tinted photograph on postcard dated around 1905-1914 showing "The Leas"

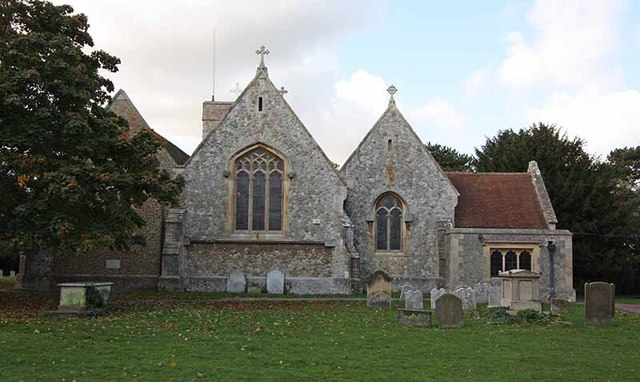
All Saints' Church

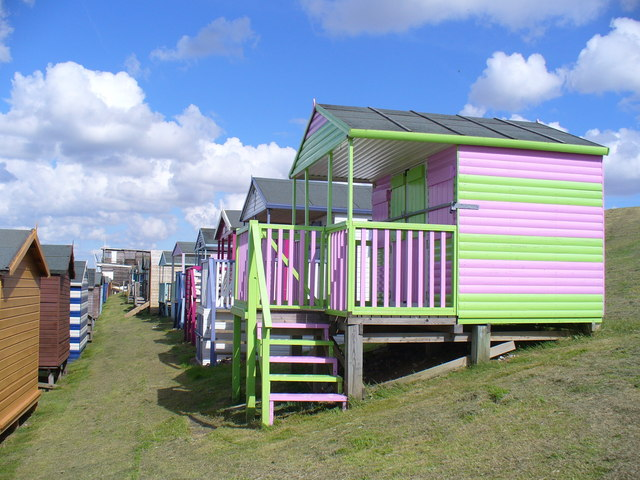
Colourful rows of wooden huts on the grassy slopes of "Tankerton slopes" below Marine Parade

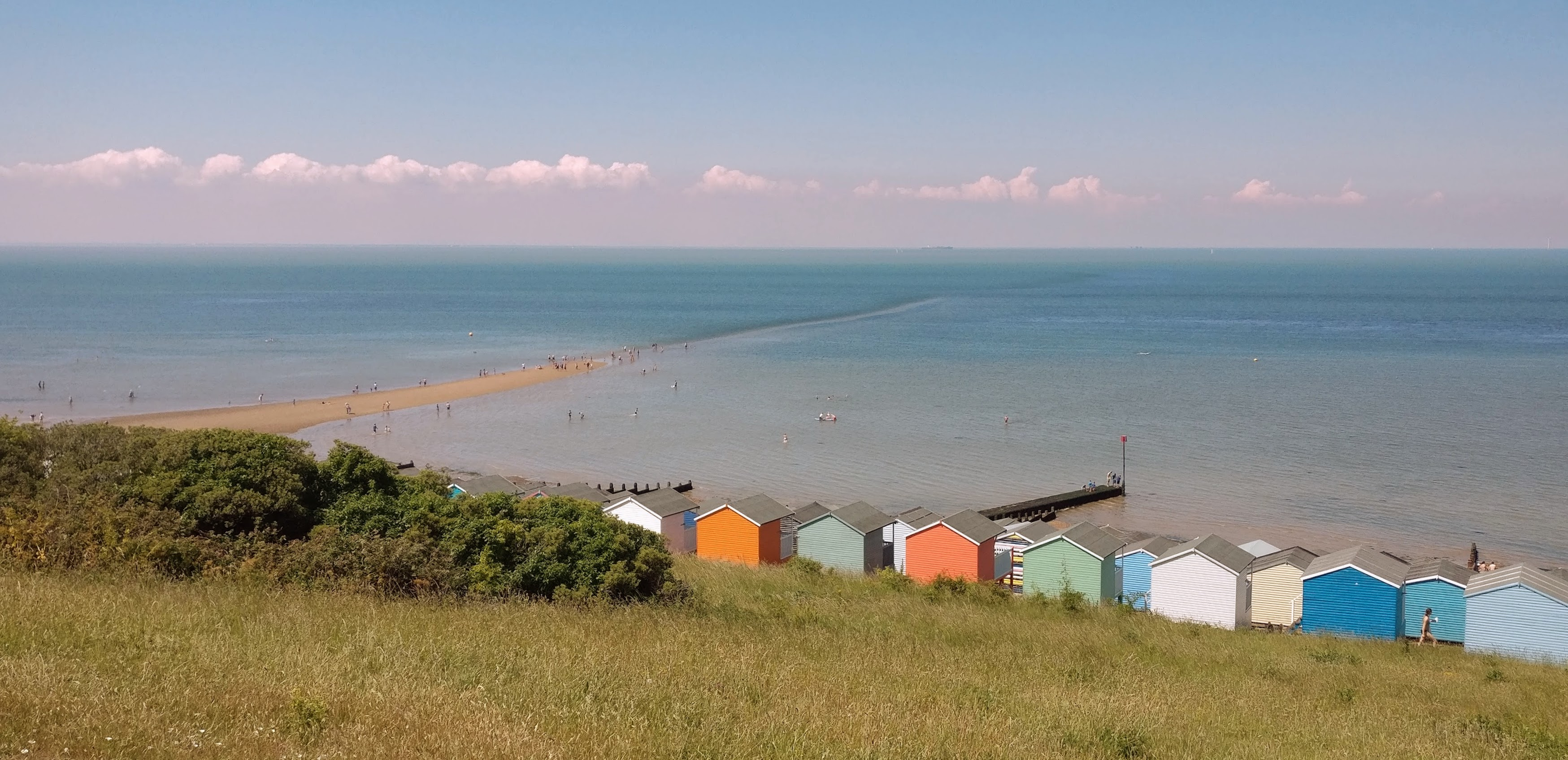
View of "The Street" taken from Tankerton Slopes looking toward the Isle of Sheppy

== Sport ==
- Every Saturday morning at 9am Tankerton seafront hosts the "Whitstable" Parkrun as of 25th October 2026 it has had 777 runs there.
- Tankerton FC is the local football club

== See also ==
- Swalecliffe
