= Canterbury and Whitstable Railway =

Early British railway line, opened in 1830

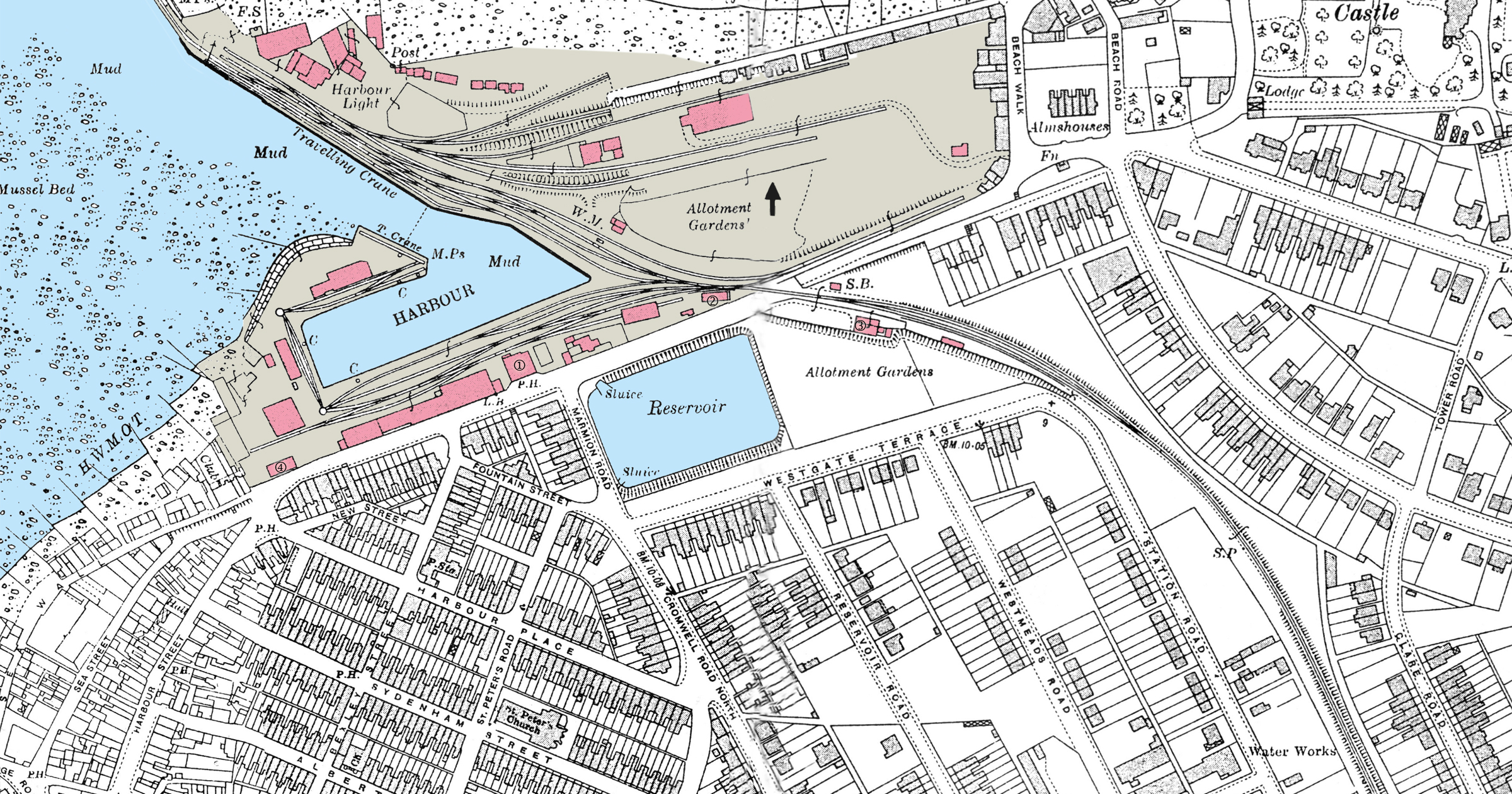
- The northern terminus at Whitstable Harbour on 1938 map

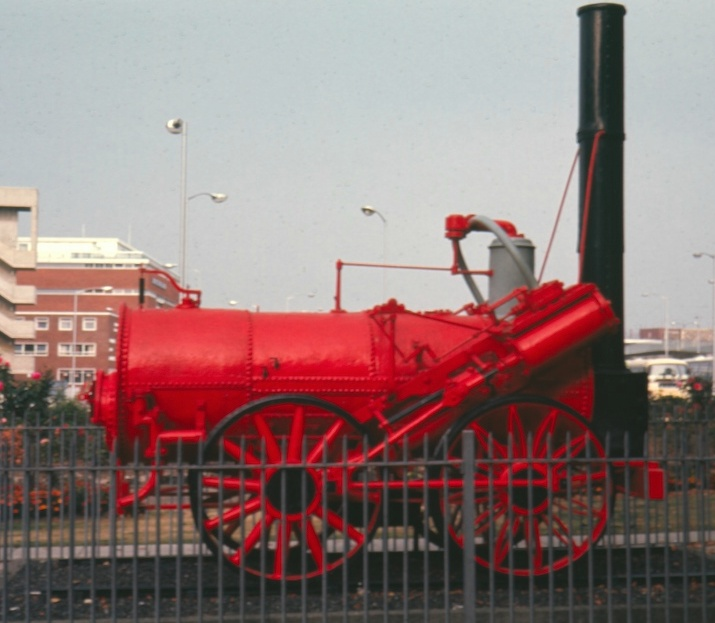
- Invicta preserved at Canterbury in the 1970s

Overview
- Locale: Kent, England
- Dates of operation: 1830–1953
- Successor: South Eastern Railway

Technical
- Track gauge: 4 ft 8 1/2 in (1,435 mm)
- Length: 6 miles 0 chains (9.66 km)

The Canterbury and Whitstable Railway, sometimes referred to colloquially as the "Crab and Winkle Line", was an early British railway that opened in 1830 between Canterbury and Whitstable in the county of Kent, England.

== Early history ==
There are a number of other claimants to the title "first railway in Britain", including the Middleton Railway, the Swansea and Mumbles Railway and the Surrey Iron Railway amongst others.

Samuel Lewis in his 'A Topographical Dictionary of England' in 1848, called it the first railway in South of England.

Canterbury and Whitstable Railway Act 1825
- Act of Parliament
- Parliament of the United Kingdom
- Long title: An Act for making and maintaining a Railway or Tram Road from the Sea Shore, at or near Whitstable, in the County of Kent, to or near to the City of Canterbury, in the said County.
- Citation: 6 Geo. 4. c. cxx

Dates
- Royal assent: 10 June 1825

Text of statute as originally enacted

In 1823, William James visited Canterbury. He suggested to Canterbury City Council that a railway to link Canterbury and the Thames Estuary would help alleviate traffic problems in the city. The initial act of Parliament for the construction of the line, the Canterbury and Whitstable Railway Act 1825 (6 Geo. 4. c. cxx), was passed on 10 June 1825. Three further acts in 1827, 1828 and 1835 allowed for the issue of a further £80,000 of stock. From the beginning, the Canterbury and Whitstable Railway was a public railway, intended for passengers as well as freight. Indeed, the world's first season ticket was issued for use on the line in 1834, to take Canterbury passengers to the Whitstable beaches for the summer season. Unlike the Liverpool and Manchester Railway which opened four months later, it used cable haulage by stationary steam engines over much of its length, with steam locomotives restricted to the level stretch.

Until the early 19th century, Canterbury's line of supply for goods had been along the River Stour which flows to Pegwell Bay, near Ramsgate on the eastern coast of Kent. Although this is only seventeen miles (27 km) as the crow flies, the meandering river journey is around seventy miles (110 km). The river was continually silting up, and the cost of dredging such a length was prohibitive. Although turnpikes had been built, four or five carts were needed to carry the load of a single barge.

Whitstable, on the coast about seven miles (11 km) due north, was at that time a small fishing village and port with a trade in iron pyrites from the Isle of Sheppey. The idea for the line came from William James who surveyed the route and produced plans for improving the harbour. The immediate problem was that the land between Whitstable and Canterbury rose to a height of two hundred feet (61 m) and railway haulage on steep gradients was technically very difficult at that time. The only alternative would have been a much longer route through Sturry, Herne and Swalecliffe and land acquisition would have been a major cost.

Accordingly, the direct route was chosen, with three steep gradients, two of them to be worked by ropes from stationary steam engines at Clowes Wood and Tyler Hill. From Canterbury North Lane station, the line climbed for 1 mile 70 chains (3.02 km) at 1 in 46 to Tyler's Hill, where there were two 25 horsepower (19 kW) winding engines. At Tyler Hill, there was an 828-yard (757 m) tunnel. The gradient eased to 1 in 750 for a further 1 mile 10 chains (1.81 km) to the summit of the line at Clowes Wood, where there was a 15 horsepower (11 kW) winding engine. The line descended for 1 mile (1.61 km) at 1 in 31, followed by a level stretch of 1 mile 20 chains (2.01 km) before another descent at 1 in 53 for 40 chains (0.80 km) and a final level section of 20 chains (0.40 km) into Whitstable, giving a total length of 6 miles (9.66 km).

Canterbury and Whitstable Railway Act 1827
- Act of Parliament
- Parliament of the United Kingdom
- Long title: An Act to authorize the Company of Proprietors of the Canterbury and Whitstable Railway to vary the Line of the Railway, to raise a further Sum of Money tor completing their Works, and to alter and enlarge the Powers of the Act passed for making and maintaining the said Railway.
- Citation: 7 & 8 Geo. 4. c. xi

Dates
- Royal assent: 2 April 1827

Text of statute as originally enacted

Canterbury and Whitstable Railway Act 1828
- Act of Parliament
- Parliament of the United Kingdom
- Long title: An Act to authorize the Company of Proprietors of the Canterbury and Whitstable Railway to raise a further Sum of Money for completing the Undertaking; and for enlarging and amending the Powers of the Acts passed for making and maintaining the said Railway and Works connected therewith.
- Citation: 9 Geo. 4. c. xxix

Dates
- Royal assent: 9 May 1828

Text of statute as originally enacted

Canterbury and Whitstable Railway Act 1835
- Act of Parliament
- Parliament of the United Kingdom
- Long title: An Act for enlarging and amending the Powers and Provisions of the Acts passed for making and maintaining a Railway or Tramroad from the Sea Shore at or near Whitstable in the County of Kent to or near to the City of Canterbury, and the Works connected therewith; and to authorize the Company of Proprietors to raise a further Sum of Money.
- Citation: 5 & 6 Will. 4. c. lxxxii

Dates
- Royal assent: 21 July 1835

Text of statute as originally enacted

Construction began in 1825 with George Stephenson as the engineer, with the assistance of John Dixon as resident engineer and Joseph Locke in charge of track. In 1827, following the boring of Tyler Hill Tunnel, work stopped through a lack of funds. Robert Stephenson took charge. Money was raised to enable the completion of the line. Dixon left the company, being replaced by Joshua Richardson. The promoters returned to Parliament three more times to obtain authorisation for the raising of additional funds, obtaining the Canterbury and Whitstable Railway Act 1827 (7 & 8 Geo. 4. c. xi), the Canterbury and Whitstable Railway Act 1828 (9 Geo. 4. c. xxix) and the Canterbury and Whitstable Railway Act 1835 (5 & 6 Will. 4. c. lxxxii). The construction of Whitstable Harbour, under the direction of Thomas Telford, was completed in 1832.

The line finally opened on 3 May 1830, with a single track throughout and passing loops at Clowes Wood and the entrance to Tyler Hill tunnel. The track consisted of 28 pounds per yard (14 kg/m) fifteen-foot (4.6 m) fish-bellied iron rails, laid on wooden sleepers at three-foot (0.91 m) intervals, the more usual alternative of stone blocks being considered too expensive. Initially, Stephenson had recommended the use of stationary engines for the three inclines, with horses for the level sections. However, the promoters insisted on use of a locomotive for the least difficult incline, and Invicta was procured from Robert Stephenson and Company, and it was brought to Whitstable by sea. Unfortunately, the short gradient from Whitstable proved too much for it, and a third stationary engine was installed at Bogshole. The original Whitstable Harbour station was north Harbour Street at Whitstable harbour. This caused problems as trains standing at the station held up shunting operations. For the first few years after opening, passengers were carried in open wagons that formed mixed trains.

Canterbury and Whitstable Railway, shown with other railway lines in Kent

The line was visited by Isambard Kingdom Brunel in 1835. The purpose of his visit was to conduct some experiments with a view to silencing some of the criticism he had received in relation to his proposals for the Great Western Railway, particularly the perceived problems of working a tunnel on a steep gradient, which Brunel wished to do at Box Tunnel.

Also in 1835, Invicta was modified in order to improve its performance. The modification was unsuccessful and led to the locomotive being taken out of service and trains being hauled only by the stationary engines. in 1838, the line was leased to Nicholson & Bayless. The C&WR tried to sell Invicta in 1839 in order to clear some of its debts, but no buyer was found. In 1839, passenger services were five daily. Nicholson and Bayless went bankrupt in 1841 and the line was advertised to let.

Invicta was later given to the Canterbury City Corporation, and for many years stood on a plinth in the Dane John Gardens beside the Riding Gate. Invicta was then displayed, cosmetically restored, at the Canterbury Heritage Museum until 2018 when the museum closed. In 2019, Invicta was moved to the Whitstable Museum and Gallery and is now on display there.

== South Eastern Railway ==
The line was bedevilled by financial problems and was facing bankruptcy when the South Eastern Railway, which had received royal assent for the South Eastern Railway Act 1844 (7 & 8 Vict. c. lxix), agreed to take it over, operating it in isolation from their own line. Invicta by now was virtually useless and horse traction was being used.

When the South Eastern Railway's own network eventually reached Canterbury in 1846, it decided to convert the line for use with its own locomotives throughout, after upgrading the track using standard rails of 70 pounds per yard (35 kg/m). Under George Stephenson's influence, the track had been built to standard gauge, but the loading gauge was small, the height of Tyler Hill Tunnel being only twelve feet (3.66 m) and the South Eastern locomotives were modified with shorter chimneys and lowered boilers. Tayleur's 119 Class 0-6-0 locomotives were used. Passenger services in 1846 were six trains daily, with five on Sundays. Canterbury North Lane station closed to passengers in 1846 and Canterbury West subsequently served the line.

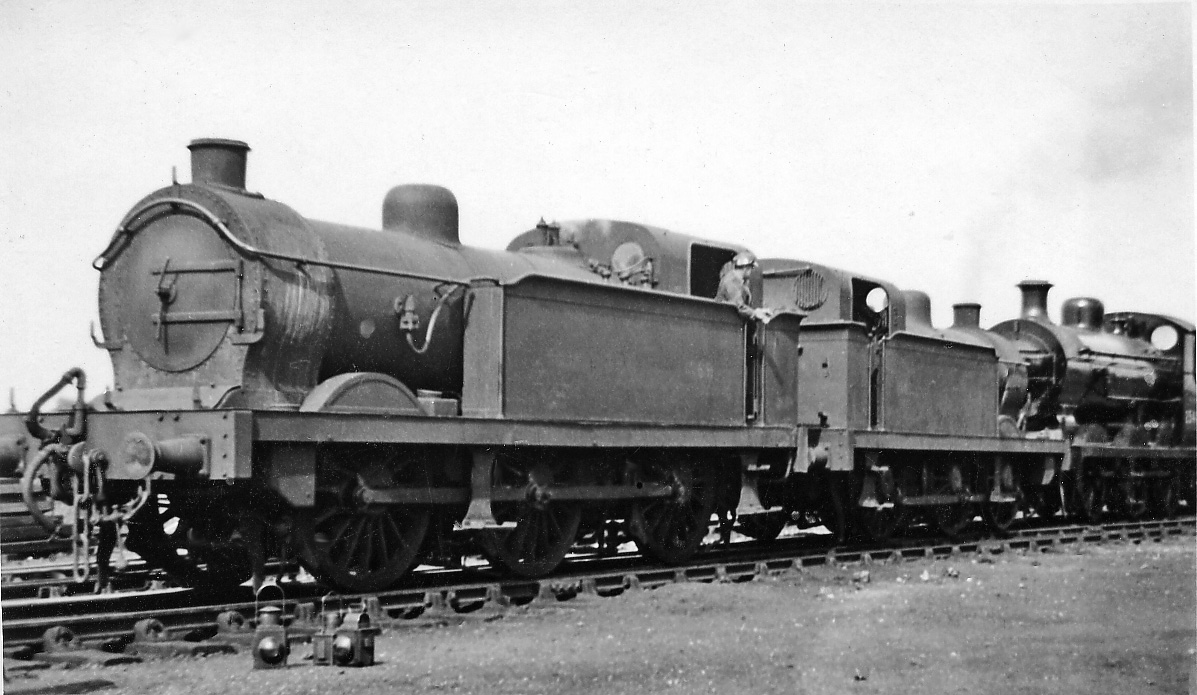
Two specially cut down SER locos for Tyler Hill Tunnel

The line was never prosperous, even under South Eastern management, and there was a new setback when the London, Chatham and Dover Railway opened in 1860 offering a better passenger service from Whitstable to London. Sunday trains were withdrawn in 1860. The platform at Whitstable Harbour station was extended in the mid-1870s to take three carriages. In 1883, two Stirling O class 0-6-0 locomotives received cut down cabs to enable them to work the line. These were replaced by four Stirling R class 0-6-0T locomotives in 1891, which worked the line until closure. Canterbury North Lane closed to freight in 1891. A new station opened at Whitstable Harbour on 3 June 1895. It was located south of Harbour Street thus enabling uninterrupted shunting in the harbour area. In 1898, Sunday trains were reinstated, running during summer only.

In 1902, work started on building a spur line at Whitstable to connect with the Herne Bay to Faversham line and a bay platform at Whitstable Town station, but the work was stopped when the Board of Trade demanded major improvements to the C&W before they would approve the new connection. In 1906, eleven trains a day were run. A halt was opened at Blean and Tyler Hill on 1 January 1908, appearing in timetables from 13 June. South Street Halt opened on 1 July 1911, and Tankerton Halt opened on 1 July 1914. The latter was adjacent to Whitstable Town station and was linked by a footpath. The service in 1914 was eleven trains a day. During the 1920s, the service was eight or nine trains a day. In 1930, there were six trains daily, with ten on Sundays.

In 1923, the line became part of the Southern Railway and like many other lines around the country it suffered from competition from bus services. Passenger services were withdrawn after 1 January 1931, due to falling numbers of passengers - from 51,000 in 1925 to 31,000 in 1927 and 23,000 in 1929. There were up to four freight trains daily at this time. The signal box at Whitstable closed on 11 February 1931 and the branch was worked as a siding from then on. It continued to carry coal, grain and roadstone, with munitions to the harbour during World War II. By 1948, when it became part of British Railways, Whitstable Harbour had fallen into disuse and what was left of the line's trade had disappeared.

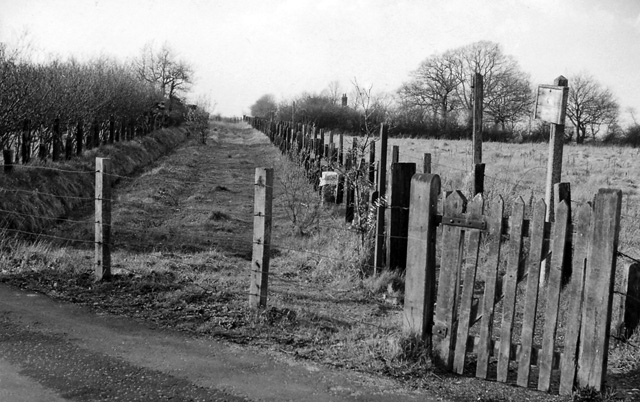
Site of Blean & Tyler Hill Halt in 1963

== Closure ==
The final scheduled freight train ran on 29 November 1952. The line closed with effect from 1 December 1952, when R Class locomotive 31010 hauled two brake vans, although there was a short reprieve during the floods of February 1953, the line being reopened from 5 February to 1 March in order for traffic to bypass the main line between Whitstable and Faversham damaged in the flood. Afterwards, track was lifted almost immediately and the associated infrastructure was removed.

== Surviving infrastructure ==
All traces of the Whitstable Harbour stations have been removed and the sites are occupied by public toilets and a medical centre, respectively. The concrete base of the former goods shed that stood between the mid-1920s and 2009 is still visible adjacent to the harbour, with the former entrance gates still displaying the initials "SE&CR" (South Eastern & Chatham Railway). The bridges crossing Teynham Road and the mainline were removed in the 1950s, although their abutments are still in place. The famous bridge at Old Bridge Road (previously Church Road) was demolished in 1969. The track bed leading from the site of the bridge adjacent to Whitstable railway station to the site of South Street Halt was surfaced in 1983 as a designated footpath and cycle track. There is no trace of South Street Halt, although remains of the level crossing gates were visible until the early 1980s. The railway embankment can be clearly seen from the adjacent cycle route bridge as it crosses fields and is cut through by the A299 road.

A bridge remains near Bogshole Brook, which dates from the line's construction, although it was almost certainly reconstructed c.1846. A section of trackbed through Clowes Wood is also a footpath where the site of the winding house can be found. The site of Blean & Tyler Hill Halt is occupied by the driveway leading to a bungalow. About a half-mile section of trackbed remains abandoned leading to the visible blocked up tunnel mouths of Tyler Hill Tunnel. At the south end of the tunnel, the blocked up tunnel can be seen with a short section of embankment. South of Beaconsfield Road, there is a short section of embankment near St. Stephen's Pathway. A pedestrian tunnel is preserved, probably built during the 1830s following a death on the line. The site of Canterbury North Lane station was a goods yard until the 1980s when it was closed. A plan was mooted in the 1980s to open a railway museum on the site, but it remained derelict until being sold for housing development and the extension of Station Road West in about 1998. The Goods Shed was restored and became the country's first 6-day farmers' market and restaurant. The original weighbridge house and a level-crossing gate into the former goods yard are preserved in the development. The Invicta has been preserved, having been extensively restored in 1979, and can be seen in the Whitstable Museum and Gallery. The locomotive is not in its original form, since various modifications were made around 1836 in an effort to improve its performance. One of the stationary steam engines also survives, having been in the possession of the University of Kent and is currently (2021) undergoing restoration. Its wheel and engine are visible in Whitstable Museum, Whitstable.

Part of the Tyler Hill tunnel collapsed at the beginning of July 1974, causing severe subsidence to some buildings at the University of Kent at Canterbury that had been built on the hill above. The resulting voids were filled over the next year, using fly-ash from Richborough Power Station.

== Preservation ==
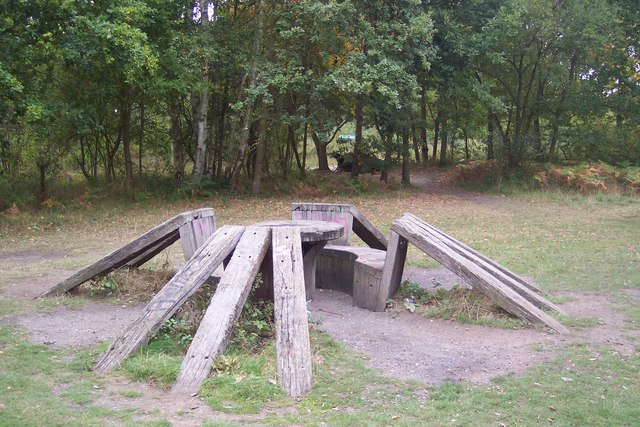
This seat made by Tim Norris. It is part of a rest area beside the Winding Wheel Pond.

In 1997, a charity, The Crab and Winkle Line Trust, was formed to reopen the route as a footpath and cycleway, the Crab and Winkle Way. In 1999, a 7 mile long footpath and cycleway was opened between Canterbury and Whitstable, running along part of the original trackbed. There are plans to allow public access to more of the line.

The Winding Pond, which formerly supplied water for the static winding engine which brought trains up the hill from Whitstable, was incorporated into a picnic and rest area for cyclists and walkers on the route.
