= Powell-Cotton Ethnographic Films =

Ethnographic and wildlife films from the mid-20th century

The Powell-Cotton ethnographic films is a collection of over 70 ethnographic, documentary and wildlife films made by the Powell-Cotton family between 1922 and 1973. The films relate exclusively to the family's expeditions in Africa during this time. The original films are held in the British Film Institute archives, and the Powell-Cotton Museum own copies contemporaneous with the originals.

== Context ==
Between 1887 and 1939 Major Percy H G Powell-Cotton undertook a total of 28 expeditions to Africa and Asia. Alongside the extensive collection of game and animal specimens he bought back, Major Powell-Cotton also shot several reels of 16mm film footage whilst out in the bush.

His films mainly depict African game and wildlife, as well as market scenes, craft making and tribal ceremonies from the African rural communities. One particular film, Gorilla Drive, Cameroons, is believed to be the only one of its subject from this date in existence. It shows the mustering of the animals by the local people, their herding and despatch by the natives with spears.

Powell-Cotton made 17 films in total, either independently or together with his daughter Diana or wife Hannah. All the films are 16mm black and white silent films, made in a non-narrative documentary style. The major also shot all his films using a handheld, windup Bell & Howell Filmo 70 camera, which is currently on display in the Powell-Cotton museum. The first recorded use of colour film was in 1950's in the film South Africa: Victoria Falls & Livingstone Game Park made by Christopher and Diana Powell-Cotton.

Most of the films in the collection were made for private viewing only and for the purposes recording keeping from the expeditions. However, Major Powell-Cotton did present several of his films to the Royal Anthropological Institute in 1932, including Crafts in the Cameroons (1931) and Osonigbe Juju House and Benin Brass Cutting (1931).

== Angola ==
The most notable films of the collection are those by Major Powell-Cotton's daughters, Diana and Antoinette Powell-Cotton from their expeditions to Angola in 1936 and 1937.

The result of their trips was just under three hours of edited black-and-white 16mm film, accompanied by nearly 3,000 objects and 2,000 photographs. The films portray local ceremonies, craft-working and family life in rural Africa. Together they provide a unique record of the region at a crucial time in its history, before the full impact of the massive cultural changes brought about by missionization and colonial rule.

Diana and Antoinette filmed their entire footage on a single, small windup Kodak cine camera which is currently on display in the Powell-Cotton museum. The sisters were not able to review or edit any footage on location, and so were constantly anxious they had not captured the events and activities in Angola successfully. They only edited their footage on their return, and would give private viewings accompanied by music and live narration to family members in their screen room which is now Gallery 4 in the Powell-Cotton museum.

== Exhibitions and projects ==
Some of the Powell-Cotton films are shown as part of the permanent exhibition at the Powell-Cotton Museum.

The Angolan film collection by the Powell-Cotton sisters was also the focus of the special exhibition ‘Tala! Visions of Angola’ which was held at the Powell-Cotton Museum from May to November 2012.

The exhibition was awarded National Lottery Heritage Funding and was co-curated with the Angolan Cultural Foundation and the Angolan Embassy. Commenting on the exhibition, the curators said:

“The objects we had access to, were made by somebody’s great grandmother or great grandfather. They deserve to be seen and remembered by their rightful ancestors as well as the wider public. Just as importantly, the Angolan community here in the UK have a right to be involved in the decisions made about the collection. This is after all their history.”

In connection with the exhibition, a research project entitled ‘Looking Back to Find Them Looking Forward: The Visionary Powell-Cotton Sisters’ and was in collaboration with the Pitt Rivers Museum, University of Oxford.

The project and exhibition aimed to highlight the importance of the daughters collecting practises and material they brought back, especially their ethnographic films. As Oxford Aspire stated in an article on the project;

‘The sisters’ collecting practice was visionary in that it placed photography and film-making in a central role in the collection of material culture, something few other museum collections were doing at the time. As a result, their collection represents a significant part of the film and museum heritage of the county. Until this new project, however, their achievements were not recognised in the galleries of the Powell-Cotton Museum.’

== Filmography ==
See Powell-Cotton filmography

== See also ==
- Powell-Cotton Museum, Quex Park
- Major Percy H. G. Powell-Cotton
- Diana and Antoinette Powell-Cotton
- Visual anthropology
- Ethnographic film

== Bibliography ==
Miller, Ben, ‘"Extraordinary" Tala show brings Visions of Angola to Kent's Powell-Cotton Museum’ on Culture 24, 22 May 2012

Legrand, Louise, Annette, Diana and Antoinette Powell-Cotton: 'interested amateurs'? MA Thesis, University of Kent, 2008

Powell Cotton Museum, Illustrated guide to the Powell-Cotton Museum natural history and ethnography, Quex Park, Birchington, The Museum, 1969
