= Hezekiel Ntuli =

South African sculptor, 1912–73

- Born: 1912; KwaZulu-Natal, South Africa
- Died: 1973 (aged 60–61)
- Education: Self-taught
- Known for: Sculpture
- Notable work: Clay busts (Ubumba Olungashi)
- Movement: Traditional-commercial hybrid

Hezekiel Ntuli (1912–1973) was a South African sculptor known for his work in unfired clay. His practice bridged traditional Zulu ceramic techniques and the commercial art market of the mid-20th century. He is best known for his detailed busts and figures made from Ubumba Olungashi (unfired clay).

== Early life and background ==
Ntuli was born in 1912 in the Eshowe district in KwaZulu-Natal. He attended school at a mission station in Entumeni and later on moved to Pietermaritzburg. He began working with clay at a young age, a common practice in rural Zulu communities where boys modelled cattle while herding. Unlike many of his contemporaries who transitioned to fired ceramics (pottery), Ntuli focused on figurative sculpture, refining a technique that allowed for high levels of detail without the shrinkage or cracking often associated with kiln-firing.

== Artistic style and technique ==
Ntuli's work is characterized by the use of unfired clay (Ubumba Olungashi). This medium allowed him to achieve a realism and texture in his busts—specifically in the depiction of hair, facial features, and traditional ornaments—that was difficult to maintain during the firing process. His subject matter primarily consisted of busts of highly individualized portraits of Zulu people, often depicting specific traditional headgear or hairstyles. He also did figurines of small-scale sculptures of people and animals.

== Commercial success and private collections ==
From the 1930s to the 1960s, Ntuli became a well-known figure in the South African "tourist art" industry. His sculptures were highly sought after by international visitors and local collectors. Because his work was sold directly to the public and through curio outlets rather than formal galleries, the vast majority of his surviving pieces are held in private collections rather than public museums. In 2014, the Vukani Museum received a rare head, reputed to be the largest he ever made in 1965. The sculpture head was donated by Rose Scheffer, wife of the late Lewis Scheffer, who was the town clerk of eShowe.

Some of Ntuli's work was collected by the English explorer and hunter, Percy Powell-Cotton, and is on display at the Powell-Cotton Museum in Quex Park in Birchington.

== Legacy ==
Ntuli is increasingly recognized by art historians for his role as a pioneer of Black professional artistry in South Africa during the Apartheid era. His work is part of the evolution of Zulu material culture and the adaptation of indigenous skills to meet the demands of a global market.

== See also ==
- Zulu people
- South African art
