= Taxonomic contributions of Major P. H. G. Powell-Cotton =

This is a list of the taxonomic contributions of Major Percy Horace Gordon Powell-Cotton.

== Mammal Specimens in the Powell-Cotton Museum ==
The natural history specimens and cultural objects collected by Major Powell-Cotton (1866–1940) on his expeditions to Africa and Asia are preserved in the Powell-Cotton Museum. According to the Mammal Catalogue produced by the Powell-Cotton Museum, there are over 6400 specimens (more than 230 species) preserved in the Museum, belonging to the following 42 families and 149 genera:

Families: Anomaluridae, Bathyergidae, Bovidae, Canidae, Cercopithecidae, Cervidae, Cricetidae, Cryeteropodidae, Ctenodactylidae, Elephantidae, Equidae, Felidae, Galagonidae, Giraffidae, Gliridae, Hippopotamidae, Hipposideridae, Hyaenidae, Hystricidae, Leporidae, Lorisidae, Macroscelididae, Manidae, Muridae, Mustelidae, Nycteridae, Ochotonidae, Pedetidae, Pongidae, Potamogalidae, Procaviidae, Pteropodiae, Rhinocerotidae, Sciuridae, Soricidae, Suidae, Thryonomyidae, Tragulidae, Trichechidae, Ursidae, Vespertilionidae and Viverridae.

Genera: Acinonyx, Addax, Aepyceros, Alcelaphus, Allenopithecus, Ammodorcas, Ammotragus, Anomalurus, Antidorcas, Antilope, Aonyx, Atherurus, Atilax, Bdeogale, Bos, Boselaphas, Bubalus, Canis, Capra, Capricornis, Cephalophus, Ceratotherium, Cercocebus, Cercopithecus, Cervus, Colobus, Connochaetes, Cricetomys, Crocidura, Crocuta, Crossarchus, Cryptomys, Ctenodactylus, Cynictis, Damaliscus, Dendrohyrax, Dicerus, Dorcatragus, Equus, Erythrocebus, Euoticus, Felis, Fennecus, Funisciurus, Galago, Galagoides, Gazella, Genetta, Gerbillus, Giraffa, Gorilla, Graphiurus, Heliosciurus, Helogale, Hemitragus, Herpestes, Heterohyrax, Hippopotamus, Hipposideros, Hippotragus, Hyaena, Hybomys, Hyemoschus, Hylochoerus, Hypsignathus, Hystrix, Ichneumia, Ictonyx, Kobus, Lemniscomys, Lepus, Litocranius, Loxodonta, Lutra, Lycaon, Macaca, Macroscelides, Madoqua, Malacomys, Mandrillus, Manis, Marmota, Mellivora, Melursus, Miopithecus, Moschus, Mungos, Mustela, Myonycteris, Myosciurus, Nandinia, Nemorhaedus, Neotragus, Nycteris, Ochotona, Octocyon, Oenomys, Okapia, Oreotragus, Orycteropus, Oryx, Otolemur, Ourebia, Ovis, Paguma, Pan, Panthera, Pantholops, Papio, Paraxerus, Pedetes, Pelea, Perodiciticus, Petaurista, Phacochoerus, Phacohoerus, Poecilogale, Poiana, Potamogale, Potomocherus, Praomys, Presbytis, Procapra, Procavia, Proteles, Protoxeros, Psammomys, Pseudois, Raphiceros, Redunca, Rupicapra, Scotoecus, Scotophilus, Selenarctos, Sus, Sylvicapra, Syncerus, Tatera, Tetracerus, Thamnomys, Theropithecus, Thryonomys, Tragelaphus, Trichechus, Ursus, Viverrra, Vulpes, Xerus and Zenkerella.

The majority of the specimens fall within the scope of the genera Alcelaphus, Anomalurus, Cephalophus, Cercocebus, Cercopithecus, Colobus, Euoticus, Felis, Gazella, Gorilla, Kobus, Pan, Redunca, Sylvicapra, Syncerus and Tragelaphuse (number of the specimens exceeds 100). Except the two presented specimens of chamois (Rupicapra rupicapra) collected in the Swiss Alps in 1905, all the mammal specimens in the Powell-Cotton Museum were collected in Africa and Asia at the end of the 19th century and the beginning of the 20th century, more specifically from the following countries or regions: Abyssinia, Algeria, Angola, Cameroon, Central African Republic, Chad, Congo, Ethiopia, Guinea, India, Kashmir, Kenya, Morocco, Nigeria, Ogaden, Pakistan, Somalia, South Africa, Sudan, Tanzania, Tibet, Tunisia, Uganda, Zambia and Zimbabwe.

The large mammal specimen collection was built up on the basis of Powell-Cotton's forty years' exploration in Africa and the Indian subcontinent, which is helpful in conducting taxonomic, zoological, ethnobiological/ethnomedical and ethnographic studies. The following mammal type specimens were identified from the total specimens:

Hartebeest
Alcelaphus buselaphus rahatensis
African Buffalo
Bos brachyceros cottoni (Lydekker, 1907)
White Rhino
Ceratotherium simum cottoni (Lydekker, 1908)
Colobus (colobus) palliates cottoni
Monkey
Colobus (guooesa) matshiei dodingae
Colobus (Pliocolobus) powelli
B/W Colobus
Colobus angolensis cottoni (Lydekker, 1905)
Blue Wildebeest
Connochaetes taurinus mattosi (Blaine, 1925)
Wild Ass
Equus africanus africanus dianae (Dollman, 1935)
Giraffe
Giraffa camelopardalis cottoni (Lydekker, 1904)
Giraffa camelopardalis rothschildi (Lydekker, 1903)
Roan Antelope
Hippotragus equines cottoni (Dollman and Burlace, 1928)
Water Chevrotain
Hyemaschus aquaticum cottoni (Lydekker, 1906)
Kobus ellipsiprymnus defassa hawashensis (Matshcie, 1910)
Kobus ellipsiprymnus harnieri cottoni (Matshcie, 1910)
Kobus ellipsiprymnus harnieri dianae (Matshcie, 1910)
Waterbuck
Kobus ellipsiprymnus pallidus (Matschie, 1910)
Kobus ellipsiprymnus thikae (Matschie, 1910)
Honey Badger
Mellivora capensis cottoni (Lydekker, 1906)
Oribi
Ourebia ourebi cottoni
Bush Pig
Potamochaerus koiropotamus cottoni (Pinfold, 1928)
Reedbuck
Redunca redunca cottoni
Common Reedbuck
Redunca redunca cottoni (Rothschild, 1902)
White Rhinoceros
Ceratotherium simus cottoni (Lydekker, 1908)
Cape Buffalo
Syncerus caffer cottoni
Tragelaphus dianae sassae
Bushbuck
Tragelaphus locorinae laticeps (Matschie)
Tragelaphus scriptus cottoni (Matschie, 1912)
Tragelaphus scriptus makalae (Matschie, 1912)
Tragelaphus scriptus powelli (Matschie, 1912)
Greater Kudu
Tragelaphus strepsiceros cottoni (Dollman and Burlace, 1928)

Several mammal species are named after Powell-Cotton, which can be distinguished by the subspecies name "cottoni" or "powelli". The specimens collected by Major P. H. G. Powell-Cotton play an important role in scientific studies because the existence of some of the cottoni species are in danger now, for example, the B/W Colobus (Colobus angolensis cottoni) was rated "Least Concern" in The IUCN Red List of Threatened Species published in 2008.

The accounts of Major P. H. G. Powell-Cotton's specimen collection activities can be found in his books and articles. And, there is no difference between some of his writings and adventure stories. For example, in Black rhinoceros hunting which is included in Big Game Shooting in Africa, he vividly recorded the hunting of a black Rhino:

To my consternation I then saw the second gun-bearer, a most erratic shot, raising his rifle, from which I knew Bedoni was quite as likely to get the bullet as the Rhino. My shout of protest was too late; the report rang out, but mercifully the shot went aground, while at the same moment Bedoni lost his footing and fell just in front of the beast which blundered onwards straight over his outstretched form. His teeth were chattering and his wrist was badly bruised by the animal's foot, but otherwise there was no sign of damage, and in a few moments we were steadied enough to look for our quarry lying motionless close by.

Aside from the two books titled "A Sporting Trip through Abyssinia" (1902) and "In Unknown Africa" (1904) and the book chapter titled "Black rhinoceros hunting", his writings were published in journals and magazines, including The Antiquaries Journal (e.g. vol. 4, no. 3, 1924), The Geographical Journal (vol. 30, 1907), Journal of the Society for the Preservation of the Fauna of the Empire (e.g. Jan. 1937), Journal of the Royal African Society (e.g. vol. 7, 1907), The Wide World Magazine (e.g. Feb. 1904) and Man (e.g. vol. 29, 1929). The content of these writings includes the records of mammal hunting, accounts of the biological characteristics of mammals and descriptions of local (primarily African) culture and nature.

== Mammal specimens, scientific studies and the Museum ==
The mammal specimens (skulls, skeletons, skin, horns, etc.) in the Powell-Cotton Museum are exhibits as well as objects of study. Some academics from universities and research institutes such as University of Cambridge, University College London, University of Sheffield, University of Kent, University of Exeter, The University of Bradford, University of the Witwatersrand, University of California, Université Sorbonne Nouvelle - Paris III, University of Melbourne, Universitat Autonoma de Barcelona, Canterbury Christchurch University, Norfolk and Norwich University Hospital and University of Veterinary Medicine Vienna used to visit this museum in order to obtain skeletal data, collect samples for DNA or dietary analysis and so on. One of the academic visitors is Professor Colin Groves of the Australian National University, whose research interests include but are not limited to mammalian taxonomy (especially primate taxonomy), human evolution and taxonomic history of mammals. In addition to the specimens preserved in the museums such as Natural History Museum (London), Muséum National d'Histoire Naturelle (Paris), Museum voor Middenafrika (Tervuren), Naturalis (Leiden), Musée Royale d'Histoire Naturelle (Brussels), Kenya National Museums (Nairobi), Zoologisches Museum A. Humboldt (Berlin) and Museum A. Koenig (Bonn), he also utilized the mammal specimens provided by the Powell-Cotton Museum and hence conducted many comparative studies, for example, he used to measure the skulls of Northern White Rhinoceros, and examine the colobus material and the specimens of musk-deer at the Museum. Some of these studies can be found in his noted book "Primate Taxonomy" which is considered to relabel museum cabinets. And, he thought highly of the Powell-Cotton Museum.

Under the joint effort of Bernard Wood, University Professor of Human Origins at The George Washington University, Adam D. Gordon, an anthropologist and assistant professor at the University at Albany, State University of New York and Malcolm Harman, curator of the Powell-Cotton Museum, the "Human Origin Database" project, which is funded by The G. Harold & Leila Y. Mathers Foundation and aims to provide information about fossil hominin specimens and extant hominoid specimens, has been developed. In addition to the measurements and skeletal element information in Professor Wood's 1991 book Koobi Fora Research Project. Volume 4: Hominid Cranial Remains, the complete skeletal element inventory of the chimpanzee and gorilla collections preserved in the Powell-Cotton Museum is also included in this database.
