= Listed buildings in Birchington-on-Sea =

Civil Parish in Kent, England

Birchington-on-Sea is a village and civil parish in the Thanet District of Kent, England. It contains 38 listed buildings that are recorded in the National Heritage List for England. Of these one is grade II* and 37 are grade II.

This list is based on the information retrieved online from Historic England.

== Key ==
Grade	Criteria
I	Buildings that are of exceptional interest
II*	Particularly important buildings of more than special interest
II	Buildings that are of special interest

== Listing ==
Name	Grade	Location	Type	Completed (Note: The date given is the date used by Historic England as significant for the initial building or that of an important part in the structure's description.)	Date designated	Grid ref. (Note: The grid reference is based on the British national grid reference system, sometimes known as OSGB36, used by the Ordnance Survey.) Geo-coordinates	Notes	Entry number (Note: The "List Entry Number" is a unique number assigned to each listed building and scheduled monument by Historic England.)	Image	Wikidata
Great Brooksend Farmhouse and Attached Stable and Walls	II				24 July 2008	TR2908268246; 51°22′01″N 1°17′23″E		1392668	Upload Photo	Q26671877
Stables to Quex Park	II				22 February 1973	TR3093368283; 51°22′00″N 1°18′58″E		1351082	Upload Photo	Q26634223
197, Canterbury Road	II	197, Canterbury Road			22 February 1976	TR3042269078; 51°22′26″N 1°18′34″E		1203303	Upload Photo	Q26498851
199, Canterbury Road	II	199, Canterbury Road			22 February 1973	TR3041169069; 51°22′26″N 1°18′33″E		1341506	Upload Photo	Q26625593
207, Canterbury Road	II	207, Canterbury Road			22 February 1973	TR3036269059; 51°22′26″N 1°18′31″E		1088985	Upload Photo	Q26381403
230-238, Canterbury Road	II	230-238, Canterbury Road			10 December 1981	TR3007168896; 51°22′21″N 1°18′15″E		1241725	Upload Photo	Q26534585
Birchington Methodist Chapel	II	Canterbury Road	chapel		22 February 1987	TR3035969035; 51°22′25″N 1°18′30″E		1088986	Birchington Methodist Chapel More images	Q26381404
Court Mount Country Club	II	291, Canterbury Road			22 February 1973	TR3000768752; 51°22′16″N 1°18′12″E		1341507	Upload Photo	Q26625594
Grove House	II	215, Canterbury Road			22 February 1973	TR3032569035; 51°22′25″N 1°18′29″E		1203367	Upload Photo	Q26498908
Smugglers' Cafe	II	212, Canterbury Road			10 April 1951	TR3032769090; 51°22′27″N 1°18′29″E		1203373	Upload Photo	Q26498914
The White House	II	205, Canterbury Road			22 February 1973	TR3037269066; 51°22′26″N 1°18′31″E		1281713	Upload Photo	Q26570731
Elder Cottage Old Bay Cottage	II	141, Minnis Road, Birchington On Sea			22 February 1973	TR2897769439; 51°22′40″N 1°17′20″E		1094660	Upload Photo	Q26386989
Gore End Barn	II	Minnis Road			10 October 2000	TR2939369332; 51°22′36″N 1°17′41″E		1389101	Upload Photo	Q26668543
2 Statues in Centre of Lily Pond at Quex Park	II	Quex Park, Birchington On Sea			22 February 1973	TR3087868404; 51°22′04″N 1°18′56″E		1351083	Upload Photo	Q26634224
4 Bronze Gun Carriages Situated in Front of the Powell Cotton Museum Building	II	Quex Park, Birchington On Sea			22 February 1973	TR3084968285; 51°22′00″N 1°18′54″E		1094670	Upload Photo	Q26386999
Column in Grounds of Quex Park	II	Quex Park, Birchington On Sea			22 February 1973	TR3088368448; 51°22′05″N 1°18′56″E		1094672	Upload Photo	Q26387001
Gun Tower in the Grounds of Quex Park	II	Quex Park, Birchington On Sea			22 February 1973	TR3093668679; 51°22′13″N 1°18′59″E		1094673	Upload Photo	Q26387002
Quex Farm Cottage	II	2, Quex Park, Birchington On Sea			22 February 1973	TR3061168328; 51°22′02″N 1°18′42″E		1281412	Upload Photo	Q26570464
Quex House	II	Quex Park, Birchington On Sea			22 February 1973	TR3087668294; 51°22′00″N 1°18′55″E		1094671	Upload Photo	Q26387000
Waterloo Tower in Grounds of Quex Park	II	Quex Park, Birchington On Sea			22 February 1973	TR3108268041; 51°21′52″N 1°19′05″E		1094674	Upload Photo	Q26387003
10 Shakespeare Road	II	10, Shakespeare Road			31 August 2001	TR3000569655; 51°22′46″N 1°18′14″E		1389407	Upload Photo	Q26668843
Delmonte and the Galleon Tower Bungalows	II	Spencer Road, Birchington On Sea			30 June 1986	TR3024469808; 51°22′50″N 1°18′26″E		1241766	Upload Photo	Q26534621
Fair Outlook	II	Spencer Road, Birchington On Sea			30 June 1986	TR3011069837; 51°22′51″N 1°18′19″E		1260357	Upload Photo	Q26551379
Poet's Corner	II	Spencer Road, Birchington On Sea			30 June 1986	TR3020069782; 51°22′49″N 1°18′24″E		1260368	Upload Photo	Q26551387
Sea Tower Sea Tower Cottage Tower Bungalows	II	Spencer Road, Birchington On Sea			30 June 1986	TR3019069811; 51°22′50″N 1°18′24″E		1241784	Upload Photo	Q26534638
The Old Coach House and Sunny Lodge	II	Spencer Road			8 May 2002	TR3025269780; 51°22′49″N 1°18′27″E		1390066	Upload Photo	Q26669486
Tower Bungalows White Cliffe	II	Spencer Road, Birchinton On Sea			30 June 1986	TR3022669818; 51°22′51″N 1°18′25″E		1241779	Upload Photo	Q26534633
Tresco Lodge and the Porch	II	Spencer Road			8 May 2002	TR3022169783; 51°22′49″N 1°18′25″E		1390065	Upload Photo	Q26669485
Laburnum	II	2, Station Road, Birchington On Sea			10 April 1951	TR3020269086; 51°22′27″N 1°18′22″E		1094683	Upload Photo	Q26387011
Birchington and Acol War Memorial and Memorial Enclosure	II	The Square, Canterbury Road, Birchington-on-sea, CT7 9AF	war memorial		21 February 2017	TR3023969039; 51°22′25″N 1°18′24″E		1441732	Birchington and Acol War Memorial and Memorial Enclosure More images	Q66478367
Church of All Saints	II*	The Square, Birchington On Sea	church building		10 April 1951	TR3019169034; 51°22′25″N 1°18′22″E		1094681	Church of All Saints More images	Q17546635
K6 Telephone Kiosk Outside the Church	II	The Square, Birchington On Sea			6 January 1988	TR3022169070; 51°22′26″N 1°18′23″E		1260329	Upload Photo	Q26551354
K6 Telephone Kiosk Outside the Powell Arms	II	The Square, Birchington On Sea			6 January 1988	TR3022069070; 51°22′26″N 1°18′23″E		1241819	Upload Photo	Q26534672
The Fountain	II	The Square			6 November 2002	TR3026669052; 51°22′26″N 1°18′26″E		1491457	Upload Photo	
The Horse Trough	II	The Square			2 November 2002	TR3026769050; 51°22′26″N 1°18′26″E		1489855	Upload Photo	
The Powell Arms Public House	II	11, The Square, Birchington On Sea			22 February 1973	TR3021569062; 51°22′26″N 1°18′23″E		1204108	Upload Photo	Q26499587
Tomb of Dante Gabriel Rossetti in Churchyard	II	The Square, Birchington On Sea			22 February 1973	TR3016769017; 51°22′25″N 1°18′20″E		1094682	Upload Photo	Q26387010

== See also ==
- Grade I listed buildings in Kent
- Grade II* listed buildings in Kent

== Sources ==
- Newman, John (2013) [1969], Kent: North-East and East, The Buildings of England, New Haven and London: Yale University Press, ISBN 978-0-300-18506-5
