= Fort Nongqayi =

Coordinates: 28°54′13″S 31°26′49″E

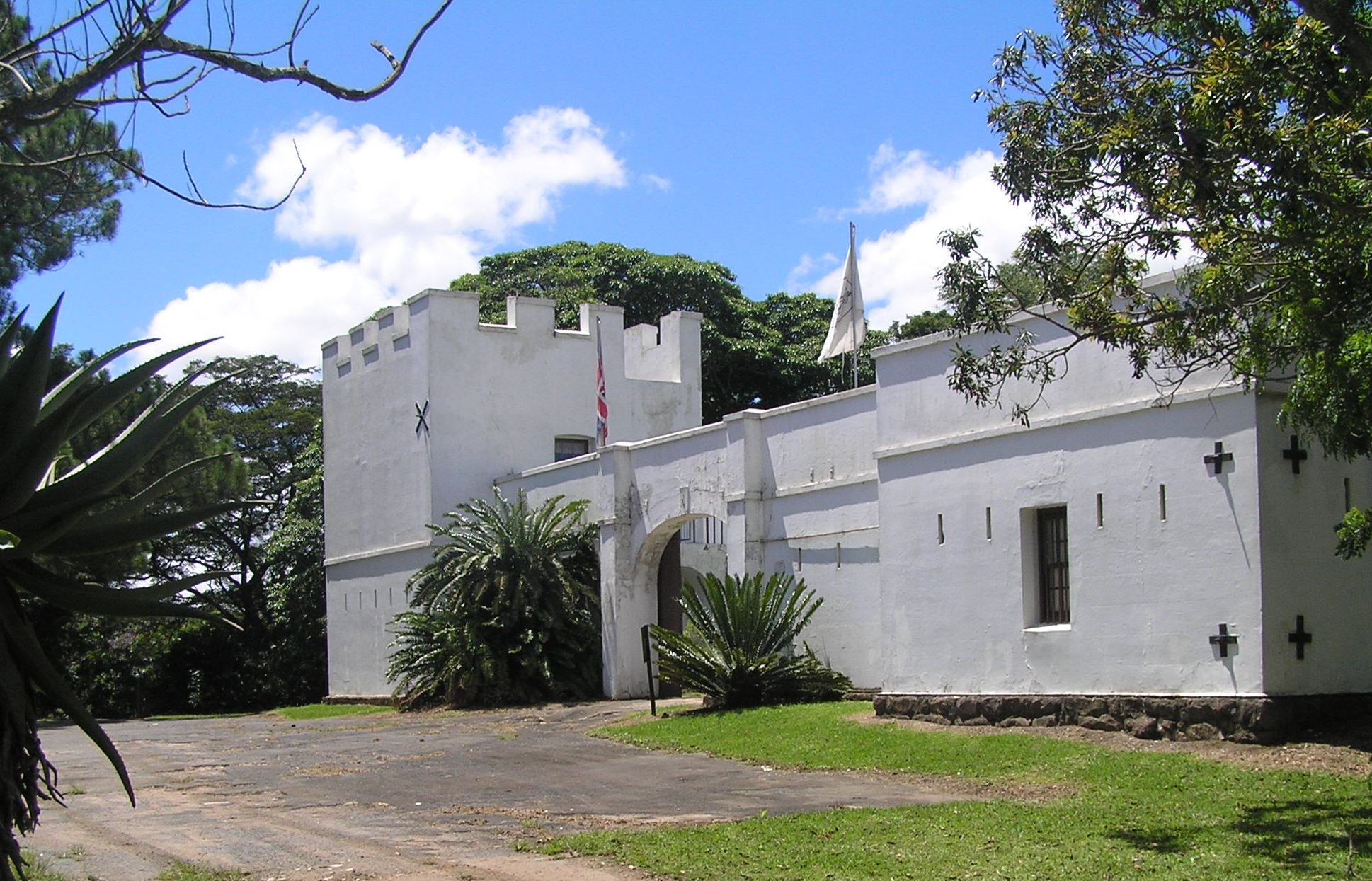
- Interactive map of the Fort Nongqayi area

General information
- Location: 10 Nongqai Street, Eshowe (King Cetshwayo District Municipality), South Africa
- Year built: 1883–1894

Fort Nongqayi, near Eshowe, KwaZulu-Natal, was built to house the "barefoot" Zulu police force known as the Nongqayi.

The intent of the force was to reinforce the British authority after the Anglo-Zulu War and to impose the authority of the resident commissioner, Sir Melmoth Osborn. The fort was built in 1883 about 2 kilometres from the town center on a high point that offers observation in all directions. This colonial police unit was based here until it was disbanded in 1904. The unit was recalled in 1906 to help the authorities suppress the Bambatha Rebellion. Once the insurrection was suppressed, the unit was finally dissolved.

The building has three granulated towers and a spacious courtyard. Weapon slits for rifles were built into the walls to repel possible attackers.

A village museum was established in 1961 to tell the story of the history of the fort and the surroundings. It pays particular attention to the military, cultural and missionary history of the region. In 2019 the Vukani Cultural Museum, operating on the same presinct was incorporated into the greater facility. The new entity is called the Fort Nongqayi Museum Village. Currently Johannes Diemont is the Curator of the Fort Nongqayi Museum Village.

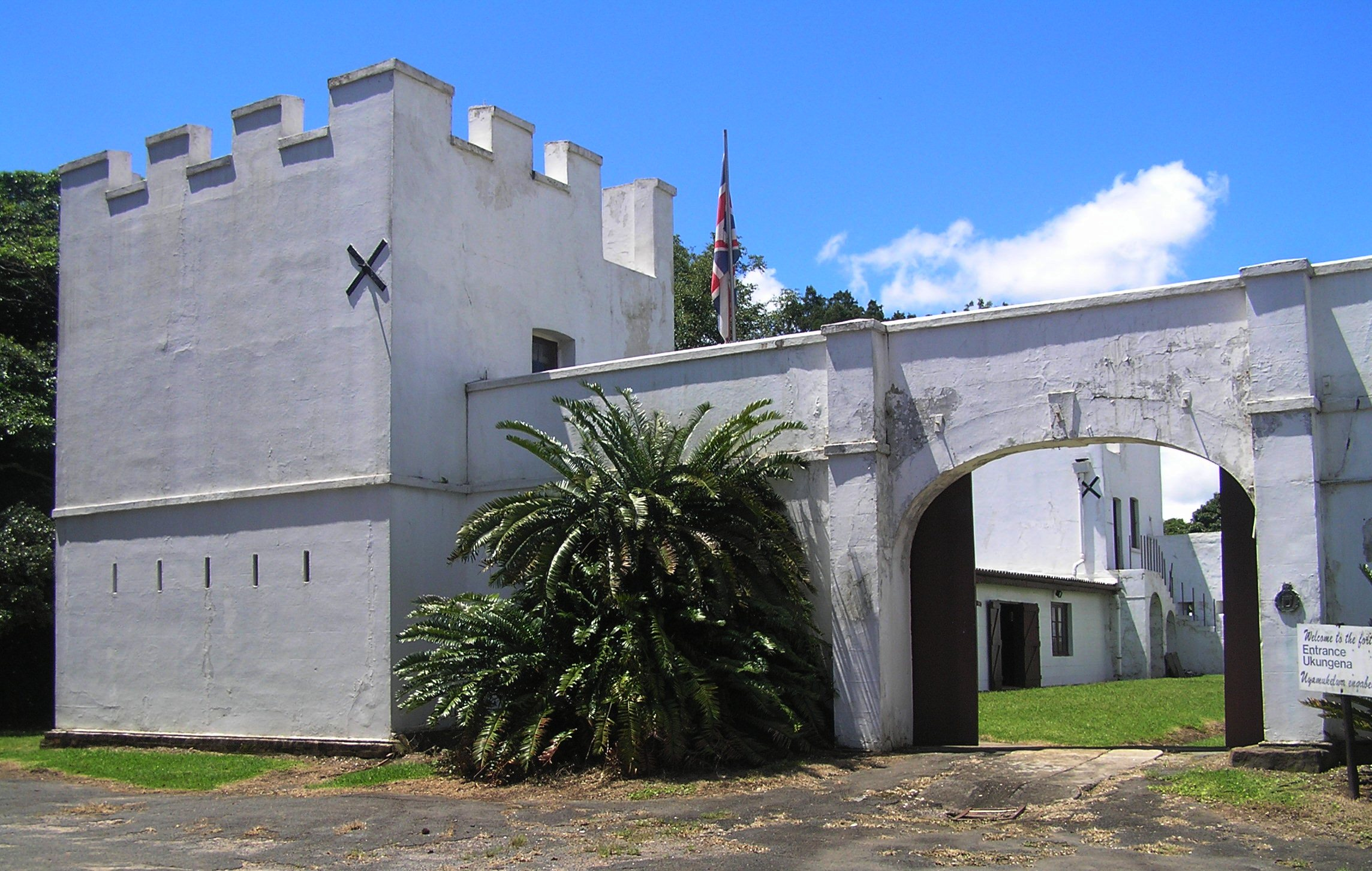
The Entrance

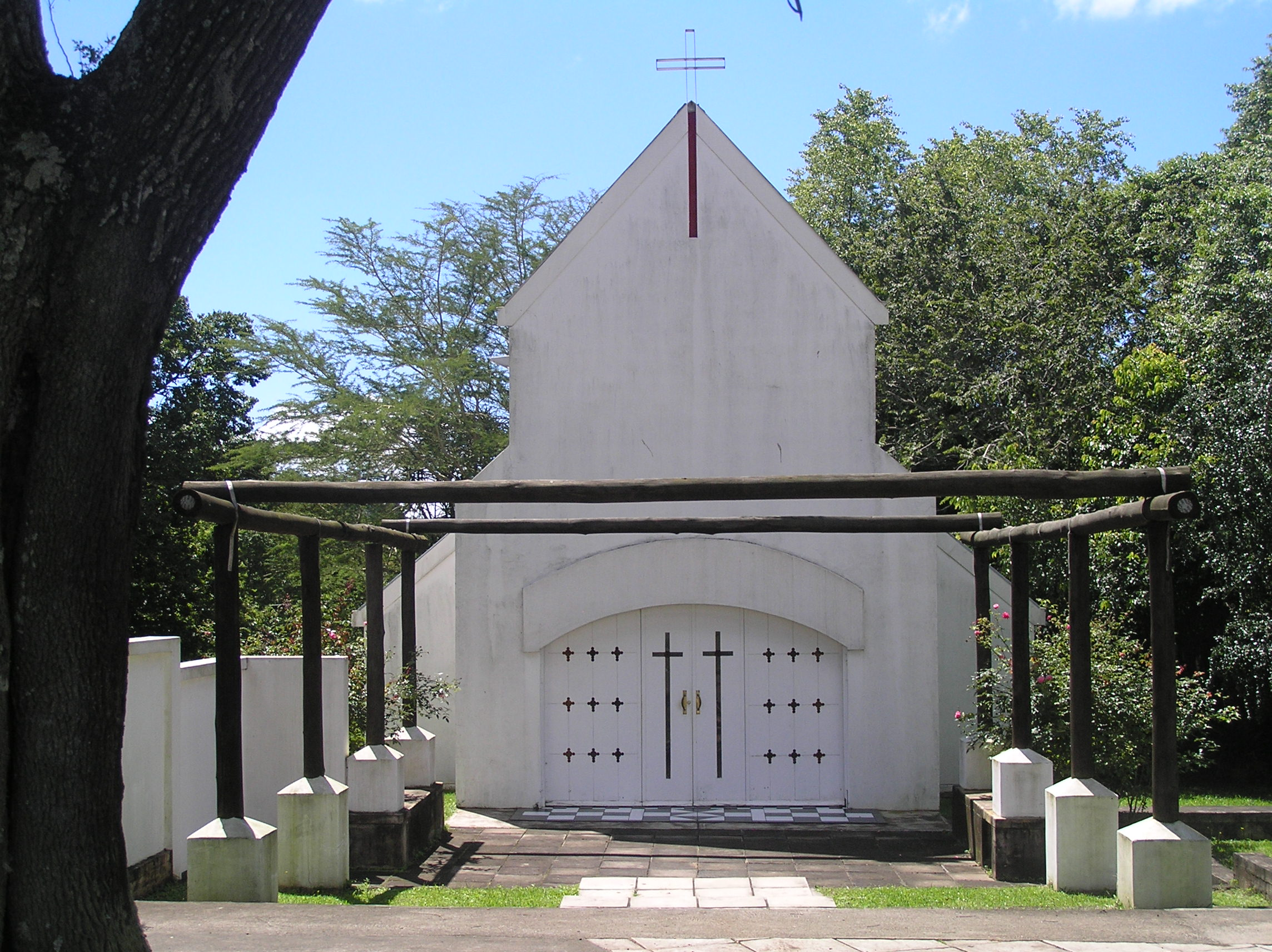
The Chapel
