= Furniture made out of animals =

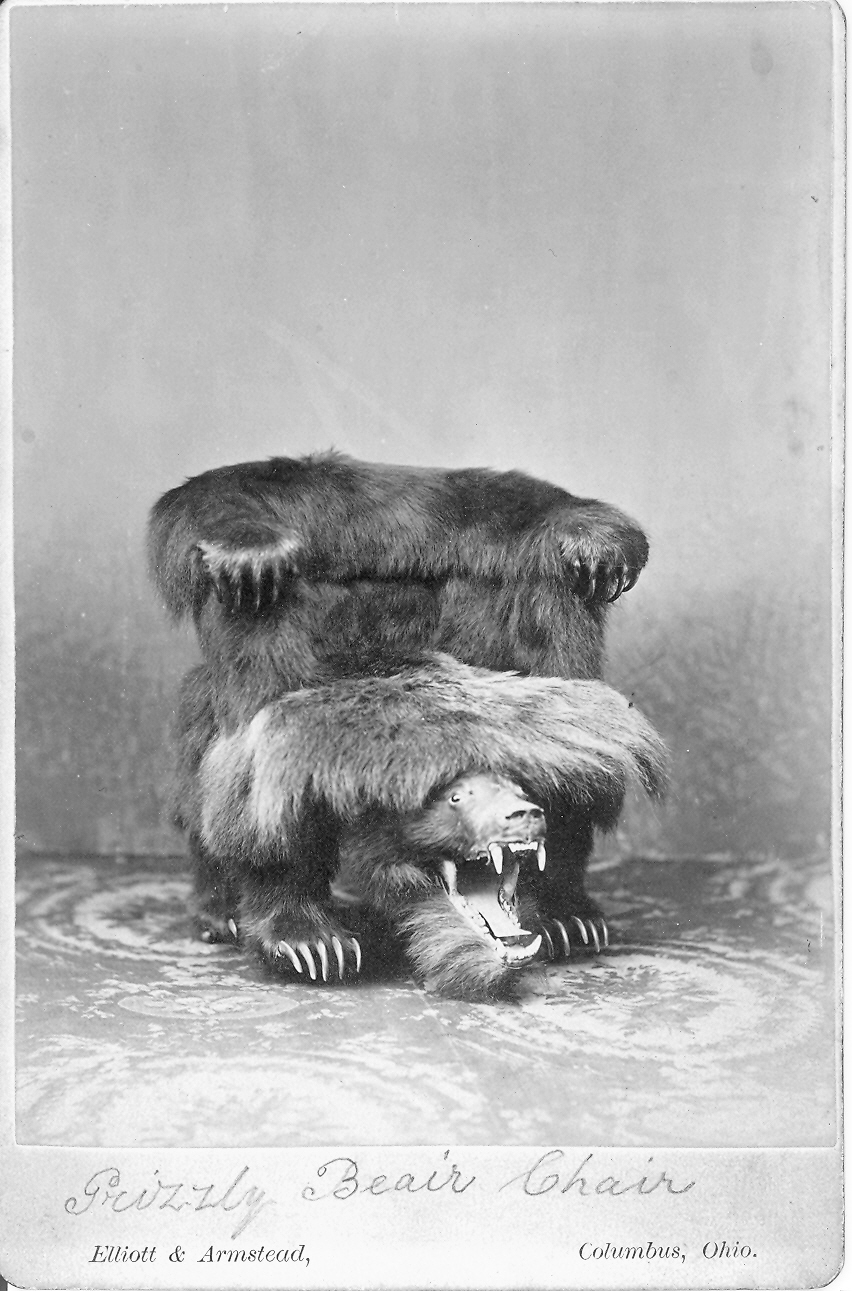
1877 Wheeler Bear Skin Chair

Furniture made out of animals became popular during the Victorian era. In 1896, William G. Fitzgerald wrote an article titled "Animal Furniture" in The Strand Magazine. The article included a photographic gallery of unusual pieces from the era, including a liquor stand made from an elephant's foot, a door stop made from an ostrich foot, a candelabra made from a monkey, lamps made from a black swan, an emu, monkeys, and a black bear, a chair made from a baby giraffe (with neck and head rising from the back, a porter's chair made out of a baby elephant, and a "tiger chair" with the seat covered in the animal's skin, the tail coiled around the edge, and "the head and paws ... arranged so as to give the impression that the terrible animal is about to spring." In a 1907 book on big game hunting in Ceylon, Harry Storey described his practices of making furniture out of elephant parts:

"Of trophies to be secured from our elephants the feet rank first . . . They make fine footstools, liquor stands, or, if cut long in the leg, umbrella stands.

In his book, "Empire and the Animal Body," John Miller wrote that the animal furniture made from exotic animals from throughout the British Empire became "hyperbolically domesticated metropolitan accessories that testify to imperial power through their extraordinary, and sometimes comic, ingenuity.

Victorian furniture made from animals is sometimes referred to as "Wardian furniture," derived from the name of the noted taxidermist, Rowland Ward. One author noted:

"As a result of the work of Rowland Ward, there was a craze in the Victorian era for furniture and other decorative items made from the parts of animals. His were so popular that he got the unofficial naming rights: 'Wardian furniture' was the name generally given to any such object ..."
