= Birchington =

Village in Kent, England

Coordinates: 51.377°N 1.3050°E

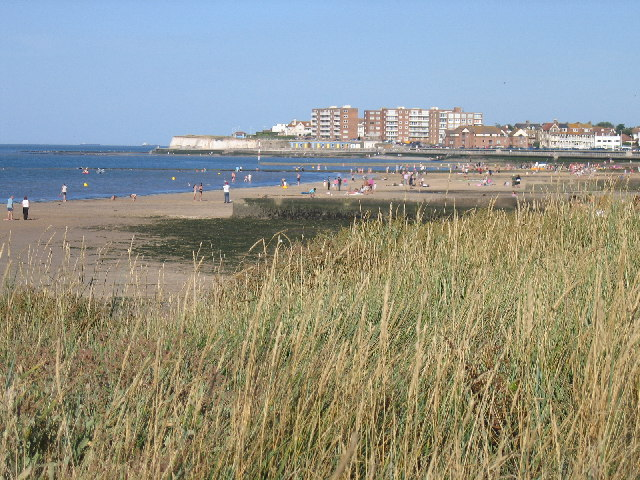
- Minnis Bay

- Location within Kent
- Interactive map of Birchington
- Population: 10,395 (2021 census)
- OS grid reference: TR298694
- Civil parish: Birchington
- District: Thanet
- Shire county: Kent
- Region: South East
- Country: England
- Sovereign state: United Kingdom
- Post town: Birchington
- Postcode district: CT7
- Dialling code: 01843
- Police: Kent
- Fire: Kent
- Ambulance: South East Coast
- UK Parliament: Herne Bay and Sandwich

Birchington (also known as Birchington-on-Sea) is a village and civil parish in the Thanet district of Kent, England. It had a population of 10,395 at the 2021 census. Although the village's railway station is called Birchington-on-Sea, the parish is officially Birchington.

It lies on the coast facing the North Sea, east of the Thames Estuary, between the seaside resorts of Herne Bay and Westgate-on-Sea. As a seaside resort, the village is a tourist and retirement destination. Minnis Bay is a family beach with attractions such as sailing, windsurfing, a paddling pool and coastal walking routes; its three smaller beaches are surrounded by chalk cliffs, cliff stacks and caves.

== History ==
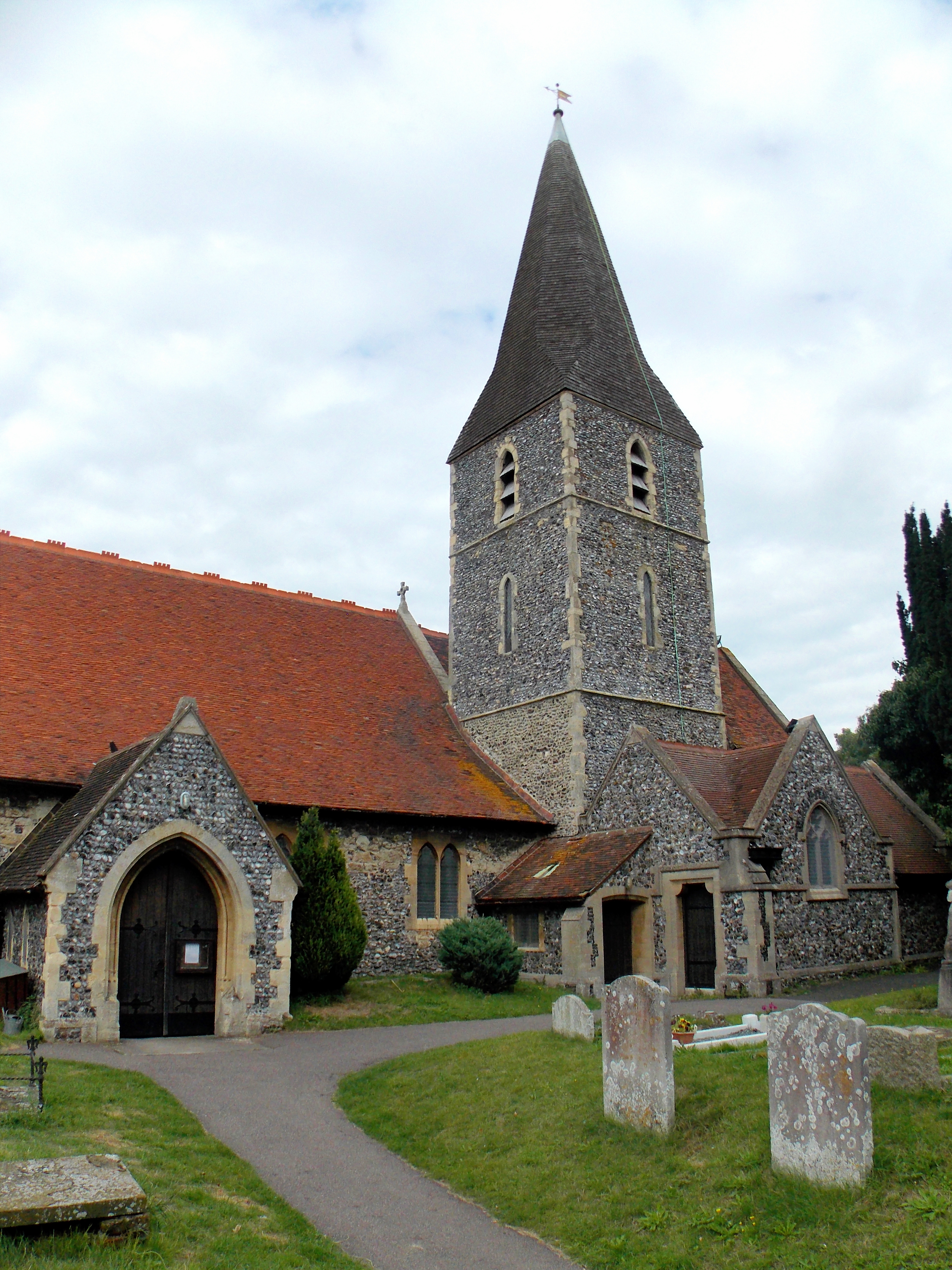
All Saints' Church

Birchington was first recorded in 1240 as Birchenton, a name derived from the Old English words 'bircen tun', meaning a farm where birch trees grow. Archaeological evidence has shown the area was inhabited before the existence of the village; Roman and prehistoric artefacts have been discovered in the area, and Minnis Bay was once the site of an Iron Age settlement.

Archives show that the village's All Saints' Church dates to around 1350. In the early 15th century, Quex Park manor house — named after the park's second owner, John Quek — was built just south of the village. The ownership of the manor passed to various families until 1770 when it was acquired by the present owners, the Powell family. In the late 17th century, the house was visited by King William III.

In 1565, a report on the coast of Thanet by the commissioners of Queen Elizabeth I stated that Birchington had 42 houses and did not have an active port. Before the 19th century, the village coastline was frequented by smugglers, leading to skirmishes between them and excise officers. Several of the older houses in the village contain cellars and bricked-up tunnels, once used for storing contraband.

The 1801 census recorded the village's population as 537. In the early 19th century, the Tudor Quex House was demolished and a manor house was built in its place. In 1818, the Waterloo Tower was built on the grounds; it is a bell tower built by the owner of Quex Park, John Powell, who had an interest in change ringing. Waterloo Tower was the first twelve-bell tower in Kent. The village was a farming community until the late 19th century, when it began to develop into a coastal resort.

Birchington-on-Sea railway station was opened in 1863 and the Railway Hotel, now the Sea View Hotel public house, was opened in 1865. Station Road was built subsequently to serve as Birchington's main shopping street. Coast Guard cottages were built at Minnis Bay in the 1870s and the first shops appeared by the bay in 1903.

== Geography ==
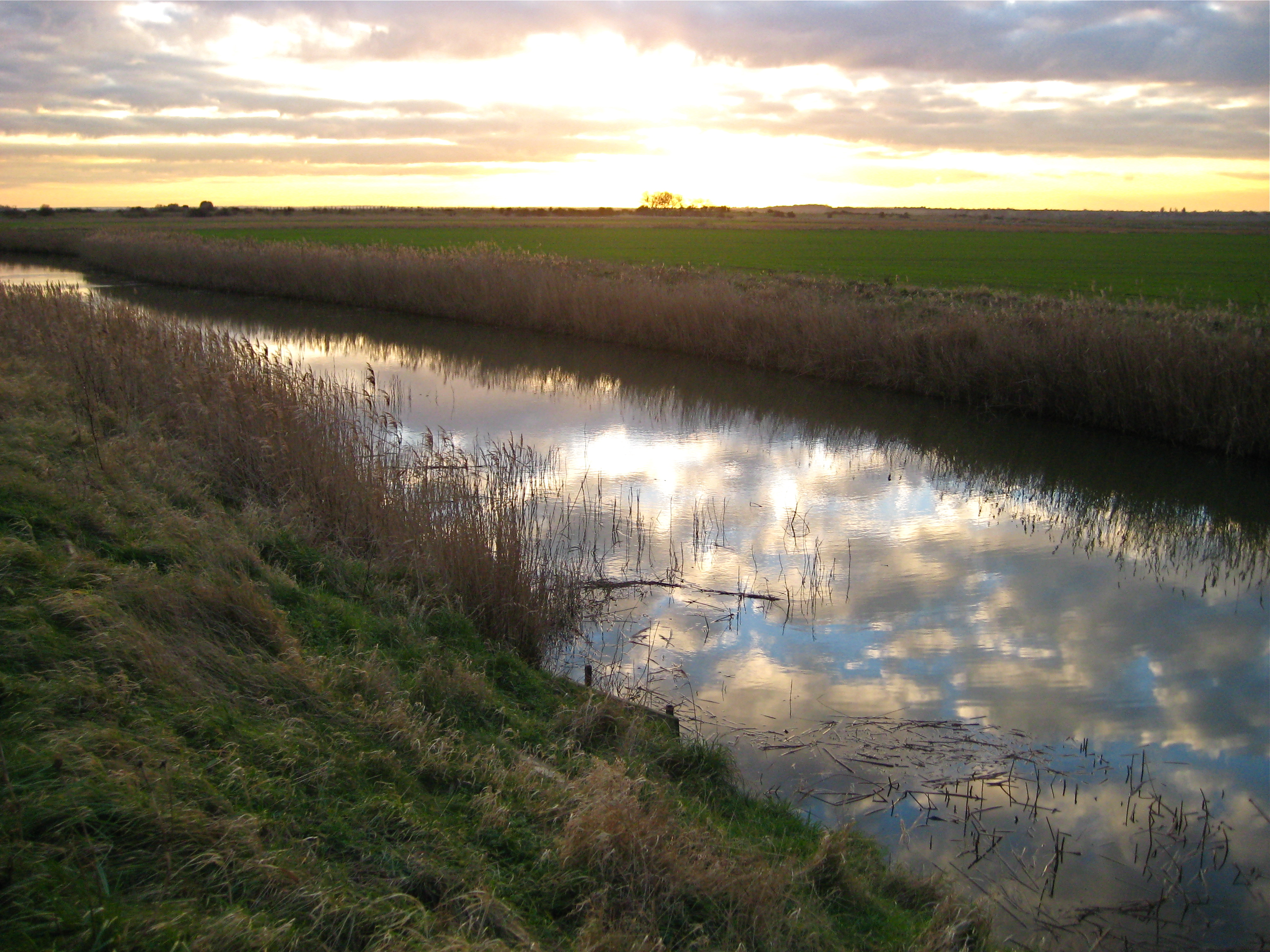
A dyke in the Wantsum channel marshland, between Birchington and Herne Bay

Birchington is located in north-east Kent, on the coast of the Thames Estuary. It lies 9 miles (14.5 km) to the east of Herne Bay and 4 miles (6.4 km) to the west of Margate. The small town of Westgate-on-Sea lies between Birchington and Margate.

The village is built beside four partly sandy bays; Minnis Bay to the west, Grenham Bay and Beresford Gap towards the centre, and Epple Bay to the east. It is situated on the Isle of Thanet, which was a separate island from mainland Kent until around 200 years ago, when the channel in between silted up. The area to the west of the village, between Birchington and Herne Bay, was once part of the channel and is now low-lying marshland. To the east, the land rises forming chalk cliffs and cliff stacks around the beaches at Grenham Bay, Beresford Gap and Epple Bay. A sea wall stretches along the foot of the cliffs to prevent further erosion. The geology of Thanet consists mainly of chalk, deposited when the area was below the sea. Isle of Thanet became exposed above sea-level once the English Channel broke through between Kent and France, causing the sea-level to fall. The whole of the north-east Kent coast has been designated a Site of Special Scientific Interest.

The drinking water in the village is classed as being very hard, having just over 120 mg of calcium per litre; this is due to water being obtained from underground chalk sources by the water company Southern Water.

=== Climate ===
In east Kent, the warmest time of the year is July and August, when maximum temperatures average around 21°C (70°F). The coolest time of the year is January and February, when minimum temperatures average around 1°C (34°F).

East Kent's average maximum and minimum temperatures are around 0.5°C higher than the national average. East Kent's average annual rainfall is about 728 mm (28.7 in), with October to January being the wettest months. The national average annual rainfall is about 838 mm (33.0 in).

=== Demography ===
At the 2021 census, the civil parish had a population of 10,395 people in 5,020 households.

Census population of Birchington parish
Census	Population	Female	Male	Households	Source
2001	9,827	5,394	4,433	4,744	
2011	9,961	5,349	4,612	4,944	
2021	10,395	5,511	4,884	5,020	

Birchington-on-Sea compared
2011 UK census	Birchington	Thanet	England
Total population	9,961	134,186	53,012,456
White	96%	91%	86%
Asian	1.7%	5%	8%
Black	0.7%	1.6%	3.4%
Christian	61%	60%	59%
Muslim	0.9%	2.3%	5%
Hindu	0.5%	1%	1.5%
No religion	29%	28%	25%
Over 65 years old	21%	17%	16.4%

At the 2011 census, the village had 9,961 residents. There were 4,944 households, of which 43.6% were married couples living together, 13.0% were cohabiting couples; 43.4% of all households were made up of lone individuals. For every 100 females, there were 86.2 males. The age distribution was 6% aged 0–4 years, 13.1% aged 5–15 years, 5.1% aged 16–19 years, 28.2% aged 20–44 years, 26.4% aged 45–64 years and 21.2% aged 65 years and over.

The village had a high percentage of residents over 65, compared with the national average of 16.4%. The ethnicity of the village was predominately white, with over 95% of its residents being born in the United Kingdom and other Western European countries. About 61% of residents claimed to be Christian, with less than 1% claiming to be Buddhist, Jewish, Hindu or an alternative religion, while 7.4% did not state their religion, and 28.6% claimed no religious affiliation.

== Economy ==
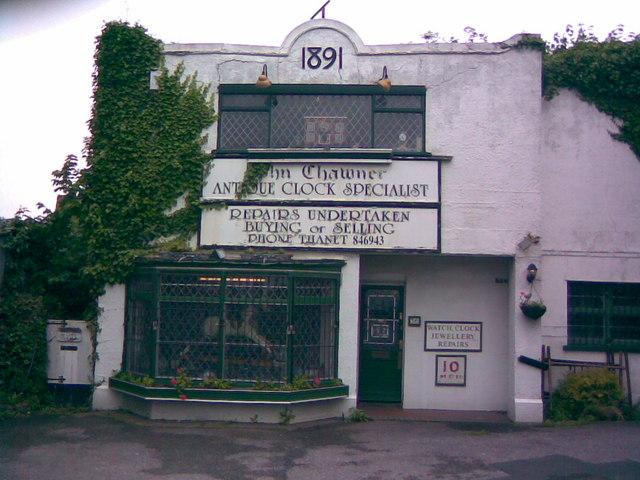
An antiques shop in Birchington; 16.1% of the village's population is employed in retail

At the 2011 UK census, the economic activity of residents in the village aged 16–74 was 31.7% in full-time employment, 14.4% in part-time employment, 10.1% self-employed, 5.7% unemployed, 3.0% students with jobs, 4.3% students without jobs, 18.2% retired, 4.9% looking after home or family, 5.5% permanently sick or disabled and 2.1% economically inactive for other reasons. The percentage of retired people was significantly higher than the national figure of 13.7%. 20.6% of the village's residents aged 16–74 had Level 4 qualification or higher, compared to 27.3% nationwide. According to Office for National Statistics (ONS) estimates, during the period of April 2001 to March 2002 the average gross weekly income of households in the Birchington electoral wards was £460 (£23,986 per year).

The industry of employment of residents in 2011 was 16.1% retail, 17.2% health and social work, 5.8% manufacturing, 12.3% education, 1.3% real estate, 9.6% construction, 4.9% transport and storage, 2.2% communications, 6.7% public administration, 4.3% hotels and restaurants, 3.1% finance, 0.8% agriculture, 1.1% energy and water supply, and 5.2% other community, social or personal services. Compared to national figures, the village had a relatively high number of workers in the construction and health/social care industries and a relatively low number in manufacturing. Many residents commute to work outside the village; at the 2001 census, the village had 3,370 employed residents, but only 1,711 jobs.

As a seaside resort, the village has an economy based around tourism, with several hotels, caravan parks and leisure attractions. The shopping centre attracts walk-in trade from tourists. One of the largest retailers is the Co-op supermarket. The elderly population of the village has generated health and social care jobs at local care homes and at the Birchington Medical Centre. At the 2001 census, 1.4% of the village's population resided in a medical or care establishment, compared to the national average of only 0.8%.

== Governance ==
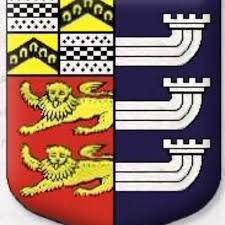
Birchington Parish Council's logo

Birchington is a part of the parliamentary constituency of Herne Bay and Sandwich, which covers much of north-east Kent. The seat was created at the 2024 general election, when the Conservative Sir Roger Gale was elected. Before 2024, Birchington was part of the North Thanet constituency.

Birchington is in the Thanet local government district. The village's electoral wards of Birchington North and Birchington South have five of the 56 seats on Thanet District Council. At the 2023 local elections, all five of those seats were held by the Conservative Party. Birchington North ward is represented by George Kup and Reece Pugh; Birchington South ward by Emma Dawson, Phil Fellows and Linda Wright.

The village has its own civil parish, the lowest unit of local government. Birchington Parish Council has ten members and deals with issues specifically affecting the parish. They meet regularly, both as a full council and as separate focused committees.

Members of the parish council and office staff (as of March 2026)
Name	Role
Nick Blankley	Chairman
Max Houghton	Vice-chairman
Neville Hudson	Parish councillor
Linda Wright	Parish councillor
Philip Fellows	Parish councillor
Bob Prebble	Parish councillor
Colin Brown	Parish councillor
John Tiley	Parish councillor
Jim Moore	Parish councillor
Martin (Marty) Dickerson	Parish councillor
Jane Bevan	Clerk to the Parish Council
Bill Anderson	Deputy clerk to the Parish Council

== Education ==
Birchington's secondary school is the mixed King Ethelbert School, which has about 850 pupils. In 2006, it sought government support to become a specialist visual arts school and has since offered a BTEC in Art & Design in the sixth form. In 2024, an Ofsted inspection rated the school 'Good' in all areas.

Many secondary students living in Birchington commute to schools in nearby towns, especially to the grammar schools in Ramsgate and Broadstairs. The village's primary school is Birchington CofE, which is a state school owned by the Church of England but run by Kent County Council. In 2018, the school's Key Stage 2 performances ranked 333rd out of 420 Kent state primary schools.

== Transport ==
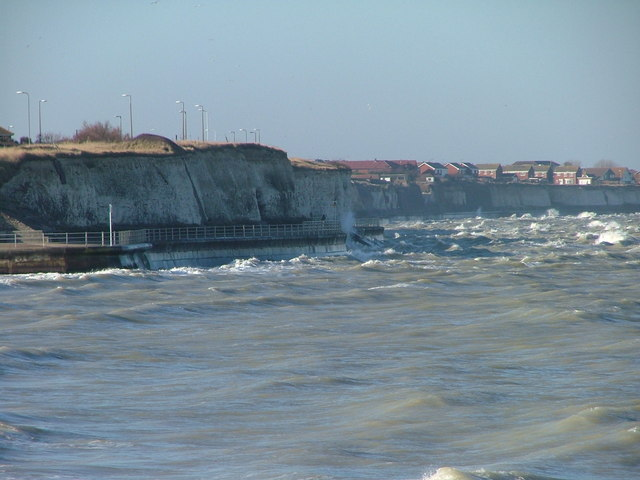
A view of Birchington from neighbouring Westgate-on-Sea

Birchington-on-Sea railway station lies on the Chatham Main Line, which runs between Ramsgate in east Kent and London Victoria, via Broadstairs, Margate, Herne Bay, Faversham, Gillingham, Chatham, Rochester and Bromley South. Birchington is around 1 hour and 40 minutes from London by train. Services are operated by Southeastern.

Stagecoach South East operates bus services to Westgate-on-Sea, Margate, Broadstairs, and Canterbury, whilst YMS Travel operates bus services to Herne Bay and Margate. A National Express coach service also runs between London's Victoria Coach Station and Ramsgate - however this is due to cease operations on 7th December 2026.

The A28 road runs between Hastings and Margate, via Ashford, Canterbury, Birchington and Westgate-on-Sea. The A28 crosses the A299 road 3 miles (4.8 km) south-west of Birchington, which leads through north Kent towards London, becoming the M2 motorway at Faversham.

== Culture ==
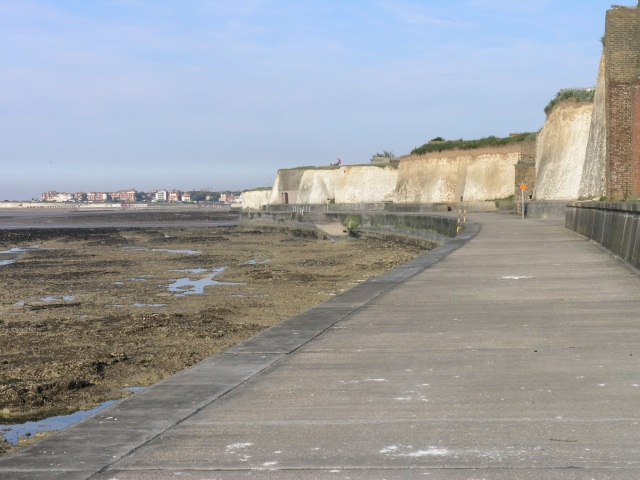
Epple Bay, with sea wall and promenade

Minnis Bay is a popular family beach with attractions such as sailing, windsurfing, cafes, beach huts, public houses, restaurants, a children's playground, a paddling pool and coastal walking/cycling routes. The beach has gained a European Blue Flag Award for its cleanliness and safety. The village has three other smaller beaches, which are surrounded by chalk cliffs and cliff stacks. Wildlife that can be observed in the Thames Estuary includes seals, velvet swimming crabs and the migrant turnstone.

Paintings by local artists are displayed at the David Burley Gallery in Birchington library.

Community activities take place at Birchington Village Centre, including adult education classes, drama productions by the Birchington Guild of Players, concerts by the Birchington Silver Band and performing arts classes by Rhythm Express Performing Arts.

Every year during the first two weeks of Summer, Birchington and Minnis Bay play host to the Scripture Union Beach Mission. Starting in the late 1860's, the mission continues to attract thousands of people for a fortnight of family and Christian based events and activities. The most notable event is the Sixty Minute Splash, an hour long water fight between Kent Fire & Rescue Service and hundreds of children and adults, at The Dip.

In 1989, Birchington was twinned with the town of La Chapelle-d'Armentières, near Lille in northern France; Birchington Twinning Association arranges events between the two communities, such as school trips, concerts and war remembrance services.

Between 1932 and 2006, Birchington held a street carnival each summer.

== Media ==
There are two local weekly newspapers providing news on the Thanet district area: Isle of Thanet Gazette is paid-for and Isle Of Thanet KM Extra is a free newspaper.

There are two local news magazines produced for the people of Birchington: The Birchington Roundabout, which began publishing in April 2003, and The Birchington Forum.

KMFM Thanet is a radio station on frequency 107.2FM. Community radio station Academy FM (Thanet) launched in 2010 on 107.8FM.

More recently, Birchington Together CIC starting publishing a monthly magazine/newsletter, Birchington Buzz. In February 2017, The Isle of Thanet News was started.

== Sport and leisure ==
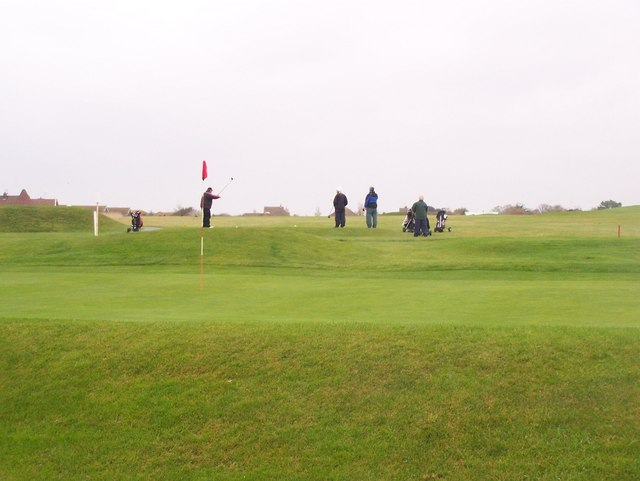
Westgate and Birchington Golf Course

Several teams compete in local leagues:

- Birchington United Services Club runs a football team in the Thanet Sunday Football League Premier Division and a netball team in the Thanet and District Netball League,
- Birchington Chess Club competes in the Thanet League.

Westgate and Birchington Golf Club has an 18-hole 4,877-yard (4,460 m) course on the cliff tops between Westgate and Birchington.

Birchington Bridge Club meets twice a week at the Our Lady and St Benedict's Church Hall. A football pitch is provided at the council-owned Birchington Recreation Ground.

As a seaside resort, the village has several clubs for water sports. Minnis Bay Sailing Club, founded in 1950, is a dinghy and catamaran club where members can sail for fun, but competitions are also held most weekends. Speed boats, jet skis and water skis can be launched near the beach at Beresford Gap by members of Beresford Wakeboard and Water Ski Club, which was established in 2004 to help alleviate anti-social behaviour in the area. Anglers are catered for by Birchington Sea Angling Society.

Brownies, Girl Guides, Cubs and Scouts have a large membership in the area. In operation since the 1960s, Birchington Youth Club became Target Youth Hub in 2017.

== Quex House and Park ==
Quex House as an Auxiliary Military Hospital during World War I

To the south of the village is Quex House, a 200 year-old manor house situated in 250 acres (1.0 km^{2}) of parkland and gardens. Several rooms, decorated with oriental and English period furniture, are open to visitors, and guided tours are provided. The Powell-Cotton Museum houses three galleries of stuffed animal displays, depicting more than 500 African and Asian animals in their natural habitats.

Further galleries display a vast collection of African artefacts, European firearms, European and Asian edged weapons, European and Chinese porcelain, with important archaeological finds from Thanet and east Kent. The total number of artefacts has not been counted, though the ethnography items alone total approximately 18,000.

Percy Powell-Cotton was born in 1866, and was a major in the Northumberland Fusiliers. His expeditions were conducted for scientific research, sometimes lasting up to 18 months. In 1896, he founded the Powell-Cotton Museum at Quex Park to display his collection of mammals and artefacts acquired on his expeditions. The animals were mounted by the noted taxidermist Rowland Ward.

During World War I, Quex House became an auxiliary military hospital, run by the Birchington Voluntary Aid Detachment. In 1923, the Memorial Ground was donated to the village by Mr H.A. Erlebach for sport and recreational use; he owned the village's former Woodfood House School and purchased land from the Quex House estate for it. He gave the southern part of the land to the people of Birchington and dedicated it in memory of his three sons, who had been killed in World War I. The land is now owned by Thanet District Council.

== Notable residents ==
Residents of Birchington have included the British screenwriter Tudor Gates, who wrote a number of stories about female vampires for Hammer Studios in the early 1970s. Gates died in the village in January 2007.

On 4 February 1882, Pre-Raphaelite illustrator, painter, translator and poet Dante Gabriel Rossetti travelled to the house of friend, Westcliff Bungalow, in the village, in an attempt to recuperate from ill-health. He died on 10 April, Easter Sunday, that year and was buried in the churchyard of All Saints, with a tombstone designed by fellow artist, Ford Madox Brown.

Composer Rosalind Ellicott, who lived in Seasalter, is buried near her parents (Note: Her father was Charles Ellicott, the Bishop of Gloucester and Bristol.) in Birchington churchyard.

Another notable resident was Solomon J. Solomon, a Victorian British painter, founding member of the New English Art Club and member of the Royal Academy. In 1905, he bought White Cliff, one of the Tower Bungalows in Spencer Road. He later died in Birchington on 27 July 1927, before being buried at Willesden United Synagogue Cemetery in London.

== See also ==
- Listed buildings in Birchington-on-Sea
