= Eshowe =

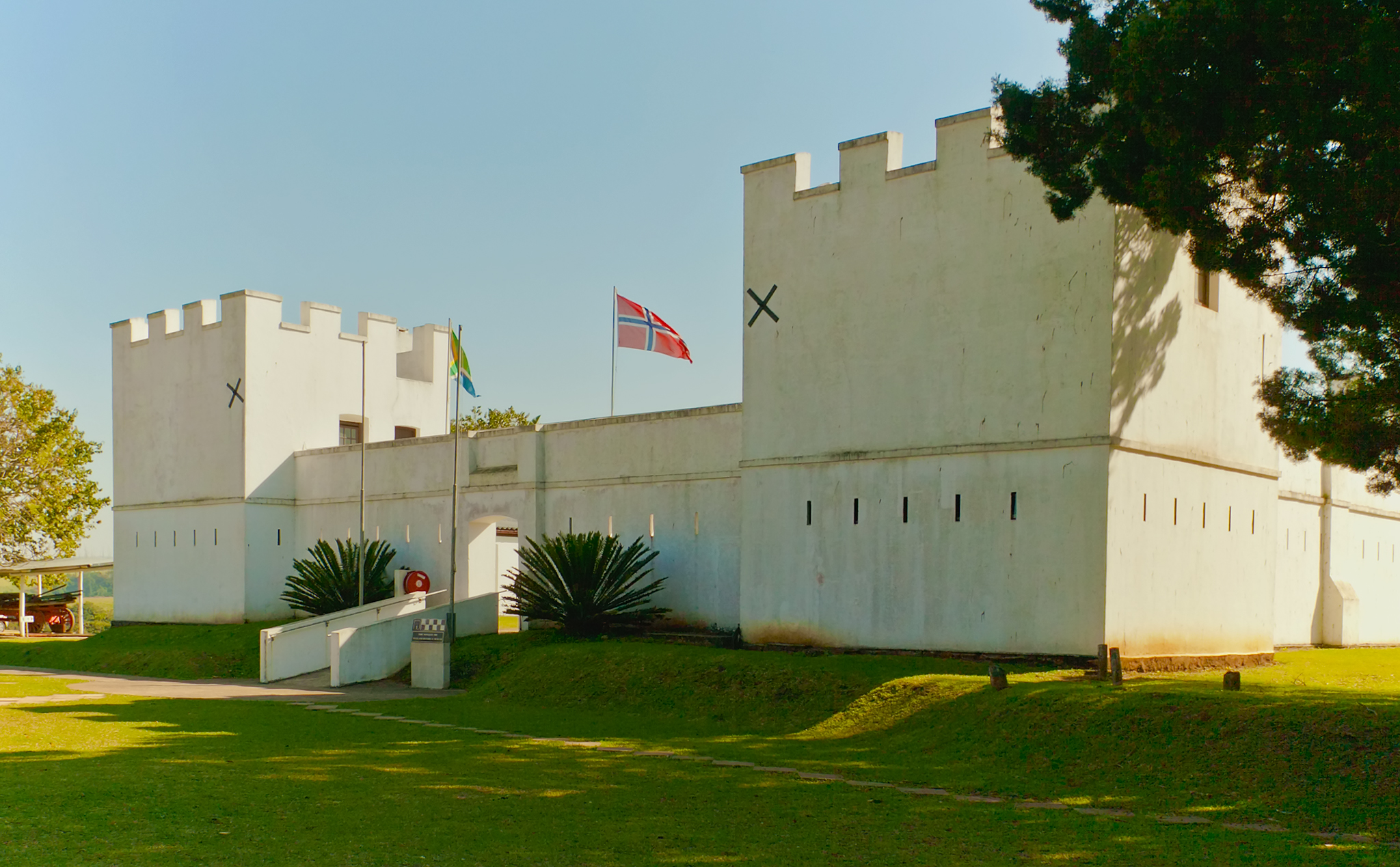
- Fort Nongqayi in Eshowe

- Location within KwaZulu-Natal Location within South Africa
- Coordinates: 28°53′18″S 31°26′54″E
- Country: South Africa
- Province: KwaZulu-Natal
- District: King Cetshwayo
- Municipality: uMlalazi
- Established: 1880

Area
  - Total: 18.23 km^{2} (7.04 sq mi)

Population (2011)
  - Total: 14,744
  - Density: 808.8/km^{2} (2,095/sq mi)

Racial makeup (2011)
  - Black African: 82.7%
  - Coloured: 5.0%
  - Indian/Asian: 4.6%
  - White: 7.4%
  - Other: 0.4%

First languages (2011)
  - Zulu: 75.8%
  - English: 17.5%
  - Afrikaans: 2.9%
  - S. Ndebele: 1.2%
  - Other: 2.6%
- Time zone: UTC+2 (SAST)
- Postal code (street): 3815
- PO box: 3815
- Area code: 035

Eshowe is the oldest town of European settlement in Zululand, historically also known as Eziqwaqweni, Ekowe or kwaMondi. Eshowe's name is said to be inspired by the sound of wind blowing through the more than 4 km^{2} of the indigenous Dlinza Forest, the most important and striking feature of the town. Although the name is most likely to be derived from the Zulu word for the Xysmalobium shrubs, showe or shongwe.

Today Eshowe is a market town, with a 100 km radius catchment area, two shopping centres, a main bus station serving the hinterland, a major hospital, and several schools.

== History ==
In 1860 Cetshwayo, then only a Zulu prince, built a kraal here and named the place Eziqwaqweni (the abode of robbers). A mission station was established at Eshowe in 1861 once permission had been obtained from the Zulu King Cetshwayo by Norwegian missionary, the Reverend Ommund Oftebro. Later the station was called the KwaMondi Mission Station (place of Mondi) after the Zulu name which was given to Oftebro.

== Siege of Eshowe ==
During the Anglo-Zulu War of 1879, Colonel Charles Pearson led the coastal column to Eshowe. This column encountered part of the Zulu army at the Nyezane River, but after a short battle pushed on to the KwaMondi Mission which was fortified and called Fort Ekowe. The forces under Colonel Pearson were besieged for 10 weeks until relieved on April 3 by Lord Chelmsford after the Battle of Gingindlovu.

After the British evacuated the area, Fort Ekowe was burned down by the Zulus.

== Capital of Zululand ==
After the war Eshowe was established as the capital of Zululand and the home of the British resident in Zululand, Melmoth Osborne. The nearby town of Melmoth is named after him.

In 1887 Eshowe became the capital of Zululand and was officially declared a township in 1891.

In 1947 the British Royal Family (King George VI, Queen Elizabeth, Princess Elizabeth and Princess Margaret) visited and were welcomed in Eshowe by King Cyprian. The family toured the Dlinza Forest and spent a night in 'The Residency' in Eshowe.

Eshowe served as the seat of the first Black Diocesan Bishops in South Africa, of the Anglican and Roman Catholic Church. Eshowe is still the seat of the Bishop of the Anglican Diocese of Zululand.

== Nearby nature conservation areas ==
- iSimangaliso Wetland Park
- Hluhluwe-Umfolozi Game Reserve
- Itala Game Reserve
- Lubombo Transfrontier Conservation Area

== Notable people ==
- Malusi Gigaba, politician, former national minister
- Dawn Thandeka King, actress
- Hezekiel Ntuli (1912–1973), sculptor in unfired clay
- Culoe De Song, music producer, DJ, recording artist
