= Oxford Aspire =

Oxford Aspire is a consortium of the Oxford University Museums and the Oxfordshire County Council Museums Service. It was established in April 2012 as one of the 16 Major Partner Museum services nationwide funded by Arts Council England when ACE took over funding for Museums from Museums Libraries and Archives (MLA).

The consortium includes the following museums:

- The Ashmolean Museum
- Museum of the History of Science, University of Oxford
- Oxford University Museum of Natural History
- Pitt Rivers Museum
- The Oxfordshire Museum

As part of their activity Oxford ASPIRE runs a programme of knowledge sharing events for the sector around the themes of Fundraising and Philanthropy, Commercial Enterprise, Managing Museums and Digital.

In March 2015 ASPIRE will be running a new leadership programme for the sector called Oxford Cultural Leaders. This week-long residential for established and emerging cultural sector leaders will be delivered in partnership with the Saïd Business School.
