= Percy Powell-Cotton =

British hunter and explorer

Percy Horace Gordon Powell-Cotton
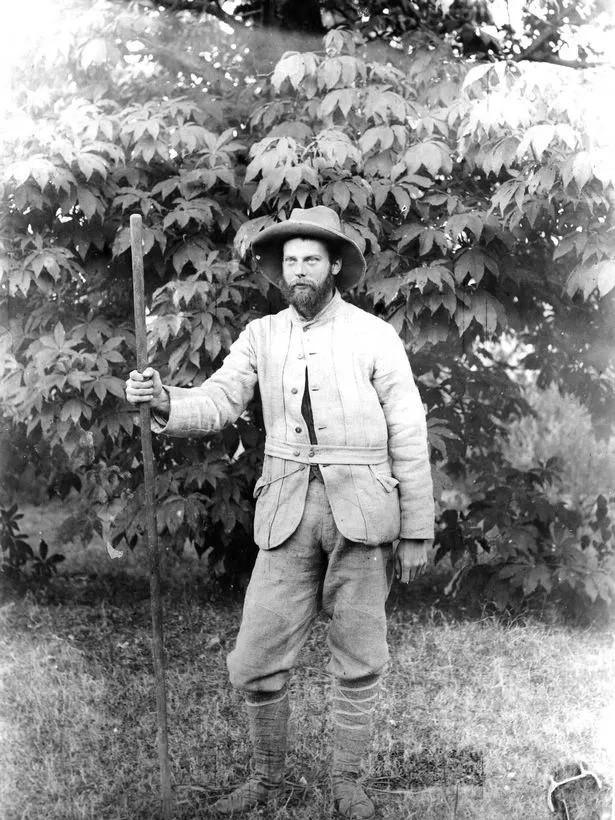
- Born: 20 September 1866; Garlinge, Margate, England
- Died: 26 June 1940 (aged 73); Midhurst, Sussex, England
- Education: Hythe School of Musketry
- Occupations: Hunter, explorer, conservationist
- Spouse: Hannah Brayton Slater
- Children: Diana Powell-Cotton; Antoinette Powell-Cotton; Mary Powell-Cotton; Christopher Powell-Cotton
- Parent(s): Henry Horace Powell-Cotton; Matilda Christina (née Gordon)
- Relatives: Ida Powell-Cotton; Gerald Powell-Cotton

Major Percy Horace Gordon Powell-Cotton, FZS, FRGS, FRAI, JP (20 September 1866 – 26 June 1940) was an English explorer and hunter. He is most noted for the creation of the Powell-Cotton Museum in the grounds of his home, Quex Park in Birchington-on-Sea, Kent, England. Powell-Cotton is noted for bringing an extraordinary number of animal specimens back from his travels across Africa, potentially creating the largest collection of game ever shot by one man. Despite this, Powell-Cotton was an early conservationist, helping to categorise a wide number of species across the globe. His two daughters, Antoinette Powell-Cotton and Diana Powell-Cotton shared his passion for conservation, and pursued archaeology and anthropology respectively.

Powell-Cotton made a large number of films (Powell-Cotton filmography) including ethnographic, documentary and wildlife films (Powell-Cotton Ethnographic Films).

== Early life ==
Percy Powell-Cotton was born on 20 September 1866, in Garlinge, Margate, to Henry Horace Powell-Cotton and Matilda Christina (née Gordon). Powell-Cotton had two siblings: a sister, Ida and a brother, Gerald. Most of Powell-Cotton's early life was spent in London, although he joined his family on many weekend and summer trips to their home in Margate. Aged fifteen, Powell-Cotton helped his father modernise Quex House, before the family returned to live there. Whilst living there, Powell-Cotton began breeding chickens, hunting rabbits and photographing wildlife. He kept meticulous records of these endeavours, a habit that would follow him into later life.

== Military career ==
Powell-Cotton joined the Militia Battalion of Northumberland Fusiliers in 1885, and attended the Hythe School of Musketry for training. During the Second Boer War, Powell-Cotton served in the Volunteer Regiment of the 5th Battalion, who were stationed in Malta. In July 1901, he retired from military service. However, at the outbreak of World War I in July 1914, Powell-Cotton offered himself up for military service. He was turned away as, at 48, he was considered too old to serve. In lieu of serving in the war, Powell-Cotton offered his home, Quex House, to the Birchington Volunteer Aid Detachment to use as an Auxiliary Military Hospital.

== Expeditions ==
Powell-Cotton embarked on over 28 expeditions between 1887 and 1939, across Africa and Asia, gathering various zoological and ethnographic specimens

In 1900, Powell-Cotton met with Emperor Menelik II, who granted him permission to hunt across Ethiopia. Powell-Cotton's subsequent expedition across Ethiopia formed the basis of his first book, A Sporting Trip Through Abyssinia. In 1902 he was in Uganda and Kenya, visiting Lake Baringo.

In November 1905, whilst on an expedition in Kenya, Powell-Cotton married Hannah Brayton Slater in Nairobi Cathedral. To save interrupting his ninth expedition, his new wife chose to join him on his expedition, for a honeymoon that lasted two years.

In 1907, still on his honeymoon expedition, Powell-Cotton was badly mauled by a lion he had thought incapacitated by a precious shot. As he approached it, the lion leapt up and attacked with its claws and jaw. Powell-Cotton escaped relatively unharmed due to a rolled up copy of Punch magazine in his breast pocket protecting him from the majority of the lion's attacks. The lion, the suit that Powell-Cotton was wearing, and the copy of Punch are now all on display at the Powell-Cotton Museum.

Powell-Cotton's expeditions directly led to the creation of the Powell-Cotton Museum. After bringing back a range of zoological specimens from his early travels, Powell-Cotton contracted British taxidermist and big-game hunter Rowland Ward to prepare the animals for display. Whilst on an expedition through India in 1896, Powell-Cotton enlisted his brother Gerald to oversee the construction of the Powell-Cotton Museum on the grounds of Quex House.

Whilst on his expeditions, Powell-Cotton created a wide range of ethnographic documentary films about the peoples and animals of the countries he visited. In later life, he collaborated with his daughter Diana, who further added to the filmography after Powell-Cotton died.

The wide range of animal specimens that Powell-Cotton returned with from his travels have proved to be a valuable resource in taxonomic research, even in the present day. Consequentially, Powell-Cotton has several species named in honour of him.

== Bibliography ==
- Powell-Cotton, P. H. G. (1902). A sporting trip through Abyssinia : a narrative of a nine months' journey from the plains of the Hawash to the snows of Simien, with a description of the game, from elephant to ibex, and notes on the manners and customs of the natives. Rowland Ward.
- Powell-Cotton, P. H. G. (1904). In unknown Africa; a narrative of twenty months' travel and sport in unknown lands and among new tribes. Hurst & Blackett.

== Publications ==
- Major Powell-Cotton, Notes on a Journey through East Africa and Northern Uganda Journal of the Royal African Society, Vol. 3, No. 12 (Jul. 1904), pp. 315–324
- P.H.G. Powell-Cotton, A Journey Through Northern Uganda The Geographical Journal, Vol. 24, No. 1 (Jul. 1904), pp. 56–65
- P.H.G. Powell-Cotton, A Journey Through the Eastern Portion of the Congo State The Geographical Journal, Vol. 30, No. 4 (Oct. 1907), pp. 371–382
- P.H.G. Powell-Cotton, Notes on a Journey through the Great Ituri Forest Journal of the Royal African Society, Vol. 7, No. 25 (Oct. 1907), pp. 1–12
- P.H.G. Powell-Cotton, 1. Notes on Crossbows and Arrows from French Equatorial Africa Man Vol. 29, (Jan. 1929), pp. 1–3
- P.H.G. Powell-Cotton, H. J. Braunholtz 132. A Mancala Board Called "Songo." Man, Vol. 31, (Jul. 1931), p. 123
- P.H.G. Powell-Cotton, 329. Benin Brass Castings and Handicrafts in the Cameroons. Man, Vol. 32, (Dec. 1932), p. 284
- P.H.G. Powell-Cotton, 4. Note on the Native Custom of Carrying Stones in the Mouth, Collected Feb.-March 1932, French Cameroons. Man, Vol. 33, (Jan. 1933), pp. 9–10

== See also ==
- Taxonomic contributions of Major P. H. G. Powell-Cotton
- Powell-Cotton Museum
- Quex Park
- Diana and Antoinette Powell-Cotton
- List of famous big game hunters
