= Powell-Cotton filmography =

This is a filmography of the Powell-Cotton family, including films by Percy Powell-Cotton and Diana and Antoinette Powell-Cotton.

== 1920–1929 ==
- N. Nigeria, Major P.H.G Powell-Cotton, (1924–1925)
- French Congo, Major P.H.G. Powell-Cotton, (1926–1927)
- Gorilla Drive, Cameroons, Major P.H.G Powell-Cotton, (1929)

== 1930–1939 ==
- Crafts in the Cameroons (or Cameroon Crafts), Major P.H.G. Powell-Cotton, (1931)
- Cameroons, Major P.H.G. Powell-Cotton, (1931)
- Osonigbe Juju House & Benin Brass Casting, Major P.H.G. Powell-Cotton, (1931)
- Some tribes of the Southern Sudan, Major P.H.G. Powell-Cotton, (1933)
- Sudan 1933 Lango people only, Major P.H.G. Powell-Cotton, (1933)
- Somaliland: Pot Making, Dr. D. Powell-Cotton, (1934)
- Italian Somaliland: Cattle Tending, Butter Making etc, Dr. D. Powell-Cotton, (1934)
- Somaliland: bread making, pillow making, bow-string making, Major P.H.G. Powell-Cotton and Dr. D. Powell-Cotton (1934–35)
- Somaliland: Beard plucking, Koran School, Major P.H.G. Powell-Cotton and Dr. D. Powell-Cotton, (1934–35)
- Italian Somaliland: Making a (winnowing) basket, Major P.H.G. Powell-Cotton and Dr. D. Powell-Cotton, (1934–35)
- Somaliland: Mat making, Major P.H.G. Powell-Cotton and Dr. D. Powell-Cotton, (1934)
- Somaliland: Skinning, Major P.H.G. Powell-Cotton and Dr. D. Powell-Cotton, (1934)
- Morocco: Pot making, Major P.H.G. Powell-Cotton & Mrs H.B. Powell-Cotton, (1936)
- Angola: Dombondola Potter, Dr. D. Powell-Cotton and Miss A. Powell-Cotton, (1936)
- Angola: Scenes from a household (Dombondola), Dr. D. Powell-Cotton and Miss A. Powell-Cotton, (1936)
- Angola: Chokwe potter (or Angolan Potter), Dr. D. Powell-Cotton and Miss A. Powell-Cotton, (1936)
- Angola: N’ganguela bark cloth making, Dr. D. Powell-Cotton and Miss A. Powell-Cotton, (1937)
- Angola: Kwanyama day & fishing, Dr. D. Powell-Cotton and Miss A. Powell-Cotton, (1936-7)
- Angola: Kwanyama skinning & dressing skins, Dr. D. Powell-Cotton and Miss A. Powell-Cotton, (1936–37)
- Angola: Kwanyama Mining & Smelting, Dr. D. Powell-Cotton and Miss A. Powell-Cotton, (1936–37)
- Angola: Kwanyama potter’s methods in building pots, Dr. D. Powell-Cotton and Miss A. Powell-Cotton, (1936–37)
- Angola: Kwanyama Efendula, Dr. D. Powell-Cotton and Miss A. Powell-Cotton (1937)
- Angola: Kwanyama Medicine woman initiation, Dr. D. Powell-Cotton and Miss A. Powell-Cotton, (1937)
- SW Africa & Angola, Major P.H.G. Powell Cotton & Mr C Powell Cotton (1937)
- Tanganyika: Serengeti Park, Major & Mrs. P.H.G. Powell-Cotton (1938–39)
- Tanganyika: Two Potters and making beer strainers, Major & Mrs. P.H.G. Powell-Cotton (1938–39)

== 1950–1959 ==
- British East Africa, Dr. D. Powell Cotton (1950)
- British East Africa, Dr. D. Powell Cotton (1951)
- Serengeti, British East Africa, Dr. D. Powell Cotton (1951)
- British East Africa, Dr. D. Powell Cotton (1952)
- South Africa: Kruger National Park, Mr C. Powell-Cotton & Dr. D. Powell-Cotton (1950s)
- South Africa: The Victoria Falls, Mr C. Powell-Cotton & Dr. D. Powell-Cotton (1950s)
- South Africa: Victoria Falls & Livingstone Game Park, Mr C. Powell-Cotton & Dr. D. Powell-Cotton (1950s)
- Uganda: Scenes in Uganda, Mr C. Powell-Cotton & Dr. D. Powell-Cotton (1950s)
- Uganda: Lake Edward Game Reserve, Mr C. Powell-Cotton & Dr. D. Powell-Cotton (1950s)
- Uganda: The Murchinson Falls Park, Mr C. Powell-Cotton & Dr. D. Powell-Cotton (1950-54)
- Tanzania: Serengeti National Park, Mr C. Powell-Cotton & Dr. D. Powell-Cotton (1950 – 52)
- West Uganda: Q.E, National Park, Mr C. Powell-Cotton (1952-53)
- West Uganda: Queen Elizabeth National Park, Western Uganda, Mr C. Powell-Cotton & Dr. D. Powell-Cotton (1952-53)
- Animals of East Africa, Mr.C.Powell-Cotton and Dr.D.Powell-Cotton (1952—53)
- Uganda: Some events in Lango District, Mr C Powell-Cotton (1954)
- West Uganda: Murchinson Falls National Park, Mr C Powell-Cotton & Dr D Powell-Cotton (1954)
- West Uganda: Game on the Headwaters of the Nile, Mr C Powell-Cotton & Dr D Powell-Cotton (1954)
- West Uganda: Murchison Falls (National Park), Mr C Powell-Cotton & Dr. D. Powell-Cotton (1954)
- Uganda: Kumam people, Dr. D. Powell-Cotton (1954)
- Northern Province, Uganda: Country Shows, Mr. C. Powell-Cotton (1954)
- Uganda: Scenes from the Northern Province, Mr C. Powell-Cotton (1955)
- Uganda: Some Scenes in Lango District, Mr C. Powell-Cotton (1956)
- Some dances of Northern Uganda, Dr. D. Powell-Cotton and Mr. C. Powell-Cotton. (1958)

== 1960–1969 ==
- Uganda: A Journey through Uganda, Mr C. Powell-Cotton (1962–63)
- Kenya: Wildlife in Kenya, Mr C..Powell-Cotton and Dr. D. Powell-Cotton (1963)
- Kenya: Wildlife in Kenya Dr. D. Powell-Cotton (1965)
- Kenya: Tsavo National Park, Dr.D.Powell-Cotton and Mr C. Powell-Cotton (1965)
- Uganda: Two National Parks of Uganda, Mr C. Powell-Cotton and Dr. D. Powell-Cotton (1965)
- Some Animals of Northern Tanganyika, Dr. D. Powell-Cotton (1965)
- Uganda/Tanzania: Animals of Kenya & Tanzania, Dr. D. Powell-Cotton (1967)

== 1970–1979 ==
- Kenya: Pelican Dr. D. Powell-Cotton (1970)
- Kenya: Flamingo Dr. D. Powell-Cotton (1970)
- Kenya: Birds of the Rift Valley, Dr. D. Powell-Cotton (1971)
- Kenya: Birds of the Rift Valley lakes and shores, Dr. .D. Powell-Cotton (1972—75)
- Kenya: animals and Birds of Kenya, Dr. D. Powell-Cotton (1973)
