= Diana and Antoinette Powell-Cotton =

English anthropologists sisters

Dr Diana Powell-Cotton
- Born: 1908; England
- Died: 1986 (aged 77–78); Norfolk, England
- Education: Royal Academy of Art
- Occupation: Doctor
- Parent(s): Percy Powell-Cotton; Hannah Powell-Cotton

Antoinette Powell-Cotton
- Born: 1913; England
- Died: 1997 (aged 83–84); England
- Occupations: Nurse and archaeologist
- Parent(s): Percy Powell-Cotton; Hannah Powell-Cotton

Diana Powell-Cotton (1908–1986) and Antoinette Powell-Cotton (1915–1997) were English sisters who worked together as anthropologists.

== Early life ==
Diana was born in 1908 and Antoinette in 1913. They were two of the four children of Percy Powell-Cotton and his wife Hannah Powell-Cotton, along with Mary (1910–1998) and Christopher (1918–2006). Diana studied at the Royal College of Art, where she gained valuable skills in drawing, watercolour and sketching. Antoinette did not undertake any formal training, but showed an interest in anthropology in her teens. This led her to volunteer in the Pitt Rivers Museum in Oxford in the early 1930s, under the direction of Henry Balfour, who was the curator of the Pitt Rivers Museum at the time.

== First expeditions ==
Diana travelled with her father to the Sudan in 1933and then organised her own expedition to the Italian Somiliand in 1934–1935.She kept precise field notes and also filmed domestic activities such as butter-making. She also used the artistic skills to make fine pen drawings of everyday objects she collected. In addition to volunteering with the Pitt Rivers Museum, Antoinette also helped at the Powell-Cotton Museum at her home. In 1935 she took her first trip to Africa with her father. During this trip to Zululand she developed an interest in women's activities, and much of what she recorded related to practices such as hairdressing and jewellery.

=== Angola and Namibia: 1936 and 1937 ===
In March 1936 the sisters started their first trip to Angola.The aim of the trip was to document the lives, traditions and customs of indigenous peoples. They were concerned about the impact of European colonisation and wanted to record customs and traditions before they were lost.

They undertook much preparation for their trip. Before their trip started, Diana undertook several months of work in a hospital in Margate, so that she could treat any possible injuries and bouts of illness. When they arrived in Africa they bought a truck, which they used for getting around between areas of interest. For example, in preparation for their 1937 trip they purchased a number of books which included maps, dictionaries and copies of the New Testament in native languages. They also took several anthropological books. To gain permission for the trip they had to justify their costs. The trips were expensive and had to cover the purchase of a truck, buying native objects, petrol and food. In total the cost of each trip, excluding return trips came to four hundred pounds.
The majority of the natives they worked with belonged to the Kwanayma group in southern Angola and the Ovambo group in Namibia. At this time, Namibia was under control of the South African government and Angola belonged to Portugal. In preparation for their work in Angola the sisters familiarised themselves with Portuguese.Their final collection of objects shows a particular preference for Ovambo artefacts, which is high compared to the other objects collected from other groups.

== Work undertaken ==
Both wrote field notes on their expedition as a way of recording their work and observations. These included detailed descriptions of objects, as well as traditions and rituals they observed. As part of their work they also collected objects of interest. Often these objects had been in use already. They made precise lists of the objects they collected. One example was their observations of plans used in medical practice. For every plant they recorded what its purpose was, the location it was found and who it was used by. The sisters bought most of their objects when they visited villages and communities. Often the natives lacked experience of selling objects and putting a price on possessions. The sisters did not always find it easy to buy things from the locals, who sometimes did not want to sell. Altogether their final collection of artefacts totalled almost 2000 on their first trip and 1000 on their second.

The sisters used film as a means of documenting family life and traditional customs of the people they were observing. In total they shot over four hours of film on a Kodak camera. One example of this is 'A Typical Day in the Life of a Kwanyama Family', which shows everyday life in a traditional village. Several of their films were shown at the Royal Anthropological Institute and were shown to the public at the Powell-Cotton Museum. In addition the British Film Institute was a recipient of several of their films. They also took many photographs of objects, people and places to help document their work in addition to their fieldnotes and objects they collected. Most of the film and photography work was done by Diana.

Diana and Antoinette only had one work based on the expeditions published, an article entitled "Feminine Coiffure in Angola: Much Adorned Girls of West Africa", which displayed a number of photographs of adornments worn by women. It was published in the Illustrated London News in 1937. They were subsequently approached to write an account of their expeditions for a general audience, but they declined, as they wanted any published work to be academic.

Despite this, their artefacts and images were sought after by other institutions. For example, Joan Lillico from the Wellcome Historical Medical Museum in London asked to use Diana and Antoinette's fieldnotes and photographs for her own research. They gave portions of the objects and artefacts they brought back, as well as some of their fieldnotes, to several museums. These included The British Museum, the Pitt Rivers Museum and the Cambridge University Museum of Archeology and Anthropology.

== Later life ==
In 1939, when World War II broke out, Diana and Antoinette both volunteered in war hospitals in London. Diana trained as a doctor and Antoinette trained as a nurse. Neither of them married. Diana later moved back to Africa to practice medicine. She then moved to the Rift Valley in 1967 to continue her photography and died in Norfolk in 1986.
Antionette helped work for the Powell-Cotton Museum alongside her nursing. Between 1938 and 1974 she undertook some big local excavations and helped contribute to the content of the Powell-Cotton Museum.
