= Quex Park =

Historic house museum in Birchington-on-Sea, Kent, England

Coordinates: 51.367°N 1.321°E

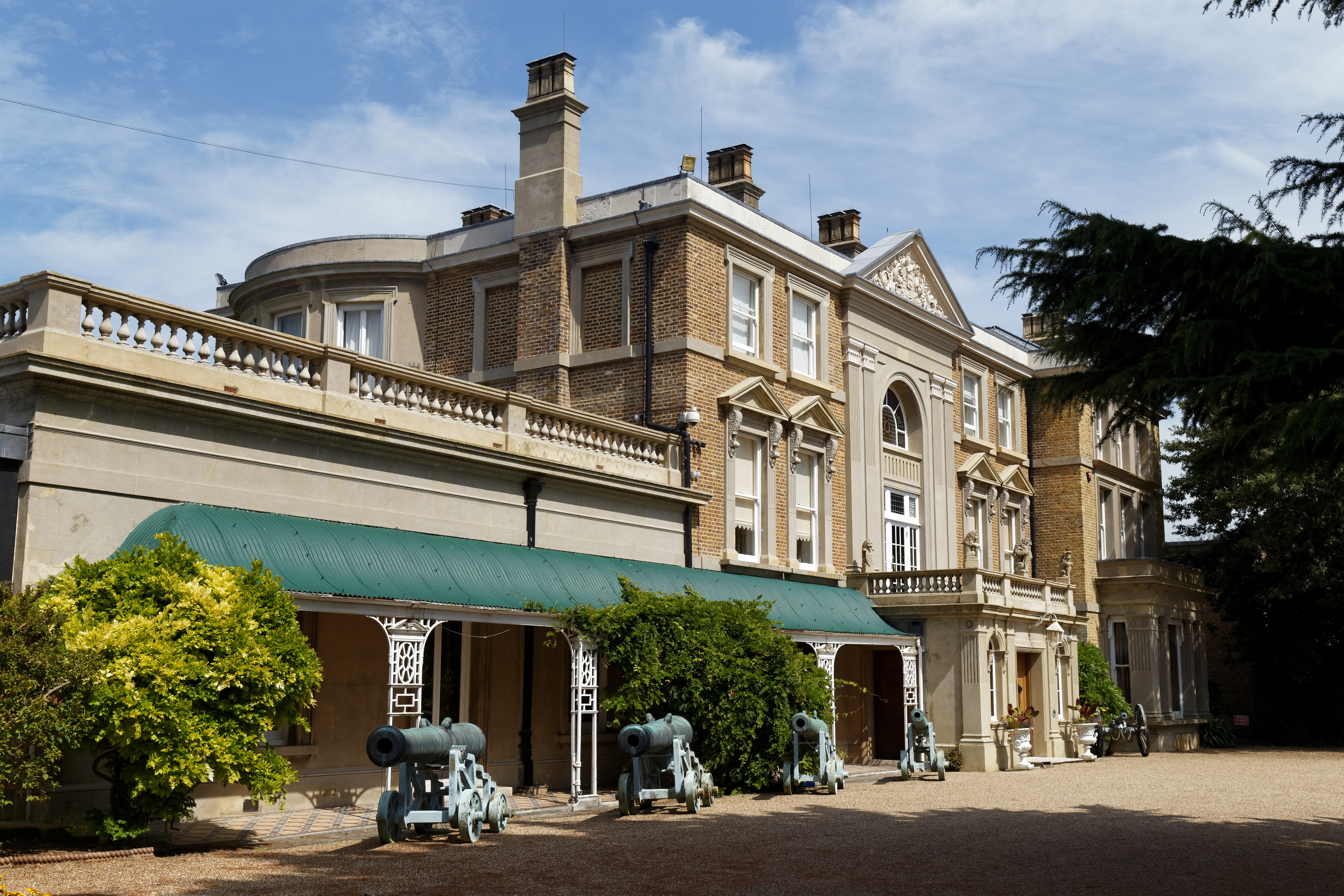
South front of Quex House

Quex House as an Auxiliary Military Hospital during the First World War

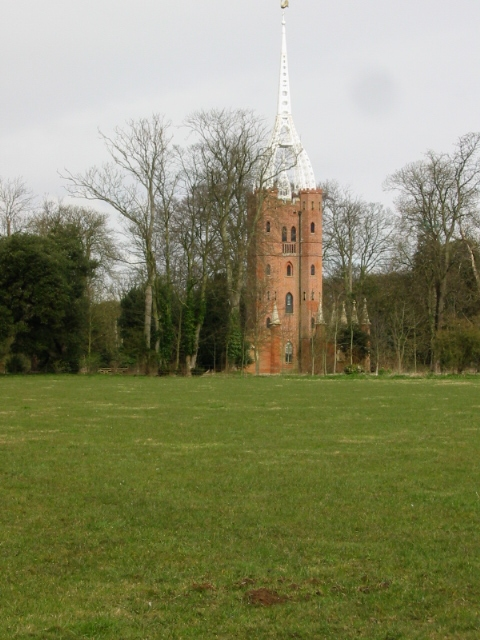
Waterloo Tower

Quex Park itself is 250 acres (1.0 km^{2}) of parkland and gardens plus a further 1500 acres of farmed land, with Quex House and other buildings situated just south-east from Birchington-on-Sea near Margate in Kent, England. It houses the Powell-Cotton Museum, and the Waterloo tower, a secular bell tower.

== History ==
There has been a house on the Quex site since the early 15th century, and gained its Quex name from the ownership of the rich wool merchant Quekes family in the 16th century. The house was purchased in 1777 by John Powell (d.1783), who died childless. His successive heirs were his nephews Arthur Annesley Roberts (d.1813) who in accordance with the bequest adopted the surname and arms of Powell, and John Powell Roberts (1769-1849), of Holland House, Kingsgate, who in 1814 adopted the surname and arms of Powell. The latter demolished the existing mansion, and replaced it with a regency building. He died childless when his heir became his nephew Henry Perry Cotton.

In the 19th century, the Powell-Cotton family amalgamated two farms to form Quex Park, and began a programme of tree planting and landscaping to create the current park land.

During the First World War, Quex House became an Auxiliary Military Hospital run by the Birchington Voluntary Aid Detachment. In 1923, the Memorial Ground was donated to the village by Mr H. A. Erlebach for sport and recreational use. Erlebach owned the village's now defunct Woodfood House School and purchased land from the Quex House estate for the school. He gave the southern part of the land to the people of Birchington and dedicated it in memory of his three sons who had been killed in the First World War.

It was the base of fictional criminal activities in Dennis Wheatley's 1938 thriller Contraband.

== Powell-Cotton Museum ==
In 1896, Major Percy Horace Gordon Powell-Cotton, F.Z.S., F.R.G.S., a Major in the Northumberland Fusiliers, founded the Powell-Cotton Museum at Quex Park to display his collection of mammals and artefacts acquired on his expeditions to Africa and Asia. The animals were mounted by the noted taxidermist Rowland Ward. His expeditions were conducted for scientific research, and would sometimes take 18 months.

The Powell-Cotton Museum is an Accredited museum housing three galleries of stuffed animal displays, depicting more than 500 African and Asian animals set against their natural habitats. Further galleries display a collection of African artefacts, European firearms, European and Asian cutting weapons, European and Chinese porcelain, and significant archaeological finds from Thanet and East Kent. The total number of artefacts has not been counted, although the ethnography items alone total approximately 18,000. The Powell-Cotton Museum has won numerous awards, including the 'Culture Pros Pick' award at the Museum and Heritage Awards 2014.

== House and gardens ==
A number of rooms in Quex House, decorated with oriental and English period furniture, are open to visitors, and guided tours are provided. The house' gardens and park holds visitor attractions, leisure activities, and retail food and drink outlets. Quex House, the Gun Tower and Waterloo Tower are Grade II listed buildings.

The Waterloo Tower was used as a film location for the BBC 1970s science fiction series Blake's 7 in the episode "Bounty" as Sarkoff's residence.

The Museum and grounds also operate as a corporate event and wedding venue.
