= Powell-Cotton Museum =

Museum in Birchington, Kent, England

The Powell-Cotton Museum

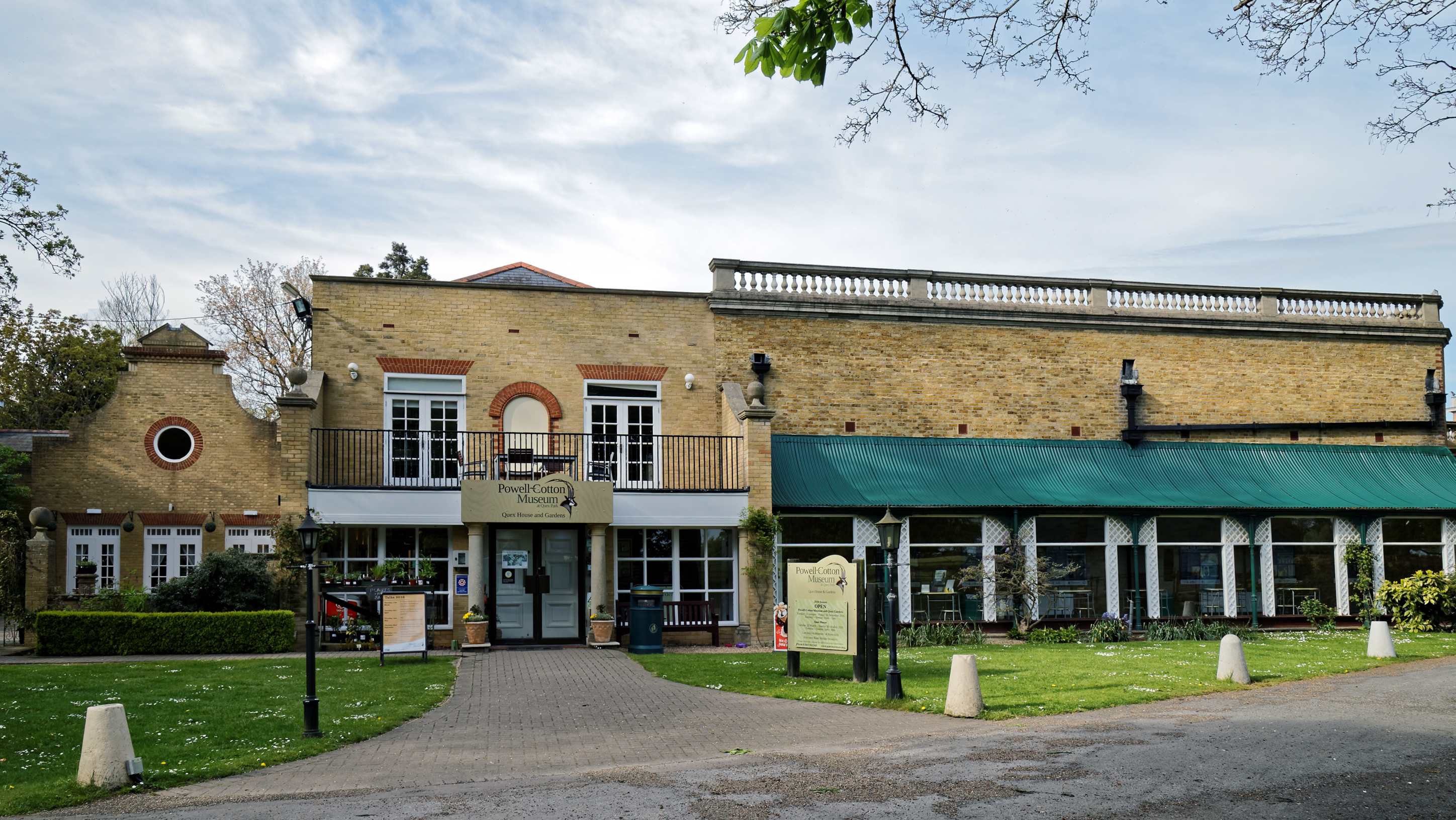
- Front of the museum in May 2016

- Location within Kent
- Established: 1896; 130 years ago
- Location: Birchington, Kent, CT7; United Kingdom
- Coordinates: 51°22′1″N 1°18′51″E
- Type: Natural history and anthropology museum
- Director: Catriona West
- Website: powell-cottonmuseum.org

The Powell-Cotton Museum is situated in Quex Park in Birchington and houses the diverse personal collections of hunter and explorer Percy Powell-Cotton. The museum also contains the collections of Powell-Cotton's two daughters, Antoinette and Diana Powell-Cotton, who shared their father's passion for collecting.

The museum, which links to the ground floor of Quex House, now comprises nine galleries dedicated not only to the extensive collection of large mammals, but to many artefacts representing the cultures and traditions of the locations Powell-Cotton visited.

== Early stages ==
Commencing as a single-room collection in 1896, Percy Powell-Cotton gave the go-ahead to have a pavilion erected in the gardens of Quex House, overseen by his brother, Gerald. Percy enlisted the help of Rowland Ward, renowned in the field of taxidermy at the time, to prepare the animals for display. The former Fusilier had acquired thousands of artefacts through his hunting and conservation expeditions.

After Percy Powell-Cotton's death in 1940, his son Christopher constructed more galleries to incorporate the family collections of archaeology (Antoinette Powell-Cotton), anthropology (Diana Powell-Cotton), ceramics and weaponry.

== Galleries ==
=== Gallery 1 (1947) ===
Houses 3 natural history dioramas, most notably a collection of African monkeys and apes can be found directly opposite the entrance to the gallery. In reference to the primate diorama, it is yet to be equalled in Europe in regard to size and natural diversity. The total number of specimens nearly reaches 2000 in entirety.

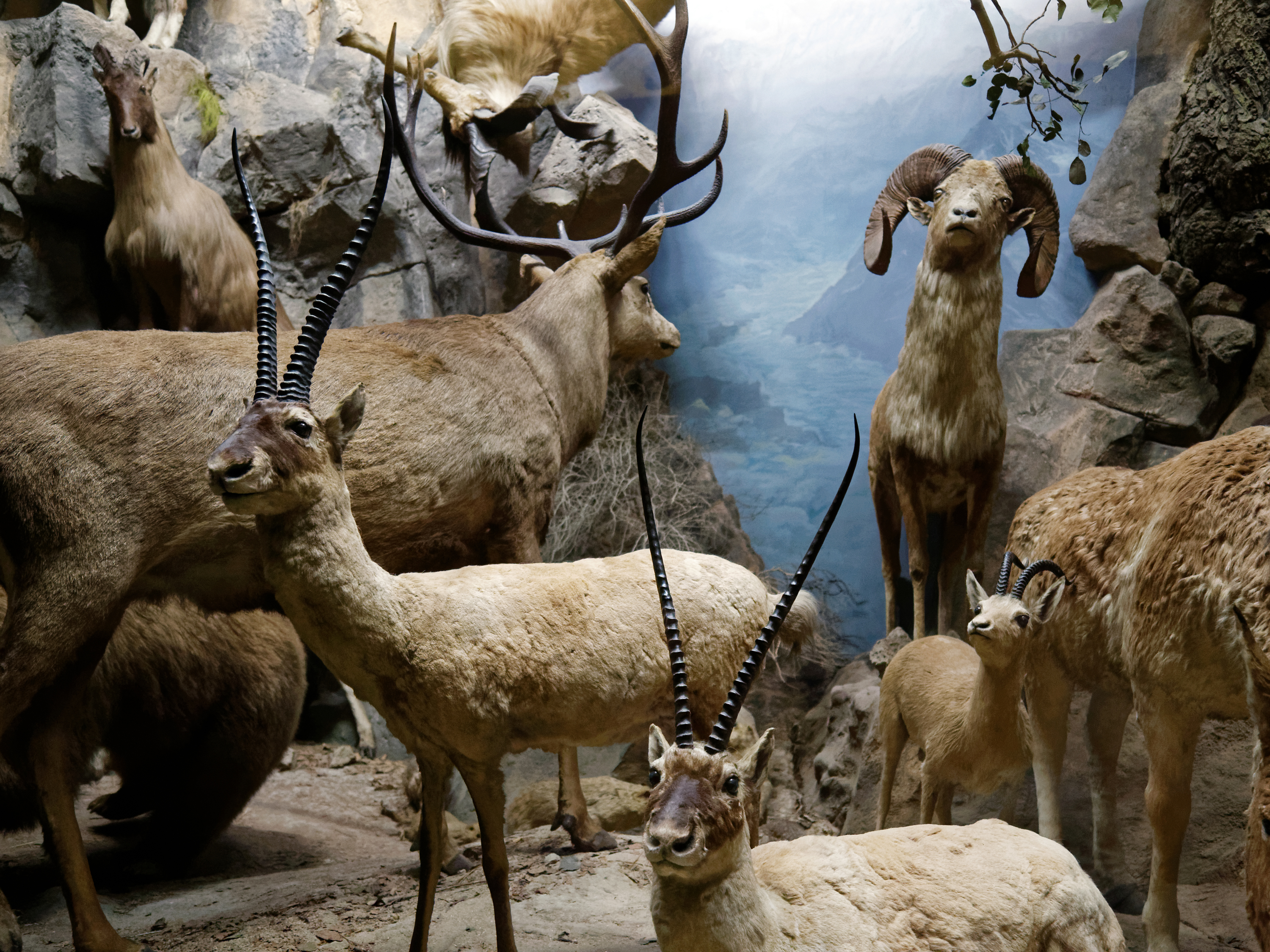
The Himalayan diorama in Gallery 2

=== Gallery 2 (1896) ===
The original pavilion, contains a vast collection of mounted big game heads from Africa and Asia. On the other side of the room, is another large diorama, which depicts the mammals of the Himalayas. To obtain the specific specimens in winter coats, Powell-Cotton had to brave the bitterest of the cold weather season in camp. This is known to be the oldest, unchanged, room-sized Natural History Diorama.

=== Gallery 3 (1908) ===
Dominated by the centre piece in the room depicting the fight between a lion and a buffalo. The lion is the actual animal that attacked and nearly killed Powell-Cotton in 1906, whereas the buffalo is the type specimen of a subspecies named after the hunter/explorer. Additionally in Gallery 3, is another large diorama, this time depicting a scene from Sub-Saharan Africa in which the animals appear to be venturing down to drink at a pool.

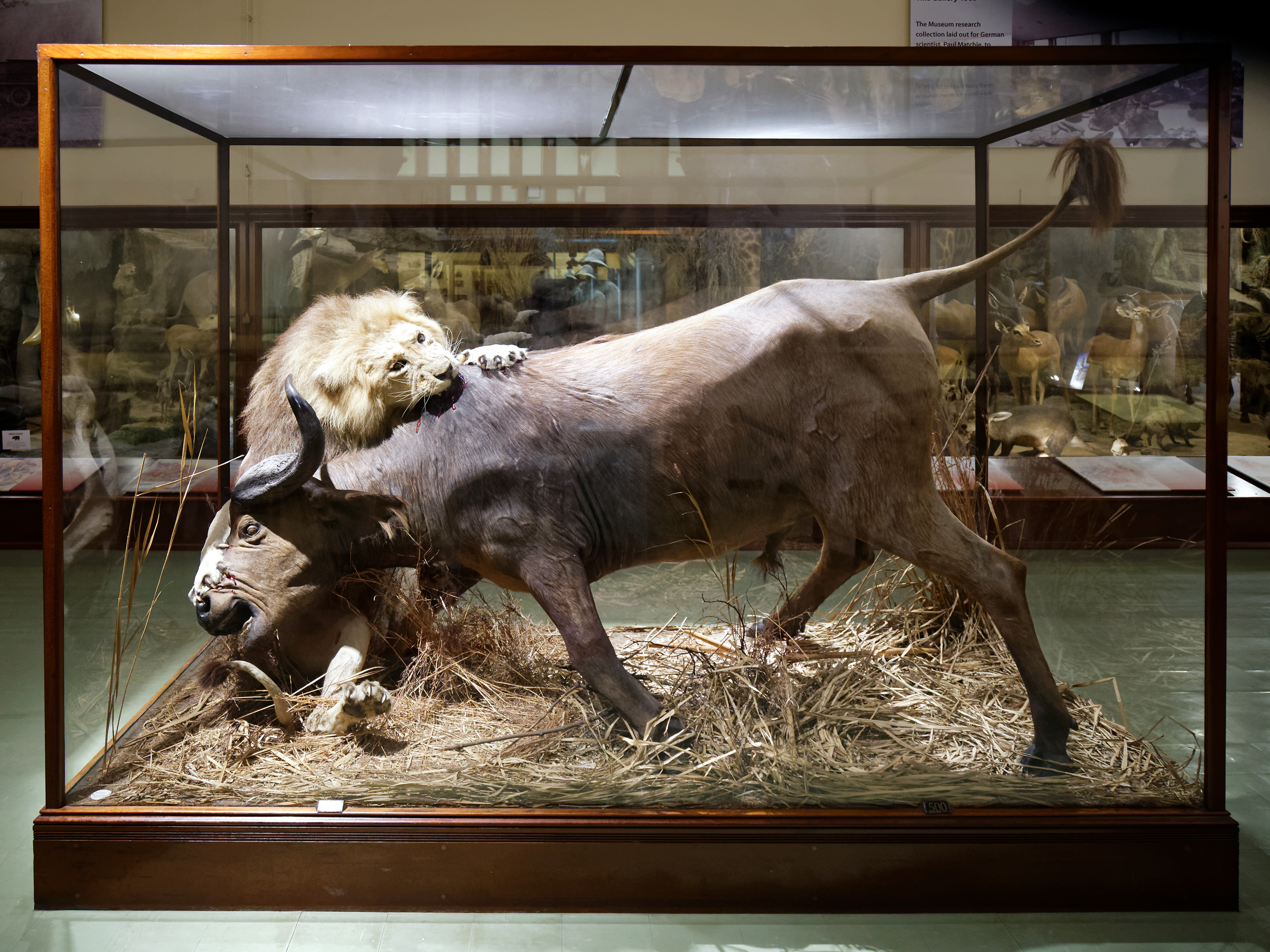
The centre piece display in Gallery 3

=== Gallery 4 (1955) ===
A predominantly media-orientated gallery, including footage shot by the Powell-Cotton sisters showing a typical day in the life of a Kwanyama family. In fact, the museum houses an extensive filmography shot by Percy Powell-Cotton and his two daughters Diana and Antoinette.

=== Gallery 5 (1970) ===
Along with Gallery 6, Gallery 5 contains the ethnographical collections from Africa, focussing on tribal craft such as stools and combs, and items for dress and body decoration. Gallery 6 also displays many field photographs that illustrate the utilisation of the artefacts on show.

=== Gallery 6 (1970) ===
With direct links to Gallery 5, Gallery 6 houses more ethnographical artefacts and includes a model of a farmstead of the Kuanyama people of Angola, along with items of recreation and carefully crafted weaponry.

=== Gallery 7 (1966) ===
Has an archaeological focussed theme and displays the tools of the Paleolithic in east Kent, along with early pottery of the Neolithic. This gallery also documents the Cotton family’s influence in the 18th century China trade.

=== Gallery 8 (1973) ===
Gallery 8 incorporates a collection of Chinese imperial porcelain, ranging from 1662 to 1908. The majority of the collection was bought by Powell-Cotton in 1910.

=== Passage Gallery (1955) ===
Displays a variety of firearms and cutting weapons with origins as far as Malaysia, India and Indonesia, along with a display of a development of military firearms.

== Education ==
The museum promotes educational visits for schools, families and academics and houses a conference room to aid with learning and research in natural and social sciences. Guided tours are also provided by staff with appropriate notice. The Powell-Cotton Museum works under the objective of "in trust for the enjoyment of visitors and the benefit of students", in relation to the legacy of founder.

== Reputation ==
The wide range of specimens and artefacts housed in the museum serve as an important stop for academics and researchers in the field of natural and social science, with opportunities for study available upon appointment. The museum regularly works with The Natural History Museum, London and attracts students from around the world.

The Museum and grounds also operate as a corporate event and wedding venue.

== Location and access ==
The Powell-Cotton Museum is located within Quex Park in Birchington, Kent, 12 miles from Canterbury. The Museum has free parking for cars and coaches and disabled access to all areas of the museum and surrounding gardens.

The nearest national rail station is Birchington on Sea (1 hour 40 minutes from London Victoria) and is an approximate 20 minute walk from the park. Another nearby station is Margate, which is achievable via the high speed service from London St Pancras in 1 hour 20 minutes. By bus, the number 8 Thanet bus stops at Birchington Square, a half-mile walk from the park.
