= Rowland Ward =

British taxidermist (1848-1912)

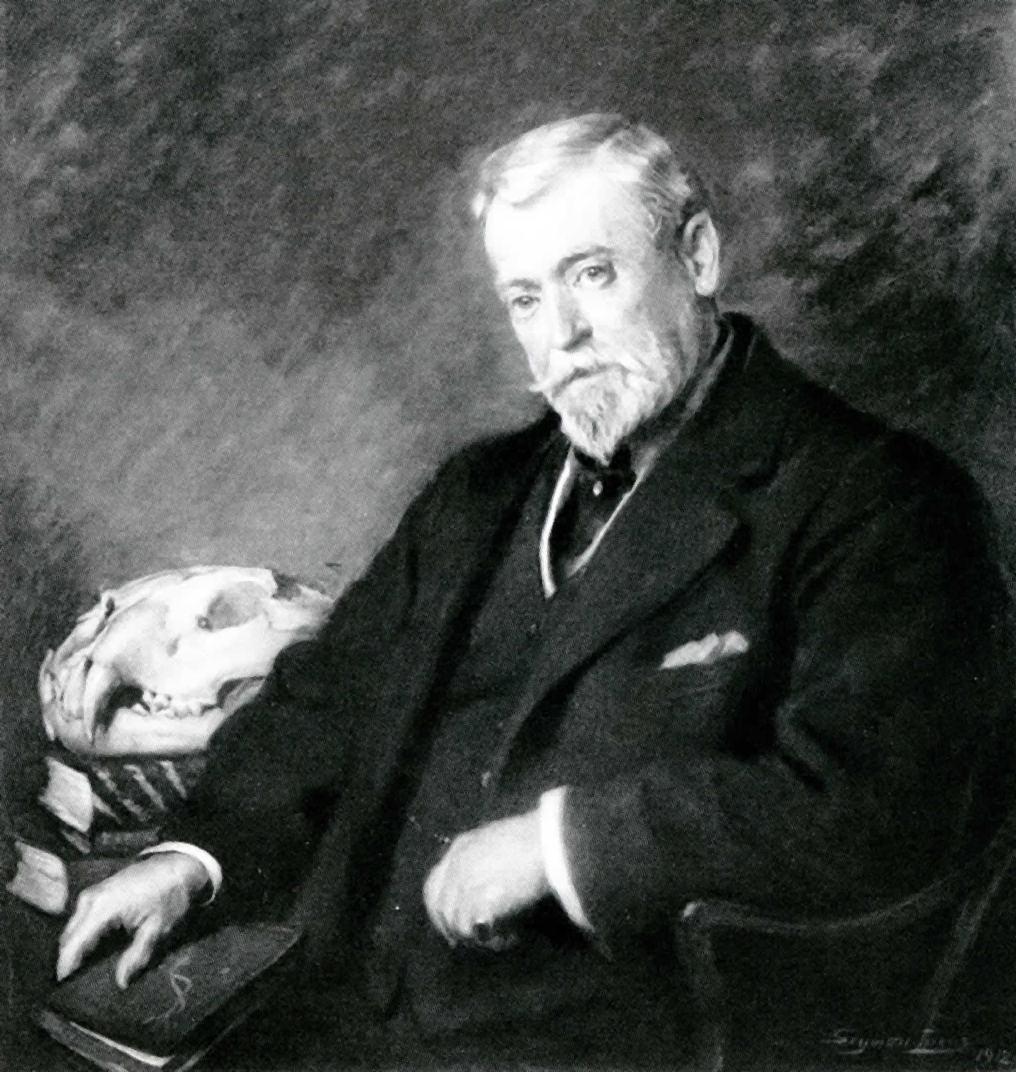
James Rowland Ward 1848–1912

James Rowland Ward (12 May 1848 – 28 December 1912) was a British taxidermist and founder of the firm Rowland Ward Limited of Piccadilly, London. The company specialised in and was renowned for its taxidermy work on birds and big-game trophies, but it did other types of work as well. In creating many practical items from antlers, feathers, feet, skins, and tusks, the Rowland Ward company made fashionable items (sometimes known as Wardian furniture) from animal parts, such as zebra-hoof inkwells, antler furniture, and elephant-feet umbrella stands.

Ward was also a well-known publisher of natural history books and big-game hunting narratives. Records of Big Game series of books, which started in 1892 and is now in its thirtieth edition (2020). These books contain measurements of game animals from all over the world and is the oldest such series of books in existence.

== History of Rowland Ward Limited ==
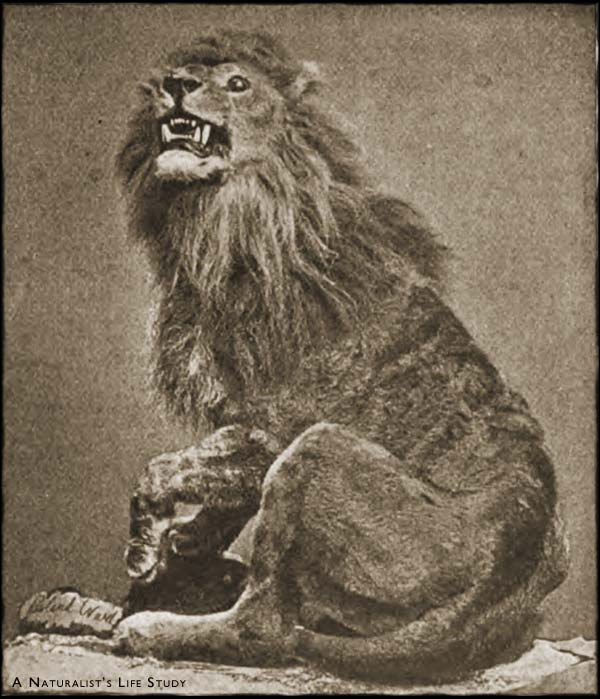
The 'Macarte Lion' that killed the lion-tamer Thomas Macarte in 1872 - mounted by Rowland Ward in 1874

Even before Rowland's time, his family had been involved in taxidermy and natural history. According to the history of the Rowland Ward company by P. A. Morris, Rowland Ward's grandfather was a naturalist and dealer in animal skins. Edwin Henry Ward (1812–1878), Rowland Ward's father, was a well-known taxidermist in his day. Edwin H. Ward travelled with John James Audubon on his expeditions, and Ward collected and prepared the bird skins for the artist. These specimens were later used by Audubon in his epic The Birds of America.

Edwin H. Ward worked for a while on Oxford Street for Thomas Mutlow Williams who exhibited at the Great Exhibition of 1851. He then set up his own taxidermy shop in 1857 and received a royal warrant from Queen Victoria in 1870. Other distantly related Ward family members had taxidermy-related businesses as far away as New York and Australia. Edwin H. Ward and his wife Emily, née Hunt had two sons, Edwin Jr. and James Rowland. Both were trained in their father's business and were successful on their own, mounting heads for the British royal family as well the empress of Austria, among others. Edwin Jr. left the taxidermy business and eventually moved to the United States where he was involved in various ventures. Edwin Jr.'s son, Herbert Ward (1863–1919), served as a zoologist for Henry Morton Stanley during Stanley's 1887–1888 Emin Pasha Relief Expedition into the interior of then-unknown Africa.

Rowland Ward became the best-known taxidermist of the family. In his own book, A Naturalist's Life Study he said he left school at age fourteen to work in his father's shop. Rowland helped his father mount a hummingbird collection for John Gould. Early on, his focus was on sculpting and anatomically correct modelling. Rowland Ward was also a bronze sculptor of note.

By 1870, all three Wards operated taxidermy shops of their own in England. Then Edwin Jr. left for the United States and Edwin H. Ward died in 1878, and these events left Rowland Ward the only family member in the taxidermy business in England. In the later part of the nineteenth century, Rowland Ward located his shop at 167 Piccadilly, London. From far and wide, in newspapers and in casual speech throughout the Empire, his shop was famously referred to as "The Jungle."

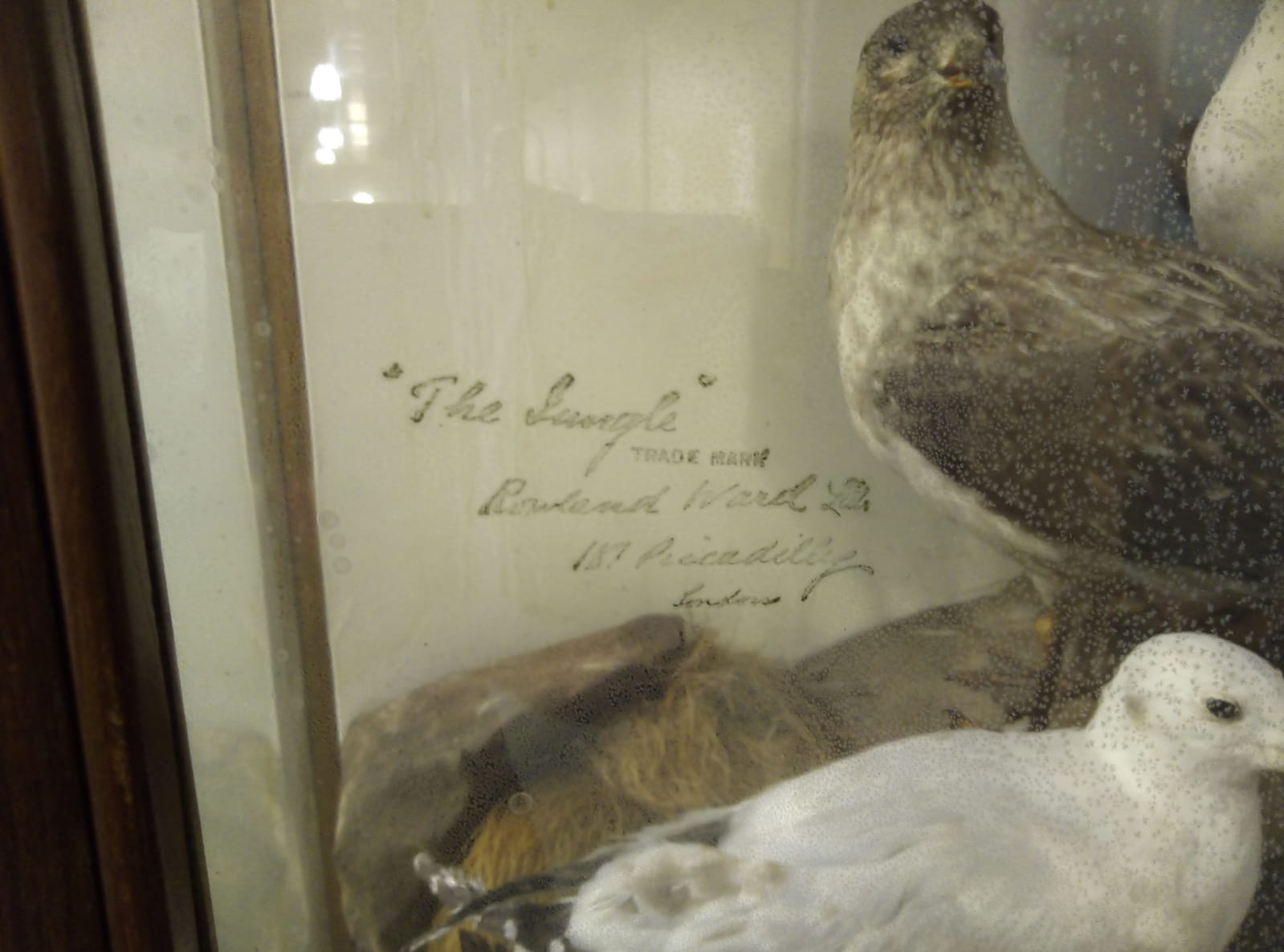
"The Jungle" detail from the Falkland Islands Bird Taxidermy Case at World Museum, National Museums Liverpool

== Rowland Ward in the Victorian Age ==
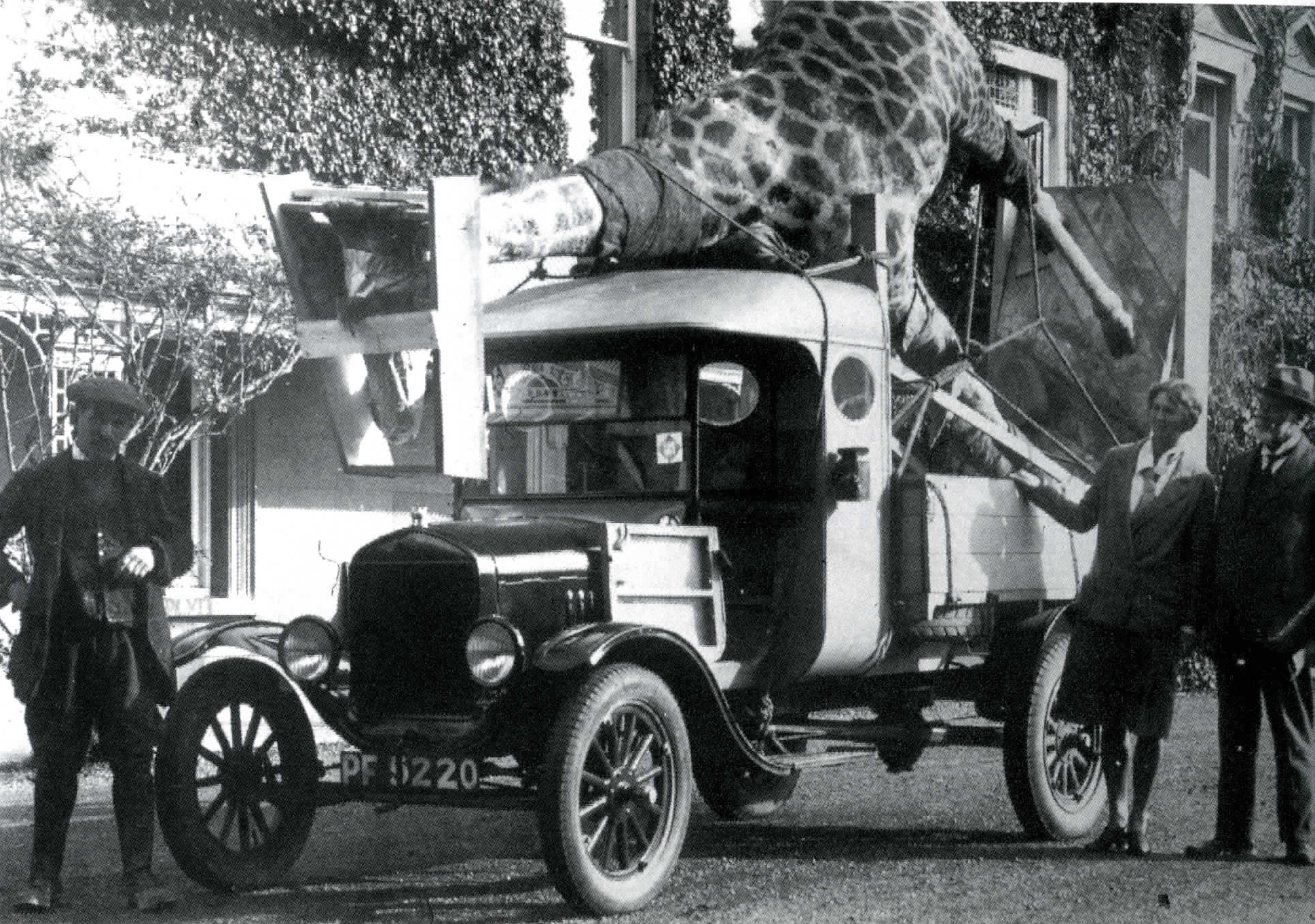
Transporting a giraffe to the Powell-Cotton Museum.

Two forces in the nineteenth century came together to make Rowland Ward Ltd. an international powerhouse of taxidermy and book publishing: the global reach of the British Empire and the Industrial Revolution. The British Empire was composed of dominions, colonies, protectorates, mandates, and other territories that were ruled or administered by the United Kingdom. At its height, the British Empire was the largest in history and, for over a century it was the foremost global power. Its apex occurred during the lifetime of James Rowland Ward. At the end of World War I, the British Empire held sway over about 458 million people, one-fifth of the world's population at the time. The Empire covered more than 33,700,000 km sq. (13,012,000 sq. miles), almost a quarter of the Earth's total land area . . . and Rowland Ward was not only known as the taxidermist to the Empire's rich and powerful, but Rowland Ward Ltd. was the only organisation to keep extensive records of the trophies of the Empire's elites as well as dignitaries from other nations.

The Industrial Revolution had created enormous new wealth, and that revolution started in Britain. The industries founded in Great Britain generated tremendous fortunes for the owners of the newly formed industries. These fortunes created a new class of British sportsmen who ventured out over the world and brought back hunting trophies as well as natural history specimens for public and private museums. Rowland Ward Ltd. thrived as a result. The company's reputation spread, and soon Rowland Ward was receiving commissions from all over Europe to prepare museum specimens. Famous sportsmen from as far away as Russia brought their trophies to Rowland Ward Ltd. In addition, Rowland Ward Ltd. helped many museums and private collections acquire specimens.

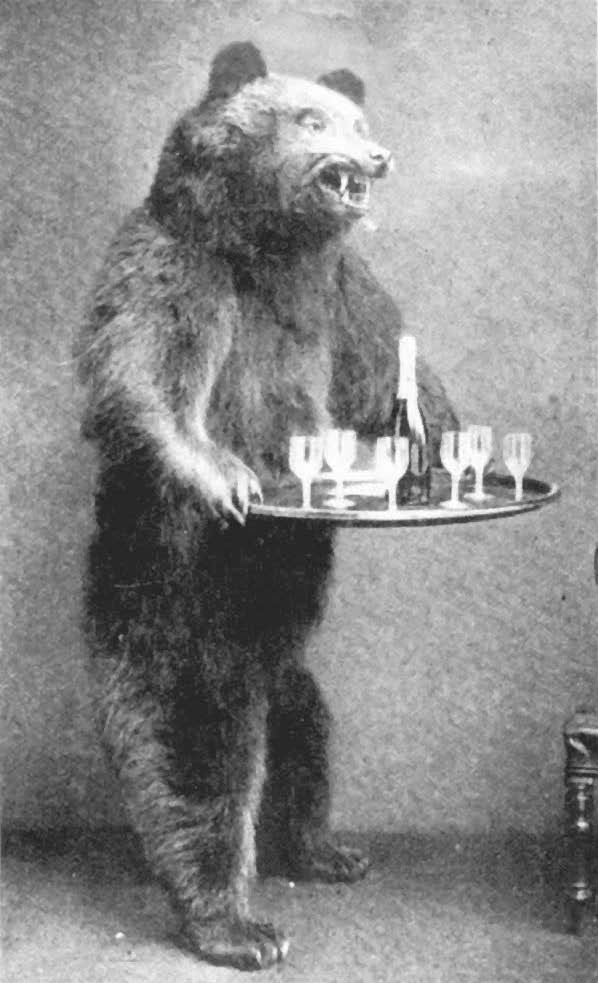
Bear "dumbwaiter" holding drinks for arriving guests.

Possibly among Ward's most famous work was the taxidermy he did for Percy Powell-Cotton for the famous Powell-Cotton Museum. Rowland Ward wanted to mount Powell-Cotton's elephant, which had the second largest tusks ever recorded, life-size, but to do so would necessitate an extension of the roof of the building to accommodate such a large trophy, and that was something Powell-Cotton did not want to do. Rowland Ward felt so strongly that this elephant should be life size that he made a deal with Powell-Cotton: Rowland Ward would do the taxidermy for free if Powell-Cotton would do the necessary remodelling to accommodate the full-size mount. They agreed, and the full-size mount can still be viewed today in the Powell-Cotton Museum at Quex Park.

More than any other taxidermist of his age, Rowland Ward became known for making items from skins, horns, and skulls that could be used in the home, either for practical purposes or as decorations. Known as Victorian or Edwardian "animal furniture", these items included a "dumbwaiter" in the form of a mounted bear standing up straight and holding a silver tray on which glasses could be placed; inkwells made from horse hoofs; and letter openers with the blade made from ivory, the handle made of a fox's paw, and the two connected with an elegant silver sleeve. Then there were liquor cabinets made from elephants' feet; stuffed birds that acted as lamp stands, and items that would seem very odd in the twenty-first century but were highly fashionable and desirable in Victorian England. In addition, Rowland Ward Ltd. was a great supplier of glass cabinets filled with colourful mounted birds; these were all the rage as home decorations at the time. Because rowing on the Thames was such a fashionable activity during Ward's lifetime, the company also sold canoes imported from Canada. It appears that Rowland Ward Ltd. made a great deal of money from his ventures. Rowland Ward's mounted heads and glass bird boxes are very collectible today in England, with several auction houses offering specialised sales each year.

== Rowland Ward Ltd. Publishing ==
In 1872 Rowland Ward's brother, Edwin Jr., published a small book entitled Knapsack Manual for Sportsmen on the Field. It is clear Rowland Ward borrowed elements from this publication to start his own series of books in 1880 called The Sportsman's Handbook. Today this series is in its fifteenth edition. These handbooks serve as guides on how to conduct hunts, take care of skins, operate camps, hire guides, and select firearms.

Soon other books followed, including the first edition of the Records of Big Game in 1892. Today, the early editions of Rowland Ward's record books and his other publications are highly sought after by collectors worldwide and bring very high prices in the antiquarian market. These titles include Sport in Somaliland by Count Josef Potocki, After Wild Sheep in the Altai and Mongolia by Prince Demidoff; Great and Small Game of Africa by Henry Bryden; The Deer of All Lands by Richard Lydekker; Elephant Hunting in East Equatorial Africa by Alfred Neumann; A Sporting Trip Through Abyssinia by Percy Powell-Cotton; Travel and Big Game by Frederick Selous, and many others. In addition to his own publishing ventures, Rowland Ward also distributed books for other companies.

Rowland Ward himself wrote several books, including one on his angling trip to Florida that was based on the diaries kept by his wife. The company's most prolific author was Richard Lydekker, who happened to be the preeminent naturalist of his time. Lydekker wrote a total of nine books for Rowland Ward.

Many of Rowland Ward's books are instantly recognisable by their "zebra pattern" endpapers, which were granted a patent in Great Britain. The company issued some books in small-number, limited editions signed by Rowland Ward himself. Even the books not signed or limited are now very rare and costly, especially in what book dealers term "fine" condition.

== Records of Big Game ==
The most enduring and famous of all Rowland Ward's publications is his Records of Big Game. Started in 1882, the first edition was entitled Horn Measurements and Weights of the Great Game of the World. It was revised and reprinted in 1894, but the second edition, which was published only four years after the first, had two-and-a-half times the number of pages as the first. The second edition was entitled Rowland Ward's Records of Big Game, and it is this title that has been used ever since.

Rowland Wards Records of Big Game 7th Edn

The series was the talk of its day among hunters and naturalists, and by the time World War I started (1914), seven editions had been issued, each containing more and more measurements and greater variations in the number and species of animals with trophies listed from the early 1800s. In this period, field guides were not published; consequently, the Records of Big Game served as a valuable resource for information as to what mammals could be found and where they could be found in the far-flung corners of the earth and Empire.

Many natural history museums of that day kept a copy of Rowland Ward's Records of Big Game in their reference libraries. Not only were there measurements, but the volumes in the series also contained anecdotes from hunters, naturalists, and Rowland Ward himself about species, subspecies, geographical variations, common weights and measurements, and distribution. As a testament of Rowland Ward's own naturalist qualifications, three animals had the Ward name incorporated in their scientific nomenclature: the Asiatic ibex, Capra sibirica wardi; a subspecies of reedbuck, Redunca redunca wardi; and a subspecies of the Malayan bear, Ursus malayanus wardi.

As time went by, Rowland Ward's Records of Big Game became a who's who of big-game hunting. Those who entered their trophies in "the book", as it was called, included King George V, Queen Elizabeth II, Prince Bernhard of the Netherlands, Prince Abdorreza of Iran, various Princes of Wales, the Maharaja of Cooch Behar, Sir Winston Churchill, President Theodore Roosevelt, Lord Curzon, and a host of other royalty, nobility, dignitaries, celebrities, and otherwise famous people. After World War II, the influence of American big-game hunters became more apparent as sportsmen such as Ernest Hemingway, Robert Ruark, Jack O’Connor, Herb Klein, Elgin Gates, and James Mellon II entered their exceptional game trophies in "the book".

== Death and succession ==
At the turn of the twentieth century, Rowland Ward Ltd. was at its zenith, and in 1904 the company was granted a royal warrant. Hunters and naturalists from all over the world came to Rowland Ward for advice on equipment and destinations. In 1907 American Percy Madeira wrote "When in 1907 I saw the possibility of making this hunting trip—a long desired wish—I wrote to Rowland Ward, the naturalist-taxidermist, in London, inquiring where the best bag of African game had been secured that year". Madeira proceeded to take a steamer to London where he picked up supplies deemed necessary for an extended safari before continuing on to East Africa.

Young Winston Churchill was a customer of Rowland Ward Ltd. Walter Rothschild, kings Edward VII and George V, and numerous American and European celebrities and film stars brought their hunting trophies to "The Jungle" to be mounted. While there they bought various curios and animal furniture, all of which garner very high prices at auction houses today. Rowland Ward was married to Lina Maple Ward (1868–1951), but the couple had no children. Lina was apparently not involved in the business, and she is rarely mentioned by Ward in his writings. In his book on his Florida fishing trip he refers to her as "Mrs. Ward." The couple appears to have had a high standard of living, keeping staff and a butler in their London home. When Rowland Ward died on 28 December 1912, there was no one to succeed him.

The company issued shares and was incorporated under the name Rowland Ward Limited in 1891. There were several shareholders, but it appears Rowland Ward was the majority shareholder. By the time of Rowland Ward's death, however, John Binmore Burlace was the company manager as well as a shareholder. Burlace continued acquiring shares over time and by the late 1920s he held the majority. He bought out Lina Ward entirely in 1935.

By the mid-1930s, the publishing side of the business had slowed down considerably with only Records of Big Game continuing on a steady basis; however, the taxidermy part of the business and the retail establishment in London were going strong. By the early 1940s, Burlace retired and sold his shares to Gerald Best, who bought the last shares from the remaining shareholders in 1946.

== After World War II ==
Already after World War I, great changes began to occur in the world of taxidermy and international hunting. Whereas before 1914 most of the sportsmen seen in the game fields of the world were British, after 1918 they were gradually replaced by American hunters, and after World War II, more American hunters were seen in Africa and Asia than any other nationality. At the same time American taxidermists such as Louis Paul Jonas of Denver, the James Clark Studios, and later Klineburger Brothers Taxidermy started providing taxidermy services to their clientele in the United States. Nonetheless, Rowland Ward Ltd. retained a prominent position in the world of taxidermy, and during the Gerald Best years up to 80 percent of all taxidermy work was exported.

In 1950, Rowland Ward Ltd. opened an establishment in Nairobi for taxidermy and as a center for processing and shipping raw skins. In England, the business continued in various locations in London, and in the period between 1960 and 1970 Rowland Ward Ltd. employed from twenty-nine to forty-four people, . When Gerald Best died on 17 October 1969, the taxidermy part of the business was taken over by Anthony Arthur Best, his son.

However, the times were changing and the continued loss of habitat for the world's great mammals had its effect on hunting. Various locales and entire countries closed their hunting programs, including India in 1971 and Kenya in 1976. In 1974 the government of Kenya expropriated the Nairobi Rowland Ward establishment without compensation, a great loss for the company. This, combined with the shifting of the client base to the United States and the increasing competition from American and European companies, caused the taxidermy side of the business to close in the mid-1970s.

== Retail Establishment in London ==
Tim Best, a brother of Anthony, continued to operate the Rowland Ward store, now located in Knightsbridge, London, which sold crystal, porcelain, books, and other animal-themed items. He also published books containing accounts of big-game hunting adventures, including Tony Sanchez's on the Trail of the African Elephant. In addition, Tim Best was in charge of the record book series; in 1981 he published the eighteenth edition of Records of Big Game.

== Ownership Moves to the United States and then to South Africa ==
The eighteenth edition of Records of Big Game was, however, the last edition to be published in England. In 1982 the company was sold to Game Conservation International (known as Game Coin), an organisation based in San Antonio, Texas. Game Coin published one edition of the Records of Big Game and then turned over the publishing of the series to Steve Smith of Johannesburg, South Africa.

Steve Smith greatly revitalised the publishing program and started publishing maps, more hunting narratives, and natural history books as well as the perennial best-seller Records of Big Game. Smith also once again began accepting game entries from Asia, Europe, and North America. (Only African game had been accepted since the tenth edition of Records of Big Game (1935).)

A year after Smith died in a car accident (1993), Game Coin sold the company to Robin Halse of Queenstown, South Africa. Subsequently, the company was taken over by his daughter, Jane Halse, who continues to publish the Records of Big Game series as well as other natural history and hunting publications. Since the Halse family took over the business, Rowland Ward has continued to remain active in publishing and has also branched out in other areas as well. Besides publishing and selling books, Rowland Ward also sells clothing and leather goods. Its retail establishment in Johannesburg sells its products all over the world via its Web site and catalogs. Safari Press of Huntington Beach, California, distributes the company's publications in North America. In 2015 the company was sold and operations are now based in California.
