= Listed buildings in Thanet District, Kent =

There are about 1,050 Listed Buildings in the Thanet District of Kent, which are buildings of architectural or historic interest.

- Grade I buildings are of exceptional interest.
- Grade II* buildings are particularly important buildings of more than special interest.
- Grade II buildings are of special interest.

The lists follow Historic England’s geographical organisation, with entries grouped by county, local authority, and parish (civil and non-civil). The following lists are arranged by parish.

Parish	Listed buildings list	Grade I	Grade II*	Grade II	Total
Acol	Listed buildings in Acol			5	5
Birchington-on-Sea	Listed buildings in Birchington-on-Sea		1	37	38
Broadstairs and St Peters	Listed buildings in Broadstairs and St Peters		1	139	140
Cliffsend	Listed buildings in Cliffsend			2	2
Margate (non-civil parish)	Listed buildings in Margate	2	10	254	266
Martson	Listed buildings in Manston, Kent			9	9
Minster-in-Thanet	Listed buildings in Minster-in-Thanet	2	1	46	49
Monkton	Listed buildings in Monkton, Kent	1	2	19	22
Ramsgate	Listed buildings in Ramsgate	5	12	432	449
Sarre	Listed buildings in Sarre, Kent			19	19
St Nicholas-at-Wade	Listed buildings in St Nicholas-at-Wade	1	2	35	38
Westgate-on-Sea	Listed buildings in Westgate-on-Sea			14	14
Total	—	14	29	1,010	1,053
