= Listed buildings in Margate =

Historic structures in Kent, England

Margate is a town and non-civil parish in the Thanet District of Kent, England.. It contains two grade I, ten II*, 254 grade II listed buildings that are recorded in the National Heritage List for England.

This list is based on the information retrieved online from Historic England

== Key ==
Grade	Criteria
I	Buildings that are of exceptional interest
II*	Particularly important buildings of more than special interest
II	Buildings that are of special interest

== Listing ==
Name	Grade	Location	Type	Completed (Note: The date given is the date used by Historic England as significant for the initial building or that of an important part in the structure's description.)	Date designated	Grid ref. (Note: The grid reference is based on the British national grid reference system, sometimes known as OSGB36, used by the Ordnance Survey.) Geo-coordinates	Notes	Entry number (Note: The "List Entry Number" is a unique number assigned to each listed building and scheduled monument by Historic England.)	Image	Wikidata
1-7, Addington Square	II	1-7, Addington Square			2 January 1970	TR3563370740; 51°23′12″N 1°23′07″E		1355033	Upload Photo	Q26637837
Theatre Royal	II*	Addington Street			25 August 1955	TR3558770766; 51°23′13″N 1°23′05″E		1341519	Upload Photo	Q17546707
1, Addington Street	II	1, Addington Street			22 February 1973	TR3553570617; 51°23′08″N 1°23′01″E		1089015	Upload Photo	Q26381433
3, Addington Street	II	3, Addington Street			22 February 1973	TR3553670624; 51°23′09″N 1°23′02″E		1089016	Upload Photo	Q26381434
Arlington House	II	5, Addington Street			22 February 1973	TR3553870630; 51°23′09″N 1°23′02″E		1281771	Upload Photo	Q26570786
7, Addington Street	II	7, Addington Street			22 February 1973	TR3554170639; 51°23′09″N 1°23′02″E		1341518	Upload Photo	Q26625605
9 and 11, Addington Street	II	9 and 11, Addington Street			22 February 1973	TR3554670645; 51°23′09″N 1°23′02″E		1281780	Upload Photo	Q26570795
13, Addington Street	II	13, Addington Street			22 February 1973	TR3555470662; 51°23′10″N 1°23′03″E		1089017	Upload Photo	Q26381435
14-18, Addington Street	II	14-18, Addington Street			22 February 1973	TR3561970750; 51°23′13″N 1°23′06″E		1089018	Upload Photo	Q26381436
Lochaber House	II	39, Addington Street			22 February 1973	TR3560970785; 51°23′14″N 1°23′06″E		1203266	Upload Photo	Q26498817
Albert House	II	3 and 4, Albert Terrace			22 February 1973	TR3525070871; 51°23′17″N 1°22′47″E		1203269	Upload Photo	Q26678887
5, Albert Terrace	II	5, Albert Terrace			22 February 1973	TR3525870865; 51°23′17″N 1°22′48″E		1088976	Upload Photo	Q26381393
6, Albert Terrace	II	6, Albert Terrace			22 February 1973	TR3525970860; 51°23′17″N 1°22′48″E		1341540	Upload Photo	Q26625623
7, Albert Terrace	II	7, Albert Terrace			22 February 1973	TR3526470856; 51°23′17″N 1°22′48″E		1088977	Upload Photo	Q26381394
8-10, Albert Terrace	II	8-10, Albert Terrace			22 February 1973	TR3526870844; 51°23′16″N 1°22′48″E		1341501	Upload Photo	Q26625588
11 and 12, Albert Terrace	II	11 and 12, Albert Terrace			22 February 1973	TR3526170831; 51°23′16″N 1°22′48″E		1088978	Upload Photo	Q26381395
13, Albert Terrace	II	13, Albert Terrace			22 February 1973	TR3525470825; 51°23′16″N 1°22′47″E		1088979	Upload Photo	Q26381397
14 and 15, Albert Terrace	II	14 and 15, Albert Terrace			22 February 1973	TR3525870818; 51°23′15″N 1°22′48″E		1341502	Upload Photo	Q26625589
16, Albert Terrace	II	16, Albert Terrace			22 February 1973	TR3526370812; 51°23′15″N 1°22′48″E		1088980	Upload Photo	Q26381398
17, 18, 19 and 19a, Albert Terrace	II	17, 18, 19 and 19a, Albert Terrace			22 February 1973	TR3526670800; 51°23′15″N 1°22′48″E		1341503	Upload Photo	Q26625590
1 and 2, Albion Place	II	1 and 2, Albion Place			22 February 1973	TR3559671248; 51°23′29″N 1°23′06″E		1088981	Upload Photo	Q26381399
1 -27, Alexandra Homes	II	1 -27, Alexandra Homes, Tivoli Road, CT9 5SG			22 February 1973	TR3536170073; 51°22′51″N 1°22′51″E		1094685	Upload Photo	Q26387013
The Scenic Railway at Dreamland	II*	Belgrave Road			1 March 2002	TR3510870540; 51°23′07″N 1°22′39″E		1359602	Upload Photo	Q2229130
1 and 3, Broad Street	II	1 and 3, Broad Street			22 February 1973	TR3538771061; 51°23′23″N 1°22′55″E		1341504	Upload Photo	Q26625591
2, Broad Street	II	2, Broad Street			22 February 1973	TR3541271062; 51°23′23″N 1°22′56″E		1088983	Upload Photo	Q26381401
6 and 8, Broad Street	II	6 and 8, Broad Street			22 February 1973	TR3541071077; 51°23′24″N 1°22′56″E		1281756	Upload Photo	Q26570771
10, Broad Street	II	10, Broad Street			22 February 1973	TR3541271084; 51°23′24″N 1°22′56″E		1341505	Upload Photo	Q26625592
11, Broad Street	II	11, Broad Street			22 February 1973	TR3539571082; 51°23′24″N 1°22′55″E		1088982	Upload Photo	Q26381400
1-13, Buenos Ayres	II	1-13, Buenos Ayres			22 July 1973	TR3475070657; 51°23′11″N 1°22′21″E		1088984	Upload Photo	Q26381402
Chapel of Royal Sea Bathing Hospital	II	Canterbury Road			23 October 1990	TR3433270456; 51°23′05″N 1°21′59″E		1241852	Upload Photo	Q26534700
Church of St James	II	Canterbury Road, Westgate-on-sea, CT9 5JU			13 February 2023	TR3330469875; 51°22′48″N 1°21′04″E		1481930	Upload Photo	Q122214046
Royal Sea Bathing Hospital	II	Canterbury Road			22 February 1973	TR3431070520; 51°23′07″N 1°21′58″E		1088987	Upload Photo	Q26381405
Royal Sea Bathing Hospital Mortuary	II	Canterbury Road			9 December 1998	TR3433370439; 51°23′05″N 1°21′59″E		1033363	Upload Photo	Q26284846
Statue of Erasmus Wilson to South of Royal Sea Bathing Hospital	II	Canterbury Road			23 October 1990	TR3436970491; 51°23′06″N 1°22′01″E		1260303	Upload Photo	Q26551333
Westgate and Garlinge War Memorial	II	Outside The Church Of St James, Canterbury Road, CT9 5JU			26 February 2018	TR3329769874; 51°22′48″N 1°21′04″E		1452803	Upload Photo	Q66479333
229, Canterbury Road	II	229, Canterbury Road			7 May 1976	TR3348069850; 51°22′47″N 1°21′14″E		1241719	Upload Photo	Q26534580
231, Canterbury Road	II	231, Canterbury Road			7 May 1976	TR3347469857; 51°22′47″N 1°21′13″E		1241724	Upload Photo	Q26534584
7-12, Caroline Square	II	7-12, Caroline Square			22 February 1973	TR3589171061; 51°23′22″N 1°23′21″E		1088989	Upload Photo	Q26381407
Margate General Post Office	II	Cecil Square			8 January 1988	TR3545770854; 51°23′16″N 1°22′58″E		1241810	Upload Photo	Q26534663
1, Cecil Square	II	1, Cecil Square			22 February 1973	TR3541770883; 51°23′17″N 1°22′56″E		1203403	Upload Photo	Q26498940
2, Cecil Square	II	2, Cecil Square			7 May 1996	TR3540870884; 51°23′17″N 1°22′56″E		1268469	Upload Photo	Q26558776
3 and 5, Cecil Square	II	3 and 5, Cecil Square			22 February 1973	TR3538470882; 51°23′17″N 1°22′54″E		1088990	Upload Photo	Q26381408
6-12, Cecil Square	II	6-12, Cecil Square			10 April 1951	TR3535870880; 51°23′17″N 1°22′53″E		1088991	Upload Photo	Q26381409
13, Cecil Square	II	13, Cecil Square			22 February 1973	TR3534270854; 51°23′16″N 1°22′52″E		1203407	Upload Photo	Q26498944
14 and 15, Cecil Square	II	14 and 15, Cecil Square			22 February 1973	TR3534370834; 51°23′16″N 1°22′52″E		1088992	Upload Photo	Q26381410
24, Cecil Square	II	24, Cecil Square			22 February 1976	TR3546070868; 51°23′17″N 1°22′58″E		1203413	Upload Photo	Q26498950
25, Cecil Square	II	25, Cecil Square			22 February 1973	TR3546170876; 51°23′17″N 1°22′58″E		1088993	Upload Photo	Q26381411
1, Cecil Street	II	1, Cecil Street			22 February 1973	TR3546170823; 51°23′15″N 1°22′58″E		1088994	Upload Photo	Q26381412
2, Cecil Street	II	2, Cecil Street			22 February 1973	TR3546070816; 51°23′15″N 1°22′58″E		1203418	Upload Photo	Q26498955
5, Cecil Street	II	5, Cecil Street			22 February 1973	TR3545970798; 51°23′14″N 1°22′58″E		1088995	Upload Photo	Q26381413
6, Cecil Street	II	6, Cecil Street			22 February 1973	TR3545970792; 51°23′14″N 1°22′58″E		1341508	Upload Photo	Q26625595
3, Charlotte Square	II	3, Charlotte Square			22 February 1973	TR3554370528; 51°23′06″N 1°23′02″E		1281699	Upload Photo	Q26570719
7, Charlotte Square	II	7, Charlotte Square			22 February 1973	TR3554870526; 51°23′06″N 1°23′02″E		1088996	Upload Photo	Q26381414
9, Charlotte Square	II	9, Charlotte Square			22 February 1973	TR3555370524; 51°23′05″N 1°23′02″E		1281702	Upload Photo	Q26570721
11, Charlotte Square	II	11, Charlotte Square			22 February 1973	TR3555870522; 51°23′05″N 1°23′02″E		1341509	Upload Photo	Q26625596
15, Charlotte Square	II	15, Charlotte Square			22 February 1973	TR3556370519; 51°23′05″N 1°23′03″E		1088997	Upload Photo	Q26381415
24 and 26, Charlotte Square	II	24 and 26, Charlotte Square			22 February 1973	TR3556770479; 51°23′04″N 1°23′03″E		1203430	Upload Photo	Q26498966
George and Dragon Public House	II	28 and 30, Charlotte Square			22 February 1973	TR3557270471; 51°23′04″N 1°23′03″E		1088998	Upload Photo	Q26381416
Albert House	II	32, Charlotte Square			22 February 1973	TR3558870475; 51°23′04″N 1°23′04″E		1088953	Upload Photo	Q26381370
Gordon House	II	10, Churchfield Place			20 July 1972	TR3549070648; 51°23′10″N 1°22′59″E		1088954	Upload Photo	Q26381371
14 & 15, Cliff Terrace	II	14 & 15, Cliff Terrace			15 October 2007	TR3591271341; 51°23′31″N 1°23′23″E		1392274	Upload Photo	Q26671503
Clifton Arms Public House	II	25, Clifton Street			22 February 1973	TR3585471030; 51°23′21″N 1°23′19″E		1341530	Upload Photo	Q26625615
Walpole Bay Tidal Pool	II	Cliftonville, CT9 3AB			25 September 2014	TR3692671494; 51°23′35″N 1°24′15″E		1421296	Upload Photo	Q26676852
Fountain	II	Dane Park			22 February 1973	TR3604470666; 51°23′09″N 1°23′28″E		1088955	Upload Photo	Q26381372
Dent De Lion Gateway	II*	Dent De Lion Road, Garlinge			10 April 1951	TR3321669627; 51°22′40″N 1°20′59″E		1341531	Upload Photo	Q17546710
Wellington Hotel	II	Duke Street			22 February 1973	TR3536571042; 51°23′22″N 1°22′54″E		1088956	Upload Photo	Q26381373
2, Duke Street	II	2, Duke Street			22 February 1973	TR3538171059; 51°23′23″N 1°22′55″E		1088957	Upload Photo	Q26381374
4, Duke Street	II	4, Duke Street			22 February 1973	TR3537171060; 51°23′23″N 1°22′54″E		1341532	Upload Photo	Q26625616
6 and 8, Duke Street	II	6 and 8, Duke Street			22 February 1973	TR3536171061; 51°23′23″N 1°22′54″E		1254722	Upload Photo	Q26546368
10, Duke Street	II	10, Duke Street			22 February 1973	TR3535371065; 51°23′23″N 1°22′53″E		1088958	Upload Photo	Q26381375
Remains of the Clifton Baths at Cliftonville Lido	II	Ethelbert Terrace			1 September 2008	TR3592971372; 51°23′32″N 1°23′24″E		1392729	Upload Photo	Q26671937
Winter Gardens	II	Fort Crescent			28 July 2008	TR3568771342; 51°23′32″N 1°23′11″E		1392676	Upload Photo	Q33025343
1-8, Fort Crescent	II	1-8, Fort Crescent			22 February 1973	TR3558071281; 51°23′30″N 1°23′05″E		1341533	Upload Photo	Q26625617
12-32, Fort Crescent	II	12-32, Fort Crescent			22 February 1973	TR3568471265; 51°23′29″N 1°23′11″E		1088959	Upload Photo	Q26381376
33-36, Fort Crescent	II	33-36, Fort Crescent			10 April 1951	TR3577071278; 51°23′29″N 1°23′15″E		1088960	Upload Photo	Q26381377
Britannia Hotel Public House	II	Fort Hill			22 February 1973	TR3555971265; 51°23′29″N 1°23′04″E		1281659	Upload Photo	Q26570684
Royal Albion Hotel	II	2, Fort Hill			22 February 1973	TR3536771135; 51°23′25″N 1°22′54″E		1203496	Upload Photo	Q26499026
6 and 8, Fort Hill	II	6 and 8, Fort Hill			22 February 1973	TR3538271132; 51°23′25″N 1°22′55″E		1341534	Upload Photo	Q26625618
32, Fort Hill	II	32, Fort Hill			22 February 1973	TR3541871190; 51°23′27″N 1°22′57″E		1088961	Upload Photo	Q26381378
1, Fort Mount	II	1, Fort Mount			22 February 1973	TR3547671199; 51°23′27″N 1°23′00″E		1341535	Upload Photo	Q26625619
Mount Villa	II	2, Fort Mount			22 February 1973	TR3547971203; 51°23′28″N 1°23′00″E		1281662	Upload Photo	Q26570686
2 and 3, Fort Paragon	II	2 and 3, Fort Paragon			22 February 1973	TR3581971348; 51°23′32″N 1°23′18″E		1088962	Upload Photo	Q26381379
48-54, Grosvenor Place	II	48-54, Grosvenor Place			22 February 1973	TR3534270625; 51°23′09″N 1°22′52″E		1341536	Upload Photo	Q26625620
56-62, Grosvenor Place	II	56-62, Grosvenor Place			22 February 1973	TR3534870604; 51°23′08″N 1°22′52″E		1203569	Upload Photo	Q26499090
64, Grosvenor Place	II	64, Grosvenor Place			22 February 1973	TR3535470586; 51°23′08″N 1°22′52″E		1088963	Upload Photo	Q26381380
106-116, Grosvenor Place	II	106-116, Grosvenor Place			22 February 1973	TR3538570444; 51°23′03″N 1°22′53″E		1281618	Upload Photo	Q26570650
118-128, Grosvenor Place	II	118-128, Grosvenor Place			22 February 1973	TR3539370409; 51°23′02″N 1°22′54″E		1088964	Upload Photo	Q26381381
The Grotto	I	Grotto Hill			22 February 1973	TR3593270870; 51°23′16″N 1°23′23″E		1341537	Upload Photo	Q7493665
Church of All Saints	II	Hartsdown Road			22 February 1973	TR3444670293; 51°23′00″N 1°22′04″E		1281623	Upload Photo	Q26570654
9, Hartsdown Road	II	9, Hartsdown Road			22 February 1973	TR3446670253; 51°22′58″N 1°22′05″E		1088965	Upload Photo	Q26381382
Former Methodist Chapel	II	Hawley Square			22 February 1973	TR3552670770; 51°23′13″N 1°23′01″E		1203608	Upload Photo	Q26499127
Former Holy Trinity Hall	II	Hawley Square			22 February 1973	TR3549970767; 51°23′13″N 1°23′00″E		1088967	Upload Photo	Q26381384
Kent Adult Education Service	II	Margate Centre 1-3, Hawley Square, CT9 1PF			10 July 2018	TR3546570773; 51°23′14″N 1°22′58″E		1436170	Upload Photo	Q66477694
4, Hawley Square	II	4, Hawley Square			22 February 1973	TR3548270770; 51°23′14″N 1°22′59″E		1203603	Upload Photo	Q26499122
5 and 6, Hawley Square	II	5 and 6, Hawley Square			22 February 1973	TR3549170768; 51°23′13″N 1°23′00″E		1088966	Upload Photo	Q26381383
12, Hawley Square	II	12, Hawley Square			22 February 1973	TR3554070767; 51°23′13″N 1°23′02″E		1088968	Upload Photo	Q26381385
13, Hawley Square	II	13, Hawley Square			22 February 1973	TR3554470766; 51°23′13″N 1°23′02″E		1088969	Upload Photo	Q26381386
14, Hawley Square	II	14, Hawley Square			22 February 1973	TR3555270765; 51°23′13″N 1°23′03″E		1203611	Upload Photo	Q26499130
15 and 16, Hawley Square	II	15 and 16, Hawley Square			22 February 1973	TR3556070766; 51°23′13″N 1°23′03″E		1088970	Upload Photo	Q26381387
16a, Hawley Square	II	16a, Hawley Square			22 February 1973	TR3557170765; 51°23′13″N 1°23′04″E		1203618	Upload Photo	Q26499137
19, Hawley Square	II	19, Hawley Square			22 February 1973	TR3557770743; 51°23′12″N 1°23′04″E		1088971	Upload Photo	Q26381388
20 and 21, Hawley Square	II	20 and 21, Hawley Square			22 February 1973	TR3556670719; 51°23′12″N 1°23′03″E		1088972	Upload Photo	Q26381389
22 and 23, Hawley Square	II	22 and 23, Hawley Square			22 February 1973	TR3556270708; 51°23′11″N 1°23′03″E		1203628	Upload Photo	Q26499147
24, Hawley Square	II	24, Hawley Square			22 February 1973	TR3556170699; 51°23′11″N 1°23′03″E		1088973	Upload Photo	Q26381390
26 and 27, Hawley Square	II	26 and 27, Hawley Square			22 February 1973	TR3555670685; 51°23′11″N 1°23′03″E		1281605	Upload Photo	Q26570638
28-37, Hawley Square	II	28-37, Hawley Square			22 February 1973	TR3552570668; 51°23′10″N 1°23′01″E		1341538	Upload Photo	Q26625621
38, Hawley Square	II	38, Hawley Square			22 February 1973	TR3548670670; 51°23′10″N 1°22′59″E		1088974	Upload Photo	Q26381391
39, Hawley Square	II	39, Hawley Square			22 February 1973	TR3545170663; 51°23′10″N 1°22′57″E		1203652	Upload Photo	Q26499170
40, Hawley Square	II	40, Hawley Square			22 February 1973	TR3544370669; 51°23′10″N 1°22′57″E		1341539	Upload Photo	Q26625622
41, Hawley Square	II	41, Hawley Square			10 April 1951	TR3544470681; 51°23′11″N 1°22′57″E		1088975	Upload Photo	Q26381392
43 and 44, Hawley Square	II	43 and 44, Hawley Square			22 February 1973	TR3543870695; 51°23′11″N 1°22′57″E		1351099	Upload Photo	Q26634239
45 and 46, Hawley Square	II	45 and 46, Hawley Square			10 April 1951	TR3543770707; 51°23′12″N 1°22′57″E		1094629	Upload Photo	Q26386957
51, Hawley Square	II	51, Hawley Square			10 April 1951	TR3543070738; 51°23′13″N 1°22′56″E		1094631	Upload Photo	Q26386958
2, Hawley Street	II	2, Hawley Street			22 February 1973	TR3546070883; 51°23′17″N 1°22′58″E		1094633	Upload Photo	Q26386960
4, Hawley Street	II	4, Hawley Street			22 February 1973	TR3546070891; 51°23′17″N 1°22′58″E		1351102	Upload Photo	Q26634240
India House	II*	12, Hawley Street			10 April 1951	TR3543270926; 51°23′19″N 1°22′57″E		1351101	Upload Photo	Q17546729
The Limes	II	13, Hawley Street			22 February 1973	TR3543970941; 51°23′19″N 1°22′57″E		1094632	Upload Photo	Q26386959
Cinema De Luxe	II	High Street			5 October 2000	TR3537870612; 51°23′09″N 1°22′53″E		1385020	Upload Photo	Q26664828
Parish Church of St John the Baptist	I	High Street			10 April 1951	TR3554370400; 51°23′01″N 1°23′01″E		1351103	Upload Photo	Q17530207
1, High Street	II	1, High Street			22 February 1973	TR3529071018; 51°23′22″N 1°22′50″E		1094635	Upload Photo	Q26386962
5, High Street	II	5, High Street			22 February 1973	TR3528671005; 51°23′21″N 1°22′50″E		1094636	Upload Photo	Q26386963
17, High Street	II	17, High Street			22 February 1973	TR3527970974; 51°23′20″N 1°22′49″E		1203716	Upload Photo	Q26499231
19 and 21, High Street	II	19 and 21, High Street			22 February 1973	TR3527670961; 51°23′20″N 1°22′49″E		1351104	Upload Photo	Q26634241
23 and 25, High Street	II	23 and 25, High Street			22 February 1973	TR3527770951; 51°23′20″N 1°22′49″E		1094637	Upload Photo	Q26386964
44, High Street	II	44, High Street			22 February 1973	TR3524870921; 51°23′19″N 1°22′47″E		1281563	Upload Photo	Q26570598
64 and 66, High Street	II	64 and 66, High Street			22 February 1973	TR3528170848; 51°23′16″N 1°22′49″E		1351106	Upload Photo	Q26634243
80, High Street	II	80, High Street			22 February 1973	TR3530370814; 51°23′15″N 1°22′50″E		1203718	Upload Photo	Q26499233
82, High Street	II	82, High Street			22 February 1973	TR3530570805; 51°23′15″N 1°22′50″E		1094639	Upload Photo	Q26386966
99, High Street	II	99, High Street			22 February 1973	TR3536170715; 51°23′12″N 1°22′53″E		1281562	Upload Photo	Q26570597
101, High Street	II	101, High Street			22 February 1973	TR3536170712; 51°23′12″N 1°22′53″E		1351105	Upload Photo	Q26634242
103-109, High Street	II	103-109, High Street			22 February 1973	TR3536670701; 51°23′11″N 1°22′53″E		1094638	Upload Photo	Q26386965
Former Masonic Hall	II	166-168, High Street CT9 1LA			22 February 1973	TR3541570511; 51°23′05″N 1°22′55″E		1094640	Upload Photo	Q26386967
Former 'Man of Kent' Temperance Hotel	II	186-188, High Street			5 November 2010	TR3544170445; 51°23′03″N 1°22′56″E		1395803	Upload Photo	Q26674639
Grapevine Cottage	II	45, Holly Lane			22 February 1973	TR3743070570; 51°23′04″N 1°24′39″E		1203719	Upload Photo	Q26499234
12, King Street	II	12, King Street			22 February 1973	TR3539871088; 51°23′24″N 1°22′56″E		1281568	Upload Photo	Q26570603
12b and 14, King Street	II	12b and 14, King Street			22 February 1973	TR3542271087; 51°23′24″N 1°22′57″E		1351069	Upload Photo	Q26634210
15-19, King Street	II	15-19, King Street			15 December 1970	TR3544171099; 51°23′24″N 1°22′58″E		1094641	Upload Photo	Q26386969
16, King Street	II	16, King Street			22 February 1973	TR3542871083; 51°23′24″N 1°22′57″E		1203726	Upload Photo	Q26499239
18, King Street	II	18, King Street			22 February 1973	TR3543171080; 51°23′24″N 1°22′57″E		1094647	Upload Photo	Q26386976
21, King Street	II	21, King Street			15 December 1970	TR3545071098; 51°23′24″N 1°22′58″E		1281565	Upload Photo	Q26570600
23, King Street	II	23, King Street			15 December 1970	TR3545871096; 51°23′24″N 1°22′59″E		1094642	Upload Photo	Q26386970
24 and 24a, King Street	II	24 and 24a, King Street			22 February 1973	TR3544871073; 51°23′23″N 1°22′58″E		1094648	Upload Photo	Q26386977
25, King Street	II	25, King Street			15 December 1970	TR3547071090; 51°23′24″N 1°22′59″E		1094643	Upload Photo	Q26386971
26, King Street	II	26, King Street			22 February 1973	TR3545271072; 51°23′23″N 1°22′58″E		1281569	Upload Photo	Q26570604
27, King Street	II	27, King Street			15 December 1970	TR3548671086; 51°23′24″N 1°23′00″E		1203723	Upload Photo	Q26499237
28-32, King Street	II	28-32, King Street			22 February 1973	TR3546371075; 51°23′23″N 1°22′59″E		1351070	Upload Photo	Q26634211
29 and 31, King Street	II	29 and 31, King Street			15 December 1970	TR3549371081; 51°23′24″N 1°23′00″E		1094644	Upload Photo	Q26386973
33, King Street	II	33, King Street			15 December 1970	TR3550171076; 51°23′23″N 1°23′01″E		1094645	Upload Photo	Q26386974
35, King Street	II	35, King Street			15 December 1970	TR3550571071; 51°23′23″N 1°23′01″E		1281567	Upload Photo	Q26570602
44, King Street	II	44, King Street, CT9 1QE			22 February 1973	TR3551571044; 51°23′22″N 1°23′01″E		1094634	Upload Photo	Q26386961
Tudor House	II*	45-49, King Street			10 April 1951	TR3554871055; 51°23′23″N 1°23′03″E		1351107	Upload Photo	Q17546733
93, 95 and 95a, King Street	II	93, 95 and 95a, King Street			22 February 1973	TR3566470978; 51°23′20″N 1°23′09″E		1094646	Upload Photo	Q26386975
6, Lombard Street	II	6, Lombard Street			22 February 1973	TR3543970980; 51°23′20″N 1°22′57″E		1094649	Upload Photo	Q26386978
7, Lombard Street	II	7, Lombard Street			22 February 1973	TR3543470982; 51°23′20″N 1°22′57″E		1203727	Upload Photo	Q26499240
8 and 9, Lombard Street	II	8 and 9, Lombard Street			22 February 1973	TR3542770988; 51°23′21″N 1°22′57″E		1351071	Upload Photo	Q26634212
The Surf Boat Memorial Margate Cemetery	II*	Manston Road Cemetery			11 July 2005	TR3507069169; 51°22′22″N 1°22′34″E		1391529	Upload Photo	Q17546738
Church of England Chapel	II	Margate Cemetery			16 January 2003	TR3515069236; 51°22′24″N 1°22′38″E		1350380	Upload Photo	Q26633592
Gates and Gatepiers and Section of Curved Wall to Margate Cemetery	II	Margate Cemetery			16 January 2003	TR3506069292; 51°22′26″N 1°22′34″E		1350384	Upload Photo	Q26633595
Non Conformist Chapel	II	Margate Cemetery			16 January 2003	TR3514069224; 51°22′24″N 1°22′38″E		1350381	Upload Photo	Q26633593
War Memorial	II	Margate Cemetery			16 January 2003	TR3509869105; 51°22′20″N 1°22′35″E		1350383	Upload Photo	Q26633594
12a, Marine Gardens	II	12a, Marine Gardens			22 February 1973	TR3523370751; 51°23′13″N 1°22′46″E		1203814	Upload Photo	Q26499322
20 and 20a, Marine Gardens	II	20 and 20a, Marine Gardens			22 February 1973	TR3527770797; 51°23′15″N 1°22′49″E		1094650	Upload Photo	Q26386979
21, Marine Gardens	II	21, Marine Gardens			22 February 1973	TR3528070803; 51°23′15″N 1°22′49″E		1351072	Upload Photo	Q26634213
Clock Tower	II	Marine Terrace			22 February 1973	TR3517470755; 51°23′13″N 1°22′43″E		1351073	Upload Photo	Q26634214
Dreamland Cinema	II*	Marine Terrace			11 August 1992	TR3501170630; 51°23′10″N 1°22′34″E		1260315	Upload Photo	Q33118937
Marine Terrace Tidal Pool	II	West End Of Margate Main Sands Approximately 90m North Of Marine Terrace, CT9 1AP			30 July 2024	TR3477570847; 51°23′17″N 1°22′23″E		1485679	Upload Photo	Q134611596
Nayland Rock Promenade Shelter	II	Marine Terrace			9 October 2009	TR3478670713; 51°23′13″N 1°22′23″E		1393490	Upload Photo	Q26672648
Remains of Menagerie Enclosures and Cages at Dreamland	II	Marine Terrace			23 February 2009	TR3501270498; 51°23′05″N 1°22′34″E		1392931	Upload Photo	Q26672131
Surf Boat Memorial	II	Marine Terrace			11 July 2005	TR3474170706; 51°23′13″N 1°22′21″E		1391528	Upload Photo	Q26670885
Cinque Ports Public House	II	50, Marine Terrace			22 February 1973	TR3499170683; 51°23′11″N 1°22′34″E		1094651	Upload Photo	Q26386980
Old Town Hall	II	Market Place			22 February 1973	TR3539471031; 51°23′22″N 1°22′55″E		1351074	Upload Photo	Q26634215
2, Market Place	II	2, Market Place			22 February 1973	TR3536771025; 51°23′22″N 1°22′54″E		1094652	Upload Photo	Q26386981
3, Market Place	II	3, Market Place			22 February 1973	TR3536971030; 51°23′22″N 1°22′54″E		1094653	Upload Photo	Q26386982
4, 5 and 5a, Market Place	II	4, 5 and 5a, Market Place			22 February 1973	TR3537071037; 51°23′22″N 1°22′54″E		1351075	Upload Photo	Q26634216
6 and 6a, Market Place	II	6 and 6a, Market Place			22 February 1973	TR3541571045; 51°23′22″N 1°22′56″E		1094654	Upload Photo	Q26386983
8 and 9, Market Place	II	8 and 9, Market Place			10 April 1951	TR3543071018; 51°23′22″N 1°22′57″E		1351076	Upload Photo	Q26634217
13, Market Place	II	13, Market Place			22 February 1973	TR3540870988; 51°23′21″N 1°22′56″E		1094655	Upload Photo	Q26386984
14, Market Place	II	14, Market Place			22 February 1973	TR3540470990; 51°23′21″N 1°22′56″E		1094656	Upload Photo	Q26386985
15, Market Place	II	15, Market Place			22 February 1973	TR3539870989; 51°23′21″N 1°22′55″E		1351077	Upload Photo	Q26634218
16, Market Place	II	16, Market Place			22 February 1973	TR3539070992; 51°23′21″N 1°22′55″E		1094657	Upload Photo	Q26386986
17, Market Place	II	17, Market Place			22 February 1973	TR3538170991; 51°23′21″N 1°22′54″E		1281473	Upload Photo	Q26570524
18 and 19, Market Place	II	18 and 19, Market Place			22 February 1973	TR3537570996; 51°23′21″N 1°22′54″E		1351078	Upload Photo	Q26634219
1, Market Street	II	1, Market Street			22 February 1973	TR3536470997; 51°23′21″N 1°22′54″E		1203868	Upload Photo	Q26499372
2, Market Street	II	2, Market Street			22 February 1973	TR3535170996; 51°23′21″N 1°22′53″E		1094658	Upload Photo	Q26386987
3, Market Street	II	3, Market Street			22 February 1973	TR3534770999; 51°23′21″N 1°22′53″E		1094659	Upload Photo	Q26386988
5, Market Street	II	5, Market Street			22 February 1973	TR3533471003; 51°23′21″N 1°22′52″E		1203878	Upload Photo	Q26499382
Nash Court	II	Nash Road			22 February 1973	TR3571368738; 51°22′08″N 1°23′06″E		1094661	Upload Photo	Q26386990
Salmestone Grange Including Chapel	II*	Nash Road			10 April 1951	TR3529469567; 51°22′35″N 1°22′47″E		1281452	Upload Photo	Q17546674
Cecil Square Baptist Church	II	New Street			22 February 1973	TR3539470896; 51°23′18″N 1°22′55″E		1094662	Upload Photo	Q26386991
Sunday School to Right of Baptist Church	II	New Street			22 February 1973	TR3538370898; 51°23′18″N 1°22′54″E		1203940	Upload Photo	Q26499440
8-10, New Street	II	8-10, New Street			22 February 1973	TR3537070916; 51°23′18″N 1°22′54″E		1094663	Upload Photo	Q26386992
East Northdown Farm Tythe Barn	II	Northdown			16 January 1987	TR3825170315; 51°22′55″N 1°25′21″E		1241807	Upload Photo	Q26534660
Cottage Adjoining East Northdown House to the South West	II	Northdown Park Road			22 February 1973	TR3817870286; 51°22′54″N 1°25′17″E		1203975	Upload Photo	Q26499474
East Northdown Cottage with Barn Attached	II	Northdown Park Road			22 February 1973	TR3819770263; 51°22′53″N 1°25′18″E		1094666	Upload Photo	Q26386995
East Northdown Farmhouse	II	Northdown Park Road			10 April 1951	TR3824770279; 51°22′53″N 1°25′21″E		1094664	Upload Photo	Q26386993
East Northdown House	II	Northdown Park Road			22 February 1973	TR3819170298; 51°22′54″N 1°25′18″E		1094665	Upload Photo	Q26386994
Northdown House	II	Northdown Park Road, Northdown Park			30 June 1971	TR3792270180; 51°22′51″N 1°25′04″E		1281445	Upload Photo	Q26570497
Honeysuckle Cottage	II	215, Northdown Park Road			22 February 1973	TR3805870117; 51°22′49″N 1°25′11″E		1203952	Upload Photo	Q26499450
Church of St Paul, Vicarage and Boundary Walls	II	Northdown Road			14 September 2010	TR3620571015; 51°23′20″N 1°23′37″E		1393961	Upload Photo	Q26673095
St Stephen's Methodist Church	II	Northdown Road, Cliftonville			9 November 1981	TR3609971066; 51°23′22″N 1°23′32″E		1241712	Upload Photo	Q26534572
2, Northdown Road	II	2, Northdown Road			22 February 1973	TR3566271086; 51°23′23″N 1°23′09″E		1094692	Upload Photo	Q26387020
West Northdown Cottage	II	3, Omer Avenue			22 February 1973	TR3727670794; 51°23′12″N 1°24′32″E		1351079	Upload Photo	Q26634220
West Northdown Farmhouse and Stable Cottage Adjoining	II	16, Omer Avenue			10 April 1951	TR3736770869; 51°23′14″N 1°24′37″E		1094667	Upload Photo	Q26386996
Urinal	II	Park Road			6 May 1997	TR3604270781; 51°23′13″N 1°23′28″E		1271810	Upload Photo	Q26561718
14-19, Princes Crescent	II	14-19, Princes Crescent			22 February 1973	TR3558370534; 51°23′06″N 1°23′04″E		1094669	Upload Photo	Q26386998
1 to 7, Princes Crescent	II	1 To 7, Princes Crescent, CT9 1LY			22 February 1973	TR3562070476; 51°23′04″N 1°23′06″E		1203982	Upload Photo	Q26499480
Dairy Cottage	II	Queen Elizabeth Avenue			22 February 1973	TR3780470262; 51°22′54″N 1°24′58″E		1351081	Upload Photo	Q26634222
Cliff Lift	II	Queens Promenade			5 November 2014	TR3672971392; 51°23′32″N 1°24′05″E		1422305	Upload Photo	Q26676939
6-12, Royal Crescent	II	6-12, Royal Crescent, Westbrook			22 February 1973	TR3458570658; 51°23′11″N 1°22′12″E		1351084	Upload Photo	Q26634225
3-11 (cons), Sea View Terrace	II	3-11 (cons), Sea View Terrace			13 February 2009	TR3442070607; 51°23′10″N 1°22′04″E		1393124	Upload Photo	Q26672312
Gates and Wall to Railway Convalescent Home	II	Shottendane Road			22 February 1973	TR3515869606; 51°22′36″N 1°22′40″E		1094680	Upload Photo	Q26387009
Railway Convalescent Home	II	Shottendane Road			22 February 1973	TR3513969653; 51°22′38″N 1°22′39″E		1281380	Upload Photo	Q26570433
Shottendane Farmhouse	II	Shottendane Road			22 February 1973	TR3497769570; 51°22′35″N 1°22′30″E		1281383	Upload Photo	Q26570436
Group of Five Memorials to the Sanger Family Including 'Lord' George Sanger	II	St John's Cemetery, Manston Road			26 January 2012	TR3518469212; 51°22′24″N 1°22′40″E		1405197	Upload Photo	Q26675715
John Sanger Memorial	II*	St John's Cemetery, Manston Road			16 January 2003	TR3518769213; 51°22′24″N 1°22′40″E		1350382	Upload Photo	Q17546722
Memorial to Charles Lemon Frazer Daniell Rnr	II	St John's Cemetery, Manston Road			24 January 2011	TR3518669209; 51°22′24″N 1°22′40″E		1396417	Upload Photo	Q26675204
Memorial to Edmund Leonard George Betts	II	St John's Cemetery, Manston Road			24 January 2011	TR3511669138; 51°22′21″N 1°22′36″E		1396419	Upload Photo	Q26675206
Memorial to Flight Sub Lieutenant Reginald Lord Rnas	II	St John's Cemetery, Manston Road			26 January 2012	TR3508869159; 51°22′22″N 1°22′35″E		1405240	Upload Photo	Q26675719
Memorial to Harry Spencer Paramor	II	St John's Cemetery, Manston Road			24 January 2011	TR3508869267; 51°22′26″N 1°22′35″E		1396418	Upload Photo	Q26675205
13, St John's Road	II	13, St John's Road			22 February 1973	TR3553170614; 51°23′08″N 1°23′01″E		1351085	Upload Photo	Q26634226
18, St John's Road	II	18, St John's Road			22 February 1973	TR3556970585; 51°23′07″N 1°23′03″E		1094676	Upload Photo	Q26387005
18a, St John's Road	II	18a, St John's Road			22 February 1973	TR3555970580; 51°23′07″N 1°23′03″E		1351086	Upload Photo	Q26634227
6, St John's Street	II	6, St John's Street			22 February 1973	TR3555070570; 51°23′07″N 1°23′02″E		1094677	Upload Photo	Q26387006
Draper's Almhouses	II	St Peter's Road			22 February 1973	TR3619369689; 51°22′38″N 1°23′33″E		1094679	Upload Photo	Q26387008
Isle of Thanet District Hospital (margate Wing)	II	St Peter's Road			22 February 1973	TR3596569788; 51°22′41″N 1°23′22″E		1281373	Upload Photo	Q26570426
The Lodge Draper's Almhouses	II	St Peter's Road			22 February 1973	TR3622769667; 51°22′37″N 1°23′35″E		1351050	Upload Photo	Q26634192
Draper's Windmill Including Brick Engine House, Workshop And Cart Shed, And Lean-to	II	St. Peters Footpath, CT9 2SP			22 February 1973	TR3622870010; 51°22′48″N 1°23′36″E		1351087	Upload Photo	Q5305838
Margate Railway Station	II	Station Road			25 August 1987	TR3472870545; 51°23′07″N 1°22′20″E		1260321	Upload Photo	Q4296894
Water Tower at Margate Station	II	Station Road			20 May 1988	TR3462370517; 51°23′07″N 1°22′14″E		1241829	Upload Photo	Q26534681
Droit House	II	Stone Pier			22 February 1973	TR3533171220; 51°23′28″N 1°22′52″E		1204115	Upload Photo	Q26499594
Stone Pier	II	The Parade			29 November 1989	TR3524571233; 51°23′29″N 1°22′48″E		1260334	Upload Photo	Q26551359
13, 14, 14a, 15 and 16, The Parade	II	13, 14, 14a, 15 and 16, The Parade			22 February 1973	TR3532371045; 51°23′23″N 1°22′52″E		1203977	Upload Photo	Q26499476
19, The Parade	II	19, The Parade			22 February 1973	TR3530471009; 51°23′22″N 1°22′50″E		1094668	Upload Photo	Q26386997
Ingoldsby House	II	20, The Parade			22 February 1973	TR3530071011; 51°23′22″N 1°22′50″E		1351080	Upload Photo	Q26634221
21, The Parade	II	21, The Parade			22 February 1973	TR3529671014; 51°23′22″N 1°22′50″E		1203979	Upload Photo	Q26499478
Bank and Railings Outside Nos 1 to 7 (consec)	II	Trinity Square			22 February 1973	TR3555871139; 51°23′25″N 1°23′04″E		1281339	Upload Photo	Q26570395
War Memorials to World War I and World War II and Surrounding Walls, Paving And Approach	II	Trinity Square			10 August 2010	TR3558971136; 51°23′25″N 1°23′05″E		1393910	Upload Photo	Q26673044
1, Trinity Square	II	1, Trinity Square			22 February 1973	TR3553771129; 51°23′25″N 1°23′03″E		1281335	Upload Photo	Q26570392
2, Trinity Square	II	2, Trinity Square			22 February 1973	TR3554371133; 51°23′25″N 1°23′03″E		1094686	Upload Photo	Q26387014
3, Trinity Square	II	3, Trinity Square			22 February 1973	TR3554771140; 51°23′25″N 1°23′03″E		1094687	Upload Photo	Q26387015
4-6, Trinity Square	II	4-6, Trinity Square			22 February 1973	TR3555371148; 51°23′26″N 1°23′04″E		1204160	Upload Photo	Q26499636
7, Trinity Square	II	7, Trinity Square			22 February 1973	TR3555771160; 51°23′26″N 1°23′04″E		1351051	Upload Photo	Q26634193
Park View	II	9, Trinity Square			22 February 1973	TR3556371173; 51°23′26″N 1°23′04″E		1094688	Upload Photo	Q26387016
10-19, Trinity Square	II	10-19, Trinity Square			22 February 1973	TR3557671196; 51°23′27″N 1°23′05″E		1094689	Upload Photo	Q26387017
20-24, Trinity Square	II	20-24, Trinity Square			22 February 1973	TR3559571234; 51°23′28″N 1°23′06″E		1204168	Upload Photo	Q26499643
47 and 48, Trinity Square	II	47 and 48, Trinity Square			22 February 1973	TR3576471237; 51°23′28″N 1°23′15″E		1351052	Upload Photo	Q26634194
Rose in June Public House	II	49, Trinity Square			22 February 1973	TR3575571232; 51°23′28″N 1°23′14″E		1281344	Upload Photo	Q26570401
53-57, Trinity Square	II	53-57, Trinity Square			22 February 1973	TR3571371168; 51°23′26″N 1°23′12″E		1094690	Upload Photo	Q26387018
58-60, Trinity Square	II	58-60, Trinity Square			22 February 1973	TR3570371149; 51°23′25″N 1°23′11″E		1351053	Upload Photo	Q26634195
61-64, Trinity Square	II	61-64, Trinity Square			22 February 1973	TR3569471132; 51°23′25″N 1°23′11″E		1204179	Upload Photo	Q26499653
65 and 66, Trinity Square	II	65 and 66, Trinity Square			22 February 1973	TR3568571118; 51°23′24″N 1°23′10″E		1094691	Upload Photo	Q26387019
74-79, Trinity Square	II	74-79, Trinity Square			22 February 1973	TR3562371086; 51°23′24″N 1°23′07″E		1204184	Upload Photo	Q26499658
80, Trinity Square	II	80, Trinity Square			22 February 1973	TR3559771088; 51°23′24″N 1°23′06″E		1351054	Upload Photo	Q26634196
82 and 83, Trinity Square	II	82 and 83, Trinity Square, CT9 1HS			22 February 1973	TR3556571102; 51°23′24″N 1°23′04″E		1204192	Upload Photo	Q26499665
83a, Trinity Square	II	83a, Trinity Square, CT9 1HS			22 February 1973	TR3556071099; 51°23′24″N 1°23′04″E		1350894	Upload Photo	Q26634050
84 and 85, Trinity Square	II	84 and 85, Trinity Square, CT9 1HS, CT9 1QD			22 February 1973	TR3555971091; 51°23′24″N 1°23′04″E		1095048	Upload Photo	Q26387378
Former Congregational Church (now Mosque)	II	Union Crescent			18 October 2010	TR3548870850; 51°23′16″N 1°23′00″E		1394721	Upload Photo	Q26673774
1, Union Crescent	II	1, Union Crescent			22 February 1973	TR3546670828; 51°23′15″N 1°22′58″E		1350895	Upload Photo	Q26634051
3-12, Union Crescent	II	3-12, Union Crescent			22 February 1973	TR3555870832; 51°23′15″N 1°23′03″E		1281318	Upload Photo	Q26570377
17-23, Union Crescent	II	17-23, Union Crescent			22 February 1973	TR3558970794; 51°23′14″N 1°23′05″E		1095049	Upload Photo	Q26387379
1-3, Union Row	II	1-3, Union Row			22 February 1973	TR3553270854; 51°23′16″N 1°23′02″E		1204217	Upload Photo	Q26499687
3, Vicarage Place	II	3, Vicarage Place			22 February 1973	TR3551470337; 51°22′59″N 1°23′00″E		1095050	Upload Photo	Q26387380
4-17, Vicarage Place	II	4-17, Vicarage Place			22 February 1973	TR3554470312; 51°22′59″N 1°23′01″E		1281328	Upload Photo	Q26570385
17 and 19, Victoria Road	II	17 and 19, Victoria Road			22 February 1973	TR3561370412; 51°23′02″N 1°23′05″E		1350896	Upload Photo	Q26634052
58, Victoria Road	II	58, Victoria Road, CT9 1NA			22 February 1973	TR3579870722; 51°23′11″N 1°23′15″E		1095051	Upload Photo	Q26387381
10-13, Zion Place	II	10-13, Zion Place			22 February 1973	TR3585371241; 51°23′28″N 1°23′19″E		1095052	Upload Photo	Q26387382

== See also ==
- Grade I listed buildings in Kent
- Grade II* listed buildings in Kent

== Sources ==
- Newman, John (2013) [1969], Kent: North-East and East, The Buildings of England, New Haven and London: Yale University Press, ISBN 978-0-300-18506-5
