= Listed buildings in Manston, Kent =

Historic structures in Kent, England

Manston is a village and civil parish in the Thanet District of Kent, England. It contains nine grade II listed buildings that are recorded in the National Heritage List for England.

This list is based on the information retrieved online from Historic England.

== Key ==
Grade	Criteria
I	Buildings that are of exceptional interest
II*	Particularly important buildings of more than special interest
II	Buildings that are of special interest

== Listing ==
Name	Grade	Location	Type	Completed (Note: The date given is the date used by Historic England as significant for the initial building or that of an important part in the structure's description.)	Date designated	Grid ref. (Note: The grid reference is based on the British national grid reference system, sometimes known as OSGB36, used by the Ordnance Survey.) Geo-coordinates	Notes	Entry number (Note: The "List Entry Number" is a unique number assigned to each listed building and scheduled monument by Historic England.)	Image	Wikidata
Granary About 25 Metres South of Manston Court Farmhouse	II	Manston Court Road			4 February 1988	TR3430966624; 51°21′01″N 1°21′49″E		1336626	Upload Photo	Q26621108
Manston Court and Wall Adjacent	II	Manston Court Road			13 August 1968	TR3433866633; 51°21′02″N 1°21′50″E		1336625	Upload Photo	Q26621107
Grove Farmhouse and Walled Front Garden	II	Manston Road			13 September 1974	TR3481366091; 51°20′43″N 1°22′13″E		1085442	Upload Photo	Q26372581
Old Forge House	II	Manston Road			13 September 1974	TR3479466176; 51°20′46″N 1°22′13″E		1336624	Upload Photo	Q26621106
Remains of Monastic Building, Now Outbuilding	II	Now Outbuilding, Manston Court Road			13 August 1968	TR3432866655; 51°21′02″N 1°21′50″E		1085443	Upload Photo	Q26372587
Barn at Manston Green	II	Preston Road			4 February 1988	TR3476666223; 51°20′48″N 1°22′11″E		1085445	Upload Photo	Q26372597
Barn at Preston Farm (tr 3507 6686)	II	Preston Road			4 February 1988	TR3507466858; 51°21′08″N 1°22′29″E		1085444	Upload Photo	Q26372592
Manston War Memorial	II	Preston Road And High Street, CT12 5BE	war memorial		5 November 2015	TR3475966157; 51°20′46″N 1°22′11″E		1430779	Manston War Memorial More images	Q26677649
Flete Lodge	II	Vincent Road			22 February 1973	TR3468567440; 51°21′27″N 1°22′10″E		1204244	Upload Photo	Q26499712

== See also ==
- Grade I listed buildings in Kent
- Grade II* listed buildings in Kent

== Sources ==
- Newman, John (2013) [1969], Kent: North-East and East, The Buildings of England, New Haven and London: Yale University Press, ISBN 978-0-300-18506-5
