= Listed buildings in Ramsgate =

Civil Parish in Kent, England

Ramsgate is a town and civil parish in the Thanet District of Kent, England. It contains five grade I, twelve II*, 432 grade II listed buildings that are recorded in the National Heritage List for England.

This list is based on the information retrieved online from Historic England

== Key ==
Grade	Criteria
I	Buildings that are of exceptional interest
II*	Particularly important buildings of more than special interest
II	Buildings that are of special interest

== Listing ==
Name	Grade	Location	Type	Completed (Note: The date given is the date used by Historic England as significant for the initial building or that of an important part in the structure's description.)	Date designated	Grid ref. (Note: The grid reference is based on the British national grid reference system, sometimes known as OSGB36, used by the Ordnance Survey.) Geo-coordinates	Notes	Entry number (Note: The "List Entry Number" is a unique number assigned to each listed building and scheduled monument by Historic England.)	Image	Wikidata
Wintons Cottage with Garden Wall	II	Abbot's Hill			27 September 1976	TR3836164956; 51°20′01″N 1°25′14″E		1085446	Upload Photo	Q26372603
Nos 18 to 38 with Railed Areas	II	18-38, Abbot's Hill			7 November 1983	TR3836864921; 51°20′00″N 1°25′14″E		1085447	Upload Photo	Q26372608
44, Abbot's Hill	II	44, Abbot's Hill			4 February 1988	TR3842464877; 51°19′59″N 1°25′17″E		1111824	Upload Photo	Q26405620
Kent County Council	II	Aberdeen House, Ellington Road, CT11 9ST			22 May 2019	TR3763065184; 51°20′10″N 1°24′37″E		1461392	Upload Photo	Q66479986
14, Addington Street	II	14, Addington Street			4 February 1988	TR3796564631; 51°19′51″N 1°24′53″E		1111798	Upload Photo	Q26405594
The Falstaff	II	16-18, Addington Street			4 February 1988	TR3796964627; 51°19′51″N 1°24′53″E		1336627	Upload Photo	Q26621109
20, Addington Street	II	20, Addington Street			4 February 1988	TR3797664613; 51°19′51″N 1°24′53″E		1336628	Upload Photo	Q26621110
Duke of York	II	25, Addington Street			4 February 1988	TR3793364633; 51°19′52″N 1°24′51″E		1085416	Upload Photo	Q26372448
27, Addington Street	II	27, Addington Street			4 February 1988	TR3793864628; 51°19′51″N 1°24′51″E		1350019	Upload Photo	Q26633259
31 and 29, Addington Street	II	31 and 29, Addington Street			4 February 1988	TR3794464620; 51°19′51″N 1°24′51″E		1085454	Upload Photo	Q26372648
33, Addington Street	II	33, Addington Street			4 February 1988	TR3795364609; 51°19′51″N 1°24′52″E		1298971	Upload Photo	Q26586405
35 and 37, Addington Street	II	35 and 37, Addington Street			4 February 1988	TR3795664606; 51°19′51″N 1°24′52″E		1085453	Upload Photo	Q26372641
41, Addington Street	II	41, Addington Street			12 January 1976	TR3796964587; 51°19′50″N 1°24′53″E		1186878	Upload Photo	Q26482120
49, Addington Street	II	49, Addington Street			13 June 1986	TR3797764573; 51°19′50″N 1°24′53″E		1336630	Upload Photo	Q26621112
No 50 and Railed Forecourt	II	50, Addington Street			4 February 1988	TR3802764541; 51°19′48″N 1°24′56″E		1111800	Upload Photo	Q26405596
Queen Charlotte Public House	II	57, Addington Street			4 February 1988	TR3798264555; 51°19′49″N 1°24′53″E		1299002	Upload Photo	Q26586433
No 71 and Railed Area	II	71, Addington Street			4 February 1988	TR3800864533; 51°19′48″N 1°24′55″E		1085452	Upload Photo	Q26372637
No 73 and Railed Area	II	73, Addington Street			4 February 1988	TR3801164530; 51°19′48″N 1°24′55″E		1186863	Upload Photo	Q26482105
Nos 75 and 77 with Railed Areas	II	75 and 77, Addington Street			13 September 1974	TR3801364525; 51°19′48″N 1°24′55″E		1336629	Upload Photo	Q26621111
81, Addington Street	II	81, Addington Street			4 February 1988	TR3801964511; 51°19′47″N 1°24′55″E		1186857	Upload Photo	Q26482100
83, Addington Street	II	83, Addington Street			4 February 1988	TR3803364503; 51°19′47″N 1°24′56″E		1085451	Upload Photo	Q26372631
Nos 12 and 13 and Railings	II	12 and 13, Adelaide Gardens			4 February 1988	TR3812064720; 51°19′54″N 1°25′01″E		1085448	Upload Photo	Q26372615
27, Adelaide Gardens	II	27, Adelaide Gardens			4 February 1988	TR3809264690; 51°19′53″N 1°24′59″E		1111827	Upload Photo	Q26405622
29, Adelaide Gardens	II	29, Adelaide Gardens			4 February 1988	TR3809864682; 51°19′53″N 1°25′00″E		1085449	Upload Photo	Q26372620
31, Adelaide Gardens	II	31, Adelaide Gardens			4 February 1988	TR3810364673; 51°19′53″N 1°25′00″E		1111832	Upload Photo	Q26405627
32, Adelaide Gardens	II	32, Adelaide Gardens			4 February 1988	TR3810664669; 51°19′52″N 1°25′00″E		1085450	Upload Photo	Q26372625
3-13, Albert Road	II	3-13, Albert Road			4 February 1988	TR3889165309; 51°20′12″N 1°25′42″E		1336649	Upload Photo	Q26621130
18, Albert Street	II	18, Albert Street			4 February 1988	TR3809764722; 51°19′54″N 1°25′00″E		1085417	Upload Photo	Q26372453
Nos 24 and 26 and Railed Areas	II	24 and 26, Albion Hill			4 February 1988	TR3842164871; 51°19′58″N 1°25′17″E		1336650	Upload Photo	Q26621131
No 1 with Railed Area	II	1, Albion Place			13 September 1974	TR3843464881; 51°19′59″N 1°25′17″E		1099168	Upload Photo	Q26391320
No 2 and Railed Area	II	2, Albion Place			13 September 1974	TR3843864887; 51°19′59″N 1°25′18″E		1336653	Upload Photo	Q26685004
No 3 with Railed Area	II	3, Albion Place			13 September 1974	TR3844264891; 51°19′59″N 1°25′18″E		1099157	Upload Photo	Q26391309
No 4 with Railed Area	II	4, Albion Place			13 September 1974	TR3844864896; 51°19′59″N 1°25′18″E		1085422	Upload Photo	Q26372477
No 5 with Railed Area	II	5, Albion Place			13 September 1974	TR3845164902; 51°19′59″N 1°25′18″E		1099153	Upload Photo	Q26391305
No 6 with Railed Area	II	6, Albion Place			13 September 1974	TR3845664904; 51°20′00″N 1°25′19″E		1085421	Upload Photo	Q26372474
No 10 with Railed Area	II	10, Albion Place			13 September 1974	TR3847364922; 51°20′00″N 1°25′19″E		1336652	Upload Photo	Q26621133
No 11 with Railed Area	II	11, Albion Place			13 September 1974	TR3847664926; 51°20′00″N 1°25′20″E		1085420	Upload Photo	Q26372467
Nos 12 to 15 Inclusive With Railed Areas	II	12-15, Albion Place			13 September 1974	TR3848164932; 51°20′00″N 1°25′20″E		1336651	Upload Photo	Q26621132
20, Albion Place	II	20, Albion Place			13 September 1974	TR3852364898; 51°19′59″N 1°25′22″E		1085419	Upload Photo	Q26372464
Albion House	II	27, Albion Place			13 September 1974	TR3856064874; 51°19′58″N 1°25′24″E		1085418	Upload Photo	Q26372459
No 6 with Courtyard Wall and Garage/outhouse	II	Albion Road			17 October 1988	TR3873065336; 51°20′13″N 1°25′34″E		1086052	Upload Photo	Q26375522
2 and 4, Ashburnham Road	II	2 and 4, Ashburnham Road			4 February 1988	TR3722965148; 51°20′09″N 1°24′16″E		1336654	Upload Photo	Q26621135
39, Ashburnham Road	II	39, Ashburnham Road			4 February 1988	TR3709265156; 51°20′10″N 1°24′09″E		1085423	Upload Photo	Q26372484
Nos 1-31 with Railed Areas	II	1-31, Augusta Road			13 August 1968	TR3863765150; 51°20′07″N 1°25′28″E		1099136	Upload Photo	Q26391291
Nos 2-10 with Railed Areas	II	2-10, Augusta Road			13 August 1968	TR3865265184; 51°20′08″N 1°25′29″E		1099170	Upload Photo	Q26391322
Nos 12-22 and Railed Areas	II	12-22, Augusta Road			4 February 1988	TR3866365178; 51°20′08″N 1°25′30″E		1085424	Upload Photo	Q26372489
Church of the Holy Trinity	II	Bellevue Road			4 February 1988	TR3866965333; 51°20′13″N 1°25′31″E		1085426	Upload Photo	Q26372498
The Iron Duke and Railed Area	II	2, Bellevue Road			11 July 1978	TR3855765094; 51°20′05″N 1°25′24″E		1349101	Upload Photo	Q26632420
Nos 7	II	9 and 11 Railed Areas, 7, 9 and 11, Bellevue Road			4 February 1988	TR3859365115; 51°20′06″N 1°25′26″E		1085425	Upload Photo	Q26372494
Nos 13 and 15 and Railed Area	II	13 and 15, Bellevue Road			4 February 1988	TR3859665123; 51°20′06″N 1°25′26″E		1099118	Upload Photo	Q26391273
No 14 and Area	II	14, Bellevue Road			4 February 1988	TR3857265125; 51°20′06″N 1°25′25″E		1085428	Upload Photo	Q26372509
22, Bellevue Road	II	22, Bellevue Road, CT11 8LB			13 September 1974	TR3858165147; 51°20′07″N 1°25′26″E		1099103	Upload Photo	Q26391259
25 Bellevue Road, Ramsgate	II	25, Bellevue Road, CT11 8JT			22 May 2019	TR3865665236; 51°20′10″N 1°25′30″E		1461388	Upload Photo	Q64029164
Nos 38	II	40, 42 and 44 And Railed Areas, 38, 42 and 44, Bellevue Road			13 August 1968	TR3860665196; 51°20′09″N 1°25′27″E		1085427	Upload Photo	Q26372503
Nos 46	II	48 and 50 And Railed Areas, 46, 48 and 50, Bellevue Road			13 August 1968	TR3861365212; 51°20′09″N 1°25′27″E		1099133	Upload Photo	Q26391288
Gas Works, Offices With Railed Area, Depot And Adjoining Walls And Gate	II	Boundary Road			4 February 1988	TR3833565457; 51°20′18″N 1°25′14″E		1085429	Upload Photo	Q26372515
Tomb Chest to Kent Family	II	About 25 Metres East Of Church Of St George, Broad Street			4 February 1988	TR3819765243; 51°20′11″N 1°25′06″E		1100343	Upload Photo	Q26392478
Tomb Chest to Francis Lemm	II	About 5 Metres North West Of Church Of St George, Broad Street			4 February 1988	TR3813965197; 51°20′09″N 1°25′03″E		1348692	Tomb Chest to Francis Lemm More images	Q26632055
Church of St George	I	Broad Street			4 February 1988	TR3816665212; 51°20′10″N 1°25′04″E		1085430	Church of St George More images	Q17530169
Gates and Railings to Churchyard of St George	II	Broad Street			4 February 1988	TR3814065172; 51°20′09″N 1°25′03″E		1085432	Gates and Railings to Churchyard of St George More images	Q26372526
Tomb Chest to Caroline Gibson about 40 Metres North of Church of St George	II	Broad Street			4 February 1988	TR3814865247; 51°20′11″N 1°25′03″E		1100337	Upload Photo	Q26392465
Tomb Chest to Elizabeth Biggs and Thomas Grundy about 30 Metres North of Church of St George	II	Broad Street			4 February 1988	TR3815865248; 51°20′11″N 1°25′04″E		1336617	Upload Photo	Q26621099
Tomb Chest to Janet McLeod about 42 Metres North of Church of St George	II	Broad Street			4 February 1988	TR3815065253; 51°20′11″N 1°25′04″E		1085431	Upload Photo	Q26372522
Tomb Chest to William Blackman about 20 Metres North West of Church of St George	II	Broad Street			4 February 1988	TR3812965187; 51°20′09″N 1°25′02″E		1336655	Upload Photo	Q26621136
10, Broad Street	II	10, Broad Street			4 February 1988	TR3818365116; 51°20′07″N 1°25′05″E		1085433	Upload Photo	Q26372531
12, Broad Street	II	12, Broad Street			4 February 1988	TR3817865121; 51°20′07″N 1°25′05″E		1100299	Upload Photo	Q26392398
Nos 13-19 with Railed Area	II	13-19, Broad Street			4 February 1988	TR3819165133; 51°20′07″N 1°25′05″E		1348703	Upload Photo	Q26632063
East Court Annexe	II	Brockenhurst Road, CT11 8ED			4 February 1988	TR3900365481; 51°20′17″N 1°25′48″E		1203575	Upload Photo	Q26499096
East Court	II*	Brockenhurst Road, CT11 8ED			4 February 1988	TR3903765458; 51°20′17″N 1°25′50″E		1086073	Upload Photo	Q26375630
Water Tower and Adjacent Range to North West	II	About 50 Metres East Of Cannon Brewery Buildings, Cannon Road			4 February 1988	TR3790565199; 51°20′10″N 1°24′51″E		1336618	Upload Photo	Q26621100
Brewery Buildings, Now Depository	II	Cannon Road			4 February 1988	TR3788065168; 51°20′09″N 1°24′49″E		1348497	Upload Photo	Q26631873
Cavendish Baptist Church	II	Cavendish Street			4 February 1988	TR3814764986; 51°20′03″N 1°25′03″E		1348516	Upload Photo	Q26631892
George and Dragon Public House	II	Cavendish Street			4 February 1988	TR3814465021; 51°20′04″N 1°25′03″E		1348550	Upload Photo	Q26631923
9, 11, 13 and 15, Cavendish Street	II	9, 11, 13 and 15, Cavendish Street			4 February 1988	TR3819564969; 51°20′02″N 1°25′05″E		1100313	Upload Photo	Q26392420
17, 19 and 21, Cavendish Street	II	17, 19 and 21, Cavendish Street			4 February 1988	TR3817864998; 51°20′03″N 1°25′04″E		1085434	Upload Photo	Q26372538
Canvendish Villas and Railed Area	II	23 and 25, Cavendish Street			4 February 1988	TR3816465005; 51°20′03″N 1°25′04″E		1348525	Upload Photo	Q26631900
27 and 29, Cavendish Street	II	27 and 29, Cavendish Street			4 February 1988	TR3817864989; 51°20′03″N 1°25′04″E		1336619	Upload Photo	Q26621101
Headstone to Hephzibah and Alfred Pite	II	At 384 661, About 200 Metres North East Of Cemetery Chapel, Cecilia Road			4 February 1988	TR3832866235; 51°20′43″N 1°25′15″E		1336639	Upload Photo	Q26621121
Cemetery Chapels	II*	Cecilia Road			4 February 1988	TR3836666033; 51°20′36″N 1°25′17″E		1348349	Upload Photo	Q17546715
Monument to Woodward Family about 75 Metres North of Cemetery Chapel With Plot Wall	II	Cecilia Road			4 February 1988	TR3837266100; 51°20′38″N 1°25′17″E		1085395	Upload Photo	Q26372337
Gate House to Cemetery about 50 Metres South of Cemetery Chapel With Side Walls	II	Cecilia Road			4 February 1988	TR3834765957; 51°20′34″N 1°25′15″E		1085436	Upload Photo	Q26372550
Little Cliffsend Farm	II	Chalk Hill, Cliffsend, CT12 5HP			8 December 2015	TR3572464384; 51°19′47″N 1°22′56″E		1429581	Upload Photo	Q26677537
Former Kent Adult Education Centre	II	Chapel Place			22 February 2006	TR3791065010; 51°20′04″N 1°24′51″E		1392983	Upload Photo	Q26672178
Nos 21 to 33 and Railed Steps	II	Chapel Place			4 February 1988	TR3794065046; 51°20′05″N 1°24′52″E		1336640	Upload Photo	Q26621122
5-19, Chapel Place	II	5-19, Chapel Place			13 September 1974	TR3801065125; 51°20′07″N 1°24′56″E		1085396	Upload Photo	Q26372344
Chapel Cottage	II	Chapel Place Lane			4 February 1988	TR3800665141; 51°20′08″N 1°24′56″E		1085397	Upload Photo	Q26372348
Numbers 1 to 5 Inclusive With Railed Areas	II	Chatham Place			13 August 1968	TR3799165393; 51°20′16″N 1°24′56″E		1085398	Upload Photo	Q26372355
Chatham House School and Railed Area	II	Chatham Street			4 February 1988	TR3804365255; 51°20′11″N 1°24′58″E		1336641	Upload Photo	Q26621123
Townley House Mansion	II*	Chatham Street			13 September 1974	TR3799165337; 51°20′14″N 1°24′56″E		1336642	Upload Photo	Q17546695
31, Chatham Street	II	31, Chatham Street			4 February 1988	TR3796565436; 51°20′17″N 1°24′54″E		1085399	Upload Photo	Q26372360
Chilton Farmhouse	II*	Chilton Lane			4 February 1988	TR3633864593; 51°19′53″N 1°23′29″E		1085400	Upload Photo	Q17546630
No 1 and Railed Area	II	1, Church Road			4 February 1988	TR3819765149; 51°20′08″N 1°25′06″E		1085401	Upload Photo	Q26372365
No 3 with Railed Area	II	3, Church Road			4 February 1988	TR3819965152; 51°20′08″N 1°25′06″E		1101781	Upload Photo	Q26395576
Nos 5 to 17 and Railed Areas	II	5-17, Church Road			4 February 1988	TR3820765169; 51°20′08″N 1°25′06″E		1336643	Upload Photo	Q26621124
Chatham and Clarendon House Grammar School (upper School Site)	II	Clarendon Gardens, CT11 9BB			22 May 2019	TR3800264888; 51°20′00″N 1°24′55″E		1460833	Upload Photo	Q66479976
No 6 and Railed Area	II	6, Cliff Street			4 February 1988	TR3815164808; 51°19′57″N 1°25′03″E		1101783	Upload Photo	Q26395579
Nos 1 to 5 Inclusive with Railed Areas	II	1-5, Clifton Lawn			4 February 1988	TR3778764441; 51°19′46″N 1°24′43″E		1085402	Upload Photo	Q26372370
Granville Court	II	D'este Road, CT11 8DD			16 October 1973	TR3879765183; 51°20′08″N 1°25′37″E		1203535	Upload Photo	Q7737547
Prayer Hall and Section of Attached Cemetery Wall to Ramsgate Jewish Cemetery	II	Dumpton Park Road			17 March 2008	TR3822665910; 51°20′32″N 1°25′09″E		1392476	Upload Photo	Q26671693
Granville Marina	II	1-4, East Cliff			21 December 2004	TR3885965149; 51°20′07″N 1°25′40″E		1391165	Upload Photo	Q17060664
The Lido	II	Eastern Quadrant, Royal Esplanade			4 February 1988	TR3715464156; 51°19′37″N 1°24′10″E		1336323	Upload Photo	Q26620820
No 12 with Railed Area	II	Effingham Street			4 February 1988	TR3813664889; 51°19′59″N 1°25′02″E		1085407	Upload Photo	Q26372400
Railings and Wall about 20 Metres West of Chancery House	II	Effingham Street			4 February 1988	TR3816964870; 51°19′59″N 1°25′04″E		1347785	Upload Photo	Q26631213
The Rising Sun	II	Effingham Street			4 February 1988	TR3816064860; 51°19′59″N 1°25′03″E		1083595	Upload Photo	Q26365857
5, Effingham Street	II	5, Effingham Street, CT11 9AT			4 February 1988	TR3817864878; 51°19′59″N 1°25′04″E		1336644	Upload Photo	Q26621125
10, Effingham Street	II	10, Effingham Street			4 February 1988	TR3814664887; 51°19′59″N 1°25′02″E		1085408	Upload Photo	Q26372404
Kent Fire and Rescue Services	II	18-20, Effingham Street, CT11 9AT			4 February 1988	TR3811264916; 51°20′00″N 1°25′01″E		1101734	Upload Photo	Q26395481
29, Effingham Street	II	29, Effingham Street			13 March 1989	TR3811664951; 51°20′02″N 1°25′01″E		1252979	Upload Photo	Q26544797
31, Effingham Street	II	31, Effingham Street			13 March 1989	TR3811464957; 51°20′02″N 1°25′01″E		1252980	Upload Photo	Q26544798
32, Effingham Street	II	32, Effingham Street			4 February 1988	TR3809264945; 51°20′01″N 1°25′00″E		1347806	Upload Photo	Q26631234
No 34 with Area	II	34, Effingham Street			13 September 1974	TR3808964949; 51°20′02″N 1°25′00″E		1085405	Upload Photo	Q26372387
35, Effingham Street	II	35, Effingham Street			13 September 1974	TR3810364974; 51°20′02″N 1°25′00″E		1085403	Upload Photo	Q26372376
36, Effingham Street	II	36, Effingham Street			4 February 1988	TR3808464954; 51°20′02″N 1°24′59″E		1101746	Upload Photo	Q26395506
39, Effingham Street	II	39, Effingham Street			4 February 1988	TR3809464988; 51°20′03″N 1°25′00″E		1101779	Upload Photo	Q26395573
24, Effingham Street	II	24, Effingham Street, CT11 9AT			13 September 1974	TR3810064924; 51°20′01″N 1°25′00″E		1085406	Upload Photo	Q26372394
Barbers Almshouses	II	Elms Avenue, CT11 9BN			22 May 2019	TR3793164924; 51°20′01″N 1°24′51″E		1461618	Upload Photo	Q66479994
St George's Hall	II	George Street			4 February 1988	TR3809665002; 51°20′03″N 1°25′00″E		1085410	Upload Photo	Q26372415
2, George Street	II	2, George Street, CT11 9AS			4 February 1988	TR3812065009; 51°20′03″N 1°25′01″E		1085435	Upload Photo	Q26372544
2a, George Street	II	2a, George Street			4 February 1988	TR3808864996; 51°20′03″N 1°25′00″E		1085404	Upload Photo	Q26372382
Gateway and Walls to Former Abbey School	II	Goodwin Road			4 February 1988	TR3671464467; 51°19′48″N 1°23′48″E		1338880	Upload Photo	Q26623165
The Admiral Fox	II	Grange Road			4 February 1988	TR3727165094; 51°20′07″N 1°24′18″E		1336646	Upload Photo	Q26621127
Walls and Gateways Surrounding Nos 136a and B	II	Grange Road			4 February 1988	TR3727665120; 51°20′08″N 1°24′18″E		1085412	Upload Photo	Q26372425
132, Grange Road	II	132, Grange Road			4 February 1988	TR3727665090; 51°20′07″N 1°24′18″E		1084368	Upload Photo	Q26368016
136a and 136b, Grange Road	II	136a and 136b, Grange Road			13 August 1968	TR3726265129; 51°20′09″N 1°24′17″E		1063704	Upload Photo	Q26317001
138, Grange Road	II	138, Grange Road			13 September 1974	TR3724365162; 51°20′10″N 1°24′17″E		1085413	Upload Photo	Q26372431
140, Grange Road	II	140, Grange Road			13 September 1974	TR3724565166; 51°20′10″N 1°24′17″E		1359671	Upload Photo	Q26641890
142, Grange Road	II	142, Grange Road			13 September 1974	TR3724665171; 51°20′10″N 1°24′17″E		1336647	Upload Photo	Q26621128
167, Grange Road	II	167, Grange Road			13 August 1968	TR3730365310; 51°20′14″N 1°24′20″E		1085411	Upload Photo	Q26372421
St Lawrence House	II	171, Grange Road			4 February 1988	TR3732265321; 51°20′15″N 1°24′21″E		1084360	Upload Photo	Q26368006
Hanover Cottage	II	173, Grange Road			13 August 1968	TR3731365331; 51°20′15″N 1°24′21″E		1336645	Upload Photo	Q26621126
Chapel Cottage	II	190, Grange Road			4 February 1988	TR3727565324; 51°20′15″N 1°24′19″E		1063722	Upload Photo	Q26317015
Railings and Gate about 10 Metres North of Ramsgate Library	II	Guildford Lawn			4 February 1988	TR3802864957; 51°20′02″N 1°24′57″E		1336648	Upload Photo	Q26621129
Ramsgate Library	II	Guildford Lawn			4 February 1988	TR3804864927; 51°20′01″N 1°24′58″E		1357573	Upload Photo	Q26640082
Nos 1 to 19 Inclusive With Railed Areas	II	Guildford Lawn			13 September 1974	TR3801664957; 51°20′02″N 1°24′56″E		1085414	Upload Photo	Q26372436
Barn about 50 Metres East of Ozengell Grange	II*	Haine Road			4 February 1988	TR3572365638; 51°20′27″N 1°22′59″E		1336669	Upload Photo	Q17546705
Barn at Rose Farm (tr 3590 6695)	II	Haine Road			4 February 1988	TR3589566944; 51°21′09″N 1°23′11″E		1085415	Upload Photo	Q26372441
Coachhouse about 10 Metres North West of Barn at Rose Farm	II	Haine Road			4 February 1988	TR3587866957; 51°21′10″N 1°23′10″E		1068559	Upload Photo	Q26321264
Haine Farmhouse	II	Haine Road			13 August 1968	TR3596267259; 51°21′19″N 1°23′15″E		1068554	Upload Photo	Q26321260
Ozengell Grange	II	Haine Road			13 September 1974	TR3566565654; 51°20′28″N 1°22′56″E		1085377	Upload Photo	Q26372248
Shed about 100 Metres South of Barn at Rose Farm	II	Haine Road			4 February 1988	TR3589266862; 51°21′07″N 1°23′11″E		1085376	Upload Photo	Q26372243
Custom House with Forecourt	II	Harbour Parade			13 September 1974	TR3853364792; 51°19′56″N 1°25′22″E		1068641	Upload Photo	Q26321341
Eastcliff Lift	II	Harbour Parade			1 June 2007	TR3860164841; 51°19′57″N 1°25′26″E		1391989	Upload Photo	Q26671317
National Westminster Bank	II	Harbour Parade			4 February 1988	TR3841364817; 51°19′57″N 1°25′16″E		1336670	Upload Photo	Q26621148
Pair of K6 Telephone Kiosks	II	Harbour Parade			6 January 1988	TR3858264768; 51°19′55″N 1°25′25″E		1336671	Upload Photo	Q26621149
Royal Sailors Rest	II	Harbour Parade			4 February 1988	TR3835164800; 51°19′56″N 1°25′13″E		1085378	Upload Photo	Q26372254
The Queen's Head	II	Harbour Parade			4 February 1988	TR3852164795; 51°19′56″N 1°25′22″E		1085381	Upload Photo	Q26372268
Royal Victoria Pavilion	II	Harbour Parade			13 September 1974	TR3860964766; 51°19′55″N 1°25′26″E		1336672	Upload Photo	Q31940770
Royal Oak Hotel	II	66, Harbour Parade			26 October 1978	TR3846564800; 51°19′56″N 1°25′19″E		1085379	Upload Photo	Q26372259
The Castle Hotel	II	68, Harbour Parade			26 October 1978	TR3848064794; 51°19′56″N 1°25′19″E		1085380	Upload Photo	Q26372262
Former Alexandra Hotel	II	70 and 70a, Harbour Parade			4 February 1988	TR3849364798; 51°19′56″N 1°25′20″E		1068630	Upload Photo	Q26321331
6 Harbour Street, Ramsgate	II	6, Harbour Street, CT11 8HA			28 June 2023	TR3832164919; 51°20′00″N 1°25′12″E		1484046	Upload Photo	Q126688903
15 Harbour Street, Ramsgate	II	15, Harbour Street, CT11 8HA			4 February 1988	TR3832764876; 51°19′59″N 1°25′12″E		1068668	Upload Photo	Q26321366
F Hinds	II	19 and 21, Harbour Street			4 February 1988	TR3832664862; 51°19′58″N 1°25′12″E		1356173	Upload Photo	Q26638865
29 and 31, Harbour Street	II	29 and 31, Harbour Street			4 February 1988	TR3833864829; 51°19′57″N 1°25′12″E		1085382	Upload Photo	Q26372274
Nos 2 and 4 with Areas	II	2 and 4, Hardres Street			4 February 1988	TR3819565082; 51°20′06″N 1°25′05″E		1085383	Upload Photo	Q26372279
No 3 and Railed Area	II	3, Hardres Street			4 February 1988	TR3821465073; 51°20′05″N 1°25′06″E		1068734	Upload Photo	Q26321429
No 6 with Area	II	6, Hardres Street			4 February 1988	TR3821865113; 51°20′07″N 1°25′07″E		1068681	Upload Photo	Q26321379
No 19 Wall And Rear Courtyard	II	19, Hardres Street			3 August 1976	TR3826165138; 51°20′07″N 1°25′09″E		1085388	Upload Photo	Q26372305
Nos 25 and 27 and Railed Area	II	25 and 27, Hardres Street			4 February 1988	TR3827965163; 51°20′08″N 1°25′10″E		1068712	Upload Photo	Q26321408
29, Hardres Street	II	29, Hardres Street			4 February 1988	TR3828365169; 51°20′08″N 1°25′10″E		1085387	Upload Photo	Q26372299
Nos 56 and 58 and Railed Areas	II	56 and 58, Hardres Street			4 February 1988	TR3829165217; 51°20′10″N 1°25′11″E		1085384	Upload Photo	Q26372283
Nos 60 and 62 with Railed Area	II	60 and 62, Hardres Street			4 February 1988	TR3829665225; 51°20′10″N 1°25′11″E		1085385	Upload Photo	Q26372289
No 64 and Railed Area	II	64, Hardres Street			4 February 1988	TR3830065231; 51°20′10″N 1°25′11″E		1356144	Upload Photo	Q26638837
No 72 with Railed Area	II	72, Hardres Street			4 February 1988	TR3831265248; 51°20′11″N 1°25′12″E		1085386	Upload Photo	Q26372293
80 and 82, Hardres Street	II	80 and 82, Hardres Street			4 February 1988	TR3833065274; 51°20′12″N 1°25′13″E		1356146	Upload Photo	Q26638839
Elephant and Castle	II	Hereson Road			4 February 1988	TR3851865442; 51°20′17″N 1°25′23″E		1085389	Upload Photo	Q26372310
Entrance Gates with Gatepiers to North West of the Montefiore Synagogue	II	Hereson Road			13 October 1999	TR3876165806; 51°20′28″N 1°25′36″E		1378741	Upload Photo	Q26659076
Ash House	II	18, Hereson Road			4 February 1988	TR3852865465; 51°20′18″N 1°25′24″E		1356123	Upload Photo	Q26638818
22, Hereson Road	II	22, Hereson Road			4 February 1988	TR3853665476; 51°20′18″N 1°25′24″E		1336673	Upload Photo	Q26621151
Nos 23	II	25, 27 and 29 With Railed Areas, 23, 27 and 29, Hereson Road			4 February 1988	TR3855465461; 51°20′17″N 1°25′25″E		1085390	Upload Photo	Q26372316
Nos 38 and 40 with Railed Areas	II	38 and 40, Hereson Road			4 February 1988	TR3855765505; 51°20′19″N 1°25′25″E		1068750	Upload Photo	Q26321444
Ellens Place with Railed Areas	II	5 and 7, Hibernia Street			4 February 1988	TR3842464982; 51°20′02″N 1°25′17″E		1068765	Upload Photo	Q26321460
Triple Barrel Tomb and Headstone	II	About 1 Metre North Of North Aisle Of Church Of St Laurence, High Street, St Lawrence			4 February 1988	TR3703065332; 51°20′15″N 1°24′06″E		1051675	Upload Photo	Q26303518
Free Standing Wall Monument to Maxton/holman Families	II	About 30 Metres West Of Church Of St Laurence, High Street, St Lawrence			4 February 1988	TR3699265350; 51°20′16″N 1°24′04″E		1336663	Upload Photo	Q26621142
Two Free Standing Wall Monuments and Headstone with Barrel Tomb	II	About 45 Metres North West Of Church Of St Laurence, High Street, St Lawrence			4 February 1988	TR3697865352; 51°20′16″N 1°24′03″E		1051093	Upload Photo	Q26303013
Group of 3 Chest Tombs	II	About 50 Metres West Of Church Of St Laurence, High Street, St Lawrence			4 February 1988	TR3696765316; 51°20′15″N 1°24′03″E		1085369	Upload Photo	Q26372212
Railed Tomb Chest to John Proctor Andendon	II	About 60 Metres West Of Church Of St Laurence, High Street, St Lawrence			4 February 1988	TR3695865334; 51°20′16″N 1°24′02″E		1051051	Upload Photo	Q26302972
No 126 and Railed Forecourt	II	High Street			13 September 1974	TR3796965204; 51°20′10″N 1°24′54″E		1085357	Upload Photo	Q26372145
No 127 and Walled Forecourt	II	High Street			4 February 1988	TR3799565227; 51°20′11″N 1°24′56″E		1068848	Upload Photo	Q26321542
No 154 and Forecourt	II	High Street			13 August 1968	TR3784865281; 51°20′13″N 1°24′48″E		1336638	Upload Photo	Q26621120
Tomb Chest to Captain John Curling and Group of 6 Headstones about 15-20 Metres East of Mausoleum	II	High Street			4 February 1988	TR3695865365; 51°20′17″N 1°24′02″E		1336664	Upload Photo	Q26621143
Chest Tomb about 20 Metres South of Chancel of Church of St Laurence	II	High Street, St Lawrence			4 February 1988	TR3702165300; 51°20′14″N 1°24′05″E		1085371	Upload Photo	Q26372223
Chest Tomb and 3 Headstones about 10-20 Metres North of Chancel of Church of St Laurence	II	High Street, St Lawrence			4 February 1988	TR3703765338; 51°20′16″N 1°24′06″E		1085364	Upload Photo	Q26372185
Chest Tomb of James and Mary Townley and 4 Other Railed Tomb Chests about 25 Metres North West of Church of St Laurence	II	High Street, St Lawrence			4 February 1988	TR3698065340; 51°20′16″N 1°24′03″E		1085367	Upload Photo	Q26372200
Church of St Laurence	I	High Street, St Lawrence			4 February 1988	TR3703165321; 51°20′15″N 1°24′06″E		1336662	Church of St Laurence More images	Q17530199
Free Standing Wall Monuments to Mayhew/garrett Families and Wall Monument and 5 Chest Tombs about 30 Metres South West of Church of St Laurence	II	High Street, St Lawrence			4 February 1988	TR3698465306; 51°20′15″N 1°24′04″E		1085368	Upload Photo	Q26372205
Group of 11 Brick Chest Tombs to South of Chancel of Church of St Laurence	II	High Street, St Lawrence			4 February 1988	TR3703865303; 51°20′15″N 1°24′06″E		1336666	Upload Photo	Q26621145
Group of 3 Chest Tombs about 5-15 Metres South of Chancel of Church of St Laurence	II	High Street, St Lawrence			4 February 1988	TR3702865302; 51°20′15″N 1°24′06″E		1085372	Upload Photo	Q26372228
Group of 4 Chest Tombs about 35 Metres North West of Church of St Laurence	II	High Street, St Lawrence			4 February 1988	TR3698465348; 51°20′16″N 1°24′04″E		1373888	Upload Photo	Q26654804
Group of 4 Headstones about 10-15 Metres South West of Church of St Laurence	II	High Street, St Lawrence			4 February 1988	TR3701265306; 51°20′15″N 1°24′05″E		1085361	Upload Photo	Q26372167
Group of 4 Headstones about 20 Metres North West of Church of St Laurence	II	High Street, St Lawrence			4 February 1988	TR3698965336; 51°20′16″N 1°24′04″E		1049107	Upload Photo	Q26301161
Group of 6 Headstones South of Chancel of Church of St Laurence	II	High Street, St Lawrence			4 February 1988	TR3704165299; 51°20′14″N 1°24′06″E		1372282	Upload Photo	Q26653411
Headstone to Francis Holman and Anne Grigson about 5 Metres West of Church of St Laurence	II	High Street, St Lawrence			4 February 1988	TR3701065333; 51°20′16″N 1°24′05″E		1085366	Upload Photo	Q26372195
Headstone to George Cock about 1 Metre North of North Chapel of Church of St Laurence	II	High Street, St Lawrence			4 February 1988	TR3704765332; 51°20′15″N 1°24′07″E		1085362	Upload Photo	Q26372174
Headstone with Barrel Tomb and Headstone about 10 Metres South West of Church of St Laurence	II	High Street, St Lawrence			4 February 1988	TR3701865304; 51°20′15″N 1°24′05″E		1372262	Upload Photo	Q26653390
Heastone Fixed to Churchyard Wall about 25 Metres South of Church of St Laurence	II	High Street, St Lawrence			4 February 1988	TR3700265297; 51°20′14″N 1°24′04″E		1336665	Upload Photo	Q26621144
Mausoleum to Earl of Dunmow with 2 Tomb Chests and Headstone about 100 Metres West of Church of St Laurence	II	High Street, St Lawrence			4 February 1988	TR3693965364; 51°20′17″N 1°24′01″E		1372893	Upload Photo	Q26653940
Railed Chest Tomb and 2 Wall Plaques about 25 Metres North East of Church of St Laurence	II	High Street, St Lawrence			4 February 1988	TR3705165348; 51°20′16″N 1°24′07″E		1085363	Upload Photo	Q26372179
Railed Monument to Dick Family and Adjacent Railed Chest Tomb about 100 Metres South West of Church of St Laurence	II	High Street, St Lawrence			4 February 1988	TR3692665327; 51°20′15″N 1°24′01″E		1085370	Upload Photo	Q26372216
Railed Tomb and Headstone about 40 Metres North of Church of St Laurence	II	High Street, St Lawrence			4 February 1988	TR3703565347; 51°20′16″N 1°24′06″E		1373848	Upload Photo	Q26654767
Three Headstones about 10 Metres North of North Aisle of Church of St Laurence	II	High Street, St Lawrence			4 February 1988	TR3703365341; 51°20′16″N 1°24′06″E		1085365	Upload Photo	Q26372190
Two Chest Tombs about 10 and 25 Metres South of Church of St Laurence	II	High Street, St Lawrence			4 February 1988	TR3702765304; 51°20′15″N 1°24′06″E		1052341	Upload Photo	Q26304128
Two Headstones about 10 Metres North East of Church of St Laurence	II	High Street, St Lawrence			4 February 1988	TR3704865340; 51°20′16″N 1°24′07″E		1076958	Upload Photo	Q26342948
Group of Chest Tomb and 4 Headstones to Long Family	II	Within 2 Metres North Of Church Of St Laurence, High Street, St Lawrence			4 February 1988	TR3703565333; 51°20′16″N 1°24′06″E		1051661	Upload Photo	Q26303505
1 and 3, High Street	II	1 and 3, High Street, St Lawrence			13 August 1968	TR3713765366; 51°20′16″N 1°24′12″E		1336661	Upload Photo	Q26621141
Former Midland Bank	II	1-3, High Street, CT11 9AD			3 August 2023	TR3830564951; 51°20′01″N 1°25′11″E		1484045	Upload Photo	Q126486439
Penistone House	II	5, High Street, St Lawrence			4 February 1988	TR3710965368; 51°20′17″N 1°24′10″E		1085360	Upload Photo	Q26372163
Rochester Lodge	II	22, High Street, St Lawrence			13 September 1974	TR3720665347; 51°20′16″N 1°24′15″E		1372626	Upload Photo	Q26653725
39, 41, 43 and 45, High Street	II	39, 41, 43 and 45, High Street, St Lawrence			17 October 1970	TR3697965228; 51°20′12″N 1°24′03″E		1085373	Upload Photo	Q26372234
51a, High Street	II	51a, High Street			13 August 1968	TR3820665065; 51°20′05″N 1°25′06″E		1336674	Upload Photo	Q26621152
53 High Street, Ramsgate	II	53, High Street, CT11 9AG			22 May 2019	TR3818765070; 51°20′05″N 1°25′05″E		1461895	Upload Photo	Q66480010
70, High Street	II	70, High Street			4 February 1988	TR3813165085; 51°20′06″N 1°25′02″E		1085359	Upload Photo	Q26372157
Freemasons Tavern	II	71, High Street			4 February 1988	TR3815265104; 51°20′06″N 1°25′03″E		1068838	Upload Photo	Q26321531
72, High Street	II	72, High Street			4 February 1988	TR3812665091; 51°20′06″N 1°25′02″E		1085358	Upload Photo	Q26372151
Rose of England	II	97, High Street			4 February 1988	TR3809165170; 51°20′09″N 1°25′00″E		1085391	Upload Photo	Q26372322
124, High Street	II*	124, High Street			4 February 1988	TR3799165205; 51°20′10″N 1°24′55″E		1336660	Upload Photo	Q17546699
The Old House and Walled Forecourt	II*	125, High Street			4 February 1988	TR3800465224; 51°20′11″N 1°24′56″E		1085392	Upload Photo	Q17546626
129, 131, 133 and 135, High Street	II	129, 131, 133 and 135, High Street			9 October 1970	TR3798465235; 51°20′11″N 1°24′55″E		1336637	Upload Photo	Q26621119
Oddfellows Hall	II	142, High Street			4 February 1988	TR3791465247; 51°20′11″N 1°24′51″E		1085356	Upload Photo	Q26372138
144, High Street	II	144, High Street			4 February 1988	TR3790865254; 51°20′12″N 1°24′51″E		1343664	Upload Photo	Q26627447
148 and 150, High Street	II	148 and 150, High Street			4 February 1988	TR3786865270; 51°20′12″N 1°24′49″E		1085394	Upload Photo	Q26372332
152, High Street	II	152, High Street			4 February 1988	TR3785865271; 51°20′12″N 1°24′49″E		1068884	Upload Photo	Q26321576
The Eagle Inn	II	153, High Street			4 February 1988	TR3793665283; 51°20′13″N 1°24′53″E		1068870	Upload Photo	Q26321564
The Cottage	II	156, High Street			13 August 1968	TR3784565282; 51°20′13″N 1°24′48″E		1068876	Upload Photo	Q26321568
The Sylvan Hotel	II	162, High Street			4 February 1988	TR3781365291; 51°20′13″N 1°24′46″E		1085393	Upload Photo	Q26372328
Gentlemans Toilet at Montefiore Synagogue and Mausoleum	II	Honeysuckle Road			10 September 2003	TR3883165728; 51°20′26″N 1°25′40″E		1390615	Upload Photo	Q26670003
Honeysuckle Inn	II	Honeysuckle Road			4 February 1988	TR3872365655; 51°20′23″N 1°25′34″E		1336667	Upload Photo	Q26621146
Mausoleum of Sir Moses and Lady Judith Montefiore	II*	Honeysuckle Road			13 August 1968	TR3884165747; 51°20′26″N 1°25′40″E		1085375	Upload Photo	Q17546622
Synagogue and Adjacent Outbuilding	II*	Honeysuckle Road			13 August 1968	TR3883865734; 51°20′26″N 1°25′40″E		1051632	Upload Photo	Q6905067
4 and 6, Honeysuckle Road	II	4 and 6, Honeysuckle Road			13 September 1974	TR3872565635; 51°20′23″N 1°25′34″E		1085374	Upload Photo	Q26372239
17, Hope's Lane	II	17, Hope's Lane			4 February 1988	TR3719367108; 51°21′13″N 1°24′19″E		1372270	Upload Photo	Q26653399
Nos 1 to 6 with Railed Areas	II	1-6, Kent Terrace			13 September 1974	TR3855264808; 51°19′56″N 1°25′23″E		1336668	Upload Photo	Q26621147
Nos 10 to 14 with Railed Area	II	10-14, Kent Terrace			13 September 1974	TR3857464844; 51°19′57″N 1°25′24″E		1052310	Upload Photo	Q26304097
Gates and Quadrant Walls Attached to King George VI Memorial Garden	II	King George VI Memorial Garden			4 February 1988	TR3921266030; 51°20′35″N 1°26′00″E		1336689	Upload Photo	Q26621167
Battlemented Courtyard with Towers and Internal Wall	II	King George VI Memorial Park			15 February 1973	TR3925766041; 51°20′35″N 1°26′03″E		1085337	Upload Photo	Q26372029
Conservatory and Wall to Which It Is Attached	II*	King George VI Memorial Park			15 February 1973	TR3923766037; 51°20′35″N 1°26′02″E		1085336	Upload Photo	Q17546616
Gate House and Walls Attached	II	King George VI Memorial Park			13 September 1974	TR3921766030; 51°20′35″N 1°26′00″E		1085338	Upload Photo	Q26372035
Nos 1 and 2 and Wall	II	1 and 2, King George VI Memorial Park			13 September 1974	TR3922266040; 51°20′35″N 1°26′01″E		1336688	Upload Photo	Q26621166
The Red Lion	II	1, King Street			13 September 1974	TR3833164934; 51°20′01″N 1°25′12″E		1085339	Upload Photo	Q26372041
The Deal Cutter	II	44, King Street			4 February 1988	TR3838065083; 51°20′05″N 1°25′15″E		1085342	Upload Photo	Q26372057
Chatham Arms	II	56 and 58, King Street			4 February 1988	TR3840265118; 51°20′06″N 1°25′16″E		1085341	Upload Photo	Q26372050
85 and 87, King Street	II	85 and 87, King Street			4 February 1988	TR3846565194; 51°20′09″N 1°25′20″E		1085340	Upload Photo	Q26372046
Earl St Vincent	II	99 and 101, King Street			4 February 1988	TR3846465192; 51°20′09″N 1°25′20″E		1336690	Upload Photo	Q26621168
4, 5 and 6, La Belle Alliance Square	II	4, 5 and 6, La Belle Alliance Square			21 September 1984	TR3847665068; 51°20′05″N 1°25′20″E		1367116	Upload Photo	Q26648643
10, 11 and 12, La Belle Alliance Square	II	10, 11 and 12, La Belle Alliance Square			21 September 1984	TR3849465093; 51°20′06″N 1°25′21″E		1085343	Upload Photo	Q26372063
The Camden Arms	II	13, La Belle Alliance Square			11 July 1978	TR3850865085; 51°20′05″N 1°25′22″E		1054011	Upload Photo	Q26305697
14 and 15, La Belle Alliance Square	II	14 and 15, La Belle Alliance Square			11 July 1978	TR3851765080; 51°20′05″N 1°25′22″E		1085344	Upload Photo	Q26372069
Nos 1-19 Inclusive With Railed Areas	II	1-19, Liverpool Lawn			13 August 1968	TR3810464639; 51°19′51″N 1°25′00″E		1054018	Upload Photo	Q26305705
20, 21 and 22, Liverpool Lawn	II	20, 21 and 22, Liverpool Lawn			13 August 1968	TR3804764706; 51°19′54″N 1°24′57″E		1085345	Upload Photo	Q26372075
Grace Cottage	II	23, Liverpool Lawn			13 August 1968	TR3807664710; 51°19′54″N 1°24′58″E		1054046	Upload Photo	Q26305729
24-33, Liverpool Lawn	II	24-33, Liverpool Lawn			13 August 1968	TR3807764702; 51°19′54″N 1°24′58″E		1085346	Upload Photo	Q26372081
Liverpool House	II	35, Liverpool Lawn			13 August 1968	TR3809964663; 51°19′52″N 1°25′00″E		1367450	Upload Photo	Q26648951
Bon Secours Nursing Home	II	London Road			5 November 1974	TR3710464340; 51°19′43″N 1°24′07″E		1085347	Upload Photo	Q26372086
The Lodge and Courtyard Bon Secours Nursing Home	II	London Road			5 November 1974	TR3715264371; 51°19′44″N 1°24′10″E		1367425	Upload Photo	Q26648929
Memorial to the Great War	II	Madeira Walk			4 February 1988	TR3849264841; 51°19′57″N 1°25′20″E		1085348	Upload Photo	Q26372091
Rock Gardens and Cascade	II	Madeira Walk			4 February 1988	TR3846364843; 51°19′58″N 1°25′19″E		1336691	Upload Photo	Q26621169
Office Block, Retaining Walls At Flour Mills	II	Margate Road			4 February 1988	TR3781165651; 51°20′25″N 1°24′47″E		1085349	Upload Photo	Q26372096
Rank Hovis Flour Mills	II	Margate Road			4 February 1988	TR3780965634; 51°20′24″N 1°24′47″E		1298860	Upload Photo	Q26586303
Former Congregational Church	II	Meeting Street			4 February 1988	TR3804265049; 51°20′05″N 1°24′58″E		1336692	Upload Photo	Q26621170
Foresters Hall	II	Meeting Street, CT11 9RT			4 February 1988	TR3806465086; 51°20′06″N 1°24′59″E		1040072	Upload Photo	Q26291877
33 and 35, Meeting Street	II	33 and 35, Meeting Street			29 January 1974	TR3806165044; 51°20′05″N 1°24′58″E		1040024	Upload Photo	Q26291827
Jacob's Ladder	II	Military Road, Royal Harbour			30 October 1985	TR3810664506; 51°19′47″N 1°25′00″E		1031336	Upload Photo	Q26282694
Sailors' Church and Former Sailors' Home	II	Military Road, Royal Harbour			30 October 1985	TR3812864526; 51°19′48″N 1°25′01″E		1086091	Upload Photo	Q26375719
No 1 and Railed Area	II	1, Nelson Crescent			3 October 1977	TR3811564598; 51°19′50″N 1°25′00″E		1085350	Upload Photo	Q26372102
No 2 and Railed Area	II	2, Nelson Crescent			3 October 1977	TR3811064593; 51°19′50″N 1°25′00″E		1040032	Upload Photo	Q26291836
No 3 and Railed Area	II	3, Nelson Crescent			3 October 1977	TR3810564588; 51°19′50″N 1°25′00″E		1336693	Upload Photo	Q26685012
No 4 and Railed Area	II	4, Nelson Crescent			3 October 1977	TR3810064583; 51°19′50″N 1°24′59″E		1040040	Upload Photo	Q26291844
No 5 and Railed Area	II	5, Nelson Crescent			3 October 1977	TR3809664578; 51°19′50″N 1°24′59″E		1085351	Upload Photo	Q26372109
No 6 and Railed Area	II	6, Nelson Crescent			3 October 1977	TR3809164573; 51°19′49″N 1°24′59″E		1040007	Upload Photo	Q26291812
No 7 and Railed Area	II	7, Nelson Crescent			3 October 1977	TR3808764567; 51°19′49″N 1°24′59″E		1085352	Upload Photo	Q26372115
No 8 and Railed Area	II	8, Nelson Crescent			3 October 1977	TR3808364562; 51°19′49″N 1°24′58″E		1040020	Upload Photo	Q26291823
No 9 and Railed Area	II	9, Nelson Crescent			3 October 1977	TR3807964557; 51°19′49″N 1°24′58″E		1336656	Upload Photo	Q26621137
Nos 10 and 11 and Railed Area	II	10 and 11, Nelson Crescent			3 October 1977	TR3807664548; 51°19′49″N 1°24′58″E		1085353	Upload Photo	Q26372121
No 12 and Railed Area	II	12, Nelson Crescent			3 October 1977	TR3807264540; 51°19′48″N 1°24′58″E		1045927	Upload Photo	Q26298038
No 13 and Railed Area	II	13, Nelson Crescent			3 October 1977	TR3806564538; 51°19′48″N 1°24′57″E		1336657	Upload Photo	Q26621138
No 14 and Railed Area	II	14, Nelson Crescent			3 October 1977	TR3806364532; 51°19′48″N 1°24′57″E		1045892	Upload Photo	Q26298001
No 15 and Railed Area	II	15, Nelson Crescent			3 October 1977	TR3806064526; 51°19′48″N 1°24′57″E		1085354	Upload Photo	Q26372126
No 16 and Railed Area	II	16, Nelson Crescent			3 October 1977	TR3805764521; 51°19′48″N 1°24′57″E		1370023	Upload Photo	Q26651286
No 17 and Railed Area	II	17, Nelson Crescent			3 October 1977	TR3805464516; 51°19′48″N 1°24′57″E		1085355	Upload Photo	Q26372134
No 18 and Railed Area	II	18, Nelson Crescent			3 October 1977	TR3805264511; 51°19′47″N 1°24′57″E		1045908	Upload Photo	Q26298020
Lower Lodge	II	Nethercourt Hill			4 February 1988	TR3653064914; 51°20′03″N 1°23′39″E		1336658	Upload Photo	Q26621139
Upper Lodge	II	Nethercourt Hill			4 February 1988	TR3675164973; 51°20′04″N 1°23′51″E		1045840	Upload Photo	Q26297949
3 and 5, Paradise	II	3 and 5, Paradise			4 February 1988	TR3788965228; 51°20′11″N 1°24′50″E		1370064	Upload Photo	Q26651323
7, 9 and 11, Paradise	II	7, 9 and 11, Paradise			4 February 1988	TR3788065211; 51°20′10″N 1°24′50″E		1336659	Upload Photo	Q26621140
2, Paragon Street	II	2, Paragon Street			4 February 1988	TR3802564501; 51°19′47″N 1°24′55″E		1085324	Upload Photo	Q26371959
20, Paragon Street	II	20, Paragon Street			4 February 1988	TR3796364452; 51°19′46″N 1°24′52″E		1367070	Upload Photo	Q26648603
3, Park Road	II	3, Park Road			13 August 1968	TR3777365485; 51°20′19″N 1°24′45″E		1085325	Upload Photo	Q26371965
5, Park Road	II	5, Park Road			13 August 1968	TR3775765482; 51°20′19″N 1°24′44″E		1054787	Upload Photo	Q26306440
7, Park Road	II	7, Park Road			13 August 1968	TR3774265481; 51°20′19″N 1°24′43″E		1085326	Upload Photo	Q26371972
54 and 56, Park Road	II	54 and 56, Park Road			4 February 1988	TR3736865398; 51°20′17″N 1°24′24″E		1054768	Upload Photo	Q26306423
64 and 64a, Park Road	II	64 and 64a, Park Road			4 February 1988	TR3733765391; 51°20′17″N 1°24′22″E		1336681	Upload Photo	Q26621159
66, 68 and 70, Park Road	II	66, 68 and 70, Park Road, CT11 9TJ			13 September 1974	TR3732465388; 51°20′17″N 1°24′21″E		1054771	Upload Photo	Q26306425
K6 Telephone Kiosk	II	Pegwell Road			6 January 1988	TR3633164199; 51°19′40″N 1°23′27″E		1085328	Upload Photo	Q26371983
Pegwell Inn	II	Pegwell Road			4 February 1988	TR3636064138; 51°19′38″N 1°23′29″E		1055833	Upload Photo	Q26307455
Pegwell Lodge	II	Pegwell Road			13 September 1974	TR3644964122; 51°19′37″N 1°23′33″E		1366578	Upload Photo	Q26648166
Pegwell Village Hotel	II	Pegwell Road			4 February 1988	TR3636064160; 51°19′39″N 1°23′29″E		1336683	Upload Photo	Q26621161
The Belle Vue Tavern and Attached Block	II	Pegwell Road			4 February 1988	TR3637964133; 51°19′38″N 1°23′30″E		1085329	Upload Photo	Q26371989
Wall and Gate Piers to North and East of West Cliff Terrace	II	Pegwell Road			4 February 1988	TR3678464311; 51°19′43″N 1°23′51″E		1336682	Upload Photo	Q26621160
Nos 1-23 West Cliff Terrace Inclusive With Terracing To South	II	1-23, Pegwell Road			13 August 1968	TR3677864279; 51°19′42″N 1°23′50″E		1055848	Upload Photo	Q26307471
The Lodge	II	2, Pegwell Road			4 February 1988	TR3704664379; 51°19′45″N 1°24′05″E		1085327	Upload Photo	Q26371977
65 and 67, Pegwell Road	II	65 and 67, Pegwell Road			13 September 1974	TR3641064148; 51°19′38″N 1°23′31″E		1055810	Upload Photo	Q26307431
65a, Pegwell Road	II	65a, Pegwell Road			13 September 1974	TR3642064150; 51°19′38″N 1°23′32″E		1085330	Upload Photo	Q26371995
No 1 and Railed Area	II	1, Priory Road			4 February 1988	TR3781464459; 51°19′46″N 1°24′44″E		1086081	Upload Photo	Q26375670
The Old Coach House	II	3, Priory Road			4 February 1988	TR3781064468; 51°19′46″N 1°24′44″E		1086082	Upload Photo	Q26375674
1-7 Queen Street, Ramsgate	II	1-7, Queen Street, CT11 9DL			4 February 1988	TR3827464932; 51°20′01″N 1°25′09″E		1086083	Upload Photo	Q26375679
47 and 49, Queen Street	II	47 and 49, Queen Street			4 February 1988	TR3817664864; 51°19′59″N 1°25′04″E		1086084	Upload Photo	Q26375684
51, Queen Street	II	51, Queen Street, CT11 9EJ			22 May 2019	TR3816764855; 51°19′58″N 1°25′04″E		1460979	Upload Photo	Q64029198
1 and 2, Queens Court	II	1 and 2, Queens Court			13 August 1968	TR3822564911; 51°20′00″N 1°25′07″E		1086085	Upload Photo	Q26375688
3, Rose Hill	II	3, Rose Hill			4 February 1988	TR3816664724; 51°19′54″N 1°25′03″E		1345593	Upload Photo	Q26629204
5, Rose Hill	II	5, Rose Hill			4 February 1988	TR3815664734; 51°19′54″N 1°25′03″E		1086086	Upload Photo	Q26375694
Former Regency Hotel	II	Royal Crescent			4 February 1988	TR3779864395; 51°19′44″N 1°24′43″E		1086093	Upload Photo	Q26375730
Bowls Pavilion	II	Royal Esplanade			4 February 1988	TR3721664194; 51°19′38″N 1°24′13″E		1086087	Upload Photo	Q26375699
Croquet Pavilion	II	Royal Esplanade			4 February 1988	TR3734264221; 51°19′39″N 1°24′19″E		1374398	Upload Photo	Q26655278
The Lido, Boating Pond And Retaining Walls	II	Royal Esplanade			4 February 1988	TR3711364172; 51°19′38″N 1°24′07″E		1057651	Upload Photo	Q26309822
Former Smack Boys' Home	II	Royal Harbour			30 October 1985	TR3813864544; 51°19′48″N 1°25′01″E		1376868	Upload Photo	Q26657378
Lighthouse on West Pier	II	Royal Harbour			30 October 1985	TR3846164290; 51°19′40″N 1°25′17″E		1086089	Upload Photo	Q26375708
The Clock House	II*	Royal Harbour			4 February 1988	TR3850764715; 51°19′53″N 1°25′21″E		1336325	Upload Photo	Q17546688
The Obelisk	II	Royal Harbour			4 February 1988	TR3857564756; 51°19′55″N 1°25′24″E		1086090	Upload Photo	Q26375714
Terracing, balustrades and arcades to Royal Parade	II	Royal Parade			4 February 1988	TR3820364688; 51°19′53″N 1°25′05″E		1336326	Upload Photo	Q26620821
1 and 3, Royal Road	II	1 and 3, Royal Road			13 August 1968	TR3786364533; 51°19′48″N 1°24′47″E		1025882	Upload Photo	Q26276811
Nos 5, 7 and 9 Including Railed Areas And Gardens	II	5, 7 and 9, Royal Road			4 February 1988	TR3785564543; 51°19′49″N 1°24′47″E		1086092	Upload Photo	Q26375724
Nos 11, 13, 15 and 17 With Railed Areas	II	11, 15 and 17, Royal Road			4 February 1988	TR3784364560; 51°19′49″N 1°24′46″E		1025852	Upload Photo	Q26276784
Group of 4 Cannon and Tideball Post	II	Sion Hill			4 February 1988	TR3817664648; 51°19′52″N 1°25′03″E		1086097	Upload Photo	Q26375746
Chest Tomb to Thomas Tomson and Headstone to Anne Tomson	II	South Of Church Of St Laurence, High Street, St Lawrence			4 February 1988	TR3703165304; 51°20′15″N 1°24′06″E		1372252	Upload Photo	Q26653380
Powder Magazine and walls	II	South-west End of Harbour Cross Wall			30 October 1985	TR3819064441; 51°19′45″N 1°25′04″E		1376681	Upload Photo	Q26657212
Water Tower of Ramsgate Water Works Including Area Railings, Gate Piers To West	II	Southwood Road			4 February 1988	TR3714864891; 51°20′01″N 1°24′11″E		1203415	Upload Photo	Q26498952
Gate and Gatepiers about 20 Metres West of Nos 1 and 2	II	Spencer Square			4 February 1988	TR3791864449; 51°19′46″N 1°24′50″E		1203426	Upload Photo	Q26498962
St Benet's	II	1 and 2, Spencer Square			4 February 1988	TR3794364468; 51°19′46″N 1°24′51″E		1336330	Upload Photo	Q26620825
3-13, Spencer Square	II	3-13, Spencer Square			13 August 1968	TR3798964502; 51°19′47″N 1°24′53″E		1086098	Upload Photo	Q26375750
Nos 14 to 29 Inclusive with Railed Areas	II	14-29, Spencer Square			13 August 1968	TR3798764517; 51°19′48″N 1°24′53″E		1086056	Upload Photo	Q26375543
Nos 30-34 Inclusive with Railed Areas	II	30-34, Spencer Square			13 August 1968	TR3792864567; 51°19′49″N 1°24′50″E		1336348	Upload Photo	Q26620843
Nos 35	II	36 and 37 And Railed Areas, 35, 36 and 37, Spencer Square			13 August 1968	TR3790564550; 51°19′49″N 1°24′49″E		1086057	Upload Photo	Q26375547
Nos 38 and 39 and Railed Areas	II	38 and 39, Spencer Square			13 August 1968	TR3788964539; 51°19′49″N 1°24′48″E		1086058	Upload Photo	Q26375552
Churchill House School with Railed Area	II	40, 41 and 42, Spencer Square			13 August 1968	TR3786664523; 51°19′48″N 1°24′47″E		1086059	Upload Photo	Q26375557
Chartham Terrace and Garden Wall to Right	II	St Augustine's Road			13 August 1968	TR3770764336; 51°19′42″N 1°24′39″E		1336328	Upload Photo	Q26620823
Church of St Augustine of England (roman Catholic) with Cloisters Attached	I	St Augustine's Road			4 February 1988	TR3766864329; 51°19′42″N 1°24′36″E		1281779	Church of St Augustine of England (roman Catholic) with Cloisters Attached More images	Q17530195
St Augustine's Abbey with Perimeter Wall	II	St Augustine's Road			23 June 1986	TR3763364351; 51°19′43″N 1°24′35″E		1281732	Upload Photo	Q15979312
St Edwards	I	St Augustine's Road			23 June 1986	TR3764364332; 51°19′42″N 1°24′35″E		1086095	St Edwards More images	Q17530172
The Grange	I	St Augustine's Road			13 August 1968	TR3764464311; 51°19′42″N 1°24′35″E		1203285	The Grange More images	Q12058982
West Cliff Lodge	II	St Augustine's Road			4 February 1988	TR3774564354; 51°19′43″N 1°24′41″E		1203233	Upload Photo	Q26498785
White Cliffs and Adjacent Walls and Outbuildings North of West Cliff Lodge	II	St Augustine's Road			4 February 1988	TR3771964374; 51°19′43″N 1°24′39″E		1086094	Upload Photo	Q26375734
Carriage Gates and Gate Piers, Walls And West Wicket Gate, The Grange, Without House	II	St Augustine's Road			23 June 1986	TR3762764334; 51°19′42″N 1°24′34″E		1336329	Upload Photo	Q26620824
Nos 3 and 4 and Railed Areas	II	3 and 4, St Augustine's Road			4 February 1988	TR3782864448; 51°19′46″N 1°24′45″E		1281691	Upload Photo	Q26570711
Nos 5 and 6 with Railed Areas	II	5 and 6, St Augustine's Road			4 February 1988	TR3783764452; 51°19′46″N 1°24′46″E		1086096	Upload Photo	Q26375741
7, St Augustine's Road	II	7, St Augustine's Road			4 February 1988	TR3783564509; 51°19′48″N 1°24′46″E		1025310	Upload Photo	Q26276173
The Churchyard	II	St George's Church, Church Hill, CT11 8RA			5 February 2016	TR3814665187; 51°20′09″N 1°25′03″E		1432603	Upload Photo	Q26677839
Chapel and Library	II	St Lawrence College, College Road			4 August 1999	TR3790065965; 51°20′35″N 1°24′52″E		1388303	Upload Photo	Q26667859
Ramsgate Station (British Rail)	II	Station Approach Road			4 February 1988	TR3732565718; 51°20′28″N 1°24′22″E		1086060	Upload Photo	Q1897319
The Lazarus Hart Havens of Rest	II	1-10, Thanet Road			4 February 1988	TR3871565546; 51°20′20″N 1°25′33″E		1086061	Upload Photo	Q26375568
K6 Telephone Kiosk	II	The Paragon			3 February 2004	TR3790764431; 51°19′45″N 1°24′49″E		1390736	Upload Photo	Q26688355
No 1 and Railed Area	II	1, The Paragon			13 September 1974	TR3804464487; 51°19′47″N 1°24′56″E		1085316	No 1 and Railed Area More images	Q26371914
No 2 and Railed Area	II	2, The Paragon			13 September 1974	TR3804064482; 51°19′46″N 1°24′56″E		1336678	No 2 and Railed Area More images	Q26893501
No 3 and Railed Area	II	3, The Paragon			4 February 1988	TR3803264480; 51°19′46″N 1°24′56″E		1085317	No 3 and Railed Area More images	Q26371919
No 4 and Railed Area	II	4, The Paragon			13 September 1974	TR3802864475; 51°19′46″N 1°24′55″E		1085318	No 4 and Railed Area More images	Q26371925
No 5 and Railed Area	II	5, The Paragon			13 September 1974	TR3802564470; 51°19′46″N 1°24′55″E		1336679	No 5 and Railed Area More images	Q26685008
No 7 and Railed Area	II	7, The Paragon			4 February 1988	TR3801664463; 51°19′46″N 1°24′55″E		1085319	Upload Photo	Q26371930
No 8 and Railed Area	II	8, The Paragon			13 September 1974	TR3801264460; 51°19′46″N 1°24′55″E		1336680	No 8 and Railed Area More images	Q26685010
No 10 and Railed Area	II	10, The Paragon			13 September 1974	TR3800364453; 51°19′46″N 1°24′54″E		1085320	No 10 and Railed Area More images	Q26371937
No 11 and Railed Area	II	11, The Paragon			13 September 1974	TR3799764453; 51°19′46″N 1°24′54″E		1085321	No 11 and Railed Area More images	Q26371941
No 14 and Railed Area	II	14, The Paragon			4 February 1988	TR3798364440; 51°19′45″N 1°24′53″E		1054838	No 14 and Railed Area More images	Q26306491
No 15 and Railed Area	II	15, The Paragon			4 February 1988	TR3797864437; 51°19′45″N 1°24′53″E		1085322	No 15 and Railed Area More images	Q26371948
Nos 17-22 Inclusive With Railed Areas	II	17-22, The Paragon			4 February 1988	TR3796664426; 51°19′45″N 1°24′52″E		1085323	Nos 17-22 Inclusive With Railed Areas More images	Q26371953
Nos 23 and 24 with Railed Areas	II	23 and 24, The Paragon			4 February 1988	TR3793464439; 51°19′45″N 1°24′50″E		1367105	Upload Photo	Q26648634
Nos 49 and 51 with Railed Areas	II	49 and 51, The Plains Of Waterloo			21 September 1984	TR3856365060; 51°20′04″N 1°25′24″E		1055817	Upload Photo	Q26307438
Admiral House	II	50, The Plains Of Waterloo			4 February 1988	TR3858365084; 51°20′05″N 1°25′26″E		1336686	Upload Photo	Q26621164
No 52 and Railed Area	II	52, The Plains Of Waterloo			13 August 1968	TR3859265061; 51°20′04″N 1°25′26″E		1366653	Upload Photo	Q26648235
53, The Plains of Waterloo	II	53, The Plains Of Waterloo			4 February 1988	TR3856765055; 51°20′04″N 1°25′25″E		1085331	Upload Photo	Q26372000
54, The Plains of Waterloo	II	54, The Plains Of Waterloo			4 February 1988	TR3859565056; 51°20′04″N 1°25′26″E		1085335	Upload Photo	Q26372023
No 55 and Railed Area	II	55, The Plains Of Waterloo			4 February 1988	TR3856965052; 51°20′04″N 1°25′25″E		1055785	Upload Photo	Q26307406
56, The Plains of Waterloo	II	56, The Plains Of Waterloo			4 February 1988	TR3859865052; 51°20′04″N 1°25′26″E		1336687	Upload Photo	Q26621165
No 57 and Railed Area	II	57, The Plains Of Waterloo			4 February 1988	TR3857165047; 51°20′04″N 1°25′25″E		1336684	Upload Photo	Q26621162
58, The Plains of Waterloo	II	58, The Plains Of Waterloo			4 February 1988	TR3860165048; 51°20′04″N 1°25′26″E		1055740	Upload Photo	Q26309488
59 and 61, The Plains of Waterloo	II	59 and 61, The Plains Of Waterloo			21 September 1984	TR3857465043; 51°20′04″N 1°25′25″E		1085332	Upload Photo	Q26372004
No 60 and Railed Area	II	60, The Plains Of Waterloo			4 February 1988	TR3860465043; 51°20′04″N 1°25′26″E		1336321	Upload Photo	Q26620818
62, The Plains of Waterloo	II	62, The Plains Of Waterloo			4 February 1988	TR3860665038; 51°20′04″N 1°25′27″E		1086078	Upload Photo	Q26375655
Nos 63 and 65 and Railed Areas	II	63 and 65, The Plains Of Waterloo			21 September 1984	TR3858065034; 51°20′04″N 1°25′25″E		1055778	Upload Photo	Q26307399
64, The Plains of Waterloo	II	64, The Plains Of Waterloo			4 February 1988	TR3861065035; 51°20′04″N 1°25′27″E		1086079	Upload Photo	Q26375658
No 66 and Railed Area	II	66, The Plains Of Waterloo			4 February 1988	TR3861265030; 51°20′03″N 1°25′27″E		1336322	Upload Photo	Q26620819
No 67 and Railed Area	II	67, The Plains Of Waterloo			21 September 1984	TR3858465025; 51°20′03″N 1°25′25″E		1336685	Upload Photo	Q26621163
Nos 68 and 70 and Railed Areas	II	68 and 70, The Plains Of Waterloo			4 February 1988	TR3861665022; 51°20′03″N 1°25′27″E		1086080	Upload Photo	Q26375664
No 69 and Railed Area	II	69, The Plains Of Waterloo			21 September 1984	TR3858665020; 51°20′03″N 1°25′26″E		1366621	Upload Photo	Q26648202
Nos 71 to 77 and Railed Areas	II	71-77, The Plains Of Waterloo			21 September 1984	TR3858865017; 51°20′03″N 1°25′26″E		1085333	Upload Photo	Q26372011
72, The Plains of Waterloo	II	72, The Plains Of Waterloo			4 February 1988	TR3861965018; 51°20′03″N 1°25′27″E		1055722	Upload Photo	Q26309470
79, The Plains of Waterloo	II	79, The Plains Of Waterloo			4 February 1988	TR3859964999; 51°20′02″N 1°25′26″E		1085334	Upload Photo	Q26372018
No 81 and Railed Forecourt	II	81, The Plains Of Waterloo			4 February 1988	TR3859564996; 51°20′02″N 1°25′26″E		1366651	Upload Photo	Q26648233
No 52 and Railed Forecourt	II	Upper Dumpton Park Road			4 February 1988	TR3813965586; 51°20′22″N 1°25′04″E		1086063	Upload Photo	Q26375578
Nos 34 and 36 and Railed Forecourt	II	Upper Dumpton Park Road			4 February 1988	TR3812765554; 51°20′21″N 1°25′03″E		1086062	Upload Photo	Q26375572
Castle Cottage	II	Upper Dumpton Park Road, CT11 7PD			22 May 2019	TR3807465489; 51°20′19″N 1°25′00″E		1461401	Upload Photo	Q66479987
Christ Church	II	Vale Square			4 February 1988	TR3768364689; 51°19′54″N 1°24′38″E		1086069	Upload Photo	Q26375609
Stable and Coachhouse about 20 Metres North East of No 20	II	Vale Square			4 February 1988	TR3775064764; 51°19′56″N 1°24′42″E		1086067	Upload Photo	Q26375599
Nos 1-9 Inclusive With Railed Areas And Gardens With Railed Areas And Gardens	II	1-9, Vale Square			21 September 1984	TR3790064754; 51°19′55″N 1°24′49″E		1203491	Upload Photo	Q26499022
The Hermitage	II	12, Vale Square			16 October 1973	TR3787364803; 51°19′57″N 1°24′48″E		1086064	Upload Photo	Q26375584
Royal Villa	II	13, Vale Square			4 February 1988	TR3784164799; 51°19′57″N 1°24′47″E		1086065	Upload Photo	Q26375588
Chandos Cottage	II	14, Vale Square			4 February 1988	TR3783664795; 51°19′57″N 1°24′46″E		1281661	Upload Photo	Q26570685
15, Vale Square	II	15, Vale Square			13 August 1968	TR3781764785; 51°19′57″N 1°24′45″E		1336349	Upload Photo	Q26620844
16 and 17, Vale Square	II	16 and 17, Vale Square			13 August 1968	TR3779064779; 51°19′56″N 1°24′44″E		1203509	Upload Photo	Q26499037
18 and 19, Vale Square	II	18 and 19, Vale Square			13 August 1968	TR3776464766; 51°19′56″N 1°24′43″E		1086066	Upload Photo	Q26375593
Clanmire House	II	20, Vale Square			13 August 1968	TR3773664755; 51°19′56″N 1°24′41″E		1281666	Upload Photo	Q26570690
Brenan House	II	21, Vale Square			13 September 1974	TR3769864740; 51°19′55″N 1°24′39″E		1203515	Upload Photo	Q26499042
43 and 44, Vale Square	II	43 and 44, Vale Square			4 February 1988	TR3778664684; 51°19′53″N 1°24′43″E		1336350	Upload Photo	Q26620845
45 and 46, Vale Square	II	45 and 46, Vale Square			4 February 1988	TR3780864696; 51°19′54″N 1°24′45″E		1203529	Upload Photo	Q26499055
Tancrey House	II	47, Vale Square			4 February 1988	TR3781764703; 51°19′54″N 1°24′45″E		1086068	Upload Photo	Q26375605
Claremont	II	48, Vale Square			7 November 1983	TR3783264708; 51°19′54″N 1°24′46″E		1281635	Upload Photo	Q26570663
50, Vale Square	II	50, Vale Square			13 September 1974	TR3785864725; 51°19′55″N 1°24′47″E		1336351	Upload Photo	Q26620846
Memorial Bust and Railings to Ew Pugin	II	About 50 Metres South Of The Granville Hotel, Victoria Parade			4 February 1988	TR3881665151; 51°20′07″N 1°25′38″E		1336316	Upload Photo	Q26620814
Boundary Wall to Coastguard Cottages, East, South And West Of Courtyard	II	Victoria Parade			4 February 1988	TR3897465359; 51°20′13″N 1°25′46″E		1086072	Upload Photo	Q26375625
Granville Terrace	II	Victoria Parade			4 February 1988	TR3892465316; 51°20′12″N 1°25′44″E		1086071	Upload Photo	Q26375620
Pair of Stone Lions about 100 Metres South West of St Clu Hotel	II	Victoria Parade			4 February 1988	TR3891165264; 51°20′10″N 1°25′43″E		1281639	Upload Photo	Q26570667
Rock gardens and cliff stairs about 30 metres south of sunshelter	II	Victoria Parade			4 February 1988	TR3919565551; 51°20′19″N 1°25′58″E		1336319	Upload Photo	Q26620816
Sun shelter and rock gardens and pools, Winterstoke Gardens	II	Victoria Parade			4 February 1988	TR3921265610; 51°20′21″N 1°25′59″E		1336318	Upload Photo	Q16903542
Victoria Gardens	II	Victoria Parade, CT11 8DE			22 May 2019	TR3877065086; 51°20′05″N 1°25′35″E		1460832	Upload Photo	Q64019243
Hotel St Placids and Railed Area	II	1-2, Victoria Parade			4 February 1988	TR3873665117; 51°20′06″N 1°25′33″E		1203534	Upload Photo	Q26499059
Coastguard Cottages	II	1a-2, Victoria Parade			4 February 1988	TR3896965404; 51°20′15″N 1°25′46″E		1203551	Upload Photo	Q26499075
Nos 3, 4 and 5 And Railed Area	II	3, 4 and 5, Victoria Parade			4 February 1988	TR3874765130; 51°20′06″N 1°25′34″E		1086070	Upload Photo	Q26375615
Coastguard Cottages	II	3-10, Victoria Parade			4 February 1988	TR3895065406; 51°20′15″N 1°25′45″E		1336317	Upload Photo	Q26893499
Coastguard Cottages	II	11-15, Victoria Parade			4 February 1988	TR3893165361; 51°20′14″N 1°25′44″E		1203557	Upload Photo	Q26678891
Festival of Britain Fountain	II	Victoria Promenade			22 May 2019	TR3880065134; 51°20′06″N 1°25′37″E		1462637	Upload Photo	Q64029207
East Cliff House	II	Wellington Crescent			4 February 1988	TR3856964898; 51°19′59″N 1°25′24″E		1315682	Upload Photo	Q26602043
Eastcliff Bandstand Including Attached Dance Floor, Steps And Boundary Wall With Railing	II	Wellington Crescent			18 November 2002	TR3865164964; 51°20′01″N 1°25′29″E		1096005	Upload Photo	Q26388302
1-14, Wellington Crescent	II	1-14, Wellington Crescent			4 February 1988	TR3866365026; 51°20′03″N 1°25′29″E		1281583	Upload Photo	Q26570617
15-29, Wellington Crescent	II	15-29, Wellington Crescent			4 February 1988	TR3859664948; 51°20′01″N 1°25′26″E		1086075	Upload Photo	Q26375640
2, West Cliff Mansions	II	2, West Cliff Mansions			24 July 2008	TR3818864729; 51°19′54″N 1°25′04″E		1392667	Upload Photo	Q26671876
Carramore Residential Hotel	II	West Cliff Road			4 February 1988	TR3765564605; 51°19′51″N 1°24′36″E		1281502	Upload Photo	Q26570546
Ramsgate General Hospital, Main Buildings	II	West Cliff Road			17 October 1988	TR3771064579; 51°19′50″N 1°24′39″E		1262019	Upload Photo	Q26552922
Vale House	II	West Cliff Road			4 February 1988	TR3788464714; 51°19′54″N 1°24′49″E		1203863	Upload Photo	Q26499368
No 4 and Railed Area	II	4, West Cliff Road			13 September 1974	TR3794464713; 51°19′54″N 1°24′52″E		1086076	Upload Photo	Q26375644
No 6 and Railed Area	II	6, West Cliff Road			13 September 1974	TR3793864711; 51°19′54″N 1°24′51″E		1149359	Upload Photo	Q26442273
8, West Cliff Road	II	8, West Cliff Road			13 September 1974	TR3793464707; 51°19′54″N 1°24′51″E		1336320	Upload Photo	Q26620817
No 10 and Railed Area	II	10, West Cliff Road			13 September 1974	TR3792764706; 51°19′54″N 1°24′51″E		1315889	Upload Photo	Q26684475
12, West Cliff Road	II	12, West Cliff Road			13 September 1974	TR3792264704; 51°19′54″N 1°24′51″E		1086077	Upload Photo	Q26375649
Vale Place and Railed Areas	II	17, 19, 21 and 23, West Cliff Road			13 September 1974	TR3786564704; 51°19′54″N 1°24′48″E		1336344	Upload Photo	Q26620839
No 20 and Railed Area	II	20, West Cliff Road			4 February 1988	TR3784964667; 51°19′53″N 1°24′47″E		1336341	Upload Photo	Q26620836
The Artillery Arms	II	36, West Cliff Road, CT11 9JS			8 October 1972	TR3778664644; 51°19′52″N 1°24′43″E		1336327	Upload Photo	Q26620822
St Mildred's	II	38, West Cliff Road			13 August 1968	TR3764164550; 51°19′49″N 1°24′36″E		1086046	Upload Photo	Q26375494
42 and 44, West Cliff Road	II	42 and 44, West Cliff Road			4 February 1988	TR3761764542; 51°19′49″N 1°24′34″E		1336342	Upload Photo	Q26620837
Eagle Lodge	II	50, West Cliff Road			4 February 1988	TR3758364523; 51°19′49″N 1°24′33″E		1086047	Upload Photo	Q26375499
Priory House	II	52, West Cliff Road			4 February 1988	TR3757164517; 51°19′48″N 1°24′32″E		1086048	Upload Photo	Q26375503
Clifton Villa	II	54, West Cliff Road			4 February 1988	TR3755964509; 51°19′48″N 1°24′31″E		1336343	Upload Photo	Q26620838
56 and 58, West Cliff Road	II	56 and 58, West Cliff Road			4 February 1988	TR3754864504; 51°19′48″N 1°24′31″E		1203827	Upload Photo	Q26499335
60, West Cliff Road	II	60, West Cliff Road			4 February 1988	TR3753564495; 51°19′48″N 1°24′30″E		1086049	Upload Photo	Q26375508
1-12 Westcliff Arcade, Ramsgate	II	1-12, Westcliff Arcade, CT11 8LH			22 May 2019	TR3822964744; 51°19′55″N 1°25′06″E		1463597	Upload Photo	Q66480170
The Lido	II	Western Quadrant, Royal Esplanade			4 February 1988	TR3707764145; 51°19′37″N 1°24′06″E		1038939	Upload Photo	Q26290717
Lift from Western Undercliff to Royal Esplanade at Tr3763 6422	II	Western Undercliff			4 February 1988	TR3763564224; 51°19′39″N 1°24′35″E		1281487	Upload Photo	Q26570534
The Crown Hotel	II	York Street			4 February 1988	TR3832264804; 51°19′56″N 1°25′11″E		1203931	Upload Photo	Q26499431
6, York Street	II	6, York Street			4 February 1988	TR3828264852; 51°19′58″N 1°25′09″E		1086051	Upload Photo	Q26375519
The Perseverence Dining Room	II	8, York Street			4 February 1988	TR3828464847; 51°19′58″N 1°25′10″E		1281459	Upload Photo	Q26570509
10, York Street	II	10, York Street			4 February 1988	TR3829164843; 51°19′58″N 1°25′10″E		1336345	Upload Photo	Q26620840
The Royal Harbour	II*	CT11 9LQ			30 October 1985	TR3841464449; 51°19′45″N 1°25′15″E		1336324	Upload Photo	Q17546681
Access road, underpass and retaining walls from Court Stairs to Western Undercliff	II				4 February 1988	TR3676364114; 51°19′37″N 1°23′49″E		1086050	Upload Photo	Q26375514

== See also ==
- Grade I listed buildings in Kent
- Grade II* listed buildings in Kent

== Sources ==
- Newman, John (2013) [1969], Kent: North-East and East, The Buildings of England, New Haven and London: Yale University Press, ISBN 978-0-300-18506-5
