= Listed buildings in Sarre, Kent =

Civil Parish in Kent, England

Sarre is a village and civil parish in the Thanet District of Kent, England. It contains 19 grade II listed buildings that are recorded in the National Heritage List for England.

This list is based on the information retrieved online from Historic England.

== Key ==
Grade	Criteria
I	Buildings that are of exceptional interest
II*	Particularly important buildings of more than special interest
II	Buildings that are of special interest

== Listing ==
Name	Grade	Location	Type	Completed (Note: The date given is the date used by Historic England as significant for the initial building or that of an important part in the structure's description.)	Date designated	Grid ref. (Note: The grid reference is based on the British national grid reference system, sometimes known as OSGB36, used by the Ordnance Survey.) Geo-coordinates	Notes	Entry number (Note: The "List Entry Number" is a unique number assigned to each listed building and scheduled monument by Historic England.)	Image	Wikidata
Barn About 20 Metres North West of the Elms	II	Canterbury Road			7 October 1986	TR2560064923; 51°20′19″N 1°14′15″E		1266545	Upload Photo	Q26557029
Kings Head Inn	II	Canterbury Road	pub		25 June 1971	TR2565165016; 51°20′22″N 1°14′18″E		1266480	Kings Head Inn More images	Q26556969
Lambs Cottage	II	Canterbury Road			25 June 1971	TR2561165036; 51°20′23″N 1°14′16″E		1225048	Upload Photo	Q26519175
Mill Shop	II	Canterbury Road			9 February 1990	TR2596065086; 51°20′24″N 1°14′34″E		1266227	Upload Photo	Q26556738
Sarre Mill	II	Canterbury Road	smock mill		11 October 1963	TR2596665076; 51°20′23″N 1°14′35″E		1225147	Sarre Mill More images	Q15275487
Stable Block About 10 Metres North of the Elms	II	Canterbury Road			7 October 1986	TR2562764945; 51°20′20″N 1°14′17″E		1266544	Upload Photo	Q26557028
The Elms	II	Canterbury Road			13 October 1952	TR2565364927; 51°20′19″N 1°14′18″E		1225130	Upload Photo	Q26519251
White Cottage and Elleswood	II	Canterbury Road			25 June 1971	TR2563165003; 51°20′22″N 1°14′17″E		1225049	Upload Photo	Q26519176
Former Barn at G.g. Baxter's Factory	II	Chantry Park, CT7 0LG			7 October 1986	TR2554965122; 51°20′25″N 1°14′13″E		1225054	Upload Photo	Q26519181
Barn About 10 Metres North of Bolingbroke	II	Old Road			7 October 1986	TR2545465090; 51°20′25″N 1°14′08″E		1225053	Upload Photo	Q26519180
Bolingbroke	II	Old Road			25 June 1971	TR2547965070; 51°20′24″N 1°14′09″E		1225194	Upload Photo	Q26519310
Coach House About 20 Metres East of Bolingbroke	II	Old Road			7 October 1986	TR2550065074; 51°20′24″N 1°14′11″E		1225201	Upload Photo	Q26519316
Olde Cottage	II	Old Road			25 June 1971	TR2558665013; 51°20′22″N 1°14′15″E		1225052	Upload Photo	Q26519179
Pococks	II	Old Road			7 October 1986	TR2555265059; 51°20′23″N 1°14′13″E		1266549	Upload Photo	Q26557031
Wychways	II	Old Road			25 June 1971	TR2559065007; 51°20′22″N 1°14′15″E		1266487	Upload Photo	Q26556976
Court Cottages	II	1-4, Ramsgate Road			2 January 1973	TR2574164985; 51°20′21″N 1°14′23″E		1266550	Upload Photo	Q26557032
Sarre Court Hotel	II	Ramsgate Road			13 October 1952	TR2569464898; 51°20′18″N 1°14′20″E		1225221	Upload Photo	Q26519335
The Crown Inn	II	Ramsgate Road	pub		11 October 1963	TR2575864966; 51°20′20″N 1°14′24″E		1225216	The Crown Inn More images	Q26519331
Tollgate Cottage	II	Ramsgate Road			14 May 1984	TR2599064988; 51°20′21″N 1°14′36″E		1225055	Upload Photo	Q26519182

== See also ==
- Grade I listed buildings in Kent
- Grade II* listed buildings in Kent

== Sources ==
- Newman, John (2013) [1969], Kent: North-East and East, The Buildings of England, New Haven and London: Yale University Press, ISBN 978-0-300-18506-5
