= Listed buildings in St Nicholas-at-Wade =

Civil Parish in Kent, England

St Nicholas-at-Wade is a village and civil parish in the Thanet District of Kent, England. It contains 38 listed buildings that are recorded in the National Heritage List for England. Of these one is grade I, two are grade II* and 35 are grade II.

This list is based on the information retrieved online from Historic England.

== Key ==
Grade	Criteria
I	Buildings that are of exceptional interest
II*	Particularly important buildings of more than special interest
II	Buildings that are of special interest

== Listing ==
Name	Grade	Location	Type	Completed (Note: The date given is the date used by Historic England as significant for the initial building or that of an important part in the structure's description.)	Date designated	Grid ref. (Note: The grid reference is based on the British national grid reference system, sometimes known as OSGB36, used by the Ordnance Survey.) Geo-coordinates	Notes	Entry number (Note: The "List Entry Number" is a unique number assigned to each listed building and scheduled monument by Historic England.)	Image	Wikidata
Barn at Tr 285680	II	Canterbury Road, St. Nicholas At Wade, Upper Hale			7 October 1986	TR2846467958; 51°21′53″N 1°16′50″E		1224796	Upload Photo	Q26518948
Barns About 50 Metres South of Nether Hale	II	Canterbury Road, St. Nicholas At Wade, Nether Hale			7 October 1986	TR2790367701; 51°21′45″N 1°16′21″E		1224795	Upload Photo	Q26518947
Granary Or Dovecot About 15 Metres South of Barn at Tr 285680	II	Canterbury Road, St. Nicholas At Wade, Upper Hale			7 October 1986	TR2847567935; 51°21′52″N 1°16′51″E		1266640	Upload Photo	Q26557113
Nether Hale Farmhouse	II*	Canterbury Road, St. Nicholas At Wade, Nether Hale			13 October 1982	TR2793267790; 51°21′48″N 1°16′22″E		1266639	Upload Photo	Q17546661
5, Court Road	II	5, Court Road, St. Nicholas At Wade			7 October 1986	TR2628966841; 51°21′20″N 1°14′55″E		1224798	Upload Photo	Q26518950
Barn About 20 Metres North East of Saint Nicholas Court	II	Court Road, St. Nicholas At Wade			7 October 1986	TR2593566907; 51°21′23″N 1°14′37″E		1224800	Upload Photo	Q26518951
Old Kent Barn	II	Court Road, Birchington, CT7 0NH, St. Nicholas At Wade			25 June 1971	TR2645266735; 51°21′16″N 1°15′03″E		1266641	Upload Photo	Q26557114
Saint Nicholas Court	II*	Court Road, St. Nicholas At Wade			13 October 1952	TR2595866890; 51°21′22″N 1°14′38″E		1224799	Upload Photo	Q17546657
Streete House	II	Court Road, St. Nicholas At Wade			13 October 1952	TR2641166738; 51°21′16″N 1°15′01″E		1224797	Upload Photo	Q26518949
Sycamore House	II	Court Road, St. Nicholas At Wade			7 October 1986	TR2638866716; 51°21′16″N 1°15′00″E		1224952	Upload Photo	Q26519089
Barn About 50 Metres North West of Down Barton	II	Down Barton Road, St. Nicholas At Wade			7 October 1986	TR2552266231; 51°21′01″N 1°14′14″E		1366024	Upload Photo	Q26647658
Down Barton	II	Down Barton Road, St. Nicholas At Wade			7 October 1986	TR2556966194; 51°21′00″N 1°14′17″E		1224802	Upload Photo	Q26518953
Granary About 20 Metres South of Down Barton	II	Down Barton Road, St. Nicholas At Wade			7 October 1986	TR2556766162; 51°20′59″N 1°14′16″E		1224803	Upload Photo	Q26518954
School House	II	Down Barton Road, St. Nicholas At Wade			7 October 1986	TR2643566692; 51°21′15″N 1°15′02″E		1224804	Upload Photo	Q26518955
Nine Nails	II	Potten Street, St. Nicholas At Wade			25 June 1971	TR2582667481; 51°21′41″N 1°14′33″E		1224808	Upload Photo	Q26518959
Outbuilding About 20 Metres South of Chambers Wall Farmhouse	II	Potten Street, St. Nicholas At Wade			7 October 1986	TR2547767615; 51°21′46″N 1°14′15″E		1225009	Upload Photo	Q26519139
Warehorn Cottage	II	Potten Street, St. Nicholas At Wade			25 June 1971	TR2498867466; 51°21′42″N 1°13′50″E		1266643	Upload Photo	Q26557116
Ambry Court	II	Shuart Lane, St. Nicholas At Wade			25 June 1971	TR2649366776; 51°21′18″N 1°15′06″E		1266542	Upload Photo	Q26557026
Barn About 30 Metres South West of Shuart Farm Cottage	II	Shuart Lane, St. Nicholas At Wade			7 October 1986	TR2684567857; 51°21′52″N 1°15′26″E		1225097	Upload Photo	Q26519219
Barn at Crump's Farm (about 50 Metres North of Church of Saint Nicholas)	II	Shuart Lane, St. Nicholas At Wade			7 October 1986	TR2656466757; 51°21′17″N 1°15′09″E		1225039	Upload Photo	Q26519167
Cherry Tree Cottage	II	Shuart Lane, St. Nicholas At Wade			8 January 1982	TR2657266930; 51°21′22″N 1°15′10″E		1225036	Upload Photo	Q26519164
Church Cottages	II	1 and 2, Shuart Lane, St. Nicholas At Wade			25 June 1971	TR2647366703; 51°21′15″N 1°15′04″E		1225035	Upload Photo	Q26519163
Granary About 20 Metres South West of Shuart Farm Cottage	II	Shuart Lane, St. Nicholas At Wade			7 October 1986	TR2685767864; 51°21′52″N 1°15′27″E		1225038	Upload Photo	Q26519166
Shuart Farm Cottage	II	Shuart Lane, St. Nicholas At Wade			25 June 1971	TR2688067886; 51°21′53″N 1°15′28″E		1225037	Upload Photo	Q26519165
Shuart Farmhouse	II	Shuart Lane, St. Nicholas At Wade			11 October 1963	TR2690167885; 51°21′53″N 1°15′29″E		1266543	Upload Photo	Q26557027
North Grange and the Grange	II	Sun Lane, St. Nicholas At Wade			11 October 1963	TR2668866682; 51°21′14″N 1°15′16″E		1225044	Upload Photo	Q26519171
Bramble Cottage	II	The Length, St. Nicholas At Wade			25 June 1971	TR2681066548; 51°21′10″N 1°15′21″E		1224805	Upload Photo	Q26518956
Chalk Garden	II	The Length, St. Nicholas At Wade			25 June 1971	TR2701866444; 51°21′06″N 1°15′32″E		1366025	Upload Photo	Q26647659
Elder Cottage and Adjoining Cottage	II	The Length, St. Nicholas At Wade			25 June 1971	TR2678466565; 51°21′10″N 1°15′20″E		1224806	Upload Photo	Q26518957
Forge Adjoining Forge House to the Right	II	The Length, St. Nicholas At Wade			25 June 1971	TR2668966586; 51°21′11″N 1°15′15″E		1266642	Upload Photo	Q26557115
Forge House	II	The Length, St. Nicholas At Wade			25 June 1971	TR2669866586; 51°21′11″N 1°15′16″E		1225004	Upload Photo	Q26519134
Pepper Alley	II	1 and 2, The Length, St. Nicholas At Wade			25 June 1971	TR2670966580; 51°21′11″N 1°15′16″E		1225006	Upload Photo	Q26519136
Rose Cottages	II	1 and 2, The Length, St. Nicholas At Wade			25 June 1971	TR2676866551; 51°21′10″N 1°15′19″E		1224807	Upload Photo	Q26518958
Walmer Cottage	II	The Length, St. Nicholas At Wade			7 October 1986	TR2681666538; 51°21′09″N 1°15′22″E		1224994	Upload Photo	Q26519125
Church of Saint Nicholas	I	The Street, St. Nicholas At Wade	church building		11 October 1963	TR2651466699; 51°21′15″N 1°15′07″E		1225043	Church of Saint Nicholas More images	Q17530188
The Bell Inn	II	The Street, St. Nicholas At Wade			25 June 1971	TR2662266612; 51°21′12″N 1°15′12″E		1225040	Upload Photo	Q26519168
The Farrier's Cottage	II	The Street, St. Nicholas At Wade			25 June 1971	TR2649066672; 51°21′14″N 1°15′05″E		1225042	Upload Photo	Q26519170
The Old Cottage	II	The Street, St. Nicholas At Wade			13 October 1952	TR2649866670; 51°21′14″N 1°15′06″E		1225041	Upload Photo	Q26519169

== See also ==
- Grade I listed buildings in Kent
- Grade II* listed buildings in Kent

== Sources ==
- Newman, John (2013) [1969], Kent: North-East and East, The Buildings of England, New Haven and London: Yale University Press, ISBN 978-0-300-18506-5
