= Ursuline =

Ursuline may refer to:

- Ursulines, Catholic religious institutes that have been deeply involved in education

== Canada ==
- École des Ursulines, Quebec, founded in 1639

== United Kingdom ==
England

- Brentwood Ursuline Convent High School, an all-girls school in Essex
- Ursuline Academy Ilford, an all-girls school and specialist science school, situated in north east London
- Ursuline College, Westgate-on-Sea, a specialist sports school in north-east Kent
- Ursuline High School (Wimbledon), an all-girls school in Wimbledon, London, for ages 11–19

== Taiwan ==
- Wenzao Ursuline University of Languages, a languages school in Kaohsiung

== United States ==
- Ursuline High School (Santa Rosa, California), an all-girls high school from 1880 to 2011
- Ursuline Academy (Delaware), a school in Wilmington that offers grades K–12
- Ursuline Academy (Illinois), a high school in Springfield that operated from 1857 to 2007
- Ursuline Campus Schools, a campus containing five schools in Louisville, Kentucky
- Ursuline Academy (New Orleans), an all-girls high school and elementary school in Louisiana
- Ursuline Academy (Dedham, Massachusetts), an all-girls school in Dedham
- Ursuline Academy (Missouri), an all-girls high school near St. Louis
- Ursuline Academy (Great Falls, Montana), a convent and former school that is listed on the National Register of Historic Places
- The Ursuline School, an all-girls middle and high school in New Rochelle, New York
- Ursuline Academy (Cincinnati, Ohio), an all-girls high school founded in 1896
- Ursuline College, a women's college in Pepper Pike, Ohio
- Ursuline High School, Youngstown, a co-ed high school in Ohio, founded in 1905
- Ursuline Academy (Pittsburgh), Pennsylvania, an all-girls school from 1895 to 1981
- Ursuline Academy of Dallas, an all-girls school in Texas
- Ursuline Academy (San Antonio, Texas), a National Register of Historic Places listing in Bexar County, Texas

== See also ==
- St. Ursula Academy (disambiguation)
- Ursuline College (disambiguation)
- Ursuline High School (disambiguation)
- Ursuline Sisters (disambiguation)
