= Isle of Thanet Rural District =

Former local government area in the UK

- Area
  - 1911: 20,825 acres (84.28 km^{2})
  - 1921: 18,639 acres (75.43 km^{2})
  - 1931: 18,639 acres (75.43 km^{2})
- Population
  - 1911: 11,144
  - 1921: 10,564
  - 1931: 14,085
- History
  - Created: 1894
  - Abolished: 1935
- Government: Isle of Thanet Rural District Council
  - HQ: Rural District Offices, Minster

The Isle of Thanet Rural District was a rural district covering part of the Isle of Thanet in the county of Kent, England, from 1894 to 1935. Most of its former area is now part of the Thanet district.

When the district was created several ancient parishes were split to create urban and rural parts. Northdown was created from the part of Margate St John the Baptist that was outside the Municipal Borough of Margate, St Lawrence Extra was created from the part of St Lawrence that was outside the Municipal Borough of Ramsgate. St Peter Extra was created from the part of St Peter's that was not part of Broadstairs and St Peter's Urban District.

It included the following civil parishes:

Parish	From	To	Notes
Acol	1894	1935	reduced to enlarge Municipal Borough of Margate, remaining parish transferred to Eastry Rural District
Birchington	1894	1935	abolished and used to enlarge Municipal Borough of Margate with small part to Acol
Garlinge	1894	1935	abolished and used to enlarge Municipal Borough of Margate with small part to Municipal Borough of Ramsgate
Minster	1894	1935	reduced to enlarge Municipal Borough of Margate, Municipal Borough of Ramsgate, Municipal Borough of Sandwich and Worth, remaining parish transferred to Eastry Rural District
Monkton	1894	1935	transferred to Eastry Rural District
Northdown	1894	1913	abolished and used to enlarge Municipal Borough of Margate and Garlinge
St Lawrence Extra	1894	1935	abolished and used to enlarge Municipal Borough of Ramsgate
St Nicholas at Wade	1894	1935	transferred to Eastry Rural District
St Peter Extra	1894	1914	abolished and used to enlarge Garlinge and Broadstairs and St Peter's Urban District
Sarre	1894	1935	transferred to Eastry Rural District
Stonar	1894	1935	abolished and used to enlarge Municipal Borough of Sandwich
Westgate on Sea	1894	1935	abolished and used to enlarge Municipal Borough of Margate

The rural district was abolished in 1935 by the County of Kent Review Order, 1935.
