= Birchington West =

Ward of Thanet Borough Council

Birchington West ward was a ward of Thanet Borough Council in Kent, England, and was created in the boundary changes of 1979, and had previously been part of the Margate Birchington ward. In 2025 there was still two wards named Birchington South and Birchington North.

Councillors Neville Hudson and Bentley transferred from Margate Birchington ward and contested and won the 1979 election.

1979 Election

Birchington West ward
Party	Candidate	Votes	%	±%
Independent	Neville Hudson	1,301	57.5%	
Independent	D Bentley	1,208	53.4%	
Conservative	W Sutton	804	35.5%	
Conservative	R Evans	792	35.0%	
Liberal	F Casey	158	7.0%	
Labour	P Harrington	158	7.0%	
Majority		497,404		
Turnout		2,263	72.3%	3,130

1983 Election

Birchington West ward
Party	Candidate	Votes	%	±%
Independent	Neville Hudson	918	49.8%	−7.7%
Independent	D Bentley	836	45.4%	−8.0%
Conservative	Sid Barry	763	41.4%	+5.9%
Labour	P Hayward	161	8.7%	+1.7%
Labour	L Sandford	129	7.0%	n/a
Majority		155,73		
Turnout		1,842	60.9%	3,024

1987 Election

Birchington West ward
Party	Candidate	Votes	%	±%
Independent	Neville Hudson	1,176	64.5%	+14.7%
Independent	S Barry	1,164	63.9%	+18.5% (ex−Conservative candidate)
Conservative	I Bedwell	530	29.1%	−12.3%
Conservative	E Hunter	399	21.9%	n/a
Labour	P Harrington	117	6.4%	−2.3%
Labour	S Denman	109	6.0%	−1.0%
Majority		646,634		
Turnout		1,823	56.8%	3,210

1991 Election

Birchington West ward
Party	Candidate	Votes	%	±%
Independent	Sid Barry	813	47.9%	−16.0%
Independent	Neville Hudson	802	47.3%	−17.2%
Conservative	V Jones	636	37.5%	+8.4%
Conservative	G Eady	635	37.4%	+15.5%
Labour	E Rowe	126	7.4%	+1.0%
Green	L Williams	116	6.8%	n/a
Labour	C Bridgeland	105	6.2%	+0.2%
Majority		177,166		
Turnout		1,696	50.7%	3,346

1995 Election

Birchington West ward
Party	Candidate	Votes	%	±%
Independent	Neville Hudson	657	41.7%	−5.6%
Independent	N Thomas	587	37.3%	−10.6%
Conservative	C Barton	482	30.6%	−6.9%
Labour	J Simmons	453	28.8%	+21.4%
Labour	D Brewer	446	28.3%	+22.1%
Conservative	J Wainwright	429	27.2%	−10.2%
Majority		175,105		
Turnout		1,575	47.0%	3,352

1999 Election

Birchington West ward
Party	Candidate	Votes	%	±%
Independent	Nevile Hudson	856	63.4%	+21.7%
Independent	N Thomas	616	45.6%	+8.3%
Conservative	D Cooper	480	35.6%	+5.0%
Labour	C Rose	284	21.0%	−7.8%
Labour	R Waddingham	243	18.0%	−10.3%
Majority		376,176		
Turnout		1,350	40.8%	3,310

There were boundary changes in May 2001 and this resulted in Birchington West, losing voters south of the London to Margate railway line (they were transferred to what became Birchington South ward), and acquiring voters which had been in Birchington East ward which had been north of the railway line. The ward was then renamed Birchington North.
