= Carlton Cinema, Westgate-on-Sea =

Grade II listed cinema in Kent, United Kingdom

Carlton Cinema
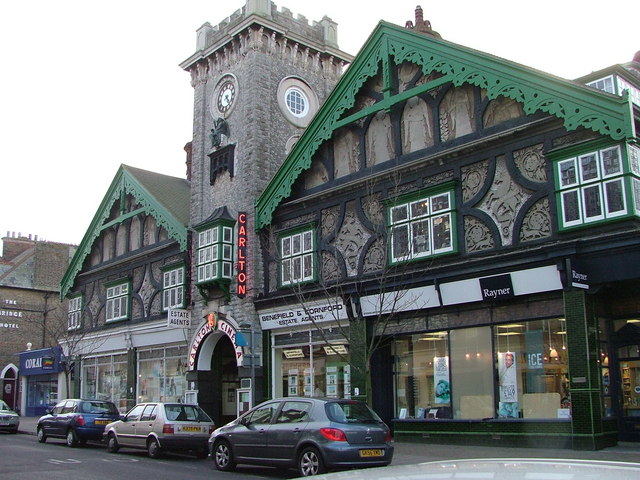
- "An extraordinary mélange" - John Newman

- Location within Kent
- 51.3821°N 1.3366°E
- Type: Cinema
- Location: Westgate-on-Sea, Kent

History
- Built: 1910

Site notes
- Governing body: Privately owned

Listed Building – Grade II
- Official name: Nos 25 to 35 (Odd) Including Carlton Cinema
- Designated: 22 September 1973
- Reference no.: 1094678

The Carlton Cinema, in Westgate-on-Sea, Kent, England dates from 1910. The extension of the railway into East Kent in 1871 led to the creation of a number of seaside resorts along the Kent coast to the west of Margate. Westgate-on-Sea was built in the 1870 by the London-based developers Corbett & McClymont. In 1910, a town hall was constructed but within 2 years, the building had been converted into a cinema. Originally named the Town Hall Cinema, it was renamed the Carlton in the 1930s. It remains a, privately owned, functioning cinema and is a Grade II listed building.

== History and description ==
The north-east Kent coast had been a popular holiday resort for Londoners since the establishment of Margate as one of England's first seaside resorts in the early 18th century. The 1860s saw the completion of the London, Chatham and Dover Railway with its terminal at Margate opening in 1863. This led to the construction of a number of resorts along the Kent coast to the west of Margate, including Westgate-on-Sea. Developed by the firm of Corbett & McClymont, which had a large property development and construction business in West London, many of the buildings in the town were designed by the company architect Charles Beazley.

The town hall does not have a recorded architect but was built in 1910. Within two years, it had been converted to a cinema and it remains a privately run cinema a century later. In 1987, the Carlton won the British cinema industry’s “Cinema of the Year” award. John Newman, in his Kent: Northeast and East Pevsner, describes the Carlton as "an extraordinary mélange of disparate motifs". A central, crenellated clock tower is flanked by two-storey, gabled wings with chimneystacks of an "outsized" Tudoresque appearance. Beneath the clock face is a statue of a trumpeting angel. To the rear is a range of windows in a Moorish Revival style. Margate's Civic society describes the overall architectural effect as "Swiss-Gothic". The cinema is a Grade II listed building.

== Sources ==
- Barker, Nigel; Brodie, Allan; Dermott, Nick; Jessop, Lucy; Winter, Gary (2007). Margate's Seaside Heritage. London: English Heritage. ISBN 978-1-905-62466-9.
- McCarthy, Colin; McCarthy, David (2007). Railways of Britain: Kent and Sussex. Hersham, Surrey: Ian Allan. ISBN 978-0-7110-3222-4. OCLC 931370894.
- Newman, John (2013). Kent: North East and East. The Buildings of England. New Haven, US and London: Yale University Press. ISBN 978-0-300-18506-5. OCLC 1114904691.
