= Listed buildings in Monkton, Kent =

Historic structures in Kent, England

Monkton is a village and civil parish in the Thanet District of Kent, England. It contains 22 listed buildings that are recorded in the National Heritage List for England. Of these one is grade I, two are grade II* and 19 are grade II.

This list is based on the information retrieved online from Historic England.

== Key ==
Grade	Criteria
I	Buildings that are of exceptional interest
II*	Particularly important buildings of more than special interest
II	Buildings that are of special interest

== Listing ==
Name	Grade	Location	Type	Completed (Note: The date given is the date used by Historic England as significant for the initial building or that of an important part in the structure's description.)	Date designated	Grid ref. (Note: The grid reference is based on the British national grid reference system, sometimes known as OSGB36, used by the Ordnance Survey.) Geo-coordinates	Notes	Entry number (Note: The "List Entry Number" is a unique number assigned to each listed building and scheduled monument by Historic England.)	Image	Wikidata
1 and 2 Gore Street Cottages	II	1 and 2 Gore Street Cottages, Gore Street			10 December 1981	TR2729065109; 51°20′23″N 1°15′43″E		1224679	Upload Photo	Q26518840
3 and 4 Gore Street Cottages	II	3 and 4 Gore Street Cottages, Gore Street			10 December 1981	TR2727065105; 51°20′22″N 1°15′42″E		1266888	Upload Photo	Q26682691
Barns About 50 Metres South of Gore Street Farmhouse	II	Gore Street			7 October 1986	TR2734365068; 51°20′21″N 1°15′46″E		1224341	Upload Photo	Q26518530
Gore Street Farmhouse	II*	Gore Street			13 October 1952	TR2730965117; 51°20′23″N 1°15′44″E		1224340	Upload Photo	Q17546640
Granary About 30 Metres South West of Gore Street Farmhouse	II	Gore Street			7 October 1986	TR2730765075; 51°20′21″N 1°15′44″E		1224643	Upload Photo	Q26518808
The Royal Exchange	II	Millers Lane			10 April 1987	TR2808865271; 51°20′27″N 1°16′25″E		1225680	Upload Photo	Q26519754
Cleve Court and Cleve Lodge	II*	Minster Road			11 October 1963	TR3115666315; 51°20′56″N 1°19′05″E		1224683	Upload Photo	Q17546652
76-84, Monkton Street	II	76-84, Monkton Street			7 October 1986	TR2888164982; 51°20′16″N 1°17′05″E		1224344	Upload Photo	Q26518533
Church of Saint Mary Magdalene	I	Monkton Street	church building		11 October 1963	TR2790465254; 51°20′26″N 1°16′15″E		1224791	Church of Saint Mary Magdalene More images	Q17530184
Delce Cottages and the Old Post Office	II	108-114, Monkton Street			7 October 1986	TR2867065058; 51°20′19″N 1°16′54″E		1224789	Upload Photo	Q26518941
Field Cottages	II	148 and 150, Monkton Street			7 October 1986	TR2842765169; 51°20′23″N 1°16′42″E		1224790	Upload Photo	Q26518942
Field House	II	146, Monkton Street			11 October 1963	TR2844065159; 51°20′23″N 1°16′42″E		1224345	Upload Photo	Q26518534
Granary About 3 Metres North of Monkton Court	II	Monkton Street			7 October 1986	TR2791665219; 51°20′25″N 1°16′16″E		1266638	Upload Photo	Q26557112
Lantern Cottage and No 153	II	Monkton Street			1 February 1972	TR2845765167; 51°20′23″N 1°16′43″E		1224731	Upload Photo	Q26518890
Monkton Court	II	Monkton Street			7 October 1986	TR2791465202; 51°20′25″N 1°16′15″E		1224793	Upload Photo	Q26518945
Parsonage House	II	Monkton Street			1 February 1972	TR2846465191; 51°20′24″N 1°16′44″E		1266849	Upload Photo	Q26557307
Stocks, About 30 Metres North West of Church of Saint Mary	II	About 30 Metres North West Of Church Of Saint Mary, Monkton Street			11 October 1963	TR2793765278; 51°20′27″N 1°16′17″E		1266637	Upload Photo	Q26557111
Thatch Cottage	II	62, Monkton Street			7 October 1986	TR2897164981; 51°20′16″N 1°17′09″E		1224772	Upload Photo	Q26518926
The Vicarage	II	Monkton Street			5 December 1973	TR2839065217; 51°20′24″N 1°16′40″E		1224342	Upload Photo	Q26518531
Two Table Tombs About 2 and 10 Metres North of Church of Saint Mary	II	Monkton Street			7 October 1986	TR2790765263; 51°20′27″N 1°16′15″E		1224792	Upload Photo	Q26518943
Walters Hall Farmhouse	II	Monkton Street			26 October 1972	TR2914764965; 51°20′15″N 1°17′18″E		1224343	Upload Photo	Q26518532
1-5 Parsonage Oasts	II	Seamark Street			1 February 1972	TR2845165263; 51°20′26″N 1°16′43″E		1224794	Upload Photo	Q26518946

== See also ==
- Grade I listed buildings in Kent
- Grade II* listed buildings in Kent

== Sources ==
- Newman, John (2013) [1969], Kent: North-East and East, The Buildings of England, New Haven and London: Yale University Press, ISBN 978-0-300-18506-5
