= Listed buildings in Westgate-on-Sea =

Civil Parish in Kent, England

Westgate-on-Sea is a village and civil parish in the Thanet District of Kent, England. It contains 14 grade II listed buildings that are recorded in the National Heritage List for England.

This list is based on the information retrieved online from Historic England.

== Key ==
Grade	Criteria
I	Buildings that are of exceptional interest
II*	Particularly important buildings of more than special interest
II	Buildings that are of special interest

== Listing ==
Name	Grade	Location	Type	Completed (Note: The date given is the date used by Historic England as significant for the initial building or that of an important part in the structure's description.)	Date designated	Grid ref. (Note: The grid reference is based on the British national grid reference system, sometimes known as OSGB36, used by the Ordnance Survey.) Geo-coordinates	Notes	Entry number (Note: The "List Entry Number" is a unique number assigned to each listed building and scheduled monument by Historic England.)	Image	Wikidata
Summerlands Lodge	II	123 Canterbury Road, CT8 8LY			22 May 2012	TR3233469689; 51°22′43″N 1°20′14″E		1406991	Upload Photo	Q26675910
Questeds	II	82, Canterbury Road, Westgate On Sea, Margate			22 February 1973	TR3253469934; 51°22′51″N 1°20′25″E		1203397	Upload Photo	Q26498934
St Augustine's College and the Abbey School	II	Canterbury Road, Westgate On Sea, Margate			20 March 1992	TR3224569672; 51°22′43″N 1°20′09″E		1260305	Upload Photo	Q26551335
Ursuline Convent School	II	225, Canterbury Road, Westgate On Sea, Margate			22 February 1973	TR3163969530; 51°22′39″N 1°19′38″E		1088988	Upload Photo	Q26381406
St Michaels	II	Domneva Road, Westgate On Sea, Margate			1 August 1989	TR3195869821; 51°22′48″N 1°19′55″E		1260333	Upload Photo	Q26551358
Lockwoods Builders Yard, Including Attached Gates, Gatepiers, Wall and Post Box	II	Including Attached Gates, Gatepiers, Wall And Post Box, Essex Road, Westgate On Sea, Margate			6 August 2002	TR3267869977; 51°22′52″N 1°20′32″E		1088077	Upload Photo	Q26380463
The Observatory	II	Sea Road, Westgate On Sea, Margate			6 August 2002	TR3198970092; 51°22′57″N 1°19′57″E		1088076	Upload Photo	Q26380462
The Stable Block to the Rear of Number 61, Waterside Hotel	II	Sea Road, Westgate On Sea, Margate			31 August 2004	TR3219070220; 51°23′01″N 1°20′08″E		1390805	Upload Photo	Q26670184
Waterside Private Hotel	II	61, Sea Road, Westgate On Sea, Margate			22 February 1973	TR3214270237; 51°23′01″N 1°20′05″E		1094675	Upload Photo	Q26387004
Westgate-on-sea British Legion War Memorial	II	Sea Road, CT8 8QW			27 February 2017	TR3232070422; 51°23′07″N 1°20′15″E		1443700	Upload Photo	Q66478571
Nos 25 to 35 (odd) Including Carlton Cinema	II	25-35, St Mildred's Road, Westgate On Sea, Margate			22 February 1973	TR3227570068; 51°22′56″N 1°20′12″E		1094678	Upload Photo	Q26387007
Castle Cottage	II	Sussex Gardens, Westgate On Sea, Margate			22 February 1973	TR3267270294; 51°23′02″N 1°20′33″E		1094684	Upload Photo	Q26387012
Church of St Saviour	II	Westgate Bay Avenue, Westgate On Sea, Margate	church building		22 February 1973	TR3224870098; 51°22′57″N 1°20′10″E		1350897	Church of St Saviour More images	Q26634053

== See also ==
- Grade I listed buildings in Kent
- Grade II* listed buildings in Kent

== Sources ==
- Newman, John (2013) [1969], Kent: North-East and East, The Buildings of England, New Haven and London: Yale University Press, ISBN 978-0-300-18506-5
