= Birchington North =

Electoral ward in Kent, England

Birchington North, a British electoral district, was created at the boundary changes of May 2001. It was composed of the town of Birchington north of the London-to-Margate railway line, with territory taken from Birchington West and Birchington East wards. The first election took place in May 2003, and resulted in the incumbent Independents losing out to a resurgent Conservative Party.

2003 Election

Birchington North ward
Party	Candidate	Votes	%	±%
Conservative	Roger Latchford	868	56.3%	n/a
Conservative	Simon Day	846	54.9%	n/a
Independent	Neville Hudson	397	25.7%	n/a
Independent	N Thomas	286	18.5%	n/a
Labour	C Rose	197	12.8%	n/a
Labour	M Signorell	177	11.5%	n/a
Independent	B Hardy	175	11.3%	n/a
Majority		471,449		
Turnout		1,542	48.3%	3,191

2007 Election

Birchington North ward
Party	Candidate	Votes	%	±%
Conservative	Roger Latchford	797	50.4%	−5.9
Conservative	Simon Day	648	41.0%	−13.9
Independent	John Worrow (Gray Party)	555	35.1%	n/a
Liberal Democrats	Bill Furness	270	17.1%	n/a
Liberal Democrats	Peter Bloore	213	13.5%	n/a
Green	Colin Bridge	203	12.8%	n/a
Labour	Rebecca Scobie	99	6.3%	−6.5%
Labour	Susan Scobie	88	5.6%	−5.9%
Majority		243,93		
Turnout		1,581	49.9%	3,170
