= Eastry Rural District =

Former local government area in Kent, England

Coordinates: 51°16′N 1°18′E

- Area
  - 1911: 43,682 acres (176.77 km^{2})
  - 1931: 43,683 acres (176.78 km^{2})
  - 1961: 54,283 acres (219.68 km^{2})
- Population
  - 1911: 13,161
  - 1931: 18,448
  - 1961: 22,328
- History
  - Created: 1894
  - Abolished: 1974
- Government: Eastry Rural District Council
  - HQ: Council Offices, 51 Strand Street, Sandwich

Eastry Rural District was a rural district in the county of Kent, England, from 1894 to 1974. It was the successor (designated under Part II of the Local Government Act 1894) to the Eastry Rural Sanitary Authority (designated under Part II of the Public Health Act 1875). The Eastry Rural Sanitary Authority, which initially had sanitary, water and public nuisance functions, assumed (within its district) the highway functions of the Wingham Highway Board with effect from 31 May 1880, which then were continued by the Eastry Rural District Council.

Eastry Rural District was subject to a significant boundary reform in 1935 when several parishes were gained from the disbanded Isle of Thanet Rural District and other parishes were reorganised.

It included the following civil parishes:

Parish	From	To	Notes
Acol	1935	1974	gained from Isle of Thanet Rural District
Ash	1894	1974	
Aylesham	1951	1974	created from part of Nonington
Barfreston	1894	1935	abolished and used to enlarge Eythorne
Betteshanger	1894	1935	abolished and used to enlarge Northbourne
Chillenden	1894	1935	abolished and used to enlarge Goodnestone
Eastry	1894	1974	
Elmstone	1894	1935	abolished and used to enlarge Preston with small part to Wingham
Eythorne	1894	1974	
Goodnestone	1894	1974	
Great Mongeham	1894	1935	abolished and used to enlarge Municipal Borough of Deal with small part to Sholden
Ham	1894	1935	abolished and used to enlarge Northbourne
Knowlton	1894	1935	abolished and used to enlarge Goodnestone
Little Mongeham	1894	1935	abolished and used to enlarge Sutton
Minster	1935	1974	gained from Isle of Thanet Rural District
Monkton	1935	1974	gained from Isle of Thanet Rural District
Nonington	1894	1974	
Northbourne	1894	1974	
Preston	1894	1974	
Ripple	1894	1974	
St Nicholas at Wade	1935	1974	gained from Isle of Thanet Rural District
Sarre	1935	1974	gained from Isle of Thanet Rural District
Sholden	1894	1974	
Staple	1894	1974	
Stourmouth	1894	1974	
Sutton	1894	1974	
Tilmanstone	1894	1974	
Waldershare	1894	1935	abolished and used to enlarge Ripple and Tilmanstone
Wingham	1894	1974	
Woodnesborough	1894	1974	reduced by 376 acres (1.52 km^{2}) in 1935 to enlarge Municipal Borough of Sandwich
Worth	1894	1974	reduced by 255 acres (1.03 km^{2}) in 1935 to enlarge Municipal Borough of Sandwich
