= Listed buildings in Acol =

Civil Parish in Kent, England

Acol is a village and civil parish in the Thanet District of Kent, England. It contains five grade II listed buildings that are recorded in the National Heritage List for England.

This list is based on the information retrieved online from Historic England.

== Key ==
Grade	Criteria
I	Buildings that are of exceptional interest
II*	Particularly important buildings of more than special interest
II	Buildings that are of special interest

== Listing ==
Name	Grade	Location	Type	Completed (Note: The date given is the date used by Historic England as significant for the initial building or that of an important part in the structure's description.)	Date designated	Grid ref. (Note: The grid reference is based on the British national grid reference system, sometimes known as OSGB36, used by the Ordnance Survey.) Geo-coordinates	Notes	Entry number (Note: The "List Entry Number" is a unique number assigned to each listed building and scheduled monument by Historic England.)	Image	Wikidata
Cheeseman's Farm	II	Alland Grange Lane			7 October 1986	TR3239166946; 51°21′15″N 1°20′10″E		1223803	Upload Photo	Q26518047
Acol Farmhouse	II	The Street			7 October 1986	TR3071367144; 51°21′23″N 1°18′44″E		1267108	Upload Photo	Q26557534
Barn About 10 Metres North West of Egerton Manor	II	The Street			7 October 1986	TR3077767282; 51°21′28″N 1°18′48″E		1223805	Upload Photo	Q26518049
Egerton Manor	II	The Street			11 October 1963	TR3079267268; 51°21′27″N 1°18′49″E		1267107	Upload Photo	Q26557533
Granary About 20 Metres South of Acol Farmhouse	II	The Street			7 October 1986	TR3073767110; 51°21′22″N 1°18′45″E		1267109	Upload Photo	Q26557535

== See also ==
- Grade I listed buildings in Kent
- Grade II* listed buildings in Kent

== Sources ==
- Newman, John (2013) [1969], Kent: North-East and East, The Buildings of England, New Haven and London: Yale University Press, ISBN 978-0-300-18506-5
