= Margate Birchington =

Ward of Margate Municipal District

Margate Birchington was a ward of Margate Municipal District prior to 1973. When the Municipal District was included in the Thanet District in 1974, Birchington ward elected 5 councillors to the new Borough at the elections of 1973 and 1976. In 2025 there was still two wards named Birchington South and Birchington North.

1973 Election

Margate Birchington ward
Party	Candidate	Votes	%	±%
Independent	Bill Dawson	1,947	42.3%	
Independent	Bill Kemp	1,516	32.9%	
Conservative	A Whewell	1,496	32.5%	
Independent	W Wanstall	1,486	32.3%	
Independent	D Bentley	1,236	32.3%	
Conservative	C Hibberd	1,222	26.6%	
Conservative	N Thomas	1,222	26.5%	
Conservative	L Farrington	1,166	25.3%	
Conservative	J Tobutt	1,113	24.2%	
Independent	G Abrahams	918	19.9%	
Liberal	P Bloore	806	17.5%	
Liberal	F Macpherson	732	15.9%	
Liberal	G Williams	404	8.8%	
Labour	M Lowe	353	7.7%	
Labour	J Amor	296	6.4%	
Labour	R Watts	285	6.2%	
Labour	E Stacey	260	5.6%	
Labour	A Deas	241	5.24%	
Majority		722,291,271,261,11		
Turnout		4,602	64.9	7,085

1976 Election

Birchington ward
Party	Candidate	Votes	%	±%
Independent	Bill Dawson	2,030	54.6%	+12.3%
Independent	W Wanstall	1,829	49.2%	+16.9%
Independent	N Hudson	1,709	45.9%	+26.0% Gain from Conservative
Independent	Bill Kemp	1,695	45.6%	+12.7%
Independent	D Bentley	1,634	44.0%	+17.1%
Conservative	A Whewell	1,457	39.2%	+6.7% Lost to Independent
Conservative	C Hibberd	1,213	32.6%	+6.0%
Conservative	H Betts	1,177	31.7%	+5.2%
Conservative	P Queen	1,113	29.9%	+4.2%
Conservative	F Buch	1,091	29.4%	+5.2%
Liberal	P Bloore	497	13.4%	−4.1%
Liberal	F Macpherson	462	12.4%	−3.5%
Liberal	H Bradbury	316	8.5%	−0.3%
Labour	G Smithers	187	5.0%	−2.7%
Majority		573,372,252,238,177		
Turnout		3,716	59.2	6,277

The election of 1979 was fought on revised boundaries and Birchington ward had been split between Birchington West and Birchington East, each electing two councillors.
