= Monkton, Kent =

Village in Kent, England

Coordinates: 51.3394°N 1.2792°E

Monkton
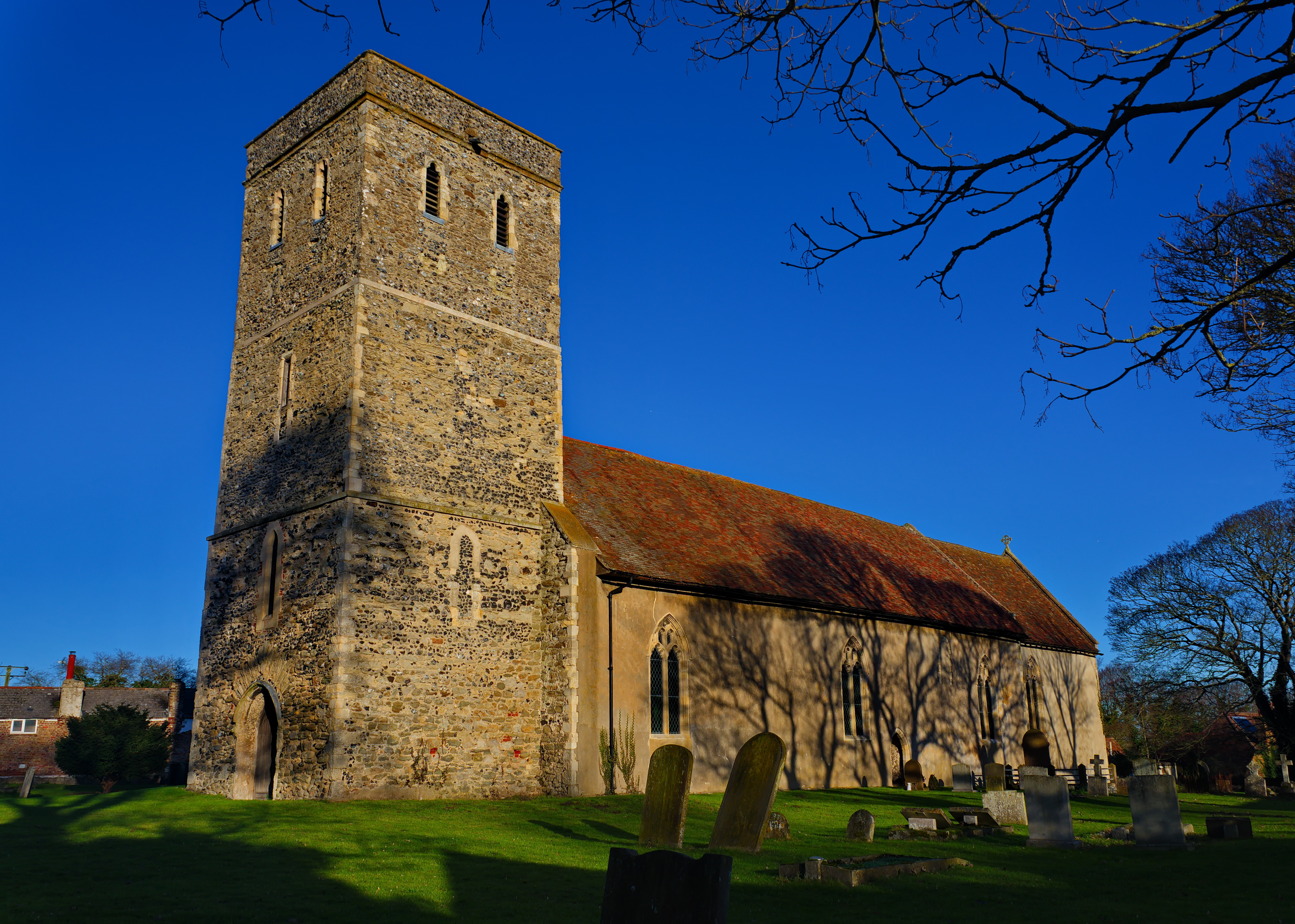
- St Mary Magdalene Church from the south

- Location within Kent
- Interactive map of Monkton
- Population: 661 (2011)
- OS grid reference: TR286649
- Civil parish: Monkton
- District: Thanet
- Shire county: Kent
- Region: South East
- Country: England
- Sovereign state: United Kingdom
- Post town: RAMSGATE
- Postcode district: CT12
- Dialling code: 01843
- Police: Kent
- Fire: Kent
- Ambulance: South East Coast
- UK Parliament: Herne Bay and Sandwich

Monkton is a village and civil parish in the Thanet District of Kent, England. The village is located at the south-west edge of the Isle of Thanet and is situated mainly along the B2047 road, leading off the A253 road between Canterbury and Ramsgate. The civil parish stretches south to the River Stour and northwards towards Acol. The hamlet of Gore Street is included in the parish.

== Community ==
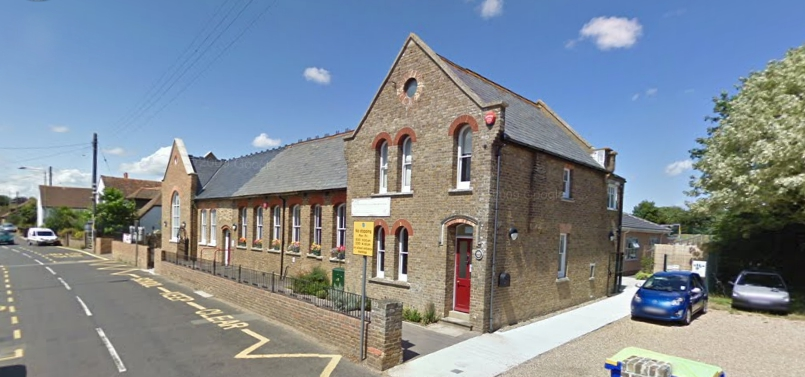
Monkton Primary School

Monkton was subject to an explosion during 2007, and was largely evacuated as a result. Kent Fire and Rescue Service said that crews were faced with "a well developed fire in a large single-storey building", which was among the largest in the village.

Monkton Nature Reserve, run by the environmental charity, Thanet Countryside Trust, is situated on chalk hills to the north of the village. The reserve is set in a 16-acre (65,000 m^{2}) abandoned chalk quarry which has been reclaimed by nature. It is notable for its geology and many important habitats, a pond and rare orchids. It also houses the Thanet Astronomical Observatory and the first artificial bat cave built in the UK. Facilities include field centre with a museum, reference library, bookshop and picnic site.

Monkton Church of England Primary School is situated in the village. The school was purpose built in 1872 and was extended and modernised in 2007. It currently teaches 109 pupils from 4 to 11 years. In 2007 the school achieved an Ofsted Inspection rating of Grade 2 'Good' overall.

== Church ==
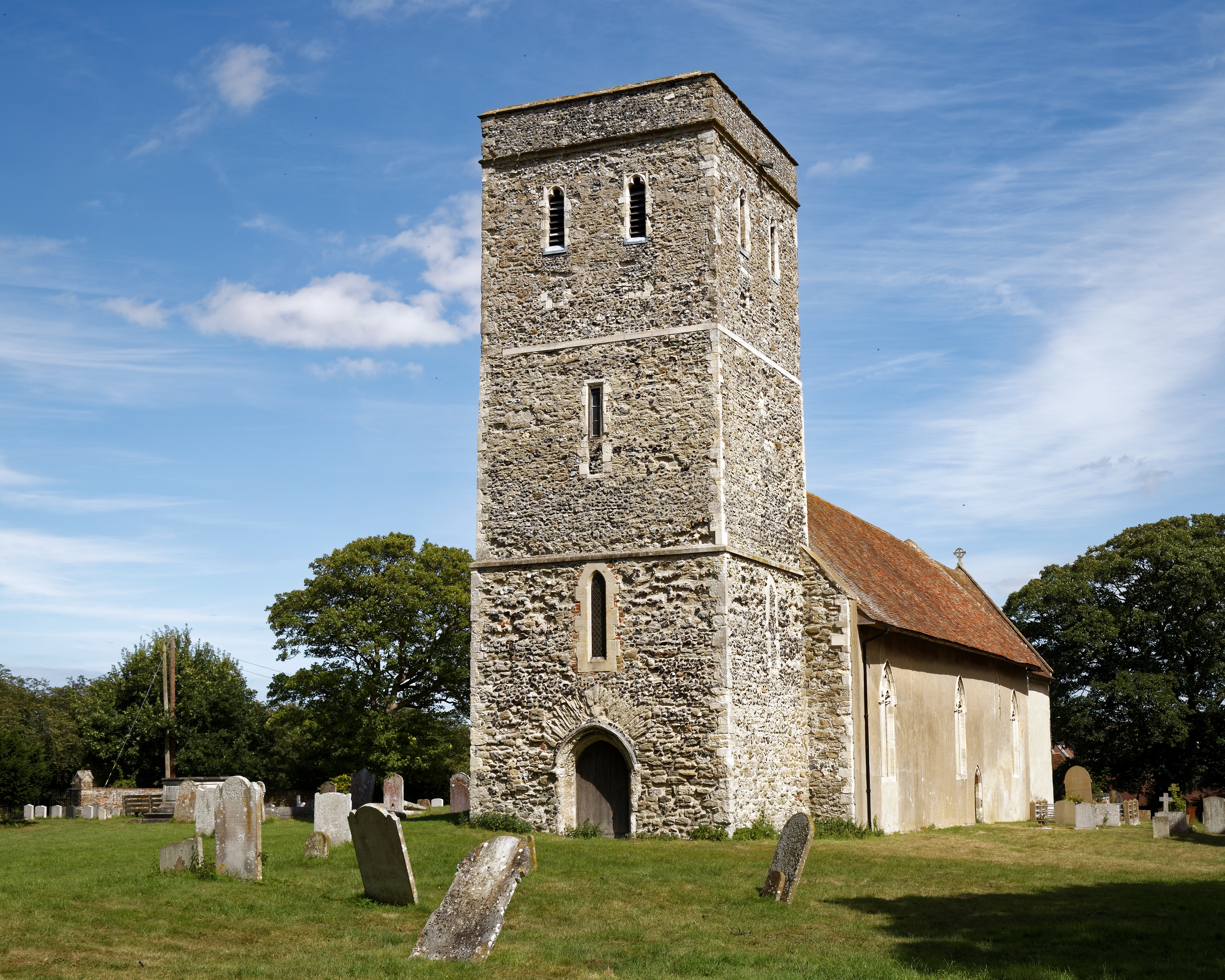
The parish church of St Mary Magdalene. The top stage of the tower was added in the 15th century

The 12th-century Anglican parish church is dedicated to St Mary Magdalene, and was largely rebuilt in the 15th century. This included the north porch and an extension of the tower, taking it to its current height; the north aisle was also blocked up, as well as new windows inserted. A church on the site was recorded on the Domesday survey, and the church is the smallest of the remaining seven ancient Thanet churches. The roof dates to the 15th century also. The churchyard is surrounded by stone walls, with multiple gates to enter through.

== See also ==
- Listed buildings in Monkton, Kent
