= 2023 Thanet District Council election =

2023 English local government election

- 4 May 2023

All 56 seats to Thanet District Council 29 seats needed for a majority
	First party	Second party	Third party
Leader	Rick Everitt	Ash Ashbee
Party	Labour	Conservative	Green
Last election	20 seats, 30.6%	25 seats, 38.1%	3 seats, 9.2%
Seats won	30	17	5
Seat change	▲10	▼8	▲2
Popular vote	29,134	23,402	11,418
Percentage	40.4%	32.4%	15.8%
Swing	▲9.8%	▼5.7%	▲6.6%
	Fourth party	Fifth party
Party	Thanet Ind.	Independent
Last election	7 seats, 9.8%	1 seat, 4.3%
Seats won	3	1
Seat change	▼4	Steady
Popular vote	4,854	2,302
Percentage	6.7%	3.2%
Swing	▼3.1%	▼1.1%
- Winner of each seat at the 2023 Thanet District Council election.
Leader before election
Ash Ashbee
Conservative
No overall control (Note: Conservative minority.)
Leader after election
Rick Everitt
Labour

The 2023 Thanet District Council election took place on 4 May 2023 to elect members of Thanet District Council in Kent, England. This was on the same day as other local elections across England.

The council was under no overall control prior to the election, being led by Conservative councillor Ash Ashbee. Labour won a majority of the seats. Ash Ashbee lost her seat. Labour group leader Rick Everitt was appointed leader of the council at the subsequent annual council meeting on 18 May 2023.

== Summary ==
The overall results were:

=== Election result ===
2023 Thanet District Council Election
Party	Candidates	Seats	Gains	Losses	Net gain/loss	Seats %	Votes %	Votes	+/−
Labour	56	30	11	1	▲10	53.6	40.4	29,134	+9.8
Conservative	51	17	0	8	▼8	30.4	32.4	23,402	-5.7
Green	30	5	2	0	▲2	8.9	15.8	11,418	-0.3
Thanet Independents	14	3	1	5	▼4	5.4	6.7	4,854	-3.1
Independent	8	1	1	1	Steady	1.8	3.2	2,302	-1.1
Liberal Democrats	5	0	0	0	Steady	0.0	1.1	767	-4.7
Reform	2	0	0	0	Steady	0.0	0.4	288	N/A

== Ward results ==
The Statement of Persons Nominated, which details the candidates standing in each ward, was released by Thanet District Council following the close of nominations on 5 April 2023. The results for each ward were as follows:

=== Beacon Road ===
Beacon Road (2 seats)
Party	Candidate	Votes	%	±%
Labour	Jenny Matterface	694	60.5	+26.4
Labour	Joanne Bright	620	54.0	+20.8
Conservative	Charlie Leys*	311	27.1	−3.3
Independent	Aram Rawf*	184	16.0	−18.1
Conservative	Barbara Young	176	15.3	−19.3
Green	Tina Gull	99	8.6	N/A
Turnout		1,148	34	
Rejected ballots		16	1.4	
Labour gain from Conservative		Swing		
Labour hold		Swing		

=== Birchington North ===
Birchington North (2 seats)
Party	Candidate	Votes	%	±%
Conservative	George Kup**	908	64.2	+1.8
Conservative	Reece Pugh	873	61.7	+5.4
Thanet Ind.	David Hart	384	10.9	N/A
Thanet Ind.	Simon Day*	382	27.0	−35.4
Labour	Colin Brown	379	26.8	+5.9
Green	Lucy Williams	328	23.2	−12.5
Labour	Mario Portelli	262	18.5	N/A
Turnout		1,415	43	
Rejected ballots		5	0.4	
Conservative hold		Swing		
Conservative hold		Swing		

George Kup was a sitting councillor in Birchington South

=== Birchington South ===
Birchington South (3 seats)
Party	Candidate	Votes	%	±%
Conservative	Phil Fellows*	814	53.3	+7.4
Conservative	Linda Wright*	726	47.6	+0.3
Conservative	Emma Dawson	699	45.8	+0.3
Labour	Colin Harvey	336	22.0	+3.0
Labour	David Ross	336	22.0	N/A
Independent	Paul Holton	273	17.9	N/A
Thanet Ind.	Glyn Parry	269	17.6	N/A
Labour	Anne Reszetniak	269	17.6	N/A
Green	Terry Macdonald	256	16.8	N/A
Turnout		1,526	30	
Rejected ballots		7	0.5	
Conservative hold		Swing		
Conservative hold		Swing		
Conservative hold		Swing		

=== Bradstowe ===
Bradstowe (2 seats)
Party	Candidate	Votes	%	±%
Conservative	George Rusiecki	525	41.0	−5.9
Conservative	Jill Bayford*	524	40.9	−9.5
Green	Steve Roberts	510	39.8	+13.4
Labour	Kay Dark	329	25.7	+0.6
Labour	Meg Harvey	326	25.4	+3.3
Liberal Democrats	Robert Stone	149	11.6	−5.0
Turnout		1,282	40	
Rejected ballots		6	0.5	
Conservative hold		Swing		
Conservative hold		Swing		

=== Central Harbour (Ramsgate) ===
Central Harbour (3 seats)
Party	Candidate	Votes	%	±%
Labour	Raushan Ara*	1,157	60.4	+12.4
Green	Becky Wing*	936	48.9	+8.5
Green	Tricia Austin*	852	44.5	N/A
Labour	Diane Heath	743	38.8	−7.6
Labour	Gita Sahni	712	37.2	+7.8
Conservative	John Penny	297	15.5	−2.8
Conservative	Andrew Chard	281	14.7	−2.3
Conservative	Toby Taylor	279	14.6	+0.7
Turnout		1,915	31	
Rejected ballots		11	0.6	
Labour hold		Swing		
Green gain from Labour		Swing		
Green hold		Swing		

=== Cliffsend & Pegwell ===
Cliffsend & Pegwell (2 seats)
Party	Candidate	Votes	%	±%
Conservative	Brenda Rogers*	571	40.5	−4.3
Conservative	John Davis	516	36.6	−4.6
Green	Vitas Bowyer	374	26.5	+4.4
Green	Tim Spencer	329	23.3	N/A
Labour	Peter Heath	278	19.7	+1.2
Labour	Laurie Hudson	265	18.8	+3.1
Independent	Grahame Birchall	223	15.8	−3.4
Thanet Ind.	Beryl Harrison	135	9.6	N/A
Liberal Democrats	Robert Wright	45	3.2	N/A
Turnout		1,409	35	
Rejected ballots		2	0.1	
Conservative hold		Swing		
Conservative hold		Swing		

=== Cliftonville East ===
Cliftonville East (3 seats)
Party	Candidate	Votes	%	±%
Conservative	Barry Manners	985	54.2	−10.9
Conservative	Marc Rattigan	912	50.2	−7.4
Conservative	Cedric Towning*	852	46.9	−5.8
Labour	Donald Challinger	586	32.2	+7.4
Green	Jessica Lauren	541	29.8	N/A
Labour	Barbara McCulloch	534	29.4	+6.7
Labour	Barry Lewis	511	28.1	+7.0
Turnout		1,818	35	
Rejected ballots		5	0.3	
Conservative hold		Swing		
Conservative hold		Swing		
Conservative hold		Swing		

=== Cliftonville West ===
Cliftonville West (3 seats)
Party	Candidate	Votes	%	±%
Labour	Alan Currie*	972	61.3	+14.9
Labour	Heather Keen*	901	56.8	+13.8
Labour	Harry Scobie*	872	55.0	+12.4
Green	Matt Shoul	560	35.3	+7.0
Conservative	Nickie Holding	278	17.5	+1.8
Conservative	Avril Towning	270	17.0	+3.6
Conservative	Ross Holding	246	15.5	+0.1
Thanet Ind.	Gary-Paul Derriman	170	10.7	−10.2
Turnout		1,585	27	
Rejected ballots		6	0.4	
Labour hold		Swing		
Labour hold		Swing		
Labour hold		Swing		

=== Dane Valley ===
Dane Valley (3 seats)
Party	Candidate	Votes	%	±%
Labour	Ruth Duckworth*	754	59.1	+26.9
Labour	Jack Packman	719	56.4	+27.6
Labour	Martin Boyd	709	55.6	+25.0
Conservative	Mike Smith	336	26.4	−3.5
Green	Chris Newman	333	26.1	N/A
Thanet Ind.	David Wallin*	296	23.2	−23.3
Turnout		1,275	24	
Rejected ballots		6	0.5	
Labour hold		Swing		
Labour gain from Thanet Ind.		Swing		
Labour gain from Thanet Ind.		Swing		

=== Eastcliff ===
Eastcliff (3 seats)
Party	Candidate	Votes	%	±%
Labour	Helen Crittenden*	811	59.4	+14.4
Labour	Corinna Huxley*	775	56.7	+14.2
Labour	Steve Albon*	741	54.2	+7.7
Green	Tony Uden	445	32.6	−6.7
Conservative	Peter Sinden	304	22.3	+2.8
Conservative	Gerry O'Donnell	291	21.3	+2.0
Conservative	Morgan Harris	290	21.2	+3.2
Turnout		1,366	25	
Rejected ballots		4	0.3	
Labour hold		Swing		
Labour hold		Swing		
Labour hold		Swing		

=== Garlinge ===
Garlinge (2 seats)
Party	Candidate	Votes	%	±%
Thanet Ind.	John Worrow	581	53.6	+19.2
Thanet Ind.	John Dennis*	509	47.0	+1.0
Conservative	Kerry Boyd*	253	23.4	−16.3
Labour	Maria Castellina	239	22.1	+4.3
Labour	Stephen Fenning	199	18.4	+2.4
Green	Bernard Kirkham	108	10.0	N/A
Turnout		1,083	29	
Rejected ballots		4	0.4	
Thanet Ind. hold		Swing		
Thanet Ind. gain from Conservative		Swing		

=== Kingsgate ===
Kingsgate (1 seat)
Party	Candidate	Votes	%	±%
Independent	Alan Munns	366	49.8	N/A
Conservative	Robert Bayford	241	32.8	−34.6
Labour	Howard Green	128	17.4	−15.2
Turnout		735	42	
Rejected ballots		2	0.3	
Independent gain from Conservative		Swing		

=== Margate Central ===
Margate Central (2 seats)
Party	Candidate	Votes	%	±%
Labour	Helen Whitehead*	504	60.1	+6.8
Labour	Rob Yates*	481	57.3	+7.4
Green	Alanna McGill-Tagg	245	29.2	+10.0
Conservative	Barry Millen	154	18.4	+3.5
Independent	John Finnegan	138	16.4	N/A
Turnout		839	22	
Rejected ballots		1	0.1	
Labour hold		Swing		
Labour hold		Swing		

=== Nethercourt ===
Nethercourt (2 seats)
Party	Candidate	Votes	%	±%
Labour	Anne-Marie Nixey*	574	50.7	+6.6
Labour	David Green	547	48.3	+12.7
Conservative	Michael Crees	299	26.4	−4.4
Conservative	Seth Stephenson	261	23.1	−4.0
Green	Michelle Thomas	221	19.5	−2.1
Reform	James Hose	195	17.2	N/A
Turnout		1,132	32	
Rejected ballots		9	0.8	
Labour hold		Swing		
Labour hold		Swing		

=== Newington ===
Newington (2 seats)
Party	Candidate	Votes	%	±%
Labour	Pat Moore	414	59.0	+4.8
Labour	Rick Everitt*	393	56.0	+8.0
Conservative	Trevor Shonk*	214	30.5	+5.8
Conservative	Ben Harris	194	27.6	+3.8
Green	Phil Shotton	94	13.4	−14.1
Turnout		702	19	
Rejected ballots		7	1.0	
Labour hold		Swing		
Labour hold		Swing		

=== Northwood ===
Northwood (3 seats)
Party	Candidate	Votes	%	±%
Labour	Jim Driver	563	46.4	+15.1
Labour	Will Scobie	554	45.6	+14.6
Labour	Debra Owen-Hughes	553	45.6	+16.7
Conservative	Keith Clark	312	25.7	+3.5
Conservative	David Spicer	282	23.2	+5.5
Conservative	Sandra Spicer	278	22.9	+5.4
Thanet Ind.	Stuart Piper*	270	22.2	−21.3
Thanet Ind.	Lynda Piper*	264	21.7	−20.0
Thanet Ind.	Christina Collins	230	18.9	−16.9
Green	Mike White	119	9.8	
Turnout		1,214	25	
Labour gain from Thanet Ind.		Swing		
Labour gain from Thanet Ind.		Swing		
Labour gain from Thanet Ind.		Swing		

=== Salmestone ===
Salmestone (2 seats)
Party	Candidate	Votes	%	±%
Labour	Katie Pope	491	53.9	+22.0
Labour	Leo Britcher	470	51.6	+22.5
Conservative	Lisa Shearer	328	36.0	+9.0
Green	Fi O'Connor	214	23.5	N/A
Turnout		911	23	
Rejected ballots		6	0.7	
Labour hold		Swing		
Labour hold		Swing		

=== Sir Moses Montefiore ===
Sir Moses Montefiore (2 seats)
Party	Candidate	Votes	%	±%
Labour	Pat Makinson*	452	41.5	+3.2
Labour	Tony Ovenden	449	41.2	+3.8
Green	Clara Gibson	377	34.6	N/A
Green	Andy Stevens	350	32.1	N/A
Conservative	Marion Astley	250	22.9	−2.6
Conservative	Daphne Sharp	222	20.4	−3.1
Turnout		1,090	31	
Rejected ballots		14	1.3	
Labour hold		Swing		
Labour hold		Swing		

=== St Peters ===
St Peters (3 seats)
Party	Candidate	Votes	%	±%
Green	Mike Garner*	849	46.3	+6.3
Conservative	Paul Moore	664	36.2	−9.7
Green	Kevin Pressland	664	36.2	N/A
Conservative	Roy Dexter*	614	33.5	−13.2
Conservative	Ahsan Ashfaq	595	32.4	−7.3
Labour	Jason Evers	470	25.6	−4.3
Labour	David Cooper	440	24.0	−3.7
Labour	Mathew Thomas	381	20.8	N/A
Liberal Democrats	Gail Banks	215	11.7	−7.9
Turnout		1,834	34	
Rejected ballots		20	1.1	
Green hold		Swing		
Conservative hold		Swing		
Green gain from Conservative		Swing		

=== Thanet Villages ===
Thanet Villages (3 seats)
Party	Candidate	Votes	%	±%
Conservative	Sam Bambridge**	733	44.5	+7.5
Conservative	Abi-Leigh Barlow	672	40.8	+5.9
Green	Abi Smith*	658	40.0	+5.3
Green	Andy Isbister	522	31.7	N/A
Conservative	Karina Pugh	520	31.6	+4.9
Green	Thea Barrett	496	30.1	N/A
Labour	Jane Hetherington	266	16.2	+3.3
Labour	Sue Gyde	247	15.0	N/A
Labour	Maggie Nash	225	13.7	N/A
Liberal Democrats	Deborah Holmes	130	7.9	−25.0
Independent	Andy Local	130	7.9	N/A
Turnout		1,646	27	
Rejected ballots		8	0.5	
Conservative hold		Swing		
Conservative hold		Swing		
Green hold		Swing		

Sam Bambridge was a sitting councillor in Westgate-on-Sea

=== Viking ===
Viking (3 seats)
Party	Candidate	Votes	%	±%
Labour	Roopa Farooki	863	39.6	+9.6
Labour	Kristian Bright	786	36.0	+10.4
Conservative	John Nichols	786	36.0	−2.0
Conservative	Michael Bridges	783	35.9	−1.0
Labour	Elvira Orhan	700	32.1	N/A
Independent	Ruth Brackstone Bailey*	657	30.1	−7.1
Conservative	Horace Shrubb	636	29.1	−7.8
Green	Will Jarman	450	20.6	−8.1
Liberal Democrats	David Banks	228	10.4	−3.1
Turnout		2,182	39	
Rejected ballots		25	1.1	
Labour gain from Conservative		Swing		
Labour gain from Independent		Swing		
Conservative hold		Swing		

=== Westbrook ===
Westbrook (2 seats)
Party	Candidate	Votes	%	±%
Labour	Elysa D'Abbro	451	44.5	+21.2
Labour	John Edwards	385	38.0	+16.0
Conservative	Ash Ashbee*	382	37.7	−5.4
Conservative	David Parsons	283	27.9	−17.0
Green	Ken Watkins	162	16.0	−11.3
Thanet Ind.	Mark Bray	160	15.8	N/A
Reform	Amelia Randall	93	9.2	N/A
Turnout		1,013	31	
Rejected ballots		3	0.3	
Labour gain from Conservative		Swing		
Labour gain from Conservative		Swing		

=== Westgate-on-Sea ===
Westgate-on-Sea (3 seats)
Party	Candidate	Votes	%	±%
Thanet Ind.	Bertie Braidwood*	789	47.2	+10.4
Conservative	Matthew Scott*	576	34.4	−3.3
Labour	David Donaldson	525	31.4	+10.1
Conservative	Jane Ashbee-Welch	483	28.9	−6.3
Labour	Nicola Morgan	468	28.0	+6.5
Thanet Ind.	Peter Evans	415	24.8	N/A
Conservative	Roger Smythe	364	21.8	−9.3
Independent	Thomas King	331	19.8	N/A
Green	Sarah Jarman	326	19.5	−8.2
Labour	Paul Upex	325	19.4	N/A
Turnout		1,673	31	
Rejected ballots		3	0.2	
Thanet Ind. hold		Swing		
Conservative hold		Swing		
Labour gain from Conservative		Swing		

== Changes 2023–2027 ==
- Abi-Leigh Barlow, elected as a Conservative in 2023, quit the Conservative Party to sit as a Labour councillor on 13 February 2024. She later became known as Marlène Dasburg, continuing to represent the ward as a Labour councillor.
- The Thanet Independent Group, formed in 2018, dissolved during 2025; its remaining members, including Garlinge councillor John Dennis and Westgate-on-Sea councillor Bertie Braidwood, continued to sit as independents.
- Barry Manners, elected as a Conservative in 2023, was suspended from the Conservative group on 1 May 2025 for backing an independent candidate over the Conservative candidate in the Thanet Villages by-election, and resigned from the group on 6 May 2025 to sit as an independent.
- Rob Yates, elected as a Labour councillor in 2023 and serving as Cabinet Member for Corporate Services, resigned from the Labour Party to join the Green Party on 19 September 2025.
- Barry Manners, sitting as an independent since May 2025, joined Reform UK on 14 January 2026.
- Marc Rattigan, elected as a Conservative in 2023, and John Dennis, sitting as an independent since the Thanet Independent Group's dissolution, both joined Reform UK on 24 February 2026.
- On 16 July 2026 the government confirmed that Thanet District Council, along with Kent's other district and borough councils and Kent County Council, would be abolished and replaced by new unitary authorities as part of local government reorganisation in Kent, with Thanet forming part of a new authority covering Canterbury, Thanet and Dover; elections to the new councils are due in 2027, with the new authorities taking over full responsibilities on 1 April 2028.

=== By-elections ===
==== Thanet Villages ====
Thanet Villages by-election: 1 May 2025
Party	Candidate	Votes	%	±%
Reform	Peter Evans	781	37.8	N/A
Conservative	Ash Ashbee	433	21.0	−17.2
Thanet Ind.	Ian Driver	407	19.7	N/A
Green	Will Jarman	204	9.9	−24.4
Liberal Democrats	Deborah Holmes	116	5.6	−1.2
Labour	Bryan Harrod	107	5.2	−8.7
Independent	Grahame Birchall	17	0.8	N/A
Majority		348	16.8	N/A
Turnout		2,092	31.4	+4.4
Registered electors		6,674		
Reform gain from Conservative				

The by-election was triggered by the resignation of the sitting Conservative councillor, Sam Bambridge, who stood down on 14 March 2025 after ten years as a councillor to concentrate on her recruitment business.

==== Garlinge ====
Garlinge by-election: 30 October 2025
Party	Candidate	Votes	%	±%
Reform	Darren Oxborrow	348	44.6	N/A
Conservative	Kerry Boyd	250	32.0	+10.6
Labour	Bryan Harrod	62	7.9	−12.3
Green	Deb Shotton	61	7.8	−1.3
Liberal Democrats	Matthew Brown	36	4.6	N/A
Independent	Ian Driver	24	3.1	N/A
Majority		98	12.5	N/A
Turnout		781	21.1	−7.9
Registered electors		3,696		
Reform gain from Thanet Ind.				

The by-election was triggered by the resignation of the sitting Thanet Independents councillor, John Worrow, who stood down on 1 September 2025 citing plans to move away from the district.
