= Plant factory =

Closed system enabling year-round vegetable production

A plant factory is a closed growing system which enables a plantsman to achieve constant production of vegetables all year around. The facility utilizes artificial control of light, temperature, moisture, and carbon dioxide concentrations.

== See also ==
- Greenhouses
- Hydroponics
- Vertical farming
- Thanet Earth - An example of such a farm
