= Westgate-on-Sea =

Seaside town in Kent, England

Coordinates: 51°22′53″N 01°20′17″E

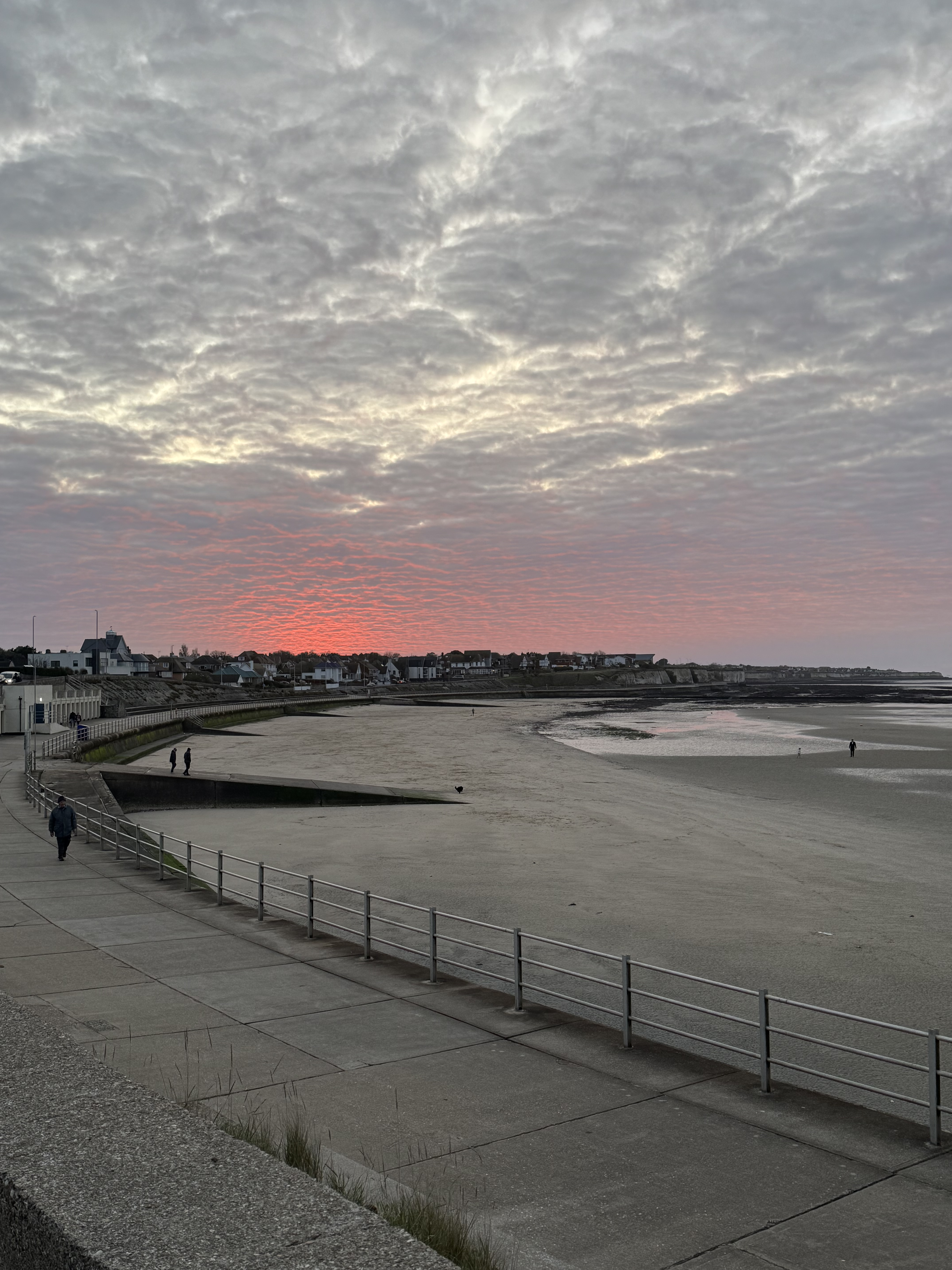
- West Bay

- Location within Kent
- Interactive map of Westgate-on-Sea
- Population: 7,517 (2021)
- OS grid reference: TR321701
- Civil parish: Westgate-on-Sea
- District: Thanet
- Shire county: Kent
- Region: South East
- Country: England
- Sovereign state: United Kingdom
- Post town: WESTGATE-ON-SEA
- Postcode district: CT8
- Dialling code: 01843
- Police: Kent
- Fire: Kent
- Ambulance: South East Coast
- UK Parliament: Herne Bay and Sandwich
- Website: Westgate-on-sea town council

Westgate-on-Sea is a seaside town and civil parish on the north-east coast of Kent, England. It is within the Thanet local government district and borders the larger seaside resort of Margate. Its two sandy beaches have remained a popular tourist attraction since the town's development in the 1860s from a small farming community. The town had a population of 7,517 at the 2021 Census.

The town was the location of a Royal Naval Air Service seaplane base at St Mildred's Bay, which defended the Thames Estuary coastal towns during World War I. The town is the subject of Sir John Betjeman's poem, "Westgate-on-Sea". Residents have included the 19th-century surgeon Sir Erasmus Wilson and former archbishop of Canterbury William Temple. The artist Sir William Quiller Orchardson painted several of his best-known pictures whilst living in Westgate-on-Sea. The British artist Louis Wain and his family lived there. The British composer Arnold Cooke attended the town's Streete Preparatory School in the early 20th century, and Eton headmaster Anthony Chenevix-Trench spent the earliest few years of his education in the town.

== History ==
The town inherited its name from the Westgate Manor, which was located in the area in medieval times. In the early 20th century, the remains of a Roman villa were discovered in what is now Beach Road, where a stream once used to flow. Fresh water can still be seen rising from the sand at low tide.

A Roman villa has been found in fields surrounding Westgate, with strong archaeological evidence of Roman activity between Quex Park East Side in Birchington and the Dent de Lion medieval gatehouse at Garlinge.

Before the 1860s, Westgate consisted of only a farm, a coastguard station (built 1791 and still standing in Old Boundary Road) and a few cottages for the crew that surrounded it. These were located beside the coast at St Mildred's Bay, named after Mildrith, Thanet's patron saint and a one-time Abbess of Minster.

During the late 1860s, businessmen developed the area into a seaside resort for the upper to middle-classes. A stretch of sea wall, with promenade on top, was constructed around the beaches at St Mildred's Bay and West Bay, and the land divided into plots to be sold for what would become an exclusive development by the sea for wealthy metropolitan families within a gated community, rather than for occasional tourists. The opening of a railway station, in 1871, led to the rapid expansion of the population, which reached 2,738 by 1901. The demands of the increasing population led to the building of the parish churches of St. James in 1872 and St. Saviour in 1884. St. Saviour's was designed by the architect C.N. Beazley. In 1884 it was reported that Essex, on the other side of the Thames Estuary, was hit by a tremor so large that it caused the bells of St. James' Church to ring. In 1884, ownership of most of the resort passed to Coutts Bank, after the previous proprietors had gone bankrupt.

Around twenty schools were opened during the late 19th century, although many had only a few pupils or closed within a few years. The largest of the schools were Streete Court School, Wellington House Preparatory School and St Michael's School.

An early experiment with electric lighting took place in December 1878. Six Yablochkoff lamps – a type of arc light – were installed, they were powered by a Garrett engine and were lit for 96 hours. The running costs proved to be uneconomic: they cost £40 9s 5d compared to £16 15s 2d for gas lighting, and there were technical problems.

A school, Westgate College, was established in 1877 by William Bullock. It was renamed Ringslow College in 1879 and closed in 1885. Two clergymen, the Bull brothers, opened Wellington House school in the same building in 1886. It closed in 1970 and was demolished in 1972. Old boys included Doctor Who actor Jon Pertwee and cabinet minister John Profumo, known for his involvement in the Profumo affair. Streete Court School was opened in 1894 by John Vine Milne, the father of the author A. A. Milne. In the 1890s, the school was attended by St John Philby, the father of the spy Kim Philby.

The Coronation Bandstand was built by the cliff edge in 1903, at a cost of £350, to celebrate the coronation of King Edward VII. The following year, a group of French Ursuline nuns, who were banned from teaching in France, fled with some of their pupils to Westgate-on-Sea and established the Ursuline Convent School, which in 1995 was re-established as Ursuline College. In 1910, a Swiss-Gothic styled town hall was built. However, it was soon decided that the building could be put to better use, and in 1912, it was transformed into the Town Hall Cinema. In 1932, it was renamed the Carlton Cinema.

Westgate town centre, at the crossing of Station Road and St Mildred's Road

On 1 August 1914, after the outbreak of World War I, a Royal Navy seaplane base was opened by the coast to defend the Thames Estuary naval towns against attack. It was at first used for both seaplanes and landplanes, but due to landing problems, a separate landplane base was opened in Manston in 1916. After the war, the seaplane base was decommissioned, and the landplane base in Manston eventually became Kent International Airport. During the war, the Coronation Bandstand was converted into sleeping quarters for use by the Royal West Kent Regiment. In 1925, the bandstand was refurbished and reopened as the 600-seat Westgate Pavilion theatre. By 1931, the town's population had reached 4,554. During World War II, several schools were evacuated to inland areas, with some, such as Streete Court School, leaving the town permanently. On 24 August 1942, a German fighter pilot, Herbert Bischoff, was captured after being shot down and crash landing in a field adjacent to Linksfield Rd, just south of the town.

On 27 April 1944 a Liberator aircraft from the 392nd USAAF bombing group based in East Anglia near Wendling, Norfolk, crashed off the beach, adjacent to the Westgate Pavilion, with five of the crew killed and four injured in the crash. A special memorial service was held for the crew by the Mayor of Margate and veterans' organisations on 27 April 2009 at the war memorial overlooking the crash site.

In 1975, five historic church bells were transferred to St Saviour's Church from the Holy Cross Church in Canterbury, which had closed in 1972. Three of the bells date back to the early 17th century and one was cast in the 14th century. From the 1970s to the 1990s, the Westgate Pavilion was a bingo hall, after which it closed and became derelict. In 2001, a group of volunteers formed a charitable trust to repair the pavilion and it was eventually reopened as a theatre.

== Geography ==
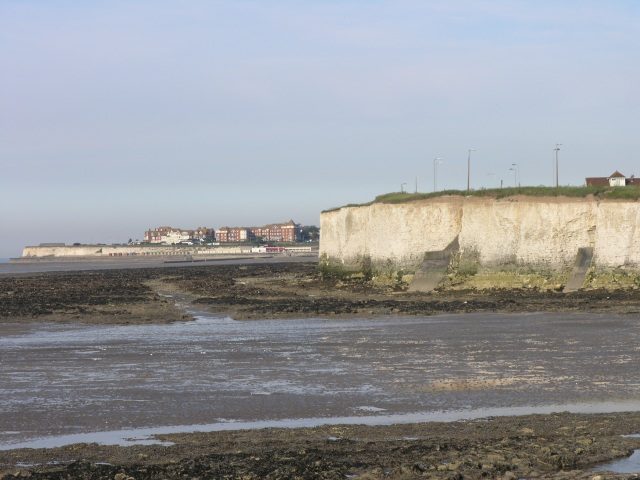
A view of Westgate-on-Sea from neighbouring Birchington-on-Sea

Westgate-on-Sea is located in northeast Kent, on the coast of the Thames Estuary. It is bordered by the town of Margate to the east and the village of Birchington-on-Sea to the west. The town is built beside the two sandy bays of St Mildred's Bay and West Bay, which both have a sea wall and groynes to prevent coastal flooding. Chalk cliffs are present in between the bays and either side of the bays. The whole of the northeast Kent coast has been designated a Site of Special Scientific Interest.

The town lies on the Isle of Thanet, a separate island from mainland Kent until around two hundred years ago, when the channel in between silted up. The geology of Thanet consists mainly of chalk, deposited when the area was below the sea. The Isle of Thanet was formed when the English Channel was formed by the sea breaking through, an island of chalk being left on the east side of the county. It was separated from the rest of Kent by the Wantsum Channel.

St Mildred's Bay

=== Climate ===
In East Kent, the warmest time of the year is July and August, when maximum temperatures average around 21 °C (70 °F). The coolest time of the year is January and February, when minimum temperatures average around 1 °C (34 °F). The average of maximum and minimum temperatures are around 1/2 °C higher than the national average. East Kent's average annual rainfall is about 728 millimetres (29 in), with October to January being the wettest months, compared with the national average of 838 millimetres (33 in).

These are average temperature and rainfall figures taken between 1971 and 2000 at the Met Office weather station in Wye, around 25 miles (40 km) southwest of Westgate-on-Sea:

Climate data for Wye Weather Station, Wye, Kent, England
| Month | Jan | Feb | Mar | Apr | May | Jun | Jul | Aug | Sep | Oct | Nov | Dec | Year |
|---|---|---|---|---|---|---|---|---|---|---|---|---|---|
| Mean daily maximum °C (°F) | 7.1 (44.8) | 7.2 (45.0) | 9.9 (49.8) | 12.1 (53.8) | 15.9 (60.6) | 18.7 (65.7) | 21.3 (70.3) | 21.6 (70.9) | 18.4 (65.1) | 14.5 (58.1) | 10.3 (50.5) | 8.0 (46.4) | 13.8 (56.8) |
| Mean daily minimum °C (°F) | 1.5 (34.7) | 1.3 (34.3) | 2.8 (37.0) | 4.3 (39.7) | 7.3 (45.1) | 9.9 (49.8) | 12.2 (54.0) | 12.2 (54.0) | 10.1 (50.2) | 7.2 (45.0) | 3.9 (39.0) | 2.6 (36.7) | 6.3 (43.3) |
| Average precipitation mm (inches) | 72.0 (2.83) | 44.7 (1.76) | 53.5 (2.11) | 50.8 (2.00) | 45.3 (1.78) | 51.8 (2.04) | 47.1 (1.85) | 55.9 (2.20) | 65.3 (2.57) | 85.4 (3.36) | 78.7 (3.10) | 77.3 (3.04) | 727.9 (28.66) |
Source: Met Office

Due to its climate and high grade agricultural soil, a range of cereal and vegetables can be grown in Westgate. In the past E. S Linington mainly grew cauliflower and raised dairy cattle. Quex Park in neighbouring Birchington now grows wheat, potatoes, maize and beans. Whether housing should be built on such high grade agricultural land in both Westgate and Birchington is a topic of local controversy.

=== Transport links ===
Westgate-on-Sea railway station is on the Chatham Main Line, which runs between Ramsgate in East Kent and London Victoria. Other stations on this line include Broadstairs, Margate, Herne Bay, Faversham, Gillingham, Rochester and Bromley South. Westgate-on-Sea is around 1 hour and 45 minutes to London by fast-service train. A National Express coach service runs between London Victoria and Ramsgate, and a selection of trains run to London's Cannon Street station, primarily for business commuting. There is a Stagecoach bus service running to neighbouring Birchington and Margate, and a service running between Broadstairs and Canterbury via Westgate-on-Sea. The A28 road runs between Hastings and Margate via Ashford, Canterbury, Birchington and Westgate-on-Sea. 4 miles (6 km) southwest of Westgate-on-Sea, the A28 crosses the A299 road, which leads along North Kent towards London, becoming the M2 motorway at Faversham.

== Demographics ==
Westgate-on-Sea compared (most figures rounded)
| 2021 United Kingdom census | Westgate-on-Sea | Thanet District | England |
|---|---|---|---|
| Total population | 7,517 | 140,587 | 56,490,048 |
| Foreign born | 6.7% | 9.8% | 17.4% |
| White | 95% | 93% | 81% |
| Asian | 1% | 2% | 10% |
| Black | 1% | 1% | 4% |
| Christian | 48% | 47% | 46% |
| Muslim | 1% | 2% | 7% |
| Hindu | 0% | 1% | 2% |
| No religion | 45% | 44% | 37% |
| Over 65 years old | 27% | 22% | 16% |
| Unemployed | 4% | 4% | 3% |

At the 2021 United Kingdom census, the Westgate-on-Sea electoral ward had 7,517 residents and 3,444 households. The ward has a relatively high percentage of retired people (30%) compared to England (21.5%) and a relatively low number of students (3% vs 5.6%). Nearly 4% of the population are 85 years and over compared to 2.4% of the overall population of England.

== Economy ==
As a seaside resort and border rural, the economy was mainly based around tourism; there are several hotels and guest houses near the seafront, to accommodate the influx of visitors during the summer. Many visitors often enjoy the coast, fields and shops. The High Street has a variety of shops and services including a butchers, a bakers and a greengrocers. The relatively elderly population has led to many health and social care jobs at local care homes. At the 2021 UK census, the most common occupation of employed Westgate residents was human health and social work activities (21%). Other common occupations were the wholesale and retail trades (14%), education (12%) and construction (10%).

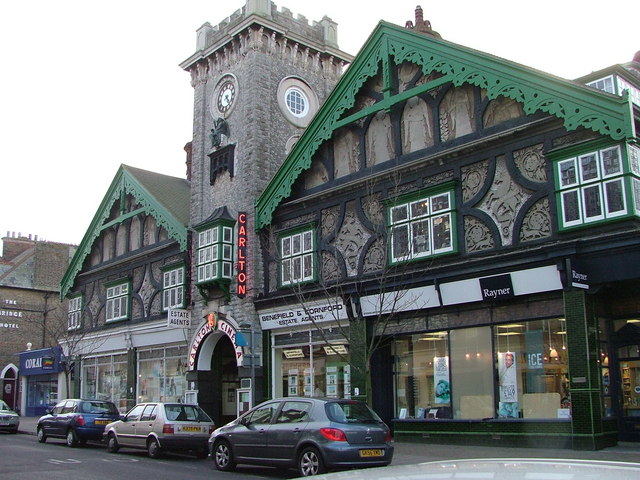
Carlton Cinema

== Politics ==
Westgate is a part of the parliamentary constituency of Herne Bay and Sandwich, which covers much of north-east Kent. The seat was created at the 2024 general election, when the Conservative Sir Roger Gale was elected. Before 2024 Westgate was a part of North Thanet.

The town is in the Thanet local government district. It is within the electoral ward of Westgate-on-Sea, which has three of the fifty-six seats on Thanet District Council. At the 2023 local elections, one seats each was won by the Conservatives, Labour and Thanet Independents.

In 2015 Thanet Council set up a parish council for the Westgate-on-Sea ward. The new council took office at its first meeting in May 2015 as Westgate-on-Sea Town Council.

== Education ==
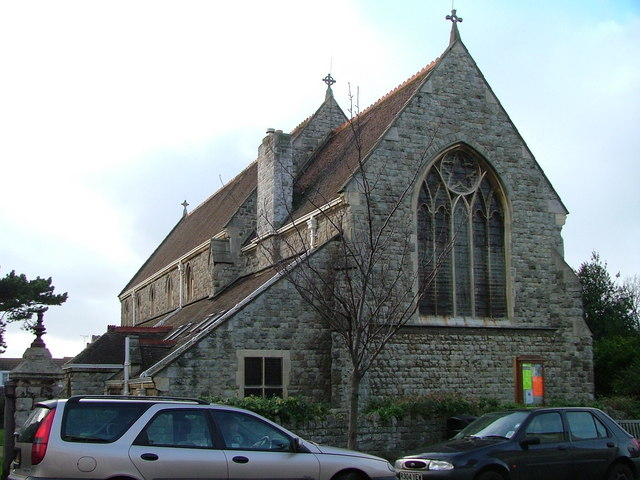
St Saviour's Church

The town's secondary school is Ursuline College, a specialist Sports College and Roman Catholic aided comprehensive school, with nearly 800 pupils and facilities for boarding students. In 2005, 32% of its pupils gained at least five GCSEs at grades A*–C including English and maths, ranking it 71st out of Kent's 120 secondary schools. Many secondary students commute to schools in other nearby towns, especially to the grammar schools in Ramsgate and Broadstairs. The Westgate College For Deaf People for students aged 16 and over closed on 11 December 2015. An inspection the previous month by the Care Quality Commission uncovered what the inspectors called "shocking examples of institutionalised failings and abuse" and the trust running the schools subsequently went into administration. The London House School of English provides English language courses for foreign students.

The primary state schools are St Crispin's Infant School and St Saviour's Church of England Primary School, which is owned by the church but run by Kent County Council. Chartfield School is an independent primary school, educating children from 3 to 11 years.

== Recreation ==
The town has sandy beaches at both St Mildred's Bay and West Bay. The larger of the beaches is at St Mildred's Bay, where it is possible to hire beach huts, deck chairs and jet-skis. The beach is a short distance from tennis courts and a golf putting course. At West Bay, there are many small rock pools, which are popular with children. Each beach has nearby cafés, restaurants and public houses, and a European Blue Flag Award is shared between them due to their cleanliness and safety.

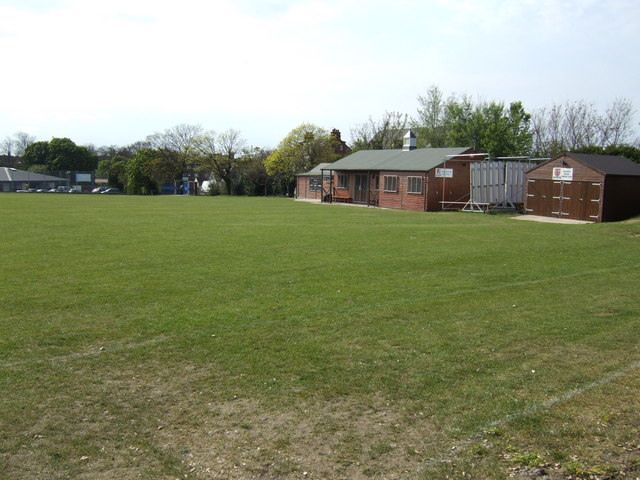
Westgate-on-Sea Cricket Club

The town centre has several Victorian canopied shops, a library and the three-screen Carlton Cinema. The Westgate Pavilion was formerly a venue for theatre, discos, yoga, indoor bowls and dance classes.It has been boarded up for several years

Formed in 1896, Westgate and Birchington Golf Club has an 18-hole 4,889-yard (4,471 m) course on the cliff tops between Westgate and Birchington. Based at Hawtreys Field, Westgate-on-Sea Cricket Club runs two Saturday teams and two Sunday teams. In the 2007 season, both Saturday teams played in the Kent Cricket Feeder League East; the Saturday 1st XI team in Division 1C and the Saturday 2nd XI in Division 2C. The Sunday teams do not play in competitive matches. In 2006, Thanet Council opened a free skatepark at the Lymington Road recreation ground. Designed by local young people, the park caters for skateboarders and in line skaters of all ages and skill levels.

== Local media ==
=== Newspapers ===
There are four local weekly newspapers providing news on the Thanet district area. Isle Of Thanet KM Extra is owned by the KM Group, and the Isle of Thanet Gazette, Thanet Adscene and Thanet Times are owned by Trinity Mirror. Isle Of Thanet KM Extra and Thanet Adscene are free newspapers, whereas the other two are paid-for. Kent on Sunday published newspapers covering this area until 2017.

=== Television ===
Local news and television programmes are provided by BBC South East and ITV Meridian. Television signals are received from the Dover TV transmitter and the Margate relay transmitter.

=== Radio ===
Local radio stations are BBC Radio Kent on 104.2 FM, Heart South on 95.9 FM and KMFM Thanet is a radio station on frequency 107.2FM, owned by the KM Group and previously known as TLR (Thanet Local Radio). Community radio station Academy FM (Thanet) launched in 2010 on 107.8.

== Notable residents ==
Residents of the town have included:

- the 19th-century surgeon Sir Erasmus Wilson, who spent the latter part of his life in the town until his death in 1884.
- former archbishop of Canterbury William Temple, who died in the town in 1944.
- In 1888, the astronomer and journalist Joseph Norman Lockyer built an observatory on the side of his house in Westgate-on-Sea, from where he took observations that formed the basis for his book, The Sun's Place in Nature.
- British composer Arnold Cooke attended Streete Preparatory School in the early 20th century.
- Ann Dowling, the first woman to be President of the Royal Academy of Engineering, attended Ursuline Convent School in the town.
- The artist Sir William Quiller Orchardson painted several of his most well-known pictures while living in Westgate-on-Sea.
- In 1957, suspected serial killer Dr John Bodkin Adams spent two weeks in hiding in the town (to escape the press) following his controversial acquittal at the Old Bailey.
- Louis Wain (1860–1939), the man who drew cats and illustrated many children's books, lived in Westgate between 1890 and 1917, at Adrian Square, then in 1895 he moved to Collinwood Terrace, now known as Westgate Bay Avenue.
- Actress Juliette Kaplan, known for her role as Pearl in the long running sitcom Last of the Summer Wine, lived here.

== See also ==
- Listed buildings in Westgate-on-Sea
