= Ursuline College (disambiguation) =

Ursuline College is a private, Catholic historically women's college in Pepper Pike, Ohio, US.

Ursuline College may also refer to:

- Brescia University College, a former Catholic women's college in London, Ontario, Canada that was known as Ursuline College from 1919 to 1963.
- Ursuline College, Westgate-on-Sea, a coeducational Catholic secondary school in Westgate-on-Sea, Kent, England
- Ursuline College Chatham, a coeducational Catholic secondary school in Chatham, Ontario, Canada
- Ursuline College Sligo, an all-girls Catholic secondary school in Sligo, Ireland
