= Thanet Earth =

Agriculture project in Kent, England

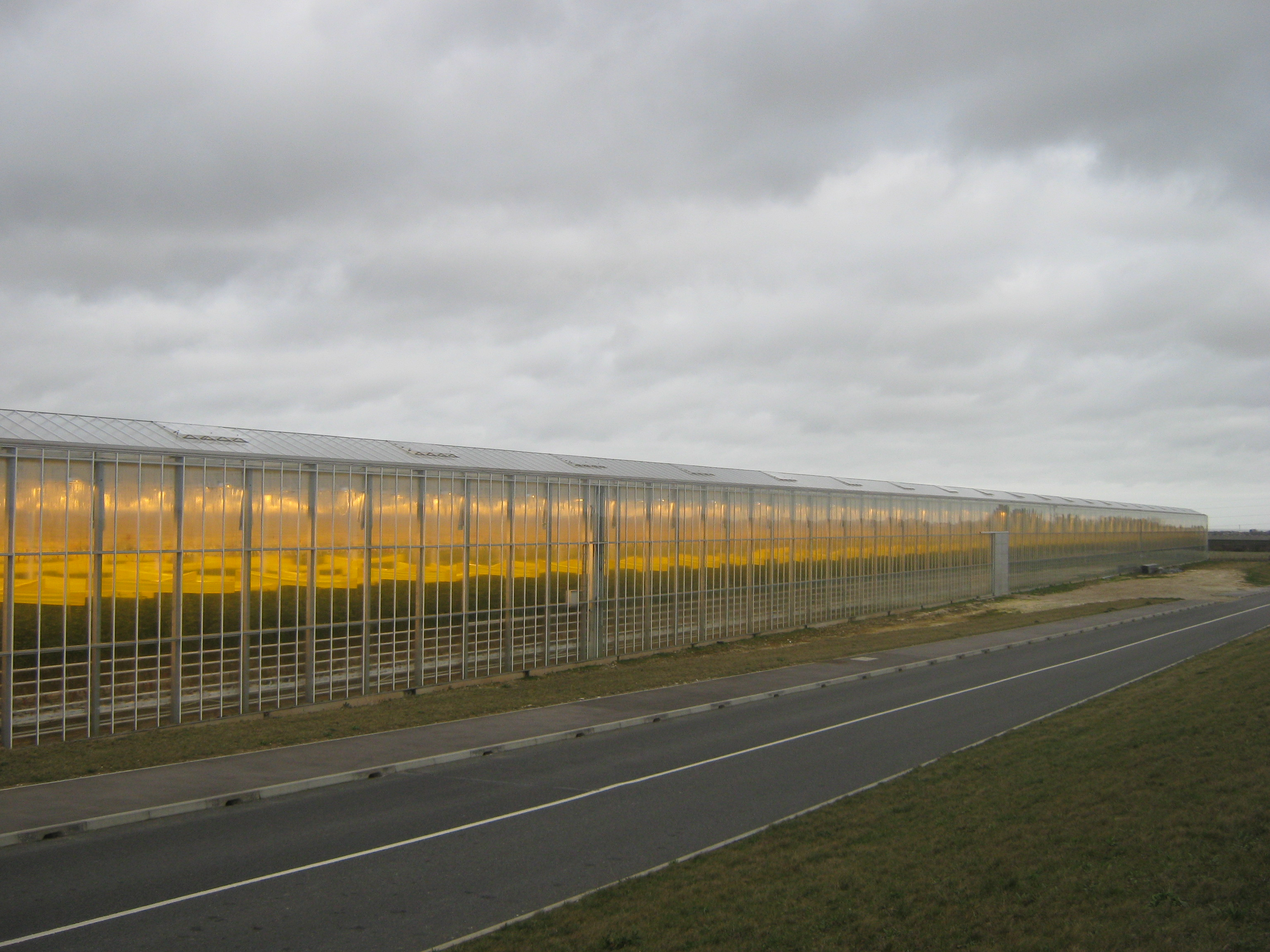
- Thanet Earth greenhouses

- Location within Kent
- Town/City: Thanet District
- Country: England
- Coordinates: 51.357°N 1.286°E
- Established: 2008

Thanet Earth is a large industrial agriculture and plant factory project consortium on the Isle of Thanet in Kent, England. It is the largest greenhouse complex in the UK, covering 90 hectares, or 220 acres (0.89 km^{2}) of land. The glasshouses produce approximately 400 million tomatoes, 24 million peppers and 30 million cucumbers a year, equal to roughly 12, 11 and 8 per cent respectively of Britain’s entire annual production of those salad ingredients. Thanet Earth's main customers are Asda, Sainsbury’s, Tesco, M&S and agency HRGO.

== Food production ==
The complex began producing in October 2008. Cucumbers and peppers are picked continuously from February to October, and tomatoes are harvested every day of the week, 52 weeks a year. As of 2025, it is also the only tomato grower in the UK to employ robotic pollination.

The UK's largest privately owned fresh produce supplier, Fresca Group Ltd, has a 50% stake in the trading business that sells all the crops grown at the site, Thanet Earth Marketing Limited. The remaining 50% of Thanet Earth Marketing Limited is owned by three salad growing specialist companies which each owns and operates a glasshouse at the site – Kaaij Greenhouses UK, Rainbow Growers and a six hectare glasshouse owned by A&A. Planning permission exists for a further four greenhouses on the site, making seven in total; in time for planting vine tomatoes in January 2013 they built an additional eight hectares of greenhouses

== Power ==
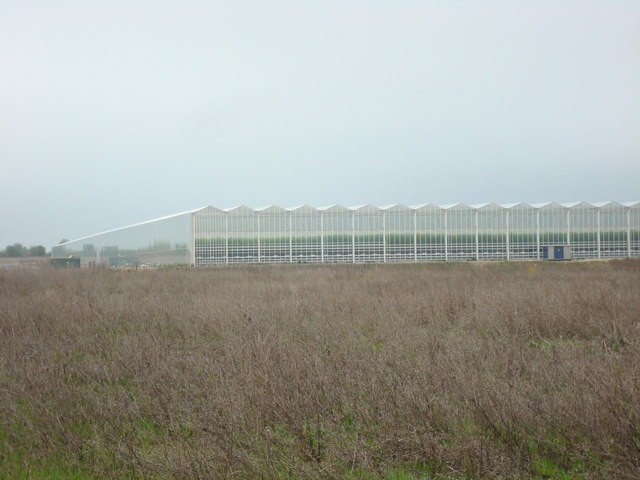
Thanet Earth greenhouses

The complex is powered by combined heat and power systems that create heat, power and carbon dioxide (which is absorbed by the plants) for the greenhouses. Through a partnership with a virtual power plant they also export their excess power to the grid and automatically add extra power to the grid at times of peak demand.

== Controversies ==
It was reported that during misty nights the lit glasshouses were a source of light pollution in the form of a clearly visible night glow. The company were quoted as saying that "For ventilation purposes we have to leave tiny gaps where the blinds meet. Even when the blinds are fully closed we estimate that approximately 2 per cent of area is uncovered."

== Media ==
As the first of its kind in the UK, the Thanet Earth project received minor, but national coverage.

== See also ==
- Thanet Offshore Wind Project
