= Garlinge =

Village in Kent, England

Coordinates: 51°22′41″N 1°21′24″E

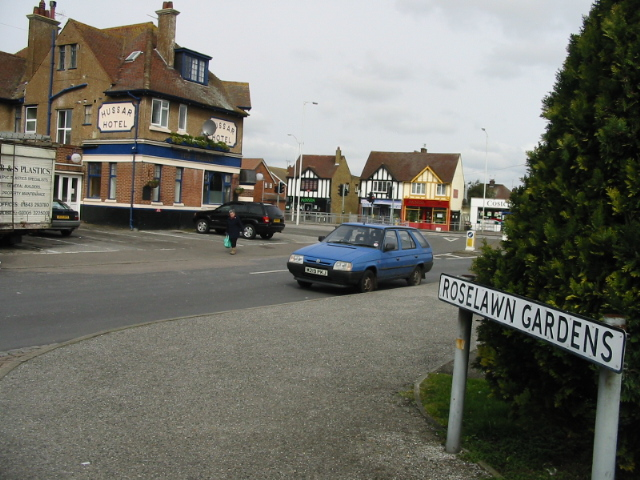
- Hussar Hotel, Garlinge, on the junction of High Street and the A28 Canterbury Road

- Location within Kent
- Population: 4,849 (Garlinge ward 2011)
- OS grid reference: TR335697
  - London: 65 mi (105 km)
- District: Thanet
- Shire county: Kent
- Region: South East
- Country: England
- Sovereign state: United Kingdom
- Post town: MARGATE
- Postcode district: CT9
- Dialling code: 01843
- Police: Kent
- Fire: Kent
- Ambulance: South East Coast
- UK Parliament: Herne Bay and Sandwich

Garlinge is a village and suburb of Margate, in the Thanet district, in Kent, England, situated 2 miles (3.2 km) southwest of the centre of the town.

== Amenities ==
There is a small selection of shops in the village: newsagent/off-licence, two hairdressers, bakery/cafe, pharmacy, a petrol station, a mini supermarket/post office and two car workshops. There are a number of restaurants and take aways, including a fish and chip shop. The village has two pubs – the Rodney on the High Street and the Hussar on Canterbury Road - the latter serves meals and has accommodation.

== History ==
Garlinge takes its name from the former Garling's Farm, which was owned by the London hospitals Bridewell and Bethlem.

The Dent-de-Lion gateway is a grade II* listed building, dating from the late 14th/early 15th century (c1380).

Garlinge developed with the arrival of the railway to Margate and steam-packets bringing holiday makers from London.

There was a Methodist Chapel in Garlinge by 1848. All Saints Church on Hartsdown Road, a Grade II listed building, was built in the early 1890s by Thomas Andrews of Margate, along with the former vicarage, also a listed building, designed by Edward Schroeder Prior.

In 1894 Garlinge became a civil parish, being formed from St John Rural, on 1 April 1935 the parish was abolished and merged with Margate and Ramsgate, part also went to form Broadstairs and St Peters, it became part of the Municipal Borough of Margate as part of a county review order. In 1931 the parish had a population of 590.

== Notable people ==
- Charles James Fox owned the Dent-de-Lion Gateway ancient monument.

== Demography ==
Garlinge compared
2001 UK Census	Garlinge ward	Thanet borough	England
Population	4,858	126,702	49,138,831
Foreign born	3.4%	5.1%	9.2%
White	98.8%	97.7%	90.9%
Unemployed	3.9%	4.4%	3.3%
Retired	16.7%	17.5%	13.5%

At the 2001 UK census, the Garlinge electoral ward had a population of 4,858. The ethnicity was 98.8% white, 0.6% mixed race, 0.3% Asian, 0.1% black and 0.2% other. The place of birth of residents was 96.6% United Kingdom, 0.6% Republic of Ireland, 1.1% other Western European countries, and 1.7% elsewhere. Religion was recorded as 76.3% Christian, 0.2% Buddhist, 0% Hindu, 0.1% Sikh, 0.3% Jewish, and 0.1% Muslim. 13.8% were recorded as having no religion, 0.2% had an alternative religion and 9.1% did not state their religion.

The economic activity of residents aged 16–74 was 34.5% in full-time employment, 13.5% in part-time employment, 8.4% self-employed, 3.9% unemployed, 2.8% students with jobs, 3.6% students without jobs, 16.7% retired, 8.4% looking after home or family, 5.7% permanently sick or disabled and 2.6% economically inactive for other reasons. The industry of employment of residents was 15.9% retail, 13.7% manufacturing, 9.9% construction, 9.5% real estate, 14.3% health and social work, 9.3% education, 7.9% transport and communications, 4.7% public administration, 4.6% hotels and restaurants, 2.2% finance, 1.6% agriculture and 6.4% other. Compared with national figures, the ward had a relatively high proportion of workers in construction, education, and health and social work. There were a relatively low proportion in real estate and finance. Of the ward's residents aged 16–74, 9.3% had a higher education qualification or the equivalent, compared with 19.9% nationwide.
