= Ursuline Sisters =

Ursuline Sisters can refer to one of several religious institutes:

- Ursulines, founded in Italy in 1535
- Society of the Sisters of Saint Ursula of the Blessed Virgin, established 1605
- Congregation of the Ursulines of the Agonizing Heart of Jesus (Grey Ursulines), est. 1920 (1908)
