= Ursuline High School =

Ursuline High School may refer to:

- Ursuline High School, Wimbledon, United Kingdom, a Roman Catholic secondary school for girls, established 1892
- Ursuline High School (Youngstown, Ohio), United States a Roman Catholic coeducational secondary school
- Ursuline High School (Santa Rosa, California), United States, a Roman Catholic secondary school for girls, established 1880 and closed in 2010
