= Ursuline Campus Schools =

Schools in Kentucky, United States

Coordinates: 38.2495°N 85.6759°W

Ursuline Campus Schools is a small system of schools located on one, 48-acre (190,000 m^{2}) campus on Lexington Road in Louisville, Kentucky. It consists of five schools:

- Sacred Heart Academy: Girls' High School
- Sacred Heart Model School: co-ed school, Grades K–8
- Ursuline Montessori School: Preschool that uses the Montessori method of education
- Ursuline Child Development Center: Preschool that uses traditional education methods
- Ursuline School for the Performing Arts: Performing Arts School for all ages – includes visual art, drama, music, and dance disciplines at all levels

== See also ==
- Ursuline Nuns of the Immaculate Conception
