= Charles Beazley =

British architect (1834–1897)

- Born: Charles Nightingale Beazley; 1834; Esher, Surrey, England
- Died: 1897 (aged 62–63); Brentford, Middlesex, England
- Occupation: Architect
- Practice: Beazley & Burrows

Charles Nightingale Beazley (1834–1897), was a British architect. His work spans the period 1853–97.

== Career ==
Beazley was articled to William Wardell in 1853 and was an RIBA student 1854–56. In 1856–58 he was an assistant to G.E. Street, who was the diocesan architect for the Church of England Diocese of Oxford. Beazley began independent practice in 1860, and from 1884 worked in partnership with H.W. Burrows. Like Street, Beazley worked on a number of commissions to restore Church of England parish churches and design new ones. In the 1870s and 1880s Beazley worked extensively in Westgate-on-Sea, Kent. He was made a Fellow of the RIBA in 1880 but resigned in 1897, the year of his death.

== Work ==
- St. Eadburg's parish church, Bicester, Oxfordshire: restoration, 1862–63
- St. Mark's parish church, Cold Ash, Berkshire, 1864–66
- St. Michael & All Angels parish church, Newton Purcell, Oxfordshire: restoration, 1875
- St. Mildred's parish church, Acol, Kent, 1879
- Ellingham, St Clement's Road, Westgate-on-Sea, Kent, 1883
- St. Saviour's parish church, Westgate-on-Sea, Kent, 1884

== Sources ==
- Brodie, Antonia; Felstead, Alison; Franklin, Jonathan; Pinfield, Leslie; Oldfield, Jane, eds. (2001). Directory of British Architects 1834-1914, A-K. London & New York: Continuum. p. 146. ISBN 0-8264-5513-1.
- Pevsner, Nikolaus (1966). The Buildings of England: Berkshire. Harmondsworth: Penguin Books. p. 117.
- Sherwood, Jennifer; Pevsner, Nikolaus (1974). The Buildings of England: Oxfordshire. Harmondsworth: Penguin Books. pp. 453, 717. ISBN 0-14-071045-0.
