= St. Ursula Academy =

St. Ursula Academy may refer to the following Catholic girls college preparatory schools in the United States:

- St. Ursula Academy (Cincinnati, Ohio)
- St. Ursula Academy (Toledo, Ohio)
