= Birchington East =

Defunct ward of Thanet Borough Council

Birchington East was a ward of Thanet Borough Council and was created in the boundary changes of 1979, and had previously been part of the Margate Birchington ward. In 2025 there was still two wards named Birchington South and Birchington North.

Councillors William Dawson and Wanstall transferred from Margate Birchington ward and contested and won the 1979 election.

1979 Election

Birchington East ward
| Party | Candidate | Votes | % | ±% |
|---|---|---|---|---|
| Independent | William Dawson | 1,561 | 49.8% | n/a |
| Independent | A Wanstall | 1,471 | 46.9% | n/a |
| Conservative | F Buch | 835 | 26.6% | n/a |
| Conservative | M Porter | 802 | 25.6% | n/a |
| Labour | M Lowe | 387 | 12.3% | n/a |
| Liberal | F McPherson | 353 | 11.3% | n/a |
| Liberal | P Bloore | 349 | 11.1% | n/a |
| Majority | | 726,669 | | |
| Turnout | | 3,136 | 70.9% | 4,421 |

1983 Election

Birchington East ward
| Party | Candidate | Votes | % | ±% |
|---|---|---|---|---|
| Independent | A Wanstall | 1,015 | 45.1% | −1.8% |
| Independent | William Dawson | 1,013 | 44.6% | −5.2% |
| Conservative | J Callaway | 816 | 36.3% | +9.7% |
| Labour | M Lowe | 259 | 11.5% | −0.8% |
| Labour | P Harrington | 220 | 9.8% | n/a |
| Liberal | J Hill | 159 | 7.1% | −4.2% |
| Liberal | N Stein | 159 | 7.1% | −4.0% |
| Majority | | 199,187 | | |
| Turnout | | 2,249 | 49.9% | 4,503 |

1987 Election

Birchington East ward
| Party | Candidate | Votes | % | ±% |
|---|---|---|---|---|
| Independent | William Dawson | 1,120 | 44.8% | +0.2% |
| Independent | C Johnson | 1,000 | 40.0% | −5.1% |
| Conservative | G Clark | 789 | 31.5% | −4.8% |
| Liberal | J Hill | 444 | 17.7% | +10.6% |
| Labour | D Conway | 149 | 6.0% | −5.5% |
| Liberal | V Hynes | 143 | 5.7% | −1.4% |
| Labour | J Simmons | 139 | 5.6% | −4.2% |
| Majority | | 331,211 | | |
| Turnout | | 2,502 | 45.2% | 5,535 |

1991 Election

Birchington East ward
| Party | Candidate | Votes | % | ±% |
|---|---|---|---|---|
| Conservative | J Warren | 1,092 | 49.0% | +17.5% |
| Conservative | C Chapman | 789 | 46.0% | +14.5% |
| Independent | P Francis | 693 | 31.1% | −13.7% |
| Labour | W East | 404 | 18.1% | +12.1% |
| Green | R Quested | 319 | 14.3% | n/a |
| Labour | J Simmons | 300 | 13.5% | +7.9% |
| Majority | | 339,331 | | |
| Turnout | | 2,227 | 44.3% | 5,028 |
