= Ursuline College, Westgate-on-Sea =

Coordinates: 51°22′39″N 1°19′38″E

Ursuline College
- Westgate-on-Sea, Kent, CT8 8LX; England

Information
- Type: Academy (formerly Private day and boarding)
- Motto: Serviam (I will serve)
- Religious affiliation: Roman Catholic (Ursuline)
- Established: 1904
- Local authority: Kent
- Department for Education URN: 141628 Tables
- Headteacher: Danielle Lancefield
- Gender: Coeducational (formerly Girls)
- Age: 11 to 19
- Enrolment: 780~
- Colours: green and silver
- Diocese: Roman Catholic Archdiocese of Southwark
- Website: http://www.ursuline.kent.sch.uk

Ursuline College (formerly Ursuline Convent School) is a Catholic comprehensive secondary school with academy status, located in Westgate-on-Sea, in north-east Kent, England, United Kingdom. Aimed at pupils aged 11 to 19, the college is based within the Ursuline and Catholic ethos, aiding and teaching its pupils within this regime.

== History ==
The school in Westgate-on-Sea was established in 1904 when a group of Ursuline Sisters fled Boulogne-sur-Mer with a number of their pupils. Although their school in Boulogne-sur-Mer had existed since 1624, laws passed in France had made it impossible for the Sisters to continue their work of Christian education in France.

Initially the school was set up as a boarding school for girls, meeting the needs of parents working in the Colonies or serving in the Forces. The school was based on the Ursuline movement, or, moreover, the Ursuline Community, which in turn was inherited from the actions of Angela Merici in Italy in 1535.

In 1995, following the sudden closure of the neighbouring St Augustine’s College (a Catholic independent day and boarding school for boys), the school became coeducational.

In mid-1998, due to social and local pressures from members of the prospective public, the school was reborn as an aided comprehensive for children aged 11 to 19. A separate school, St. Angela's, was born out of this disconnection, still providing a private education for its younger students, although this later also closed.

Over the ensuing decade, the school became increasingly involved with sport, specifically football and netball, and in 2006 became a Catholic Comprehensive Specialist Sports College.

In January 2015 the school converted to academy status.

== Ursuline mission statement and sisterhood ==
As part of the Ursuline regime, the school's mission statement includes the promotion of a generic positive regime and environment for its students.

Furthermore, the college relishes its sisterhood with the Ursulines and maintains good working relations with the other colleges, which can include foreign student exchange programs.

== Campus ==
The school includes the grade II listed Hatton House, which was built in 1886 as the home of William Jarrett, a tea planter and a chapel and cloisters constructed of Kentish ragstone.

The school is currently made up of five buildings:

- The main building (Hatton House)
- The new building (St. Ursula's)
- The new Information Technology building (St. Carlo Acutis)
- The sports centre (St. Joseph's)
- The Sixth Form Centre (St. Angela's)

== Notable alumni ==
- Rula Lenska (b. 1947) - actress known for her extensive television and theatre work.
- Dame Ann Dowling (b. 1952) - Head of the Department of Engineering, University of Cambridge (2009-2014) and President of the Royal Academy of Engineering
