= Acol, Kent =

Hamlet in Kent, England

Coordinates: 51.358°N 1.313°E

Acol
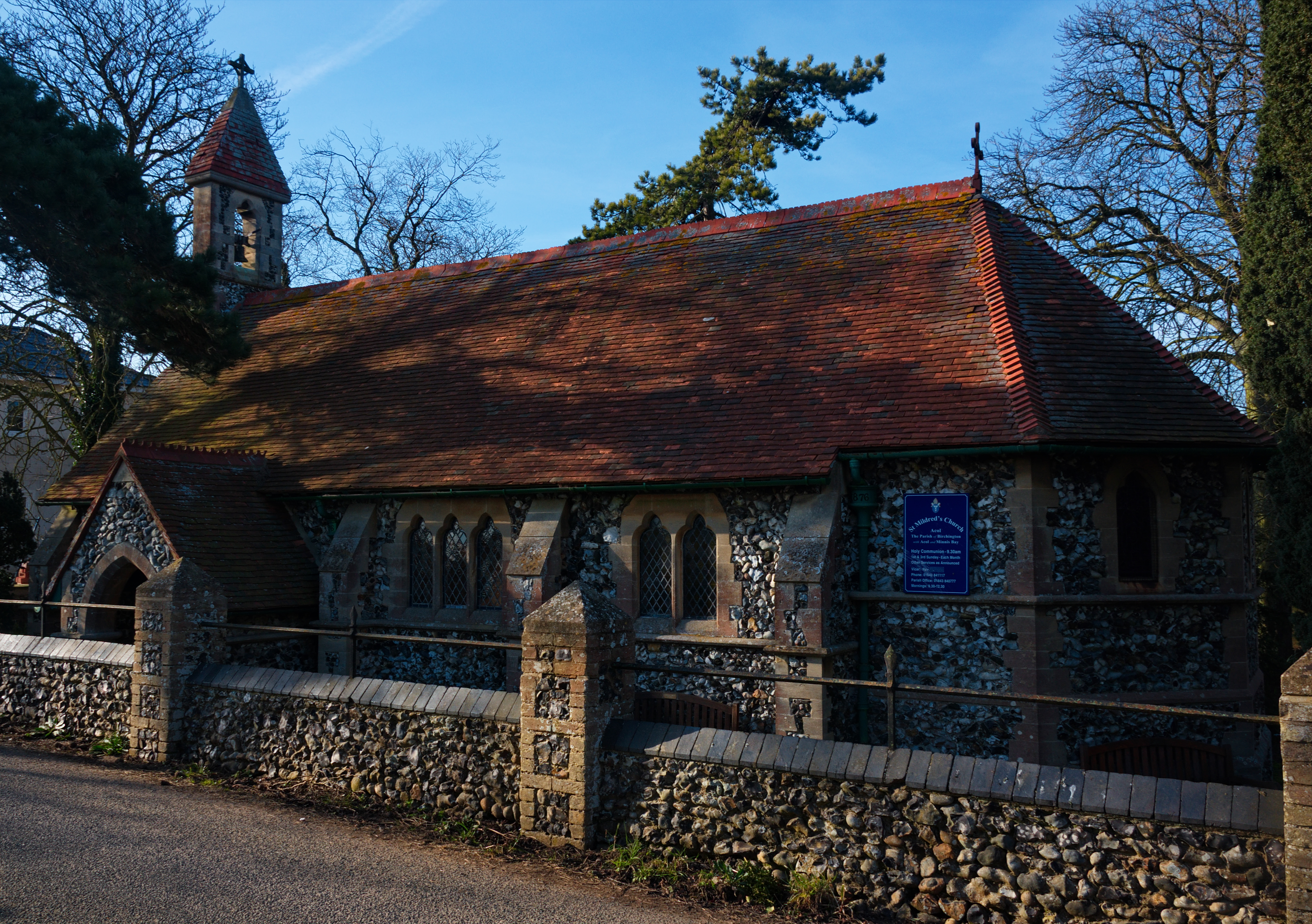
- St Mildred's Church, Acol

- Location within Kent
- Interactive map of Acol
- Population: 295 (2011 Census)
- OS grid reference: TR308673
- Civil parish: Acol
- District: Thanet
- Shire county: Kent
- Region: South East
- Country: England
- Sovereign state: United Kingdom
- Post town: BIRCHINGTON
- Postcode district: CT7
- Dialling code: 01843
- Police: Kent
- Fire: Kent
- Ambulance: South East Coast
- UK Parliament: Herne Bay and Sandwich

Acol (formerly Acholt) is a hamlet and civil parish in the Thanet District of Kent, England, about 1.5 miles (2.4 km) south of Birchington. It is one of the smallest communities in Kent, and over the years large parts of the parish have been transferred to other neighbouring communities. Acol is situated just north of the western end of the runway at Manston Airport.

== History ==
Acol was recorded in 1270 under the name Acholt, meaning Oak Wood.

The conditions for labourers throughout Kent at the end of the Napoleonic Wars deteriorated to the point where unrest brought about the start of the Swing Riots in 1833–4. At the same time, many labourers left Kent, often with the grateful assistance of their parish councils who did not want to keep supporting them, to take up new lives in the colonies in North America and particularly Australia and New Zealand.

About 1880, Henry Perry Cotton, of Quex Park north of Acol, developed land in Kilburn, London, naming one street Acol Road; there in the 1930s Acol Bridge Club members developed the Acol bidding system, formerly used by most British contract bridge players.

== St Mildred's Church ==
The Anglican parish church of St Mildred was designed by the architect C. N. Beazley, built in 1876 to serve as both a church and a school. The church, located on Plumstone Road towards the south of the hamlet, was built out of flint rubble in a Gothic Revival style. The construction utilises an inside stock brick walling faced externally with stone quoins, pilasters and buttresses, while the panels set between the stone work are filled using flint. The south side of the building is cut into the ground, providing extended interior space despite the exterior's diminutive size. The building's apse, which replaces the usual chancel arch found in similar churches of its size, contains stained glass windows which depict Christ's Crucifixion, Our Lady and St John the Evangelist, and were designed by Gibbs & Howard, who work out of Charlotte Street in Fitzroy Square, London.

== The Smugglers Leap ==
Close by Acol is the chalk pit where Exciseman Gill and Smuggler Bill met their deaths as told in the well-known poem, The Smuggler's Leap by Richard Harris Barham. Exciseman Gill sold his soul for a demon horse that had the ability to catch Smuggler Bill. In the swirling mist on that night in Thanet, just as Exciseman Gill caught up with the Smuggler, he drove his horse off the top of the chalk pit, as did the riding officer. The bodies of the two men and only one horse were found later and are still said to haunt the area.

== See also ==
- Listed buildings in Acol
