= Herne Bay and Sandwich =

UK Parliament constituency (since 2024)

Coordinates: 51.34°N 1.27°E

- County constituency for the House of Commons
- Boundaries since 2024
- Boundary of Herne Bay and Sandwich in South East England
- County: Kent
- Electorate: 76,028 (2023)
- Major settlements: Birchington-on-Sea; Fordwich; Herne Bay; Sandwich; Sturry; Westgate-on-Sea

Current constituency
- Created: 2024
- Member of Parliament: Roger Gale (Conservative)
- Seats: One
- Created from: North Thanet; South Thanet (part); Canterbury (part)

Herne Bay and Sandwich is a constituency of the House of Commons in the UK Parliament. Further to the completion of the 2023 Periodic Review of Westminster constituencies, it was contested for the first time at the 2024 general election. It is represented by Roger Gale, of the Conservatives, who was MP for the predecessor seat of North Thanet from 1983 to 2024.

The constituency is named for the towns of Herne Bay and Sandwich in Kent.

== Constituency profile ==
The Herne Bay and Sandwich constituency is located in Kent and contains the mostly rural areas lying between Canterbury and the Isle of Thanet. Its largest settlement is the coastal town of Herne Bay, which has a population of around 40,000 when taken together with the connected village of Herne. The constituency also covers the seaside resorts of Westgate-on-Sea and Birchington-on-Sea to the east of Herne Bay. These coastal towns, like many similar towns in England, experienced economic decline during the late 20th century with the decrease in domestic tourism. Deprivation in these areas is above average. The inland, rural part of the constituency includes the small town of Sandwich and the villages of Minster-in-Thanet and Sturry. These areas have average levels of wealth. House prices across the constituency are similar to the national average but lower than the rest of South East England.

Compared to the rest of the country, residents of the constituency are older and have low levels of education. Household income is below average but rates of homeownership are high. A high proportion of residents work in the health and construction industries. White people made up 95% of the population at the 2021 census. At the district council level, almost all seats in the constituency are represented by Conservatives, with some Labour Party councillors elected in Westgate-on-Sea. At the county council, which held elections in 2025, all seats in the constituency were won by Reform UK. An estimated 62% of voters in the constituency supported leaving the European Union in the 2016 referendum, higher than the nationwide figure of 52%.

== Boundaries ==
The constituency is composed of the following (as they existed on 1 December 2020):

- The City of Canterbury wards of: Beltinge; Greenhill; Herne & Broomfield; Heron; Reculver; Sturry; West Bay.
- The District of Dover wards of: Little Stour & Ashstone; Sandwich.
- The District of Thanet wards of: Birchington North; Birchington South; Garlinge; Thanet Villages; Westbrook; Westgate-on-Sea.

It comprises the following areas of Kent:

- Approximately 80% of the former North Thanet seat, including Herne Bay, Birchington-on-Sea and Westgate-on-Sea
- Sandwich from South Thanet
- Sturry from Canterbury

== Members of Parliament ==
North Thanet prior to 2024

Election	Member	Party
2024	Roger Gale	Conservative

== Elections ==
=== Elections in the 2020s ===
General election 2024: Herne Bay and Sandwich
Party	Candidate	Votes	%	±%
Conservative	Roger Gale	17,243	35.3	−29.1
Labour	Helen Whitehead	14,744	30.2	+5.8
Reform	Amelia Randall	10,602	21.7	N/A
Green	Thea Barrett	3,529	7.2	+3.4
Liberal Democrats	Angie Curwen	2,709	5.5	−2.0
Majority		2,499	5.1	−34.9
Turnout		48,827	62.7	−4.3
Registered electors		77,841		
Conservative hold		Swing	−17.5	

=== Elections in the 2010s ===
2019 notional result
Party	Vote	%
Conservative	32,807	64.4
Labour	12,435	24.4
Liberal Democrats	3,799	7.5
Green	1,921	3.8
Turnout	50,962	67.0
Electorate	76,028	

== See also ==
- List of parliamentary constituencies in Kent
- List of parliamentary constituencies in the South East England (region)
