= Thanet District =

Coordinates: 51°22′N 1°23′E

- Non-metropolitan district
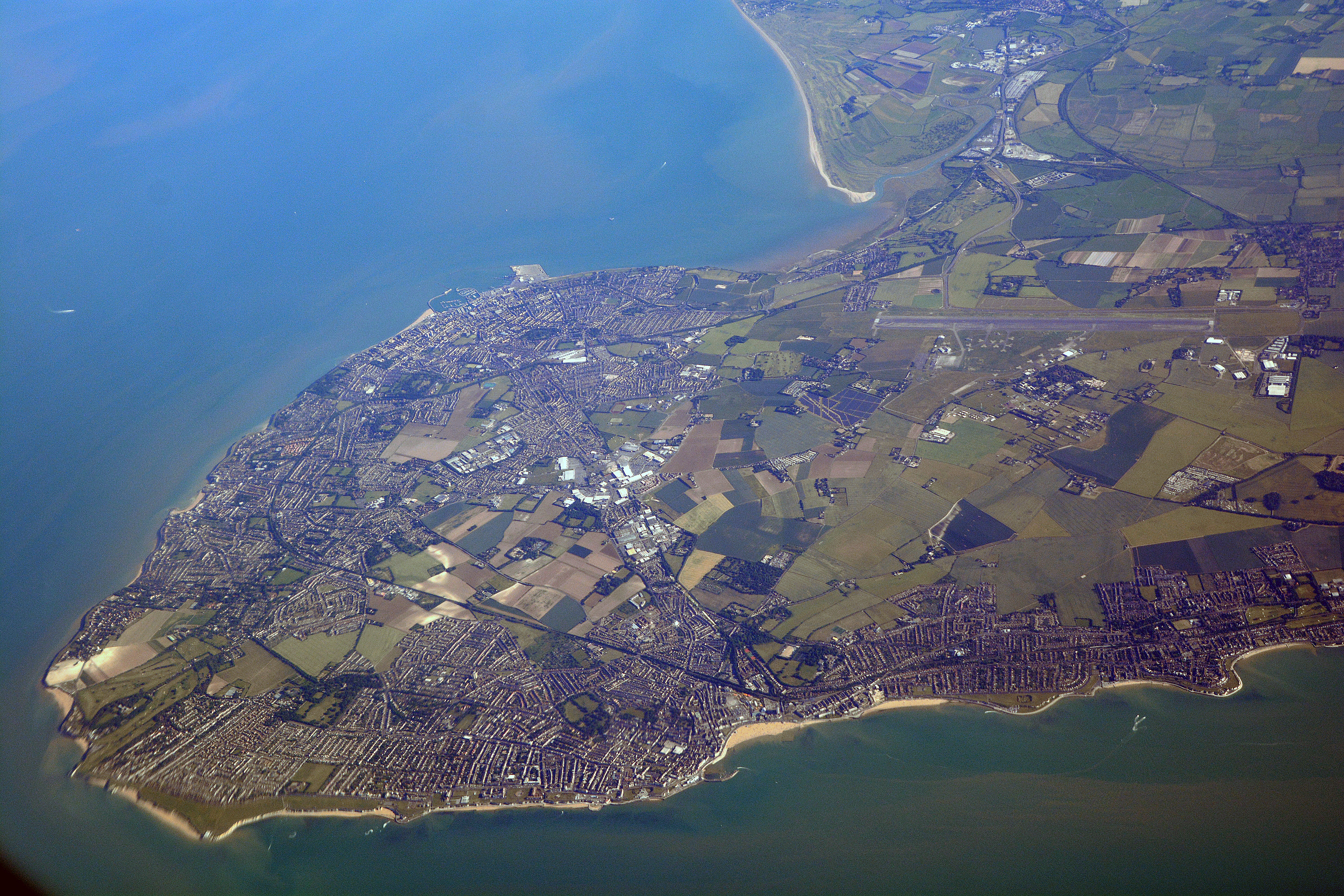
- Thanet aerial showing the towns of Broadstairs. Margate, Ramsgate and Westgate-on-Sea

- Thanet shown within Kent
- Sovereign state: United Kingdom
- Constituent country: England
- Region: South East England
- Non-metropolitan county: Kent
- Status: Non-metropolitan district
- Admin HQ: Margate
- Incorporated: 1 April 1974

Government
  - Type: Non-metropolitan district council
  - Body: Thanet District Council
  - MPs: Roger Gale (C); Polly Billington (L)

Area
  - Total: 39.88 sq mi (103.30 km^{2})
  - Rank: 194th (of 296)

Population (2024)
  - Total: 142,691
  - Rank: 164th (of 296)
  - Density: 3,577.6/sq mi (1,381.3/km^{2})

Ethnicity (2021)
  - Ethnic groups: List: 93% White; 2.4% Mixed; 2.3% Asian; 1.2% other; 1.1% Black

Religion (2021)
  - Religion: List: 46.7% Christianity; 44.1% no religion; 5.8% not stated; 1.5% Islam; 0.6% other; 0.6% Hinduism; 0.4% Buddhism; 0.2% Judaism; 0.1% Sikhism
- Time zone: UTC0 (GMT)
  - Summer (DST): UTC+1 (BST)
- ONS code: 29UN (ONS); E07000114 (GSS)
- OS grid reference: TR355705 +

Thanet /ˈθænɪt/ is a local government district in Kent, England. The council is based in Margate and the district also contains the towns of Broadstairs, Ramsgate and Westgate-on-Sea, along with several villages. It takes its name from the Isle of Thanet, a former island which gradually became connected to the mainland between the 12th and 16th centuries.

The district lies on the north-eastern tip of Kent, bordering the City of Canterbury to the west and Dover District to the south. It is predominantly coastal, with north, east and southeast-facing coastlines.

== History ==
The Isle of Thanet is the major part of the district. This was formerly an island separated from the mainland by the Wantsum Channel. The channel gradually closed between the 12th and 16th centuries through a combination of natural silting and artificial land reclamation. An Isle of Thanet Rural District covering the rural parts of the isle had existed from 1894 until it was abolished in 1935 to form part of Eastry Rural District.

The modern district was created on 1 April 1974 under the Local Government Act 1972 covering the whole area of three former districts and part of a fourth, which were all abolished at the same time:

- Margate Municipal Borough
- Ramsgate Municipal Borough
- Broadstairs and St Peter's Urban District
- Eastry Rural District (parishes of Acol, Minster, Monkton, St Nicholas-at-Wade and Sarre only, rest went to Dover District)

The new district was named Thanet, after the isle which covered approximately the same area.

Under current local government reorganisation plans, all district councils in Kent, as well as the county council, will be abolished in 2028, with the district becoming part of a new East Kent unitary authority.

== Governance ==
Thanet District Council

Type
- Type: Non-metropolitan district

History
- Founded: 1 April 1974

Leadership
- Chair: Debra Owen-Hughes, Labour since 9 May 2024
- Leader: Rick Everitt, Labour since 18 May 2023
- Chief Executive: Colin Carmichael since 20 July 2022

Structure
- Seats: 56 councillors
- Political groups: Administration (30) Labour (30) Other parties (26) Conservative (13) Green (6) Reform UK (5) Independent (2)

Elections
- Last election: 4 May 2023

Meeting place
- Council Offices, Cecil Street, Margate, CT9 1XZ

Website
- www.thanet.gov.uk

Thanet District Council provides district-level services. County-level services are provided by Kent County Council. Much of the district is also covered by civil parishes, which form a third tier of local government.

=== Political control ===
The council has been under Labour majority control since the 2023 Thanet District Council election.

The first election to the council was held in 1973, initially operating as a shadow authority alongside the outgoing authorities before coming into its powers on 1 April 1974. Political control of the council since 1974 has been as follows:

| Party in control | Years |
|---|---|
| Conservative | 1974–1987 |
| No overall control | 1987–1991 |
| Conservative | 1991–1995 |
| Labour | 1995–2003 |
| Conservative | 2003–2011 |
| No overall control | 2011–2015 |
| UK Independence Party | 2015–2015 |
| No overall control | 2015–2016 |
| UK Independence Party | 2016–2017 |
| No overall control | 2017–2023 |
| Labour | 2023–present |

=== Leadership ===
The leaders of the council since 1999 have been:

| Councillor | Party | From | To |
|---|---|---|---|
| Richard Nicholson | Labour | pre-1999 | 22 May 2003 |
| Sandy Ezekiel | Conservative | 22 May 2003 | 13 May 2010 |
| Bob Bayford | Conservative | 13 May 2010 | 8 Dec 2011 |
| Clive Hart | Labour | 8 Dec 2011 | 12 May 2014 |
| Iris Johnston | Labour | 15 May 2014 | May 2015 |
| Chris Wells | UKIP | 21 May 2015 | 28 Feb 2018 |
| Bob Bayford | Conservative | 1 Mar 2018 | 10 Oct 2019 |
| Rick Everitt | Labour | 10 Oct 2019 | 22 Apr 2021 |
| Ash Ashbee | Conservative | 3 Jun 2021 | May 2023 |
| Rick Everitt | Labour | 18 May 2023 | |

=== Composition ===
Following the 2023 election, and subsequent changes of allegiance up to June 2026, the composition of the council was:

| Party | Councillors |
|---|---|
| Labour | 30 |
| Conservative | 13 |
| Green | 6 |
| Reform | 5 |
| Independent | 2 |
| Total | 56 |

One of the independent councillors and the Greens sit together as the "Green and Independent Group".

=== Elections ===
Since the last boundary changes in 2003 the council has comprised 56 councillors representing 23 wards, with each ward electing one, two or three councillors. Elections are held every four years.

The district straddles two constituencies, one of which extends beyond the district boundary to include parts of neighbouring districts:

- East Thanet, represented by Polly Billington, Labour.
- Herne Bay and Sandwich, represented by Roger Gale, Conservative.

=== Premises ===
The council is based at the Council Offices on Cecil Street in the centre of Margate. The building was originally designed in the early 1970s to be a new headquarters for Margate Borough Council, but by the time the building was finished in 1974 that council had been abolished and absorbed into the larger Thanet District Council. The building was formally opened on 9 April 1975.

== Towns and parishes ==
The district contains 11 civil parishes, covering most of the area. The parish councils for Broadstairs and St Peter's, Ramsgate, and Westgate-on-Sea have declared their parishes to be towns, allowing them to take the title "town council". The two parishes of Sarre and St Nicholas-at-Wade share a grouped parish council.

- Acol
- Birchington
- Broadstairs and St Peter's
- Cliffsend
- Manston
- Minster
- Monkton
- Ramsgate
- Sarre
- St Nicholas-at-Wade
- Westgate-on-Sea

The town of Margate comprises an unparished area. The Thanet councillors representing the wards covering Margate act as charter trustees, choosing one of their number to be the mayor of Margate each year.

== Demography ==
According to the 2011 census, the population of Thanet was 134,186, an increase of about 6000 in the ten years since the previous census.

== Economy ==
The whole district suffers from seasonal unemployment, in spite of its proximity to London, because of various factors, among them being inward migration, high numbers of old people, and low numbers of affluent people. It is not helped by poor overall indicators for health. In a study of resilience to economic downturns, Thanet was poorly rated at 295th out of 324 districts. Unemployment levels are nearly twice the South East of England as a whole, and as a result a great deal of planning is being done to encourage more businesses to relocate to the District. The Thanet & East Kent Chamber produces a weekly business digest, the Thanet & East Kent Insider, which reports on economic activity in the private and public sectors.

Redevelopment projects had included in Margate from 2003 onwards amusement park development at Dreamland and the Turner Contemporary which was opened by Tracey Emin in April 2011. These projects created 300 new jobs, 19% tourism grown between 2013-15 and in case of the Turner Contemporary gallery one million new visitors to Margate. However the designation in 2011 of Margate as a Mary Portas retail town has by 2017 been described as a failure. After a saga with initial ground work starting in 2004 the seafront Ramsgate Royal Sands development resumed in June 2020 and by 2023 its luxury apartments were being sold, even if beyond the means of most locals. In 2026 plans exist to restore the Margate Winter Gardens theatre which had been built in 1910, rebuilt after damage in World War II and closed in 2022. A project has long existed to reopen Manston Airport near Ramsgate which closed in 2014 but the earliest this would happen would be 2029.

In addition, the District Council has introduced an empty property initiative and has compulsorily purchased empty and derelict buildings with the objective of bringing them back into use.

The Thanet Offshore Wind Project, near North Foreland, began operating in September 2010. The project is expected to have a total capacity of up to 300 MW which, on average, is sufficient to supply approximately 240,000 homes with green energy. The project will thus make a significant contribution to the government's national and regional renewable energy targets. Thanet Earth is the largest greenhouse development in the UK, covering an area of 91 hectares with 7 greenhouses each the size of 10 football pitches producing cucumbers, tomatoes and peppers all year.

Westwood at the centre of Thanet has seen the building of Westwood Cross shopping centre. Associated development has taken place around the shopping centre spawning other retail parks. Margate, Ramsgate and Broadstairs each have traditional town centre shopping centres. Northdown Road, Cliftonville, Westgate and Birchington-on-Sea have smaller shopping areas.

== Transport ==
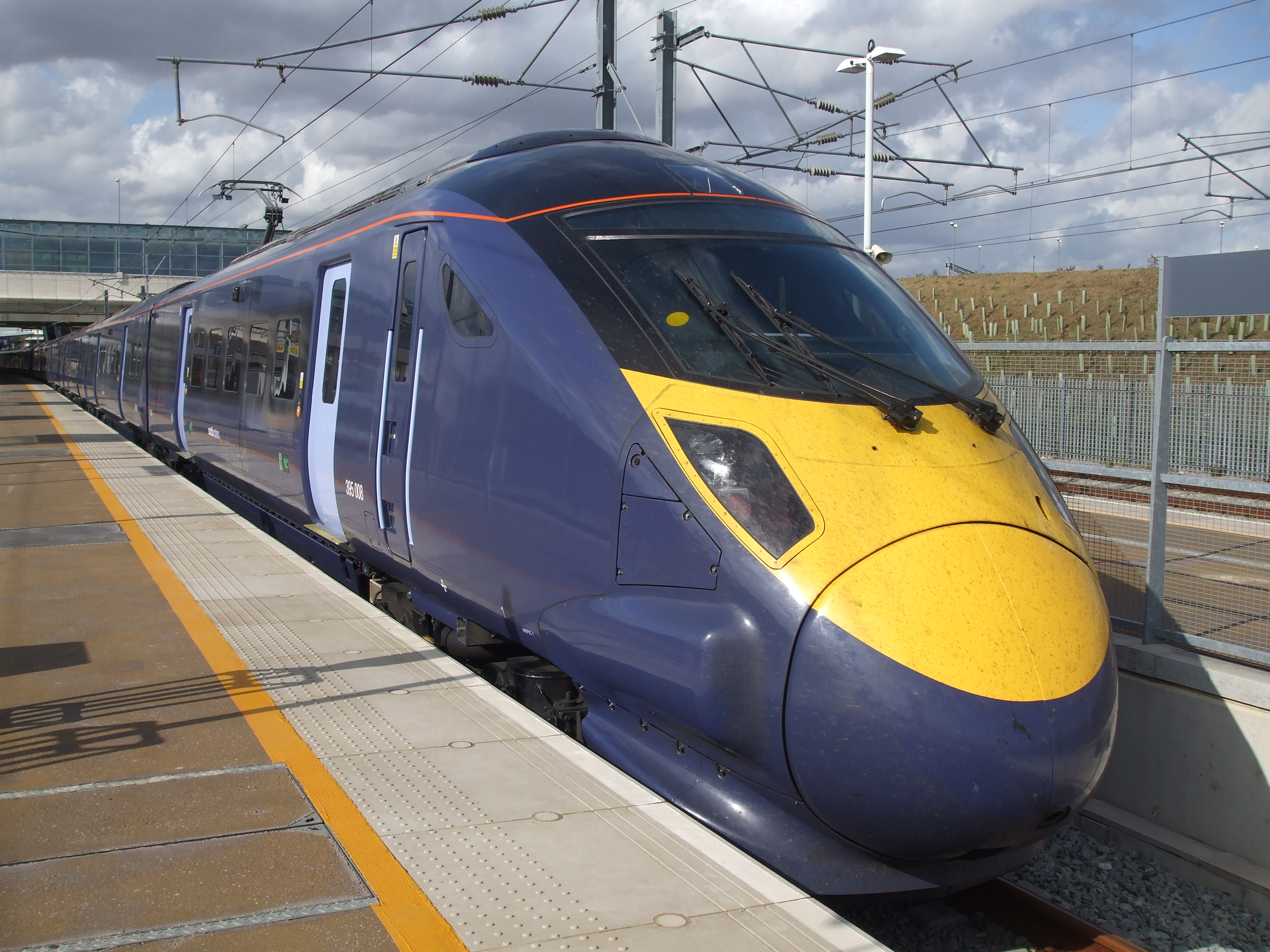
Thanet is now linked to London by high-speed "Javelin" trains.

The rail connections are via the Chatham Main Line through Margate to Ramsgate, and the Ashford to Ramsgate (via Canterbury West) line. New high-speed rail links from London to Thanet began in December 2009, and it is now possible to travel from Margate to St Pancras railway station at up to 140 mph (230 km/h). Main road links are the A28 which brings traffic from Canterbury and Ashford; and the A299, north coast route. The Saxon Shore Way Long distance footpath skirts the coast.

There is an airport, now closed, at Manston, formerly RAF Manston, but later renamed by its commercial operators as Kent International Airport. The airport closed permanently on 15 May, 2014. Because it was used as a U.S. airbase during the Second World War it has one of the longest runways in the UK, and while open it was designated by the United Nations as an emergency landing site for aircraft.

Ferry services are no longer running from the Port of Ramsgate, and the council was in dispute with the former operators over the payment of £3.3 million

== Health ==
Thanet's major hospital is the Queen Elizabeth The Queen Mother Hospital, known as the QEQM.

A new community hub was opened near Westwood Cross in 2025.

As of February 2026, overall indicators of health were poor for Thanet:

=== Significantly better than national average ===
- Sickness absence from work
- Households owed a duty under the Homelessness Reduction Act
- Emergency Hospital Admissions for Intentional Self-Harm
- Admission episodes for alcohol-related conditions
- Cervical cancer screening coverage (aged 25 to 49 years old)
- People with a high anxiety score
- Emergency hospital admissions due to falls in people aged 65 and over
- Emergency readmissions within 30 days of discharge from hospital
- New STI diagnoses (excluding chlamydia aged 24 years and under) per 100,000
- Tuberculosis incidence (three year average)
- Adjusted antibiotic prescribing in primary care by the NHS

=== Significantly worse than national average ===
- Life expectancy at birth
- Life expectancy at age 65
- Children in low income families
- Hospital admissions caused by unintentional and deliberate injuries in children (aged 0 to 4 years)
- Age 10–11 prevalence of overweight
- Under 18s conception rate
- Hospital admissions for violence (including sexual violence)
- Percentage of physically active adults
- Percentage reporting a long-term musculoskeletal problem
- Breast cancer screening coverage
- Cervical cancer screening coverage (aged 50 to 64 years old)
- Chlamydia detection rate per 100,000 aged 15 to 24 years
- HIV late diagnosis
- Under 75 mortality rate from causes considered preventable
- Under 75 mortality rate from cardiovascular disease
- Under 75 mortality rate from cancer
- Under 75 mortality rate from cancer considered preventable
- Under 75 mortality rate from preventable liver disease
- Under 75 mortality rate from respiratory disease considered preventable
- Dementia diagnosis rate (aged 65 and older)

== Media ==
Local newspapers are the Thanet Extra, part of the KM Group; Isle of Thanet Gazette owned by Northcliffe Media; and the midweek Your Thanet published online by KOS Media.

Local radio stations are;

- KMFM Thanet (previously known as Thanet Local Radio) owned by the KM Group.
- Community non-commercial station Academy FM Thanet on 107.8FM and online and via mobile app it broadcasts from within Marlowe Academy, Ramsgate.
- The county-wide Heart South
- BBC Radio Kent

National TV stations carry regional news: The ITV1 service is provided currently by Meridian Broadcasting; and the BBC South East Today.

== Education ==
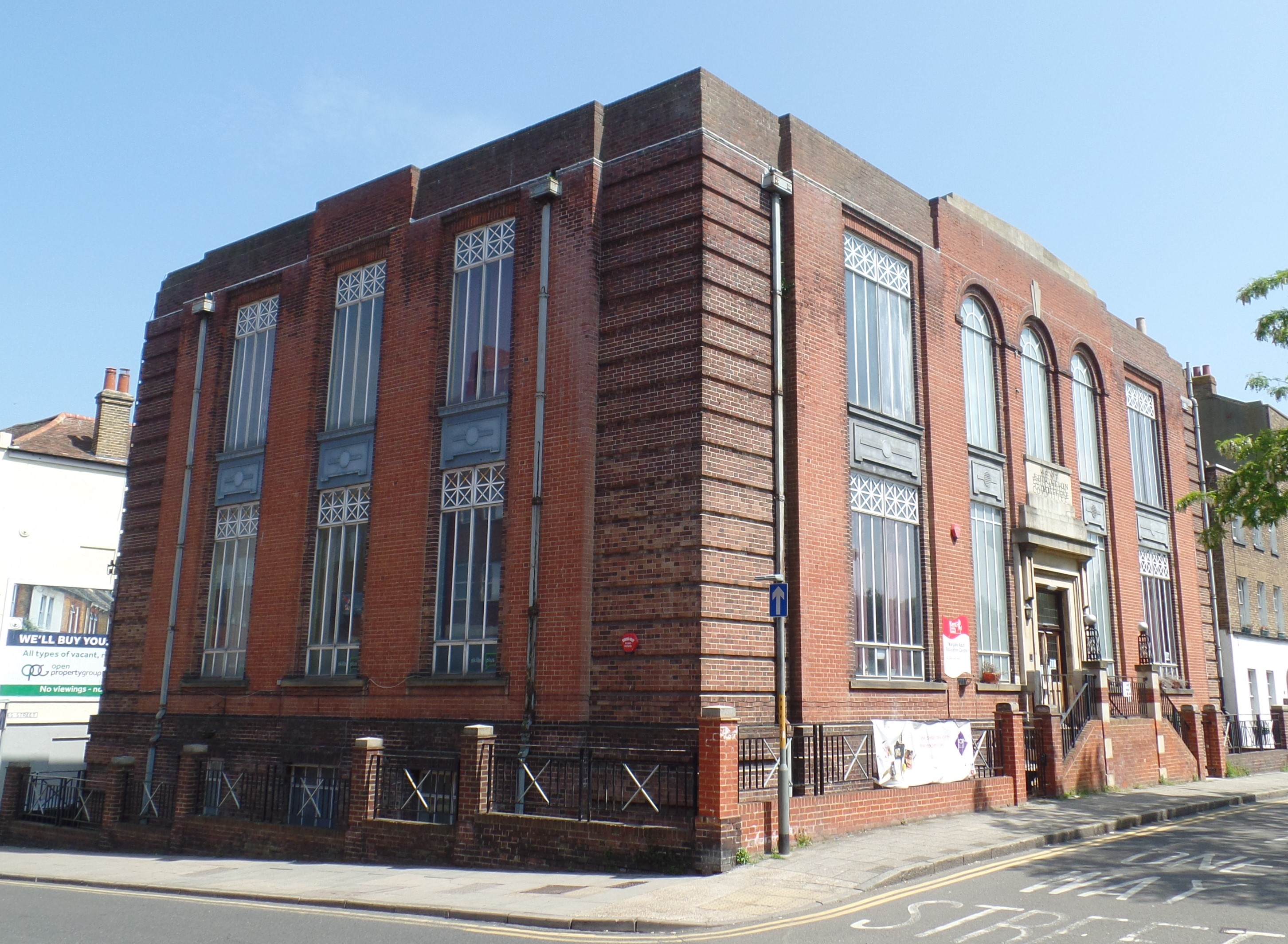
Margate Adult Education Centre, built in 1928 as Thanet School of Art.

Thanet has a wide variety of local schools. The community learning within the district is varied and wide, including charitable training organisations such as East Kent ITeC Ltd, and organisations such as Margate Adult Education Centre, Thanet Skills Studio and Thanet Stage School. East Kent College is a provider of further education in Thanet and a Training Provider that works with local businesses to raise the level of education across the region. In 2023, Nelson College London took over the former Canterbury Christ Church University campus in Broadstairs, offering HND courses in Business and Hospitality Management.

== Climate ==
Thanet enjoys a maritime climate, being surrounded on three sides by the sea. This generally results in mild winters and warm, dry summers.
