= List of acts of the 3rd Parliament of the United Kingdom =

This is a complete list of acts of only session of the 3rd Parliament of the United Kingdom which had regnal year 47 Geo. 3. Sess. 1. This session met from 15 December 1806 until 27 April 1807.

== 1807 ==
The 3rd Parliament of the United Kingdom, which met from 15 December 1806 until 27 April 1807.

This session was also traditionally cited as 47 Geo. 3. sess. 1, 47 G. 3. Sess. 1 or 47 G. 3. sess. 1.

=== Public general acts ===
Short title	Citation	Royal assent
Long title
Controverted Elections Act 1807	47 Geo. 3 Sess. 1. c. 1	6 January 1807
An Act to revive and make perpetual and to amend an Act made in the Forty-second Year of His present Majesty, (Note: Controverted Elections Act 1802 (42 Geo. 3. c. 84)) for the further Regulation of the Trials of controverted Elections or Returns of Members to serve in Parliament, and for expediting the Proceedings relating thereto.
Loans or Exchequer Bills Act 1807 (repealed)	47 Geo. 3 Sess. 1. c. 2	16 January 1807
An Act for raising the Sum of Ten millions five hundred thousand Pounds, by Loans or Exchequer Bills, for the Service of Great Britain for the Year One thousand eight hundred and seven. (Repealed by Statute Law Revision Act 1872 (No. 2) (35 & 36 Vict. c. 97))
Duties on Malt Act 1807 (repealed)	47 Geo. 3 Sess. 1. c. 3	22 January 1807
An Act for continuing and granting to His Majesty certain Duties upon Malt in Great Britain for the Service of the Year One thousand eight hundred and seven. (Repealed by Statute Law Revision Act 1872 (No. 2) (35 & 36 Vict. c. 97))
Duties on Pensions, etc. Act 1807 (repealed)	47 Geo. 3 Sess. 1. c. 4	22 January 1807
An Act for continuing and granting to His Majesty a Duty on Pensions, Offices, and Personal Estates, in England; and certain Duties on Sugar, Malt, Tobacco, and Snuff, in Great Britain, for the Service of the Year One thousand eight hundred and seven. (Repealed by Statute Law Revision Act 1872 (No. 2) (35 & 36 Vict. c. 97))
Indemnity Act 1807 (repealed)	47 Geo. 3 Sess. 1. c. 5	19 February 1807
An Act to indemnify such Persons in the United Kingdom as have omitted to qualify themselves for Offices and Employments; and for extending the Times limited for those Purposes respectively, until the Twenty-fifth Day of December One thousand eight hundred and seven, and to permit such Persons in Great Britain as have omitted to make and file Affidavits of the Execution of Indentures of Clerks to Attornies and Solicitors, to make and file the same on or before the First Day of Michaelmas Term One thousand eight hundred and seven. (Repealed by Promissory Oaths Act 1871 (34 & 35 Vict. c. 48))
Irish Militia Act 1807 (repealed)	47 Geo. 3 Sess. 1. c. 6	19 February 1807
An Act to continue, during the present War, and until One Year after the Termination thereof by the Ratification of a Definitive Treaty of Peace, an Act made in the Forty-fourth Year of His present Majesty, for empowering His Majesty to accept the Services of such Parts of His Militia Forces in Ireland, as might voluntarily offer themselves to be employed in Great Britain. (Repealed by Statute Law Revision Act 1872 (No. 2) (35 & 36 Vict. c. 97))
Interchange of Grain Between Great Britain and Ireland Act 1807 (repealed)	47 Geo. 3 Sess. 1. c. 7	19 February 1807
An Act to declare that certain Provisions of an Act of the last Session of the last Parliament, intituled, "An Act to permit the free Interchange of every Species of Grain between Great Britain and Ireland," (Note: Grain Between Great Britain and Ireland Act 1806 (46 Geo. 3. c. 97)) shall extend to Grain the Produce of those Countries only. (Repealed by Statute Law Revision Act 1861 (24 & 25 Vict. c. 101))
Arms and Gunpowder (Ireland) Act 1807 (repealed)	47 Geo. 3 Sess. 1. c. 8	19 February 1807
An Act to continue for the Term of Seven Years certain Acts of the Parliament of Ireland, for preventing the Importation of Arms, Gunpowder, and Ammunition, and the making, removing, selling, and keeping of Gunpowder, Arms, and Ammunition, without Licence. (Repealed by Statute Law Revision Act 1872 (No. 2) (35 & 36 Vict. c. 97))
Exportation Act 1807 (repealed)	47 Geo. 3 Sess. 1. c. 9	19 February 1807
An Act for allowing the Exportation annually of a limited Quantity of Worsted Yarn to Canada. (Repealed by Customs Law Repeal Act 1825 (6 Geo. 4. c. 105))
Treasury Bills (Ireland) Act 1807 (repealed)	47 Geo. 3 Sess. 1. c. 10	19 February 1807
An Act for raising the Sum of One Million by Treasury Bills for the service of Ireland for the Year One thousand eight hundred and seven. (Repealed by Statute Law Revision Act 1872 (No. 2) (35 & 36 Vict. c. 97))
Cape of Good Hope Trade Act 1807 (repealed)	47 Geo. 3 Sess. 1. c. 11	19 February 1807
An Act to authorize His Majesty until the Twenty-fifth Day of March One thousand eight hundred and eight, to make Regulations respecting the Trade and Commerce to and from the Cape of Good Hope. (Repealed by Statute Law Revision Act 1872 (No. 2) (35 & 36 Vict. c. 97))
Customs (Ireland) Act 1807 (repealed)	47 Geo. 3 Sess. 1. c. 12	19 February 1807
An Act to abolish certain Offices in the Customs in Ireland; and to abolish or regulate certain other Offices therein. (Repealed by Statute Law Revision Act 1861 (24 & 25 Vict. c. 101))
Accounts, etc., of Barrack Master General Act 1807	47 Geo. 3 Sess. 1. c. 13	19 February 1807
An Act for investing certain Commissioners appointed for the Examination of Accounts and Expenditure relating to the Office of Barrack Master General, with certain Powers and Authorities necessary for the Examination of such Accounts and Expenditure. (Repealed by Statute Law Revision Act 1872 (No. 2) (35 & 36 Vict. c. 97))
Controverted Elections (Ireland) Act 1807 (repealed)	47 Geo. 3 Sess. 1. c. 14	19 February 1807
An Act to amend several Acts, for regulating the Trial of Controverted Elections or Returns of Members to serve in Parliament, so far as the same relate to Ireland. (Repealed by Statute Law Revision Act 1872 (No. 2) (35 & 36 Vict. c. 97))
Army and Navy Act 1807 (repealed)	47 Geo. 3 Sess. 1. c. 15	19 February 1807
An Act to continue for the Term of Seven Years, certain Acts for the better Prevention and Punishment of Attempts to seduce Persons serving in His Majesty's Forces by Sea or Land from their Duty and Allegiance to His Majesty, or to incite them to Mutiny or Disobedience. (Repealed by Statute Law Revision Act 1872 (No. 2) (35 & 36 Vict. c. 97))
Sale of Crown Rents, etc. (Ireland) Act 1807	47 Geo. 3 Sess. 1. c. 16	17 March 1807
An Act to amend several Acts for the Sale of His Majesty's Quit Rents, Crown and other Rents, and of certain Lands forfeited and undisposed of in Ireland.
Auction Duties (Ireland) Act 1807	47 Geo. 3 Sess. 1. c. 17	17 March 1807
An Act to secure the Collection of the Duties on Auctions in Ireland; and to prevent Frauds therein.
Excise Duties and Taxes (Ireland) Act 1807 (repealed)	47 Geo. 3 Sess. 1. c. 18	17 March 1807
An Act to grant to His Majesty certain Inland Duties of Excise and Taxes in Ireland, and to allow certain Drawbacks in respect thereof; in lieu of former Duties of Excise, Taxes, and Drawbacks. (Repealed by Statute Law Revision Act 1872 (No. 2) (35 & 36 Vict. c. 97))
Drawbacks (Ireland) Act 1807 (repealed)	47 Geo. 3 Sess. 1. c. 19	17 March 1807
An Act to provide more effectually for regulating the Drawbacks and Bounties on the Exportation of Sugar from Ireland; and for allowing British Plantation Sugar to be Warehoused in Ireland; until the Twenty-fifth Day of March One thousand eight hundred and eight. (Repealed by Statute Law Revision Act 1861 (24 & 25 Vict. c. 101))
Drawbacks Act 1807 (repealed)	47 Geo. 3 Sess. 1. c. 20	17 March 1807
An Act to suspend until the First Day of May One thousand eight hundred and seven, the Payment of all Drawbacks on Spirits made or distilled in Great Britain or Ireland, and exported from either Country to the other respectively. (Repealed by Statute Law Revision Act 1872 (No. 2) (35 & 36 Vict. c. 97))
Assessed Taxes (Ireland) Act 1807	47 Geo. 3 Sess. 1. c. 21	17 March 1807
An Act to provide for regulating and securing the Collection of certain Rates and Taxes in Ireland, in respect of Dwelling Houses, Fire Hearths, Windows, Male Servants, Horses, Dogs, and Carriages.
Bounties on Sugar Act 1807 (repealed)	47 Geo. 3 Sess. 1. c. 22	17 March 1807
An Act to allow for Two Years, from and after the passing of this Act, an additional Bounty on Double Refined Sugar, and to extend former Bounties on other Refined Sugar to such as shall be pounded, crashed, or broken; and to allow for One Year certain Bounties on British Plantation Raw Sugar exported. (Repealed by Customs Law Repeal Act 1825 (6 Geo. 4. c. 105))
South Sea Company Act 1807 (repealed)	47 Geo. 3 Sess. 1. c. 23	17 March 1807
An Act for repealing so much of an Act, made in the Ninth Year of Her late Majesty Queen Anne, (Note: Stamps Act 1710 (9 Ann. c. 21)) as vests in The South Sea Company or Corporation, by the said Act erected, the sole and exclusive Privilege of carrying on Trade and Traffic to and from any Part whatsoever of South America, or in the South Seas, which now are, or may at any Time hereafter be in the Possession of His Majesty, His Heirs or Successors. (Repealed by Statute Law Revision Act 1872 (No. 2) (35 & 36 Vict. c. 97))
Importation Act 1807 (repealed)	47 Geo. 3 Sess. 1. c. 24	17 March 1807
An Act for allowing until the First Day of August One thousand eight hundred and eight, the Importation of certain Fish from Newfoundland and the Coast of Labrador, and for granting a Bounty thereon. (Repealed by Statute Law Revision Act 1872 (No. 2) (35 & 36 Vict. c. 97))
Importation (No. 2) Act 1807 (repealed)	47 Geo. 3 Sess. 1. c. 25	17 March 1807
An Act to allow Turkey Tobacco to be imported into Great Britain, in small Packages. (Repealed by Customs Law Repeal Act 1825 (6 Geo. 4. c. 105))
Importation (No. 3) Act 1807 (repealed)	47 Geo. 3 Sess. 1. c. 26	17 March 1807
An Act for extending to German Yarn the Provisions of an Act made in the last Session of the last Parliament (Note: Importation Act 1806 (46 Geo. 3. c. 74)) for permitting Prussian Yarn to be imported in Foreign Ships on Payment of the like Duties as if imported in British Ships. (Repealed by Customs Law Repeal Act 1825 (6 Geo. 4. c. 105))
Excise Act 1807 (repealed)	47 Geo. 3 Sess. 1. c. 27	17 March 1807
An Act for granting to His Majesty, until Twelve Months after the Ratification of a Definitive Treaty of Peace, certain additional Duties of Excise on Brandy in Great Britain. (Repealed by Statute Law Revision Act 1872 (No. 2) (35 & 36 Vict. c. 97))
National Debt Act 1807 (repealed)	47 Geo. 3 Sess. 1. c. 28	17 March 1807
An Act for raising the Sum of Fourteen Millions Two hundred thousand Pounds by way of Annuities. (Repealed by Statute Law Revision Act 1870 (33 & 34 Vict. c. 69))
Bounties (Great Britain) Act 1807 (repealed)	47 Geo. 3 Sess. 1. c. 29	23 March 1807
An Act for further continuing, until the Twenty-fifth Day of March One thousand eight hundred and eight, certain Bounties and Drawbacks on the Exportation of Sugar from Great Britain; and for suspending the Countervailing Duties and Bounties on Sugar when the Duties imposed by an Act of the last Session of Parliament (Note: Duties on Certain Goods Act 1806 (46 Geo. 3. c. 42)) shall be suspended. (Repealed by Statute Law Revision Act 1872 (No. 2) (35 & 36 Vict. c. 97))
Exportation Act (No. 2) 1807 (repealed)	47 Geo. 3 Sess. 1. c. 30	23 March 1807
An Act to continue until the Twenty-fifth Day of March One thousand eight hundred and ten, an Act of the Forty-fourth Year of His present Majesty, (Note: Exportation (No. 3) Act 1804 (44 Geo. 3. c. 101)) for permitting the Exportation of Salt from the Port of Nassau in the Island of New Providence, the Port of Exuma, and the Port of Crooked Island in the Bahama Islands, in Ships belonging to the Inhabitants of the United States of America, and coming in Ballast. (Repealed by Statute Law Revision Act 1872 (No. 2) (35 & 36 Vict. c. 97))
Importation (Ireland) Act 1807 (repealed)	47 Geo. 3 Sess. 1. c. 31	23 March 1807
An Act to repeal Part of the Duty on the Importation of unmanufactured Tobacco into Ireland. (Repealed by Statute Law Revision Act 1872 (No. 2) (35 & 36 Vict. c. 97))
Mutiny Act 1807 (repealed)	47 Geo. 3 Sess. 1. c. 32	23 March 1807
An Act for punishing Mutiny and Desertion; and for the better Payment of the Army and their Quarters. (Repealed by Statute Law Revision Act 1872 (No. 2) (35 & 36 Vict. c. 97))
Marine Mutiny Act 1807 (repealed)	47 Geo. 3 Sess. 1. c. 33	23 March 1807
An Act for the Regulation of His Majesty's Royal Marine Forces while on Shore. (Repealed by Statute Law Revision Act 1872 (No. 2) (35 & 36 Vict. c. 97))
Bringing of Coals, etc., to London Act 1807 (repealed)	47 Geo. 3 Sess. 1. c. 34	23 March 1807
An Act for continuing until the First Day of August One thousand eight hundred and eight, an Act of the Forty-fifth Year of His present Majesty, (Note: Bringing Coals to London, etc. Act 1806 (46 Geo. 3. c. 104)) for allowing, under certain Restrictions, the bringing a limited Quantity of Coals, Culm, or Cinders, to London and Westminster, by Inland Navigation. (Repealed by Statute Law Revision Act 1872 (No. 2) (35 & 36 Vict. c. 97))
Excise (Ireland) Act 1807	47 Geo. 3 Sess. 1. c. 35	25 March 1807
An Act to secure the Payment of the Duties on Licences granted to Persons in Ireland dealing in Exciseable Commodities.
Abolition of Slave Trade Act 1807 (repealed)	47 Geo. 3 Sess. 1. c. 36	25 March 1807
An Act for the Abolition of the Slave Trade. (Repealed by Statute Law Revision Act 1861 (24 & 25 Vict. c. 101))
Depredations on the Thames Act 1807 (repealed)	47 Geo. 3 Sess. 1. c. 37	25 March 1807
An Act to continue, until the Twenty-fifth Day of March One thousand eight hundred and fourteen, and amend an Act, made in the Thirty-ninth and Fortieth Year of His present Majesty, (Note: Depredations on the Thames Act 1800 (39 & 40 Geo. 3. c. 87)) for the more effectual Prevention of Depredations on the River Thames and its Vicinity; and to amend an Act made in the Second Year of His present Majesty, to prevent the committing of Thefts and Frauds by Persons navigating Bum Boats, and other Boats, upon the River Thames. (Repealed by Statute Law Revision Act 1872 (No. 2) (35 & 36 Vict. c. 97))
Paper Duties (Ireland) Act 1807 (repealed)	47 Geo. 3 Sess. 1. c. 38	9 April 1807
An Act to amend several Acts for regulating and securing the Collection of the Duties on Paper, made in Ireland; and to make perpetual so much of an Act made in the Forty-Fifth Year of His present Majesty, (Note: Duties on Paper Act 1805 (45 Geo. 3. c. 106)) as relates to Paper Hangings printed or stained in Ireland. (Repealed by Statute Law Revision Act 1861 (24 & 25 Vict. c. 101))
Annuities to Branches of Royal Family Act 1807 (repealed)	47 Geo. 3 Sess. 1. c. 39	9 April 1807
An Act to rectify a Mistake in an Act made in the last Session of Parliament, (Note: Annuities to Royal Family Act 1806 (46 Geo. 3. c. 145)) for enabling His Majesty to settle Annuities on certain Branches of the Royal Family. (Repealed by Statute Law Revision Act 1872 (No. 2) (35 & 36 Vict. c. 97))
Duties, etc., on Malt, etc. (Ireland) Act 1807 (repealed)	47 Geo. 3 Sess. 1. c. 40	25 April 1807
An Act to grant to His Majesty, until the Twenty-ninth Day of September One thousand eight hundred and eight, a Duty upon Malt made in Ireland, and upon Spirits made or distilled in Ireland, and to allow certain Drawbacks on the Exportation thereof. (Repealed by Statute Law Revision Act 1861 (24 & 25 Vict. c. 101))
Fees, etc., in Public Offices (Ireland) Act 1807 (repealed)	47 Geo. 3 Sess. 1. c. 41	25 April 1807
An Act to continue until the Twenty-fifth Day of March One thousand eight hundred and eight, and from thence until the End of the then next Session of Parliament, an Act made in the Forty-fourth Year of His present Majesty's Reign, (Note: Inquiry into Public Offices (Ireland) Act 1804 (44 Geo. 3. c. 106)) for appointing Commissioners to enquire into the Fees, Gratuities, Perquisites, and Emoluments received in several Publick Offices in Ireland; to examine into any Abuses which may exist in the same, and into the Mode of receiving, collecting, issuing, and accounting for Publick Money in Ireland. (Repealed by Statute Law Revision Act 1872 (No. 2) (35 & 36 Vict. c. 97))
Lighting, etc., of Cities (Ireland) Act 1807 (repealed)	47 Geo. 3 Sess. 1. c. 42	25 April 1807
An Act to continue for Twenty-one Years, so much of certain Acts of the Parliament of Ireland, as relate to the lighting, cleansing, and watching of Cities and Towns for the lighting, cleansing, and watching of which no particular Provision is made by any Act of Parliament. (Repealed by Statute Law Revision Act 1872 (No. 2) (35 & 36 Vict. c. 97))
Servants' Wages (Ireland) Act 1807	47 Geo. 3 Sess. 1. c. 43	25 April 1807
An Act to declare that the Provisions of an Act made in the Parliament of Ireland in the Thirty-third Year of King Henry the Eighth, (Note: Servants' Wages Act 1542 (33 Hen. 8. c. 3 (I))) relating to Servants Wages, shall extend to all Counties of Cities and Counties of Towns in Ireland.
Hospitals (Ireland) Act 1807 (repealed)	47 Geo. 3 Sess. 1. c. 44	25 April 1807
An Act to amend an Act made in the last Session of Parliament, (Note: Hospitals and Infirmaries (Ireland) Act 1806 (46 Geo. 3. c. 95)) for regulating and providing for the Relief of the Poor and the Management of Infirmaries and Hospitals in Ireland. (Repealed by Statute Law Revision Act 1872 (No. 2) (35 & 36 Vict. c. 97))
Collieries (Ireland) Act 1807 (repealed)	47 Geo. 3 Sess. 1. c. 45	25 April 1807
An Act to continue an Act made in the Parliament of Ireland, in the Thirty-first Year of the Reign of His late Majesty King George the Second, (Note: Collieries Act 1757 (31 Geo. 2. c. 14 (I)))) for the better supplying the City of Dublin with Coals, and for the better Encouragement of the Collieries of Ireland. (Repealed by Statute Law Revision Act 1872 (No. 2) (35 & 36 Vict. c. 97))
National Debt (No. 2) Act 1807 (repealed)	47 Geo. 3 Sess. 1. c. 46	25 April 1807
An Act for raising the Sum of One Million five hundred thousand Pounds by way of Annuities, for the Service of Ireland. (Repealed by Statute Law Revision Act 1870 (33 & 34 Vict. c. 69))
Prize Act 1807 (repealed)	47 Geo. 3 Sess. 1. c. 47	25 April 1807
An Act to authorize the Payment of Prize Money arising from Captures made by Ships of his Sicilian Majesty in Conjunction with British Ships, to the Sicilian Envoy, for the Use of the Officers and Men of such Ships; and also the Payment of Money arising out of Proceeds of Prizes or Captures made by any other Ships or Vessels belonging to Foreign States, in Conjunction with His Majesty's Ships. (Repealed by Statute Law Revision Act 1861 (24 & 25 Vict. c. 101))
Bonding of Coffee, etc. Act 1807 (repealed)	47 Geo. 3 Sess. 1. c. 48	25 April 1807
An Act to repeal so much of certain Acts as relates to the Regulations or Conditions under which Coffee, Cocoa Nuts, Sugar and Rice, (not being the Produce of the East Indies), are allowed to be secured in Warehouses, without Payment of Duty; and to authorize the Collectors and Comptrollers of the Customs in His Majesty's Colonies and Plantations in America, and the West Indies, to administer certain Oaths. (Repealed by Customs Law Repeal Act 1825 (6 Geo. 4. c. 105))
Exportation Act (No. 3) 1807 (repealed)	47 Geo. 3 Sess. 1. c. 49	25 April 1807
An Act for permitting the Exportation of Fullers Earth, Fulling Clay, and Tobacco Pipe Clay, to any Place in Possession of His Majesty. (Repealed by Customs Law Repeal Act 1825 (6 Geo. 4. c. 105))
Stamps (Ireland) Act 1807 (repealed)	47 Geo. 3 Sess. 1. c. 50	25 April 1807
An Act to repeal the several Duties under the Care of the Commissioners for managing the Stamp Duties in Ireland, and to grant new and additional Duties in lieu thereof; and to amend the Laws relating to the Stamp Duties in Ireland. (Repealed by Statute Law Revision Act 1861 (24 & 25 Vict. c. 101))
Customs Act 1807 (repealed)	47 Geo. 3 Sess. 1. c. 51	25 April 1807
An Act to extend the Provisions of an Act made in the last Session of Parliament, for abolishing Fees received by certain Officers and other Persons employed in the Service of the Customs in the Port of London, and for regulating the Attendance of Officers and others so employed, to the Out-Ports; and to appropriate the Fees of certain abolished and vacant Offices in the Customs to The Superannuation Fund. (Repealed by Customs Law Repeal Act 1825 (6 Geo. 4. c. 105))
Greenwich Hospital Act 1807	47 Geo. 3 Sess. 1. c. 52	25 April 1807
An Act for enabling His Majesty to grant the Palace, called The King's House with the Appurtenances, situate in Greenwich Park, in the County of Kent, to the Commissioners for the Government of The Royal Naval Asylum, and for enabling the said Commissioners to appoint a Chaplain to officiate therein.
Regrating and Ingrossing of Oaken Bark Act 1807 (repealed)	47 Geo. 3 Sess. 1. c. 53	25 April 1807
An Act to suspend for Twelve Months so much of an Act of the Second Year of King James the First, intituled, "An Act concerning Tanners, Curriers, Shoemakers, and other Artificers, occupying the cutting of Leather," (Note: Leather Act 1603 (2 Jas. 1. c. 22)) as prohibits the regrating and ingrossing of Oaken Bark. (Repealed by Statute Law Revision Act 1872 (No. 2) (35 & 36 Vict. c. 97))
Quartering of Soldiers Act 1807 (repealed)	47 Geo. 3 Sess. 1. c. 54	25 April 1807
An Act for increasing the Rates of Subsistence to be paid to Innkeepers and others on quartering Soldiers. (Repealed by Statute Law Revision Act 1872 (No. 2) (35 & 36 Vict. c. 97))
Charge of Loan Act 1807 (repealed)	47 Geo. 3 Sess. 1. c. 55	25 April 1807
An Act for charging the Sum of Twelve Millions, Part of the Loan of Twelve Millions two hundred thousand Pounds, raised for the Service of Great Britain for the Year One thousand eight hundred and seven, upon the Duties of Customs and Excise granted to His Majesty during the Continuance of the present War, and for certain Periods after the Ratification of a Definitive Treaty of Peace, and for providing a Sinking Fund for the Redemption of the Stocks or Funds thereby created. (Repealed by Statute Law Revision Act 1861 (24 & 25 Vict. c. 101))
Treasurer of the Navy Act 1807 (repealed)	47 Geo. 3 Sess. 1. c. 56	25 April 1807
An Act for the further regulating the Office of Treasurer of His Majesty's Navy. (Repealed by Treasurer of the Navy Act 1830 (11 Geo. 4 & 1 Will. 4. c. 42))

=== Local acts ===
Short title	Citation	Royal assent
Long title
Bowyer's Lottery Act 1807 (repealed)	47 Geo. 3 Sess. 1. c. i	19 February 1807
An Act for extending the Term, and altering the Powers, of an Act made in the Forty-fifth Year of His present Majesty, intituled, "An Act for enable Robert Bowyer of Pall Mall, in the City of Westminster, Esquire, to dispose of his Collection of Paintings, Drawings, and Engravings, together with several Copies of certain Books therein mentioned, by way of Chance." (Note: Bowyer's Lottery Act 1805 (45 Geo. 3. c. xxiv)) (Repealed by Statute Law (Repeals) Act 2013 (c. 2))
Bideford Roads Act 1807 (repealed)	47 Geo. 3 Sess. 1. c. ii	17 March 1807
An Act to continue and amend Two Acts, passed in the Fourth (Note: Bideford Roads Act 1785 (4 Geo. 3. c. 87)) and Twenty-fifth (Note: Bideford Roads Act 1764 (25 Geo. 3. c. 119)) Years of His present Majesty, for repairing and widening several Roads leading from the Town of Bideford, in the County of Devon. (Repealed by Bideford Roads Act 1824 (5 Geo. 4. c. cxv))
Ashbourne and Belpar, and Belpar and Ripley Roads Act 1807 (repealed)	47 Geo. 3 Sess. 1. c. iii	17 March 1807
An Act to continue and amend Two Acts, made in the Fourth (Note: Derby Roads Act 1764 (4 Geo. 3. c. 82)) and Twenty-fifth (Note: Derby Roads Act 1785 (25 Geo. 3. c. 121)) Years of His present Majesty, for repairing the Road from Ashborne, in the County of Derby, over Belpar Bridge, to the present Turnpike Road from Sheffield and Chesterfield to Derby at or near a Place called Openwood Gate and from Belpar Bridge to Ripley in the County of Derby. (Repealed by Ashbourne and Belper Bridge Road Act 1830 (11 Geo. 4 & 1 Will. 4. c. cxxx))
Blackheath, &c. Court of Requests Act 1807 (repealed)	47 Geo. 3 Sess. 1. c. iv	17 March 1807
An Act for extending to Sums of greater Amount than Forty Shillings, the Provisions of Three Acts passed in the Fifth, (Note: Small Debts, Blackheath, etc. Act 1765 (5 Geo. 3. c. 8)) Sixth, (Note: Small Debts, Kent, etc. Act 1766 (6 Geo. 3. c. 6)) and Tenth (Note: Blackheath, etc., Small Debts Act 1770 (10 Geo. 3. c. 29)) Years of His present Majesty, for the Recovery of Small Debts within the Hundreds of Blackheath, Bromley and Beckenham, Rokesley otherwise Ruxley, and Little and Lessness, in the County of Kent, and of Wallington, in the County of Surrey, and for amending the said Acts. (Repealed by Surrey and Kent Courts of Request Act 1836 (6 & 7 Will. 4. c. cxx))
Thetford and Newmarket Road Act 1807 (repealed)	47 Geo. 3 Sess. 1. c. v	17 March 1807
An Act to continue and amend Two Acts, passed in the Eighth (Note: Thetford and Newmarket Road Act 1768 (8 Geo. 3. c. 55)) and Tenth (Note: Thetford and Newmarket Road Act 1770 (10 Geo. 3. c. 60)) Years of His present Majesty, for amending the Road from Christopher's Bridge, in the Borough of Thetford, in the County of Suffolk, to the North East End of the Town of Newmarket, in the County of Cambridge. (Repealed by Thetford and Newmarket Road Act 1828 (9 Geo. 4. c. li))
Road from Upottery to Horton Act 1807 (repealed)	47 Geo. 3 Sess. 1. c. vi	17 March 1807
An Act for repairing and improving the Road from the Honiton Turnpike Road, near Yard Farm, in the Parish of Upottery, in the County of Devon, to the Ilminster Turnpike Road, near the Village of Horton, in the Parish of Ilminster, in the County of Somerset. (Repealed by Road from Upottery to Ilminster Act 1828 (9 Geo. 4. c. xlviii))
Westminster and Middlesex Sewers Act 1807	47 Geo. 3 Sess. 1. c. vii	17 March 1807
An Act to enlarge the Powers and extend the Jurisdiction of the Commissioners of Sewers for the City and Liberty of Westminster, and Part of the County of Middlesex.
Road from Chapel-en-le-Frith to Enterclough Bridge Act 1807 (repealed)	47 Geo. 3 Sess. 1. c. viii	23 March 1807
An Act for continuing the Term and altering and enlarging the Powers of an Act passed in the Thirty-second Year of His present Majesty, (Note: Derby and Cheshire Roads Act 1792 (32 Geo. 3. c. 128)) for repairing and improving the Road from the Town of Chapel-en-le-Frith, to or near to, Enterclough Bridge, in the County of Derby, and other Roads therein mentioned, in the said County, and in the County Palatine of Chester. (Repealed by Road from Chapel-en-le-Frith to Enterclough Bridge Act 1827 (7 & 8 Geo. 4. c. xxv))
Muckley Corner, Walsall and Leigh Brook Road Act 1807 (repealed)	47 Geo. 3 Sess. 1. c. ix	23 March 1807
An Act for enlarging the Terms and Powers of Two Acts, of the Sixth (Note: Stafford Roads (No. 4) Act 1766 (6 Geo. 3. c. 99)) and Twenty-seventh (Note: Stafford Roads (No. 2) Act 1787 (27 Geo. 3. c. 90)) Years of His present Majesty, for repairing and widening the Road from Muckley Corner to Walsall and Wednesbury, and to Leigh Brook and Ocker Hill, and several other Roads in the County of Stafford, so far as the same relate to the Two first Districts of Road therein comprized. (Repealed by Walsall and Muckley Corner Road Act 1830 (11 Geo. 4 & 1 Will. 4. c. cvi))
Chertsey Parish Church Act 1807	47 Geo. 3 Sess. 1. c. x	23 March 1807
An Act for enabling the Trustees for executing an Act, passed in the Forty-sixth Year of His present Majesty intituled, "An Act for taking down and rebuilding the Body of the Parish Church of Chertsey in the County of Surrey, and for repairing the Tower thereof, and building a Vestry Room near or adjoining to the said Church," (Note: Chertsey Parish Church Act 1806 (46 Geo. 3. c. iv)) to raise a further Sum of Money for completing the Purposes of the said Act.
Roads in Fife Act 1807 (repealed)	47 Geo. 3 Sess. 1. c. xi	23 March 1807
An Act for continuing the Term and altering and enlarging the Powers of Two Acts, passed in the Thirtieth (Note: Fife Roads Act 1790 (30 Geo. 3. c. 93)) and Thirty-seventh (Note: Fife Roads Act 1797 (37 Geo. 3. c. 180)) Years of His present Majesty, for making and repairing certain Roads in the County of Fife, and for making and keeping in Repair several other Roads in the said County. (Repealed by Fife Turnpike Roads Act 1829 (10 Geo. 4. c. lxxxiv))
Statute Labour, Highways, Bridges and Ferries in Fife Act 1807	47 Geo. 3 Sess. 1. c. xii	23 March 1807
An Act for further regulating and converting the Statute Labour in the County of Fife, and for more effectually making and repairing the Highways, Bridges, and Ferries, within the said County.
Statute Labour, Roads and Bridges in Ross, Cromarty and Nairn Act 1807	47 Geo. 3 Sess. 1. c. xiii	23 March 1807
An Act for regulating and converting the Statute Labour, in the Counties of Ross and Cromarty, and that Part of the County of Nairn which is locally situated in the County of Ross; and for more effectually making and repairing the Roads and Bridges within the same; and for making and maintaining the great Post Road from the Confines of Invernessshire to the Confines of the Shire of Sutherland.
Birmingham and Deritend Court of Requests Act 1807 (repealed)	47 Geo. 3 Sess. 1. c. xiv	23 March 1807
An Act to alter, amend, and enlarge the Powers of an Act, passed in the Twenty-fifth Year of His late Majesty, (Note: Small Debts, Birmingham Act 1751 (25 Geo. 2. c. 34)) for the more easy and speedy Recovery of Small Debts within the Town of Birmingham and Hamlet of Deritend thereto adjoining, in the County of Warwick. (Repealed by County Courts Act 1846 (9 & 10 Vict. c. 95))
St. Martin's (Birmingham) Churchyard and Burial Ground Act 1807	47 Geo. 3 Sess. 1. c. xv	23 March 1807
An Act for enlarging the Church-yard belonging to the Parish of Saint Martin, in the Town of Birmingham, in the County of Warwick, and for providing an additional Cemetery or Burial Ground for the Use of the said Parish.
Porthaethwy Ferry and Holyhead Road Act 1807 (repealed)	47 Geo. 3 Sess. 1. c. xvi	23 March 1807
An Act for continuing the Term, and altering and enlarging the Powers, of Two Acts, passed in the Fifth (Note: Anglesey Roads Act 1765 (5 Geo. 3. c. 56)) and Fifteenth (Note: Holyhead Roads Act 1775 (15 Geo. 3. c. 69)) Years of His present Majesty, for repairing and widening the Road leading from Porthaethwy Ferry (Note: The Porthaethwy Ferry crossed the Menai Straights, and landed at the Porth y Wrach slipway in what is now known as Menai Bridge. 53°13′26″N 4°09′41″W) to Holyhead, in the County of Anglesey. (Repealed by Roads between London and Holyhead Act 1819 (59 Geo. 3. c. 48))
Elsdon Inclosure Act 1807	47 Geo. 3 Sess. 1. c. xvii	23 March 1807
An Act for inclosing Lands in the Parish of Elsdon, in the County of Northumberland.
Corsenside Inclosure Act 1807	47 Geo. 3 Sess. 1. c. xviii	23 March 1807
An Act for inclosing Lands in the Parish of Corsenside, within the Manor of Ridsdale, in the County of Northumberland.
Irstead Inclosure Act 1807	47 Geo. 3 Sess. 1. c. xix	23 March 1807
An Act for inclosing Lands in the Parish of Irstead, in the County of Norfolk.
Basford Inclosure Act 1807	47 Geo. 3 Sess. 1. c. xx	23 March 1807
An Act for inclosing Lands in the Liberty or Township of Basford, in the Parish of Cheddleton, in the County of Stafford.
Lord Vernon's Marriage Settlement Act 1807	47 Geo. 3 Sess. 1. c. xxi	23 March 1807
An Act for vesting in new Trustees certain Trust Estates comprized in the Settlement made on the Marriage of the Right Honourable George Venables Lord Vernon, with Louisa Barbara Lady Vernon his late Wife.
Sandwich, Margate and Ramsgate Road Act 1807 (repealed)	47 Geo. 3 Sess. 1. c. xxii	23 March 1807
An Act for amending, altering, widening, and keeping in Repair, the Road from the Town and Port of Sandwich, in the County of Kent, to the respective Towns of Margate and Ramsgate, in the Isle of Thanet, in the said County; and for reducing, for a limited Time, the Tolls and Duties now payable at Sandwich Bridge, by virtue of an Act, passed in the Twenty-eighth Year of His late Majesty. (Note: Sandwich Bridge Act 1755 (28 Geo. 2. c. 55)) (Repealed by Sandwich and Ramsgate Road and Sandwich Bridge Act 1828 (9 Geo. 4. c. lxxxv))
Selkirk Roads Act 1807 (repealed)	47 Geo. 3 Sess. 1. c. xxiii	23 March 1807
An Act for repealing Two Acts made in the Eighth (Note: Selkirk Roads Act 1768 (8 Geo. 3. c. 59)) and Eleventh (Note: Selkirk Roads Act 1771 (11 Geo. 3. c. 60)) Years of His present Majesty, for repairing several Roads leading through the County of Selkirk, and for the better making and repairing the said Roads, and other Roads in the said County. (Repealed by Selkirk Roads Act 1828 (9 Geo. 4. c. cix))
Road from Scots Dyke to Haremoss Act 1807 (repealed)	47 Geo. 3 Sess. 1. c. xxiv	25 April 1807
An Act for repealing Two Acts, made in the Fourth (Note: Dumfries and Roxburgh Roads Act 1764 (4 Geo. 3. c. 85)) and Twenty-fifth (Note: Dumfries Roads Act 1785 (25 Geo. 3. c. 120)) Years of His present Majesty, for repairing and widening the Road from Scots Dyke, in the County of Dumfries, by or through the Villages of Langholm and Hawick, to Haremoss, in the County of Roxburgh, and for the better making, repairing, and keeping in Repair the said Road. (Repealed by Road from Scots Dyke to Haremoss Act 1829 (10 Geo. 4. c. lx))
Road from Foxley Hatch to Reigate Act 1807 (repealed)	47 Geo. 3 Sess. 1. c. xxv	25 April 1807
An Act for making and maintaining a Road from Foxley Hatch, in the Parish of Croydon, into the Town of Reigate, in the County of Surrey. (Repealed by Road from Foxley Hatch to Reigate Act 1827 (7 & 8 Geo. 4. c. xiii))
Wisbech and Walsoken Roads Act 1807 (repealed)	47 Geo. 3 Sess. 1. c. xxvi	25 April 1807
An Act for continuing the Term, and altering and enlarging the Powers, of Two Acts, passed in the Fifth (Note: Norfolk Roads (No. 2) Act 1765 (5 Geo. 3. c. 101)) and Twenty-sixth (Note: Norfolk Roads Act 1786 (26 Geo. 3. c. 127)) Years of His present Majesty, for repairing the Roads from the Little Bridge over the End of the Drain next Wisbeach River, lying between Roper's Fields and the Bell Inn in Wisbeach, and the Isle of Ely, to the Sign of the Bear in Walsoken, in the County of Norfolk, and several other Roads in the said Acts mentioned. (Repealed by Wisbech and King's Lynn Roads Act 1823 (4 Geo. 4. c. lv))
Minehead, Dunster and Watchet Roads Act 1807	47 Geo. 3 Sess. 1. c. xxvii	25 April 1807
An Act for continuing the Term, and altering and enlarging the Powers, of Two Acts, passed in the Fifth (Note: Somerset and Devon Roads Act 1765 (5 Geo. 3. c. 93)) and Twenty-sixth (Note: Minehead Roads Act 1786 (26 Geo. 3. c. 136)) Years of His present Majesty, for repairing several Roads leading from the Town of Minehead, and from Dunster and Watchet, in the County of Somerset, and for improving certain other Roads therein described, in the said County.
Bridewell Hospital Chapel Act 1807 (repealed)	47 Geo. 3 Sess. 1. c. xxviii	25 April 1807
An Act for granting to the Chapel lately rebuilt in the Royal Hospital of Bridewell, all the Rights and Privileges belonging to the former Chapel of the said Hospital, lately taken down. (Repealed by Statute Law (Repeals) Act 2013 (c. 2))
River Tweed Fisheries Act 1807 (repealed)	47 Geo. 3 Sess. 1. c. xxix	25 April 1807
An Act to amend and render more effectual Three Acts, made in the Eleventh, (Note: Tweed Fisheries Act 1771 (11 Geo. 3. c. 27)) Fifteenth, (Note: Tweed Fisheries Act 1775 (15 Geo. 3. c. 46)) and Thirty-seventh (Note: Tweed Fisheries Act 1797 (37 Geo. 3. c. 48)) Years of His present Majesty, for the Regulation and Improvement of the Fisheries of the River Tweed. (Repealed by River Tweed Fisheries Act 1830 (11 Geo. 4 & 1 Will. 4. c. liv))
Globe Insurance Company Act 1807	47 Geo. 3 Sess. 1. c. xxx	25 April 1807
An Act to enable The Globe Insurance Company to sue in the Name of their Treasurer, and to inrol Annuities.
Albion Fire and Life Insurance Company Act 1807	47 Geo. 3 Sess. 1. c. xxxi	25 April 1807
An Act to enable The Albion Fire and Life Insurance Company to sue in the Name of their Secretary, and to inroll Annuities.
London Life Association Act 1807 (repealed)	47 Geo. 3 Sess. 1. c. xxxii	25 April 1807
An Act to enable The London Life Association to sue in the Name of their President, and to enroll Annuities. (Repealed by London Life Association Act 1894 (57 & 58 Vict. c. xiv))
Pelican Life Insurance Company Act 1807 (repealed)	47 Geo. 3 Sess. 1. c. xxxiii	25 April 1807
An Act to enable The Pelican Life Insurance Company to sue in the Name of their Secretary, and to inroll Annuities. (Repealed by Pelican Life Insurance Company's Act 1891 (54 & 55 Vict. c. lxxx))
Provident Institution Act 1807 (repealed)	47 Geo. 3 Sess. 1. c. xxxiv	25 April 1807
An Act to enable The Provident Institution to sue in the Name of their managing Director, and to inroll Annuities. (Repealed by Provident Life Office Act 1889 (52 & 53 Vict. c. cxliii))
Sandwich and Ramsgate Court of Requests Act 1807 (repealed)	47 Geo. 3 Sess. 1. c. xxxv	25 April 1807
An Act for the more easy and speedy Recovery of Small Debts within the Town and Port of Sandwich, and the Vills of Ramsgate and Sarr, and the Parishes of Minster, Saint Lawrence, Stonar, Monkton, and Saint Nicholas, in the Isle of Thanet; Walmer, Ash next Sandwich, Eastry, Wingham, Staple, Goodnestone next Wingham, Chillenden, Nonnington, Woodnesborough otherwise Winsborow, Εγthorne, Word otherwise Worth, Elmstone, Preston next Wingham, Ickham, Wickhambreux, Waldershare, Barfreston, Shepherdswell otherwise Sibbertswould, Wymenswould, Barham, Patrixbourn, Bishopbourn, Beaksbourn, Littlebourn, Stodmarsh, and Stourmouth, in the County of Kent. (Repealed by County Courts Act 1846 (9 & 10 Vict. c. 95))
Halesowen, &c. Court of Requests Act 1807 (repealed)	47 Geo. 3 Sess. 1. c. xxxvi	25 April 1807
An Act for the more easy and speedy Recovery of Small Debts within the Parishes of Hales Owen, Rowley Regis, Harbourne, West Bromwich, Tipton, and the Manor of Bradley, in the Counties of Worcester Salop and Stafford. (Repealed by County Courts Act 1846 (9 & 10 Vict. c. 95))
Elloe, Surfleet and Gosberton Court of Requests Act 1807 (repealed)	47 Geo. 3 Sess. 1. c. xxxvii	25 April 1807
An Act to alter and enlarge the Powers of an Act, passed in the Fifteenth Year of His present Majesty, (Note: Elloe, Lincoln (Small Debts) Act 1775 (15 Geo. 3. c. 64)) for the more easy and speedy Recovery of Small Debts within the Hundred of Elloe, in the County of Lincoln, and for extending the Jurisdiction of the Court constituted by the said Act to the Parishes of Surfleet and Gosberton, in the Hundred of Kirton, in the said County. (Repealed by County Courts Act 1846 (9 & 10 Vict. c. 95))
St. Giles-in-the-Fields, Bloomsbury and Holborn Improvement Act 1807 (repealed)	47 Geo. 3 Sess. 1. c. xxxviii	25 April 1807
An Act for altering and enlarging so much of the Powers of several Acts, made in the Second, (Note: London Streets Act 1762 (2 Geo. 3. c. 21)) Third, (Note: London Streets Act 1763 (3 Geo. 3. c. 23)) Fourth, (Note: Westminster Streets Act 1763 (4 Geo. 3. c. 39)) Fifth, (Note: Westminster Streets (No. 2) Act 1765 (5 Geo. 3. c. 50)) Eleventh, (Note: Westminster (Streets) Act 1771 (11 Geo. 3. c. 22)) Fourteenth, (Note: Westminster (Watching) Act 1774 (14 Geo. 3. c. 90)) and Thirtieth (Note: Westminster Improvements Act 1790 (30 Geo. 3. c. 53)) Years of His present Majesty, for paving, cleansing, lighting, and watching the Streets and other Places within the City and Liberty of Westminster and Parts adjacent, as relate to the Parishes of Saint Giles in the Fields and Saint George Bloomsbury, in the County of Middlesex, and to certain Places called Holborn above the Bars, and Middle Row, in Holborn, in the said County, and for the better Regulation of the Nightly Watch of the said Parishes. (Repealed by London Government (City of Westminster) Order in Council 1901 (SR&O 1901/278))
Martham Inclosure and Drainage Act 1807	47 Geo. 3 Sess. 1. c. xxxix	25 April 1807
An Act for inclosing and draining certain Lands in the Parish of Martham, in the County of Norfolk.
Moyser Estate Partition Act 1807	47 Geo. 3 Sess. 1. c. xl	25 April 1807
An Act for enabling certain Persons therein named to carry into Execution a Partition lately made under a Decree of His Majesty's High Court of Chancery, of the Moyser Estate, in the County of York, and the County of the City of York, on the Part of the Reverend Richard Gee, Robert Whyte Esquire, and Thomas Metcalfe Esquire.
Crosby Inclosure Act 1807	47 Geo. 3 Sess. 1. c. xli	25 April 1807
An Act for inclosing Lands in the Township of Crosby, in the Parishes of Frodingham and Flixborough, in the County of Lincoln.
Mere Inclosure Act 1807	47 Geo. 3 Sess. 1. c. xlii	25 April 1807
An Act for inclosing Lands in the Parish of Mere, in the County of Wilts.
Repps-with-Bastwick and Eccles-next-the-Sea Inclosure and Drainage Act 1807	47 Geo. 3 Sess. 1. c. xliii	27 April 1807
An Act for inclosing and draining Lands, within the Parishes of Repps with Bastwick, and Eccles next the Sea, in the County of Norfolk.

=== Private acts ===
Short title	Citation	Royal assent
Long title
Monzani's Naturalization Act 1807	47 Geo. 3 Sess. 1. c. 1 Pr.	16 January 1807
An Act for naturalizing Tebaldo Monzani.
Schenck's Naturalization Act 1807	47 Geo. 3 Sess. 1. c. 2 Pr.	22 January 1807
An Act for naturalizing Jean Jaques Schenck.
Lord De Dunstanville's Indemnity Act 1807	47 Geo. 3 Sess. 1. c. 3 Pr.	19 February 1807
An Act to relieve Francis Lord De Dunstanville from certain Disabilities and Penalties in consequence of his having sat in the House of Peers during a Debate therein without being duly qualified by taking the Oaths and making the Declaration prescribed by Law and subscribing the same respectively.
Cossington Inclosure Act 1807	47 Geo. 3 Sess. 1. c. 4 Pr.	19 February 1807
An Act for inclosing a certain Tract of Commonable Land, in the Parish of Cossington, in the County of Somerset.
Downhatherley Inclosure Act 1807	47 Geo. 3 Sess. 1. c. 5 Pr.	19 February 1807
An Act for inclosing Lands in the Parish of Downhatherley, in the County of Gloucester.
Lallernand's Naturalization Act 1807	47 Geo. 3 Sess. 1. c. 6 Pr.	19 February 1807
An Act for naturalizing Aimé Lallernand.
Kerckhove's Naturalization Act 1807	47 Geo. 3 Sess. 1. c. 7 Pr.	19 February 1807
An Act for naturalizing John Vanden Kerckhove.
Duerr's Naturalization Act 1807	47 Geo. 3 Sess. 1. c. 8 Pr.	17 March 1807
An Act for naturalizing Frederick Duerr.
Fleming's Naturalization Act 1807	47 Geo. 3 Sess. 1. c. 9 Pr.	17 March 1807
An Act for naturalizing John Lewis Fleming.
Zacharias' Naturalization Act 1807	47 Geo. 3 Sess. 1. c. 10 Pr.	17 March 1807
An Act for naturalizing David Constantine Zacharias.
Overbeck's Naturalization Act 1807	47 Geo. 3 Sess. 1. c. 11 Pr.	17 March 1807
An Act for naturalizing John James Overbeck.
Alne Inclosure Act 1807	47 Geo. 3 Sess. 1. c. 12 Pr.	23 March 1807
An Act for inclosing Lands in the Township of Alne, in the North Riding of the County of York.
Middle Inclosure Act 1807	47 Geo. 3 Sess. 1. c. 13 Pr.	23 March 1807
An Act for inclosing the Commons and Waste Lands in the Parish of Middle, in the County of Salop.
Amalric's Naturalization Act 1807	47 Geo. 3 Sess. 1. c. 14 Pr.	25 March 1807
An Act for naturalizing Andrew Amalric and Francis Amalric an Infant.
Membury Inclosure Act 1807	47 Geo. 3 Sess. 1. c. 15 Pr.	9 April 1807
An Act for inclosing Lands in the Parish of Membury, in the County of Devon.
Stalham Inclosure Act 1807	47 Geo. 3 Sess. 1. c. 16 Pr.	9 April 1807
An Act for inclosing Lands in the Parish of Stalham, in the County of Norfolk.
Halifax Inclosure Act 1807	47 Geo. 3 Sess. 1. c. 17 Pr.	9 April 1807
An Act for inclosing Lands in the Parish of Halifax, in the West Riding of the County of York.
Ringwood Inclosure Act 1807	47 Geo. 3 Sess. 1. c. 18 Pr.	9 April 1807
An Act for inclosing Lands in the Parish of Ringwood, in the County of Southampton.
Oundle and Ashton Inclosure Act 1807	47 Geo. 3 Sess. 1. c. 19 Pr.	25 April 1807
An Act for inclosing Lands in Oundle, and in the Hamlet of Ashton, in the Parish of Oundle, in the County of Northampton.
Hopemansel Inclosure Act 1807	47 Geo. 3 Sess. 1. c. 20 Pr.	25 April 1807
An Act for inclosing Lands in the Parish of Hopemansel, in the County of Hereford.
West Bagborough Inclosure Act 1807	47 Geo. 3 Sess. 1. c. 21 Pr.	25 April 1807
An Act for inclosing Lands in the Parish of West Bagborough, in the County of Somerset
Much Wenlock Inclosure Act 1807	47 Geo. 3 Sess. 1. c. 22 Pr.	25 April 1807
An Act for inclosing Westwood Common, in the Parish of Much Wenlock, in the County of Salop.
Ilchester, &c. Inclosure Act 1807	47 Geo. 3 Sess. 1. c. 23 Pr.	25 April 1807
An Act for inclosing Lands in the Parishes of Ilchester, Stoke-under-Hambden, Tintinhull, Ashington, and Lymington, in the County of Somerset.
Backwell Inclosure Act 1807	47 Geo. 3 Sess. 1. c. 24 Pr.	25 April 1807
An Act for inclosing Lands in the Parish of Backwell, in the County of Somerset.
Corfe-Mullen Inclosure Act 1807	47 Geo. 3 Sess. 1. c. 25 Pr.	25 April 1807
An Act for inclosing Lands in the Parish of Corfe Mullen, in the County of Dorset
Salford Inclosure Act 1807	47 Geo. 3 Sess. 1. c. 26 Pr.	25 April 1807
An Act for inclosing Lands in the Manor and Parish of Salford, in the County of Bedford.
Fritwell Inclosure Act 1807	47 Geo. 3 Sess. 1. c. 27 Pr.	25 April 1807
An Act for inclosing Lands in the Manor and Parish of Fritwell, in the County of Oxford.
Queenhill Inclosure Act 1807	47 Geo. 3 Sess. 1. c. 28 Pr.	25 April 1807
An Act for inclosing Lands in the Hamlet or Chapelry of Queenhill, in the Parish of Ripple, in the County of Worcester.
Fagel's Naturalization Act 1807	47 Geo. 3 Sess. 1. c. 29 Pr.	25 April 1807
An Act for naturalizing Francis William Fagell.
Newport Pagnell Inclosure Act 1807	47 Geo. 3 Sess. 1. c. 30 Pr.	27 April 1807
An Act for inclosing Lands in the Parish of Newport Pagnell, in the County of Buckingham.

=== Sources ===
- "47° Geo. III Sess. 1". The Statutes at Large. Vol. 47 George III. 1807. Sess. 1 & 2. London. 1807. pp. 1–243 – via Google Books.
- "Sess. 1806–7". Journal of the House of Commons. Vol. 62. London: His Majesty's Stationery Office. pp. 3–366 – via Google Books.
- Chronological Table of and Index to the Statutes. Vol. 1: To the End of the Session 59 Vict. Sess. 2 (1895) (13th ed.). London: Her Majesty's Stationery Office. 1896. pp. 185–186 – via Google Books.

== See also ==
- List of acts of the Parliament of the United Kingdom
