= Cliffsend =

Village in Kent, England

Coordinates: 51.328970°N 1.365910°E

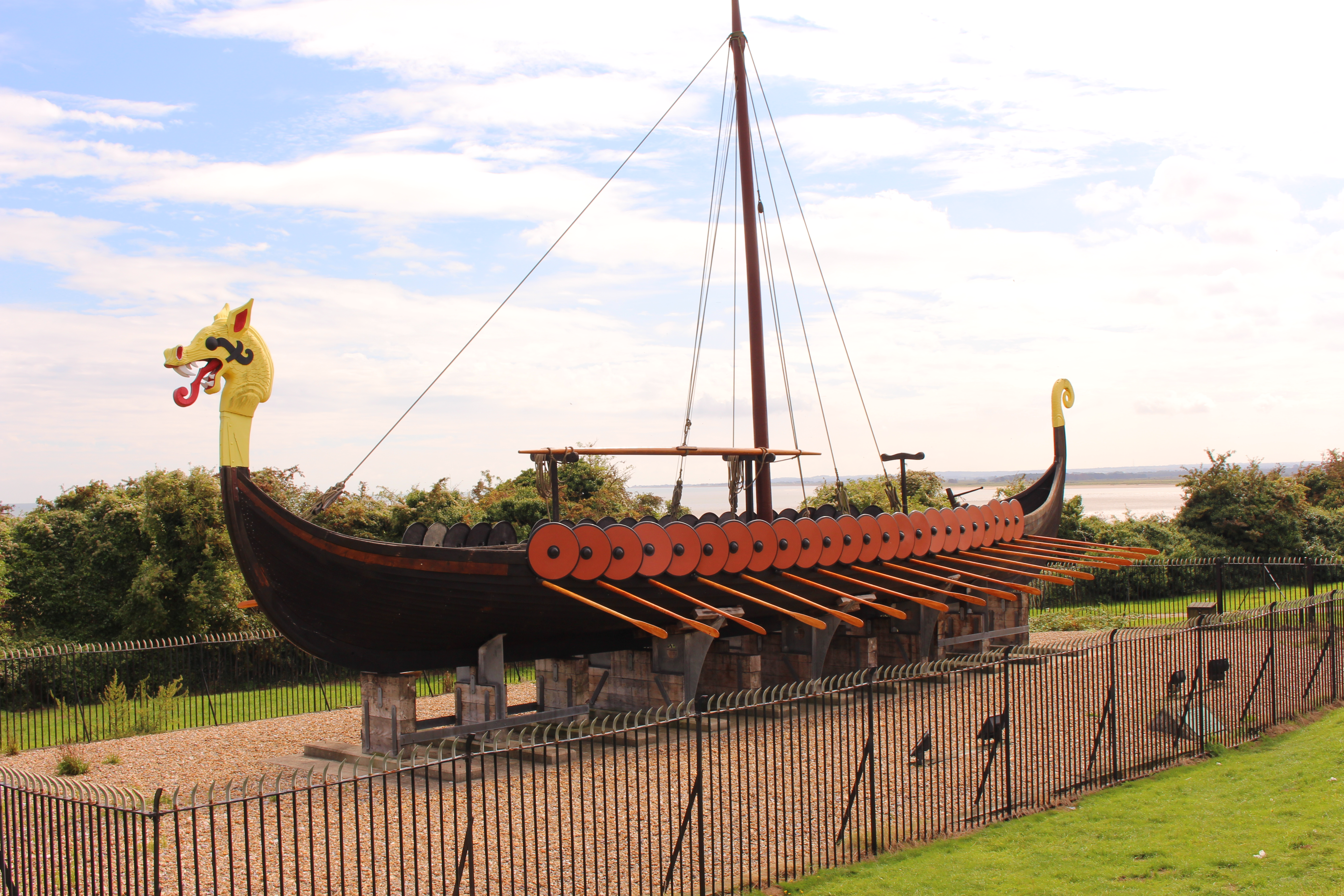
- Hugin, a replica Viking ship

- Location within Kent
- Interactive map of Cliffsend
- Population: 1,822 (2011)
- OS grid reference: TR344643
- Civil parish: Cliffsend
- District: Thanet
- Shire county: Kent
- Region: South East
- Country: England
- Sovereign state: United Kingdom
- Post town: RAMSGATE
- Postcode district: CT12
- Dialling code: 01843
- Police: Kent
- Fire: Kent
- Ambulance: South East Coast
- UK Parliament: East Thanet

Cliffsend is a village (sometimes written, correctly, as Cliffs End) and civil parish situated almost 2 miles (3 km) west of Ramsgate, Kent, United Kingdom, in the Thanet local government district.

Hengist and Horsa landed near here in 410AD, and St Augustine in 597.

There is evidence to show that the area of Cliffsend Village was inhabited since ancient times. Excavations prior to a housing development at Cliffs End Farm in 2003/2004 revealed artefacts and a burial site dating to the Bronze Age. Pegwell Bay Country Park is located here. Also on permanent display on the cliff top at Pegwell Bay is a replica of the Viking longship Hugin, which sailed from Denmark to Thanet in 1949 to celebrate the 1500th anniversary of the invasion of Britain, the traditional landing of the two men, and the betrothal of Hengist's daughter, Rowena, to King Vortigen of Kent. The Hugin was offered as a gift to Ramsgate and Broadstairs by the Daily Mail for preservation.

== Amenities ==
The village is the site of several local tourist attractions, including 'The Viking Ship', which is a restored replica Viking Ship similar to that which landed on the site during the invasion of Hengist and Horsa. The ship sits on the cliff top, on open grass. This overlooks Pegwell Bay nature reserve and the now disused Ramsgate Hoverport. On a clear day, visitors can see a large expanse of east Kent to the West, Sandwich, Deal, and the northern tip of the French Coast. To the east, the cliffs curve round into the nearby town of Ramsgate

The village has a golf club, St Augustine's GC. Though the village has no hotels itself, both Ramsgate (2 km) and Minster (4 km) have numerous facilities.

The Anglican parish church of St Mary is in Foads Lane. Originally a Methodist church it was rented by the Church of England from the early 1930s, eventually being bought in 1956.

== Governance ==
Cliffsend is part of the electoral ward called Cliffsend and Pegwell. The population of this ward at the 2011 Census was 4,703.

The parish council was created in 2003.

== Notable residents ==
Although a small area with an accordingly low population, Cliffsend has had notable residents.

- Jefferson Hack lived in Beech Grove for much of his childhood and early adult life.
- A notable couple in the acting and entertainment world are Melanie and Martina Grant
- Augustine of Canterbury briefly lived in the Cliffs End area around the year 597.

== Transport ==
The village is between the A299, the end of the Thanet Way, and the A256, which meet at the Lord of the Manor roundabouts to the east of the village.

The village is divided into two by the Canterbury to Ramsgate railway line, with a station at Thanet Parkway which opened in 2023.

Manston Airport is to the north of the village, with the east end of the runway preventing the village expanding northwards. The airport partially closed in May 2014.

At the south east corner of the village are the remains of Hoverlloyd's cross-channel hoverport. Vehicle and passenger carrying hovercraft were operated here from 1969 until 1982.

The New East Kent Access Road intersects the village at the same point as the railway line, though here it is in a tunnel, so the effect on the village is minimal. Both the A299 and A256 have been diverted onto new roads in this scheme; the former A299 and A256 remain in place to serve the village. Access from the new road to the village can be gained from the Thanet Intersection southwards, from Ebbfleet Roundabout eastwards, from the Sevenscore roundabout along Cottington road, and at Cliffsend roundabout heading eastwards.

== See also ==
- Listed buildings in Cliffsend
