= A256 =

A256 may refer to:

- A256 road, a road running through East Kent in England
- A256 motorway (Netherlands)
