= Lord of the Manor, Kent =

Former pub in Cliffsend, Kent, England

Coordinates: 51°20′09″N 1°22′50.9″E

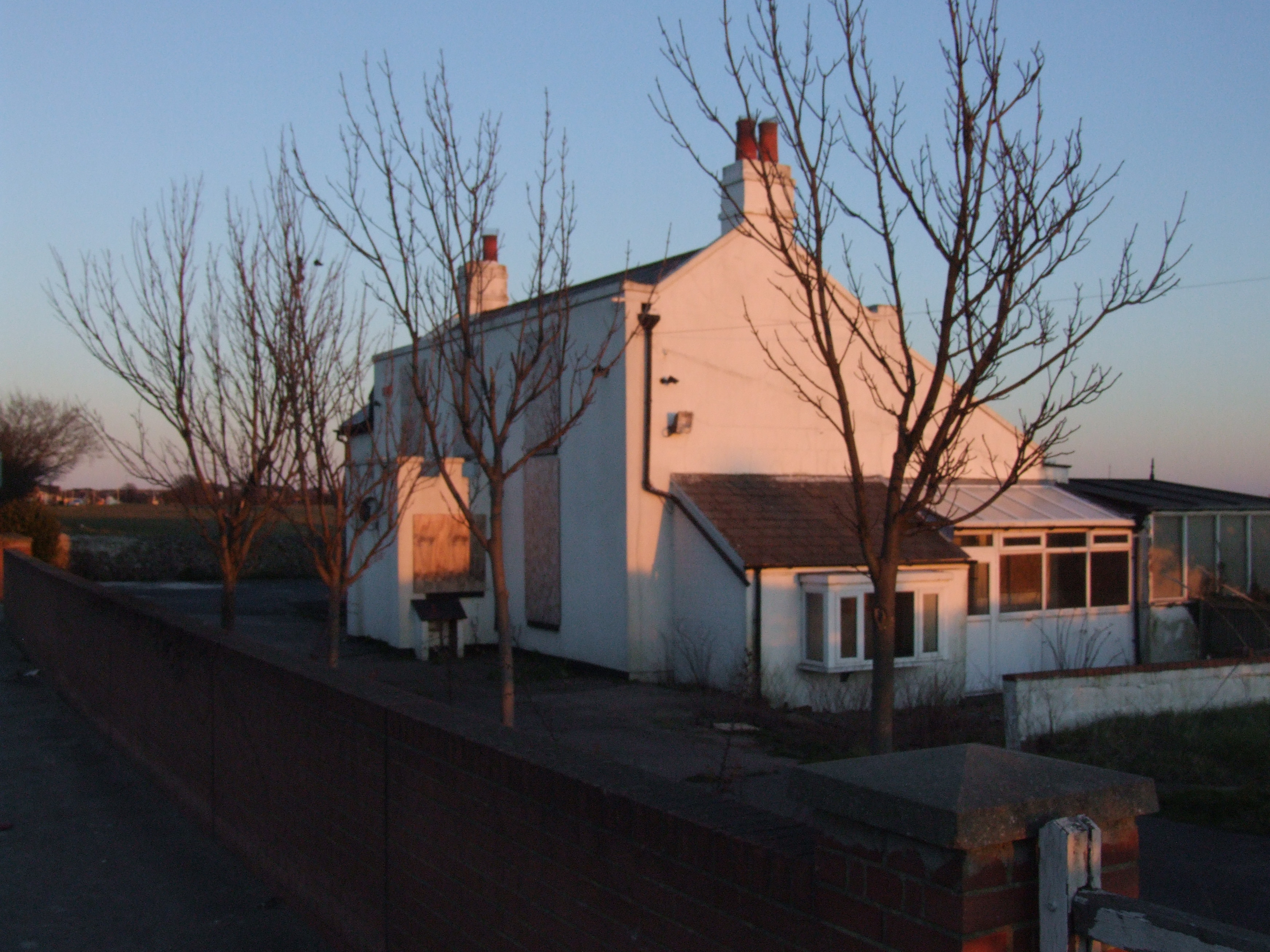
The former pub in 2010

The Lord of the Manor is a former pub and road junction near Cliffsend on the Isle of Thanet in Kent. Two main roads, the A299 and A256 meet here and connect Thanet to the rest of the country.

== History ==
The pub was on the southeast corner of a crossroads; one carrying the road from Canterbury to Ramsgate, the other from Sandwich to Margate. The Ashford–Ramsgate line passes through the junction. It was named after the original manor house at this location, which belonged to the Marquess Conyngham.

In 1966, several Anglo Saxon burial grounds were discovered near the pub following utility works. The remains were re-interred at the Duckworth Laboratory in Cambridge and the associated objects housed in Ramsgate library. Further excavation took place between 1976 and 1981. In 1981, the site was made a scheduled monument.

The junction is now a roundabout between the A299 Thanet Way from London and the A256 from Dover. The two roads share a single dual carriageway to the south of the junction, and then branch off to Ramsgate and Margate respectively. It has become one of the main access points from Thanet towards London. In 2019, the junction was named as one of the 20 most dangerous in Kent.

There have been several proposals to redevelop the pub's grounds as a lorry and car park, and a car wash, all of which were refused permission by the local council. A plan to build a Costa Coffee shop at the junction was refused in 2021.

In September 2020, it was announced that the now unused pub would be demolished and the land reused for office and storage space.
