= A299 road =

Road on the northern coast of Kent

A299

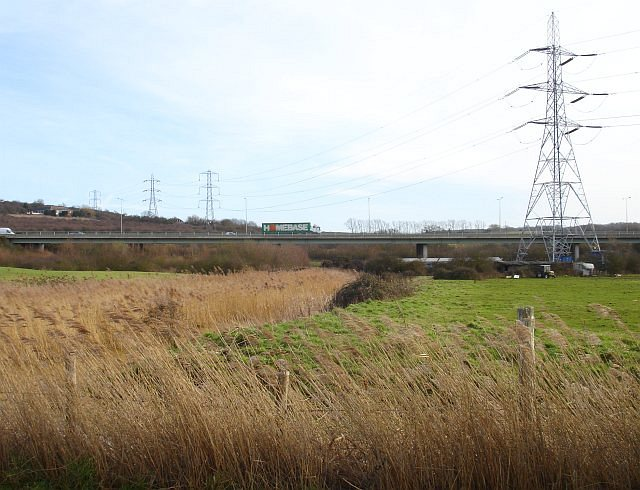

Route information
- Length: 22 mi (35 km)

Major junctions
- West end: Brenley Corner (Near Faversham); 51.2988°N 0.9212°E
- M2; A2 A2990 A290 A291; A28 A253 A256 A255
- East end: Ramsgate; 51.3343°N 1.3902°E

Location
- Country: United Kingdom
- Primary destinations: Margate, Ramsgate

Road network
- Roads in the United Kingdom; Motorways; A and B road zones

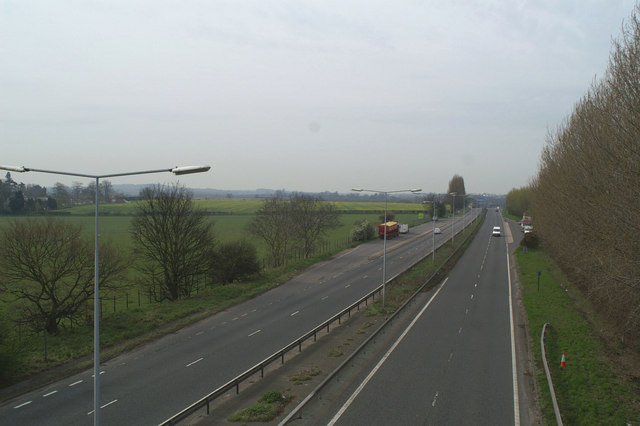
The A299, towards the junction with the A2/M2

The A299, better known as the Thanet Way, is a major road of 22 miles (35 km) in the county of Kent, England, and runs from Brenley Corner near Faversham (where it merges into the M2) to Ramsgate via Whitstable and Herne Bay.

The road provides access for freight traffic to Ramsgate Harbour, Manston Airport and Thanet Earth, as well as local access to Thanet.

== History ==
The A299 number was first allocated to a road from Faversham to Herne Bay, via Graveney, Seasalter and Whitstable. Most of the modern route was constructed in the early 1930s as an unemployment relief project. Prior to this, all traffic from the west to the Isle of Thanet had to go via Canterbury.

The A299 was upgraded between 1989 and 1997 to dual carriageway for almost its entire length. This included bypasses of Whitstable and Herne Bay, with the old road becoming the A2990. The A299 to the west of Whitstable and east of Herne Bay received online upgrades. This work included a twin-cell concrete tunnel below Chestfield golf course.

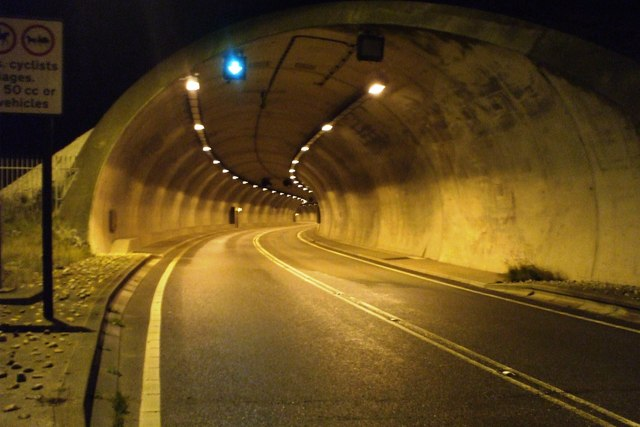
The Ramsgate Tunnel section of the A299

The original Thanet Way project, and hence the A299, used to end near Monkton, where the A253 once continued to Ramsgate. This section of road has been renumbered as an extension of the A299 to Ramsgate Harbour, including a 1-mile tunnel under the Pegwell area constructed in the 1990s.

The section from Minster roundabout to the Lord of the Manor roundabout was diverted on to a new dual carriageway during 2009–12, constructed as part of "East Kent Access" phase 2 to provide better access to Manston Airport and the Pfizer complex at Sandwich. This included a box jacked underpass below the Foads Hill road and railway line at Cliffsend. It was opened by Norman Baker on 23 May 2012.

In 2020, Kent County Council installed mobile CCTV cameras along the A299 in anticipation of HGV backlogs due to Brexit.

== See also ==
- Great Britain road numbering system
