= A256 road =

Road in Kent

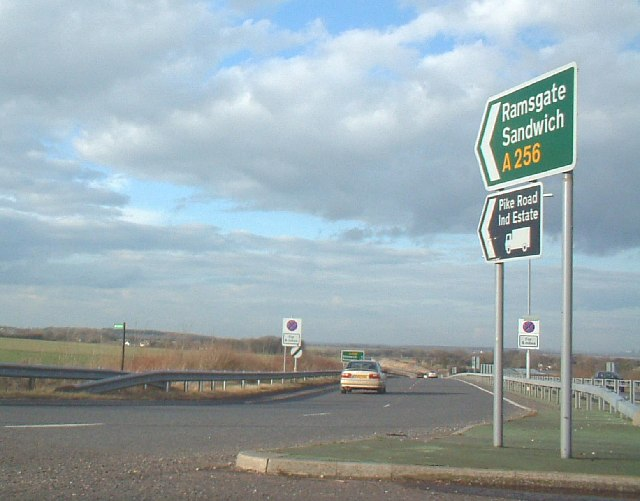

The A256 is a major road running along the east coast of Kent between the Isle of Thanet and Dover. It is operated by Kent County Council as a primary route, and has seen investment in the past to connect traffic to the Port of Ramsgate, and to the Pfizer research centre in Sandwich.

== Route ==
The A256 begins on the edge of Broadstairs with the A255. Within Thanet, it runs through the Westwood retail park, Westwood Cross, and Haine Road. It meets the A299 Thanet Way from Faversham at the Lord of the Manor junction, where it becomes a major road. From here, it heads south towards the former Richborough Power Station, Sandwich and Dover as a high quality road.

== History ==
A Roman road ran from Dover to Woodnesborough, in roughly the same direction as the modern A256, though on a different route. It is not mentioned in the second century Antonine Itinerary, but this may simply have been as it was not an important route. The basic route of the modern road was recognised as a turnpike by the start of the 19th century.

The Sandwich bypass opened in 1981; prior to this, the A256 ran over the Sandwich Toll Bridge and was a major source of local congestion. A further upgrade from Whitfield to Eastry was completed in the 1990s, bypassing those villages and Tilmanstone to the east.

The A256 was outlined as a strategic corridor by Kent County Council in 1999. At a board meeting the following year, two proposals ("East Kent Access" phases 1 and 2) were announced. The first phase, implemented between 2003 and 2005, contained various junction improvements and upgrading single carriageway sections around Sandwich to dual carriageway. Phase 2 was a major upgrade of the approach to Thanet and the largest highway project constructed by the council. It included a new A299 dual carriageway bypassing Cliffsend and a new bridge over the Ashford to Ramsgate line.

In 2015, dual carriageway sections of the A256 were identified as a possible relief for Operation Stack, which would queue Dover-bound freight vehicles along the road.
