= List of acts of the Parliament of Great Britain from 1755 =

This is a complete list of acts of the Parliament of Great Britain for the year 1755.

For acts passed until 1707, see the list of acts of the Parliament of England and the list of acts of the Parliament of Scotland. See also the list of acts of the Parliament of Ireland.

For acts passed from 1801 onwards, see the list of acts of the Parliament of the United Kingdom. For acts of the devolved parliaments and assemblies in the United Kingdom, see the list of acts of the Scottish Parliament, the list of acts of the Northern Ireland Assembly, and the list of acts and measures of Senedd Cymru; see also the list of acts of the Parliament of Northern Ireland.

The number shown after each act's title is its chapter number. Acts are cited using this number, preceded by the year(s) of the reign during which the relevant parliamentary session was held; thus the Union with Ireland Act 1800 is cited as "39 & 40 Geo. 3. c. 67", meaning the 67th act passed during the session that started in the 39th year of the reign of George III and which finished in the 40th year of that reign. Note that the modern convention is to use Arabic numerals in citations (thus "41 Geo. 3" rather than "41 Geo. III"). Acts of the last session of the Parliament of Great Britain and the first session of the Parliament of the United Kingdom are both cited as "41 Geo. 3".

Acts passed by the Parliament of Great Britain did not have a short title; however, some of these acts have subsequently been given a short title by acts of the Parliament of the United Kingdom (such as the Short Titles Act 1896).

Before the Acts of Parliament (Commencement) Act 1793 came into force on 8 April 1793, acts passed by the Parliament of Great Britain were deemed to have come into effect on the first day of the session in which they were passed. Because of this, the years given in the list below may in fact be the year before a particular act was passed.

== 28 Geo. 2 ==
The second session of the 11th Parliament of Great Britain, which met from 14 November 1754 until 25 April 1755.

This session was also traditionally cited as 28 G. 2.

=== Public acts ===
Short title	Citation	Royal assent
Long title
Chelsea Hospital Act 1755 (repealed)	28 Geo. 2. c. 1	19 December 1754
An Act for Relief of the Out Pensioners of the Royal Hospital at Chelsea. (Repealed by Chelsea Hospital Act 1815 (55 Geo. 3. c. 125) and Chelsea Pensions (Abolition of Poundage) Act 1847 (10 & 11 Vict. c. 4))
Taxation Act 1755 (repealed)	28 Geo. 2. c. 2	19 December 1754
An Act for continuing, and granting to His Majesty, certain Duties upon Malt, Mum, Cyder, and Perry, for the Service of the Year One Thousand Seven Hundred and Fifty-five. (Repealed by Statute Law Revision Act 1867 (30 & 31 Vict. c. 59))
Indemnity Act 1755 (repealed)	28 Geo. 2. c. 3	19 December 1754
An Act to indemnify Members of Cities, Corporations, and Borough Towns, who have neglected to take the Oaths of Office, and to stamp their Admissions; and for allowing them further Time for those Purposes. (Repealed by Statute Law Revision Act 1867 (30 & 31 Vict. c. 59))
Mutiny Act 1755 (repealed)	28 Geo. 2. c. 4	19 December 1754
An Act for punishing Mutiny and Desertion, and for the better Payment of the Army and their Quarters. (Repealed by Statute Law Revision Act 1867 (30 & 31 Vict. c. 59))
Land Tax Act 1755 (repealed)	28 Geo. 2. c. 5	19 December 1754
An Act for granting an Aid to His Majesty, by a Land Tax, to be raised in Great Britain, for the Service of the Year One Thousand Seven Hundred and Fifty-five; and for Relief of the Inhabitants of certain Places in the County of Lincoln, in respect of Arrears of the Land Tax. (Repealed by Statute Law Revision Act 1867 (30 & 31 Vict. c. 59))
Mortuaries (Chester) Act 1755	28 Geo. 2. c. 6	20 March 1755
An Act for taking away Mortuaries in the Archdeaconry of Chester; and giving a Recompense therefor to the Bishop of Chester, as Archdeacon of Chester, who holds and enjoys the said Archdeaconry in Right of his See.
Sheriffs (Scotland) Act 1755 (repealed)	28 Geo. 2. c. 7	20 March 1755
An Act concerning the Offices of Sheriff Depute and Stewart Depute, in that Part of Great Britain called Scotland. (Repealed by Sheriff Courts (Scotland) Act 1907 (7 Edw. 7. c. 51))
Sankey Brook Navigation Act 1755 (repealed)	28 Geo. 2. c. 8	20 March 1755
An Act for making navigable the River or Brook called Sankey Brook, and the Three several Branches thereof, from the River Mersey, below Sankey Bridges, up to Boardman's Stone Bridge on the South Branch, to Gerrard's Bridge on the Middle Branch thereof, and to Penny Bridge on the North Branch thereof, all in the County Palatine of Lancaster; and also for adjusting the Measure of Coal to be brought down the said River or Brook, and sold within the Town of Liverpool in the said County. (Repealed by Sankey Brook Navigation Act 1830 (11 Geo. 4 & 1 Will. 4. c. l))
Southwark Market Act 1755	28 Geo. 2. c. 9	20 March 1755
An Act to prevent the holding of any Market for the future in The High Street of the Borough of Southwark, in the County of Surry.
Papists Act 1755 (repealed)	28 Geo. 2. c. 10	20 March 1755
An Act for allowing further Time for Enrolment of Deeds and Wills made by Papists; and for Relief of Protestant Purchasers. (Repealed by Statute Law Revision Act 1867 (30 & 31 Vict. c. 59))
Marine Mutiny Act 1755 (repealed)	28 Geo. 2. c. 11	25 April 1755
An Act for the Regulation of His Majesty's Marine Forces while on Shore. (Repealed by Statute Law Revision Act 1867 (30 & 31 Vict. c. 59))
Game Act 1755 (repealed)	28 Geo. 2. c. 12	25 April 1755
An Act to explain and amend a Clause in an Act made in the Fifth Year of the Reign of Queen Anne, intituled, "An Act for the better Preservation of the Game", (Note: Game Act 1706 (6 Ann. c. 16)) in relation to the selling or offering to Sale any Game. (Repealed by Game Act 1831 (1 & 2 Will. 4. c. 32))
Insolvent Debtors Relief Act 1755 (repealed)	28 Geo. 2. c. 13	25 April 1755
An Act for Relief of Insolvent Debtors. (Repealed by Statute Law Revision Act 1867 (30 & 31 Vict. c. 59))
Herring Fishery Act 1755 (repealed)	28 Geo. 2. c. 14	25 April 1755
An Act for further explaining, amending, and rendering more effectual, an Act made in the Twenty-third Year of the Reign of His present Majesty, intituled, "An Act for the Encouragement of the British White Herring Fishery;" (Note: Herring Fishery Act 1749 (23 Geo. 2. c. 24)) and for giving further Encouragement for the carrying on the said Fishery; and for other Purposes therein mentioned. (Repealed by Statute Law Revision Act 1867 (30 & 31 Vict. c. 59))
National Debt Act 1755 (repealed)	28 Geo. 2. c. 15	25 April 1755
An Act for granting to His Majesty the Sum of One Million, to be raised by a Lottery. (Repealed by Statute Law Revision Act 1870 (33 & 34 Vict. c. 69))
Navigation Act 1755 (repealed)	28 Geo. 2. c. 16	25 April 1755
An Act for the better Supply of Mariners and Seamen, to serve in His Majesty's Ships of War, and on board Merchant Ships, and other Trading Ships and Vessels. (Repealed by Statute Law Revision Act 1867 (30 & 31 Vict. c. 59))
Highways and Turnpike Roads Act 1755 (repealed)	28 Geo. 2. c. 17	25 April 1755
An Act to amend an Act made in the Twenty-sixth Year of the Reign of His present Majesty, intituled, "An Act for the Amendment and Preservation of the publick Highways and Turnpike Roads of this Kingdom; and for the more effectual Execution of the Laws relating thereto." (Note: Highways and Turnpike Roads Act 1753 (26 Geo. 2. c. 30)) (Repealed by Statute Law Revision Act 1867 (30 & 31 Vict. c. 59))
Distemper Amongst Cattle Act 1755 (repealed)	28 Geo. 2. c. 18	25 April 1755
An Act to continue several Laws relating to the Distemper now raging among the Horned Cattle in this Kingdom. (Repealed by Statute Law Revision Act 1867 (30 & 31 Vict. c. 59))
Thefts, Robberies, etc. Act 1755 (repealed)	28 Geo. 2. c. 19	25 April 1755
An Act for making perpetual an Act passed in the Twenty-fifth Year of the Reign of His present Majesty, (Note: Disorderly Houses Act 1751 (25 Geo. 2. c. 36)) for the better preventing Thefts and Robberies, and for regulating Places of publick Entertainment, and punishing Persons keeping disorderly Houses; for the further punishing Persons selling Ale or other Liquors without License; for the preventing the burning or destroying of Goss, Furze, or Fern, in Forests or Chaces; for giving further Time for the Payment of Duties omitted to be paid for the Indentures or Contracts of Clerks and Apprentices, and for the filing Affidavits of the Execution of Contracts of Clerks to Attornies and Solicitors. (Repealed by Statute Law Revision Act 1867 (30 & 31 Vict. c. 59))
Whale Fishery Act 1755 (repealed)	28 Geo. 2. c. 20	25 April 1755
An Act for continuing, explaining, and amending, the several Acts of Parliament made for the further Encouragement of the Whale Fishery carried on by His Majesty's Subjects; and to authorize the Payment of the Bounty to Thomas Hood and others, upon Three Ships fitted out for the said Fishery, and lost in The Greenland Seas. (Repealed by Statute Law Revision Act 1867 (30 & 31 Vict. c. 59))
Importation Act 1755 (repealed)	28 Geo. 2. c. 21	25 April 1755
An Act for making more effectual the Laws prohibiting the Importation of Spirituous Liquors in Casks or Vessels not containing Sixty Gallons; and of Tea above the Quantity of Six Pounds, found on board any British Ship or Vessel not belonging to, or employed by, The East India Company. (Repealed by Customs Law Repeal Act 1825 (6 Geo. 4. c. 105))
Supply, etc. Act 1755 (repealed)	28 Geo. 2. c. 22	25 April 1755
An Act for granting to His Majesty a certain Sum of Money, therein mentioned, out of the Sinking Fund; and applying certain Monies remaining in the Exchequer for the Service of the Year One Thousand Seven Hundred and Fifty-five; and for carrying the Surplus of certain Duties to the Sinking Fund; and for the further appropriating the Supplies granted in this Session of Parliament. (Repealed by Statute Law Revision Act 1867 (30 & 31 Vict. c. 59))
Southwark Market (No. 2) Act 1755 or the Borough Market Act 1756	28 Geo. 2. c. 23	25 April 1755
An Act to enable the Churchwardens, Overseers, and Inhabitants, of the Parish of Saint Saviour, in the Borough of Southwark, in the County of Surry, to hold a Market within the said Parish, not interfering with The High Street in the said Borough.
Indemnity Act 1755 (repealed)	28 Geo. 2. c. 24	25 April 1755
An Act to indemnify Persons who have omitted to qualify themselves for Offices and Promotions within the Time limited by Law; and for allowing further Time for that Purpose. (Repealed by Statute Law Revision Act 1867 (30 & 31 Vict. c. 59))
Making of Indigo Act 1755 (repealed)	28 Geo. 2. c. 25	25 April 1755
An Act for continuing an Act, intituled, "An Act for encouraging the making of Indico in the British Plantations in America." (Note: Importation of Indigo Act 1747 (21 Geo. 2. c. 30)) (Repealed by Statute Law Revision Act 1867 (30 & 31 Vict. c. 59))
Huntingdon Roads Act 1755	28 Geo. 2. c. 26	19 December 1754
An Act for repairing and widening the Road from the High Bridge in the Town of Ramsey, in the County of Huntingdon, through King's Ripton, to the West End of St. Peter's Lane, in the Parish of Saint John, within the Borough of Huntingdon.
Kingston-upon-Hull Improvement Act 1755 (repealed)	28 Geo. 2. c. 27	20 March 1755
An Act for explaining, amending, and making more effectual, several Acts of Parliament, relating to the Maintenance and Employment of the Poor of the Town of Kingston upon Hull; and for better paving, preserving, and cleansing, the Streets, Squares, Lanes, and Alleys, in the said Town, and preventing Obstructions therein; and for preserving the Lamps which shall be set up to enlighten the Streets of the said Town, and securing the Property of such Lamps to the Owners. (Repealed by Hull Poor Relief Act 1824 (5 Geo. 4. c. xiii) and Kingston-upon-Hull Improvement Act 1854 (17 & 18 Vict. c. ci))
Sutton and Reigate Road Act 1755 (repealed)	28 Geo. 2. c. 28	20 March 1755
An Act for repairing and widening the Road from Sutton in the County of Surrey, through the Borough of Reigate, by Sidlow Mill, to Povey Cross; and from Sutton aforesaid, through Cheam and over Howell Hill, to Ewell; and also the Road from Tadworth, by the Windmill, to the Bottom of Pebble Hill in the said County. (Repealed by Sutton (Surrey), Reigate and Povey Cross Road Act 1815 (55 Geo. 3. c. xlviii))
Glasgow Beer Duties Act 1755 (repealed)	28 Geo. 2. c. 29	20 March 1755
An Act for continuing, and rendering more effectual, an Act passed in the Ninth Year of the Reign of His present Majesty, intituled, "An Act for continuing the Duty of Two Pennies Scots, or One Sixth of a Penny Sterling, on every Pint of Ale and Beer that shall be vended or sold within the City of Glasgow; and for extending the same over the Villages of Gorbells and Port Glasgow, and Privileges thereof, for the Benefit of the said City and Villages." (Note: Glasgow Beer Duties Act 1735 (9 Geo. 2. c. 31)) (Repealed by Statute Law Revision Act 1948 (11 & 12 Geo. 6. c. 62))
Stevenage and Biggleswade Road Act 1755 (repealed)	28 Geo. 2. c. 30	20 March 1755
An Act to continue, and render more effectual, Two Acts of Parliament, passed in the Sixth (Note: Stevenage and Biggleswade Road Act 1719 (6 Geo. 1. c. 25)) and Twelfth (Note: Hertfordshire Roads Act 1725 (12 Geo. 1. c. 10)) Years of the Reign of His late Majesty King George, for repairing the Roads from Stevenage in the County of Hertford, to Bigleswade in the County of Bedford; and for repairing the Roads from the North End of the said Roads to the Toll Gate at the North End of the said Town of Bigleswade. (Repealed by Stevenage, Biggleswade and Arsley Road Act 1832 (2 & 3 Will. 4. c. lxxvi))
Monmouth Roads Act 1755 (repealed)	28 Geo. 2. c. 31	20 March 1755
An Act for repairing and widening the several Roads therein mentioned, leading to, through, and from, the Town of Monmouth. (Repealed by Roads to and from Monmouth Act 1818 (58 Geo. 3. c. lxxix) and Monmouth Roads Act 1831 (1 & 2 Will. 4. c. xviii))
Bristol (Nightly Watch) Act 1755 (repealed)	28 Geo. 2. c. 32	20 March 1755
An Act for establishing, maintaining, and well-governing, a Nightly Watch within the City of Bristol. (Repealed by Municipal Corporations Act 1835 (5 & 6 Will. 4. c. 76))
Kimbolton Road Act 1755 (repealed)	28 Geo. 2. c. 33	20 March 1755
An Act for repairing the Road from the North End of Brown's Lane in Great Stoughton in the County of Huntingdon, through Kimbolton and Higham Ferrers, to The Way Post near Wellingborough Bridge in the County of Northampton; and from The Pound in Kimbolton to The Way Post in Great Catworth Field, near Brington Bridge, in the said County of Huntingdon. (Repealed by Great Staughton and Wellingborough and Kimbolton and Brinton Bridge Roads Act 1819 (59 Geo. 3. c. xcix) and Annual Turnpike Acts Continuance Act 1876 (39 & 40 Vict. c. 39))
Wolverhampton Chapel Act 1755	28 Geo. 2. c. 34	20 March 1755
An Act for erecting and building a new Chapel, in the Town of Wolverhampton, in the County of Stafford.
Bury and Stratton Road Act 1755 (repealed)	28 Geo. 2. c. 35	20 March 1755
An Act for repairing the Road from a certain Place in Bury, in the County of Huntingdon, through Warboys, Old Hurst, Saint Ives, Hilton, Eltisley, Waresley, Gamlingay, and Potton, to a House called The Spread Eagle in Stratton, within the several Counties of Huntingdon, Cambridge, and Bedford. (Repealed by Road from Bury (Huntingdonshire) to Stratton near Biggleswade Act 1819 (59 Geo. 3. c. xxv))
Cambridge Roads Act 1755 (repealed)	28 Geo. 2. c. 36	20 March 1755
An Act to continue, and render more effectual, several Acts, for repairing the Road from Stump Cross to Newmarket Heath and the Town of Cambridge; for repairing the Road from Foulmire to Cambridge; and for repairing other ruinous Parts of the Highways adjacent to the Road from Foulmire to Cambridge. (Repealed by Cambridge Roads Act 1790 (30 Geo. 3. c. 94))
Saint Bartholomew the Great Parish, London (Improvement) Act 1755 (repealed)	28 Geo. 2. c. 37	20 March 1755
An Act for the better enlightening and cleansing the open Places, Squares, Streets, Lanes, Alleys, Passages, and Courts, within the Parish of Saint Bartholomew the Great, London; and regulating the Nightly Watch and Beadles within the said Parish. (Repealed by City of London Sewers Act 1851 (14 & 15 Vict. c. xci))
Launceston Poor Relief Act 1755	28 Geo. 2. c. 38	20 March 1755
An Act for the better Relief and Employment of the Poor of the Borough of Dunheved, otherwise Launceston, and Parish of Saint Mary Magdalen, in the County of Cornwall.
Edinburgh Roads Act 1755 (repealed)	28 Geo. 2. c. 39	20 March 1755
An Act for enlarging the Term and Powers granted by an Act of the Twenty-fourth Year of His present Majesty's Reign, intituled, "An Act for repairing the High Roads in the County of Edinburgh, to and from the City of Edinburgh; and from Crammond Bridge to the Town of Queen's Ferry, in the County of Linlithgow;" (Note: Edinburgh and Leith Road Act 1750 (24 Geo. 2. c. 35)) and for making the said Act more effectual. (Repealed by Edinburgh Turnpike Roads Act 1835 (5 & 6 Will. 4. c. lxii))
Market Harborough to Coventry Road Act 1755 (repealed)	28 Geo. 2. c. 40	20 March 1755
An Act for repairing and widening the Road from the Town of Market-Harborough in the County of Leicester, through the Town of Lutterworth in the said County, to the City of Coventry. (Repealed by Road from Market Harborough to Coventry Act 1823 (4 Geo. 4. c. lxi))
Leeds (Lighting, etc.) Act 1755 (repealed)	28 Geo. 2. c. 41	20 March 1755
An Act for enlightening the Streets and Lanes, and regulating the Pavements, in the Town of Leeds, in the County of York. (Repealed by Leeds Improvement Act 1824 (5 Geo. 4. c. cxxiv))
Oxford and Buckinghamshire Roads Act 1755 (repealed)	28 Geo. 2. c. 42	20 March 1755
An Act for enlarging the Term and Powers granted by an Act passed in the Ninth Year of the Reign of His present Majesty, (Note: Berkshire and Oxfordshire Roads Act 1735 (9 Geo. 2. c. 14)) for repairing the Roads leading from Henley Bridge (Note: Henley Bridge in Henley-on-Thames. 51°32′15″N 0°54′01″W) in the County of Oxford, to Dorchester Bridge, (Note: Dorchester Bridge on Henley Road, Dorchester on Thames, Oxfordshire. 51°38′28″N 1°09′49″W) and from thence to Culham Bridge, (Note: Culham Bridge, off the A415 near Culham, Oxfordshire. 51°39′30″N 1°16′38″W) and to a Place called Mile Stone, in the Road leading to Magdalen Bridge, in the said County, and for widening the said Roads; and also for repairing and widening the Roads leading from the End of Culham Bridge next to Culham in the County of Oxford, to the End of Burford Bridge next to Abingdon in the County of Berks; and from The Mayor's Stone at the End of The Boar Street in the Town of Abingdon aforesaid, to Shippon in the said County of Berks, and from thence to the West End of the Town of Fyfield in the same County. (Repealed by Henley-on-Thames, Dorchester and Oxford Roads Act 1821 (1 & 2 Geo. 4. c. xxvi) and Culham, Abingdon and Fyfield Roads Act 1822 (3 Geo. 4. c. xxxvi))
Rotherhithe Ferry Act 1755	28 Geo. 2. c. 43	20 March 1755
An Act for establishing and maintaining a Ferry across the River Thames, between the Hamlet of Ratcliffe in the County of Middlesex, and the Parish of Rotherhithe in the County of Surrey.
Wiltshire Roads Act 1755 (repealed)	28 Geo. 2. c. 44	20 March 1755
An Act for repairing and widening the Road from Basingstoke, through Wortin, Overton, Whitchurch, Hursborn Pryors, Andover, and Middle Wallop, in the County of Southampton, to a Place called Lobcomb Corner in the Parish of Winterslow in the County of Wilts. (Repealed by Basingstoke and Lobcombe Corner Road Act 1821 (1 & 2 Geo. 4. c. xxv))
Sussex and Surrey Roads Act 1755 (repealed)	28 Geo. 2. c. 45	20 March 1755
An Act for widening and repairing the Road leading from Horsham in the County of Sussex, through Capel, Dorking, Mickleham, and Leatherhead, to the Watch-house in Ebbisham in the County of Surry, and from Capel to Stone Street in the Parish of Ockley in the said County of Surry. (Repealed by Road from Horsham to Epsom Act 1823 (4 Geo. 4. c. lxxxvi))
Warwick and Oxford Roads Act 1755 (repealed)	28 Geo. 2. c. 46	20 March 1755
An Act for repairing and widening the Roads leading from the Cross of Hand near Finford Bridge in the County of Warwick, through the Town of Southam in the same County, to the Borough of Banbury in the County of Oxford; and from The Guide Post in the Village of Adderbury in the same County, through Kidlington, to the Mile Way leading towards the City of Oxford; and also the Road leading from a Place called The Two Mile Tree near the City of Oxford, over Gosford otherwise Gossard Bridge, to a certain Gate entering upon Weston on the Green in the said County. (Repealed by Road from Finford Bridge to Banbury Act 1822 (3 Geo. 4. c. xcv))
Gloucester and Warwick Roads Act 1755 (repealed)	28 Geo. 2. c. 47	20 March 1755
An Act for repairing and widening the Road from The Hand and Post at the Top of Burford Lane (Note: The junction of the A429 Fosse Way and the A424 Burford Road. 51°55′05″N 1°43′31″W) in the County of Gloucester to Stow on the Wold, (Note: Stow-on-the-Wold.) and from thence to Halford Bridge (Note: Halford Bridge carries the A429 Fosse Way over the River Stour to the south of Halford, Warwickshire. 52°06′20″N 1°37′22″W) in the County of Warwick, and also the Road from The Cross Hands on Salford Hill (Note: The Cross Hands Inn, on the A44 Salford Hill between Moreton in Marsh and Chipping Norton.) to The Hand and Post in the Parish of Dowdeswell in the County of Gloucester. (Repealed by Burford Lane and Stow-on-the-Wold Roads Act 1824 (5 Geo. 4. c. ix))
Worcestershire Roads Act 1755 (repealed)	28 Geo. 2. c. 48	20 March 1755
An Act for repairing and widening the Roads therein mentioned, lying within the Borough of Droitwich, in the County of Worcester; or leading from the said Borough to the several Places therein mentioned, in the said County. (Repealed by Droitwich Roads Act 1768 (8 Geo. 3. c. 39))
Devon Roads Act 1755 (repealed)	28 Geo. 2. c. 49	25 April 1755
An Act for repairing and widening the Road from Chudleigh Bridge, in the Parish of Hennock in the County of Devon, through the Town and Borough of Ashburton, to Brent Bridge, in the Parish of South Brent in the said County. (Repealed by Newton Bushell, South Bovey and Moretonhampstead Roads Act 1826 (7 Geo. 4. c. xcii))
Yorkshire Roads Act 1755 (repealed)	28 Geo. 2. c. 50	25 April 1755
An Act for amending and widening the Roads from the West End of Toller Lane, near Bradford, through Haworth, in the County of York, to a Place called Blue Bell near Colne in the County of Lancaster, and from a Place called The Two Laws to Kighley in the said County of York. (Repealed by Roads from Toller Lane near Bradford and from the Two Laws Act 1823 (4 Geo. 4. c. xlviii))
Thirsk, Hutton Moor and Masham Road Act 1755 (repealed)	28 Geo. 2. c. 51	20 March 1755
An Act for repairing and widening the Road from Thirsk, over Skipton Bridge, through Baldersby, to Baldersby Gate adjoining to Hutton Moor in the Way to Ripon; and through Ainderby, Quernbow, and Nosterfield, by Well Flashes Gate, to Masham in the County of York; and likewise for removing the Toll House and Turnpike Gates at Busby Stobb in the said County to some other convenient Place in the Road leading from Boroughbridge to the City of Durham. (Repealed by Thirsk and Masham Road Act 1821 (1 & 2 Geo. 4. c. vii))
Litchfield and Chester Roads Act 1755 (repealed)	28 Geo. 2. c. 52	25 April 1755
An Act for amending, altering, continuing, and making more effectual, Two Acts of Parliament, made in the Second (Note: Lichfield Roads Act 1728 (2 Geo. 2. c. 5)) and Seventeenth (Note: Litchfield Roads Act 1743 (17 Geo. 2. c. 24)) Years of His present Majesty's Reign, for repairing the Roads from Coleshill (Note: Coleshill, Warwickshire.) in the County of Warwick, through the City of Litchfield, (Note: Lichfield, Staffordshire.) to Stone (Note: Stone, Staffordshire.) in the County of Stafford, and from thence to the City of Chester, (Note: Chester, Cheshire.) and several other Roads in the said Acts mentioned; and for enlarging the Terms and Powers in the said several Acts. (Repealed by Stafford and Warwick Roads Act 1789 (29 Geo. 3. c. 83))
Rochdale to Burnley Road Act 1755 (repealed)	28 Geo. 2. c. 53	25 April 1755
An Act for repairing and widening the Road from Rochdale to Burnley, in the County of Lancaster. (Repealed by Rochdale and Burnley Road Act 1798 (38 Geo. 3. c. li))
Dean's Yard, Westminster Act 1755 (repealed)	28 Geo. 2. c. 54	25 April 1755
An Act to enable the Reverend William Markham Doctor of Laws, and Thomas Salter Esquire, to build Houses, and open a Square, in and upon a certain Piece of Ground, called Dean's Yard, Westminster, and several Pieces of Ground contiguous thereto. (Repealed by Statute Law (Repeals) Act 1978 (c. 45))
Sandwich Bridge Act 1755	28 Geo. 2. c. 55	25 April 1755
An Act for building a Bridge over the Water, or Haven, between the Town of Sandwich and the opposite Shore in the County of Kent.
Holy Trinity, Guildford Act 1755	28 Geo. 2. c. 56	25 April 1755
An Act to enable the Parishioners of the Parish of The Holy Trinity in Guldeford, in the County of Surry, to sell divers Houses, Lands, Rents, and Annuities, in the said Parish, and in Stoke next Guldeford aforesaid; and to apply the Money arising by Sale thereof towards re-building their Parish Church; and for other Purposes therein mentioned.
Surrey Roads Act 1755 (repealed)	28 Geo. 2. c. 57	25 April 1755
An Act for amending, widening, and keeping in Repair, the Roads from Epsom, through Ewell, to Tooting, and from Ewell to Kingston upon Thames and Thames Ditton, in the County of Surry. (Repealed by Road from Epsom to Tooting Act 1839 (2 & 3 Vict. c. iv))
Lancashire Roads Act 1755 (repealed)	28 Geo. 2. c. 58	25 April 1755
An Act for repairing and widening the Roads from the Town of Manchester, by a Place called The White Smithy, (Note: The White Smithy was located at the junction of the A665 Bury Old Road and the A576 Middleton Road in Crumpsall. 53°30′57″N 2°14′58″W) in the Township of Crumpsal, to the Town of Rochdale, and from the said Place called The White Smithy, by a Place called Besses of the Barn, to the Town of Bury; and from the said Place called Besses of the Barn to Radcliffe Bridge, in the County Palatine of Lancaster. (Repealed by Lancashire Roads Act 1798 (38 Geo. 3. c. xi))
Yorkshire and Lancaster Roads Act 1755 (repealed)	28 Geo. 2. c. 59	25 April 1755
Act for repairing, widening, and amending, the Road from Cocking End near Addingham in the West Riding of the County of York, through Kildwick, to Black Lane End in the County Palatine of Lancaster. (Repealed by Blackburn, Addingham and Cocking End Road Act 1810 (50 Geo. 3. c. xxxvi))
Leeds to Otley Road Act 1755 (repealed)	28 Geo. 2. c. 60	25 April 1755
An Act for repairing and widening the Roads from the Town of Leeds in the West Riding of the County of York, through Otley, Skipton, Colne, Burnley, and Blackburn, to Burscough Bridge in Walton in the County of Lancaster, and from Skipton, through Gisburn and Clitheroe, to Preston in the said County of Lancaster. (Repealed by Skipton and Clitheroe Road Act 1799 (39 Geo. 3. c. lii), Road from Leeds to Otley Act 1821 (1 & 2 Geo. 4. c. xciv), Road from Otley to Skipton Act 1823 (4 Geo. 4. c. xxxi) and Skipton and Colne Road Act 1823 (4 Geo. 4. c. cx))

=== Private acts ===
Short title	Citation	Royal assent
Long title
Great Harborough Inclosure Act 1755	28 Geo. 2. c. 1 Pr.	19 December 1754
An Act for dividing and enclosing the Common Fields, Common Pastures, Common Meadows, and Waste Ground, in the Manor and Parish of Great Harborough, in the County of Warwick.
Naturalization of Arnold Mello, John Swiccard Heinzelman and James Banal.	28 Geo. 2. c. 2 Pr.	19 December 1754
An Act for naturalizing Arnold Mello, John Swiccard Heinzelmann, and James Banal.
British Museum Act 1755	28 Geo. 2. c. 3 Pr.	20 March 1755
An Act for vesting Montagu House (Note: Montagu House, Bloomsbury) in Trustees and their Heirs, freed and discharged from all the Estates, Uses, and Agreements, to which at present it stands limited and appointed, upon Trust, to convey the same to the Trustees of The British Museum, for a general Repository and upon such other Trusts as therein are mentioned.
Earl of Berkeley's Estate Act 1755	28 Geo. 2. c. 4 Pr.	20 March 1755
An Act to empower the Executors of Augustus late Earl of Berkeley to make Leases of his Estates in Gloucestershire, during the Minority of his Children.
Vesting a copyhold messuage or tenement in Middlesex devised by Mary Duchess of Northumberland's will, in trustees for sale and conveyance to Lady Jane Coke, pursuant to an agreement for that purpose and purchase and settling of another estate with proceeds of sale.	28 Geo. 2. c. 5 Pr.	20 March 1755
An Act for vesting a Copyhold Messuage, or Tenement, in the County of Middlesex, with the Appurtenances, devised by the Will of Mary late Dutchess of Northumberland, in Trustees, to enable them to sell and convey the same to the Lady Jane Coke, pursuant to an Agreement for that Purpose; and for laying out the Money arising by such Sale in the Purchase of another Estate, to be settled to the Uses appointed by the said Will.
Confirming and establishing an agreement between the Principal of Magdalen College, Oxford and Ellis St. John for exchanging the advowson of Southmoreton church for the alternative presentation of Finchampstead church (Berkshire).	28 Geo. 2. c. 6 Pr.	20 March 1755
An Act for confirming and establishing an Agreement, between the Principal of Saint Mary Magdalen Hall, in the University of Oxford, and Ellis St. John Clerk, for exchanging the Advowson of the Church of South Moreton, in the County of Berks, for the alternate Presentation of the Church of Finchamstead, in the said County.
Exchange of lands between Christ's Hospital and John Leman.	28 Geo. 2. c. 7 Pr.	20 March 1755
An Act for exchanging of Lands, between the Mayor and Commonalty and Citizens of the City of London, Governors of Christ's Hospital, and John Leman Esquire.
Morice's Estate Act 1755	28 Geo. 2. c. 8 Pr.	20 March 1755
An Act for explaining and making more effectual a Power contained in the Will of Sir William Morice Baronet, for making Leases of his several Estates in the Counties of Devon and Cornwall.
Stradling's Estate Act 1755	28 Geo. 2. c. 9 Pr.	20 March 1755
An Act for Sale of Part of the Estate late of Sir Thomas Stradling Baronet, deceased, in the Counties of Glamorgan and Somerset, for discharging Encumbrances affecting the same; and for a Division and Settlement of other Part thereof; and for other Purposes therein mentioned.
Ibbetson's Estate Act 1755	28 Geo. 2. c. 10 Pr.	20 March 1755
An Act for selling Part of the entailed Estate of Sir Henry Ibbetson Baronet, and vesting other Part thereof in him in Fee Simple; and for laying out the Money arising by such Sale in the Purchase of other Lands, to be settled, together with some other Lands whereof he is seised in Fee, in Lieu of the Lands so to be sold; and for other Purposes therein mentioned.
Confirming and establishing the partition of the estates of Sir George and Frances Chudleigh, Tryphena Davie and John Pollexfen and settling the shares thereof to the same uses as before partition and for authorizing leases of parts of premises.	28 Geo. 2. c. 11 Pr.	20 March 1755
An Act for confirming and establishing the Partition of the Estates late of Sir George Chudleigh and Dame Frances his Wife, Tryphena Davie, and John Pollexfen Esquire; and for settling the several specifick Shares thereof, resulting from the said Partition, to and for the several Uses and Purposes for which the several undivided Parts thereof were vested and settled before the said Partition; and for authorizing Leases to be made of divers Parts of the Premises.
Confirming and establishing the partition of the estates of Stephen and Margaret Nerthleigh, Susannah Yarde, Dame Francis Chudleigh and Tryphena Davie and settling shares and allotments upon and for the benefit of the parties intituled to undivided shares of the estates before partition.	28 Geo. 2. c. 12 Pr.	20 March 1755
An Act for establishing and confirming a Partition of the Estates late of Stephen Northleigh Esquire and Margaret his Wife, Susannah Yarde Widow, Dame Frances Chudleigh, and Tryphena Davie Spinster; and for settling the several specifick Shares and Allotments thereof upon and for the Benefit of the several Parties entitled to the several undivided Shares of the said Estates before the said Partition; and for other Purposes therein mentioned.
Leheup's Estate Act 1755	28 Geo. 2. c. 13 Pr.	20 March 1755
An Act for vesting divers Lands, Tenements, and Hereditaments, in the County of Cambridge, settled on the Marriage of Peter Leheup the Younger Esquire, in Trustees, to be sold and conveyed pursuant to Articles; and for laying out the Purchase-money in another Estate, to be settled to the Uses of his Marriage Settlement.
Hampden's Estate Act 1755	28 Geo. 2. c. 14 Pr.	20 March 1755
An Act for vesting certain Houses and Tenements at Wendover, in the County of Bucks, late the Estate of John Hampden Esquire, in Trustees, to be sold; and for applying the Purchase-money in such Manner as the Residue of his Personal Estate is by his Will directed to be applied.
Stansfield's Estate Act 1755	28 Geo. 2. c. 15 Pr.	20 March 1755
An Act for the Sale of several Estates of Robert Stansfield Esquire, in the County of York; and for laying out the Money arising by such Sale in the Purchase of other Estates, in the said County of York, to be settled to the like Uses.
Mason's Estate Act 1755	28 Geo. 2. c. 16 Pr.	20 March 1755
An Act for Sale of certain Messuages, Lands, and Hereditaments in the County of Worcester, late the Estate of Thomas Mason, deceased, pursuant to an Agreement; and for applying the Money arising thereby, for discharging Encumbrances affecting the same; and for other Purposes therein mentioned.
Spelman's Estate Act 1755	28 Geo. 2. c. 17 Pr.	20 March 1755
An Act for rectifying and supplying several Defects and Omissions in certain Common Recoveries suffered by Edward Spelman Esquire.
Blewitt's Estate Estate Act 1755	28 Geo. 2. c. 18 Pr.	20 March 1755
An Act for rectifying and supplying a Mistake and Omission in a Settlement made of the Estate of Mary Blewitt Widow, on the Marriage of Edmond Blewitt her Eldest Son; and for settling the said Estate on his Issue Male; and for raising Portions for his Younger Brothers.
Kirkham's Estate Act 1755	28 Geo. 2. c. 19 Pr.	20 March 1755
An Act for vesting Part of the settled Estates of Fraunceis Kirkham and Damaris his Wife in Trustees, to be sold, for Payment of Encumbrances affecting the same prior to their Marriage Settlement; and for laying out the Surplus, if any, in the Purchase of other Lands, to be settled to the Uses of the same Settlement.
Brancaster Inclosure Act 1755	28 Geo. 2. c. 20 Pr.	20 March 1755
An Act for dividing and enclosing the Common Field and Brecks, in the Manor and Parish of Brancaster, in the County of Norfolk; and for extinguishing the several Rights of Common and Sheepwalk over the said Field and Brecks, and over certain Half-year Closes and Pieces of Common in the said Manor and Parish; and for granting another Right of Common to the Owners of certain Dwellinghouses in the Manor and Parish aforesaid.
Swanton Morley and Worthing (Norfolk) Inclosure Act 1755	28 Geo. 2. c. 21 Pr.	20 March 1755
An Act for dividing and enclosing the Common Fields, and certain Lands, lying dispersed in the Half-year Closes belonging to the Manor of Swanton with Worthing, within the Parishes of Swanton, Morley, and Worthing, in the County of Norfolk; and for extinguishing the several Rights of Common and Sheep-walk over the said Fields and Half-year Closes, and over certain Lands called The Brecks, lying within the said Manor and Parishes.
Stillingfleet Inclosure Act 1755	28 Geo. 2. c. 22 Pr.	20 March 1755
An Act to confirm and establish an Agreement, for dividing and enclosing several Fields, Meadows, Pastures, Moors, and Greens, in the Lordship of Stillingfleet, in the County of York; and for settling certain Yearly Payments to the Impropriators of the Rectory and to the Vicar of Stillingfleet aforesaid, in Lieu of the Great and Small Tithes belonging to the said Rectory and Vicarage.
Kenilworth Inclosure Act 1755	28 Geo. 2. c. 23 Pr.	20 March 1755
An Act for dividing and enclosing the Common Fields, Common Pastures, Waste Grounds, and Commonable Lands, in the Parish of Kenilworth, in the County of Warwick.
Churchover Inclosure Act 1755	28 Geo. 2. c. 24 Pr.	20 March 1755
An Act for dividing and enclosing the Common Fields, Common Pastures, Common Meadows, Common Grounds, and Waste Ground, in the Manor and Parish of Churchover, in the County of Warwick.
Slingsby Inclosure Act 1755	28 Geo. 2. c. 25 Pr.	20 March 1755
An Act for dividing and enclosing several Open Fields, and Pastures or Commons, in the Township of Slingsby, in the County of York.
Knighton Inclosure Act 1755	28 Geo. 2. c. 26 Pr.	20 March 1755
An Act to confirm and establish an Agreement, for dividing and enclosing several Fields, Meadows, and a Cow Pasture, in Knighton, in the County of Leicester.
Nunburnholme Inclosure Act 1755	28 Geo. 2. c. 27 Pr.	20 March 1755
An Act for dividing and enclosing several Open Fields, and Pastures or Commons, in the Township of Nunburnholme, in the County of York.
Norton by Daventry Inclosure Act 1755	28 Geo. 2. c. 28 Pr.	20 March 1755
An Act for dividing and enclosing the Common Fields, Common Pastures, Common Meadows, Common Grounds, and Waste Grounds, in the Manor and Parish of Norton by Daventry, in the County of Northampton.
Calverly Inclosure Act 1755	28 Geo. 2. c. 29 Pr.	20 March 1755
An Act for dividing and enclosing certain Wastes and Commons, in the Manor of Calverley, in the West Riding of the County of York.
Marsk and Redcar (Yorkshire, North Riding) Inclosure Act 1755	28 Geo. 2. c. 30 Pr.	20 March 1755
An Act for the enclosing, dividing, and exchanging, the Common Fields, Common Meadows, and other Grounds, in the Townships of Marsk and Redcarr, within the Manor of Marsk, in Cleveland, in The North Riding of the County of York; and for providing a certain Recompense to the Vicar of Marsk, in Lieu of his Tithes and the greatest Part of his Glebe.
Freston's Name Act 1755	28 Geo. 2. c. 31 Pr.	20 March 1755
An Act to enable John Freston Esquire, and the Heirs of his Body, to take and use the Surname and Arms of Scrivener.
Killican's Name Act 1755	28 Geo. 2. c. 32 Pr.	20 March 1755
An Act to enable Samuel Blackwell, heretofore called Samuel Killican, and his Heirs, to take and use the Surname of Blackwell only, pursuant to the Will of Jonathan Blackwell, deceased; and to bear the like Arms which were borne by the said Jonathan Blackwell.
Ready's Name Act 1755	28 Geo. 2. c. 33 Pr.	20 March 1755
An Act to enable Alexander Ready Esquire, and his Issue by Sophia his Wife (late Sophia Edwards), to take and use the Surname of Colston, pursuant to the Will of Edward Colston Esquire, deceased, and to bear the like Arms which were borne by the said Edward Colston.
Brinkman's Name Act 1755	28 Geo. 2. c. 34 Pr.	20 March 1755
An Act to enable Theodore Henry Brinckman Esquire to take and use the Surname of Broadhead, pursuant to the Will of Henry Broadhead Esquire, deceased.
Robert's Name Act 1755	28 Geo. 2. c. 35 Pr.	20 March 1755
An Act to enable Wenman Coke, heretofore called Wenman Roberts Esquire, and his Issue Male, to take the Surname of Coke only, pursuant to the Direction of the Will of Sir Edward Coke Baronet, deceased; and that the said Wenman Coke and his Issue Male may bear the Arms of the said Sir Edward Coke.
Lowndes' Name Act 1755	28 Geo. 2. c. 36 Pr.	20 March 1755
An Act to enable William Lowndes Stone Esquire, lately called William Lowndes the Younger Esquire, and Catharine his Wife, and others therein named, to take and use the Surname and bear the Arms of Stone, pursuant to the Will of Francis Lowe Esquire, deceased.
Soulsby's Name Act 1755	28 Geo. 2. c. 37 Pr.	20 March 1755
An Act to enable Christopher Soulsby Esquire, now called Christopher Reed, and his Heirs, to take and use the Surname and Arms of Reed.
Grimston's Name Act 1755	28 Geo. 2. c. 38 Pr.	20 March 1755
An Act to enable the Honourable Harbottle Grimston Esquire, and the Heirs of his Body, to take and use the Surname of Luckyn, pursuant to the Wills of Sir Harbottle Luckyn Baronet and Edward Luckyn Esquire, deceased.
Naturalization of Otto Edward Setler, Albert Mahlstede and John Heinzelmann.	28 Geo. 2. c. 39 Pr.	20 March 1755
An Act for naturalizing Otto Ewald Setler, Albert Mahlstede, and John Conrad Heinzelmann.
Nussen's Naturalization Act 1755	28 Geo. 2. c. 40 Pr.	20 March 1755
An Act for naturalizing Frederick Nussen.
Enabling his Majesty to grant the reversion of lands and hereditaments in Yorkshire in trust for Richard Crowle, in exchange for houses and lands near the King's palace of Windsor and for other considerations to be paid for the same.	28 Geo. 2. c. 41 Pr.	25 April 1755
An Act to enable His Majesty to grant the Reversion of divers Lands and Hereditaments, in the County of York, in Trust, for Richard Crowle Esquire, in Exchange for Houses and Lands near His Majesty's Palace of Windsor, and for other Consideration to be paid for the same.
Establishing an exchange of lands and tithes in Myton (Yorkshire) for other lands and hereditaments in Yorkshire, pursuant to an agreement between the Archbishop of York, the Bishop of Norwich, Henry Herd the vicar of the parish church and Sir Bryan Staplyton, Lord of the manor of Myton.	28 Geo. 2. c. 42 Pr.	25 April 1755
An Act for establishing an Exchange of divers Lands and Tithes in Myton, in the County of York, for other Lands and Hereditaments, in the said County, pursuant to an Agreement between the Lord Archbishop of York as Appropriator, the Bishop of Norwich Lessee of the Rectory, and Henry Herd Clerk Vicar of the Parish Church, and Sir Bryan Stapylton Lord of the Manor, of Myton aforesaid.
Confirming and establishing lands in Little Leake (Nottinghamshire), pursuant to an agreement between Francis Lord Middleton and Robert Bird.	28 Geo. 2. c. 43 Pr.	25 April 1755
An Act for confirming and establishing an Exchange of divers Lands in Little Leake, in the County of Nottingham, pursuant to an Agreement between Francis Lord Middleton and Robert Bird Esquire; and for other Purposes therein mentioned.
Colt's Estate Act 1755	28 Geo. 2. c. 44 Pr.	25 April 1755
An Act for vesting the settled Estate of Sir John Dutton Colt Baronet in Trustees, to be sold, for discharging several Encumbrances affecting the same; and for laying out the Surplus of the Money arising by such Sale in the Purchase of other Lands, to be settled to the same Uses.
Empowering Edward Walter and other persons claiming under the wills of his grandfather and brother, to make leases of lands purchased and to be purchased in the future.	28 Geo. 2. c. 45 Pr.	25 April 1755
An Act to empower Edward Walter Esquire, and divers other Persons claiming under the Wills of his Grandfather and Brother respectively, to make Leases of the several Lands and Hereditaments purchased, and to be purchased, since the Will of Peter Walter the Grandfather, and in Pursuance of the same.
Bramston's Estate Act 1755	28 Geo. 2. c. 46 Pr.	25 April 1755
An Act for vesting the settled Estate of Edmund Bramston Esquire and Henrietta Maria his Wife in Trustees, for raising several Sums of Money, for discharging Portions charged upon the same; and for other Purposes therein mentioned.
Clerke's Estate Act 1755	28 Geo. 2. c. 47 Pr.	25 April 1755
An Act for vesting the Manor of North Weston, and divers Lands and Hereditaments, in the County of Oxford, the Estate of Francis Clerke Esquire, in Trustees, in Trust to sell the same, to raise Money for Payment of Debts and Encumbrances affecting the same; and for other Purposes therein mentioned.
Caldicot's Estate Act 1755	28 Geo. 2. c. 48 Pr.	25 April 1755
An Act for charging the settled and unsettled Estates of Gilbert Caldecot Esquire with raising Money to pay his Debts and Encumbrances; and for limiting his unsettled Estate so charged to the Uses of his Marriage Settlement.
Morgan's Divorce Act 1755	28 Geo. 2. c. 49 Pr.	25 April 1755
An Act for dissolving the Marriage of Richard Morgan Esquire with Ann Hall his now Wife; and to enable him to marry again; and for other Purposes therein mentioned.
Osmotherley Moor Inclosure Act 1755	28 Geo. 2. c. 50 Pr.	25 April 1755
An Act for confirming and establishing an Agreement, for enclosing Osmotherley Moor, or Common, in the County of York; and for rendering the said Agreement more effectual for the Purposes thereby intended.
Breaston Inclosure Act 1755	28 Geo. 2. c. 51 Pr.	25 April 1755
An Act for dividing and enclosing Breaston Cow Pasture, in the County of Derby.
Hawling Inclosure Act 1755	28 Geo. 2. c. 52 Pr.	25 April 1755
An Act for dividing and enclosing the Open and Common Fields, within the Manor and Parish of Hawling, in the County of Gloucester.
Naturalization of Peter, Adriana, Elizabeth, Maria and Gertruda Fremeaux (infants).	28 Geo. 2. c. 53 Pr.	25 April 1755
An Act for naturalizing Peter John Fremeaux, Adriana Constantia Fremeaux, Elizabeth Fremeaux, Maria Catherina Fremeaux, and Gertruda Johanna Fremeaux, who are all Infants under the Age of Eighteen Years.
Kirkman's Naturalization Act 1755	28 Geo. 2. c. 54 Pr.	25 April 1755
An Act for naturalizing Jacob Kirkman.
Passavan's Naturalization Act 1755	28 Geo. 2. c. 55 Pr.	25 April 1755
An Act for naturalizing John Ulric Passavant.

=== Sources ===
- Pickering, Danby, ed. (1766). The Statutes at Large. Vol. 21: From the 26th to the 30th Year of King George II. Cambridge: Joseph Bentham. pp. 217–317 – via Internet Archive.
- Pickering, Danby, ed. (1766). The Statutes at Large. Vol. 21: From the 26th to the 30th Year of King George II. Cambridge: Joseph Bentham. pp. 217–317 – via Google Books.
- Pickering, Danby, ed. (1766). The Statutes at Large. Vol. 21: From the 26th to the 30th Year of King George II. Cambridge: Joseph Bentham – via Internet Archive.
- Journals of the House of Commons. Vol. 27. London: His Majesty's Stationery Office. 1803. pp. 13–296.
- Chronological Table of and Index to the Statutes. Vol. 1: To the End of the Session 59 Vict. Sess. 2 (1895) (13th ed.). London: Her Majesty's Stationery Office. 1896. p. 116 – via Google Books.

== See also ==
- List of acts of the Parliament of Great Britain
