= Sandwich Toll Bridge =

Coordinates: 51°16′33″N 1°20′32″E

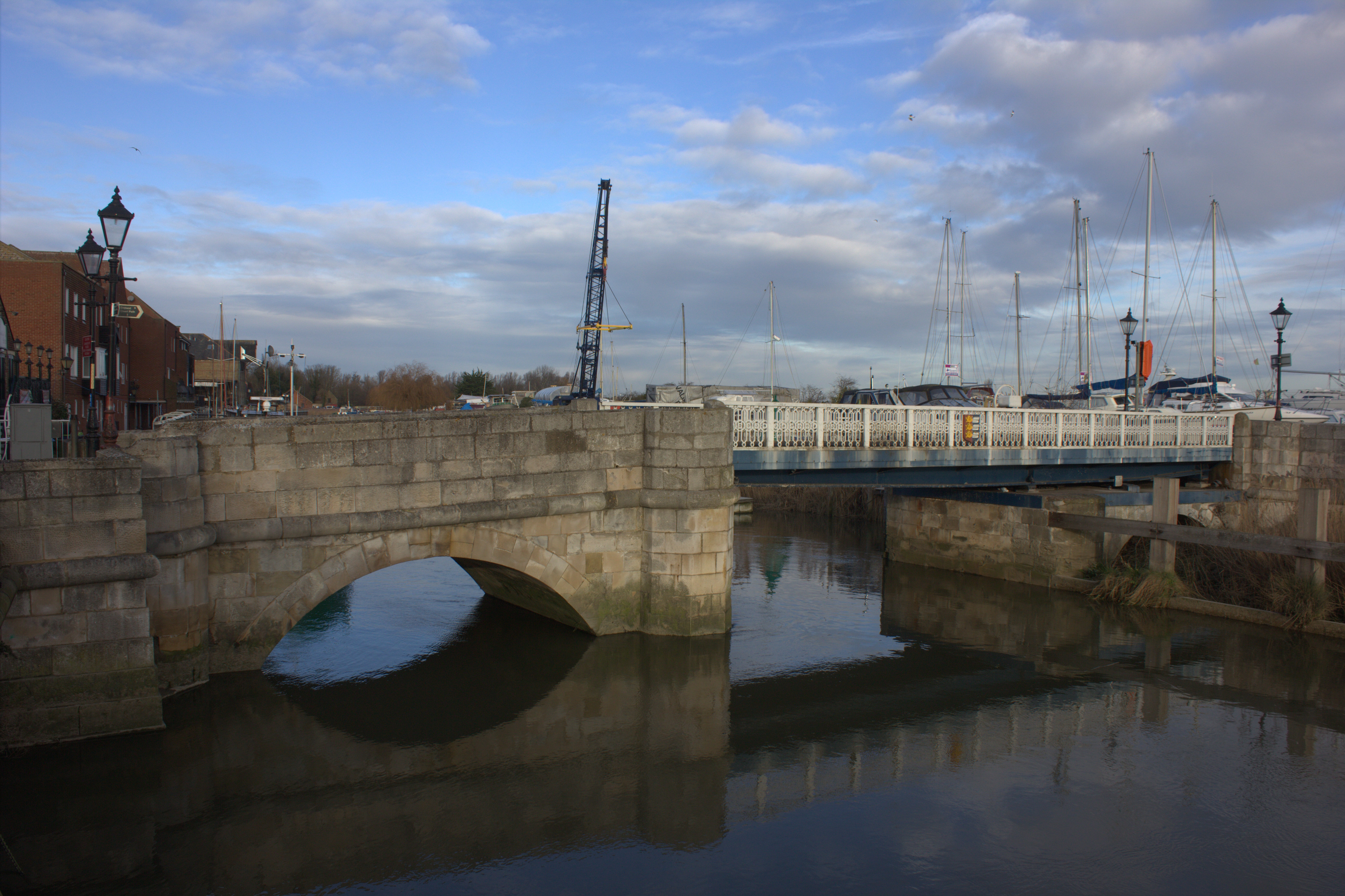
View from the east in 2019

Sandwich Toll Bridge is a Grade II listed road swing bridge over the River Stour in Sandwich, Kent. It opened in 1755 on a site that had been a crossing for centuries, and has had several iterations; the current is a swing bridge that opened in 1892. Tolls were abolished in 1977.

The bridge has been part of the A256 road, a major route across east Kent. This became a significant traffic bottleneck, until a bypass opened in 1981.

== History ==
=== Early history ===
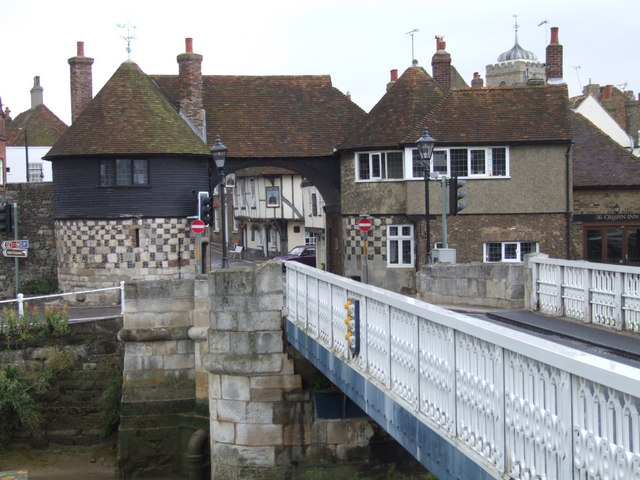
View of the toll gate towards the town

A plaque on the bridge indicates there has been a tolled crossing, originally a ferry, in this rough location since 1127. The crossing forms part of a former turnpike road from Sandwich to the Isle of Thanet that has existed since the late 14th century. A customs house was built at the southern edge of the crossing during Edward IV's reign. The ferry route was frequently dangerous and difficult, and the Mayor of Sandwich petitioned Parliament to have a permanent bridge installed.

Sandwich Bridge Act 1755
- Act of Parliament
- Parliament of Great Britain
- Long title: An Act for building a Bridge over the Water, or Haven, between the Town of Sandwich and the opposite Shore in the County of Kent.
- Citation: 28 Geo. 2. c. 55

Dates
- Royal assent: 25 April 1755

The original bridge was authorised by the Sandwich Bridge Act 1755 and opened that year. The total cost was £1,000, of which £600 was publicly funded with the remainder coming from the Corporation of Sandwich. It was rebuilt in 1773 from Portland stone with a timber raised platform. A table of tolls is displayed on the side of the adjacent Barbican Gate to the south. A new wooden bridge was constructed in 1856, followed by a three-arch iron swing bridge in 1892, to allow river traffic to pass through. The reconstruction supported stone arches at the north and south ends. The bridge supports the town's coat of arms on its side.

=== Modern history ===
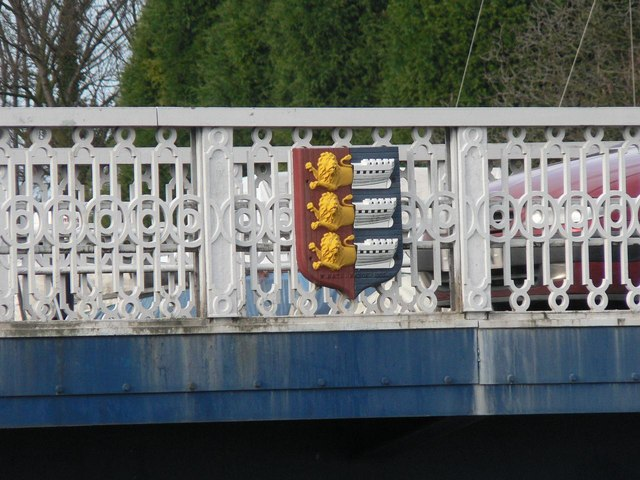
The bridge holds a crest of the town's coat of arms

The bridge formed part of the original route of the A256, a major road along the East Kent coast from Dover to Thanet. In 1962, the toll was 1 shilling (5p) for cars and 1/3 (6¼p) - 1/6 (7½p) for goods vehicles. By 1965, it had become a significant bottleneck on the A256 as it could only carry a single lane of motor traffic and was the only crossing of the Stour in the local area. A petition for a bypass was signed by 3,000 residents. In 1973, a fund was set up to use excess monies from tolls to pay for local infrastructure.

The bridge was Grade II listed in 1976. Tolls were abolished the following year, with the final one being collected by the Mayor Councillor on 30 September. A bypass of Sandwich opened in 1981, taking traffic away from the bridge, yet it continued to attract congestion as it was used as a rat run.

In 2018, the bridge began to suffer reliability problems. While Kent County Council were investigating repairs, on 9 June 2019, the bridge was stuck open after shipping vessel passed through. Following emergency work, it reopened on 24 June. The bridge was expected to close again in February 2020 to all traffic, including pedestrians, but this was postponed. The repairs eventually began in September 2020, closing the bridge for 11 weeks, costing the council half a million pounds. Further maintenance, installing a bespoke gearbox on the bridge, continued the following year.
