= Folkestone railway station =

Folkestone railway station may refer to the following stations in Folkestone, England

- Folkestone Central railway station - one of the two main railway stations in the town
- Folkestone East railway station - the first railway station in the town, closed in 1965
- Folkestone Harbour railway station - the closest railway station to the port, closed to regular traffic in 2001
- Folkestone West railway station - the other main railway station
- Eurotunnel Folkestone Terminal - the British terminal for the road vehicle shuttle services through the Channel Tunnel

See also

- Template:Folkestone railway stations
