= FKW =

FKW may refer to:

- Folkestone West railway station (National Rail station code), a railway station in Kent, England
- Kassel-Wilhelmshöhe station (DS100 code), a railway station in Hesse, Germany
