= South Eastern Main Line diagram =

The South Eastern Main Line is a major trunk railway in the south east of England, linking London with Dover. This is a detailed diagram of the line.

== Sources ==
- Hurst, Geoffrey (1988). Miles and Chains. Vol. 5 Southern (Second ed.). Milton Keynes: Milepost Publications. pp. 38–39. ISBN 0-947796-08-8.
