= Shakespeare Tunnel =

Railway tunnel near Dover, Kent, England

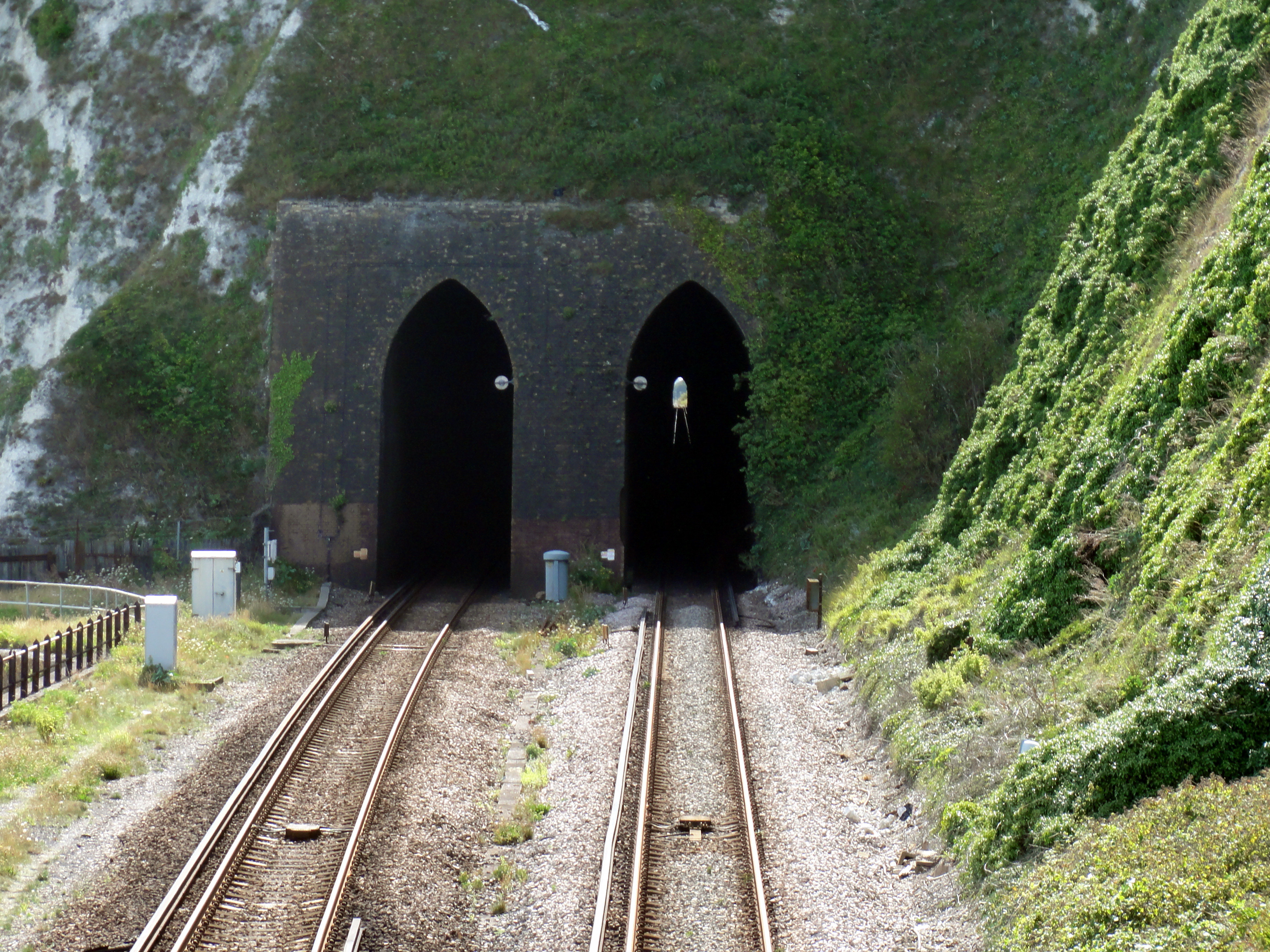
- Shakespeare Tunnel's eastern portal
- Interactive map of Shakespeare Tunnel

Overview
- Line: South Eastern Main Line
- Coordinates: 51°06′44.6″N 1°17′46.2″E
- OS grid reference: TR308399
- Status: Open

Operation
- Opened: 1844

Technical
- Design engineer: William Cubitt
- Length: 0.69 miles (1.11 km)
- No. of tracks: 2

Shakespeare Tunnel is a railway tunnel carrying the South Eastern Main Line between Folkestone and Dover in Kent, UK. Completed in 1884, it was bored beneath the chalk Shakespeare Cliff along the south eastern coastline of England and allows services into and out of Dover Priory railway station.

Shakespeare Tunnel was designed by William Cubitt during the construction of the South Eastern Main Line from London in 1844 in a gothic style. Significant works were completed in 2009 to allow high speed Class 395 trains to operate services through the tunnel, connecting Dover to London via High Speed 1.
