= FKC =

FKC may refer to:

- Fehérvár KC, a Hungarian handball team
- Fellow of King's College
- Folkestone Central railway station, in England
- Fuze Keeping Clock, a fire control computer
