= Shakespeare Cliff Halt railway station =

Former railway station in England

Coordinates: 51°6′27″N 1°16′42″E

Shakespeare Cliff Halt
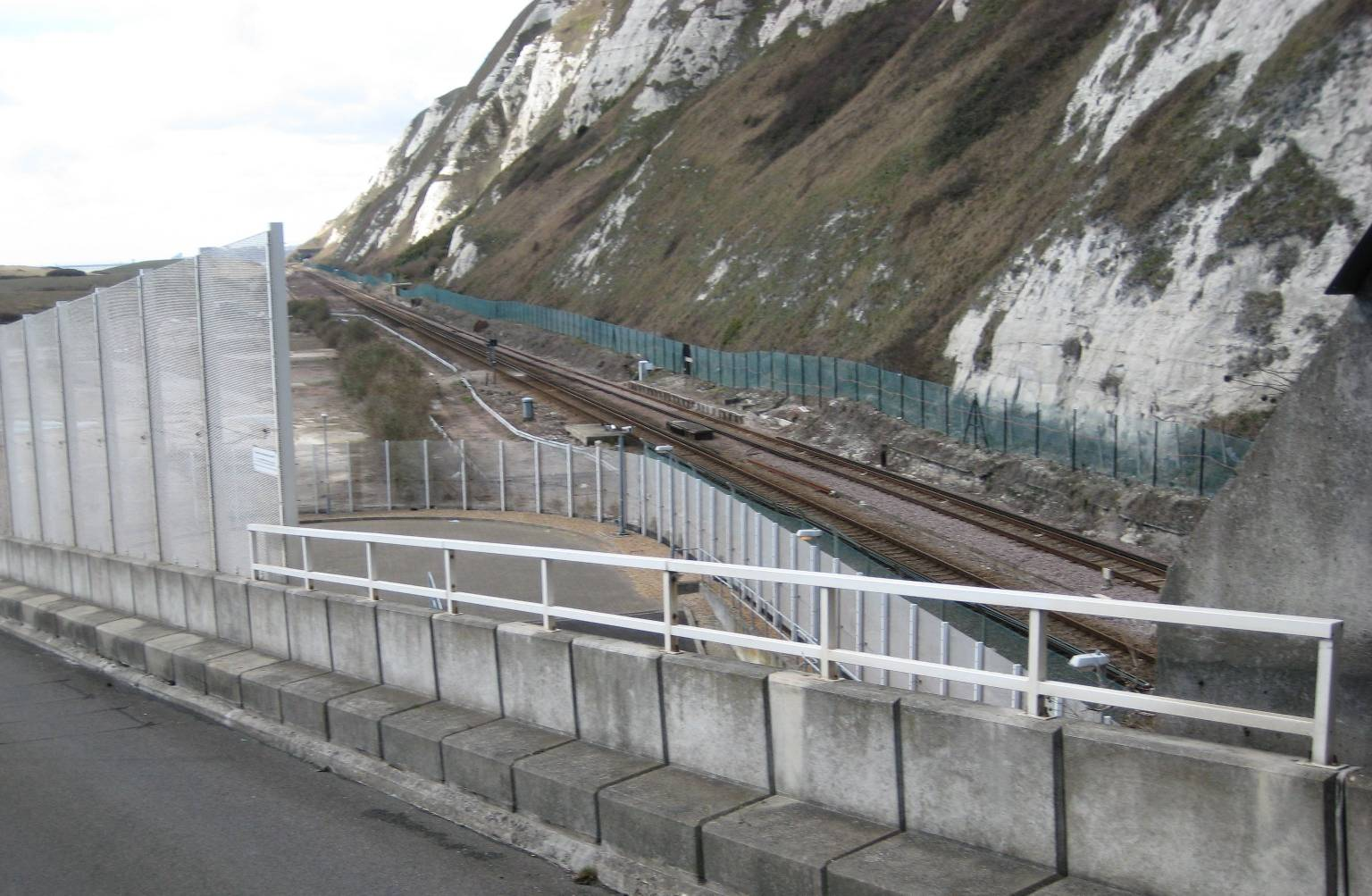
- Railway in 2010

General information
- Location: Farthingloe near Dover, District of Dover; England
- Grid reference: TR296393
- Platforms: 2

Other information
- Status: Disused

History
- Original company: South Eastern Railway
- Pre-grouping: South Eastern and Chatham Railway
- Post-grouping: Southern Railway

Key dates
- 2 June 1913: Opened
- circa 1994?: last used
Location

Shakespeare Cliff Halt is a private halt station on the South Eastern Main Line. It is located to the western end of the dual-bore Shakespeare Cliff tunnel on the South Eastern Main Line to Folkestone, England. It never appeared in any public timetable and has been used successively by railway staff, coal miners, the military and Channel Tunnel workers.

== History ==
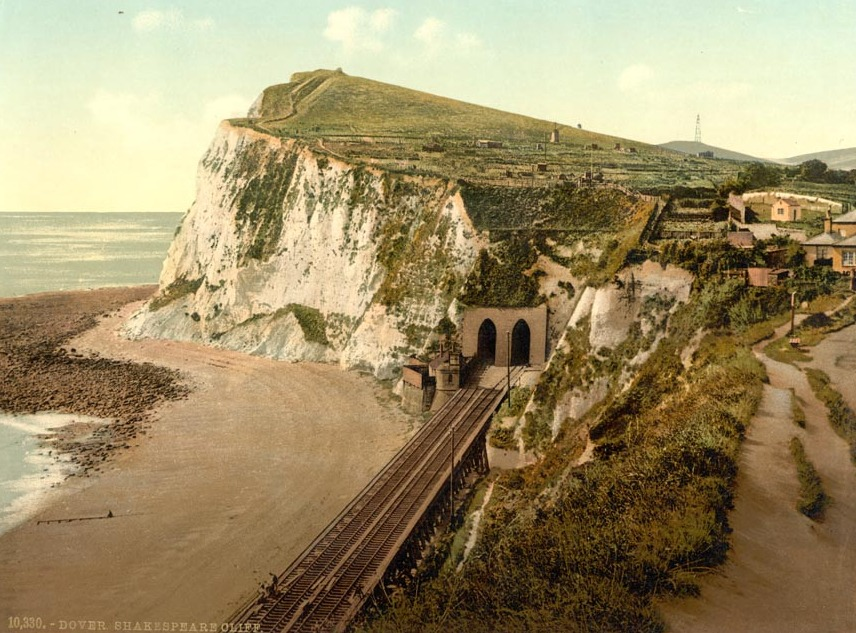
Shakespeare Cliff, Dover, photochrome print

Shakespeare Cliff near Dover was the location of the first attempt to construct a tunnel under the English Channel in the late 1870s, when a 7-foot (2.13 m) diameter Beaumont-English boring machine dug a 1,893-metre (6,211 ft) pilot tunnel from the location. The project was abandoned in May 1882, owing to British political and press campaigns claiming that a tunnel would compromise Britain's national defences. A further shaft was made in 1890 and coal was struck about 1,100 feet (340 m) below the surface; Shakespeare Colliery was opened on the site in 1896 and was producing 8 long tons (8.1 t) of coal per day by 1907.

In 1913, the South Eastern and Chatham Railway opened a halt primarily for the use of miners at Dover Colliery, who worked the mine until its closure in 1915. At least from 1920, the station was used by the Admiralty, as well as by railway staff who lived nearby in railway cottages; the halt was convenient for Shakespeare signal box and siding. The station was never advertised in any public timetable because members of the public alighting there would find themselves on an isolated wedge of flat land carved into the chalk cliff face.

For some years a watchman was based at the station and a zig-zag path was provided to give access from the top of the cliff. The British Army used the station during the Second World War to serve a nearby military camp, and medical staff are also recorded as having used the halt in the post-war period. Shakespeare Cliff Halt was given a new lease of life when work began again on the abortive Channel Tunnel of that time. Workmen carrying out preliminary work used the halt between November 1973 and January 1974, and it was used again in the early 1990s during the actual construction of the Channel Tunnel. At that time, the up platform was rebuilt and lengthened, and a substantial timber footbridge was built across the rail tracks, with offices on the bridge. Special season tickets were issued by British Rail for people involved in constructing the Tunnel. The last use of the halt was by those constructing Samphire Hoe Country Park on the site of the Tunnel workings.

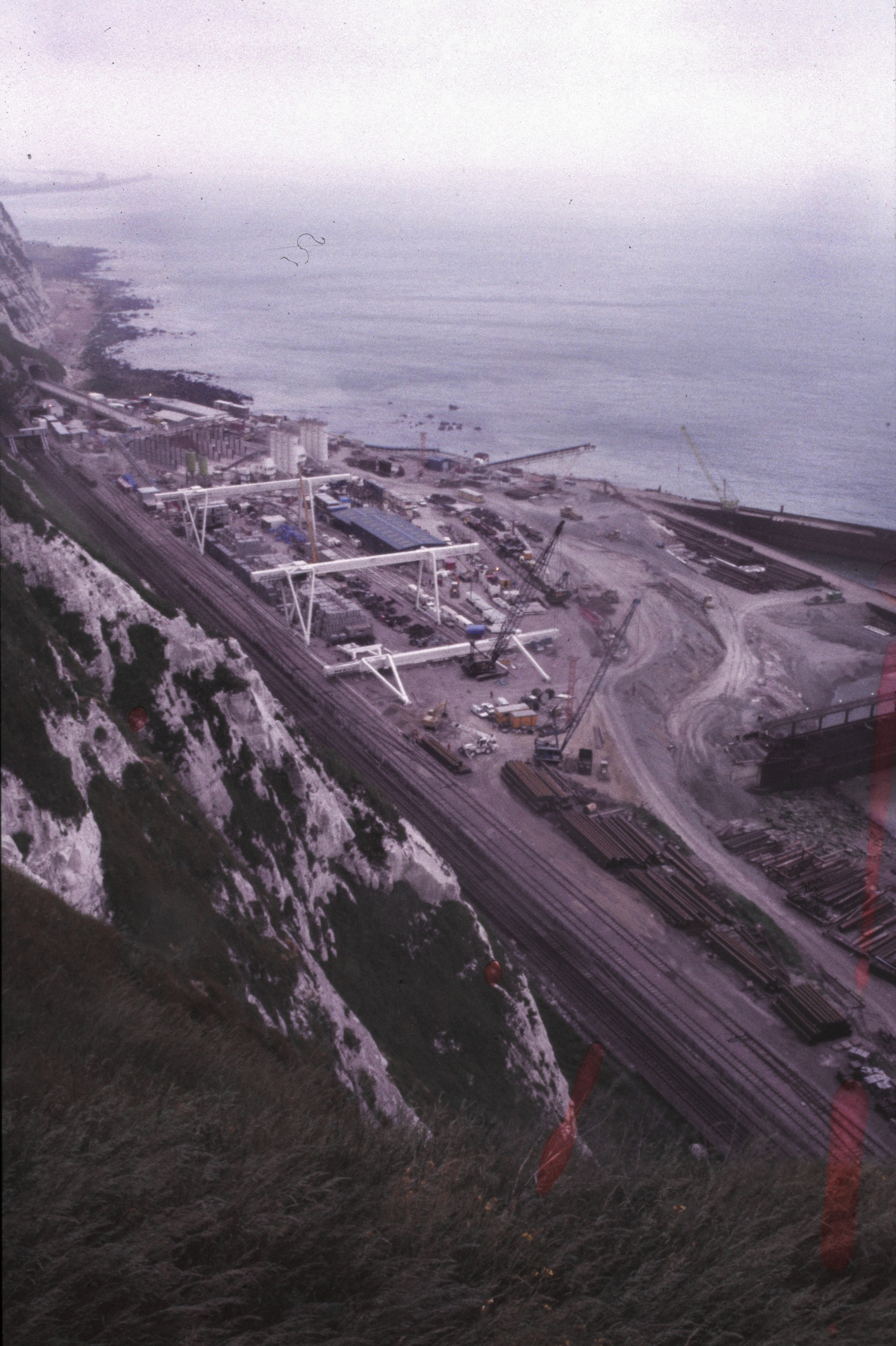
Shakespeare Cliff halt (top left) seen during construction of Channel Tunnel 25/6/88 from the South East Coast Path.

== Present day ==
The halt has fallen into disuse since completion of the Channel Tunnel in 1994. The timber shelter provided for users is barely standing, and the nameboard has gone, although its concrete supports remain.

Preceding station	Disused railways	Following station
Folkestone Warren Halt Line open, station closed	British Rail Southern Region South Eastern Main Line	Dover Harbour Line open, station closed
Folkestone Warren Halt Line open, station closed	British Rail Southern Region South Eastern Main Line	Dover Marine Line and station closed

== See also ==
- Samphire Hoe Country Park - the carpark is to the seaward side of the station site
