= Folkestone Warren Halt railway station =

Former railway station in England

Coordinates: 51.0962°N 1.2107°E

Folkestone Warren Halt
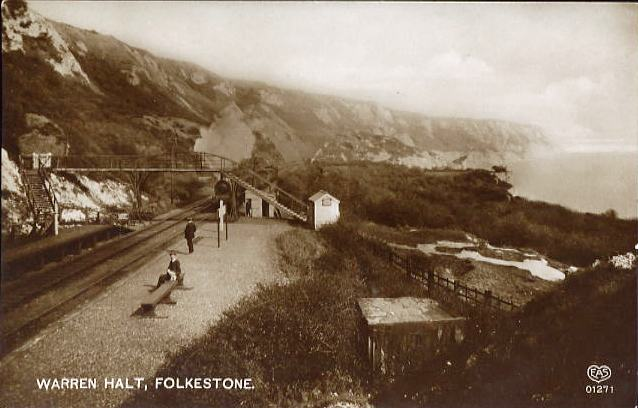

General information
- Location: East Folkestone, Folkestone & Hythe; England
- Grid reference: TR249379
- Platforms: 2

Other information
- Status: Disused

History
- Pre-grouping: SER; SE&CR
- Post-grouping: Southern Railway; Southern Region of British Railways

Key dates
- 1 July 1886: Opened
- 1886: Closed
- 1 June 1908: Reopened
- 19 December 1915: Closed
- 11 August 1919: Reopened
- 25 September 1939: Closed to the public
- 1971: Closed
Location

Folkestone Warren Halt was a station on the South Eastern Main Line of the South Eastern Railway at the beach location known as "The Warren" in the east end of Folkestone, Kent, now within the East Cliff and Warren Country Park.

== 1886 opening ==
The station was first opened by the South Eastern Railway in 1886 which installed a bridge over the Main Line leading to a gate on to The Warren from which the public could picnic and enjoy the dramatic scenery in the area; a zig-zag path led down the East Cliff to the station. The Halt enjoyed, however, a brief existence, closing after the Summer in the face of threats by Lord Radnor who felt that his land was being trespassed upon. There is also a suggestion that the station had not been formally authorised by the Board of Trade which, upon discovering its existence, refused to grant consent.

== 1908 reopening ==
Warren Halt was reopened 22 years later by the South Eastern and Chatham Railway and remained open until the evening of 19 December 1915 when a large landslip resulted in the entire undercliff supporting the Main Line moving towards the sea causing approximately 1.5 million cubic metres of chalk to slip or fall burying Warren Halt. The railway watchman was able to stop the 6.10pm Ashford to Dover service as it emerged from Martello Tunnel, hauled by D class, no. 493.

The station as well as the affected section of the South Eastern Main Line remained closed until 1919. The Warren was a popular picnic spot in Edwardian times and a nearby tea chalet served hundreds of visitors daily.

In 1923 the Halt was rebuilt by the Southern Railway which added a set of platforms. The station remained open for a further 16 years before another landslip in 1939. The Halt was, however, kept open as a staff facility until 1971 and a nearby siding subsequently served early Channel Tunnel works.

Preceding station	Disused railways	Following station
Folkestone East Line open, station closed	British Rail Southern Region South Eastern Main Line	Shakespeare Cliff Halt Line open, station closed
