= Folkestone Harbour railway station =

Railway station in England

Coordinates: 51.0781°N 1.1874°E

Folkestone Harbour
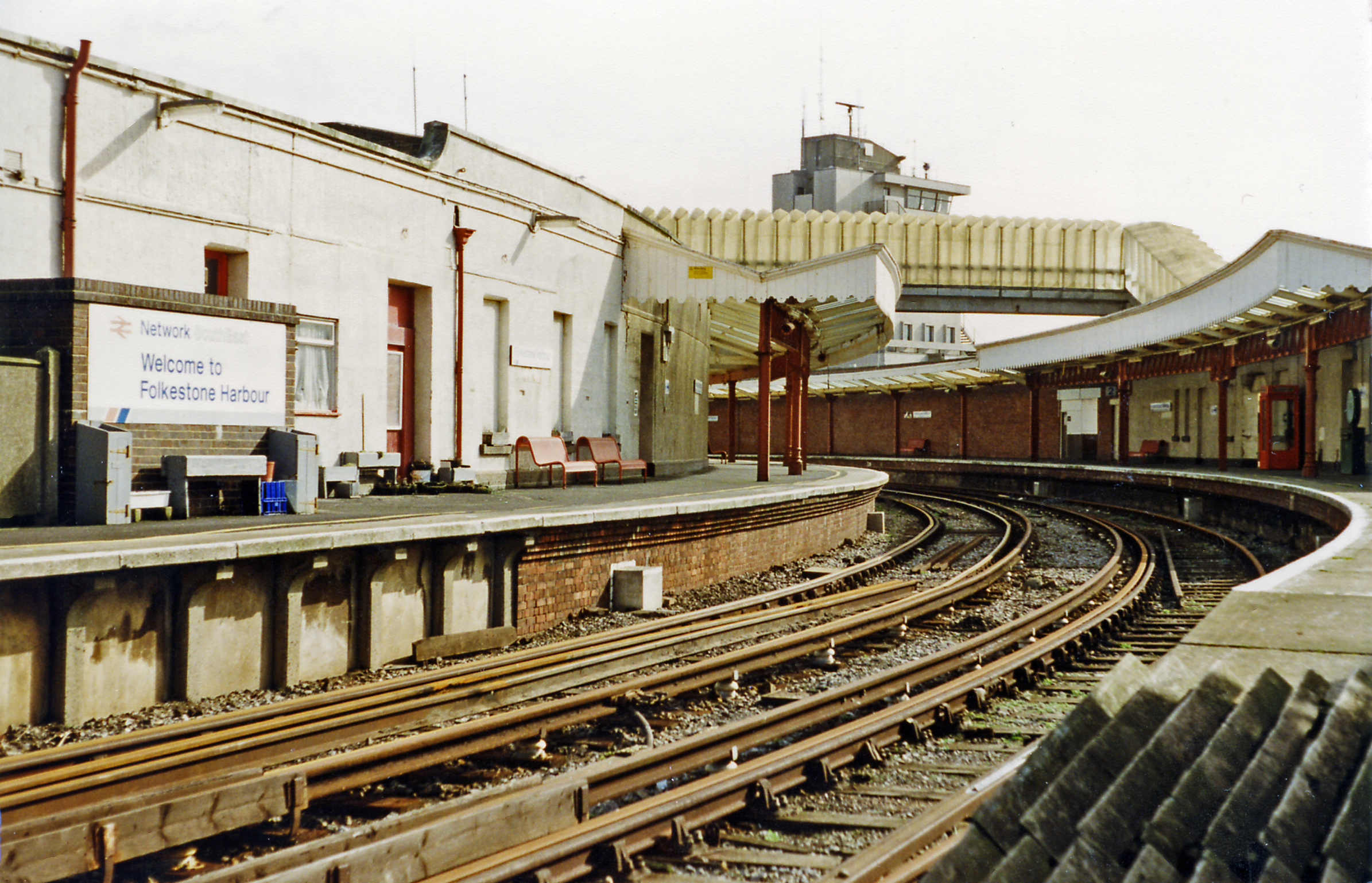
- Tracks running into the station

General information
- Location: Folkestone, Kent; England
- Platforms: 2 (latterly 1)

Other information
- Status: Disused

History
- Opened: 1 January 1849
- Closed: 31 May 2014
- Original company: South Eastern Railway
- Pre-grouping: South Eastern and Chatham Railway
- Post-grouping: Southern Railway

Key dates
- 1 January 1849: First station opened
- 1856: Station resited
- 12 July 1904: Station rebuilt
- 2001: Closed to regular traffic
- 14 March 2009: Closed to all traffic
- 31 May 2014: Line officially closed
Location

A 1914 Railway Clearing House map of the Folkestone Harbour Branch

Folkestone Harbour station was one of four railway stations in Folkestone, Kent. It served Folkestone Harbour with connecting boat train services across the English Channel to Calais and Boulogne.

The station was opened by the South Eastern Railway (SER) in 1849 as part of a project to redevelop the harbour and connect it to the wider railway network. The local geography prevented direct access from the South Eastern Main Line, so a 1-mile (1.6 km) 1-in-32 branch line was built from Folkestone Junction, which crossed the harbour on a viaduct, reaching the station at the pier. Originally designed for freight, the line also became popular with continental passenger services. The station was redeveloped in the early 20th century and it was an important destination for soldiers during World War I.

The opening of the Channel Tunnel in 1994 made Folkestone Harbour uncompetitive, and the station began to decline, with regular passenger services ending in 2001. After this, the line saw occasional steam rail tours and Venice-Simplon Orient Express (VSOE) trains, with the final service running in 2009 and it was formally closed in 2014. After closure the track was removed but the station has been restored and redeveloped into a market and restaurants along with the rest of the harbour complex.

== History ==
=== 19th century ===
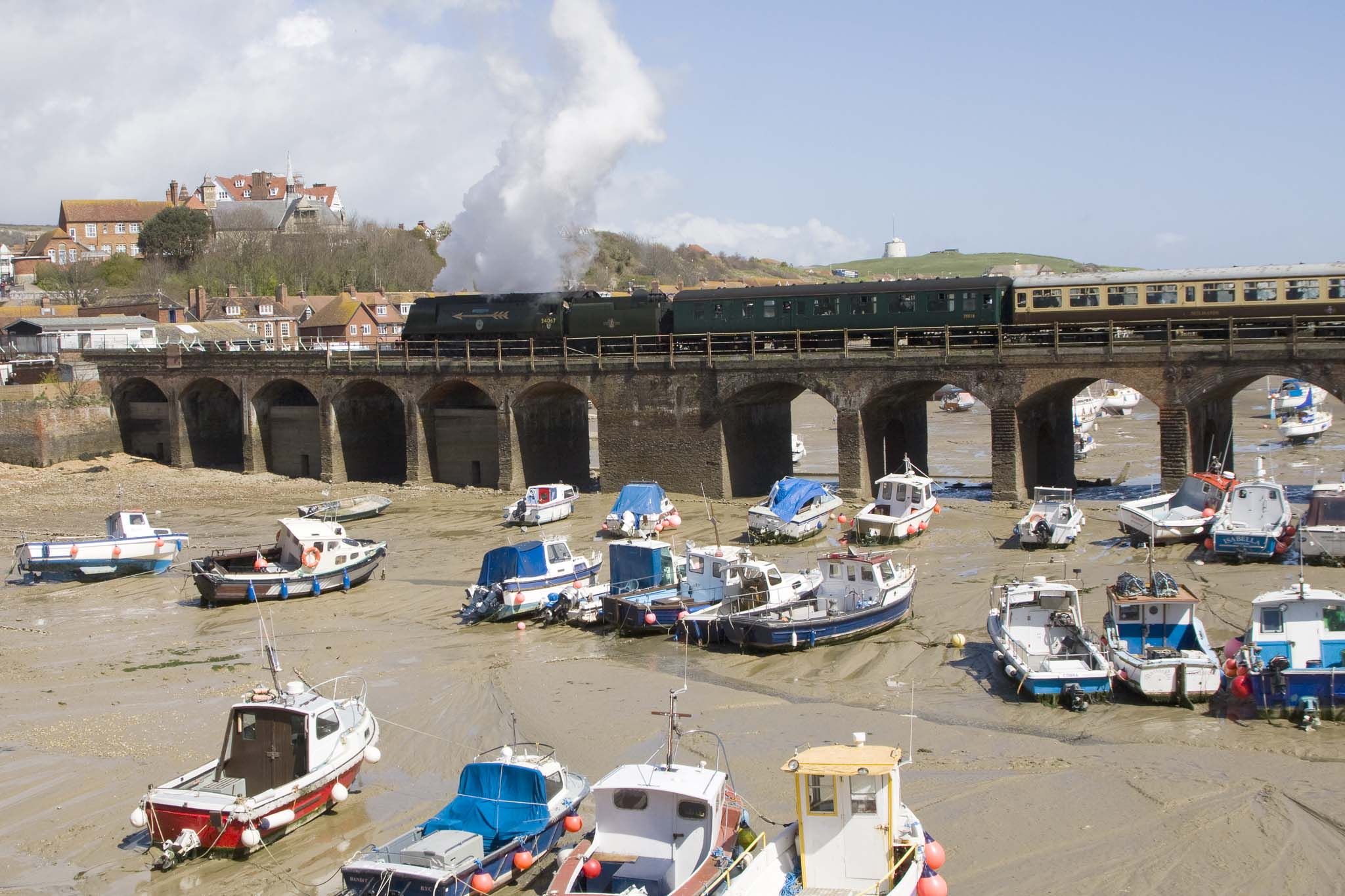
Folkestone Harbour viaduct

Folkestone Harbour was in decline in the 1830s, as nearby Dover became an increasingly important cross-channel port. Ships had difficulty approaching because of drifting shingle blocking the entryway. The harbour was acquired by the South Eastern Railway (SER) in August 1843 for redevelopment, but the steep chalk downs around the town made it impractical to route a main railway line through it. Consequently, a branch line was proposed.

Construction began in 1843, with the line intended mainly for freight. The route left the South Eastern main line at Folkestone Junction (by the then main station) and was double tracked, running at a gradient of 1-in-32 over 1 mile (1.6 km). It reached the harbour on a 138-foot (42 m) viaduct designed by SER chief engineer William Cubitt. A swing bridge was added to the viaduct in 1847, which allowed trains to cross the harbour and reach the southern pier. The harbour was extended over reclaimed land via a stone groyne gradually southwards to catch drifting shingle, which built up and allowed the SER to build a longer pier that ferries could use irrespective of the height of the tide.

For most of its life, the station's main traffic was passengers travelling on boat trains directly from or to London, albeit with a change of direction (reversal) at Folkestone Junction. The SER planned to extend the branch line from Sandling to Sandgate to reach the harbour directly, but were blocked by the Earl of Radnor who owned the land. Nevertheless, the station became popular with passengers in Folkestone as it avoided climbing a steep hill on foot to meet the mainline stations.

The station was opened on 1 January 1849, but was replaced by another on a different site in 1856. This second station went through periods of temporary closure, particularly in wartime: from 29 November 1915 until 1 March 1919; from 4 September 1939 until 1945; from 13 to 20 March 1960; and between 1 January and 11 April 1992.

A three-track-wide goods shed was added to the station in 1881. It was moved in 1899 and 1910, before closing in 1919. It continued to be used for rail purposes until it was demolished in the early 1960s. The swing bridge over the harbour was replaced in 1893. The current bridge was constructed by the Southern Railway in 1930, designed by the company's chief engineer George Ellson.

In 1899, the SER merged with the rival London Chatham and Dover Railway (LCDR) to form the South Eastern and Chatham Railway (SECR). As a consequence, all goods services along the Chatham Main Line were diverted to Folkestone Harbour to serve Boulogne or Calais.

| Preceding station | Disused railways | Following station |
|---|---|---|
| Folkestone Central Line and station open | South Eastern and Chatham Railway Folkestone Harbour Branch | Terminus |

=== 20th – 21st century ===
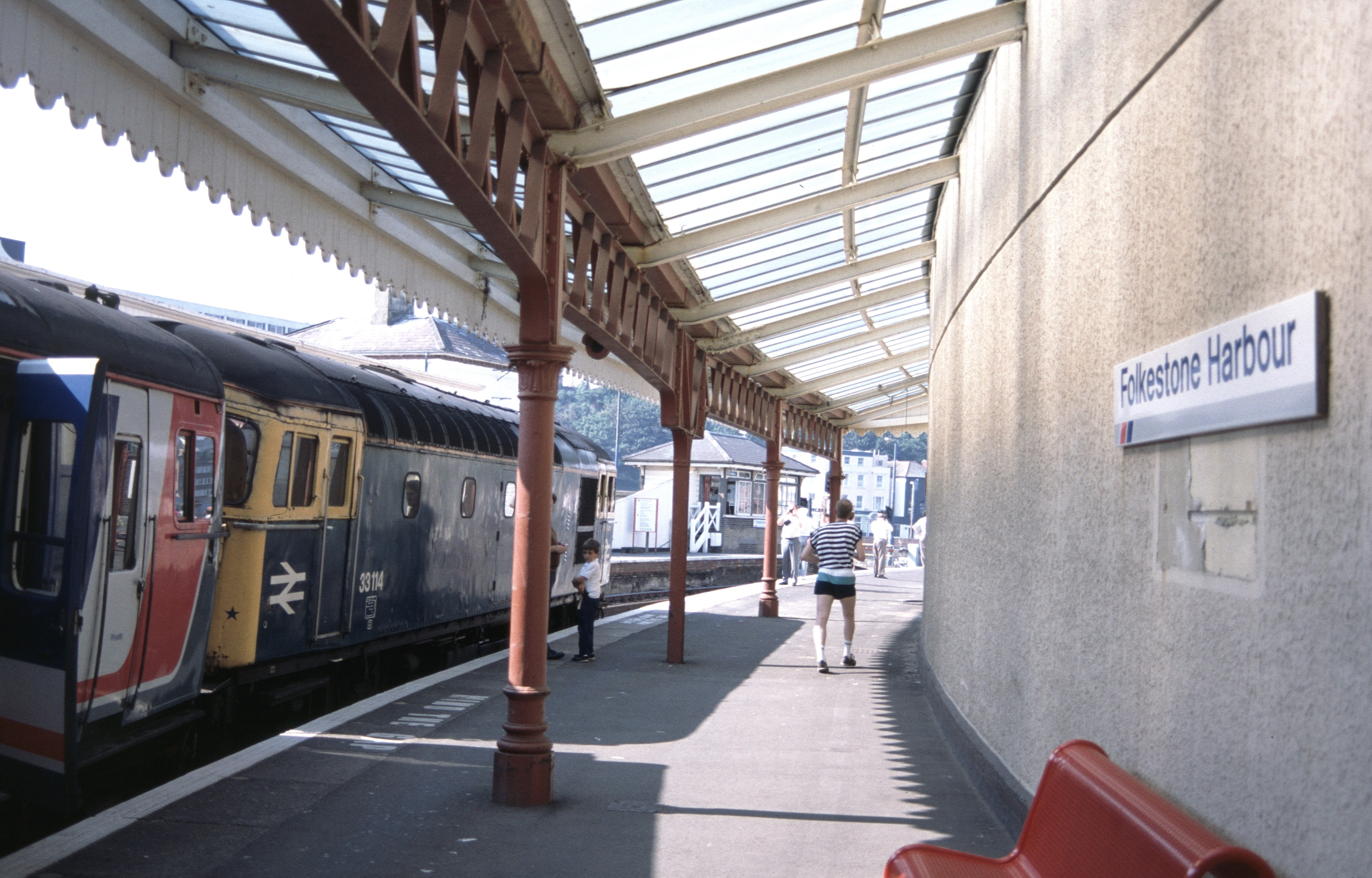
The station in 1991

In 1900, the SECR proposed a 900-foot (270 m) extension to the pier, allowing for more berths. The SER's original wooden pier was replaced with a granite one. Work was completed by 1903 at a cost of £436,000 (£45,840,000 as of 2025). At the same time, the swing bridge over the harbour was replaced. The improved station was opened by the British Ambassador to France, Sir Edmund Monson on 12 July 1904. In 1911, some international goods services transferred from the Port of Queenborough to Folkestone Harbour.

The station was frequently used during World War I, where soldiers would disembark for a ship to Flanders. Around 10 million military personnel and over a million tonnes of freight passed through the harbour. In December 1914, a daily service opened for war refugees from Folkestone Harbour to Holborn Viaduct via Orpington and Herne Hill. Following the war, there was a shortage of steamers and so for a time, there were no passenger services.

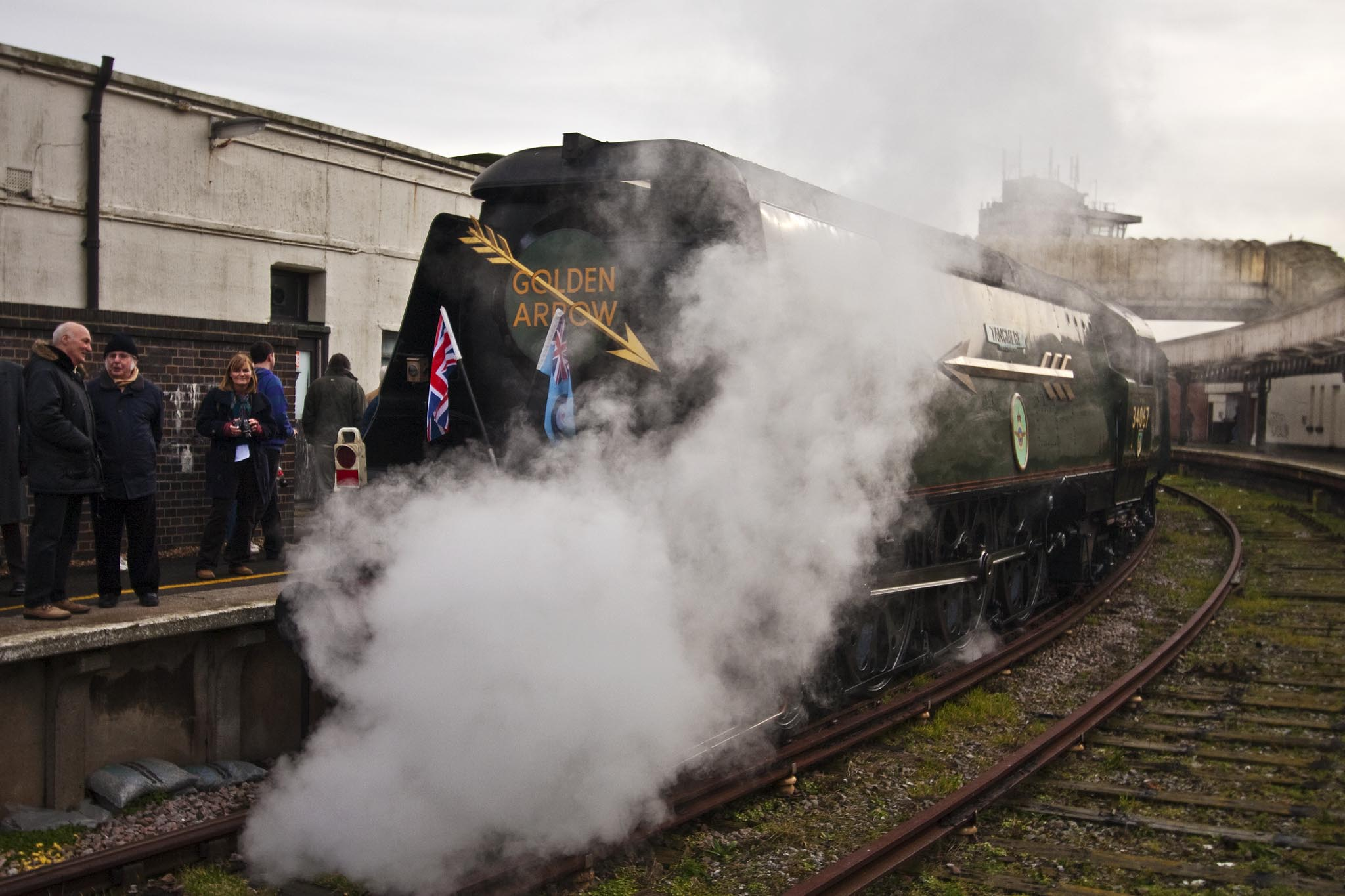
The Golden Arrow at Folkestone Harbour in 2009

The station was substantially rebuilt in 1938–39. The line was electrified at the same time as the main line during the "Kent Coast Electrification – Stage 2" in June 1961, and passenger trains were formed of electric multiple units. Freight services were withdrawn on 17 August 1968. A transparent footbridge was built over the station in 1980, to avoid having to cross an electrified line.

In 1994, the opening of the nearby Channel Tunnel led to the majority of ferry operators moving to other ports in the South East, with the result that only two services per day were arriving at Folkestone Harbour, to connect with the Hoverspeed SeaCat services. When these were moved to Ramsgate, the station closed to cross-channel rail traffic in 2001. Shortly afterwards, the line was reduced to single track operation. In 2003, a report showed that the line over the viaduct was rusty and the station as "deserted and decrepit".

On 20 May 2004, the Venice-Simplon Orient Express (VSOE) began two scheduled services per week from Victoria to Paris via Ashford and Folkestone Harbour, reversing at Folkestone Junction. These services lasted until 2008.

The swing bridge and viaduct over the harbour was Grade II listed in January 2012. Its listing by Historic England refers to "group" value with the harbour's east pier and lighthouse, which are also Grade II listed.

== Closure ==
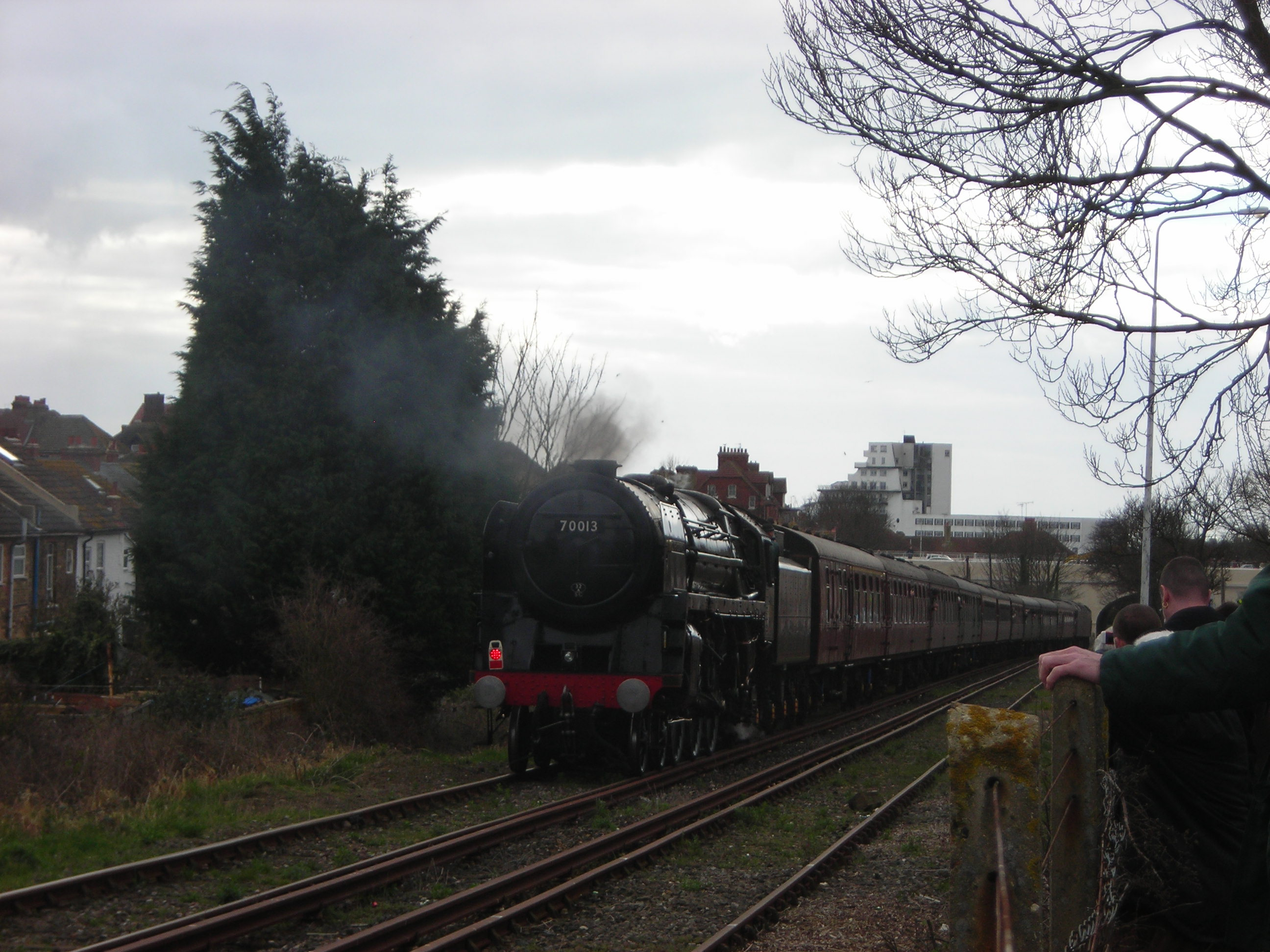
The last train service to leave the station, March 2009

In 2006, 1,000 new houses and apartments were planned around Folkestone Harbour, but they could not be practically served by the branch line. Network Rail decided that it could not justify maintaining the route, so it began the process to close the station permanently, turning the viaduct into a pedestrian walkway. The closure was objected to by the freight carrier DB Schenker, the Department for Transport (DfT) and Southeastern. During 2008, the VSOE still used Folkestone Harbour with its last train travelling on 13 November. A small number of trains visited the branch thereafter; the final one was a steam-hauled rail tour by 70013 Oliver Cromwell from Victoria on 14 March 2009.

As part of the redevelopment proposals, Network Rail planned to demolish the line once it had been closed. A group named the Remembrance Line Association formed, opposing this action with the hope that the line could be turned into a heritage railway and the station into a museum. The group included future UK Independence Party leader Henry Bolton. On 21 December 2008, the Remembrance Line Association ran a railtour to the branch using the Southern Railway preserved diesel electric Class 201 No. 1001.

On 20 March 2009, Network Rail announced they had begun the formal process to close the line and station on cost grounds, having redeveloped Folkestone West with new waiting facilities for the VSOE passengers. By August 2010, the closure process had not proceeded past the statutory "mothballing" stage, making the railway still officially operational so that all objections could be properly addressed. On 20 November 2013, the DfT published a proposal to close the line and station serving Folkestone Harbour. Consultation on the closure ended on 28 February 2014, and the line was formally closed on 31 May.

== Restoration ==
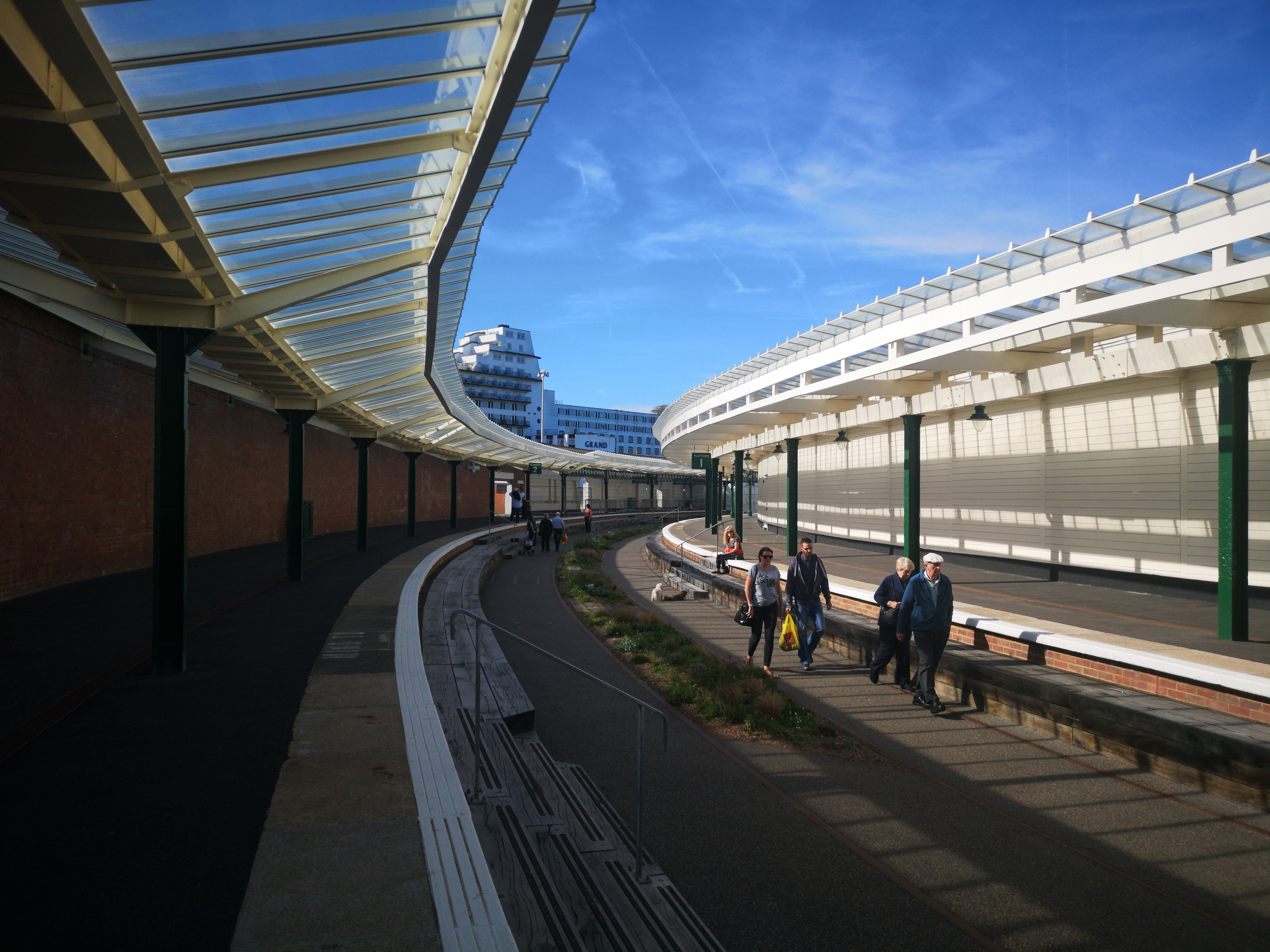
View of Folkestone Harbour station platforms 1 and 2 following 2018 refurbishment works. (The Grand Burstin Hotel is visible in the background.)

In 2015, the Folkestone Harbour Company commenced a £3.5 million project to refurbish the viaduct and the station, retaining the remaining tracks, and repairing the canopies and the customs house. The viaduct across the harbour was opened as a pedestrian route in 2017. The station and harbour front were redeveloped into markets and food stalls. The station is planned to become integrated into the wider development of the beachfront and the harbour.

Though the station, viaduct and harbour have been extensively redeveloped, the northern part of the link to the main line has been mothballed, with no definitive plans.

== Incidents ==
On 19 March 1844, a platelayer was killed on the incline leading into the station when he was hit by a coal train without brakes.
