= Folkestone West railway station =

Railway station in Kent, England

Coordinates: 51.085°N 1.154°E

Folkestone West
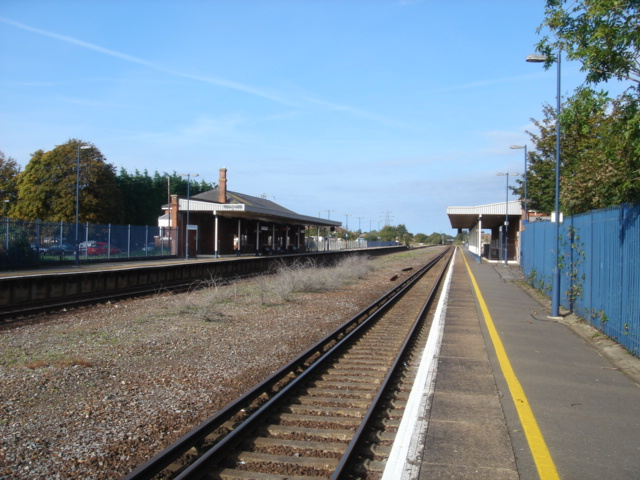

General information
- Location: Cheriton, Folkestone & Hythe; England
- Grid reference: TR209364
- Manager: Southeastern
- Platforms: 2

Other information
- Station code: FKW
- Classification: DfT category E

Key dates
- 1 November 1863: Opened as "Shorncliffe Camp"
- 2 July 1926: Renamed "Shorncliffe"
- 10 September 1962: Renamed "Folkestone West"

Passengers
- 2020/21: ▼0.201 million
- Interchange: ▼479
- 2021/22: ▲0.513 million
- Interchange: ▲1,499
- 2022/23: ▲0.610 million
- Interchange: ▲1,869
- 2023/24: ▲0.679 million
- Interchange: ▲2,580
- 2024/25: ▲0.970 million
Location
Notes
- Passenger statistics from the Office of Rail and Road

Folkestone West railway station is on the South Eastern Main Line in England, serving the western area of Folkestone, Kent. It is 69 miles 22 chains (111.5 km) down the line from London Charing Cross. All trains that call are operated by Southeastern.

The ticket office, in a room on the extensive 'up' side buildings on the London-bound platform, is staffed only during part of the day; at other times a PERTIS permit to travel machine, located outside the ticket office, suffices. The substantial 'down' (country-bound) platform building is occupied as offices by Network Rail.

== History ==
The South Eastern Main Line reached Folkestone in 1843, with a station being opened at Folkestone Junction (Folkestone East) on 18 December 1843. Folkestone West was opened on 1 November 1863 as Shorncliffe Camp, initially with two platform faces either side of double track. In 1881 the station was rebuilt with two platform faces either side of four tracks. Sometime around 1887 a bay was added to the down platform as from 1887 to 1947 the station served as the southern terminus and interchange for the Elham Valley Railway with services to Canterbury. The station was altered during the 1960–61 Kent Coast Electrification as the line from Folkestone Central to near the site of Cheriton Junction was quadrupled. Following the opening of the Channel Tunnel and the loss of the boat train traffic, in 1994 the two centre tracks were removed.

In 2008 alterations were made on the north side of the station to provide car parking and coach loading bays, the latter in connection with the operation of the 'Orient Express' which until then operated from Folkestone Harbour Station. These services were discontinued in 2024.

== Services ==
All services at Folkestone West are operated by Southeastern using Class 375 and 395 EMUs.

The typical off-peak service in trains per hour is:

- 1 tph to London St Pancras International
- 1 tph to London Charing Cross via Tonbridge
- 2 tph to Dover Priory of which 1 continues to Ramsgate

During the peak hours, there are also services to and from London Cannon Street and there is also 1 train per day to London Victoria.

Belmond transferred their Orient Express luxury train services to a new facility at Folkestone West from their original location at Folkestone Harbour. The company ran two British Pullman trains per week between the end of March and the beginning of November, which connected via the Channel Tunnel with the Venice Simplon Orient Express train in Calais. In 2024, the UK leg of the Orient Express ended altogether, with passengers now required to join the train in Paris.

| Preceding station | National Rail | Following station |
|---|---|---|
| Sandling | Southeastern South Eastern Main Line | Folkestone Central |
| Ashford International | Southeastern High Speed 1 | Folkestone Central |
| London Victoria | Belmond: London-Paris-Venice; March to November | Calais-Ville via Eurotunnel Shuttle |
| | Disused railways | |
| Cheriton Halt | Southern Railway Elham Valley Railway | Terminus |
