= Folkestone Central railway station =

Railway station in Kent, England

Coordinates: 51.0827°N 1.1697°E

Folkestone Central
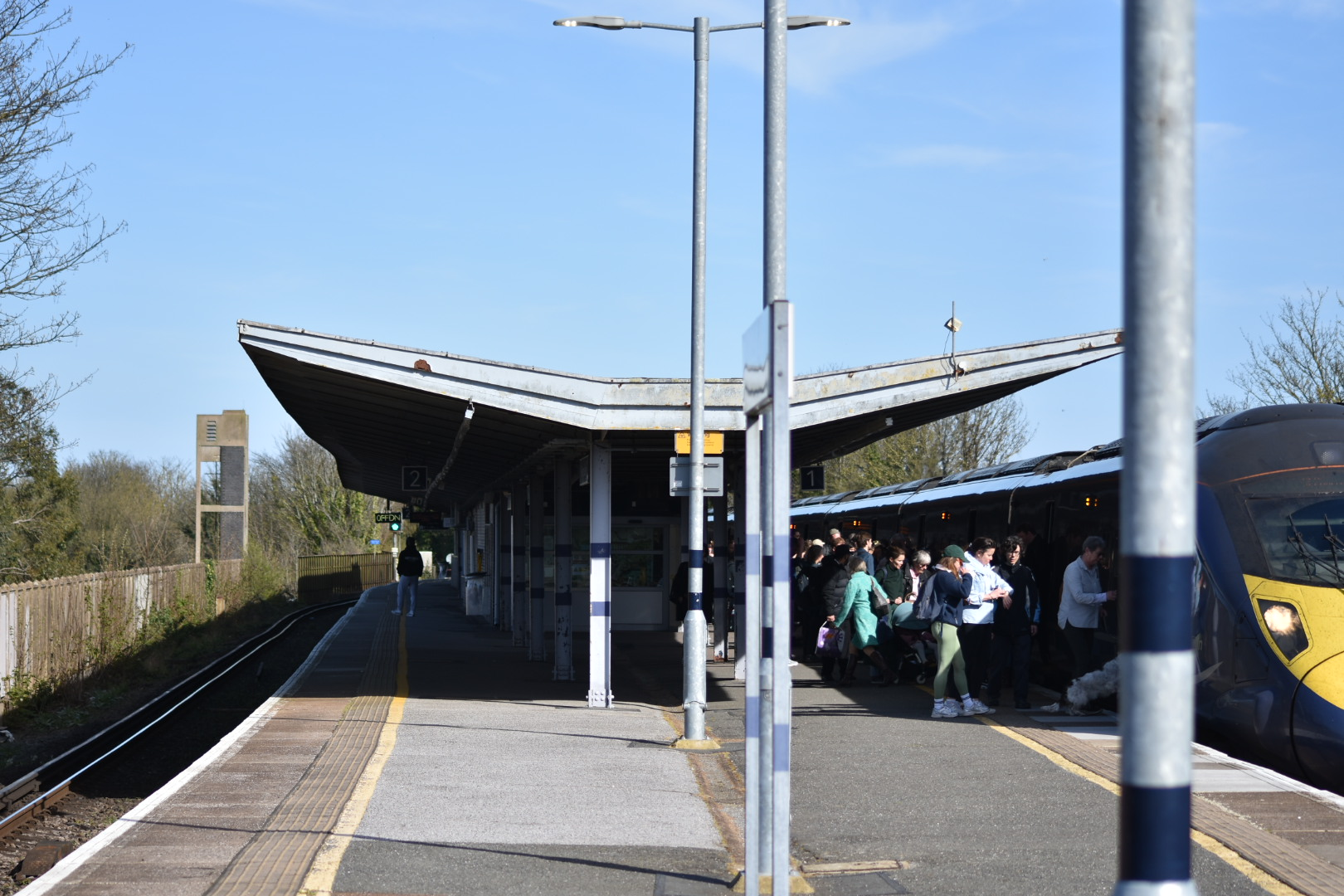

General information
- Location: Folkestone, Folkestone & Hythe; England
- Grid reference: TR220362
- Manager: Southeastern
- Platforms: 2

Other information
- Station code: FKC
- Classification: DfT category C1

Key dates
- 1 September 1884: Opened as "Cheriton Arch"
- September 1886: Renamed "Radnor Park"
- 1 June 1895: Renamed "Folkestone Central"

Passengers
- 2020/21: ▼0.268 million
- Interchange: ▼2,144
- 2021/22: ▲0.683 million
- Interchange: ▲7,455
- 2022/23: ▲0.812 million
- Interchange: ▲15,263
- 2023/24: ▲0.903 million
- Interchange: ▲17,044
- 2024/25: ▼0.817 million
- Interchange: ▼601
Location
Notes
- Passenger statistics from the Office of Rail and Road

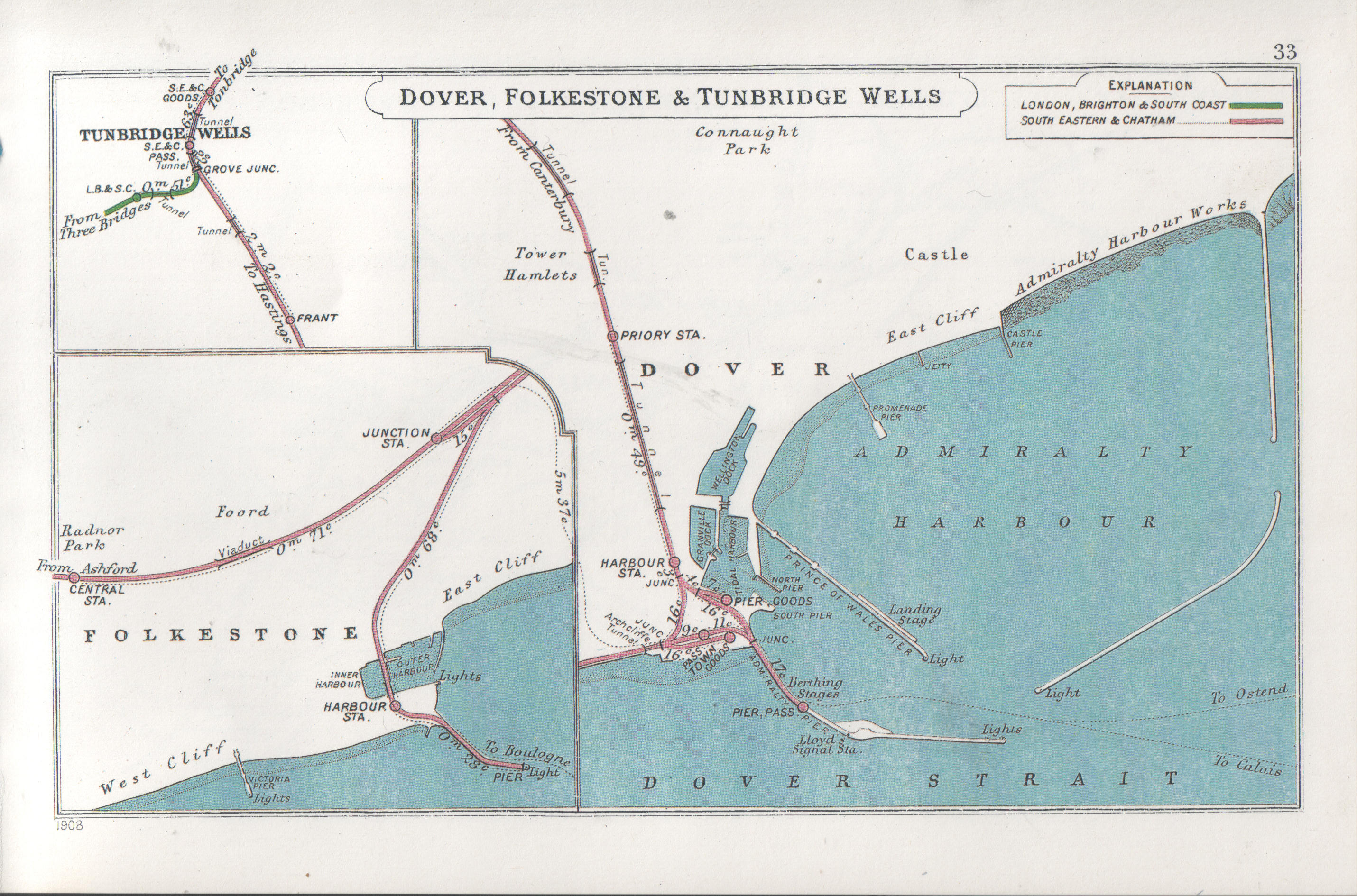
A 1908 Railway Clearing House map of lines around Folkestone (lower left)

Folkestone Central railway station is on the South Eastern Main Line in England, and is the main station serving the town of Folkestone, Kent. It is 69 miles 73 chains (112.5 km) down the line from London Charing Cross. All trains that call are operated by Southeastern.

== History ==
The South Eastern Main Line reached Folkestone in 1843, with a station being opened at Folkestone Junction (Folkestone East) on 18 December 1843. Folkestone West was then opened in 1863, with a station named Cheriton Arch being provided between the two on 1 September 1884. The name Radnor Park was adopted in 1886, and for a few years with just two platform faces, the station was rebuilt in 1890 to add a bay. The station was renamed Folkestone Central in 1895.

The station was rebuilt at the time of the route's electrification in 1961 with two island platforms, linked by a subway and with ramps leading up from the ticket office and concourse, which is itself above street level (an approach road and accompanying pedestrian ramp leads up from Cheriton Road). In 1999 one island platform was abandoned, along with the subway; the platform has not been demolished, although all buildings have been removed.

Services to and from Dover Priory were suspended on 24 December 2015 due to major damage to the track and sea wall near Dover harbour caused by strong winds & tidal surges. A replacement bus service was in operation between the two stations, along with a modified timetable whilst repair work was carried out. A new £44.5 million viaduct was constructed to replace the old rail embankment and sea wall. The line reopened on 5 September 2016, as the work progressed faster than originally anticipated.

== Services ==
All services at Folkestone Central are operated by Southeastern using Class 375 and 395 EMUs.

The typical off-peak service in trains per hour is:

- 1 tph to London St Pancras International
- 1 tph to London Charing Cross via Tonbridge
- 2 tph to Dover Priory of which 1 continues to Ramsgate

During the peak hours, there are also services to and from London Cannon Street and there is also 1 train per day to London Victoria.

Preceding station	National Rail	Following station
Folkestone West	Southeastern South Eastern Main Line	Dover Priory
Folkestone West	Southeastern High Speed 1	Dover Priory
	Disused railways	
Folkestone West Line and station open	British Rail Southern Region South Eastern Main Line	Folkestone East Line open, station closed
Folkestone West Line and station open	British Rail Southern Region South Eastern Main Line	Folkestone Warren Halt Line open, station closed
Folkestone West Line and station open	South Eastern and Chatham Railway Folkestone Harbour Branch	Folkestone Harbour Line and station closed
