= Folkestone East railway station =

Former railway station in England

Coordinates: 51.087409°N 1.189036°E

Folkestone East
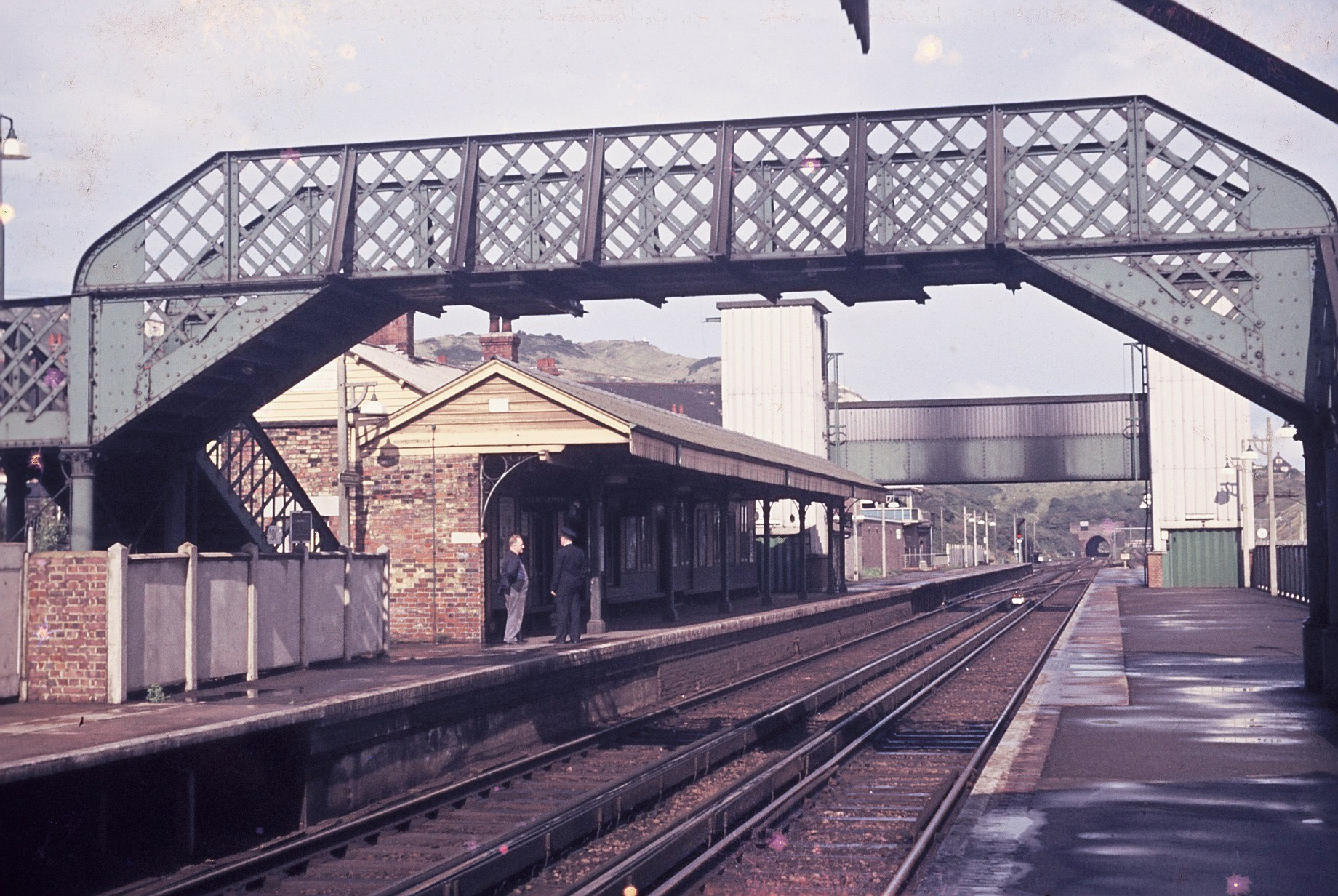
- Folkestone East railway station in 1965

General information
- Location: Folkestone, Folkestone & Hythe; England
- Grid reference: TR234368
- Platforms: 2

Other information
- Status: Disused

History
- Original company: South Eastern Railway
- Pre-grouping: South Eastern and Chatham Railway
- Post-grouping: Southern Railway; Southern Region of British Railways

Key dates
- 18 December 1843: Opened as Folkestone
- July 1849: Renamed Folkestone Old
- January 1852: Renamed Folkestone Junction
- September 1858: Renamed Folkestone Junction (Shorncliffe)
- November 1863: Renamed Folkestone Junction
- April 1884: Renamed Folkestone
- June 1897: Renamed Folkestone Junction
- 10 September 1962: Renamed Folkestone East
- 6 September 1965: Closed
Location

Folkestone East is a former railway station in Folkestone, England. Opened by the South Eastern Railway in 1843 as part of its main line from London, it was Folkestone's first station and handled substantial boat train traffic travelling to the Continent via Folkestone Harbour. Passenger traffic declined in later years with the opening of other more convenient stations in the town and the station eventually closed in 1965.

== History ==
The South Eastern Railway (SER) opened the first permanent railway station in Folkestone in December 1843. Constructed high above the shore at the rear of the town, it was initially named Folkestone and replaced a temporary station built to the west pending the construction of Sir William Cubitt's 19-arch Foord viaduct. To the north of the station, the SER constructed a branch line to Folkestone Harbour which the railway company had purchased earlier the same year. The branch had no direct connection with the main line and instead trailed into a siding near Folkestone station requiring trains to reverse in order to join the main line; this arrangement (which once existed at Tonbridge) was a safety measure as the line to the harbour descends on an incline of 1 in 30 for 0.75 miles (1.21 km).

Until the harbour was provided with its own Harbour station in 1849, the SER's first station handled all the passenger traffic for both the town and the harbour, including the boat train traffic from Folkestone to Boulogne which was said to have carried over 20,000 people in the short space of five months. Eight trains each way ran per day, the fastest trains covering the 92 miles (148 km) from London in 3 hours, 5 minutes at an average speed of 29.6 miles per hour (47.6 km/h). Following the opening of the Harbour station, Folkestone station was renamed Folkestone Old and then Folkestone Junction in recognition of its status at the head of an important branch leading to the now busy port. The opening of Folkestone Harbour took away all of the boat-train traffic and much of the town traffic from Folkestone Junction, the remainder being lost with the opening of Shorncliffe Camp (now known as Folkestone West) in 1863.

Goods traffic became the most important business at Folkestone Junction and extensive goods facilities were provided in the 1890s on the former site of the line's coking ovens which had become redundant when the perfection of coal-burning techniques put an end to the production of coke for locomotives. A shed was established on the down side of Folkestone Junction where a small stud of locomotives was kept to help services travelling to the harbour gather the necessary momentum to climb the 1 in 30 incline on the harbour branch. The shed closed in 1961 with the introduction of electric traction on the line.

In September 1962, Shorncliffe was renamed Folkestone West and Folkestone Junction became Folkestone East. The station closed to passengers three years later.

Preceding station	Disused railways	Following station
Folkestone Central Line and station open	British Rail Southern Region South Eastern Main Line	Folkestone Warren Halt Line open, station closed

== Present and future ==
All the original station buildings dating from 1844 were demolished shortly after the station closing. A short length of the down platform remained outside the signal box and was retained for use by staff. As at March 2017 most of the up platform was still in situ.

Various schemes for the re-use of the remaining land at Folkestone East have been proposed, from the site of a new depot, sidings for stabling and maintaining CTRL services and a new passenger station. The site of the former goods yard was offered for sale in January 2008.
