= Dover Priory railway station =

Railway station in Kent, England

Coordinates: 51°7′34.16″N 1°18′18.43″E

Dover Priory
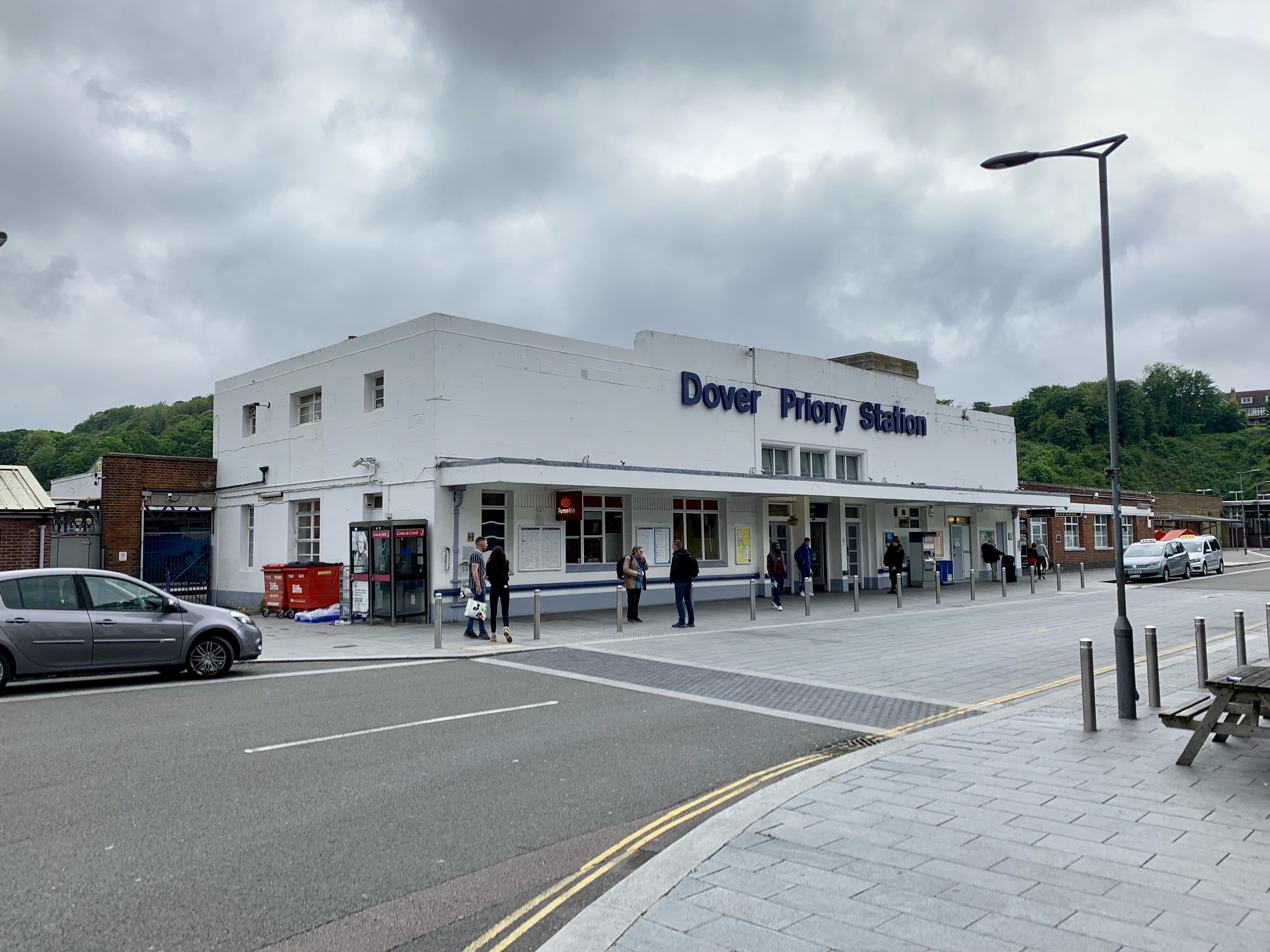
- The station entrance

General information
- Location: Dover, District of Dover; England
- Grid reference: TR313415
- Managed by: Southeastern
- Platforms: 3

Other information
- Station code: DVP
- Classification: DfT category D

History
- Opened: 22 July 1861

Passengers
- 2020/21: ▼0.345 million
- Interchange: ▼21,650
- 2021/22: ▲0.732 million
- Interchange: ▲50,356
- 2022/23: ▲0.896 million
- Interchange: ▲70,905
- 2023/24: ▲0.967 million
- Interchange: ▲84,766
- 2024/25: ▲1.029 million
- Interchange: ▲86,844
Location
Notes
- Passenger statistics from the Office of Rail and Road

Dover Priory railway station is the southern terminus of the South Eastern Main Line. It is the main station serving the town of Dover, in Kent, England; the other is Kearsney, on the outskirts. It is 77 miles 26 chains (124.4 km) down the line from London Victoria. The station and all trains that serve the station are operated by Southeastern. It is a 25 min walk away from the Ferry Port.

== History ==
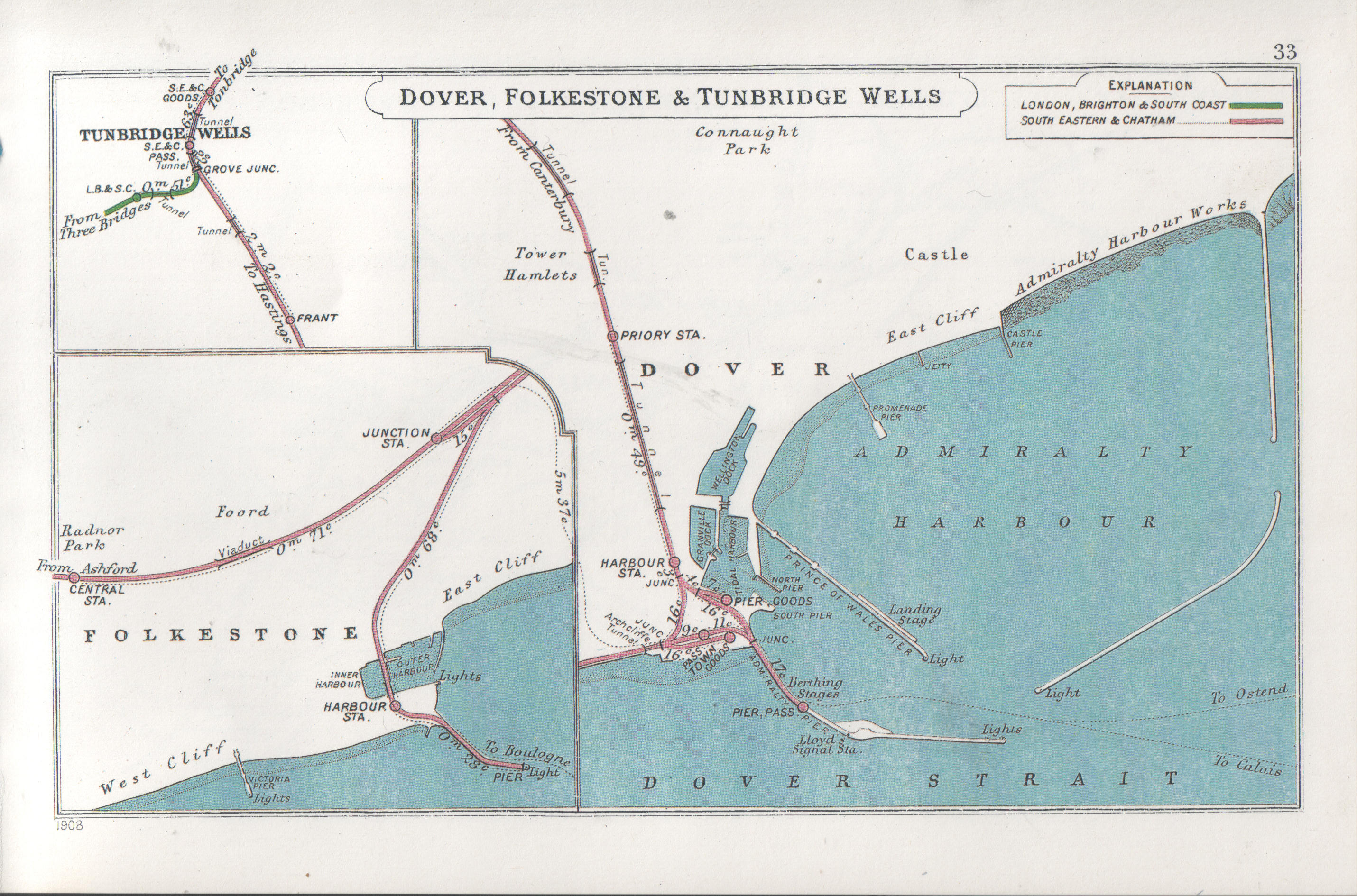
A 1908 Railway Clearing House map of lines around Dover (right)

Dover Priory opened on 22 July 1861 as the temporary terminus of the London, Chatham & Dover Railway (LCDR). It became a through station on 1 November 1861, with the completion of a tunnel through the Western Heights to gain access to the Western Docks area, where LCDR created Dover Harbour station The station was known as Dover Town, but was renamed in July 1863; thus led to rival South Eastern Railway adopting the name for one of its stations.

In 1868, stationmaster Edward Walsh(e) was murdered by 18-year-old Thomas Wells, a porter for the LCDR, after having rebuked him for poor work. Wells was convicted and hanged.

The Southern Railway consolidated passenger services at Priory in 1927 and modernised the station between 1930 and 1932 at a cost of £135,000 (equivalent to £8,150,000 in 2025). The new station reopened on 8 May 1932.

The Chatham Main Line into Priory was electrified by British Railways in 1959, as part of Stage 1 of Kent Coast Electrification, under the BR 1955 Modernisation Plan. The line up to Ramsgate, via Deal, was subsequently electrified under stage two of Kent Coast electrification in January 1961. The line from Folkestone into Priory was electrified in June 1961.

The high-speed service to London St Pancras started in 2009, after the track in the tunnels to the south was realigned to allow for emergency evacuation from rolling stock without end doors.

Services to and from Folkestone Central were suspended on 24 December 2015, due to major damage to the track and sea wall near Dover harbour caused by strong winds and tidal surges. A replacement bus service was in operation between the two stations, along with a modified timetable whilst repair work was carried out. This was expected to continue throughout 2016, whilst a new £44.5 million viaduct was constructed to replace the present rail embankment and sea wall. The project was scheduled for completion in December 2016, but progressed faster than originally anticipated; the line reopened on 5 September 2016.

== Services ==
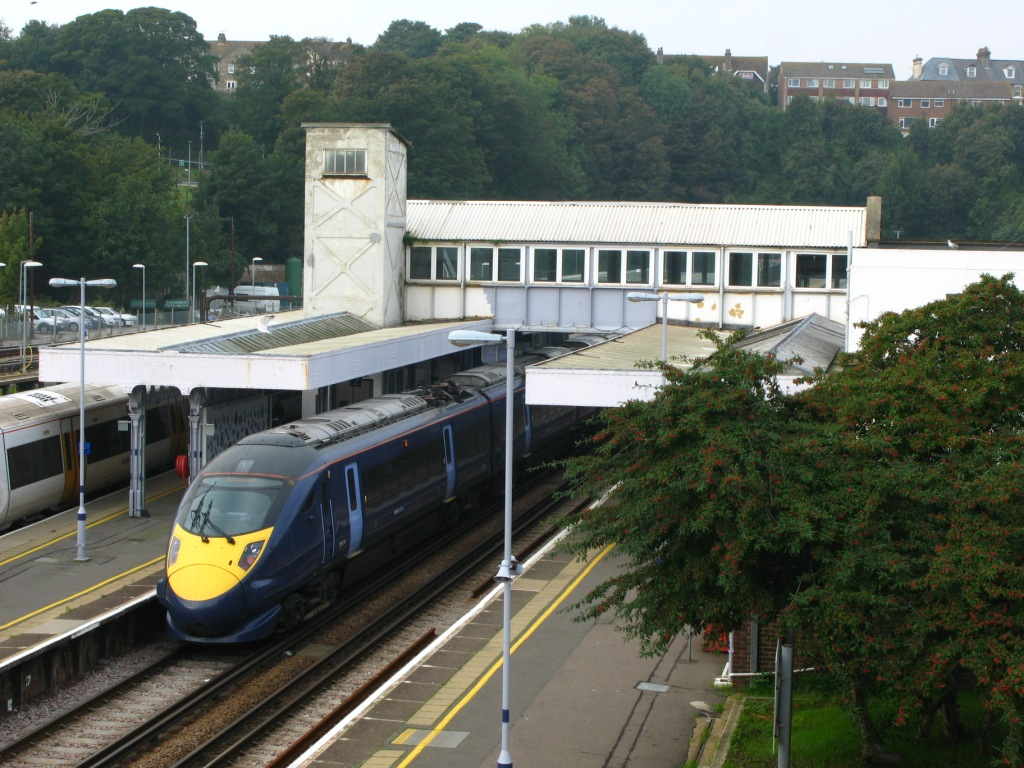
A high speed service to St Pancras

All services at Dover Priory are operated by Southeastern using Class 375 and 395 electric multiple units.

The typical off-peak service in trains per hour is:

- 1 tph to London Charing Cross via Tonbridge
- 1 tph to London Victoria via Chatham
- 1 tph to London St Pancras International
- 1 tph to Ramsgate

Additional services, including trains to and from London Cannon Street call at the station during peak hours.

Preceding station	National Rail	Following station
Folkestone Central	Southeastern High Speed 1 Kent Coast line	Martin Mill
Folkestone Central	Southeastern South Eastern Main Line	Terminus
Kearsney	Southeastern Chatham Main Line - Dover Branch	Terminus
	Disused railways	
Kearsney Line and station open	British Rail; Southern Region Chatham Main Line - Dover Branch	Dover Marine Line and station closed
Kearsney Line and station open	British Rail; Southern Region Chatham Main Line - Dover Branch	Dover Harbour Line open, station closed

== See also ==
- List of railway stations in Dover
- Port of Dover
- Port of Calais
