= Folkestone and Hythe District =

Coordinates: 51°4′43.86″N 1°10′28.61″E

- Non-metropolitan district
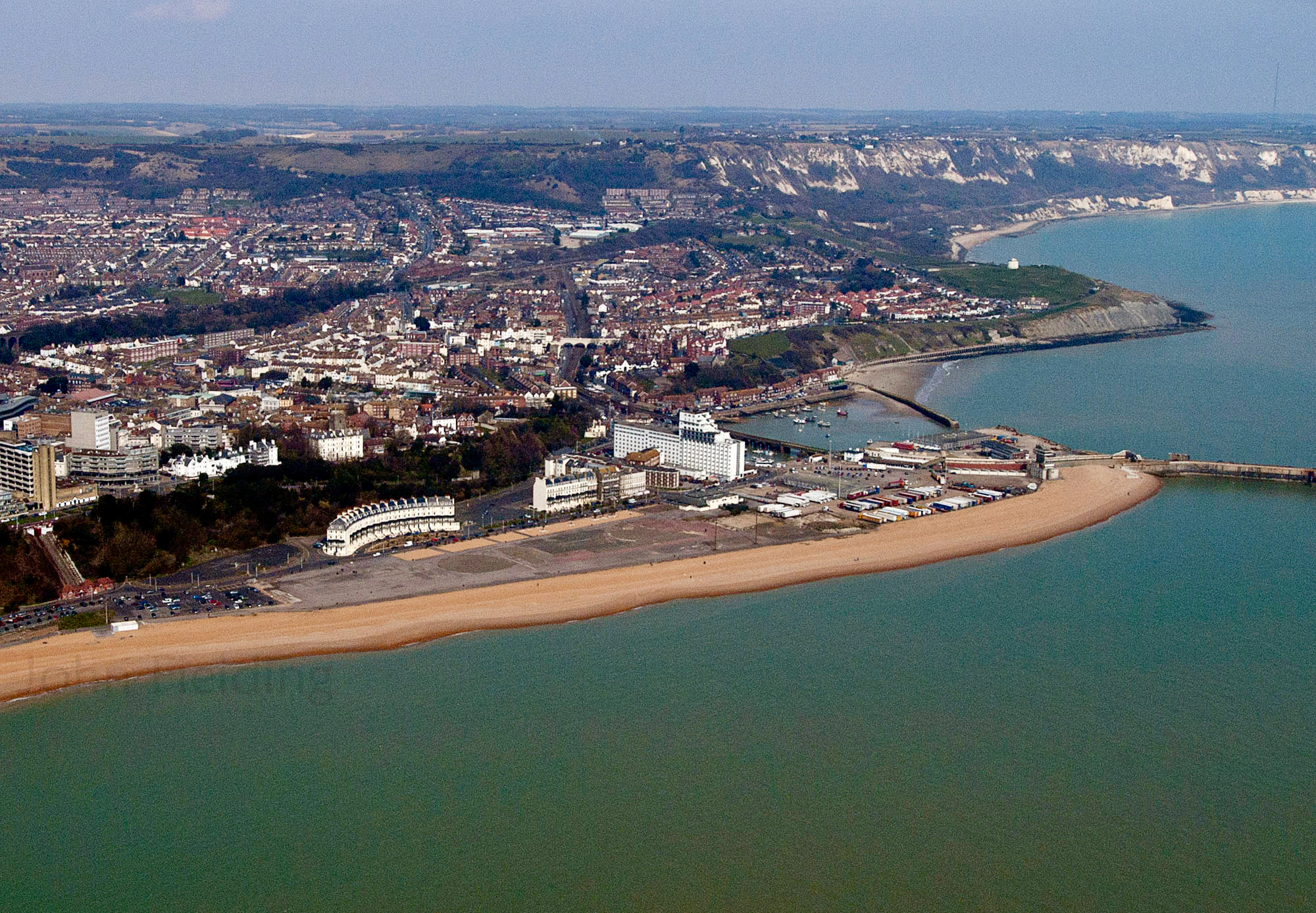
- Folkestone skyline and surrounding coastline

- Folkestone and Hythe shown within Kent
- Sovereign state: United Kingdom
- Constituent country: England
- Region: South East England
- Non-metropolitan county: Kent
- Status: Non-metropolitan district
- Admin HQ: Folkestone
- Incorporated: 1 April 1974

Government
  - Type: Non-metropolitan district council
  - Body: Folkestone & Hythe District Council
  - MPs: Tony Vaughan

Area
  - Total: 137.7 sq mi (356.7 km^{2})
  - Rank: 100th (of 296)

Population (2025)
  - Total: 112,163
  - Rank: 224th (of 296)
  - Density: 814.4/sq mi (314.4/km^{2})

Ethnicity (2021)
  - Ethnic groups: List: 92.6% White; 3.9% Asian; 1.9% Mixed; 1% other; 0.6% Black

Religion (2021)
  - Religion: List: 48% Christianity; 41.8% no religion; 5.7% not stated; 1.5% Hinduism; 1% Islam; 1% Buddhism; 0.9% other; 0.2% Judaism; 0.1% Sikhism
- Time zone: UTC0 (GMT)
  - Summer (DST): UTC+1 (BST)
- ONS code: 29UL (ONS); E07000112 (GSS)
- OS grid reference: TR2233835912

Folkestone and Hythe is a local government district in Kent, England. It lies in the south-east of the county, on the coast of the English Channel. The district was formed in 1974 and was originally named Shepway after one of the ancient lathes of Kent, which had covered a similar area. The district was renamed in 2018. The council is based in Folkestone, the district's largest town. The district also includes the towns of Hawkinge, Hythe, Lydd and New Romney, along with numerous villages and surrounding rural areas.

The North Downs hills extend into the north of the district, parts of which fall within the designated Area of Outstanding Natural Beauty of the Kent Downs. Much of the south of the district forms the low-lying Romney Marsh, an area of land partly reclaimed from the sea. The district contains the Eurotunnel Folkestone Terminal, the main interchange for road vehicles at the UK end of the Channel Tunnel.

The neighbouring districts (anti-clockwise from north-east) are Dover, Canterbury, Ashford and Rother. The latter is in East Sussex, the rest are in Kent. To the south-east is the sea.

== History ==
The modern district was created on 1 April 1974 under the Local Government Act 1972, covering the area of six former districts, which were all abolished at the same time:

- Elham Rural District
- Folkestone Municipal Borough
- Hythe Municipal Borough
- Lydd Municipal Borough
- New Romney Municipal Borough
- Romney Marsh Rural District

The new district was originally named Shepway, after one of the lathes of Kent. The lathe had historically covered a similar, but not identical, area to the modern district; some parts from the north-east of the old lathe are in Dover District, some parts from the north-west are in Ashford Borough.

Map showing the lathe of Shepway in 1900 compared with the district of Shepway in 1974, with the parishes now in Dover and Ashford districts indicated

Lathes were administrative and judicial subdivisions of Kent from Anglo-Saxon times. This lathe had probably originated in the 6th century, during the Jutish colonisation, as the territory of the Limenwara people. It was originally named Lympne after the village where its courts were held, but by the 13th century the lathe's name had been changed to Shepway. The court of Shepway, which met at Shepway Cross at Lympne, also played an important role in the administration of the Cinque Ports.

The lathes were never formally abolished, but gradually lost their administrative functions from the 17th century onwards. By the end of the 19th century they had no remaining functions.

In 2018 the council voted to change the name of the district, on the basis that the name Shepway only had limited recognition from the public and businesses. It decided to rename the district after its two largest towns, which together have nearly two thirds of the district's population. Supporters of the change argued it would improve awareness of the area and encourage investment and regeneration. The change of name took effect on 1 April 2018. The name was already used for the Folkestone and Hythe constituency, created in 1950, which covers a similar area to the district.

Under current local government reorganisation plans, all district councils in Kent, as well as the county council, will be abolished in 2028, with the district becoming part of a new Mid Kent unitary authority.

== Governance ==
Folkestone & Hythe District Council

Leadership
- Chair: Paul Thomas, Independent since 6 May 2026
- Leader: Jim Martin, Green since 24 May 2023
- Chief Executive: Susan Priest since 1 April 2018

Structure
- Seats: 30 councillors
- Political groups: Administration (15) Green (11) Liberal Democrats (2) Independent (2) Other parties (15) Labour (8) Conservative (5) Reform UK (1) Independent (1)

Elections
- Voting system: First past the post
- Last election: 4 May 2023

Meeting place
- Civic Centre, Castle Hill Avenue, Folkestone, CT20 2QY

Website
- www.folkestone-hythe.gov.uk

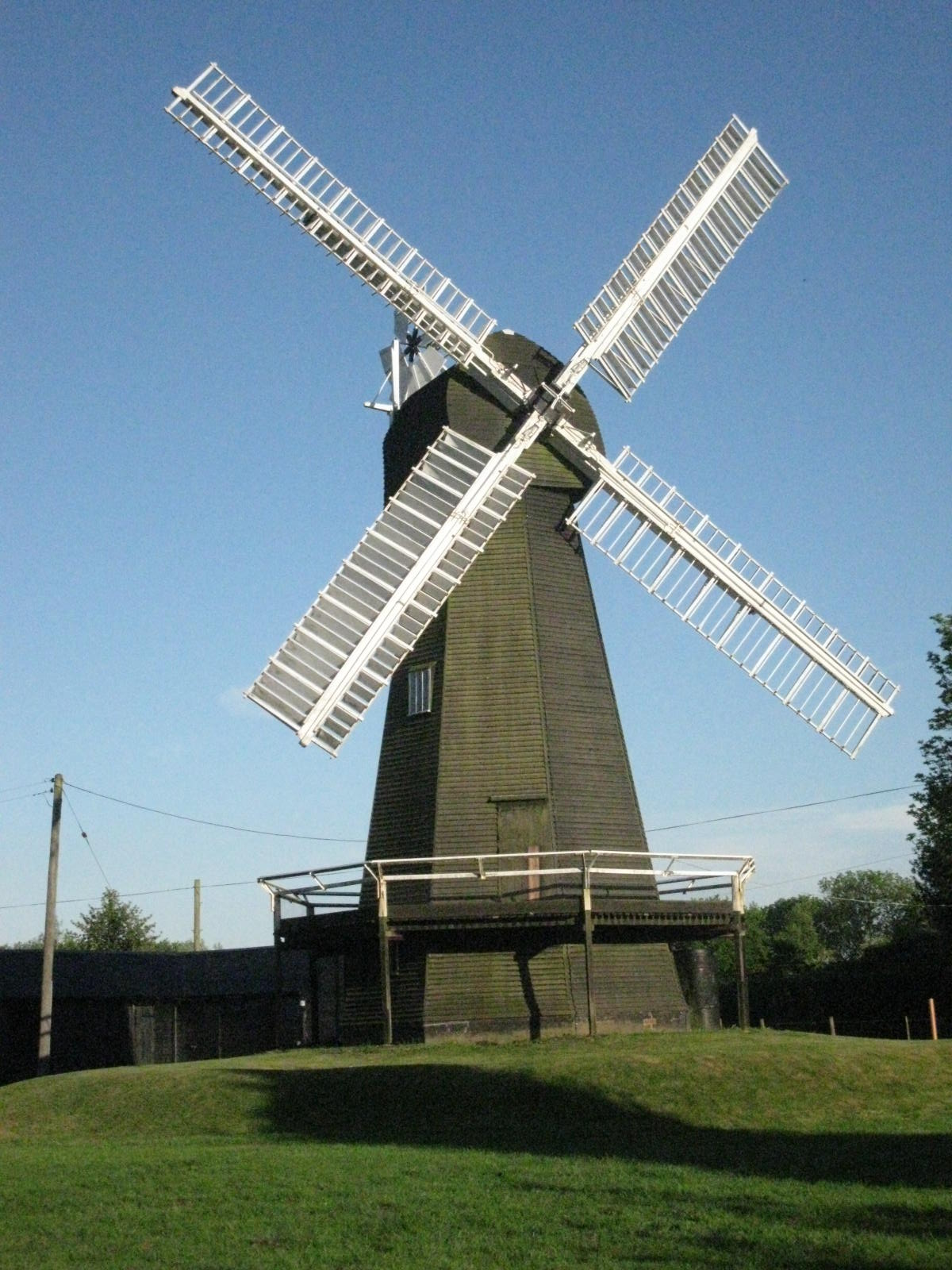
Davison's Mill in Stelling Minnis

Folkestone and Hythe District Council provides district-level services. County-level services are provided by Kent County Council. The district is also entirely covered by civil parishes, which form a third tier of local government.

=== Political control ===
The council has been under no overall control since 2019. Following the 2023 election a minority administration of the Green Party and Liberal Democrats formed to run the council, led by Green councillor Jim Martin.

The first election to the council was held in 1973, initially operating as a shadow authority before coming into its powers on 1 April 1974. Political control of the council since 1974 has been as follows:

Party in control	Years
Conservative	1974–1987
No overall control	1987–1991
Liberal Democrats	1991–1995
No overall control	1995–1999
Conservative	1999–2003
Liberal Democrats	2003–2004
No overall control	2004–2007
Conservative	2007–2019
No overall control	2019–present

=== Leadership ===
The leaders of the council since 1999 have been:

Councillor	Party	From	To
Rory Love	Conservative	12 May 1999	May 2003
Linda Cufley	Liberal Democrats	14 May 2003	5 Aug 2004
Robert Bliss	Conservative	5 Aug 2004	15 May 2013
David Monk	Conservative	15 May 2013	May 2023
Jim Martin	Green	24 May 2023	

=== Composition ===
Following the 2023 election and a subsequent by-elections and changes of allegiance up to July 2026, the composition of the council was:

Party	Councillors
Green	11
Labour	8
Conservative	5
Liberal Democrats	2
Reform	1
Independent	3
Total	30

Two of the independent councillors form a group with the Liberal Democrats. This group and the Greens together form the council's administration.

=== Elections ===
Since the last boundary changes in 2015 the council has comprised 30 councillors representing 13 wards, with each ward electing one, two or three councillors. Elections are held every four years.

=== Premises ===
The council is based at the Civic Centre on Castle Hill Avenue. The building was completed in 1966 for the old Folkestone Borough Council. In 2020 the council announced that it was considering the possibility of moving to new premises, although it remains at the Civic Centre as at May 2024.

=== Controversies ===
==== Undeclared gifts from Lydd Airport ====
In 2011, Lydd Airport's owners, seeking to expand the airport, gave gifts to councillors that the councillors did not declare.

==== Otterpool Park planning permission ====
Folkestone and Hythe District Council was reported to have spent over £50m up to July 2020 on a proposed housing development on the former Folkestone Racecourse site, despite the 10,000 home scheme not having planning permission. The site had been bought for £4m in 2016 by the billionaire Reuben brothers via a British Virgin Islands-registered company 'Cozumel Estates' who then submitted development proposals to the council for approval, in a partnership with the council. The brothers withdrew from the scheme in 2019 and sold the site to the council for £25m in 2020. The local authority granted permission for Otterpool Park in 2023.

== Geography ==
Folkestone and Hythe occupies the most southerly part of Kent. It is bounded on the north by Ashford and Canterbury Districts; on the east by Dover District and on the south by the Strait of Dover. The Romney and Walland Marshes cover a good deal of its area to the west; where the North Downs begin to reach the sea there is much more in the way of settlement. Four out of five towns in the District are located along the coast. The district area is the same size as the similarly named Folkestone & Hythe parliamentary constituency, but leaves out the Saxon Shore ward from the neighbouring Borough of Ashford.

=== Climate ===
Climate in this area has mild differences between highs and lows, and there is adequate rainfall year-round. The Köppen Climate Classification subtype for this climate is "Cfb" (Marine West Coast Climate/Oceanic climate).

Climate data for Folkestone & Hythe, UK
Month	Jan	Feb	Mar	Apr	May	Jun	Jul	Aug	Sep	Oct	Nov	Dec	Year
Mean daily maximum °C (°F)	8 (46)	8 (46)	11 (52)	12 (54)	17 (63)	19 (66)	22 (72)	22 (72)	18 (64)	14 (57)	10 (50)	8 (46)	14 (57)
Mean daily minimum °C (°F)	3 (37)	3 (37)	5 (41)	5 (41)	9 (48)	11 (52)	14 (57)	13 (55)	11 (52)	7 (45)	5 (41)	3 (37)	7 (45)
Average precipitation mm (inches)	38 (1.5)	15 (0.6)	15 (0.6)	23 (0.9)	23 (0.9)	15 (0.6)	18 (0.7)	25 (1)	36 (1.4)	33 (1.3)	18 (0.7)	46 (1.8)	300 (12)
Source: Weatherbase

== Housing and architecture ==
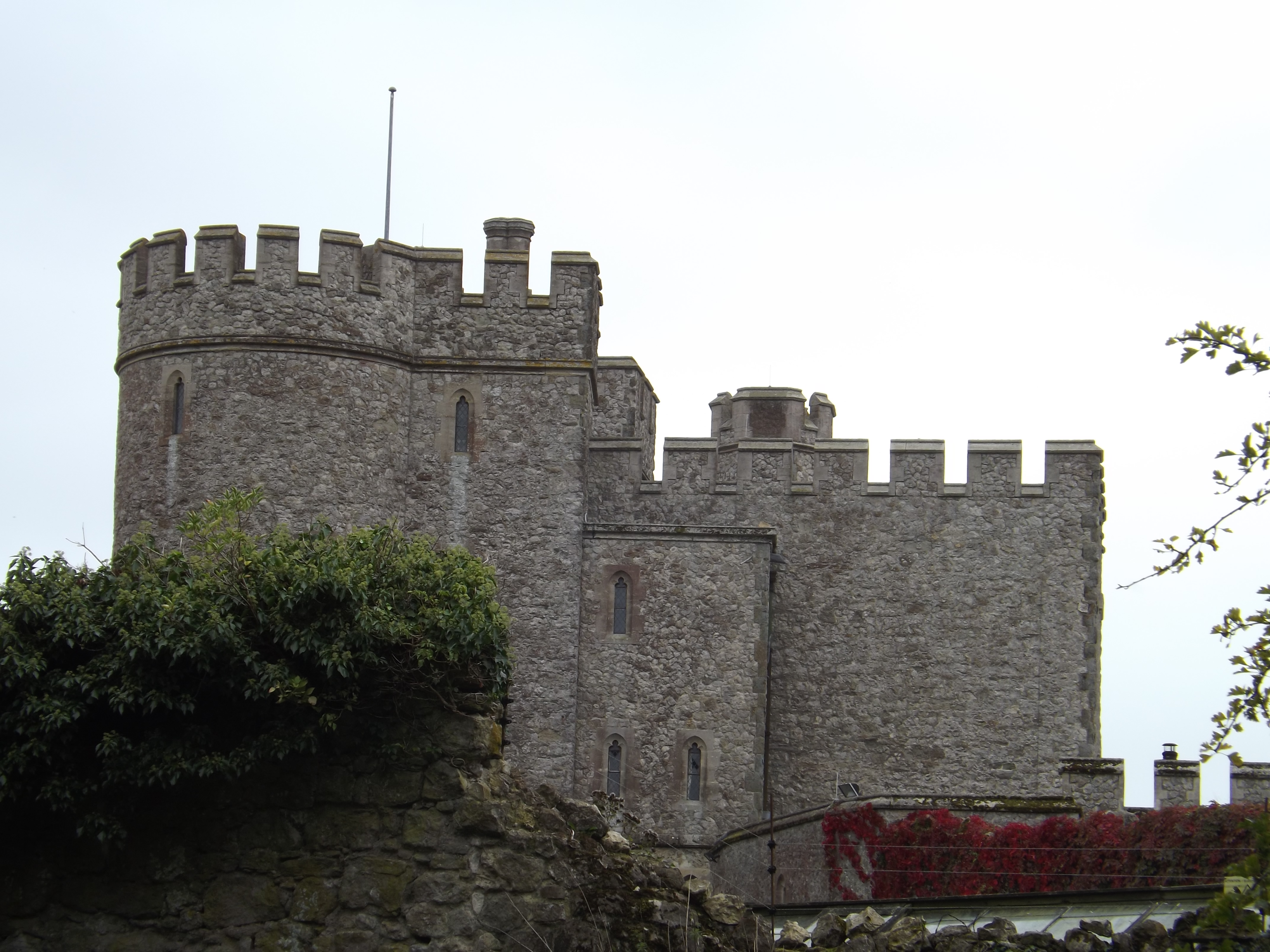
Saltwood Castle

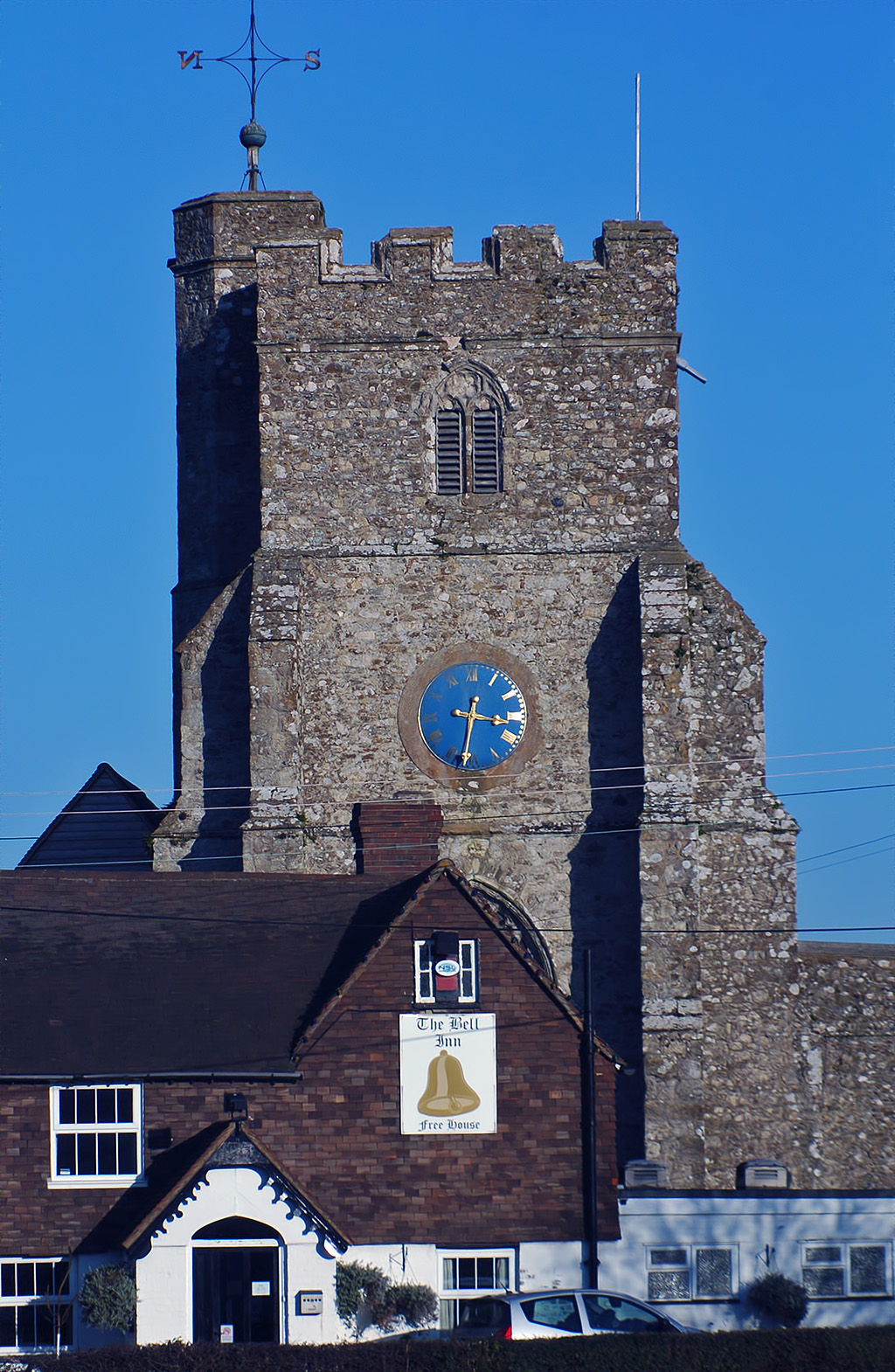
Ivychurch

The layout of the main towns is one of Victorian streets interspersed with apartment blocks, including a few tower blocks with otherwise housing in the district formed of low-rise apartments, semi-detached, terraced or (less often) detached homes with typically smallholdings or small gardens.

The number of listed buildings in the district exceeds 900. This includes 18 churches listed in the highest grading in the national listing system (Grade I). Three castles or their bailey towers survive from the medieval period.

An examples at Grade I is Davison's Mill, a large windmill set by a green rolling lawn.

== Economy ==
In economic terms, Folkestone and Hythe is the third most deprived area in Kent, after Thanet and Swale. Like them, it has a high rate of unemployment; poor educational attainment figures; and with the majority of businesses being small operations. The major source of economy is, however, tourism. Events and venues are widely publicised.

== Media ==
In terms of television, the area is served by BBC South East and ITV Meridian (East) broadcasting from the main Dover transmitter and some associated relays.

Local radio stations are:

- BBC Radio Kent on 97.6 FM and 104.2 FM
- Heart South on 97.0 FM
- KMFM Shepway and White Cliffs Country on 96.4 FM and 106.8 FM which covers the area and the district of Dover
- Academy FM on 105.9 FM (for Folkstone)

== Transport ==
The M20 crosses the north of the District to end at Folkestone, carrying traffic from London, M25 and Maidstone to the district.

Also following the M20 is the A20 which goes by nearby villages in the district. The A20 also continues onto Dover.

The A259 south coast road starts at Folkestone via Hythe, Kent and Romney Marsh in the district to Rye, East Sussex, Hastings, Bexhill-on-Sea, Eastbourne, Brighton, Worthing, Littlehampton, Bognor Regis and Chichester to Emsworth near Portsmouth.

The A260 leaves Folkestone to the A2 for Canterbury.

The A2070 links the Romney Marsh to Ashford and the M20.

Stagecoach South East operate all local buses in the district to Dover, Canterbury, Hastings, Maidstone and Ashford. Stagecoach also run coach route 021 to London from the district on behalf of National Express.

The South Eastern Main Line and High Speed 1 both cross the district. Domestic trains are provided by Southeastern and serve the stations of Westenhanger, Sandling, Folkestone West and Folkestone Central in the district. Trains go to London Charing Cross via Ashford International and Tonbridge to the west and Ramsgate via Dover Priory to the east.

The western end of the Channel Tunnel is at Cheriton, just west of Folkestone and trains that carry cars are provided by Eurotunnel. The tunnel is accessed by the M20 and the A20. Eurostar also use the tunnel but its nearest station to the district is next door in Ashford at Ashford International.

There are no longer cross channel ferry services in the district and these are now concentrated at the Port of Dover..

The Royal Military Canal starts at Seabrook, near the sea at Sandgate, and runs through Hythe town centre and the northern edge of the Romney Marsh.

The Romney, Hythe & Dymchurch Railway is a light railway that operates over almost 14 miles from Hythe to Dungeness via Dymchurch, New Romney, and some smaller intermediate stations.

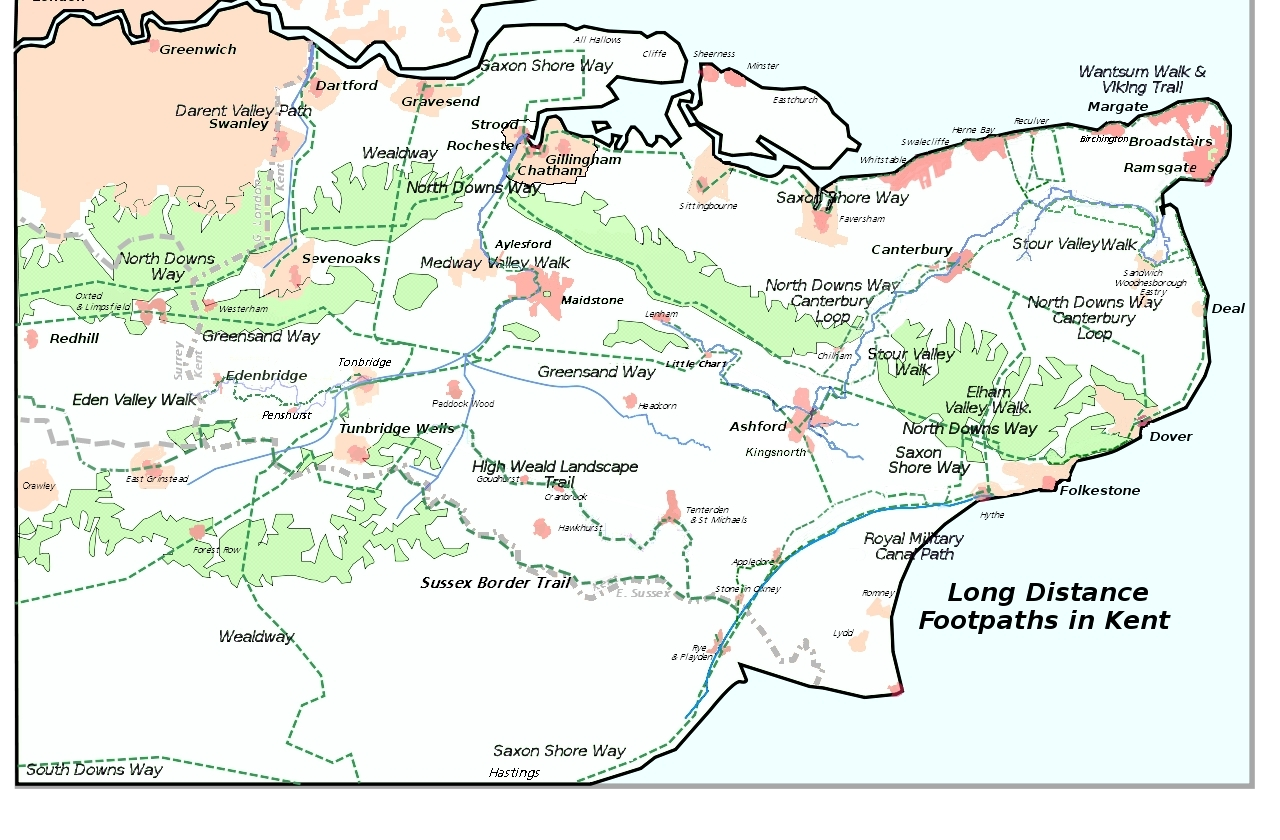
The North Downs Way, and the other Kent long-distance footpaths.

Several long distance footpaths cross the District, including the Saxon Shore Way and the North Downs Way; shorter walks include the "Elham Valley Walk" and the "Royal Military Canal Path".

Lydd Airport is also in this district which handles small passenger flights to Le Touquet in France and Cargo flights to Ostend, Belgium. The Airport is served by routes 11 and 101.

== Towns and parishes ==
The whole district is divided into civil parishes. The parish councils for Folkestone, Hawkinge, Hythe, Lydd and New Romney take the style "town council". Some of the smaller parishes have a parish meeting rather than a parish council.

- Acrise (M)
- Brenzett
- Brookland
- Burmarsh
- Dymchurch
- Elham
- Elmsted
- Ivychurch
- Lyminge
- Lympne
- Monks Horton (M)
- Newchurch
- Newington
- Old Romney (M)
- Paddlesworth (M)
- Postling
- St Mary in the Marsh
- Saltwood
- Sandgate
- Sellindge
- Snargate (M)
- Stelling Minnis
- Stowting (M)
- Stanford
- Swingfield

(M) Parishes marked thus are served by a parish meeting, not a parish council
