= Forlond =

- Forlond is a Middle English spelling of Foreland (can also refer to North Foreland and South Foreland)
