= Saxon Shore (disambiguation) =

Saxon Shore was a military command of the Late Roman Empire, encompassing southern Britain and the coasts of northern France.

Saxon Shore may also refer to:

- Saxon Shore (band), an American post-rock band
- The Saxon Shore, a 1995 novel by Jack Whyte
- Saxon Shore Way, a modern walkway in Britain
- Saxon Shore, an electoral ward within the Borough of Ashford, Kent, UK

== See also ==
- Saxon Shore forts
