= Mo Dutta =

British broadcaster

Mo Dutta (born 1971), is a television and radio presenter known for his dry sense of humour, who presented Saturday and Sunday morning shows on BBC Radio 2 from 1 July 1995 to 30 May 2009.

He has also been a familiar face on BBC1's Daytime TV. His TV work includes Big Day Out and TalkAbout, both on BBC1, Network East and Bollywood or Bust, the Hindi movie quiz show, both on BBC2, plus occasional appearances on BBC1's Countryfile.

He joined Radio 2 in 1995 when he took over the Saturday and Sunday early morning shows. They were broadcast from 6:00–8:00 a.m. on Saturday and from 4:00–7:00 a.m. on Sunday. In March 2008, his Saturday show was extended to 4:00–8:00 a.m. and he dropped the Sunday show.

Mo also briefly presented the weekend breakfast show on the BBC Asian Network and used to be a presenter at BBC Radio Kent, and before that on BBC Radio Bedfordshire and BBC GMR. He's also presented shows on 5 Live.

In his spare time he runs a number of his own business enterprises including Internet training, software design, broadcast electronics and production.

Mo announced on his BBC Radio 2 show that his last show would be on 30 May 2009. Zoe Ball took over the show early June 2009.
