= Heathfield transmitting station =

Transmitting station in East Sussex, England

Heathfield
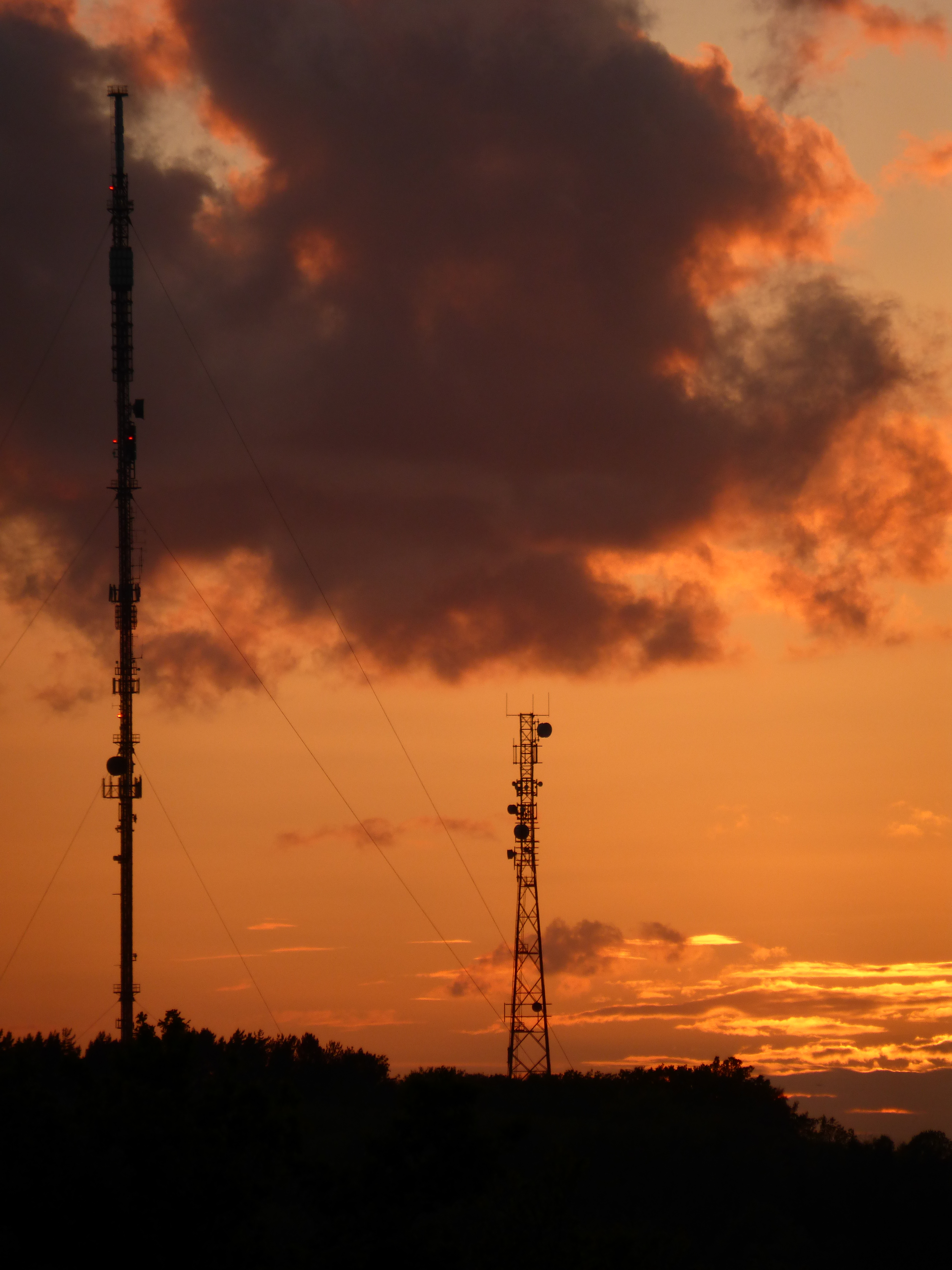

- Location in East Sussex
- Mast height: 135 metres (443 ft)
- Coordinates: 50.976667°N 0.230556°E
- Grid reference: TQ566220
- Built: 1969
- BBC region: BBC South East
- ITV region: ITV Meridian (East)

The Heathfield transmitting station is a facility for FM and television transmission at Heathfield, East Sussex, UK (grid reference TQ566220). Opened in 1969, its antenna mast is a 135 m (443 ft) tall guyed structure, giving the transmitter a height of 256 m (840 ft) above sea level. A Group B (or wideband or K group) horizontally polarised aerial is required to receive digital TV signals. The original analogue signals were in the Group C/D band, but all the digital MUXES should still be receivable on a C/D group aerial in reasonable signal areas.

The station's coverage area experiences co-channel interference problems, particularly to the south, not only with Brighton (Whitehawk Hill) but with the continent as well. It is owned and operated by Arqiva.

The transmitter broadcasts television and radio services to East Sussex and parts of West Sussex. This includes towns such as Hastings, Eastbourne, Bexhill, St Leonards-on-Sea, Heathfield, Lewes, Uckfield, Seaford, Newhaven, Peacehaven, Crowborough, Hailsham, Haywards Heath, Burgess Hill and East Grinstead.

Along with Bluebell Hill, Dover and Whitehawk Hill, Heathfield transmits regional television services from BBC One South East and ITV Meridian (east) although between 1993 and 2001 it transmitted BBC South from Southampton ensuring both East & West Sussex received the same regional news programme BBC South Today which is no longer the case.

Heathfield has 13 local relays: Bexhill, Ham Street, Haywards Heath, Hollington Park, East Dean, Eastbourne, Eastbourne (Old Town), Lamberhurst, Lewes, Mountfield, Newhaven, Sedlescombe and Wye.

== Services listed by frequency ==
=== Analogue radio ===
Frequency	kW	Service
102.4 MHz	8.2	Heart South
104.5 MHz	10	BBC Radio Sussex

=== Digital radio ===
Frequency	Block	kW	Operator
211.648	10B	1	Sussex Coast
222.064 MHz	11D	2	Digital One
225.648 MHz	12B	5	BBC National DAB

=== Digital television ===
Frequency	UHF	kW	Operator	System
626.000 MHz	40	20	SDN	DVB-T
634.000 MHz	41 (was 52)	20	BBC A	DVB-T
650.000 MHz	43	20	Arqiva A	DVB-T
658.000 MHz	44 (was 49)	20	Digital 3&4	DVB-T
674.000 MHz	46	20	Arqiva B	DVB-T
682.000 MHz	47	20	BBC B	DVB-T2

- Aerial Group: B
- Polarisation: Horizontal
- Heathfield completed 700 MHz clearance on 19 July 2018, therefore ceasing the use of UHF 49 and UHF 52.

==== Before switchover ====
Frequency	UHF	kW	Operator
538.000 MHz	29	1.6	Digital 3&4 (Mux 2)
578.000 MHz	34	1.6	BBC (Mux 1)
681.833 MHz	47-	1	BBC (Mux B)
689.833 MHz	48-	1	SDN (Mux A)
713.833 MHz	51-	1	Arqiva (Mux D)
738.000 MHz	54	1	Arqiva (Mux C)

- Aerial group: W

=== Analogue television ===
BBC2 closed on 30 May 2012. The remaining analogue services closed on 13 June 2012.

Frequency	UHF	kW	Service
695.25 MHz	49	100	BBC1 South East
719.25 MHz	52	100	BBC2 South East
815.25 MHz	64	100	Meridian
839.25 MHz	67	100	Channel 4

- Aerial group: C/D
- Polarisation: horizontal
