= Barbara Sturgeon =

British radio presenter

- Born: Kent, England
- Presenting career
- Show: The Barbara Sturgeon Show; ● News & Current Affairs Breakfast Show
- Station: BBC Radio Kent (1983–2004)
- Show: Early Weekend Breakfast
- Station: BBC Radio 2 (1992–93)
- Style: Presenter
- Country: United Kingdom

Barbara Sturgeon is a British radio presenter and winner of two Sony Radio Awards for a show she presented on BBC Radio Kent during the 1980s. Sturgeon subsequently presented an early weekend morning programme for BBC Radio 2 in 1992/93, but returned to Radio Kent subsequently, where she presented a lunchtime current affairs show until leaving the station in 2004.

== Career ==
Sturgeon's broadcasting career began in 1983 when she joined BBC Radio Medway (later BBC Radio Kent) and presented reports for the BBC from Northern Ireland during the height of the Troubles, and a Teabreak feature. She went on from this to front the Drivetime show for BBC Radio Kent, as well as a Sunday request show, before presenting her own lunchtime current affairs show, The Barbara Sturgeon Show. The programme covered a broad range of topics, from political and social issues to more light-hearted subjects, as well as human interest stories. Among topics covered on the show were a debate on the Zeebrugge Inquiry, held following the 1987 Zeebrugge ferry disaster. Sturgeon also hosted election coverage for the station.

The lunchtime show garnered Sturgeon the Sony Local Radio Personality of the Year Award in both 1987 and 1988. Her programme was then nominated for the Sony Outside Broadcast Award in 1989 which featured live coverage of a human birth and, separately, a gall bladder operation. Following the success of her lunchtime show, she later presented BBC Radio Kent's News and Current Affairs Breakfast Show. She was replaced at lunchtime by Andy Jones who had previously worked with her on production of the show. Barbara moved to BBC Radio 2 in 1992, where she spent two years presenting an early breakfast show on Saturday and Sunday mornings.

In the 1990s, Sturgeon returned to BBC Radio Kent to host another lunchtime show, following a format similar to that of her original programme. One of the topics covered on the show was that of animal welfare, and in 1998, she was awarded the RSPCA Local Media Award for this. In 2004 following twenty years with the BBC, Sturgeon left BBC Radio Kent to pursue other projects inside and outside the media.
