= 2023 Folkestone and Hythe District Council election =

2023 English local election

- 4 May 2023

All 30 seats to Folkestone and Hythe District Council 16 seats needed for a majority
- Turnout: 34.5%

	First party	Second party	Third party
Leader	Jim Martin	Connor McConville	David Monk
Party	Green	Labour	Conservative
Last election	6 seats, 25.2%	6 seats, 18.8%	13 seats, 36.4%
Seats before	6	5	11
Seats won	11	10	5
Seat change	▲5	▲4	▼8
Popular vote	20,218	13,631	18,137
Percentage	31.0%	20.9%	27.8%
Swing	▲5.8%	▲2.1%	▼8.6%
	Fourth party	Fifth party
Leader	Tim Prater
Party	Liberal Democrats	Independent
Last election	2 seats, 11.3%	1 seat, 4.0%
Seats before	3	3
Seats won	2	2
Seat change	Steady	▲1
Popular vote	7,353	4,204
Percentage	11.3%	6.4%
Swing	0.0%	▲2.4%
- A map of the winner of each seat by party in the 2023 Folkestone and Hythe District Council Election
Leader before election
David Monk
Conservative
Leader after election
Jim Martin
Green

The 2023 Folkestone and Hythe District Council election took place on 4 May 2023 to elect members of Folkestone and Hythe District Council in Kent, England. This was on the same day as other local elections in England.

== Summary ==
The Green Party won the most seats, with the Conservatives falling into third place behind Labour. The leader of the council prior to the election, Conservative councillor David Monk, lost his seat.

Following the election a coalition of the Greens and Liberal Democrats formed a minority administration, with Green councillor Jim Martin being appointed the new leader of the council at the subsequent annual council meeting on 24 May 2023.

=== Election result ===
2023 Folkestone and Hythe District Council election
Party	Candidates	Seats	Gains	Losses	Net gain/loss	Seats %	Votes %	Votes	+/−
Green	17	11	5	0	▲5	36.7	31.0	20,218	+5.8
Labour	21	10	4	0	▲4	33.3	20.9	13,631	+2.1
Conservative	30	5	1	9	▼8	16.7	27.8	18,137	–8.6
Liberal Democrats	16	2	0	0	Steady	6.7	11.3	7,353	±0.0
Independent	12	2	1	0	▲1	6.7	6.4	4,204	+2.4
Reform	3	0	0	0	Steady	0.0	1.3	823	N/A
Foundation	2	0	0	0	Steady	0.0	0.9	608	+0.3
Socialist (GB)	2	0	0	0	Steady	0.0	0.2	126	+0.1
UKIP	1	0	0	2	▼2	0.0	0.2	124	–3.4

== Ward results ==
The Statement of Persons Nominated, which details the candidates standing in each ward, was released by Folkestone and Hythe District Council following the close of nominations on 5 April 2023.

=== Broadmead ===
Broadmead
Party	Candidate	Votes	%	±%
Labour Co-op	Belinda Walker	454	39.5	+18.0
Conservative	Kieran Leigh	448	39.0	−18.0
Liberal Democrats	John Stokes	246	21.4	+4.0
Majority		6	0.5	N/A
Turnout		1,163	37.4	+5.1
Registered electors		3,106		
Rejected ballots		15	1.3	
Labour Co-op gain from Conservative		Swing	▲18.8	

=== Cheriton ===
Cheriton (3 seats)
Party	Candidate	Votes	%	±%
Green	Rebecca Shoob*	1,219	41.0	+7.0
Green	Polly Blakemore	1,078	36.3	N/A
Green	Mike Blakemore	1,018	34.3	N/A
Conservative	Dhan Gurung	691	23.3	–11.1
Liberal Democrats	Peter Gane*	690	23.2	+1.8
Labour	Paul Bingham	624	21.0	–5.6
Liberal Democrats	Roger West	610	20.5	+2.6
Conservative	Rory Love	566	19.1	–12.8
Conservative	John Collier*	556	18.7	–12.7
Labour	Jane Darling	531	17.9	–8.4
Labour	Charles Bain Smith	522	17.6	–5.7
Turnout		2,971	31.6	+4.8
Registered electors		9,405		
Rejected ballots		23	0.8	
Green hold				
Green gain from Conservative				
Green gain from Conservative				

=== East Folkestone ===
East Folkestone (3 seats)
Party	Candidate	Votes	%	±%
Labour	Jackie Meade*	1,098	53.6	+21.9
Labour	Connor McConville*	1,030	50.3	+21.9
Labour	Adrian Lockwood	962	47.0	+14.5
Green	Marianne Brett	548	26.8	+1.2
Conservative	Jeanne Brinton	477	23.3	–4.4
Conservative	Ema Deba	435	21.2	–4.3
Conservative	Sheila Reed	434	21.2	+1.1
Liberal Democrats	Danielle Anson	419	20.5	+1.8
Turnout		2,048	24.8	+1.7
Registered electors		8,262		
Rejected ballots		31	1.5	
Labour hold				
Labour hold				
Labour hold				

=== Folkestone Central ===
Folkestone Central (3 seats)
Party	Candidate	Votes	%	±%
Labour	Laura Davison*	1,211	48.4	+15.9
Labour	Abena Akuffo-Kelly	1,058	42.3	+13.6
Labour	Liz McShane	981	39.2	+11.2
Conservative	Claire Beresford	659	26.3	–5.5
Conservative	Stephen James	647	25.9	–3.6
Conservative	Dylan Jeffrey	616	24.6	–3.2
Green	Clive Hawkins	545	21.8	N/A
Liberal Democrats	Matthew Horrox	301	12.0	–9.1
Liberal Democrats	Alison Pemberton	285	11.4	–9.3
Independent	Bryan Rylands	260	10.4	–5.2
Liberal Democrats	Aston Mannerings	239	9.6	–8.9
Socialist (GB)	Max Hess	81	3.2	N/A
Turnout		2,501	30.5	+2.6
Registered electors		8,212		
Rejected ballots		45	1.8	
Labour hold				
Labour gain from Conservative				
Labour gain from Conservative				

=== Folkestone Harbour ===
Folkestone Harbour (2 seats)
Party	Candidate	Votes	%	±%
Labour	Bridget Chapman	695	47.2	+19.2
Labour	Nicola Keen*	681	46.3	+17.8
Foundation	Mary Lawes	372	25.3	–1.9
Foundation	Frank McKenna	236	16.0	N/A
Conservative	Glyn Hibbert	230	15.6	–4.7
Conservative	Richard Moffatt	210	14.3	–4.1
Liberal Democrats	Tom McNeice	198	13.5	–4.4
Liberal Democrats	Adam Rowledge	121	8.2	N/A
Socialist (GB)	Andy Thomas	45	3.1	–1.1
Turnout		1,471	30.0	+2.0
Registered electors		4,897		
Rejected ballots		20	1.4	
Labour hold				
Labour hold				

=== Hythe ===
Hythe (3 seats)
Party	Candidate	Votes	%	±%
Green	Anita Jones	2,971	67.9	+7.1
Green	Jim Martin*	2,930	66.9	+5.9
Green	Rich Holgate	2,826	64.6	+9.3
Conservative	Malcolm Dearden	989	22.6	–4.9
Conservative	David Owen	946	21.6	–4.8
Conservative	Ben Potter	888	20.3	–5.8
Reform	David Turner	440	10.1	N/A
Turnout		4,377	47.8	+1.3
Registered electors		9,165		
Rejected ballots		21	0.5	
Green hold				
Green hold				
Green hold				

=== Hythe Rural ===
Hythe Rural (2 seats)
Party	Candidate	Votes	%	±%
Green	John Wing*	1,103	59.7	+14.3
Green	Jeremy Speakman	1,055	57.1	+5.6
Conservative	John Gabris	482	26.1	–2.6
Conservative	Michael Lyons	471	25.5	–1.3
Labour	Edward Le Fanu	229	12.4	+3.2
Turnout		1,847	36.7	–1.4
Registered electors		5,030		
Rejected ballots		22	1.2	
Green hold				
Green hold				

=== New Romney ===
New Romney (2 seats)
Party	Candidate	Votes	%	±%
Independent	Paul Thomas	680	35.1	N/A
Independent	David Wimble*	653	33.7	–14.3
Conservative	Patricia Rolfe*	501	25.9	–3.1
Conservative	Laurie Glover	400	20.7	–6.4
Green	Malcolm Watkinson	317	16.4	–3.6
Labour	Paul Carey	315	16.3	–5.4
Independent	John Davies	246	12.7	N/A
Reform	Wendy Nevard	181	9.4	N/A
Liberal Democrats	Hugh Robertson-Ritchie	111	5.7	–6.3
Independent	John Houston	72	3.7	N/A
Turnout		1,935	32.7	–3.9
Registered electors		5,910		
Rejected ballots		6	0.3	
Independent gain from Conservative				
Independent hold				

=== North Downs East ===
North Downs East (3 seats)
Party	Candidate	Votes	%	±%
Green	Stephen Scoffham	1,127	38.8	+8.4
Green	James Butcher	988	34.0	+8.9
Conservative	David Godfrey*	920	31.6	–17.0
Green	Doug Wade	903	31.1	N/A
Conservative	Stuart Peall*	896	30.8	–15.4
Conservative	David Monk*	849	29.2	–15.8
Liberal Democrats	Lynne Beaumont	542	20.8	–2.2
Labour	Nicola Hayden	524	18.0	+5.3
Labour	Lucy McGirr	482	16.6	+4.1
Independent	Philip Martin*	419	14.4	N/A
Turnout		2,907	32.2	+2.9
Registered electors		9,035		
Rejected ballots		15	0.5	
Green gain from Conservative				
Green gain from Conservative				
Conservative hold				

=== North Downs West ===
North Downs West (2 seats)
Party	Candidate	Votes	%	±%
Green	Elaine Martin	932	42.7	+9.4
Conservative	Jennifer Hollingsbee*	882	40.4	+3.1
Conservative	Laszlo Dudas	704	32.2	–9.4
Labour	Senet Yohannes	521	23.9	+12.4
Liberal Democrats	Chani Sanger	510	23.4	+2.5
Reform	Gavin Braine	202	9.3	N/A
Turnout		2,183	40.6	–3.8
Registered electors		5,380		
Rejected ballots		9	0.4	
Green gain from Conservative				
Conservative hold				

=== Romney Marsh ===
Romney Marsh (2 seats)
Party	Candidate	Votes	%	±%
Conservative	Liz Grant	647	31.6	+5.7
Labour Co-op	Tony Cooper	534	26.1	+14.4
Conservative	Tony Hills*	532	26.0	+3.3
Independent	Andy Weatherhead	491	24.0	N/A
Labour	Tony Goode	481	23.5	+10.8
Independent	Ian Meyers*	451	22.1	−12.8
Green	Jenni Hawkins	357	17.5	−5.2
Liberal Democrats	Neil Matthews	161	7.9	−3.3
Independent	Douglas Young	60	2.9	N/A
Turnout		2,045	34.4	–5.4
Registered electors		5,938		
Rejected ballots		14	0.7	
Conservative gain from UKIP				
Labour Co-op gain from UKIP				

=== Sandgate and West Folkestone ===
Sandgate and West Folkestone (2 seats)
Party	Candidate	Votes	%	±%
Liberal Democrats	Tim Prater*	1,408	74.6	+19.8
Liberal Democrats	Gary Fuller*	1,190	63.1	+15.0
Labour	Sarah Danby	316	16.7	+2.8
Conservative	Paul Jones	314	16.6	−11.2
Conservative	Dylan Moody	261	13.8	−13.1
Turnout		1887	42.6	+3.6
Registered electors		4,434		
Rejected ballots		13	0.7	
Liberal Democrats hold				
Liberal Democrats hold				

=== Walland and Denge Marsh ===
Walland and Denge Marsh (2 seats)
Party	Candidate	Votes	%	±%
Conservative	Clive Goddard*	868	44.1	−0.1
Conservative	Alan Martin	618	31.4	−11.7
Independent	Peter Webb	406	20.6	−2.7
Labour	Chrissie Cooper	382	19.4	+6.6
Liberal Democrats	Suzanne Piper	322	16.4	+0.3
Green	Ross Carter	301	15.3	−4.9
Independent	Kim Rye	269	13.7	N/A
Independent	Jack Glass	197	10.0	N/A
UKIP	Leonard Laws	124	6.3	−17.0
Turnout		1,968	32.1	+1.1
Registered electors		6,133		
Rejected ballots		16	0.8	
Conservative hold				
Conservative hold				

== Changes 2023–2027 ==
Several councillors changed party affiliation during the term:

- Labour councillor Connor McConville (East Folkestone), the party's group leader, left Labour on 18 February 2025 to join the council's newly formed Liberal Democrat and Independent group.
- Independent councillor David Wimble (New Romney) joined Reform UK; the precise date is not established, but he was already representing the party by the time he was elected to Kent County Council for Romney Marsh division on 1 May 2025.
- Labour councillor Bridget Chapman (Folkestone Harbour) left the party to sit as an independent; the date and reason have not been established.

=== By-elections ===
==== Romney Marsh ====
The by-election was triggered by the resignation of Conservative councillor Liz Grant.

Romney Marsh by-election, 22 February 2024
Party	Candidate	Votes	%	±%
Conservative	Tony Hills*	375	24.1	−1.9
Green	Malcolm Watkinson	332	21.4	+3.9
Reform	Kim Rye	237	15.2	N/A
Labour Co-op	Chrissie Cooper	295	19.0	−7.1
Independent	Paul Peacock	155	10.0	−14.0
Independent	Dave Evans	62	4.0	+1.1
Independent	Ian Meyers	51	3.3	−18.8
Liberal Democrats	Matt Horrox	11	0.7	−7.2
Independent	Dougie Young	31	2.0	N/A
Majority		43	2.8	N/A
Turnout		1,555	26.5	−7.9
Registered electors		5,864		
Rejected ballots		6	0.4	
Conservative hold				
