= South Foreland =

Chalk headland on the Kent coast of southeast England

Coordinates: 51°8′37″N 1°22′25″E

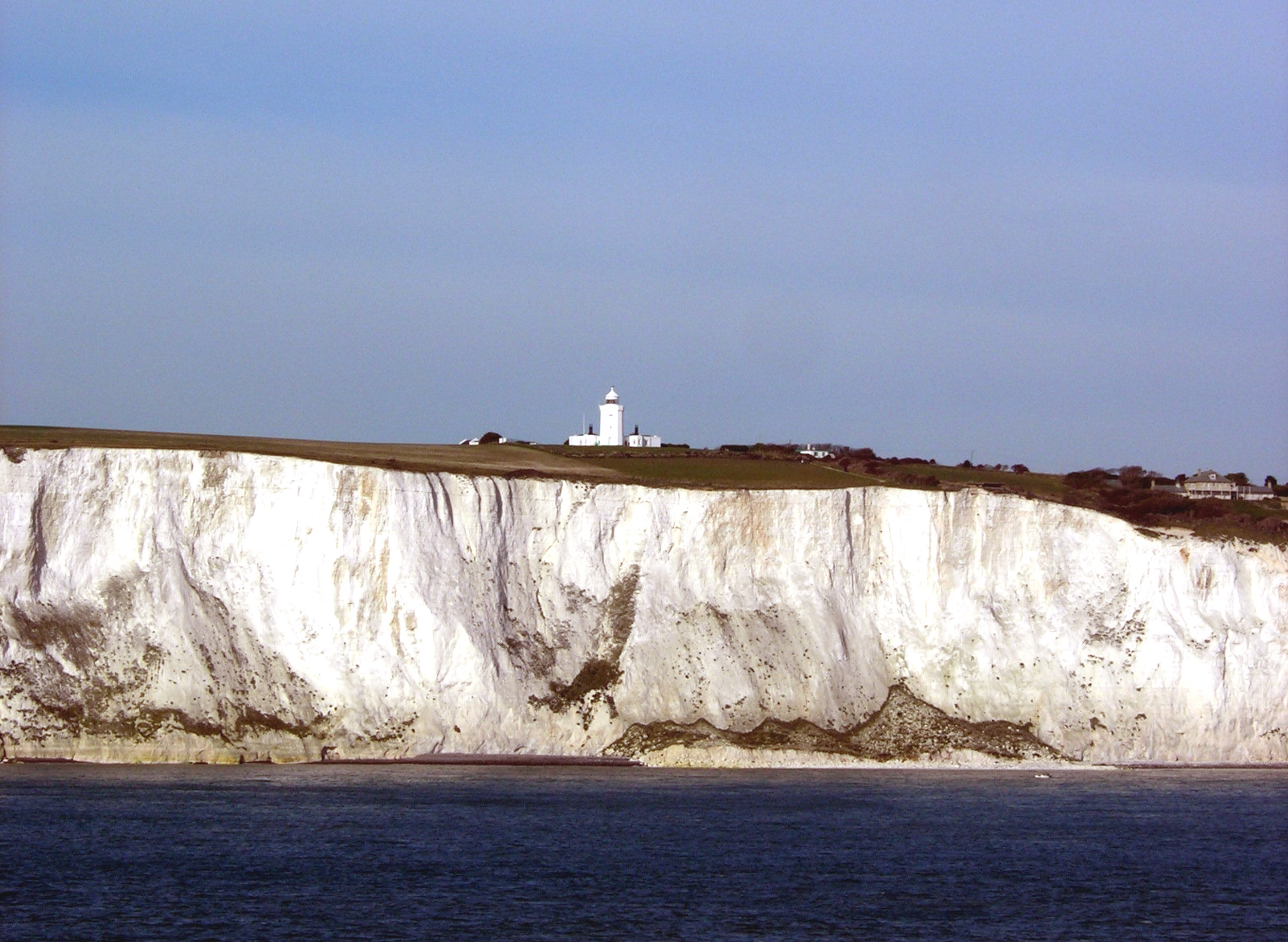
South Foreland lighthouse seen from the sea

South Foreland is a chalk headland on the Kent coast of southeast England. It presents a bold cliff to the sea, and offers views across the Strait of Dover. It is centred 3 miles (4.8 km) northeast of Dover and 15 miles (24 km) south of North Foreland. It includes the closest point on the Island of Britain to the European mainland at a distance of 20.6 miles (33.2 km).

This proximity gives it military significance and during the Second World War its coastal battery was built, along with a radar station. Lying between the busy Port of Dover and the remote and hazardous Goodwin Sands sandbank, its two lighthouses were important for navigation before their disuse. Much of the area is now owned by the National Trust and is open to the public; it is traversed by the Saxon Shore Way, the Kent coastal walk.

LB&SCR H2 class 4-4-2 no. 421 (later no. B421, 2421, and 32421) was named South Foreland after this landmark.

== Lighthouses ==
Two lighthouses are on South Foreland: the lower light disused since 1910 and the upper light, a National Trust asset, disused since 1988.

== Geography and geology ==
South Foreland marks the south-western limit of St Margaret's Bay (named after the village of St Margaret's at Cliffe). It is the geological counterpart of Cap Blanc Nez (lit. Cape White Nose), at the northern extremity of the Boulonnais in the French département of Pas-de-Calais. The two are the landward ends of the fiercely cleft Strait of Dover land bridge and their chalk geological stratum dictates the route of the Channel Tunnel. Geologists have theorised that much of the erosion was river erosion from the extended Rhine and numerous southern North Sea channels discharging through the Strait of Dover.

== Second World War ==
During the Second World War South Foreland carried a Chain Home radar station similar to the still-extant towers at Swingate, east of Dover.

=== South Foreland battery ===
This was a coastal artillery battery with four Mark X 9.2 inch guns and a network of bunkers and ammunition stores, northeast of the lighthouse on the road to St Margaret's. The site was cleared after World War II leaving traces, although since these have become heavily overgrown. The heavily reinforced positions were hewn into the cliff in the three months from 28 December 1940. The first gun arrived on 25 March 1941. No. 4 gun was test fired on 28 November 1941. On 12 February 1942, the light battleships Gneisenau, Scharnhorst and the heavy cruiser Prinz Eugen attempted the Channel Dash from Brest, France to Germany. The Foreland's K-band radar started to track the ships of the Brest Group coming up the Channel towards Cap Gris Nez. At 12:19, the first salvo was fired; maximum visibility was five miles, there was no observation of fall of shot by sight. The blips of the radar showed zig-zagging of the ships prompting full battery salvo firing. 33 rounds were fired at the German ships, which were moving out of range at 30 kn (35 mph; 56 km/h). The Germans revealed that all had missed.

By the end of the war the four guns had fired 2,248 shells, most in the months before and after the Normandy landings. 28 enemy ships were sunk by the coastal batteries around Dover, which loss deterred use of the Channel Dash by the German surface fleet.

== See also ==
- St Margaret's Bay Windmill is just east of the lighthouse
