= Davison's Mill, Stelling Minnis =

Windmill in Kent, England

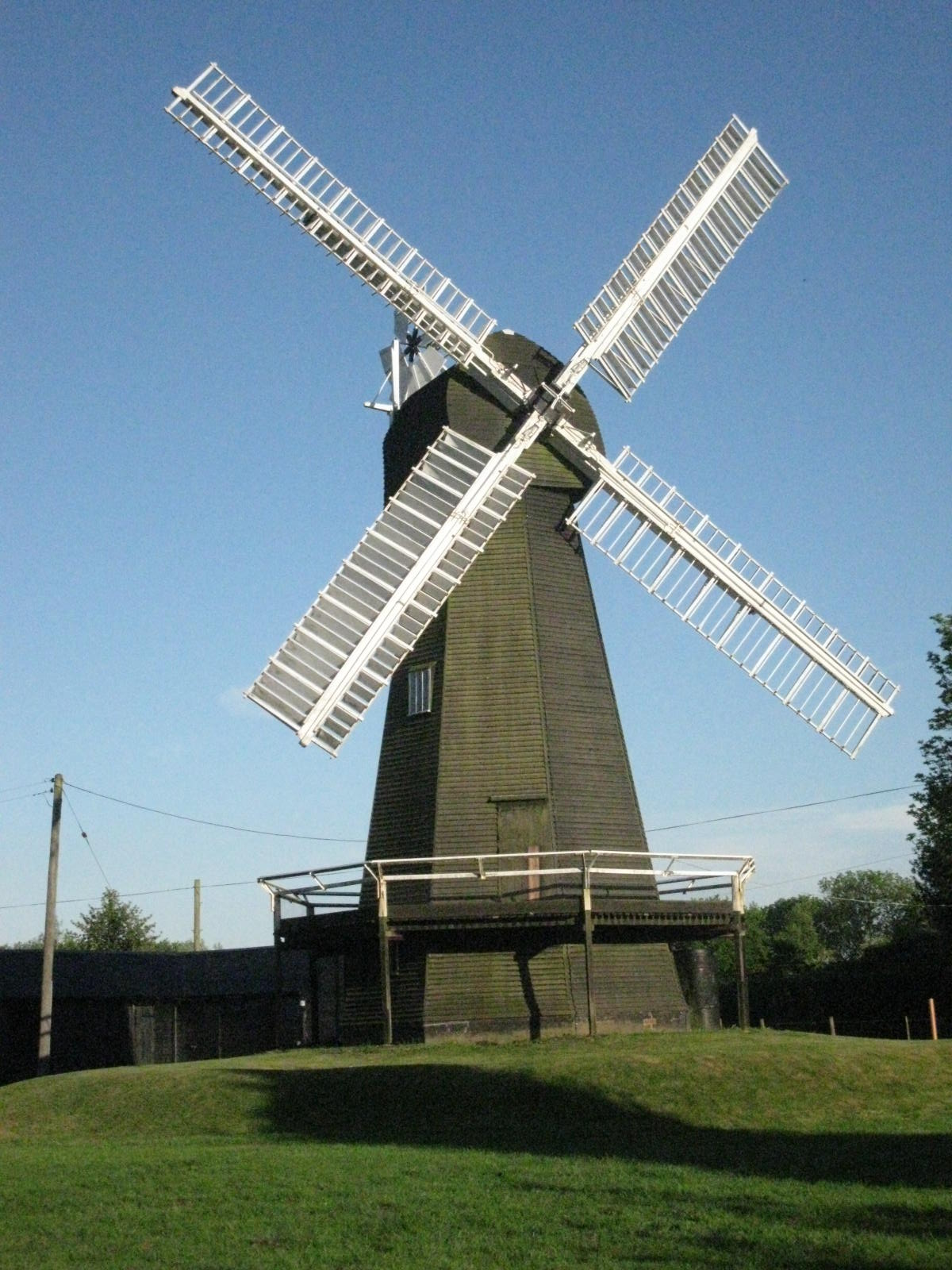
- Davison's Mill, May 2010
- Interactive map of Davison's Mill, Stelling Minnis

Origin
- Mill name: Davison's Mill
- Grid reference: TR 146 466
- Coordinates: 51°10′38″N 1°04′09″E
- Operator: Kent County Council
- Year built: 1866

Information
- Purpose: Corn mill
- Type: Smock mill
- Storeys: Four-storey smock
- Base storeys: Low brick base of a few courses
- Smock sides: Eight-sided
- No. of sails: Four
- Type of sails: Double Patent sails
- Windshaft: Cast iron
- Winding: Fantail
- Fantail blades: Six bladed
- Auxiliary power: Hornsby hot-bulb oil engine since 1923
- No. of pairs of millstones: Two pairs
- Other information: Was last commercially working windmill in Kent. Has the only surviving original hot-bulb auxiliary engine in any windmill in the United Kingdom

Davison's Mill, also known as Stelling Minnis Windmill, is a Grade I listed smock mill in Stelling Minnis, Kent, England that was built in 1866. It was the last windmill working commercially in Kent when it closed in the autumn of 1970.

The mill is managed by the Stelling Minnis Windmill and Museum Trust, which came into being on 26 January 2010. It is open to visitors each year from Easter Sunday to the end of September on Sundays and Bank Holidays, from 2 p.m. to 5 p.m. Its grounds host the annual Stelling Minnis fete.

== History ==
Davison's Mill was built in 1866 by the Canterbury millwright Thomas Holman, replacing an earlier open trestle post mill with common sails. Milling by wind ceased in 1925, but the mill continued to work by a Ruston & Hornsby oil engine which had been added in 1923. In April 1935, the mill was restored to full working order. The work was financed by H Laurie, as a memorial to her brother Colonel Ronald Macdonald Laurie, who had died on 21 October 1927. Laurie was awarded a Windmill Certificate by the Society for the Protection of Ancient Buildings in 1936. One pair of sails was blown off in the early 1950s, and the mill worked afterwards with a single pair, assisted by the engine. Elham Rural District Council donated £100 towards the cost of repairs estimated at £500 in the 1950s. When Alec Davison retired in the autumn of 1970, the mill was the last in Kent working commercially by wind. After the death of Mr Davison, the mill was acquired by Kent County Council. A restoration of the mill commenced in 2003, with the sails being taken down on 19 July and the cap removed on 20 July. The work was financed by the Heritage Lottery Fund and Kent County Council. It was carried out by IJP Millwrights of Binfield Heath, Berkshire and took three months to complete.

== Description ==
Davison's Mill is a four-storey smock mill with a stage at first-floor level. It is built on a low brick base only 14 inches (360 mm) high. The mill is 43 feet (13.11 m) tall to the top of the cap. It has four patent sails carried on a cast-iron windshaft. The mill is winded by a fantail. The mill drives two pairs of millstones underdrift. The Brake wheel is iron. This drives a cast-iron Wallower. The Great Spur Wheel is also of cast iron.

The engine is a Ruston & Hornsby "1912" hot-bulb engine, which was despatched from Holman's in Canterbury on 7 May 1923.

== Millers ==
- Colver (post mill)
- George Goble 1866 – 1878
- Henry William Davison 1878 –
- Alec Davison 1940 – 1970

References for above:-
