= Swingate transmitting station =

Transmitter station in Kent, England

Swingate
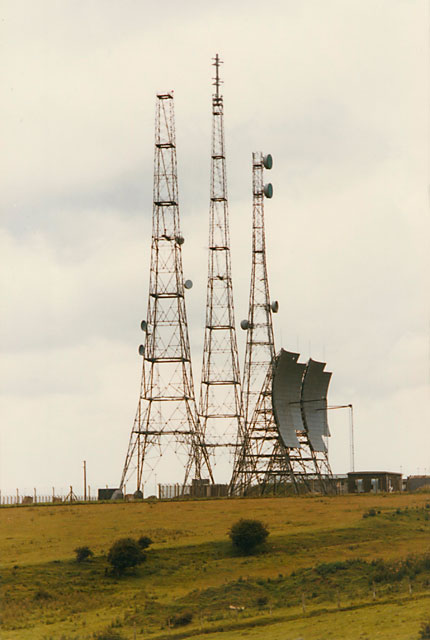
- The three Swingate towers

- Location within Kent
- Location: Swingate, Kent
- Tower height: 111 metres (364 ft)
- Coordinates: 51.137778°N 1.335833°E
- Grid reference: TR334429
- Demolished: 2010 (South tower)

The Swingate transmitting station is a facility for FM and DAB radio transmission in the village of Swingate, near Dover, Kent (grid reference TR334429). For many years there were four lattice towers with a height of 111 metres (364 ft). This station was one of the first 5 Chain Home Radar stations completed in 1936 and was originally designated AMES (Air Ministry Experimental Station) 04 Dover. The broadcast transmitting antennas are attached to what was the middle tower; microwave link dishes and mobile telephone antennas were spread across all three towers. The south tower was dismantled in March 2010, as a result, only two remain.

The Swingate towers no longer have the three cantilever platforms that were fitted originally.

== History ==
Originally there were four towers with wires stretched between them to transmit radio waves that were detected by a group of four smaller towers to the east of the surviving ones. The receiver towers were demolished after the war, along with one of the transmitter towers. Subsequently the north mast was demolished and replaced with a similar tower with a different bracing design. During the Cold War the towers sprouted four transmitters at their base which were popularly assumed to be part of the US ACE High communication system but were more likely an RAF link to Germany. The south tower was dismantled in March 2010.

=== Timeline ===
In 1936, four towers with platforms were erected. In 1955 one tower was dismantled, leaving three standing. In 1991 the north tower was replaced by a shorter one. In 2010 the south tower was dismantled.

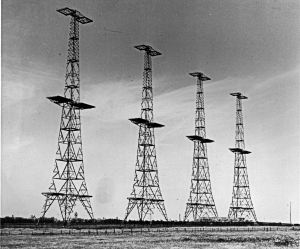
Four towers with platforms, 1936

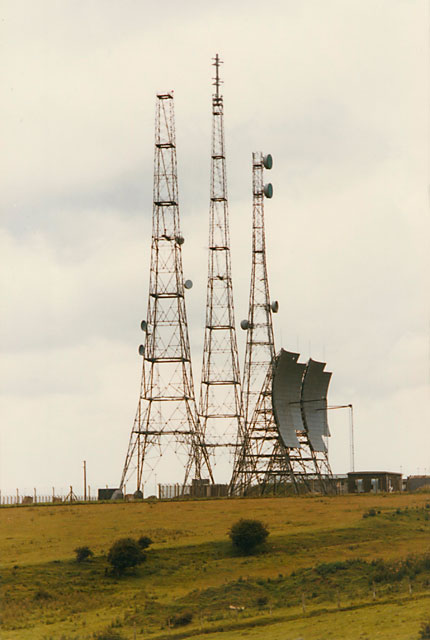
Three towers plus Cold War installation, 1982

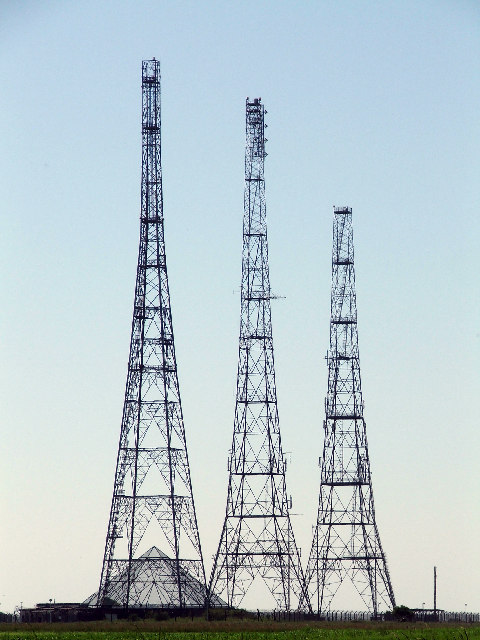
Two of the original towers plus a newer, shorter one, 2005

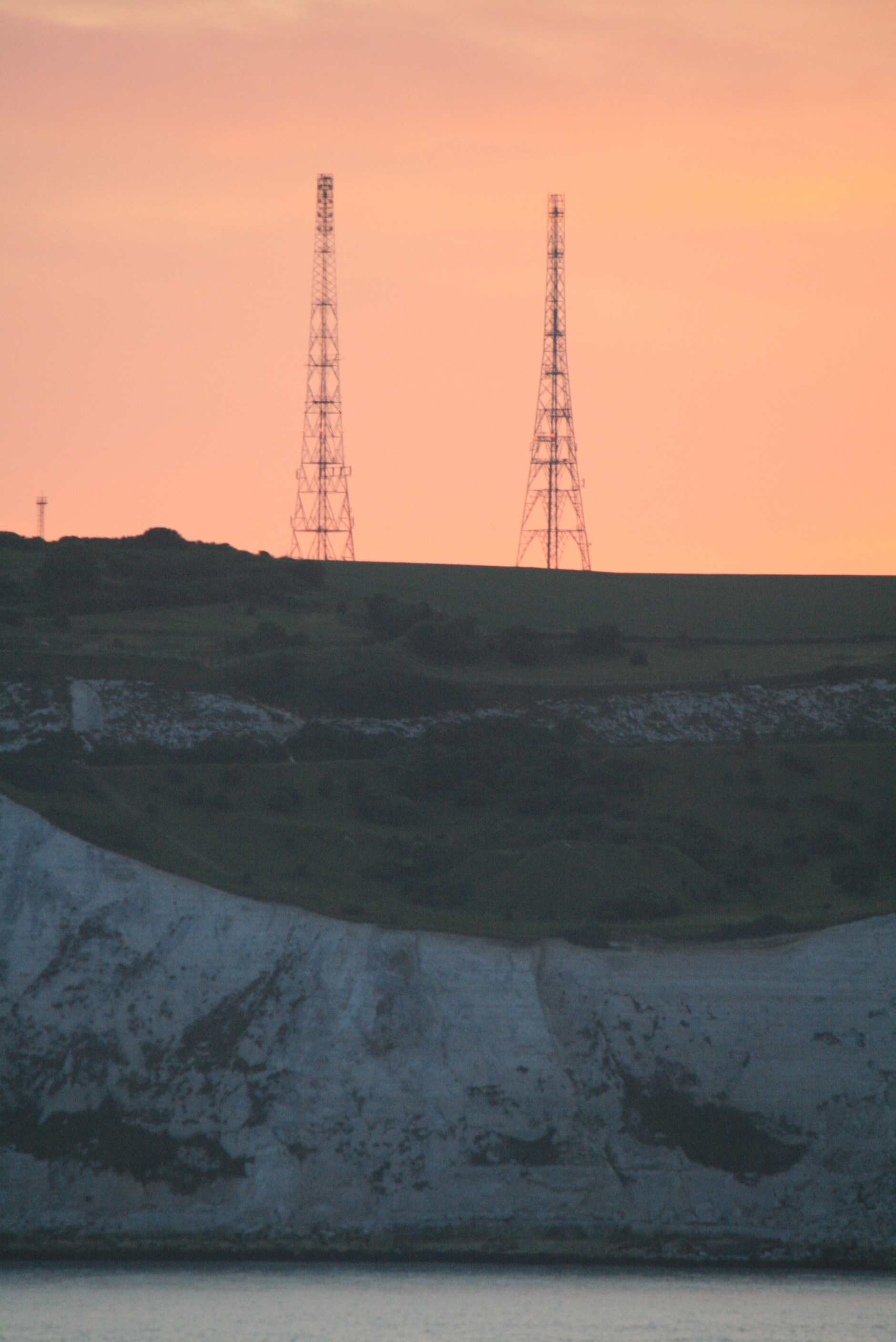
Two remaining towers, 2011

== Channels available from this site ==
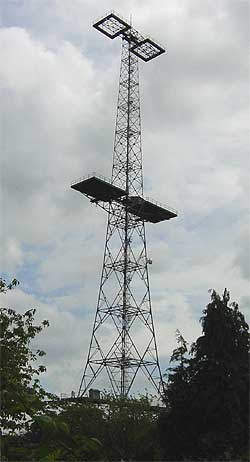
Tower with platforms at Great Baddow in Essex, the only Chain Home radar tower to retain the original platforms.

=== High Frequency Trading ===
Several of the microwave dishes located on one of the towers provide connections via a chain of towers between the NYSE Euronext data centres in Basildon and Slough, and Frankfurt for use in High Frequency Trading. Microwave links have lower latency (delay) than other communications systems.

=== Analogue radio ===
The transmitter is the main transmission station for the BBC which serves the bulk of Kent.

Frequency	kW	Service
90.0 MHz	11	BBC Radio 2
92.4 MHz	11	BBC Radio 3
94.4 MHz	11	BBC Radio 4
99.5 MHz	11	BBC Radio 1
104.2 MHz	10	BBC Radio Kent

== See also ==
- Dover transmitting station - broadcasts TV, DAB and commercial FM radio from a site west of the town
