= BBC South East =

English region of the British broadcaster

- BBC South East's area within the UK
- TV stations: BBC One
- TV transmitters: Bluebell Hill; Dover; Heathfield; Whitehawk Hill
- Radio stations: BBC Radio Kent; BBC Radio Surrey; BBC Radio Sussex
- Headquarters: The Great Hall, 16 Mount Pleasant Rd, Tunbridge Wells TN1 1QU
- Area: Kent; East Sussex; West Sussex (Adur, Crawley, Mid Sussex and Worthing); Surrey (Reigate and Banstead, Tandridge)
- Regions: South East
- Key people: Quentin Smith, Ben Moore
- Launch date: September 2001
- Freesat/Sky: 984

BBC South East is the BBC English region serving Kent, East Sussex (including the City of Brighton and Hove), parts of West Sussex and Surrey.

The BBC region was created in September 2001 by the joining of the Heathfield transmitter (formerly part of the BBC South region) with the Bluebell Hill and Dover transmitters (from the then BBC London and South East region) to form a new regional TV service. Unlike ITV Meridian (East), it does not provide local news for southern Essex (received from a Bluebell Hill overlap), this area being part of the BBC London region instead.

== Services ==
=== Television ===
BBC South East's television output consists of the flagship regional news service South East Today and its main programme is broadcast weeknights at 6:30 pm, with short bulletins throughout the day and during the weekend. A half-hour opt-out during Sunday Politics is produced by an independent production company. In 2020, South East Today joined forces with BBC London News during the COVID-19 pandemic to keep viewers in both regions informed with the developments about the virus in their areas, although it didn't affect their separate main evening programmes. The joint venture happened again in January 2021.

BBC South East covers Kent, East Sussex and parts of West Sussex and Surrey.

Due to the size of Surrey, the listenership of BBC Radio Surrey is covered by both BBC London, BBC South and BBC South East.

=== Radio ===
The region is the controlling centre for BBC Radio Kent, BBC Radio Surrey and BBC Radio Sussex.

Radio Kent carries local programming between 6 am and 7 pm from the Tunbridge Wells studio, then simulcasts networked programming along with stations in the BBC South and South East regions until 1 am every night. Radio Sussex and Radio Surrey each carry three hours a day of local programming for each county from 6 am to 9 am, sharing the remainder of their output between 9 am and 7 pm, then joining with other stations in the BBC South and BBC South East regions at 7 pm.

=== Online and interactive ===
BBC South East also produces regional news and local radio pages for BBC Red Button and BBC Local websites for each county. It also provided regional information for the BBC Ceefax service until its closure in October 2012.

== History ==
Prior to 2001, London, and the whole of the South East had been considered part of the same editorial region by the BBC, and as a result, received a single regional service, including news programmes BBC London Plus (1984–1989) and Newsroom South East (1989–2001). London had not been afforded the same 'regional' status as the other BBC regions as the bulk of the national content was produced in the capital. This was reflected in the fact that since the launch of regional TV news bulletins in 1957, there was no specialist division within the BBC tasked with producing South East opt-outs.

As a result, the region had fewer local bulletins. Town and Around, the BBC's first attempt at a South East news programme, was gradually integrated into Nationwide, whose production team produced the local bulletins, presented for many years by Bob Wellings. This issue was addressed to a degree with the launch of South East at Six on Monday 4 January 1982 and later, on Monday 3 September 1984, by London Plus – which saw the introduction of short daytime bulletins of the type seen in other BBC regions. Production teams based within the BBC's Current Affairs department continued to produce London Plus until a dedicated South East operation was finally introduced on Tuesday 28 March 1989 with the launch of Newsroom South East from a dedicated news centre at the BBC Elstree Centre in Hertfordshire. Despite the changes throughout the decade, the large region and fewer regional operatives meant the service was still far from ideal.

The size of the region was gradually reduced in stages, starting in 1993 when the Heathfield transmitter serving East Sussex was switched from BBC South East to BBC South. On 16 October 2000, the areas served by the Oxford transmitter were transferred from BBC South East to a new opt out service from BBC South's South Today. This service was concluded on financial grounds in December 2022.

Following the BBC's South East Review of 2001, the London and South East arrangements changed, with BBC London split off as a separate entity and Heathfield viewers rejoining Bluebell Hill and Dover in a new smaller BBC South East region, launched on Monday 3 September 2001 and based in Royal Tunbridge Wells.

Following digital switchover in the south on 7 March 2012, the Whitehawk Hill transmitter in Brighton transferred from the BBC South region to BBC South East. The network had been broadcasting around the fringes of Brighton and Hove prior to switchover and has always been part of the region's remit since 2001; BBC South East now broadcasts terrestrially to the whole city extending along the coast into West Sussex as far as Worthing.

== Studios ==
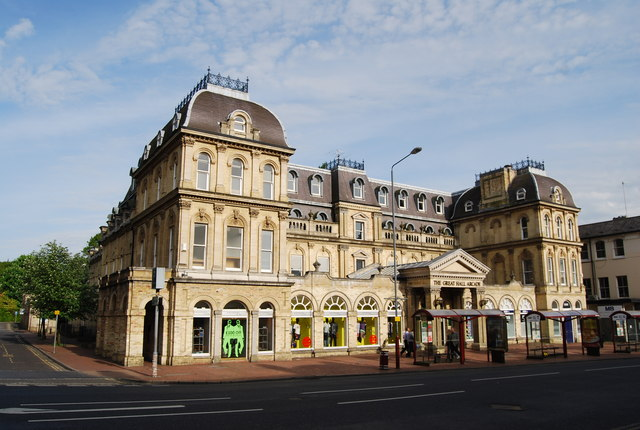
The Great Hall, Tunbridge Wells

The regional broadcasting centre is based in Tunbridge Wells, Kent with local radio studios and television bureaux located in Brighton and Guildford. BBC South East is the only one of the BBC regions not based in a major city.

The Tunbridge Wells studios are located in The Great Hall, a historic building previously used as public rooms, photography studios, a performance venue, a cinema, a dancing school and until 1980, a nightclub called Carriages. In 1980, the building was severely damaged by fire. It was renovated and bought and now contains an arcade of shops, a hidden car park and the headquarters of BBC South East and BBC Radio Kent. The studios, as is now the trend with most modern developments, can be viewed by the public through tours or through the display windows into the offices from the public areas. Until late 2015, the complex contained a BBC Shop.

== See also ==
- BBC Radio Kent
- BBC Radio Sussex
- BBC Radio Surrey
- BBC Radio London
