= BBC Radio Kent =

Coordinates: 51.130235°N 0.263537°E

- Royal Tunbridge Wells; England
- Broadcast area: Kent
- Frequencies: FM: 96.7 MHz (Medway, Maidstone, North and West Kent); FM: 97.6 MHz (Folkestone); FM: 104.2 MHz (Canterbury and East Kent); DAB: 11C; Freeview: 711
- RDS: BBC Kent

Programming
- Language: English
- Format: Local news, talk and music

Ownership
- Owner: BBC Local Radio, BBC South East

History
- First air date: 18 December 1970
- Former names: BBC Radio Medway (1970–1983)
- Former frequencies: 774 MW; 1035 MW; 1602 MW

Technical information
- Licensing authority: Ofcom

Links
- Website: BBC Radio Kent

BBC Radio Kent is the BBC's local radio station serving the county of Kent.

It broadcasts on FM, DAB, digital TV and via BBC Sounds from studios at The Great Hall in Royal Tunbridge Wells.

According to RAJAR, the station has a weekly audience of 136,000 listeners as of May 2025.

== History ==
The radio station was launched in 1970 as BBC Radio Medway, originally only serving the Medway Towns. It broadcast from studios at 30 High Street in Chatham a former newspaper office which was subsequently named Media House. The station became well known in the early 1980s for its early Friday evening soul music show presented by DJ Dave Brown, becoming one of the most listened to soul shows in the UK before DJ Robbie Vincent earned that achievement with the national broadcaster BBC Radio 1 in 1983.

The station gained its current name on 2 July 1983 when operations expanded to cover all of Kent as part of the BBC's policy of operating countywide stations. Radio Medway was closed down by long serving staff member Rod Lucas, who was also the first voice to be heard on the new BBC Radio Kent.

In July 1986, the studios moved to the nearby Sun Pier, from where it broadcast in stereo for the first time.

On 18 March 1994, BBC Radio Kent stopped broadcasting on 1035 kHz MW due to the frequency being reallocated to a new London-wide commercial radio station, and then in January 2018, 774 and 1602 kHz stopped broadcasting in order to make cost savings.

In 2001, the station moved to The Great Hall in Royal Tunbridge Wells, to combine with new television studios for the BBC South East region covering Kent and Sussex. From here, BBC Radio Kent operates a total of five studios – two for programmes, one for news bulletins, one network contributions area, and a comprehensive live performance area. Since gaining the live performance area, live music has played an increasingly important part of the station's output. The music studio is in use daily as part of the evening arts strand "The Dominic King Show".

In 2015, under the direction of a new Station Managing Editor, the station created a comprehensive Station Imaging Creative Department. Organised more along the lines of a commercial stations Creative Department, it is responsible for trails, idents and jingles. The three person department also undertook creative imaging for shared programmes originating from Tunbridge Wells, as well as providing trails for other stations in the South East cluster. Other Local BBC Radio usually has a single Station Sound producer, not a whole department.

BBC Radio Kent also operated a studio and office in The Wendy House (a building close to the original Sun Pier site in Chatham), although this has since closed, and small contributions studios in Dover and Canterbury.

== Technical ==
BBC Radio Kent broadcasts on 96.7 FM for North and West Kent from the Wrotham transmitting station on the North Downs, close to the village of Wrotham, 97.6 FM for Folkestone and surrounding areas from the Creteway Down transmitting station situated north east of the town and 104.2 FM from the Swingate transmitting station located at the village of Swingate, near Dover covering Canterbury, south and east Kent. It also broadcast on DAB.

The station also broadcasts on Freeview TV channel 711 in the BBC South East region and streams online via BBC Sounds.

== Programming ==
Local programming airs from the BBC's Tunbridge Wells studios from 6 am to 2 pm on weekdays and for sports coverage.

Off-peak programming, including the weekday late show from 10 pm to 1 am, originates from BBC Radio Solent in Southampton, BBC Radio Manchester and BBC Radio London.

During the station's downtime, BBC Radio Kent simulcasts overnight programming from BBC Radio 5 Live.

== Presenters ==
=== Notable former presenters ===
- Dave Cash (1999–2016)
- Don Durbridge (1983–1992)
- Mo Dutta (1991–1994)
- Alex Lester (2017, now at Greatest Hits Radio)
- Jimmy Mack (1970–1983)
- Richard Spendlove (1989–2017)
- Barbara Sturgeon (1983–2004)
- Rod Lucas (1971 - 1979) - (1981 - 1987)
