= List of electoral wards in Kent =

This is a list of electoral divisions and wards in the ceremonial county of Kent in South East England. All changes since the re-organisation of local government following the passing of the Local Government Act 1972 are shown. The number of councillors elected for each electoral division or ward is shown in brackets.

== County council ==
=== Kent ===
Electoral Divisions from 1 April 1974 (first election 12 April 1973) to 7 May 1981:

1. Ashford No. 1 (1)
2. Ashford No. 2 (South East) (1)
3. Ashford No. 3 (South) (1)
4. Bridge-Blean No. 1 (1)
5. Bridge-Blean No. 2 (1)
6. Broadstairs & St Peters No. 1 (1)
7. Broadstairs & St Peters No. 2 (1)
8. Canterbury (2)
9. Chatham No. 1 (Luton) (1)
10. Chatham No. 2 (St Johns) (1)
11. Chatham No. 3 (Christchurch) (1)
12. Chatham No. 4 (1)
13. Cranbrook (1)
14. Dartford No. 1 (Priory) (1)
15. Dartford No. 2 (1)
16. Dartford No. 3 (1)
17. Dartford Rural No. 1 (1)
18. Dartford Rural No. 2 (1)
19. Dartford Rural No. 3 (1)
20. Dartford Rural No. 4 (1)
21. Deal No. 1 (1)
22. Deal No. 2 (1)
23. Dover No. 1 (River) (1)
24. Dover No. 2 (1)
25. Dover No. 3 (1)
26. Dover Rural (1)
27. East Ashford (1)
28. Eastry South (1)
29. Elham (1)
30. Faversham (1)
31. Folkestone No. 1 (1)
32. Folkestone No. 2 (1)
33. Folkestone No. 3 (1)
34. Gillingham No. 1 (1)
35. Gillingham No. 2 (1)
36. Gillingham No. 3 (1)
37. Gillingham No. 4 (1)
38. Gillingham No. 5 (1)
39. Gillingham No. 6 (1)
40. Gravesend No. 1 (1)
41. Gravesend No. 2 (1)
42. Gravesend No. 3 (1)
43. Gravesend No. 4 (1)
44. Herne Bay No. 1 (1)
45. Herne Bay No. 2 (1)
46. Hollingbourn No. 1 (1)
47. Hollingbourn No. 2 (1)
48. Hythe (1)
49. Maidstone No. 1 (1)
50. Maidstone No. 2 (1)
51. Maidstone No. 3 (1)
52. Maidstone No. 4 (1)
53. Maidstone No. 5 (1)
54. Maidstone Rural No. 1 (1)
55. Maidstone Rural No. 2 (1)
56. Malling No. 1 (1)
57. Malling No. 2 (1)
58. Malling No. 3 (1)
59. Malling No. 4 (1)
60. Margate No. 1 (1)
61. Margate No. 2 (1)
62. Margate No. 3 (1)
63. Margate No. 4 (1)
64. Northfleet No. 1 (1)
65. Northfleet No. 2 (1)
66. Ramsgate No. 1 (1)
67. Ramsgate No. 2 (1)
68. Ramsgate No. 3 (1)
69. Rochester No. 1 (1)
70. Rochester No. 2 (2)
71. Rochester No. 3 (1)
72. Rochester No. 4 (1)
73. Romney Marsh (1)
74. Royal Tunbridge Wells No. 1 (2)
75. Royal Tunbridge Wells No. 2 (2)
76. Sandwich (1)
77. Sevenoaks No. 1 (1)
78. Sevenoaks No. 2 (1)
79. Sevenoaks Rural No. 1 (1)
80. Sevenoaks Rural No. 2 (1)
81. Sevenoaks Rural No. 3 (1)
82. Sheerness (1)
83. Sheppey (1)
84. Sittingbourne & Milton No. 1 (1)
85. Sittingbourne & Milton No. 2 (1)
86. Southborough (1)
87. Strood Rural No. 1 (1)
88. Strood Rural No. 2 (1)
89. Swale East (1)
90. Swale West (1)
91. Swanscombe & Stone (1)
92. Tenterden (1)
93. Tonbridge No. 1 (1)
94. Tonbridge No. 2 (1)
95. Tonbridge No. 3 (1)
96. Tonbridge Rural (1)
97. West Ashford (1)
98. Whitstable No. 1 (1)
99. Whitstable No. 2 (1)

Electoral Divisions from 7 May 1981 to 5 May 2005:

1. Ashford North (1)
2. Ashford Rural East (1)
3. Ashford Rural West (1)
4. Ashford South (1)
5. Ashford South East (1)
6. Birchington & Parishes (1)
7. Broadstairs North (1)
8. Broadstairs South (1)
9. Canterbury Central (1)
10. Canterbury East (1)
11. Canterbury North (1)
12. Canterbury South (1)
13. Cranbrook (1)
14. Darent Valley (1)
15. Dartford North (1) †
16. Dartford South East (1) †
17. Dartford South West (1) †
18. Dartford West (1) †
19. Deal East (1)
20. Deal West (1)
21. Dover Central (1)
22. Dover Rural (1)
23. Dover South (1)
24. Dover West (1)
25. Elham Valley (1)
26. Faversham (1)
27. Folkestone North (1)
28. Folkestone South (1)
29. Folkestone West (1)
30. Gillingham North Central (1); electoral division abolished in 1998
31. Gillingham North East (1); electoral division abolished in 1998
32. Gillingham North West (1); electoral division abolished in 1998
33. Gillingham South Central (1); electoral division abolished in 1998
34. Gillingham South East (1); electoral division abolished in 1998
35. Gillingham South West (1); electoral division abolished in 1998
36. Gravesend East (1)
37. Gravesend North (1)
38. Gravesend South (1)
39. Gravesham Rural (1)
40. Herne Bay East (1)
41. Herne Bay West (1)
42. Hythe (1)
43. Maidstone Central (1)
44. Maidstone North East (1)
45. Maidstone Rural East (1)
46. Maidstone Rural North (1)
47. Maidstone Rural South (1)
48. Maidstone Rural West (1)
49. Maidstone South East (1)
50. Maidstone South West (1)
51. Maidstone West (1)
52. Malling Rural Central (1)
53. Malling Rural North (1)
54. Malling Rural North East (1)
55. Malling Rural West (1)
56. Margate Central (1)
57. Margate East (1)
58. Margate West (1)
59. Medway North (1); electoral division abolished in 1998
60. Medway North Central (1); electoral division abolished in 1998
61. Medway North East (1); electoral division abolished in 1998
62. Medway North West (1); electoral division abolished in 1998
63. Medway Rural (1); electoral division abolished in 1998
64. Medway South (1); electoral division abolished in 1998
65. Medway South Central (1); electoral division abolished in 1998
66. Medway South East (1); electoral division abolished in 1998
67. Medway South West (1); electoral division abolished in 1998
68. Northfleet (1)
69. Northwood & Eastcliff (1)
70. Ramsgate North (1)
71. Ramsgate South (1)
72. Romney Marsh (1)
73. Sandwich (1)
74. Sevenoaks Central (1)
75. Sevenoaks East (1)
76. Sevenoaks North (1)
77. Sevenoaks North East (1)
78. Sevenoaks South (1)
79. Sevenoaks West (1)
80. Sheerness (1)
81. Sheppey (1)
82. Southborough (1)
83. Swale Central (1)
84. Swale East (1)
85. Swale North (1)
86. Swale West (1)
87. Swanley (1)
88. Swanscombe & Stone (1) †
89. Tenterden (1)
90. Tollgate (1)
91. Tonbridge East (1)
92. Tonbridge West (1)
93. Tunbridge Wells Central (1)
94. Tunbridge Wells East (1)
95. Tunbridge Wells Rural East (1)
96. Tunbridge Wells Rural West (1)
97. Tunbridge Wells South (1)
98. Whitstable East (1)
99. Whitstable West (1)

† minor boundary changes in 1989

Electoral Divisions from 5 May 2005 to 4 May 2017:

1. Ashford Central (1)
2. Ashford East (1)
3. Ashford Rural East (1)
4. Ashford Rural South (1)
5. Ashford Rural West (1)
6. Ashford South (1)
7. Birchington & Villages (1)
8. Broadstairs & Sir Moses Montefiore (2)
9. Canterbury City North East (1)
10. Canterbury City South West (1)
11. Canterbury South East (1)
12. Canterbury West (1)
13. Cranbrook (1)
14. Darent Valley (1)
15. Dartford East (1)
16. Dartford North East (1)
17. Dartford Rural (1)
18. Dartford West (1)
19. Deal (2)
20. Dover North (1)
21. Dover Town (2)
22. Dover West (1)
23. Elham Valley (1)
24. Faversham (1)
25. Folkestone North East (1)
26. Folkestone South (1)
27. Folkestone West (1)
28. Gravesham East (2)
29. Gravesham Rural (1)
30. Herne & Sturry (1)
31. Herne Bay (2)
32. Hythe (1)
33. Maidstone Central (2)
34. Maidstone North East (1)
35. Maidstone Rural East (1)
36. Maidstone Rural North (1)
37. Maidstone Rural South (1) †
38. Maidstone Rural West (1) †
39. Maidstone South (1) †
40. Maidstone South East (1)
41. Malling Central (1)
42. Malling North (1)
43. Malling Rural East (1)
44. Malling Rural North East (1)
45. Malling West (1)
46. Margate & Cliftonville (2)
47. Margate West (1)
48. Northfleet & Gravesend West (2)
49. Ramsgate (2)
50. Romney Marsh (1)
51. Sandwich (1)
52. Sevenoaks Central (1)
53. Sevenoaks East (1)
54. Sevenoaks North East (1)
55. Sevenoaks South (1)
56. Sevenoaks West (1)
57. Sheerness (1)
58. Sheppey (1)
59. Swale Central (2)
60. Swale East (1)
61. Swale West (1)
62. Swanley (1)
63. Swanscombe & Greenhithe (1)
64. Tenterden (1)
65. Tonbridge (2)
66. Tunbridge Wells East (1)
67. Tunbridge Wells North (1)
68. Tunbridge Wells Rural (1)
69. Tunbridge Wells South (1)
70. Tunbridge Wells West (1)
71. Whitstable (2)
72. Wilmington (1)

† minor boundary changes in 2009

Electoral Divisions from 4 May 2017 to present:

1. Ashford Central (1)
2. Ashford East (1)
3. Ashford Rural East (1)
4. Ashford Rural South (1)
5. Ashford Rural West (1)
6. Ashford South (1)
7. Birchington & Rural (2)
8. Broadstairs (1)
9. Canterbury City North (1)
10. Canterbury City South (1)
11. Canterbury North (1)
12. Canterbury South (1)
13. Cheriton, Sandgate & Hythe East (1)
14. Cliftonville (1)
15. Cranbrook (1)
16. Dartford East (1)
17. Dartford North East (1)
18. Dartford Rural (1)
19. Dartford West (1)
20. Deal & Walmer (2)
21. Dover North (1)
22. Dover Town (2)
23. Dover West (1)
24. Elham Valley (1)
25. Faversham (1)
26. Folkestone East (1)
27. Folkestone West (1)
28. Gravesend East (2)
29. Gravesham Rural (1)
30. Herne Bay East (1)
31. Herne Village & Sturry (1)
32. Hythe West (1)
33. Maidstone Central (2)
34. Maidstone North East (1)
35. Maidstone Rural East (1)
36. Maidstone Rural North (1)
37. Maidstone Rural South (1)
38. Maidstone Rural West (1)
39. Maidstone South (1)
40. Maidstone South East (1)
41. Malling Central (1)
42. Malling North (1)
43. Malling North East (1)
44. Malling Rural East (1)
45. Malling West (1)
46. Margate (1)
47. Northfleet & Gravesend West (2)
48. Ramsgate (2)
49. Romney Marsh (1)
50. Sandwich (1)
51. Sevenoaks North & Darent Valley (1)
52. Sevenoaks Rural North East (1)
53. Sevenoaks Rural South (1)
54. Sevenoaks Town (1)
55. Sevenoaks West (1)
56. Sheppey (2)
57. Sittingbourne North (1)
58. Sittingbourne South (1)
59. Swale East (1)
60. Swale West (1)
61. Swanley (1)
62. Swanscombe & Greenhithe (1)
63. Tenterden (1)
64. Tonbridge (2)
65. Tunbridge Wells East (1)
66. Tunbridge Wells North (1)
67. Tunbridge Wells Rural (1)
68. Tunbridge Wells South (1)
69. Tunbridge Wells West (1)
70. Whitstable East & Herne Bay West (1)
71. Whitstable West (1)
72. Wilmington (1)

== Unitary authority council ==
=== Medway ===
Wards due from 1 May 1997 (order revoked shortly before election):

1. (2)
2. (2)
3. (2)
4. (2)
5. (2)
6. (2)
7. (2)
8. (2)
9. (2)
10. (2)
11. (2)
12. (2)
13. (2)
14. (2)
15. (2)
16. (2)
17. (2)
18. (2)
19. (2)
20. (2)
21. (2)
22. (2)
23. (2)
24. (2)
25. (2)
26. (2)
27. (2)
28. (2)
29. (2)
30. (2)
31. (2)
32. (2)
33. (2)
34. (2)

Wards from 1 April 1998 (first election 1 May 1997) to 1 May 2003:

1. All Saints (2)
2. Beechings (2)
3. Brompton (2)
4. Cuxton & Halling (2)
5. Earl (2)
6. Frindsbury (2)
7. Frindsbury Extra & Chattenden (2)
8. Gillingham North (2)
9. Gillingham South (2)
10. Hempstead & Wigmore (3)
11. Holcombe (3)
12. Hook Meadow (2)
13. Hoo St Werburgh (2)
14. Horsted (2)
15. Lordswood (3)
16. Luton (2)
17. Medway (2)
18. North Dane (2)
19. Parkwood (3)
20. Priestfield (2)
21. Rainham (2)
22. Rainham Mark (3)
23. Rede Court (2)
24. Riverside (2)
25. St Margaret’s & Borstal (3)
26. St Margaret’s (3)
27. Temple Farm (3)
28. Thames Side (2)
29. Town (3)
30. Troy Town (2)
31. Twydall (2)
32. Walderslade (3)
33. Warren Wood (2)
34. Watling Street (2)
35. Wayfield (2)

Wards from 1 May 2003 to 4 May 2023:

1. Chatham Central (3)
2. Cuxton & Halling (1)
3. Gillingham North (3)
4. Gillingham South (3)
5. Hempstead & Wigmore (2)
6. Lordswood & Capstone (2)
7. Luton & Wayfield (3)
8. Peninsula (3)
9. Princes Park (2)
10. Rainham Central (3)
11. Rainham North (2)
12. Rainham South (3)
13. River (2)
14. Rochester East (2)
15. Rochester South & Horsted (3)
16. Rochester West (2)
17. Strood North (3)
18. Strood Rural (3)
19. Strood South (3)
20. Twydall (3)
21. Walderslade (2)
22. Watling (2)

Wards from 4 May 2023 to present:

1. All Saints (1)
2. Chatham Central & Brompton (3)
3. Cuxton, Halling & Riverside (2)
4. Fort Horsted (1)
5. Fort Pitt (3)
6. Gillingham North (3)
7. Gillingham South (3)
8. Hempstead & Wigmore (2)
9. Hoo St Werburgh & High Halstow (3)
10. Lordswood & Walderslade (3)
11. Luton (2)
12. Princes Park (2)
13. Rainham North (3)
14. Rainham South East (3)
15. Rainham South West (2)
16. Rochester East & Warren Wood (3)
17. Rochester West & Borstal (3)
18. St Mary's Island (1)
19. Strood North & Frindsbury (3)
20. Strood Rural (3)
21. Strood West (3)
22. Twydall (2)
23. Watling (3)
24. Wayfield & Weeds Wood (2)

== District councils ==
=== Ashford ===
Wards from 1 April 1974 (first election 7 June 1973) to 6 May 1976:

Wards from 6 May 1976 to 1 May 2003:

Wards from 1 May 2003 to 2 May 2019:

1. Aylesford Green (1)
2. Beaver (2)
3. Biddenden (1)
4. Bockhanger (1)
5. Boughton Aluph & Eastwell (1)
6. Bybrook (1)
7. Charing (1)
8. Downs North (1) [includes Chilham, Godmersham and Molash]
9. Downs West (1) [includes Challock and Hothfield]
10. Godinton (2)
11. Great Chart with Singleton North (1)
12. Highfield (1)
13. Isle of Oxney (1)
14. Kennington (1)
15. Little Burton Farm (1)
16. Norman (1)
17. North Willesborough (2)
18. Park Farm North (1)
19. Park Farm South (1)
20. Rolvenden & Tenterden West (1)
21. Saxon Shore (2) [includes Aldington, Bilsington, Brabourne Lees and Smeeth]
22. Singleton South (1)
23. South Willesborough (1)
24. St Michaels (1)
25. Stanhope (1)
26. Stour (2)
27. Tenterden North (1)
28. Tenterden South (1)
29. Victoria (2)
30. Washford (1)
31. Weald Central (2) [includes Bethersden, High Halden and Pluckley]
32. Weald East (1) [includes Finberry and Mersham]
33. Weald North (1) [includes Egerton and Smarden]
34. Weald South (2) [includes Hamstreet, Shadoxhurst and Woodchurch]
35. Wye (1)

Wards from 2 May 2019 to present:

1. Aylesford & East Stour (2)
2. Beaver (2)
3. Biddenden (1)
4. Bircholt (1)
5. Bockhanger (1)
6. Bybrook (1)
7. Charing (1)
8. Conningbrook & Little Burton Farm (1)
9. Downs North (1)
10. Downs West (1)
11. Furley (2)
12. Goat Lees (1)
13. Godinton (1)
14. Highfield (1)
15. Isle of Oxney (1)
16. Kennington (1)
17. Kingsnorth Village & Bridgefield (1)
18. Mersham, Sevington South with Finberry (1)
19. Norman (1)
20. Park Farm North (1)
21. Park Farm South (1)
22. Repton (2)
23. Rolvenden & Tenterden West (1)
24. Roman (1)
25. Saxon Shore (1)
26. Singleton East (1)
27. Singleton West (1)
28. Stanhope (1)
29. Tenterden North (1)
30. Tenterden South (1)
31. Tenterden St Michael's (1)
32. Upper Weald (1)
33. Victoria (2)
34. Washford (1)
35. Weald Central (2)
36. Weald North (1)
37. Weald South (2)
38. Willesborough (2)
39. Wye with Hinxhill (1)

=== Canterbury ===
Wards from 1 April 1974 (first election 7 June 1973) to 3 May 1979:

Wards from 3 May 1979 to 1 May 2003:

Wards from 1 May 2003 to 7 May 2015:

1. Barham Downs (1)
2. Barton (3)
3. Blean Forest (2)
4. Chartham & Stone Street (2)
5. Chestfield & Swalecliffe (3)
6. Gorrell (2)
7. Greenhill & Eddington (2)
8. Harbledown (1)
9. Harbour (2)
10. Herne & Broomfield (3)
11. Heron (3)
12. Little Stour (1)
13. Marshside (1)
14. Northgate (2)
15. North Nailbourne (1)
16. Reculver (3)
17. St Stephens (3)
18. Seasalter (3)
19. Sturry North (1)
20. Sturry South (1)
21. Tankerton (2)
22. West Bay (2)
23. Westgate (3)
24. Wincheap (3)

Wards from 7 May 2015 to present:

1. Barton (3)
2. Beltinge (2)
3. Blean Forest (3)
4. Chartham & Stone Street (2)
5. Chestfield (2)
6. Gorrell (3)
7. Greenhill (1)
8. Herne & Broomfield (2)
9. Heron (3)
10. Little Stour & Adisham (1)
11. Nailbourne (1)
12. Northgate (2)
13. Reculver (1)
14. Seasalter (2)
15. St Stephen’s (2)
16. Sturry (2)
17. Swalecliffe (1)
18. Tankerton (1)
19. West Bay (1)
20. Westgate (2)
21. Wincheap (2)

=== Dartford ===
Wards from 1 April 1974 (first election 7 June 1973) to 6 May 1976:

Wards from 6 May 1976 to 1 May 2003:

1. Southfleet (2); changed to (1) in 1987
2. Longfield (3); new ward added in 1987

Wards from 1 May 2003 to 2 May 2019:

1. Bean & Darenth (3)
2. Brent (3)
3. Castle (1)
4. Greenhithe (3)
5. Heath (3)
6. Joyce Green (2)
7. Joydens Wood (3)
8. Littlebrook (2)
9. Longfield, New Barn & Southfleet (3)
10. Newtown (3)
11. Princes (3)
12. Stone (3)
13. Sutton-at-Hone & Hawley (2)
14. Swanscombe (3)
15. Town (2)
16. West Hill (3)
17. Wilmington (2)

Wards from 2 May 2019 to present:

1. Bean & Village Park (1)
2. Brent (2)
3. Bridge (1)
4. Burnham (1)
5. Darenth (1)
6. Ebbsfleet (3)
7. Greenhithe & Knockhall (3)
8. Heath (2)
9. Joyden's Wood (2)
10. Longfield, New Barn & Southfleet (3)
11. Maypole & Leyton Cross (1)
12. Newtown (2)
13. Princes (2)
14. Stone Castle (3)
15. Stone House (2)
16. Swanscombe (2)
17. Temple Hill (3)
18. Town (2)
19. West Hill (3)
20. Wilmington, Sutton-at-Hone & Hawley (3)

=== Dover ===
Wards from 1 April 1974 (first election 7 June 1973) to 3 May 1979:

Wards from 3 May 1979 to 1 May 2003:

Wards from 1 May 2003 to 2 May 2019:

1. Aylesham (2)
2. Buckland (3)
3. Capel-le-Ferne (1)
4. Castle (1)
5. Eastry (2)
6. Eythorne & Shepherdswell (2)
7. Little Stour & Ashstone (3)
8. Lydden & Temple Ewell (1)
9. Maxton, Elms Vale & Priory (3)
10. Middle Deal & Sholden (3)
11. Mill Hill (3)
12. North Deal (3)
13. Ringwould (1)
14. River (2)
15. St Margaret's-at-Cliffe (2)
16. St Radigunds (2)
17. Sandwich (3)
18. Tower Hamlets (2)
19. Town & Pier (1)
20. Walmer (3)
21. Whitfield (2)

Wards from 2 May 2019 to present:

1. Alkham & Capel-le-Ferne (1)
2. Aylesham, Eythorne & Shepherdswell (3)
3. Buckland (2)
4. Dover Downs & River (2)
5. Eastry Rural (2)
6. Guston, Kingsdown & St Margaret's-at-Cliffe (2)
7. Little Stour & Ashstone (2)
8. Maxton & Elms Vale (1)
9. Middle Deal (2)
10. Mill Hill (2)
11. North Deal (2)
12. Sandwich (2)
13. St Radigunds (2)
14. Tower Hamlets (1)
15. Town & Castle (2)
16. Walmer (2)
17. Whitfield (2)

=== Gravesham ===
Wards from 1 April 1974 (first election 7 June 1973) to 3 May 1979:

Wards from 3 May 1979 to 1 May 2003:

Wards from 1 May 2003 to 4 May 2023:

1. Central (3)
2. Chalk (1)
3. Coldharbour (2)
4. Higham (2)
5. Istead Rise (2)
6. Meopham North (2)
7. Meopham South & Vigo (2)
8. Northfleet North (3)
9. Northfleet South (3)
10. Painters Ash (3)
11. Pelham (3)
12. Riverside (3)
13. Riverview (2)
14. Shorne, Cobham & Luddesdown (2)
15. Singlewell (3)
16. Westcourt (3)
17. Whitehill (2)
18. Woodlands (3)

Wards from 4 May 2023 to present:

1. Chalk (1)
2. Coldharbour & Perry Street (3)
3. Denton (2)
4. Higham & Shorne (3)
5. Istead Rise, Cobham & Luddesdown (2)
6. Meopham North (2)
7. Meopham South & Vigo (2)
8. Northfleet & Springhead (3)
9. Painters Ash (2)
10. Pelham (2)
11. Riverview Park (2)
12. Rosherville (2)
13. Singlewell (2)
14. Town (3)
15. Westcourt (2)
16. Whitehill & Windmill Hill (3)
17. Woodlands (3)

=== Maidstone ===
Wards from 1 April 1974 (first election 7 June 1973) to 3 May 1979:

Wards from 3 May 1979 to 2 May 2002:

Wards from 2 May 2002 to 2 May 2024:

1. Allington (3)
2. Barming (1); renamed Barming & Teston in 2017
3. Bearsted (3)
4. Boughton Monchelsea & Chart Sutton (1)
5. Boxley (3)
6. Bridge (2)
7. Coxheath & Hunton (3) †
8. Detling & Thurnham (1)
9. Downswood & Otham (1)
10. East (3)
11. Fant (3)
12. Harrietsham & Lenham (2)
13. Headcorn (2)
14. Heath (2)
15. High Street (3)
16. Leeds (1)
17. Loose (1) †
18. Marden & Yalding (3)
19. North (3)
20. North Downs (1)
21. Park Wood (2)
22. Shepway North (3)
23. Shepway South (2)
24. South (3) †
25. Staplehurst (2)
26. Sutton Valence & Langley (1)

† minor boundary changes in 2011

Wards from 2 May 2024 to present:

1. Allington & Bridge (2)
2. Barming Heath & Teston (2)
3. Bearsted & Downswood (3)
4. Boughton Monchelsea & Chart Sutton (1)
5. Boxley Downs (2)
6. Coxheath & Farleigh (2)
7. Fant & Oakwood (3)
8. Grove Green & Vinters Park (3)
9. Harrietsham, Lenham & North Downs (3)
10. Headcorn & Sutton Valence (2)
11. High Street (3)
12. Leeds & Langley (2)
13. Loose & Linton (2)
14. Marden & Yalding (3)
15. Palace Wood (3)
16. Park Wood & Mangravet (3)
17. Penenden Heath (3)
18. Ringlestone (1)
19. Senacre (1)
20. Shepway (3)
21. Staplehurst (2)
22. Tovil (2)

=== Sevenoaks ===
Wards from 1 April 1974 (first election 7 June 1973) to 3 May 1979:

Wards from 3 May 1979 to 1 May 2003:

1. Fawkham & Hartley () †
2. Longfield (); ward abolished in 1987

† minor boundary changes in 1987

Wards from 1 May 2003 to present:

1. Ash (3); renamed Ash & New Ash Green in 2011 †
2. Brasted, Chevening & Sundridge (3) †
3. Cowden & Hever (1)
4. Crockenhill & Well Hill (1)
5. Dunton Green & Riverhead (2)
6. Edenbridge North & East (2)
7. Edenbridge South & West (2)
8. Eynsford (1) †
9. Farningham, Horton Kirby & South Darenth (2)
10. Fawkham & West Kingsdown (3)
11. Halstead, Knockholt & Badgers Mount (2)
12. Hartley & Hodsoll Street (3) †
13. Hextable (2) †
14. Kemsing (2)
15. Leigh & Chiddingstone Causeway (1) †
16. Otford & Shoreham (2) †
17. Penshurst, Fordcombe & Chiddingstone (1) †
18. Seal & Weald (2)
19. Sevenoaks Eastern (2)
20. Sevenoaks Kippington (2)
21. Sevenoaks Northern (2)
22. Sevenoaks Town & St John's (3)
23. Swanley Christchurch & Swanley Village (3) †
24. Swanley St Mary's (2)
25. Swanley White Oak (3)
26. Westerham & Crockham Hill (2) †

† minor boundary changes in 2015

=== Shepway/Folkestone and Hythe ===
Wards from 1 April 1974 (first election 7 June 1973) to 3 May 1979:

Wards from 3 May 1979 to 1 May 2003:

Wards from 1 May 2003 to 7 May 2015:

1. Dymchurch & St Mary’s Bay (3)
2. Elham & Stelling Minnis (1)
3. Folkestone Cheriton (3)
4. Folkestone East (2)
5. Folkestone Foord (2)
6. Folkestone Harbour (2)
7. Folkestone Harvey Central (2)
8. Folkestone Harvey West (2)
9. Folkestone Morehall (2)
10. Folkestone Park (3)
11. Folkestone Sandgate (2)
12. Hythe Central (3)
13. Hythe East (2)
14. Hythe West (2)
15. Lydd (3)
16. Lympne & Stanford (1)
17. New Romney Coast (2)
18. New Romney Town (2)
19. North Downs East (3)
20. North Downs West (2)
21. Romney Marsh (1)
22. Tolsford (1)

Wards from 7 May 2015 to present:

1. Broadmead (1)
2. Cheriton (3)
3. East Folkestone (3)
4. Folkestone Central (3)
5. Folkestone Harbour (2)
6. Hythe (3)
7. Hythe Rural (2)
8. New Romney (2)
9. North Downs East (3)
10. North Downs West (2)
11. Romney Marsh (2)
12. Sandgate & West Folkestone (2)
13. Walland & Denge Marsh (2)

=== Swale ===
Wards from 1 April 1974 (first election 7 June 1973) to 3 May 1979:

Wards from 3 May 1979 to 2 May 2002:

Wards from 2 May 2002 to 7 May 2015:

1. Abbey (2)
2. Borden (1)
3. Boughton & Courtenay (2)
4. Chalkwell (2)
5. Davington Priory (1)
6. East Downs (1)
7. Grove (2)
8. Hartlip, Newington & Upchurch (2)
9. Iwade & Lower Halstow (1)
10. Kemsley (2)
11. Leysdown & Warden (1)
12. Milton Regis (2)
13. Minster Cliffs (3)
14. Murston (2)
15. Queenborough & Halfway (3)
16. Roman (2)
17. St Ann's (2)
18. St Michaels (2)
19. Sheerness East (2)
20. Sheerness West (2)
21. Sheppey Central (3)
22. Teynham & Lynsted (2)
23. Watling (2)
24. West Downs (1)
25. Woodstock (2)

Wards from 7 May 2015 to present:

1. Abbey (2)
2. Bobbing, Iwade & Lower Halstow (2)
3. Borden & Grove Park (2)
4. Boughton & Courtenay (2)
5. Chalkwell (1)
6. East Downs (1)
7. Hartlip, Newington & Upchurch (2)
8. Homewood (2)
9. Kemsley (2)
10. Milton Regis (2)
11. Minster Cliffs (3)
12. Murston (2)
13. Priory (1)
14. Queenborough & Halfway (3)
15. Roman (2)
16. Sheerness (3)
17. Sheppey Central (3)
18. Sheppey East (2)
19. St Ann’s (2)
20. Teynham & Lynsted (2)
21. The Meads (1)
22. Watling (2)
23. West Downs (1)
24. Woodstock (2)

=== Thanet ===
Wards from 1 April 1974 (first election 7 June 1973) to 3 May 1979:

Wards from 3 May 1979 to 1 May 2003:

Wards from 1 May 2003 to present:

1. Beacon Road (2)
2. Birchington North (2)
3. Birchington South (3)
4. Bradstowe (2)
5. Central Harbour (3)
6. Cliffsend & Pegwell (2)
7. Cliftonville East (3)
8. Cliftonville West (3)
9. Dane Valley (3)
10. Eastcliff (3)
11. Garlinge (2)
12. Kingsgate (1)
13. Margate Central (2)
14. Nethercourt (2)
15. Newington (2)
16. Northwood (3)
17. St Peters (3)
18. Salmestone (2)
19. Sir Moses Montefiore (2)
20. Thanet Villages (3) [includes Acol, Minster and St Nicholas at Wade]
21. Viking (3)
22. Westbrook (2)
23. Westgate-on-Sea (3)

=== Tonbridge and Malling ===
Wards from 1 April 1974 (first election 7 June 1973) to 3 May 1979:

Wards from 3 May 1979 to 2 May 1991:

Wards from 2 May 1991 to 1 May 2003:

1. Aylesford (3)
2. Birling, Leybourne & Ryarsh (2)
3. Blue Bell Hill (2)
4. Borough Green (2)
5. Burham, Eccles & Wouldham (2)
6. Cage Green (2)
7. Castle (2)
8. Ditton (3)
9. East Malling (2)
10. East Peckham (2)
11. Hadlow (2)
12. Higham (3)
13. Hildenborough (3)
14. Ightham (1)
15. Judd (2)
16. Larkfield North (2)
17. Larkfield South (2)
18. Long Mill (2)
19. Medway (2)
20. Oast (1)
21. Snodland East (2)
22. Snodland West (2)
23. Trench (3)
24. Vauxhall (2)
25. Wateringbury (1)
26. West Malling, West Peckham & Mereworth (2)
27. Wrotham (1)

Wards from 1 May 2003 to 7 May 2015:

1. Aylesford (2)
2. Blue Bell Hill & Walderslade (2)
3. Borough Green & Long Mill (3)
4. Burham, Eccles & Wouldham (2)
5. Cage Green (2)
6. Castle (2)
7. Ditton (2)
8. Downs (2)
9. East Malling (2)
10. East Peckham & Golden Green (2)
11. Hadlow, Mereworth & West Peckham (2)
12. Higham (3)
13. Hildenborough (2)
14. Ightham (1)
15. Judd (2)
16. Kings Hill (2)
17. Larkfield North (2)
18. Larkfield South (2)
19. Medway (2)
20. Snodland East (2)
21. Snodland West (3)
22. Trench (2)
23. Vauxhall (2)
24. Wateringbury (1)
25. West Malling & Leybourne (3)
26. Wrotham (1)

Wards from 7 May 2015 to present:

1. Aylesford North & Walderslade (3)
2. Aylesford South (2)
3. Borough Green & Long Mill (3)
4. Burham & Wouldham (2)
5. Cage Green (2)
6. Castle (2)
7. Ditton (2)
8. Downs & Mereworth (2)
9. East Malling (2)
10. Hadlow & East Peckham (3)
11. Higham (2)
12. Hildenborough (2)
13. Judd (2)
14. Kings Hill (3)
15. Larkfield North (2)
16. Larkfield South (2)
17. Medway (3)
18. Snodland East & Ham Hill (2)
19. Snodland West & Holborough Lakes (3)
20. Trench (2)
21. Vauxhall (2)
22. West Malling & Leybourne (3)
23. Wrotham, Ightham & Stansted (2)
24. Wateringbury (1)

=== Tunbridge Wells ===
Wards from 1 April 1974 (first election 7 June 1973) to 6 May 1976:

Wards from 6 May 1976 to 2 May 2002:

Wards from 2 May 2002 to 2 May 2024:

1. Benenden & Cranbrook (3)
2. Brenchley & Horsmonden (2)
3. Broadwater (2)
4. Capel (1)
5. Culverden (3)
6. Frittenden & Sissinghurst (1)
7. Goudhurst & Lamberhurst (2)
8. Hawkhurst & Sandhurst (3)
9. Paddock Wood East (2)
10. Paddock Wood West (2)
11. Pantiles & St Mark's (3)
12. Park (3)
13. Pembury (3)
14. Rusthall (2)
15. St James' (2)
16. St John's (3)
17. Sherwood (3)
18. Southborough & High Brooms (3)
19. Southborough North (2)
20. Speldhurst & Bidborough (3)

Wards from 2 May 2024 to present:

1. Cranbrook, Sissinghurst & Frittenden (3)
2. Culverden (3)
3. Hawkhurst, Sandhurst & Benenden (3)
4. High Brooms (1)
5. Paddock Wood (3)
6. Pantiles (3)
7. Park (3)
8. Pembury & Capel (3)
9. Rural Tunbridge Wells (3)
10. Rusthall & Speldhurst (3)
11. Sherwood (3)
12. Southborough & Bidborough (3)
13. St James' (3)
14. St John's (2)

== Former district councils ==
=== Gillingham ===
Wards from 1 April 1974 (first election 7 June 1973) to 3 May 1979:

Wards from 3 May 1979 to 1 April 1998 (district abolished):

=== Rochester-upon-Medway ===
Wards from 1 April 1974 (first election 7 June 1973) to 3 May 1979:

Wards from 3 May 1979 to 1 April 1998 (district abolished):

== Electoral wards by constituency ==
Wards as they existed on 1 December 2020.

=== Ashford ===
Ashford: Aylesford & East Stour; Beaver; Bircholt; Bockhanger; Bybrook; Conningbrook & Little Burton Farm; Furley; Goat Lees; Godinton; Highfield; Kennington; Mersham, Sevington South with Finberry; Norman; Park Farm North; Park Farm South; Repton; Roman; Singleton East; Singleton West; Stanhope; Victoria; Washford; Willesborough; Wye with Hinxhill.

Folkestone and Hythe: North Downs East; North Downs West.

=== Canterbury ===
Canterbury: Barton; Blean Forest; Chartham & Stone Street; Chestfield; Gorrell; Little Stour & Adisham; Nailbourne; Northgate; St. Stephens; Seasalter; Swalecliffe; Tankerton; Westgate; Wincheap.

=== Chatham and Aylesford ===
Medway: Chatham Central; Lordswood & Capstone; Luton & Wayfield; Princes Park; Rochester South & Horsted; Walderslade.

Tonbridge and Malling: Aylesford North & Walderslade; Burham & Wouldham; Larkfield North; Larkfield South; Snodland East & Ham Hill; Snodland West & Holborough Lakes.

=== Dartford ===
Dartford: Bean & Village Park; Brent; Burnham; Darenth; Ebbsfleet; Greenhithe & Knockhall; Heath; Joyden’s Wood; Longfield, New Barn & Southfleet; Maypole & Leyton Cross; Newtown; Princes; Stone Castle; Stone House; Swanscombe; Temple Hill; Town; West Hill.

=== Dover and Deal ===
Dover: Alkham & Capel-le-Ferne; Aylesham, Eythorne & Shepherdswell; Buckland; Dover Downs & River; Eastry Rural; Guston, Kingsdown & St. Margaret’s-at-Cliffe; Maxton & Elms Vale; Middle Deal; Mill Hill; North Deal; St. Radigunds; Tower Hamlets; Town & Castle; Walmer; Whitfield.

=== East Thanet ===
Thanet: Beacon Road; Bradstowe; Central Harbour; Cliffsend & Pegwell; Cliftonville East; Cliftonville West; Dane Valley; Eastcliff; Kingsgate; Margate Central; Nethercourt; Newington; Northwood; St. Peters; Salmestone; Sir Moses Montefiore; Viking.

=== Faversham and Mid Kent ===
Maidstone: Bearsted; Boxley; Detling & Thurnham; Downswood & Otham; Harrietsham & Lenham; Leeds; North Downs; Park Wood; Shepway North; Shepway South.

Swale: Abbey; Boughton & Courtenay; East Downs; Priory; St. Ann’s; Teynham & Lynsted; Watling; West Downs.

=== Folkestone and Hythe ===
Folkestone and Hythe: Broadmead; Cheriton; East Folkestone; Folkestone Central; Folkestone Harbour; Hythe; Hythe Rural; New Romney; Romney Marsh; Sandgate & West Folkestone; Walland & Denge Marsh.

=== Gillingham and Rainham ===
Medway: Gillingham North; Gillingham South; Hempstead & Wigmore; Rainham Central; Rainham North; Rainham South; Twydall; Watling.

=== Gravesham ===
Gravesham: Central; Chalk; Coldharbour; Higham; Istead Rise; Meopham North; Meopham South & Vigo; Northfleet North; Northfleet South; Painters Ash; Pelham; Riverside; Riverview; Shorne, Cobham & Luddesdown; Singlewell; Westcourt; Whitehill; Woodlands.

=== Herne Bay and Sandwich ===
Canterbury: Beltinge; Greenhill; Herne & Broomfield; Heron; Reculver; Sturry; West Bay.

Dover: Little Stour & Ashstone; Sandwich.

Thanet: Birchington North; Birchington South; Garlinge; Thanet Villages; Westbrook; Westgate-on-Sea.

=== Maidstone and Malling ===
Maidstone: Allington; Barming & Teston; Bridge; East; Fant; Heath; High Street; North; South.

Tonbridge and Malling: Aylesford South; Ditton; East Malling; Kings Hill; West Malling & Leybourne.

=== Rochester and Strood ===
Medway: Cuxton & Halling; Peninsula; River; Rochester East; Rochester West; Strood North; Strood Rural; Strood South.

=== Sevenoaks ===
Dartford: Wilmington, Sutton-at-Hone & Hawley.

Sevenoaks: Brasted, Chevening & Sundridge; Crockenhill & Well Hill; Dunton Green & Riverhead; Eynsford; Farningham, Horton Kirby & South Darenth; Fawkham & West Kingsdown; Halstead, Knockholt & Badgers Mount; Hextable; Kemsing; Otford & Shoreham; Seal & Weald; Sevenoaks Eastern; Sevenoaks Kippington; Sevenoaks Northern; Sevenoaks Town & St. John’s; Swanley Christchurch & Swanley Village; Swanley St. Mary’s; Swanley White Oak; Westerham & Crockham Hill.

=== Sittingbourne and Sheppey ===
Swale: Bobbing, Iwade & Lower Halstow; Borden & Grove Park; Chalkwell; Hartlip, Newington & Upchurch; Homewood; Kemsley; Milton Regis; Minster Cliffs; Murston; Queenborough & Halfway; Roman; Sheerness; Sheppey Central; Sheppey East; The Meads; Woodstock.

=== Tonbridge ===
Sevenoaks: Ash & New Ash Green; Cowden & Hever; Edenbridge North & East; Edenbridge South & West; Hartley & Hodsoll Street; Leigh & Chiddingstone Causeway; Penshurst, Fordcombe & Chiddingstone.

Tonbridge and Malling: Borough Green & Long Mill; Cage Green; Castle; Downs & Mereworth; Hadlow & East Peckham; Higham; Hildenborough; Judd; Medway; Trench; Vauxhall; Wateringbury; Wrotham, Ightham & Stansted.

=== Tunbridge Wells ===
Tunbridge Wells: Brenchley & Horsmonden; Broadwater; Capel; Culverden; Goudhurst & Lamberhurst; Hawkhurst & Sandhurst; Paddock Wood East; Paddock Wood West; Pantiles & St. Mark’s; Park; Pembury; Rusthall; St. James’; St. John’s; Sherwood; Southborough & High Brooms; Southborough North; Speldhurst & Bidborough.

=== Weald of Kent ===
Ashford: Biddenden; Charing; Downs North; Downs West; Isle of Oxney; Kingsnorth Village & Bridgefield; Rolvenden & Tenterden West; Saxon Shore; Tenterden North; Tenterden St. Michael’s; Tenterden South; Upper Weald; Weald Central; Weald North; Weald South.

Maidstone: Boughton Monchelsea & Chart Sutton; Coxheath & Hunton; Headcorn; Loose; Marden & Yalding; Staplehurst; Sutton Valence & Langley.

Tunbridge Wells: Benenden & Cranbrook; Frittenden & Sissinghurst.

== See also ==
- List of parliamentary constituencies in Kent
