= Dover transmitting station =

Radio broadcasting facility

Dover
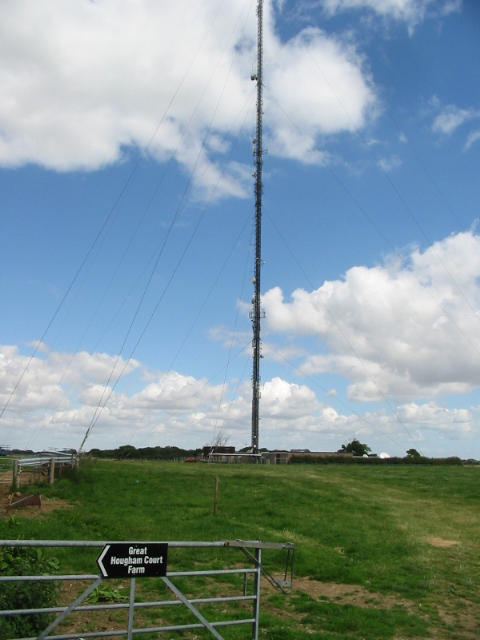
- Transmitting Station

- Location within Kent
- Mast height: 243.2 metres (798 ft)
- Coordinates: 51.111667°N 1.2475°E
- Grid reference: TR274397
- BBC region: BBC South East
- ITV region: ITV Meridian (South East)

The Dover transmitting station is a facility for broadcasting and telecommunications, located at West Hougham, near Dover, Kent (grid reference TR274397). It came into full operation on 31 January 1960. It has a 243.2 metres (798 ft) high guyed steel lattice mast of triangular cross section. The station is owned by Arqiva. The recommended UHF aerial group is C/D with horizontal polarisation.

There is also a relay transmitter located in the town of Dover (Dover Town); in addition FM radio services are covered by the Swingate transmitting station.

It broadcasts television and radio services to south and east Kent. This includes the city of Canterbury and towns such as Dover, Deal, St Margaret's at Cliffe, Margate, Ramsgate, Westgate-on-Sea, Broadstairs, Sandwich, Folkestone, Hythe, Hawkinge, New Romney, Dymchurch, Romney Marsh, Lydd, Ashford, Tenterden, Herne Bay, Whitstable and Faversham.

Along with Heathfield and Bluebell Hill, Dover transmits regional television services from BBC One South East and ITV Meridian (South East).

The mast is visible on very clear days from The Shard in central London, at distance of 102km.

== Analogue radio (FM VHF) ==
Frequency	kW	Service
97.0 MHz	0.5	Heart South
101.8 MHz	1 (H); 4.2 (V)	Classic FM

== Digital radio (DAB) ==
Frequency	Block	kW	Operator
222.064 MHz	11D	1	Digital One
225.648 MHz	12B	1	BBC National DAB

== Digital television ==
Frequency	UHF	kW	Operator	System
690.000 MHz	48	40	Arqiva B	DVB-T
570.000 MHz	33	80	BBC A	DVB-T
586.000 MHz	35	80	Digital 3&4	DVB-T
594.000 MHz	36	80	BBC B	DVB-T2
618.000 MHz	39	40	SDN	DVB-T
642.000 MHz	42	40	Arqiva A	DVB-T

=== Before switchover ===
Frequency	UHF	kW	Operator
618.000 MHz	39	2	Arqiva (Mux C)†
642.000 MHz	42	2	Digital 3&4 (Mux 2)†
666.000 MHz	45	2	BBC (Mux 1)†
746.000 MHz	55	2	Arqiva (Mux D)
770.000 MHz	58	2	BBC (Mux B)
786.000 MHz	60	2	SDN (Mux A)
794.000 MHz	61	2	Digital 3&4 (Mux 2)
802.000 MHz	62	2	Arqiva (Mux C)
850.000 MHz	68	1	BBC (Mux 1)

† Transmitted from Dover B.

== Analogue television ==
Analogue television transmissions have now ceased. BBC Two was closed on 13 June 2012, with BBC One being temporarily moved into its place, followed by the remaining three services on 27 June. Channel 5 was never provided for from Dover because of likely interference from continental transmitters.

Frequency	UHF	kW	Service
703.25 MHz	50	100	BBC1 South East
727.25 MHz	53	100	Channel 4
751.25 MHz	56	100	BBC2 South East
831.25 MHz	66	100	Meridian

== See also ==
- List of masts
- List of tallest buildings and structures in Great Britain
