= Stelling Minnis =

Village in Kent, England

Coordinates: 51.180°N 1.063°E

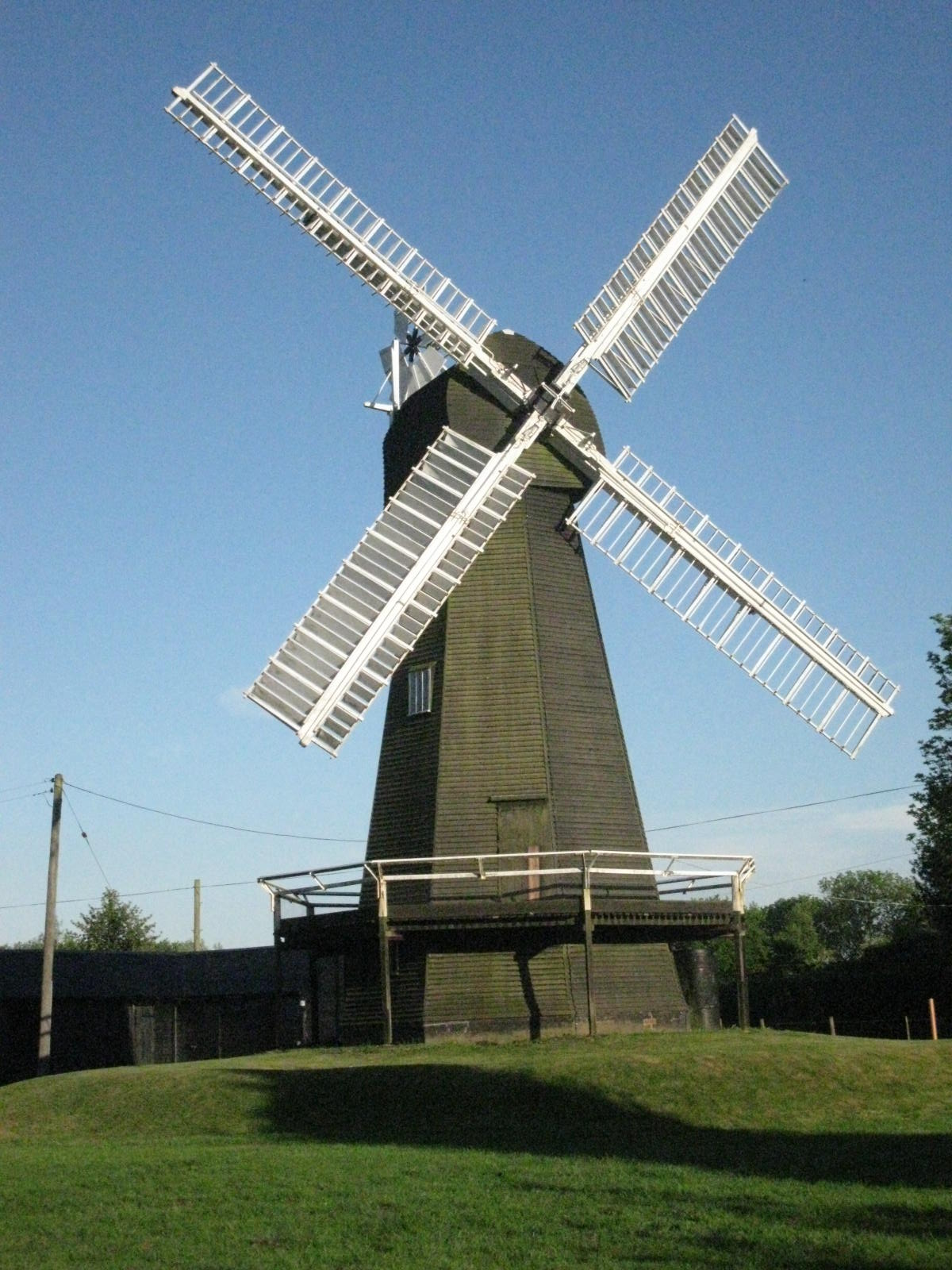
- Davison's Mill

- Location within Kent
- Population: 578 (2011)
- District: Folkestone and Hythe
- Shire county: Kent
- Region: South East
- Country: England
- Sovereign state: United Kingdom
- Post town: Canterbury
- Postcode district: CT4
- Police: Kent
- Fire: Kent
- Ambulance: South East Coast
- UK Parliament: Ashford

Stelling Minnis is a village and civil parish in the Folkestone and Hythe district in Kent, England. The village lies 13 kilometres (8 mi) to the south of Canterbury, and to the east of the B2068, Stone Street, the Roman road, which takes traffic between Lympne and Canterbury.

== Etymology ==
Stelling was a village a mile from the Stelling minnis. Stelling was an Old English word for a shelter or cattle fold; stell also being a Germanic word for a farmer of a small number of cattle.

A minnis was ancient common pasture land cleared from the wooded upper slopes on the high clay caps of the Kent chalk downland. The word 'minnis' is believed to derive from the Saxon word (ge)maennes, which means 'common land used as pasture'. It has been suggested that these areas, which were characteristically on the higher reaches of the Downs, formed large tracts of common unenclosed 'waste' grassland used by a number of distant settlements. In the 17th century, most of these minnises were incorporated into the manorial lands and the commoners excluded. The enclosure acts took most of the Kent minnises, but commoners retained access to Stelling Minnis, and a village grew to take its name.

== Common ==
Stelling Minnis Common comprising 124 acres (50 Ha) is privately owned by the Trustees of the estate of the late Lord Tomlin of Ash and is one of the last remaining manorial commons in Kent. The Minnis is managed by volunteers drawn from the local community to act on behalf of the owners. Their work is guided by a management plan produced by Kent Wildlife Trust to enhance the biodiversity of the Minnis and promote the well-being of local residents and the wider community.

=== Ponds ===
There are several active ponds on the Minnis providing a mix of open water, aquatic, and marginal plants attracting dragonflies, damselflies, frogs, toads, and newts.

=== Flora and fauna ===
The habitat comprises mainly acidic grassland and heathland featuring a reduced variety of plants such as western gorse (Ulex gallii), heather, fungi — including some fly agaric — and many lichens. The associated woodland consists of broadleaved old English species such as oak and birch, and typical natives of the North Downs, such as yew and holly.

This habitat is home to badgers, foxes, voles, shrews, and weasels, and pipistrelle and long-eared bats. Jays, green and great spotted woodpeckers are frequently seen, and rarer sightings include yellowhammers, chiffchaffs and tree pipits. Many butterflies, such as the comma and hedge brown thrive here. Also found are turtle doves, nightingales, grey and red-legged partridges, and barn and long-eared owls.

=== Grazing ===
Grazing has continued here for hundreds of years as an important element of subsistence farming. Today, Kent Wildlife Trust recommends it as a proven successful method of maintaining the habitats of heaths. This is because:

- It is selective and tends to favour the less aggressive flora
- Hoof prints open up small pockets that can be colonized by seed
- And it produces a net reduction in the nutrient content of the area grazed.

Without grazing, this habitat and the wildlife it attracts would be replaced by common shrubs of little interest.

== Windmill ==
Stelling Minnis is home to a Grade I listed wooden smock mill, built in 1866, and operated until 1970 when the last miller Alec Davison, died. It was restored to full working condition in 2003 with funding jointly provided by Kent County Council and the Heritage Lottery Fund. Alongside the windmill is a museum exhibiting the history of the mill, and of the common as a whole. This is seasonally operated by volunteers.

== Church ==
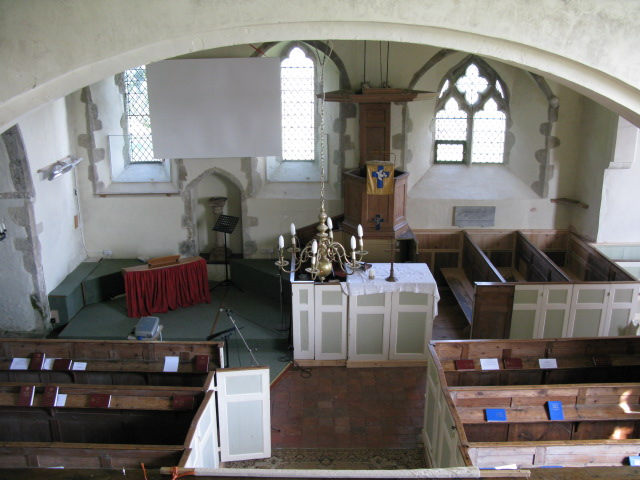
The box pews in St Mary's

The Anglican church, St Mary's is grade I listed. It is about 800 years old, though with many more recent features including box pews.

== Amenities ==
A Village Store and integrated Post Office can be found on the green as well as the Rose and Crown Public House.
