= Marden rail crash =

Fatal rail crash in Kent, United Kingdom, in 1969

Details
- Date: 4 January 1969; 20:42 CET
- Location: Between Paddock Wood and Marden railway stations
- Coordinates: Approximately TQ 724 449; 51°10′40″N 0°27′57″E
- Country: England
- Line: South East Main Line
- Cause: Driver error (Signal passed at danger)

Statistics
- Trains: 2
- Passengers: 170
- Deaths: 4
- Injured: 11

The Marden rail crash occurred on 4 January 1969 near Marden, Kent, United Kingdom, when a passenger train ran into the rear of a parcels train, having passed two signals at danger. Four people were killed and 11 were injured. One person was awarded the British Empire Medal for his part in the aftermath of the collision.

== Background ==
On the evening of 4 January 1969, the weather in the Paddock Wood and Marden area was foggy, with visibility as low as 25 yards (23 m) in places. There were three trains involved in the sequence of events leading up to the accident. Another factor in the accident was the failure of a track circuit in the Marden area.

The first train was a special rail train comprising five "salmon" flat wagons loaded with 300-foot (91 m) lengths of continuous welded rail, two brake vans and a seven-wagon fitted head (a rake of wagons fitted with vacuum brakes), which had departed from Paddock Wood Down Siding West at 20:12. This was some two hours later than scheduled because the driver had had to collect the fitted head from Tonbridge. The train was restricted to a maximum speed of 25 miles per hour (40 km/h). The second train was the 19:18 London Bridge to Dover Priory parcels train, hauled by Class 33/0 diesel-electric locomotive D6558 and comprising a 4-wheel refrigerated van, two 4-wheel parcels vans, four bogie parcels vans and a 4-wheel Covered Carriage Truck. This train was running eight minutes behind the rail train. It was scheduled to pass Paddock Wood 20 minutes before the third train, and arrive at Ashford 18 1/2 minutes before the third train. The third train was the 20:00 Charing Cross to Ramsgate passenger train, comprising two 4CEP electric multiple units, Nos. 7181 and 7117.

Shortly after 19:00, track circuit FJ, on the down line at Marden, failed due to a broken stretcher bar on a set of catch points near Marden station. The effect of the failure was that it caused automatic signal A370 to display a danger aspect. The driver of the first train to reach signal A370 contacted Ashford signal box by telephone. He was informed that the track circuit had failed, and authorised to pass the signal at danger in order to inspect the line as far as the next signal, A372. On reaching that signal, he was again to report by telephone to Ashford signalbox. When he reported from signal A372, the driver was told to continue as normal, obeying whatever aspects the signals were showing.

Six more trains also passed along the line during the period that the track circuit had failed, each passing signal A370 at danger under the authority of the Ashford signalman. At 20:28, the driver of the rail train telephoned the signalman at Ashford and was given the same authority to pass it at danger. The parcels train was then held at signal A324, which was showing a danger aspect as the rail train was still occupying the track circuit ahead of the signal. The secondman of the parcels train was told to wait until the signal cleared as the rail train was ahead of them. He was also told of the track circuit failure, and that he was to report again from signal A370. At about this time (between 20:30 and 20:40), the track circuit fault was fixed, and signal A370 was showing a proceed aspect when the parcels train reached it. The driver stopped and the secondman reported to the Ashford signalman by telephone as previously instructed. He was told to proceed normally, obeying the aspects shown by the signals.

== Accident ==
The passenger train passed Paddock Wood at 20:38 1/2, which was 3 1/2 minutes ahead of schedule. At that time, the parcels train was occupying track circuit FH. Signal PE129 was showing line clear. The passenger train cleared track circuits FF and FG, and entered track circuit FH which was still occupied by the parcels train. The signalman at Ashford sent the "obstruction danger" signal to Tonbridge signal box at 20:42. The parcels train had reached a maximum speed of 15 miles per hour (24 km/h) when it was hit from the rear by the passenger train at a closing speed of between 75 miles per hour (121 km/h) and 80 miles per hour (130 km/h), having passed signal A322 at caution and signal A324 at danger. Signal A370 was still showing proceed as the parcels train had not reached track circuit FH, which controlled that signal.

The leading carriage of the passenger train was derailed to the left, and rolled down the embankment ending up upside down at a point some 115 yards (105 m) beyond the point of the collision. The second carriage ended up on its left side between the wreckage of the first carriage and the railway, and slightly ahead of it. The third carriage jack-knifed, with its leading end down the embankment and its trailing end on the railway. The remaining five carriages were all derailed towards the up line, with only the rear bogie of the rear carriage remaining on the rails.

The rear three vans of the parcels train were destroyed; the remains of the rear van ended up on the up line, ahead of the van in front of it, and roughly parallel with the third coach of the passenger train. the seventh van went down the embankment on the up side, ending up roughly parallel with the seventh coach of the passenger train. The sixth van derailed across the up line with one end 15 feet (4.6 m) in the air and at right angles across the rear van. The rear end of the fifth van was burst open, and the van was buffer locked with the fourth van. This van was slightly damaged. Both the fourth and fifth vans remained on the rails, but were too badly damaged to run. The parcels train itself was propelled forwards by the force of the collision. Wreckage from the collision short-circuited the conductor rails, tripping the power supply off. Although wreckage was fouling the up line, it did not short-circuit the track circuits of the up line, allowing Signal A321 to display a proceed aspect. Had a train been on the up line at the time of the collision, there is a strong chance that a second collision would have occurred. Fortunately, the nearest train had not reached Headcorn at the time.

== Aftermath ==
The guard of the parcels train had been travelling in the rear cab of the locomotive. He was thrown from his seat by the force of the collision but was not injured. He walked towards Paddock Wood and was met by the guard of the passenger train. They agreed between themselves that the guard of the passenger train would protect the line to the rear of the accident site and that the guard of the parcels train would go forward to Marden station where he could summon help by telephone from an electricity substation there. The call was made at 20:58. It was then confirmed that the electricity supply was off. The guard of the passenger train reported the accident to Ashford signalbox from signal A370. This call was made at about 20:45. The signalman at Tonbridge stopped an up passenger train at Headcorn and held it there. Agreement was made with Ashford signalbox that no further trains would be despatched from Ashford towards Tonbridge. The Ashford steam crane was used to clear the wreckage.

A total of 18 ambulances and 10 fire engines attended the accident. The first ambulance arrived at Marden station at 21:06. Ambulances from Ashford, the Medway Towns and Southborough attended. The fire engines came from Ashford, Cranbrook, Maidstone, Marden, Matfield, Tonbridge and Tunbridge Wells. The site of the accident was difficult for the emergency services to reach, with the darkness and fog contributing to this. David Winch, the farm manager at Brook Farm, Marden, and his staff provided access by using farm tractors hauling trailers across two ploughed fields. Rescuers were transported to the site, and the passengers were taken from the site to waiting ambulances. The WRVS set up a field kitchen to provide hot food and drink to the rescuers. The driver of the passenger train and three passengers had been killed in the collision. All the injured had been freed from the wreckage by 23:37. The last of the deceased was not removed until 08:55 on 7 January. Eleven passengers were taken to hospital. Of those, nine were admitted, with eight having been discharged by the end of January and the ninth being discharged on 1 April. Two people were seriously injured; one losing his left arm and the other with a broken back. For his part in the rescue operation, Stanley Skinner, who was the officer in charge of the ambulances at the scene, was awarded the British Empire Medal. All the injured were taken to the West Kent Hospital in Maidstone, apart from one person who was taken by a passing motorist to Ashford Hospital.

Amongst the rescuers were three teenagers who had heard the crash, Steven Nye, Peter Judge and Christopher Peen. They went to Marden station where the clerk on duty had not heard of the crash, and seemed not to believe them when they told him they had heard it. Peen's father was in the Fire Brigade, so they went to the fire station where they found that the fire engines had been called out to a train crash at Brook Farm. The trio returned to the railway station, where the clerk had by now been informed of the crash. After confirmation that the power was off had been given, they were told that they could assist in the rescue and were to report to the police on arrival at the scene. The trio assisted the survivors by escorting and assisting them to the transport provided by Brook Farm, becoming plastered in mud in the process. It was after midnight before they got home to worried parents.

As a result of the line being blocked, trains were diverted to run via the Maidstone East Line. Local trains on the line between Tonbridge and Ashford terminated at Paddock Wood and Staplehurst, with a bus service provided between those two stations and calling at Marden. The wreckage was cleared and the damaged track was repaired overnight, allowing trains to use the line subject to a temporary speed restriction. The line reopened to traffic at 04:23 on 7 January. One of the wrecked vans caught fire on Monday afternoon. Maidstone and Marden fire engines attended.

== Inquiry ==
On 6 January 1969, the Minister for Transport ordered an inquiry into the accident. The inquiry was conducted by Col J. R. H. Robertson, assisted by Lt Col A. G. Townsend-Rose. The report was published on 18 July 1969. The cause of the accident was found to be driver error on the part of the driver of the passenger train, who failed to observe rule 127 of the British Rail Rule Book:

"The driver MUST... observe and obey all signals ... ... and when owing to fog ... ... the fixed signals are not visible at the usual distance, use every precaution and reduce speed if necessary... ...to enable the train to be stopped should it be at Danger. No fault was found with the signalling system or the track circuits, which were all operating as designed, with the signals reacting to the failed track circuit in the correct manner."
