= Hothfield =

Coordinates: 51.1701°N 0.8190°E

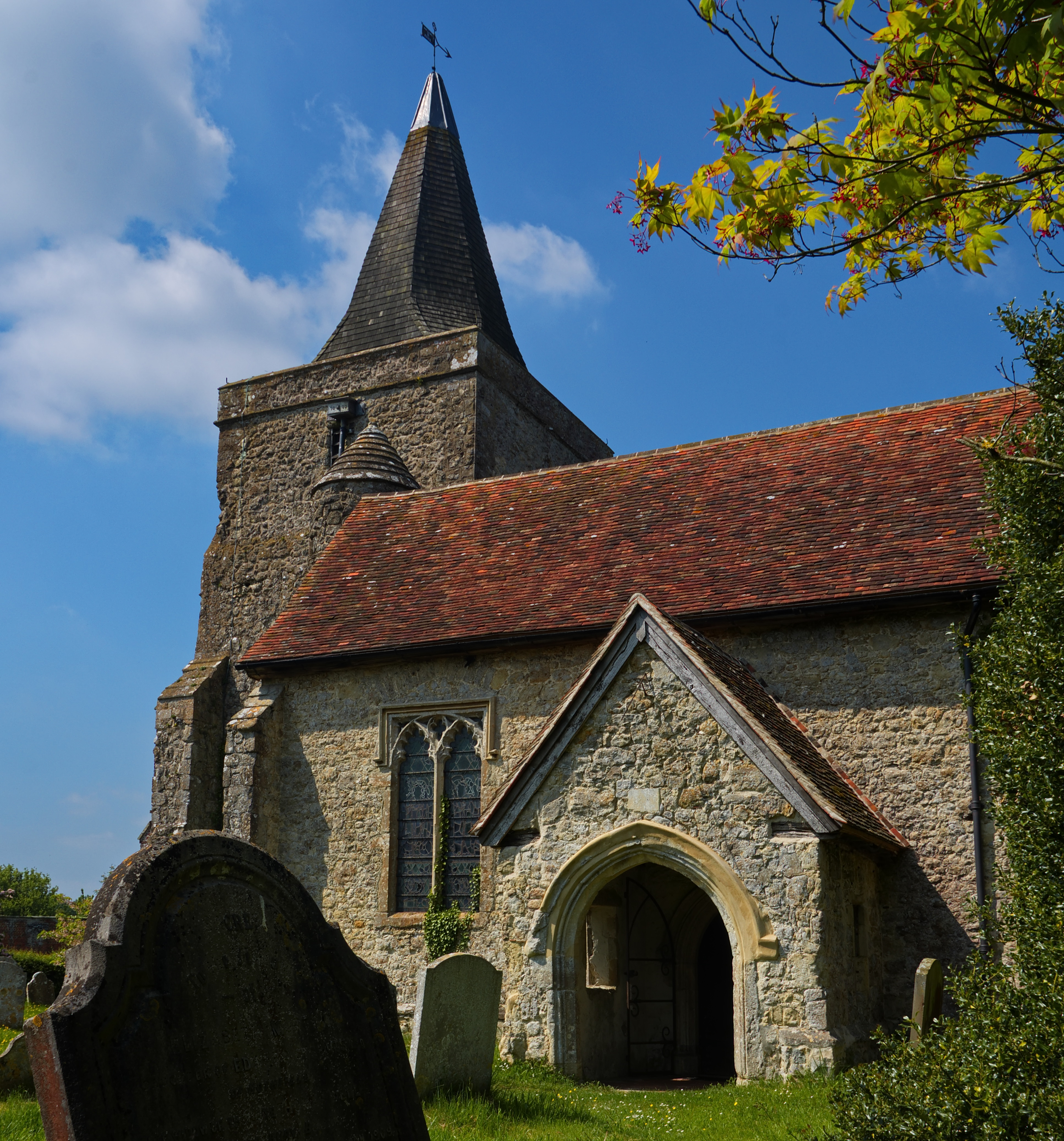
- St Margaret's Church, Hothfield

- Location within Kent
- Area: 9.59 km^{2} (3.70 sq mi)
- Population: 780 (Civil Parish 2011)
  - Density: 81/km^{2} (210/sq mi)
- OS grid reference: TQ970450
- Civil parish: Hothfield
- District: Ashford
- Shire county: Kent
- Region: South East
- Country: England
- Sovereign state: United Kingdom
- Post town: Ashford
- Postcode district: TN26
- Dialling code: 01233
- Police: Kent
- Fire: Kent
- Ambulance: South East Coast
- UK Parliament: Weald of Kent

Hothfield is a village and civil parish in the Ashford Borough of Kent, England and is 3 miles north-west of Ashford on the A20. It is split in two by Hothfield Common.

== Etymology ==
In Kent and East Sussex the Old English term hǣð, which became heath in Modern English, was replaced by an unmutated form, hāð, which, over time, evolved into hoath. The village's name is therefore the old local dialect form of Heathfield.

== Geography ==
In the north west is Hothfield Common, 58 hectares (143 acres) of heathland and lowland valley bogs: a nature reserve managed by Kent Wildlife Trust,

To the immediate south is the private parkland of the former Hothfield House. This area is crossed by the Greensand Way passing the church en route to Godinton House. A small part of the neighbourhood of Ram Lane is in the far northern point of the civil parish. Small tributaries of the West Stour rise in the parish.

== Amenities ==
The village has a shop and post office with internal ATM service. Hothfield Common has a children's playground and a multi-use all-weather games pitch adjacent to the south east and a car park to the north just off the A20. A village community centre, Hothfield Village Hall, is located on the edge of the village. The former school is now a children's centre, named the Bluebells Children Centre, run by Sure Start. It runs parent and child groups and midwife and health visitors drop-in services.

== History ==
The medieval parish church is dedicated to Saint Margaret; it was rebuilt in 1598 after a fire.

Edward Hasted's Topography of Kent (1798) has a substantial amount of information about the history and the then layout of land and settlement.

== Transport ==
The village is approximately 1 kilometre (0.6 mi) south-east of the A20 road, and is south of the M20 with which has a short border to the far north. It is served by the 10X bus service operated by Stagecoach South East, stopping on the junction of Cades Road and Station Road, as well as the 123 bus service stopping on School Road.

It was served by Hothfield railway station on the Maidstone Line from 1884 until 1959. The nearest stations are now Ashford International and Charing.

== See also ==
- Listed buildings in Hothfield
