= Ashford station =

Ashford station may refer to:

- Ashford railway station (Surrey)
- Ashford International railway station, Kent
- Ashford West railway station, Kent
