= Heathlands railway station =

Railway station in Kent, England

Heathlands railway station is a proposed station to serve the Heathlands Garden Community at Lenham Heath, Kent, England. It would be located between the existing Lenham and Charing stations.

== Status ==
The proposed community would have around 5,000 homes. The station is identified in the Maidstone Borough Council Local Plan Review and Homes England proposals.
