= Harrietsham railway station =

Railway station in Kent, England

Coordinates: 51.245°N 0.672°E

Harrietsham
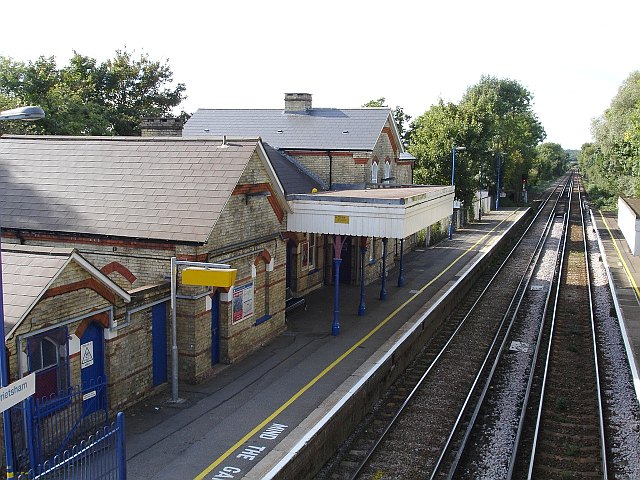

General information
- Location: Harrietsham, Maidstone; England
- Grid reference: TQ866529
- Managed by: Southeastern
- Platforms: 2

Other information
- Station code: HRM
- Classification: DfT category E

History
- Opened: 1 July 1884

Passengers
- 2020/21: ▼21,736
- 2021/22: ▲65,058
- 2022/23: ▲81,042
- 2023/24: ▲90,560
- 2024/25: ▲98,904
Location
Notes
- Passenger statistics from the Office of Rail and Road

Harrietsham railway station serves the rural and industrial village of Harrietsham in Kent, England. It is 47 miles 36 chains (76.4 km) down the line from London Victoria. The station, and all trains serving it, are operated by Southeastern.

== History ==
Harrietsham station opened on 1 July 1884, as part of the London, Chatham and Dover Railway's extension of the line from Maidstone to Ashford West. The goods yard was on the up side. It comprised three sidings, one of which served a goods shed. Freight facilities were withdrawn on 1 May 1961. The signal box closed on 5 November 1972.

== Facilities ==
The ticket office is staffed only during the morning peak period; at other times, a PERTIS 'permit to travel' machine, located at the entrance to the up platform, can be used. There is also a car park with 24 spaces.

== Services ==
All services at Harrietsham are operated by Southeastern using Class 375 and 377 electric multiple units.

The typical off-peak service in trains per hour is:

- 1 tph to London Victoria via Maidstone East
- 1 tph to Ashford International

Additional services call at the station during peak hours, including trains to and from London Charing Cross.

| Preceding station | National Rail | Following station |
|---|---|---|
| Hollingbourne | Southeastern Kent Downs line | Lenham |
