= Heathfield =

Heathfield may refer to:

== Places ==
=== Australia ===
- Heathfield, South Australia
  - Heathfield railway station, Adelaide

=== South Africa ===
- Heathfield, Cape Town, a suburb

=== England ===
- Heathfield, Cambridgeshire
- Heathfield, Croydon, London
- Heathfield, Devon, industrial estate near Bovey Tracey
- Heathfield, East Sussex
  - Heathfield Park, country house
  - Heathfield and Waldron, civil parish
  - Heathfield (Sussex) railway station
  - Heathfield transmitting station
- Heathfield, North Yorkshire
- Heathfield, Somerset
- Heathfield, Twickenham, London, a ward of Richmond upon Thames in Whitton
- Crowcombe Heathfield, Somerset
  - Crowcombe Heathfield railway station

=== Scotland ===
- Heathfield, South Ayrshire, Scotland
  - RAF Heathfield

== People ==
- Heathfield (surname), family name of British origin
- Baron Heathfield, British title, created in 1787
- George Augustus Eliott, 1st Baron Heathfield (1717–1790), British commander during the Great Siege of Gibraltar

== Schools ==
- Heathfield Community College
- Heathfield Community School
- Heathfield Hall, former house in Handsworth, Staffordshire
- Heathfield International School
- Heathfield School, Ascot
- Heathfield School, Pinner
- Heathfield Knoll School, Wolverley
- Heathfield Senior High School, Gateshead

== See also ==
- Hothfield, a place in Kent with the same meaning
