= Lenham railway station =

Railway station in Kent, England

Coordinates: 51.234°N 0.708°E

Lenham
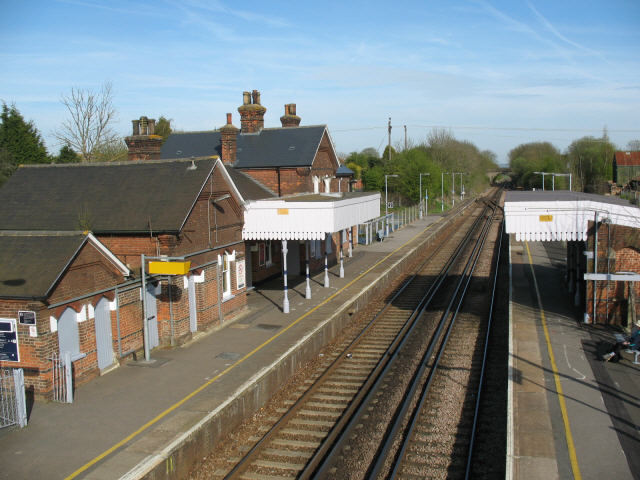

General information
- Location: Lenham, Maidstone; England
- Grid reference: TQ891518
- Managed by: Southeastern
- Platforms: 2

Other information
- Station code: LEN
- Classification: DfT category E

History
- Opened: 1 July 1884

Passengers
- 2020/21: ▼39,288
- 2021/22: ▲87,584
- 2022/23: ▲0.102 million
- 2023/24: ▲0.121 million
- 2024/25: ▲0.131 million
Location
Notes
- Passenger statistics from the Office of Rail and Road

Lenham railway station serves Lenham in Kent, England. It is 49 miles 11 chains (79.1 km) down the line from London Victoria.

The station, and all trains serving it, is/ are operated by Southeastern. The station has two tracks running through and two platforms.

== History ==
Lenham station opened on 1 July 1884 as part of the London, Chatham and Dover Railway's extension of the line from Maidstone to Ashford West. The goods yard comprised four sidings on the down side and one on the up side. One of the down sidings served a goods shed, which was used by the Morello Cheery Works and a local bacon factory.

In 1961, loops were installed in both directions. Freight facilities were withdrawn on 6 January 1969. Although a new signal box was provided in 1961, it closed on 28 May 1984.

A new footbridge replaced the life-expired concrete footbridge spanning the tracks here, completed in early 2010.

== Facilities ==
The station has a ticket office which is staffed during Monday-Saturday mornings only (06:20-13:00). At other times, the station is unstaffed and tickets can be purchased from the self-service ticket machine at the station.

There is a passenger waiting room which is open while the station is staffed as well as passenger help points on each platform.

The station has a small cycle rack at the entrance as well as a chargeable car park which is operated by Saba Parking.

The station has step-free access available to the Ashford although the London bound is only reachable by the use of steps and there is no access between the stations platforms.

== Services ==
All services at Lenham are operated by Southeastern using Class 375 and 377 EMUs.

The typical off-peak service in trains per hour is:

- 1 tph to London Victoria via Maidstone East
- 1 tph to Ashford International

Additional services, including trains to and from London Charing Cross call at the station during the peak hours.

| Preceding station | National Rail | Following station |
|---|---|---|
| Harrietsham | Southeastern Kent Downs line | Charing |

== Connections ==
Stagecoach South East route 10X serves the station.
