= Staplehurst (disambiguation) =

Staplehurst can mean:

- Staplehurst in Kent, England
  - RAF Staplehurst, a World War II airfield in Kent, England
  - Staplehurst railway station in Kent, England
  - Staplehurst rail crash, a 1865 railway accident in Kent, England
- Staplehurst, Nebraska, a small village in the United States
- Staplehurst, Alberta, a community in Canada
