= Headcorn Junction railway station =

Railway station in England

Headcorn Junction

General information
- Location: Headcorn; England
- Coordinates: 51.1657°N 0.6257°E
- Grid reference: TQ 838 439
- Platforms: 1

Other information
- Status: Disused

History
- Original company: Kent and East Sussex Railway
- Post-grouping: Kent and East Sussex Railway

Key dates
- 15 May 1905: Opened
- Between 1924 and 1930: Station rebuilt by Southern Railway
- 4 January 1954: Closed
Location

Headcorn Junction railway station was the Kent and East Sussex Railway's northern terminus. It was adjacent to the South Eastern and Chatham Railway's Headcorn station. It opened in 1905 and closed in January 1954.

== History ==
Headcorn Junction opened on 15 May 1905 with the extension of the Kent and East Sussex Railway (K&ESR) from Tenterden Town to Headcorn. The station was adjacent to the South Eastern and Chatham Railway's (SE&CR) Headcorn station. It was 21.5 miles (34.60 km) from Robertsbridge. Passenger facilities comprised a small waiting room. This had originally stood at Tenterden Town, and was moved to Headcorn Junction when a new brick building was provided at Tenterden Town. The original junction between the K&ESR and SE&CR was on the Ashford side of the station.

In 1926, the Southern Railway, which had taken over the SE&CR in 1923, decided to rebuild their station at Headcorn to provide two through roads with platforms on passing loops. A new platform was provided for the K&ESR and the connection between the two railways was moved to the Tonbridge side of Headcorn station. Work had been completed by 1930. The K&ESR was absorbed into British Railways on 1 January 1948, becoming part of the Southern Region of British Railways. The station, and the line between Headcorn and Tenterden Town, were closed on 4 January 1954. As of 2025 the platform of Headcorn Junction Station still remain although partly overgrown and a third set of stairs from Headcorn station to the disused platforms are still there and accessible.

Preceding station	Disused railways	Following station
Terminus	British Railways; Southern Region; KESR	Frittenden Road
