= Hothfield railway station =

Former railway station in England

Hothfield

General information
- Location: England
- Coordinates: 51.1812°N 0.8328°E
- Grid reference: TQ 980 462
- Platforms: 2

Other information
- Status: Disused

History
- Original company: London, Chatham and Dover Railway
- Pre-grouping: South Eastern and Chatham Railway
- Post-grouping: Southern Railway

Key dates
- 1 July 1884: Station opened
- 25 September 1937: Reduced to unstaffed halt
- 2 November 1959: Closed to passengers
- 22 February 1964: Closed to general freight
Location

Hothfield railway station (later Hothfield Halt) was a railway station on the Maidstone Line at Hothfield, Kent. It was situated between Ashford and Charing stations. The station opened in 1884; it closed to passengers in 1959 and general freight in 1964 although the sidings continued to be used for deliveries of aggregate traffic.

== History ==
Hothfield station was opened by the London, Chatham and Dover Railway on 1 July 1884, when the railway between Maidstone East and Ashford West opened. From 1 January 1899, passenger trains ran to and from the former South Eastern Railway's Ashford station. In 1922, weekday passenger services comprised ten down and nine up trains. Four trains ran in each direction on Sundays. The station was listed as "Hothfield for Westwell". From 6 January 1935, eleven trains served the station daily.

On 25 September 1937, the station was reduced to an unstaffed halt. From 2 July 1939, an hourly service was provided. During the Second World War the station buildings were damaged by enemy action. The station closed to passengers on 2 November 1959, and freight on 22 February 1964, as it was deemed uneconomical to improve the station to cater for electrification of the Maidstone line. but the platforms remained and were used by railway staff until the 1980s. The signal box at Hothfield remained in use until 28 April 1984, and then served as a ground frame until 16 February 1985. Freight facilities comprised four sidings on the down side of the station, one of which served a goods shed. A crane of 1 ton 15 cwt (1,800 kg) capacity was provided.

| Preceding station | Disused railways | Following station |
|---|---|---|
| Ashford West | London, Chatham and Dover Railway; Maidstone Line | Charing |
| Ashford | British Rail; Southern Region; Maidstone Line | Charing |
