= Listed buildings in Hothfield =

Historic structures in Kent, England

Hothfield is a village and civil parish in the Borough of Ashford of Kent, England. It contains one grade I, two grade II* and 29 grade II listed buildings that are recorded in the National Heritage List for England.

This list is based on the information retrieved online from Historic England.

== Key ==
Grade	Criteria
I	Buildings that are of exceptional interest
II*	Particularly important buildings of more than special interest
II	Buildings that are of special interest

== Listing ==
Name	Grade	Location	Type	Completed (Note: The date given is the date used by Historic England as significant for the initial building or that of an important part in the structure's description.)	Date designated	Grid ref. (Note: The grid reference is based on the British national grid reference system, sometimes known as OSGB36, used by the Ordnance Survey.) Geo-coordinates	Notes	Entry number (Note: The "List Entry Number" is a unique number assigned to each listed building and scheduled monument by Historic England.)	Image	Wikidata
Church of St Margaret	I	Bethersden Road			14 February 1967	TQ9696444528; 51°09′58″N 0°48′57″E		1115733	Church of St Margaret More images	Q17529324
Garden House	II	Bethersden Road, TN26 1EP			10 October 1980	TQ9681044642; 51°10′02″N 0°48′49″E		1071490	Upload Photo	Q26326671
The Paddocks	II	Bethersden Road			14 February 1967	TQ9644144204; 51°09′48″N 0°48′29″E		1071491	Upload Photo	Q26326673
The Rectory	II	Bethersden Road			14 February 1967	TQ9684144768; 51°10′06″N 0°48′51″E		1320294	Upload Photo	Q26606308
Wall to Former Kitchen Garden of Hothfield Place	II	Bethersden Road			10 October 1980	TQ9680244555; 51°09′59″N 0°48′49″E		1115708	Upload Photo	Q26409406
Forge Cottage Myrtle Cottage	II	Chapel Lane			10 October 1980	TQ9698846553; 51°11′03″N 0°49′02″E		1362714	Upload Photo	Q26644585
Home Farm Cottage	II	Coach Drive			10 October 1980	TQ9731744912; 51°10′10″N 0°49′16″E		1362643	Upload Photo	Q26644518
Swinford Manor	II*	Godinton Lane, Great Chart, TN23 3FZ, Swinford			10 October 1980	TQ9751543725; 51°09′31″N 0°49′24″E		1115575	Upload Photo	Q17556278
Turners Turners Farmhouse	II	Little Chart Road			14 February 1967	TQ9664745057; 51°10′15″N 0°48′42″E		1071450	Upload Photo	Q26326616
Britton Farmhouse	II	Maidstone Road, Ram Lane			10 October 1980	TQ9679246630; 51°11′06″N 0°48′52″E		1362718	Upload Photo	Q26644589
Granary and Cartshed to North West of Yonsea	II	Maidstone Road			10 October 1980	TQ9848045021; 51°10′12″N 0°50′16″E		1071453	Upload Photo	Q26326620
Oasthouses to South of Yonsea	II	Maidstone Road			10 October 1980	TQ9849944992; 51°10′11″N 0°50′17″E		1071452	Upload Photo	Q26326619
Range of Barns About 50 Metres to North of Yonsea	II	Maidstone Road			10 October 1980	TQ9853745049; 51°10′13″N 0°50′19″E		1071455	Upload Photo	Q26326623
Range of Barns About 50 Metres to West of Yonsea	II	Maidstone Road			10 October 1980	TQ9849645025; 51°10′12″N 0°50′17″E		1071456	Upload Photo	Q26326625
Yonsea	II	Maidstone Road			10 October 1980	TQ9852845010; 51°10′12″N 0°50′18″E		1071451	Upload Photo	Q26326617
Yonsea Bungalow	II	Maidstone Road			10 October 1980	TQ9847745008; 51°10′12″N 0°50′16″E		1071454	Upload Photo	Q26326622
Home Farmhouse	II	Park Drive			10 October 1980	TQ9742944859; 51°10′08″N 0°49′22″E		1362663	Upload Photo	Q26644538
Red Brick Barn to East of Home Farmhouse	II	Park Drive			10 October 1980	TQ9744044882; 51°10′09″N 0°49′22″E		1071458	Upload Photo	Q26326628
Red Brick Barn to North of Home Farmhouse	II	Park Drive			10 October 1980	TQ9742744902; 51°10′09″N 0°49′21″E		1115602	Upload Photo	Q26409305
Red Brick Barn to West of Home Farmhouse	II	Park Drive			10 October 1980	TQ9740744892; 51°10′09″N 0°49′20″E		1071459	Upload Photo	Q26326629
Britton House Stud	II	Ram Lane, TN25 4LS			10 October 1980	TQ9681346659; 51°11′07″N 0°48′53″E		1068648	Upload Photo	Q26321348
Hurst Mill Cottage	II	Ram Lane			10 October 1980	TQ9582546147; 51°10′52″N 0°48′02″E		1362720	Upload Photo	Q26644591
The Mount	II	Ram Lane			10 October 1980	TQ9573846257; 51°10′55″N 0°47′57″E		1068679	Upload Photo	Q26321377
Remains of A Pound in the Grounds of Swinford Manor School	II	Swinford			10 October 1980	TQ9747043694; 51°09′30″N 0°49′21″E		1362665	Upload Photo	Q26644540
Hope Cottage	II	The Bogs			10 October 1980	TQ9666945407; 51°10′27″N 0°48′44″E		1115665	Upload Photo	Q26409363
Former Farm Buildings to Hothfield Place	II	The Granary, The Dovecot And The Old Stables, Church Lane, TN26 1EL			14 February 1967	TQ9692144486; 51°09′57″N 0°48′55″E		1362642	Upload Photo	Q26644517
25 and 26, the Street	II	25 and 26, The Street			10 October 1980	TQ9702945040; 51°10′14″N 0°49′01″E		1115569	Upload Photo	Q26409278
High House	II	5, The Street			14 February 1967	TQ9693644794; 51°10′07″N 0°48′56″E		1320355	Upload Photo	Q26606360
Institute Cottage	II	27, The Street			14 February 1967	TQ9700345078; 51°10′16″N 0°49′00″E		1071460	Upload Photo	Q26326630
Kings Head	II	The Street, TN26 1ES			10 October 1980	TQ9704145024; 51°10′14″N 0°49′02″E		1362664	Kings Head More images	Q26644539
1-9, West Street	II	1-9, West Street			10 October 1980	TQ9697045162; 51°10′18″N 0°48′59″E		1320396	Upload Photo	Q26606397

== See also ==
- Grade I listed buildings in Kent
- Grade II* listed buildings in Kent

== Sources ==
- Newman, John (2012) [1969], Kent: West and the Weald, The Buildings of England, New Haven and London: Yale University Press, ISBN 978-0-300-18509-6
