= St Peter's and St Paul's Church, Headcorn =

Coordinates: 51.167743°N 0.618756°E

St Peter's and St Paul's church
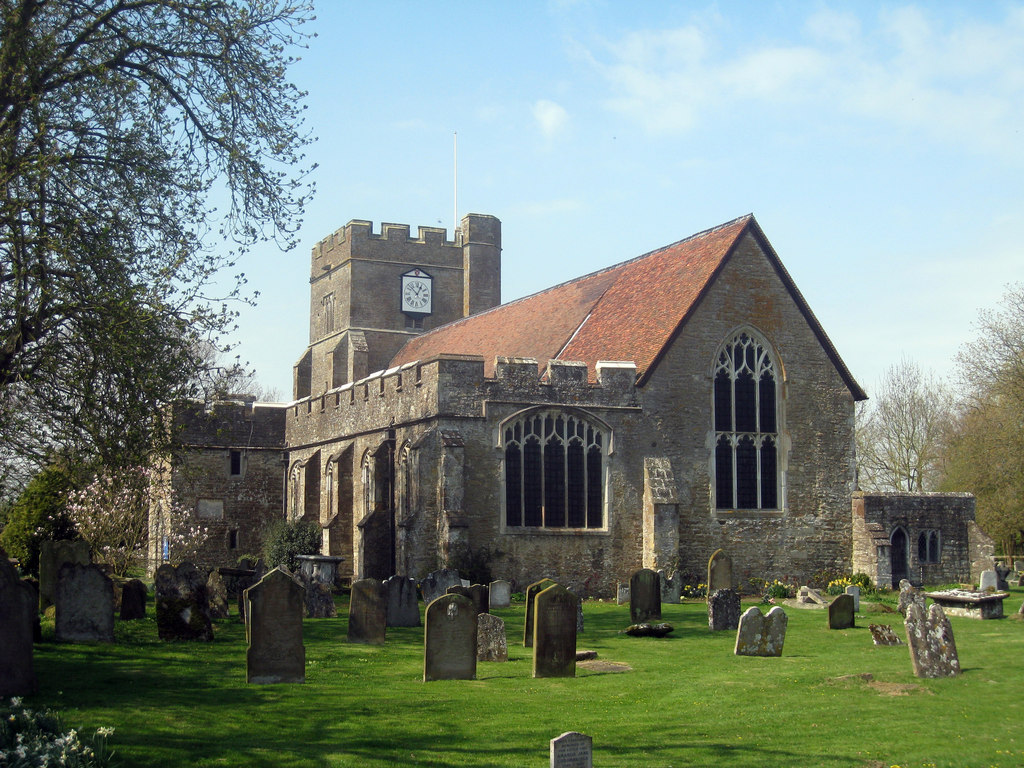

- Location within Kent
- OS grid reference: TQ 83182 44204
- Location: Headcorn, Kent
- Country: England
- Denomination: Anglican

History
- Status: Parish church

Architecture
- Functional status: Active
- Heritage designation: Grade I
- Designated: 26 April 1968
- Completed: 13th century, 14th and 15th centuries

Administration
- Province: Canterbury
- Diocese: Canterbury
- Archdeaconry: Maidstone
- Deanery: The Weald

St Peter's and St Paul's Church is a parish church in Headcorn, Kent dedicated to saints Peter and Paul. It was begun in the 13th century. The church is a Grade I listed building.

== Building ==
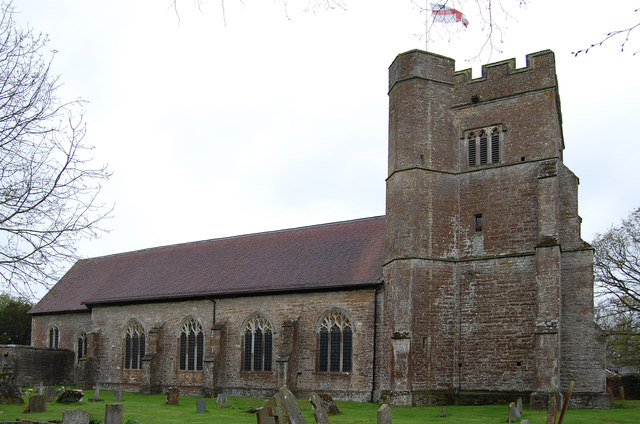
West tower and north side of the church

Construction of the church was begun in the 13th century and continued during the 14th and 15th centuries. The church is constructed of Bethersden marble and has plain tiled roofs.

The late 14th-century west tower comprises three stages with buttresses on the external corners and a taller attached polygonal stair turret on the north-east corner. String courses separate each stage and a battlemented parapet forms the top of the walls on each side. The west side contains a three-lighted, cinquefoil-headed and traceried window in the first stage positioned above the small west door. The second stage contains small rectangular windows on the façades and the third stage contains two- or three-lighted belfry windows on each side with either trefoil or quatrefoil decoration.

The nave is probably 14th-century and is flanked on the south side by a late 14th-century aisle with its attached porch of a similar age. The parapets of the aisle and porch are battlemented. The three aisle windows are cinquefoil-topped and the porch inner doorway is of Bethesden marble. The north wall of the nave contains four three-lighted traceried windows separated by buttresses. The chancel is 13th century with the windows replaced probably in the late 14th century or in the 15th century. The east end is gabled with a tall window of two stacked groups of three cinquefoil-topped lights. Abutting the south side of the chancel is the south chapel which also dates from the 14th century. Four two-lighted windows alternate with buttresses on the south chapel wall and the east end contains a five-lighted traceried window.

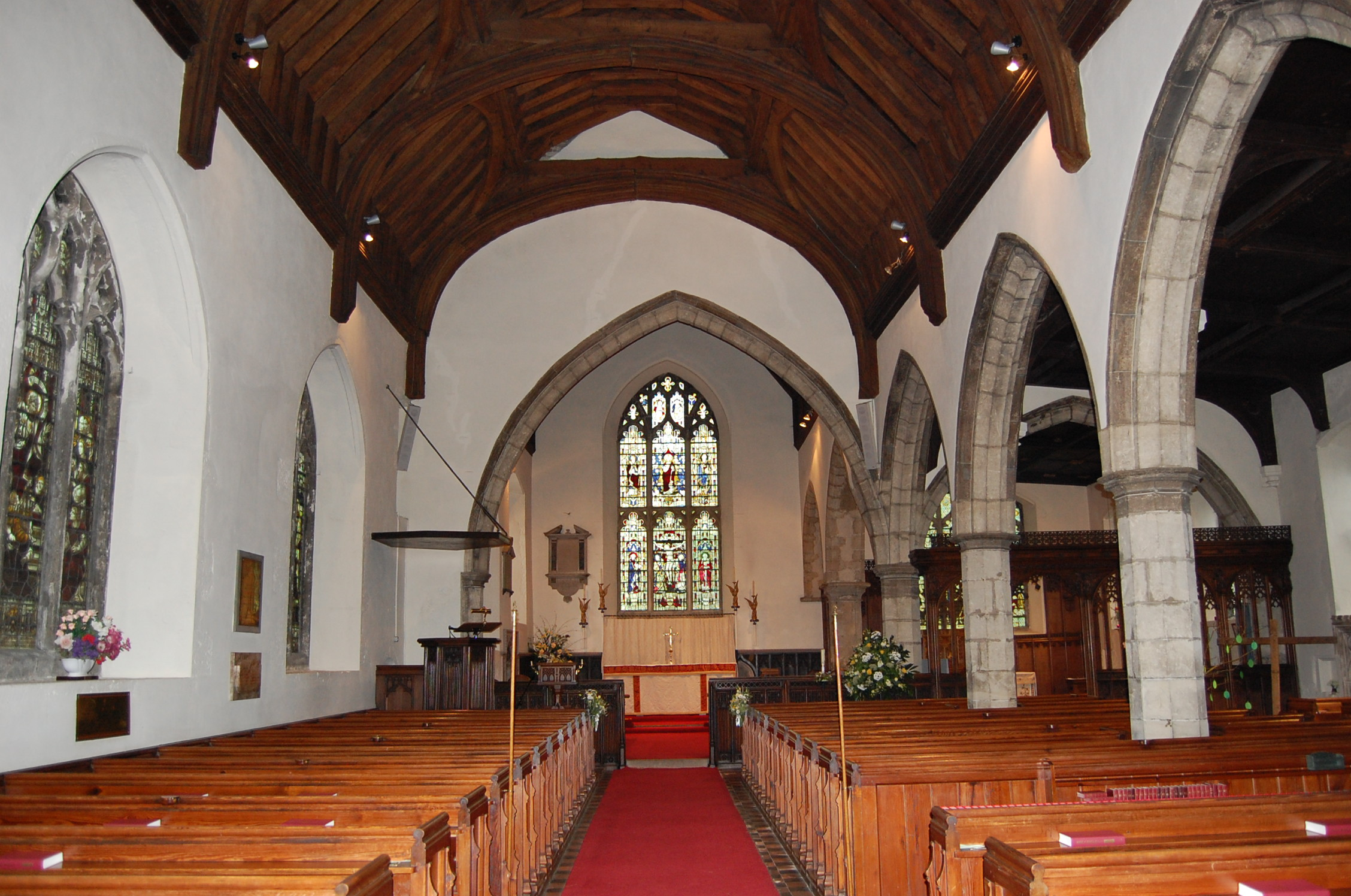
Nave looking east

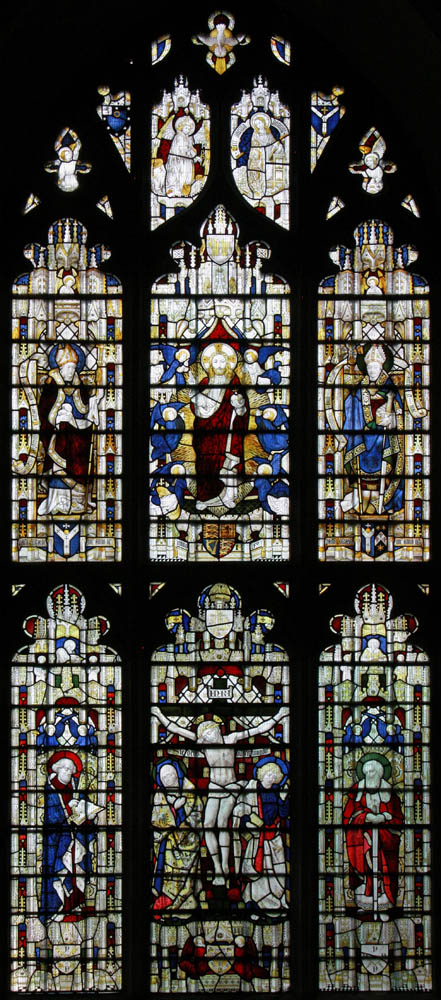
East window

Internally, the nave and south aisle are separated by an arcade of five pointed arches on octagonal columns with bases and capitals in Bethesden marble. The arch between chancel and nave and between south aisle and south chapel are similar. An arcade of two bays divides the chancel from the south chapel. The collar-rafter roof to the nave is late 14th century or early 15th century with seven moulded trusses. The pitched roof of the chancel is boarded and the roofs of the aisle and chapel are flat and boarded.

The 15th-century font is octagonal with carved sides. Piscina are located in the south walls at the east end of the aisle and the east end of the chapel and in the chancel. The screen is partly 16th century with linenfold panelling which also features on the late 19th century pulpit.

== Monuments and memorials ==
The churchyard contains a number of Grade II listed 18th-century table tombs.

== See also ==
- Grade I listed buildings in Maidstone
