= Frittenden Road railway station =

Former railway station in England

Coordinates: 51.1371°N 0.6326°E

Frittenden Road
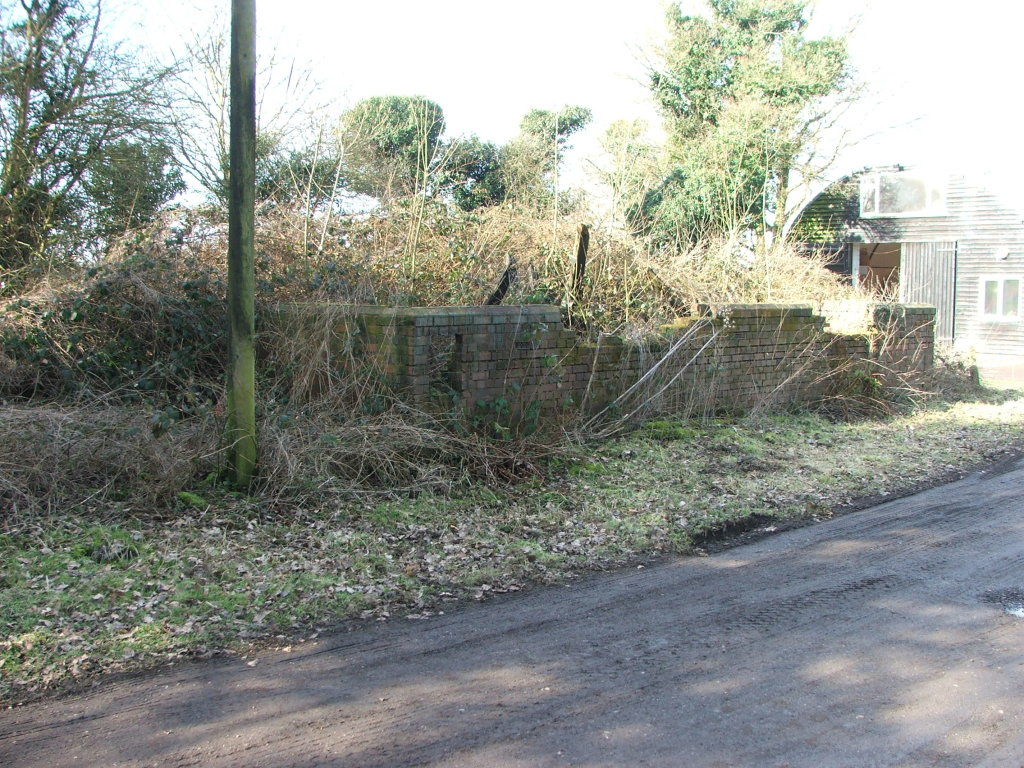
- The station building's brick base in 2009

General information
- Location: Headcorn, Ashford; England
- Grid reference: TQ842408
- Platforms: 1

Other information
- Status: Disused

History
- Pre-grouping: Kent and East Sussex Railway
- Post-grouping: Southern Region of British Railways

Key dates
- 15 May 1905: Station opened
- 4 January 1954: Station closed
Location

Frittenden Road was a railway station on the Kent and East Sussex Railway which closed in January 1954. The wooden station building lay derelict for years and was destroyed by fire in October 2003.

As of 2012 most of the building's brick base still survives, and the general shape of the platform is still evident but much overgrown. The site is used by a joinery business whose premises straddle the trackbed immediately to the north of the old station. As of 2025, the brick remains of the old station still remain despite another fire in the surrounding area the building to the east of the brick remains is a factory.

| Preceding station | Disused railways | Following station |
|---|---|---|
| Headcorn Junction | British Railways; Southern Region; KESR | Biddenden |
