= Marden railway station =

Railway station in Kent, England

Marden
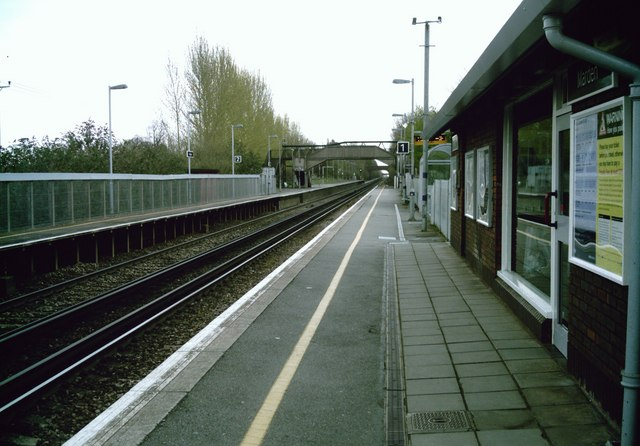
- Marden station

General information
- Location: Marden, Borough of Maidstone; England
- Coordinates: 51.175°N 0.493°E
- Grid reference: TQ743447
- Manager: Southeastern
- Platforms: 2

Other information
- Station code: MRN
- Classification: DfT category E

Key dates
- 31 August 1842: Opened

Passengers
- 2021/22: ▲0.334 million
- 2022/23: ▲0.407 million
- 2023/24: ▲0.446 million
- 2024/25: ▲0.486 million
- 2025/26: ▲0.509 million
Location
Notes
- Passenger statistics from the Office of Rail and Road

Marden railway station is on the South Eastern Main Line in England, serving the village of Marden in the borough of Maidstone, Kent. It is 39 miles 31 chains (63.4 km) down the line from London Charing Cross. The station and all trains that serve the station are operated by Southeastern. The station is often referred to as Marden (Kent) to distinguish it from similarly named villages across England.

== History ==
The station was opened by the South Eastern Railway on 31 August 1842, when the line was extended from Tonbridge to Headcorn. It was built to serve local goods traffic, particularly the transport of fruit from the orchards surrounding Marden.

The goods shed was designed so that wagons could not pass through it. The yard was expanded in 1908, adding an additional siding. The station was completely revamped in 1961 in preparation for the electrification of the South East Main line, including an additional footbridge.

== Facilities ==
Along with similar sized stations along the South East Main Line, the ticket office is only staffed part-time. A ticket machine is available for other times.

== Accidents and incidents ==
At 20:42 on 4 January 1969 there was a collision between a down electric passenger train (formed of 2 x 4CEP units) and a down parcels train to the west of Marden station. Four people were killed. The cause was the driver of the passenger train missing a signal in fog and passing it at danger. Local farmer David Winch of Brook Farm, along with his employees, worked for fourteen hours assisting in the rescue operation. They used their tractors and trailers to ferry the injured across muddy fields from the crash site to waiting ambulances. The ambulance officer in charge at the time, Stanley Skinner, was awarded a British Empire Medal in recognition of his role.

On 5 September 2012, an up passenger train caught fire at Marden. The blaze was under control within half an hour. Passengers were evacuated and services between Tonbridge and Ashford were disrupted.

== Services ==
All services at Marden are operated by Southeastern using Class 375 EMUs.

The typical off-peak service in trains per hour is:

- 2 tph to London Charing Cross
- 1 tph to Dover Priory
- 1 tph to Ramsgate via Canterbury West

Additional services, including trains to and from London Cannon Street and Ramsgate via Deal call at the station during the peak hours.

| Preceding station | National Rail | Following station |
|---|---|---|
| Paddock Wood | Southeastern South Eastern Main Line | Staplehurst |
