= Pluckley railway station =

Railway station in Kent, England

Coordinates: 51.156°N 0.747°E

Pluckley
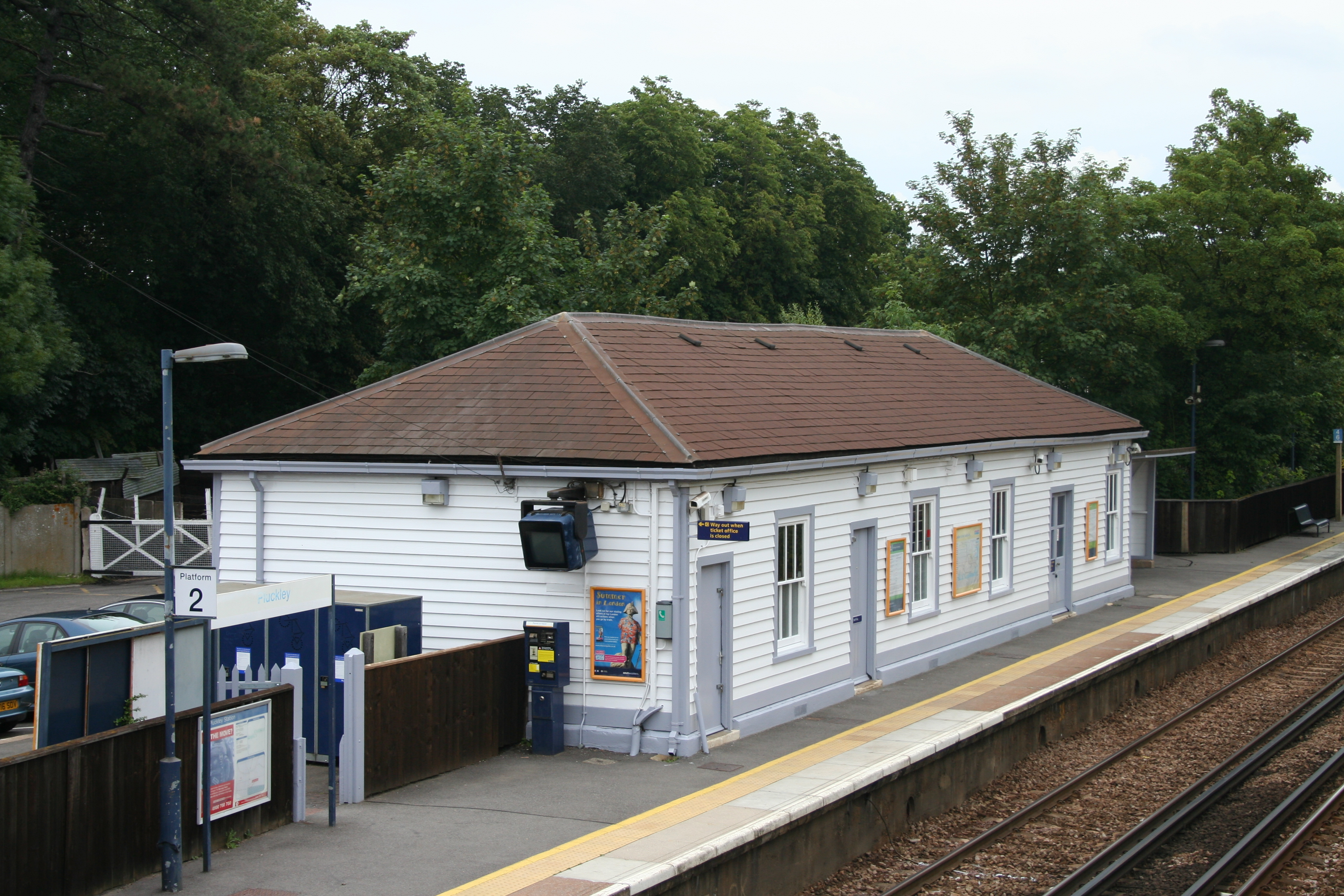

General information
- Location: Pluckley, Borough of Ashford; England
- Grid reference: TQ922432
- Manager: Southeastern
- Platforms: 2

Other information
- Station code: PLC
- Classification: DfT category E

History
- Opened: 1 December 1842

Passengers
- 2020/21: ▼28,462
- 2021/22: ▲69,456
- 2022/23: ▲92,672
- 2023/24: ▲0.109 million
- 2024/25: ▲0.115 million
Location
Notes
- Passenger statistics from the Office of Rail and Road

Pluckley railway station is on the South Eastern Main Line in England, serving the village of Pluckley, Kent, which is approximately 1.2 miles (2 km) to the north. It is 50 miles 35 chains (81.2 km) down the line from London Charing Cross. The station and all trains that serve the station are operated by Southeastern.

== Facilities ==
The station features staggered platforms, whereby the 'up' (London-bound) platform is mostly west of the eastbound platform (on which the station buildings are situated). A footbridge links the platforms.

The ticket office is staffed only part-time; at other times a ticket vending machine is available.

== History ==
The station opened with this section of the line by the South Eastern Railway on 1 December 1842, when the line was extended from Headcorn to Ashford. The first train passed through the station on this date at 12.05pm to cheers from the local crowd. It was originally built to serve Pluckley Brick & Tile Works to the west of the station, and subsequently used as a freight depot for the Southwark Manure Company, transporting horse manure from London to use on Kent farms.

Goods services closed on 20 September 1965, and the signal box was taken out of service on 17 December 1967. The station buildings have mostly survived unaltered from their original construction.

== Services ==
All services at Pluckley are operated by Southeastern using Class 375 EMUs.

The typical off-peak service in trains per hour is:

- 1 tph to London Charing Cross
- 1 tph to Ramsgate via Canterbury West

Additional services, including trains to and from London Cannon Street, Dover Priory and Ramsgate via Deal call at the station during the peak hours.

Preceding station	National Rail	Following station
Headcorn	Southeastern South Eastern Main Line	Ashford International
