= Lenham Heath =

Hamlet in Kent, England

Coordinates: 51°12′52″N 0°44′25″E

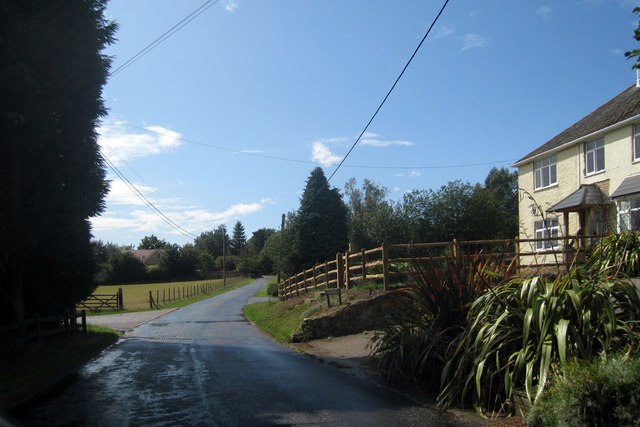
- Lenham Heath Road

- Location within Kent
- OS grid reference: TQ910500
- Civil parish: Lenham
- District: Maidstone
- Shire county: Kent
- Region: South East
- Country: England
- Sovereign state: United Kingdom
- Post town: Maidstone
- Postcode district: ME17
- Police: Kent
- Fire: Kent
- Ambulance: South East Coast
- UK Parliament: Faversham and Mid Kent

Lenham Heath is a hamlet in Kent, situated on the southern edge of the North Downs, halfway between Maidstone and Ashford. grid reference TQ910500.

The road through Lenham Heath runs parallel, and close to High Speed 1 and the M20 motorway. The Stour Valley Walk passes through the community.

== Transportation ==
- Heathlands railway station
