= Headcorn railway station =

Railway station in Kent, England

Coordinates: 51°09′56.70″N 00°37′37.89″E

Headcorn
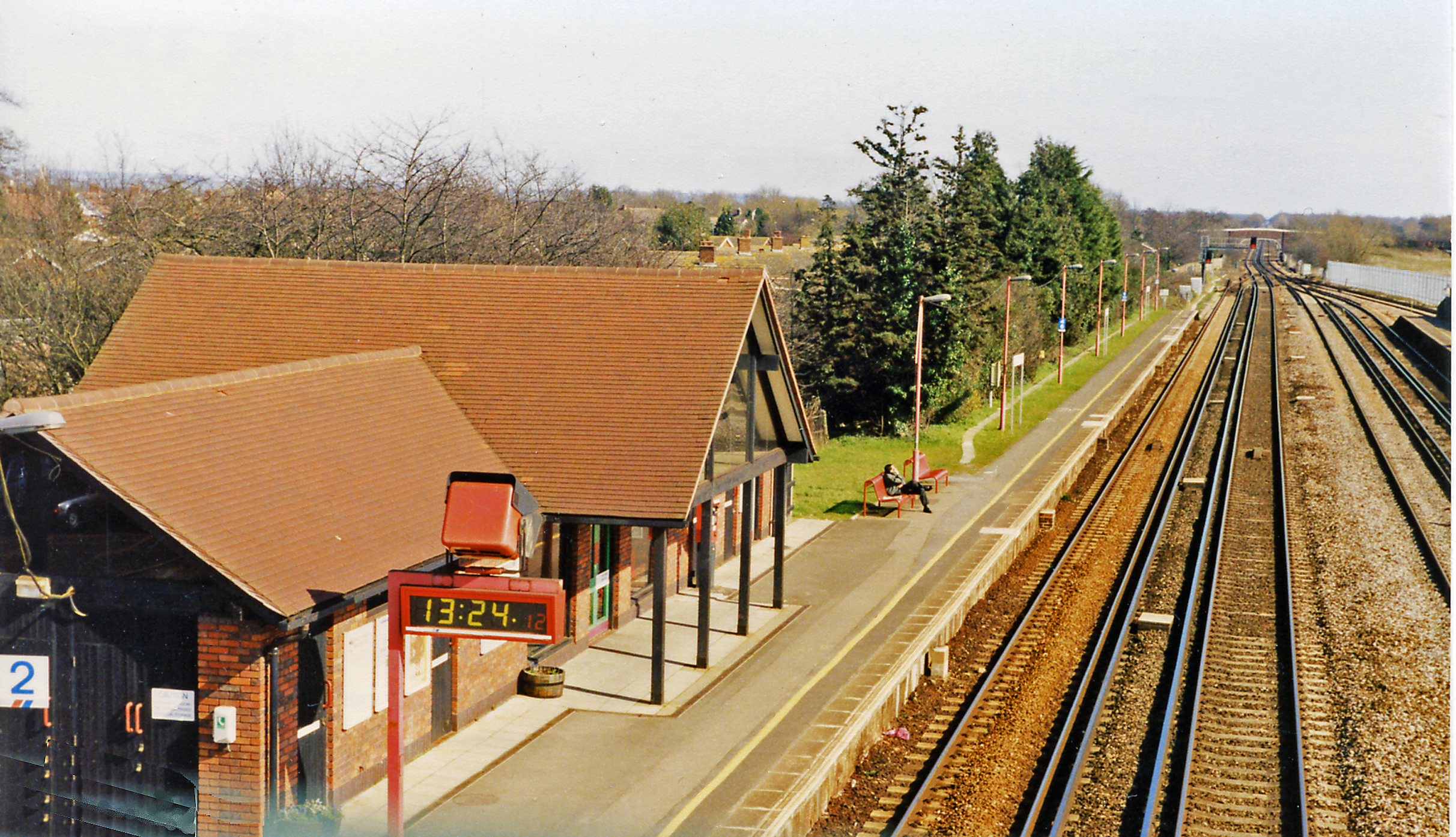

General information
- Location: Headcorn, Borough of Maidstone; England
- Grid reference: TQ837439
- Manager: Southeastern
- Platforms: 2

Other information
- Station code: HCN
- Classification: DfT category D

Key dates
- 31 August 1842: Opened
- 19 May 1905: Opening of the KESR
- 1924–1930: Remodelled
- 4 January 1954: Closure of the KESR
- 2 April 1962: Goods services withdrawn
- 1988–1989: Rebuilt

Passengers
- 2020/21: ▼0.108 million
- 2021/22: ▲0.361 million
- 2022/23: ▲0.468 million
- 2023/24: ▲0.537 million
- 2024/25: ▲0.578 million
Location
Notes
- Passenger statistics from the Office of Rail and Road

Headcorn railway station is on the South Eastern Main Line in England, serving the village of Headcorn, Kent. It is 45 miles 20 chains (72.8 km) down the line from London Charing Cross . The station and all trains that serve the station are operated by Southeastern.

Headcorn was, until January 1954, the northern terminus of the Kent & East Sussex Railway although their platform was named Headcorn Junction.

== History ==
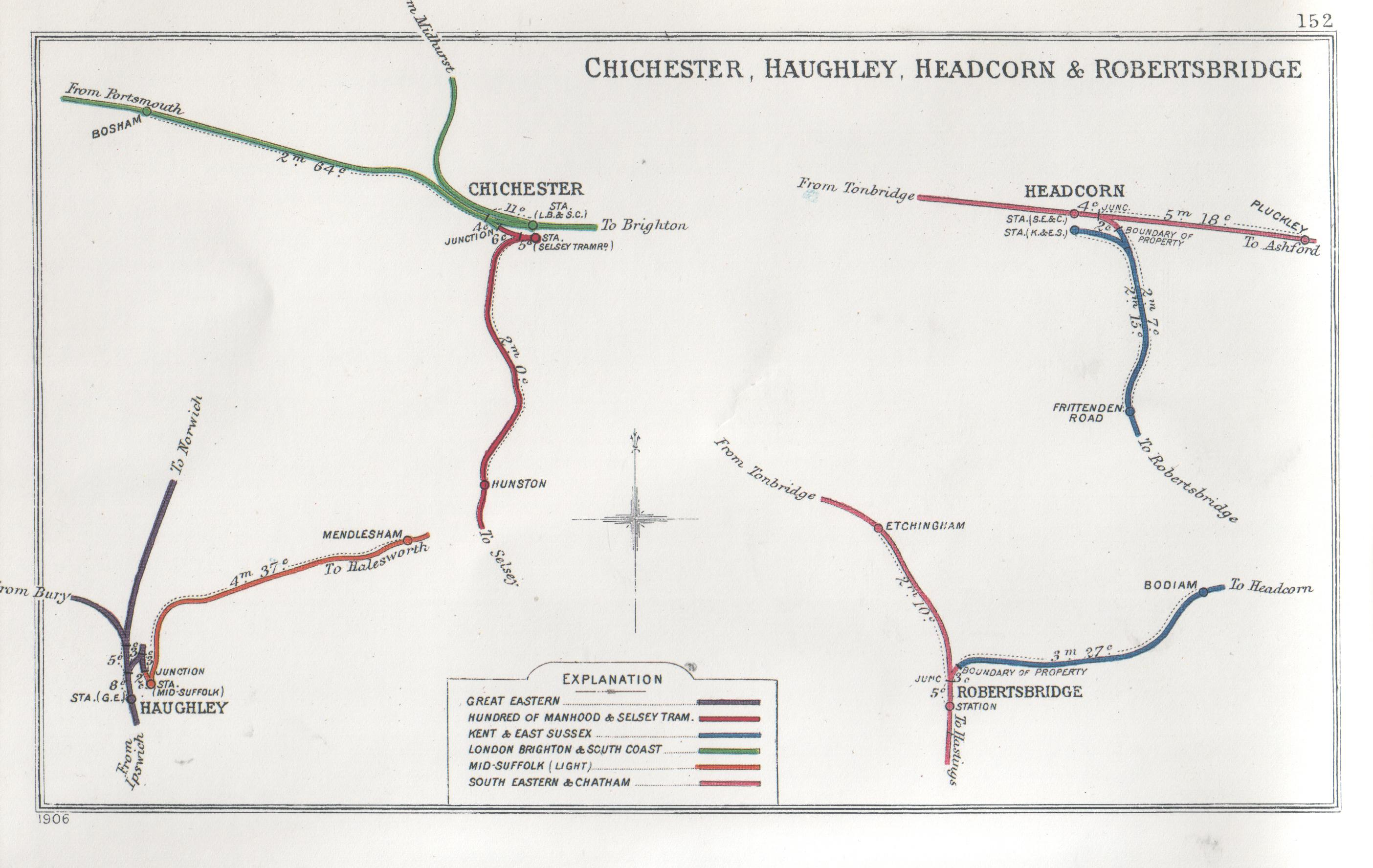
A 1914 Railway Clearing House map of lines around Headcorn railway station, note the KESR.

Headcorn station was opened on 31 August 1842 as part of the extension of the South Eastern Railway's (SER) main line from Tonbridge. In common with other SER stations outside the London area, staggered platforms and a simple single-storey wooden clapboard station building were provided at Headcorn. The SER's line was opened to Ashford by December 1842, to Folkestone by December 1843 and finally to Dover by February 1844. A bridge between Headcorn and Staplehurst was the scene of an accident in 1865 involving Charles Dickens; a rail had been removed by a ganger mistaken as to the day, and the Staplehurst rail crash resulted.

In 1905, the station became the northern terminus of Colonel Stephens' Kent & East Sussex Railway, the KESR's tracks entering Headcorn via a siding on the Ashford side of the station. The KESR had its own long platform to the rear of the Up main line platform, and a corrugated iron building was moved here from the KESR's Tenterden Town station. The station, known as Headcorn Junction by the KESR, was remodelled between 1924 and 1930 by the Southern Railway (SR), with the addition of two new fast lines through the station. This involved the demolition of the main line Up platform, its reconstruction opposite the Down platform, and the moving of the KESR's connection to the main line to the west side of the station. A new concrete KESR platform was provided here facing on a curved alignment.

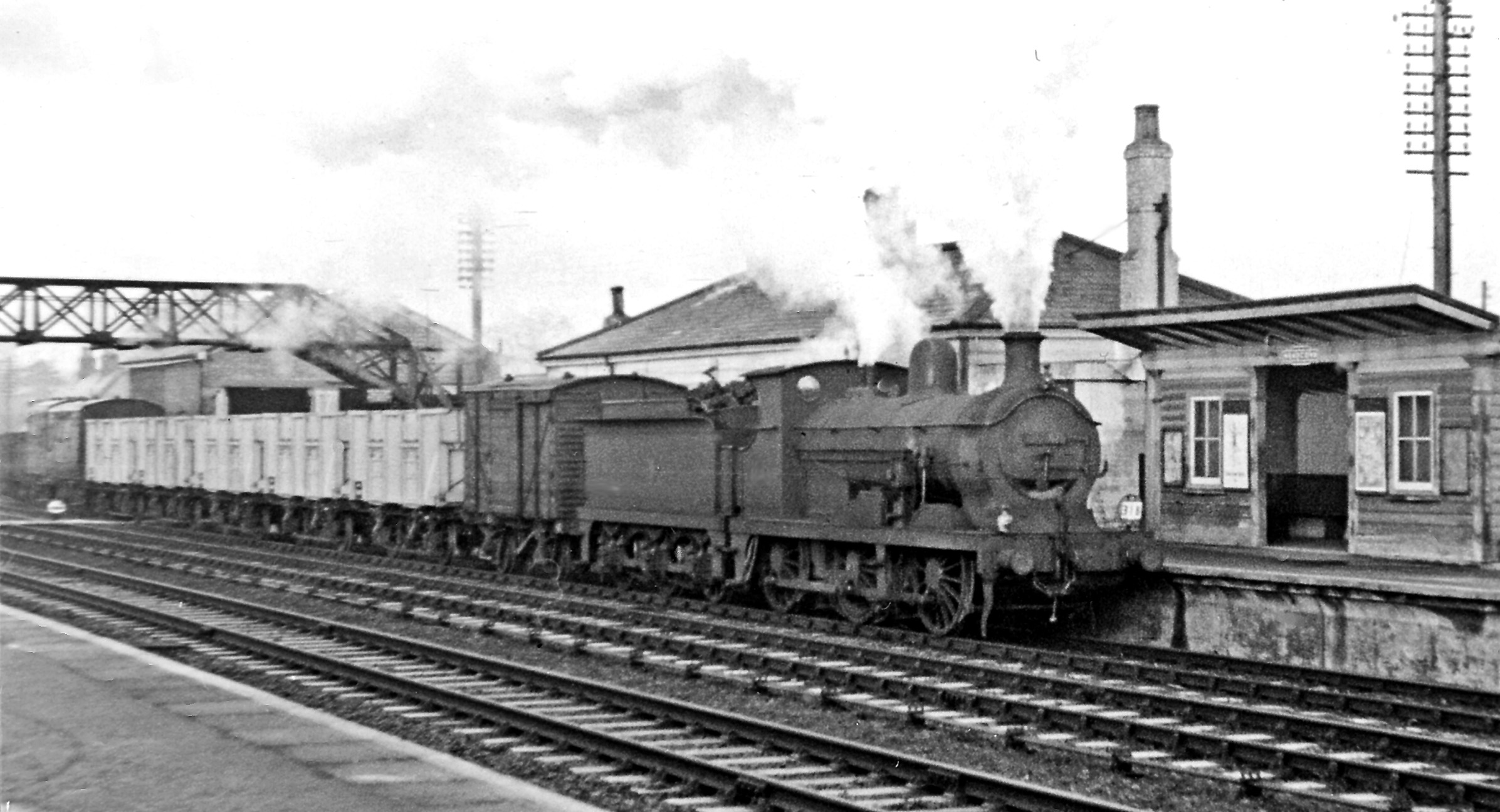
0-6-0 on goods in 1954

The remodelling included a footbridge across the station and new signal box for the main line and an SR signal for the KESR branch. A connection was also provided between KESR metals and the SR Up loop line on the London side of Headcorn station, the KESR's facilities consisting by now of two loops and a siding.

Following a decline in passenger and freight traffic, the KESR between Headcorn and Tenterden was closed to all traffic in January 1954. Goods facilities were withdrawn from Headcorn in 1962, and the goods yard became a car park. The SER's original buildings however survived until 1988 when they were swept away by British Rail as part of a modernisation scheme. A new red-brick station building was officially opened on 11 May 1989 by Ann Widdecombe, then MP for Maidstone and The Weald constituency; shelters were provided for the platforms. In 1994, a new freight loop was built for Channel Tunnel freight services.

== Services ==
All services at Headcorn are operated by Southeastern using Class 375 EMUs.

The typical off-peak service in trains per hour is:

- 2 tph to London Charing Cross
- 1 tph to Dover Priory
- 1 tph to Ramsgate via Canterbury West

Additional services, including trains to and from London Cannon Street and Ramsgate via Deal call at the station during the peak hours.

Preceding station	National Rail	Following station
Staplehurst	Southeastern South Eastern Main Line	Pluckley or Ashford International
	Disused railways	
Terminus	British Rail Southern Region Kent & East Sussex Railway	Frittenden Road
