= Heathfield (surname) =

Heathfield is an English surname. Notable people with this surname include the following:

- Adrian Heathfield, English writer, son of Peter and Betty
- Betty Heathfield (1927–2006), English left-wing activist, wife of Peter
- Donald Heathfield, KGB agent
- Peter Heathfield (1929–2010), English trade unionist, husband of Betty
- Simon Heathfield (born 1967), British Anglican priest
- Tom Heathfield, British cricketer

== Other ==
- Baron Heathfield, British title, created in 1787
- Thomas Heathfield Carrick (1802–1874), English portrait miniature painter
