= Charing railway station =

Railway station in Kent, England

Coordinates: 51.208°N 0.790°E

Charing
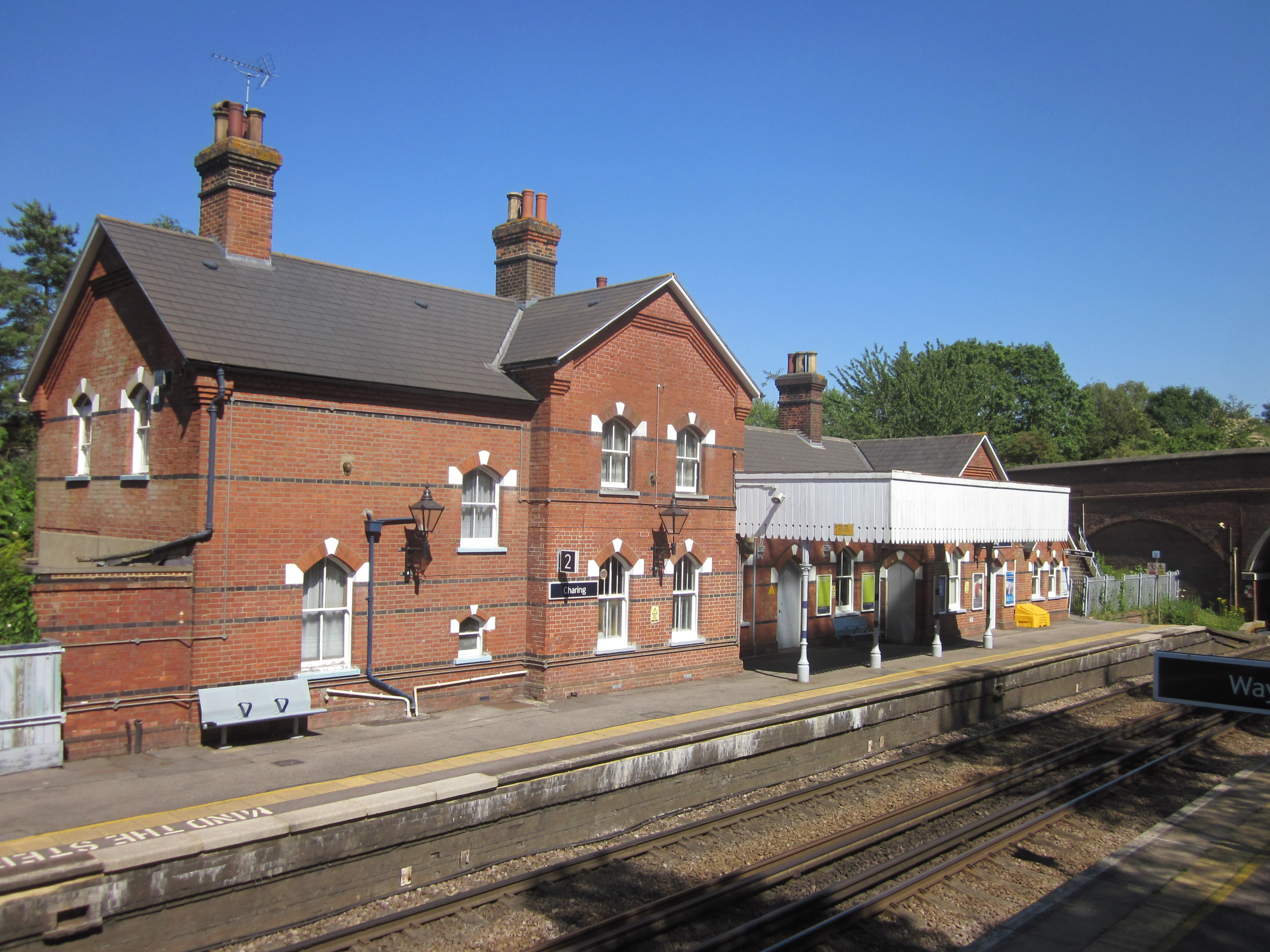
- Main building, platform 2 and road bridge in 2012

General information
- Location: Charing, Ashford; England
- Grid reference: TQ950491
- Managed by: Southeastern
- Platforms: 2

Other information
- Station code: CHG
- Classification: DfT category E

Key dates
- 1 July 1884: Opened
- 9 October 1961: Electrified
- 14 April 1984: Signal box closed

Passengers
- 2020/21: ▼26,234
- 2021/22: ▲60,508
- 2022/23: ▲75,588
- 2023/24: ▲89,516
- 2024/25: ▲94,218
Location
Notes
- Passenger statistics from the Office of Rail and Road

Charing railway station serves the village of Charing in Kent, England. It is 53 miles 11 chains (85.5 km) down the line from London Victoria. The station, and all trains serving it, is operated by Southeastern.

The ticket office is staffed only during part of the day; at other times a PERTIS 'permit to travel' machine, located outside the station building on the 'down' side, suffices.

The next station eastwards (towards Ashford) used to be Hothfield; however, it was closed in 1959, although it remained a 'request' stop for railway staff throughout the 1960s.

== History ==
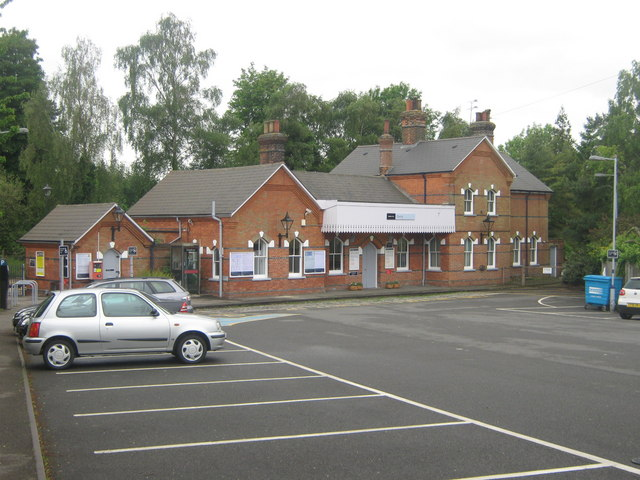
Main entrance in 2009.

The station was opened on 1 July 1884, as part of the London, Chatham and Dover Railway (LCDR) extension to Ashford West of the 1874 line to Maidstone, which itself was a branch off the LCDR's Sevenoaks branch of 1862, which joined the LCDR mainline of 1840 at Swanley. In the wake of 1955 British Rail Modernisation plan, the "Kent Coast Electrification" scheme saw the suburban electrification of the previous Southern Railway extended from Maidstone East through to Ashford. The goods yard comprised five sidings on the down side and one on the up side. It was taken over for military use during World War II. Electrification also saw the addition of a footbridge, but by 16 May 1964 freight operations ceased. Charing's signal box closed on 14 April 1984, when the upgraded Maidstone East Panel took control of the whole line.

== Services ==
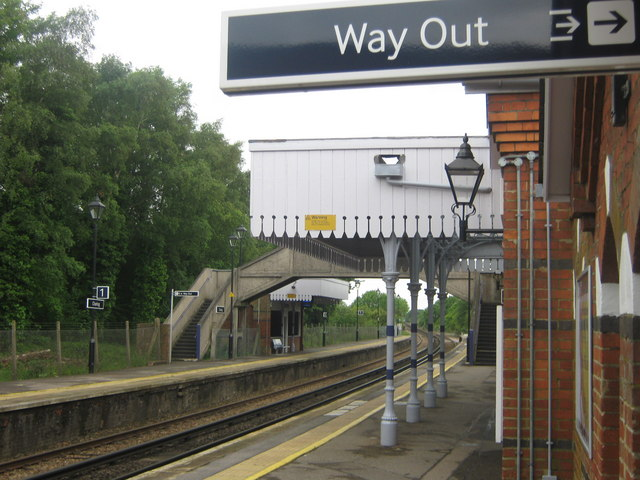
Platform 1 seen from platform 2.

All services at Charing are operated by Southeastern using Class 375 and 377 EMUs.

The typical off-peak service in trains per hour is:

- 1 tph to London Victoria via Maidstone East
- 1 tph to Ashford International

Additional services, including trains to and from London Charing Cross call at the station during the peak hours.

Preceding station	National Rail	Following station
Lenham	Southeastern Kent Downs line	Ashford International
	Disused railways	
Lenham	British Rail Southern Region Maidstone line	Hothfield
