= Staplehurst railway station =

Railway station in Kent, England

Coordinates: 51.171°N 0.550°E

Staplehurst
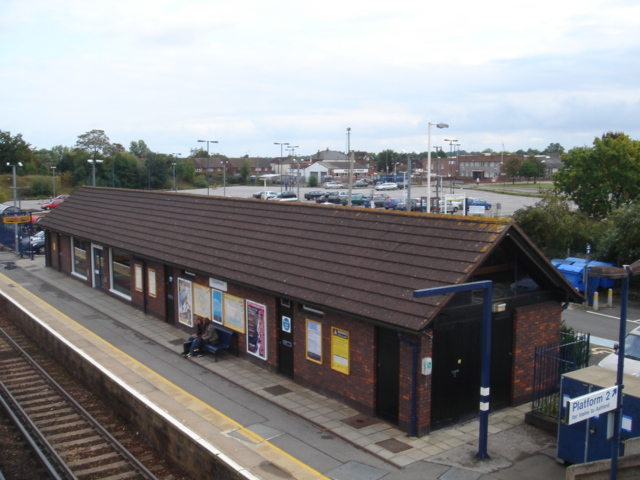

General information
- Location: Staplehurst, Borough of Maidstone; England
- Grid reference: TQ783444
- Manager: Southeastern
- Platforms: 2

Other information
- Station code: SPU
- Classification: DfT category C2

History
- Opened: 31 August 1842

Passengers
- 2020/21: ▼0.152 million
- 2021/22: ▲0.474 million
- 2022/23: ▲0.612 million
- 2023/24: ▲0.688 million
- 2024/25: ▲0.731 million
Location
Notes
- Passenger statistics from the Office of Rail and Road

Staplehurst railway station is on the South Eastern Main Line in England, serving the village of Staplehurst, Kent. It is 41 miles 70 chains (67.4 km) down the line from London Charing Cross . The station and all trains that serve the station are operated by Southeastern.

The station opened in August 1842. It is well known for the Staplehurst rail crash on 9 June 1865 on which Charles Dickens was a passenger.

== History ==
The station was opened by the South Eastern Railway on 31 August 1842, when the line was extended from Tonbridge to Headcorn. The platforms were widened in 1889. A footbridge over the platforms was installed in 1961, in preparation for the electrification of the South Eastern Main Line.

A coal depot was established at Staplehurst in September 1965. All goods facilities were withdrawn on 4 October 1971.

== Facilities ==
Staplehurst is located in the north of the urban area on the A229 road which runs from Chatham to Hastings via Maidstone. The ticket office is located on the London-bound platform 1. A passenger-operated self-service ticket machine is located next to the station.

The station is used by commuters to London from Cranbrook, Sissinghurst and Hawkhurst, which have no stations of their own. Arriva Southern Counties bus 5 links these three settlements to the station.

== Services ==
All services at Staplehurst are operated by Southeastern using Class 375 EMUs.

The typical off-peak service in trains per hour is:

- 2 tph to London Charing Cross
- 1 tph to Dover Priory
- 1 tph to Ramsgate via Canterbury West

Additional services, including trains to and from London Cannon Street and Ramsgate via Deal call at the station during the peak hours.

Preceding station	National Rail	Following station
Marden	Southeastern South Eastern Main Line	Headcorn

== Incidents ==
The stretch of line near the station which crosses the River Beult was the site of a fatal train accident on 9 June 1865, which killed ten people and injured forty. This accident is well known in literary circles as Charles Dickens was on the stricken train and survived. The accident left Dickens very anxious about rail travel.

On 15 September 1940, during the Battle of Britain, a Hurricane piloted by Belgian Georges Doutrepont crashed into the station. This also killed the 18 year old station clerk, Charles Ashdown.

On 21 January 1960, the up platform buildings were destroyed by fire. They were replaced by a modern construction.

On 14 September 1996, a train derailed at the station. The cause of the accident was excess speed.
