= Headcorn =

Village in Kent, England

Coordinates: 51.169549°N 0.620341°E

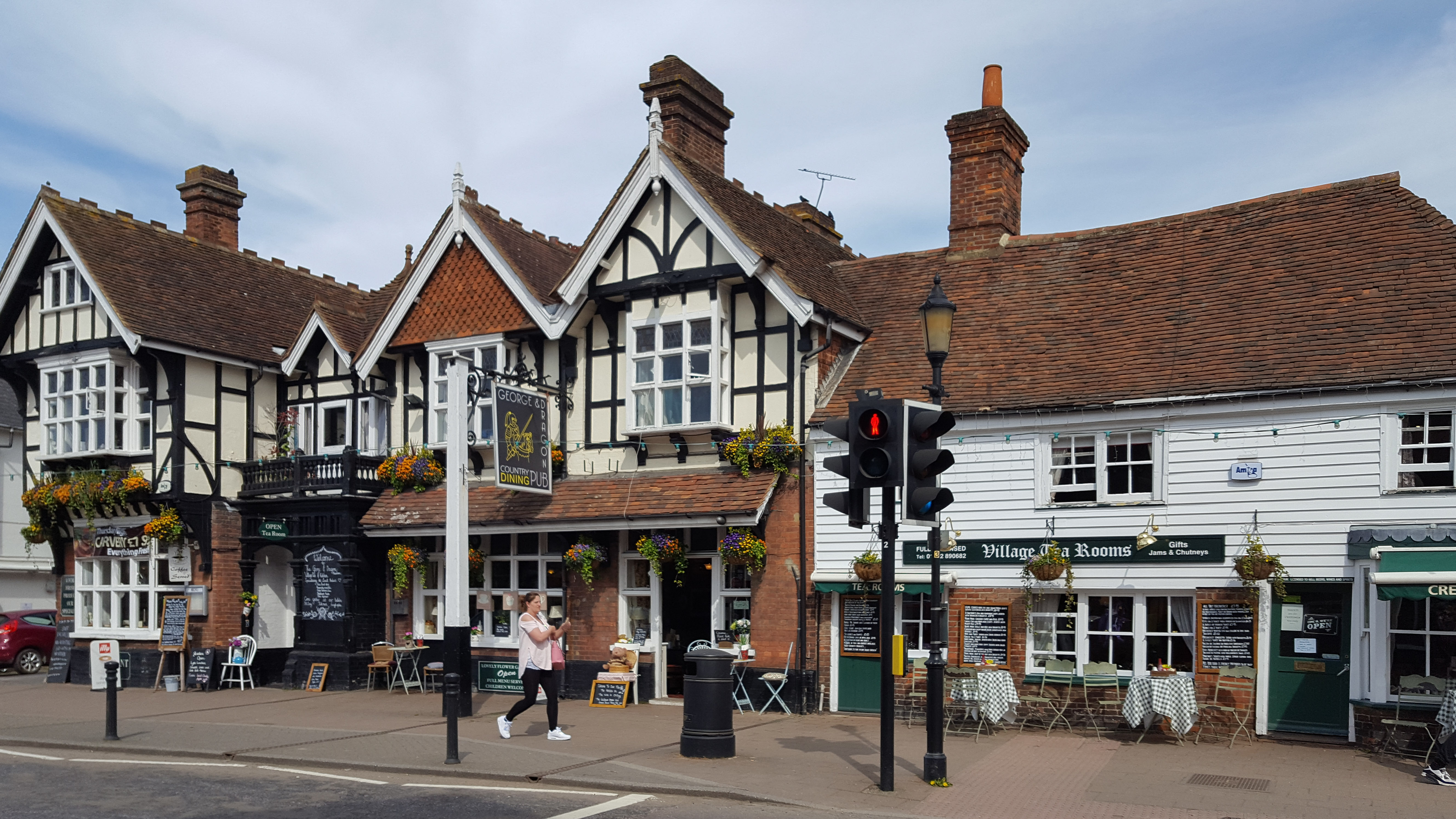
- Main Street, Headcorn

- Location within Kent
- Population: 3,241 (2001); 3,387 (2011 Census)
- OS grid reference: TQ837439
- Civil parish: Headcorn
- District: Maidstone
- Shire county: Kent
- Region: South East
- Country: England
- Sovereign state: United Kingdom
- Post town: ASHFORD
- Postcode district: TN27
- Dialling code: 01622
- Police: Kent
- Fire: Kent
- Ambulance: South East Coast
- UK Parliament: Weald of Kent

Headcorn is a village and civil parish in the borough of Maidstone in Kent, England. The parish is on the floodplain of the River Beult south east of Maidstone.

The village is 8 mi (13 km) southeast of Maidstone, on the A274 road to Tenterden. In addition to the parish church, dedicated to saints Peter and Paul, there are Baptist and Roman Catholic churches.

There is a small airfield located nearby, where there is an aviation museum and a parachuting centre. Headcorn Parachute Club is the only skydiving club in Kent and is home to national champions and world-record holders.

Headcorn railway station is on the Kent Downs line between London and Dover. It was opened on 31 August 1842. On 1 December the same year, the South Eastern Railway opened the second section of its main line onward to Ashford. By 1844, trains were running from London to Dover. In June 1865 Charles Dickens was involved in a serious railway accident to the west of the village in Staplehurst on a bridge over the River Beult.

== History ==
=== Early history ===
A Neolithic polished flint axe was found in the stream near the present school in Headcorn, and a bronze palstave axehead dating from the Bronze Age from New House Farm, found during fieldwork directed by Neil Aldridge reveal the presence of people in the area from very early times.

However, just to the north of the village a total of four much earlier Paleolithic flint handaxes have been found from a much earlier period. Three were found west of the Ulcombe Road and one from north-west of Tong. These have originated from the ancient river gravel terrace that partially survives beneath Tong Bank. This is evidence for a former ancient river system that predates the last glacial episode which ended around 15,000 years ago. The handaxes date from perhaps 250,000 BP.

There is evidence from one site in the south of the parish near New House for a probable farmstead that dates from the prehistoric Iron Age into the early Roman period. This was discovered by fieldwork undertaken by Neil Aldridge and members of the Kent Archaeological Society between 1993 and 95. Evidence for iron smelting, in the form of iron slag, and a small cemetery with three Roman cremations in pottery vessels were found. There were also a number of ditches and part of a Pre-Roman roundhouse. This was published in the journal of the Kent Archaeological Society in 2010.

At a recent housing development site at Hazelpits in Ulcombe Road archaeological work recorded further Bronze Age and Iron Age material including ditches, metal working and a burial.

An extensive series of Iron Age, Romano-British and medieval sites have also been recorded by fieldwork directed by Neil Aldridge and the Kent Archaeological Society some one and a quarter miles north of these finds in the parish of Ulcombe. These include iron-working hearths, burials, a sill beam Roman building dating to the 2nd century AD, with an earlier sunken-floored 'Grubenhaus' type structure underlying it, and an early Medieval site.

The earliest written records are references in charters of King Wihtred and King Offa to Wick Farm, 724 AD and Little Southernden, 785 AD. A probable Roman road passes close to Southernden linking Sutton Valence, Ashford, and Lympne; this was recorded by Neil Aldridge and the Kent Archaeological Society and later published in Archaeologia Cantiana in 2006. This road was probably used like many in the Weald to link the Roman iron working sites to ports and towns.

Headcorn may have originated as a "denn" or clearing, to which pigs were driven to feed on acorns in the Wealden Forest from manorial properties located in north-eastern Kent, such as Ospringe at Faversham. The network of lanes which run in a pattern North-East-South-West are the drove routes linking to the dens. This is particularly obvious when travelling from Headcorn towards say Paddock Wood when one is going 'against the grain' of the early road system. The only roads which have a different alignment are the Staplehurst-Cranbrook road which is partly Roman and the Sutton Valence-Biddenden main road which dates from 1815.

=== 11th–18th centuries ===
Although Headcorn does not appear in the Domesday Book of 1086, the Domesday Monachorum (the ecclesiastical survey made at about the same time), records the existence of a church at Hedekaruna. According to the Oxford Names Companion, the name could possibly mean 'tree-trunk (used as a footbridge) of a man called Hydeca'. An important river crossing was at Stephens Bridge on the Frittenden Road where a medieval bridge can be seen today. A second bridge, Pell Bridge, is situated south of the church which stands on a packhorse trackway to Frittenden and Cranbrook.

Henry of Ospringe, was appointed the first rector in 1222 by King Henry III. However, in 1239, the King gave the den of Headcorn, with the rectorial endowments, to the Maison Dieu at Ospringe, near Faversham. In 1251, the Master and Brethren of Ospringe were granted a weekly market on Thursdays and an annual fair at Headcorn on 29 June, St. Peter and St. Paul's Day. In 1482 the Ospringe house was dissolved and in 1516, St John's College Cambridge, was given the Maison Dieu properties. The fair was later held on 12 June, having apparently been merged with the Trinity-tide fair of Moatenden Priory.

The Trinitarian Order, or Order of the Holy Trinity for the Redemption of Captives, was founded in France in 1198. Among the first of the dozen houses it established in England, was Moatenden Priory dating from 1224. The site is off Maidstone Road Headcorn. In 1538, the priory was suppressed, among England's smaller houses, and its revenues went to the King.

The site was partially excavated by Neil Aldridge along with others of the Kent Archaeological Society, and the site of the priory church and other structures including the cloister garth were recorded beneath the garden of the present house which incorporates part of the medieval western range of the priory. This was published in Archaeologia Cantiana for 1995. The pottery from the excavation site dates from the 13th–15th centuries There were also three lead papal seals from the site, together with some carved stonework. The site is surrounded by a large moat and a number of monastic fishponds also survive. The former course of the Maidstone to Rye road passed alongside the site of the priory. During the excavations earlier material including Roman pottery and a coin was found at Moatenden, indicating settlement here over an extended period.

The prosperity brought to Headcorn by the weaving industry, established in the reign of King Edward III, is reflected in the houses built at that time and the enlargement of the Parish Church of St. Peter and St. Paul. In 1450, eighty men of Headcorn took part in Jack Cade's rebellion and subsequently received pardons.

The remains of the Headcorn Oak are near the south door of the parish church. It was extensively damaged by fire on 25 April 1989, but continued to produce new growth until July 1993. It has been claimed that the Headcorn Oak is up to 1,200 years old. However, Ian Mitchell of the Forestry Commission, an expert on old oaks, compared his own measurements taken in 1967 with those made by Robert Furley FSA, in 1878 and estimated it to be only 500 years old.

The chancel of the present parish church, is believed to mark the site of the nave of its 11th century counterpart and the Lady Chapel that of the 12th century south aisle. The 13th century saw construction of a new nave, about half the length of the present one and possibly also a cell on the site of the vicar's vestry, which dates from the early 15th century. The nave was completed in the 14th century and the present south aisle in the early 15th. Late in the same century, the tower and south porch were built.

Kent's Chantry was founded in the Lady Chapel in 1466, under licence from King Edward IV. In the south aisle, just outside the Lady Chapel and in the south wall, is an altar-tomb bearing the Culpeper arms, which also figure over the west door. The font dates from about 1450.

The Baptist community in Headcorn dates from around 1675, the first chapel having been at Bounty Farm in Love Lane. The present building in Station Road was opened in 1819 and renovated and extended in 1978, following the addition of a hall in 1971.

=== 19th century to present ===
The exact date of the first Methodist Society in Headcorn is uncertain, but it built its first chapel in 1805. It was replaced by a second in 1854. The present building, that cost £800 when built in 1867, closed for worship in 2021 and is now a community centre. Headcorn's Roman Catholic Church of St. Thomas of Canterbury was erected in Station Road in 1968. The cedar building of 1968 has been replaced by a brick one, dedicated by Bishop John Jukes on 25 June 1990.

Eight roads converge on Headcorn and there are several old bridges. Stephen's Bridge in Frittenden Road is said to have been built by Stephen Langton, Archbishop of Canterbury 1207–1228. There are records from the reigns of Edward I, Edward III and Henry IV, relating to the need to repair this bridge and Hawkenbury Bridge.

Before railways, the George Inn on Borough High Street was the hub of coach services to Kent, Surrey and Sussex. At 7:00 am on Tuesdays, Thursdays and Saturdays, the Tenterden Coach set out on a 10-hour journey of 55 ¼ miles, passing through Headcorn. By 1838, the Tally Ho Coach had shortened the journey time, leaving London at 1:00 pm and reaching Headcorn at 8:15 pm and Tenterden at 9:30 pm. For 130 years (until 1915) Messrs. R. and J. Bennett ran a horse-drawn omnibus service between Tenterden, Headcorn and Maidstone. An advertisement of 1750, illustrates R. Hammond's Tenterden, Staplehurst, Biddenden, Headcorn and Town Sutton stage wagon, with a team of eight horses. It went to London and back once a week, taking two days each way. The current train service from Headcorn to London, takes about one hour.

On 31 October 1904, the Headcorn, Sutton Valence and Maidstone Motor Omnibus Co., Ltd. opened a service using steam vehicles. This was replaced about 1912 by Reliance Motor Services. Maidstone & District Motor Services was also operating on the route by 1914 and took over Reliance two years later. Nowadays the main operator is Arriva Southern Counties.

The South Eastern Railway was opened in stages, reaching Tonbridge in May 1842, Headcorn in August and Ashford in December. From 1905 to 1954 the Kent and East Sussex Railway operated between Robertsbridge and Headcorn via Tenterden. A proposed extension to Maidstone was never built.

In 1940, following the evacuation from Dunkirk, many thousands of British and allied troops received their first meal in England at Headcorn Station. Local volunteers assisted the Royal Army Service Corps in providing refreshments. One hundred trains per day were halted, allowing only eight minutes for each.

The Aerodrome at Shenley Farm, first used by one aircraft in the 1920s, served as an advanced landing ground for Canadians and then Americans in World War II. Today, as a private civil airfield and parachute centre, it also houses the Lashenden Air Warfare Museum, the Air Cadets of 500 Squadron and Thurston Helicopters, Ltd., a helicopter flying-school company.

In the late 1970s and 1980s, Hazelpits farm was the venue for The Magic Farm, a regular queer disco run by farmer Tim Day and the Medway Area Gay Independent Community, which developed a following in the LGBTQIA+ communities of the south of England.

=== Notable buildings ===
The 1986 list of buildings of architectural or historic interest has 88 entries for Headcorn, including the parish church (Grade I), the former old vicarage (II*) a traditional 15th-century Wealden hall house renamed Headcorn Manor about 1960, the Cloth Hall (II*) and Shakespeare House (II).

There are a number of significant medieval buildings in the area of Church Walk and the High Street. The line of Church walk is actually the earlier main road before construction of the present A274 in 1815. In Church Walk are three Wealden Hall Houses with the most important being Headcorn Manor. In the High Street, recent research by Peter Leach and Neil Aldridge has identified 21–25 High Street as being a large medieval structure. The scantlings in the front upper floor of 25 extend through into 23 High Street and indicate the size and importance of this timber-framed building.

Foreman's original store with its overhang, preserved as part of the Foreman's Centre, marks the site of the old National School, which was in existence by 1846 and replaced in 1870 by the building in Parsonage Meadow, since known as the Church School and now Longmeadow Hall. This was used only briefly as a National School, because a Board School (now part of the Headcorn Primary School) was opened in King's Road in 1873. Longmeadow Hall is currently being restored as part of the Community Centre project.
