= Ashford West railway station =

Disused railway station in Ashford, Kent

Ashford West

General information
- Location: Ashford, Kent; England
- Coordinates: 51.1476°N 0.8663°E
- Grid reference: TR 005 426
- Platforms: 3

Other information
- Status: Disused

History
- Original company: London, Chatham and Dover Railway
- Pre-grouping: South Eastern and Chatham Railway
- Post-grouping: Southern Railway

Key dates
- 1 July 1884: Station opened
- 1 January 1899: Closed to passengers
- 1990s: closed for all traffic
Location

Ashford West railway station is a former railway station in Ashford, Kent. It was the terminus of the Maidstone Line from 1884 to 1898, constructed by the London, Chatham and Dover Railway. On the formation of the South Eastern and Chatham Railway, passenger services were transferred to the former South Eastern Railway's Ashford station. The station buildings and infrastructure survived and was used for various purposes until the late 20th century.

== History ==
=== Opening ===
The station opened on 1 July 1884 as the new terminus of the Maidstone Line by the London, Chatham and Dover Railway (LCDR), who had extended it from Maidstone East. A connection between the LCDR and the rival SER South Eastern Railway's South Eastern Main Line opened to traffic on 1 November 1891. The station was located off Gasworks Lane, near Ashford's cattle market, and was used for cattle and sheep traffic after it had closed to passengers.

Facilities comprised three platforms. There was a carriage shed and an engine shed, with a turntable, which was removed and installed at Deal in 1904. Two signal boxes controlled the station.

=== Closure ===
From 1 January 1899, passenger services were transferred to the former SER station. The engine shed closed on this date. was later converted into a works for cleaning cloths used in locomotive cleaning. Over a million were processed annually, with the reclaimed oil being re-used in the lubrication of points and point rodding. The platform canopies were intact in the mid-1930s, but had been removed by July 1957.

The station site was largely intact as late as 1985. The main station building was used for railway offices and residential accommodation, and was still standing as of 1994. Much of the track around the station was used by the engineers department until the 1990s. The remaining buildings and track were removed in 1999 for the construction of HS1.

Preceding station	Disused railways	Following station
Terminus	London, Chatham and Dover Railway; Maidstone Line	Hothfield
