= Ashford International railway station =

Railway station in Kent, England

Ashford International
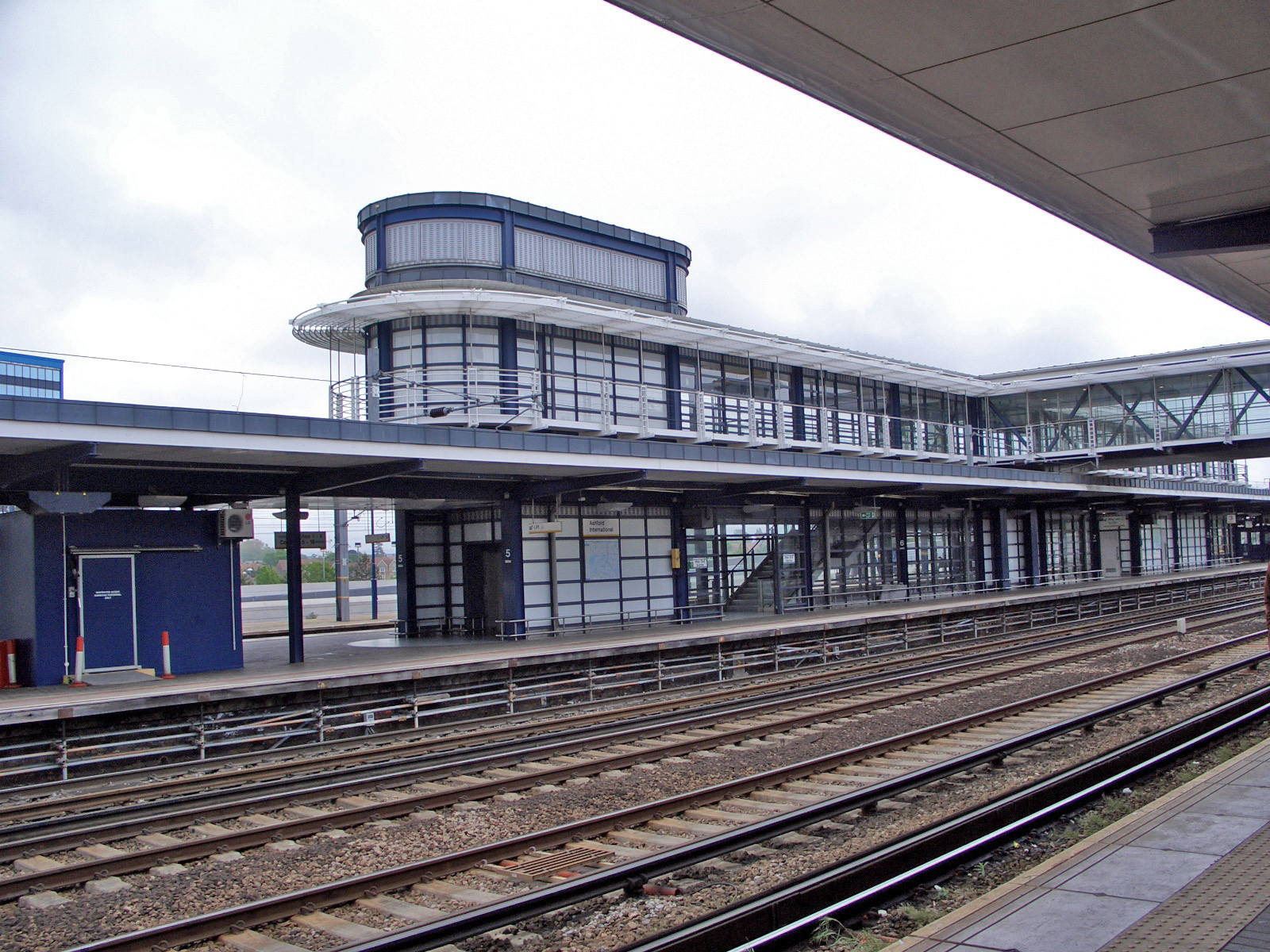

General information
- Location: Ashford, Borough of Ashford, England
- Coordinates: 51.1435°N 0.8750°E
- Grid reference: TR011421
- Manager: Southeastern; HS1 Ltd
- Platforms: 6 (2 out of use)

Other information
- Station code: AFK (ASI for Eurostar services)
- Classification: DfT category B

Key dates
- 1 December 1842: Opened as Ashford
- 9 July 1923: Renamed Ashford (Kent)
- 8 January 1996: Commencement of Eurostar services
- 28 February 1996: Rebuilt and renamed Ashford International
- 13 December 2009: Commencement of High Speed 1 domestic services
- September 2020: Eurostar services suspended

Passengers
- 2020/21: ▼1.064 million
- Interchange: ▼0.197 million
- 2021/22: ▲2.657 million
- Interchange: ▲0.522 million
- 2022/23: ▲3.247 million
- Interchange: ▲0.837 million
- 2023/24: ▲3.511 million
- Interchange: ▲0.862 million
- 2024/25: ▲3.792 million
- Interchange: ▼0.852 million
Location
Notes
- Passenger statistics from the Office of Rail and Road

Ashford International railway station serves the town of Ashford, in Kent, England. It connects several railway lines, including High Speed 1 and the South Eastern Main Line. Services are operated by Southeastern and Southern.

The station opened in 1842 as Ashford by the South Eastern Railway (SER), as a temporary terminus of the line from London to Dover Priory via Croydon. Connections to Folkestone, Canterbury and Hastings opened within ten years. It was renamed Ashford (Kent) in 1923. There have been two significant rebuilds: in the 1960s for the South Eastern Main Line electrification, and to accommodate international services in the 1990s. The station was renamed Ashford International in 1996. International services were reduced following the completion of the Channel Tunnel Rail Link and the opening of Ebbsfleet International in 2007, but were partially restored before being suspended indefinitely in 2020. Domestic services along High Speed 1 to St Pancras have been running since 2009.

== History ==
=== South Eastern Railway ===
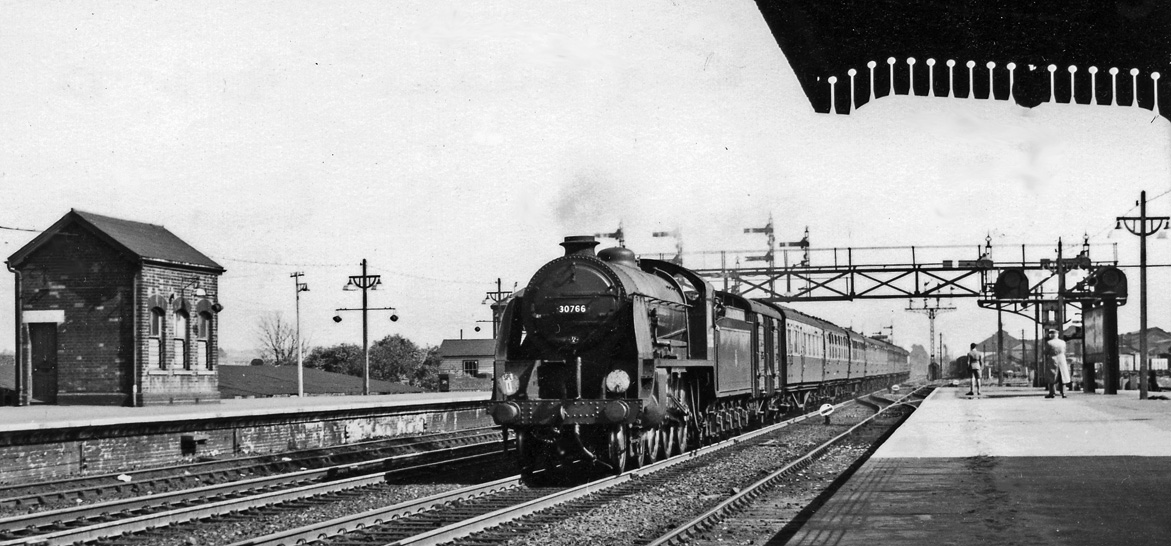
Ashford station in 1957

The station was built by the South Eastern Railway (SER) and planned during the initial Railway Mania as a stop between Croydon and Dover. A special train from London Bridge ran on 28 November 1842 and the station formally opened on 1 December, along with the rest of the line from Redhill. The journey from London to Ashford could now be made in three and a half hours. A more direct route was ruled out by Parliament, which felt that more than one railway south of London was undesirable.

The original station consisted of two platforms with two through lines, along with wooden buildings. The line ended at Ashford until the extension to Folkestone Central opened on 28 June 1843. A connection to Canterbury West was authorised on 23 May 1844 and was opened on 6 February 1846. The Marshlink line connection to Hastings opened on 13 February 1851, after several false starts owing to problems with constructing the line and rivalry with other lines. The station sometimes known as Ashford Junction.

The Ashford railway works was established in 1847, on a site to the east of the station and the river Stour. The first locomotive, known as the "Coffee Pot" for its unusual vertical boiler, was designed there the following year and constructed in 1850. It remained in service until 1861. The works led to the creation of Alfred Town, later known at New Town which is now an Ashford suburb.

Another station, Ashford West, was opened by the rival London, Chatham & Dover Railway (LCDR) on 1 July 1884 for services to London, via Maidstone East. It was based to the south-west of the town centre, adjacent to the cattle market. A link from the LCDR line to the SER station opened on 1 November 1891.

=== South Eastern and Chatham Railway ===
On 1 January 1899, as part of the formation of the South Eastern and Chatham Railway (SECR), passenger services were diverted to the former SER station and Ashford West closed. At the same time, the track was modified to give six separate approaches into the station, so that trains could pull up simultaneously. The complete Ashford West station, including buildings and platforms, were converted into a works for cleaning cloths used in locomotive cleaning; over a million were processed annually, with the reclaimed oil being reused in the lubrication of points and point rodding. The platform canopies survived to the 1930s, while the station site was largely intact as of 1985, with the main station building still standing in 1994.

The station buildings were demolished in 1999 for the construction of High Speed 1.

In November 1904, the SECR agreed to a £47,000 rebuilding of the scheme in order to accommodate Maidstone traffic, which included removing a cattle dock so trains would not have to run on part of the South Eastern Main Line. The work was completed in 1907. Further resignalling work continued into the next year.

=== Southern Railway ===
The station became part of the Southern Railway (SR) during the Grouping of 1923. It was renamed Ashford (Kent) on 9 July to avoid confusion with Ashford (Middlesex). Ashford became the main works depot in the South East, after the SR reduced the works at Brighton to repairs-only in 1928. Steam locomotive construction was discontinued in 1936, though repair work continued to take place.

=== British Rail ===
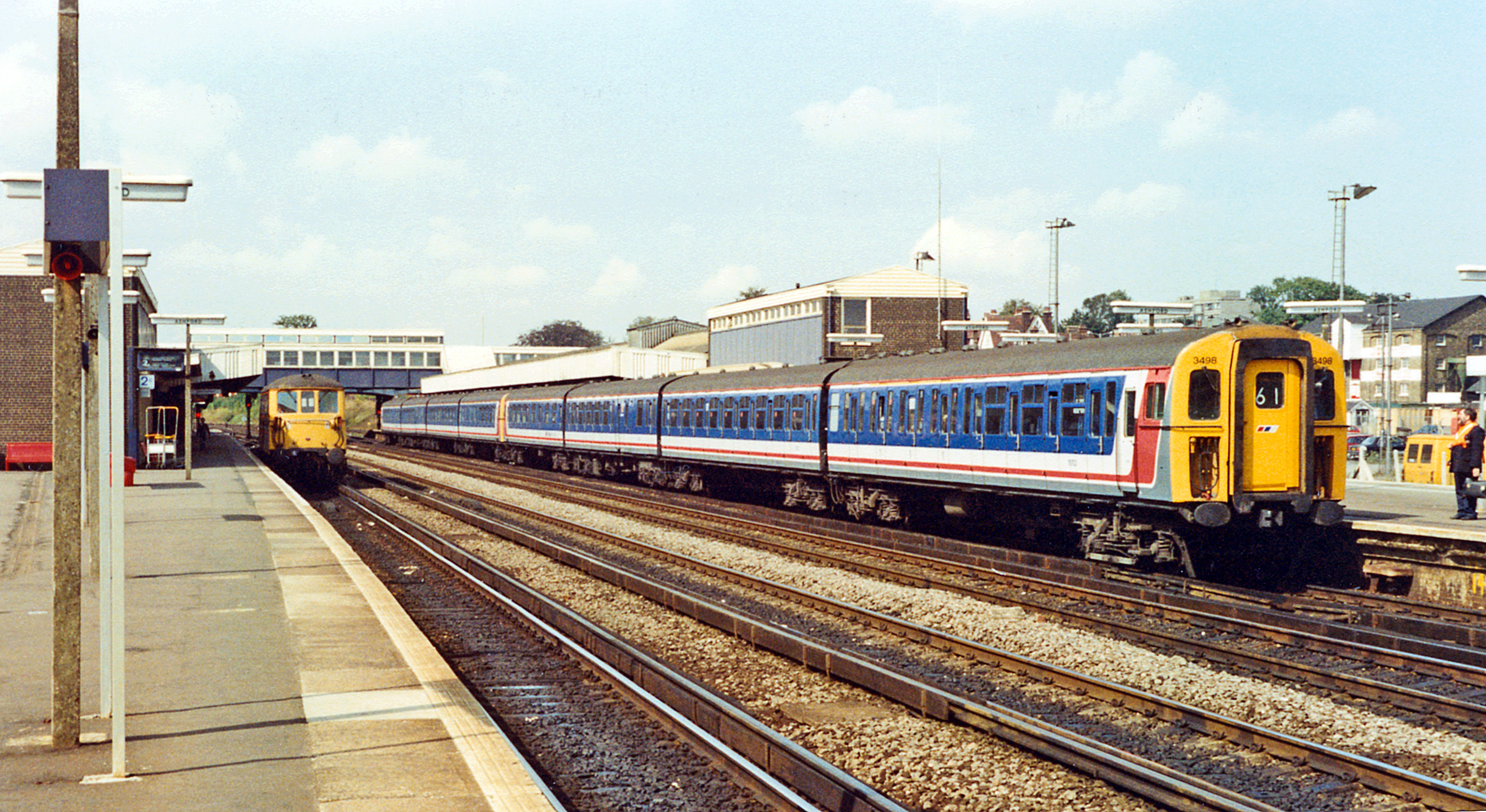
The station in 1990, before being rebuilt later that decade

The station passed on to the Southern Region of British Railways on nationalisation in 1948. It was rebuilt in the early 1960s as part of the Kent Coast Electrification – Stage 2 stage of the British Railways Modernisation Plan to accommodate electrification of most lines entering the station. Electric services began on the South Eastern Main Line on 12 June 1961 and on the Maidstone line on 9 October. The two bay platforms were demolished and replaced by two island platforms. This required the demolition and rebuilding of the Station Road / Beaver Road bridge immediately to the west. Ashford's four signal boxes were replaced by a single control centre on 29 April 1962.

The main station buildings on either side of the line were replaced between 1963 and 1966 by a footbridge including a booking hall, newsagent and catering facilities. The new scheme was the design of the Southern Region's architect, Nigel Wikeley. Although most of the original station was demolished during this rebuild, two substantial platform canopies dating from the SECR era were retained, although the original wooden valences were covered by asbestos. At the same time, the mechanical signalling system, consisting of five lever-operated boxes, was replaced with an all-electric system; it came into service on 29 April 1962.

When sectorisation was introduced in the 1980s by British Rail, the station was served by Network SouthEast until privatisation. In 1984, the track layout at the station was simplified, restricting the Maidstone and Canterbury West connections to the north of the track layout, and the Marshlink line to the south. This allowed the speed limit through the station to be increased to 85 miles per hour (137 km/h).

=== International station ===
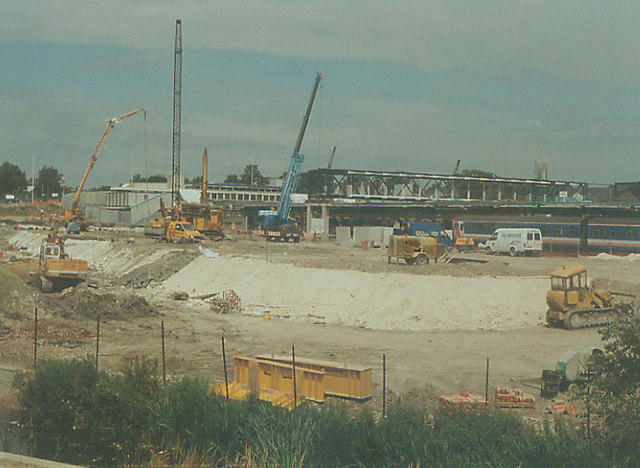
Rebuilding the international station, 1994

The station was rebuilt as Ashford International to serve trains to mainland Europe. Construction was planned to begin in 1991, but was delayed owing to a lack of government approval. It was planned as a partial park and ride side, catering for up to 2,000 vehicles, and as a means of regenerating the town. Work started on the rebuilding in June 1994 and continued for 18 months.

The project was designed by the British Rail Architecture and Design Group, and was inspired by the Maison de Verre in Paris. Two new platforms were built to the north of the station, with the original down island platform taken over by international services. The total cost of the work was £80 million. The platforms reallocated for international services needed to be lengthened to 412 metres (1,352 ft) in order to accommodate the 392-metre (1,286 ft) Class 373 trains used by Eurostar.

To segregate passengers from domestic and international services, a dedicated entrance from the ticket barrier to the platforms was built. This included a separate departure lounge that could accommodate up to 800 passengers. A multi-storey car park was built, connecting to the international end of the station via a footbridge.

The rebuilt station opened for international services on 8 January 1996, with the first stop being the 06:19 service from Waterloo. The station was formally renamed Ashford International on 28 February. When phase 1 of the Channel Tunnel Rail Link was completed in 2003, a dedicated fast line was built allowing through trains to bypass the station via a 0.9 miles (1.5 km) tunnel and a 0.9 miles (1.4 km) viaduct.

Before the completion of High Speed 1 in November 2007, twelve Eurostar trains a day called at Ashford: seven heading to Paris and five to Brussels. However, after the opening of Ebbsfleet International, this was reduced to three trains to/from Paris, and a daily service to Disneyland Paris.

Eurostar defended the reduction, saying stopping at Ashford International added eight minutes to journey times and required 25 people joining the train there to make it economically viable. A petition to reinstate services gathered 11,000 signatures. A single direct train in each direction to Brussels was reinstated in 2009, following campaigning from Kent County Council and Ashford Borough Council. This was expanded the following year to allow direct services between Ashford, Lille and Brussels-South on weekends, making day trips to European cities from Ashford possible. In May 2015, a service to Marseille, via Lyon and Avignon, began running up to five times a week.

In 2018, it was announced that the international platforms would undergo a £10 million refurbishment to make them compatible with Eurostar's Class 374 units, branded as Eurostar e320, as well as to allow other operators to use the station. The first Eurostar e320 stopped at Ashford on 3 April, with the Secretary of State for Transport, Chris Grayling, and the MP for Ashford, Damian Green, on board. No other e320s stopped at Ashford International because of a technical fault until January 2020.

==== Closure ====
In September 2020, Eurostar announced that due to the ongoing COVID-19 pandemic and subsequent collapse in ticket revenue, (Note: Revenue had reduced by 90% compared to the previous year.) both Ebbsfleet and Ashford International stations would not be served by Eurostar services until at least 2022. In September 2021, Eurostar confirmed that services would not resume until 2023, despite complaints by local politicians that this was "bad for Kent". Eurostar stated that they will resume services when commercially sensible to do so, as they will initially "focus on destinations where demand is highest".

A further update in August 2022 confirmed that the station, along with Ebbsfleet International, would likely not open until at least 2025. Additional processing work caused by Brexit has also contributed to suspension of services. At the start of 2024, Eurostar reiterated that services would not run from Ashford for the entire year, with the following year to be reviewed at a later date.

In 2022, the MPs for Ashford and Dartford, Damian Green and Gareth Johnson, met with Eurostar's chief executive to persuade it to restart services, but described the meeting as "frustrating". The Transport minister, Huw Merriman, was a regular Eurostar passenger and supported their positions. Local residents have complained that the stopping of international services has harmed Ashford and caused decline in the local area.

In 2023, the Bring Back Eurostar Group was formed, campaigning to reintroduce the services. A related petition attracted 23,000 signatures by June, and 36,000 by October. Local councillor, Derek Murphy, said they were attempting to lobby the British Embassies in Paris and Brussels for a change.

Virgin Trains have announced plans to compete with Eurostar, which obtained Government approval in 2025. A representative said that their services would stop at Ashford if the station was open.

=== Domestic services ===
In 2007, a new maintenance depot, sited to the north-east of the station and operated by Hitachi Rail, was opened alongside the Canterbury West branch. A high-speed domestic service, operated by Southeastern to London St Pancras, via Ebbsfleet International and Stratford International, began with a trial service in June 2009. A test train running at up to 140 miles per hour (230 km/h) covered the distance between Ashford International and St Pancras in 29 minutes. A full service began in December 2009, which has allowed Ashford to become a commuter town for London.

In 2018, Thameslink announced services from London Bridge to Ashford International via Swanley, Otford and Maidstone East. These plans were put on hold and then abandoned, following the steep decline in rail traffic as a result of COVID lockdown.

=== Southern ===
The Marshlink line from Ashford International to Ore is one of only two passenger lines in the south east that has not yet been electrified, and is mostly single track beyond Appledore, which limits capacity. In May 2018, Southern announced the direct service from Ashford International to Brighton would be discontinued and cut back to Eastbourne. The company wanted to cancel the service for some time, as it would allow them to add additional capacity between Eastbourne and Hastings, but had repeatedly faced objections from councillors along the line, including at Lewes.

=== Incidents ===
The first fatality on the South Eastern Railway occurred at Ashford in May 1843. A guard had stepped onto a running board to look for lost luggage, when the train suddenly started; he was decapitated when his head hit a sentry box.

== Layout ==
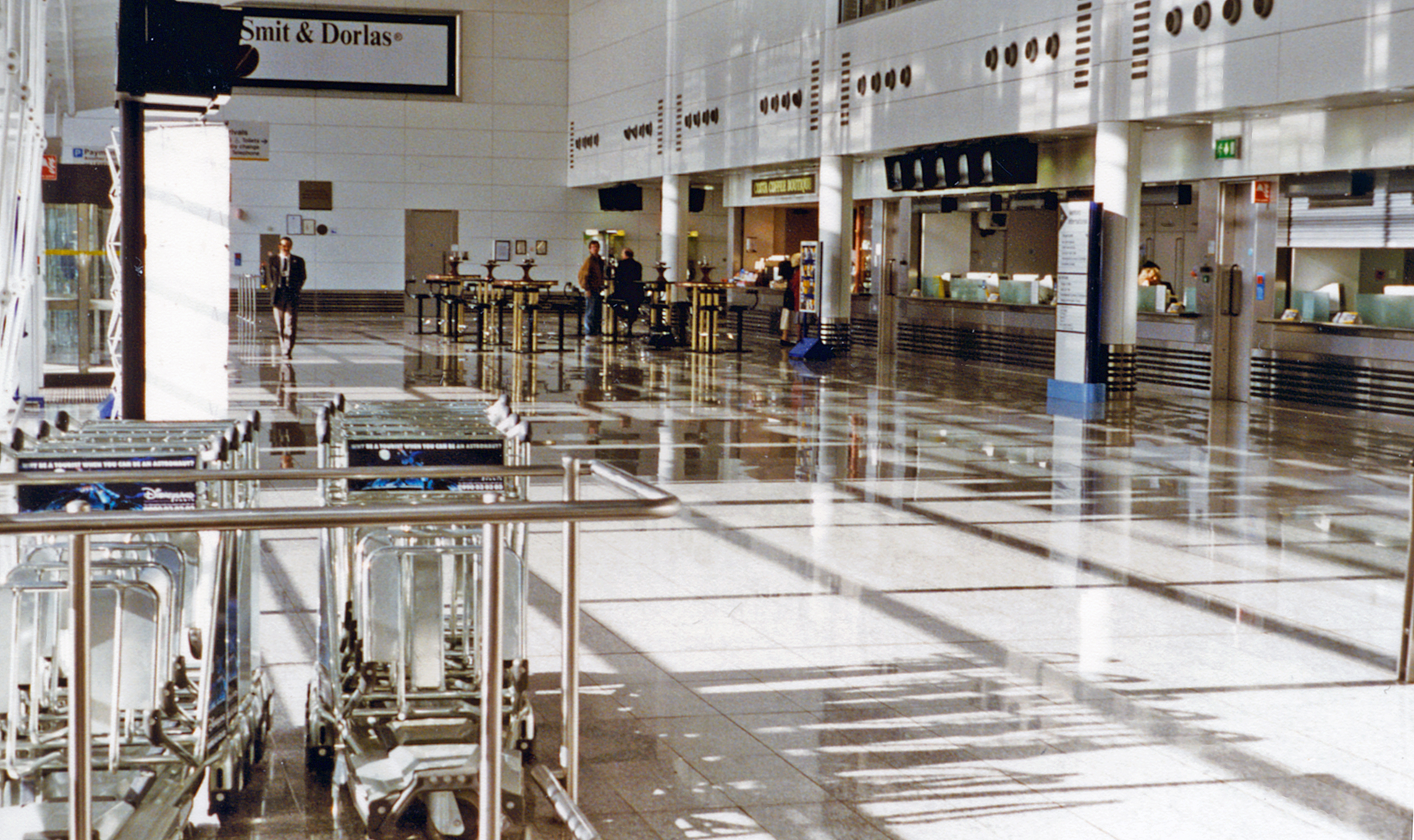
The international terminal concourse

The station is located to the south-east of the town centre, at the convergence of several important lines; these are:

- High Speed 1 from London St Pancras International to the Channel Tunnel
- South Eastern Main Line from London Charing Cross to Dover Priory
- Maidstone line from London Victoria, via Maidstone East
- Ashford to Ramsgate line, via Canterbury West
- Marshlink line to Hastings.

It is 56 miles 12 chains (90.4 km) down the line from Charing Cross, via Chelsfield, and 59 miles 19 chains (95.3 km) from Victoria, via Herne Hill.

While all lines are electrified to 750 V DC third rail, platforms 3 to 6 are also electrified with 25 kV 50 Hz AC overhead lines.

The station has six platforms. Eurostar trains have previously used platforms 3 and 4, while domestic trains use the original platforms 1 and 2, and a new island platform (numbered 5 and 6) built by British Rail when the Channel Tunnel opened. The Eurostar platforms have bilingual signs. The domestic terminal to the north of the tracks and the international terminal to the south are connected by a subway which has access to the platforms; access to the international trains on platforms 3 and 4 is only possible through an overbridge from the international terminal.

== Facilities ==
There are ticket office windows in the domestic booking hall, along with vending machines. There is a domestic ticket office window in the Eurostar station, staffed during morning peak only. The international ticket counter in the Eurostar station was only staffed for part of the day. The international terminal is connected to a multi-storey car park by a footbridge, while other parking facilities are adjacent to the domestic entrance.

The local bus stops and taxi ranks are at the entrance to the domestic terminal.

== Services ==
=== Domestic ===
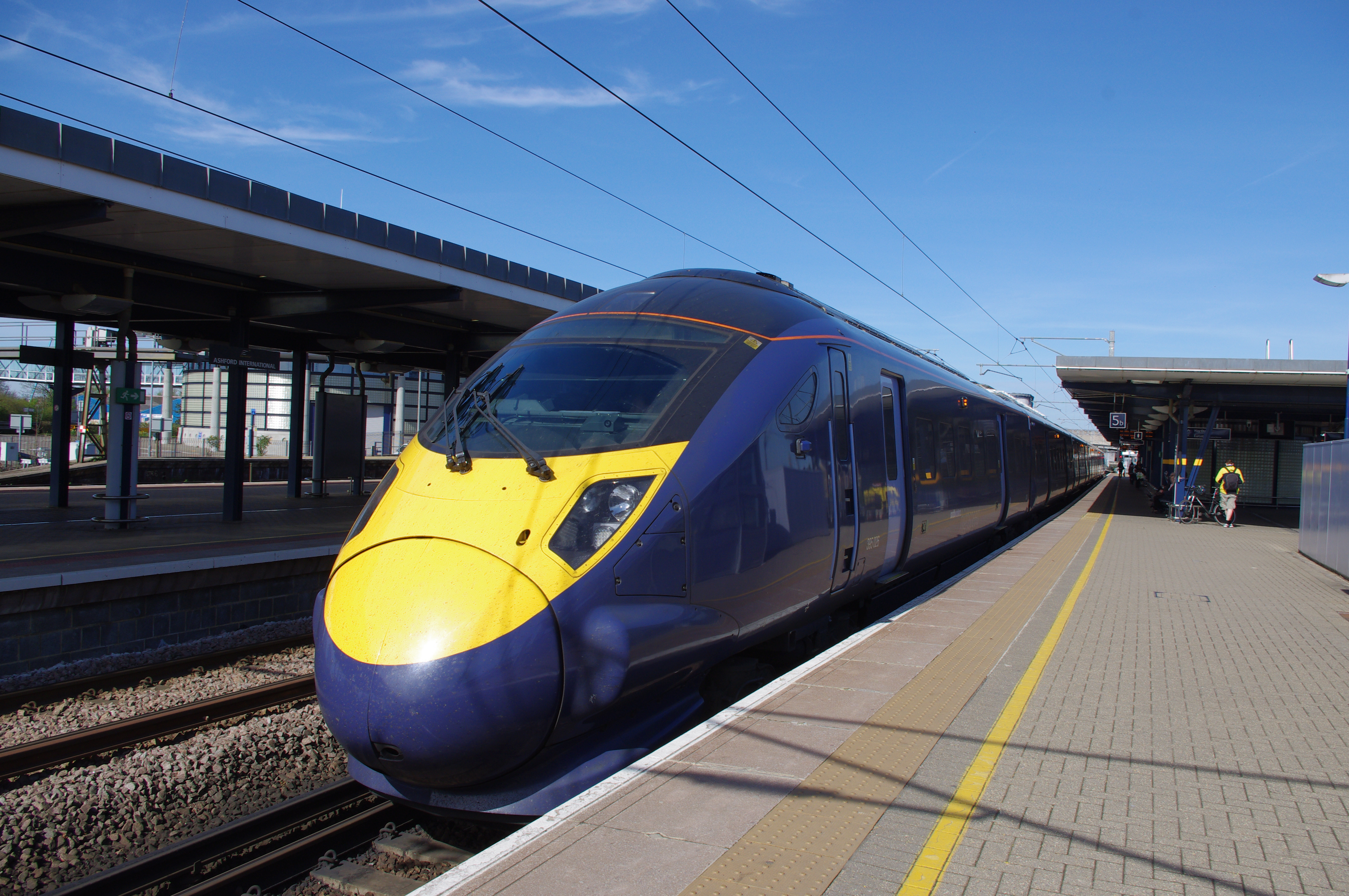
A Southeastern Class 395 high speed train calling at the station

Domestic services at Ashford International are operated by two train operating companies:

Southeastern:

The typical off-peak service in trains per hour (tph) is:

- 2 tph to London St Pancras International
- 2 tph to London Charing Cross, via Tonbridge
- 1 tph to London Victoria, via Maidstone East
- 1 tph to Dover Priory
- 1 tph to Ramsgate, via Dover Priory and Deal
- 1 tph to Ramsgate, via Canterbury West
- 1 tph to Margate, via Canterbury West.

Additional services, including trains to and from London Cannon Street call at the station during peak hours.

Services are operated using Classes 375, 377 and 395 electric multiple units.

Southern:

- 1 tph to Eastbourne, via Hastings.

Services are operated with Class 171 diesel multiple units.

=== International ===
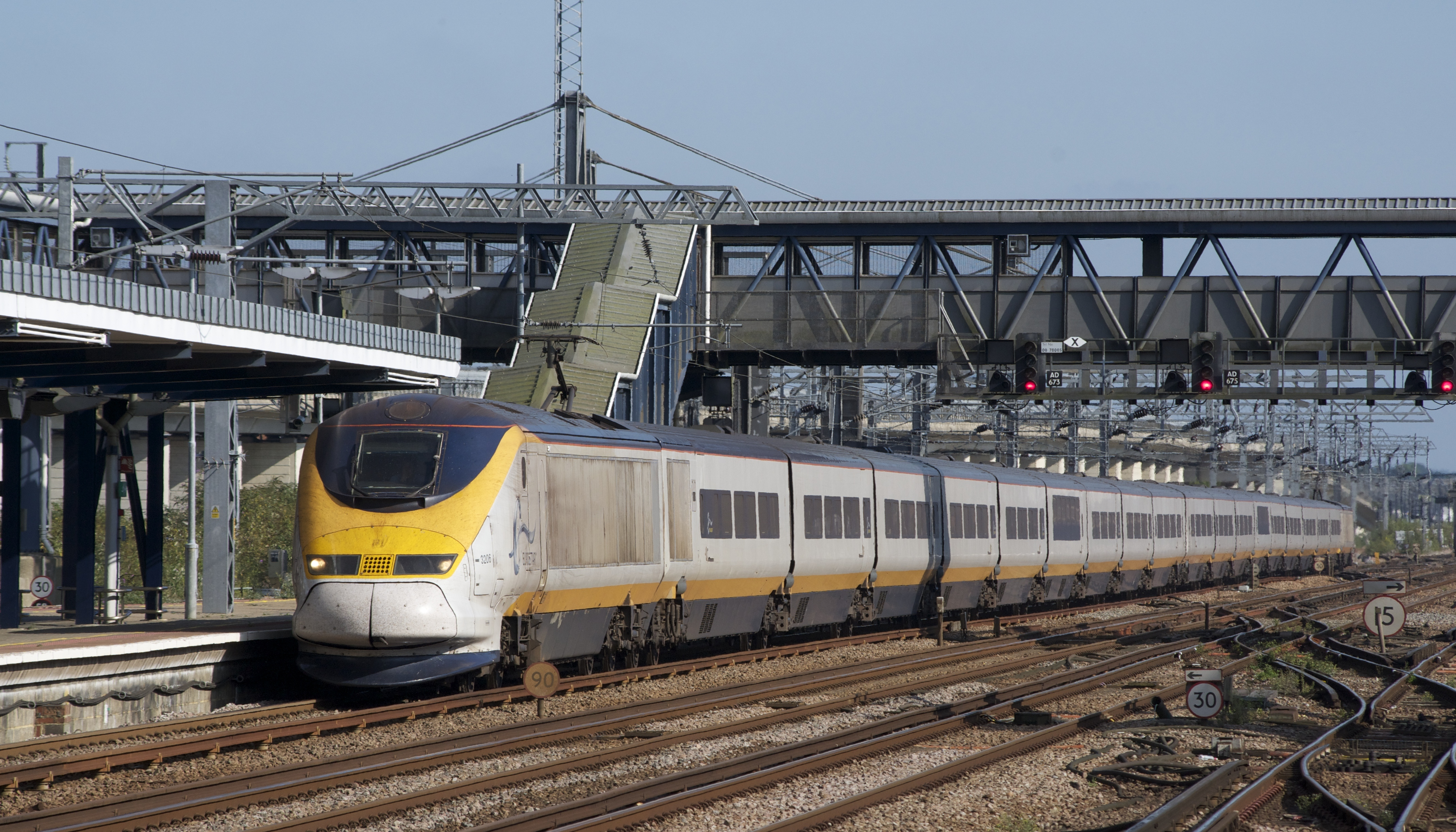
A Eurostar train at the station

Eurostar services are not currently stopping at Ashford International. In July 2020, the off-peak timetable in trains per day/week (tpd/tpw) was:

- 3 tpd to Paris – Gare du Nord
- 1 tpd to Brussels South
- 1 tpd to Marne-la-Vallée – Chessy (Disneyland Paris)
- 3 tpw to Marseille – Saint-Charles via Lyon and Avignon – seasonal service from May to September
- 3 tpw to Bourg-Saint-Maurice in the French Alps – seasonal service from December to April.

Direct Eurostar services from St Pancras to Amsterdam Centraal did not stop at Ashford, though a connection could be made by changing at Brussels.

Preceding station	National Rail	Following station
Ebbsfleet International	Southeastern High Speed 1	Canterbury West
Ebbsfleet International	Southeastern High Speed 1	Folkestone West
Pluckley or Headcorn	Southeastern South Eastern Main Line	Westenhanger
Pluckley or Headcorn	Southeastern Ashford to Ramsgate line	Wye
Charing	Southeastern Kent Downs line	Terminus
Ham Street	Southern Marshlink line	Terminus
	Eurostar	
London St Pancras International or Ebbsfleet International	Eurostar (Suspended)	Calais-Frethun or Lille Europe
London St Pancras International or Ebbsfleet International	Eurostar (Suspended)	Paris Nord
	Disused railways	
Waterloo International	Eurostar	Calais-Fréthun
Pluckley	British Rail Southern Region South Eastern Main Line	Smeeth
Hothfield	British Rail Southern Region Maidstone line	Terminus

== Future ==
With the connection between High Speed 1 and the Marshlink line, it creates potential for a fast service from St Pancras to Hastings and Eastbourne. In November 2017, the Secretary of State for Transport, Chris Grayling, proposed a modification of the track layout at Ashford International to accommodate such a service. The scheme was supported by Amber Rudd, the former MP for Hastings and Rye.

To connect the two lines, the junction at the west end of the station would need to be rebuilt, with 25 kV AC overhead wires being installed along platform 2. This would relieve pressure from platforms 5 and 6, which currently handle all High Speed 1 domestic services.

== See also ==
- Ashford Steam Centre
- Ashford train depot
