= Sandling railway station =

Railway station in Kent, England

Sandling
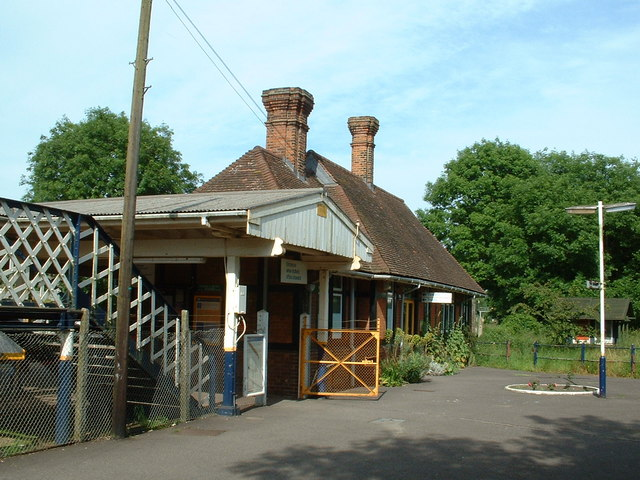

General information
- Location: Sandling, Folkestone & Hythe; England
- Coordinates: 51.0904°N 1.0662°E
- Grid reference: TR148368
- Manager: Southeastern
- Platforms: 2

Other information
- Station code: SDG
- Classification: DfT category E

History
- Opened: 1 January 1888
- Original company: South Eastern Railway
- Pre-grouping: South Eastern Railway
- Post-grouping: Southern Railway

Key dates
- 1 January 1888: Opened as Sandling Junction
- 3 December 1951: Renamed as Sandling for Hythe
- 12 May 1980: Renamed as Sandling

Passengers
- 2020/21: ▼20,000
- 2021/22: ▲53,828
- 2022/23: ▲70,978
- 2023/24: ▲73,646
- 2024/25: ▲75,282
Location
Notes
- Passenger statistics from the Office of Rail and Road

Sandling railway station is on the South Eastern Main Line in England, serving the village of Sandling and the market town of Hythe, Kent. It is 65 miles 36 chains (105.3 km) down the line from London Charing Cross. The station and all trains that call are operated by Southeastern.

== History ==
The station was opened as Sandling Junction on 1 January 1888 by the South Eastern Railway (SER). The station was situated at the junction of the SER mainline (between Ashford and Folkestone and the Sandgate branch line that had opened in 1874 between Westenhanger and Sandgate., which was geographically located in Seabrook.)

There were four platforms with a footbridge over the mainline, two signal boxes and goods sidings either side of the branch line. The goods yard was able to accommodate most types of goods, including livestock.

The up branch platform was closed when the line to Sandgate was cut back to Hythe and the branch line singled in 1931.

The station was host to a Southern Railway camping coach in 1939.

The branch line to Hythe was closed on 3 December 1951 and the down branch platform was closed. At the same time the station was renamed Sandling for Hythe.

A camping coach was also positioned here by the Southern Region from 1954 to 1959, the coach was replaced in 1960 by two Pullman camping coaches until 1964 then from 1965 to 1967 there were three of them. The coaches were fitted with a full kitchen, two sleeping compartments and a room with two single beds.

On 12 May 1980 the station was renamed as Sandling.

It is the closest station to Saltwood Castle (where Alan Clark lived until his death) and it is frequently mentioned in the Alan Clark Diaries.

In 2022 the disused branch platform is still in situ and a short section of the Hythe branch is available as a footpath.

== Facilities ==
The station has a ticket office which is staffed during weekday mornings only (06:20-13:00 Mon-Fri). At other times, the station is unstaffed and tickets must be purchased from the self-service ticket machine. The station has passenger help points located on each of the two platforms.

The station has a small cycle rack as well as a chargeable car park at the entrance, operated by Saba Parking.

The station has step-free access available to the platforms although the Dover-bound platform can only be reached from the station building via the footbridge, meaning step-free access is not possible if ticket facilities are required, as there is no ticket machine on the Dover platform.

== Services ==
All services at Sandling are operated by Southeastern using Class 375 EMUs.

The typical off-peak service in trains per hour is:

- 1 tph to London Charing Cross via Tonbridge
- 1 tph to Dover Priory

Additional services, including trains to and from London Cannon Street and Ramsgate via Deal, and to London Victoria call at the station during the peak hours.

Preceding station	National Rail	Following station
Westenhanger	Southeastern South Eastern Main Line	Folkestone West
	Disused railways	
Westenhanger	British Rail Southern Region Sandgate Branch	Hythe

== Connections ==
Stagecoach South East routes 10 and 18 serve the station.
