= Southern Region of British Railways =

Former region of British Railways from 1948

Southern Region
- Region logo from 1965 to 1992
- Predecessor: Southern Railway
- Founded: 1 January 1948
- Defunct: 31 March 1994
- Headquarters: London Waterloo station, England
- Area served: Southern England
- Parent: British Rail
- Divisions: Central; South Eastern; South Western

The Southern Region was a constituent part of British Railways, the national, state-owned railway company of Great Britain. It was created on 1 January 1948, taking over the network of the former Southern Railway and some privately owned lines. It ran train services, managed stations, and maintained infrastructure and rolling stock until April 1992, when its responsibilities were transferred to Network SouthEast. The Southern Region was formally abolished on 31 March 1994 in preparation for the privatisation of British Rail.

== Geographical scope ==
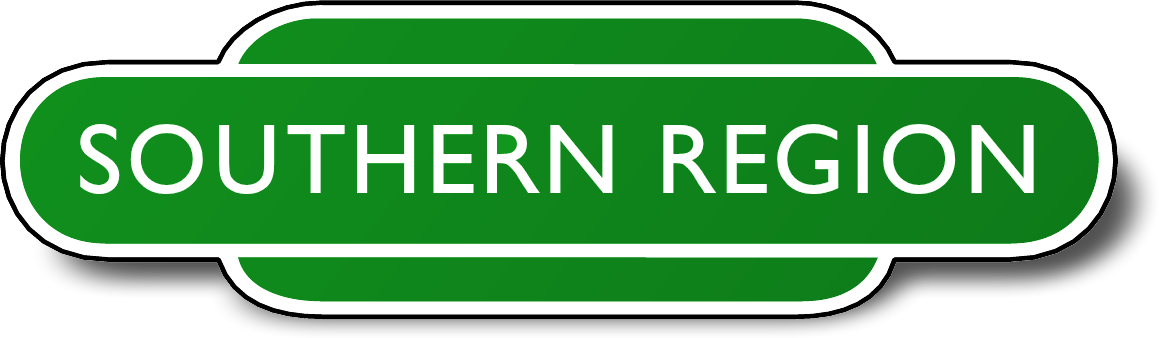
Station totem design before 1965

The Southern Region was formed on 1 January 1948, from the network of the Southern Railway (SR), which it replaced. The headquarters were at Waterloo station, and the region included six other London termini (Victoria, Charing Cross, Holborn Viaduct, Blackfriars, Cannon Street and London Bridge). By 1949, it covered around 2,550 route miles (4,100 km) and was the second smallest region by route mileage after the North Eastern.

Some previously independent lines, which had not been part of the SR, were also incorporated into the region, including the Kent and East Sussex Railway and the East Kent Light Railway. The Somerset and Dorset Joint Railway (S&DJR), which had been jointly owned by the SR and the London, Midland and Scottish Railway before nationalisation, was wholly incorporated into the Southern Region. In contrast, the narrow-gauge Romney, Hythe and Dymchurch Railway remained independent. For the first two years of its existence, the region owned and operated Southampton Docks, but responsibility for the port was transferred to the Docks and Inland Waterways Executive in September 1950.

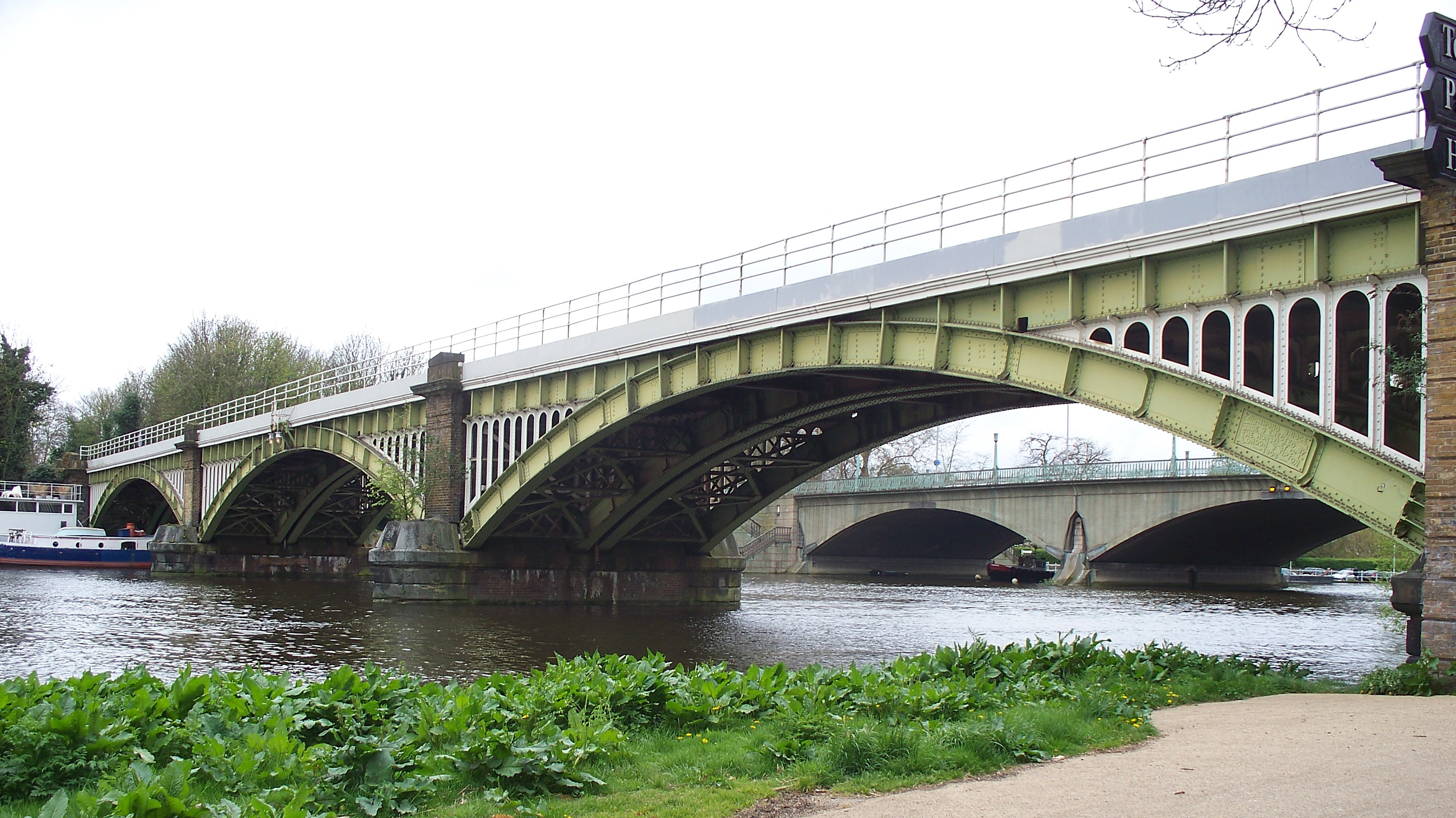
Richmond Railway Bridge spanning the Thames in Richmond upon Thames.

The boundaries of the region were adjusted several times during the 1950s and early 1960s, resulting in the exchange of several lines with the Western Region (WR). The first alterations took place on 2 April 1950, when all former SR lines west of Exeter along with the northern part of the Somerset and Dorset Railway (S&DR) were transferred to the WR. In exchange, the Southern Region gained Salisbury–Westbury, Reading West–Basingstoke, Newbury–Winchester (Chesil), Grafton and Burbage–Andover (including the Tidworth branch line), Sparkford–Weymouth (including the Bridport Railway, the Abbotsbury Railway and the Portland Branch Railway), as well as the Weymouth–Channel Islands ferry services.

The second boundary alteration to affect the operation of the S&DR took place on 1 February 1958, when the line north of Templecombe was transferred to the WR. A third change occurred on 1 January 1963, when the boundary was moved further southwards to between Shillingstone and Blandford Forum. On the same day, the West of England line west of Salisbury was transferred from the Southern Region to the WR.

== Organisational history ==
=== End of the Southern Railway (1939–1948) ===
The Emergency (Railway Control) Order 1939, issued by the UK government on 1 September 1939, brought the railways under the control of the Railway Executive Committee (REC), which reported to the Minister of Transport. Throughout the Second World War, the Southern Railway (SR) was paid a fixed rental by HM Treasury, instead of receiving income from fares and freight charges. The movement of military personnel, supplies and equipment was prioritised, and on 11 September 1940 an emergency timetable came into force, with lower maximum train speeds and a significantly reduced evening service to allow more freight traffic to operate. Infrastructure works were directed to bomb damage repair, causing a backlog of routine maintenance, and the construction of new locomotives and rolling stock was restricted.

Following the end of the war, the SR worked to repair its network. However, the rental that had been paid by the government was insufficient to fund the works required. The trusts that had been set up by the government to pay for post-war reconstruction of the railways, were devalued through high inflation, and controls over building supplies delayed repairs further. Nevertheless, the SR was the most successful of the Big Four railway companies in restoring its services, and by October 1946 over 81% of its pre-war timetable had been reinstated. Key to the relative success of the SR was the electrification programmes of the inter-war period, which meant that the average age of its rolling stock was younger than that of the other companies and that it was less vulnerable to post-war coal shortages.

=== British Railways (1948–1960) ===
The Transport Act 1947 came into effect on 1 January 1948, taking the railways of Great Britain into public ownership. The act created a new body, the British Transport Commission (BTC), reporting directly to the Minister of Transport, to take ownership of the transport infrastructure in Great Britain. Eustace Missenden, who had previously been General Manager of the Southern Railway, was appointed to lead the Railway Executive (RE), to which the management of the main-line railways was delegated. The Southern Region was one of six geographical subsidiaries of British Railways (BR) and was created to take over the day-to-day operations of the former SR and some previously independent railways in the south of England. The SR was officially dissolved on 10 June 1948, after the legal processes to transfer its assets to BR had been completed.

Under the Transport Act 1953, which came into force on 1 January 1955, the RE was dissolved and the Southern Region instead reported directly to the BTC. Greater autonomy was given to the region, and responsibility for strategic decisions was given to its board. The region was split into three divisions, each with a line manager responsible for managing rail operations. The South Eastern, the first division to be formed, was created in 1958, and the Central and South Western divisions followed in 1961.

In January 1955, the BTC published the Modernisation Plan, which set out a programme of investment for the railways. The plan, agreed by the government, envisaged the expenditure of £1,200 million (equivalent to £27,300M in 2025) in the period to 1970. It authorised the electrification of the railway lines in Kent, allowing for the complete replacement of steam with electric traction. Long-distance services on the London–Bournemouth and London–Exeter routes were converted to diesel traction, as were the services on the Tunbridge Wells–Hastings and Hastings–Ashford routes. Steam-haulage was eliminated from the South Eastern division on 26 February 1962 and from the remainder of the Southern region on 9 July 1967.

The financial position of the BTC deteriorated over the first half of the 1950s, and the British Railways accounts showed a net deficit for the first time in 1956. Competition from road transport was increasing, and a damaging industrial strike the previous year had resulted in a sharp decrease in the amount of freight being transported by rail. Falling revenues, coinciding with an increase in staff wages, created a financial crisis for the BTC, prompting the government to review its operations and remit. The Transport Act 1962 abolished the BTC and transferred the ownership of the railways to the newly created British Railways Board, which was chaired by Richard Beeching.

=== British Rail (1965–1982) ===
British Railways became British Rail on 1 January 1965, and a new brand identity was established across the railway network.

=== Sectorisation (1982–1994) ===
The organisational structure of British Rail was changed again on 4 January 1982, with the creation of five business sectors. Three of the sectors (Inter-City, Provincial, and London and South East (L&SE)) were responsible for passenger services. The new sectors were responsible for setting business parameters and specifying service levels. The regions continued to be responsible for all rail operations, including infrastructure and rolling stock maintenance, and ran train services under contract to the sectors. The sectors were able to propose large-scale infrastructure developments, although capital works costing under £1 million (equivalent to £3.57 million in 2025) could be directly authorised by the regions.

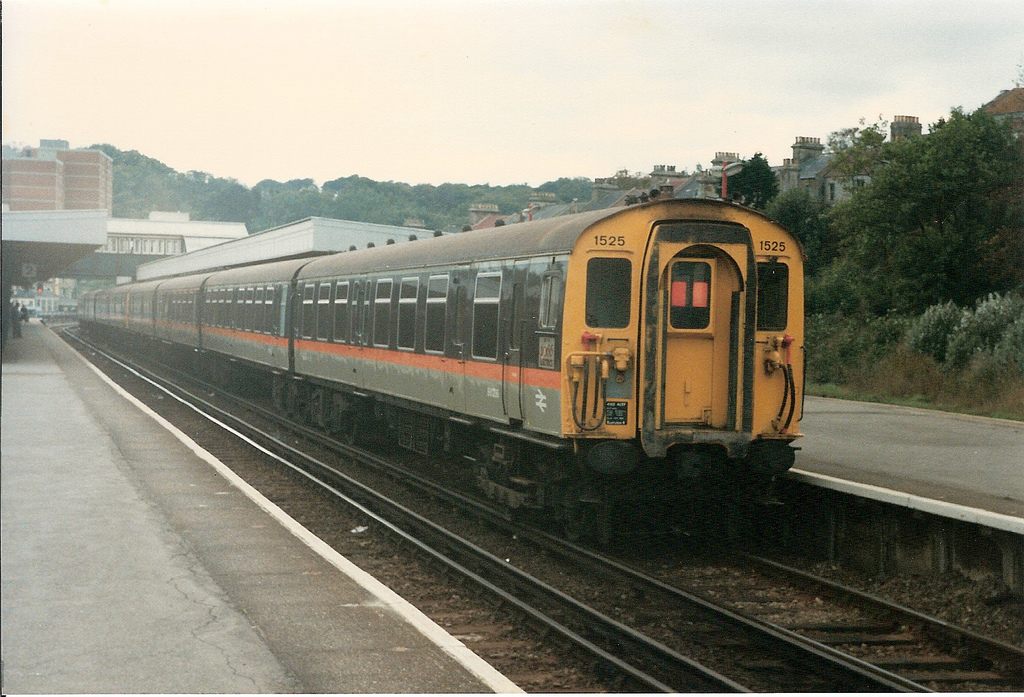
A Class 411 4-CEP unit in Jaffa Cake livery on a service to Hastings in 1986

On its formation in 1982, around two thirds of the revenue of the L&SE came from the Southern Region, and the posts of Senior Director L&SE and General Manager (Southern Region) were held by the same person. The headquarters of both the sector and the region were run as a combined operation at Waterloo station. The L&SE sector did not attempt to establish a strong brand identity, and the electrification of the Hastings line, completed in mid-1986, was primarily promoted as a Southern Region project. The corporate colour scheme for the rolling stock in the south east (the so-called Jaffa Cake livery) was only applied to a limited number of trains, including the Class 411 (4-CEP) and Class 421 (4-CIG) units operating on Kent Coast and Brighton Main Line services.

A further reorganisation took place in mid-1985, which included the separation of the joint management of the L&SE sector and the Southern Region. Additionally, Gatwick Express services were transferred to Inter-City. In November of the same year, Chris Green was appointed as the sector director. He created a new corporate identity for the L&SE sector, launching the Network SouthEast (NSE) brand on 10 June 1986. The Southern Region continued to run rail services until April 1992, when the direct management of all passenger operations, infrastructure and rolling stock maintenance was transferred to NSE. Both the Southern Region and NSE were formally abolished on 31 March 1994, when the sector was divided into shadow franchises in preparation for privatisation.

== Line and station closures ==
=== Line closures ===
==== Pre-Beeching ====
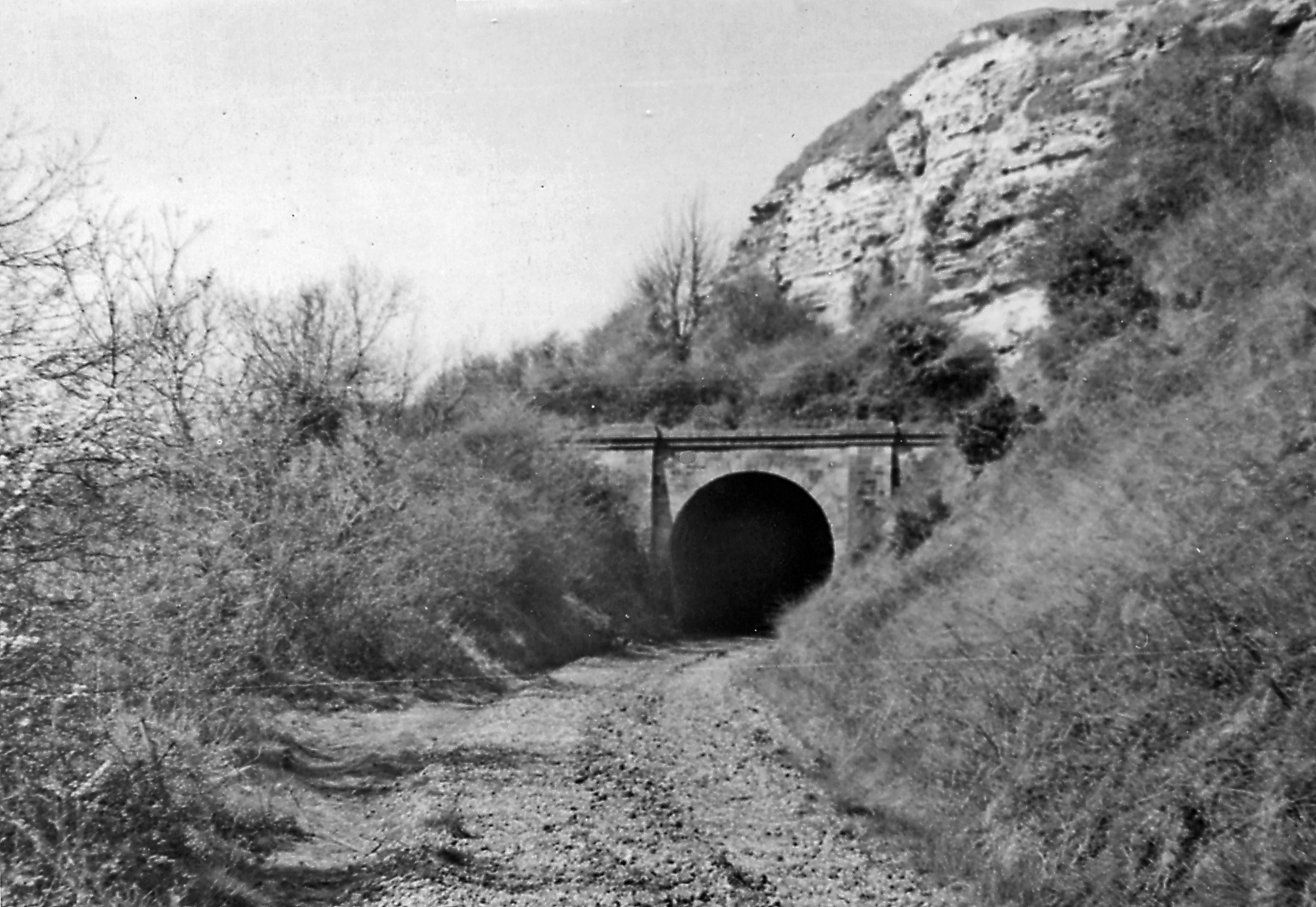
St Lawrence Tunnel on the Ventnor West branch line in 1954, two years after closure

Passenger lines closed by the Southern Region between 1948 and 1963:

- East Kent Light Railway (Shepherds Well–Wingham (Canterbury Road)) closed on 30 October 1948.
- Sheppey Light Railway (Queenborough–Leysdown) closed on 4 December 1950.
- Hundred of Hoo Railway (Port Victoria- Grain) closed on 11 June 1951.
- Sandgate branch line (Sandling–Hythe) closed on 3 December 1951.
- Portland Branch Railway (Melcombe Regis–Easton) closed on 3 March 1952
- Bulford to Grateley closed on 30 June 1952
- Ventnor West branch line (Merstone–Ventnor West) closed on 13 September 1952.
- Abbotsbury to Upwey closed on 1 December 1952
- Bembridge to Brading closed on 21 September 1953.
- Freshwater, Yarmouth and Newport Railway (Freshwater–Newport) closed on 21 September 1953.
- Fareham to Gosport Line (Fareham–Gosport) closed on 8 June 1953.
- Gravesend West Line (Fawkham Junction–Gravesend West) closed on 3 August 1953. BR asserted that it would save £11,400 per annum (equivalent to £277,000 in 2025) by withdrawing passenger services from the line.
- Kent and East Sussex Railway (Headcorn Junction–Robertsbridge) closed on 4 January 1954. BR asserted that it would save £20,000 per annum (£480,000 in 2025) by withdrawing passenger services from the line.
- Crystal Palace and South London Junction Railway (Nunhead–Crystal Palace (High Level)) closed on 20 September 1954.
- Meon Valley Railway (Alton–Fareham) closed on 5 February 1955.
- Midhurst Railways (Petersfield–Midhurst and Midhurst–Pulborough) closed on 7 February 1955.
- Tidworth to Ludgershall closed 19 September 1955.
- Sandown to Newport closed 6 February 1956
- Bordon Light Railway (Bentley–Bordon) closed on 16 September 1957.
- Bluebell line (East Grinstead–Lewes) closed on 17 March 1958.
- Didcot, Newbury and Southampton Railway (Newbury–Winchester (Chesil)) closed on 7 March 1960.
- Hawkhurst Branch (Paddock Wood- Hawkhurst) closed on 12 June 1961
- Midland and South Western Junction Railway (Andover-Swindon) closed on 11 September 1961
- Winchester (Chesil)–Shawford closed after last train on 9 September 1961
- Westerham Valley branch line (Dunton Green–Westerham) closed on 28 October 1961. Much of the trackbed west of Chevening Halt is covered by the M25 motorway.
- Hundred of Hoo Railway (Hoo Junction–Grain and Hoo Junction–Allhallows-on-Sea) closed on 4 December 1961.

==== Post-Beeching ====
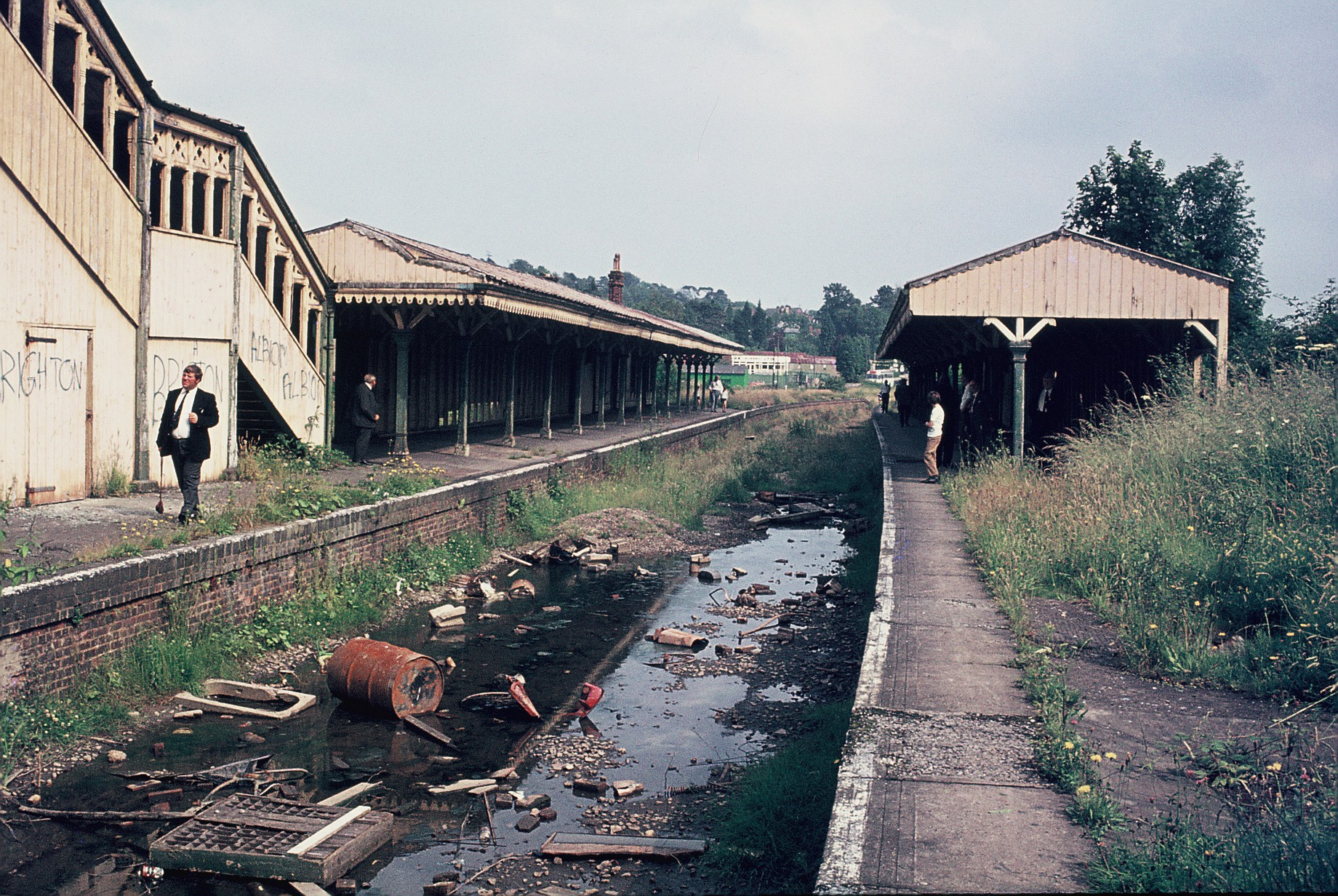
Heathfield station on the Cuckoo Line in 1972, seven years after closure

Passenger lines closed by the Southern Region between 1963 and 1992:

- Ardingly branch line (Copyhold Junction–Horsted Keynes) closed on 28 October 1963.
- Hayling Island branch line (Havant–Hayling Island) closed on 4 November 1963.
- Part of Southampton and Dorchester Railway (Brockenhurst–Hamworthy) closed on 4 May 1964.
- Part of Salisbury and Dorset Junction Railway (Alderbury Junction–West Moors) closed on 4 May 1964.
- Bexhill West branch line (Crowhurst–Bexhill West) closed on 15 June 1964.
- Part of the Sprat and Winkle Line (Andover Junction–Romsey) closed on 7 September 1964.
- Cranleigh line (Guildford–Christ's Hospital) closed on 14 June 1965.
- Part of the Cuckoo Line (Eridge–Hailsham) closed on 14 June 1965.
- Bournemouth West branch line closed on 6 September 1965.
- Fawley branch line (Totton–Fawley) closed on 14 February 1966.
- Part of the Isle of Wight Central Railway Smallbrook Junction–Cowes via Newport) closed on 21 February 1966.
- Part of the Isle of Wight Railway (Shanklin–Ventnor) on 17 April 1966.
- Somerset and Dorset Joint Railway Poole to Bath Green Park/Bristol/Highbridge closed on 7 March 1966
- Steyning Line (Christ's Hospital–Shoreham-by-Sea) closed on 7 March 1966.
- Part of the Three Bridges–Tunbridge Wells line (Three Bridges–Groombridge) closed on 2 January 1967.
- New Romney branch line (Appledore–New Romney and Littlestone-on-Sea) closed on 6 March 1967.
- Part of the Cuckoo line Hailsham–Polegate) closed on 9 September 1968.
- Part of the Wealden Line (Uckfield–Lewes) closed on 24 February 1969.
- Eastleigh–Romsey line (Eastleigh–Romsey) closed on 5 May 1969.
- Swanage Railway (Swanage–Wareham) closed on 3 January 1972.
- Mid-Hants Railway (Alton–Winchester) closed on 5 February 1973.
- Part of the Wealden Line (Eridge–Tunbridge Wells) closed on 6 July 1985.
- Part of the Woodside and South Croydon Joint Railway (Woodside–Selsdon) closed on 17 May 1983.
- Holborn Viaduct to Blackfriars closed on 29 January 1990 replaced by City Thameslink on new alignment of Thameslink Line.

=== Station closures ===
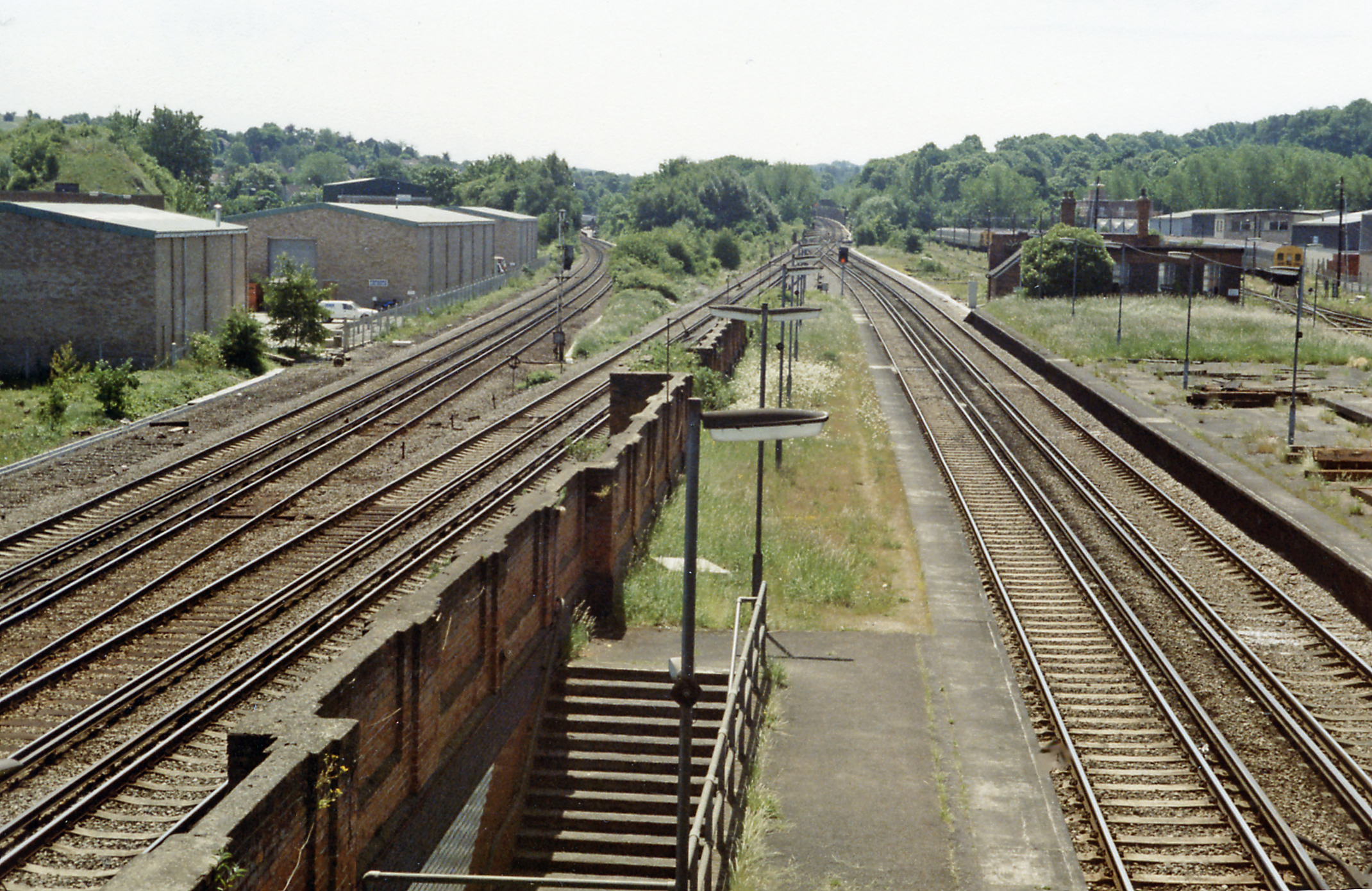
Coulsdon North station in June 1983, before its closure that October

Passenger stations closed by the Southern Region on lines that were open in 1992:

- Margate East on the Chatham Main Line closed on 4 May 1953
- Smeeth on the South Eastern Main Line closed on 4 January 1954
- Stonehall and Lydden Halt on the Chatham Main Line closed to passengers on 5 April 1954.
- Wilton North closed on 19 September 1955
- Wylye closed on 19 September 1955
- Codford closed on 19 September 1955
- Heytesbury closed on 19 September 1955
- Holland Road Halt on the West Coastway line closed on 7 May 1956.
- Upwey Wishing Well Halt on South West Main Line closed on 7 January 1957
- Monkton and Came Halt on South West Main Line closed on 7 January 1957
- Nursling closed on 16 September 1957.
- Snailham Halt on the Marshlink line closed on 2 February 1959.
- Hothfield Halt on the Maidstone line closed 2 November 1959
- Teston Crossing Halt on the Medway Valley Line closed 2 November 1959
- Denton Halt on the Hundred of Hoo Railway closed 4 December 1961
- Oakley on the West of England line closed on 17 June 1963.
- Hurstbourne on the South West Main Line closed on 6 April 1964.
- Knowle Halt on the Eastleigh–Fareham line closed on 6 April 1964.
- Reading Southern on the North Downs Line closed to passengers on 6 September 1965 and services were diverted to Platform 4a at Reading railway station.
- Folkestone East on the South Eastern Main Line closed on 6 September 1965.
- Boscombe on the South West Main Line closed on 4 October 1965.
- Grove Ferry and Upstreet on Ashford–Ramsgate line closed on 3 January 1966.
- Wilton South on the South West Main Line closed on 7 March 1966
- Southampton Terminus and Northam on the South West Main Line closed on 5 September 1966.
- St Leonards West Marina on the East Coastway line closed on 10 July 1967.
- Idmiston Halt on the South West Main Line closed on 9 September 1968.
- Porton on the South West Main Line closed on 9 September 1968.
- Mountfield Halt on the Hastings line, closed on 6 October 1969.
- Chislet Colliery Halt on the Ashford to Ramsgate line closed on 4 October 1971
- East Brixton on the South London line closed on 6 January 1976.
- Coulsdon North on the Brighton Main Line closed on 3 October 1983.
- Radipole on the South West Main Line officially closed on 6 February 1984.
- Eltham Park closed on 17 March 1985 replaced by Eltham.
- Ampress Works Halt on the Lymington branch line, closed in 1989 when the factory that it served also closed.

== Station developments ==
=== New stations ===
- Ampress Works Halt opened on 1 October 1956.
- Southampton Airport Parkway opened on 1 April 1966.
- Moulsecoomb opened on 10 June 1980.
- Eltham opened on 17 March 1985, replacing two existing stations which were closed to allow for the construction of the A2 Rochester Way relief road.
- Winnersh Triangle opened on 12 May 1986. The total cost of £375,000 was funded jointly by BR, Berkshire County Council and Slough Estates PLC.
- Lake opened on 9 July 1987 to serve an expanding residential area on the Isle of Wight between Sandown and Shanklin.
- Martins Heron opened on 3 October 1988. The total cost of £500,000 was funded jointly by BR and by Berkshire County Council.
- Hedge End opened on 4 May 1990 as part of the electrification of the lines in the Portsmouth area.
- City Thameslink opened on 29 May 1990, replacing Holborn Viaduct station.
- Smallbrook Junction opened on 20 July 1991 to allow interchange between the Island line and the Isle of Wight Steam Railway.

=== Resited stations ===
- Twickenham opened on 28 March 1954.
- Gatwick Airport opened on 28 May 1958 on site of the former Gatwick station, which had served Gatwick Racecourse on racedays only.
- Swale opened on 20 April 1960 on a new railway alignment for the construction of the new Kingsferry Bridge.
- Hurst Green opened on 12 June 1961.
- Crawley opened on 28 July 1968.
- Polegate opened on 25 May 1986 around half a mile to the west of the previous station and closer to the town centre, following the closure of the Cuckoo Line.
- Epsom Downs opened on 14 February 1989, around 350 yd (320 m) to the north of the previous station. The relocation enabled the construction of a new housing estate.
- Uckfield opened on 13 May 1991. Opened on the other side of the High Street to eliminate the level crossing.

=== Reconstructed and redeveloped stations ===
- Portsmouth Harbour: The station was damaged in air raids in December 1940 and January 1941, resulting in its closure. One platform reopened on 24 February 1941, but work to rebuild the remainder of the station was not completed until after nationalisation.
- Elephant & Castle: The station was damaged in air raids during the Second World War. Reconstruction work began in 1948.
- Chichester: A new station building, designed by N. G. T. Wikeley, was built in 1961.
- Folkestone Central: The Victorian station building was replaced in 1962 by a new structure, also designed by Wikeley, as part of the project to electrify the South Eastern Main Line.
- Holborn Viaduct: The Holborn Viaduct Hotel, which had been damaged during the Second World War, was demolished and replaced with a 10-storey office block in 1963.
- Bracknell: A new station building, incorporating a seven-storey office block, was opened in 1976.
- Camberley: The Victorian station building was demolished and was replaced by a larger structure that integrated the station with a three-storey office block. The work was completed in 1977.
- Dorking: The Victorian station building was demolished and was replaced by a larger structure, designed by Gordon Lavington, that integrated the station with offices for Biwater. The work was completed in 1982.

== Electrification and resignalling ==
By 1938, around 620 route miles (1,000 km) and around 1,770 track miles (2,850 km) of the Southern Railway (SR) had been electrified using the third-rail system. In June the following year, the SR approved the electrification of the Oxted line from South Croydon to Horsted Keynes via East Grinstead, but the outbreak of the Second World War prevented the start of works. Nevertheless, the company continued to develop its electrification plans and, in March 1942, the board of directors indicated that it would complete the electrification of the south-eastern and central sections of its network after the war had ended. A report produced by the SR in February 1946, recommended that the extension of the 600 V third-rail system and provided an estimated cost of around £7.1 million (equivalent to £257M in 2025) to complete the electrification of the south-eastern and central sections. If the lines to Salisbury and Bournemouth were to be included, the total estimated cost would be £10.7M (£387M in 2025). That October, the board approved the electrification of all lines east of Portsmouth and Reading by 1955 at an estimated cost of £15M (£543M in 2025).

Following the nationalisation of the railways in 1948, there was no public money available to invest in large-scale infrastructure improvements, and the SR's plans were cancelled. Instead, the more limited programme undertaken by the Southern Region in the late 1940s and early 1950s was focused on signalling upgrades and the renewal of the power supply system, which was approaching life-expiry. In 1949, work started on installing four-aspect colour-light signals on the Brighton Main Line north of Coulsdon North, a project completed in May 1955. In November the following year, the Railway Executive approved the reconfiguration of the electrical supply network, which included connecting the system to the National Grid, the construction of 45 new substations and the closure of the Durnford Road power station, which had been built by the LSWR. The work, which allowed the lengthening of suburban trains from eight to ten cars, was planned so that the traction voltage could be raised from 600 V to 750 V at a later date. Ten-coach trains began running on the Bexleyheath line on 14 June 1954 and on the Dartford Loop Line via Sidcup a year later.

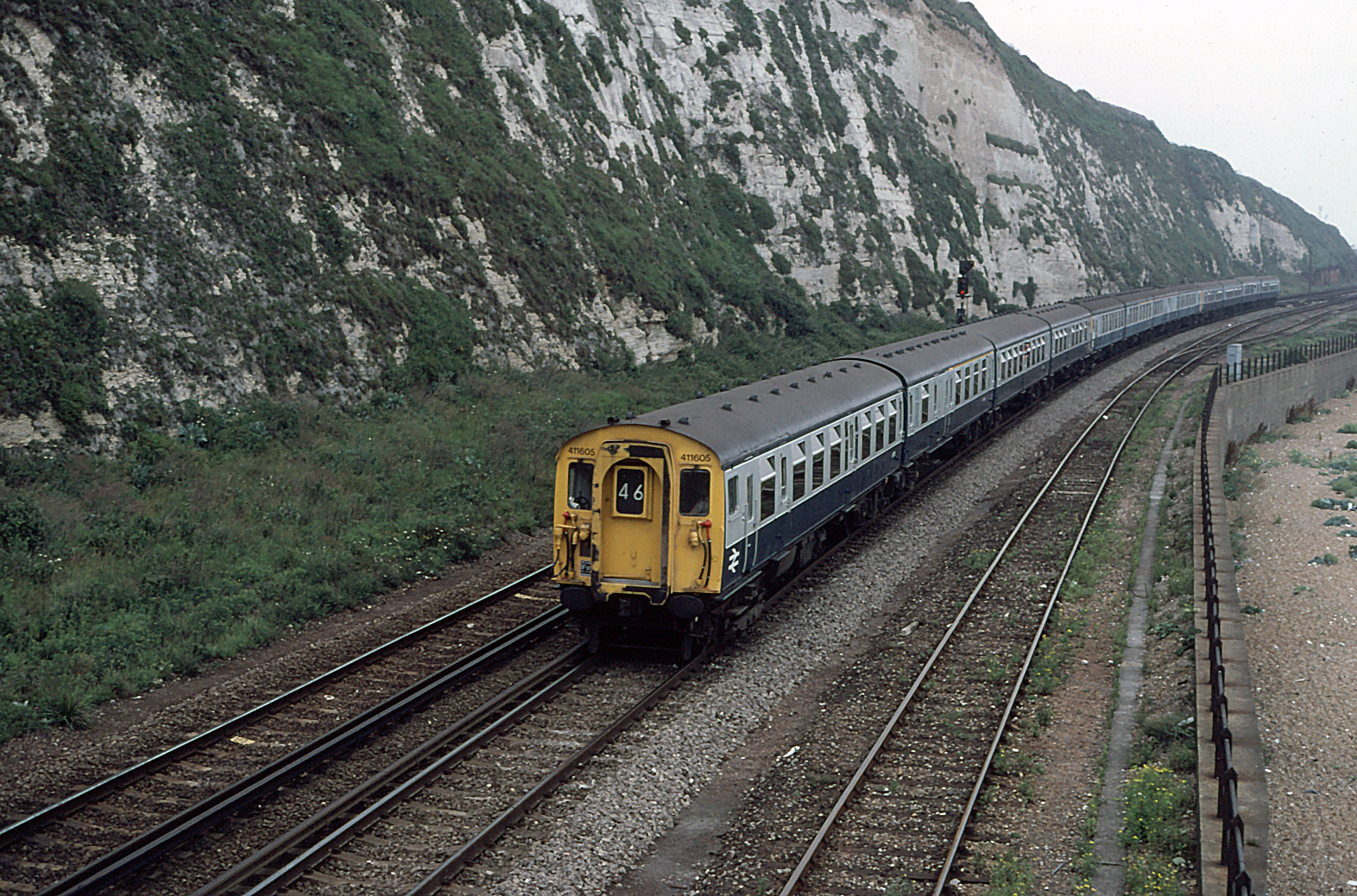
A Class 411 4-CEP unit leads a 12-coach train along the South Eastern Main Line between Dover Priory and Folkestone Central

Extensions of the third-rail network in the region were examined as part of a report on motive power policy, published by the Railway Executive in October 1951 and subsequently endorsed by the British Transport Commission (BTC). The report recommended the electrification of the remaining steam-operated main lines from London to Bournemouth, Hastings and Dover. The Modernisation Plan of 1955 recommended the electrification of all lines serving the Kent coast, which was approved by the BTC in February 1956. (Note: In November 1955, the British Transport Commission elected to install 25 kV overhead line in all future electrification programmes, except for those on the Southern Region, which were to use the third-rail system.) The project was designed to eliminate all steam-hauled passenger and freight services over the lines that it covered. Work began in 1957 and was split into two phases, both of which included the installation of colour-light signalling. The first phase, around 78 route miles (126 km), electrified the lines from Gillingham to Ramsgate and Dover Marine via Faversham. It included the alterations to the track layout between Shortlands and Bickley Junctions, the extension of quadruple track east from Bickley Junction to Swanley and the realignment of the connecting spur lines at Chiselhurst Junction, where the South East and Chatham Main Lines cross. The new electric timetable was launched on 15 June 1959, with the typical journey time between London and Ramsgate reduced by 42 minutes. The second phase, around 157 route miles (253 km), electrified the lines from Sevenoaks to Ramsgate and Dover via Tonbridge and Ashford. The new timetable was introduced on 12 June 1961, although the rebuilding of Ashford station was not completed until 1966.

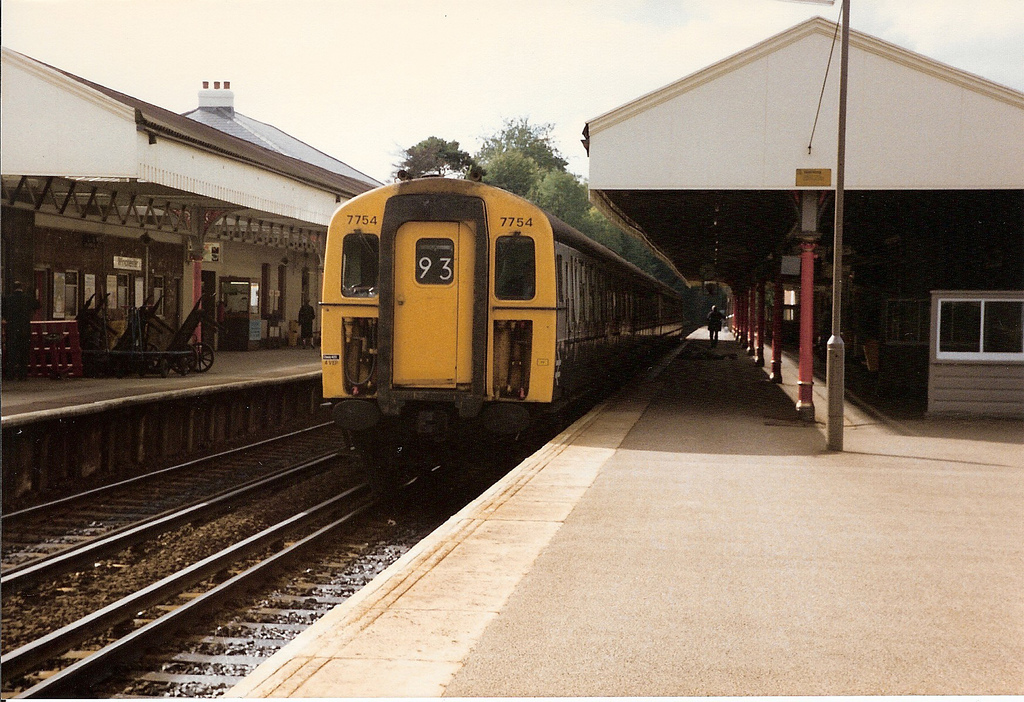
A Class 423 4VEP unit at Winchester in 1986

In the early 1960s, passenger services between London and Bournemouth via Southampton Central were still hauled by steam locomotives. With the withdrawal of steam power approaching, electrification of the South West Main Line between Sturt Lane (near Frimley) and Bournemouth was authorised in September 1964. The project included the replacement of jointed track with continuous welded rail. Regular electric trains from London began operating in public service to Basingstoke on 2 January 1967 and to Bournemouth on 10 July 1967. The final steam-hauled public service between Waterloo and Bournemouth ran on 9 July 1967. Electrification between Bournemouth and Weymouth, costing £53 million project (£158 million in 2025), was authorised in January 1986 To reduce costs, a 5 mi (8.0 km) stretch of line was singled between Moreton and Dorchester South, and the capacity of the 11 kV supply from the National Grid limited train lengths to a maximum of five coaches. The third rail was energised on 11 January 1988, and public electric services began on 16 May that year.

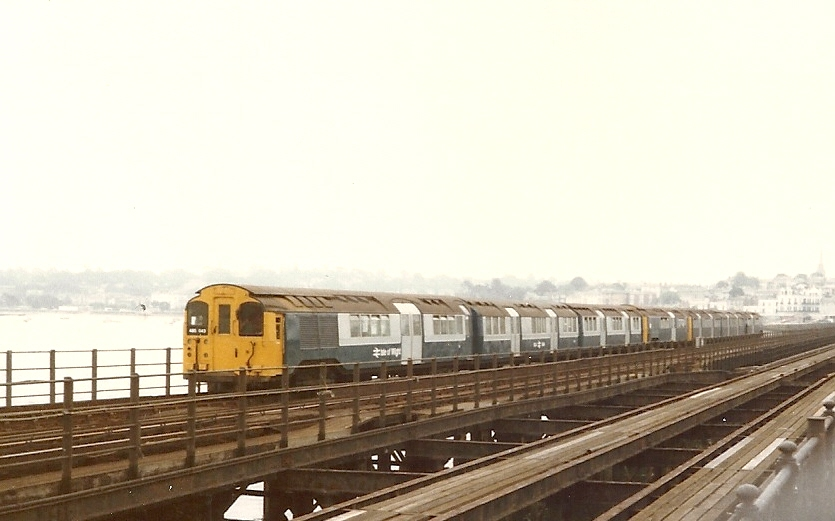
A Class 485 unit on Ryde Pier in 1984

Although the vast majority of railway lines on the Isle of Wight were closed by the late 1960s, the Island line between Ryde Pier Head and Shanklin was allowed to remain open, as this section carried the majority of the summer holiday traffic. The steam locomotives and carriages that operated services on the island dated from before the formation of the Southern Railway and were life expired. Since the clearance in Ryde Tunnel was around 10 inches (25 cm) lower than that of the mainland railways, standard-sized rolling stock could not be used. Instead, the line was electrified using the third-rail system at 630 V DC for a total cost of £500,000 (equivalent to £8 million in 2025), to allow former London Underground tube stock to operate. The new electric timetable began operation on 20 March 1967.

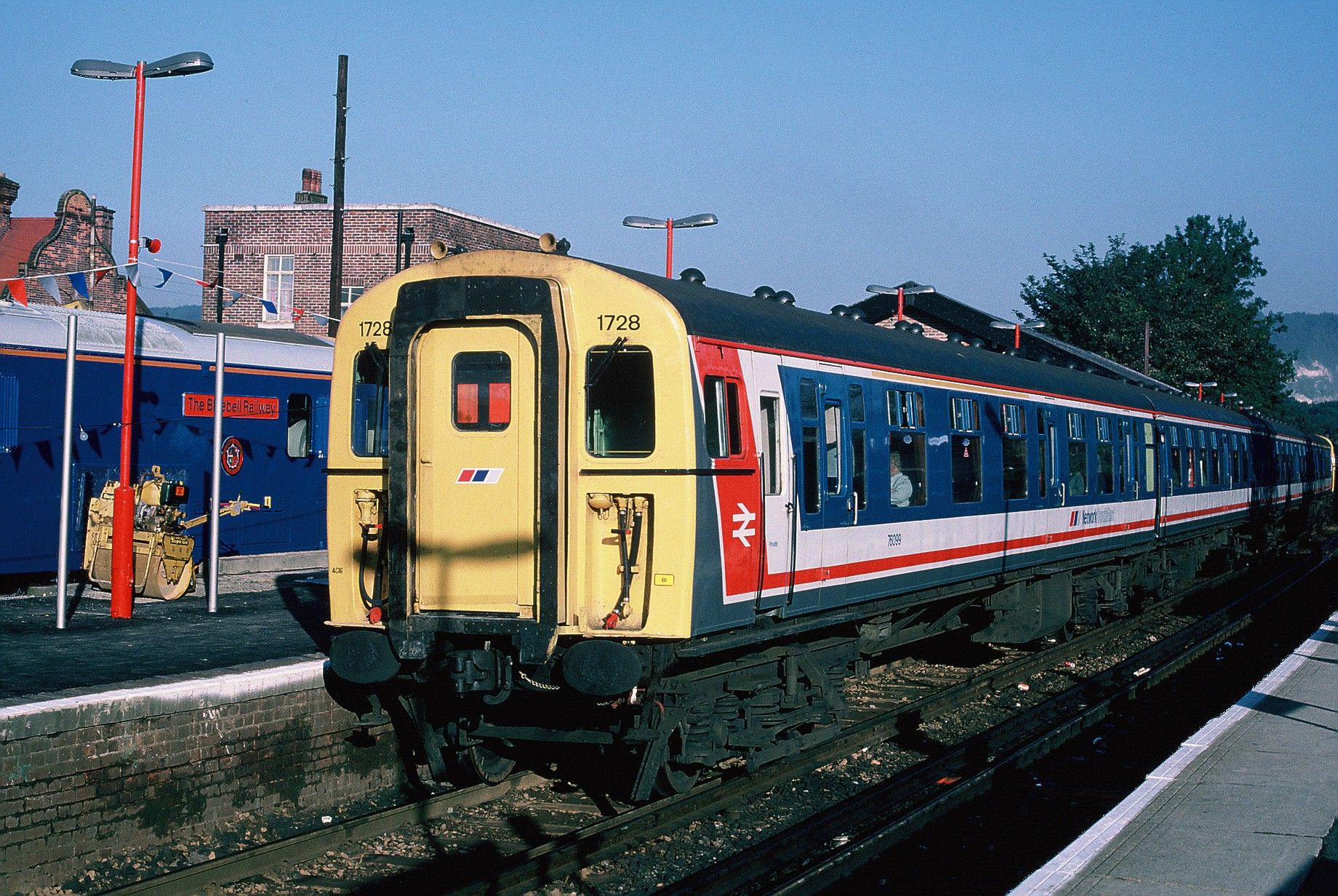
A Class 421 4CIG unit at the Oxted "Electrification Gala" in September 1987

The electrification of the Hastings line and the East Grinstead branch of the Oxted line in the 1980s, was driven by a commitment to remove asbestos from rolling stock by the end of 1988. British Rail assessed that it was more cost effective to electrify both lines and to operate them with electrical multiple units from its existing fleet, rather than to pay for the decontamination of the diesel units, which were approaching life expiry. The Hastings line electrification, which including the singling of the line through three tunnels to allow standard rolling stock to operate, was authorised in 1983, and the electric timetable began operating on 12 May 1986. Electrification of the Oxted line between South Croydon and Sanderstead was completed in May 1983, and the extension to East Grinstead began operating on 5 October 1987. The works on the Oxted line included resignalling south of Woldingham and transferring control to a new panel box at Oxted.

The Eastleigh–Fareham line and the West Coastway line between St Denys and Havant, were electrified in 1990 at a cost of £22 million (equivalent to £54M in 2025). The scheme was officially opened on 13 May 1990.

== Traction and rolling stock ==
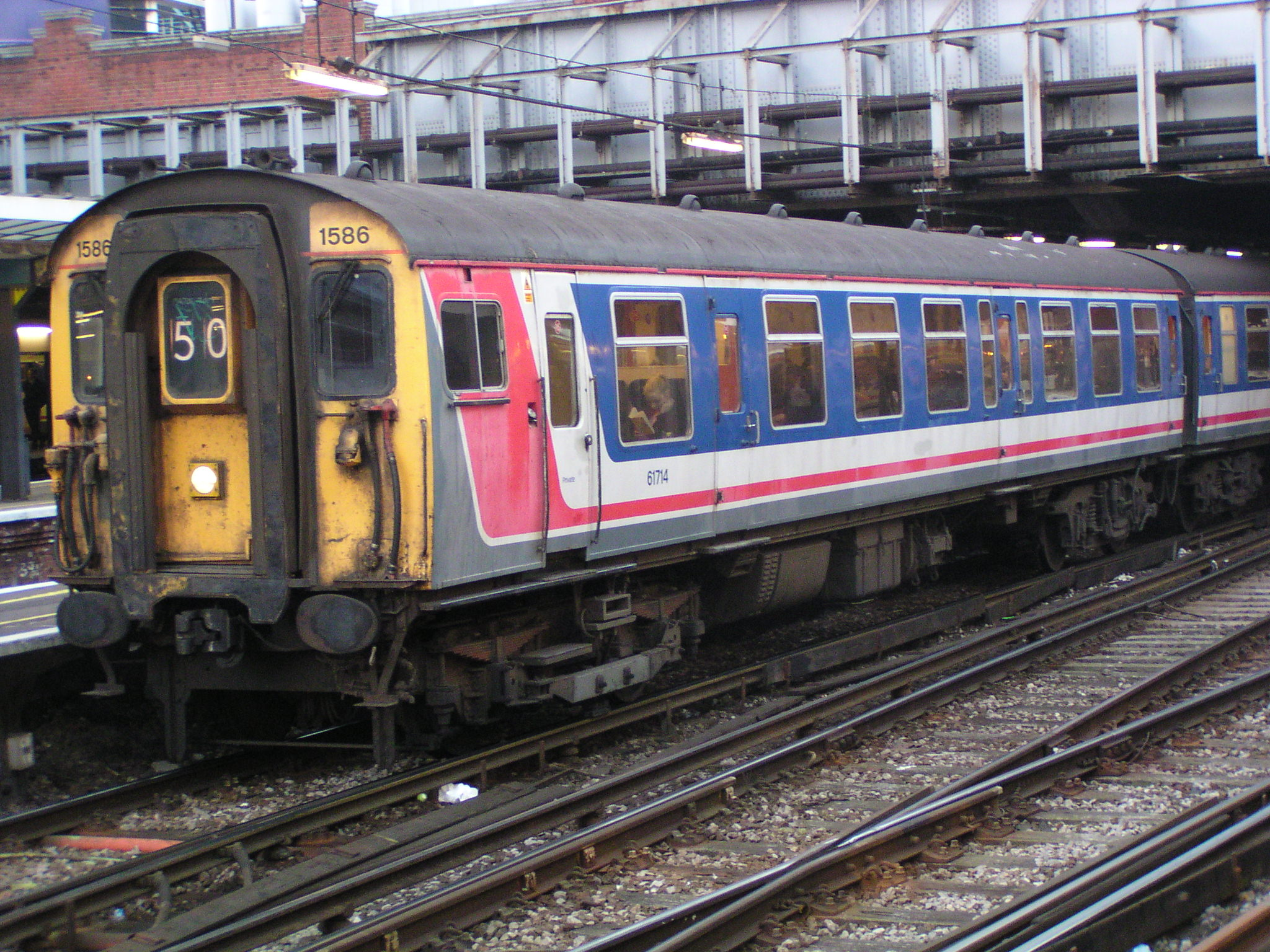
Class 411 (4-CEP) "slam-door" EMU at London Victoria station, in Network SouthEast livery (March 2003)

At the time of its creation the Southern Region still had large numbers of steam locomotives The Southern Region also owned three locomotive works at Ashford, Brighton, and Eastleigh, two carriage works (Eastleigh and Lancing) and a wagon works at Ashford. Most of these closed before privatisation.

Unlike the other regions of British Railways, the Southern Region did not rush to withdraw its steam locomotives, instead using them right up to the completion of large-scale electrification. Consequently, the Southern Region was the last region in Britain to regularly use steam on high-speed expresses and to have steam operated branch lines. Steam traction over the region finally ended in July 1967.

=== Electric ===
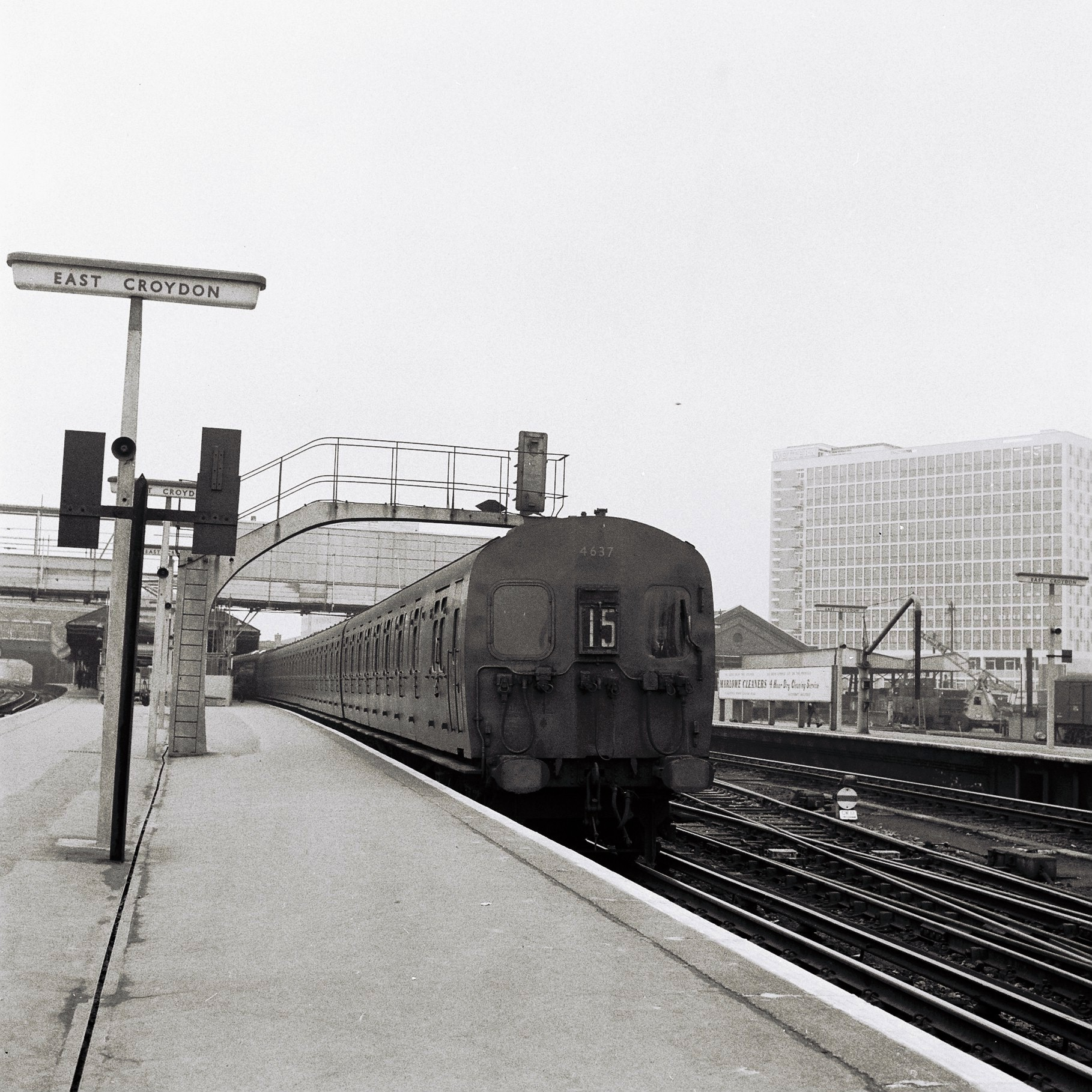
A 4-SUB at East Croydon in 1964

4-SUB units had been introduced by the Southern Railway (SR) in 1941, having been ordered shortly before the start of the Second World War. Between 1942 and 1945, the SR lengthened some of its existing 3-SUB units, which were then given the 4SUB designation. The Southern Region of British Railways produced further 4-SUBs between 1948 and 1951. The first ten units were delivered in late 1948, and were primarily to replace units destroyed during the war. They were followed by a further 23 units fitted with a newer motor design. The final batch of 123 units was produced between May 1949 and December 1951. Withdrawal of the 4-SUBs built for the Southern Region began in October 1972 and continued until the final unit was removed from passenger service in September 1983.

Class 402 2-HAL units had been introduced by the SR in 1938–39 to work semi-fast services in north-west Kent. Seven additional units were built by the Southern Region in 1948, to replace 2-NOL and Class 401 2BIL units that had been damaged beyond repair during the war. One further 2-HAL set was built in 1955.

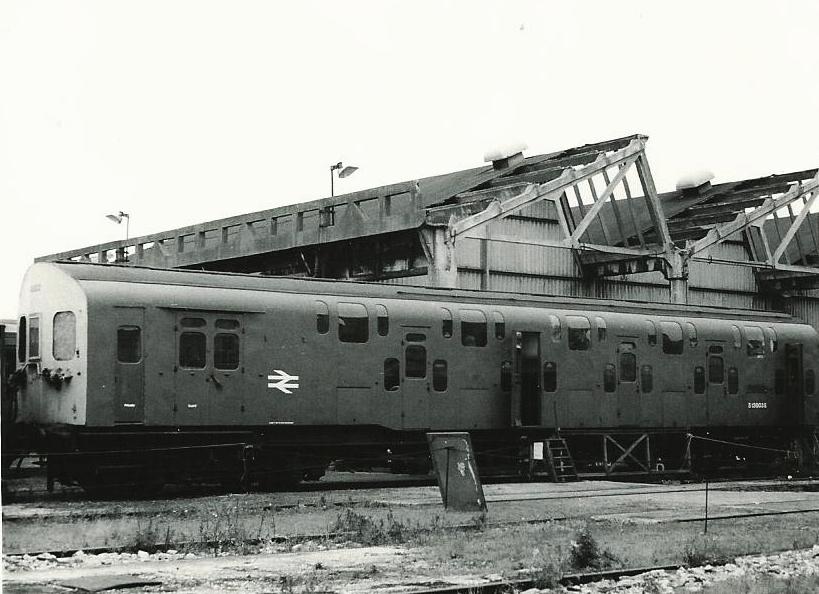
An SR Class 4DD in 1972, the year after their withdrawal from service

SR Class 4DD electric multiple units were built in 1949 to operate the most overcrowded suburban services between Dartford, Charing Cross and Cannon Street. These double decker trains could take advantage of the greater clearances on the suburban lines in north-west Kent and were 4.5 in (11 cm) taller than other rolling stock. Only two 4-car units were produced, with each unit able to accommodate 936 seated passengers, compared to around 600 in a single-deck unit of a similar length. Operation of the units required longer station dwell times, because of the small number of doors in each carriage. Additionally, passengers criticised the poor ventilation in the upper compartments, which did have not opening windows due to the tight loading gauge. The 4DDs continued in service until 1 October 1971, but no further units were produced.

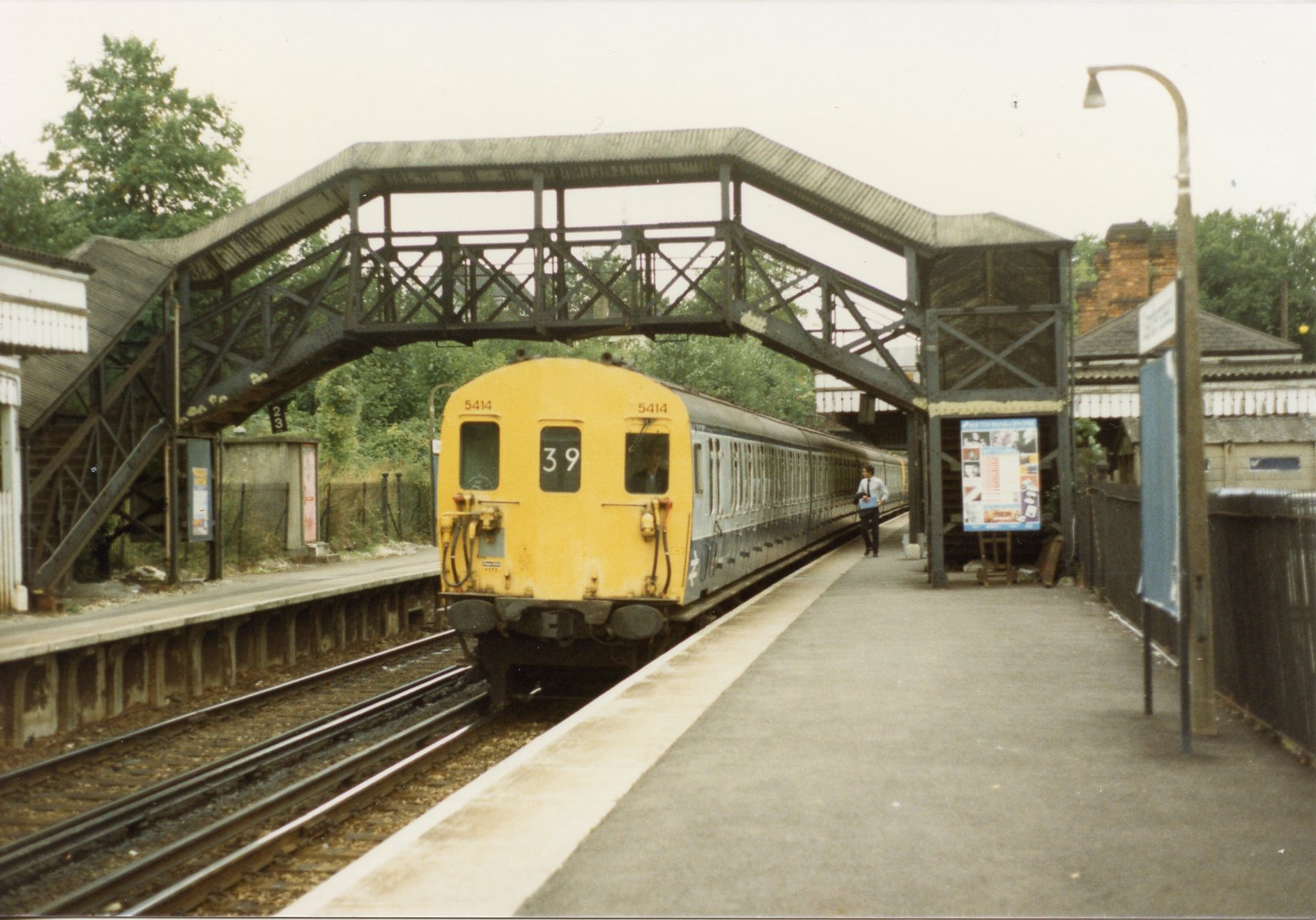
A Class 415 4-EPB unit at Sanderstead in 1986

Class 415 4-EPB units were introduced to passenger service in January 1952, initially on the New Guildford line. All incorporated bogies reclaimed from withdrawn pre-war units and the first 53 also had a trailer vehicle repurposed from scrapped 4-SUBs. The 2-car Class 416 2-EPBs, based on the Mark 1 coach, were built in 1953. They were primarily intended to allow lengthening of 8-car suburban services to 10 carriages, but were also used individually to replace 2-NOL units. In total, 213 4-EPBs and 79 2-EPBs were produced.

The 4-car Class 455 units were built for suburban services on the Central and South Western Divisions. They used the Mark 3 bodyshell and had a top speed of 75 mph (121 km/h). The 455/8s were introduced in 1983 on the lines from London Waterloo and replaced 4-SUBs and 4-EPBs. The 455/7s, incorporating a trailer vehicle from a Class 508 unit, entered into service the following year. The 455/9s were introduced in 1985, and in May of that year, 36 455/8s were transferred from the South Western to the Central Division. In total, 137 Class 455s were constructed.

The 5-car Class 442 units were built for the electrification of the South West Main Line between Bournemouth and Weymouth. They also used the Mark 3 bodyshell and had a top speed of 100 mph (161 km/h). They entered service in May 1988, operating express long-distance services between London Waterloo and Weymouth.

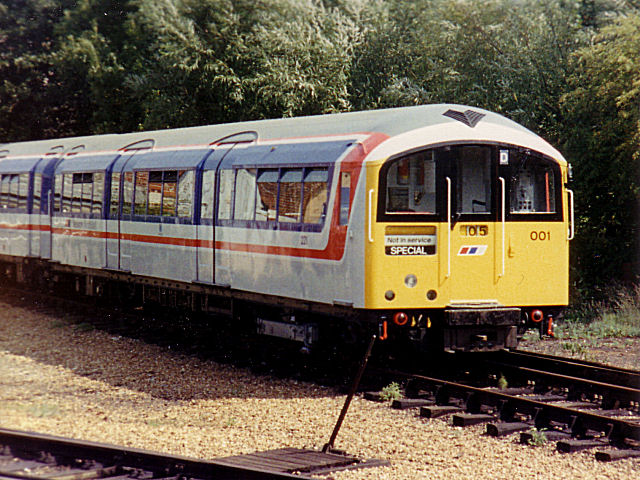
A Class 483 unit at Ryde St John's Road in 1989

The Island Line, between Ryde Pier Head and Shanklin, was electrified in the mid-1960s to allow steam haulage to be eliminated. The new electric timetable began in March 1967, operated by 4-car Class 485 and 3-car Class 486 units, which had been created by converting London Underground Standard Stock. By the early 1980s, the trains were suffering from salt corrosion, and were replaced in July 1989 by converted London Underground 1938 Stock, designated Class 483.

=== Diesel ===
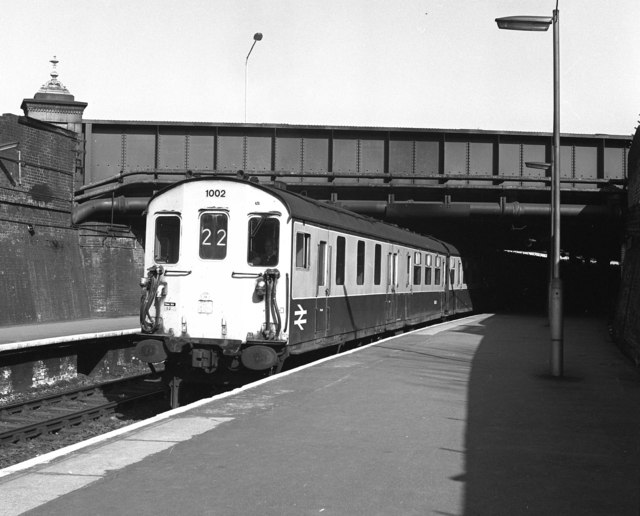
A Class 201 6S unit at Tunbridge Wells in 1980

Three classes of diesel multiple units, collectively known as the Hastings Diesels, were introduced in the late 1950s to eliminate steam-hauled services between London and Hastings. The six-car units were built with a width of 9 ft (2.74 m), to fit within the narrow loading gauge of the tunnels on the Tonbridge–Hastings line, and had a top speed of 75 mph (121 km/h). The Class 201 6S units, of which only seven were built, were introduced to passenger service in May 1957. They were constructed on 56 ft 11 in (17.35 m) underframes that had originally been intended to be used for locomotive-hauled carriages. The nine Class 202 6L units were constructed on standard-length 63 ft 5 in (19.33 m) underframes. They were followed by the seven Class 203 6B units, which were identical to the 6L units, except that one standard-class carriage was replaced by a buffet coach. All Hastings Diesel units had entered passenger service by August 1958. The Hastings line was electrified and the new electric timetable began in May 1986, enabling the withdrawal of the units from the line. Coaches from two Class 201 units and three Class 202 units were retained and transferred to Selhurst Depot, but the majority of the Hastings Diesels were scrapped.

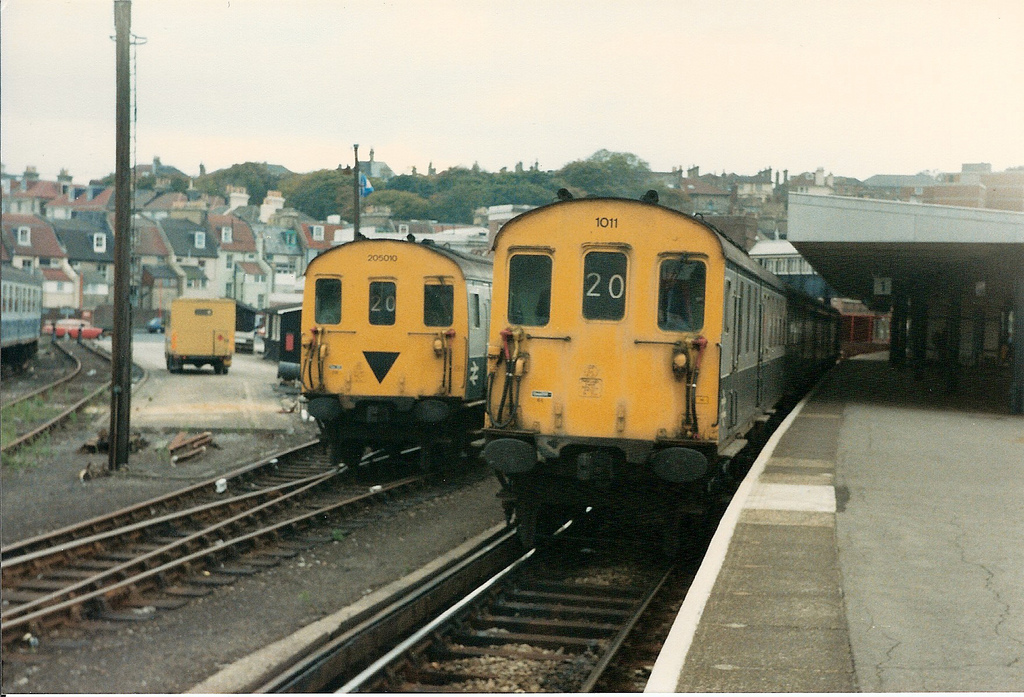
A Class 205 3H unit (left) and a Class 202 6L (right) at Hastings in 1986

The Class 205 2H units were two-car diesel multiple units were built to operate local services over unelectrified lines in Hampshire, including from Southampton Terminus to Alton and from Portsmouth Harbour to Salisbury, Andover and Southampton Central. The first eighteen units were introduced in 1957, enabling steam haulage to be eliminated from the routes by November of that year. Four more 2H units were constructed the following year. In 1959, the two-car 2H units were lengthened to three cars and were given a new 3H classification.. Four additional three-car variants were built at the end of 1959. After the closures of the Steyning Line and the Fawley branch line, units began to operate services on the Oxted line and by 1974, 14 units had been transferred.

The three-car Class 207 3D units were built to operate services on the Oxted line. In total, 19 units were produced, all of which entered passenger service in 1962. Although similar to the Class 205s, they had a width of 8 ft 6 in (2.59 m) to allow them to operate between Tunbridge Wells and Tunbridge Wells West. They were originally built with blue asbestos insulation, which was removed from seven of the units in the mid-1980s, to allow them to continue operating after the electrification of the line to East Grinstead. In the early 1990s, three units were reduced to two carriages and modified to allow them to work services on the Marshlink line. They were re-extended to three carriages in 1995 with the addition of former Class 411 4-CEP carriages.

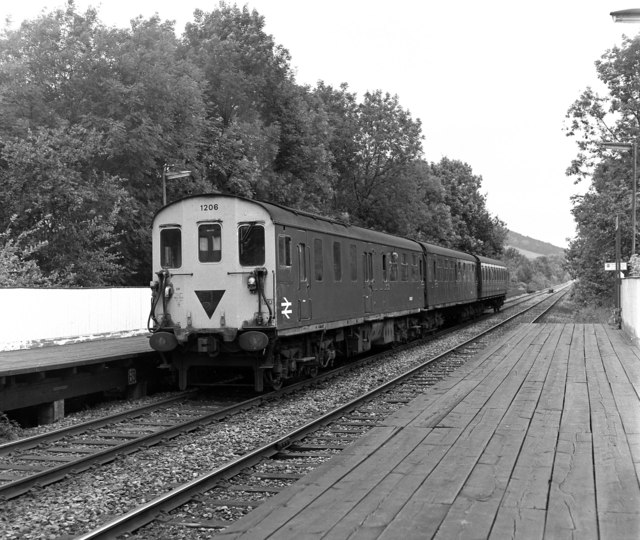
A Class 206 Tadpole unit at Dorking Deepdene in 1979

The three-car Class 206 3R units were created in the mid-1960s to operate services on the North Downs Line and Redhill–Tonbridge line. Their introduction, in January 1965, enable the withdrawal of steam-hauled services between Reading and Tonbridge. They were formed from two narrow-body former 6H units coupled to the standard-width driving trailer vehicle from a 2-EPB. Three of the five compartments in the former EPB trailers were modified to carry letters and parcels, with a total capacity of 7 long tons (7.1 t) for mail. The discrepancy in the sizes of the carriages gave rise to the nickname Tadpoles, which was used in some official documents. Diesel Multiple Units from the Western Region were introduced to the North Downs Line in 1979 and the final Class 206 unit ran in passenger service on the line in May 1981.

== Channel Tunnel ==
=== 1960s and 1970s ===
In 1960, the Channel Tunnel Study Group, a consortium of companies in which both BR and SNCF had financial interests, issued new proposals for a tunnel between England and France. Rival plans for a bridge between Dover and Calais were proposed the following year. The two schemes were evaluated by a joint working group established by the British and French governments, which determined that the tunnel scheme was both technically feasible and "preferable economically". The agreement between the two governments to build the tunnel was announced on 6 February 1964. A further agreement was reached in 1973, based on the principle that the cost to the British government would be £120 million (equivalent to £1,300M in 2025).

The British Railways Board (BRB) began to explore options for connecting the tunnel to the UK railway network. It proposed a high-speed route between London and Folkestone that would allow a total journey time of around 2 3/4 hours between London and Paris. Part of the route would run over existing lines, which were to be upgraded to a line speed of 300 km/h (186 mph). Bypass lines would be constructed for Ashford and Tonbridge stations, and a new double-track railway would be built from Edenbridge to South Croydon, assuming that the Oxted line could not be upgraded for international trains. In May 1974, the BRB presented its plans for the high-speed link, with a cost estimate of £373 million (£3,500M in 2025). That November, the British government refused the BRB's proposal, and the plans for the tunnel were cancelled in January 1975.

=== 1980s and 1990s ===
The idea of constructing a fixed link between England and France was revived in the early 1980s. In March 1985, the British and French governments invited proposals from private consortia and, in January the following year, a twin-bore rail tunnel was chosen as the preferred option. The tunnel was to be built to the plans drawn up in the early 1970s, and the BRB was required to provide rolling stock and new infrastructure to connect it to the existing UK rail network. The board established a new sector, the European Passenger Services sector, to plan and operate the international passenger services.

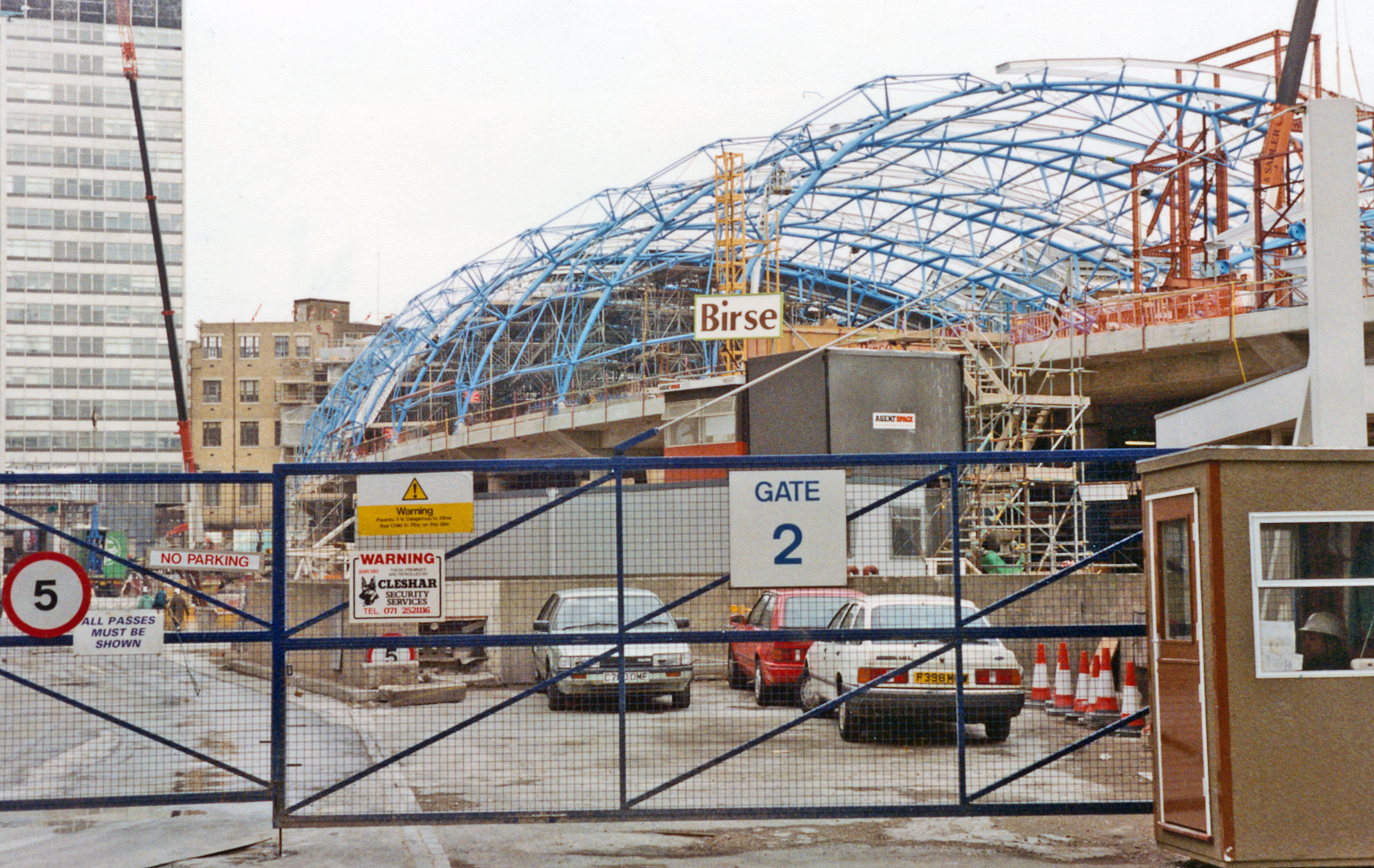
Waterloo International under construction in March 1992

The BRB's infrastructure works, some of which were focused on improving existing lines and stations on the Southern Region, were divided into two phases. Phase I included the construction of Waterloo International station, the resignalling of the South Eastern Main Line between Chislehurst and Folkestone, and the electrification of the Redhill–Tonbridge line to provide an alternative route for freight trains to reach the West London line. Phase II included the reconstruction of Ashford station, to create a new passenger rail terminal. The Channel Tunnel opened in May 1994, shortly after the formal abolition of the Southern Region that March.

== Accidents ==
- Barnes rail crash, 2 December 1955: An electric passenger train collided with the rear of a goods train, killing 13 people. The accident occurred in thick fog and was caused by a signaller's error.
- Lewisham rail crash, 4 December 1957: Two passenger trains collided in thick fog near Lewisham, causing the deaths of 90 people. The collision resulted in damage to a supporting column of a railway bridge, which collapsed onto the wreckage below. The number of deaths is the third highest in a British railway accident.
- Eastbourne rail crash, 25 August 1958: A steam-hauled sleeper train collided with an electric passenger train after passing a signal at danger. Five people were killed.
- Hither Green rail crash, 5 November 1967: A passenger train from Hastings to London Charing Cross was derailed by a track defect near Hither Green station. 49 people were killed.
- Eltham Well Hall rail crash, 11 June 1972: A passenger train travelling at around 65 miles per hour (105 km/h) derailed on a curve with a maximum permitted speed of 20 miles per hour (32 km/h). Six people were killed.
- Clapham Junction rail crash, 12 December 1988: A passenger train ran into the rear of a second train south of Clapham Junction, after faulty wiring caused a signal to display an incorrect proceed aspect. A third train collided with the wreckage. The accident occurred shortly after 8 am on a weekday morning and 35 people were killed.
- Purley Station rail crash, 4 March 1989: Two passenger trains, both travelling to London Victoria, collided north of Purley station. Part of the rear train fell down the embankment, killing five people.

== Bibliography ==
- Atthill, Robin (1970) [1967]. The Somerset & Dorset Railway. London: Pan Books. ISBN 978-0-33-002478-5.
- Baker, Michael H. C. (1993). The Southern Electric Story. Peterborough: Silver Link Publishing. ISBN 978-0-94-797185-4.
- Beecroft, Geoffrey (1986). The Hastings Diesels Story. Chessington: Southern Electric Group. ISBN 978-0-90-698820-6.
- Bird, John H. (1997). Southern Steam Sunset. Cheltenham: Runpast Publishing. ISBN 978-1-87-075442-2.
- Body, Geoffrey (1989) [1984]. Railways of the Southern Region. Wellingborough: Patrick Stephens Ltd. ISBN 978-1-85-260297-0.
- Bonavia, Michael R. (1981). British Rail: The First 25 Years. Newton Abbot: David & Charles. ISBN 978-0-71-538002-4.
- Bonavia, Michael R. (1987a). The History of the Southern Railway. London: Unwin Hyman. ISBN 978-0-04-385107-4.
- Bonavia, Michael R. (1987b). The Channel Tunnel Story. Newton Abbot: David & Charles. ISBN 978-0-71-538964-5.
- Brown, David; Jackson, Alan A. (1990). Network SouthEast Handbook. Harrow Weald: Capital Transport Publishing. ISBN 978-1-85-414129-3.
- Brown, David (2009). Development of the London Suburban Network and Its Trains. Southern Electric. Vol. 1. Crowthorne: Capital Transport Publishing. ISBN 978-1-85-414330-3.
- Brown, David (2010). Main Line Electrification, the War Years and British Railways. Southern Electric. Vol. 2. Crowthorne: Capital Transport Publishing. ISBN 978-1-85-414340-2.
- Butt, R. V. J. (1995). The Directory of Railway Stations. Yeovil: Patrick Stephens Ltd. ISBN 978-1-85-260508-7.
- Cooper, B. K.; Antell, Robert (1988). A Tribute to the London & South Western Railway. London: Ian Allan. ISBN 978-0-71-101780-1.
- Freeman Allen, Geoffrey (1987). The Southern Since 1948. Shepperton: Ian Allan Ltd. ISBN 978-0-71-101677-4.
- Gould, David (2003). The Croydon, Oxted & East Grinstead Railway. Usk: Oakwood Press. ISBN 978-0-85-361598-9.
- Gourvish, Terrence R. (1986). British Railways, 1948–73: A Business History. Cambridge: Cambridge University Press. ISBN 978-0-52-118883-8.
- Gourvish, Terrence R. (2002). British Rail, 1974–97 : From Integration to Privatisation. Oxford: Oxford University Press. ISBN 978-0-19-925005-9.
- Green, Chris; Vincent, Mike (2014). The Network SouthEast Story. Hersham: Ian Allan Ltd. ISBN 978-0-86-093653-4.
- Glover, John (2001). Southern Electric. Hersham: Ian Allan Ltd. ISBN 978-0-71-102807-4.
- Hardy, Brian (2003). Tube Trains on the Isle of Wight. Harrow Weald: Capital Transport. ISBN 978-1-85-414276-4.
- Holland, Harry (1971). Travellers' Architecture. London: Harrap. ISBN 978-0-24-559068-9.
- Hymans, Michael (2017). Southern Rail Through the 1950s: Year by Year. Stroud: Amberley Books. ISBN 978-1-44-566619-8.
- Jackson, Alan A. (1984) [1969]. London's Termini. London: David & Charles. ISBN 978-0-33-002747-2.
- Jackson, Alan A. (1999). The Railway in Surrey. Penryn: Atlantic Transport Publishers. ISBN 978-0-90-689990-8.
- Jackson, Tanya (2014). British Rail: The Nation's Railway. Stroud: The History Press. ISBN 978-0-75-096076-2.
- Kidner, R. W. (1985). Southern Railway Halts. Headington: The Oakwood Press. ISBN 978-0-85-361321-3.
- Lawrence, Mark (1994). Network SouthEast: From Sectorisation to Privatisation. Yeovil: Oxford Publishing. ISBN 978-0-86-093494-3.
- Mitchell, Vic; Smith, Keith (1988). Reading to Guildford. Midhurst: Middleton Press. ISBN 978-0-90-652047-5.
- Mitchell, Vic; Smith, Keith (1989). Branch Lines around Ascot. Midhurst: Middleton Press. ISBN 978-0-90-652064-2.
- Moody, George T. (1979) [1968]. Southern Electric 1909–1979 (5th ed.). London: Ian Allan Ltd. ISBN 978-0-71-100924-0.
- Oppitz, Leslie (1987). Sussex Railways Remembered. Newbury: Countryside Books. ISBN 978-0-90-539299-8.
- Oppitz, Leslie (1988). Kent Railways Remembered. Newbury: Countryside Books. ISBN 978-1-85-306016-8.
- Oppitz, Leslie (1989). Dorset Railways Remembered. Newbury: Countryside Books. ISBN 978-1-85-306042-7.
- Pomeroy, Colin A. (1991). Isle of Wight Railways. Peterborough: Silver Link Publishing. ISBN 978-0-94-797162-5.
- Robertson, Kevin; Oppitz, Leslie (1988). Hampshire Railways Remembered. Newbury: Countryside Books. ISBN 978-0-90-539293-6.
- Robertson, Kevin (2009). Southern Region. The Changing Railway Scene. Hersham: Ian Allan Ltd. ISBN 978-0-71-103380-1.
- Robertson, Kevin; Abbinnett, Hugh (2012). Southern Region DEMUs. Hersham: Ian Allan. ISBN 978-0-71-103511-9.
- Smith, Paul; Salmon, Sally (2019). Directory of British Railways: New and Reopened Stations. Barnsley: Pen and Sword. ISBN 978-1-52-670430-6.
- Thomas, David St John; Whitehouse, Patrick (1988). A Century and a Half of SR150: The Southern Railway. Newton Abbot: David & Charles. ISBN 978-0-71-539148-8.
- Welch, Michael (2003). A Southern Electric Album. Crowthorne: Capital Transport. ISBN 978-1-85-414270-2.
- Welch, Michael (2005). Southern DEMUs. Harrow: Capital Transport. ISBN 978-1-85-414287-0.
- White, H. P. (1992) [1961]. Southern England. A Regional History of the Railways of Great Britain. Vol. 2. Nairn: David St John Thomas. ISBN 978-0-94-653777-8.
