= Westenhanger railway station =

Railway station in Kent, England

Coordinates: 51.095°N 1.038°E

Westenhanger
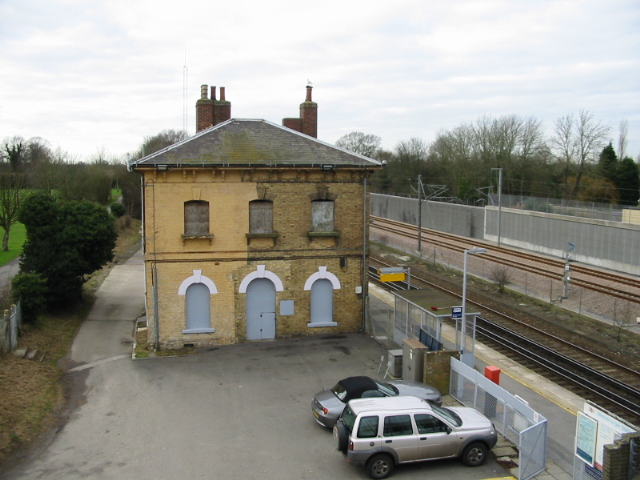

General information
- Location: Westenhanger, Folkestone & Hythe; England
- Grid reference: TR128372
- Manager: Southeastern
- Platforms: 2

Other information
- Station code: WHA
- Classification: DfT category F1

History
- Opened: 7 February 1844

Passengers
- 2020/21: ▼18,902
- 2021/22: ▲45,092
- 2022/23: ▲54,372
- 2023/24: ▲61,216
- 2024/25: ▲62,914
Location
Notes
- Passenger statistics from the Office of Rail and Road

Westenhanger railway station is on the South Eastern Main Line in England, serving the villages of Westenhanger and Stanford, and was near the now-closed Folkestone Racecourse, in Kent. It is 64 miles 15 chains (103.3 km) down the line from London Charing Cross. The station and all trains that call are operated by Southeastern.

== History ==
The station was built by the South Eastern Railway (SER). The line through the station opened on 28 June 1843, before construction had started. It was announced on 28 November 1843 and was planned to be the station serving Hythe; the SER Chairman Joseph Baxendale hoped to stand as a candidate in the next general election for that constituency. It opened on 7 February 1844 along with the extension from Folkestone Central to Dover Priory. An inn was built next to the station in September.

The station became a junction when the SER's branch line to Sandgate opened on 10 October 1864. However, it was inconveniently placed, and the SER considered closing it and building a station somewhere else. Ultimately, the station was not closed and Sandling railway station opened.

British Rail proposed the closure of the station as from 3 February 1969. Objections were made which were considered by a Transport Users' Consultative Committee, after which the Minister of Transport decided against closure.

In 2017, Shepway District Council announced plans to build a garden town next to the station, with around 12,000 new homes.

Plans for the Otterpool garden town were approved by Folkestone and Hythe District Council in April 2023.

== Racecourse station ==
In 1898, a station about 250 metres west of Westenhanger was built to serve the adjacent Folkestone Racecourse. It was only used on race days. It closed in the 1960s.1976 As at 2026, the majority of the disused platforms were still in situ.

== Facilities ==
The station is unstaffed and facilities are limited.

There is a self-service ticket machine at the station entrance and passenger help points located on each of the platforms. There is also a small (free) car park at the station entrance.

The station has step-free access available to the London bound platform although the Dover bound platform can only be reached via the footbridge meaning step-free access is not possible.

== Services ==
All services at Westenhanger are operated by Southeastern using Class 375 EMUs.

The typical off-peak service in trains per hour is:

- 1 tph to London Charing Cross via Tonbridge
- 1 tph to Dover Priory

Additional services, including trains to and from London Cannon Street and Ramsgate via Deal, and to London Victoria call at the station during the peak hours.

Preceding station	National Rail	Following station
Ashford International	Southeastern South Eastern Main Line	Sandling
	Disused railways	
Smeeth	British Rail Southern Region South Eastern Main Line	Sandling for Hythe
