= Sandgate Branch =

Former railway line in Kent, England

The Sandgate branch was a three mile long railway branch line that ran from Sandling railway station in Kent on the South Eastern Main Line to Hythe and Sandgate (located in Seabrook) railway stations. It opened in 1874 and closed completely in 1951.

== History ==
=== Opening ===
The line opened in 1874, and for the first few years trains ran to and from Westenhanger railway station on the main line, then in 1888 Sandling Junction opened with four platforms, two for the main line and two for the branch.

=== Traffic ===
Usage was always light, possibly because of the distance of the two stations from the populations they served. The Folkestone, Hythe and Sandgate Tramways was built to try improve connections.

=== Proposed extension ===
The line was planned to provide a new route to the continent with a proposed extension through to Folkestone Harbour. Although parliamentary consent for the extension was granted in 1876 it was never built.

=== Closure ===
In 1931 Sandgate station was closed and the remaining line between Sandling and Hythe singled. The line was closed briefly in 1943 to reopen in 1945 with two trains a day each way. The last train ran between Hythe and Sandling on 3 December 1951 and Sandling Junction was renamed Sandling for Hythe.

== The route today ==
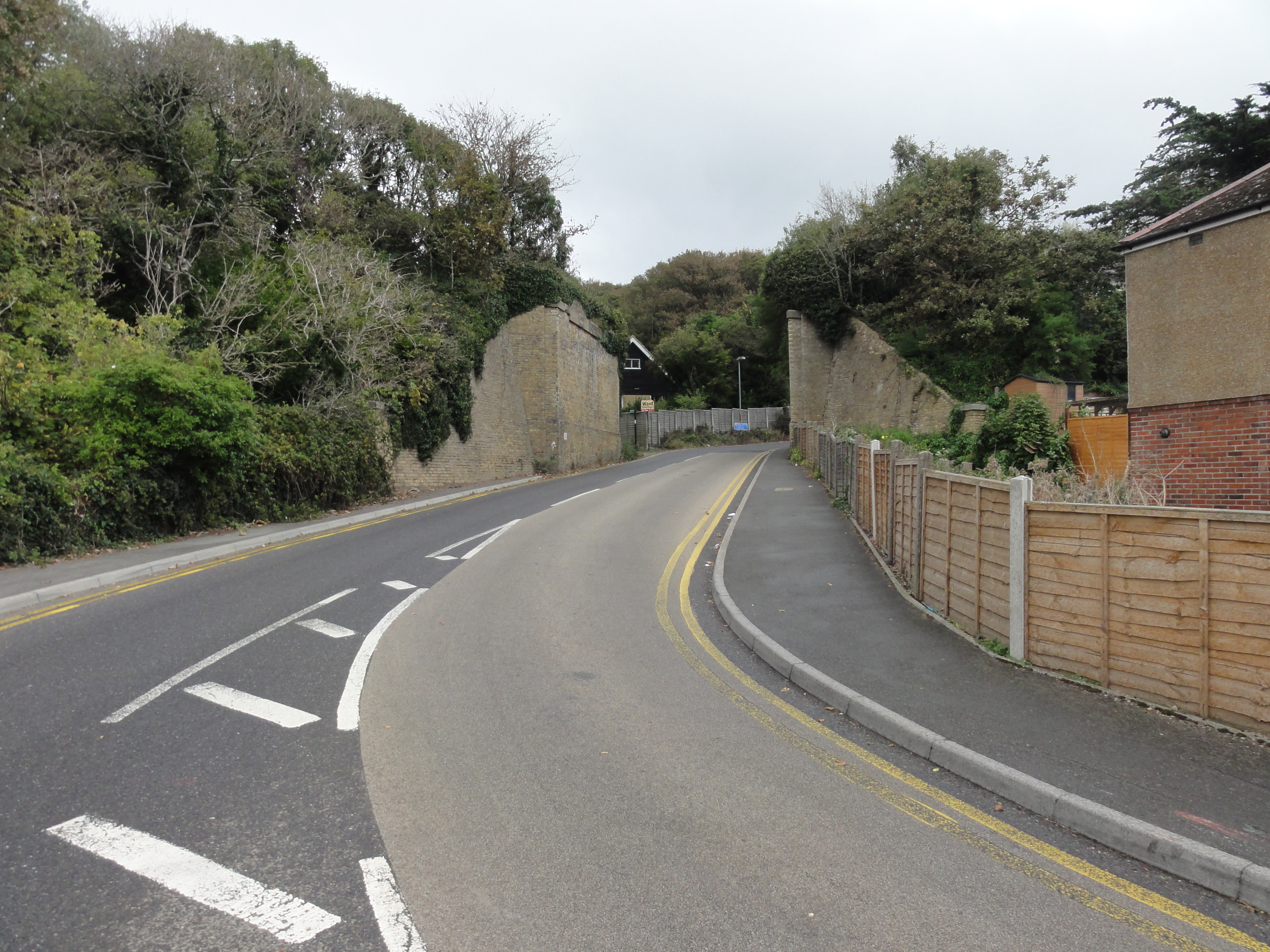
Bridge near Sandgate

As at 2012 the route from Sandling to Hayne Tunnel is now a public footpath (Elham Valley Way). Hayne Tunnel is still in situ but the tunnel is now flooded up to several feet deep because part of its cutting to the south of the tunnel has been partially in filled with refuse. At the site of Hythe Station and around Seabrook there are many houses built onto the old railway embankment. Between Hythe and Seabrook short sections of infrastructure were still visible (in 2012) including some bridges still in situ. Although the station name was Sandgate the station was located in Seabrook.
