= Smeeth railway station =

Disused railway station in Kent

Coordinates: 51.1077°N 0.9535°E

Smeeth
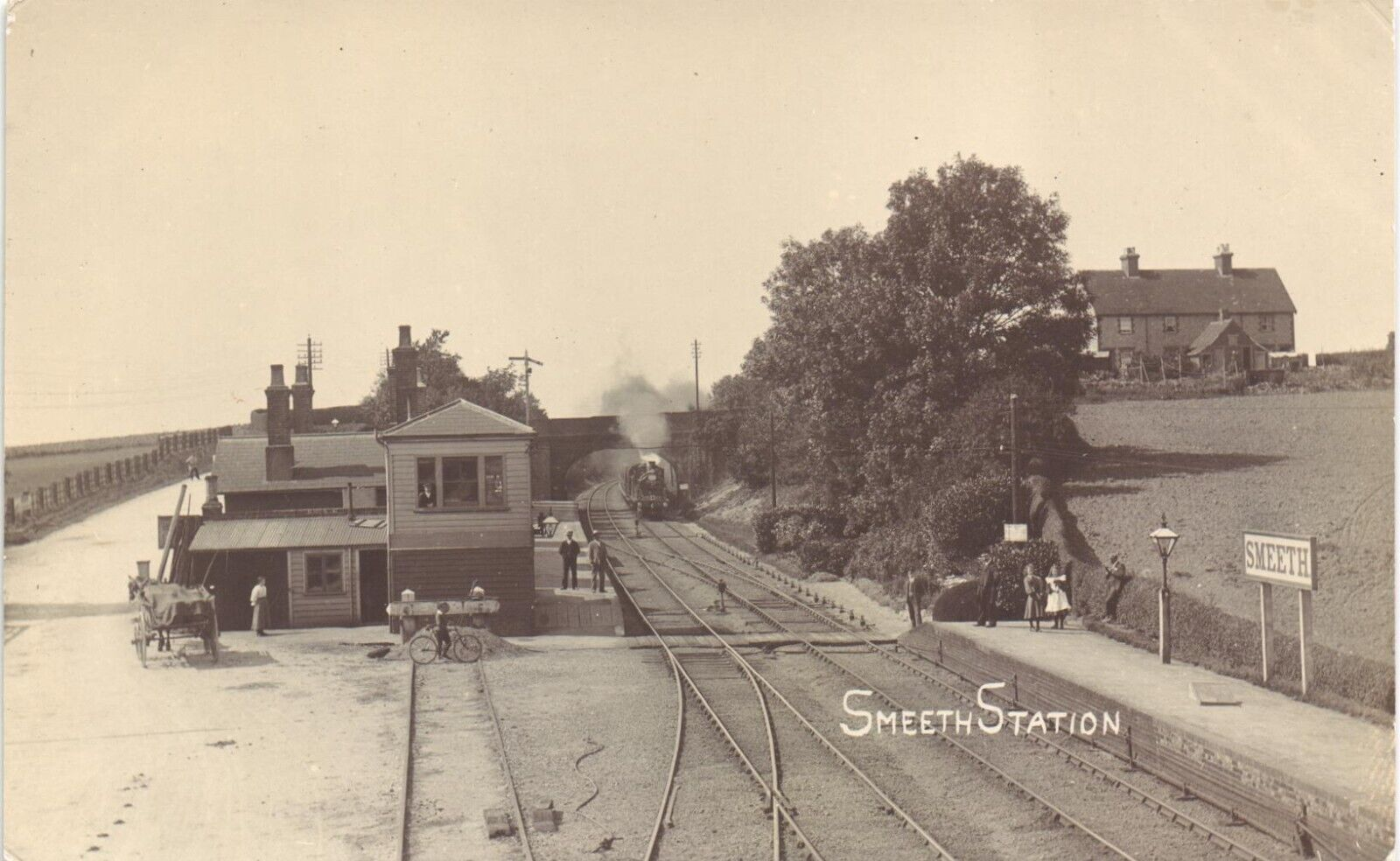

General information
- Location: Smeeth, Borough of Ashford; England
- Grid reference: TR067383
- Platforms: 2

Other information
- Status: Disused

History
- Pre-grouping: South Eastern Railway; South Eastern and Chatham Railway
- Post-grouping: Southern Railway; Southern Region of British Railways

Key dates
- October 1852: Opened
- 4 January 1954: Closed to passenger services
- 18 April 1964: Goods facilities withdrawn
Location

Smeeth is a disused railway station on the South Eastern Main Line which served the village of Smeeth in Kent, England. The station opened in 1852 and closed in 1954.

== History ==
Smeeth, a scattered village community of a few hundred persons in the early 1840s, was initially ignored by the South Eastern Railway (SER) when it constructed its mainline through the area to reach Folkestone. Situated 4.5 miles (7.2 km) from Ashford, the small village was primarily a farming community producing wheat, barley, oats, beans and peas; the grain was processed at Evegate Mill on the River Stour to the south of the railway line, which was the most substantial structure in the area. In 1850, six years after opening the South Eastern Main Line, a deputation of local tradesmen pressed the SER to open a station in the village, arguing that the potential goods traffic that could be generated would outweigh the lack of passenger receipts. Although there was little to suggest that Smeeth could justify and support a railway station, the SER agreed to the venture. A site was chosen 1 mile (1.6 km) to the south of the village at a point where the Bonnington to Smeeth road (now the B2069) crossed the railway line. The land was owned by the Knatchbull-Hugessen family, Sir Edward Knatchbull-Hugessen being the local Member of Parliament and, in later years, a director of the SER.

Rather than the usual wooden, clapboard structures favoured in the construction of SER stations, Smeeth's main station building was instead a substantial multi-gabled brick building. Other common SER features were to be found at this station, including two staggered platforms and a weather-boarded signal box situated on the upside together with the main station building. The down platform had the minimum of facilities: only a basic wooden waiting shelter and paraffin lamps on "barley-sugar" columns. In 1873, the station facilities were enlarged and the goods yard extended involving the laying of an extra siding, indicating a respectable level of goods traffic. Timetabling of services generally saw eight up and down trains call at Smeeth on weekdays: the first service (up) at 7.25 am, and the last service (down) at 9.25 pm.

Passenger traffic began to drop following the Second World War as bus services became more popular; the East Kent Road Car Company ran buses that passed close to Smeeth on their way between Ashford and Folkestone, drawing off much of the railway's custom. Nationalisation in 1947 saw the Southern Region of British Railways (BR) take over responsibility for the station, and it began to implement a new policy of centering goods traffic at larger railhead depots, thereby sounding the death knell for many wayside stations across the country whose income was largely down to goods traffic. In 1953, BR proposed the closure of Smeeth Station, arguing that it would save nearly £10,000 in wages and other expenses linked with the renewal of the two platforms; the station, it said, brought in £10,322 in goods receipts and only £143 would be lost from withdrawing passenger services. The local Member of Parliament, Bill Deedes, encouraged villagers to fight the closure, but the local newspaper noted that most preferred to travel by bus or motor car. The station's last passenger train, therefore, departed at 9.50 pm on Sunday 3 January 1954, leaving goods traffic to last for ten more years before Smeeth closed entirely.

The goods yard was let for commercial use after its closure on 18 April 1964, and the buildings were later demolished to leave no trace that a station had ever existed on the site.

Preceding station	Disused railways	Following station
Ashford	British Rail; Southern Region; South Eastern Main Line	Westenhanger
