= Seabrook Stream =

Protected area in Kent, England

Coordinates: 51.087°N 1.109°E

- Site of Special Scientific Interest
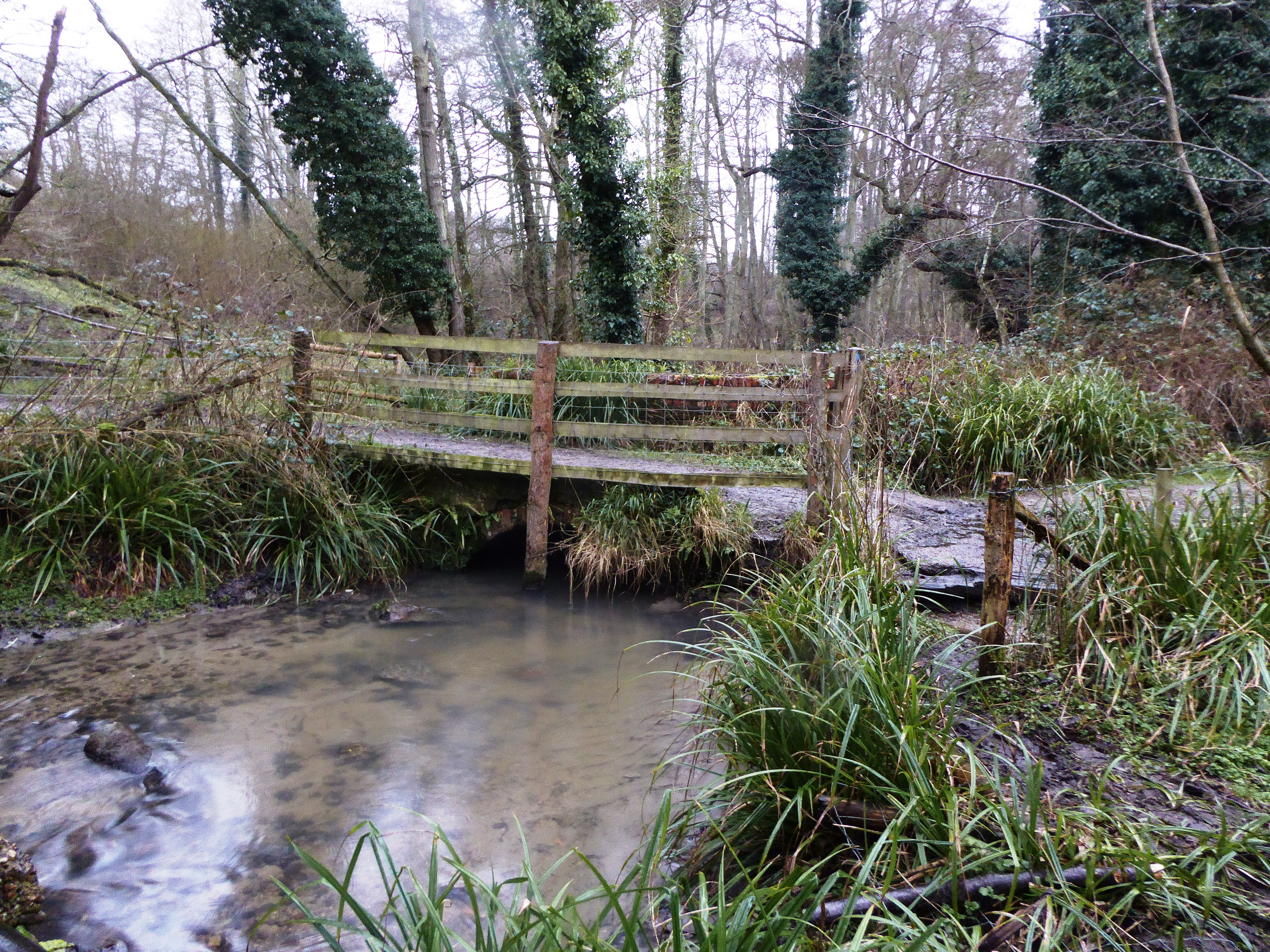
- Location of Seabrook Stream.
- Area of search: Kent
- Grid reference: TR 178 366
- Interest: Biological
- Area: 24.1 hectares (60 acres)
- Notification date: 1987
- Location map: Magic Map

Seabrook Stream is a 24.1-hectare (60-acre) biological Site of Special Scientific Interest in Kent.

The main biological interest of this site lies in the sixty-seven species of cranefly which have been recorded in areas of alder carr and fen. Four are nationally scarce, including erioptera limbata, which is only known on two other British sites, and there are also fourteen other nationally scarce invertebrate species.

A public footpath from Folkestone goes through the site, but much of it is private land with no public access.

The stream ultimately reaches the coast at Seabrook.
