= Sandgate railway station =

Disused railway station in Kent

Coordinates: 51.0724°N 1.1224°E

Sandgate (located in Seabrook)
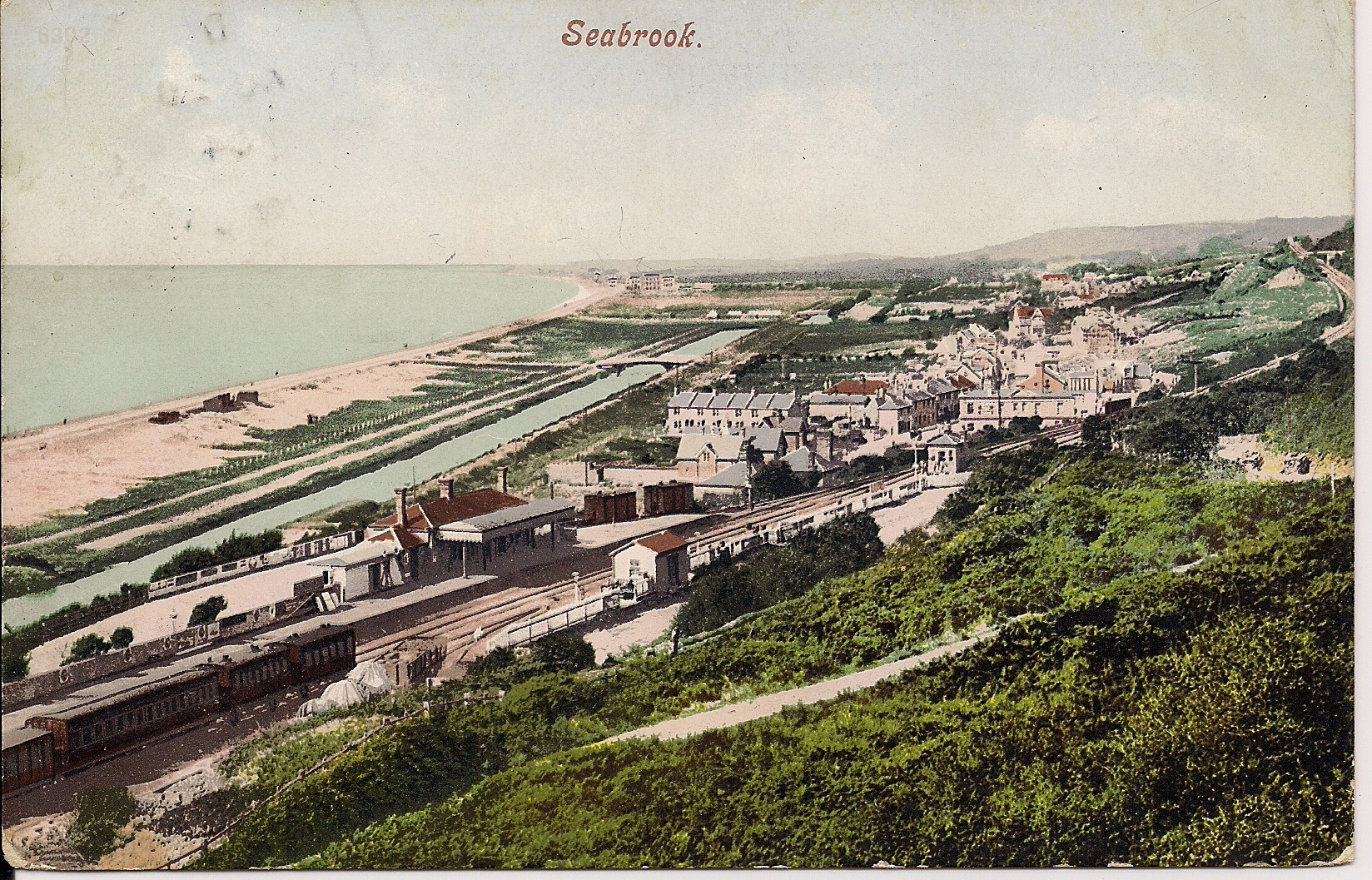

General information
- Location: Seabrook, Shepway; England
- Grid reference: TR1859534983
- Platforms: 2

Other information
- Status: Disused

History
- Pre-grouping: South Eastern Railway
- Post-grouping: Southern Railway (UK)

Key dates
- 9 October 1874: Station opens
- 1 April 1931: Station closes
Location

Sandgate railway station was a railway station on the Sandgate Branch line serving the town of Sandgate in Kent from the village of Seabrook. The station was positioned just after the railway crossed Hospital Hill and had two platforms and a brick built station building.

== History ==
The station was planned as part of the South Eastern Railway's attempt to connect the military base at Shorncliffe with the railway network. A secondary reason was to develop the village of Seabrook as a coastal holiday resort.

It was ceremonially opened on 9 October 1874, and opened fully the next day. An extension to Folkestone Harbour was planned, but this was never implemented. By 1910, the station was being served by 15 trains a day from Sandling, with the journey taking around 8 minutes.

Being inland of the town it served, the station was never popular and with increased bus traffic cutting the already small passenger numbers, it was closed on April Fool's Day 1931. The station building was demolished a few months after closure and a bus depot was built on the site which operated until 6 September 1980. The station area has since been completely redeveloped with housing.

Preceding station	Disused railways	Following station
Hythe; Line and station closed	Sandgate Branch	Terminus
