= Folkestone, Hythe and Sandgate Tramways =

Tramway operator in England

Operation
- Locale: Hythe, Kent
- Open: 18 May 1891
- Close: 30 Sep 1921
- Status: Closed

Infrastructure
- Track gauge: 1,435 mm (4 ft 8 1/2 in)
- Propulsion system: Horse
- Depots: Rampart Road, Hythe

Statistics
- Route length: 3.36 miles (5.41 km)

The Folkestone, Hythe and Sandgate Tramways operated a tramway service in Hythe, Kent between 1891 and 1921.

== History ==
Folkestone, Sandgate and Hythe Tramways Act 1884
- Act of Parliament
- Parliament of the United Kingdom
- Long title: An Act for making tramways in the county of Kent and for other purposes.
- Citation: 47 & 48 Vict. c. clxvi

Dates
- Royal assent: 28 July 1884

Text of statute as originally enacted

South-eastern Railway Act 1887
- Act of Parliament
- Parliament of the United Kingdom
- Long title: An Act for conferring further powers with reference to the South-eastern Railway Company's undertaking and the undertakings of other Companies and for other purposes.
- Citation: 50 & 51 Vict. c. cx

Dates
- Royal assent: 12 July 1887

Text of statute as originally enacted

The tramway was associated with the efforts to develop the properties of the Seabrook Estate Company and the Seabrook Hotel Company, both promotions of Sir Edward Watkin of the South Eastern Railway.

The Folkestone, Sandgate and Hythe Tramways Act 1884 (47 & 48 Vict. c. clxvi) authorised the construction of the line, and the South-eastern Railway Act 1887 (50 & 51 Vict. c. cx), passed on 12 July 1887, authorised the railway to guarantee the interest on the capital.

The first section to open was from Hythe railway station to Seabrook, Kent, to facilitate the construction of the Princes Road Parade and the sea wall designed by Sir John Goode for the Seabrook Estate Company.

Services started on 18 May 1891 from Sandgate School to the Seabrook Hotel. It was extended to the Red Lion Hotel, Hythe on 6 June 1892.

There were five tramcars and 25 horses. The service was half-hourly and the fare was 3d.

A storm between 10 and 14 February 1899 damaged the tramway on Sandgate seafront. A 60-foot (18 m) stretch of sea wall was breached opposite Wellington terrace.

Folkestone, Sandgate and Hythe Tramways Act 1906
- Act of Parliament
- Parliament of the United Kingdom
- Long title: An Act to incorporate the Folkestone Sandgate and Hythe Tramways Company and to empower that Company to make and maintain tramways and other works, and for other purposes.
- Citation: 6 Edw. 7. c. clxix

Dates
- Royal assent: 4 August 1906

An act of parliament, the Folkestone, Sandgate and Hythe Tramways Act 1906 (6 Edw. 7. c. clxix), on 4 August 1906 authorised the Folkestone, Hythe and Sandgate Tramways Company to take over the system from the South Eastern Railway.

== Closure ==
During the First World War the military commandeered the horses and services were suspended on 7 August 1914. It reopened after the war in the summer only, but services finally ended in 1921.
