= Sandgate, Kent =

Village in Kent, England

Coordinates: 51.074°N 1.1454°E

Sandgate
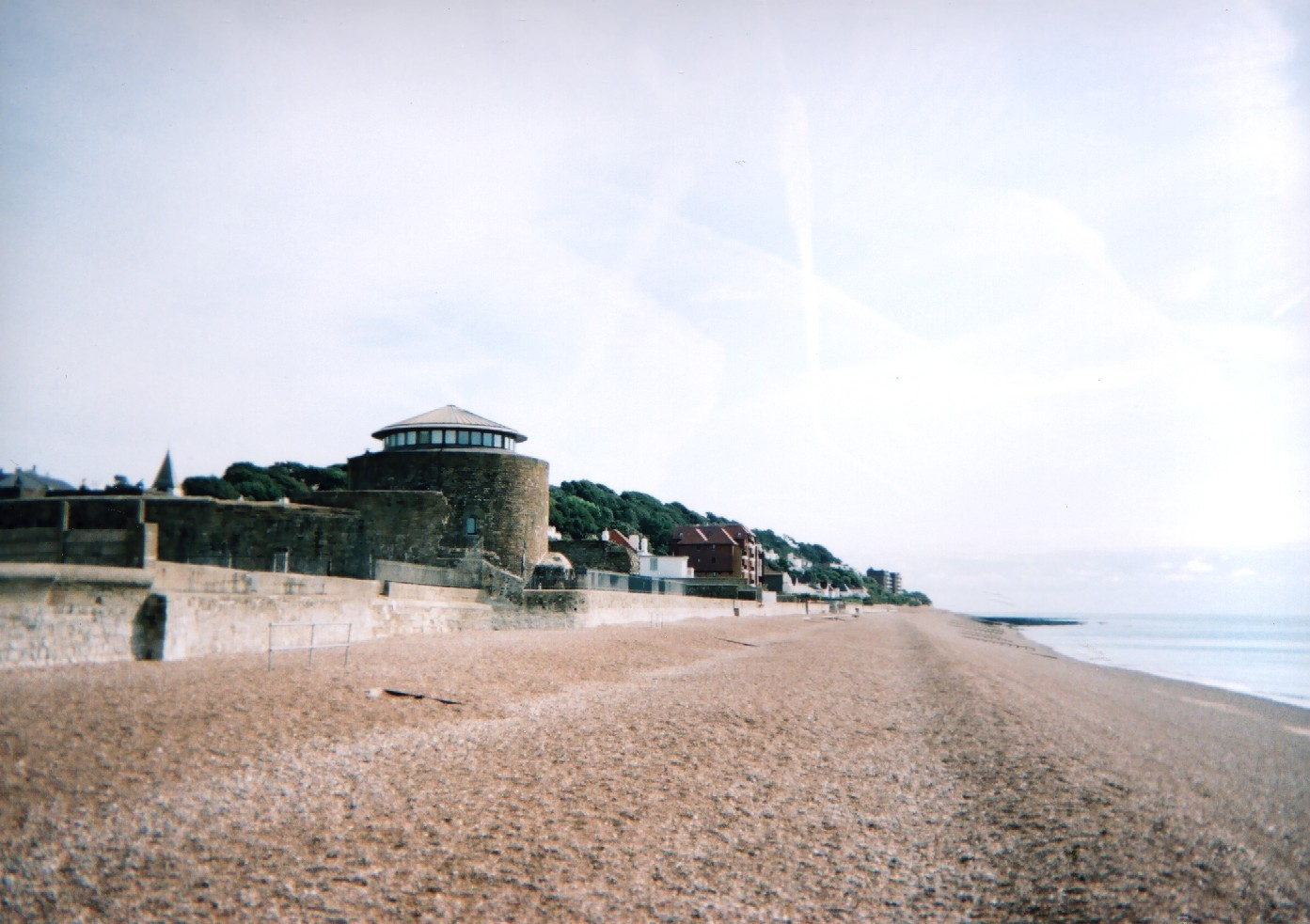
- Sandgate Castle

- Location within Kent
- Population: 4,639 (2011)
- OS grid reference: TR2035
- Civil parish: Sandgate
- District: Folkestone and Hythe
- Shire county: Kent
- Region: South East
- Country: England
- Sovereign state: United Kingdom
- Post town: FOLKESTONE
- Postcode district: CT20
- Dialling code: 01303
- Police: Kent
- Fire: Kent
- Ambulance: South East Coast
- UK Parliament: Folkestone and Hythe

Sandgate is a village in the Folkestone and Hythe Urban Area in the Folkestone and Hythe district of Kent, England. It had a population of 4,225 at the 2001 census. It is the site of Sandgate Castle, a Device Fort. H. G. Wells lived at Spade House, and it is also the birthplace of comedian Hattie Jacques. Sandgate is the location of the Shorncliffe Redoubt, a Napoleonic-era earthwork fort associated with Sir John Moore and the 95th Regiment of Foot, known as the 95th Rifles. St Paul's Church lies next to the Saga building, which is built on the site of Embrook House.

Sandgate was an urban district from 1894 to 1934 (having previously been part of Cheriton parish). It was added to Folkestone in 1934. In 2004, the village re-acquired civil parish status. The parish shares the boundaries of Folkestone Sandgate ward, at 2.17 km^{2} (0.84 sq mi).

The Sandgate Branch railway line was opened in 1874 and closed to passengers in 1951. Little of the infrastructure now remains, but it is still possible to see the remains of a tall overbridge at the bottom of Hospital Hill where the station was located in Seabrook.

The fourteen-room Sandgate Hotel appeared on the Channel 4 programme Ramsay's Kitchen Nightmares on 27 February 2006. It closed in 2022 and was put on the market in 2025. Other pubs include The Ship Inn, The Providence Inne, The Clarendon Inn and The Royal Norfolk Hotel. The Brisbane suburb with the same name is named after the town. There is also a Brisbane suburb called Shorncliffe, which is adjacent to Sandgate.

== Sister cities ==
- Sangatte, France

== Notable people ==
- Charles Daniel-Tyssen (1856–1940), cricketer and clergyman
- Hattie Jacques (1922–1980), comedy actress
