= Seabrook, Kent =

Coastal village in Hythe civil parish, Folkestone and Hythe District, Kent, England

Coordinates: 51.081°N 0.998°E

Seabrook
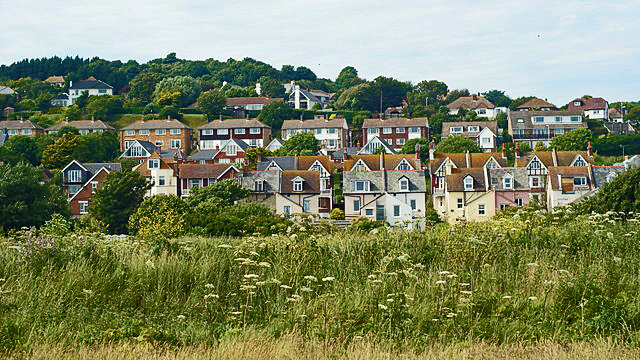
- Houses at Seabrook in 2009

- Location within Kent
- Population: 2,500
- OS grid reference: TR1859534983
- Civil parish: Hythe
- District: Folkestone and Hythe
- Shire county: Kent
- Region: South East
- Country: England
- Sovereign state: United Kingdom
- Post town: HYTHE
- Postcode district: CT21
- Dialling code: 01303
- Police: Kent
- Fire: Kent
- Ambulance: South East Coast
- UK Parliament: Folkestone and Hythe

Seabrook is a coastal village in the civil parish of Hythe, in the Folkestone and Hythe district of Kent, England, lying on the coast of the English Channel between Sandgate and Hythe. There is a Church of England Primary School. The village sits at the mouth of the Seabrook Stream and is a popular area for seaside walks, watersports and local community life. The historic start of the Royal Military Canal marks the western boundary of the settlement and the promenade between Seabrook and Hythe is a major attraction in summer months.

== History ==
Seabrook takes its name from the small stream that flows through the village into the English Channel, historically powering local industry such as a combined paper and corn mill in the 18th century. The village’s coastal location gave it strategic significance during the Napoleonic Wars, with the nearby Martello Towers constructed as part of the United Kingdom’s defensive network. The Royal Military Canal, begun at Seabrook in 1804, was also a Napoleonic defensive engineering project designed to slow a potential invasion. The Sandgate Branch railway station was located in Seabrook until its closure in 1931. The horse drawn Folkestone, Hythe and Sandgate Tramways also ran through Seabrook until its closure in 1921.

== Geography ==
Seabrook lies on a narrow coastal plain bounded to the north by the rising chalk slopes of the North Downs and to the south by the English Channel. The Seabrook Stream flows through the settlement, down the valley into the sea, contributing to the rich range of coastal and wetland habitats in the area. The King Charles III England Coast Path runs through Seabrook’s promenade, providing public access along the shoreline.

== Landmarks and natural features ==
- Royal Military Canal – This historic defensive canal begins at Seabrook and runs for several miles inland. It’s now a popular route for walking and cycling.
- Martello Tower – Local Napoleonic-era fortification typical of defensive structures found along the south coast.
- Seabrook Stream – The village’s namesake watercourse and important ecological feature.
- Seabrook Nature Reserve – A small patch of land between the sea and the Royal Military canal.
- Seabrook Beach – A quieter coastal stretch with views across the bay and long beach promenades suited for walking and swimming.
- Shorncliffe Battery – A late 18th to early 19th century artillery battery.

== Transport ==
Seabrook lies close to the A259 coastal road, with local bus services connecting to Hythe, Folkestone and surrounding villages. The nearest major rail service is at Folkestone Central railway station and Folkestone West railway station, offering links to London and other parts of Kent. Local walking routes connect Seabrook with neighbouring Sandgate and Hythe.

== Notable residents ==
- Bombardier Billy Wells (1889–1967), British heavyweight boxing champion and actor, best known as the iconic “gongman” for the Rank Organisation film logo. Wells lived in Seabrook during his later life and became a well-known local figure.

== See also ==
- Davina the Dolphin (formerly Dave) was often sighted off Seabrook in 2006–7.
