= Hythe railway station (South Eastern Railway) =

Disused railway station in Kent

Coordinates: 51.0765°N 1.0938°E

Hythe

General information
- Location: Hythe, Folkestone and Hythe; England
- Grid reference: TR167353
- Platforms: 2 (one used after 1931)

Other information
- Status: Disused

History
- Pre-grouping: South Eastern Railway
- Post-grouping: Southern Railway (UK)

Key dates
- 9 October 1874: Station opens
- 3 May 1943: station closes
- 1 October 1945: station opens
- 3 December 1951: Station closes
Location

Hythe railway station was a railway station serving the town of Hythe in Kent and was positioned just after the railway crossed Blackhouse Hill. On the Sandgate Branch line the station had two platforms, and a brick built station building.

It was ceremonially opened on 9 October 1874, and opened fully the next day. Being inland of the town it served the station was never popular. Following the closure of the section to Sandgate station in 1931 the line to Sandling Junction was reduced to single track. Hythe closed in 1943 during the Second World War but was reopened in 1945. Hythe station was closed along with the line in 1951.

The station area has been completely redeveloped for housing.

Preceding station	Disused railways	Following station
Sandling Junction; Line closed, station open	Sandgate Branch	Sandgate; Line and station closed
