= Folkestone Town Hall =

Municipal building in Folkestone, Kent, England

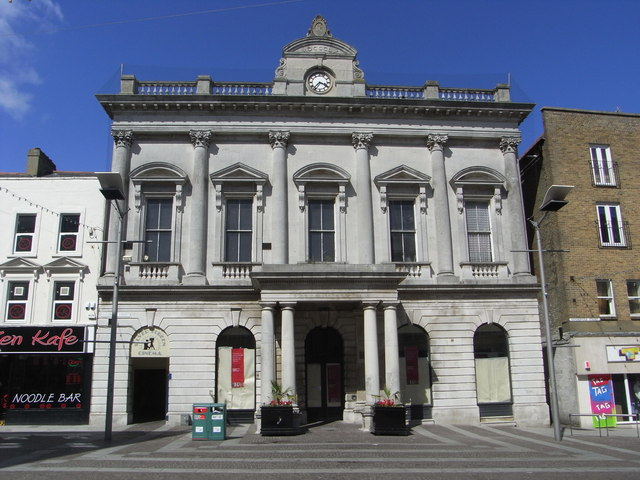
- Folkestone Town Hall

- Shown in Kent
- 51.0801°N 1.1810°E
- Location: Guildhall Street, Folkestone

History
- Built: 1861

Site notes
- Architect(s): Joseph Messenger and Messrs Whichford and Blandford
- Architectural style: Italianate style

Listed Building – Grade II
- Official name: The Guildhall
- Designated: 11 March 1975
- Reference no.: 1061218

Folkestone Town Hall, also known as The Guildhall, is a municipal building in Guildhall Street, Folkestone, Kent, England. The town hall serves as the headquarters of Folkestone Town Council, and also houses the Folkestone Museum. It is a Grade II listed building.

== History ==
The first guildhall in Folkestone, which was designed with arcading on the ground floor to allow markets to be held and with an assembly room on the first floor, was a medieval building erected on the corner of Church Street and Rendezvous Street which was rebuilt in the 17th century. It had its own lock-up for petty criminals After becoming dilapidated, the old guildhall was demolished in 1840. Civic leaders moved to a small crenelated building known as Cistern House which was leased from the Earl of Radnor. In the early 1850s civic leaders decided to demolish Cistern House and build a dedicated town hall on the same site.

The foundation stone for the new building was laid on 17 May 1859. It was designed by Joseph Messenger in the Italianate style and was built by John Edwards in Portland stone at a cost of £8,683. After the structural design was found to be inadequate in the context of an underground drain, Messenger resigned and Messrs Whichford and Blandford of Maidstone took over the design work. The building was officially opened by the mayor on 18 May 1861. The opening was celebrated with a concert which included a solo violin performance by H. Weist Hill of the Royal Italian Opera.

The design involved a symmetrical main frontage with five bays facing onto Guildhall Street; the ground floor was rusticated with five round headed openings with keystones while the first floor featured five sash windows with, alternately, curved and triangular pediments; the first floor windows were flanked by Corinthian order columns and at roof level there was a cornice with modillions. Internally, the principal room was the council chamber on the first floor.

An illuminated clock, manufactured by Gillett & Bland and given by Baron Mayer Amschel de Rothschild, was installed on 15 October 1861 and a porch with Tuscan order columns was added in 1879. The town hall was used as an air raid shelter during the latter years of the First World War and, in October 1934, it was the venue for the inquest into the deaths of the five of the seven people who had died in the Hillman's Airways de Havilland Dragon Rapide crash which had taken place in the English Channel earlier that month. It was then used as a military control centre during the Second World War.

The town hall continued to serve as the headquarters of Folkestone Borough Council for much of the 20th century but ceased to be the local seat of government when the borough council moved to a new civic centre on Castle Hill Avenue in 1966. The borough was abolished in 1974 and absorbed into the larger Shepway district, which was renamed Folkestone and Hythe District in 2018. A Folkestone Town Council was subsequently established as a lower-tier parish council in 2004.

The ground floor of the town hall was converted for retail use in the late 1980s and the first floor was converted for use as a cinema at the same time.

The building was acquired by Folkestone Town Council in June 2011. Following a programme of restoration works, which were undertaken to a design by Godden Allen Lawn, financed by the Heritage Lottery Fund and aimed at refurbishing the council chamber and creating space for the Folkestone Museum, the building re-opened in spring 2017. As well as housing the museum, the building serves as the offices and meeting place of the town council.

== Folkestone Museum ==
The museum, which was originally based around a collection of fossils belonging to Samuel Joseph Mackie, was initially established in temporary facilities in Tontine Street in the 1860s before moving into the new library at Grace Hill in 1888. The collection was enhanced during the course of the 20th century by the acquisition of various archaeological discoveries, by some paintings by Spanish and Italian masters and with some engravings by Albrecht Dürer, before it relocated to the town hall in spring 2017.
