= Folkestone Academy =

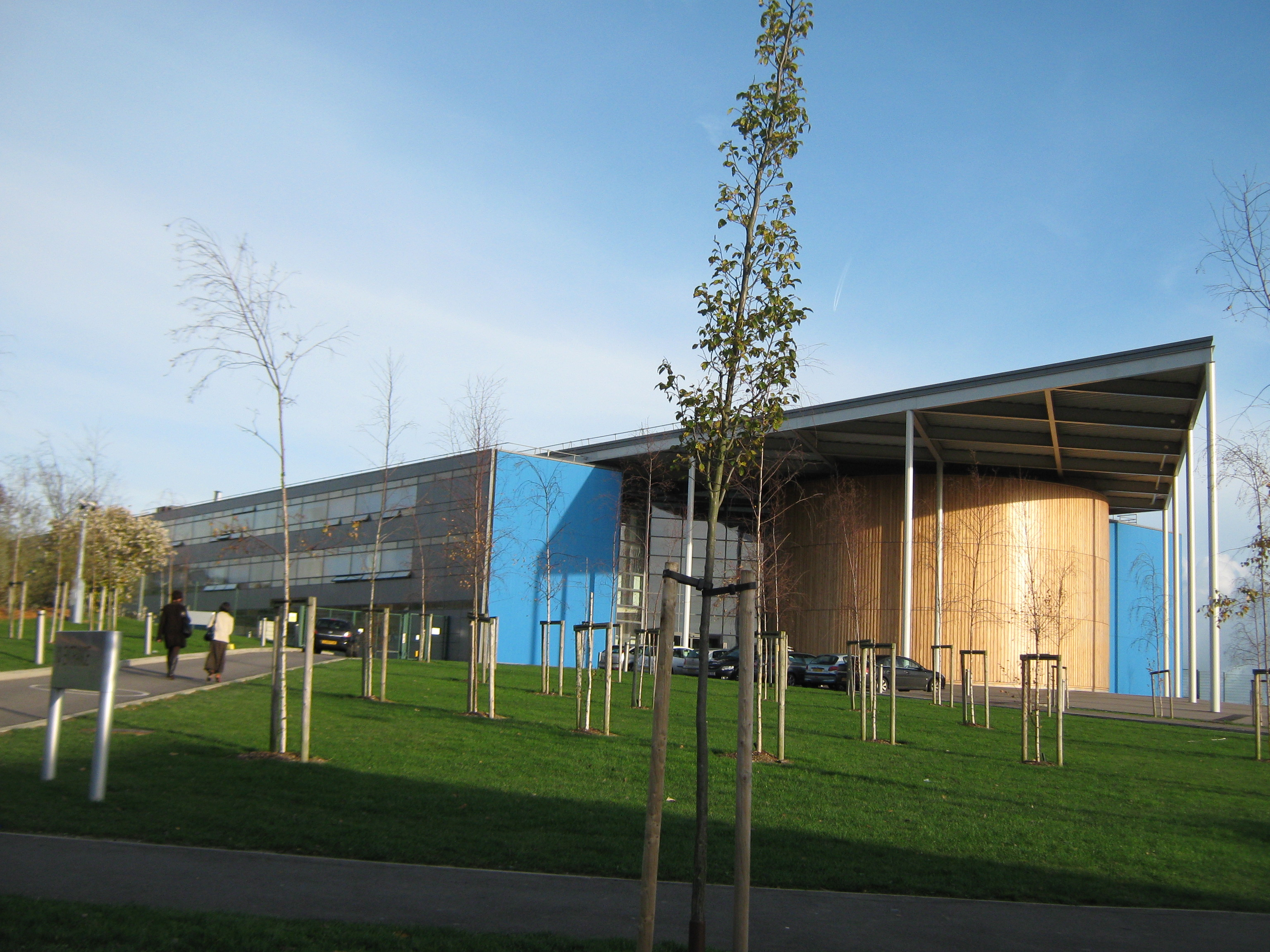

Location
- Academy Lane; Folkestone, Kent, CT19 5FP; England; 51°05′32″N 1°10′01″E

Information
- Former name: The Channel School
- Type: Academy
- Motto: Find your talent!
- Established: 2007
- Local authority: Kent County Council
- Trust: Turner Schools
- Department for Education URN: 145420 Tables
- Ofsted: Reports
- Principal: Ben Williams
- Staff: 50+
- Gender: Mixed
- Age range: 11–19
- Enrolment: 1,281 (2025)
- Capacity: 2,170
- Website: www.folkestoneacademy.com

Folkestone Academy is a mixed secondary school and sixth form with academy status in Folkestone, Kent, England that was established in September 2007. In April 2017, the school became a part of Turner Schools

== History ==
Initially opened in September 2007, the £40m purpose-built academy replaced the old town's Channel School in Folkestone. Operated under the principal Ben Williams, the school was built to encompass the education of many over the 18 years of operation in the deprived area.

Built as an all ages school (4-18), the school operated under the 'Folkestone Academy' name until joining the Turner Schools Trust in April 2017. In October 2013, a purpose made sixth form centre was built at The Glassworks, in Folkestone's Creative Quarter, close to the town centre. However, in 2021, the Folkestone Primary opened just after the Covid-19 lockdown, separating operations into a Primary Academy, Secondary Academy and Sixth Form.

In 2023, funding was secured in order to expand the academy, offering a new subject to be studied by KS3 individuals and at Level 1 qualification in KS4.

During 2024, the Folkestone Academy Sixth Form and Turner School Sixth Form merged to form T6 (Turner Sixth Form). This has led to a change in sixth form operations as individuals between the ages of 16 and 18 would begin to follow education in both academies.

The site originally contained the Wyndgate Secondary School after merging with Hillside School for Boys and Holywell School for Girls during the 1970s, eventually renamed to the Channel High School in the 1980s and the Channel School in the early-mid 1990s. However in late 2006 to be replaced with Folkestone Academy in 2007, opening in September 2007.

== Statistics ==
The school is the only school in the United Kingdom to have a skatepark on its premises, following being built in 2025 in order to increase activity in the sport.
