= Folkestone =

Town in Kent, England

Coordinates: 51°04′45″N 01°10′46″E

- Port town
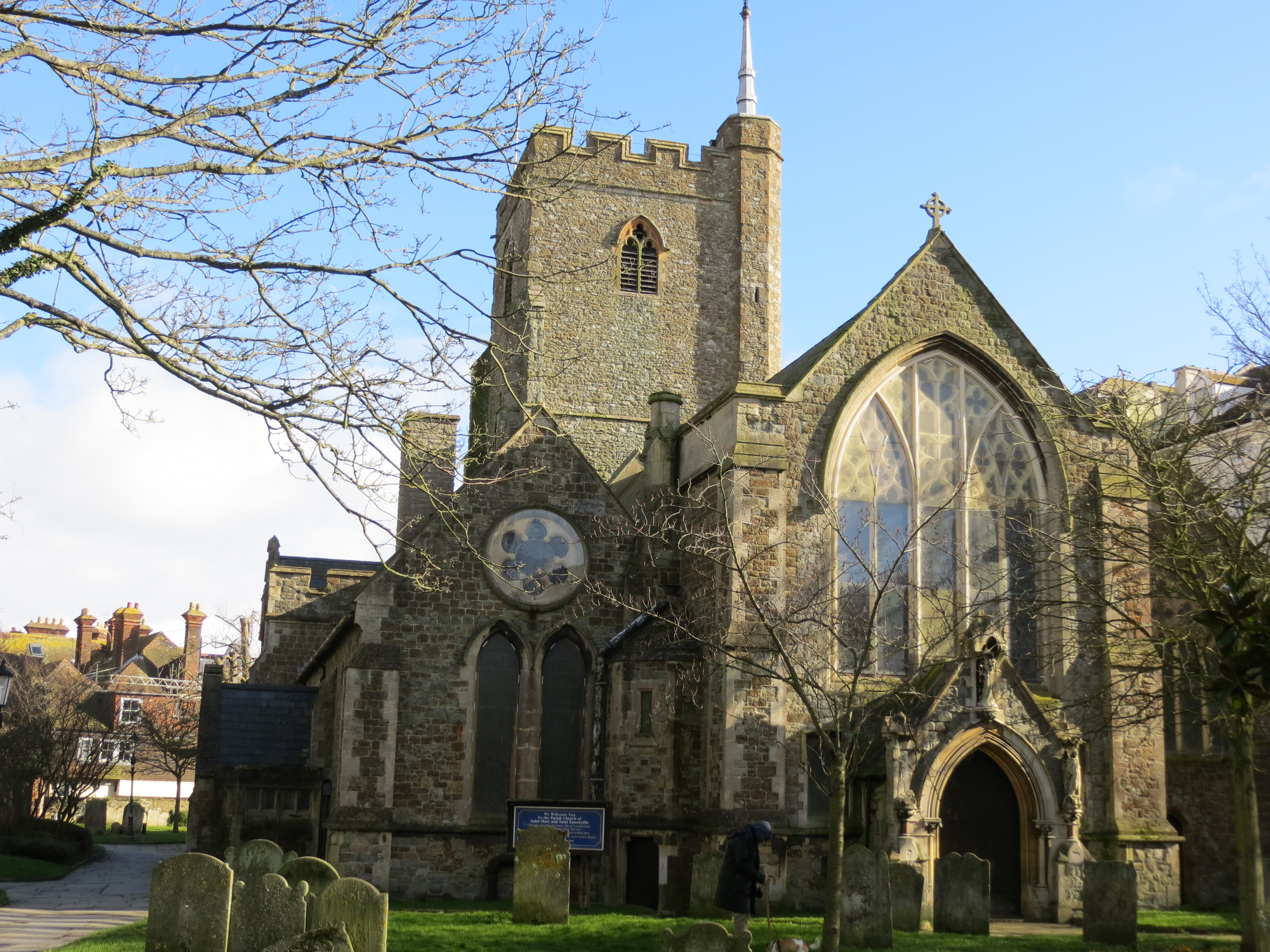
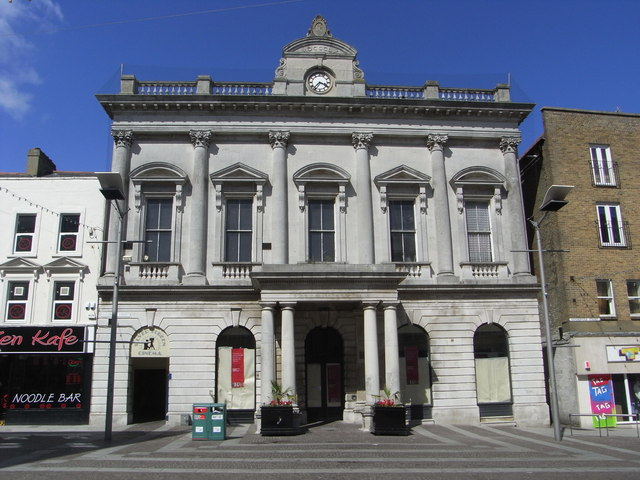
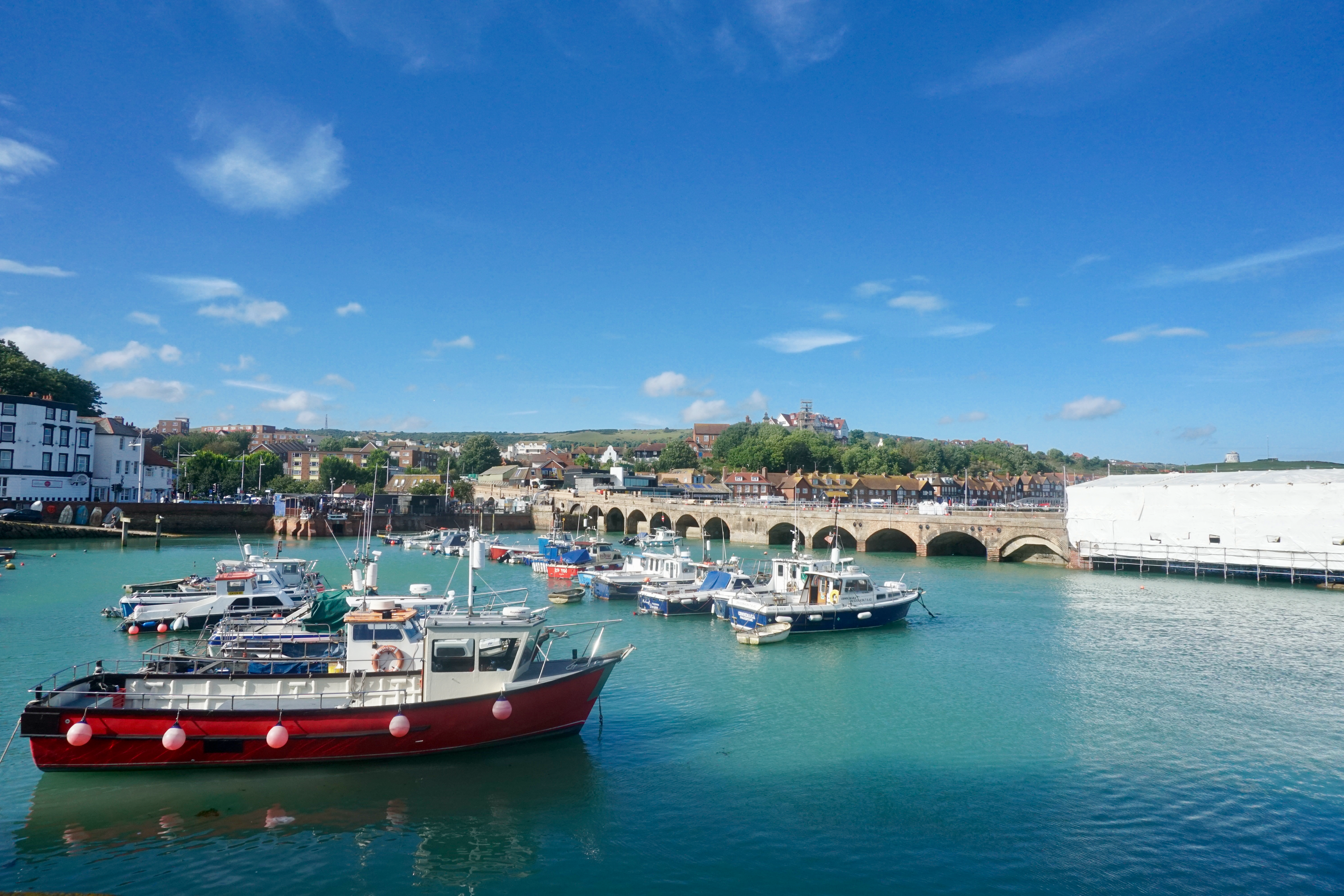
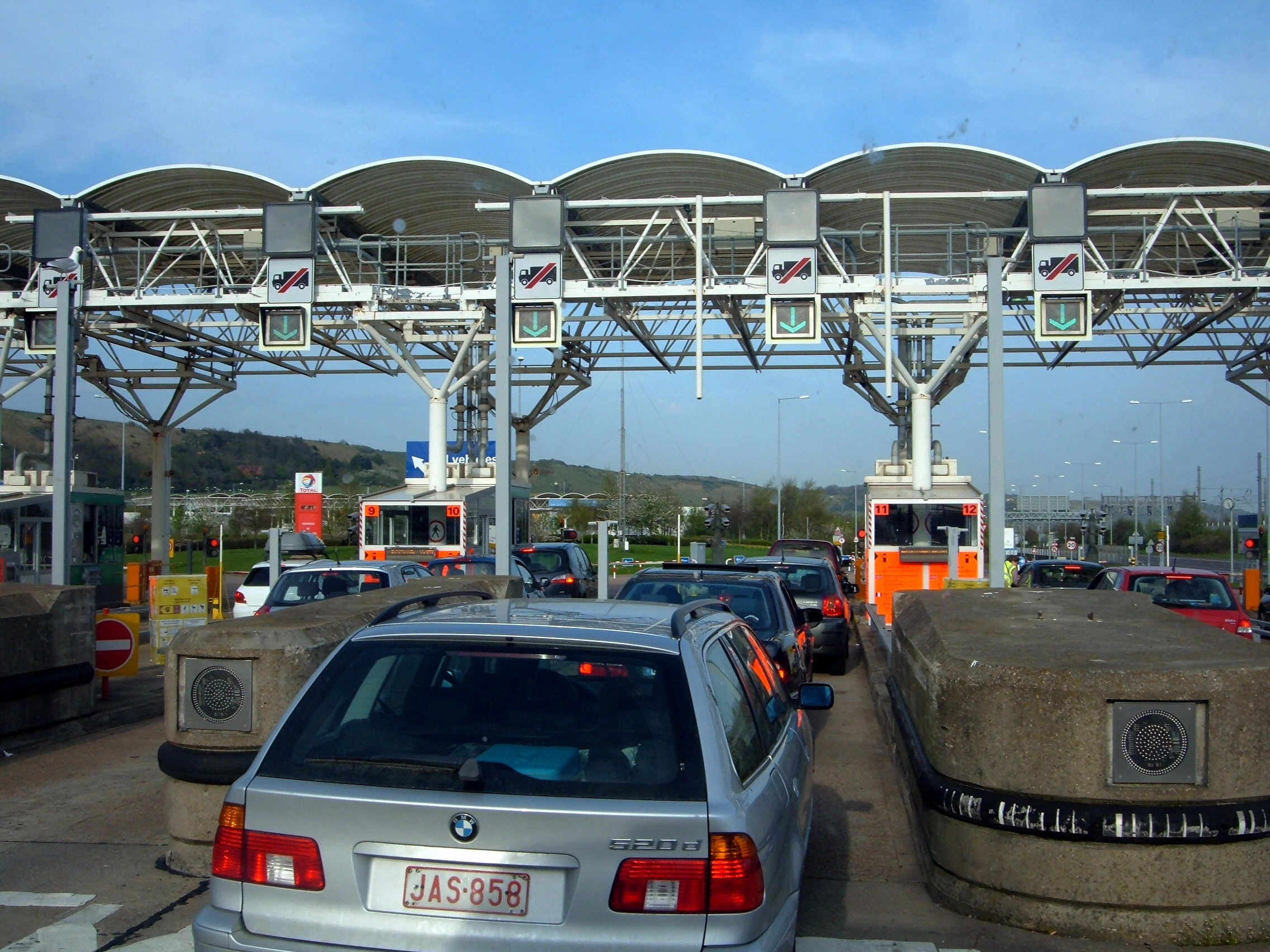
- St Mary's Church Town Hall The Harbour Eurotunnel

- Arms of Folkestone Town Council

- Location within Kent
- Population: 47,352 (2021)
- OS grid reference: TR218361
  - London: 71.3 mi (114.7 km)
- District: Folkestone and Hythe
- Shire county: Kent
- Region: South East
- Country: England
- Sovereign state: United Kingdom
- Post town: Folkestone
- Postcode district: CT18–CT20
- Dialling code: 01303
- Police: Kent
- Fire: Kent
- Ambulance: South East Coast
- UK Parliament: Folkestone and Hythe

Folkestone (/ˈfəʊkstən/ FOHK-stən) is a coastal town on the English Channel, in Kent, south-east England. The town lies on the southern edge of the North Downs at a valley between two cliffs. It was an important harbour, shipping port, and fashionable coastal resort for most of the 19th and mid-20th centuries.

This location has had a settlement since the Mesolithic era. A nunnery was founded by Eanswith, granddaughter of Æthelberht of Kent in the 7th century, who is still commemorated as part of the town's culture. During the 13th century, it developed into a seaport, and the harbour developed during the early 19th century to defend against a French invasion. Folkestone expanded further west after the arrival of the railway in 1843 as an elegant coastal resort, thanks to the investment of the Earl of Radnor under the urban plan of Decimus Burton.

In its Edwardian-era heyday, Folkestone was considered the most fashionable resort of the time, visited by royalty — amongst them Queen Victoria and Edward VII and other members of the English aristocracy. The town's architecture, especially in the West End part, is a testimony of this period, with many impressive buildings, townhouses, villas, private squares, and large hotels built to accommodate the gentry. After two world wars and the boom of the overseas holiday package, the town quickly declined. The harbour's trade diminished following the opening of the nearby Channel Tunnel and the ending of ferry services from Folkestone, but it still remains in active use.

== Toponymy ==
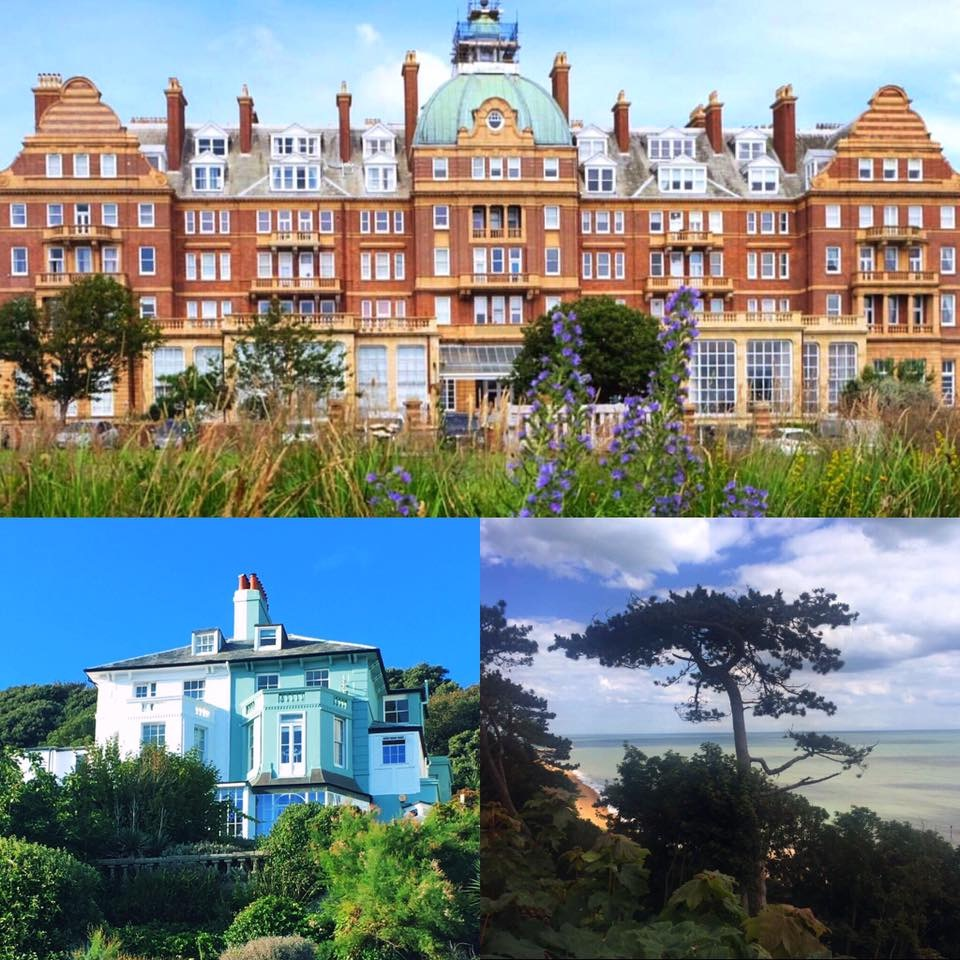
Views of Folkestone West End

Although Kent was the first part of the British mainland to be conquered and settled by the invading Angles, Saxons and Jutes from the middle of the 5th century AD, after the departure of the Romans, the name Folcanstan did not appear until the late 7th century. There is general agreement that this means Folca's stone, the stone possibly marking the meeting place of the local hundred. It was not until the mid-19th century that the spelling of "Folkestone" was fixed as such, with the Earl of Radnor requesting that the town's name be standardised (although this tendency towards standardisation in the 19th century is true of English place names generally). Folkestone is often misspelt with variants including Folkston, Folkstone & Folkeston.

== History ==
The area of Folkestone has been occupied since at least the Mesolithic era. In 2010, worked flints were discovered below the remains of the Folkestone Roman Villa. The East Cliff area was excavated in 1924 and most recently from 2010 to 2011, producing artefacts from the Mesolithic period through to the Roman era. On the East Cliff, an extensive Iron Age oppidum existed, which produced quern-stones on an almost industrial scale. Those quern-stones, which were used for grinding cereals into flour, were traded for continental exports such as pottery and wine. A modest Roman-style villa was constructed over the Iron Age settlement some time during the 1st century AD, followed by a more luxurious one in about 200 AD. The villa was abandoned during the 3rd or 4th century for unknown reasons.

In 597 AD, monks, led by Augustine of Canterbury, arrived at Ebbsfleet on the Isle of Thanet, on a mission from Pope Gregory to re-Christianise Britain. He was greeted by the Anglo-Saxon pagan King of Kent, Æthelberht, and his Christian Queen, Bertha. Augustine was granted land in Canterbury, where he built his church and, outside the walls, founded the monastery of St Peter & St Paul, now known as St Augustine's. Æthelberht was succeeded as Anglo-Saxon king of Kent by his son Eadbald, whose daughter Eanswythe refused all offers of marriage. In 630, Eanswythe founded a nunnery on the site of her father's castle near Folkestone by the present parish church of St Mary & St Eanswythe.

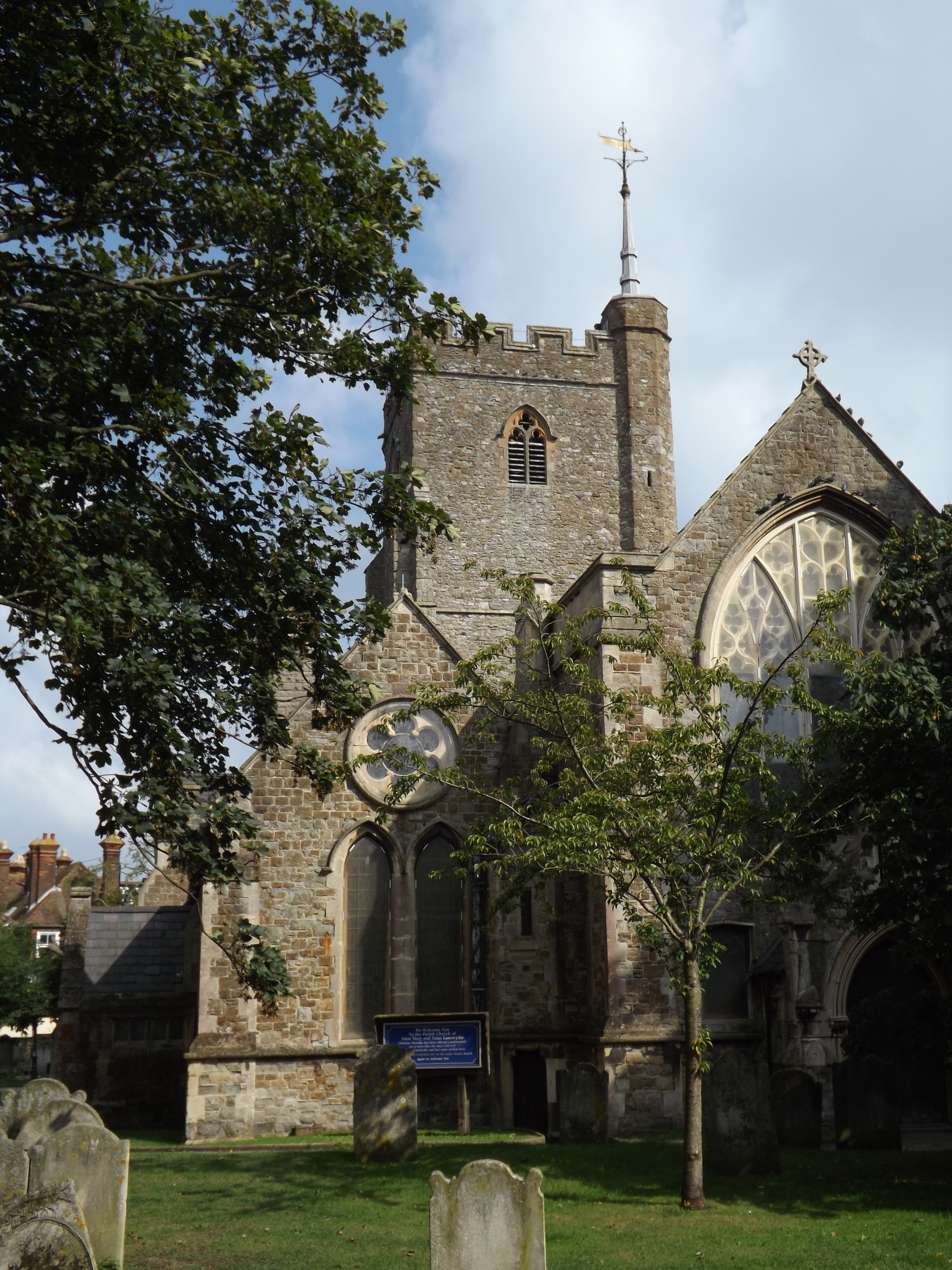
Church of St Mary and St Eanswythe, in the town centre, contains the remains of St Eanswythe, granddaughter of Æthelberht of Kent.

Eanswythe died around 640 and was quickly made a saint. Her remains were moved into the chancel of the current church on 12 September 1138, which has since been commemorated as the Feast of St Eanswythe. They became the focus of prayer and pilgrimage, so Eanswythe was quickly adopted as the town's patron. The religious community grew and developed into a monastery until it was dissolved by Henry VIII, and St Eanswythe's remains disappeared. They were rediscovered in June 1885 when workmen, carrying out alterations to the high altar, found a battered lead casket immured in a niche in the north wall of the chancel. Examination by archaeologists at the time, and again in 1981, confirmed that the casket was of Anglo-Saxon origin and the few bone fragments were those of a woman in her early thirties. The relics are still housed in the church, close to where they were discovered, flanked by a pair of small brass candlesticks. St Eanswythe also appears on the town's seal, along with William Harvey, the Folkestone-born 17th-century physician who discovered blood circulation.

A Norman knight held a Barony of Folkestone, which led to its entry as a part of the Cinque Ports in the thirteenth century and, with that, the privilege of being a wealthy trading port. At the start of the Tudor period, it had become a town in its own right. Wars with France meant that defences had to be built, and Folkestone Harbour was built, though the coming of the railways in 1843 had a greater impact on its development.

Dover Hill, the highest point in Folkestone, was a sighting point for the Anglo-French Survey (1784–1790), which measured the precise distance between the Royal Greenwich Observatory and the Paris Observatory. The hill provided a sight-line to the east along the line of the Folkestone Turnpike to Dover Castle, one of the two principal cross-channel observation points, the other being Fairlight Down in Sussex.

=== Folkestone Harbour ===
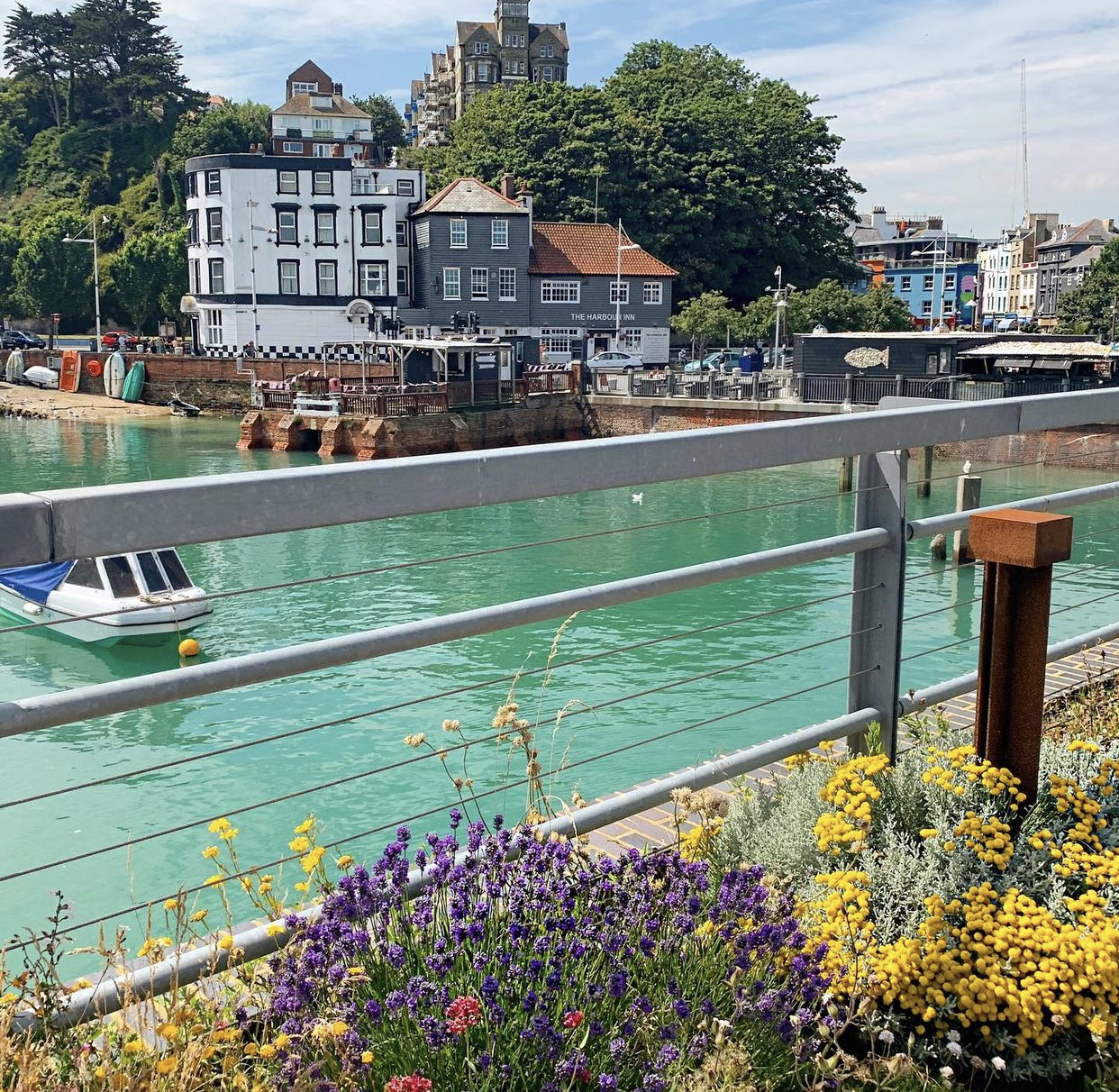
Folkestone Harbour

Until the 19th century, Folkestone remained a small fishing community with a seafront continually battered by storms and encroaching shingle, making it hard to land boats. In 1807, an act of Parliament, the Folkestone Pier and Harbour Act 1807 (47 Geo. 3 Sess. 2. c. ii), was passed to build a pier and harbour, which was built by Thomas Telford in 1809. By 1820 a harbour area of 14 acres (5.7 hectares) had been enclosed. Folkestone's trade and population grew slightly, but development was still hampered by sand and silt from the Pent Stream. The Folkestone Harbour Company invested heavily in removing the silt but with little success. 1842, the company went bankrupt, and the government put the derelict harbour up for sale. It was bought by the South Eastern Railway (SER), which was then building the London to Dover railway line. George Turnbull was responsible in 1844 for building the Horn pier. Dredging the harbour, and the construction of a rail route down to it, began almost immediately. The town soon became the SER's principal packet station for the Continental traffic to Boulogne. The last ferry ran in 2001.

The Harbour Arm, formerly used solely for port activities, has been extensively restored and developed as a recreational space and promenade to which the public has access, including bars and restaurants, with entertainment at weekends and on some evenings. The former railway station and harbour viaduct have been reconstructed as a successful public walkway and promenade following the full closure of the branch railway in 2014.

== Governance ==
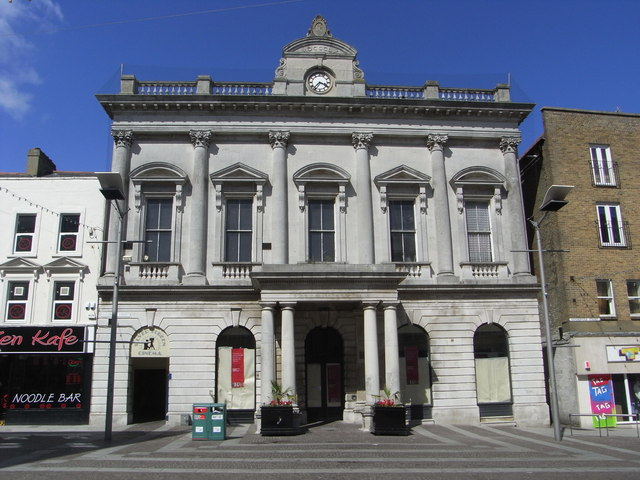
Folkestone Town Hall, completed in 1861

The governance of Folkestone lies in both national and local government. Insofar as the national government is concerned, Folkestone is part of the constituency of Folkestone and Hythe, which is currently (2024) represented by Tony Vaughan (Labour). Before Brexit in 2020, Folkestone was part of the South East England constituency in the European Parliament.

The local government consists of three tiers. In the first tier, Kent County Council, Folkestone is divided into two divisions each returning one county councillor. Folkestone West is represented by Dylan Jeffrey (Conservative). Folkestone East is represented by Jackie Meade (Labour).

The second tier of local government is the non-metropolitan district. Folkestone forms a part of Folkestone and Hythe district, which was first established by the Local Government Act 1972 as Shepway. Folkestone elects 10 of Folkestone and Hythe District Council's 30 councillors.

The third and lowest tier was established as the civil parish: in Folkestone's case, because it held a town charter, and when the then Folkestone Borough Council was abolished, councillors elected to represent Folkestone's wards were designated as the town's charter trustees, responsible for electing a town mayor. This role has since passed to Folkestone Town Council, a parish council which is based at Folkestone Town Hall.

Coat of arms of Arms of Folkestone Town Council

Notes
Granted to the borough council on 25 July 1958. Transferred to the successor parish council on 30 November 2007.
Crest
On a Wreath Or and Azure a demi double-headed Eagle displayed Sable beaked Or charged on the breast with a Rose Argent barbed and seeded proper dimidiated with a Fleur-de-Lys Gold and on each wing with a Ducal Coronet also Gold.
Escutcheon
Or on Water barry wavy in base proper an ancient Ship with four Men's Heads therein apparent as represented on the ancient Seal of the Borough of Folkestone also proper on a Chief per pale Gules and Azure a demi Lion passant guardant dimidiated with the Hull of a Ship Gold.
Supporters
On the dexter side, a figure representing St. Eanswyth proper crowned with an ancient Crown and holding in the exterior hand a Pastoral Staff Or and on the sinister side a figure representing William Harvey the physician also proper holding in the exterior hand a Heart Gules.
Motto
Salubritas Et Amoenitas

The town council was established in 2004, comprising the area of the former Borough of Folkestone less Folkestone Sandgate ward, which was separately parished. The council comprises eight wards: Cheriton; Morehall; Park; Harvey West; Harvey Central; Harbour; East; and Foord. Each ward returns two or three members, for a total of 18 councillors elected to four-year terms. Each year, Folkestone Town Councillors attend the annual general meeting and mayor-making ceremony to appoint both a mayor and a deputy mayor from their number for the coming year.

== Geography ==
Folkestone is located where the southern edge of the North Downs escarpment meets the sea. In contrast to the white cliffs at Dover further to the east, the cliffs at Folkestone are composed of greensand belonging to the Folkestone Formation and gault clay. A small stream, Pent Brook, cuts through the cliffs at this point, and provided the original haven for fishermen and cross-channel boats. The cliffs are constantly under attack from the sea, and the original headlands, which once protected the port, long ago ceased to do so. Artificial protection, in the form of breakwaters and piers, have been necessary since the 17th century.

The town is now built on both sides of the original valley: the West Cliff and The Bayle to the West, and the East Cliff on the other side of the stream. The Pent Stream now runs through a culvert from the fire station, at the junction of Radnor Park Road, Park Farm and Pavilion Road, until it reaches the inner harbour. Remains of a quay, dating to the 17th century, were discovered under what is now a public car park, between the Old High Street and the railway viaduct, adjacent to the current harbour. Included in the town is Cheriton, where the Channel Tunnel's northern exit is located; Newington; and Peene.

In August 1996 a one-in-600-years storm left homes and businesses in Black Bull Road, in the Foord Valley, under two metres of water. Heavy rainfall combined with inadequacies in the Pent Stream and local drainage caused the flooding. A crowd of 2,332 saw Folkestone Invicta play hosts to West Ham United in a benefit football match following the flood.

=== Climate ===
Folkestone experiences a temperate oceanic climate, much like the rest of England. The air temperature is moderated by its proximity to the coast, however winter temperatures are not as mild as in southwest England. Temperature extremes include a high of 33.6 °C (92.5 °F) recorded on 3 August 1990, and a low of −14.5 °C (5.9 °F) on 10 February 1986. Folkestone receives, on average, 1,931.6 hours of mean annual sunshine – the highest amount for a British mainland weather station.

Climate data for Folkestone Ski Centre (1991–2020 normals, extremes 1908–2003)
Month	Jan	Feb	Mar	Apr	May	Jun	Jul	Aug	Sep	Oct	Nov	Dec	Year
Record high °C (°F)	15.5 (59.9)	15.6 (60.1)	20.0 (68.0)	24.4 (75.9)	27.8 (82.0)	32.0 (89.6)	31.1 (88.0)	33.6 (92.5)	28.9 (84.0)	24.0 (75.2)	17.2 (63.0)	15.0 (59.0)	33.6 (92.5)
Mean daily maximum °C (°F)	7.9 (46.2)	8.1 (46.6)	10.6 (51.1)	13.2 (55.8)	16.3 (61.3)	19.1 (66.4)	21.4 (70.5)	21.5 (70.7)	19.1 (66.4)	15.3 (59.5)	11.3 (52.3)	8.6 (47.5)	14.4 (57.9)
Daily mean °C (°F)	5.2 (41.4)	5.3 (41.5)	7.2 (45.0)	9.4 (48.9)	12.5 (54.5)	15.2 (59.4)	17.5 (63.5)	17.6 (63.7)	15.3 (59.5)	12.0 (53.6)	8.3 (46.9)	6.0 (42.8)	10.9 (51.6)
Mean daily minimum °C (°F)	2.6 (36.7)	2.4 (36.3)	3.8 (38.8)	5.5 (41.9)	8.7 (47.7)	11.3 (52.3)	13.6 (56.5)	13.6 (56.5)	11.5 (52.7)	8.7 (47.7)	5.3 (41.5)	3.4 (38.1)	7.6 (45.7)
Record low °C (°F)	−12.4 (9.7)	−14.5 (5.9)	−6.1 (21.0)	−4.5 (23.9)	−1.9 (28.6)	0.0 (32.0)	4.2 (39.6)	3.1 (37.6)	1.1 (34.0)	−3.4 (25.9)	−6.3 (20.7)	−7.5 (18.5)	−14.5 (5.9)
Average precipitation mm (inches)	76.0 (2.99)	58.7 (2.31)	46.7 (1.84)	47.3 (1.86)	50.3 (1.98)	56.5 (2.22)	53.9 (2.12)	61.5 (2.42)	62.9 (2.48)	95.2 (3.75)	95.2 (3.75)	92.4 (3.64)	796.6 (31.36)
Average precipitation days (≥ 1.0 mm)	13.2	10.7	8.8	8.3	8.4	8.0	7.7	8.1	9.0	12.0	13.0	13.5	120.7
Mean monthly sunshine hours	76.1	92.8	139.2	207.4	238.7	244.0	229.1	241.3	181.7	131.8	82.6	66.7	1,931.6
Source 1: Met Office
Source 2: Starlings Roost Weather

Average sea temperatures for Folkestone
Month	Jan	Feb	Mar	Apr	May	Jun	Jul	Aug	Sep	Oct	Nov	Dec	Year
Average sea temperature °C (°F)	7.6 (45.7)	7.6 (45.7)	7.2 (45.0)	9.0 (48.2)	11.4 (52.5)	14.2 (57.6)	16.1 (61.0)	17.7 (63.9)	17.7 (63.9)	16.1 (61.0)	13.8 (56.8)	10.7 (51.3)	12.4 (54.3)
Source: seatemperature.org

== Economy ==
Folkestone was at one stage a resort town with a developed shipping trade. With the decline of those industries others have filled the gap. The Dormobile works, car conversion manufacturers were based in the town. Church and Dwight, the US company famous for Arm & Hammer baking soda-based consumer products, has its UK headquarters in the town. Silver Spring Mineral Water Company, was the largest independently owned soft drinks manufacturer in Britain, based in Park Farm, but closed down in 2013.

During the 1980s and 1990s the construction of the Channel Tunnel provided employment, as well as bringing many people to the area, and on completion the running of services still provides work for many. Several insurance firms are based in Folkestone. Some of them used to be involved in the shipping trade but have since diversified into other fields. Saga plc has its headquarters in Folkestone.

Along with other Kent seaside towns, there has been a resurgence in domestic tourism linked to a growing arts scene.

== Main sights ==
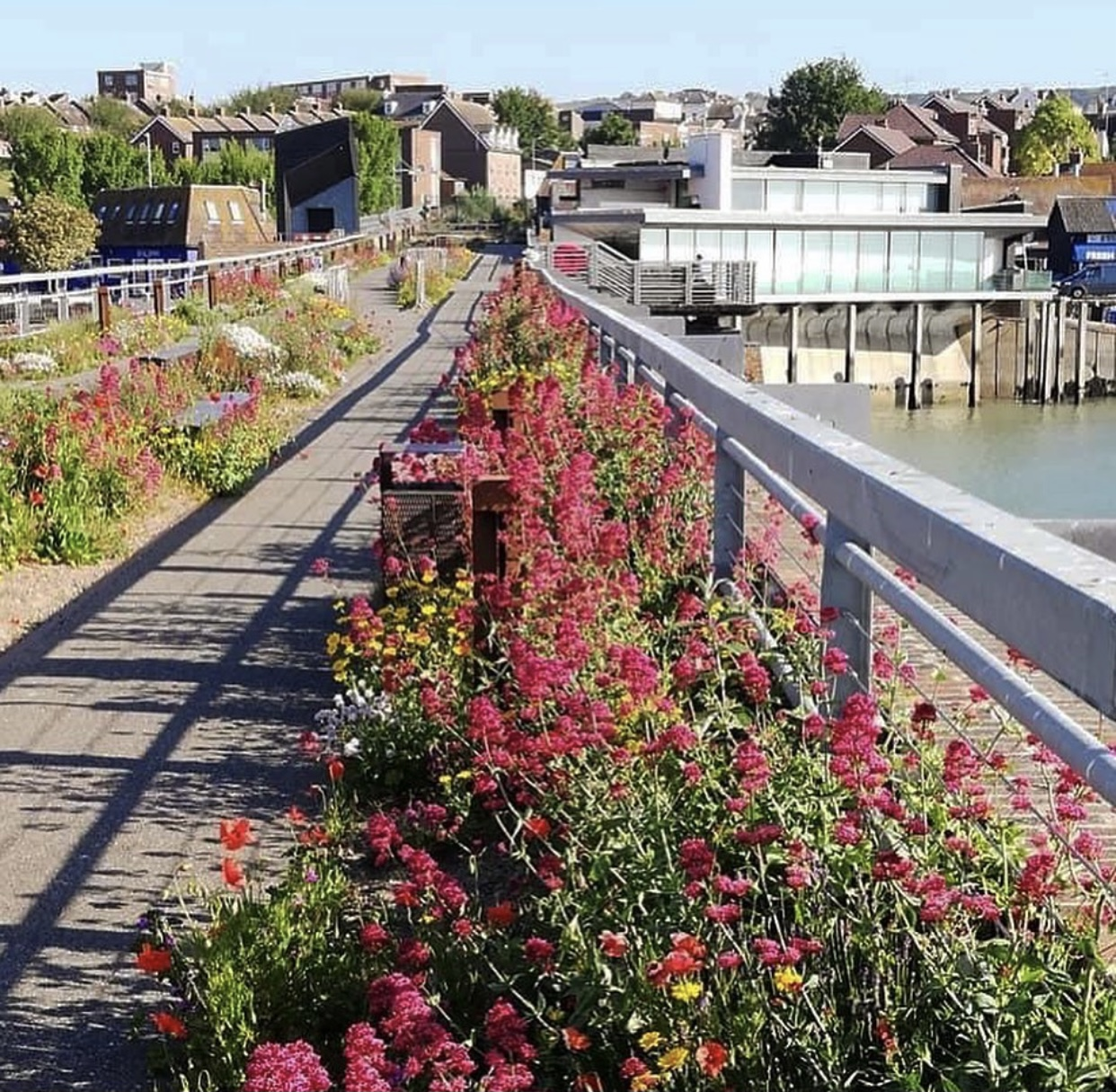
The Harbour Viaduct after renovation

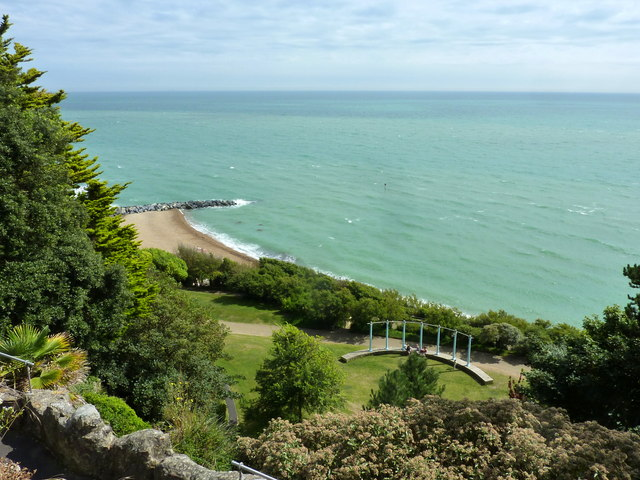
The Amphitheatre

The major landmark in Folkestone, apart from the harbour, is The Leas, the cliffs above the beach. Located in the west part of the town, it is a unique promenade designed in the mid-1800s by Decimus Burton who also worked on Regent's Park, London and St Leonards-on-Sea. The promenade along the sea includes many crescents, hotels, private parks and alleys.

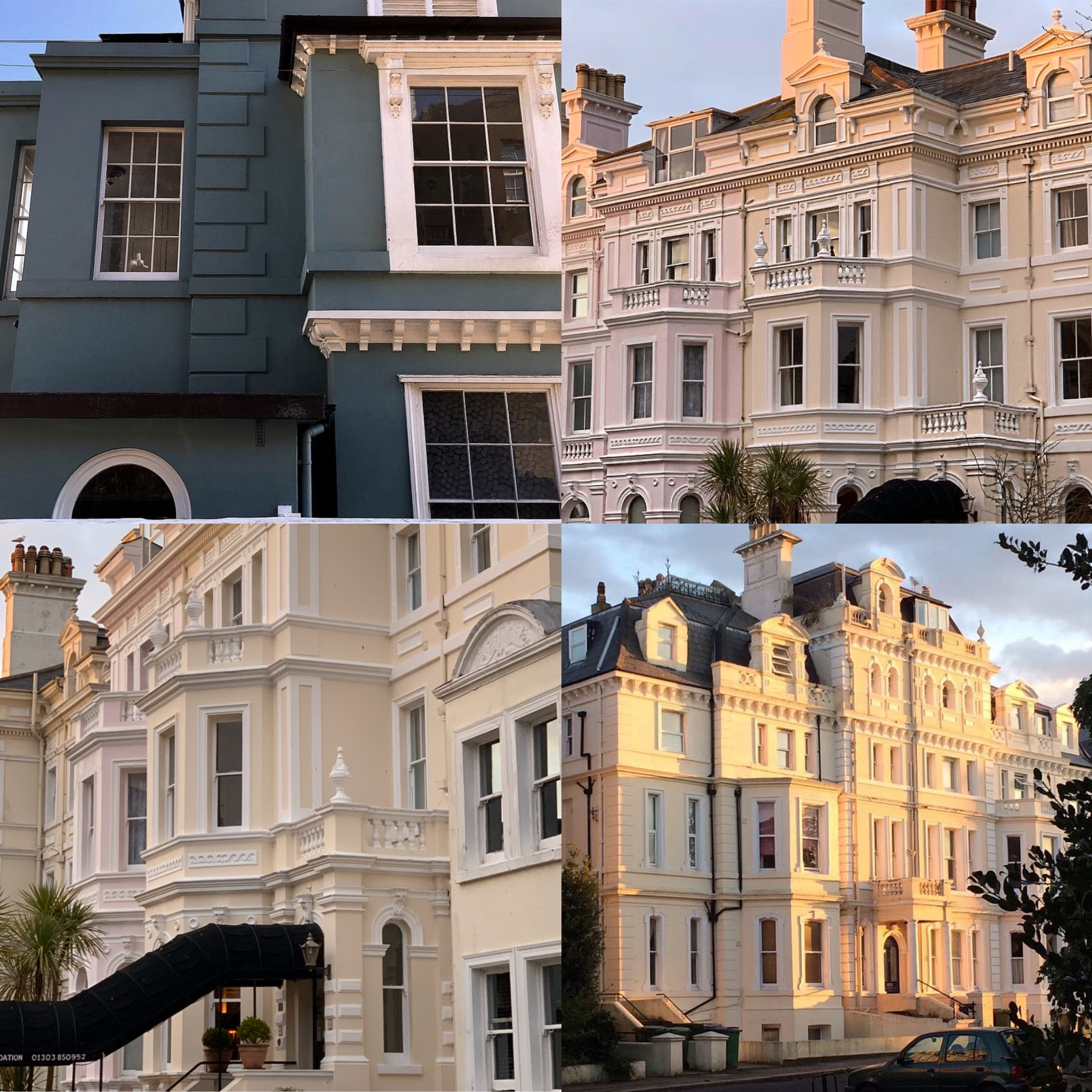
Folkestone's West End

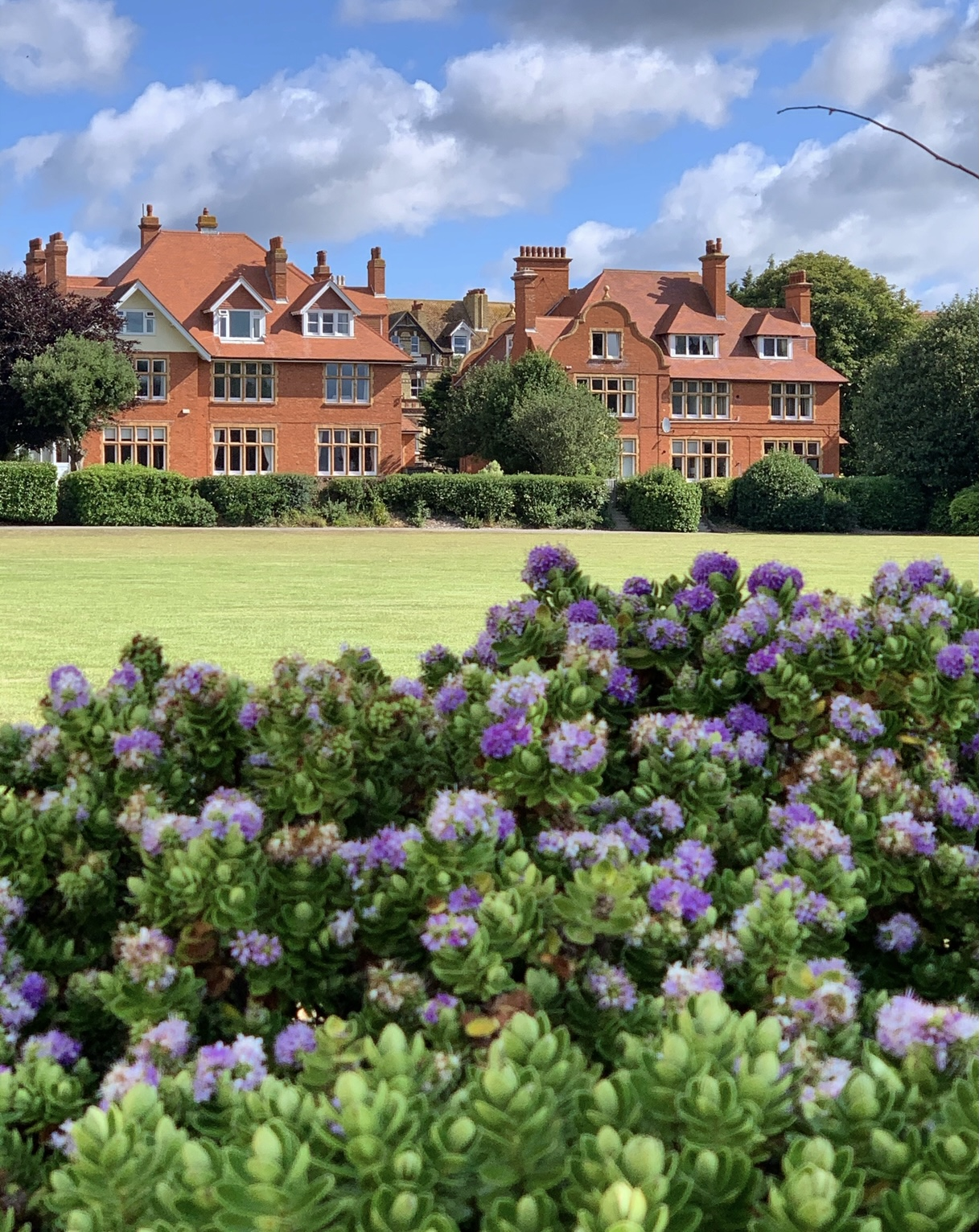
The Leas

A Martello Tower (No 3) stands on the cliff above Copt Point. Built in 1806 as a defence against Napoleon, it has also been a Coast Guard lookout, a family home, a golf clubhouse and a Second World War naval mine control post. It now houses a visitor centre. The Folkestone White Horse is carved on Cheriton Hill above the Channel Tunnel terminal.

The Kent Downs Area of Outstanding Natural Beauty includes part of the town area. The nearby Brockhill Country Park, to the west, with footpaths around a lake and in a valley, links with the Royal Military Canal at Hythe.

Folkestone is near to two important Battle of Britain landmarks: the Battle of Britain Memorial, Capel-le-Ferne and the Kent Battle of Britain Museum.

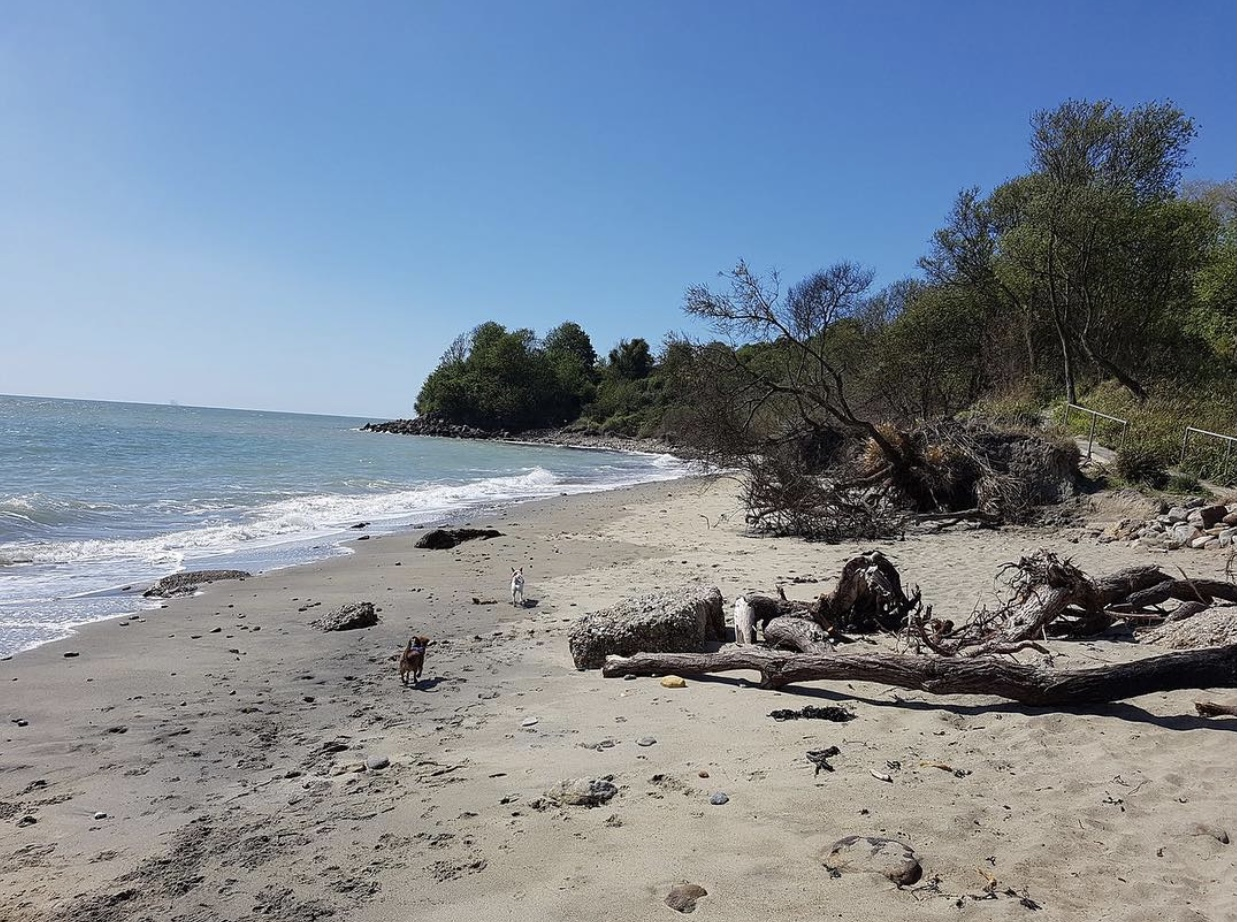
The Warren beach side

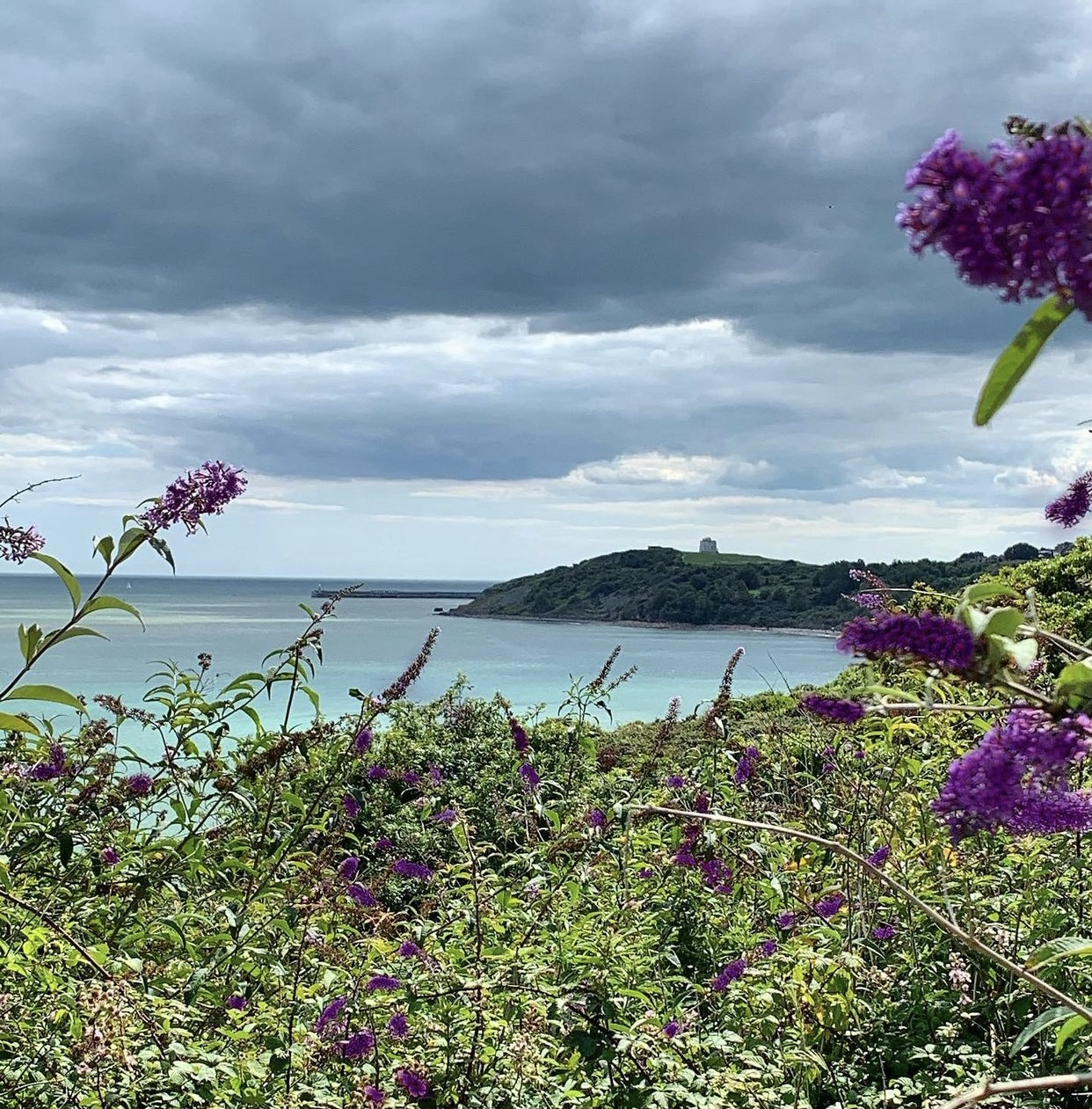
The Warren

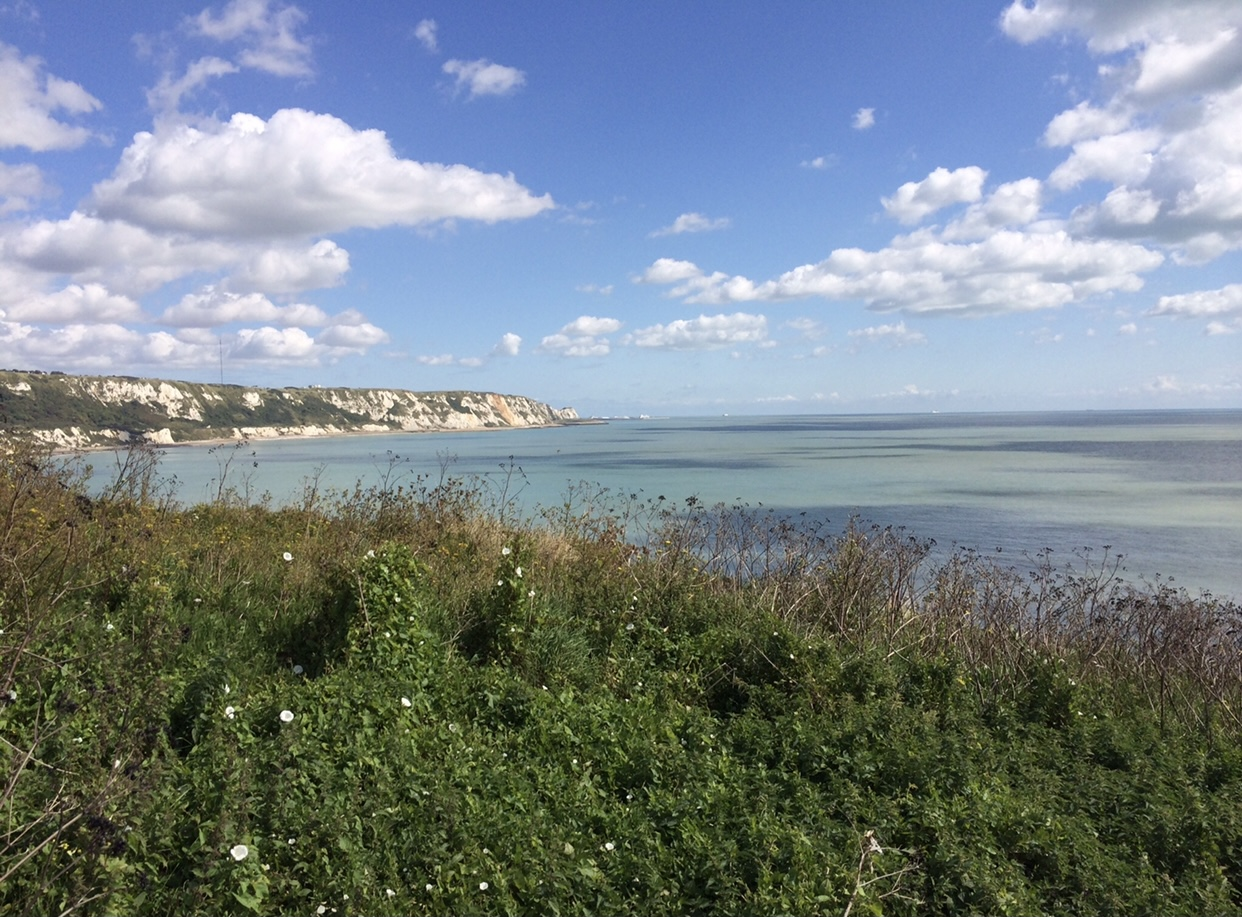
The Warren

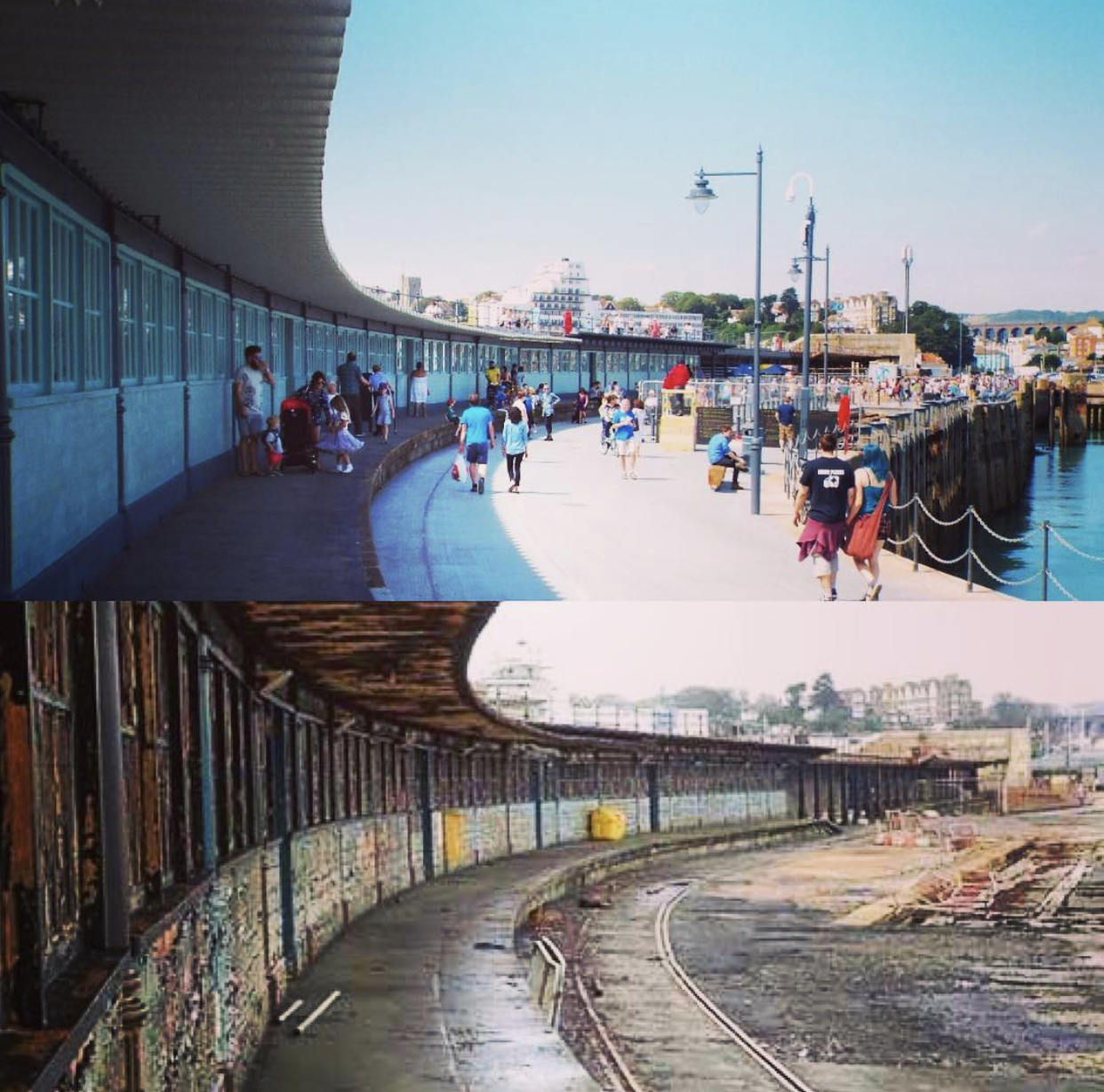
Folkestone harbour before and after renovation

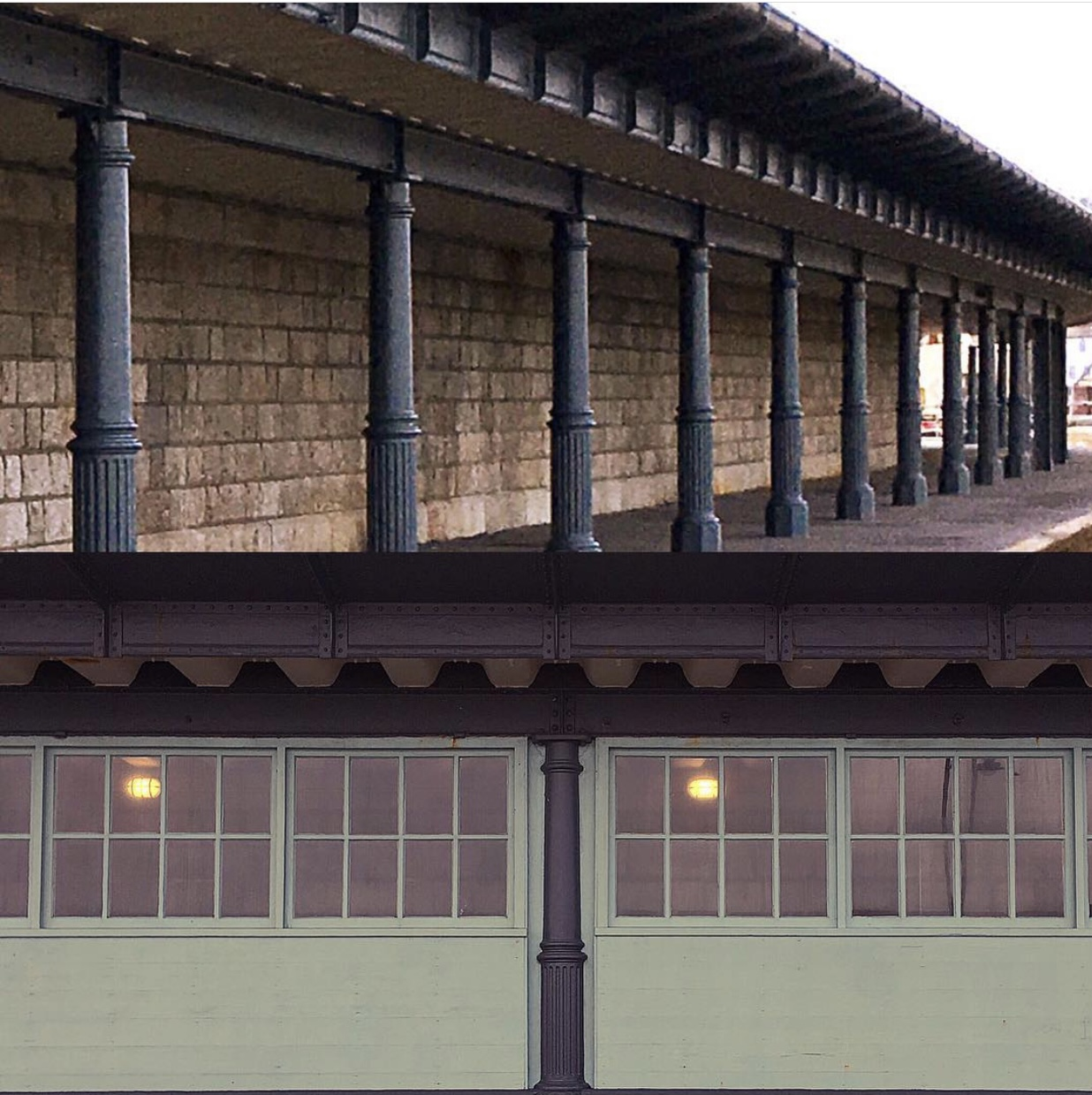
Folkestone Harbour arm after renovation

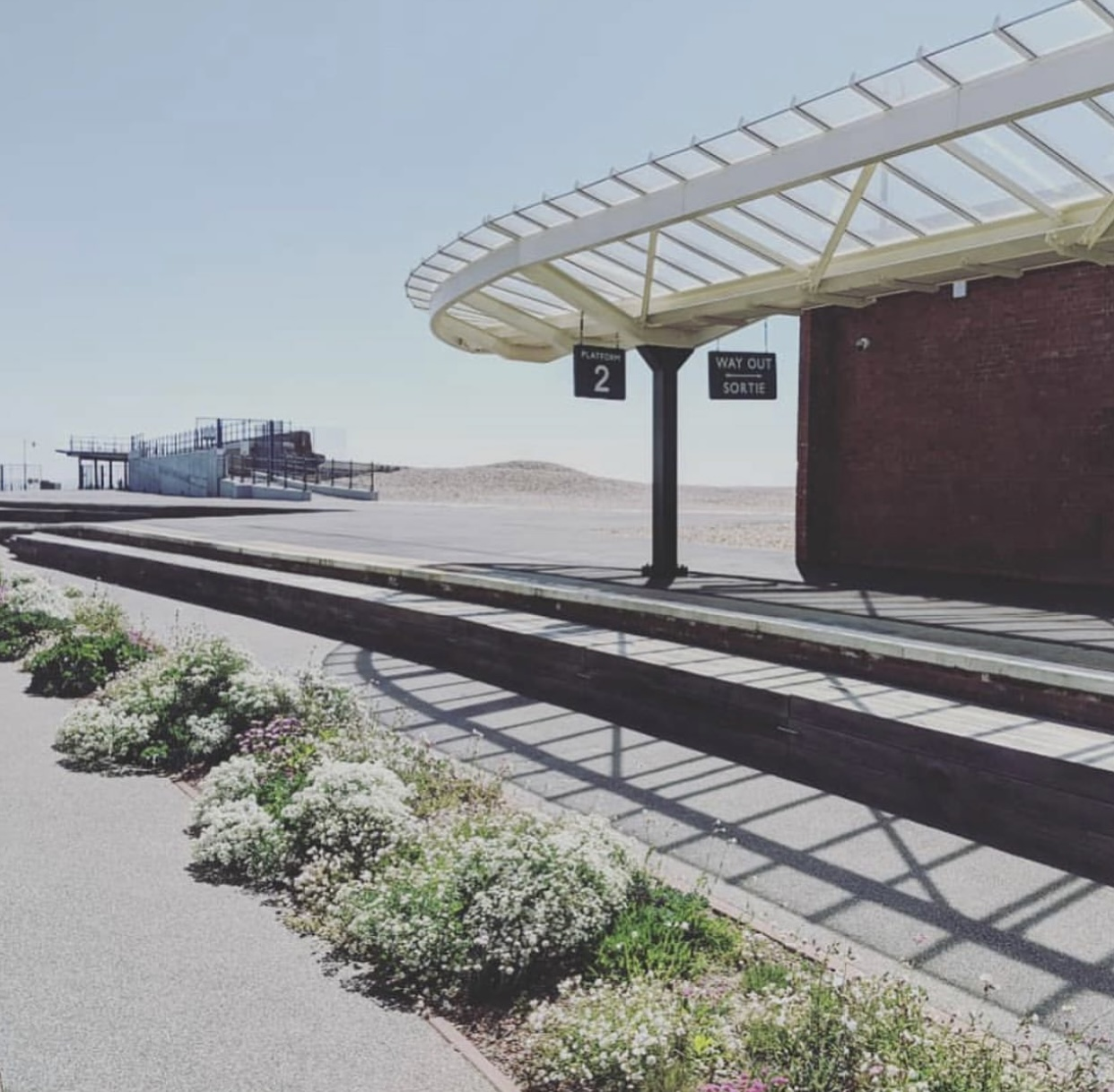
The old station after renovation

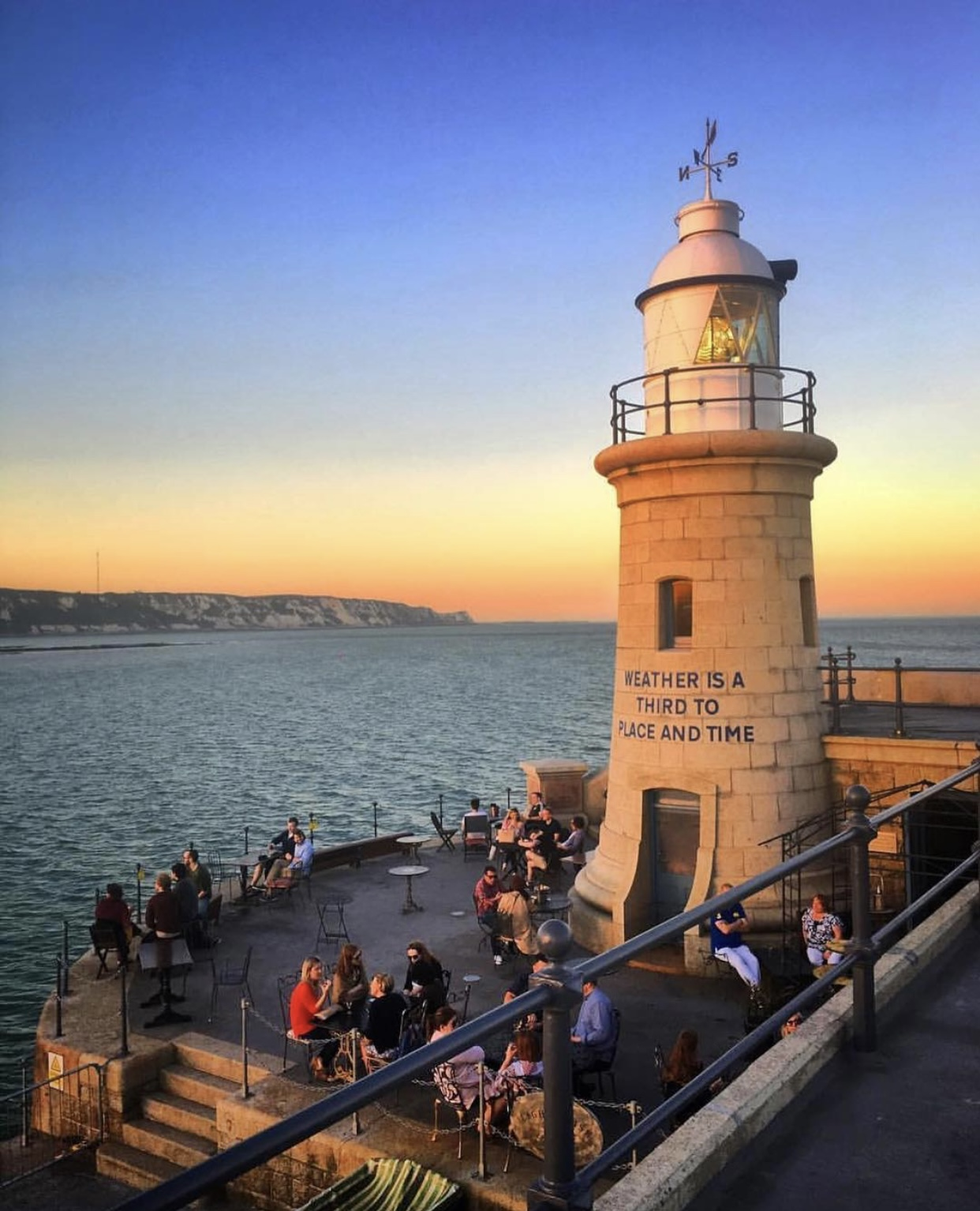
The old lighthouse

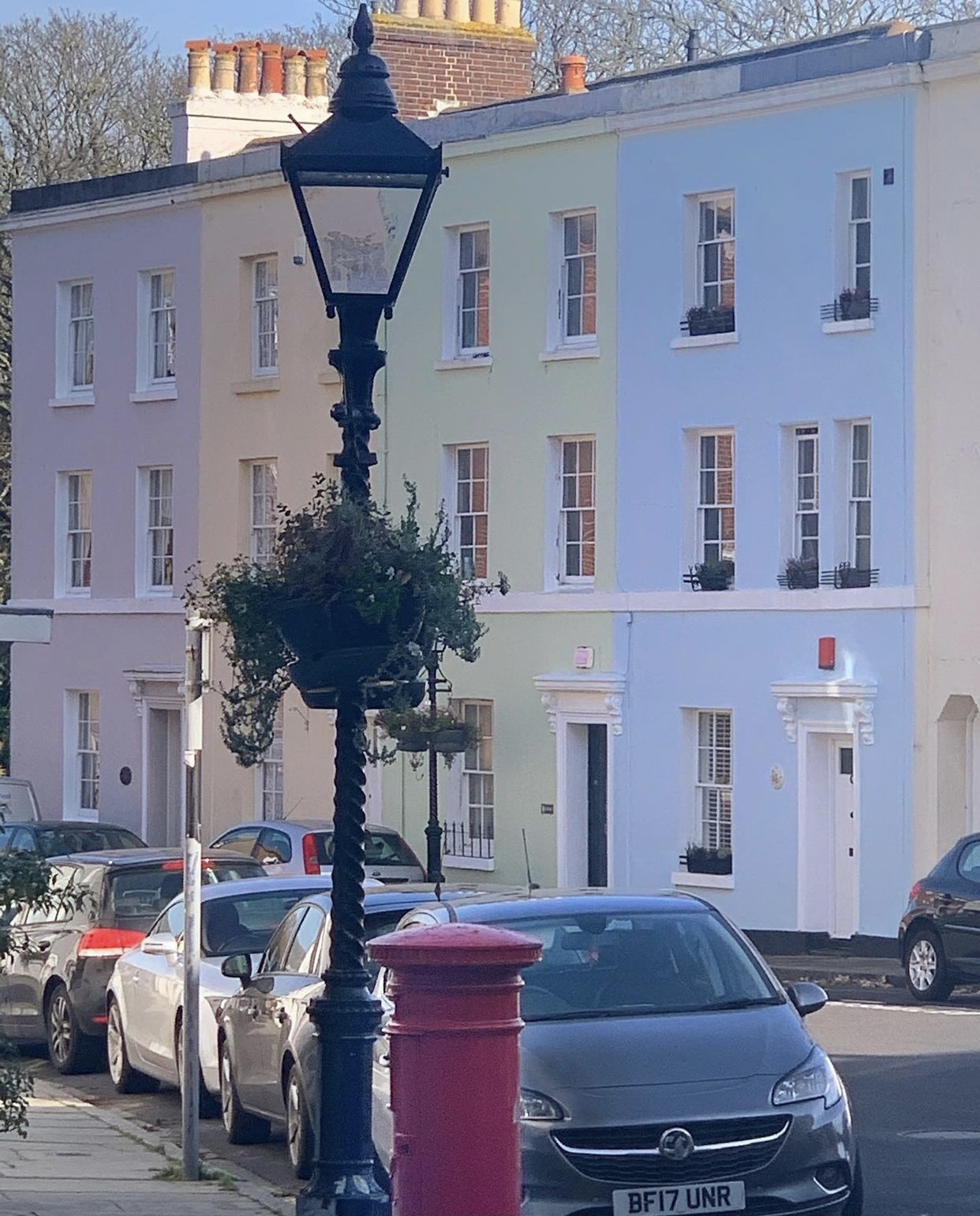
The Bayle

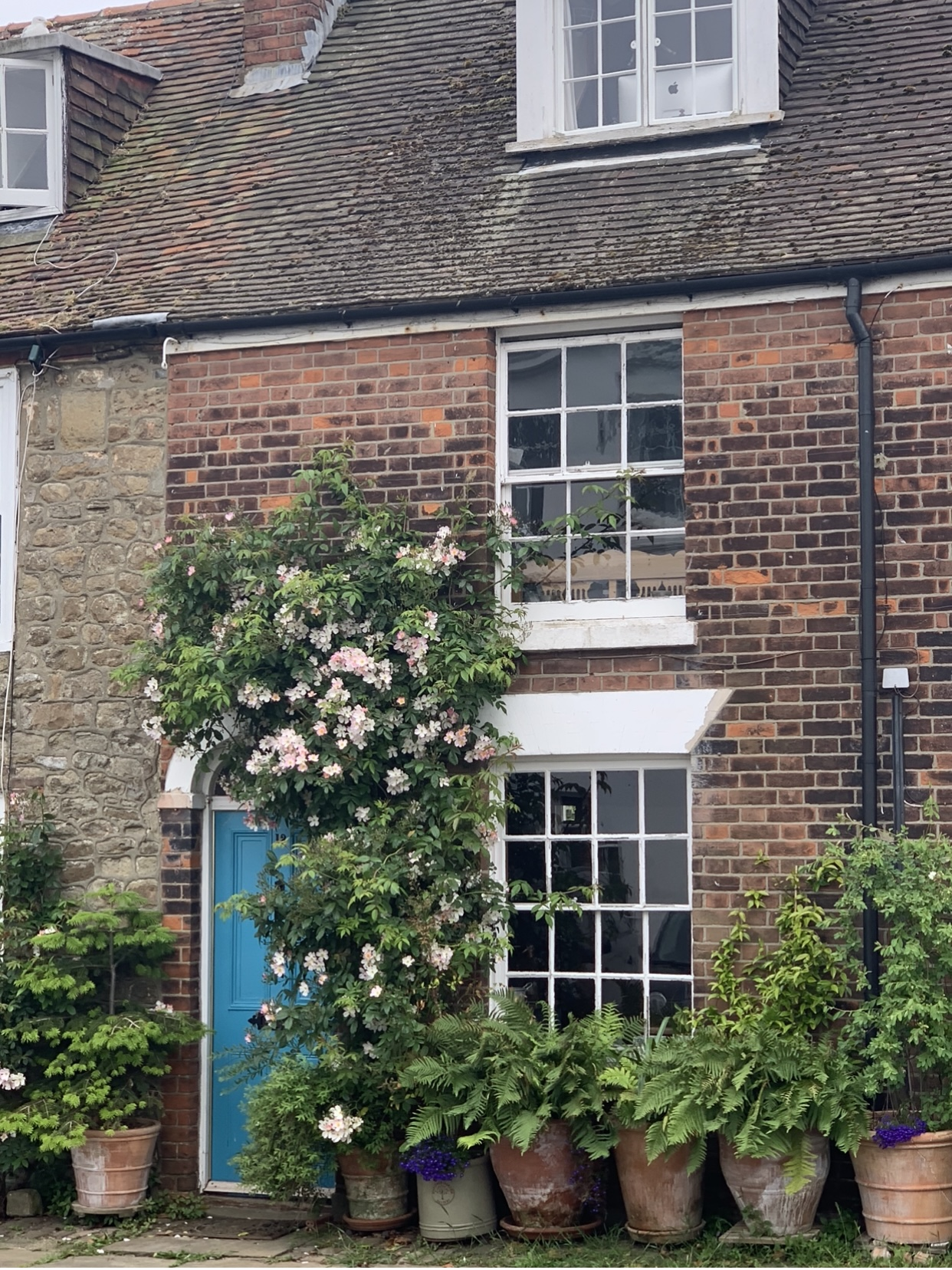
The Bayle

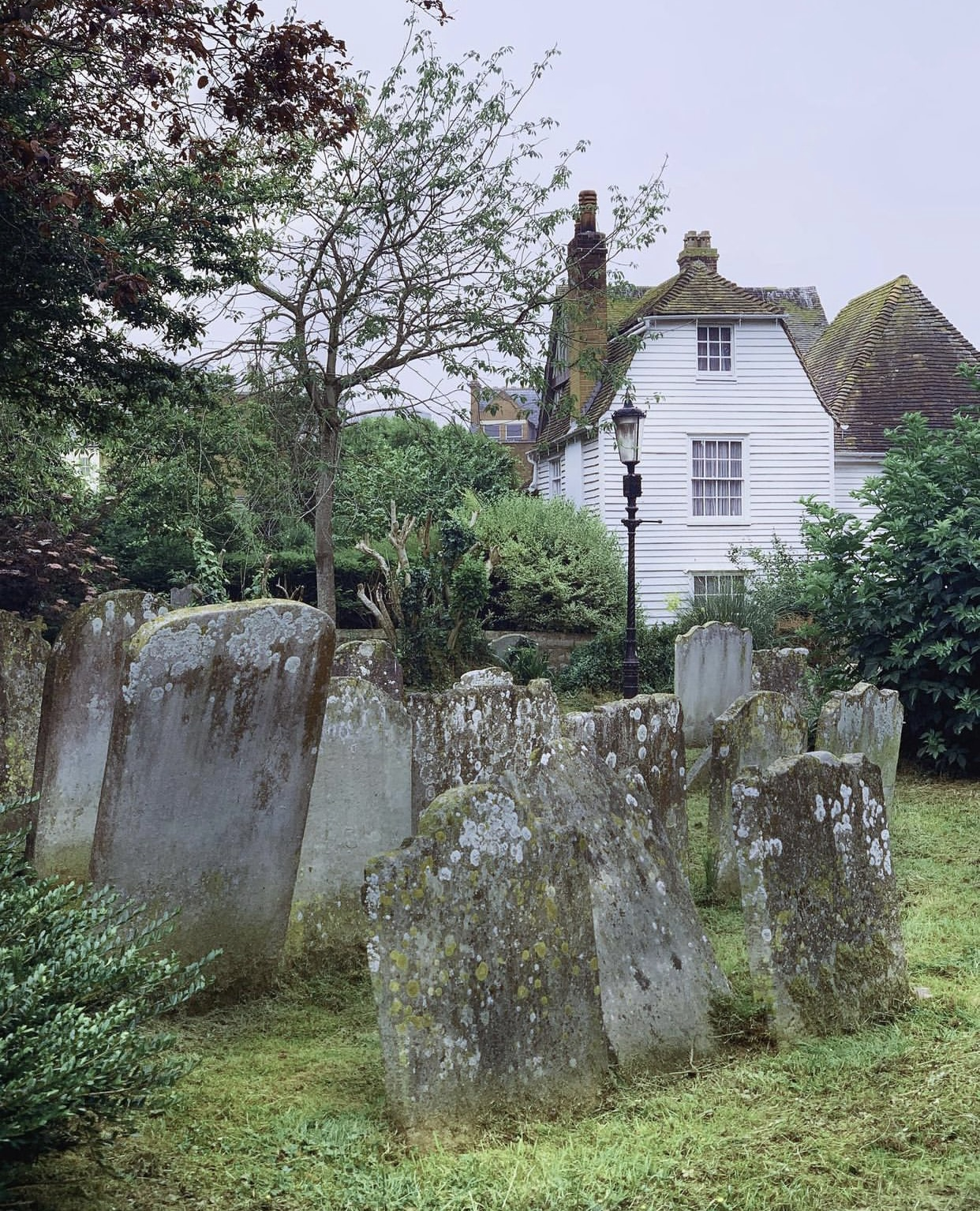
The Bayle

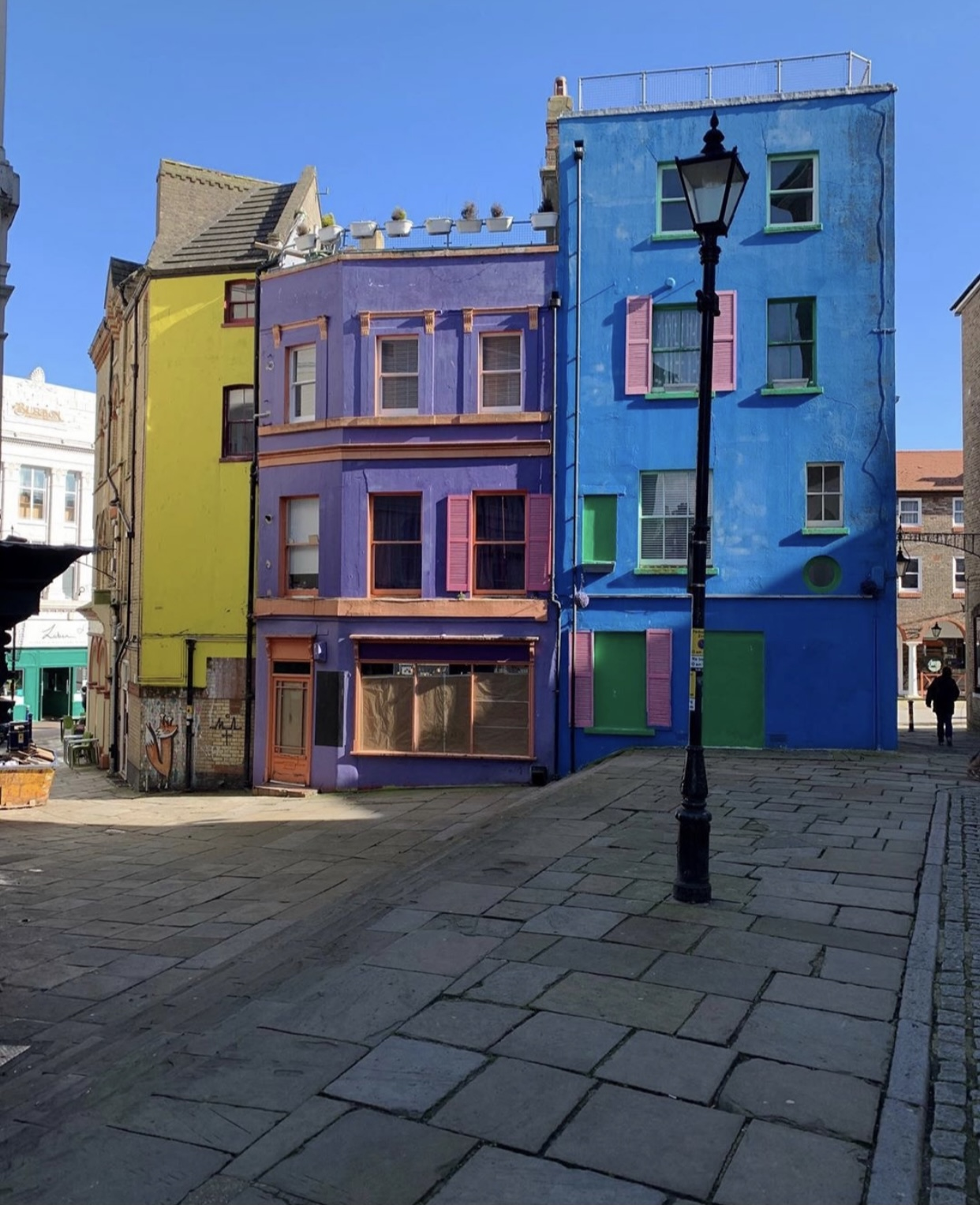
Market Square

The Old High Street is an ancient route connecting the Bayle with the harbour, and is now at the heart of Folkestone's Creative Quarter. The narrow, cobbled slope was one of Charles Dickens' favourite streets. Together with Rendezvous Street, this part of Folkestone is now thriving, with independent businesses and restaurants surrounded by colourful restored buildings.

== Transport ==
Folkestone developed because of its transport links. With France visible across the Strait of Dover, the town became an important transit point for those travelling from the UK to the Continent. Plans to restore ferry traffic to Boulogne, following termination in 2001, were discussed in 2005, but they did not come to fruition. The Channel Tunnel northern entrance is located at Cheriton.

=== Rail ===
The railway reached Folkestone on 28 June 1843 and a temporary railway station was built while the construction of the line to Dover continued. This started with the Foord viaduct, designed by Sir William Cubitt, completed in 1844. Folkestone Junction railway station was then opened and construction through the cliffs between Dover and Folkestone commenced. Once the line was opened to Dover, the town began to prosper (which meant growth westwards), further stations were opened at Folkestone West (originally named Shorncliffe Camp) in 1863, and Folkestone Central in 1884. Folkestone Harbour station was used to transfer passengers from specific trains; the line from the junction was very steep and needed much additional locomotive help. A local group, the Remembrance Line Association, is actively seeking to retain the harbour branch as a tourist/heritage railway operation, though as at 2019 the future was uncertain. Today the domestic services from Folkestone use the Central and West stations on the South Eastern Main Line. Venice-Simplon Orient Express passengers now change at Folkestone West for road coaches and the onward journey through the Channel Tunnel.

High Speed 1 (HS1) is a high speed railway built to French 'LGV' (Ligne à Grande Vitesse) standards, connecting the Channel Tunnel to London. Since December 2009, high speed commuter services from Dover have called at Folkestone and then, using the South Eastern Main Line to Ashford International, the services join HS1 for the journey to Ebbsfleet, Stratford International and London St Pancras. The journey time to London via this route has been reduced to under 1 hour; some trains from Folkestone West take as little as 52 minutes to reach the capital by high speed train.

The Eurotunnel Shuttle terminal, for car transport to Calais by train using the Channel Tunnel, is in the Folkestone suburb of Cheriton.

The Leas Lift, a Victorian water lift that opened in 1885, connects the Leas with the beach.

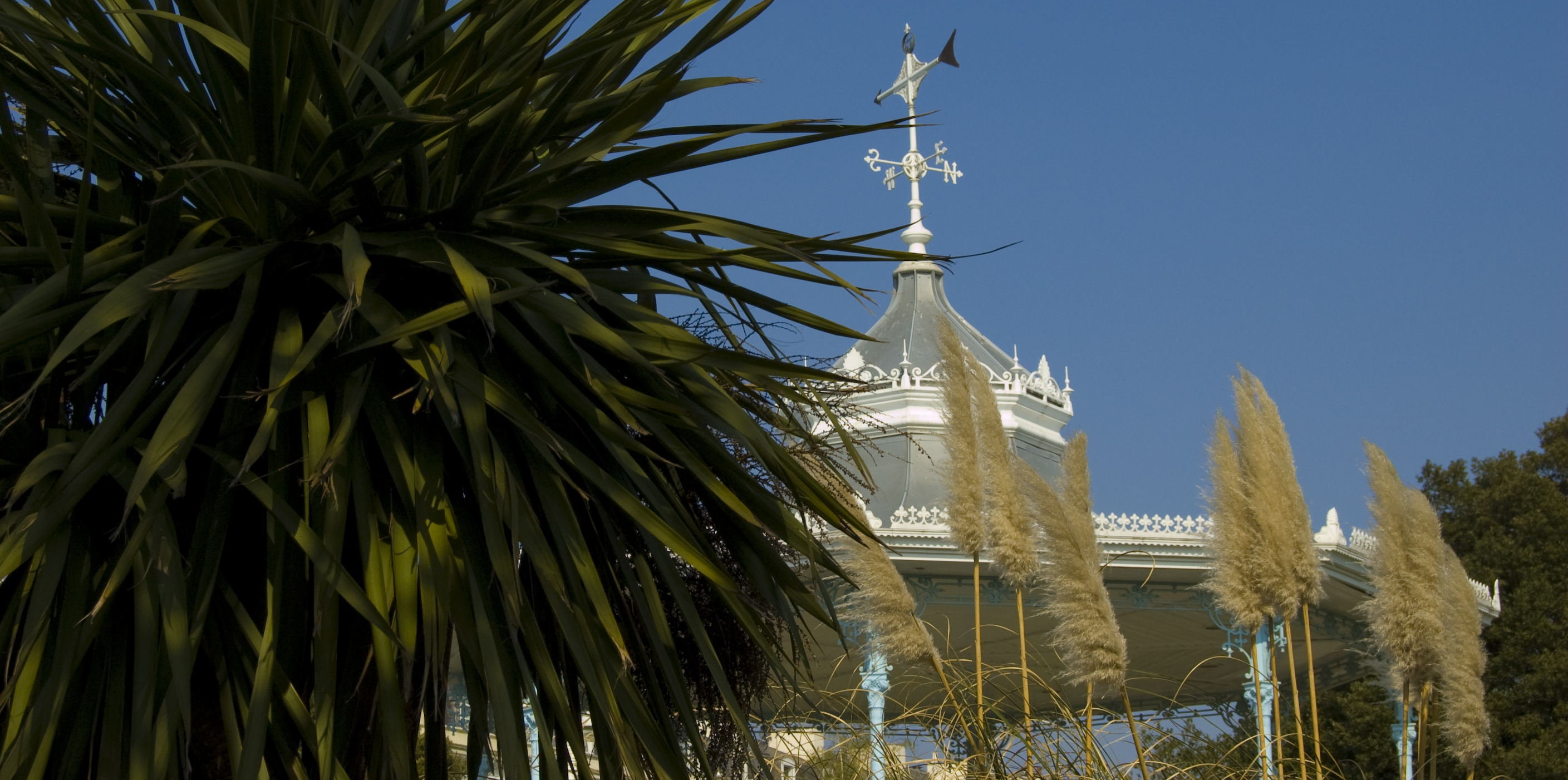
Bandstand near the Leas Cliff Lift

There were two other lifts on the Leas in Folkestone history: the Metropole Lift (closed in 1940) and the Sandgate Hill Lift, which closed in 1918.

=== Roads ===
The town is located at the eastern end of the M20 which provides fast access to Ashford, Maidstone, London and also to the M25. The A20 is motorway-standard to Dover and runs locally towards Ashford and London, following the M20 but runs locally via Sellindge, Ashford, Lenham, Maidstone, Aylesford, Wrotham and Swanley where the A20, M20 and M25 meet and the A20 continues through Sidcup and Lewisham to Central London. Folkestone marks the eastern end of the A259 although this is no longer part of the South Coast Trunk Road east of Brenzett, although it remains a primary route. The road gives access to the Romney Marsh, Hastings, Eastbourne and beyond. To the north, roads connect Folkestone to Canterbury and the nearby villages of Elham and Lyminge.

Stagecoach in East Kent operates local buses from the town. It is served by The Link services to Canterbury, The Wave service to Dover, Romney Marsh and Hastings. Other bus routes run to Hythe, Ashford and Maidstone.

National Express runs coaches to Ashford, Dover, Hythe, Maidstone and London.

== Education ==
Schools and colleges in Folkestone include Folkestone Academy (formed by the merger of Hillside School for Boys and Holywell School for Girls in the early 1970s, and formerly known as Wyndgate Secondary School in the 1970s, the Channel High School in the 1980s, and the Channel School in the 1990s); and Turner Free School (opened in 2018 on the site of Pent Valley Technology College, formerly Pent Valley Secondary Modern, formed by the merger of Harcourt Secondary School for Girls and Morehall Secondary School for Boys in the 1970s).

There are two selective state secondary schools: Folkestone School for Girls (formed by the merger of Folkestone Technical High School for Girls and Folkestone Grammar School for Girls in the 1980s) and the Harvey Grammar School for boys. The latter was founded in 1674. These two schools have a common sixth form timetable.

East Kent College have a Folkestone campus providing a variety of courses including Apprenticeships, Hairdressing and Construction.

From 2007 to 2013, the University Centre Folkestone (a joint initiative of Canterbury Christ Church University and University of Greenwich) was located in the town providing a specialism in Performing Arts.

There are a number of primary schools in the town. State primaries include Folkestone Primary, Sandgate Primary, Morehall Academy and Martello Grove Academy, a new academy that opened in September 2015. Martello Grove Academy moved to new buildings on its campus in Warren Way in autumn 2016.

Footballer and army officer Walter Tull attended the town's Mundella Primary School when it was North Board School.

== Leisure ==
The town is situated at the foot of the North Downs, with views of the surrounding countryside and the coast of France, 24 mi (39 km) away. The area is a magnet for passing migrating birds and the Warren (woodlands adjoining Wear Bay) and the cliffs above are of particular interest during the spring and autumn periods. These are now part of East Cliff and Warren Country Park.

Folkestone Parks and Pleasure Grounds Charities are lands which were donated to the people of Folkestone for perpetual recreational use by the Earls of Radnor during the 19th century. The lands are administered by Shepway District Council, with the Cabinet members forming the Board of Trustees. Previously, the Charter Trustees were also Trustees of the Charities, but that arrangement lapsed upon the parishing of the Folkestone and Sandgate area. Negotiations are ongoing regarding the transfer of the lands to Folkestone Town Council and Sandgate Parish Council.

There are two major long distance footpaths through the town. The North Downs Way, starting its course in Surrey, reaches the coast at Folkestone and continues through Capel-le-Ferne, and to its end at Dover, some 8 mi (13 km) away. The Saxon Shore Way starts at Gravesend, Kent and traces the Kent coast as it was in Roman times, via Folkestone, as far as Hastings, East Sussex, 163 miles (262 km) in total.

Nearby places of interest include the Kent Battle of Britain Museum and the Battle of Britain Memorial, Capel-le-Ferne.

== Culture ==
Folkestone has been home to many galleries over the years. The long-established Metropole Galleries, located in the one-time Metropole Hotel on the Leas, staged year round exhibitions until it closed in 2008. Its place has been largely taken by the Creative Foundation. The Foundation has opened a medium scale theatre, conference and music venue in the heart of the Creative Quarter named Quarterhouse. It offers a year-round programme of live music, comedy, film, talks, theatre and children's entertainment. George's House Gallery and Googie's Art Cafe hold frequent exhibitions by local artists and the Folkestone Art Society, established in 1928, holds three annual art exhibitions and publishes an annual art review of work by local artists. Leas Cliff Hall is the biggest entertainment and function venue in Folkestone with a large choice of concerts, comedy and theatre. An earlier venue the Pleasure Gardens Theatre opened in 1886, later converting into a cinema before closing in 1964.

The first Folkestone Triennial art event took place between June and September 2008 with artists such as Christian Boltanski and Tracey Emin making site specific work for a wide variety of locations around the town. Many of the commissioned works remain permanently in the town. The 2011 Triennial 'A Million Miles From Home' was launched on 24 September 2010 and commissioned 19 international artists to develop new works for Folkestone's streets, squares, beaches and historic buildings.

Folkestone has an annual Chamber Music Festival each May curated by the Sacconi Quartet. The festival is based in the town's 13th century Parish Church of St Mary and St Eanswythe in the Bayle and comprises concerts of chamber and ensemble music with guest performers. The church also hosts a series of Sunday afternoon concerts under the auspices of Bayle Music presenting local, national and international performers as well as occasional concerts by visiting choirs and ensembles. Folkestone New Music promotes concerts of contemporary music and Folkestone Early Music explores music, from medieval to baroque, through a year-round programme of concerts, talks and workshops.

The annual Folkestone Documentary Festival was founded in 2021 and takes place at the Silver Screen Cinema and Creative Folkestone Quarterhouse each October. The festival also hosts the Folkestone Doc Club at the Silver Screen Cinema, which brings the latest and greatest documentaries to Folkestone every month.

Folkestone, together with Hythe, has an amateur theatre group: Folkestone & Hythe Operatic & Dramatic Society. It is a charitable organisation, producing and performing several different shows a year at its own venue, the Tower Theatre, located in Shorncliffe. The society also has a youth section, which puts on three performances a year at the Tower Theatre: the Brigadier Thomas Memorial Competition, a summer show and a Christmas revue.

The literary journal The Frogmore Papers, published by the Frogmore Press, was founded in Folkestone in 1983. The Folkestone Book Festival takes place every November.

Folkestone Museum, which holds a collection of fossils, archaeological remains and paintings relocated to Folkestone Town Hall in spring 2017.

Folkestone has an annual Comic Convention each May organised by Planet Folkestone. The convention is a volunteer-run event which raising funds for local charities including Academy FM, East Kent Hospitals and Help for Heroes. Each year more than 7,000 people attend the event, which brings celebrities from TV and film to the coastal town. Folkestone Film, TV and Comic Con 2016 had many actors attending including the television actors Sylvester McCoy and Peter Davison from Dr Who and Julian Glover from Game of Thrones. The 2018 event took place at the iconic Leas Cliff Hall.

Folkestone is home to the Hellfire Film Festival that runs throughout the year at various locations.

An annual Zombie Walk also takes place in Folkestone around Halloween with permission from the district council. The walk is a way for adults and children to celebrate Halloween and has a larger and larger following every year. In 2016, in the event's 6th year, the organisers, Planet Folkestone, announced that they were stepping down from organising the free event as they could no longer commit their own time and resources to the event due to its ever-increasing costs and restrictions.

Strange Cargo was established in Folkestone in 1995. The group put on a number of annual events including the Cheriton Light Festival in the winter and Charivari Day, a street parade taking place in July which all local schools are invited to take part in.

== Local media ==
Folkestone has two paid-for newspapers. One of them is Folkestone and Hythe Express (a weekly title published by the KM Group). It was previously part of the Kentish Express series but relaunched in October 2013 and is part of the KM Group's portfolio which also includes KentOnline.co.uk. The other is Folkestone Herald (published by Kent Regional News and Media, part of the Local World group). There is also a monthly paid magazine Folkestone, Hythe & Romney Life.

Free newspapers for the town include the Folkestone and Hythe Extra, part of the KM Group; and yourshepway, part of KOS Media. Kent Regional News and Media previously published the Folkestone Adscene, but this was merged with the paid for Herald in 2008.

Following the monthly magazine The Quarter, which ran from 2003 to 2005, a new arts magazine Folkestone Creative has been published locally since 2005. It reviews events and developments throughout Folkestone, Hythe and the villages nearby.

Local television news programmes are BBC South East Today and ITV News Meridian.

A 24-hour community radio station, Radio Folkestone, began broadcasting in March 2011 as Academy FM Folkestone on 105.9FM. It adopted its current name in May 2024. The radio station is operated by a charity (Academy FM Folkestone, No.1137248) funded by sources including the Folkestone Academy, the Roger De Haan Charitable Trust, the Kent Community Foundation, and various National Lottery funds. The station carries commercial advertising and sponsorship under the terms of its Ofcom license.

KMFM Shepway and White Cliffs Country is the local commercial radio station for Folkestone, broadcasting on 96.4FM. The station was founded in Dover as Neptune Radio in 1997 but rebranded and moved to Folkestone in 2003 following a takeover by the KM Group. The studios moved to Ashford in 2009. The station started broadcasting county-wide in January 2011, with adverts and sponsors now being the only local content. BBC Radio Kent also broadcasts to the town, as does Heart South.

Folkestone is also served by a low power small scale radio station, BFBS Radio, which broadcasts on 105.4FM. This is to serve the Gurkha community who reside in West Folkestone and who are based at Shorncliffe Barracks. The station is licensed by OFCOM and its signal can be received within 1 mile of the barracks.

== Sport ==
Folkestone Invicta Football Club was formed in 1936 and played in the Eastern Section of the Kent Amateur League (now the Kent County League), taking over the Cheriton Road ground in early 1991 after the demise of the old Folkestone F.C. which had had a long history in the Southern League.

Folkestone Rugby Club was formed in 1974 and currently play in London and SE league 4. The club runs 4 adult, a ladies and various colts teams. A former ladies player, Catherine Spencer, captained the England women's national rugby union team to a grand slam in 2008.

Folkestone Cricket Club currently competes in the first division of the Kent Cricket League. It was formed in 1851. Current Kent players such as Robbie Joseph and Geraint Jones, plus Neil Dexter, who moved to Middlesex CCC at the end of the 2008 season, have all represented the club. James Tredwell, who came through the youth academy, is still heavily involved with the club.

Folkestone is home to Astra, one of the most prominent Motorcycle Grasstrack clubs. Their meetings take place at Swingfield Minnis and over the years have hosted a number of championship meetings. In 2007 and 2016 they hosted the European Grasstrack Championship finals and well as the Team Long Track World Championship Team Cup in 2013. They hosted the major domestic championship — the British Masters — in 2000, 2008, 2010, 2011 and 2014.

Folkestone Optimist Hockey Club are based at Three Hills Sports Park (along with the cricket and netball clubs).

There is a bowls club and a running club based in the town.

Folkestone hosted the 5th Chess Olympiad in 1933. Among others, the artist Marcel Duchamp took part as a member of the French team.

== People ==
There are a large number of people with connections to the town who have made themselves important in one sphere or another. Men such as William Harvey and his father Thomas Harvey Mayor in 1600 here, discoverer of the circulation of the blood; and Samuel Plimsoll who invented the line named after him for ship safety. Walter Tull, the first black officer in the British army was born here.

There have been many actors and actresses, David Tomlinson was brought up in the town, while others started their careers at Arthur Brough's Folkestone Repertory Company including Robert Arnold; comedians including Michael Bentine (who was in the local patrol of the ARP) and a large number of artists in various fields. Wilkie Collins, Radclyffe Hall, A. E. Coppard and Catherine Crowe were all writers; and there have also been musicians: Noel Redding among them.

King Edward VII and his mistress Alice Keppel (great-grandmother of Queen Camilla) regularly enjoyed the luxury (and discretion) of the Grand Hotel on the Leas.

Eamon Everall, artist/educator and founder member of the Stuckism art movement, attended Harvey Grammar School and Folkestone School of Art and still maintains a base here.

Actress June Brown had two homes in the town. Jimmy Hill, presenter of Match of the Day, was stationed at Folkestone Garrison during post-World War II military service, during which time he entertained troops and played for the local football team.

The novelist Jocelyn Brooke, who died in 1966, wrote evocatively about Folkestone, his birth town, and Sandgate in his memoirs. Rosemary Stewart the Canadian insurance heiress resided here for an extended period, known for dedication to coastal swimming from the harbour. During her time she continued to increase her fortune by becoming a significant player in the rag trade.

Former Prime Minister of New Zealand William Hall-Jones was born and raised in Folkestone.

== Twin towns ==
Folkestone is twinned with:

- Boulogne-sur-Mer, France
- Middelburg, Netherlands
- Étaples-sur-Mer, France
- Tres de Febrero, Argentina
- Mechinagar, Nepal

== In popular culture ==
Author Russell Hoban repurposes Folkestone as "Fork Stoane" in his 1980, post apocalyptic novel Riddley Walker.

== See also ==
- 2007 Kent earthquake
- Folkestone power station
- Trinity House Pilot Station
- Listed buildings in Folkestone

== Sources ==
- White, H.P. (1961). A regional history of the railways of Great Britain, II Southern England. London: Phoenix House.
