= Listed buildings in Folkestone =

Historic structures in Kent, England

Folkestone is a town and civil parish in the Folkestone and Hythe District of Kent, England. It contains one grade I, five II*, 120 grade II listed buildings that are recorded in the National Heritage List for England.

This list is based on the information retrieved online from Historic England

== Key ==
| Grade | Criteria |
|---|---|
| I | Buildings that are of exceptional interest |
| II* | Particularly important buildings of more than special interest |
| II | Buildings that are of special interest |

== Listing ==
| Name | Grade | Location | Type | Completed (Note: The date given is the date used by Historic England as significant for the initial building or that of an important part in the structure's description.) | Date designated | Grid ref. (Note: The grid reference is based on the British national grid reference system, sometimes known as OSGB36, used by the Ordnance Survey.) Geo-coordinates | Notes | Entry number (Note: The "List Entry Number" is a unique number assigned to each listed building and scheduled monument by Historic England.) | Image | Wikidata |
|---|---|---|---|---|---|---|---|---|---|---|
| 1 and 2, Albion Villas | II | 1 and 2, Albion Villas | | | 11 March 1975 | TR2284335803; 51°04′42″N 1°10′48″E | | 1084382 | Upload Photo | Q26368031 |
| 3 and 4, Albion Villas | II | 3 and 4, Albion Villas | | | 11 March 1975 | TR2286935810; 51°04′42″N 1°10′49″E | | 1344125 | Upload Photo | Q26627875 |
| 5 and 6, Albion Villas | II | 5 and 6, Albion Villas | | | 11 March 1975 | TR2289335822; 51°04′42″N 1°10′51″E | | 1338844 | Upload Photo | Q26623135 |
| Electricity Junction Box Outside Nos. 12-14 | II | Bathurst Rd | | | 30 March 2007 | TR2113436025; 51°04′51″N 1°09′21″E | | 1391909 | Upload Photo | Q26671250 |
| Railway Viaduct | II | Bradstone Road | | | 11 March 1975 | TR2271936412; 51°05′02″N 1°10′43″E | | 1061235 | Upload Photo | Q26314357 |
| Church of St Saviour | II | Canterbury Road | | | 20 April 1977 | TR2291837053; 51°05′22″N 1°10′55″E | | 1251151 | Upload Photo | Q26543142 |
| United Reformed Church | II | Castle Hill Avenue | | | 11 March 1975 | TR2220636175; 51°04′55″N 1°10′16″E | | 1061236 | Upload Photo | Q26314358 |
| 12, Cheriton Place | II | 12, Cheriton Place | | | 16 October 1989 | TR2259035829; 51°04′43″N 1°10′35″E | | 1251148 | Upload Photo | Q26543140 |
| Cheriton Road Cemetery | II | Cheriton Road, CT20 1DF | | | 27 May 2020 | TR2122236511; 51°05′07″N 1°09′26″E | | 1468684 | Upload Photo | Q96494383 |
| Barn to North of Broadmead Manor | II | Cherry Garden Avenue | | | 11 March 1975 | TR2111936920; 51°05′20″N 1°09′22″E | | 1061241 | Upload Photo | Q26314362 |
| Broadmead | II | Cherry Garden Avenue | | | 11 March 1975 | TR2106936683; 51°05′13″N 1°09′19″E | | 1065723 | Upload Photo | Q26318768 |
| Broadmead Manor | II | 21, Cherry Garden Avenue | | | 5 December 1949 | TR2112336905; 51°05′20″N 1°09′22″E | | 1061240 | Upload Photo | Q26314361 |
| Cobblestones in Front of Nos 22 and 24 | II | Church Street | | | 11 March 1975 | TR2294235915; 51°04′45″N 1°10′53″E | | 1344112 | Upload Photo | Q26627862 |
| Former Municipal Offices | II | Church Street | | | 11 March 1975 | TR2296835929; 51°04′46″N 1°10′55″E | | 1067816 | Upload Photo | Q26320609 |
| Lamp Bracket and Bollard to North West of Parish Church | II | Church Street | | | 11 March 1975 | TR2289135879; 51°04′44″N 1°10′51″E | | 1068893 | Upload Photo | Q26321584 |
| Paving to Churchyard | II | Church Street | | | 11 March 1975 | TR2292835874; 51°04′44″N 1°10′53″E | | 1344111 | Upload Photo | Q26627861 |
| Stone Cross in Churchyard of the Parish Church of St Mary and St Eanswythe | II | Church Street | | | 11 March 1975 | TR2296635890; 51°04′44″N 1°10′55″E | | 1344149 | Upload Photo | Q26627899 |
| Sundial in Churchyard of the Parish Church of St Mary and St Eanswythe | II | Church Street | | | 11 March 1975 | TR2296735887; 51°04′44″N 1°10′55″E | | 1356202 | Upload Photo | Q26638889 |
| The Parish Church of St Mary and St Eanswythe | II* | Church Street | | | 5 December 1949 | TR2295935863; 51°04′43″N 1°10′54″E | | 1068556 | Upload Photo | Q17546000 |
| 3 Bollards to South of Parish Church, Church Street | II | 3 Bollards To South Of Parish Church, Church Street | | | 11 March 1975 | TR2293235805; 51°04′42″N 1°10′53″E | | 1068894 | Upload Photo | Q26321585 |
| 6 Bollards to North East of Parish Church, Church Street | II | 6 Bollards To North East Of Parish Church, Church Street | | | 11 March 1975 | TR2298735891; 51°04′44″N 1°10′56″E | | 1068576 | Upload Photo | Q26321280 |
| 7 Bollards to North of Parish Church, Church Street | II | 7 Bollards To North Of Parish Church, Church Street | | | 11 March 1975 | TR2294935922; 51°04′45″N 1°10′54″E | | 1344150 | Upload Photo | Q26627900 |
| 12-16, Church Street | II | 12-16, Church Street | | | 11 March 1975 | TR2293735942; 51°04′46″N 1°10′53″E | | 1068895 | Upload Photo | Q26321586 |
| 18 and 20, Church Street | II* | 18 and 20, Church Street | | | 5 December 1949 | TR2293535926; 51°04′46″N 1°10′53″E | | 1356216 | Upload Photo | Q17546132 |
| 22 and 24, Church Street | II | 22 and 24, Church Street | | | 11 March 1975 | TR2293435916; 51°04′45″N 1°10′53″E | | 1068896 | Upload Photo | Q26321587 |
| 26 and 28, Church Street | II | 26 and 28, Church Street | | | 11 March 1975 | TR2293235912; 51°04′45″N 1°10′53″E | | 1356179 | Upload Photo | Q26638870 |
| 1 and 3, Clifton Crescent | II | 1 and 3, Clifton Crescent | | | 11 March 1975 | TR2210335442; 51°04′31″N 1°10′09″E | | 1068897 | Upload Photo | Q26321588 |
| 2, Clifton Crescent | II | 2, Clifton Crescent | | | 11 March 1975 | TR2209535482; 51°04′32″N 1°10′09″E | | 1356160 | Upload Photo | Q26638854 |
| 4, Clifton Crescent | II | 4, Clifton Crescent | | | 11 March 1975 | TR2207035490; 51°04′33″N 1°10′08″E | | 1344115 | Upload Photo | Q26627865 |
| 5 and 7, Clifton Crescent | II | 5 and 7, Clifton Crescent | | | 11 March 1975 | TR2208035448; 51°04′31″N 1°10′08″E | | 1068604 | Upload Photo | Q26321305 |
| 6 and 8, Clifton Crescent | II | 6 and 8, Clifton Crescent | | | 11 March 1975 | TR2203835490; 51°04′33″N 1°10′06″E | | 1068901 | Upload Photo | Q26321592 |
| 9, Clifton Crescent | II | 9, Clifton Crescent | | | 11 March 1975 | TR2205335450; 51°04′31″N 1°10′07″E | | 1344113 | Upload Photo | Q26627863 |
| 10, Clifton Crescent | II | 10, Clifton Crescent | | | 11 March 1975 | TR2199635484; 51°04′33″N 1°10′04″E | | 1068663 | Upload Photo | Q26321361 |
| 11 and 12b, Clifton Crescent | II | 11 and 12b, Clifton Crescent | | | 11 March 1975 | TR2203035452; 51°04′32″N 1°10′06″E | | 1068898 | Upload Photo | Q26321589 |
| 12 and 14, Clifton Crescent | II | 12 and 14, Clifton Crescent | | | 11 March 1975 | TR2196335479; 51°04′32″N 1°10′02″E | | 1344116 | Upload Photo | Q26627866 |
| 15 and 17, Clifton Crescent | II | 15 and 17, Clifton Crescent | | | 11 March 1975 | TR2200535449; 51°04′31″N 1°10′04″E | | 1068611 | Upload Photo | Q26321311 |
| 16 and 18, Clifton Crescent | II | 16 and 18, Clifton Crescent | | | 11 March 1975 | TR2193135460; 51°04′32″N 1°10′00″E | | 1068902 | Upload Photo | Q26321593 |
| 19 and 21, Clifton Crescent | II | 19 and 21, Clifton Crescent | | | 11 March 1975 | TR2196435435; 51°04′31″N 1°10′02″E | | 1344114 | Upload Photo | Q26627864 |
| 20 and 22, Clifton Crescent | II | 20 and 22, Clifton Crescent | | | 11 March 1975 | TR2190835441; 51°04′31″N 1°09′59″E | | 1068672 | Upload Photo | Q26321370 |
| 23 and 25, Clifton Crescent | II | 23 and 25, Clifton Crescent | | | 11 March 1975 | TR2194335422; 51°04′31″N 1°10′01″E | | 1068899 | Upload Photo | Q26321590 |
| 27 and 29, Clifton Crescent | II | 27 and 29, Clifton Crescent | | | 11 March 1975 | TR2192235406; 51°04′30″N 1°10′00″E | | 1068634 | Upload Photo | Q26321335 |
| 31, Clifton Crescent | II | 31, Clifton Crescent | | | 11 March 1975 | TR2190935390; 51°04′30″N 1°09′59″E | | 1068900 | Upload Photo | Q26321591 |
| Coolinge Farmhouse Including Wall | II | Coolinge Lane, Cheriton | | | 5 December 1949 | TR2075136196; 51°04′57″N 1°09′02″E | | 1068903 | Upload Photo | Q26321594 |
| Coolinge House | II | Coolinge Lane, Cheriton | | | 11 March 1975 | TR2075336226; 51°04′58″N 1°09′02″E | | 1061208 | Upload Photo | Q26314330 |
| 106, Dover Road | II | 106, Dover Road | | | 11 March 1975 | TR2323436472; 51°05′03″N 1°11′10″E | | 1344136 | Upload Photo | Q26627886 |
| 108, Dover Road | II | 108, Dover Road, CT20 1QY | | | 11 March 1975 | TR2323036485; 51°05′03″N 1°11′09″E | | 1061211 | Upload Photo | Q26314333 |
| Burlington Hotel | II | Earls Avenue | | | 11 March 1975 | TR2183535457; 51°04′32″N 1°09′56″E | | 1344137 | Upload Photo | Q26627887 |
| St Andrews Hotel and Chapel | II | East Cliff Gardens, Flokestone | | | 11 March 1975 | TR2340736208; 51°04′54″N 1°11′18″E | | 1061213 | Upload Photo | Q26314335 |
| East Pier | II | Folkestone Harbour | | | 30 January 2008 | TR2352536022; 51°04′48″N 1°11′23″E | | 1392378 | Upload Photo | Q26671599 |
| Harvey Manor | II | Foord Road, CT20 1HH | | | 20 January 1998 | TR2273336237; 51°04′56″N 1°10′43″E | | 1376803 | Upload Photo | Q26657321 |
| Grace Chapel | II | Grace Hill | | | 11 March 1975 | TR2287636210; 51°04′55″N 1°10′51″E | | 1061216 | Upload Photo | Q26314338 |
| Library and Museum | II | Grace Hill | | | 11 March 1975 | TR2289636199; 51°04′54″N 1°10′52″E | | 1061215 | Upload Photo | Q26314337 |
| Masonic Hall | II | Grace Hill | | | 11 March 1975 | TR2288836147; 51°04′53″N 1°10′51″E | | 1061217 | Upload Photo | Q26314339 |
| The Guildhall | II | Guildhall Street | | | 11 March 1975 | TR2290636019; 51°04′49″N 1°10′52″E | | 1061218 | Upload Photo | Q26314340 |
| Malvina House | II | 79, Harbour Way | | | 5 December 1949 | TR2318736317; 51°04′58″N 1°11′07″E | | 1061219 | Upload Photo | Q26314341 |
| Church of All Souls | II | High Street, Cheriton | | | 11 March 1975 | TR2023036811; 51°05′18″N 1°08′36″E | | 1061220 | Upload Photo | Q26314342 |
| Range of Stone Barns at the Firs | II | High Street, Cheriton | | | 11 March 1975 | TR1955636922; 51°05′22″N 1°08′02″E | | 1344138 | Upload Photo | Q26627888 |
| The Firs | II | High Street, Cheriton | | | 11 March 1975 | TR1960736951; 51°05′23″N 1°08′04″E | | 1068861 | Upload Photo | Q26321556 |
| Church of St Martin | I | Horn Street, Cheriton | | | 5 December 1974 | TR1893836473; 51°05′09″N 1°07′29″E | | 1061197 | Upload Photo | Q17529934 |
| Roman Catholic Church of Our Lady Help of Christians | II | Including The Presbytery To The South East, Guildhall Street | | | 11 March 1975 | TR2273636111; 51°04′52″N 1°10′43″E | | 1068791 | Upload Photo | Q26321486 |
| Barn to South of Ingles Manor | II | Jointon Road | | | 11 March 1975 | TR2204635920; 51°04′47″N 1°10′07″E | | 1203875 | Upload Photo | Q26499379 |
| Ingles Manor | II | Jointon Road | | | 11 March 1975 | TR2202835973; 51°04′48″N 1°10′07″E | | 1061198 | Upload Photo | Q26314320 |
| 1-14, Marine Crescent | II | 1-14, Marine Crescent | | | 31 October 1974 | TR2294135738; 51°04′39″N 1°10′53″E | | 1061202 | Upload Photo | Q26314324 |
| 4-7, Marine Parade | II | 4-7, Marine Parade | | | 11 March 1975 | TR2313635797; 51°04′41″N 1°11′03″E | | 1203957 | Upload Photo | Q26499455 |
| 8 and 9, Marine Parade | II | 8 and 9, Marine Parade | | | 11 March 1975 | TR2311735785; 51°04′41″N 1°11′02″E | | 1344170 | Upload Photo | Q26627917 |
| 10-15, Marine Parade | II | 10-15, Marine Parade | | | 11 March 1975 | TR2308935778; 51°04′41″N 1°11′01″E | | 1061203 | Upload Photo | Q26314325 |
| The Grand Hotel Including Surrounding Wall | II | Metropole Road East | | | 13 November 1973 | TR2170235406; 51°04′30″N 1°09′49″E | | 1344131 | Upload Photo | Q26627881 |
| The New Metropole Including the Fountain in the Garden to the North and Surrounding Wall | II | Metropole Road East | | | 13 November 1973 | TR2161235394; 51°04′30″N 1°09′44″E | | 1204004 | Upload Photo | Q26499500 |
| The Life Boat Inn | II | 42, North Street | | | 11 March 1975 | TR2329836188; 51°04′54″N 1°11′12″E | | 1344132 | Upload Photo | Q26627882 |
| The Samuel Peto | II | 23, Rendezvous Street, Folkstone, CT20 1EY | | | 11 March 1975 | TR2291736058; 51°04′50″N 1°10′52″E | | 1061165 | Upload Photo | Q26314290 |
| Army Ordnance Depot | II | Risborough Barracks, Shorncliffe Camp, Shepway | | | 13 November 2013 | TR1965236064; 51°04′55″N 1°08′05″E | | 1417352 | Upload Photo | Q26676580 |
| Enbrook | II | Risborough Lane, Cheriton | | | 11 March 1975 | TR2001036543; 51°05′10″N 1°08′24″E | | 1344155 | Upload Photo | Q26627904 |
| Enbrook Manor House | II | Risborough Lane, Cheriton | | | 4 December 1949 | TR2004136543; 51°05′10″N 1°08′26″E | | 1061166 | Upload Photo | Q26314291 |
| Folkestone War Memorial | II* | Road Of Remembrance | | | 24 June 2010 | TR2280035755; 51°04′40″N 1°10′46″E | | 1393854 | Upload Photo | Q17546144 |
| Church of the Holy Trinity | II* | Sandgate Road | | | 11 March 1975 | TR2195035598; 51°04′36″N 1°10′02″E | | 1344160 | Upload Photo | Q17546094 |
| K6 Telephone Kiosk | II | Sandgate Road, Island Site Junction With Trinity Crescent | | | 29 September 1987 | TR2197335558; 51°04′35″N 1°10′03″E | | 1251098 | Upload Photo | Q26543094 |
| Lloyds Bank | II | Sandgate Road | | | 11 March 1975 | TR2281135879; 51°04′44″N 1°10′47″E | | 1061180 | Upload Photo | Q26314304 |
| Pillar Box | II | Sandgate Road | | | 11 March 1975 | TR2195835558; 51°04′35″N 1°10′02″E | | 1281309 | Upload Photo | Q26570369 |
| Ruins of Christ Church | II | Sandgate Road | | | 11 March 1975 | TR2239135722; 51°04′40″N 1°10′25″E | | 1204257 | Upload Photo | Q26499721 |
| Former Gas Showroom | II | 70 and 72, Sandgate Road | | | 20 February 2007 | TR2269135812; 51°04′42″N 1°10′40″E | | 1391879 | Upload Photo | Q26671219 |
| 88, Sandgate Road | II | 88, Sandgate Road | | | 11 March 1974 | TR2263535799; 51°04′42″N 1°10′37″E | | 1344159 | Upload Photo | Q26627908 |
| 132, Sandgate Road | II | 132, Sandgate Road, CT20 2BW | | | 11 March 1975 | TR2246235741; 51°04′40″N 1°10′28″E | | 1061179 | Upload Photo | Q26314303 |
| 149, Sandgate Road | II | 149, Sandgate Road | | | 11 March 1975 | TR2243935691; 51°04′39″N 1°10′27″E | | 1061181 | Upload Photo | Q26314305 |
| 151, Sandgate Road | II | 151, Sandgate Road | | | 11 March 1975 | TR2243135686; 51°04′39″N 1°10′27″E | | 1204285 | Upload Photo | Q26499746 |
| Priory House | II | The Bayle | | | 11 March 1975 | TR2301335892; 51°04′44″N 1°10′57″E | | 1344126 | Upload Photo | Q26627876 |
| Statue in the Grounds of the Battery | II | The Bayle | | | 11 March 1975 | TR2309135968; 51°04′47″N 1°11′01″E | | 1344147 | Upload Photo | Q26627897 |
| The Battery | II | The Bayle | | | 11 March 1975 | TR2311335976; 51°04′47″N 1°11′02″E | | 1061232 | Upload Photo | Q26314354 |
| 4 and 6, The Bayle | II | 4 and 6, The Bayle | | | 11 March 1975 | TR2301535896; 51°04′44″N 1°10′57″E | | 1338873 | Upload Photo | Q26623159 |
| 5-13, The Bayle | II | 5-13, The Bayle | | | 11 March 1975 | TR2302435930; 51°04′46″N 1°10′58″E | | 1068921 | Upload Photo | Q26321613 |
| 8, The Bayle | II | 8, The Bayle | | | 11 March 1975 | TR2302835899; 51°04′45″N 1°10′58″E | | 1068922 | Upload Photo | Q26321614 |
| 12, The Bayle | II | 12, The Bayle | | | 11 March 1975 | TR2303635899; 51°04′45″N 1°10′58″E | | 1068923 | Upload Photo | Q26321615 |
| 14 and 16, The Bayle | II | 14 and 16, The Bayle | | | 11 March 1975 | TR2304035900; 51°04′45″N 1°10′58″E | | 1338878 | Upload Photo | Q26623163 |
| 18, The Bayle | II | 18, The Bayle | | | 11 March 1975 | TR2304635896; 51°04′44″N 1°10′59″E | | 1344127 | Upload Photo | Q26627877 |
| 26 and 28, The Bayle | II | 26 and 28, The Bayle | | | 11 March 1975 | TR2305635925; 51°04′45″N 1°10′59″E | | 1084338 | Upload Photo | Q26367982 |
| 30 and 32, The Bayle | II | 30 and 32, The Bayle | | | 11 March 1975 | TR2304635922; 51°04′45″N 1°10′59″E | | 1061231 | Upload Photo | Q26314353 |
| 34-40, The Bayle | II | 34-40, The Bayle | | | 11 March 1975 | TR2304735931; 51°04′46″N 1°10′59″E | | 1344146 | Upload Photo | Q26627896 |
| The Guildhall | II | 42, The Bayle, CT20 1SQ | | | 11 March 1975 | TR2307736003; 51°04′48″N 1°11′00″E | | 1061233 | Upload Photo | Q26314355 |
| 82, The Bayle | II | 82, The Bayle | | | 11 March 1975 | TR2303336031; 51°04′49″N 1°10′58″E | | 1344148 | Upload Photo | Q26627898 |
| 84 and 86, The Bayle | II | 84 and 86, The Bayle | | | 11 March 1975 | TR2302236031; 51°04′49″N 1°10′58″E | | 1061234 | Upload Photo | Q26314356 |
| Church of St Peter | II | The Durlocks | | | 11 March 1975 | TR2339436169; 51°04′53″N 1°11′17″E | | 1061212 | Upload Photo | Q26314334 |
| Bandstand | II | The Leas | | | 11 March 1975 | TR2222535457; 51°04′31″N 1°10′16″E | | 1061200 | Upload Photo | Q26314322 |
| Leas Cliff Hall | II | The Leas | | | 27 July 1999 | TR2240235510; 51°04′33″N 1°10′25″E | | 1387728 | Upload Photo | Q6510259 |
| Statue of William Harvey on Plinth | II | The Leas | | | 11 March 1975 | TR2234035537; 51°04′34″N 1°10′22″E | | 1281488 | Upload Photo | Q26570535 |
| The Leas Club | II | The Leas | | | 24 December 2007 | TR2266235708; 51°04′39″N 1°10′39″E | | 1392353 | Upload Photo | Q26671576 |
| The Leas Lift | II* | The Leas | | | 28 April 1989 | TR2274535668; 51°04′37″N 1°10′43″E | | 1061185 | Upload Photo | Q26263409 |
| The Manor House | II | The Leas | | | 11 March 1975 | TR2183735396; 51°04′30″N 1°09′55″E | | 1203900 | Upload Photo | Q26499401 |
| Wall and Gatepiers to the Manor House | II | The Leas | | | 11 March 1975 | TR2185335412; 51°04′30″N 1°09′56″E | | 1344169 | Upload Photo | Q26627916 |
| 18 and 19, The Leas | II | 18 and 19, The Leas | | | 11 March 1975 | TR2251035624; 51°04′36″N 1°10′31″E | | 1061199 | Upload Photo | Q26314321 |
| 26, The Leas | II | 26, The Leas | | | 27 November 1974 | TR2245635598; 51°04′36″N 1°10′28″E | | 1344168 | Upload Photo | Q26627915 |
| 4, The Old High Street | II | 4, The Old High Street | | | 5 December 1949 | TR2298936024; 51°04′49″N 1°10′56″E | | 1068885 | Upload Photo | Q26321577 |
| 20 and 22, The Old High Street | II | 20 and 22, The Old High Street | | | 11 March 1975 | TR2305336050; 51°04′49″N 1°10′59″E | | 1344140 | Upload Photo | Q26627890 |
| 23 and 25, The Old High Street | II | 23 and 25, The Old High Street | | | 11 March 1975 | TR2301736053; 51°04′50″N 1°10′57″E | | 1343658 | Upload Photo | Q26627441 |
| 24, The Old High Street | II | 24, The Old High Street | | | 11 March 1975 | TR2305736050; 51°04′49″N 1°11′00″E | | 1068891 | Upload Photo | Q26321582 |
| 26-30, The Old High Street | II | 26-30, The Old High Street | | | 11 March 1975 | TR2306336049; 51°04′49″N 1°11′00″E | | 1061223 | Upload Photo | Q26314345 |
| 53, The Old High Street | II | 53, The Old High Street | | | 11 March 1975 | TR2310836065; 51°04′50″N 1°11′02″E | | 1061221 | Upload Photo | Q26314343 |
| 55, The Old High Street | II | 55, The Old High Street | | | 11 March 1975 | TR2311236064; 51°04′50″N 1°11′02″E | | 1068877 | Upload Photo | Q26321569 |
| 57, The Old High Street | II | 57, The Old High Street | | | 11 March 1975 | TR2311636064; 51°04′50″N 1°11′03″E | | 1344139 | Upload Photo | Q26627889 |
| 59, The Old High Street | II | 59, The Old High Street | | | 11 March 1975 | TR2312036063; 51°04′50″N 1°11′03″E | | 1061222 | Upload Photo | Q26314344 |
| Martello Tower No. 1 | II | The Warren | | | 8 April 2008 | TR2410237317; 51°05′29″N 1°11′56″E | | 1392511 | Upload Photo | Q26671728 |
| Martello Tower No 2 | II | Wear Bay Road | | | 29 April 1986 | TR2398036980; 51°05′18″N 1°11′49″E | | 1262942 | Upload Photo | Q26553778 |
| Folkestone Harbour | II | | | | 23 January 2012 | TR2331435935; 51°04′45″N 1°11′12″E | | 1404114 | Upload Photo | Q26675673 |
| Junction of Wear Bay Crescent and Wear Bay Road | II | CT19 6AX | | | 29 January 2019 | TR2365436359; 51°04′59″N 1°11′31″E | | 1459864 | Upload Photo | Q61262428 |
| Lighthouse at End of Folkestone Harbour Outer Pier | II | | | | 30 January 2008 | TR2389035601; 51°04′34″N 1°11′41″E | | 1392377 | Upload Photo | Q26671598 |
| Pulhamite Caves | II | | | | 10 October 2000 | TR2229735451; 51°04′31″N 1°10′19″E | | 1389102 | Upload Photo | Q26668544 |
| Road of Remembrance | II | | | | 24 October 2013 | TR2282935753; 51°04′40″N 1°10′47″E | | 1416272 | Upload Photo | Q26676505 |
| War Memorial to the Machine Gun Corps (Cavalry) | II | | | | 22 April 2020 | TR2135536485; 51°05′06″N 1°09′33″E | | 1469583 | Upload Photo | Q97457595 |

== See also ==
- Grade I listed buildings in Kent
- Grade II* listed buildings in Kent

== Sources ==
- Newman, John (2013) [1969], Kent: North-East and East, The Buildings of England, New Haven and London: Yale University Press, ISBN 978-0-300-18506-5
