= Thomas Henry Weist-Hill =

English violinist and conductor (1828 – 1891)

Thomas Henry Weist-Hill (3 January 1828 – 26 December 1891) was an English violinist, conductor and academic. He was the first principal of the Guildhall School of Music.

== Life ==
Weist-Hill was born in London, son of Thomas Hill, goldsmith and freeman of the city. He showed an early talent for the violin, and, after appearing at Gravesend as an infant prodigy, he entered in 1844 the Royal Academy of Music, where he studied under Prosper Sainton, and in 1845 took the King's Scholarship. He was subsequently a professor of the violin at the academy, and conducted its choir and orchestra. On leaving the institution he soon became known as a concert violinist, and was taken up first by Edward James Loder, and then by Louis-Antoine Jullien, with whom he toured in America. There he was the first to make known Mendelssohn's Violin Concerto, and he visited the principal continental cities.

Returning to London, he was engaged as first violin by Michael Costa, under whom he played for many years in the orchestras of the Philharmonic Society and the Sacred Harmonic Society. On the opening of the Alexandra Palace in 1873 he was appointed musical director, and in that capacity promoted new compositions by British composers, and revived forgotten works, such as Handel's Esther and Susanna. In 1878 he conducted the orchestral concerts of Jenny Viard-Louis, at which several important works were heard for the first time in England. He was appointed principal of the Guildhall School of Music in 1880, and held that post until his death in South Kensington on 26 December 1891. He was regarded as an admirable violinist and an able administrator. He wrote a few compositions, mostly for violin and cello, of which the "Pompadour Gavotte" became popular.
