= Elham =

Elham or Ilham may refer to:

- Elham (given name), list of people with the name
- Elham (surname), list of people with the surname
- Elham, Kent, England, a village
  - Elham railway station, served the village
  - Elham Deanery, Church of England, around the village
  - Elham Valley Railway, a former line between Canterbury and Folkestone
  - Elham Valley, a chalk valley containing the village

== See also ==
- Ilham & Wahi, a form of revelation in Islam
