= Canterbury South railway station =

Disused railway station in Kent, England

Canterbury South
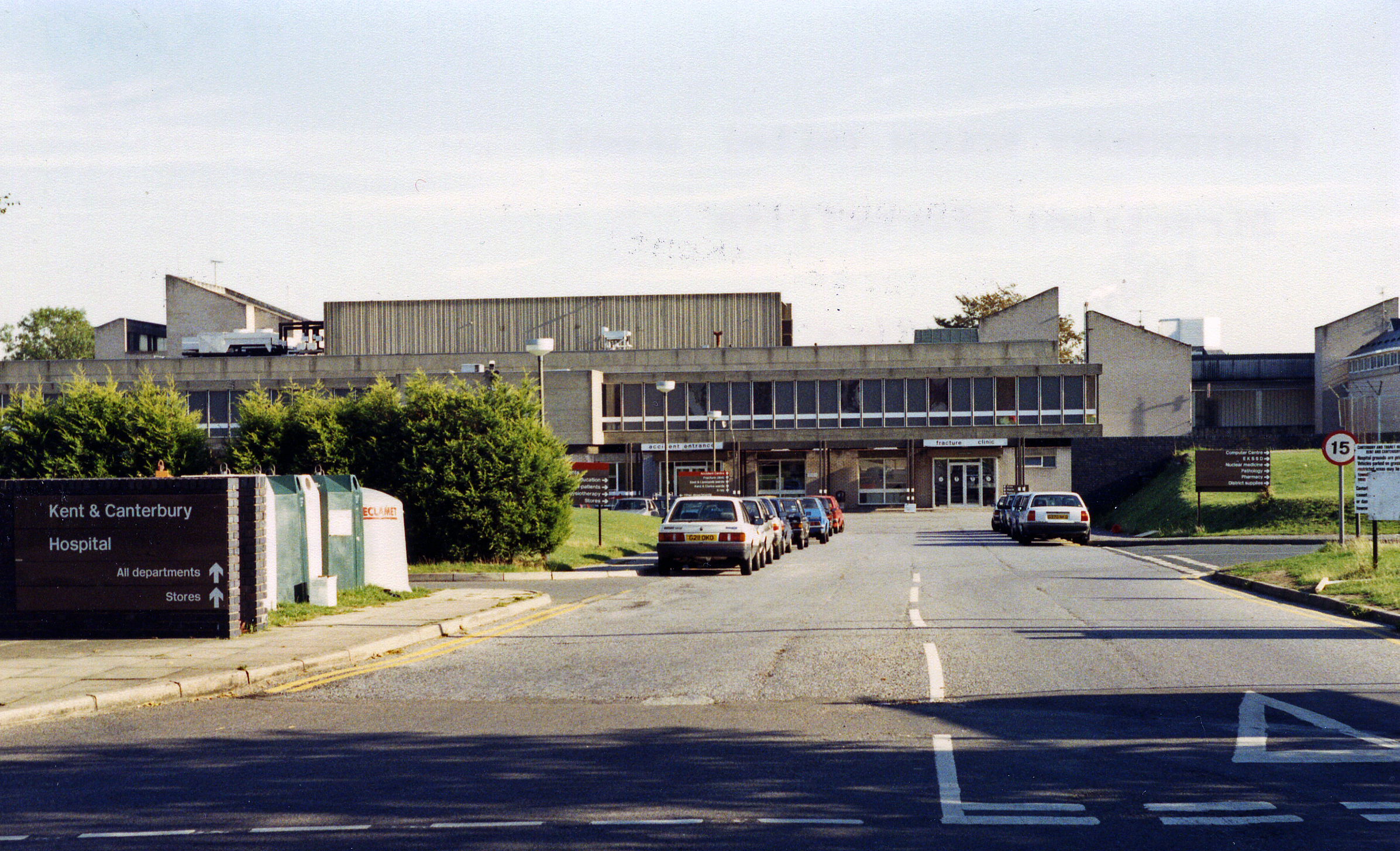
- The site of the former Canterbury South station in 1990.

General information
- Location: Canterbury, Kent; England
- Coordinates: 51°15′58″N 1°05′05″E
- Grid reference: TR 153 564
- Platforms: 2

Other information
- Status: Disused

History
- Pre-grouping: South Eastern Railway; South Eastern and Chatham Railway
- Post-grouping: Southern Railway

Key dates
- 1 July 1889: Opened
- 1 December 1940: Closed to passengers
- 1 October 1947: Closed to freight
Location

Canterbury South was a station on the Elham Valley Railway. It opened in 1889 and closed to passengers in 1940 and freight in 1947.

== History ==
The station opened on 1 July 1889. It was situated on the extension of the Elham Valley Railway from Barham to Harbledown Junction, on the Ashford to Ramsgate line. A 17-lever signal box was provided. Initially, there were six passenger trains per day. By 1906 there were nine trains a day, with five on Sunday. This had reduced to six trains a day by 1922. The double track between Lyminge and Harbledown Junction was reduced to single track from 25 October 1931 and the signal boxes between those points were abolished. Services had been reduced to five trains a day by 1937.

Passenger services between Canterbury West and Lyminge were withdrawn on 1 December 1940 and the line was placed under military control. The military established block posts at Canterbury South and Bishopsbourne, under the control of the Royal Corps of Signals. The station remained open to freight during the war. Military control was relinquished on 19 February 1945. The Elham Valley Railway closed on 1 October 1947.

The site of the station is now covered by the Kent and Canterbury Hospital.

Preceding station	Disused railways	Following station
Canterbury West	Southern Railway; Elham Valley Railway	Bridge
