= Cheriton =

Cheriton may refer to:

== Places ==
=== England ===
- Cheriton, Hampshire, a village and parish near Winchester
  - Battle of Cheriton, a battle in the English Civil War
- Cheriton, Kent, a one-time village, now a part of the urban area of Folkestone
  - Cheriton Halt railway station closed in 1947
  - Cheriton Hill, part of the Folkestone Downs
  - Cheriton Road, a football stadium that is the home ground of Folkestone Invicta
- Cheriton Bishop, a village on the northern borders of Dartmoor National Park
- Cheriton Fitzpaine, a village in Devon
- North Cheriton, a small village in South Somerset

=== Wales ===
- Cheriton, Pembrokeshire, a village also known as Stackpole Elidor
- Cheriton, Swansea, a village in the county of Swansea
- RAF Carew Cheriton, a World War II Royal Air Force airfield near Carew, Pembrokeshire

=== United States ===
- Cheriton, Virginia, a town in Northampton County

== People ==
- David Cheriton, Canadian computer scientist and billionaire
  - David R. Cheriton School of Computer Science, at the University of Waterloo
- John Cheriton (1828–1917), English-born Australian farmer and politician
- Odo of Cheriton (died 1247), English preacher and fabulist
- Shirley Cheriton (born 1955), British actress and performer

== Other uses ==
- HMS Cheriton, several ships
