= Bridge railway station =

Disused railway station in Kent

Bridge
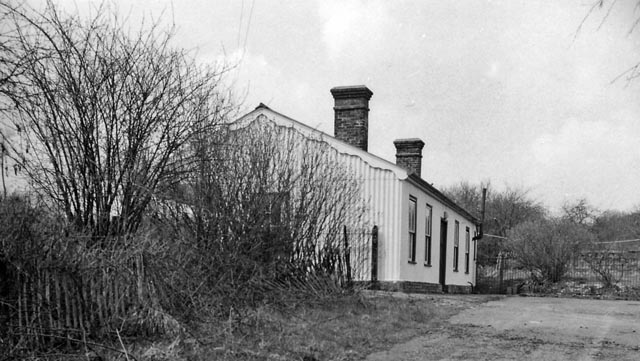
- Bridge station, 16 April 1963

General information
- Location: Bridge, Kent; England
- Coordinates: 51°14′47″N 1°06′39″E
- Grid reference: TR 172 543
- Platforms: 2

Other information
- Status: Disused (private residence)

History
- Pre-grouping: South Eastern Railway; South Eastern and Chatham Railway
- Post-grouping: Southern Railway

Key dates
- 1 July 1889: Opened
- 1 December 1940: Closed to passengers
- 1 October 1947: Closed to freight
Location

Bridge was a station on the Elham Valley Railway in the county of Kent, England. It opened in 1889 and closed to passengers in 1940 and freight in 1947.

== History ==
The station opened on 1 July 1889. It was situated on the extension of the Elham Valley Railway from Barham to Harbledown Junction, on the Ashford to Ramsgate line. An 18-lever signal box was provided. Initially, there were six passenger trains per day. By 1906 there were nine trains a day, with five on Sunday. This had reduced to six trains a day by 1922. The double track between Lyminge and Harbledown Junction was reduced to single track from 25 October 1931 and the signal boxes between those points were abolished. Services had been reduced to five trains a day by 1937.

Passenger services between Canterbury West and Lyminge were withdrawn on 1 December 1940 and the line was placed under military control. The station remained open to freight during the war. Military control was relinquished on 19 February 1945. The Elham Valley Railway closed on 1 October 1947. The station building was converted into a dwelling in 1948 and is now a private residence.

Preceding station	Disused railways	Following station
Canterbury South	Southern Railway; Elham Valley Railway	Bishopsbourne
