= Lyminge =

Village in Kent, England

Coordinates: 51.127°N 1.0876°E

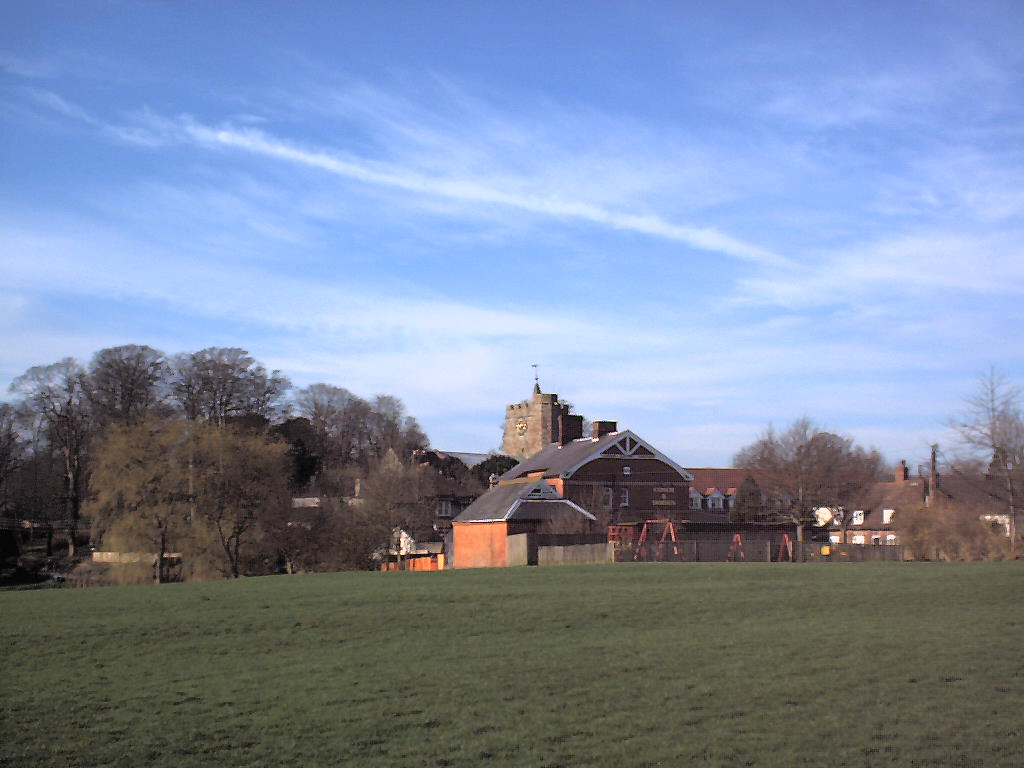
- Tayne Field with the Coach & Horses pub and the church in the background

- Location within Kent
- Population: 2,717 (2011)
- OS grid reference: TR 161 410
- District: Folkestone and Hythe
- Shire county: Kent
- Region: South East
- Country: England
- Sovereign state: United Kingdom
- Post town: Folkestone
- Postcode district: CT18
- Dialling code: 01303
- Police: Kent
- Fire: Kent
- Ambulance: South East Coast
- UK Parliament: Folkestone and Hythe

Lyminge /lɪmɪndʒ/ is a village and civil parish in southeast Kent, England. It lies about five miles (8 km) from Folkestone and the Channel Tunnel, on the road passing through the Elham Valley. At the 2011 Census the population of Etchinghill was included. The Nailbourne begins in the village and flows north through the valley, to become one of the tributaries of the Great Stour. The hamlet of Ottinge lies to the NE on the road to Elham. Lyminge is home to the Grade II* listed Sibton Park, now owned by the Holiday Property Bond but previously a school.

The village is surrounded by farmland and ancient forests. There is a wide variety of flora and fauna in the surrounding area, including badgers and various species of deer, along with wild boar, which are thought to have escaped from farms.

Lyminge was a royal centre of the Kingdom of Kent of Anglo-Saxon England and a church was founded in 633.

== Church ==
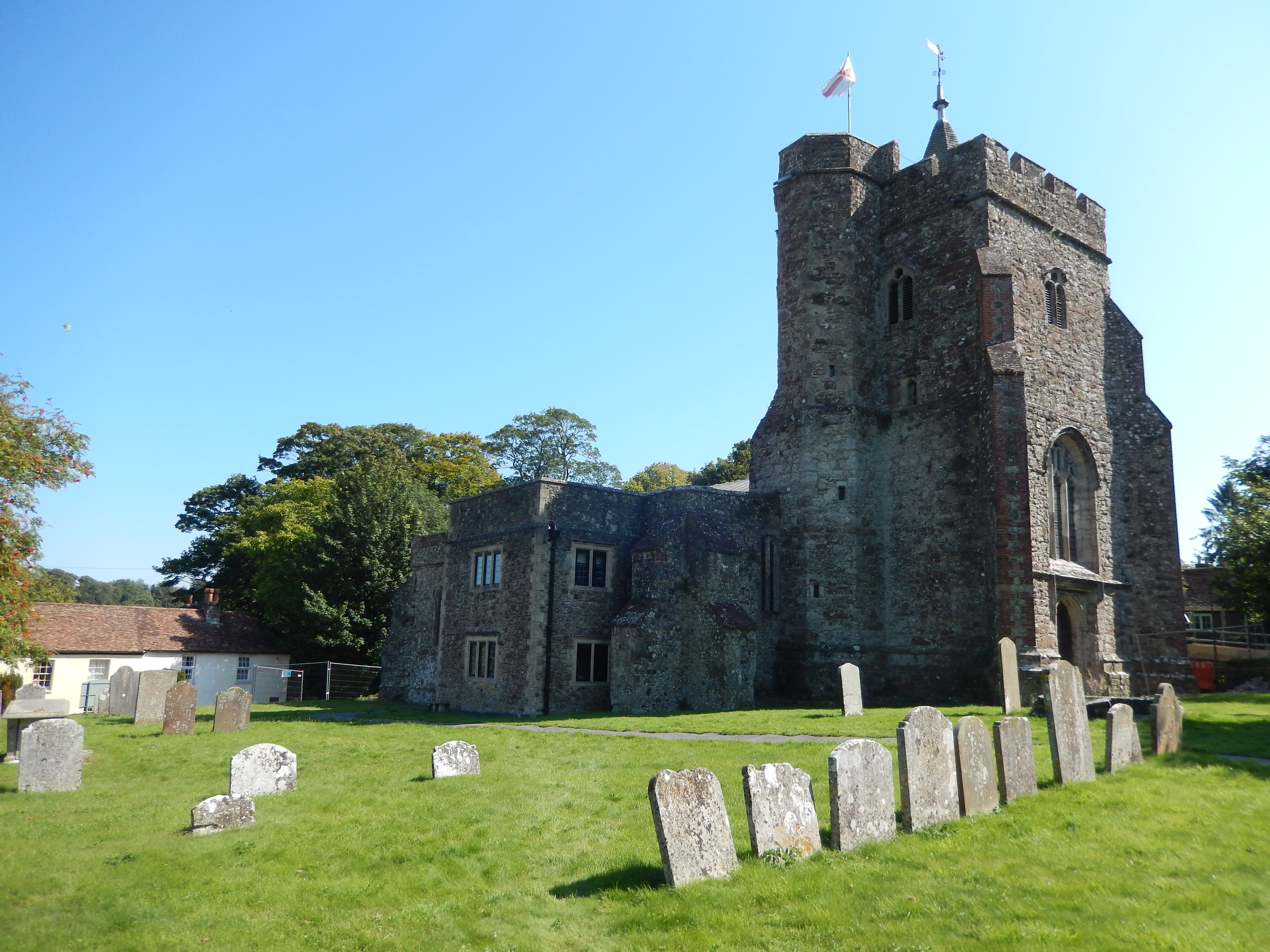
North side of the Church of St Mary and St Ethelburga

One of the oldest standing structures in the village is the Parish Church of St Mary and St Ethelburga, founded in 633. The current church building dates back to c. 965, with additions dating to the late 12th century, the 14th century and the early 16th century, and is a Grade I listed building.

Æthelburh of Kent (Ethelburga) was the daughter of the Christian King Æthelberht of Kent. She married King Edwin of Northumbria in 625, and his conversion was a condition of their marriage. After Edwin had been killed at the Battle of Hatfield Chase in 633 Ethelburga returned to Kent to become abbess of a new convent, Lyminge Abbey. When she died in 647 she was venerated as a saint.

In 2019 an archaeological excavation at the church uncovered the remains of the original Anglo-Saxon church, founded by Queen Ethelburga in 633, by the south porch of the current church. The church was first uncovered during the second half of the 19th century by Canon Robert Jenkins (1815–1896), rector of Lyminge from 1854 until his death. The remains show an apsidal chancel separated from the nave by a triple arch with two central columns. The mortar used in the walls of the Saxon church is a distinctive pink since it was made from crushed Roman bricks, which indicates that stonemasons from continental Europe were involved in the construction of the church. A number of graves were uncovered in the chancel of the Saxon church during the 2019 excavations but they are believed to postdate the demolition of the church during the late 11th or early 12th century. Part of a porticus has been uncovered on the north side of the apse, which may have been where Queen Ethelburga was originally buried, although it is recorded that her remains were moved to Canterbury at a later date.

== Archaeology ==
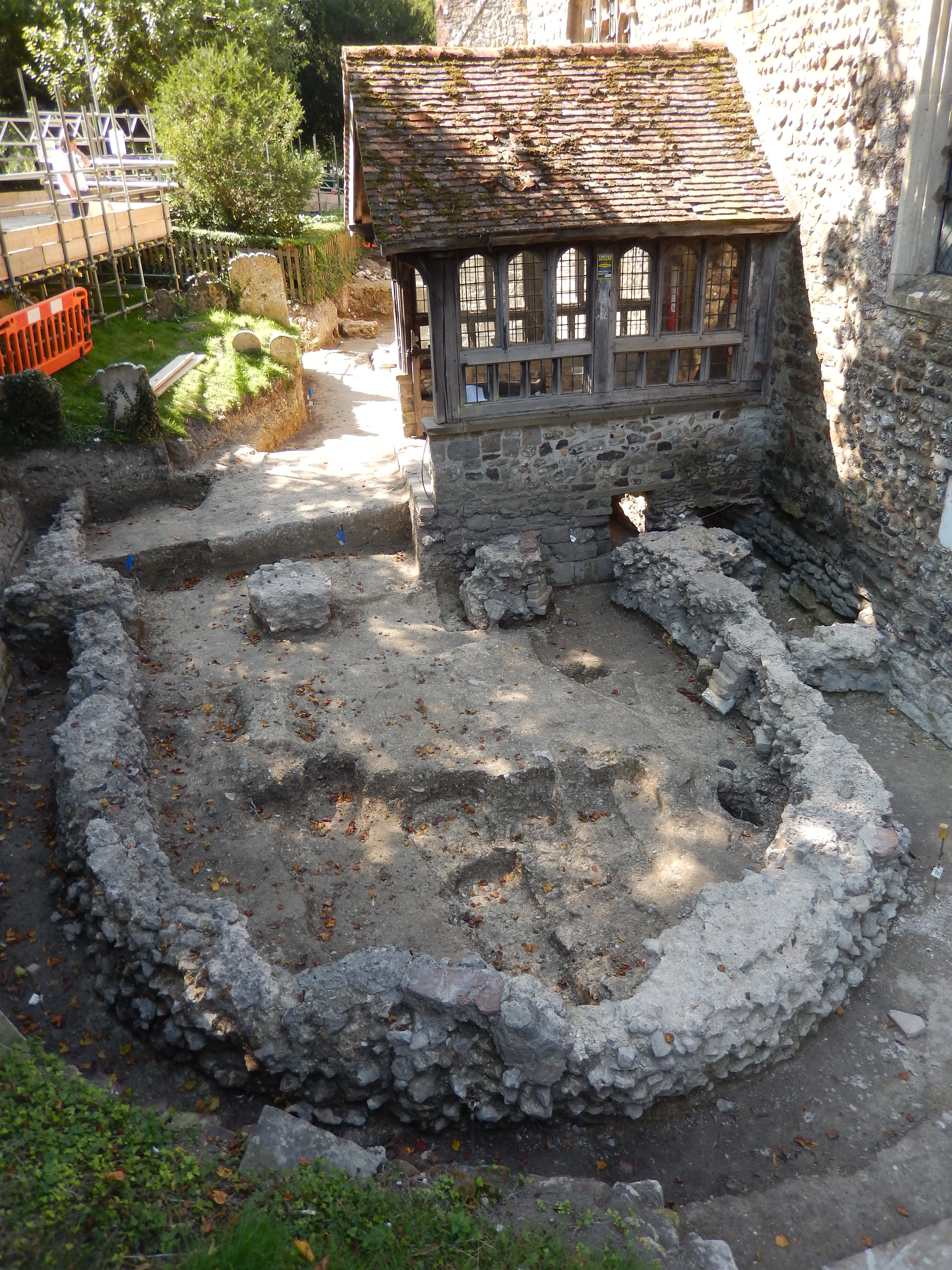
Saxon church founded by Æthelburh of Kent in 633, excavated in 2019

Lyminge has been a focus of archaeological work for more than a half a century. In December 1953 two inhumations were discovered by workmen working for farming contractors and subsequent excavations led by Alan Warhurst resulted in the discovery of a 6th-century Jutish cemetery (grid reference TR 1638 4169) containing 44 graves. The grave assemblages were remarkable, although not unusual for the period, and contained a lot of high-status jewellery, weapons such as spear-heads, swords and shield bosses and some rare glass claw beakers of exceptional quality and condition.

There was a major archaeological find in October 2012 when the foundations of an Anglo-Saxon feasting hall were excavated on the village green by a team from the University of Reading, led by Gabor Thomas, working with local archaeologists and villagers and funded by the Arts and Humanities Research Council. Guided by a ground-penetrating radar survey the hall was identified as measuring 21 metres by 8.5 metres (71 × 28 feet) and would have been large enough to hold at least 60 people. A decorated and gilded horse harness, broken in antiquity, was found in the foundations together with pieces of jewellery, bone combs and a well-preserved manicure set: three little bronze rods, probably for cleaning fingernails or ears, strung on a piece of wire. The site also yielded quantities of glass, some evidently scavenged from nearby Roman sites and melted down to make glass-bead jewellery.

== Sport ==
Lyminge is home to Sibton Park Cricket Club, which plays in Division 1 of the Kent Cricket League and has an active Junior Section for boys and girls from a wide area in and around Lyminge.

== Transport ==
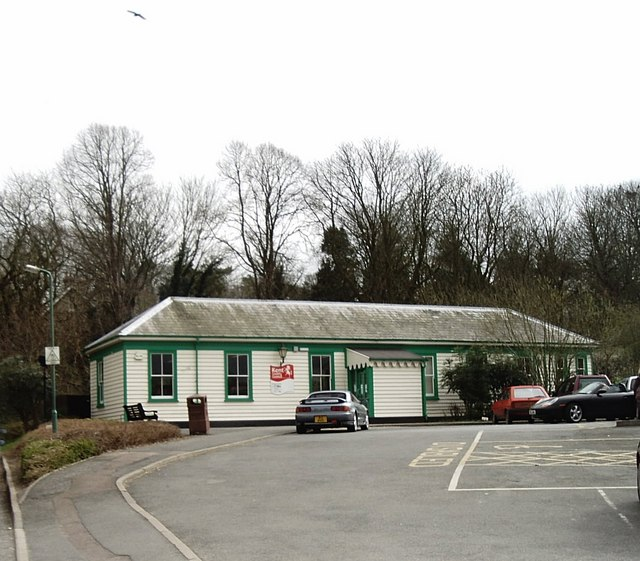
Former Lyminge Station

The Elham Valley Railway ran from Canterbury to Folkestone through the village from 1887 until closing in 1947. The station building exists today as the library, situated in The Sidings, off Station Road.

The Stagecoach bus route 17 serves the village and connects it to Folkestone and Canterbury. There is typically one bus an hour in each direction on weekdays and Saturdays and one every two hours in each direction on Sundays. In addition, Route 18 links the village to Canterbury via Bossingham, and Hythe Kent. Bus runs Monday to Saturday only at irregular intervals. (Stagecoach in East Kent timetable).
