= Ellam =

Ellam is a surname. Notable people with the surname include:

- Michael Ellam (born 1968), British civil servant and former banker
- Roy Ellam (1943–2026), English footballer

== See also ==
- Elham (disambiguation)
  - Elham (surname)
- Ellams, another surname
