= BL 18-inch railway howitzer =

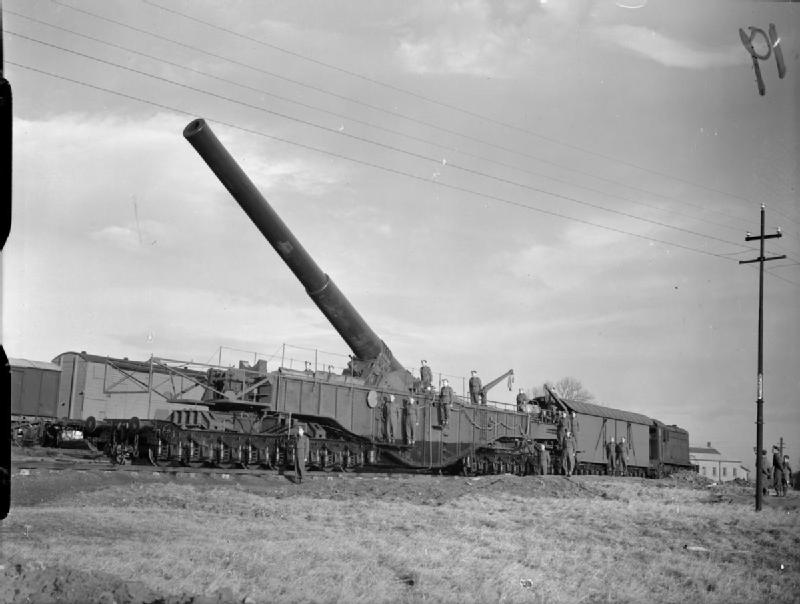
- Example at Catterick, 12 December 1940
- Type: Railway howitzer
- Place of origin: United Kingdom

Service history
- In service: 1920–1945
- Used by: United Kingdom
- Wars: World War II

Production history
- Manufacturer: Elswick Ordnance Company
- No. built: 5

Specifications
- Mass: 85.7 tons (barrel & breech)
- Barrel length: Bore: 52 ft (16 m) (34.7 calibres)
- Shell: HE; 2,500 lb (1,134 kg)
- Calibre: 18-inch (457.2 mm)
- Elevation: 0° - 40°
- Traverse: 2° L & R
- Muzzle velocity: 1,880 ft/s (570 m/s)
- Effective firing range: 22,300 yd (20,400 m)

The BL 18-inch railway howitzer (formally Ordnance BL 18-inch Mk I howitzer on truck, railway) was a British railway gun developed during World War I. Part of the progression of ever-larger howitzers on the Western Front, it did not enter service until 1920.

== History ==
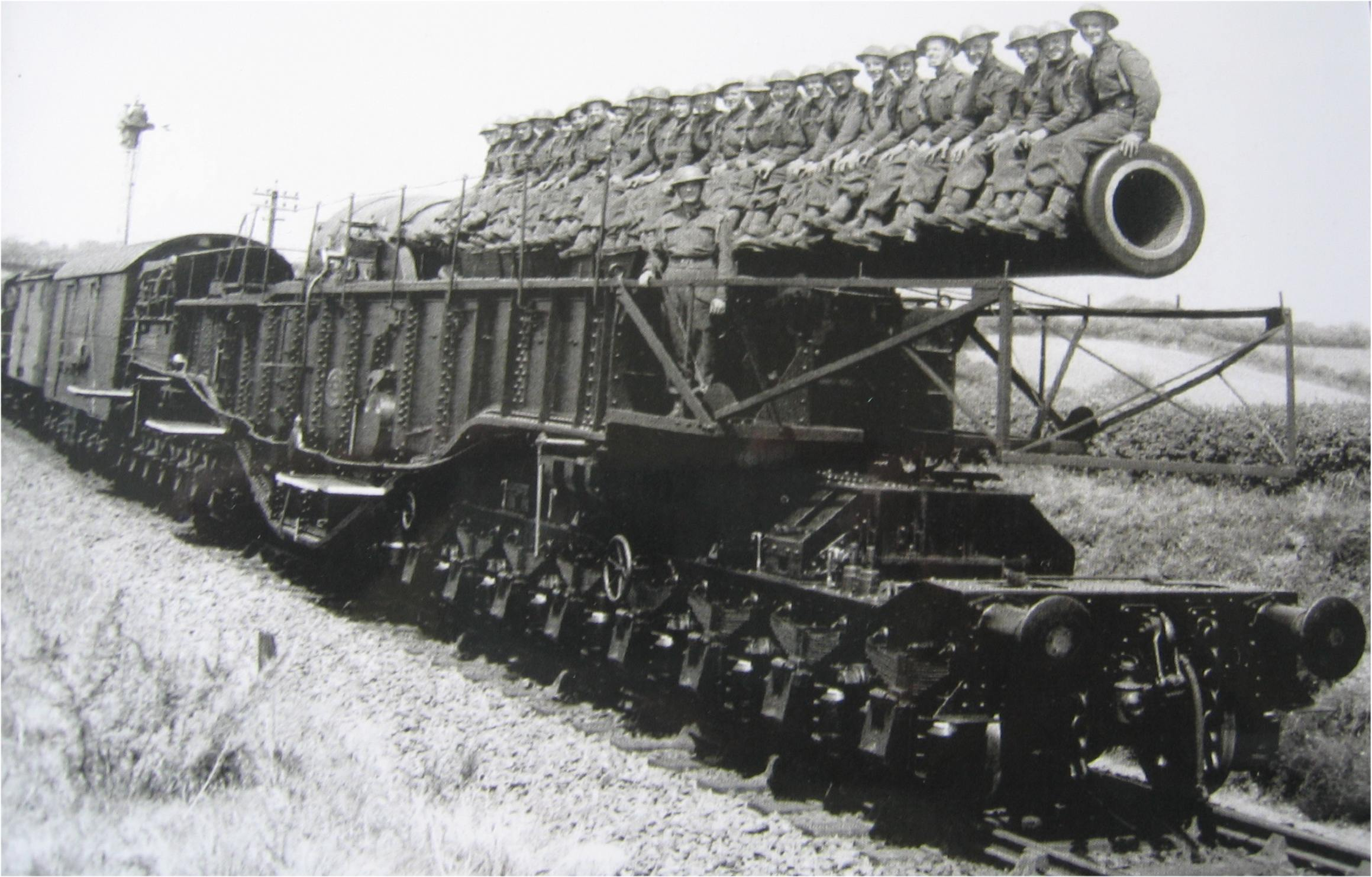
"Boche Buster's" crew posing with the gun

Five guns and two complete equipments on railway wagons were produced. After World War I, there was no use for such large but relatively short-ranged weapons and they were placed in storage. In World War II, the two wagons were used to mount 13.5-inch guns, which were capable of engaging targets on the German-occupied Channel coast of France. In late 1940, one 18-inch howitzer was mounted on the railway mounting nicknamed "Boche Buster", which had been used in World War I to carry a 14-inch gun.

== Deployment to Kent, 1940 ==
In 1940, there were concerns that an enemy invasion was imminent, crossing the English Channel from France. Three heavy rail-mounted guns were deployed on the Elham Valley Railway line in Kent. The railway route followed a meandering course, enabling the guns to be trained by moving them along the line to a suitable location. The wooded landscape also gave cover for the guns.

The heaviest gun was stationed at Bourne Park, where there was a short tunnel; the gun could be stood down in the tunnel, avoiding enemy attack. The other two guns were deployed to Elham railway station. The guns remained in the area for the greater part of the hostilities.

The howitzer gun at Bourne, the so-called "Boche Buster", had a barrel of 18 inches diameter and was, apart from a ponderous and unreliable Russian siege cannon, the largest railway gun in Europe (note that Schwerer Gustav did not enter service until 1941; so, in 1940, the 18 inch was the biggest). It originally had a 14-inch barrel during World War I, and the last action in which it fired was in 1916, when three rounds completely destroyed the railway station at Arras in France. The gun was then stored at Nottingham until early in 1940, when the authorities realised the potential of the weapon for military defence.

It was fitted with an 18-inch naval barrel at the Darlington railway works in the spring of 1940. The barrel was one of several that had been removed from British battleships following the Washington Naval Treaty in 1922, which banned very large naval guns.

It was manned by 50 men and several specialist gunnery officers from the 2nd Regiment of the Royal Artillery. The complete battery, including Royal Engineers to work the railway locomotives and supervise track work, numbered 80 men and was known as the 11th Super Heavy Battery. After initial training at Catterick Camp in the summer and autumn of 1940, the 11th Super Heavy Battery, under the command of Major Boyle, moved to Kent in early January 1941. For the journey, the gun was disguised as three banana wagons by the skilful use of steel hoops and canvas. At 250 tons all up, the gun was far in excess of the weight limit of Elham railway, and considerable strengthening works were carried out. It arrived at Bishopsbourne in February, and arrangements were made to store it in the tunnel at Bourne Park. This originally had two tracks, but had been reduced to a single track as an economy measure before the war. To allow through trains to pass while the gun was there, the second track was reinstated. The shells were 6 ft 7 in (2.01 m) high, each weighing 1 1/4 long tons (1,300 kg); transferring them was a long and arduous job despite the use of special hoists. At Bishopsbourne station itself, arrangements were made to allow mess and sleeping coaches to be shunted into the siding.

The gun was first fired, for calibration tests, on the morning of 13 February 1941, when the equipment was towed to a stretch of track near the Black Robin public house, Kingston. Several rounds were fired out into mid-channel, the results of which were sighted and marked by observation posts on the cliffs at Dover. In the Kingston and Barham area, villagers were warned to open doors and windows, but the blasts were so severe that in many cases houses were damaged. The gun was fired on only two other occasions, shortly after the first; one at the World's Wonder bridge between Barham and Elham and the other at Lickpot bridge, Elham.

The railway track had to be altered whenever the gun was run out for firing. At the places where the army decided the gun was most likely to be used in countering an invasion threat, the track was strengthened and the sleeper spacing reduced. The recoil on firing made the gun run back 20 ft (6.1 m), and even then tended to distort the track. A 200-yard spur railway line was laid into the fields, just north of Kingston village, in order to allow the gun to train on the beaches at Sandwich Bay and Pegwell Bay, as well as the Straits of Dover and the English Channel approaches.

On 20 June 1941, the "Boche Buster" was inspected by Winston Churchill at Bishopsbourne station, and later that day the Prime Minister viewed the smaller guns at Elham.

In 1944, the army decided that all the guns would be more useful in the Allies' drive towards Germany and they were taken to Salisbury Plain for testing prior to the invasion of Normandy.

== Preservation ==
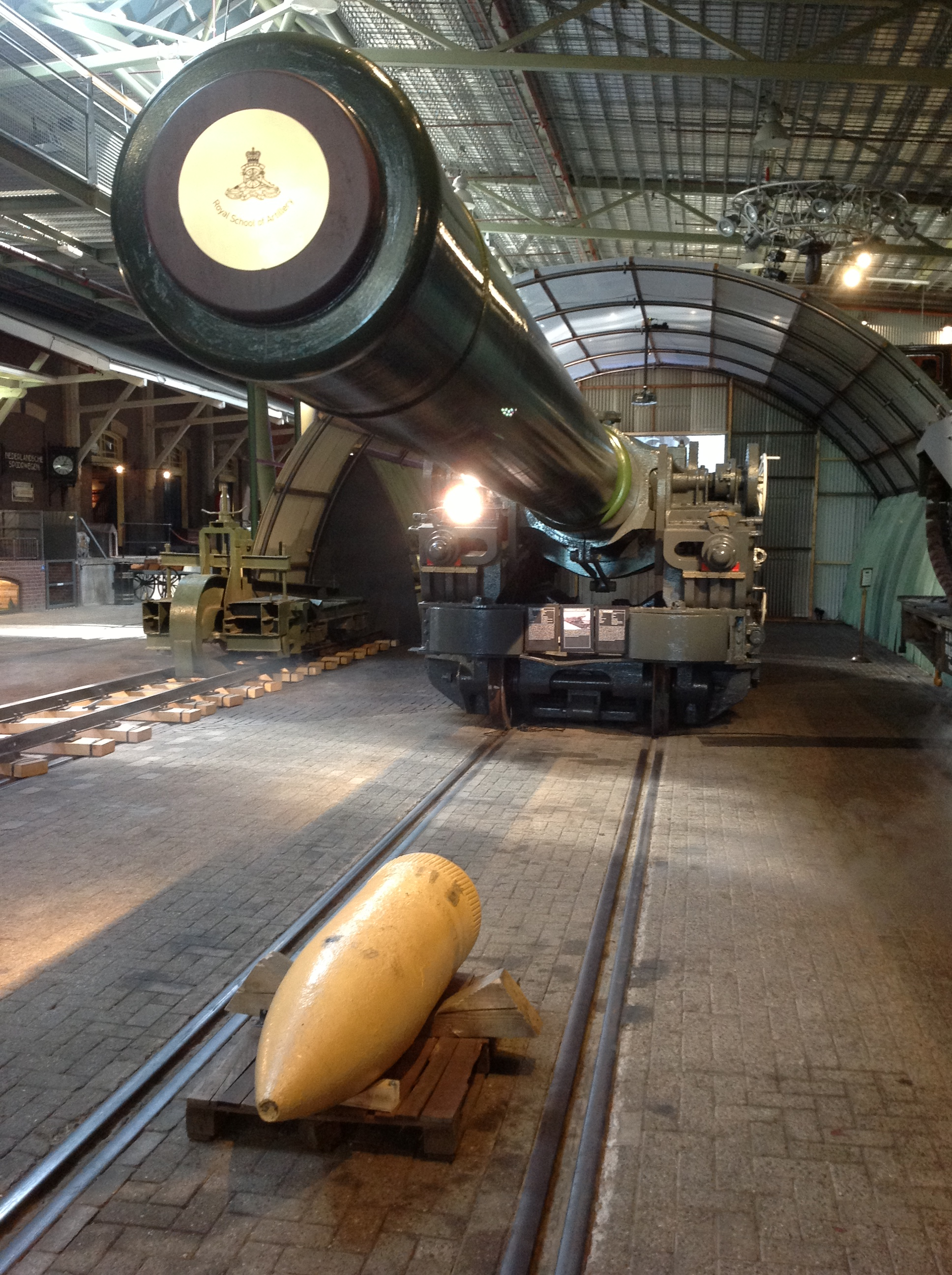
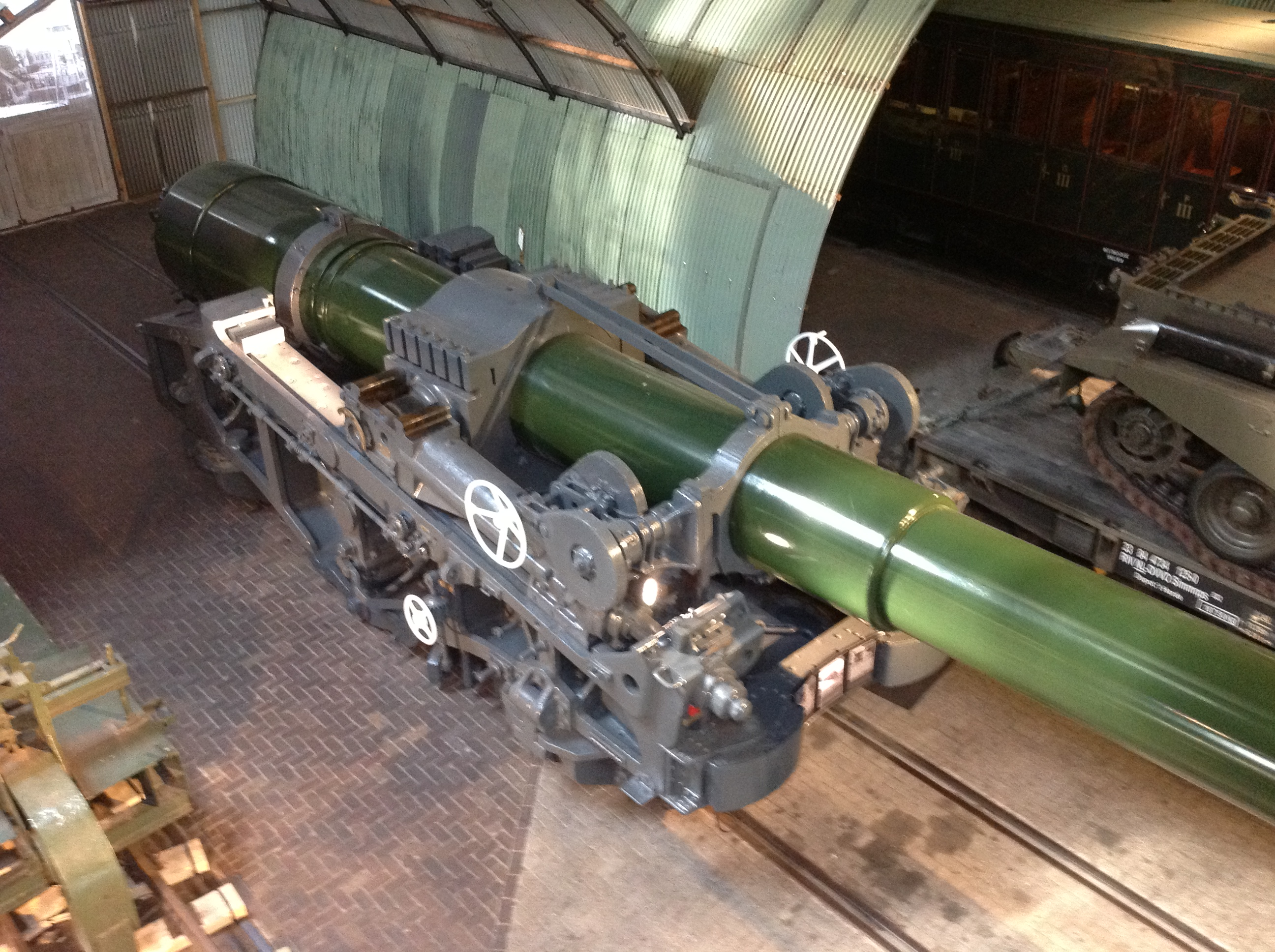
The 18-inch "barrel number one" on display at the Dutch Railway Museum in 2013.

The four BL 18-inch railway howitzers that were deployed during the Second World War were all scrapped in the post-war period.

Only the gun from the fifth howitzer, named "barrel number one", survives, it was used for artillery testing at MoD Shoeburyness in 1920 before being put into storage at the Royal Arsenal at Woolwich. In 1940, it was returned to Shoeburyness to be used again for experimental firings. Post war, it continued to be used until 1959. Its final series of tests was firing experimental 1,000 lb (450 kg) cannon shells using much reduced charges.

After decades in storage, the barrel was put on public display at Larkhill, when the Royal Artillery relocated there in 2008 with the closure of its Woolwich Barracks. In March 2013, it was loaned to the Spoorwegmuseum, the Dutch national rail museum.

In September 2013, it was moved back to the Royal Armouries artillery museum at Fort Nelson, Hampshire. It is mounted on a proofing carriage, a gun carriage with very limited elevation and traverse intended for test firing.

== See also ==
- List of railway artillery

== Bibliography ==
- Barton, Keith; Buxton, Ian L. & Williams, A. G. (2001). "Question 35/00: British 18-inch Guns". Warship International. XXXVIII (3). International Naval Research Organization: 249–250. ISSN 0043-0374.
- Dale Clarke, British Artillery 1914–1919. Heavy Artillery. Osprey Publishing, Oxford UK, 2005 ISBN 1-84176-788-3
- I.V. Hogg & L.F. Thurston, British Artillery Weapons & Ammunition 1914–1918. London: Ian Allan, 1972.
