= Bishopsbourne railway station =

Former railway station in Kent, England

Bishopsbourne
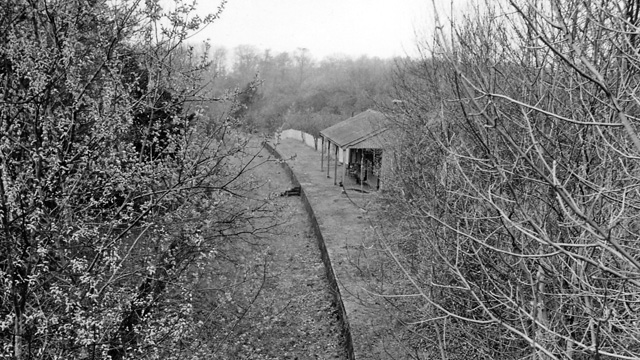
- Bishopsbourne station, 16 April 1963

General information
- Location: Bishopsbourne, Kent; England
- Coordinates: 51°13′44″N 1°07′41″E
- Grid reference: TR 185 524
- Platforms: 2

Other information
- Status: Disused

History
- Pre-grouping: South Eastern Railway; South Eastern and Chatham Railway
- Post-grouping: Southern Railway

Key dates
- 1 July 1889: Opened
- 1 December 1940: Closed to passengers
- 1 October 1947: Closed to freight
Location

Bishopsbourne was a station on the Elham Valley Railway. It opened in 1889 and closed to passengers in 1940 and freight in 1947.

== History ==
The station opened on 1 July 1889. It was situated on the extension of the Elham Valley Railway from Barham to Harbledown Junction, on the Ashford to Ramsgate line. A 16-lever signal box was provided. Initially, there were six passenger trains per day. By 1906 there were nine trains a day, with five on Sunday. This had reduced to six trains a day by 1922. The double track between Lyminge and Harbledown Junction was reduced to single track from 25 October 1931 and the signal boxes between those points were abolished. Services had been reduced to five trains a day by 1937.

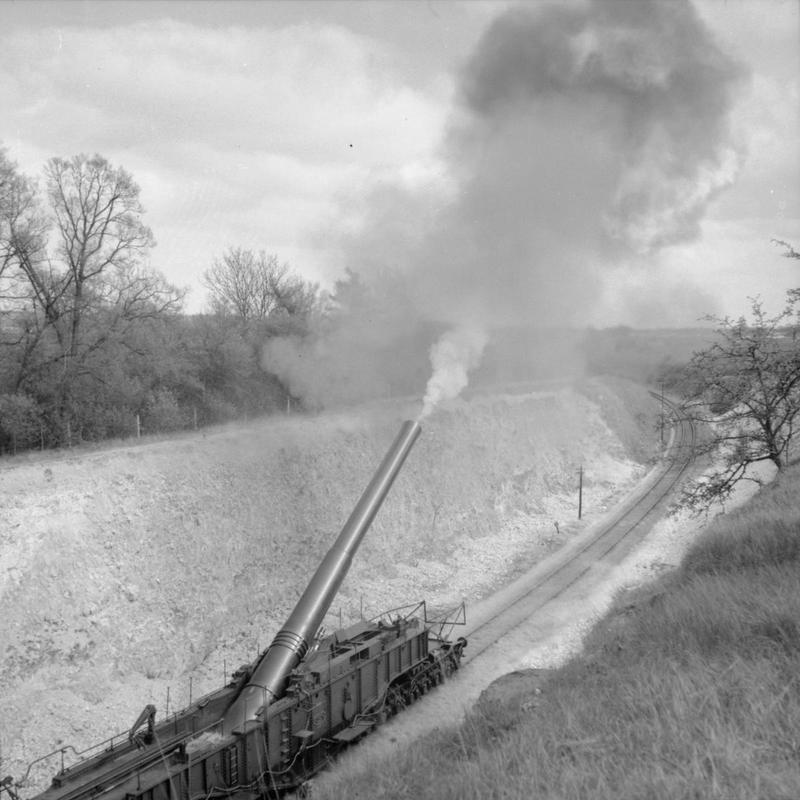
The Boche Buster firing near Bishopsbourne on 7 May 1941.

Passenger services between Canterbury West and Lyminge were withdrawn on 1 December 1940 and the line was placed under military control. The military established block posts at Canterbury South and Bishopbourne, under the control of the Royal Corps of Signals. The station remained open to freight during the war. A passing loop was installed in Bourne Tunnel, 3/4 mile (1.21 km) south of Bishopsbourne on which was kept a BL 18-inch railway howitzer, nicknamed the "Boche Buster". It had a range of 50 miles (80 km). A curved siding was constructed at Charlton Park, south of Bishopsbourne from which the gun was fired. Military control was relinquished on 19 February 1945. The War Department ground frames and points were decommissioned on 2 May 1946. The Elham Valley Railway closed on 1 October 1947. After closure the station has been converted to a private house.

Preceding station	Disused railways	Following station
Bridge	Southern Railway; Elham Valley Railway	Barham
