= Wingmore =

Village in Kent, England

Coordinates: 51.1763°N 1.1291°E

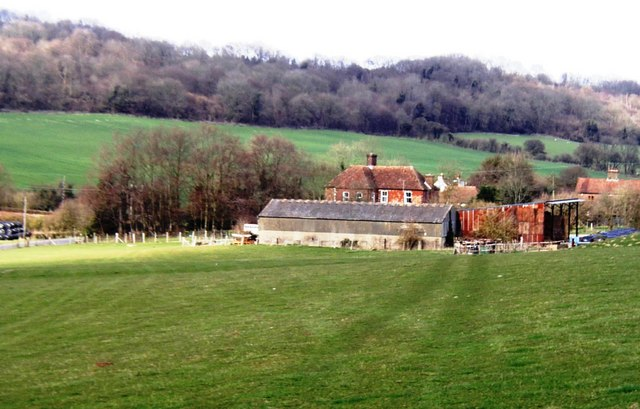
- Wingmore Court Farm

- Location within Kent
- District: Folkestone and Hythe
- Shire county: Kent
- Region: South East
- Country: England
- Sovereign state: United Kingdom
- Post town: Canterbury
- Postcode district: CT4
- Police: Kent
- Fire: Kent
- Ambulance: South East Coast
- UK Parliament: Folkestone and Hythe

Wingmore is a small village between Canterbury and Folkestone in Kent, England. It is situated in the Elham Valley approximately halfway between the larger villages of Elham and Barham on the B2065. It consists of a few cottages and farms. The population at the 2011 Census was included in the civil parish of Elham

Wingmore has had a few car accidents in recent years with an average of one to two a year. This has mainly been due to speeding through the small village.
