= Ellams =

Ellams is a surname. Notable people with the surname include:

- Inua Ellams (born 1984), British poet, playwright and performer
- Lloyd Ellams (born 1991), British footballer

== See also ==
- Ellam, another surname
