= Elham Valley =

Valley in Kent, England

Coordinates: 51°09′10″N 1°06′40″E

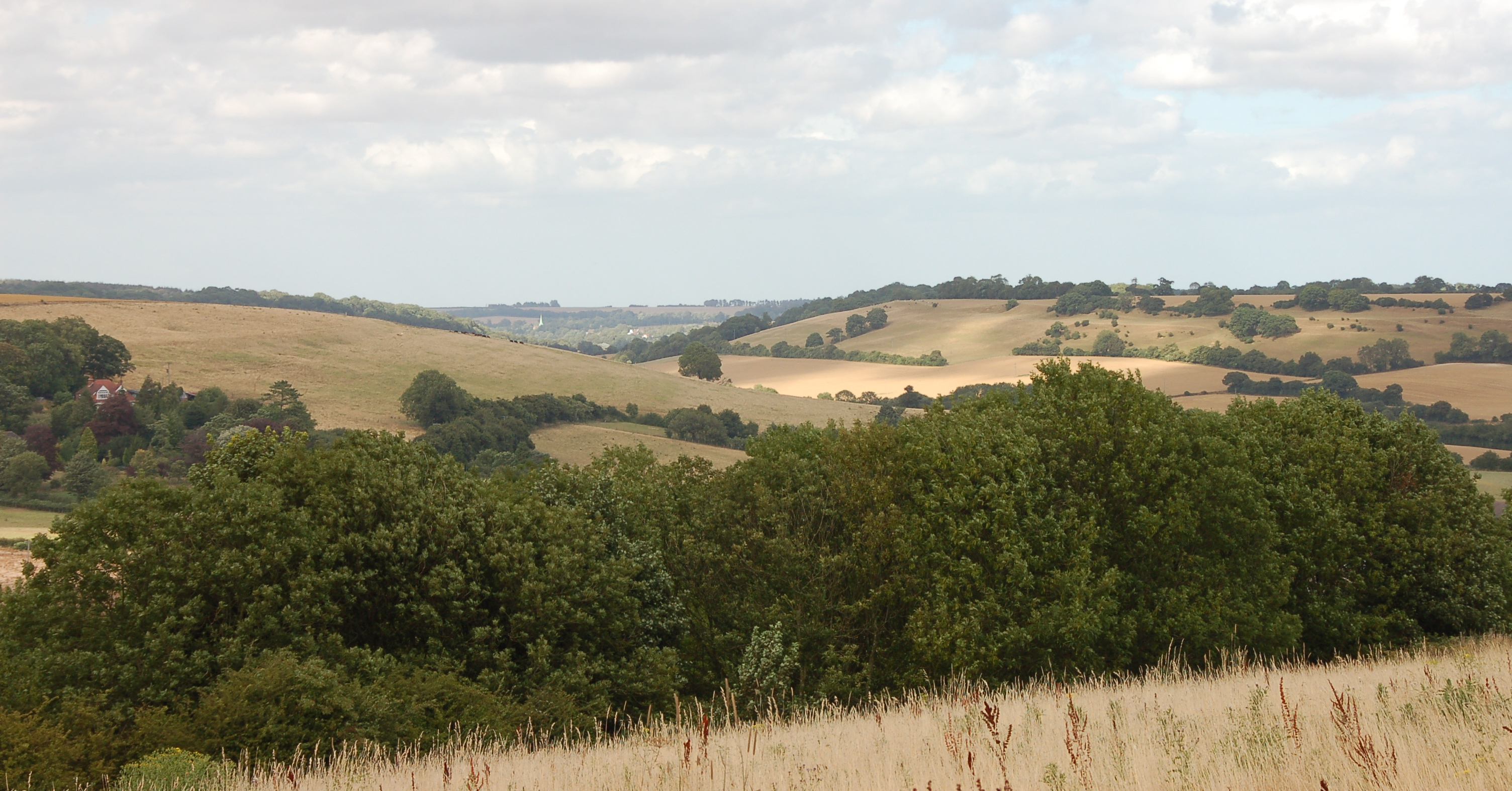
The Elham Valley with Barham Church spire in the distance.

The Elham Valley is a chalk valley carved by the River Nailbourne situated in the North Downs in East Kent. The valley is named after the settlement of Elham. Other settlements in the valley include Etchinghill, Lyminge, Barham, Kingston, Bishopsbourne and Bridge.

Located in the upper slopes of the valley are a number of examples of unimproved chalk downland such as Baldock Downs and Park Gate Down. At Bishopsbourne and North Lyminge there are examples of traditional sheep-grazed pasture and water meadow.

== Elham Valley Way ==
The Elham Valley Way, a 22.5-mile (40 km) recreational walking route passes through the valley. The route starts at Hythe and finishes at Canterbury Cathedral. It utilises much of the erstwhile route of the Elham Valley Railway, constructed in the 19th century and connecting Folkestone and Canterbury. This was closed in 1947, although a railway museum is located at Peene, immediately north of the Channel Tunnel station.
