= Etchinghill, Kent =

Village in Kent, England

Coordinates: 51.113°N 1.095°E

Etchinghill
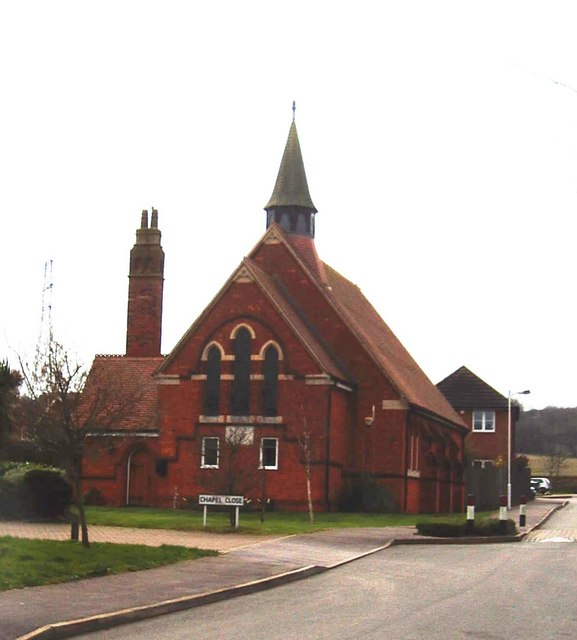
- A converted chapel in Etchinghill

- Location within Kent
- Civil parish: Lyminge
- District: Folkestone and Hythe
- Shire county: Kent
- Region: South East
- Country: England
- Sovereign state: United Kingdom
- Post town: FOLKESTONE
- Postcode district: CT18
- Dialling code: 01303
- Police: Kent
- Fire: Kent
- Ambulance: South East Coast
- UK Parliament: Folkestone and Hythe

Etchinghill is a village in the civil parish of Lyminge, in the Folkestone and Hythe district, in Kent, England, about 5 km north of Hythe, and 1 km north of the Channel Tunnel terminal at Cheriton, near Folkestone.

The village has a standard golf course noted for its hills, as well as a pub restaurant called The Gatekeeper which claims to be the closest pub to the Channel Tunnel. Village facilities include a basketball court, two football goals, and a village hall. A large BT Group communication mast, which was used as a telecommunication relay during the Cold War, still stands in the village.

== History ==
The hamlet of Etchinghill lies at the southern end of the Parish of Lyminge. Its original name was Tettinghelde in 1240 (Tetta's slope). A spring rises to the north side of Westfield Lane, (the road to Tolsford Hill) and the resultant stream flows across the fields to join up with the Nailbourne that rises in Well Field, Lyminge. This stream is known as the East Brook and probably in the Saxon period, when the settlement got its name of Tetinghelde, the volume of water would have been much greater. By the 15th century the hamlet's name had altered to “Etynghyld” and “Etynghyll”.

It was later known as Eachendhill or Etchinghole before settling to become Etchinghill. For centuries the hamlet remained a small farming community around the crossroads, one of which led to Dover; one going south to Hythe and north to the village of Lyminge where the church is; the track up Westfield Lane over Tolsford Hill led people to West Hythe no doubt, but the importance of this waned as the coastline altered; and a final lane (now vanished) led to Newington.

Over the years the hamlet has grown with additional development on all four of the roads leading from the crossroads, the establishment of a cricket club and, more recently, the creation of a golf course spreading across the land which separates Etchinghill from Lyminge.

== Railway ==
To the northeast of the village are the remains of the Elham Valley Railway, characterised by steep-sided cuttings and tunnels. The line which ran from Canterbury to the port of Folkestone, was closed in 1947 and dismantled between 1950 and 1954. The line is crossed by Teddars Leas Road (bridge) and Badger's Bridge as well as the Golf Course.

Although there was no station in Etchinghill, villagers could catch the train by travelling to the neighbouring village of Lyminge, approximately 2 miles to the north via road or one of the many public footpaths.

== Transmission tower ==
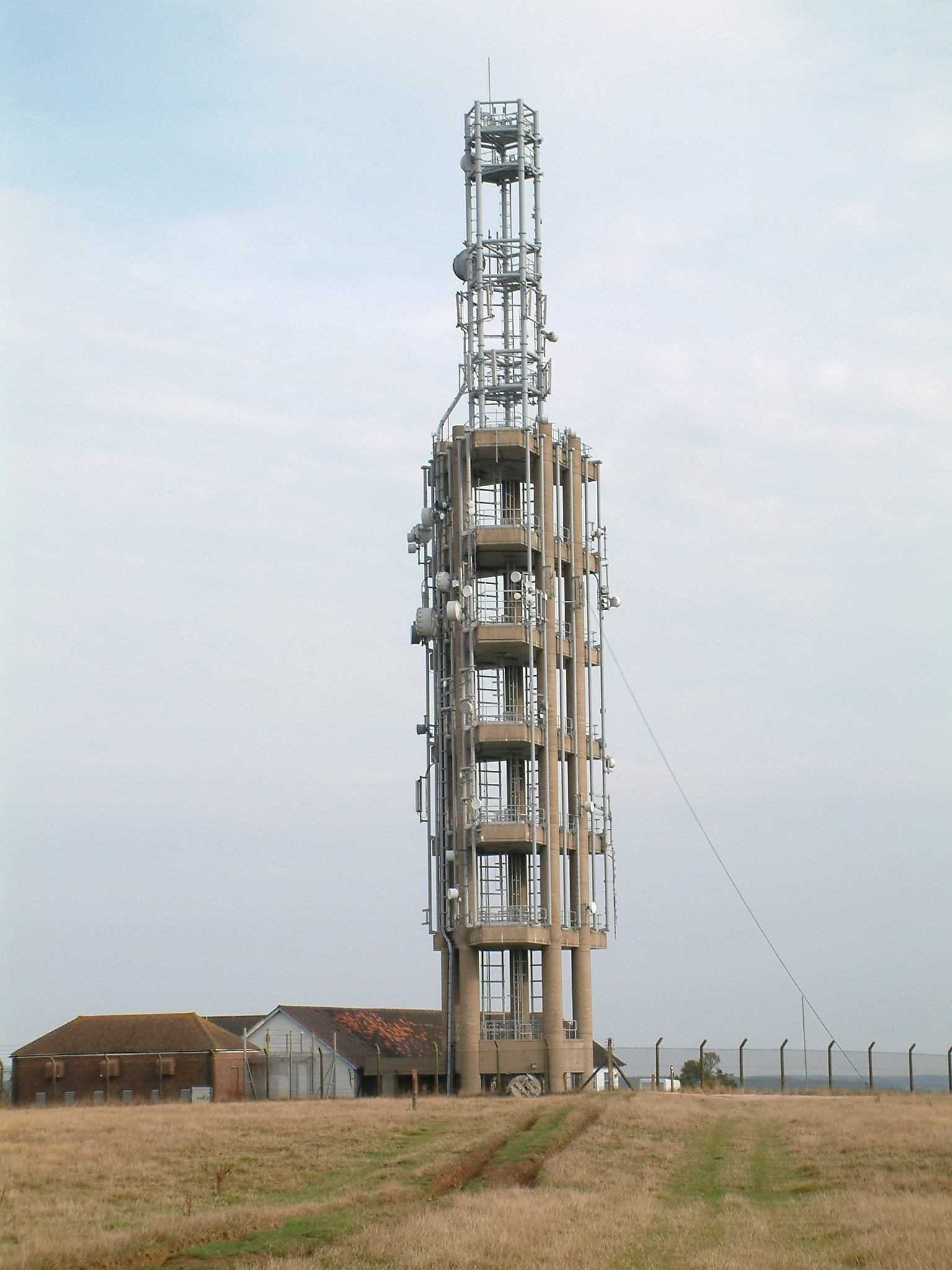
The BT Tower in September 2009

The 210-ft concrete mast carried the Eurovision transmission, across to Fiennes, Pas-de-Calais in northern France. On the 585 ft Tolsford Hill, transmissions started in July 1959, over the English Channel to another tower at Fiennes. In 1972 there was a £200,000 plan to build a new tower, to provide 3,600 more circuits. Tolsford Hill BT Tower was built by 1975.

== St Mary's Hospital ==
Until the early 1990s, the village was dominated by St Mary's Hospital. This was constructed in 1836 by the Elham Poor Law Union as the workhouse for the surrounding area, including the towns of Folkestone and Hythe. Prior to this each parish had relieved the poor the best way they could, usually by allowing them to remain in their own homes and giving them outdoor relief, although Elham and Newington each had a small local workhouse facility. In 1834 Parliament passed the Poor Law Amendment Act and suggested parishes might group together and provide cross-community facilities. This led to the foundation of the Elham Poor Law Union in 1835, and the building of the workhouse at Etchinghill in 1836 at a cost of £6,500.

Designed by architect Sir Francis Head, the workhouse was designed to accommodate 300 inmates. In 1841 an additional building had been erected to provide food and temporary accommodation to some of the many vagrants who wandered the countryside. Despite its large size, it was considerably extended in 1890, with the addition of new dormitory wards, an infirmary, and a chapel.

Following the closure of the workhouse in 1947, the buildings passed to the National Health Service, and were re-opened as St Mary's Hospital, specialising in geriatric care. There was also a hospital annexe providing isolation facilities for patients with highly infectious diseases. The hospital was helped by community volunteers who included hospital visitors (who befriended patients), the local St. John Ambulance (who provided qualified auxiliary nurses for routine nursing and bed making duties throughout the 1980s), and a very active League of Friends (who raised money to provide many additional comforts for the residents), active from 1962 until the hospital's closure.

St Mary's hospital was closed in 1990 and all the buildings, with the exception of the un-consecrated chapel, were demolished. 52 houses now occupy approximately two thirds of the land, with a new village hall and amenity land for all to enjoy taking up the remainder of the land. The hospital chapel, the last remaining physical element, has been converted into a private house.
