= Sibton Park Cricket Club =

Coordinates: 51.133°N 1.0866°E

== Brief history ==
In 1897 Captain John Howard bought Sibton Park House and its surrounding estate. He was the owner of Chartham Paper Mills and a Member of Parliament. Records show that cricket was played on this ground in the 1880s but the club was formed under the patronage of John Howard in 1903. Cricket has been played continuously since then with the exception of the periods during the two World Wars. In the 1930s, cricket weeks were held at the Park, marquees erected and this became very much a part of the social life of the village and the surrounding area.

=== Development ===
After the second World War the club slowly developed though funds and resources were scarce. The skills of the club members were put to good use in improving the ground and pavilion facilities. A small wooden pavilion with no electricity, mains water or mains drainage progressed to a purpose-built brick pavilion.

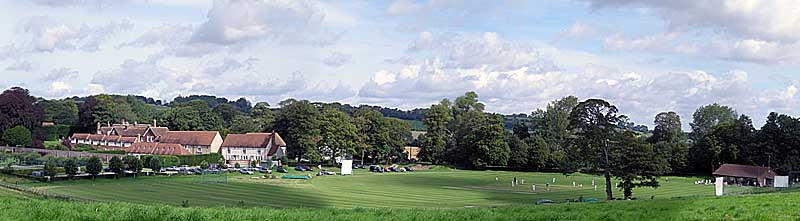

=== Cricket ===
In the 1960s it was decided that the club could field an occasional and XI. A little later a Colts section was started (the first in the Folkestone and Hythe area). The club fields two Saturday and two Sunday sides with mid-week cricket and Junior cricket in several age groups. The 1st XI has just gained promotion to the 1st Division of the Kent League and the second XI was promoted to the 2nd Division in 2003.

== Development ==
In 1998 a new net practice facility was built with two full-sized double nets (with help from the National Lottery). The winter of 2000/2001 saw the ground and pavilion under several feet of water for six months. The pavilion was re-furbished and cricket was played on the late May Bank Holiday. The following autumn a comprehensive drainage and pumping system was installed to prevent flooding happening again. In 2003 the club celebrated its centenary with a Cricket week which included a game against the MCC.

In 2004, the club became the first sports club in Folkestone and Hythe and only third cricket club in Kent to be awarded the ECB and Sport England Clubmark and in 2006 became one of the county's first Focus Clubs. In 2007 the ground was extended to accommodate a larger Junior section and a new Girls' section.
