= Ottinge =

Hamlet in Kent, England

Coordinates: 51.137°N 1.101°E

- Location within Kent
- District: Folkestone and Hythe
- Shire county: Kent
- Region: South East
- Country: England
- Sovereign state: United Kingdom
- Post town: Canterbury
- Postcode district: CT4 6
- Police: Kent
- Fire: Kent
- Ambulance: South East Coast
- UK Parliament: Folkestone and Hythe

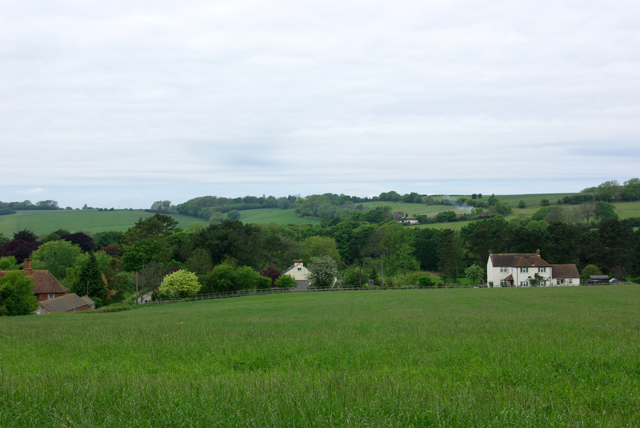
View towards Ottinge

Ottinge is a hamlet in Kent, England, which is located NNW of Folkestone. It lies less than one mile (1 km) from the village of Lyminge and occupies a site at a crossroads between that village and Elham (where, at the 2011 Census, the population was included).
