= HMS Cheriton =

HMS Cheriton may refer to:

- English ship Cheriton (1656), a 20-gun ship launched in 1656, renamed Speedwell in 1660 and wrecked in 1676
- HMS Cheriton (1956), renamed Ashton and broken up in 1977
