= Cheriton Halt railway station =

Disused railway station in Kent

Coordinates: 51.08647°N 1.14139°E

Cheriton Halt

General information
- Location: Cheriton, Folkestone & Hythe; England
- Grid reference: TR201366
- Platforms: 2

Other information
- Status: Disused

History
- Pre-grouping: South Eastern and Chatham Railway
- Post-grouping: Southern Railway

Key dates
- 1 May 1908: Opened
- 1 December 1915: Closed
- 14 June 1920: Reopened
- 1 February 1941: Closed
- 7 October 1946: Reopened
- 16 June 1947: Closed
Location

Cheriton Halt is a disused railway station on the South Eastern Main Line which served the village of Cheriton on the outskirts of Folkestone in Kent, England. The station opened in 1908 and finally closed in 1947.

== History ==
The South Eastern and Chatham Railway opened a new halt at the growing village of Cheriton on 1 May 1908, 0.5 miles (0.80 km) away from Shorncliffe station, later Folkestone West. The station, comprising two wooden platforms, was perched on the embankment just to the east of the underbridge on the B2063 Risborough Lane. Each platform was equipped with basic facilities: a ticket hut and waiting shelter, running-in boards and a row of gas lamps kept by the resident haltkeeper. The station was served solely by Elham Valley Railway trains and closed as a wartime economy measure during both wars, before closing definitively with the rest of the Elham Valley Railway in 1947.

Preceding station	Disused railways	Following station
Lyminge	Southern Railway; Elham Valley Railway	Shorncliffe
