= Barham railway station =

Disused railway station in Barham, Kent

Barham
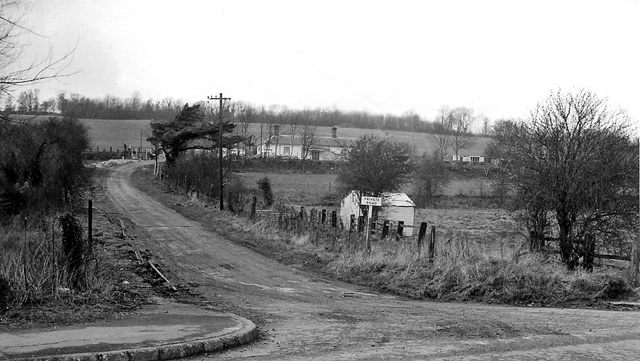
- Remains of Barham station, 16 April 1963

General information
- Location: Barham, Kent; England
- Coordinates: 51°12′14″N 1°09′17″E
- Grid reference: TR 204 496
- Platforms: 2

Other information
- Status: Disused

History
- Pre-grouping: South Eastern Railway; South Eastern and Chatham Railway
- Post-grouping: Southern Railway

Key dates
- 4 July 1887: Opened
- 1 December 1940: Closed to passengers
- 1 October 1947: Closed to freight
Location

Barham was a station on the Elham Valley Railway. It opened in 1887 and closed to passengers in 1940 and freight in 1947.

== History ==
The station opened on 4 July 1887 with the opening of the Elham Valley Railway from Cheriton Junction, on the South Eastern Main Line as far as Barham. An 18-lever signal box was provided. A public siding was located at Wingmore, 2 miles (3.2 km) south of Barham. Initially, there were six passenger trains per day. By 1906 there were nine trains a day, with five on Sunday. This had reduced to six trains a day by 1922. The double track between Lyminge and Harbledown Junction was reduced to single track from 25 October 1931 and the signal boxes between those points were abolished. Services had been reduced to five trains a day by 1937.

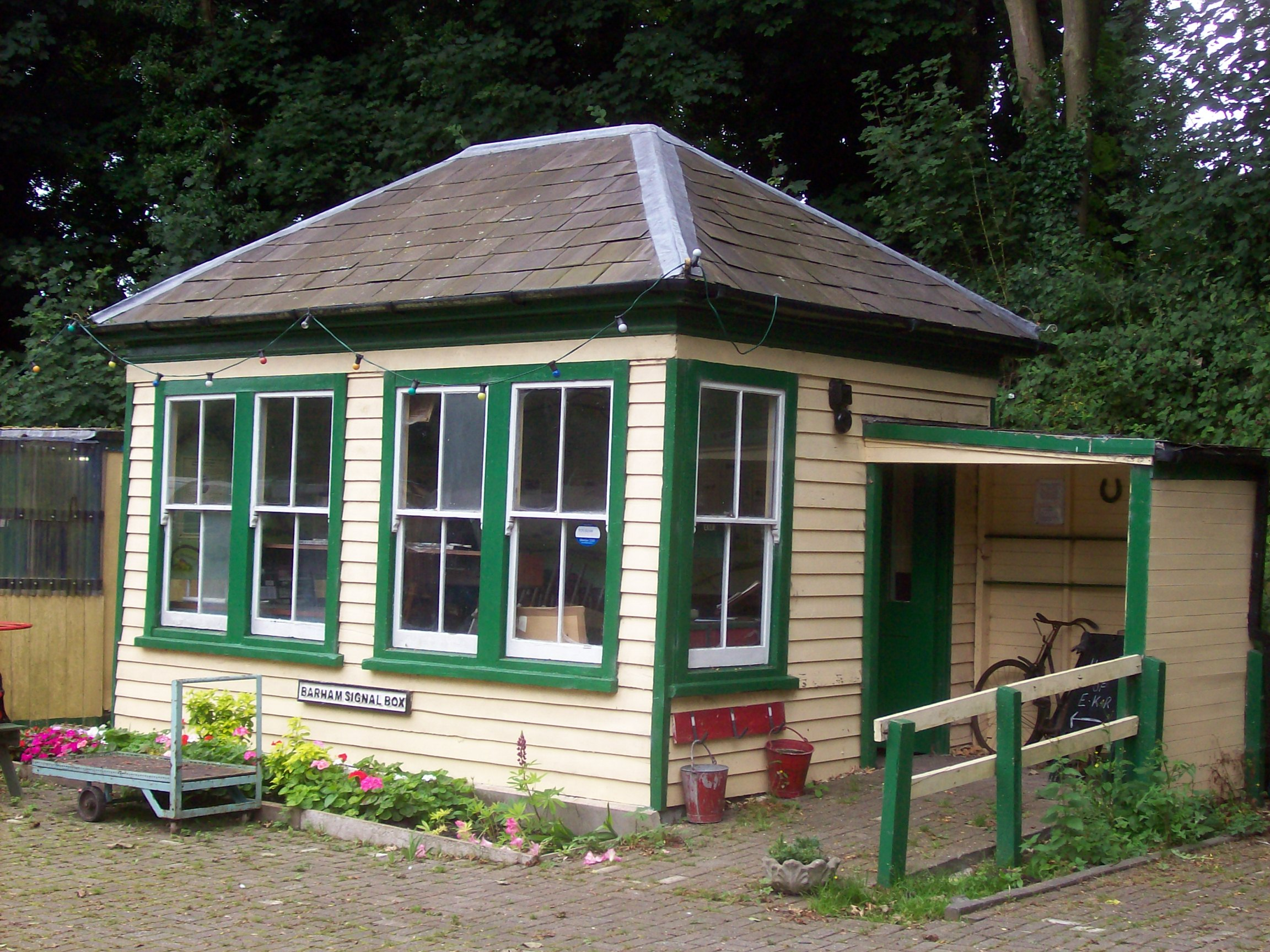
Barham Signal Box, as preserved at the East Kent Railway.

Passenger services between Canterbury West and Lyminge were withdrawn on 1 December 1940 and the line was placed under military control. On 31 October 1941, a fireman was killed on the footplate near Barham during an air raid. The station remained open to freight during the war. Military control was relinquished on 19 February 1945. The Elham Valley Railway closed on 1 October 1947. The station building at Barham was demolished in November 1963. Barham Signal Box is preserved at Shepherdswell, on the East Kent Railway.

Preceding station	Disused railways	Following station
Bishopsbourne	Southern Railway; Elham Valley Railway	Elham
