= Elham railway station =

Disused railway station in Kent

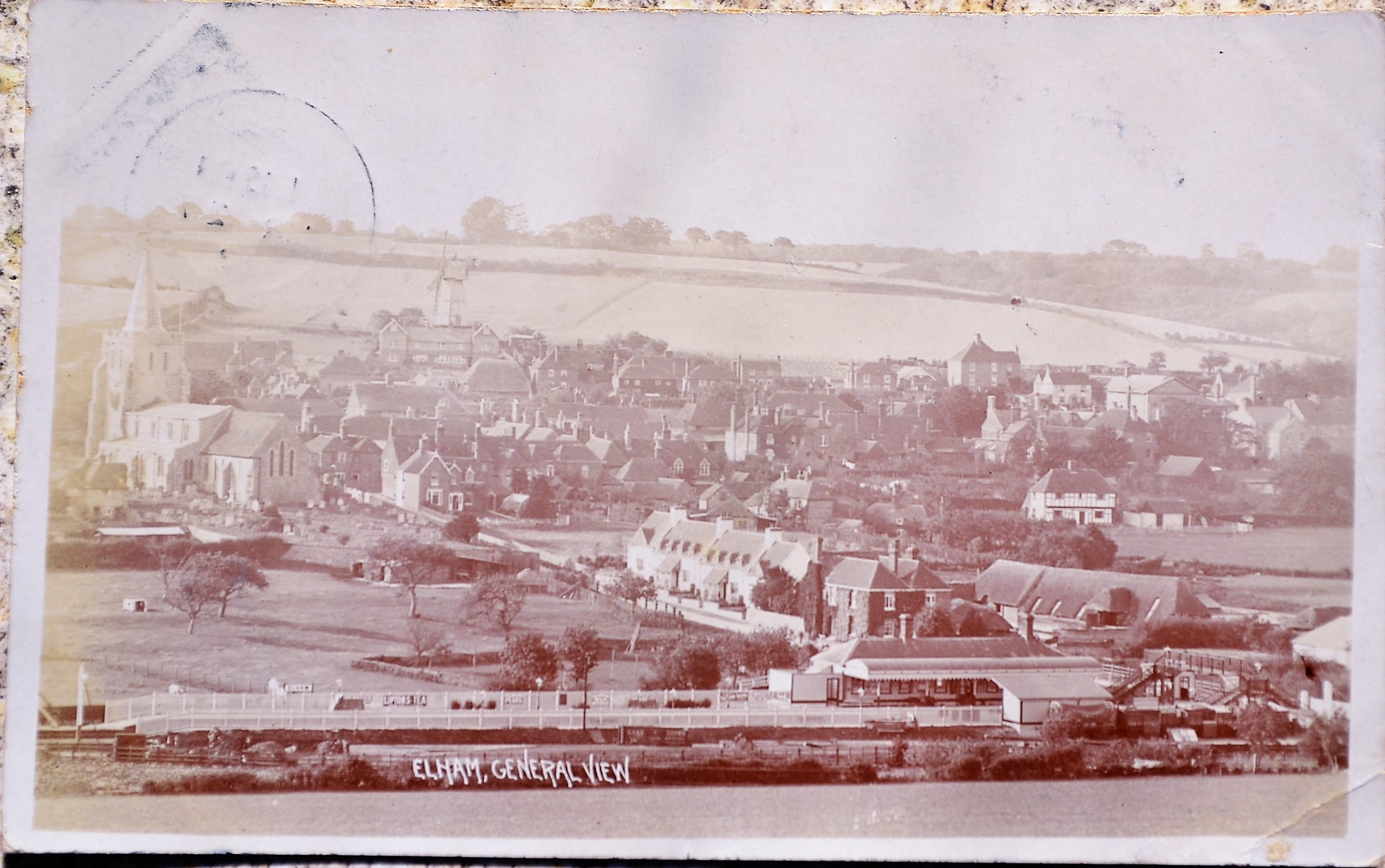
- General view of Elham in 1912. Station in foreground.

General information
- Location: Elham, Folkestone & Hythe; England
- Coordinates: 51°09′06″N 1°06′54″E
- Grid reference: TR 1795 4376
- Platforms: 2 (1 from 1931)

Other information
- Status: Disused

History
- Pre-grouping: South Eastern Railway; South Eastern and Chatham Railway
- Post-grouping: Southern Railway

Key dates
- 4 July 1887: Opened
- 1 December 1940: closed for regular passenger trains
- 1 October 1947: Line completely closed
Location

Elham railway station is a disused railway station on the Elham Valley Railway which served the village of Elham in Kent and the surrounding villages. Situated to the east of Elham the clapboard station was opened in 1887 and closed completely in 1947.

== History ==
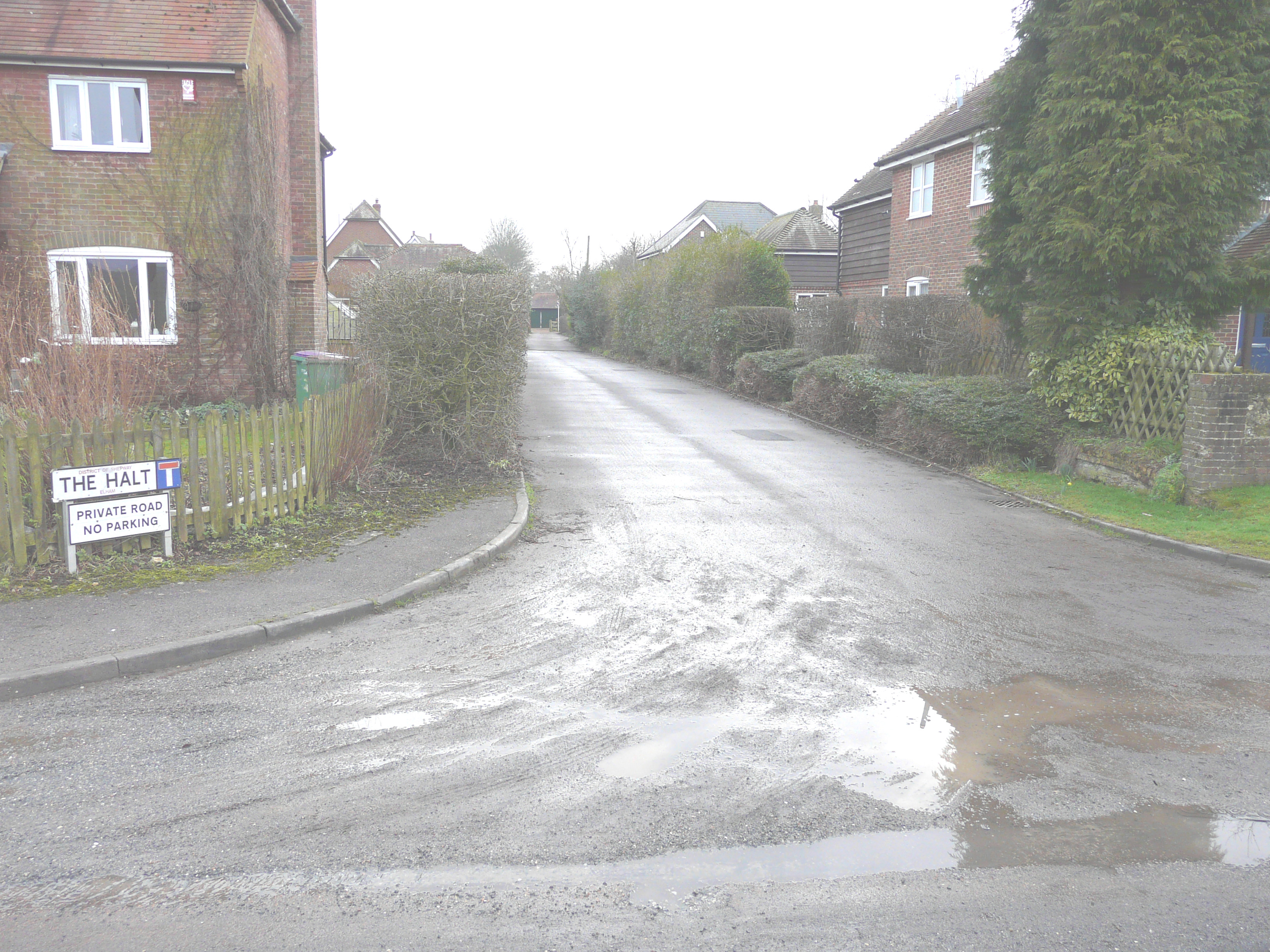
The site of the station in 2015

The station opened on 4 July 1887 with the opening of the Elham Valley Railway from Cheriton Junction, on the South Eastern Main Line as far as Barham. A public siding was located at Ottinge, just over 1 mile (1.6 km) south of Elham. It was controlled by a ground frame. Initially, there were six passenger trains per day. By 1906 there were nine trains a day, with five on Sunday. Between 1912 and 1916, a summer only railmotor service provided an additional four trains a day between Dover Priory and Elham. The service had been reduced to eight trains a day by 1922 and five trains a day by 1937. In 1931 the line was singled and one platform was closed.

Passenger services between Canterbury West and Lyminge were withdrawn on 1 December 1940 and the line was placed under military control. Two rail-mounted 12-inch howitzers were stationed at Elham during the war. The track had to be strengthened to cope with the recoil when the guns were fired. The station remained open to freight during the war. Military control was relinquished on 19 February 1945. In 1946 the line was reopened for goods traffic but a year later this service ceased and the Elham Valley Railway closed on 1 October 1947. The station building was demolished in 1964. After closure the station building was demolished but one platform still exists forming a retaining wall of a garden for a house now built on the station site.

Preceding station	Disused railways	Following station
Barham	Southern Railway; Elham Valley Railway	Lyminge
