= Lyminge railway station =

Disused railway station in Kent

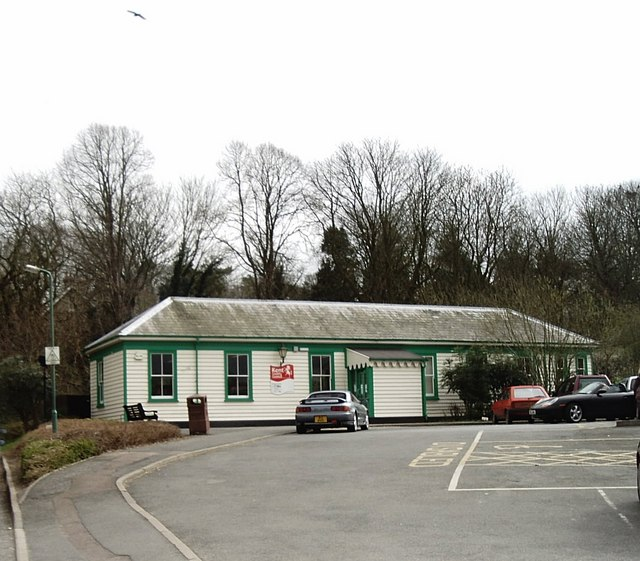
- Lyminge station, now serving as a library.

General information
- Location: Elham, Folkestone & Hythe; England
- Coordinates: 51°07′39″N 1°05′33″E
- Grid reference: TR 164 409
- Platforms: 2 (1 from 1931)

Other information
- Status: Disused

History
- Pre-grouping: South Eastern Railway; South Eastern and Chatham Railway
- Post-grouping: Southern Railway

Key dates
- 4 July 1887: Opened
- 3 May 1943: closed for regular passenger trains
- 7 October 1946: Re-opened to passengers
- 16 June 1947: Closed to passengers
- 1 October 1947: Closed
Location

Lyminge was a station on the Elham Valley Railway serving the village of the same name. It opened in 1887 and finally closed to passengers and freight in 1947.

== History ==
The station opened on 4 July 1887 with the opening of the Elham Valley Railway from Cheriton Junction, on the South Eastern Main Line as far as Barham. A 21-lever signal box was provided. Initially, there were six passenger trains per day. By 1906 there were nine trains a day, with five on Sunday. Between 1912 and 1916, a summer only railmotor service provided an additional four trains a day between Dover Priory and Elham. The service had been reduced to eight trains a day by 1922. The line north of Lyminge was reduced to five trains a day by 1937. The double track north of Lyminge was reduced to single track from 25 October 1931. The signal box was closed on 1 May 1937 as a cost-cutting measure. It was replaced by a ground frame located in the station building.

Passenger services between Canterbury West and Lyminge were withdrawn on 1 December 1940 and the line between Harbledown Junction and Lyminge was placed under military control. Passenger services to Folkestone continued until withdrawn on 3 May 1943. The station remained open to freight during the war. Military control was relinquished on 19 February 1945. On 7 October 1946, passenger services were reinstated on the southern section of the railway as far as Lyminge. Six trains a day were operated until the last train ran on 14 June 1947. The Elham Valley Railway closed on 1 October 1947. After closure, the goods yard used by the local coal merchant. In 1987, the station building was converted to serve as Lyminge's library.

Preceding station	Disused railways	Following station
Elham	Southern Railway; Elham Valley Railway	Cheriton halt
