= Park Gate Down =

Protected area in Kent, England

Parkgate Down
- Site of Special Scientific Interest
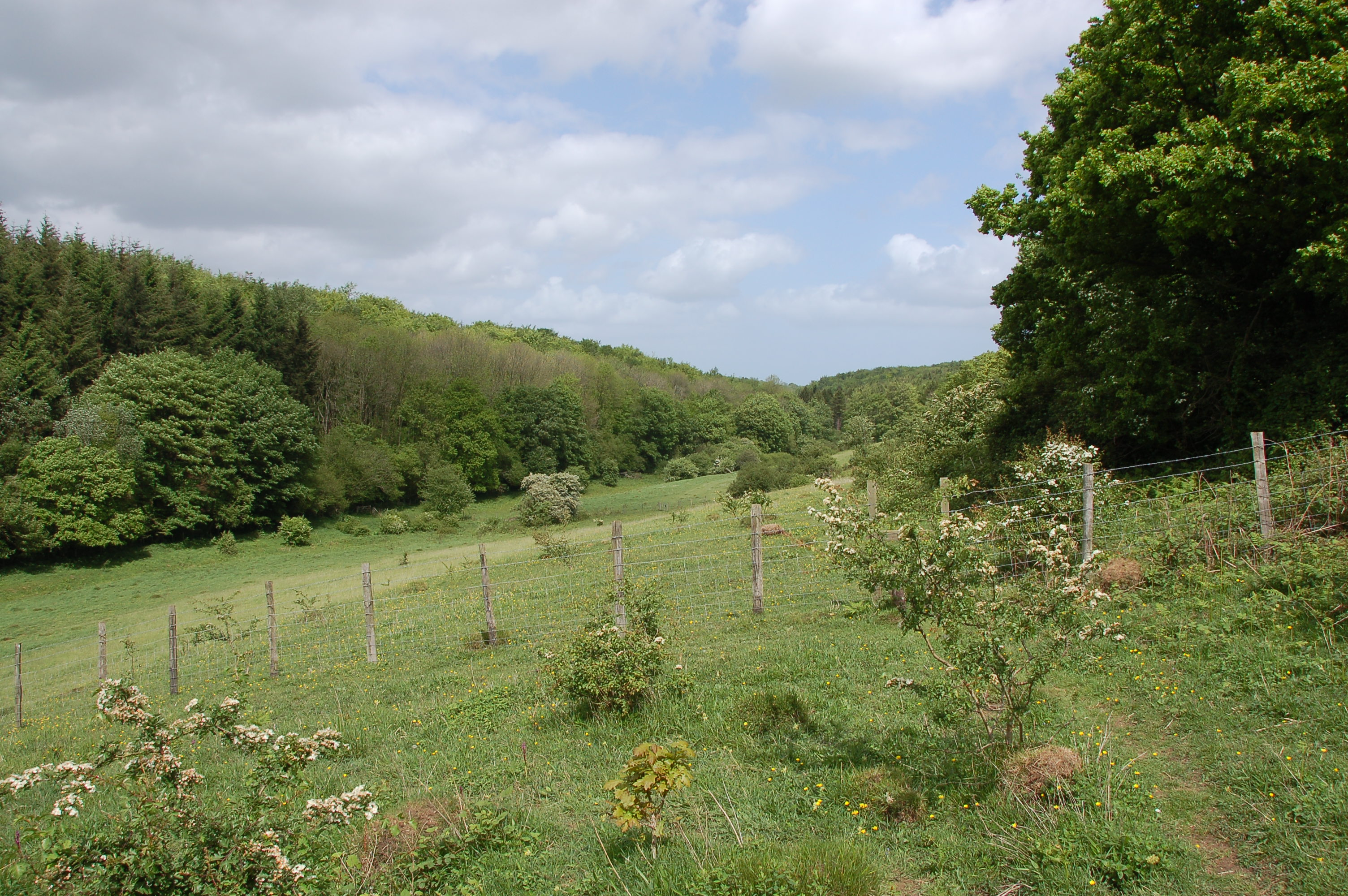
- Location of Parkgate Down.
- Area of search: Kent
- Grid reference: TR 168 459
- Interest: Biological
- Area: 7.0 hectares (17 acres)
- Notification date: 1984
- Location map: Magic Map

Park Gate Down or Parkgate Down is a 7-hectare (17-acre) biological Site of Special Scientific Interest south-east of Stelling Minnis in Kent. It is also a Special Area of Conservation and is managed by the Kent Wildlife Trust,

== Topography ==
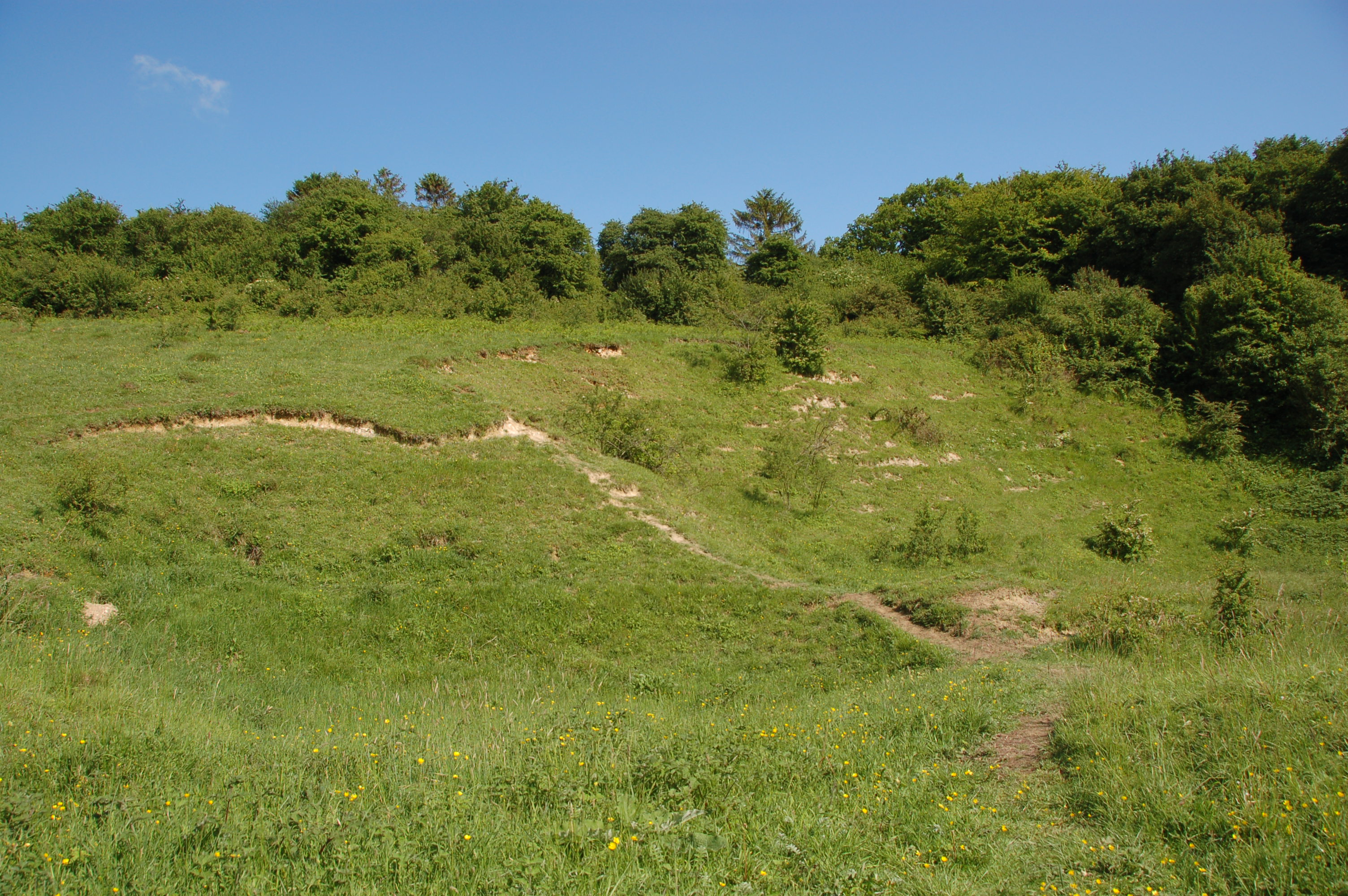
The disused chalk pit at Park Gate Down.

Park Gate Down is located at 51°10′16″N 01°06′10″E (Ordnance Survey reference TR168459) and covers seven hectares on the eastern slopes of a dry valley on the dip slope of the North Downs. The reserve is predominantly chalk grassland although the eastern fringes consist of a mixture of woodland and scrub which is partially situated on a layer of clay with flints that caps the chalk. In the south eastern corner of the reserve is a disused chalk pit and the western and northern area of the reserve borders on Elham Park Wood. To the south of the reserve is an area of land managed under the Countryside Stewardship Scheme which is being reverted from arable land to chalk downland.

== Ecology ==
=== Flora ===
The dominant chalk grassland community at Park Gate Down is CG4 Brachypodium pinnatum. However, fine, less vigorous grasses are also common such as sheep's fescue (Festuca ovina). The reserve supports a rich flora including many calcicoles such as common milkwort (Polygala vulgaris), small scabious (Scabiosa columbaria) and marjoram (Origanum vulgare). Notable species include slender bedstraw (Galium pumilum), adder's tongue (Ophioglossum), horseshoe Vetch (Hippocrepis comosa) and columbine (Aquilegia vulgaris).

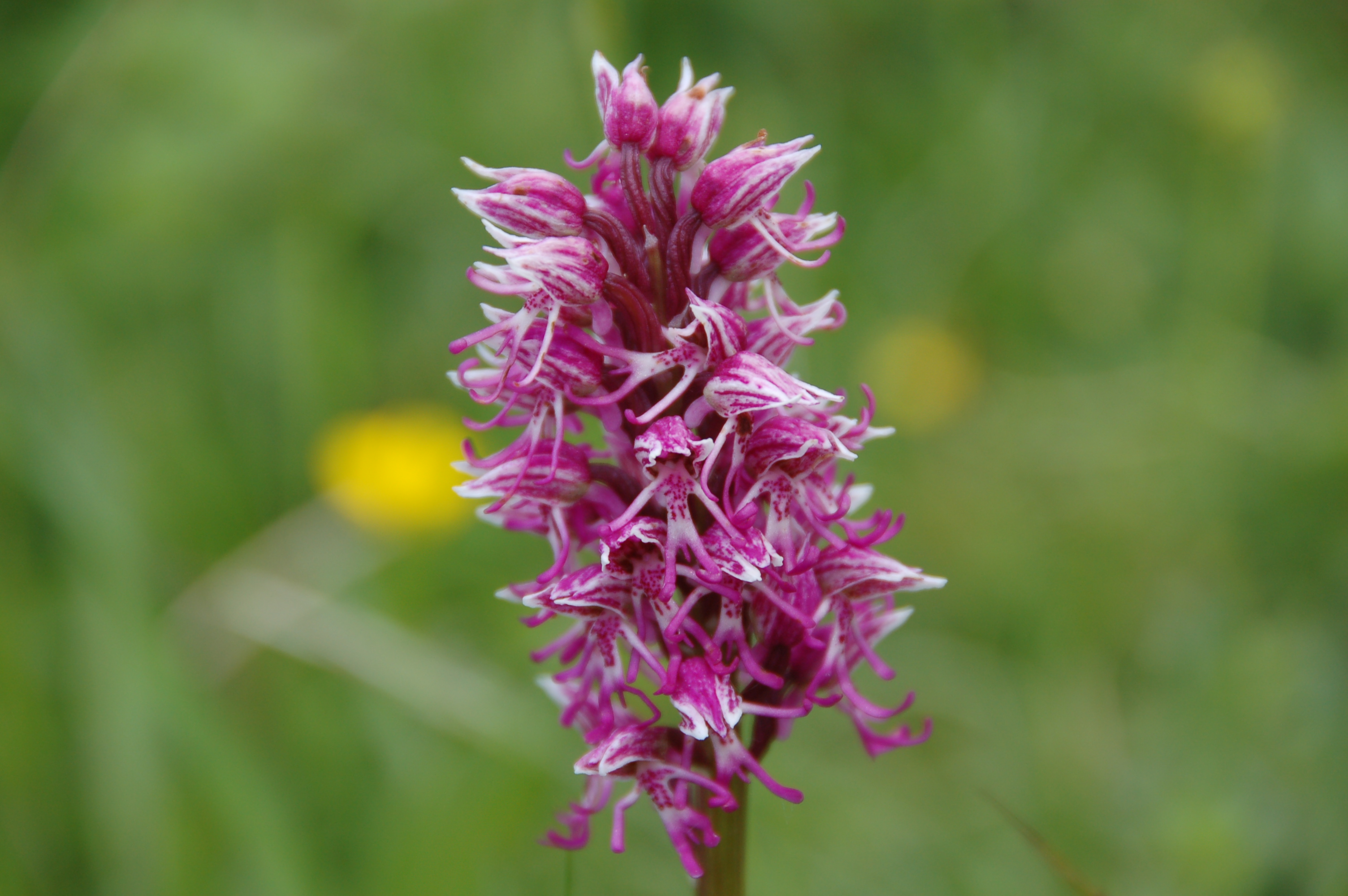
Monkey orchid at Park Gate Down.

Fourteen species of orchid are known to grow at the reserve including some of the UK's rarest species. Park Gate Down is one of only three sites in the UK for the nationally rare monkey orchid (Ochis simia). The orchid was introduced to the site during the twentieth century from another Kentish site and has since flourished with over 100 plants. Park Gate Down also supports the nationally rare late spider orchid (Ophrys fuciflora) that in the UK is limited to the North Downs in East Kent as well as the nationally scarce lady orchid (Orchis purpurea) and musk orchid (Herminium monorchis) of which 72 were counted in 2007.

=== Fauna ===
The chalk downland provides an important habitat for insects. Many butterflies thrive at the reserve including the chalkhill blue (Polyommatus coridon), brown argus (Aricia agestis) and marbled white (Melanargia galathea). The woodland and scrub within and surrounding the reserve attract many feeding and breeding birds including the nightingale (Luscinia megarhynchos), European green woodpecker (Picus viridis), great spotted woodpecker (Dendrocopos major), yellowhammer (Emberiza citrinella), linnet (Carduelis cannabina), whitethroat (Sylvia communis), garden warbler (Sylvia borin), hawfinch (Coccothraustes coccothraustes), sparrowhawk (Accipiter nisus) and hobby (Falco subbuteo).

== Management and access ==
The reserve is divided into three compartments by wire fences. The chalk grassland is maintained through annual grazing by Highland cattle and Konik ponies from September to December and scrub cutting in winter. This prevents tall and vigorous species from dominating, thus creating the species rich grassland characteristic of chalk downland. The woodland is regularly coppiced to provide a range of habitats for insects and birds.

There is road side parking opposite the entrance on the south of the reserve. Although access is unrestricted, visitors must keep to the paths to avoid damage.
