= Elham (surname) =

Elham (Persian: الهام) is a surname of Persian origin. Notable people with the surname include:

- Gholam-Hossein Elham (born 1959), Iranian politician
- Zahra Elham (born c. 2002), Afghan singer
