= Elham, Kent =

Village in Kent, England

Coordinates: 51.1528°N 1.1111°E

Elham
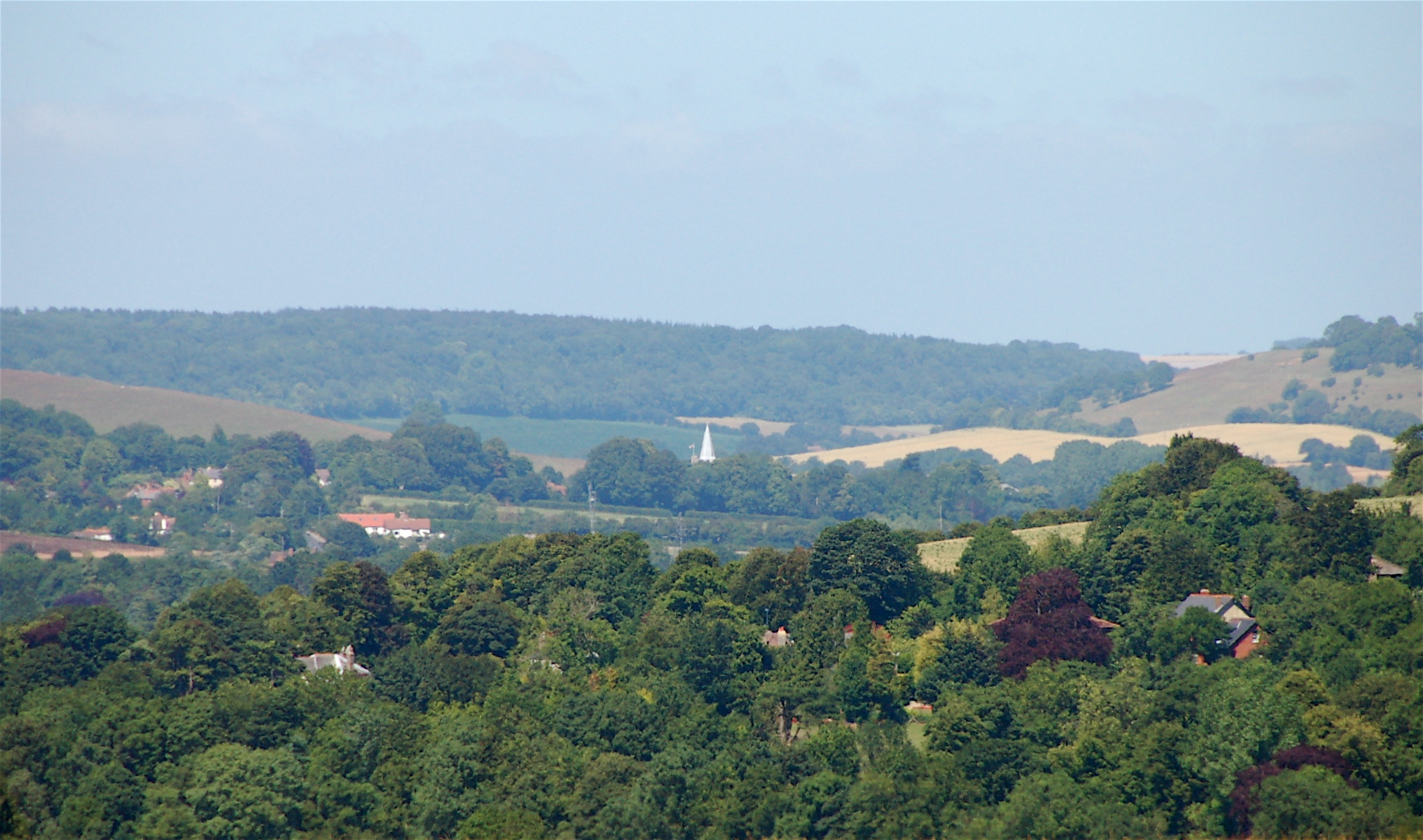
- Elham Valley from Tolsford Hill

- Location within Kent
- Population: 1,509 (2011)
- OS grid reference: TR175439
- District: Folkestone and Hythe
- Shire county: Kent
- Region: South East
- Country: England
- Sovereign state: United Kingdom
- Post town: Canterbury
- Postcode district: CT4
- Dialling code: 01303
- Police: Kent
- Fire: Kent
- Ambulance: South East Coast
- UK Parliament: Folkestone and Hythe

Elham (/ˈiːləm/) is a village and civil parish in East Kent situated approximately 9 miles (14 km) south of Canterbury and 5 miles (8 km) north west of Folkestone in the Elham Valley. At the 2011 Census the population included the hamlet of Ottinge and village of Wingmore.

== History ==
=== Toponymy ===
The origin of the village's name has always been a matter of argument. The village is listed in the Domesday Book of 1086 as Alham. The suffix "ham" is derived from the Old English "ham" meaning "homestead" or "hamm" meaning "meadow". The village may be the Ulaham referred to in an Anglo Saxon charter of 855 AD in which case the name means "homestead of a person named Ula". Indeed local legend has it the large chalk foundation stones of the Palace of Ula can be seen in the cellar of Flint Cottage. Another possibility is that the name originates from the presence of eels known to be found in the Nailbourne centuries ago. *To note an eel was caught in the Nailbourne by Tim Elgar in the nineteen seventies. A third possibility is that the first part of the name derives from the Old English "alh" meaning "temple".

=== Early history ===
The discovery of hundreds of Neolithic hand axes, scrapers and worked flints at Dreal's Farm on the chalk plateau to the east of the village is the earliest evidence of human activity in the parish. Bronze Age remains have also been discovered indicating continuity of settlement. There is also a cluster of Bronze Age tumuli in Elham Park Wood and there is a further tumulus on the hillcrest between Ottinge and Rhodes Minnis. Evidence of Roman occupation is limited to discoveries of coins and pottery and there is little Anglo Saxon archaeological evidence although the Anglo Saxon cemetery at Lyminge may extend over the parish boundary.

St Mary's Church dates from about 1200 whilst the Abbot's Fireside Restaurant on the high street is of Stuart origin (built in 1641). Local legend has it King Charles 1st hid from the Roundheads behind the big fireplace following his escape from Hampton Court during his attempt to get to France in 1647/48. It is also reputed to have been the headquarters of the Duke of Wellington during the times when there was a threat from Napoleonic invasion. In the centre of the village is the Square. This dates from 1251 when the village was granted a market by Edward I and was in use until the early 19th century. The village once had two windmills but both now no longer exist.

=== 19th century to present day ===
The population of Elham was 1,192 in 1881. Elham Valley Railway opened in 1889 and closed in 1947. There are still traces of its existence throughout the parish such as the remains of the station platforms at the bottom of Duck Lane. Until the early 1900s a brickworks existed within the village (the Elham Valley Brick and Tile Company) with kilns situated on the east side of the valley.

== Governance ==
Elham Parish Council oversees matters within the village. The parish is very large for such a small settlement, stretching to the edge of Lyminge in the south, to the hamlet of Breach in the north and east to Acrise and west to Stelling Minnis. Elham is situated within the Elham and Stelling Minnis ward within the local government district of Folkestone and Hythe. The population of this ward at the 2011 Census was 2,087. The present local councillor for the Elham and Stelling Minnis Ward is Pamela Carr. The village is located within the constituency of Folkestone and Hythe.

== Economy and services ==
Elham Church of England Aided Primary School provides education for children aged 4 to 11. There is also a pre-school playgroup operating within the village hall and a doctor's surgery. The village has a convenience store, Londis opened in the former bank building on the High Street in summer 2026. The original Elham Valley Stores closed in late 2026. The village tea room closed in 2026 and its premises remain vacant. At the hamlet of Breach, just outside the parish, is the Elham Valley Vineyard.

The village has three public houses: the King's Arms, which underwent renovation and reopened in May 2023 to coincide with the coronation of King Charles III; the Abbot's Fireside, which previously operated as a restaurant before reopening as a pub and restaurant in autumn 2026; and the Rose and Crown, which closed in early 2025 and remains vacant. The New Inn, another former public house, has been converted into residential accommodation.

Local services declined during the latter half of the 20th century and into the 21st century, and the village no longer has a dedicated baker's, butcher's, garage, newsagent's or bookshop.

Similar to many other villages in the UK there is a shortage of social housing but there is no obvious sign of real demand. There is availability of property for families and those on ordinary incomes. Improvements in agriculture and the decline of local businesses has resulted in fewer employment opportunities within the village than there were in the early 20th century. Elham is located on the 17 bus route from Folkestone to Canterbury operated by Stagecoach.

== Environment and conservation ==
Elham is situated deep in the heart of the North Downs and within the Kent Downs Area of Outstanding Natural Beauty. Whilst much of the countryside surrounding the village is arable farmland there are still patches of unimproved or semi-improved grassland where wildlife is allowed to flourish such as Baldock Downs and Hall Downs. These sites often support many typical chalk downland species such as Common Milkwort (Polygala vulgaris), Field Scabious (Knautia arvensis) and Salad Burnet (Sanguisorba minor) as well as orchids such as Fragrant (Gymnadenia conopsea), Common Spotted (Dactylorhiza fuchsii) and Pyramidal (Anacamptis pyramidalis).

Park Gate Down nature reserve is situated within the parish and is well known for its extensive downland flora. The site and the roadside nature reserve near the chalk pit are managed by Kent Wildlife Trust. Several other areas of land within the parish are maintained under the Countryside Stewardship Scheme whilst there are also designated Sites of Special Scientific Interest at Park Gate Down and Shuttlesfield Down. Elham Park Wood is owned and managed by the Forestry Commission. Local volunteers and farmers also carry out work to conserve and manage the environment. There is also an active environmental group who aim to reduce carbon emissions within the local community and receive support from Kent Energy Centre and Kent County Council.

== Notable people ==
Romani king and bare-knuckle boxer Gilderoy Scamp died in Elham in 1893. Kent and England wicket-keeper Les Ames was born and brought up in Elham. Another Kent and England cricketer Mark Ealham used to live in the Square. Academy Award-winning actress Audrey Hepburn spent some of her childhood in Elham. Prime Minister Anthony Eden lived at Park Gate just north-west of Elham during the Second World War. Actress Pam Ferris has lived in Elham since 2009.
