= Elham Valley Railway =

Railway in Kent, England (closed 1947)

Coordinates: 51°05′57.6″N 1°07′02.6″E

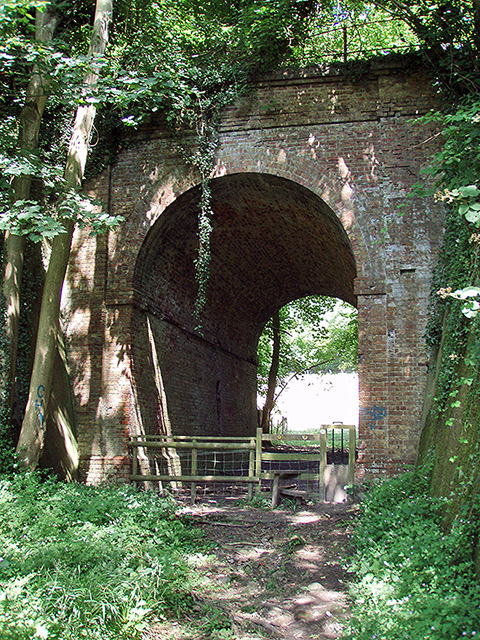
- Railway bridge near Etchinghill, formerly used by the Elham Valley Railway

Overview
- Status: lifted
- Locale: Kent, England

Service
- Operator(s): South Eastern Railway (1887–1899); South Eastern and Chatham Railway (1899–1923); Southern Railway (1923–1947)

History
- Work began: 1884
- Opened: 4 July 1887 (Cheriton–Barham); 1 July 1889 (Barham–Canterbury)
- Closed: 1 October 1947

Technical
- Line length: 16.25 mi (26.15 km)
- Track gauge: 4 ft 8 1/2 in (1,435 mm) standard gauge

The Elham Valley Railway was a line connecting Folkestone and Canterbury in Kent, England. It opened between 1887 and 1889 and closed in 1947.

The line was originally proposed by the independent Elham Valley Light Railway Company in the mid-19th century. After the project was cancelled owing to financial difficulties, it was revived by the South Eastern Railway who were competing with the rival London, Chatham and Dover Railway for railway traffic. The scheme was complicated by the imposing geography of the Elham Valley and the construction of two significant tunnels. The southern section from Cheriton to Barham opened in 1887, with the northern section to Canterbury opening two years later.

The Elham Valley Railway was never commercially successful as it passed through predominantly rural areas. During World War II it was appropriated by the War Department who used it for defence, including a large rail-mounted gun stationed on the line. After the conflict, the line passed back into civilian use, but the route now had competing bus traffic. A shuttle service from Folkestone to Lyminge was reinstated in 1946, but closed the following year; the remainder of the line never re-opened. Some of the railway has been demolished, including Elham railway station, but parts of the infrastructure including the two tunnels have survived. The history of the line is commemorated in a local museum.

== Background ==
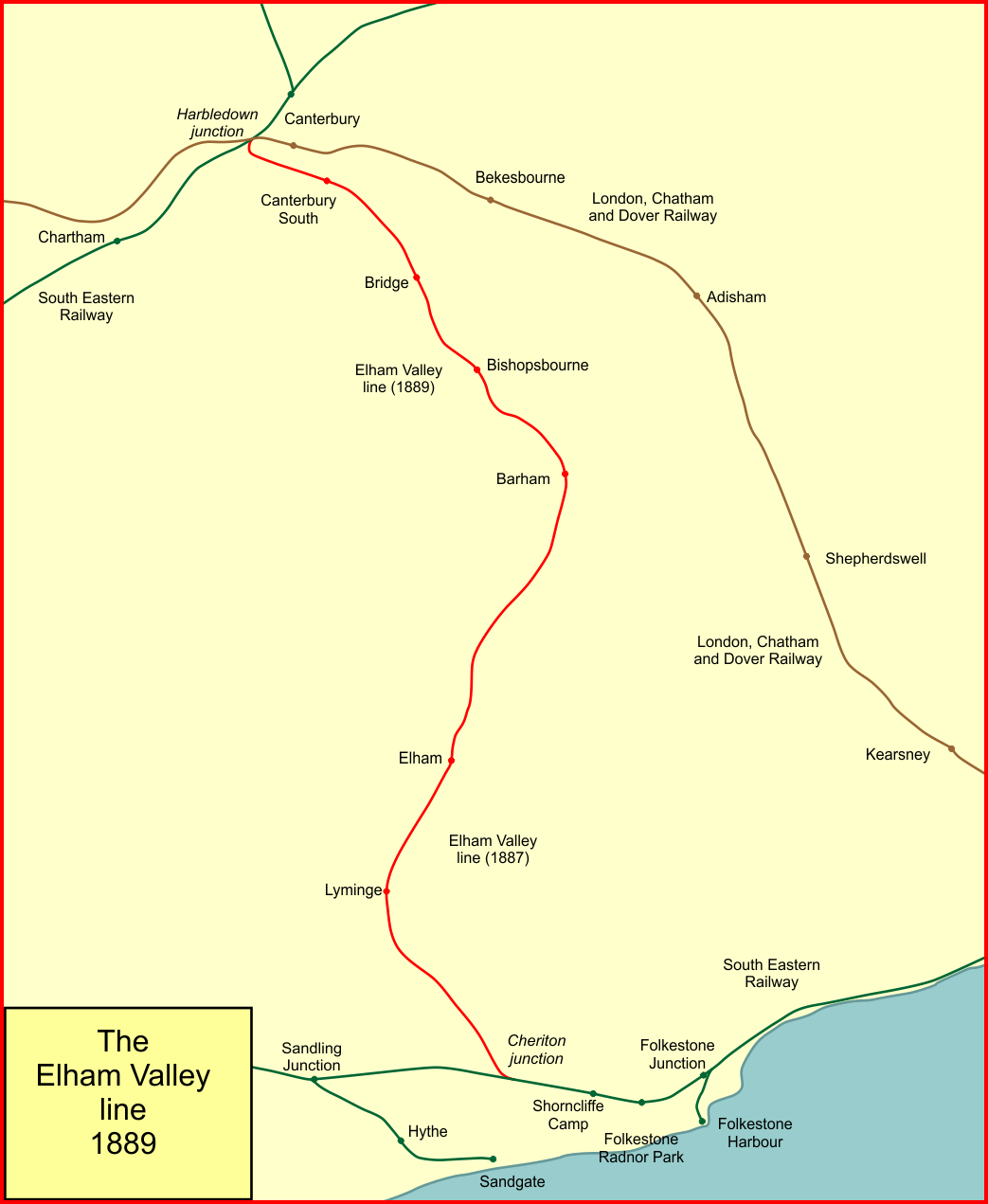
The Elham Valley line

The South Eastern Railway opened the main line to Ashford in 1842. A connection to Folkestone opened the following year and to Canterbury in 1846. At the same time, the East Kent Railway was constructing a line from Canterbury to Dover. However, the imposing geography of the Elham Valley that connects Canterbury to Folkestone meant that unlike much of Kent, no railway line was proposed to run through it during the Railway Mania of this time.

Elham Valley Railway Act 1866
- Act of Parliament
- Parliament of the United Kingdom
- Long title: An Act for making a Railway from Canterbury to Hythe in the County of Kent, with Branches to join the London, Chatham, and Dover and South-eastern Railways.
- Citation: 29 & 30 Vict. c. cccxvi
- Territorial extent: United Kingdom

Dates
- Royal assent: 6 August 1866
- Commencement: 6 August 1866 (Note: The Acts of Parliament (Commencement) Act 1793.)
- Repealed: 31 January 2013
Other legislation
| Repealed by | Statute Law (Repeals) Act 2013 |

Status: Repealed

The valley was poorly connected to the nearest market towns, Ashford and Canterbury, with the main road being little more than a dirt track. Landowners and residents saw that they were isolated in the absence of a railway, and proposed an independent scheme for a line. The first prospectus was presented to Parliament in 1865, outlining an "Elham Valley Light Railway Company" which would build a single-line railway starting at Hythe on the coast, running up through the Seabrook valley, through Newington and joining the existing SER and East Kent lines. The line was planned as a light railway with a maximum speed of 25 miles per hour (40 km/h). It was authorised by Parliament as the Elham Valley Railway Act 1866 (29 & 30 Vict. c. cccxvi) on 6 August 1866, but serious financial difficulties plagued the scheme due to the national financial crisis, and the project was cancelled. It was abandoned by a Board of Trade Order on 30 August 1873 because of "failure to raise sufficient capital".

The East Kent Railway had since been renamed as the London, Chatham and Dover Railway (LCDR), and developed ideas for a new line from Folkestone to Canterbury. The LCDR's chairman James Staats Forbes argued this would provide better connections between Folkestone and Canterbury as passengers would not need to change trains. The route would compete with the coastal SER line via Dover that passed by unstable chalk cliffs. On 14 November 1875, a severe storm damaged the SER line towards Dover, and in January 1877, a series of storms flooded the track, culminating in the collapse of the Martello Tunnel on 12 January. The line was shut until 12 March and did not recover full operation until 30 May. During this outage, the LCDR billed the SER for temporary use of its lines.

Elham Valley Light Railway Act 1881 (Note: Section 1.)
- Act of Parliament
- Parliament of the United Kingdom
- Long title: An Act for making a railway from Canterbury through the Elham Valley to join the South-eastern Railway in the parish of Cheriton, in the county of Kent; and for other purposes.
- Citation: 44 & 45 Vict. c. cxxxii
- Territorial extent: United Kingdom

Dates
- Royal assent: 18 July 1881
- Commencement: 18 July 1881

Status: Current legislation

Text of statute as originally enacted

To compete with the LCDR, the SER proposed a line from Cheriton to Canterbury in 1879. This project was rejected by Parliament the following year, but it was reintroduced in a modified form as the Elham Valley Light Railway Company, and the Elham Valley Light Railway Act 1881 (44 & 45 Vict. c. cxxxii) received royal assent on 18 July 1881. Despite an authorised capital of £150,000 (£15,769,000 as of 2025), no construction took place. The rival SER and LCDR schemes were advocated locally, with posters displayed around Folkestone supporting both, while Forbes and the SER's Edward Watkin accused each other of sabotage. In order to strengthen their case, the SER agreed to take over the Elham Valley Railway, and construct it as a double-track line to standard gauge like the rest of its network. The SER scheme was authorised on 28 July 1884 by the South Eastern Railway (Various Powers) Act 1884 (47 & 48 Vict. c. cxcviii). It was nominally independent, with power adopted by the SER on completion.

== Construction and opening ==
Construction formally started on 28 August 1884 with the "cutting of the first sod" by Sir George Russell at Peene near Folkestone. Work had started on the 97-yard (89 m) Etchinghill Tunnel before any ground had been cut for the main track. The entire line was undulating, including a stiff climb at 1 in 90 for 2 1/2 miles (4.0 km) from Cheriton Junction. It approached Bridge by a short climb at 1 in 86 from the south; running south from Harbledown Junction there was a mile-long climb at 1 in 70 followed by a mile and a half at 1 in 183. The work was engineered by Thomas A. Walker. Residents of Cheriton and Newington requested the SER to build a station for their villages, but were refused.

Construction was quick, and the line was ready from Cheriton Junction to Barham in 1887. A Board of Trade inspection took place on 1 July, conducted by Major-General Charles Scrope Hutchinson. It passed, and the line opened to passengers on 4 July. There was no formal ceremony but local villagers came out to celebrate the first service from Shorncliffe (now Folkestone West) at 8:05 am. Continuing north, landowner Matthew Bell objected about the line passing through his land at Bourne Park, and following a dispute the company agreed to a 329-yard (301 m) cut-and-cover tunnel. A station was built at Bishopsbourne because the land could be provided by Bell's family for free. Watkin was still keen to link the railway with the LCDR and proposed a junction where the two lines cross near Harbledown. It was rejected by the LCDR.

The northern section was complete by 1889 and opened on 1 July following a satisfactory inspection by Hutchinson. (Note: Grant makes a different claim; that the line opened "to Canterbury South Station on 1 July 1889. In 1890 a connection from Canterbury South Station was made to ... Harbledown Junction.") Harbledown Junction signal box had 15 levers. The construction of the 16 1/4-mile (26.2 km) line had cost £361,776 (£40,193,000 as of 2025), with land and associated charges amounting to £68,148 (£7,571,000 as of 2025). The £12,000 per mile estimated in 1866 had risen to £27,000 per mile. In addition to the stations, public sidings were provided at Wingmore, 2 miles (3.2 km) south of Barham, and Ottinge, just over 1 mile (1.6 km) south of Elham. The SER absorbed the Elham Valley Light Railway on 1 July 1891.

== Post-opening ==
The passenger timetable had settled down by 1890, when every up train for the Elham valley started from Dover, stopping at every station to Canterbury. Alternate trains continued to Ramsgate and Margate. There were seven weekday trains and five Sunday trains each way. The South Eastern Railway and the London, Chatham and Dover Railway formed a working union known as the South Eastern and Chatham Railway (SE&CR) in 1899.

In 1905 eight steam-powered railmotors were built for the SE&CR; these were self-contained coaches with a small steam engine, intended to enable low-cost passenger operation on lightly used branch lines. Two were allocated to Dover in 1911, when they operated between Folkestone Junction and Elham. The small power unit struggled to cope with gradients, and the 1 in 90 climb up to Etchinghill was challenging in the summer months when they conveyed a trailer car. They were not considered successful and were withdrawn in 1916. During World War I, the line was singled. Double track was reinstated shortly after the war ended. On 19 December 1915, a landslip at Folkestone Warren Halt resulted in the South Eastern Main Line being closed. The Elham Valley Railway was then the only way to travel between Folkestone and Dover by rail.

When the Elham Valley Railway was being built, local people had requested a station at Cheriton, but the SER refused. On 1 May 1908 a halt at Cheriton was opened to the public. It was on the main line but used by the valley trains and staff trains only, except on rare occasions. It was closed seven years later for the duration of World War I, and was re-opened in June 1920 until World War II, when it was abandoned for five years.

== Decline and military use ==
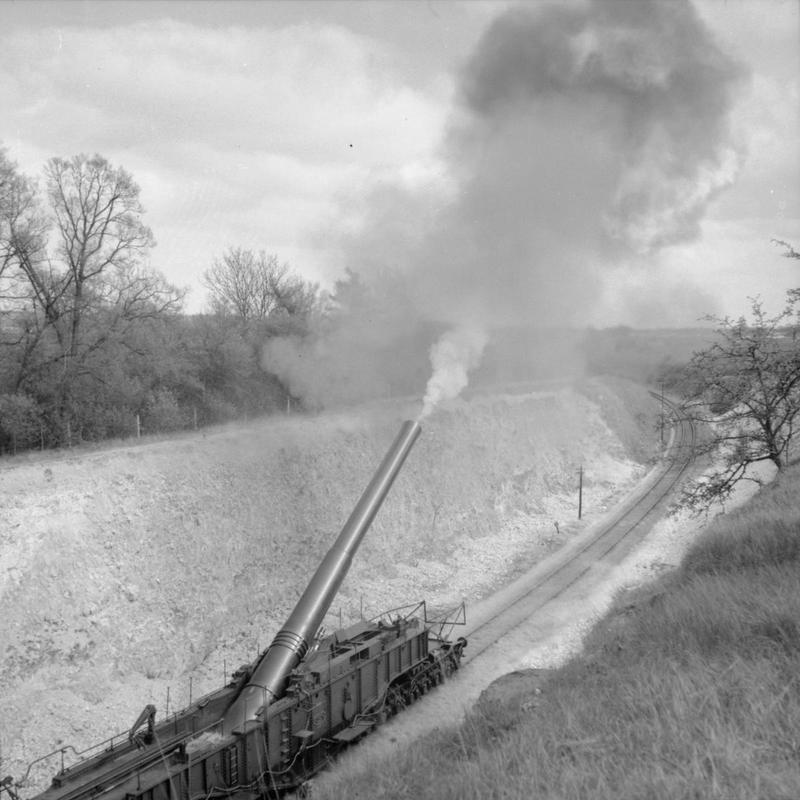
The Boche Buster firing near Bishopsbourne on 7 May 1941

The Railways Act 1921 mandated that most railway companies in Great Britain would be "grouped" into one of four new companies. Consequently, the SE&CR became part of the Southern Railway (SR) at the beginning of 1923. By this time, revenue on the line had dropped because of competition from road transport. The line had only ever conveyed local, rural traffic, and in 1931 arrangements were made to single the line between Harbledown Junction and Lyminge as an economy measure. This was commissioned on 25 October 1931. The signal box at Lyminge was closed on 1 May 1937 as a cost-cutting measure, a ground frame being provided in the station building.

The Kent coast area was considered to be vulnerable in the event of an anticipated attack by enemy forces during World War II. On 13 August 1940, a Dornier Do 17 crashed into the line just north of Barham station. The authorities took complete charge of the line for defence purposes and on 25 October, the passenger service between Lyminge and Canterbury was suspended. This was so that loop sidings could be installed at Canterbury South, Barham and Elham. Sidings were also added north of Lyminge and the line through Bourne Park tunnel was relaid as a passing loop. At Lyminge, two twelve-inch guns were mounted on the railway, but moved to Elham after an attack on 7 November.

On 2 December, the SR suspended the passenger service north of Lyminge and the line was handed over to the Railway Operating Department, Royal Engineers. The remainder of the line continued to run, though Cheriton Halt was closed on 1 February 1941. Goods were transported by the War Department, but retained SR staff at all stations.

Three heavy rail-mounted guns were deployed on the Elham Valley line. The railway route followed a meandering course, enabling the guns to be trained by moving them along the line to a suitable location. The wooded landscape also gave cover. The heaviest gun was an 18-inch (460 mm) railway howitzer nicknamed the "Boche Buster". It was stationed at Bourne Park and could be stood down in the tunnel, avoiding enemy attack. The gun could fire a 6-foot (1.8 m) 1.75-long-ton (1.78 t) shell up to 12.5 miles (20 km) and was capable of reaching Pegwell Bay near Ramsgate. The other two guns were deployed, to Elham and Adisham respectively.

The gun was first fired on the morning of 13 February 1941, when the equipment was towed to a stretch of track near Kingston for calibration tests. Several rounds were fired out into mid-channel; the results were sighted and marked by observation posts on the cliffs at Dover. In the Kingston and Barham area villagers were warned to open doors and windows, but the blasts were so severe that in many cases houses were damaged. The gun was fired on only two other occasions, shortly after the first; one at the World's Wonder bridge between Barham and Elham and the other at Lickpot bridge, Elham. On 31 October 1941, a fireman was killed on the footplate near Barham during an air raid. In 1944, all three guns were transported to Salisbury Plain in connection with preparations for the Normandy landings.

On 3 May 1943, Lyminge and Hythe stations were closed to passengers. Goods traffic continued to be run by the War Department. The line was briefly used for military training purposes during this time.

== Closure ==
In March 1944, the line was derequisitioned by the War Department, and normal goods operation was resumed on 19 February 1945. However, the railway was not in a suitable state to carry passengers; the signalling system needed to be restored and surplus sidings needed to be renewed. Station buildings had several broken glass planes and damaged locks, and the floor at Elham station had been saturated with oil, rendering it unusable. The War Department ground frames and points at Bishopbourne were decommissioned on 2 May 1946.

The Folkestone to Lyminge section of the line was reinstated as a shuttle passenger service on 7 October 1946. By then, bus routes were providing an alternative to passengers who couldn't use the line while it was under military control, and it became increasingly obvious that the passenger train service was not competitive. On 16 June 1947 the passenger service was withdrawn, and on 1 October 1947 the line closed completely to revenue traffic.

Track was still in situ at Elham and Lyminge in 1952, and at Harbledown Junction in 1953. The road bridge across Wincheap (the A28) south of Canterbury was removed in March 1955. The bridge across the River Stour was demolished on 26 April. The remaining steel bridges across the line were removed between 1958 and 1965.

== Rolling stock ==
The line used several types of motive power, including Cudworth's 118 Class, Stirling's O and Q Class, Maunsell's N Class and Wainwright's C and H Class locomotives, and railmotors. During World War II, the War Department operated the Dean Goods locomotives on the line.

== Locations ==
- Harbledown Junction; on main line between Ashford and Canterbury; (Note: Closure dates shown are for passengers; goods stations were closed at other times in some locations)
- Canterbury South; opened 1 July 1889 as South Canterbury; closed 1 December 1940;
- Bridge; opened 1 July 1889; closed 1 December 1940;
- Bishopsbourne; opened 1 July 1889; closed 1 December 1940;
- Barham; opened 4 July 1887; closed 1 December 1940;
- Elham; opened 4 July 1887; closed 1 December 1940;
- Lyminge; opened 4 July 1887; closed 3 May 1943; reopened 7 October 1946; closed 16 June 1947;
- Cheriton Junction; on SER main line between Ashford and Dover.

== Legacy ==
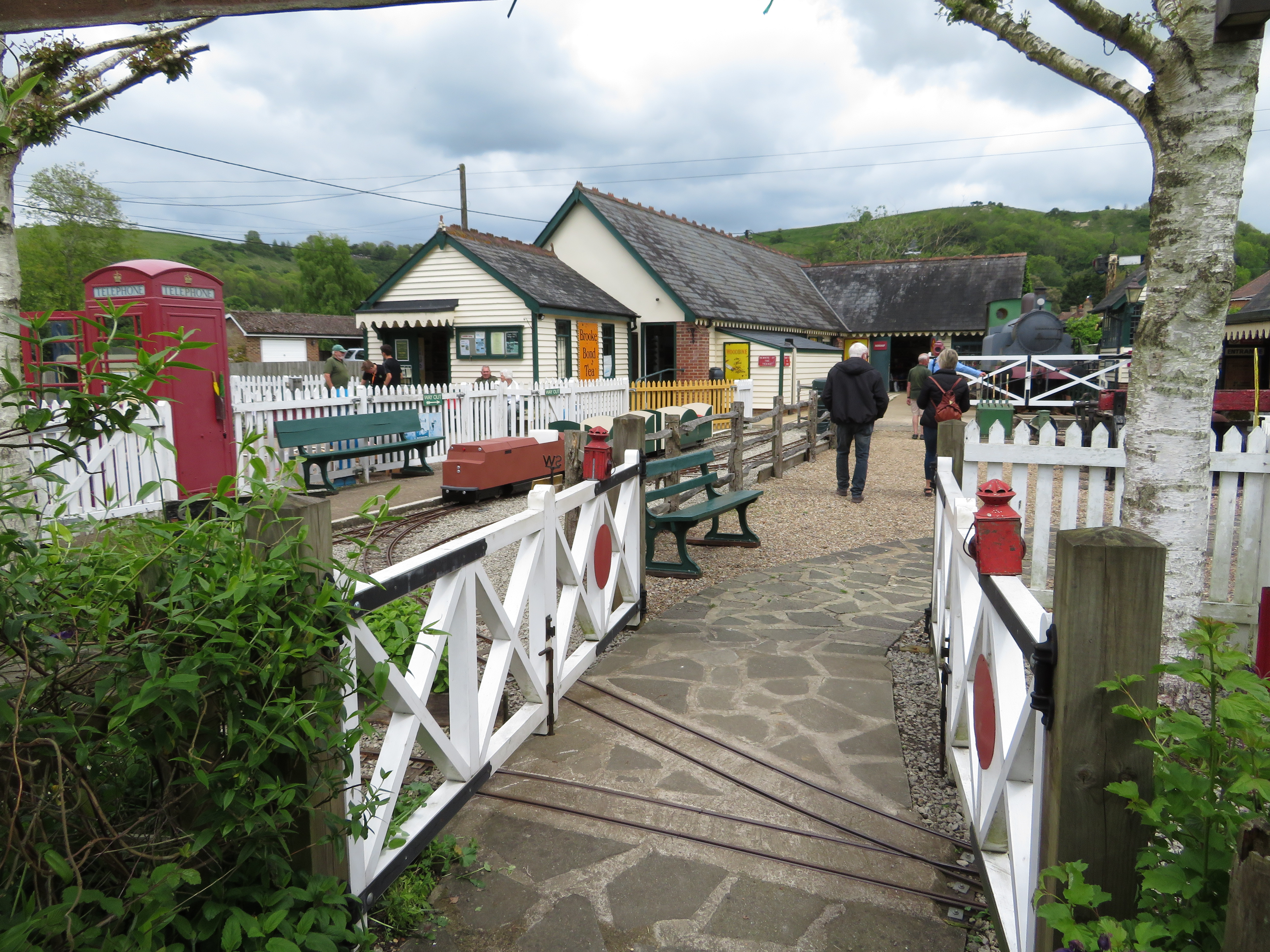
The Elham Valley Railway Museum, Peene

Both tunnels survive, as does some of the trackbed albeit largely covered by vegetation. Three stations still exist, Lyminge as a public library and those at Bishopsbourne and Bridge as private residences. Between Canterbury West and South only a short section of embankment survives curving away from the junction at Harbledown. Little remains of the route between Barham and Lyminge. After closure, Elham station was regularly occupied by squatters. It suffered increasing vandalism and was demolished in 1964.

The section between Peene and Cheriton Junction has been built over by the Channel Tunnel terminal building. Canterbury South and Barham stations have been lost to housing developments. At Elham, a small section of brickwork from the "up" station platform has survived.

There is a museum at Peene, near the Channel Tunnel terminal, which contains many artifacts of railway history including a signal box, and a working model railway of the line as operated by the SER. It is housed in an early 18th-century barn that was previously sited on what is now the Channel Tunnel terminal.

The line was featured in "Walking Kent's Lost Railways", a 2021 episode of Channel 5 television series Walking Britain's Lost Railways.

== Bibliography ==
- Butt, R. V. J. (October 1995). The Directory of Railway Stations: details every public and private passenger station, halt, platform and stopping place, past and present (1st ed.). Sparkford: Patrick Stephens Ltd. ISBN 978-1-85260-508-7. OCLC 60251199. OL 11956311M.
- Course, Edwin (1974). The Railways of Southern England: Secondary and Branch Lines. London: B T Batsford. ISBN 0-7134-2835-X.
- Forwood, M J (1975). The Elham Valley Railway. Chichester: Phillimore & Co Ltd. ISBN 0-85033-110-2.
- Grant, Donald J (2017). Directory of the Railway Companies of Great Britain. Kibworth Beauchamp: Matador Publishers. ISBN 978-1785893 -537.
- Gray, Adrian (1990). South Eastern Railway. Middleton Press. ISBN 978-0-906-52085-7.
- Harding, Peter A. (1996). Branch Lines in Kent. Knaphill: Peter A. Harding. ISBN 0 9523458 1 1.
- Hart, Brian (1984). The Elham Valley Line. Upper Bucklebury: Wild Swan Publications Ltd. ISBN 0-906867-22-3.
- McCarthy, Colin; McCarthy, David (2007). Railways of Britain – Kent and East Sussex. Ian Allan. ISBN 978-0-7110-3222-4.
- Mitchell, Vic; Smith, Keith (1995). Branch Lines Around Canterbury. Midhurst: Middleton Press. ISBN 1 873793 58 8.
- Nock, O. S. (1961). The South Eastern and Chatham Railway. London: Ian Allan.
- White, H P (1976). Railways of South East England. Newton Abbot: David and Charles. ISBN 0-7153-7286-6.
