= Grade II* listed war memorials in England =

There are 139 Grade II* listed war memorials in England, out of more than 4,000 listed war memorials. In the United Kingdom, a listed building is a building or structure of special historical or architectural importance. Listing provides legal protection against demolition or modification, with any changes requiring permission from the local planning authority. Listed buildings are divided into three categories—Grade I, Grade II*, and Grade II—which reflect the relative significance of the structure and may influence planning decisions. Grade I is the most significant and accounts for 2.5% of listed buildings, while Grade II accounts for 92%. Grade II* is the intermediate grade, representing the remaining 5.5%; it is reserved for "particularly important buildings of more than special interest".

A war memorial listed at Grade II* may be of particular artistic merit or accomplishment, of highly unusual design, or of significant historical interest below the threshold required for Grade I. It is explicitly unnecessary for the architect or sculptor to be well known for a memorial to be listed at Grade II*. As part of the commemorations of the centenary of the First World War, Historic England—the government body responsible for listing in England—launched a project aimed at significantly increasing the number of war memorials on the National Heritage List for England.

This list includes only memorials that are Grade II* listed buildings in their own right. Memorials that are not free-standing—such as plaques on church walls—or that form part of the curtilage of a listed building—such as sculptures within a building—but do not have their own entry on the National Heritage List for England are not included.

War memorials in England take a wide variety of forms and commemorate centuries of conflicts. However, memorials dedicated to conflicts and the soldiers who fought in them—rather than exclusively commemorating victorious commanders—only became commonplace after the Battle of Waterloo in 1815, which ended the Napoleonic Wars. The aftermath of the First World War (1914–1918) produced significantly more memorials than any other single conflict; consequently, this list is dominated by First World War memorials, many of which were later re-dedicated or expanded to reflect losses from the Second World War (1939–1945).

The list also includes five memorials to the Second Boer War (1899–1902), for which around 1,000 memorials were built in Britain, four commissioned specifically to commemorate the Second World War, and one each for the Seven Years' War (1756–1763) and the Crimean War (1853–1856).

== Memorials ==
| Name | ID | Image | Location | Conflict | Architect | Type | Inauguration date | Listing date |
|---|---|---|---|---|---|---|---|---|
| Mells War Memorial | 1058315 | | Mells, Somerset | First and Second World Wars | Sir Edwin Lutyens | Miscellaneous | 1921 | 1 January 1969 |
| Merchant Seamen's Memorial | 1031597 | | Tower Hill, London Borough of Tower Hamlets | Second World War | Sir Edward Maufe | Memorial garden | 1955 | 15 April 1998 |
| Radcliffe Cenotaph | 1067192 | | Radcliffe, Greater Manchester | First and Second World Wars | Sydney Marsh | Cenotaph | 1922 | 10 March 1992 |
| Stockton-on-Tees War Memorial | 1139979 | | Stockton-on-Tees, County Durham | First World War | Henry Vaughan Lanchester | Sculptures on plinth | 1923 | 19 January 1951 |
| Hoylake and West Kirby War Memorial | 1116883 | | West Kirby, Merseyside | First and Second World Wars | Charles Sargeant Jagger | Obelisk and sculptures | 1922 | 24 March 2011 |
| Bromley War Memorial | 1116976 | | Bromley, London Borough of Bromley | First and Second World Wars | Sydney March | Obelisk and sculptures | 1922 | 14 December 1995 |
| Beaumont College war memorial | 1119797 | | Old Windsor, Berkshire | First World War | Sir Giles Gilbert Scott | Altar and sculpture | 1920 | 26 June 1998 |
| Stalybridge War Memorial | 1163074 | | Stalybridge, Greater Manchester | First World War | Ferdinand Victor Blundstone | Sculpture group | 1920 | 6 February 1986 |
| Bridgwater War Memorial | 1197395 | | Bridgwater, Somerset | First World War | John Angel | Sculpture | 1924 | 16 December 1974 |
| 79th Regiment Memorial | 1205759 | | Clifton, Bristol | Seven Years' War (1756–1763) | Unknown | Cenotaph | 1766 | 8 January 1959 |
| Northumberland Fusiliers' War Memorial Gateway | 1281571 | | Hexham, Northumberland | First World War | | Arch | Late 17th/early 18th century | 2 October 1951 |
| South African War Memorial, York | 1257874 | | York, North Yorkshire | Second Boer War | George Frederick Bodley | Cross | 1905 | 1 July 1968 |
| Boer War Memorial Arch, Brompton Barracks | 1375606 | | Brompton, Kent | Second Boer War | Ingress Bell | Memorial arch | 1902 | 8 July 1998 |
| North Eastern Railway War Memorial | 1256553 | | York, North Yorkshire | First and Second World Wars | Sir Edwin Lutyens | Obelisk, screen walls, and Stone of Remembrance | 1924 | 10 September 1970 |
| South African War Memorial, Clifton College | 1282343 | | Bristol | Second Boer War | Alfred Drury | Sculpture on plinth | 1904 | 4 March 1977 |
| Memorial at Cambridge American Cemetery and Memorial | 1376611 | | Madingley, Cambridgeshire | Second World War | Perry Dean Rogers Architects | Chapel and memorial wall | 1954 | 25 September 1998 |
| Devon County War Memorial and Processional Way | 1393228 | | Exeter, Devon | First and Second World Wars | Sir Edwin Lutyens | Cross | 1921 | 16 April 2009 |
| Folkestone War Memorial | 1393854 | | Folkestone, Kent | First and Second World Wars | Ferdinand Victor Blundstone | Sculpture | 1922 | 24 June 2010 |
| 24th East Surrey Division War Memorial | 1391503 | | Battersea Park, London Borough of Wandsworth | First World War | Eric Kennington | Sculpture | 1924 | 24 August 2005 |
| Cross at Church of All Saints, East Pennard | 1345215 | | East Pennard, Somerset | First World War | Unknown | Cross | Fifteenth century, restored 1919 | 2 June 1961 |
| South African War Memorial, Worcester | 1389731 | | Worcester, Worcestershire | Second Boer War | William Robert Colton | Sculpture | 1908 | 19 August 1999 |
| Memorial at Holy Trinity Church, Wavertree | 1393740 | | Wavertree, Liverpool | First World War | George Herbert Tyson Smith | Cross | 1920 | 7 February 2001 |
| British Medical Association War Memorial | 1378969 | | British Medical Association House, Tavistock Square, London Borough of Camden | Second World War | James Woodford | Sculpture | 1954 | 15 April 1998 |
| Wigan War Memorial | 1384562 | | Wigan, Greater Manchester | First and Second World Wars | Sir Giles Gilbert Scott | Eleanor cross | 1921 | 24 October 1951 |
| Saltburn War Memorial | 1387499 | | Saltburn-by-the-Sea, North Yorkshire | First World War | Sir William Reynolds-Stephens | Cross | 1919 | 26 May 1999 |
| Memorial to the Engine Room Heroes | 1209973 | | Liverpool, Merseyside | First World War | Sir William Goscombe John | Obelisk | 1916 | 14 March 1975 |
| Commonwealth Air Forces Memorial | 1376599 | | Runnymede, Surrey | Second World War | Sir Edward Maufe | Memorial building | 1953 | 25 September 1998 |
| Crimean War Memorial, Brompton Barracks | 1375607 | | Brompton, Kent | Crimean War | Sir Matthew Digby Wyatt | Memorial arch | 1856 | 8 July 1998 |
| Midland Railway War Memorial | 1228742 | | Derby, Derbyshire | First World War | Sir Edwin Lutyens | Cenotaph and screen wall | 1921 | 24 February 1977 |
| Southport War Memorial | 1379604 | | Southport, Merseyside | First and Second World Wars | Grayson and Barnish | Obelisk and colonnades | 1923 | 15 November 1972 |
| South African War Memorial, Haymarket, Newcastle | 1024847 | | Newcastle upon Tyne, Tyne and Wear | Second Boer War | Thomas Eyre Macklin | Sculpture | 1907 | 12 November 1965 |
| Bolton Cenotaph | 1388289 | | Bolton, Greater Manchester | First and Second World Wars | Arthur John Hope | Cenotaph and sculptures | 1928 | 30 April 1999 |
| Trumpington War Memorial | 1245571 | | Trumpington, Cambridgeshire | First World War | Eric Gill | Cross | 1921 | 12 February 1999 |
| Manchester Cenotaph | 1270697 | | St Peter's Square, Manchester, Greater Manchester | First and Second World Wars | Sir Edwin Lutyens | Cenotaph | 1924 | 3 September 1974 |
| Earl Haig Memorial | 1066109 | | Whitehall, City of Westminster, London | First World War | Alfred Hardiman | Statue | 1936 | 5 February 1970 |
| Dover Patrol Monument | 1070067 | | Dover, Kent | First World War | Sir Aston Webb | Obelisk | 1921 | 22 August 1966 |
| Civil Service Rifles War Memorial | 1237096 | | Somerset House, City of Westminster, London | First World War | Sir Edwin Lutyens | Column | 1924 | 1 December 1987 |
| Reigate and Redhill War Memorial | 1242942 | | Redhill, Surrey | First World War | Richard Reginald Goulden | Bronze sculpture | 1923 | 18 March 2011 |
| Holy Island War Memorial | 1042308 | | Lindisfarne, Northumberland | First and Second World Wars | Sir Edwin Lutyens | Cross | 1922 | 15 May 1986 |
| British Thomson-Houston Company War Memorial | 1392027 | | Rugby, Warwickshire | First and Second World Wars | Sir Edwin Lutyens | Cross | 1921 | 13 June 2007 |
| Faversham Munitions Explosion Memorial | 1261010 | | Faversham, Kent | First World War | | Grave, cross and stone | 1917 | 27 September 1989 |
| La Délivrance | 1286880 | | Finchley, London Borough of Barnet | First World War | Émile Guillaume | Bronze sculpture | 1927 | 7 April 1983 |
| War memorial in War Memorial Park, Coventry | 1410358 | | Coventry, West Midlands | First World War | Thomas Francis Tickner | Tower | 1927 | 8 January 2013 |
| Oswaldtwistle War Memorial | 1206103 | | Oswaldtwistle, Lancashire | First and Second World Wars | Louis Frederick Roslyn | Cenotaph and statues | 1922 | 9 March 1984 |
| Bedfordshire and Hertfordshire Regimental War Memorial | 1114178 | | Kempston, Bedfordshire | First and Second World Wars | George Allen | Temple and obelisks | 1921 | 17 May 1984 |
| Stourbridge War Memorial | 1116647 | | Stourbridge, West Midlands | First World War | Ernest W Pickford | Cenotaph and sculpture | 1923 | 30 October 1939 |
| Duke of Cornwall's Light Infantry War Memorial | 1298217 | | Bodmin, Cornwall | First World War | Leonard Stanford Merrifield | Sculpture | 1924 | 7 January 1994 |
| Upper North Street School Memorial | 1065215 | | Poplar, London Borough of Tower Hamlets | First World War | A R Adams (company) | Traditional funerary sculpture | 1917 | 27 September 1973 |
| Blackpool War Memorial | 1072010 | | Blackpool, Lancashire | First and Second World Wars | Ernest Prestwich | Obelisk | 1923 | 20 October 1923 |
| Westfield War Memorial Village memorial | 1195055 | | Lancaster, Lancashire | First and Second World Wars | Jennie Delahunt | Bronze statue | 1926 | 13 March 1995 |
| Keighley War Memorial | 1313949 | | Keighley, West Yorkshire | First World War | Henry Charles Fehr | Bronze sculpture | 1924 | 4 December 1986 |
| Ashton-under-Lyne War Memorial | 1067996 | | Ashton-under-Lyne, Greater Manchester | First World War | Percy Howard | Cenotaph | 1922 | 14 July 1987 |
| Burwash War Memorial | 1376156 | | Burwash, East Sussex | First World War | Sir Charles Nicholson | Cenotaph | 1920 | 25 August 1998 |
| London and North Western Railway War Memorial | 1342044 | | Euston railway station, London Borough of Camden | First and Second World Wars | Reginald Wynn Owen | Obelisk | 1921 | 11 January 1999 |
| Macclesfield War Memorial | 1220798 | | Macclesfield, Cheshire | First World War | John Millard | Pillar and bronze sculpture | 1921 | 17 March 1977 |
| Birkenhead War Memorial | 1218058 | | Birkenhead, Merseyside | First World War | Lionel Bailey Budden | Cenotaph | 1925 | 28 March 1974 |
| Kingston upon Thames War Memorial | 1080054 | | Kingston, London Borough of Kingston upon Thames | First and Second World Wars | Richard Reginald Goulden | Pedestal with sculpture | 1923 | 6 October 1983 |
| Darwen War Memorial | 1072435 | | Darwen, Lancashire | First World War | Louis Frederick Roslyn | Cenotaph | 1921 | 27 September 1984 |
| Hythe War Memorial | 1430450 | | Hythe, Kent | First and Second World Wars | Gilbert Bayes | Sculpture | 1921 | 4 December 2015 |
| Lytham St Anne's War Memorial | 1196391 | | Lytham St Annes, Lancashire | First World War | Thomas Smith Tait | Cenotaph with sculpture | 1923 | 15 February 1993 |
| Harrow School War Memorial Building | 1358630 | | Harrow, London | First World War | Sir Herbert Baker | Memorial building | 1926 | 9 July 1968 |
| Shropshire War Memorial | 1270484 | | Shrewsbury, Shropshire | First and Second World Wars | George Hubbard | Rotunda and statue | 1922 | 17 November 1995 |
| Lichfield War Memorial | 1187733 | | Lichfield, Staffordshire | First World War | Charles Bateman | Sculpture | 1920 | 5 February 1952 |
| Ditchling War Memorial | 1438295 | | Ditchling, East Sussex | First World War | Eric Gill | Column | 1919 | 12 October 2016 |
| Newcastle and District War Memorial | 1115605 | | Newcastle-upon-Tyne, Tyne and Wear | First World War | James Thoburn Cackett and Robert Burns Dick | Sculpture | 1923 | 12 November 1965 |
| Queen's Own Royal West Kent Regiment Cenotaph | 1086395 | | Maidstone, Kent | First and Second World Wars | Sir Edwin Lutyens | Cenotaph | 1921 | 2 August 1974 |
| Huddersfield War Memorial | 1427679 | | Huddersfield, West Yorkshire | First and Second World Wars | Sir Charles Nicholson | Cross and colonnade | 1924 | 14 October 2015 |
| Norwich War Memorial | 1051857 | | Norwich, Norfolk | First and Second World Wars | Sir Edwin Lutyens | Stone of Remembrance | 1927 | 30 September 1983 |
| Machine Gun Corps Memorial | 1226874 | | Hyde Park Corner, City of Westminster, London | First World War | Francis Derwent Wood | Sculpture | 1925 | 5 February 1970 |
| Lewes High Street War Memorial | 1191738 | | Lewes, East Sussex | First and Second World Wars | Vernon March | Sculpture | 1924 | 29 October 1985 |
| Busbridge War Memorial | 1044531 | | Busbridge, Surrey | First and Second World Wars | Sir Edwin Lutyens | Cross | 1922 | 1 February 1991 |
| Bournemouth War Memorial | 1418017 | | Bournemouth, Dorset | First and Second world Wars | Albert Edward Shervey | Memorial stone | 1922 | 12 March 2014 |
| Belgian Monument to the British Nation | 1066168 | | Victoria Embankment, City of Westminster, London | First World War | Sir Reginald Blomfield | Sculpture | 1920 | 5 February 1970 |
| 29th Division War Memorial | 1034880 | | Stretton-on-Dunsmore, Warwickshire | First World War | Robert Bridgeman and Sons | Obelisk | 1921 | 25 August 1987 |
| Royal Berkshire Regiment Cenotaph | 1321912 | | Reading, Berkshire | First and Second World Wars | Sir Edwin Lutyens | Cenotaph | 1921 | 22 December 1975 |
| Royal Naval Division War Memorial | 1392454 | | Horse Guards Parade, City of Westminster, London | First World War | Sir Edwin Lutyens | Obelisk and fountain | 1925 | 6 March 2008 |
| Southend-on-Sea War Memorial | 1322329 | | Southend-on-Sea, Essex | First and Second World Wars | Sir Edwin Lutyens | Obelisk | 1921 | 23 August 1974 |
| War memorial at St Wulfram's Church, Grantham | 1062502 | | Grantham, Lincolnshire | First and Second World Wars | Sir Charles Nicholson, Bt | Cross | 1920 | 20 April 1972 |
| Exeter City War Memorial | 1420669 | | Northernhay Gardens, Exeter, Devon | First and Second World Wars | John Angel | Sculpture | 1923 | 8 September 2014 |
| The Cavalry Memorial | 1278118 | | Hyde Park Corner, City of Westminster, London | First World War | Adrian Jones | Sculpture | 1924 | 1 December 1987 |
| Memorial Cross at St George's Church, Deal | 1425375 | | Deal, Kent | First World War | Unknown | Cross | 1916 | 11 March 2015 |
| War memorial cloisters at Sedbergh School | 1384218 | | Sedbergh, Cumbria | First and Second World Wars | Sir Hubert Worthington | Cloisters | 1924 | 14 June 1984 |
| Worksop War Memorial | 1045751 | | Worksop, Nottinghamshire | First World War | A. H. Richardson | Cenotaph | 1925 | 1 April 1985 |
| York City War Memorial | 1257512 | | York, North Yorkshire | First and Second World Wars | Sir Edwin Lutyens | Cross | 1925 | 10 September 1970 |
| Retford War Memorial | 1392660 | | Retford, Nottinghamshire | First and Second World Wars | Leonard W Barnard | Cross | 1921 | 23 July 2008 |
| Lancashire Fusiliers War Memorial | 1250814 | | Gallipoli Gardens, Bury, Greater Manchester | First World War | Sir Edwin Lutyens | Obelisk | 1922 | 2 September 1992 |
| Briantspuddle War Memorial | 1171702 | | Briantspuddle, Dorset | First World War | Eric Gill | Obelisk | 1918 | 2 October 1984 |
| Stanway War Memorial | 1154209 | | Stanway, Gloucestershire | First World War | Alexander Fisher | Bronze sculpture | 1920 | 7 September 1987 |
| Elveden War Memorial | 1037610 | | Eriswell, Suffolk | First and Second World Wars | Clyde Francis Young | Corinthian column | 1921 | 7 May 1954 |
| Accrington War Memorial | 1205791 | | Accrington, Lancashire | First World War | Sir Charles Herbert Reilly | Obelisk | 1922 | 09 March 1984 |
| Barnsley War Memorial | 1151144 | | Barnsley, South Yorkshire | First and Second World Wars | William Thomas Curtis | Cenotaph | 1925 | 13 January 1986 |
| The City and County of London Troops War Memorial | 1064714 | | Cornhill, City of London | First World War | Sir Aston Webb | Cenotaph | 1920 | 5 June 1972 |
| Boer War Memorial, Cannon Hill Park | 1392586 | | Birmingham, West Midlands | Second Boer War | Albert Toft | Sculpture | 1906 | 14 May 2008 |
| Portsmouth War Memorial | 1104318 | | Portsmouth, Hampshire | First World War | JS Gibson | Screen with plaques | 1921 | 25 September 1972 |
| Royal Gloucestershire Hussars Yeomanry War Memorial | 1245906 | | Gloucester, Gloucestershire | First and Second World Wars | Cash and Wright | Cross | 1922 | 15 December 1998 |
| Sheffield War Memorial | 1271299 | | Sheffield, South Yorkshire | First and Second World Wars | Charles Carus-Wilson | Flagstaff | 1925 | 28 June 1973 |
| Rifle Brigade War Memorial | 1288744 | | Grosvenor Gardens, City of Westminster, London | First and Second World Wars | John Tweed | Sculpture | 1925 | 14 January 1970 |
| Rawtenstall Cenotaph | 1072780 | | Rawtenstall, Lancashire | First and Second World Wars | Louis Frederick Roslyn | Cenotaph | 1929 | 30 November 1984 |
| 2nd Battalion, Royal Sussex Regiment Memorial | 1043677 | | Eastbourne, East Sussex | Service from 1882 to 1902, in Malta, Egypt, India and Boer War | Sir William Goscombe John | Statue | 1906 | 17 May 1971 |
| Rowntree Park Memorial Gates | 1256477 | | York, North Yorkshire | Second World War | | Gates | Early 18th century | 24 June 1983 |
| Royal Artillery Boer War Memorial | 1273903 | | The Mall, City of Westminster, London | Second Boer War | Aston Webb and William Robert Colton | Cenotaph | 1910 | 31 October 2016 |
| South Harting War Memorial | 1438494 | | South Harting, West Sussex | First World War | Eric Gill | Cross | 1920 | 11 October 2016 |
| Oldham War Memorial | 1210137 | | Oldham, Greater Manchester | First and Second World Wars | Thomas Taylor | Bronze sculpture | 1923 | 23 January 1973 |
| Colchester War Memorial | 1391704 | | Colchester, Essex | First World War | Henry Charles Fehr | Bronze sculpture | 1923 | 7 July 2006 |
| National Submariners' War Memorial | 1079109 | | Victoria Embankment, City of London | First World War | Ryan Tenison | Bronze sculpture | 1922 | 5 June 1972 |
| West Derby War Memorial | 1389376 | | Prescot, Liverpool, Merseyside | First World War | Walter Gilbert and Louis Weingartner | Bronze sculptures on pedestal | 1922 | 15 August 2001 |
| Blackmoor War Memorial | 1174603 | | Blackmoor, Hampshire | First World War | Sir Herbert Baker and Sir Charles Wheeler | Cross | 1922 | 15 August 2001 |
| Lenton War Memorial | 1246782 | | Lenton, Nottingham | First World War | Possibly Arthur Brewill and Basil Baily | Cross | 1919 | 30 November 1995 |
| Burnley War Memorial | 1247303 | | Burnley, Lancashire | First World War | Walter Gilbert and Louis Weingartner | Cenotaph | 1926 | 19 November 1997 |
| Burton upon Trent war memorial | 1288788 | | Burton-on-Trent, Staffordshire | First World War | Henry Charles Fehr | Bronze statue on plinth | 1922 | 22 June 1979 |
| Cumberland and Westmorland War Memorial | 1291971 | | Carlisle, Cumbria | First and Second World Wars | Sir Robert Lorimer | Cenotaph | 1927 | 11 April 1994 |
| Bisham War Memorial | 1117603 | | Bisham, Berkshire | First and Second World Wars | Eric Gill | Calvary | 1919 | 22 September 1987 |
| Watford Peace Memorial | 1348116 | | Watford, Hertfordshire | First World War | Mary Pownall Bromet | Bronze sculptures | 1928 | 7 January 1983 |
| Royal Fusiliers War Memorial | 1064638 | | High Holborn, City of London | First World War | Albert Toft | Bronze sculpture on plinth | 1922 | 5 June 1972 |
| Great Dunmow War Memorial | 1438524 | | Great Dunmow, Essex | First World War | Basil Oliver and George Clausen | Obelisk | 1921 | 14 October 2016 |
| Croydon Cenotaph | 1268438 | | Croydon, London Borough of Croydon | First and Second World Wars | James Burford and Paul Raphael Montford | Cenotaph | 1921 | 19 November 1973 |
| People of Dover war memorial | 1406098 | | Dover, Kent | First World War | Richard Reginald Goulden | Bronze statue | 1924 | 9 January 2012 |
| Crompton War Memorial | 1068100 | | Shaw and Crompton, Greater Manchester | First World War | Richard Reginald Goulden | Bronze statue | 1923 | 6 October 1987 |
| Crich Stand (Sherwood Foresters Regimental Memorial) | 1072594 | | Crich, Derbyshire | First World War | Lt-Col. Brewill | Tower | 1923 | 15 October 1997 |
| St Michael Cornhill War Memorial | 1439646 | | St Michael, Cornhill, City of London | First World War | Richard Reginald Goulden | Bronze statue | 1920 | 1 December 2016 |
| Hatfield War Memorial | 1445906 | | Hatfield, Hertfordshire | First World War | Herbert Baker | Cross | 1921 | 16 May 2017 |
| Harrogate War Memorial | 1446943 | | Harrogate, North Yorkshire | First and Second World War | Ernest Prestwich | Cenotaph | 1923 | 14 June 2017 |
| Bury War Memorial | 1444845 | | Bury, Greater Manchester | First World War | Sir Reginald Blomfield | Cross of Sacrifice | 1924 | 7 April 2017 |
| King's Royal Rifle Corps War Memorial, Winchester | 1447365 | | Winchester, Hampshire | First World War | John Tweed | Bronze sculpture | 1920 | 27 July 2017 |
| Hampshire, Isle of Wight and Winchester War Memorial | 1445852 | | Winchester, Hampshire | First World War | Herbert Baker | Cross | 1921 | 16 May 2017 |
| County of Kent War Memorial Cross | 1446080 | | Canterbury, Kent | First World War | Herbert Baker | Cross | 1921 | 16 May 2017 |
| Edgar Mobbs War Memorial, Northampton | 1447457 | | Northampton, Northamptonshire | First World War | Alfred Turner | Bronze statue on plinth | 1921 | 27 July 2017 |
| Matlock Bath War Memorial | 1451237 | | Matlock Bath, Derbyshire | First World War | James Beresford & Sons | Cenotaph with stone sculpture | 1921 | 12 February 2018 |
| Twickenham War Memorial | 1445040 | | Radnor Gardens, Twickenham, London Borough of Richmond upon Thames | First World War | Mortimer John Brown | Bronze sculpture on plinth | 1921 | 5 April 2017 |
| Royal Air Force Memorial | 1066171 | | Victoria Embankment, City of Westminster, London | First and Second World Wars | Sir Reginald Blomfield | Bronze eagle on plinth | 1923 | 23 March 2018 |
| Bootle War Memorial | 1283634 | | Bootle, Sefton, Merseyside | First and Second World Wars | Joseph Hermon Cawthra | Bronze statues on obelisk | 1922 | 23 March 2018 |
| St Saviour's War Memorial | 1378368 | | Borough High Street, London Borough of Southwark | First World War | Philip Lindsey Clark | Bronze statue on plinth | 1922 | 23 March 2018 |
| Memorial to the Home of Aviation | 1258069 | | Eastchurch, Kent | First World War | Sidney Loweth | Screen | 1955 | 23 March 2018 |
| Pearl Centre War Memorial | 1462803 | | Peterborough, Cambridgeshire | First and Second World Wars | George Frampton | Bronze statue | 1919 | 19 March 2019 |
| War Memorial at All Souls' Church, Blackman Lane, Leeds | 1255888 | | Leeds, West Yorkshire | First World War | | Calvary | 1921 | 26 September 1963 |
| War Memorial at Holy Trinity Church, Newcastle-under-Lyme | 1196759 | | Newcastle-under-Lyme, Staffordshire | First and Second World Wars | | Cross | 1921 | 21 October 1949 |
| War Memorial at Congress House | 1113223 | | Great Russell Street, London Borough of Camden | First and Second World Wars | Jacob Epstein | Sculpture | 1958 | 29 March 1988 |
| Polish Air Force Memorial | 1088113 | | Western Avenue, Ruislip, London Borough of Hillingdon | Second World War | Mieczysław Lubelski | Obelisk and screen walls | 1948 | 30 August 2002 |

== See also ==
- Grade I listed war memorials in England
