= Grade II* listed buildings in Folkestone and Hythe =

The district of Folkestone and Hythe within Kent

There are a number of Grade II* listed buildings in the district of Folkestone and Hythe in Kent.

In the United Kingdom, the term listed building refers to a building or other structure officially designated as being of special architectural, historical or cultural significance; Grade II* structures are those considered to be "particularly important buildings of more than special interest". Listing was begun by a provision in the Town and Country Planning Act 1947. Listing a building imposes severe restrictions on what the owner might wish to change or modify in the structure or its fittings. In England, the authority for listing under the Planning (Listed Buildings and Conservation Areas) Act 1990 rests with English Heritage, a non-departmental public body sponsored by the Department for Culture, Media and Sport, while local authorities have a responsibility to regulate and enforce the planning regulations.

== Buildings and monuments ==
Name	Location	Type	Completed (Note: The date given is the date used by Historic England as significant for the initial building or that of an important part in the structure's description.)	Date designated	Grid ref. (Note: The grid reference is based on the British national grid reference system, sometimes known as OSGB36, used by the Ordnance Survey.) Geo-coordinates	Entry number (Note: The "List Entry Number" is a unique number assigned to each listed building and scheduled monument by Historic England.)	Image
Acrise Place and Acrise Court	Acrise	House	16th century	27 August 1952	TR1932442196; 51°08′13″N 1°08′01″E	1250981	Acrise Place and Acrise Court More images
Hoad Farm	Acrise	Farmhouse	1697 dated	27 August 1952	TR2113643106; 51°08′40″N 1°09′37″E	1251021	Upload Photo
Church of St Augustine	Snave, Brenzett	Parish Church	13th century	9 June 1959	TR0142229934; 51°02′00″N 0°52′17″E	1061152	Church of St Augustine More images
Church of St Eanswith	Brenzett	Parish Church	Late 11th century or 12th century	9 June 1959	TR0050527730; 51°00′50″N 0°51′25″E	1344185	Church of St Eanswith More images
Church of All Saints	Burmarsh	Parish Church	12th century	9 June 1959	TR1011832035; 51°02′57″N 0°59′47″E	1061163	Church of All Saints More images
Church of St Peter and St Paul	Dymchurch	Tower	1821	9 June 1959	TR1031529737; 51°01′43″N 0°59′52″E	1061130	Church of St Peter and St Paul More images
New Hall, New Hall Cottage and the Expenditors House	Dymchurch	House	Addition, probably early 19th century	9 June 1959	TR1028829702; 51°01′42″N 0°59′51″E	1061129	Upload Photo
Boyke Manor	Ottinge, Elham	Farmhouse	17th century	29 December 1966	TR1674342410; 51°08′24″N 1°05′49″E	1252276	Boyke Manor More images
Elham Manor	Elham	Continuous Jetty House	Early 16th century or earlier	29 December 1966	TR1757643935; 51°09′12″N 1°06′35″E	1253867	Elham Manor
King Post	Elham	House	18th century	29 December 1966	TR1769943898; 51°09′10″N 1°06′42″E	1260568	Upload Photo
Parsonage Farmhouse	North Elham, Elham	Farmhouse	13th century or earlier	29 December 1966	TR1817844761; 51°09′38″N 1°07′08″E	1252342	Parsonage Farmhouse More images
The Abbots Fireside Hotel and Restaurant	Elham	House	19th century	27 August 1952	TR1763443925; 51°09′11″N 1°06′38″E	1252338	The Abbots Fireside Hotel and Restaurant More images
Dean Farm	Elmsted	Farmhouse	18th century	17 October 1988	TR1246446401; 51°10′38″N 1°02′18″E	1241760	Upload Photo
Old Leigh Place	Elmsted	Farmhouse	16th century	29 December 1966	TR1316547144; 51°11′02″N 1°02′56″E	1241849	Upload Photo
Spong Farm House	Elmsted	Farmhouse	Early-mid 16th century	29 December 1966	TR1247245771; 51°10′18″N 1°02′17″E	1260301	Upload Photo
Church of the Holy Trinity	Folkestone, Folkestone	Church	1866-69	11 March 1975	TR2195035598; 51°04′36″N 1°10′02″E	1344160	Church of the Holy Trinity More images
Folkestone War Memorial	Folkestone	Monument	Unveiled 2 December 1922	24 June 2010	TR2280035755; 51°04′40″N 1°10′46″E	1393854	Folkestone War Memorial More images
Church of St Mary and St Eanswythe	Folkestone, Folkestone	Parish Church	13th century	5 December 1949	TR2295935863; 51°04′43″N 1°10′54″E	1068556	Church of St Mary and St Eanswythe More images
18 and 20, Church Street	Folkestone, Folkestone	House	18th century	5 December 1949	TR2293535926; 51°04′46″N 1°10′53″E	1356216	18 and 20, Church Street
Centuries 1 and 2, Bartholomew Street	Hythe	House	13th century	3 January 1950	TR1610934810; 51°04′19″N 1°05′00″E	1069006	Centuries 1 and 2, Bartholomew Street More images
Town Hall	Hythe	Guildhall	1794	3 January 1950	TR1618834781; 51°04′18″N 1°05′04″E	1068981	Town Hall More images
Dungeness Lighthouse	Dungeness, Lydd	Lighthouse	Designed 1957	26 March 2003	TR0929416883; 50°54′48″N 0°58′33″E	1390640	Dungeness Lighthouse More images
Lindon Hall	Lyminge	House	c. 1668, possibly with earlier core	29 December 1966	TR1626141233; 51°07′46″N 1°05′22″E	1260204	Lindon Hall
Sibton Park	Lyminge	House	c. 1602	27 August 1952	TR1587441738; 51°08′03″N 1°05′03″E	1242126	Upload Photo
French House	Lympne, Lympne	House	c. 1930	29 December 1966	TR1123234709; 51°04′22″N 1°00′50″E	1344206	Upload Photo
Port Lympne House, Stable Block, Forecourt Walls to East, and Loggia, Patio, Terrace and Shell Fountain to South	Port Lympne, Lympne	House	1912	29 December 1966	TR1021934985; 51°04′32″N 0°59′58″E	1344207	Port Lympne House, Stable Block, Forecourt Walls to East, and Loggia, Patio, Terrace and Shell Fountain to South More images
Church of St Peter	Monks Horton	Parish Church	13th century	29 December 1966	TR1234640536; 51°07′29″N 1°01′59″E	1344171	Church of St Peter More images
Kite Manor	Monks Horton	House	mid to late 16th century	27 August 1952	TR1156939883; 51°07′09″N 1°01′18″E	1061121	Kite Manor More images
St John's Priory, including the ruins of the Priory	New Romney, New Romney	House	18th century, possibly older	28 August 1951	TR0644124829; 50°59′09″N 0°56′24″E	1025316	St John's Priory, including the ruins of the Priory More images
3 and 4, West Street	New Romney, New Romney	House	c. 1400	28 August 1951	TR0625524739; 50°59′06″N 0°56′14″E	1025299	Upload Photo
Church of St Nicholas	Newington, Newington	Bell Tower	late 18th century or early 19th century	29 December 1966	TR1826437369; 51°05′39″N 1°06′56″E	1061089	Church of St Nicholas More images
Church of St Peter and St Paul, Saltwood	Saltwood	Church	1873	29 December 1966	TR1578936007; 51°04′58″N 1°04′46″E	1344199	Church of St Peter and St Paul, Saltwood More images
Spade House	Sandgate, Sandgate	House	1899	11 March 1975	TR2093535326; 51°04′29″N 1°09′09″E	1061164	Spade House More images
Church of St Dunstan	Snargate	Church	13th century	9 June 1959	TQ9906928646; 51°01′22″N 0°50′14″E	1061105	Church of St Dunstan More images
Church of St Mary	Stowting	Church	13th century	29 December 1966	TR1247641845; 51°08′11″N 1°02′09″E	1061070	Church of St Mary More images
St John's Commandery	Swingfield	Farmhouse	16th century	17 October 1988	TR2322844015; 51°09′07″N 1°11′26″E	1242361	St John's Commandery More images

== See also ==
- Grade I listed buildings in Folkestone and Hythe
