= Crimean War Memorial, Brompton Barracks =

War memorial in Kent, England

Crimean War Memorial Arch, Brompton Barracks
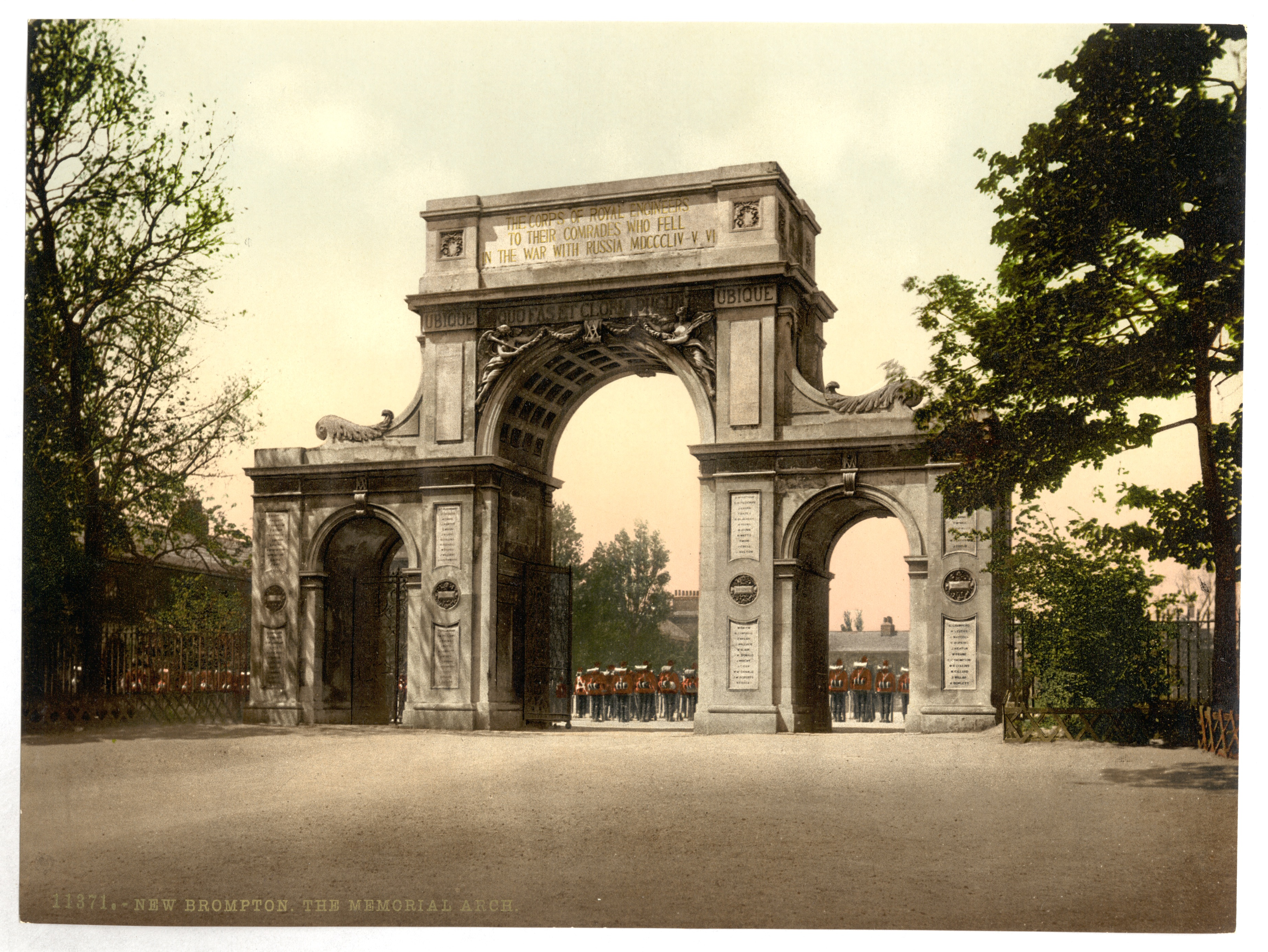
- Image of the memorial taken c. 1890–1900

- Location within Kent

General information
- Location: Pasley Road, Brompton, Kent, England
- Coordinates: 51.3932°N 0.5337°E
- Year built: 1856

Technical details
- Material: Portland stone, cast iron, bronze

Design and construction
- Architect: Sir Matthew Digby Wyatt
- Other designers: John Thomas Parry (sculptor)

Listed Building – Grade II*
- Official name: Crimean War Memorial Arch and gates, Brompton Barracks
- Designated: 8 July 1998
- Reference no.: 1375607

The Crimean War Memorial Arch is a Grade II* listed war memorial on Pasley Street in the town of Brompton, in Kent, England. It commemorates the corps of Royal Engineers who died during the Crimean War.

== History ==
The cenotaph was built after the Crimean War to commemorate local men who died in the conflict. It was designed by Sir Matthew Digby Wyatt, and sculptured by John Thomas Parry. On 8 July 1998, the Crimean War Memorial Arch was designated a Grade II* listed building.

== Design ==
The memorial is a Portland stone arch with a cast-iron gate, flanked by two arches containing lower bronze panels, a pedestrian gate, and an inscribed entablature bearing the names of those who died.

== See also ==
- Grade II* listed buildings in Medway
- Grade II* listed war memorials in England
