= Hythe Town Hall =

Municipal building in Hythe, Kent, England

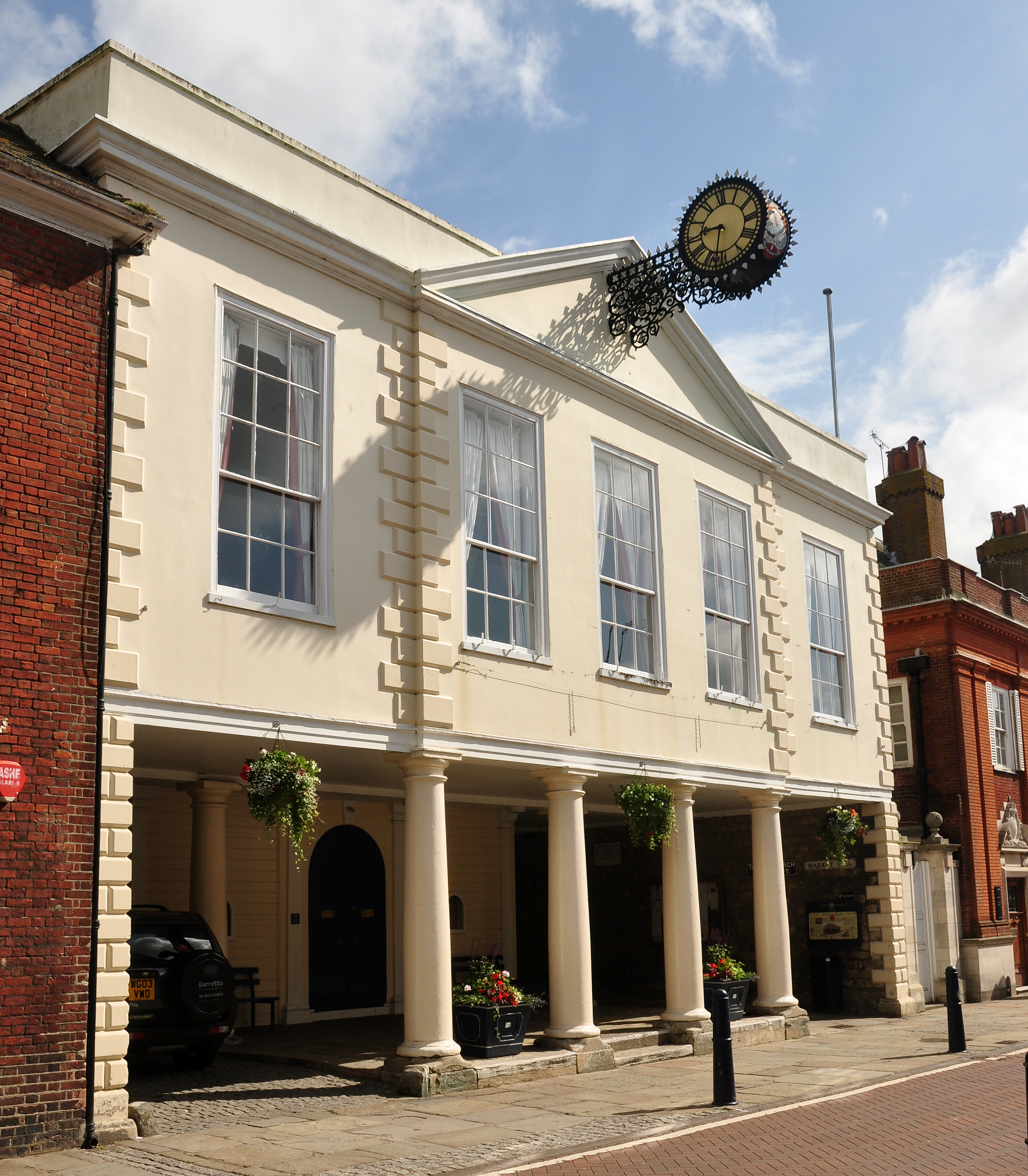
- Hythe Town Hall

- Shown in Kent
- 51.0716°N 1.0845°E
- Location: High Street, Hythe

History
- Built: 1794

Site notes
- Architect: William Tritton
- Architectural style: Neoclassical style

Listed Building – Grade II*
- Official name: The Town Hall
- Designated: 3 January 1950
- Reference no.: 1068981

Hythe Town Hall is a municipal building in the High Street, Hythe, Kent, England. The structure, which is the meeting place of Hythe Town Council, is a Grade II* listed building.

== History ==
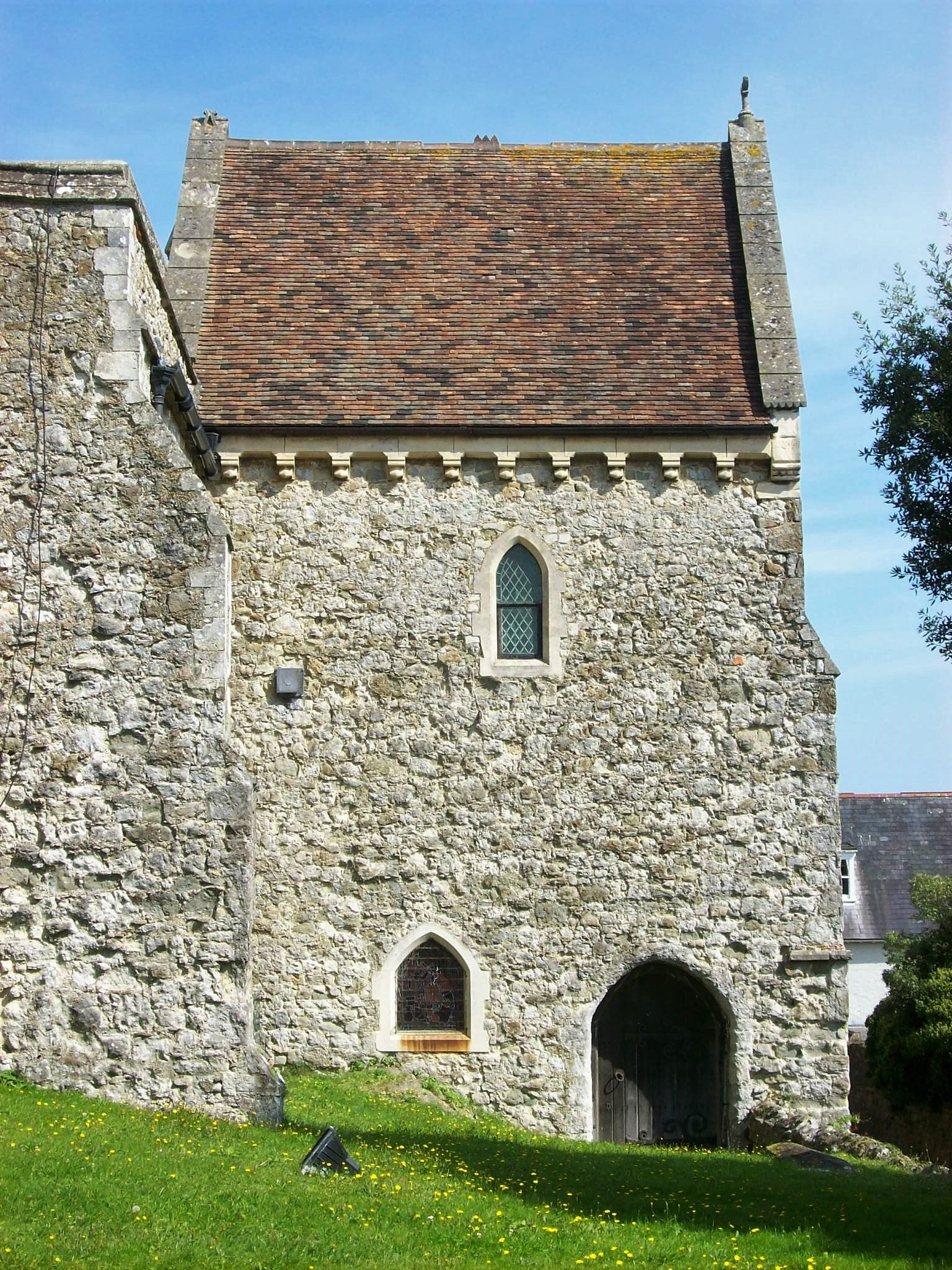
The parvise at St Leonard's Church in Hythe

The first municipal structure in Hythe was a room on the first floor of the parvise at St Leonard's Church in Hythe. The room, which was used to store the ancient records of the town, was the meeting place of the town council and the venue for the annual election of the mayor and other council members. However, as it was small, this arrangement proved inadequate and, in the late 18th century, civic leaders decided to commission a purpose-built town hall: the site they selected in the High Street had been occupied by an old court hall.

The new building was designed and built by William Tritton in the neoclassical style, constructed in brick with a stuccoed finish at a cost of £1,100 and was completed in 1794. The design involved a symmetrical main frontage with five bays facing onto the High Street; the building was arcaded on the ground floor, so that markets could be held, with a large room on the first floor. Two rows of four Tuscan order columns supported the upper part of the structure which was fenestrated with a row of sash windows on the first floor and decorated with quoins at the corners. The central section of three bays, which slightly projected forward, was surmounted by a pediment. The outer bays were wide enough to provide carriage access on the ground floor so maintaining the thoroughfare to the church behind. Internally, the principal room was the council chamber which featured a marble fireplace with Ionic order columns: it was also used as a courtroom.

After significant population growth, largely associated with the status of Hythe as a market town and sea port, the area became a municipal borough with the town hall as its headquarters in 1835. Captain William Elisha Smith, an officer in the Sherwood Foresters who commanded the School of Musketry at Hythe, invited a series of charismatic preachers to give evangelical sermons in the town hall in the 1860s. The pediment was enhanced in 1871 when a projecting clock, designed and manufactured by Henry Scott, was installed in the tympanum to celebrate Golden Jubilee of Queen Victoria. The building ceased to operate as a judicial facility after the new sessions house was opened in Bank Street in 1881.

The town hall continued to serve as the headquarters of the borough council for much of the 20th century but ceased to be the local seat of government after the enlarged Folkestone and Hythe District Council was formed in 1974. However, the town hall instead became the meeting place of Hythe Town Council. The projecting clock was restored by Smith of Derby in 2019.

Works of art in the town hall include a portrait by Sir John Lavery of the former Lord Mayor of London, Sir Charles Wakefield, (Note: Wakefield is regarded by the town council as "Hythe's greatest benefactor".) a portrait by John Raphael Smith of the former Foreign Secretary, Charles James Fox and a painting by an unknown artist depicting an East Indiaman sailing in the Sunda Strait.

== See also ==
- Grade II* listed buildings in Folkestone and Hythe
