= Folkestone War Memorial =

War memorial in Folkestone, England

Coordinates: 51.077841°N 1.179361°E

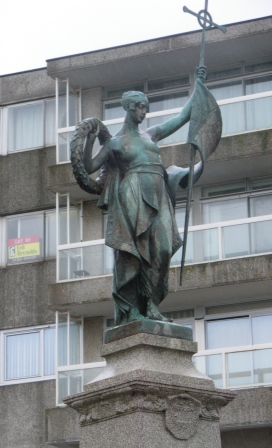
The central bronze figure of the memorial

Folkestone War Memorial is a First World War memorial situated in The Leas area of Folkestone, Kent. Designed by Ferdinand Victor Blundstone and unveiled in 1922, it commemorates the 578 men of Folkestone who served in the war, and those who passed through Folkestone Harbour when Folkestone Harbour railway station nearby was an important point of departure and return for passage to the Western Front via Boulogne. The road from the station to the harbour was renamed the "Road of Remembrance" after the war.

== Design ==
The memorial measures 25 ft (7.6 m) high and 26 ft (7.9 m) wide and comprises a bronze statue of a woman, said to represent brotherhood and reverence, standing on a tapering square stone pedestal with flanking stone walls, all on a stone base raised by two steps. The statue is bare-breasted, with its lower half robed. In her left hand, the figure holds aloft a cross with a union flag banner hanging from its shaft at half-mast, and a laurel wreath in her right hand. She faces towards the sea, and across to France beyond.

The pedestal is of Cornish granite, with the inscription picked out in gold, "MAY THEIR / DEEDS BE / HELD IN / REVERENCE". The base of the central pedestal, and the flanking walls of granite to either side, have bronze plaques. The main plaque has a low relief sculpture of ranks of soldiers moving forward, recalling the men who passed by on their way to war, with an inscription that reads:

"THANKS BE TO GOD WHO GIVETH US THE VICTORY / IN EVER GRATEFUL MEMORY OF THE BRAVE MEN FROM FOLKESTONE, / AND THE MANY THOUSANDS FROM ALL PARTS OF THE EMPIRE WHO PASSED THIS SPOT ON THEIR WAY / TO FIGHT IN THE GREAT WAR (1914-1918) FOR RIGHTEOUSNESS AND FREEDOM, AND ESPECIALLY THOSE / OF THIS TOWN WHO MADE THE SUPREME SACRIFICE, AND WHOSE NAMES ARE HERE RECORDED, / THIS MEMORIAL IS HUMBLY DEDICATED."

Other panels list the names of the dead from both World Wars. Further commemorative plaques were added after the Second World War. The memorial is now surrounded by low railings and a wall, with gates which repeat the inscription from the memorial, "MAY THEIR / DEEDS BE / HELD IN / REVERENCE".

The war memorial in Palmerston North, New Zealand, has a statue based on the design of the Folkestone memorial.

== History ==
The memorial was organised by a committee chaired by Sir Stephen Penfold, who had served as mayor of Folkestone twelve times from 1888 to 1918, including four years consecutively from 1914 to 1918. He was knighted in 1915 for his service in receiving refugees from Belgium after the outbreak of the war. His son Jeffery was killed in at the Battle of Loos on 1916.

The memorial was unveiled by Jacob Pleydell-Bouverie, 6th Earl of Radnor on 2 December 1922 and dedicated by the vicar of Folkestone, Peter Francis Tindall. A guard of honour was provided by the 1st battalion of the Oxfordshire and Buckinghamshire Light Infantry. Flowers were laid by the Mayor of Folkestone, by Colonel W J Dugan from Shorncliffe Army Camp, and by representatives from France, Belgium and Italy.

It was designated a Grade II* listed building in June 2010, and was refurbished in 2018. A new memorial arch was added nearby in 2014, unveiled by Prince Harry.

== Gallery ==
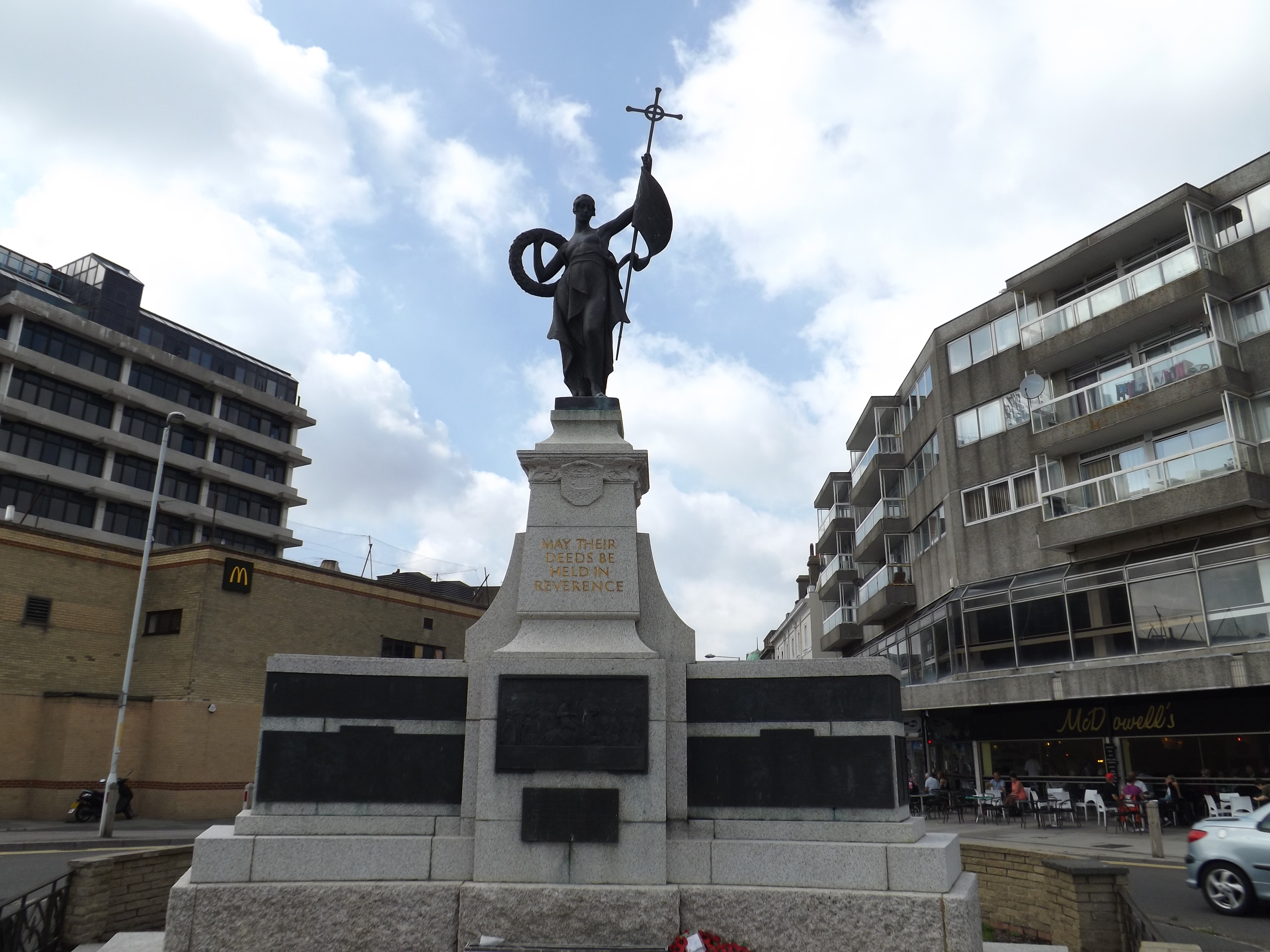
Front view of the memorial

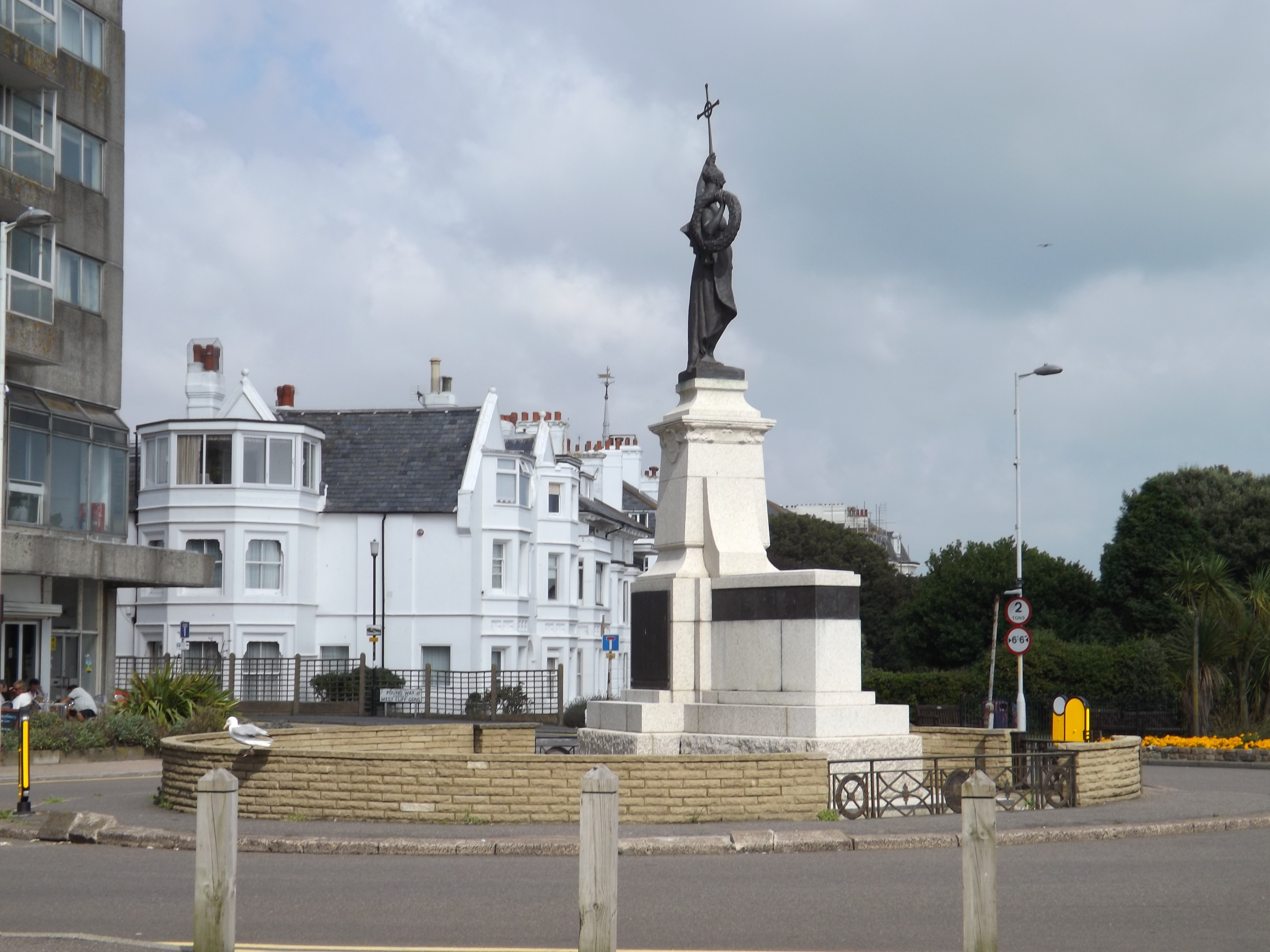
Side view of the memorial

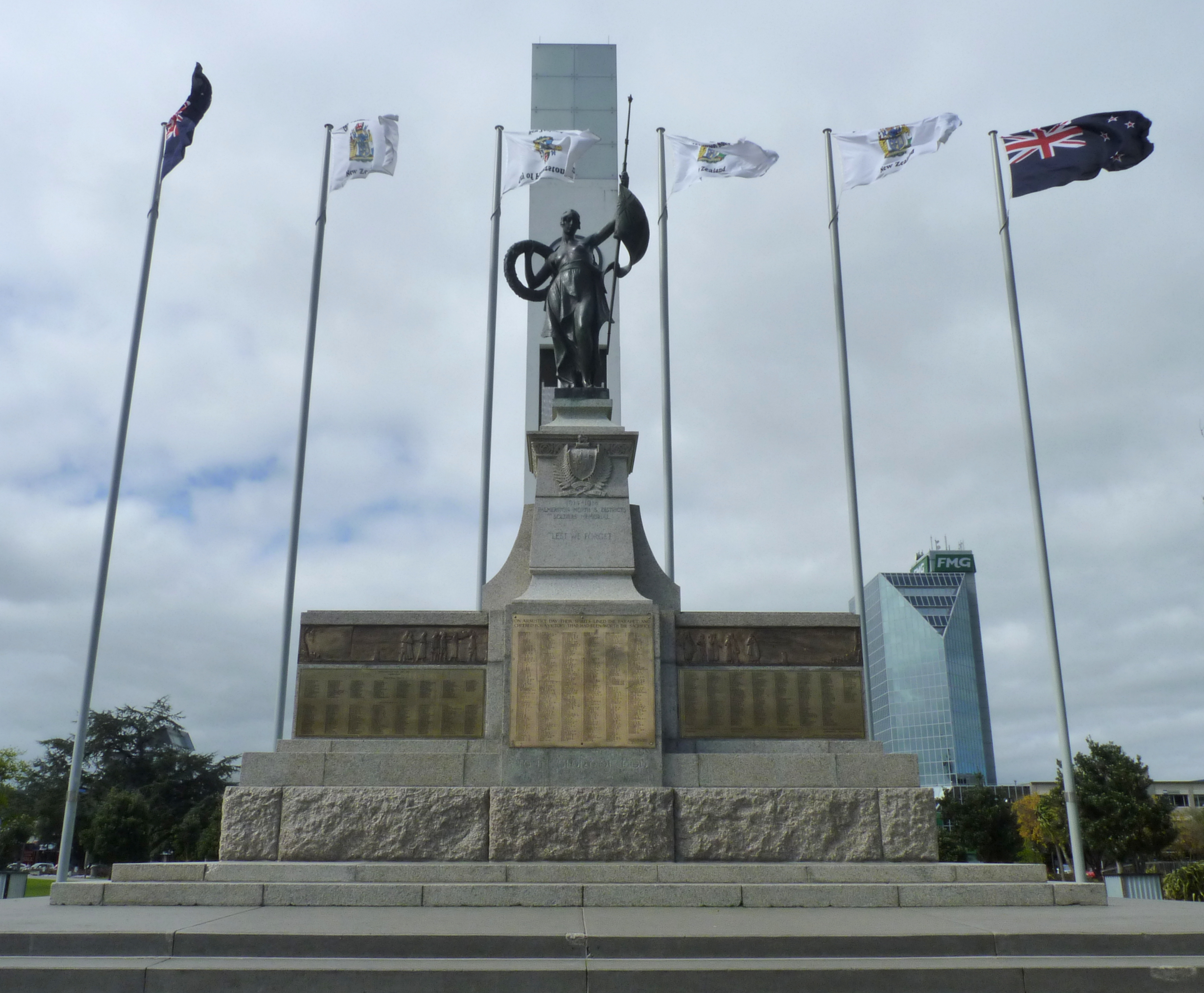
The war memorial in Palmerston North, New Zealand, based on this one

== See also ==
- Grade II* listed buildings in Folkestone and Hythe
- Grade II* listed war memorials in England
