= Stockton-on-Tees War Memorial =

War memorial in County Durham, England

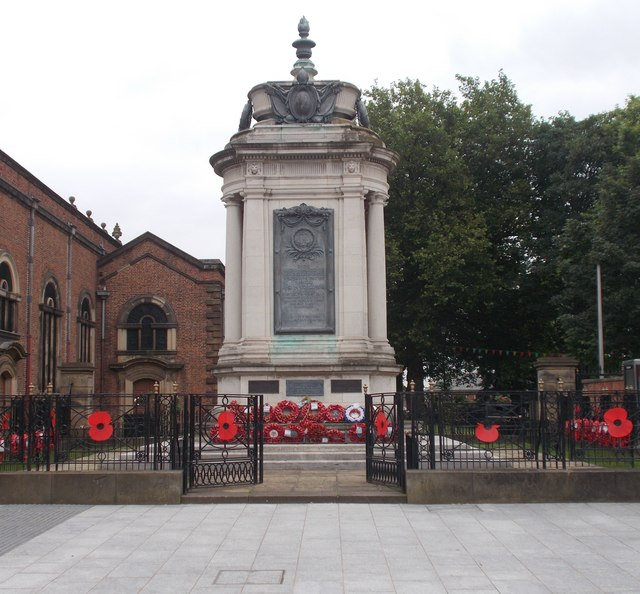
- The war memorial in 2013

- Location within England

General information
- Location: High Street, Stockton-on-Tees, England
- Coordinates: 54.5664°N 1.3125°W
- Year built: 1923
- Cost: £7,500 (equivalent to £392,118.96 in 2025)

Technical details
- Material: Portland stone, concrete, and bronze

Design and construction
- Architect: Henry Vaughan Lanchester
- Architecture firm: Messrs Fenning & London Co.

Listed Building – Grade II*
- Official name: War Memorial
- Designated: 19 January 1951
- Reference no.: 1139979

Stockton-on-Tees War Memorial is a Grade II* listed war memorial on High Street in the town of Stockton-on-Tees, in County Durham, England. It commemorates the men of Stockton-on-Tees who lost their lives during the First World War.

== History ==
The cenotaph was commissioned after the First World War to honour local men who died in the conflict, and raised by a public subscription from the mayor. It was designed by Henry Vaughan Lanchester. The memorial was unveiled on 31 May 1923 at a cost of £7,500, by John Frederick Lambton, Earl of Durham. It was dedicated by the Bishop of Durham, and rededicated on 11 May 1997. On 19 January 1951, the Stockton-on-Tees War Memorial was designated a Grade II* listed building.

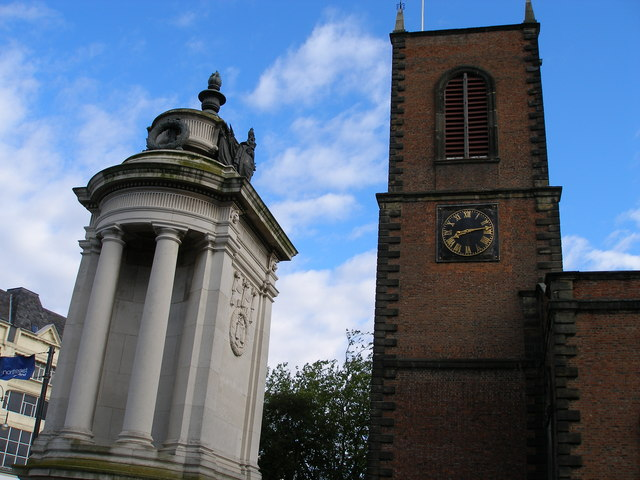
Side view of the war memorial (left), and west tower of St Thomas's parish church (right)

== Design ==
The memorial is the form of an base made from concrete, and a Portland stone cenotaph rising to approximately 9.14 metres (30.0 feet). There are framing pilasters of sides with have some lions masks above. sarcophagus with fluted sides at top, with trophies and wreaths on each side, and surmounted by bronze torches and stone pedestals.

== See also ==
- Grade II* listed war memorials in England
