= Swingfield Preceptory =

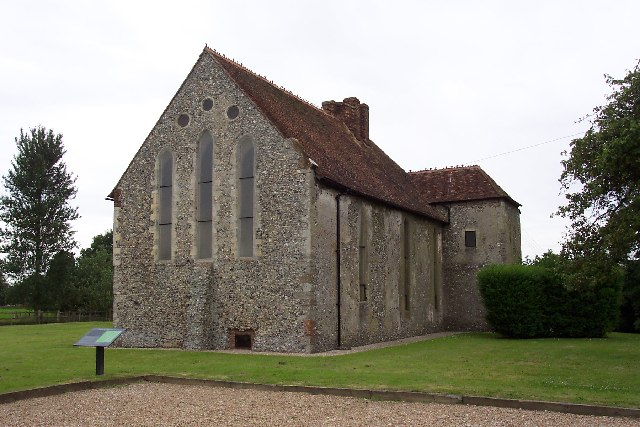

- St Johns Commandery location in Kent
- 51.1518°N 1.1906°E
- OS grid reference: TR2322844015

History
- Built: 13th Century
- Built for: Order of St. John of Jerusalem

Site notes
- Restored: 1972-4
- Governing body: English Heritage

Listed Building
- Official name: St John's Commandery
- Type: Grade II*
- Designated: 17 October 1988
- Reference no.: 1242361

Swingfield Preceptory (or St John's Commandery, Swingfield) was a priory about 5 miles north of Folkestone, Kent on the south coast of England.

== History ==
The Preceptory (headquarters of certain orders of monastic knights) was taken over by the Knights Hospitaller in 1180 after sisters of the same order were moved to Buckland Priory. It was suppressed during the Dissolution of the Monasteries and leased on 16 March 1541 to John Thorgood and Thomas Horseley for twenty-one years. It then passed through many families (including Sir Anthony Aucher, Sir Henry Palmer, of Wingham and Sir Thomas Palmer, 4th Baronet, of Wingham).

The 13th-century St John's Chapel still survives on Swanton Lane and is under the care of English Heritage.

== Architecture ==
It was originally built between the 13th and 16th centuries as a farmhouse of flint, which has been knapped in places. It also has stone quoins and dressings. The west gable end is tile-hung on both floors. The north elevation retains areas of render painted and is scored to resemble red brick in Flemish bond.
