= Centuries, Hythe =

House in Hythe, Kent, UK

Coordinates: 51°4′18.6″N 1°5′0″E

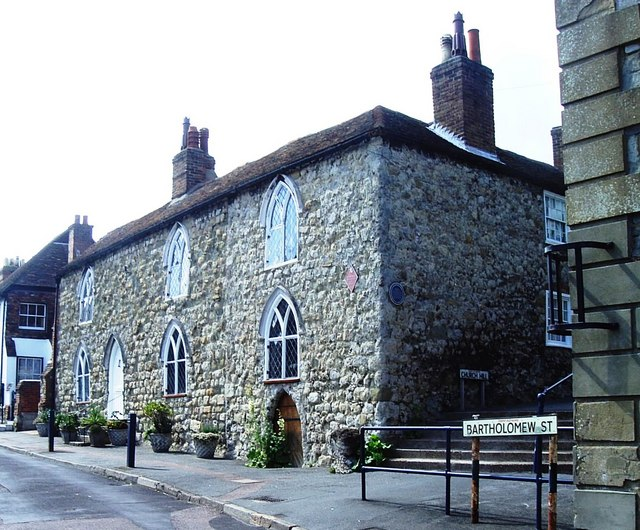
The building in 2007

Centuries is a house in Hythe, Kent, built in the 13th century, possibly earlier. It is the birthplace of Hamo Hethe, b.1275, who became the Bishop of Rochester in 1319. In 1685 it became St. Bartholomew's Hospital, for between ten and thirteen people, until 1949; from 1951 it has been divided into two private flats. The house is currently listed on the Statutory List of Buildings of Special Architectural or Historic Interest as Grade II*, (Note: Buildings are given one of three grades: Grade I for buildings of exceptional interest, Grade II* for particularly important buildings of more than special interest and Grade II for buildings that are of special interest.) and is on the corner of Church Hill and Bartholomew Street in Hythe.

== Details ==
The original house was built in the 13th century, possibly earlier, by a family named Noble, believed to be Hamo's ancestors. The two story structure with a large cellar is built of local rag-stone and was, at that time, in a preeminent location on the docks in Hythe, on the corner of the 12th century road to Canterbury called Clyme Hill, via Saltwood Castle. Built of Kentish rag-stone and wide-joined rubble, the simple two story structure had an exterior staircase made of wood on the east side. The cellar, with its door facing the docks, was used for storage and trade while the ground floor and first floor were living areas. It is likely that the original cellar door and south-facing windows had rounded arches in the Norman style, that were adapted to the Gothic style at the time of the western addition. There is a large stone that goes several feet into the ground on the southeast corner of the building which is most likely a mooring Bollard.

In 1335 the west wing extension was added along the quayside on Duck Lane, by Hamo de Hethe, by then Bishop of Rochester. He continued to use the house as a summer residence. The west wing is built of roughly squared sandstone rubble with simple Gothic arched windows and a central door which leads, still today, through a stone floored passage that exits in the back garden. The exterior wooden steps were removed and an interior staircase built, from the cellar up to the ground and first floors. Upon entering the cellar there is an ancient Ambry built into the stone wall, which would have been used for storage objects of a religious nature, holy waters, and the like. The final addition to the house was in 1811, extending the rooms to number sixteen in all. The house remained owned by the church until 1949.

the house has been listed on the national heritage list for England and has been designated as Grade II* since 1950.
