= Stalybridge War Memorial =

War memorial in Greater Manchester, England

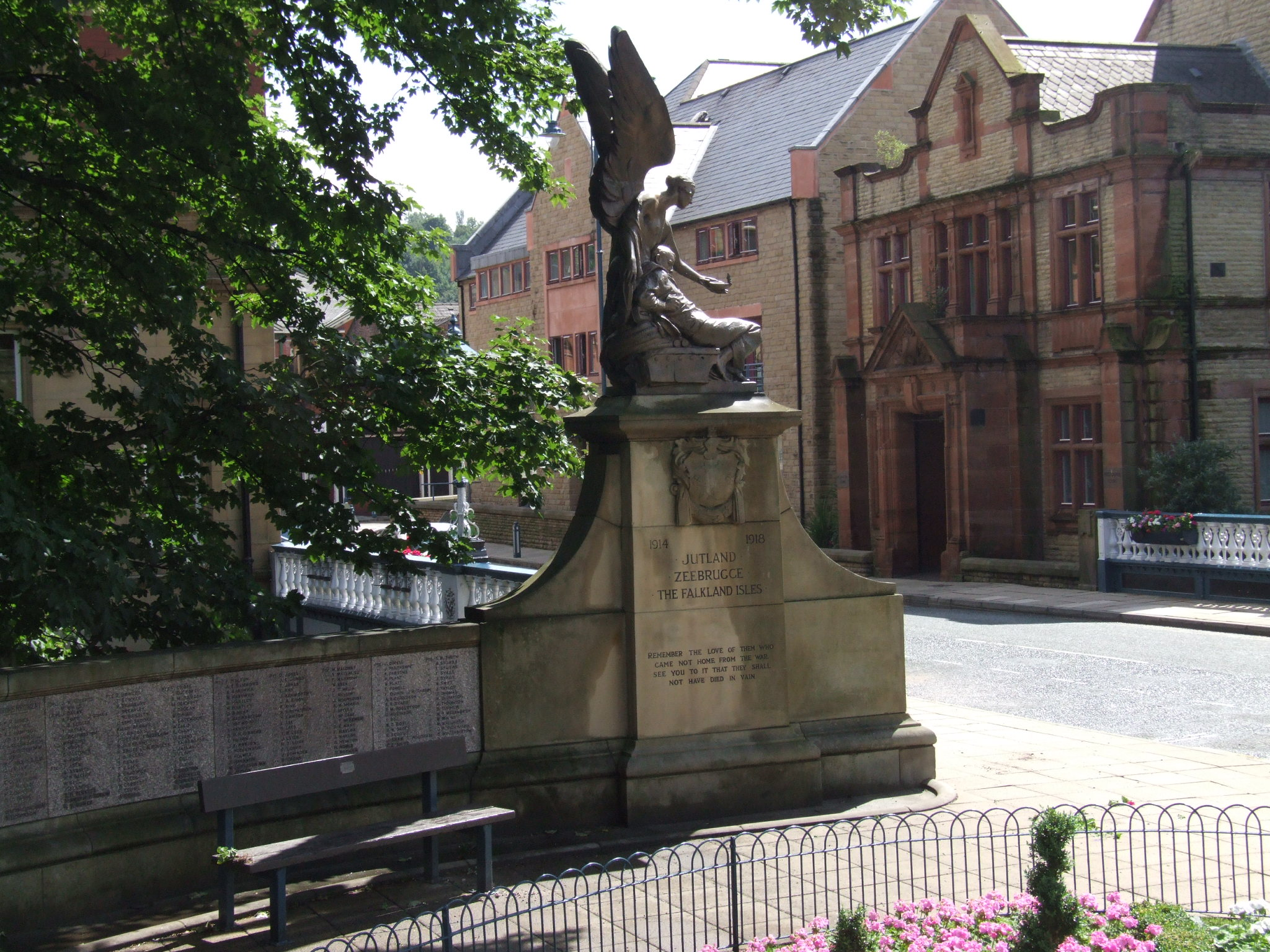
- Stalybridge War Memorial in 2008

- Location within Greater Manchester

General information
- Location: Trinity Street, Stalybridge, Greater Manchester, England
- Coordinates: 53.4837°N 2.0566°W
- Year built: c. 1921
- Renovated: 1950 (extended)

Design and construction
- Architect: Ferdinand Blundstone
- Other designers: Ferdinand Blundstone (sculptor)
- Main contractor: William Kirkpatrick Ltd.

Listed Building – Grade II*
- Official name: War Memorial
- Designated: 6 February 1986
- Reference no.: 1163074

Stalybridge War Memorial is a Grade II* listed monument at the northern end of Trinity Street in Stalybridge, a town within Tameside, Greater Manchester, England. It commemorates the men of Stalybridge who lost their lives during the First and Second World Wars. The memorial occupies both sides of Victoria Bridge over the River Tame.

== History ==
Plans for the memorial were initiated in 1919 following the end of the First World War. A public appeal raised £6,000—well above the estimated cost of £4,200—with surplus funds allocated to the education of children of fallen servicemen. The memorial was designed and sculpted by Ferdinand Blundstone, a noted sculptor and native of nearby Whaley Bridge, who exhibited at the Royal Academy and worked internationally. Construction was carried out by Messrs William Kirkpatrick Ltd of Trafford Park.

The memorial was unveiled on 6 November 1921 in a ceremony attended by approximately 24,000 people, nearly the entire population of Stalybridge at the time. Initially it bore the names of 628 men who died in the First World War, later rising to 665 with additions.

A Second World War extension, bearing the names of 127 men, was unveiled on 23 April 1950, attended by 3,000–4,000 people. The first wreath was laid by alderman L. Harris, the mayor of Stalybridge, followed by Lord Leverhulme, the Lord Lieutenant of Cheshire.

On 6 February 1986, Stalybridge War Memorial was designated a Grade II* listed building for its architectural and historic significance.

The memorial remains on its original site and continues to serve as the centrepiece for annual Remembrance Day ceremonies. Conservation efforts are ongoing, and local campaigns have sought to add names of approximately 300 soldiers omitted from the original Roll of Honour.

== Design and features ==
The memorial occupies both sides of Victoria Bridge at the entrance to Trinity Street, extending across the roadway. Its arrangement creates a gateway-like composition and functions as a civic monument associated with public commemoration.

At the centre of the design are two main pedestals, each approximately 10 feet (3 m) in height and surmounted by bronze sculptural groups. On the left side an angel supports a sailor whose cap bears the name Good Hope, and on the right side an angel supports a soldier. Each bronze figure is around 8 feet (2.4 m) in height. The right pedestal also carries Stalybridge's coat of arms in stone. Segmental wing walls extend from the pedestals and curve outward, terminating in secondary piers topped with crouching stone lions.

Polished granite plaques are set into the wing walls, bearing the Roll of Honour with the names of those who died, arranged by regiment: 665 from the First World War and 127 from the Second World War. The base of the memorial is finished with a decorative border of fluorite spar and a low kerb, forming a defined area at the foot of the structure.

The memorial measures about 110 feet (34 m) from wing to wing, with the wing walls approximately 5 feet (1.5 m) in height.

The Second World War extension is connected by bronze railings, which also incorporate the town's coat of arms.

=== Inscriptions ===
The memorial incorporates a series of inscriptions referencing theatres of war, naval engagements, and dedicatory phrases. On the left lion pedestal, the panels list France, Palestine, Mesopotamia, Egypt, and East Africa. The naval pedestal bears the inscription "GOOD HOPE / 1914–1918," along with the names of major actions: Jutland, Zeebrugge, and The Falkland Isles. Beneath these are the words:

REMEMBER THE LOVE OF THEM WHO
CAME NOT HOME FROM THE WAR
SEE YOU TO IT THAT THEY SHALL
NOT HAVE DIED IN VAIN

The army pedestal carries the dates "1914–1918" and the names of significant battles: The Marne, Ypres, and The Somme. Its dedicatory inscription reads:

ALL YOU WHO PASS BY
REMEMBER WITH GRATITUDE
THE MEN OF STALYBRIDGE
WHO DIED FOR YOU

The right lion pedestal carries the dates "1939–1945" and the panels record additional theatres of war: Flanders, Gallipoli, Salonika, Italy, and South West Africa. Its dedicatory inscription, taken from Katharine Tynan's 1915 poem Flower of Youth, reads:

NOW HEAVEN IS BY THE YOUNG INVADED.
THEIR LAUGHTER'S IN THE HOUSE OF GOD

The railings of the Second World War extension include the inscription: "May their deeds be held in reverence." To the right of the railings is a tablet bearing the inscription:

1939–1945
ON LAND, ON SEA, AND IN THE AIR.
AT HOME AND ABROAD.

== Gallery ==
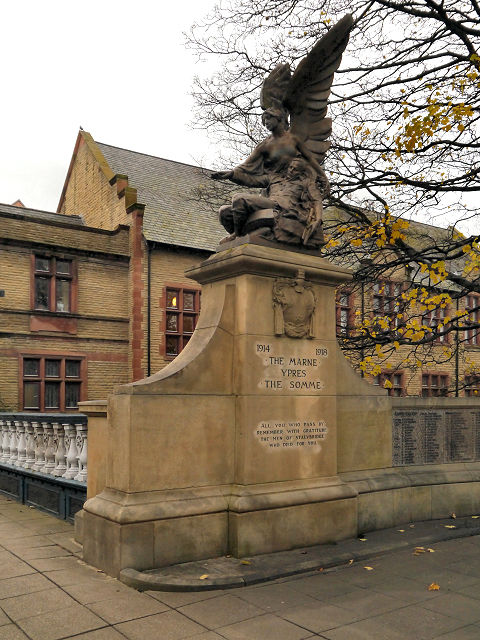
Pedestal with angel and soldier

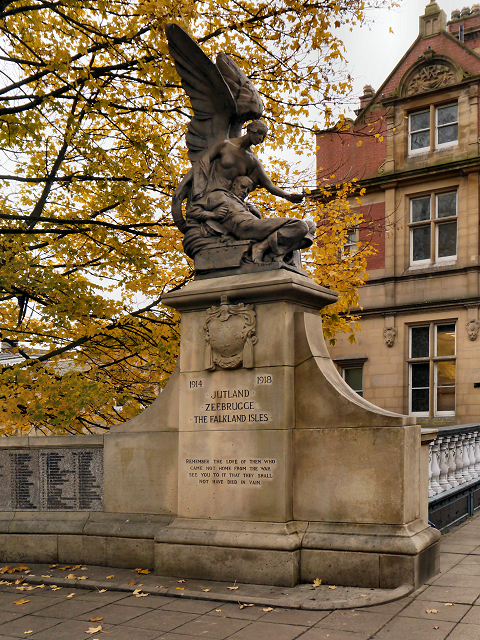
Pedestal with angel and sailor

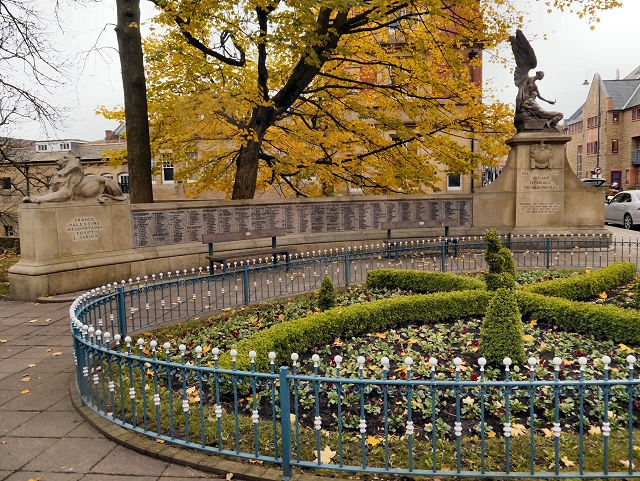
Left wing wall with granite plaques

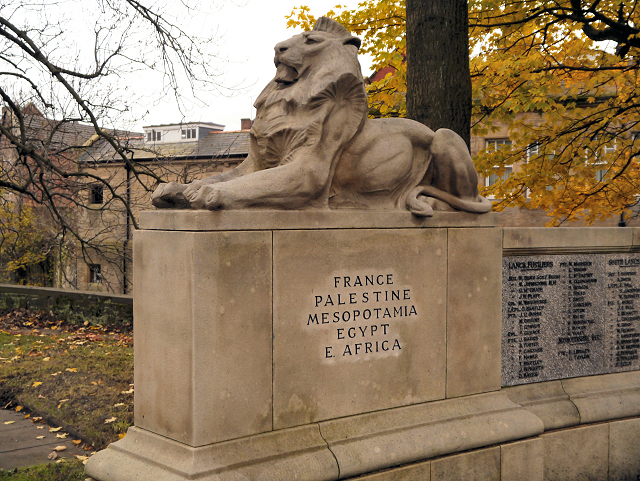
Left lion pedestal and inscription

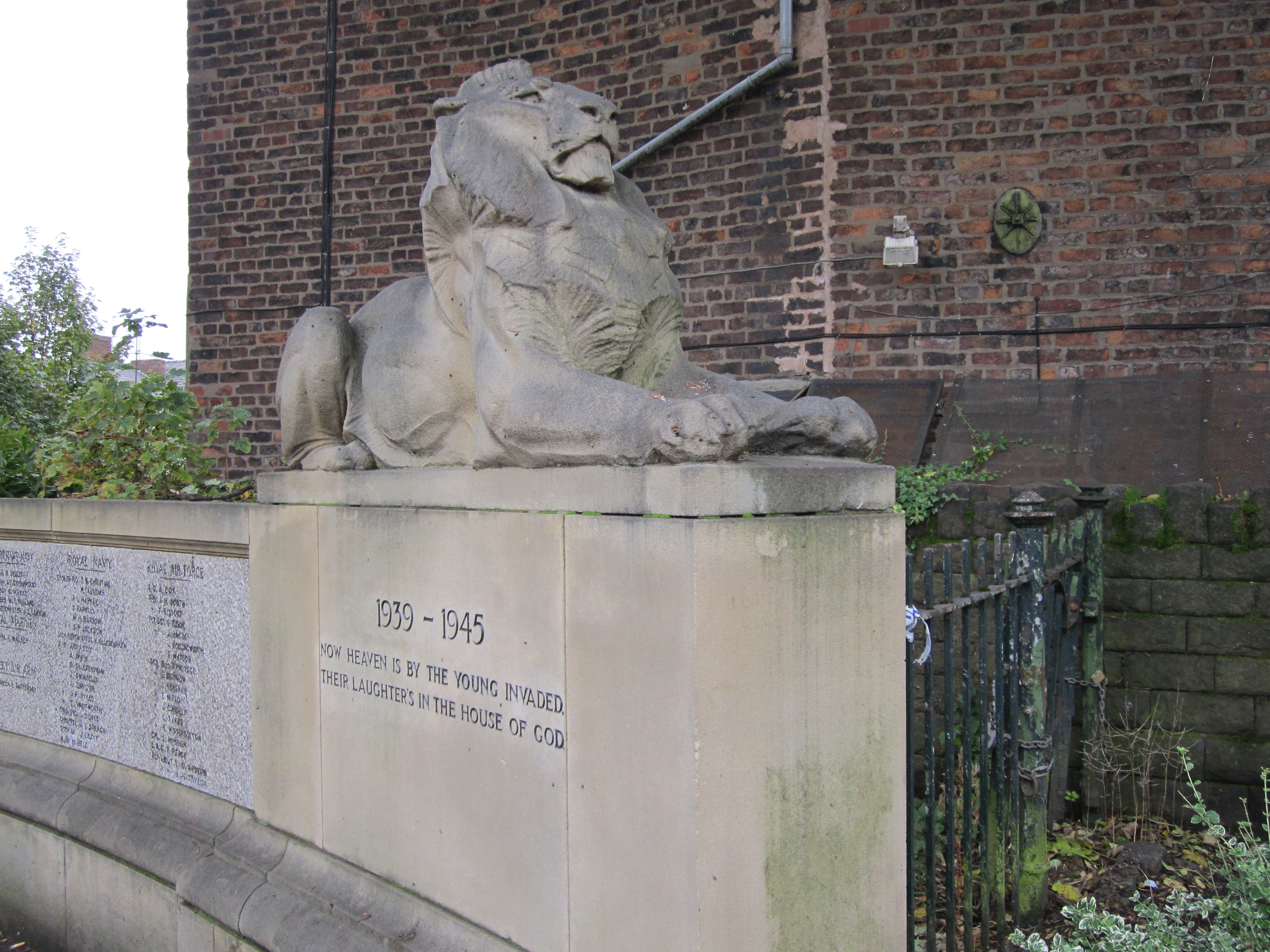
Right lion pedestal and inscription

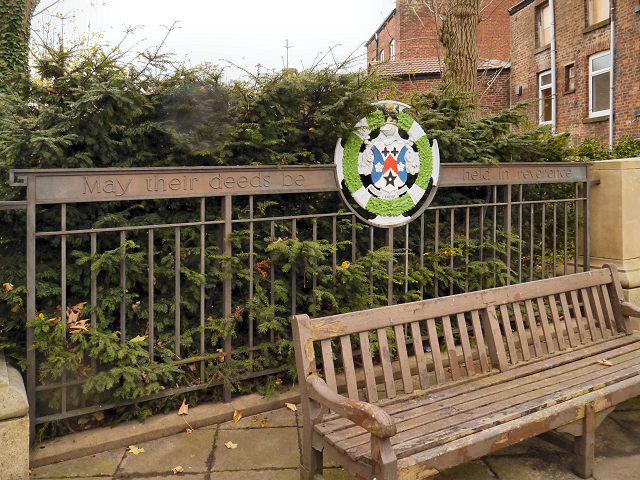
Inscription on railings

== See also ==
- Grade II* listed buildings in Greater Manchester
- Listed buildings in Stalybridge
