= Jennie Delahunt =

English sculptor and teacher

Jennie H Delahunt (April 1877 – 1954) was an English sculptor and teacher.

== Biography ==
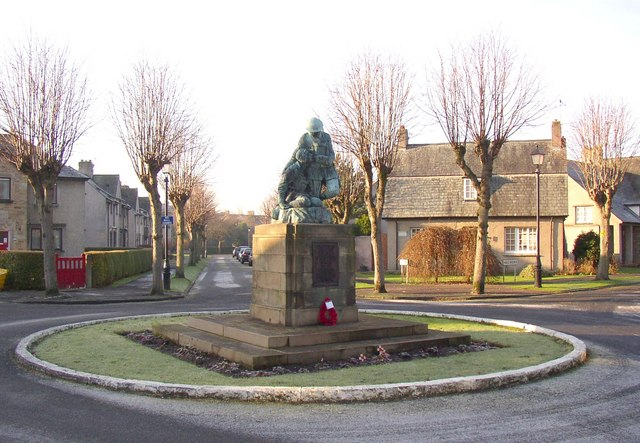
War Memorial, Westfield Memorial Village, Lancaster

Delahunt was born, and raised, in Hanley in Staffordshire, one of six children to Jane and Charles Delahunt, who worked for the Inland Revenue. She attended Manchester School of Art where she won several scholarships and both gold and silver medals in national art school competitions. Delahunt had a career as an art teacher, first as the modelling mistress at the Lancaster School of Art and then as an art teacher at the Lancaster Grmmer School for Girls. While teaching she continued to create sculptural pieces, often working in bronze to produce busts, statuettes and memorial plaques. Her best known work is the war memorial at the centre of the Westfield War Memorial Village in Lancaster which was unveiled in August 1926. The memorial, now listed Grade II*, is a bronze statue on a limestone pedestal, depicting one soldier supporting a wounded comrade and offering him a drink.

Delahunt exhibited works at the Royal Academy in London between 1908 and 1919 and also showed works at Liverpool and Manchester, where she was elected an associate member of the Manchester Academy of Fine Arts.
