= Westfield War Memorial Village =

Coordinates: 54°02′55″N 2°48′44″W

Westfield War Memorial Village (established 1924) is a residence in the City of Lancaster, England. Initially created for ex-service men, women and families after World War I, it continues to provide accommodation for 189 residents.

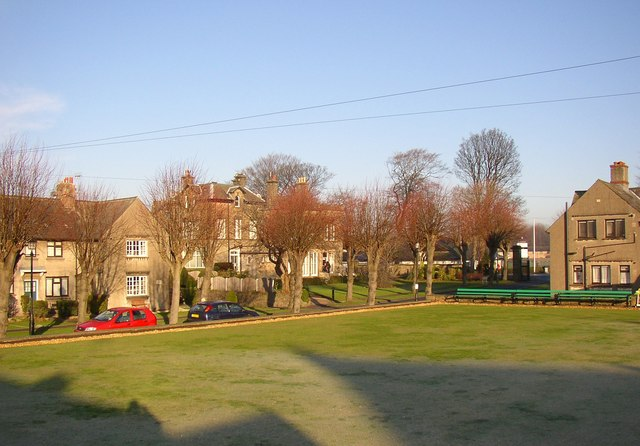
The bowling green, Westfield Memorial Village

== History ==
After the Great War, a national debate was ignited concerning how disabled servicemen from the Great War would support themselves and their families if they could not return to their former trade because of their disabilities. Local newspapers also promoted the idea that 'the nation owes a debt it should be eager to discharge as far as that is possible'.

It was from a strong backing of public support, including financial help and assistance in erecting the Westfield village, that a Committee for the promotion of a memorial village upon the Westfield site was appointed at Lancaster Town Hall in 1918, using the ideas of Thomas Mawson. In 1919 the Westfield Committee obtained charity status for the project, and published a brochure advertising their intentions, appealing for funds and organising an inaugural ceremony. The brochure explained the benefits and aims of the Westfield scheme, which were to erect a memorial, build cottages for the married disabled ex-servicemen, found a hostel for the unmarried men, and provide workshops and social amenities. It also claimed the village would not just meet difficulties of 'social reconstruction – the problem of the hour' but also provide a model of town planning on a small scale for the imitation of other towns. The local connection of the village is reflected in the proposed allocation system – Disabled veterans of the Kings Own Royal Regiment would have first refusal, followed by those of Lancaster District, with all overtones of charity to be strictly avoided. Herbert Storey believed that this memorial village should stand as a tribute to the gallantry and devotion of the men of this regiment and of Lancaster men and women of other branches and services.

Within three weeks of the Armistice, 11 November 1918, Ashton Hall hosted a crowded meeting to decide how Lancaster should commemorate those who served in the Great War. Its concluding resolutions were that a permanent memorial should be established in Lancaster to those who had fallen. The Westfield War memorial village grand opening was 27 November 1924, with the war memorial statue being unveiled two years later; 4 August 1926. It commemorated all those who gave their lives or limbs for their country in the Great War, in particular the men of Lancaster, who served in the King's Own Royal Regiment (Lancaster). Thomas Mawson, a renowned Landscape Architect born in Scorton, near Lancaster, derived the idea of memorial villages to commemorate the fallen in war from an article he read by William Hill, and expanded on this basic principle to include not just housing for the disabled ex-servicemen returning from the war, but also to give them employment in specially built workshops. This was a key addition, due to it being likely in a number of cases that the injuries sustained from war would hinder the ex-servicemen returning to their old occupations, and in some cases make it impossible.

=== Criticisms of the idea ===
Two key criticisms had arisen from the idea of a village for returning servicemen. The first was that 'inevitably a time would come when there would be no disabled people to live in the village, which may then become derelict'. The other was that the disabled ex-servicemen would not want to be segregated, nor wish to be placed in surroundings which would remind them daily of the Great War. This criticism in particular was taken up by the Ministry of Pensions, who had been unenthusiastic about Mawson's idea from its beginning.

However, after overwhelming support and offers of assistance, the Westfield Committee was set up, and it soon became clear these two criticisms were not going to stand in the way of the erection of the village. This committee was made up of members such as the Mayor and Mayoress, councillors, Lords and Ladies, prominent local businessmen, members of the armed forces, clergymen and doctors. This strong committee guaranteed the success of the scheme in Lancaster because they were able and willing to give financial support to the scheme. The Westfield Committee was also able to gain the support of such women as Mrs Lyell who had the time to dedicate to fundraising for the village. Mrs Lyell organised fundraising events such as what became known as 'The Lyell Golden Ballot', that raised over £20,000 for the village, which funded the erection of 31 cottages, including Lyell Terrace.

The bodies that did prove hindrances to the Westfield Committee were the government, the Ministry of Labour and Trade Unions. The government's refusal of finance for the erection of the village, which was one of Thomas Mawson's 'must haves' was the main issue for the Westfield memorial village to go ahead. However, funding by donation proved to be enough to combat this problem. The Ministry of Labour began in the mid-1920s to restrict the output of the workshops to the promotion of building related skills, as opposed to making such things as watches, pipes and umbrellas which had been progressing steadily. Then, when hostility from local businesses and Trade Unions hit the workshops, they eventually had to be closed down. Local newspapers were constantly in support of the Westfield village; regularly publishing articles promoting the idea, such as one in the Lancashire Daily Post in November 1918 entitled "The Nation owes a debt it should be eager to discharge as far as that is possible".

=== World War II ===
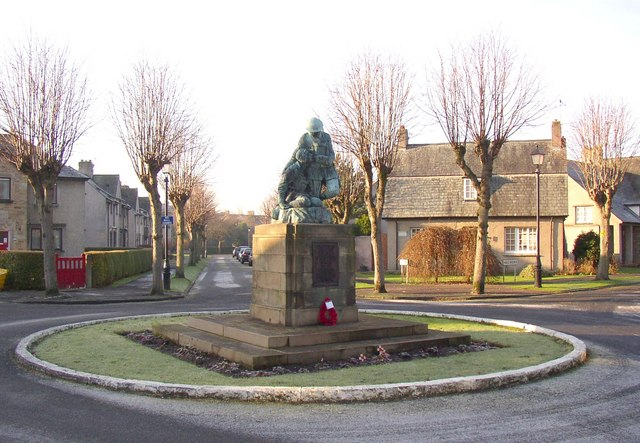
War memorial

The Second World War had an effect on the Westfield Village, as interest was once again renewed in it, and also a few extra tenants were placed on waiting list from that war.

== Statue memorial ==
The statue memorial in the centre of the village illustrates one soldier giving water to a wounded comrade, illustrating Lancaster's recognition of the efforts and sacrifices made by the men of Lancaster serving in the King's Own Royal Regiment. The sculpture is by the local artist and teacher Jennie Delahunt and was unveiled in 1926.

== Today ==
The Westfield war memorial village still exists today, with a waiting list of people wishing to move into the houses in the village; the war memorial statue still stands prominently in the centre of the village. Funding for the erection and maintenance of the village stems completely from donations made by the public. The village was leased in 1987 to a housing association for finance to modernise the houses. Priority is still given to those families of war victims.

Each house in the village has today a plaque outside the front door with information regarding a particular battle or an individual who fought in the war, or a group of fundraisers who paid for the house to be built; in particular the first house built bears the name of Herbert Storey, who gave the Westfield land so that the project could go ahead. The greenery that is present all throughout the village, including the trees which line the streets, each of the gardens owned by their respective houses, and the bowling green signifies healing and rehabilitation, to which it was hoped would aid the recovery of the ex-servicemen living there, as planned by Thomas Mawson. Finally, facilities such as the bowling green and the social club were established as a sign of the effort made to help reconstruct the lives of the ex-servicemen, and also as a gesture of thanks from the people of Lancaster.
