= Ferdinand Blundstone =

British sculptor

- Ferdinand Blundstone
- Born: Ferdinand Victor Blundstone; 1882; Switzerland
- Died: 1951 (aged 68–69)
- Education: South London Technical Art School, Royal Academy Schools
- Known for: Sculpture

Ferdinand Victor Blundstone (1882–1951) was a Swiss-born sculptor who worked in England. His father was Charles Blundstone, an India rubber merchant who was born in Manchester, England. He studied at the South London Technical Art School and Royal Academy Schools.

Blundstone's works include portraits and sculptures. After the Great War he executed several war memorials, including Folkestone War Memorial (now Grade II* listed).

== Education ==
Blundstone studied Art at Ashton-under-Lyne and then at South London Technical Art School before entering the Royal Academy Schools. There his awards included the Landseer Scholarship which he was awarded in 1904 for one of his sculptures. He won a second place prize for a model in 1905. Two years later he was awarded a one-year Landseer Scholarship. Also in 1907 he won a traveling studentship of £200 and a gold medal.

== Career ==
When Blundstone established himself as a sculptor, he had studios in London and in 1907 moved to Stamford Bridge Studios. Around 1907, he had a studio at Clifton Hill Studio. He lived in Manchester around 1908. He may have lived in Heaton Chapel (northern part of Stockport in Greater Manchester) with his family during World War I. In 1918 he moved to St. John's Wood. London was his home from around 1919 until his death in 1951.

== Works ==
The following is a partial list of Blundstone's works.

| Work | Image | Location | Notes and References |
|---|---|---|---|
| The age of imagination | | | This work dates to 1927. |
| Boy with fruit | | | Again dates to 1927. |
| Design for a Garden Figure | | | It is unknown when this design was created. |
| Figure of Diana | | | The bronze sculpture, now with a patina of "greenish/chocolate brown" depicts Diana with a fawn and a gazelle. The sculpture sits on a plinth of green marble. It is signed by Blundstone. |
| Folkestone War Memorial | | Folkestone, Kent | The Folkestone War stands in The Leas area of Folkestone in Kent and was unveiled on 1 December 1922 by the Earl of Radnor. A bronze figure representing "Motherhood" holds in one hand a pole with a flag at half mast and a cross. A victory laurel is raised in her other hand. She sits on a stone pedestal. The inscription reads: "TO OUR GLORIOUS DEAD / MAY THESE/DEEDS BE / HELD IN / REVERENCE" The Folkestone Harbour Station, the British end of the Boulogne-Folkestone crossing, was a main point of departure and return during World War I for millions of soldiers and nurses. |
| Gnome Monument, Bowring Park | | St John's, Newfoundland | Blundstone was responsible for the "Gnome" Monument on top of the Connaught Stone. |
| Jacob Wrestling with the Angel | | | The date of this work is unknown. |
| Memorial to Wilmcot Clifford Pilsbury | | | The date of this work is unknown. |
| The Newfoundland National War Memorial | | St John's Newfoundland | This huge memorial was unveiled on 1 July 1924 by Field Marshal Douglas Haig. A bronze figure stands on the top of the memorial representing "Freedom" and another four figures stand around this central figure. Blundstone was responsible for the bronze figures on the top and those on each side. Gilbert Bayes executed the bronzes at the front of the memorial. |
| The Plimsoll Line Memorial | | Victoria Embankment, London | This memorial stands at the Westminster end of the Victoria Embankment and Blundstone was commissioned to do the work by the National Union of Seamen. The memorial was unveiled on 21 August 1929 by Sir Walter Runciman. The "Order of Ceremonial" declared that the memorial was erected by the Members of the National Union of Seamen as a thanks offering to Samuel Plimsoll for his successful efforts in having the Plimsoll Load line, which prevented overloading of cargo, placed on all British ships. Plimsoll became known as "the Sailors' Friend". The piece includes "Justice" represented in the form of a woman and a seaman, both holding wreaths. (Note: The National Archives in London holds Ministry of Works papers which record the events surrounding the commissioning and erection of this memorial. See File WORK 20/187, which can be seen by appointment.) |
| The Prudential War Memorial | | Holborn, London | This memorial dates to 1922 and remembers the employees of Prudential Assurance who laid down their lives in the First World War. A second memorial just nearby remembers those who died in the 1939–1945 conflict. |
| Lewis Carroll majolica panels, St Mary's Hospital | | Paddington, London | Blundstone was responsible for majolica panels in the Lewis Carroll Memorial Ward at this hospital. |
| The Stalybridge War Memorial | | Stalybridge, Tameside | This memorial to the men of Stalybridge was unveiled on 6 November 1921 and Blundstone was responsible for the bronze groupings of dying soldiers and sailors being comforted by angels. |
| Tiger at Bay | | | This was made in collaboration with Herbert Thomas Dicksee in 1905. |
| Tyne Cot Memorial | | Tyne Cot Cemetery, Belgium | This huge First World War Cemetery was designed by Sir Herbert Baker. Tyne Cot is an enormous cemetery with 11,953 graves of which 8,366 contain the remains of soldiers who could not be identified. The Tyne Cot Memorial lists the 34,888 names which could not be fitted on the Menin Gate listings. These were men who went missing, were presumed dead and had no known grave. Within Tyne Cot are memorials to the New Zealanders who fell in the Battle of Broodseinde and the First Battle of Passchendaele in 1917 and another to the 2nd Australian Division. Blundstone and John Armitage were the sculptors of all the decoration involved with the memorial. |
| Titanic Engineers' Memorial, Southampton | | Andrew's Park, Southampton | Blundstone created a memorial of Aberdeen granite, funded by world-wide donations by merchant marine engineers, to the engineers of the Titanic who perished on its fateful night. Featured on the memorial is the figure of Glory, her hands reaching out with a laurel wreath to the struggling men below in the Titanic engine room. The 5.7-metre-tall (19 ft) and 10-metre-wide (33 ft) memorial, designed by Joseph Whitehead, is situated on a "gentle crescent" in a corner of Andrew's Park. It was unveiled on 22 April 1914. |
| Wendy statue (Peter Pan) | | Hāwera, New Zealand | This sculpture, one of his final works, was made for Hāwera's King Edward Park. It was completed with the assistance of Gilbert Bayes. |

== Professional associations ==
Blundstone was a member of the following associations:

- 1919–1951 – Member of Royal Society of British Sculptors
- 1921–1923 – Member of council Royal Society of British Sculptors
- 1924–1931 – Member of Art Workers' Guild
- 1926–1951 – Fellow of Royal Society of British Sculptors
- 1935–1936 – Member of council Royal Society of British Sculptors

== Exhibits and competitions ==
Blundstone exhibitions entries include portraits, statues, trophies and war memorials:

- 1903 – 'Tiger at Bay' shown at the Corporation of Manchester Art Gallery, Twenty-First Autumn Exhibition
- 1907 – Jacob Wrestling with the Angel was shown at Corporation of Manchester Art Gallery, Twenty-Fifth Autumn Exhibition
- 1907–1944 – at The Exhibition of the Royal Academy of Arts (Summer Exhibition)
- 1908 – Multiple works exhibited at Leeds City Art Gallery, The Spring Exhibition
- 1916 – Design for a Garden Figure shown at Arts and Crafts Exhibition Society: Eleventh Exhibition
- 1925 – For his garden sculpture, he won the Paris Exhibition's silver medal.
- 1927 – The age of imagination was shown at The Exhibition of the Royal Scottish Academy of Painting, Sculpture and Architecture, The One-Hundred-and-First

His competition attendance included:

- 1904 – Landseer Scholarships (Royal Academy of Arts) (Won)
- 1907 – Landseer Scholarships (Royal Academy of Arts) (Won)
- 1920 – Folkestone Memorial Competition (Folkestone Council), 1920 (Won)
- 1931–1932 – Memorial for Animals, for the Prevention of Cruelty to Animals (Royal Society of British Sculptors) (Participant, awarded £20)
