= New Romney Priory =

Former priory in New Romney, Kent, England

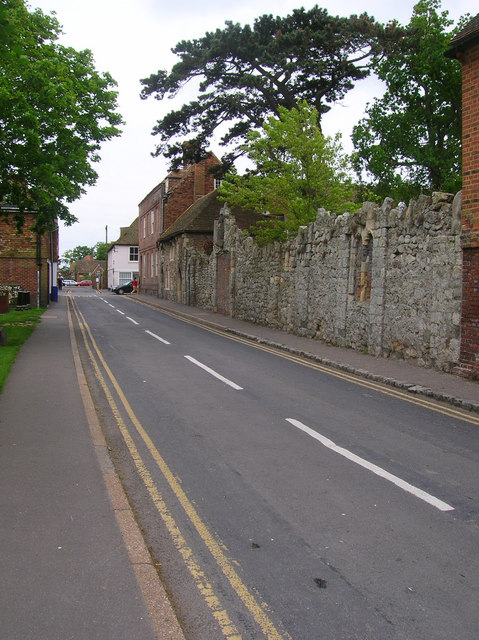
- Looking south along Ashford Road towards High Street, showing the building and wall of the priory

- Location within Kent
- 50°59′8.880″N 0°56′23.788″E
- Location: New Romney, Kent
- OS grid reference: TR 064 248

History
- Built: 13th century

Listed Building – Grade II*
- Designated: 28 August 1951
- Reference no.: 1025316

Scheduled monument
- Designated: 3 July 1995
- Reference no.: 1011803

New Romney Priory, or the Priory of St John the Baptist was a 13th-century monastic grange in New Romney, Kent, England. Remains of the priory survive in the town.

== History ==
Boniface, Archbishop of Canterbury, granted in 1264 the advowson of the Church of St Nicholas in New Romney to Pontigny Abbey in France, making Romney a cell of the abbey. It is thought that the "priory" was a monastic grange.

During the 14th and 15th centuries there were wars with France; the possessions of Pontigny Abbey were taken into the King's custody, and were finally confiscated about 1414. In 1439 Henry VI granted the priory to All Souls College, Oxford.

== Description ==
St John's Priory House, an 18th-century building on the corner of High Street and Ashford Road, together with a small two-storey medieval building on Ashford Road next to the house, and an adjoining wall along the road, are Grade II* listed. Remains of the priory west of the wall are a scheduled monument.

The small medieval building, of which the original purpose is unknown, is of stone rubble. It has two pointed doorways, one of which is bricked up; there are three windows each with two lights, with a corbel-head in the spandrel between the lights. The adjacent wall is thought to be reconstructed from medieval stones; it has various windows and a bricked-up archway. The remains of the priory in the large garden west of the wall include a wall and archway, of brick and medieval stone; further remains are preserved below ground.
