= John Thomas Parry =

British 19th century artist from North Wales

John Thomas Parry (Ap Idwal)
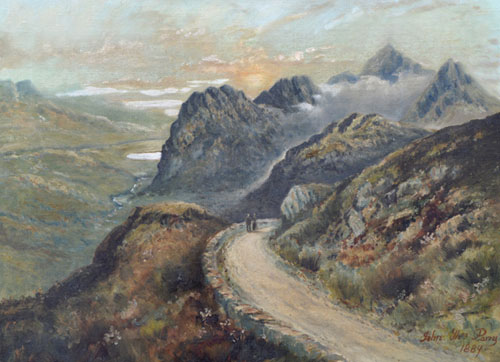
- A painting from 1889 of a couple on the hairpin bend at Pen y Pass.
- Born: 1853; Chwarel Goch, Bethesda
- Died: 1913 (aged 59–60); Bethesda

Signature
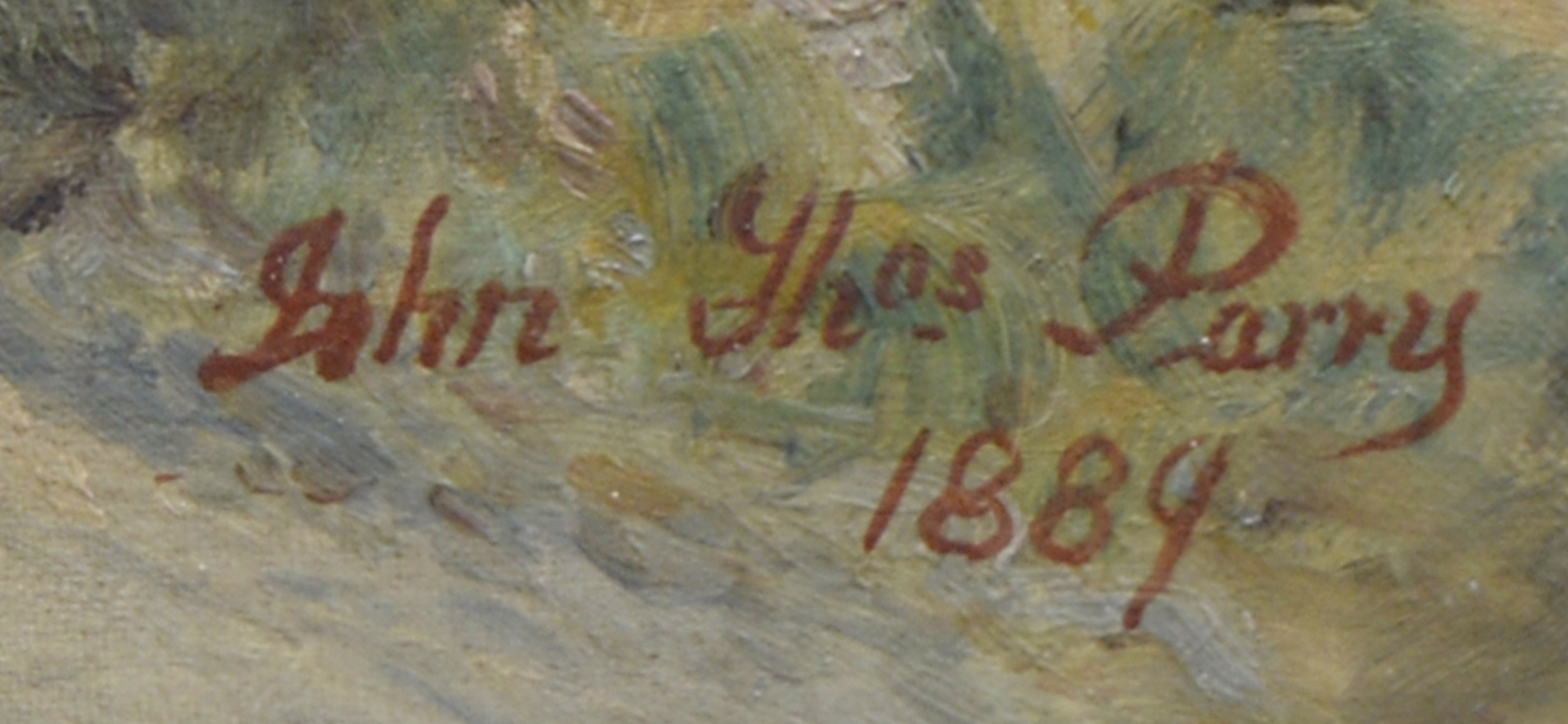

John Thomas Parry (28 June 1853 – 21 March 1913), also known by his bardic name Ap Idwal, was a self-taught Welsh artist and former quarry-man. He is celebrated for his landscape paintings of North Wales, particularly around Dyffryn Ogwen and its surrounding areas. Parry's works, created using a variety of materials, provide a historical record of the natural beauty of Wales during the late 19th and early 20th centuries.

== Early life and family ==
John Thomas Parry was born on 28 June 1853 in Chwarel Goch, Tregarth, near Bethesda, North Wales. He was one of seven children born to Henry Parry (1825–1894) and Ann Parry (1834–1893). On 9 September 1877, at the age of 24, he married Elizabeth, with whom he had ten children. The family resided at number 65 and later at 47 Ffordd Carneddi in Bethesda.

== Quarry work ==
Parry began his working life as a quarryman for the local quarries and Penrhyn Quarry, the major employers in the Bethesda area. Penrhyn Quarry, located near Bethesda in Gwynedd, was at the heart of the slate industry in North Wales, playing a key role in global slate production during the 19th and early 20th centuries. At its height, Penrhyn Quarry employed thousands of workers and produced a significant portion of the world's slate, especially roofing tiles.

Despite the physically demanding nature of quarry work, Parry dedicated his free time to painting, using slate pieces from the quarry as his canvas. He became known as the "quarryman painter" because he would sell slates that he painted with images of local scenery for a few shillings each.

== Connections to Penrhyn Castle ==
John Thomas Parry had an ongoing professional relationship with Penrhyn Castle as an artist, spanning from the age of 18 to 38. The castle holds examples of Parry's artwork dated 1871 and 1891. While boys as young as ten years old often worked at mines and quarries, it is not known how young Parry was when he started quarry work, but his talent for painting on slate came to the attention of his employers who were the aristocrats at Penrhyn Castle.

The specifics of Parry's association with Penrhyn Castle are largely anecdotal, passed down through oral traditions preserved over generations. Local accounts frequently describe Parry's ties to the castle with colorful details. One popular tale recounts how Lady Penrhyn was so impressed by Parry's talent that she offered to fund his professional training at an art school. Another story describes Parry riding a tricycle with "pockets full of gold" during his time at the castle. Additionally, a living relative claimed that Lord Penrhyn financed Parry's art training in Wales. However, these anecdotes remain unverified.

During Parry's lifetime, the Penrhyn estate was headed by George Sholto Douglas-Pennant (1836–1907), 2nd Baron Penrhyn of Llandegai. A former Conservative MP for Caernarvonshire, Douglas-Pennant was a polarizing figure, notorious for his disputes with trade unions at the Penrhyn slate quarry in Bethesda. He was married twice: first to Pamela Blanche Rushout in 1860 and later to Gertrude Jessy Glynne in 1875.

== Transition to art and working career ==
Over time, Parry's artistic talent gained recognition. By the 1881 census, at the age of 28, he was listed as an "Artist-Painter." By 1901, he described himself as an "Artist & Landscape Painter." Having left quarry work, he pursued art full-time, establishing a studio in Bethesda. Parry became a professional artist, supporting both himself and his family. Many of his paintings, which continue to appear in auction rooms and galleries, date from the 1880s up until his death in 1913. Some of his works depict scenes from earlier periods, such as his painting of Plasty Coetmor, a property that was demolished in 1870.

Parry was well-known and highly regarded in his local community. He frequently submitted his artwork to National Eisteddfod competitions and contributed to local projects, including painting scenery for several amateur dramatic companies and travelling theatre groups. This involvement introduced his work to a wider audience, earning praise from viewers across North Wales and as far as Liverpool.

== Ap Venus ==
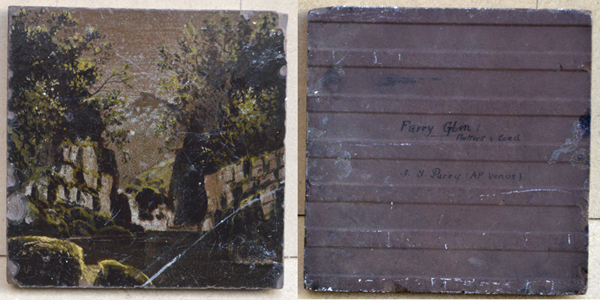
An image painted and glazed onto a fireplace tile depicting a scene from the Fairy Glen, Betws Y Coed.

J.T. Parry typically signed his paintings with his full name and, on occasion, appended them with (ap Idwal). In one notable instance, a Welsh newspaper article from 1887 describes how a stage production of Rhys Lewis had been received by an audience in Liverpool and it referred to Parry as "Ap Venus." The article also mentioned that a Liverpool newspaper praised the play's performance and scenic artwork. This remains one of the few known instance of "Ap Venus" appearing in print. Additionally, a decorative fireplace tile is inscribed "J.T. Parry (Ap Venus)," making this the only known occurrence of the name appearing on his work.

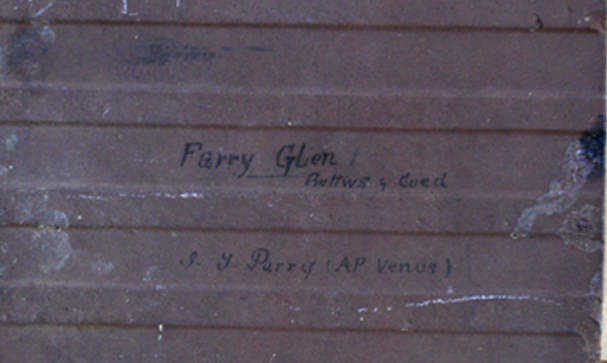
J.T Parry fireplace slate detail of reverse

Parry was known for his atmospheric night landscapes and theatrical backdrops featuring moonlit scenes and other celestial imagery. One painting was even described as being illuminated by the light of Jupiter. The reason for the "Ap Venus" name is unclear, but it happened during the period of his career when his scenic work was receiving wider public attention from English audiences.

The period between 1887 and 1888 appears to have been a high point in Parry's career, with several newspaper articles praising his scenic work and paintings. His name appeared frequently in local publications during this time, though later references, such as an 1891 competition win, were less detailed.

== Works held in collections ==
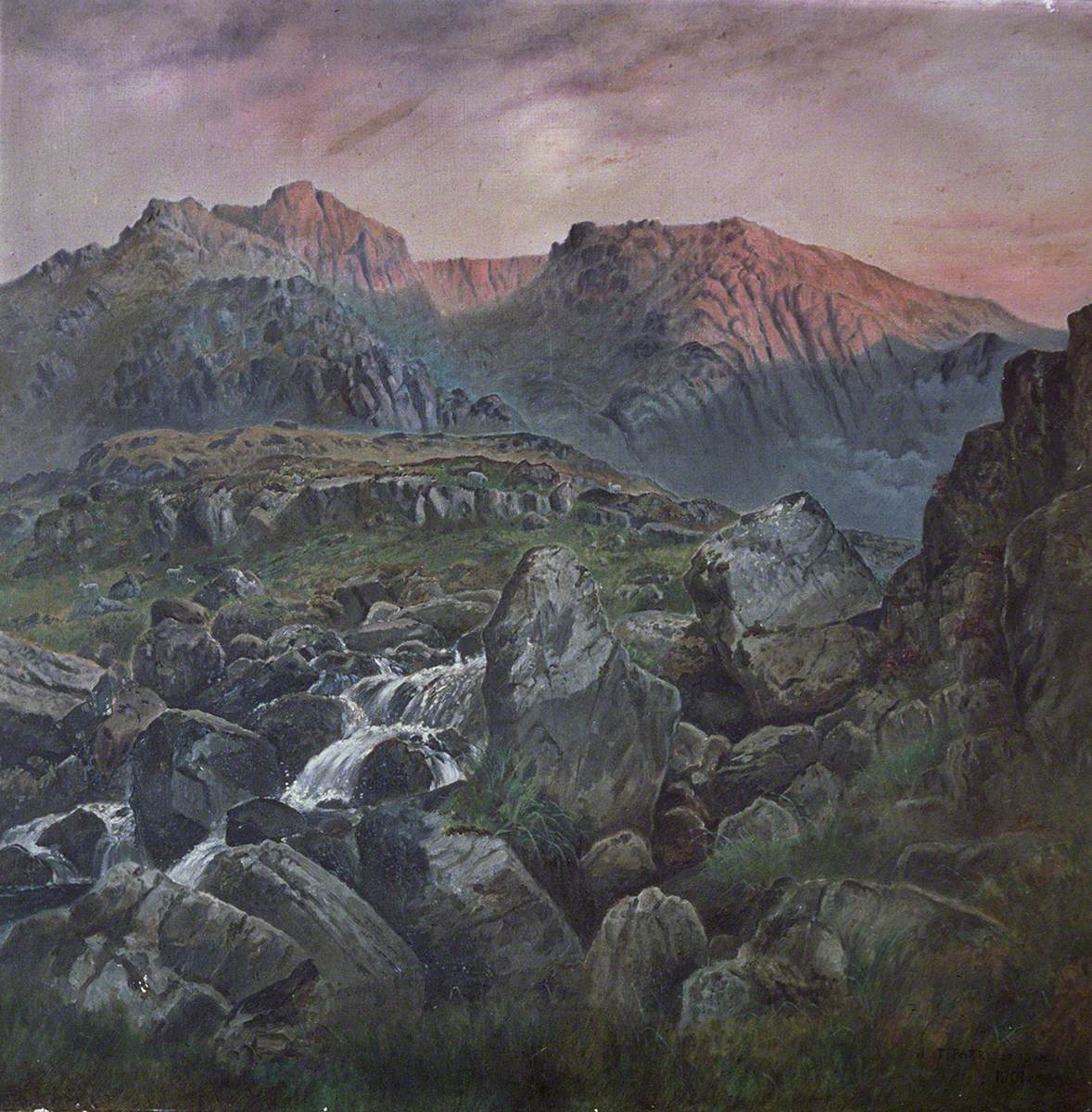
National Library of Wales: Cwm Idwal Sunset. J.T Parry

Parry's works are found in various places all over the world, from local stone cottages to aristocratic mansions, with two notable collections standing out. The first is an oil painting on canvas, Cwm Idwal Sunset (90.2 cm x 90.2 cm), painted in 1901 and currently housed at the National Library of Wales, Aberystwyth. It was purchased by the National Library in 1987 from a private collector. The second is a selection of watercolour images held at Penrhyn Castle, now managed by the National Trust. Among these is a painting of Talcen Mawr, a prominent quarry feature that was blasted away in 1895.

=== Exhibition at Storiel art Gallery ===
In 2021, Storiel, a museum and art gallery in Bangor, hosted an exhibition titled "JT Parry (Ap Idwal) (1853–1913): 'Quarryman Painter'". The exhibition aimed to highlight Parry's contributions to the artistic and cultural heritage of North Wales, focusing on his depictions of the region's landscapes and his unique journey from working as a quarryman to becoming a recognised artist. The exhibition was part of Storiel's broader mission to showcase the history and culture of Gwynedd, and it provided an opportunity to reassess Parry's legacy within the context of Welsh art history.

== Notable works ==
=== Pen Y Pass, Hairpin Bend, Snowdonia and Llyn Idwal, Snowdonia, North Wales (1889) ===
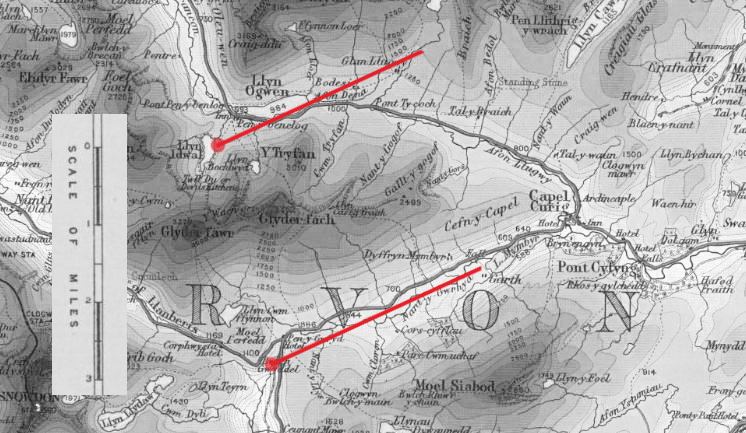
Pen Y Pass hairpin bend in relation to Llyn Idwal with viewing angle and distance.

Pen Y Pass Hairpin Bend and Llyn Idwal are two paintings created in 1889 by J.T Parry, depicting distinct locations within Snowdonia National Park, Wales. Both paintings are of identical size (61.5 cm x 46.0 cm) and are framed in the same style, intended as a pair. The artworks depict two well-known landscapes in Snowdonia: the Pen Y Pass hairpin bend near Llanberis and Llyn Idwal, a glacial lake beneath the Devil's Kitchen (Twll Du) in the Glyderau mountain range. The locations are connected by two main road routes: one via Capel Curig (9.8 miles) and another via Llanberis (22.3 miles). Despite the distance by road, the two sites are geographically close, separated by the Glyderau range. A direct walking route between them spans less than three miles on a map but requires a strenuous hike of approximately 5–6 miles (8–10 km) due to the rugged terrain. This pairing highlights the contrast between the two locations while emphasising their connection as different sides of the same mountain range.

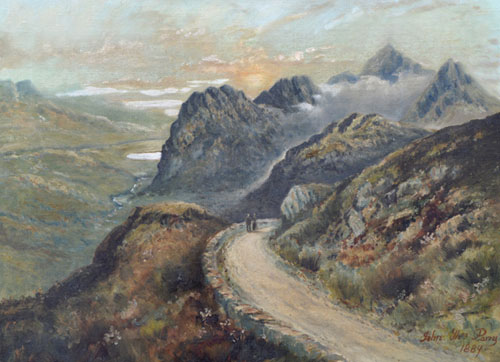
J.T.Parry Pen Y Pass J.T.Parry detail zoom of Pen Y Pass painting

=== Pen Y Pass, Hairpin Bend, Snowdonia ===
In Pen Y Pass, Hairpin Bend, Snowdonia, Parry presents an elevated viewpoint, which would have required the artist to position himself significantly above ground level at an implausible elevation. The painting deviates from strict topographical accuracy, with mountains appearing in improbable positions. This departure from realism contrasts with Parry's other works, which generally adhere more closely to the natural landscape. This painting incorporates artistic license, a common practice among 19th-century landscape painters of this period, particularly those influenced by Romanticism and Symbolism, they altered landscapes to convey deeper meanings or emotional impact rather than adhering strictly to realism. Some interpretations of this painting describe the landscape as having hidden figures such as an owl camouflaged within the hillside staring at the people, and a sleeping dragon curled up to form the mountain range, though these observations are not universally accepted and may be attributed to pareidolia. Hidden imagery has been a recurring topic in art history, often emerging from both intentional design and observer interpretation. A well-known example is Salem (1908) by English painter Sydney Curnow Vosper, in which some viewers perceive a devil's face in the folds of a cloak, an effect the artist denied as intentional.

=== Llyn Idwal, Snowdonia, North Wales ===
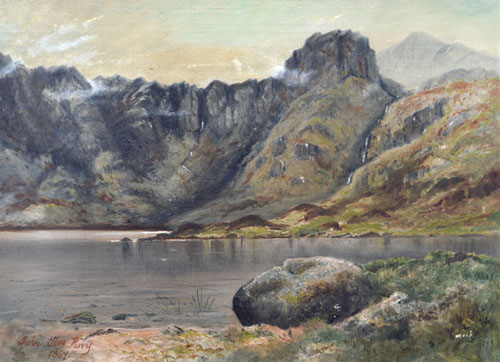
Llyn Idwal, Snowdonia, North Wales

Llyn Idwal captures the distinctive geological features of the area, including the cleft in the rocks known as Devil's Kitchen (Twll Du) and a large boulder in the water. Parry painted this scene multiple times, often from different perspectives, but this version is notable for its exaggerated landscape elements. For example, the rocky peak of Castell y Geifr appears significantly taller and more imposing than in reality. Historical etchings also suggest this area may have been taller in the past and newspaper reports from 1875 describe a storm that caused significant rockfalls and erosion in the area, altering the contour of the landscape. Compared to Parry's other depictions of Llyn Idwal, this version features a more dramatic composition, which some have noted aligns with local folklore and historical accounts of the region.

== Artistic style and theme ==
Parry's artwork primarily depicts rural landscapes, often set in North Wales and occasionally including well-known landmarks. His scenes typically focus on natural environments rather than urban or industrial settings. Many of his landscapes include one or two small, distant human figures placed in idyllic surroundings.

His approach varies depending on the medium. In his oil paintings, a limited range of colours appears repeatedly across different works, and simplified perspectives are commonly used. Some works incorporate romanticised or imaginative elements, though these are less common. In contrast, his watercolours tend to be more visually accurate, and often include combinations of browns and blues. Short, deliberate brushstrokes create a textured appearance in several of these works.

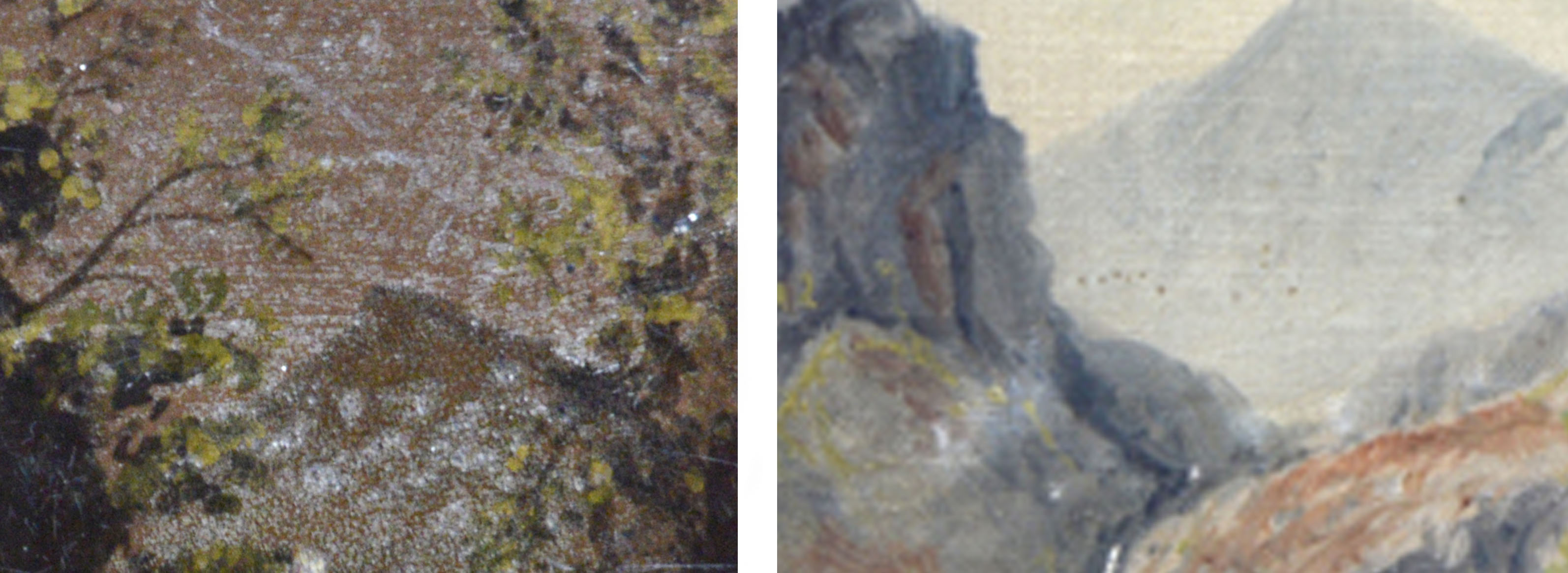
Detail sections from Fireplace Tile and Llyn Idwal

Many of his paintings also share compositional similarities, such as the inclusion of a distant mountain and small human figures. For example, a distant mountain appears in both Llyn Idwal and in the decorative fireplace tile attributed to him. In some cases, the mountains do not correspond to identifiable geographical features.

== Legacy and recognition ==
J.T. Parry's paintings hold significant historical and cultural value, capturing the landscapes of North Wales during a period of rapid industrialization. His works are preserved in esteemed collections, including Penrhyn Castle and the National Library of Wales, underscoring their importance in Welsh heritage.

During his lifetime, Parry was well known in Wales, but his work largely remained confined to North and Mid Wales. The revival of interest in Parry's life and work can be credited to researchers and artists, including Jeremy Yates president of the Royal Cambrian Academy of Art (RCA) and the late J. Elwyn Hughes, who played key roles in uncovering details of Parry's life and career. They also organized an exhibition of Parry's work at Storiel, Bangor's leading museum and gallery.

== Death and burial ==
John Thomas Parry died on 21 March 1913 at the Workhouse Hospital in Bangor, which now occupies the site of a supermarket on Caernarfon Road, Bangor. This hospital was replaced with the St Davids hospital in 1914 on the opposite side of the road. According to his death certificate, the cause of death was cerebral thrombosis. Family tradition, as recounted by Parry's great-granddaughter, who lives in New Zealand suggests that his death followed a fall while climbing Mount Snowdon, and he died shortly before his grand daughter was born, although this remains unverified.

Parry was buried in an unmarked grave at Coetmor Cemetery, Bethesda. No obituaries or death notices from that era in local newspapers have been found to commemorate his passing.
