= Cheriton, Kent =

Suburb of Folkestone in Kent, England

Coordinates: 51.088°N 1.142°E

Cheriton
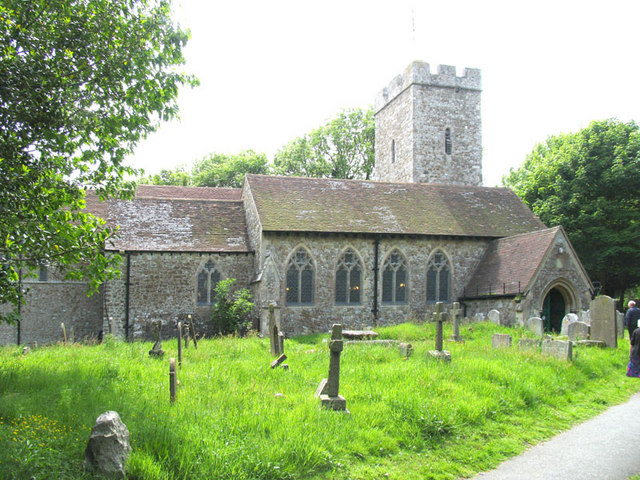
- St Martin's church

- Location within Kent
- OS grid reference: TR200368
- Civil parish: Folkestone
- District: Folkestone and Hythe
- Shire county: Kent
- Region: South East
- Country: England
- Sovereign state: United Kingdom
- Post town: FOLKESTONE
- Postcode district: CT19
- Dialling code: 01303
- Police: Kent
- Fire: Kent
- Ambulance: South East Coast
- UK Parliament: Folkestone and Hythe

Cheriton is a northern suburb of Folkestone, in the Folkestone and Hythe, in the county of Kent, England. It is the location of the English terminal of the Channel Tunnel as well as of the major army barracks of Shorncliffe Camp.

== History ==
The coastal plain where the North Downs meet the Strait of Dover has been of strategic importance since ancient times. Portus Lemanis was a major Roman harbour, overlooked by a fort near where Lympne Castle now stands. The Normans built Folkestone Castle on a spur of Cheriton Hill. The church of St Martin dates back to Saxon times and the name Cheriton means "Church Farm".

The British government purchased a large piece of land at Shorncliffe in 1794 and fortified it in preparation for the expected French invasion. Shorncliffe Redoubt is significant as the birthplace of modern infantry tactics. A Royal Commission was set up in 1859 during another invasion panic, which led to the construction of the Palmerston Forts and Shorncliffe Army Camp.

The Army presence led to a dramatic growth of Cheriton in the second half of the 19th century. This led to the distinction being lost between Cheriton and Folkestone, whose expansion was funnelled westward by the escarpment of the Downs.

Construction of the Channel Tunnel began in 1988 and it opened in 1994. The passenger terminal is wedged between the Downs and the M20 motorway just west of Castle Hill, and freight trains are marshalled at Dollands Moor Freight Yard further west.

== Government ==
Cheriton was a civil parish in its own right, and part of Elham Rural District from 1894 to 1898, when it became a separate urban district. In 1931 the parish had a population of 8089. The parish and urban district were abolished on 1 April 1934 under a County Review Order, and divided between Folkestone and Hythe.

== Geography ==
Cheriton sits on a level shelf halfway up the escarpment of Folkestone Downs, between Cheriton Hill on the landward side and Sandgate Hill going down to the sea. The Folkestone Downs are the southern end of the North Downs, a low range of chalk hills running from London to the White Cliffs of Dover. The Seabrook Stream flows through the west of the district, cutting a scenic valley between Dibgate Camp and St Martin's Plain.

== Demography ==
The population in 1851 was 1,658, which by 1861 had grown to 7,434 – of whom 4,204 were military in Shorncliffe Camp. As of 2011 the Royal Gurkha Rifles occupy Shorncliffe Camp so Nepali people make up a large part of the population.

== Economy ==
The local economy is dominated by the barracks and Channel Tunnel terminal.

== Culture and community ==
The Folkestone & Hythe Operatic & Dramatic Society bought the garrison church in 2001 and converted it into the Tower Theatre. There is a branch library in the High Street.

== Landmarks ==
The Folkestone White Horse overlooks Cheriton from the Downs north of the Channel Tunnel terminal. The earthworks of Folkestone Castle are just to the east.

== Transport ==
Cheriton Halt railway station on the South Eastern Main Line served the village between 1908 and 1947. It was just east of the bridge on Risborough Lane. The Elham Valley Way is a long-distance path that runs between Cheriton and Sandgate on its way up to Canterbury.

Stagecoach in East Kent operates local bus services to Canterbury every hour or to the town centre of Folkestone up to every 8 minutes.

Cheriton is the location of the Eurotunnel Folkestone Terminal, which connects through the Channel Tunnel to the Eurotunnel Calais Terminal located at Coquelles, near Calais.

== Education ==
Pent Valley Technology College was one of the main secondary schools in Folkestone and Hythe. The school closed in 2017, however Turner Free School opened in 2018 and occupies the same site as the previous school.

== Religious sites ==
There were four churches in the Benefice of Cheriton, which comes under the Deanery of Elham. The church of St Martin is very ancient, the base of the thirteenth-century tower may have been a Saxon porch. The decorative arcading in the chancel is made of Bethersden marble and is very finely carved. The churchyard contains the grave of shipping reformer Samuel Plimsoll (whose gravestone bears the Plimsoll line), and, among many military burials, 24 CWGC-registered war graves, with all three armed forces represented, 15 from World War I (Major-General Hubert Hamilton being the first and highest-ranking of the latter) and nine from World War II. The church gives its name to the military training area of St Martin's Plain and now serves Shorncliffe Camp.

All Souls’ Church was built in response to the population growth of the late 19th century. The old parish was split along the railway embankment, with the parish of Cheriton Street being formed north of the line. A farmer's widow, Mrs Thompson, died in 1887 leaving a plot of land on the High Street and a bequest of £10,000 for the construction of a church. All Souls was designed by Ewan Christian and consecrated on 3 January 1895.

St. Nicholas is a small rural church in the outlying village of Newington. The barracks had the largest garrison church in Britain but in 2001 it was sold for conversion into a theatre (see above). The three active churches are served by Revd Hilary Jones, who lives in St Martin's Rectory, Horn Street.

Cheriton Baptist Church is just along the High Street from All Souls. St Joseph's Catholic Church is between the two, on Ashley Avenue.

== Sport ==
Cheriton Bowls Club has a 6-rink green on Weymouth Road. Kent County Cricket Club first played cricket against Sussex on Sandgate Plain in 1862, but the last match recorded there was in 1870. It was located to the east of the remains of the martello tower to the south of the A259 Sandgate Road.

== Notable people ==
Odo of Cheriton (c.1185 – 1246/47) was a preacher and fabulist who in 1233 inherited land in Cheriton, Rochester and elsewhere from his father, James William of Cheriton. Samuel Plimsoll, the man who gave his name to the Plimsoll line used to indicate the limit of a ship's load, is buried in St Martin's churchyard, as is judge and politician Sir James Knight-Bruce.

== See also ==
- Cheriton Road is a nearby football stadium that is the home ground of Folkestone Invicta
