= Cheriton Road =

Sports grounds in Folkestone, England

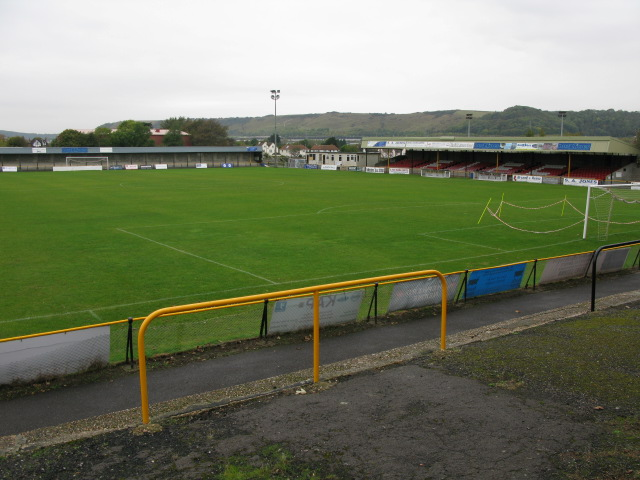
- The Cheriton Road football stadium in 2009
- Interactive map of Cheriton Road

Ground information
- Location: Folkestone, Kent
- Country: England
- Coordinates: 51.087°N 1.161°E
- Home club: Folkestone Cricket Club; Folkestone Optimists Hockey Club; Folkestone Invicta F.C.
- Establishment: 1901
- Owner: Folkestone and Hythe District Council
- Operator: Cheriton Road Sports Ground Trust
- End names
- North Downs End; Cheriton Road End

Team information
Folkestone Cricket Club	(1901–present)
Folkestone F.C.	(1914–1990)
Kent County Cricket Club	(1926–1995)
Folkestone Optimists Hockey Club	(1926–present)
Folkestone Invicta F.C.	(1991–present)
- As of 6 March 2018; Source: CricInfo

Cheriton Road is a complex of sports grounds at Folkestone in the English county of Kent. The complex includes football pitches, a cricket ground, hockey pitches, netball courts and an indoor sports facility. It includes the home ground of Folkestone Invicta F.C., known as The Alcaline Stadium for sponsorship reasons, and the Three Hills Sports Park which includes the home grounds of Folkestone Cricket Club and Folkestone Optimist Hockey Club. The cricket ground, which was previously called the Cheriton Road Sports Ground, was used by Kent County Cricket Club for top level cricket matches.

The ground is located around 1 mile (1.6 km) north-west of Folkestone town centre, 500 metres (1,600 ft) north-east of Folkestone West railway station. It was built on farmland owned by the Radnor Park estate between Cheriton and Folkestone. The A2034, the former route of the A20 trunk road, runs along the southern and western edges of the ground, joining the M20 motorway to the north of the ground. It is at the foot of the North Downs which rise on the northern edge of the Folkestone urban area.

== Football stadium ==
The football stadium on the site is the home ground of Folkestone Invicta F.C. who play in the National League South. It has a capacity of 4,000, of which 336 is seated. The main Wilf Armory stand, which seated 900, was damaged by storms in 2013/14 and demolished the following summer, with a reduced number of seats moved to the Brian Merryman Stand on the opposite team of the ground. Three terraces, one of which is covered, line the other sides of the ground.

The ground was previously the home ground of Folkestone F.C. who played in the Southern Football League. They had first used Cheriton Road in 1914. The club folded in 1991 and Folkestone Invicta moved into the ground, having previously played in Hythe.

The stadium is owned by Folkestone and Hythe District Council and leased by the club.

== Three Hills Sports Park ==
The sports park was fully opened in 2013 following a £6.8 million redevelopment of the cricket and hockey facilities at the ground which began in 2010. The redevelopment was funded by a donation from the Roger De Haan Charitable Foundation on land owned by Folkestone and Hythe District Council. The centre includes centre of excellence facilities for cricket, hockey and netball. The existing cricket and hockey pavilion was replaced by a modern pavilion and sports hall. The original had been built in 1905, funded by a £1,000 donation by the 6th Earl of Radnor.

Facilities include two artificial pitches, one of which is of a standard suitable for international hockey, a 3G football pitch, netball courts, cricket nets and an indoor sports hall. The complex is also the home of Folkestone Town Netball Club and Folkestone Running Club.

The complex has been leased by the council, who own the land, for 125 years to an independent charitable trust which manages the site.

== Cricket history ==
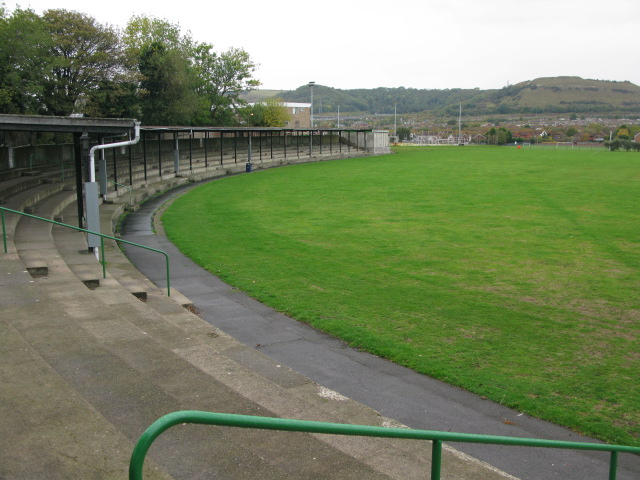
Covered terraced seating at the cricket ground, pictured in 2009

Cricket was first played at Cheriton Road in 1901, Folkestone Cricket Club moving from its previous ground, Sandgate Plain on the Folkestone Leas. The ground, which was originally on the site of the football stadium, was levelled and relaid before being first used by a Kent Club and Ground team in 1905. The ground was moved to its current site immediately to the east of the football stadium in 1925 and a cricket week was established during September of the same year with the first first-class matches on the ground being a Gentlemen v Players fixture and a match between AER Gilligan's XI and LH Tennyson's XI. During the week the ground was described:

It is a magnificent ground ... (which) rank(s) with any in England. The view from the raised enclosure on the south team ... across the golf links to Caeser's Camp and the bold outline of the Downs is a glorious one and lends a great air of spaciousness to the ground, which is itself on the grand scale...

– The Times, 8 September 1925

A new pavilion was built and the following year saw an England XI play the touring Australians as well as the first match featuring a Kent County Cricket Club team – the county playing MCC on the ground. Regular first-class matches took place in each year until the Second World War, with matches between touring teams and England XIs being common and Kent using the ground in most seasons.

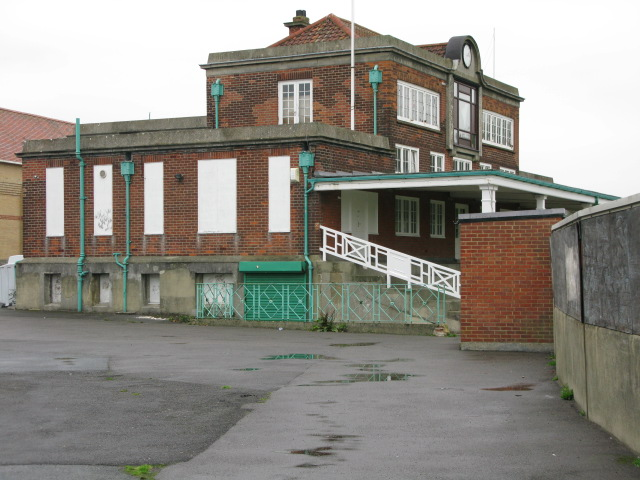
The cricket pavilion at the ground in 2009. The pavilion was replaced in 2013 by a modern building

After the war the ground was used regularly by Kent between 1949 and 1991, with a county cricket week being re-established in 1961. The county played a total of 85 first-class matches on the ground and, from 1969, played 23 limited overs matches on the ground. The final cricket week took place in 1991, with a final Kent First XI match taking place in 1995 against Cambridge University. The county has continued to the use the ground for Second XI matches, most recently Twenty20 competition matches. Kent Cricket Board used the ground for the last List A fixture on the ground in the 2002 Cheltenham & Gloucester Trophy.

The ground, which has been described as a "charming ground set beneath the Down", continues to be used by Folkestone Cricket Club in the Kent Cricket League.

=== Records on the ground ===
A total of 118 first-class matches have been held on the ground, 85 featuring Kent as the home team. Another 24 List A fixtures have been played, 23 featuring Kent as the home team and one the Kent Cricket Board.

==== First-class cricket ====
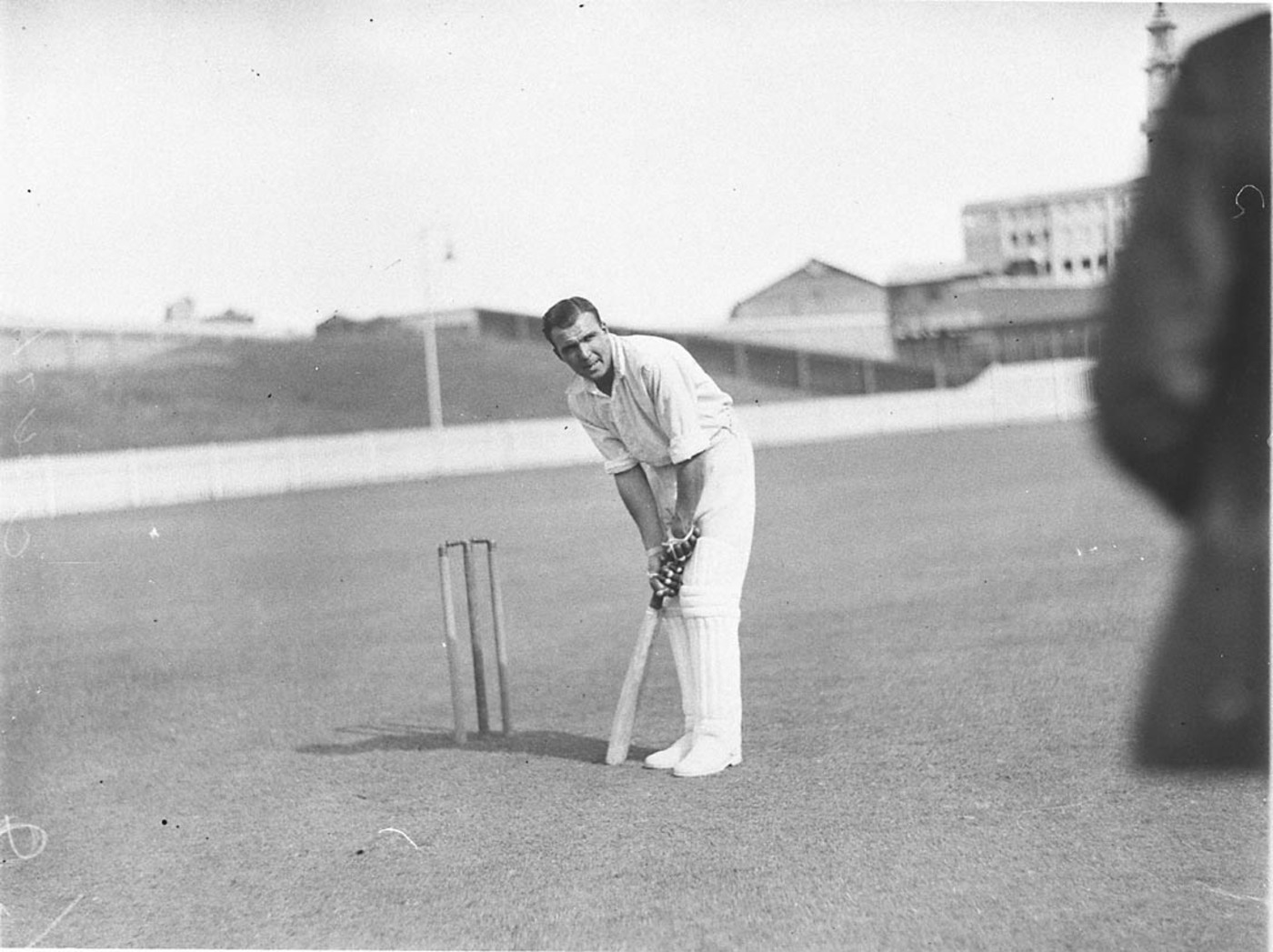
Les Ames, who made the highest individual first-class score on the ground in 1933

- Highest total: 592/5 declared by Kent against Gloucestershire, 1933
- Lowest total: 55 by MCC against South, 1933
- Highest partnership: 260, 4th wicket by CEB Rice and P Johnson, for Nottinghamshire against Kent, 1984
- Highest individual score: 295, LEG Ames for Kent against Gloucestershire, 1933
- Best bowling in an innings: 9/61, AP Freeman for Kent against Warwickshire, 1932
- Best bowling in a match: 17/92, AP Freeman for Kent against Warwickshire, 1932

The 295 runs scored by Les Ames in 1933 was the highest individual score by a Kent batsman in first-class cricket at the time. It was beaten the following year when Bill Ashdown scored 332 runs and, as of 2024, is the fifth highest individual score in Kent's first-class history. Ames made two double centuries on the ground in 1933, scoring 201 for the Players later in the year.

Fast bowler Fred Ridgway took four wickets in four balls on the ground for Kent against Derbyshire in 1951. Tich Freeman's figures of 17 wickets for 92 runs are, as of 2018, the third best bowling figures in a match for the county. They included a hat-trick.

==== List A cricket ====
- Highest total: 281/5 by Kent against Gloucestershire, 1983 (40 over match)
- Lowest total: 84 by Kent against Gloucestershire, 1969
- Highest partnership: 170, 3rd wicket by CJ Tavaré and DG Aslett, for Kent against Warwickshire, 1983
- Highest individual score: 122 not out, CJ Taveré for Kent against Warwickshire, 1983
- Best bowling: 5/19, JA Jameson for Warwickshire against Kent, 1974

== Hockey history ==
Folkestone Optimists Hockey Club use the complex as their home ground. The club was established in 1926 and organises the International Easter Hockey Festival at the ground. This is the oldest hockey festival of its kind in the UK and is over 100 years old and has included international matches in its programme.

The ground has been used for top-class hockey and hosted the opening ceremony of the International Federation of Women's Hockey Associations tournament in 1953, described as "the greatest international tournament ever held". A total of 16 teams competed at Folkestone during the tournament. It has also been used for trial matches and North v South games.
