= Listed buildings in Hythe, Kent =

Historic structures in Kent, England

Hythe is a town and civil parish in the Folkestone and Hythe District of Kent, England. It contains one grade I, five II*, 120 grade II listed buildings that are recorded in the National Heritage List for England.

This list is based on the information retrieved online from Historic England.

== Key ==
| Grade | Criteria |
|---|---|
| I | Buildings that are of exceptional interest |
| II* | Particularly important buildings of more than special interest |
| II | Buildings that are of special interest |

== Listing ==
| Name | Grade | Location | Type | Completed (Note: The date given is the date used by Historic England as significant for the initial building or that of an important part in the structure's description.) | Date designated | Grid ref. (Note: The grid reference is based on the British national grid reference system, sometimes known as OSGB36, used by the Ordnance Survey.) Geo-coordinates | Notes | Entry number (Note: The "List Entry Number" is a unique number assigned to each listed building and scheduled monument by Historic England.) | Image | Wikidata |
|---|---|---|---|---|---|---|---|---|---|---|
| Garden Wall on North and West Sides of No 32 | II | Bartholomew Street | | | 21 December 1973 | TR1598534801; 51°04′19″N 1°04′54″E | | 1069009 | Upload Photo | Q26321698 |
| Garden Wall to North, South, East And West Of No 38 | II | Bartholomew Street | | | 21 December 1973 | TR1583334800; 51°04′19″N 1°04′46″E | | 1344110 | Upload Photo | Q26627860 |
| Garden Wall to South of No 36 | II | Bartholomew Street | | | 21 December 1973 | TR1588934793; 51°04′19″N 1°04′49″E | | 1068967 | Upload Photo | Q26321658 |
| Garden Walls on South and East Sides of No 34 (hill House) | II | Bartholomew Street | | | 21 December 1973 | TR1597934800; 51°04′19″N 1°04′54″E | | 1068966 | Upload Photo | Q26321657 |
| Oak Hall | II | Bartholomew Street | | | 21 December 1973 | TR1602334815; 51°04′19″N 1°04′56″E | | 1069008 | Upload Photo | Q26321697 |
| Wall Adjoining No 26 to the North West | II | Bartholomew Street | | | 21 December 1973 | TR1603734807; 51°04′19″N 1°04′57″E | | 1344090 | Upload Photo | Q26627840 |
| Centuries | II* | 1 and 2, Bartholomew Street | | | 3 January 1950 | TR1610934810; 51°04′19″N 1°05′00″E | | 1069006 | Upload Photo | Q5063074 |
| 5 and 7, Bartholomew Street | II | 5 and 7, Bartholomew Street | | | 21 December 1973 | TR1603434784; 51°04′18″N 1°04′56″E | | 1068969 | Upload Photo | Q26321660 |
| 8 and 8b, Bartholomew Street | II | 8 and 8b, Bartholomew Street | | | 21 December 1973 | TR1609234802; 51°04′19″N 1°04′59″E | | 1344089 | Upload Photo | Q26627839 |
| 22-26, Bartholomew Street | II | 22-26, Bartholomew Street | | | 21 December 1973 | TR1604334801; 51°04′19″N 1°04′57″E | | 1069007 | Upload Photo | Q26321696 |
| 46, Bartholomew Street | II | 46, Bartholomew Street | | | 21 December 1973 | TR1575534808; 51°04′19″N 1°04′42″E | | 1068968 | Upload Photo | Q26321659 |
| Scene Farmhouse | II | Blackhorse Hill | | | 3 January 1950 | TR1752335705; 51°04′46″N 1°06′15″E | | 1344071 | Upload Photo | Q26627821 |
| Wall Adjoining No 17 (overbury) to South East | II | Church Hill | | | 21 December 1973 | TR1609334853; 51°04′20″N 1°05′00″E | | 1068973 | Upload Photo | Q26321664 |
| Wall Adjoining Nos 5 to 9 (odd) on South East Side | II | Church Hill | | | 21 December 1973 | TR1610334837; 51°04′20″N 1°05′00″E | | 1068971 | Upload Photo | Q26321662 |
| Wall to Cantle Cottage on West Side | II | Church Hill | | | 21 December 1973 | TR1612634860; 51°04′20″N 1°05′01″E | | 1068975 | Upload Photo | Q26321666 |
| Walls to South, West And East Of Old Walls | II | Church Hill | | | 21 December 1973 | TR1621534897; 51°04′22″N 1°05′06″E | | 1185716 | Upload Photo | Q26481021 |
| 5-9, Church Hill | II | 5-9, Church Hill | | | 21 December 1973 | TR1610134825; 51°04′19″N 1°05′00″E | | 1344072 | Upload Photo | Q26627822 |
| Botfield Cottage | II | 13 and 15, Church Hill | | | 21 December 1973 | TR1609734840; 51°04′20″N 1°05′00″E | | 1068972 | Upload Photo | Q26321663 |
| Cantle Cottage and Wall Adjoining West and South Sides | II | 16, Church Hill | | | 21 December 1973 | TR1610734851; 51°04′20″N 1°05′00″E | | 1299551 | Upload Photo | Q26586945 |
| Overbury | II | 17, Church Hill | | | 21 December 1973 | TR1608034858; 51°04′20″N 1°04′59″E | | 1185696 | Upload Photo | Q26481004 |
| 21-27, Church Hill | II | 21-27, Church Hill | | | 21 December 1973 | TR1605434947; 51°04′23″N 1°04′58″E | | 1068974 | Upload Photo | Q26321665 |
| Red Lion Public House | II | Dymchurch Road | | | 21 December 1973 | TR1589034675; 51°04′15″N 1°04′49″E | | 1068976 | Upload Photo | Q26321667 |
| 7 and 7a, Dymchurch Road | II | 7 and 7a, Dymchurch Road | | | 21 December 1973 | TR1584234677; 51°04′15″N 1°04′46″E | | 1068977 | Upload Photo | Q26321668 |
| Dukes Head Inn | II | 9, Dymchurch Road | | | 3 January 1950 | TR1577634654; 51°04′14″N 1°04′43″E | | 1185735 | Upload Photo | Q26481032 |
| 15, Dymchurch Road | II | 15, Dymchurch Road | | | 21 December 1973 | TR1573334659; 51°04′15″N 1°04′41″E | | 1344073 | Upload Photo | Q26627823 |
| Portland House | II | 17, Dymchurch Road | | | 3 January 1950 | TR1572234656; 51°04′14″N 1°04′40″E | | 1185743 | Upload Photo | Q26481042 |
| 29 and 31, Dymchurch Road | II | 29 and 31, Dymchurch Road | | | 21 December 1973 | TR1568434656; 51°04′14″N 1°04′38″E | | 1068978 | Upload Photo | Q26321669 |
| The Hermitage | II | 33, Dymchurch Road | | | 21 December 1973 | TR1563234660; 51°04′15″N 1°04′36″E | | 1068979 | Upload Photo | Q26321670 |
| Wall Adjoining the Old Manor House to North | II | East And South, Hillside Street | | | 21 December 1973 | TR1617034851; 51°04′20″N 1°05′04″E | | 1068949 | Upload Photo | Q26321641 |
| Rear Portion of No 2 | II | High Street | | | 21 December 1973 | TR1593334704; 51°04′16″N 1°04′51″E | | 1068970 | Upload Photo | Q26321661 |
| The Oak Inn | II | High Street | | | 21 December 1973 | TR1595834727; 51°04′16″N 1°04′52″E | | 1185881 | Upload Photo | Q26481174 |
| The Town Hall | II* | High Street | | | 3 January 1950 | TR1618834781; 51°04′18″N 1°05′04″E | | 1068981 | Upload Photo | Q17546006 |
| 1, High Street | II | 1, High Street | | | 3 January 1950 | TR1591334744; 51°04′17″N 1°04′50″E | | 1185746 | Upload Photo | Q26481045 |
| 31 and 33, High Street | II | 31 and 33, High Street | | | 21 December 1973 | TR1603534759; 51°04′17″N 1°04′56″E | | 1344074 | Upload Photo | Q26627824 |
| 36, High Street | II | 36, High Street | | | 21 December 1973 | TR1599034730; 51°04′16″N 1°04′54″E | | 1068984 | Upload Photo | Q26321674 |
| 38, 38a and 40, High Street | II | 38, 38a and 40, High Street | | | 21 December 1973 | TR1600134733; 51°04′17″N 1°04′55″E | | 1185887 | Upload Photo | Q26481179 |
| 53 and 53a, High Street | II | 53 and 53a, High Street | | | 21 December 1973 | TR1608834769; 51°04′18″N 1°04′59″E | | 1185756 | Upload Photo | Q26481055 |
| The Swan Hotel | II | 59, High Street | | | 3 January 1950 | TR1611034773; 51°04′18″N 1°05′00″E | | 1068980 | Upload Photo | Q26321671 |
| Lloyds Bank | II | 62, High Street | | | 21 December 1973 | TR1606734738; 51°04′17″N 1°04′58″E | | 1344078 | Upload Photo | Q26627828 |
| 64, High Street | II | 64, High Street | | | 21 December 1973 | TR1608534745; 51°04′17″N 1°04′59″E | | 1068985 | Upload Photo | Q26321675 |
| 67 and 69, High Street | II | 67 and 69, High Street | | | 21 December 1973 | TR1615734776; 51°04′18″N 1°05′03″E | | 1344075 | Upload Photo | Q26627825 |
| The White Hart Inn | II | 71, High Street | | | 3 January 1950 | TR1617334780; 51°04′18″N 1°05′04″E | | 1185836 | Upload Photo | Q26481130 |
| National Westminster Bank | II | 73-79, High Street | | | 21 December 1973 | TR1620734788; 51°04′18″N 1°05′05″E | | 1068982 | Upload Photo | Q26321672 |
| 86, High Street | II | 86, High Street | | | 21 December 1973 | TR1617334757; 51°04′17″N 1°05′04″E | | 1186009 | Upload Photo | Q26481282 |
| 87, High Street | II | 87, High Street | | | 21 December 1973 | TR1624534791; 51°04′18″N 1°05′07″E | | 1185860 | Upload Photo | Q26481153 |
| 93 and 93a, High Street | II | 93 and 93a, High Street | | | 21 December 1973 | TR1626434792; 51°04′18″N 1°05′08″E | | 1344076 | Upload Photo | Q26627826 |
| 94-98, High Street | II | 94-98, High Street | | | 21 December 1973 | TR1621334768; 51°04′17″N 1°05′06″E | | 1068986 | Upload Photo | Q26321676 |
| 112 and 112a, High Street | II | 112 and 112a, High Street | | | 21 December 1973 | TR1626234774; 51°04′18″N 1°05′08″E | | 1186018 | Upload Photo | Q26481291 |
| 114, High Street | II | 114, High Street | | | 21 December 1973 | TR1627434776; 51°04′18″N 1°05′09″E | | 1344079 | Upload Photo | Q26627829 |
| 116-120, High Street | II | 116-120, High Street | | | 4 September 1972 | TR1628834779; 51°04′18″N 1°05′09″E | | 1068987 | Upload Photo | Q26321677 |
| The King's Head Inn | II | 117, High Street | | | 21 December 1973 | TR1636034829; 51°04′19″N 1°05′13″E | | 1299468 | Upload Photo | Q26586868 |
| 119-123, High Street | II | 119-123, High Street | | | 21 December 1973 | TR1637534836; 51°04′19″N 1°05′14″E | | 1068983 | Upload Photo | Q26321673 |
| 122, High Street | II | 122, High Street | | | 21 December 1973 | TR1629634779; 51°04′18″N 1°05′10″E | | 1344097 | Upload Photo | Q26627847 |
| 124, High Street | II | 124, High Street | | | 21 December 1973 | TR1630234781; 51°04′18″N 1°05′10″E | | 1068944 | Upload Photo | Q26321636 |
| 125, High Street | II | 125, High Street | | | 21 December 1973 | TR1638234840; 51°04′19″N 1°05′14″E | | 1344077 | Upload Photo | Q26627827 |
| 126 and 128, High Street | II | 126 and 128, High Street | | | 21 December 1973 | TR1630834783; 51°04′18″N 1°05′10″E | | 1344098 | Upload Photo | Q26627848 |
| 130, High Street | II | 130, High Street | | | 21 December 1973 | TR1631334785; 51°04′18″N 1°05′11″E | | 1068945 | Upload Photo | Q26321637 |
| St John's Hospital | II | 150, High Street | | | 3 January 1950 | TR1639834830; 51°04′19″N 1°05′15″E | | 1068946 | Upload Photo | Q26321638 |
| 152, 154, 154a and 156, High Street | II | 152, 154, 154a and 156, High Street | | | 3 January 1950 | TR1641134836; 51°04′19″N 1°05′16″E | | 1344099 | Upload Photo | Q26627849 |
| 160, 160a and 160b, High Street | II | 160, 160a and 160b, High Street, CT21 5JR | | | 21 December 1973 | TR1650434879; 51°04′21″N 1°05′21″E | | 1068947 | Upload Photo | Q26321639 |
| The Manor House | II | Hillside Street | | | 3 January 1950 | TR1615734848; 51°04′20″N 1°05′03″E | | 1068948 | Upload Photo | Q26321640 |
| Wall to North and East of Oak Lodge | II | Hillside Street | | | 21 December 1973 | TR1601634845; 51°04′20″N 1°04′56″E | | 1068951 | Upload Photo | Q26321643 |
| Wall to North and South West of Tynwald, North Of Clyme House, North And South Of Dunkery And North, South And West Of Gramary | II | Hillside Street | | | 21 December 1973 | TR1624034900; 51°04′22″N 1°05′07″E | | 1186116 | Upload Photo | Q26481389 |
| Wall to North and West of No 25 | II | Hillside Street | | | 21 December 1973 | TR1597034836; 51°04′20″N 1°04′53″E | | 1068952 | Upload Photo | Q26321644 |
| Wall to North and West of Nos 7 to 15 (odd) Hillside Court | II | Hillside Street | | | 21 December 1973 | TR1602534830; 51°04′20″N 1°04′56″E | | 1299381 | Upload Photo | Q26586789 |
| Wall to North and West Sides of the Dene | II | Hillside Street | | | 21 December 1973 | TR1618234841; 51°04′20″N 1°05′04″E | | 1344100 | Upload Photo | Q26627850 |
| Walls on South and East Sides of No 3 Church Road | II | Hillside Street | | | 21 December 1973 | TR1620534870; 51°04′21″N 1°05′05″E | | 1068953 | Upload Photo | Q26321645 |
| Walls to North, South, East And West Of Vicarage And Adjoining Property To The West | II | Hillside Street | | | 21 December 1973 | TR1613634877; 51°04′21″N 1°05′02″E | | 1068954 | Upload Photo | Q26321646 |
| Avenue Cottage and Wall Adjoining to the South | II | 4, Hillside Street | | | 21 December 1973 | TR1615034880; 51°04′21″N 1°05′03″E | | 1186129 | Upload Photo | Q26481402 |
| 5 and 5a, Hillside Street | II | 5 and 5a, Hillside Street | | | 3 January 1950 | TR1613634846; 51°04′20″N 1°05′02″E | | 1344101 | Upload Photo | Q26627851 |
| 9 and 11, Hillside Street | II | 9 and 11, Hillside Street | | | 21 December 1973 | TR1606534850; 51°04′20″N 1°04′58″E | | 1068950 | Upload Photo | Q26321642 |
| 10, Hillside Street | II | 10, Hillside Street | | | 21 December 1973 | TR1596534861; 51°04′21″N 1°04′53″E | | 1068955 | Upload Photo | Q26321647 |
| 12 and 14, Hillside Street | II | 12 and 14, Hillside Street | | | 21 December 1973 | TR1595434864; 51°04′21″N 1°04′52″E | | 1299361 | Upload Photo | Q26586771 |
| Mill House | II | Horn Street | | | 21 December 1973 | TR1857535179; 51°04′27″N 1°07′08″E | | 1068956 | Upload Photo | Q26321648 |
| Building Adjoining No 4 on the North (western Part Only) | II | Marine Walk Street | | | 21 December 1973 | TR1618634723; 51°04′16″N 1°05′04″E | | 1344102 | Upload Photo | Q26627852 |
| Stables to Rear of No 86 High Street | II | Marine Walk Street | | | 21 December 1973 | TR1618034748; 51°04′17″N 1°05′04″E | | 1068957 | Upload Photo | Q26321649 |
| The Cottage | II | Marine Walk Street, CT21 5NW | | | 21 December 1973 | TR1618234735; 51°04′16″N 1°05′04″E | | 1186149 | Upload Photo | Q26481421 |
| 6, Marine Walk Street | II | 6, Marine Walk Street | | | 21 December 1973 | TR1620534713; 51°04′16″N 1°05′05″E | | 1186180 | Upload Photo | Q26481448 |
| 8, Marine Walk Street | II | 8, Marine Walk Street | | | 21 December 1973 | TR1620634706; 51°04′15″N 1°05′05″E | | 1068958 | Upload Photo | Q26321650 |
| The Water Mill | II | Mill Road | | | 3 January 1950 | TR1667234989; 51°04′24″N 1°05′30″E | | 1344103 | Upload Photo | Q26627853 |
| 7-13, Mill Road | II | 7-13, Mill Road | | | 21 December 1973 | TR1683034950; 51°04′22″N 1°05′38″E | | 1186202 | Upload Photo | Q26481468 |
| Military Terrace | II | 3-17, Military Road | | | 23 October 1974 | TR1571234750; 51°04′17″N 1°04′40″E | | 1068930 | Upload Photo | Q26321623 |
| 4, Mount Street | II | 4, Mount Street | | | 21 December 1973 | TR1613234734; 51°04′16″N 1°05′01″E | | 1186211 | Upload Photo | Q26481477 |
| 14-20, North Road | II | 14-20, North Road | | | 21 December 1973 | TR1651135054; 51°04′26″N 1°05′21″E | | 1068960 | Upload Photo | Q26321651 |
| 80, North Road | II | 80, North Road | | | 21 December 1973 | TR1605134979; 51°04′24″N 1°04′58″E | | 1344104 | Upload Photo | Q26627854 |
| 82, North Road | II | 82, North Road | | | 21 December 1973 | TR1604834973; 51°04′24″N 1°04′58″E | | 1299318 | Upload Photo | Q26586730 |
| Hythe Town Reservoir | II | North Road And Church Street | | | 13 May 1998 | TR1639335007; 51°04′25″N 1°05′15″E | | 1119742 | Upload Photo | Q26413037 |
| The Parish Church of St Leonard | I | Oak Walk | | | 3 January 1950 | TR1614934915; 51°04′22″N 1°05′03″E | | 1068961 | Upload Photo | Q17529941 |
| Wall to South of Parish Church of St Leonard | II | Oak Walk | | | 21 December 1973 | TR1611634896; 51°04′22″N 1°05′01″E | | 1299290 | Upload Photo | Q26586703 |
| The Whim | II | 36, Park Road | | | 12 June 2006 | TR1598134277; 51°04′02″N 1°04′53″E | | 1391472 | Upload Photo | Q26670834 |
| 13-17, Portland Road | II | 13-17, Portland Road | | | 21 December 1973 | TR1573634645; 51°04′14″N 1°04′41″E | | 1344105 | Upload Photo | Q26627855 |
| Grove House | II | Prospect Road | | | 21 December 1973 | TR1618734672; 51°04′14″N 1°05′04″E | | 1068962 | Upload Photo | Q26321653 |
| The Grove | II* | Prospect Road, CT21 5NL | | | 4 December 2015 | TR1622034636; 51°04′13″N 1°05′06″E | | 1430450 | Upload Photo | Q26263560 |
| 4, Prospect Road | II | 4, Prospect Road | | | 21 December 1973 | TR1623134719; 51°04′16″N 1°05′06″E | | 1116522 | Upload Photo | Q26410123 |
| 12, Prospect Road | II | 12, Prospect Road | | | 21 December 1973 | TR1637134739; 51°04′16″N 1°05′14″E | | 1344106 | Upload Photo | Q26627856 |
| Garden Walls to South of Corner House | II | Quorndon And West Bank, Bartholomew Street | | | 21 December 1973 | TR1591734789; 51°04′18″N 1°04′50″E | | 1344109 | Upload Photo | Q26627859 |
| Hythe Lifeboat Stations | II | Range Road | | | 13 October 2010 | TR1576633987; 51°03′53″N 1°04′41″E | | 1394324 | Upload Photo | Q26673413 |
| K6 Telephone Box | II | Red Lion Square | | | 7 February 2007 | TR1588434708; 51°04′16″N 1°04′49″E | | 1391856 | Upload Photo | Q26671198 |
| The Bell Inn | II | Seabrook Road | | | 21 December 1973 | TR1669434915; 51°04′21″N 1°05′31″E | | 1116490 | Upload Photo | Q26410093 |
| Pound Cottage | II | 47, Seabrook Road | | | 21 December 1973 | TR1703034862; 51°04′19″N 1°05′48″E | | 1344108 | Upload Photo | Q26627858 |
| The Black Cottage | II | 100, Seabrook Road | | | 9 October 2009 | TR1754534855; 51°04′18″N 1°06′14″E | | 1393476 | Upload Photo | Q26672634 |
| Hay House | II | Sir John Moore Avenue | | | 23 October 1974 | TR1568234841; 51°04′20″N 1°04′38″E | | 1068931 | Upload Photo | Q26321624 |
| Rockdean | II | 14, St Leonard's Road | | | 3 January 1950 | TR1587034429; 51°04′07″N 1°04′47″E | | 1344107 | Upload Photo | Q26627857 |
| Ruins of St Mary's Church | II | St Mary's Road, West Hythe | | | 3 January 1950 | TR1276134256; 51°04′05″N 1°02′07″E | | 1068965 | Upload Photo | Q17642740 |
| Church of St Michael and All Angels | II | Stade Street | | | 17 September 2010 | TR1603934577; 51°04′11″N 1°04′56″E | | 1393972 | Upload Photo | Q26673102 |
| 26-38, Stade Street | II | 26-38, Stade Street | | | 21 December 1973 | TR1604734515; 51°04′09″N 1°04′57″E | | 1068924 | Upload Photo | Q26321617 |
| Rose Cottage | II | 86, Stade Street | | | 21 December 1973 | TR1612834317; 51°04′03″N 1°05′00″E | | 1344128 | Upload Photo | Q26627878 |
| 102 and 104, Stade Street | II | 102 and 104, Stade Street | | | 21 December 1973 | TR1617134257; 51°04′01″N 1°05′02″E | | 1068925 | Upload Photo | Q26321618 |
| 110 and 112, Stade Street | II | 110 and 112, Stade Street | | | 21 December 1973 | TR1618034244; 51°04′00″N 1°05′03″E | | 1344129 | Upload Photo | Q26627879 |
| 114, Stade Street | II | 114, Stade Street | | | 21 December 1973 | TR1618434234; 51°04′00″N 1°05′03″E | | 1068926 | Upload Photo | Q26321619 |
| Piers Cottage | II | 10, Sun Lane | | | 21 December 1973 | TR1638034751; 51°04′17″N 1°05′14″E | | 1068963 | Upload Photo | Q26321654 |
| Martello Tower (no 14) | II | The Ranges | | | 21 December 1973 | TR1550033837; 51°03′48″N 1°04′27″E | | 1319907 | Upload Photo | Q17663958 |
| Martello Tower (no 15) | II | The Ranges | | | 21 December 1973 | TR1521433694; 51°03′44″N 1°04′12″E | | 1068964 | Upload Photo | Q17663967 |
| Martello Tower (no 19) | II | The Ranges | | | 21 December 1973 | TR1391432912; 51°03′20″N 1°03′04″E | | 1116520 | Upload Photo | Q26410121 |
| 1-7, Theatre Street | II | 1-7, Theatre Street | | | 21 December 1973 | TR1632634777; 51°04′18″N 1°05′11″E | | 1068927 | Upload Photo | Q26321620 |
| 2 and 4, Theatre Street | II | 2 and 4, Theatre Street | | | 21 December 1973 | TR1631634778; 51°04′18″N 1°05′11″E | | 1068928 | Upload Photo | Q26321621 |
| 6-18, Theatre Street | II | 6-18, Theatre Street | | | 21 December 1973 | TR1632034757; 51°04′17″N 1°05′11″E | | 1068929 | Upload Photo | Q26321622 |
| 11 and 13, Theatre Street | II | 11 and 13, Theatre Street | | | 21 December 1973 | TR1633734755; 51°04′17″N 1°05′12″E | | 1344130 | Upload Photo | Q26627880 |
| Former Animal Pound at the Junction of Albert Rd | II | Windmill St And St Leonard's Rd, CT21 6BL | | | 24 February 2012 | TR1590234447; 51°04′07″N 1°04′49″E | | 1407761 | Upload Photo | Q26675956 |

== See also ==
- Grade I listed buildings in Kent
- Grade II* listed buildings in Kent

== Sources ==
- Newman, John (2013) [1969], Kent: North-East and East, The Buildings of England, New Haven and London: Yale University Press, ISBN 978-0-300-18506-5
