= Folkestone-Hythe Operatic & Dramatic Society =

Coordinates: 51°4′45″N 1°8′2″E

The Tower Theatre

Folkestone-Hythe Operatic & Dramatic Society (FHODS) is a charitable organization that holds performances and events at its theatre in Shorncliffe, the Tower Theatre. A theatre which has been developed by FHODS from what used to be a church, for all types of performances. The society includes a youth section who perform three shows a year and meet at the Tower Theatre.

== History ==
The Folkestone Dramatic & Music Club was formed in 1902, performing at the Woodward Institute. This was later changed to the Folkestone Operatic Society in 1913 performing at the Pleasure Gardens Theatre.

The society closed for the duration of World War I (1914–1918), then continued to present plays up until World War II (1939–1945) when it closed once more. In 1947 Hythe was added to the name and the society held productions at the Leas Pavilion Theatre, Folkestone Town Hall, and Chichester Hall in Sandgate.

In 1952 FHODS acquired its own premises and developed the 57-seat Ham Yard Theatre. In 1963 a small former church was acquired in Sandgate and developed into the Little Theatre, Sandgate, as the central FHODS location during the 1960s, 1970s, and 1980s. Having outgrown the site, FHODS sought larger premises. The Tower Theatre, purchased in 2001 when it ceased to be used as the Shorncliffe Garrison Church, seats 270 patrons.

== Youth Section ==
FHODS Youth Section caters for young people aged between 12 and 21 who are interested any aspects of theatre. They meet every Sunday at the Tower Theatre. They put on three shows a year:

- The Brigadier Thomas Competition - held in spring, "the Brig" consists of a collection of one act plays (usually four) written, directed and performed by Youth Section members based around a common theme. On the second and final night they are judged by three adult section adjudicators for prizes for "Best Play", "Best Stagecraft", "Best Actor", "Best Actress", "Most Promising Newcomer Actor" and "Most Promising Newcomer Actress".
- The Summer Show - held in late summer or early autumn, the Summer Show is the principal Youth Section production where they put on a full-length play acted and directed by Youth Section members. Past titles include "Charlie and the Chocolate Factory", "The Insect Play", "Carpe Jugulum", "Little Women" and "James and the Giant Peach".
- The Christmas Revue - a relaxed format including songs, sketches and monologues. The emphasis is on showcasting the talent of the Youth Section.
