= Ronald MacNab =

English cricketer

Personal information
- Full name: Maurice Ronald MacNab
- Born: 6 May 1902; Hythe, Kent, England
- Died: 12 April 1962 (aged 59); Marian-glas, Anglesey, Wales
- Batting: Left-handed
- Bowling: Left-arm (unknown style)

Domestic team information
- Years: Team
- 1934–1935: Denbighshire
- 1930: Wales

Career statistics
Competition	First-class
Matches	1
Runs scored	3
Batting average	1.50
100s/50s	–/–
Top score	2
Balls bowled	30
Wickets	1
Bowling average	16.00
5 wickets in innings	–
10 wickets in match	–
Best bowling	1/16
Catches/stumpings	–/–
- Source: Cricinfo, 24 August 2011

Maurice Ronald MacNab, born in Hythe, Kent on 6 May 1902 – 12 April 1962, was an English cricketer. MacNab was a left-handed batsman whose bowling style is unknown, but it is known he bowled with his left-arm.

MacNab made his only first-class appearance for Wales against the Marylebone Cricket Club in 1930. In this match, he took the wicket of Reginald Covill, while with the bat he scored a single run in the Welsh first-innings before being dismissed by Ewart Astill, while in their second-innings he was dismissed for 2 runs by Harold Pickthall. MacNab later made his debut for Denbighshire in the 1934 Minor Counties Championship against Durham. He made a further two Minor Counties Championship appearances for the county, both of which came against Northumberland in 1934 and 1935.

He died in Marian-glas, Anglesey on 12 April 1962.
