= St Martin's Plain =

Coordinates: 51°05′18″N 1°07′15″E

The area known as St Martin's Plain is located to the west of Cheriton, part of Folkestone, Kent, England. It is used by the British Army from Shorncliffe Army Camp for training; during wartime, and especially during World War I and World War II temporary camps were built here. It is also used by the Army Cadets on training weekends or camps.

The Elham Valley Way passes through the area. The plain is the closest rural area to Sandgate and Cheriton.
