= Folkestone Castle =

Coordinates: 51.09854°N 1.16078°E

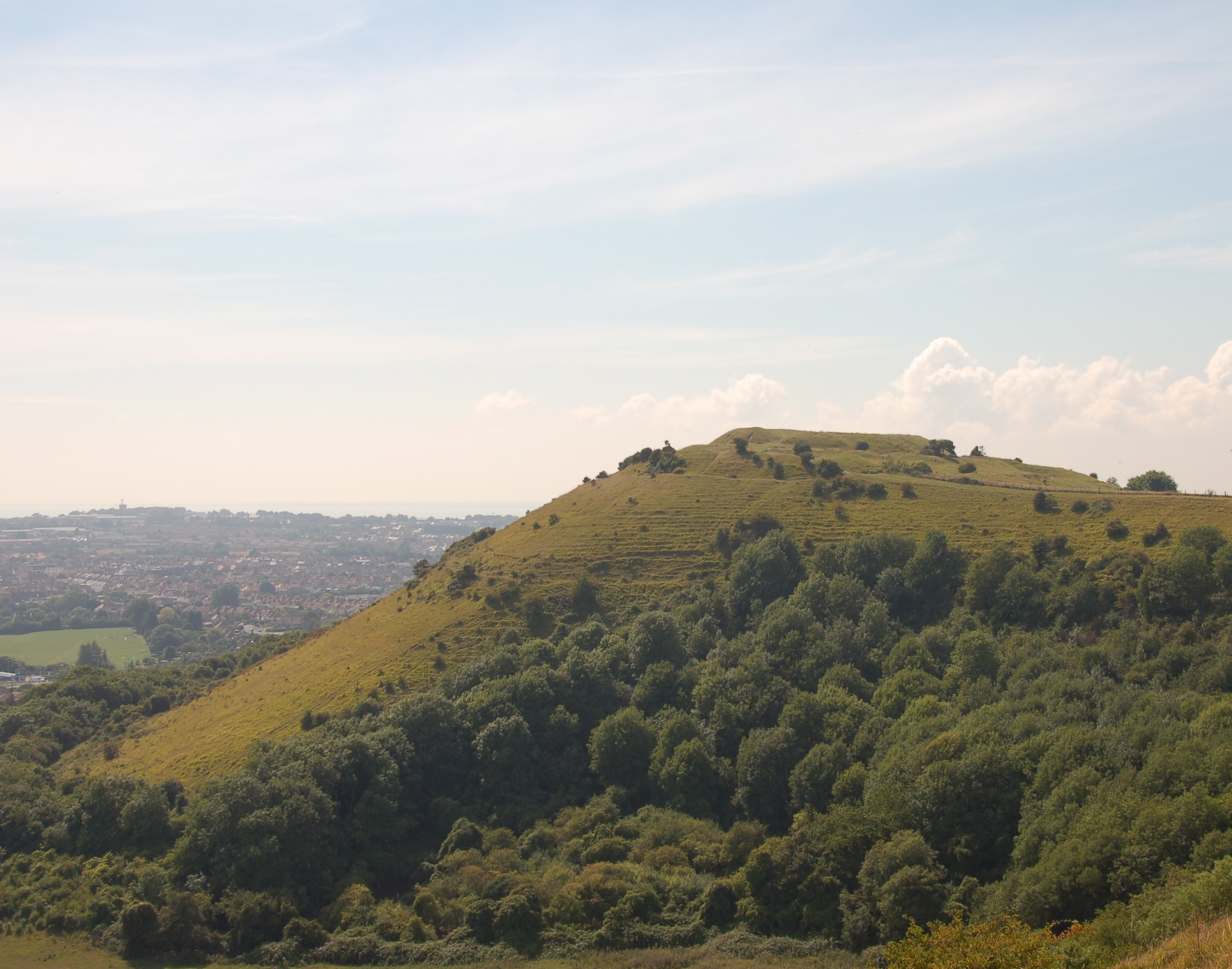
The earthworks of Folkestone Castle on the summit of Castle Hill.

Folkestone Castle stood on a spur of the North Downs to the north of the town of Folkestone, Kent (grid reference TR214380).

The Norman castle existed in the late 11th and 12th centuries and was built on a natural mound which. It was excavated in 1878 by Augustus Pitt Rivers and this has been claimed to be the first excavation of a medieval site in Britain using scientific methods.

Known locally as "Caesar's Camp", it is not actually Roman at all, but was probably constructed as early as 1095 and was certainly occupied for some time following the Norman invasion. The hill on which it stands is known as Castle Hill and it affords splendid views over the town and coast, from Folkestone across Romney Marsh to Dungeness, Rye and Fairlight.

The earthworks now overlook the end of the M20 motorway and the entrance to the Channel Tunnel at Cheriton.
