= Sandgate Plain =

Cricket ground in Folkestone, Kent, England

- Interactive map of Sandgate Plain

Ground information
- Location: Folkestone, Kent
- Country: England
- Coordinates: 51.076°N 1.156°E
- Establishment: 1859
- Last used: 1901

Team information
Folkestone Cricket Club	(1859–1901)
Kent County Cricket Club	(1862–1863)
- As of 8 December 2017; Source: CricketArchive

Sandgate Plain was a cricket ground in Folkestone in Kent. The ground was situated on the Folkestone Leas, an area along the coast to the west of the town centre close to the village of Sandgate. The ground was one of two located either team of the Upper Folkestone Road, now the A259 Sandgate Road, which were established by 1859. The ground was used by Folkestone Cricket Club between 1859 and 1901.

The ground was the venue for two first-class cricket matches in the 1860s. Kent County Cricket Club played Sussex County Cricket Club in both matches, one in 1862 and one in 1863. The first match generated much interest and special trains were laid on to bring spectators to the town.

Folkestone played one match on the ground against the New All England Eleven, a team of professional cricketers, in 1864 and the United South of England Eleven played challenge matches on the ground three times between 1865 and 1870. Folkestone Cricket Club moved to Cheriton Road at the beginning of the 20th century and the ground there was used by Kent for over 100 First XI matches between 1926 and 1995.

The area where the ground was located is now built-up with areas of housing. The remains of a martello tower at the top of Sandgate Hill mark the edge of the former ground.
