= Tower Theatre (Folkestone) =

Coordinates: 51°4′45″N 1°8′4″E

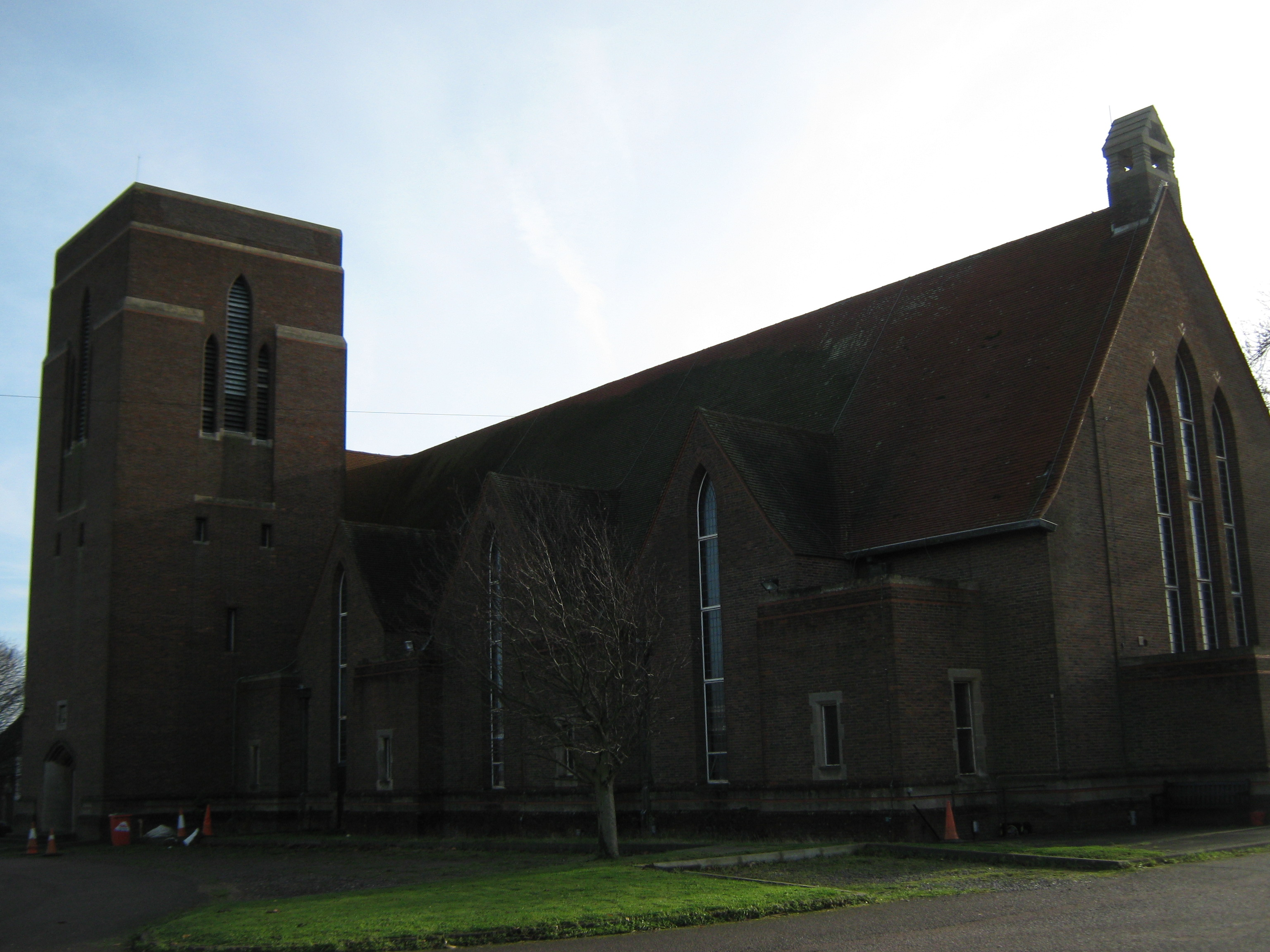
The Tower Theatre.

The Tower Theatre is a theatre in Folkestone, Kent that has been converted from the garrison church of Shorncliffe Camp barracks. The venue is owned by Folkestone-Hythe Operatic & Dramatic Society, (FHODS).

== Society ==
FHODS is a charitable organisation that has been running in Folkestone and Hythe since 1902. It is an operatic and dramatic society for amateurs. It regularly holds events and shows for the people of Folkestone and its surrounding areas. Very few similar societies in the UK own their own theatre, although this is the third successive theatre to be owned and operated by FHODS.

== Building ==
The garrison church was purchased by FHODS in 2001, and renamed The Tower Theatre. This is the largest garrison church in the UK. It was converted in late 2006 to early 2007 to a theatre. This new theatre has a 300-seat auditorium with a large stage.

== See also ==
- Folkestone-Hythe Operatic & Dramatic Society
