= Hythe, Kent =

Town in Kent, England

Coordinates: 51°04′18″N 1°05′02″E

Hythe
- Market town and civil parish
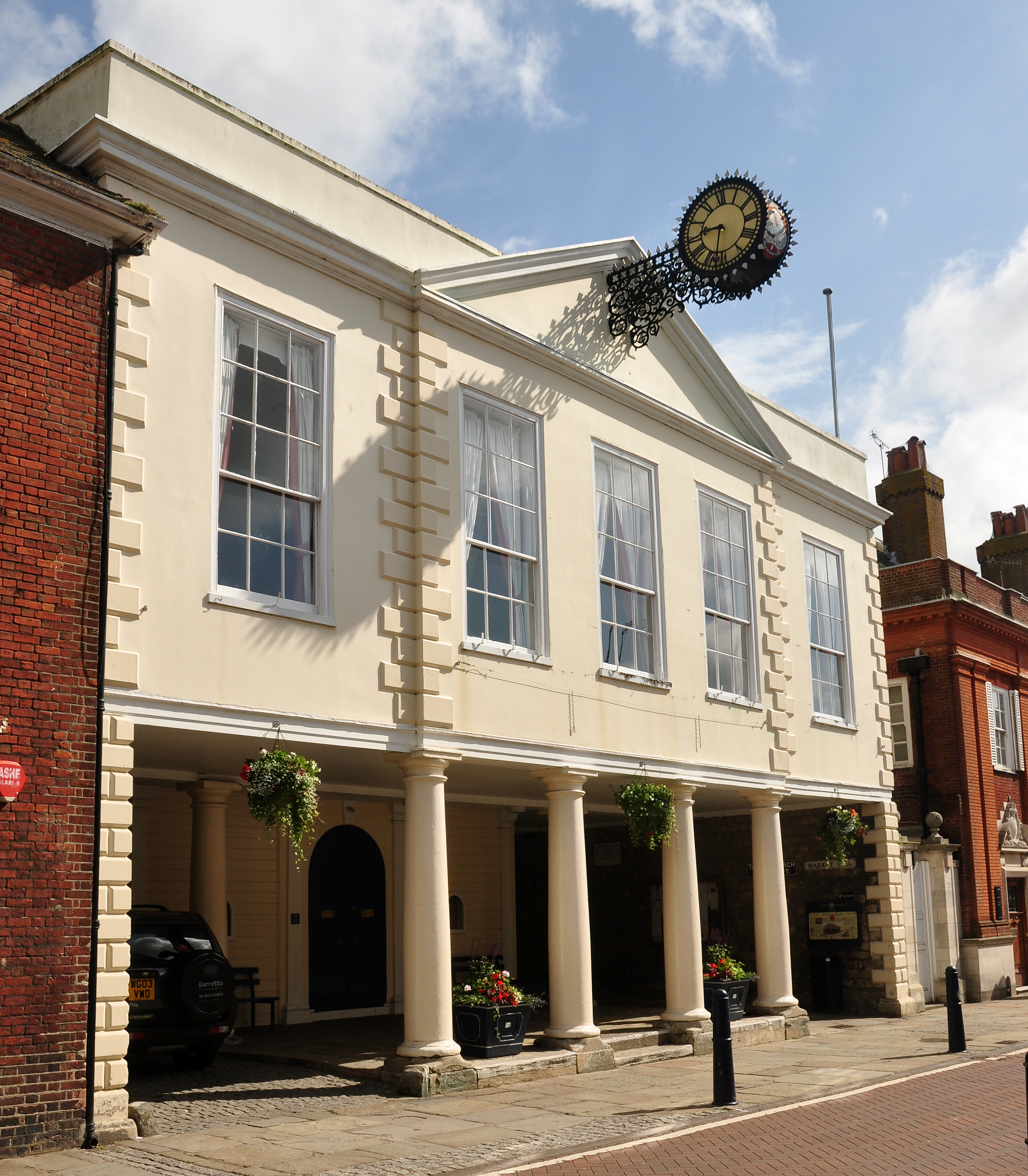
- Hythe Town Hall

- Location within Kent
- Population: 14,604 (2021)
- OS grid reference: TR158350
- Civil parish: Hythe
- District: Folkestone and Hythe
- Shire county: Kent
- Region: South East
- Country: England
- Sovereign state: United Kingdom
- Post town: HYTHE
- Postcode district: CT21
- Dialling code: 01303
- Police: Kent
- Fire: Kent
- Ambulance: South East Coast
- UK Parliament: Folkestone and Hythe

Hythe (/ˈhaɪð/) is an old market town and civil parish on the edge of Romney Marsh in Kent, England. Hythe is an Old English word meaning haven or landing place.

== History ==
The name Hythe derives from the Old English for 'landing place'.

The earliest reference to Hythe is in Domesday Book (1086) though there is evidence of the area having been settled since Roman times.

The town has mediaeval and Georgian buildings, as well as a Saxon/Norman church on the hill and a Victorian seafront promenade. Hythe was once defended by castles at Saltwood and Lympne. Hythe Town Hall, a neoclassical style building, was completed in 1794.

Hythe's market once took place in Market Square (now Red Lion Square) close to where there is now a farmers' market every second and fourth Saturday of the month. Hythe has gardening, horse riding, bowling, tennis, cricket, football, squash and sailing clubs. Lord Deedes was once patron of Hythe Civic Society.

As an important Cinque Port, Hythe once possessed a bustling harbour which, over the course of 300 years, has now disappeared due to silting. Hythe was the central Cinque Port, sitting between Hastings and New Romney to the west and Dover and Sandwich to the east.

According to Hasted, a French fleet approached Hythe in 1293 and landed 200 men, but "the townsmen came upon them and slew every one of them: upon which the rest of the fleet hoisted sail and made no further attempt".

In 1348, the Black Death afflicted Hythe, and in 1400 the plague further reduced the population.

Hythe has no coat of arms; however, the corporation seal represents an antique vessel with one mast, two men in it (one blowing a horn) and two men lying on the yard arm.

Hythe was the home of the Mackeson Brewery, which after changes of ownership, closed in 1968. It was the birthplace of Mackeson Stout, a type of beer first brewed in 1909, which went on to become a national brand. Mackeson stout is no longer brewed locally but is produced under contract by one of the major national brewers.

Hythe Ranges is a military training ground that takes up a large section of the Hythe shoreline. Access to this section of the shore is restricted when red flags are showing.

== Royal Military Canal and Martello Towers ==
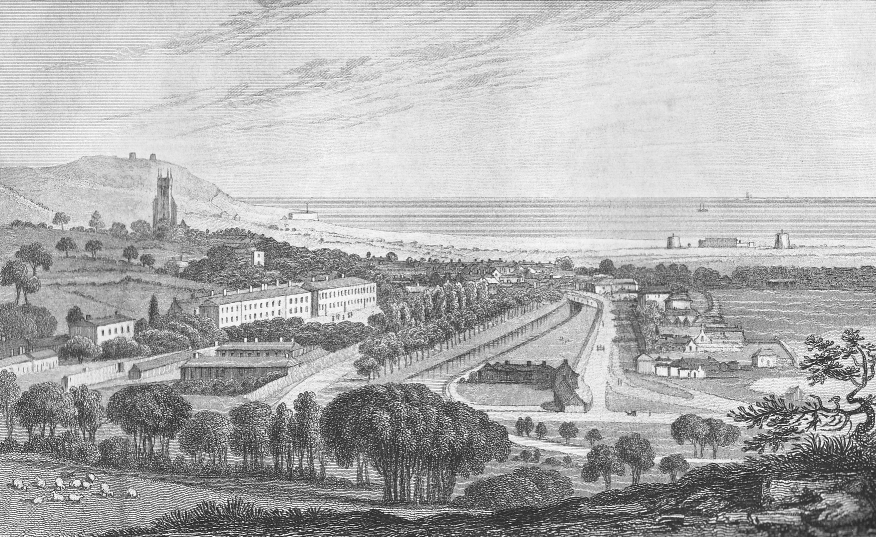
View of Hythe ca. 1830, showing the military canal and four Martello towers near the shoreline. Source: Ireland's History of Kent.

The Royal Military Canal runs across the northern edge of the marsh, to Winchelsea. Running under Stade Street, the canal, intended to repel invasion during the Napoleonic Wars of 1804 to 1815, gives central Hythe its character. Now shaded by trees, the canal, 10 yards wide, passes into the marsh from the middle of the town. The canal begins at Seabrook and runs through Hythe. It follows the original haven that was once Hythe's harbour as far as the light railway thence across Romney Marsh to Winchelsea. Its 26-mile length can be walked.

Also built around the same time as a defence against possible invasion by Napoleon were the Martello Towers. In total, 74 of these towers were built between Folkestone and Seaford. The walls were up to 13 ft (4 m) thick, and each tower held 24 men and had a huge cannon mounted on the top. They were named after a similar tower at Mortella Point in Corsica which the Navy had captured from the French. Although never needed for their original purpose they were later used to combat smuggling and also acted as signalling stations and coastal defences during the two world wars. Three of the towers survive at Hythe; one was converted to a house in the 1930s and can be seen along West Parade, and the other two are on the beach and are owned by the Ministry of Defence.

Geologically, the town developed on a succession of non-parallel terraces, rising from the level ground around the Royal Canal (previously named the Royal Military Canal) towards the steep incline upon which the parish church of St Leonard was built. From the High Street, alleys lead up to the steeper levels of the town.

== Castles at Saltwood and Lympne ==
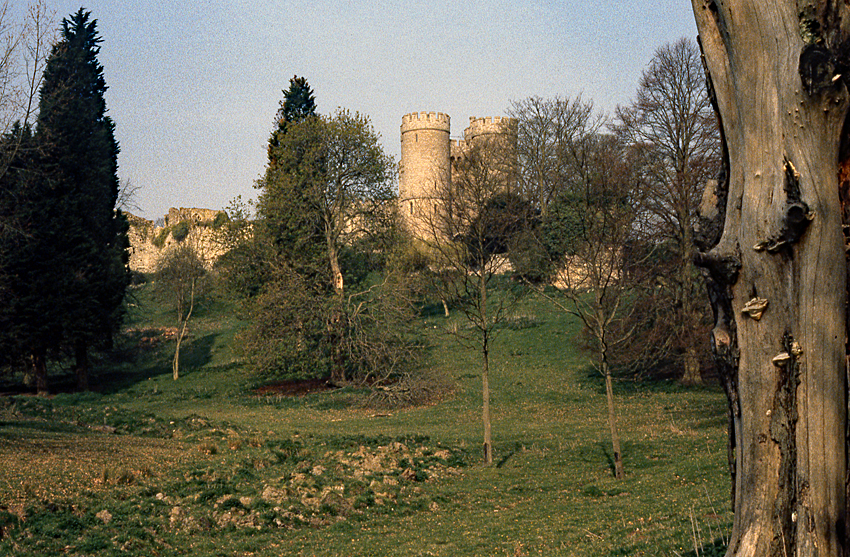
Saltwood Castle, Kent

Hythe was once defended by two castles, Saltwood and Lympne. Saltwood derives its name from the village in its shadow. During the reign of King Canute the manor of Saltwood was granted to the priory of Christ Church in Canterbury, but during the 12th century it became the home of Henry d'Essex, constable of England.

Thomas Becket had sought from King Henry II restoration of the castle as an ecclesiastical palace. Henry instead granted the castle to Ranulf de Broc. That the castle had been returned to Becket, as Archbishop of Canterbury, and remained a church property until the reign of Henry VIII, when Hythe and Saltwood were to be sequestrated to the Crown, suggests that some complicity by Baron de Broc was possible in the murder of Becket. It was during this time at Saltwood, on 28 December 1170, that four knights plotted Becket's death the following day. Hugh de Moreville was one of the knights, along with Reginald Fitzurse, William de Tracey and Richard le Breton.

From the moment Hythe came under Crown control, the senior official of the town was also a bailiff appointed by the Crown. This state of affairs (uniquely for a Cinque Port) remained until 1575 when Elizabeth I gave the town control of its affairs. The last Crown bailiff, John Bredgman, became the first mayor. A brass inscription bearing his name remains in the parish church, dated 1581.

== Cinque port Court of Shepway ==
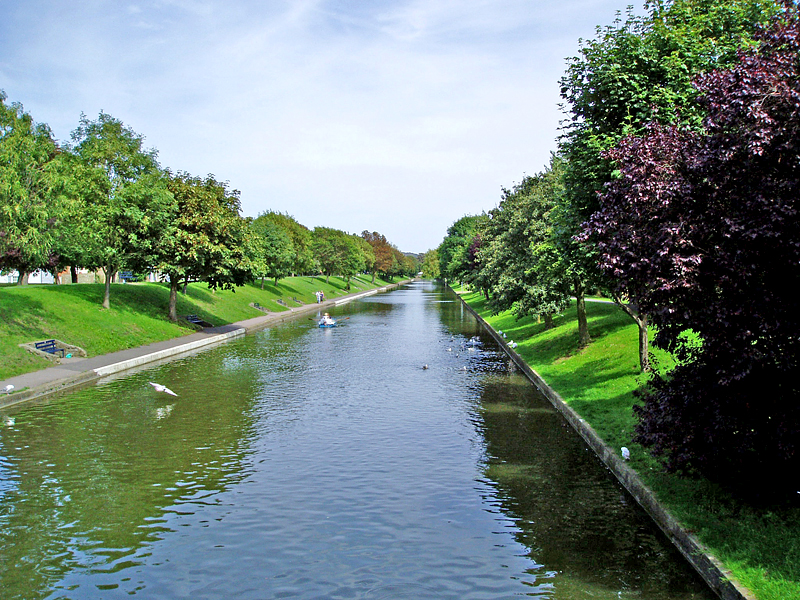
Royal Military Canal at Hythe

A monumental cross now indicates what was from 1358 a meeting place of the confederation of the Cinque ports, several miles west of Hythe, known then as "the Shepway crossroads". Shepway cross, erected in 1923, the monument to the Court of Shepway, is beside the Hythe to Lympne road (B2067). The lathe of Shepway was the Saxon name for south-east Kent, roughly corresponding with the modern District of Shepway, comprising Folkestone, Hythe, Romney Marsh and nearby villages as far north as Elham.

Many think this monument marks where the Lord Warden of the Cinque Ports held his court for Shepway, and it is referred to as the "Shepway Cross". In fact the Shepway Cross is a civic war memorial erected in 1923. It was placed on the top of Lympne Hill because that was traditionally the site of the Court of Shepway.

Shepway Cross was paid for and unveiled in August 1923 by Earl Beauchamp, the Lord Warden of the Cinque Ports. The Archbishop of Canterbury, Randall Davidson, attended the ceremony. The memorial now shows signs of decay. The lettering denoting the monument's true purpose is hardly legible.

== School of Musketry ==
The School of Musketry was established in Hythe in 1853.

== Romney, Hythe and Dymchurch Railway ==
Hythe is the northern terminus of the Romney, Hythe and Dymchurch Railway, running third-scale steam and diesel locomotives. The track runs parallel to the coast through Dymchurch and New Romney to Dungeness. The founders were Captain J Howey and Count Louis Zborowski. It opened in 1927. The trains run on a gauge of 15 inches (380 mm) and the track is nearly 14 miles (23 km) long. During the Second World War the service transported the Operation Pluto pipeline.

== Governance ==
Hythe is represented in Parliament as part of the Folkestone and Hythe constituency in the House of Commons.

== Local places of interest ==
- Brockhill Country Park
- Centuries
- Port Lympne Wild Animal Park & Gardens
- Romney, Hythe and Dymchurch Railway
- St Leonard's Church

== Sport and leisure ==
Hythe has a Non-League football club, Hythe Town F.C., who play at the Reachfields Stadium.

== Theatre ==
Folkestone & Hythe Operatic & Dramatic Society owns the Tower Theatre at Shorncliffe. It is a charitable organisation which performs several shows a year.

== Local media ==
=== Newspapers ===
Hythe has two paid-for newspapers, the Folkestone and Hythe Express (published by the KM Media Group) every Wednesday and the Folkestone Herald (published by Kent Regional News and Media). KentOnline.co.uk (published by the KM Media Group) also has a dedicated website for Hythe news. Free newspapers for the town include the Folkestone and Hythe Extra, part of the KM Group; and yourshepway, part of KOS Media. It also has a paid-for monthly magazine, Folkestone, Hythe & Romney Life. A new free community/lifestyle magazine for Hythe, Hythe Life Magazine, was launched in the summer of 2014.

=== Radio ===
The local radio station for Hythe is KMFM Shepway and White Cliffs Country. Cinque Ports Radio 100.2FM is the community radio station for Hythe and Romney Marsh and has been broadcasting since 7th March 2022 replacing Shoreline FM, now an online service, which had been broadcasting on 100.2FM from January 2020. Academy FM 105.9FM, the community radio station for Folkestone can also be received in parts of Hythe.

Hythe FM on 95.1FM was a restricted service radio licensed station which broadcast for several years during the time of the Hythe Venetian Fete. The people behind Hythe FM have now started broadcasting online since May 2022.

== In popular culture ==
- Hythe is the setting of BBC One comedy-drama series Back to Life.

== Notable people ==
- The novelist Elizabeth Bowen spent her childhood in Hythe and retired to 'Carbery' on Church Hill, overlooking the parish church, where she died.
- Kenneth Colley, Actor from Manchester, known for playing many parts, specially Admiral Piett in Star Wars lived in Hythe.
- Cyril Connolly and his parents, Major and Mrs Connolly, were living in Hythe when the First World War began.
- Saltwood Castle was the ancestral home of Lord Deedes and later home to Kenneth Clark, the art historian, and his son Alan Clark, Conservative minister, military historian and renowned diarist.
- The novelist Daphne du Maurier lived with her family at Hythe in the early years of the Second World War.
- Colonel Gaddafi, leader of Libya, was trained by the British army in Kent
- Edward Hulme (1812–1876), surgeon and hospital administrator in New Zealand, was born in Hythe
- Sir Henry Lucy was a parliamentary journalist who built (1883) 'Lucy's' on what is now Lucy's Hill in Hythe
- Lionel Lukin, credited with inventing the self-righting lifeboat, is buried in the parish.
- Ronald MacNab (1902–1962), cricketer
- Noel Redding, (1945–2003), bassist with the Jimi Hendrix Experience, gave his first public performance at Hythe Youth Club.
- Monte Saldo, early bodybuilder
- Francis Pettit Smith, inventor of the marine screw propeller, was born and brought up in Hythe; a plaque is on the wall above The Post Office in the High Street.
- Charles Wakefield, 1st Viscount Wakefield, philanthropist, founder of the Castrol Oil Company, Lord Mayor of London, a great benefactor of Hythe who lived at 'The Links' overlooking the town (destroyed by fire during 1960s)

== See also ==
- Hythe, Alberta
- Short Hythe, variant of the Short Sunderland
- Listed buildings in Hythe, Kent
