= Ranscombe Farm =

Nature reserve in Kent, England

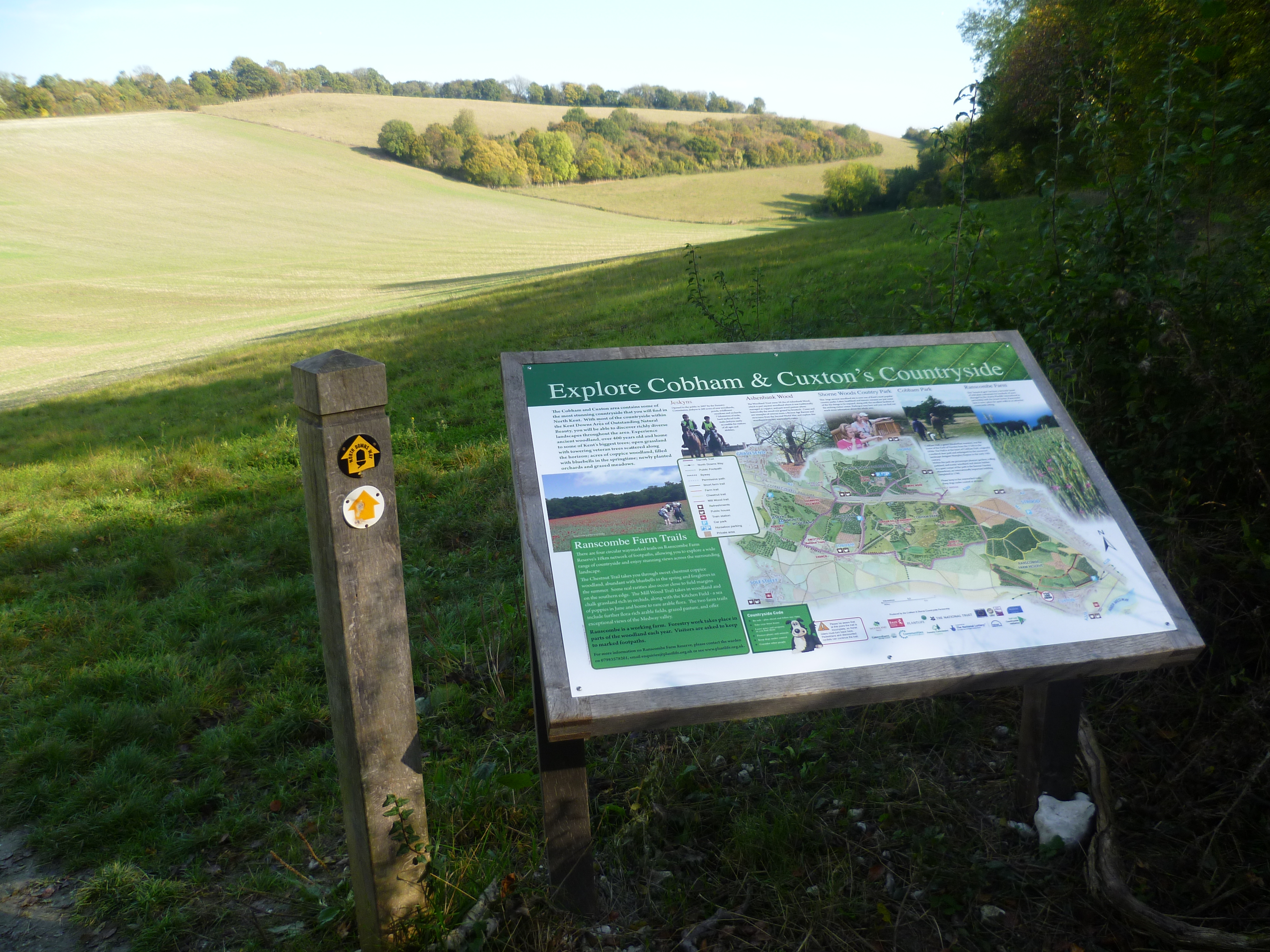
- Ranscombe Farm from the North Downs Way
- Interactive map of Ranscombe Farm
- Location: Cuxton, Kent, England
- Nearest city: Rochester
- Coordinates: 51°22′52″N 0°28′01″E
- Governing body: Plantlife
- Website: www.plantlife.org.uk/our-work/ranscombe-farm-nature-reserve/

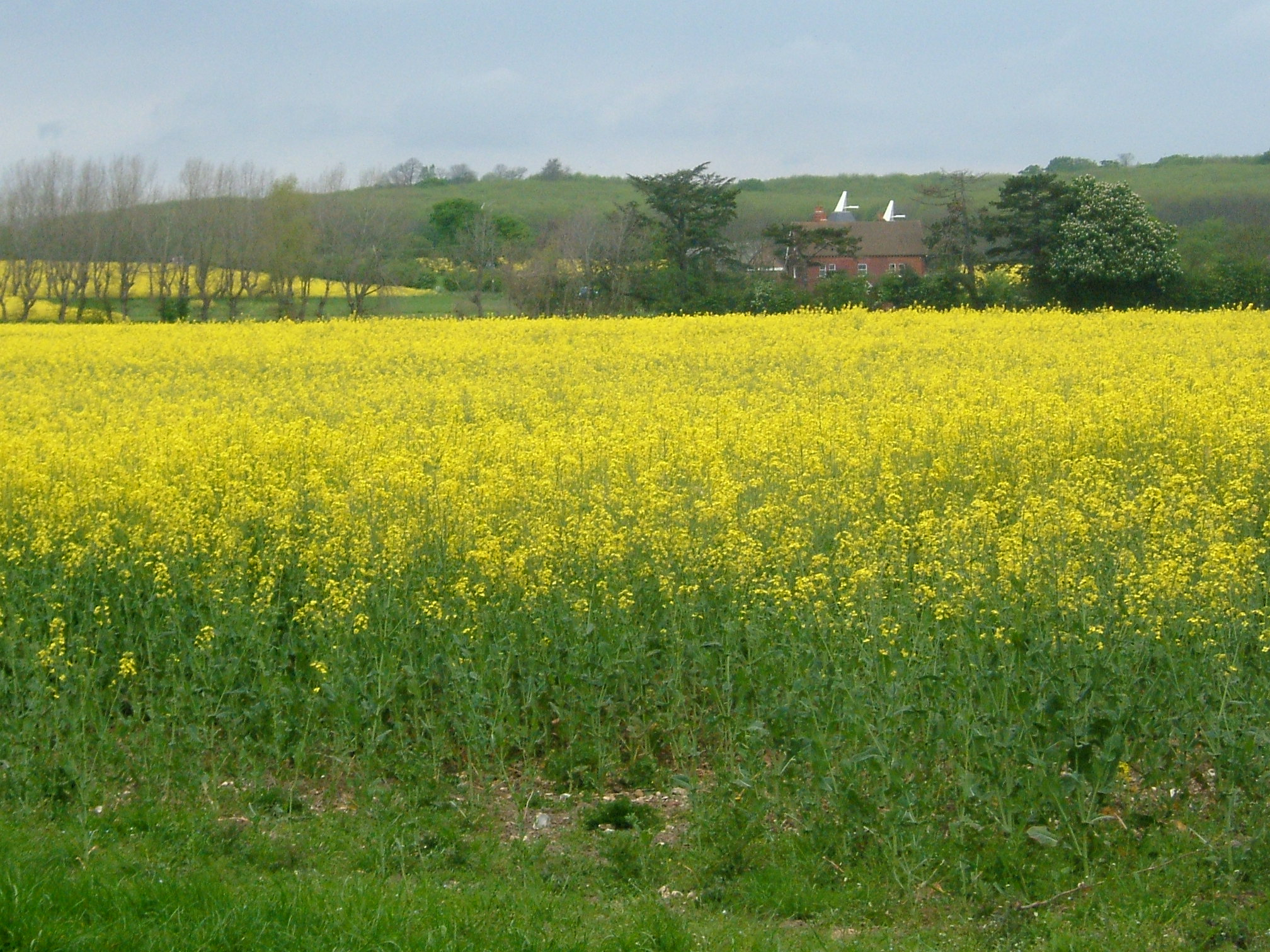
The farm buildings seen over a field of Oil Seed Rape

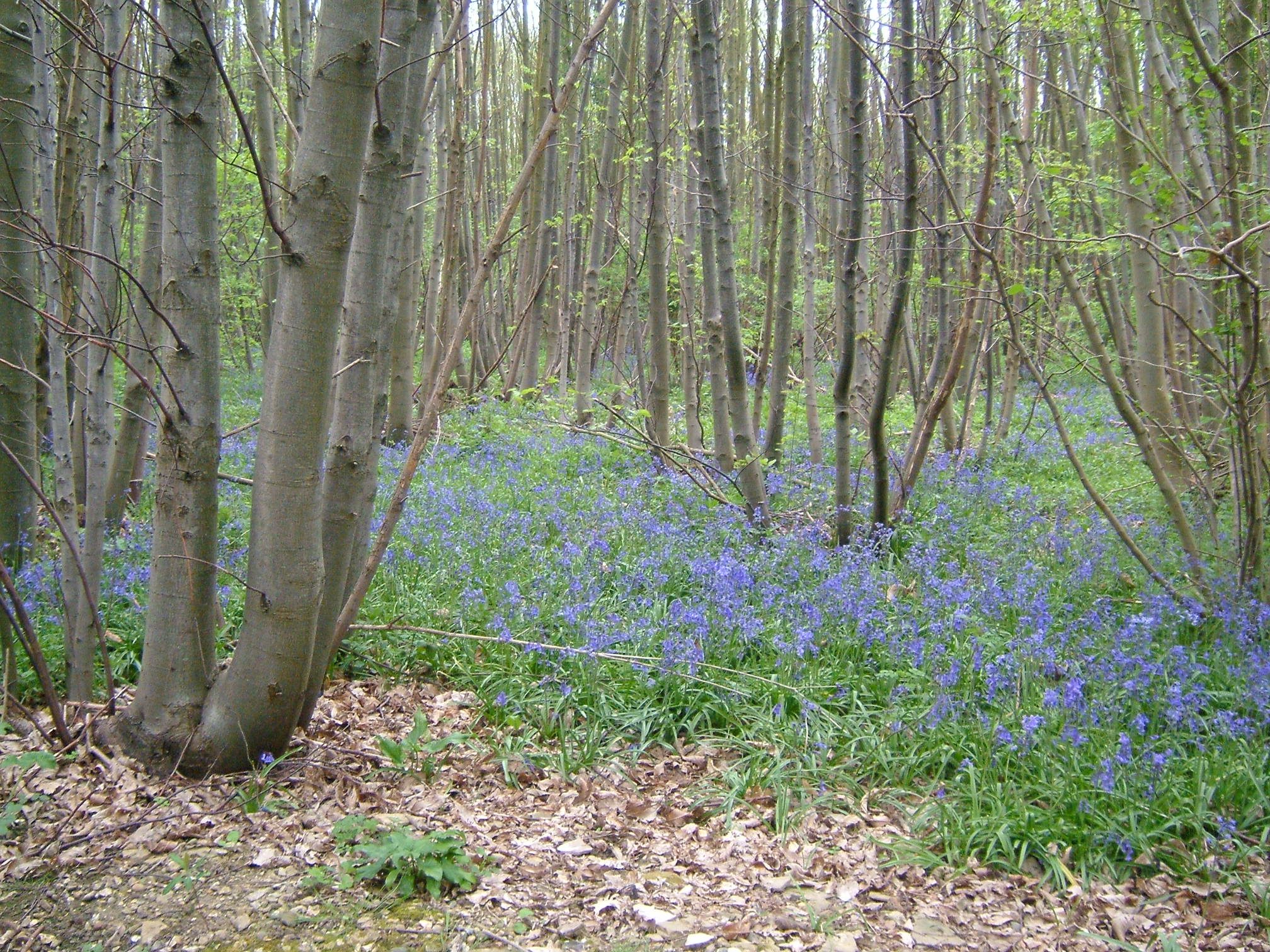
In April the woods are carpeted with bluebells.

Ranscombe Farm is a Plantlife Nature Reserve and working farm in Cuxton, Kent, England. The site is a botanically significant area, with parts included in the Cobham Woods Site of Special Scientific Interest (SSSI), and the entire farm situated within the Kent Downs Area of Outstanding Natural Beauty (AONB).

== Flora ==
The reserve is noted for its rare arable flora and chalk grassland species. Notable species include:

- Hairy Mallow
- Meadow Clary
- Ground Pine
- Lady Orchid (locally known as 'Fair Maidens of Kent')
- Corncockle

== Access ==
The reserve straddles the North Downs Way long-distance footpath. It is accessible by road via the A228 near Junction 2 of the M2. The nearest railway station is Cuxton.

Ranscombe Farm is a Plantlife Nature Reserve and working farm in Cuxton, Kent, England. Part of the site is included in the Cobham Woods Site of Special Scientific Interest, and the whole farm is within the Kent Downs Area of Outstanding Natural Beauty.

Ranscombe Farm Reserve works in partnership with five other sites in the local area. They are Shorne Woods Country Park, Jeskyns, Cobham Park, Ashenbank Wood and the Cobham Leisure Plots.

It has been a source for flower collectors for centuries. Nationally rare species, Hairy Mallow and Meadow Clary, were both collected from Ranscombe Farm, in 1699 and 1792 respectively. Other rarities include Ground Pine and Broad-leaved Cudweed and at least six species of orchid including Fly, Lady ('Fair Maidens of Kent') and Man Orchid.

The chalk grassland hosts a rich suite of plants including Wild Liquorice and Horseshoe Vetch.

The arable flora includes Corncockle, Blue Pimpernel, Night-flowering Catchfly, Narrow-fruited Cornsalad (Valerianella dentata) and Dense-flowered Fumitory.

== What to see and when ==
- April: Bluebell, Early purple orchid
- May: Lady Orchid, Fly Orchid, Man Orchid
- June: Meadow Clary, Hairy Mallow, Ground Pine, common milkwort
- July: Corncockle, Clustered Bellflower, Four species of poppy (Common, Rough, Prickly and Long-headed)

== Location ==
Railway Station: Cuxton
By Bus. Nu-Venture 151 to Cuxton.
By Bus. Arriva, 140 to Strood - Marlowe Park [Wells Rd] then Elgin Gardens then the underpass located behind Elgin Gardens.
By Bus. Arriva, 141 to Strood - Earl Estate then Albatross Avenue then the underpass located at the car park.
By Road. M2 to Junction 2, Carpark entrance on A228 200m on the right after exit roundabout.

Ranscombe Farm straddles the North Downs Way, long-distance footpath.
