= S. pratensis =

S. pratensis may refer to:

- Salvia pratensis, a perennial sage species
- Succisa pratensis, a flowering plant species
