= Jeskyns =

Park in Kent, England

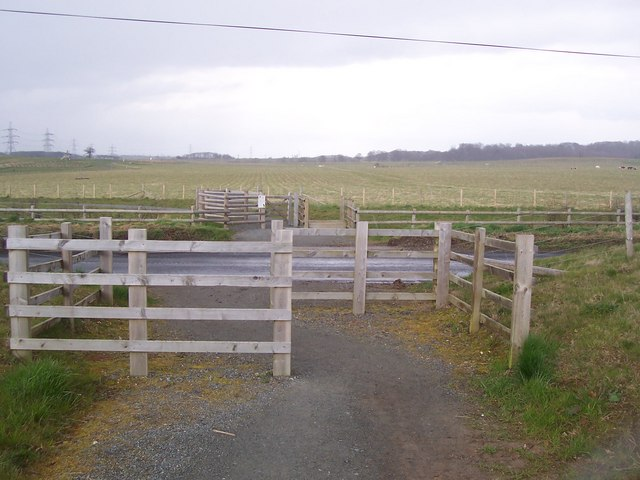
- Path in Jeskyns
- Interactive map of Jeskyns
- Coordinates: 51°24′14″N 0°23′14″E
- Area: 360 acres (150 ha)
- Created: 2006
- Operator: Forestry Commission
- Status: Open 7 days a week, dawn until dusk
- Website: www.forestryengland.uk/jeskyns

Jeskyns is a park near Cobham, in Kent, England. A former farm, it was reopened as a large open-space recreational area in 2007, with areas being developed as new wildlife habitats.

== History ==
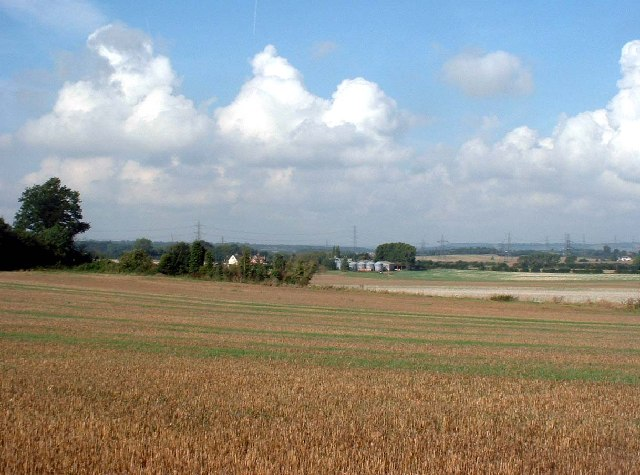
Jeskyn's Farm

This was once a large farm which was put on the market in 2005, following the death of its owner. The guide price for the land was between £1.1 million and £1.3 million. As one of John Prescott's last acts as the head of the Office of Deputy Prime Minister, money from the ODPM's sustainable communities fund was given to the Forestry Commission to buy the land and turn it into a community woodland. However when tractors ploughed up the arable crop fields and with them went around 60 nests full of newly-born skylarks and their eggs. A Forestry Commission spokesman later admitted that the ploughing was an "operational misjudgement which we regret". "We certainly had no intention of harming any birds," he said. "We have commissioned an ornithologist to advise us on the way forward."

The design of the new woodland, was similar to Thames Chase (another Forestry Commission Wood). The site is part of the Green Belt around Gravesend. The west part of the site is a Special Landscape Area and east part of the site is in the North Downs Area of Outstanding Natural Beauty.

Since then, 150,000 trees and shrubs have been planted, 2054 traditional orchard trees have been planted, 6.8 km (4 miles) of all accessible paths have been laid (this includes disabled friendly paths as well), 5556m2 of new ponds created (Henhurst Lake - wildlife lake and Ashenbank Pond - quiet, meadowland pond). 765 people planted trees, not including planting done by independent contractors, 145 tonnes of rubbish were removed from the site (including over 700 tyres, 3 cars and many washing machines). 13 local Cobham area schools and 14 uniformed children’s groups have been involved in the project.

The opportunity to reinstate elements of a traditional Kentish farm landscape was also being investigated by the Forestry Commission.

Jeskyns opened to the public in July 2007.

Jeskyns works in partnership with five other sites in the local area. They are Shorne Woods Country Park, Ranscombe Farm Reserve, Cobham Woods, Ashenbank Wood and the Cobham Leisure Plots.

== Facilities ==
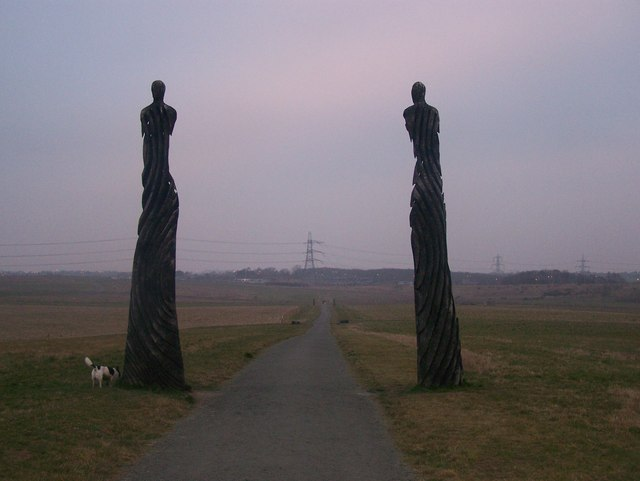
Sculptures in Jeskyns

The site has five areas for different uses:

- Jeskyns Wood - large newly planted woodland (mainly broadleaf trees) along the A2 transport corridor, adding to the current woodland habitats,
- Jeskyns Glades - this is a wildflower meadow, surrounded by pockets of naturalised woodland,
- Jeskyns Meadows - the site has various archaeological finds, these are protected by a large area of grazed meadowland, this also gives the added bonus of open views across the park,
- Jeskyns Orchards - has over 900 different varieties of cherry, plum, apple and pear trees planted to make up the 2504 tree traditional orchard,
- Jeskyns Grove - wildflower meadow open area, with a backdrop of informal woodland, with occasional orchard planting within,

Five marked trails lead around the site;- Court Wood Trail 1/4 mile (walkers), Henhurst Lake Walk 1 1/4mile (walkers and cyclists), Broomfield Loop 1 3/4 mile (walkers and cyclists), Orchard Walk 2miles (walkers and cyclists) and Horse trail 5miles.

Other major achievements for the site include the creation of ‘natural play features’ including a tree house, a cone pool (based on a children's ball pool but with pine cones instead of plastic balls) and a sandpit, and a number of environmental art sculptures. Mostly designed and created by Walter Bailey . Most of the huge figures have come from a single piece of oak or sweet chestnut and been carved by a chainsaw.

There is a children's play area and an enclosed area for dog training. The site has a car park and in 2013 was granted planning permission for a cafeteria and toilets.

== Location ==
Situated off the A2 dual carriageway at Sole Street/Gravesend junction. Along Henhurst Road towards Sole Street. The car park is on the left.
