= Shorne Woods Country Park =

Park in Kent, England

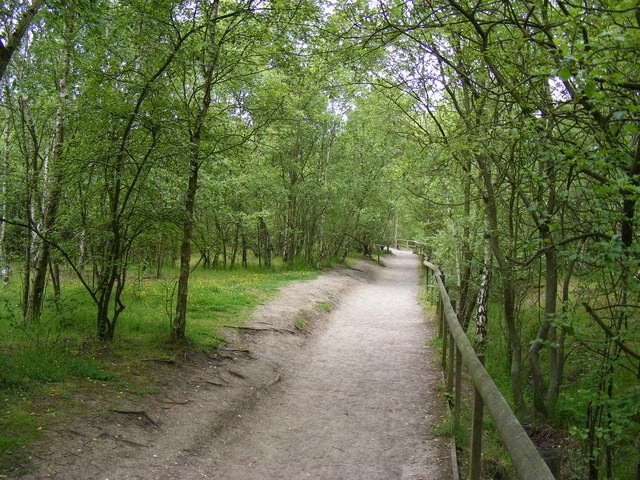
- Footpath in Shorne Woods
- Interactive map of Shorne Woods Country Park
- Coordinates: 51°24′13″N 0°25′12″E
- Created: 1987
- Operator: Kent County Council,
- Status: Open 7 days a week, dawn until dusk
- Website: Kent Country page

Shorne Woods Country Park is located between Strood and Gravesend, in the English county of Kent. It was once part of a large estate, later passed to the county council to be used as a country park.

Shorne Woods Country Park shown within Kent (grid reference TQ684700)

== History ==
This park was once part of the large Cobham Hall Estate. The main entrance to the Hall leads through the park, with various other carriage rides around the estate. Then from the 1930s to the 1970s, part of the estate was leased by Lord Darnley, and was used for clay extraction by a cement company, drawing from a clay pit beneath the ancient woodland. Then in 1987, Kent County Council took ownership of the 288 acres (117 ha) of land, and with the help of Gravesham Borough Council, it was turned into a country park and opened to the public.

== Facilities ==
It has large areas of ancient woodland and heathland meadows. The former claypit is being returned to nature (with woodland and wetland areas). The wetland ponds have many species of dragonflies, which breed in the park. A large part of the park is a Site of Special Scientific Interest (SSSI) with the designation Shorne and Ashenbank Woods.

The park also is accredited with a Green Flag Award by Natural England.

The country park has many colour-coded waymarked paths around the country park. These include; Purple Route - Easy 1.4 km, Red Route - Medium, Explorer Trail - 3.7 miles (6.0 km), Heritage Trail - 2.2 miles (3.5 km). A longer trail (the Darmley Trail - 6.2 miles (10.0 km)) has also been developed taking area outside of Shorne Woods park, including Darnley Mausoleum, Jeskyns (a one-time farm of 360 acres (150 ha), which is being turned into a greenspace area and country park by the Forestry Commission ), Ranscombe Farm and Cobham Hall. There is also a horse riding and cycle path route around the park. As well as a Sensory Garden for the less abled. Disabled visitors can also use 4*4 electro-scooters (called a Tramper), which can be hired from the visitor centre.

The park also has an eco-friendly visitor centre designed by Lee Evans Partnership and costing £1.6m. It was runner up in 2007 Kent Design Awards. It was the first structure to be constructed using Sweet chestnut in the UK. The mainly sweetchestnut structure, also used Oak thinnings were used from Park Wood, Kent near Appledore, as the window and roof joinery.

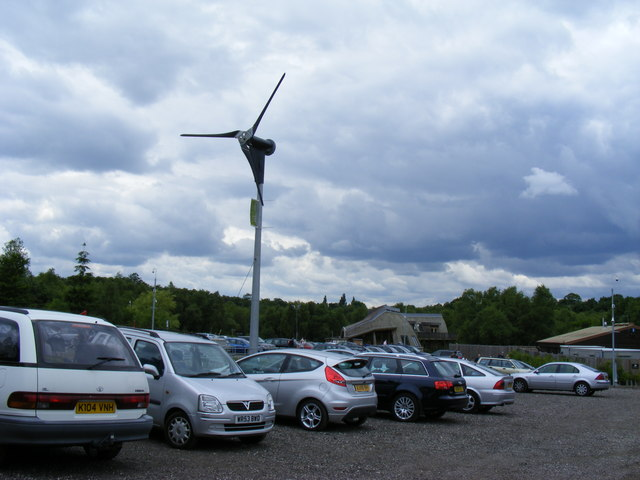
Shorne Woods Country Park Visitor Centre

It is mostly powered by a wind turbine. The centre has a shop, display boards and cafe.

To the east of the park, are the Furzey Leas Lakes. Steps Lake is 0.5 acres (2,000 m^{2}), and Long Lake is 0.65 acres (2,600 m^{2}) These are used as angler permitted lakes, on Day Tickets (obtained from the visitor centre).

Since 2006, the park has had a Community Archaeologist as funded by the Heritage Lottery. Finds from the Stone Age (flint tools) to World War II items have been found. Most work has been taken place around the remains of Randall Manor. This was the home of Sir Henry de Cobham who lived there in 1360 to 1400. The house would have been similar to Ightham Mote but without a moat. The excavations show that it was a substantial timber-framed hall house with a stone built end. It had a garderobe and a separate kitchen making it a high status building. It had outbuildings and three fishponds. It was demolished in 1500 and the building materials re-used in the nearby Cobham Hall, now a girls' school.

More details of what was found in the park can be seen at the Kent County Council website. One of the '100 Walks in Kent' Book starts in the country park, before heading towards Owletts (a National Trust House), Cobham and Cobham Hall and then returning to the park.

== How to get there ==
Situated off the A2 Dual carriageway between Gravesend and Rochester. The main entrance for cars is along Brewer's Road leading to Shorne.

== Parkrun ==
Shorne Woods Country park is also home to a parkrun which is a free timed 5k event fully staffed by volunteers. The first Shorne Woods parkrun took place on 30 March 2013.

== Images ==
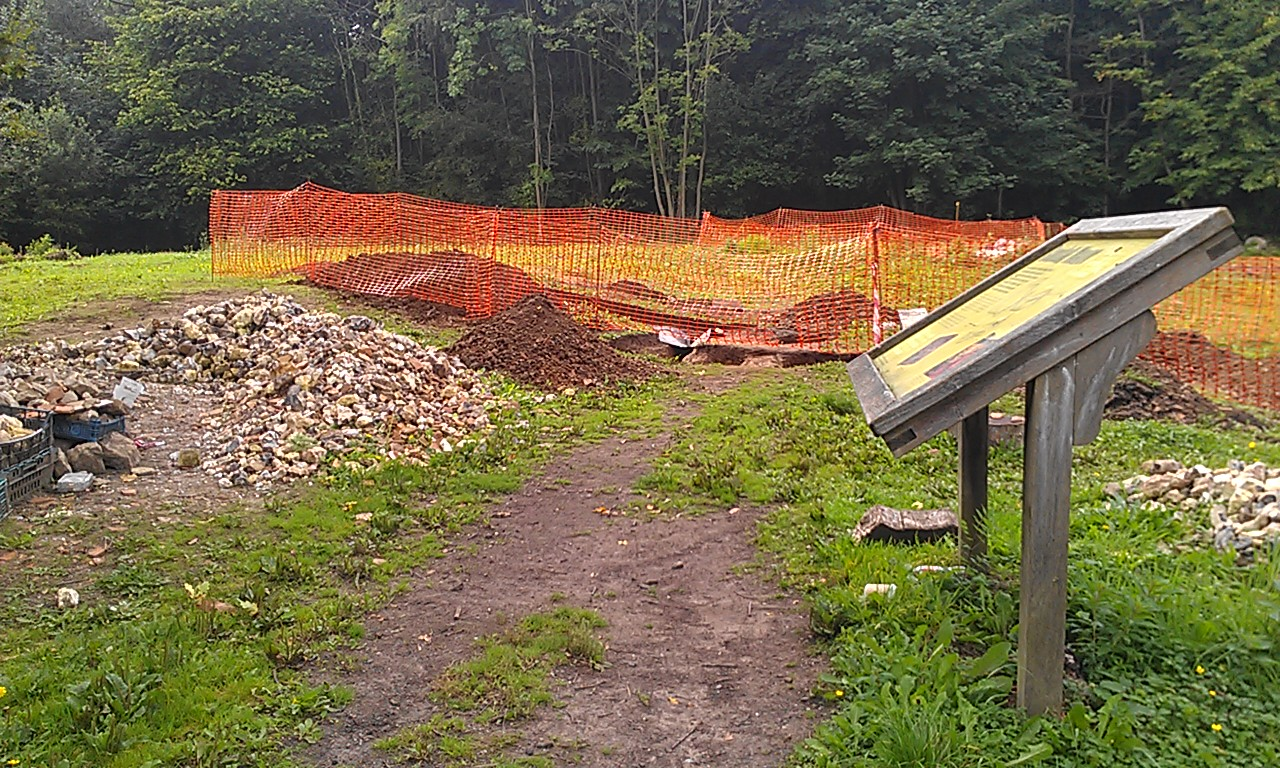
The site of Randall Manor.

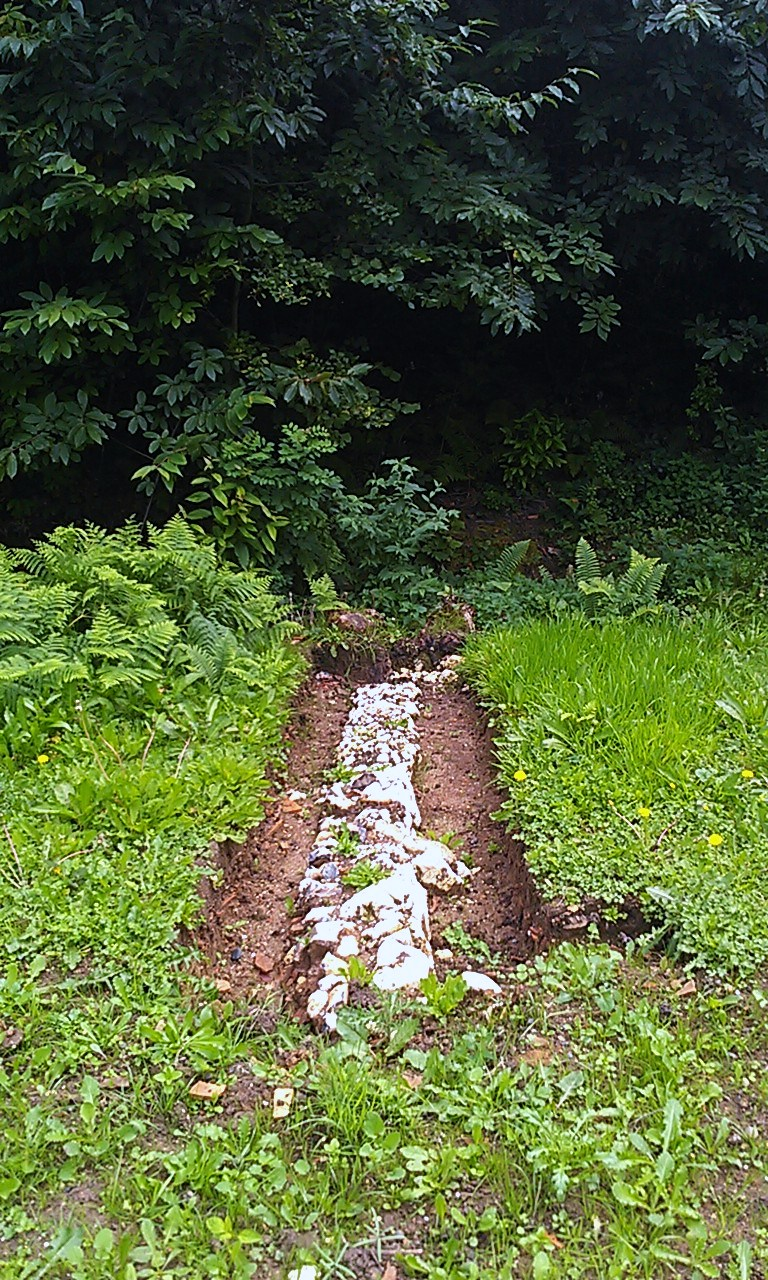
Exposed chalk masonry at Randall Manor.

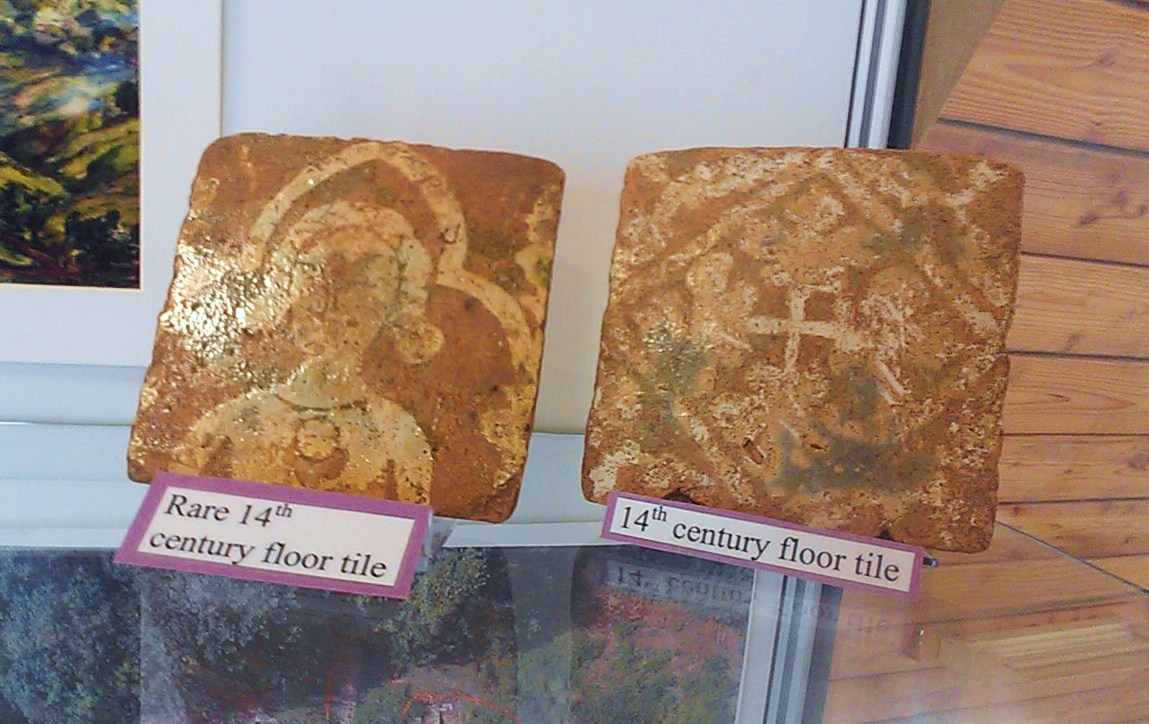
Fourteenth-century floor tiles from Randall Manor.

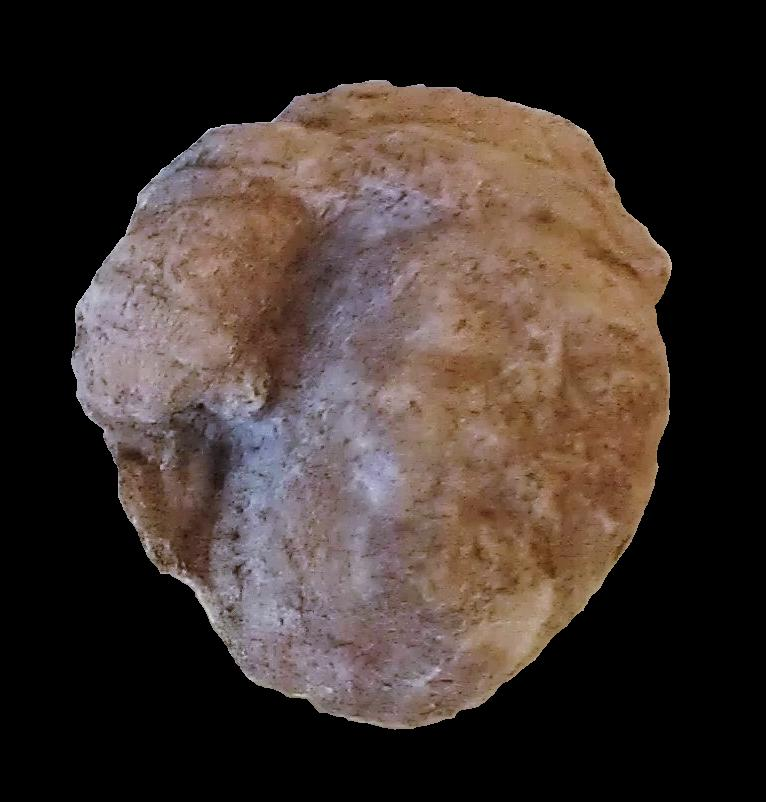
Carved sculptural head from Randall Manor.
