= Plantlife =

Wild plant conservation charity

- Formation: 1989; 37 years ago
- Legal status: Nonprofit company
- Location: Brewery House, 36 Milford Street, Salisbury, Wiltshire, SP1 2AP, UK
- Region served: UK, Isle of Man, Global
- Members: 69 employees (August 2022); 22,814 members (2024)
- Chief Executive: Jane Madgwick
- Main organ: Board of Trustees
- Website: Plantlife.org.uk

Plantlife is a wild plant conservation charity, since April 2024 limited by guarantee as Plantlife International. As of 2024, it manages 24 nature reserves covering 4500 acres across both the United Kingdom and the Isle of Man. HM King Charles III is the patron of the charity.

== History ==
Plantlife was founded in 1989. Its first president was Professor David Bellamy. Peter James was also a founder member and early vice-president.

Its president is Philip Mould OBE and its chairman is Professor David Hill CBE. English gardener and television presenter Rachel De Thame is their vice-president. The chief executive is Jane Madgwick, who took up her role on 1 July 2025.

== Function ==
Plantlife's principal activities in Britain include the management of 4,500 acres (18 km^{2}) of rare and important plant habitats as nature reserves, lobbying and campaigning in support of wild plant conservation, and organising surveys aimed at generating public interest in wild plants. Plantlife helps run an annual National Plant Monitoring Survey, and a rare species conservation programme, "Back from the Brink". It was a lead partner of HRH the Prince of Wales' Coronation Meadows project.

Although much of Plantlife's work is centred on plants, it is also involved in the conservation of fungi. Its work in this area includes surveying waxcap grasslands and publishing a strategy for conserving fungi in the UK.

The group also has an international programme which includes projects on medicinal plant conservation and sustainable use in the Himalayas and East Africa.

== Plantlife nature reserves ==
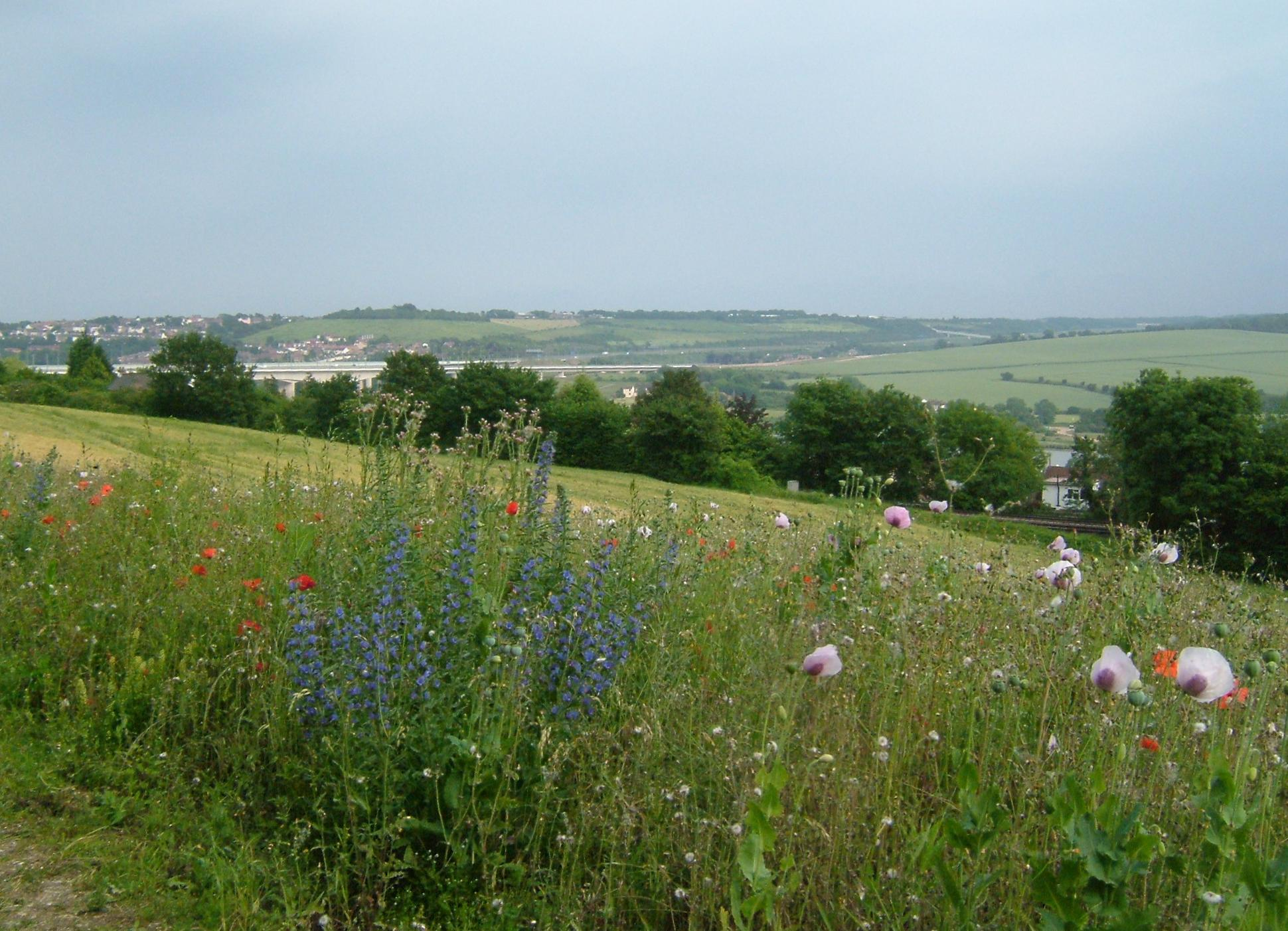
Ranscombe Farm Reserve in June 2007

Plantlife owns and manages, or manages on behalf of the owners, a number of nature reserves. The list below may change over time depending on changing agreements on land ownership and management.

- Long Herdon and Grange Meadows, Buckinghamshire
- Munsary Peatlands, Caithness
- Cae Blaen-dyffryn, Carmarthenshire
- Greena Moor, Cornwall
- Augill Pasture, (Note: Augill Pasture is owned by Plantlife and leased to the Cumbria Wildlife Trust. It is jointly managed by Plantlife and the Trust.) Cumbria
- Deep Dale, Derbyshire
- Ryewater Farm, Dorset
- Caeau Tan y Bwlch, Gwynedd
- Davies Meadows, Herefordshire
- Joan's Hill Farm, Herefordshire
- The Lugg Meadows, Herefordshire
- Moaney and Crawyn's Meadows, Isle of Man
- Queendown Warren, (Note: Queendown Warren is managed by the Kent Wildlife Trust, and part-owned by Plantlife) Kent
- Ranscombe Farm, Kent
- Thompson Meadow, North Yorkshire
- Three Hagges Woodmeadow, North Yorkshire
- Winskill Stones, North Yorkshire
- Seaton Meadows, Rutland
- Skylark Meadows, Somerset
- Side Farm Meadows, Staffordshire
- Winks Meadow, Suffolk
- Furnace Meadow and Brick Kiln Rough, West Sussex
- Stockwood Meadows, Worcestershire

== County Flowers competition ==
In 2002 Plantlife ran a competition to select county flowers for all counties of the UK. The general public was invited to vote for the bloom they felt most represented their county. The list was declared in 2004.

Although sometimes contested, all have, to date, stuck. The one exception was the county flower of Norfolk: originally Alexanders won the vote. However, a campaign led by the Eastern Daily Press was successful in requesting a change to the poppy, which was felt to be more representative.

== The Back from the Brink programme ==
Plantlife's "Back from the Brink" programme was initiated in 1991. Its intention was to focus conservation efforts on some of the rarest plant species in Britain. It initially concentrated on vascular plants but was extended to cover non-vascular ("lower") plants and fungi. As of 2006, 101 species were covered by the programme. The programme included survey work to establish information about populations of these species, monitoring of populations to identify change over time and the factors relating to this, research into ecological requirements of the species, and site management work aimed at maintaining or restoring habitat conditions suitable for these species.

Since 2008 the programme has gradually expanded to include a much larger list of species, this is in response to the publication of both the UK Red List and UK Biodiversity Action Plan. To effectively deliver conservation of an ever expanding list of rare species the work will be directed at habitats, where it is hoped that suites of species will respond.

== Important Plant Areas ==
In 2007, Plantlife announced the establishment of 150 Important Plant Areas (or IPAs) across the UK. These areas were nominated for their internationally important wild plant populations. Since then they have been actively raising awareness of these ecologically important habitats and encouraging their long-term protection and improvement through the adoption of an 'ecosystem-based' conservation approach.

The IPA programme is endorsed by national conservation organisations including the RSPB and the Wildlife Trusts, and also by UK government bodies including Natural England, Scottish Natural Heritage and the Countryside Council for Wales.

Plantlife's international team has had some success in spreading the concept abroad.

== No Mow May ==
The No Mow May initiative encourages gardeners in the UK to not mow their lawn in the month of May so that plant diversity is increased and nectar can be produced for insects.

== See also ==
- List of extinct plants of the British Isles
