= Queendown Warren =

Protected area in Kent, England

Coordinates: 51.336°N 0.623°E

- Site of Special Scientific Interest
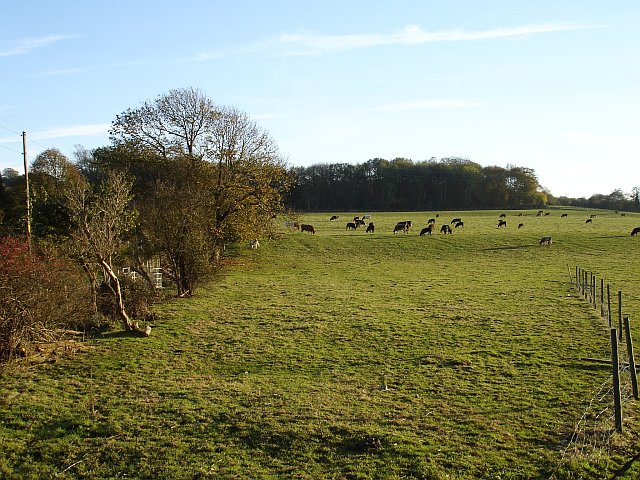
- Location of Queendown Warren.
- Area of search: Kent
- Grid reference: TQ 828 629
- Interest: Biological
- Area: 22.2 hectares (55 acres)
- Notification date: 1983
- Location map: Magic Map

Queendown Warren is a 22.2-hectare (55-acre) biological Site of Special Scientific Interest south-east of Rainham in Kent. It is a Local Nature Reserve, a Nature Conservation Review site, Grade 2, and a Special Area of Conservation. It is in the Kent Downs Area of Outstanding Natural Beauty. It is managed by the Kent Wildlife Trust, and part of it is owned by Plantlife.

== History ==
The reserve covers almost 80 hectares (198 acres) and comprises several distinct sections. The original reserve, which was a rabbit warren in the Middle Ages, forms the current reserve's core. It has probably been open downland for many hundreds of years and has an internationally important community of grassland orchids.

A major extension to the reserve was made in 1999 with the addition of pasture on the opposite side of the valley facing the Main Bank. This is being managed to encourage colonisation of species from the original reserve. In 2003 40 hectares (99 acres) hectares of arable land opposite the Main Bank were added, doubling the size of the reserve. Over time this will be restored to prime wildlife-friendly land.

== Flora ==
Queendown has the usual plants of chalk grassland, and orchids are well represented, particularly the fragrant orchid, with scattered groups of early spider, bee and man orchids. Later in the year autumn lady's-tresses may be found. A good variety of chalk grassland butterflies can be seen in summer, including the Adonis Blue, re-introduced in 2002. At the bottom of the bank, there is a colony of rabbits which, together with grazing cattle, help to maintain the short sward, essential for the maintenance of many orchid populations. The West Bank has several patches of fly orchid and white helleborine in the scrub and woodland edges. Some particularly good examples of the many large beech trees on the reserve can be seen in this section.

Potters Wood contains native broad leaved trees - oak, ash, beech, birch and wild cherry - and some sweet chestnut coppice managed by traditional methods. The southern part of the wood is on the chalk and has the remnants of many large beech trees which fell during the storm of October 1987. This area is especially good for observing adders.

== Access ==
There is access from Warren Lane, which goes through the site.
