= Shorne =

Village in Kent, England

Coordinates: 51.412943°N 0.432235°E

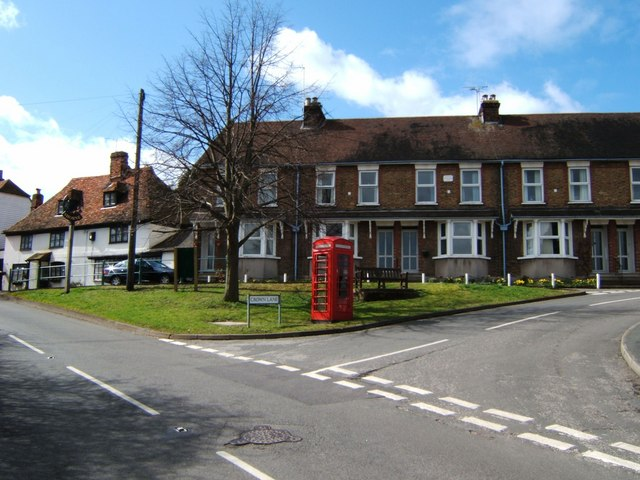
- The old post office and the top of Crown Lane

- Location within Kent
- Population: 2,487 (2011 census including Thong)
- OS grid reference: TQ692710
- District: Gravesham
- Shire county: Kent
- Region: South East
- Country: England
- Sovereign state: United Kingdom
- Post town: Gravesend
- Postcode district: DA12
- Dialling code: 01474
- Police: Kent
- Fire: Kent
- Ambulance: South East Coast
- UK Parliament: Gravesham

Shorne is a village and civil parish in the borough of Gravesham in Kent, England. The parish lies 3 miles (4.8 km) east of Gravesend. Most of the land is well-drained but its marshes, the Shorne Marshes reach down to the Thames Estuary and are an SSSI amid the North Kent Marshes on the Hoo Peninsula proper.

== History ==
Shorne Barrow (or tumulus) and Randalls Wood Barrow are indications of Stone Age occupation.

Randall Manor was a 14th-century manor, the remains of which are in Shorne Woods Country Park.

== Demographics ==
According to the census results for 2001 there were 2,485 people in 1,028 households in the Parish of Shorne. Of those residents between the ages of 16 and 74, 60% had a higher qualification (at level 2 to 5) and 86% of the dwellings were owner occupied. The population of Shorne Parish at the 2011 census was 2487 residents in 1033 households.[2]

== Transport ==
In April 2017, it was announced that the government choice for the Lower Thames Crossing was for a tunnel under the Thames between East Tilbury and Shorne.

== Places of interest ==
Much of upper Shorne is a conservation area with thirteen listed buildings and many others of interest. These include:

Pipes Place is in Forge Lane almost opposite Little St, Katherines. A local magistrate, Richard Parker lived on the site in 1642. Jarvis Maplesden the grandson of a local tanner purchased the house early in the 18th century along with twenty acres of land, which included St. Katharine's Chapel. Several generations of the Maplesden family lived in the house and there are gravestones bearing the Maplesden name still in the churchyard. The Maplesden family is responsible for its present build and design in the Georgian style. In about 1870, George Arnold, Mayor of Gravesend, bought and restored the ruined chapel.
