= Augill Pasture =

Nature reserve in Cumbria, England

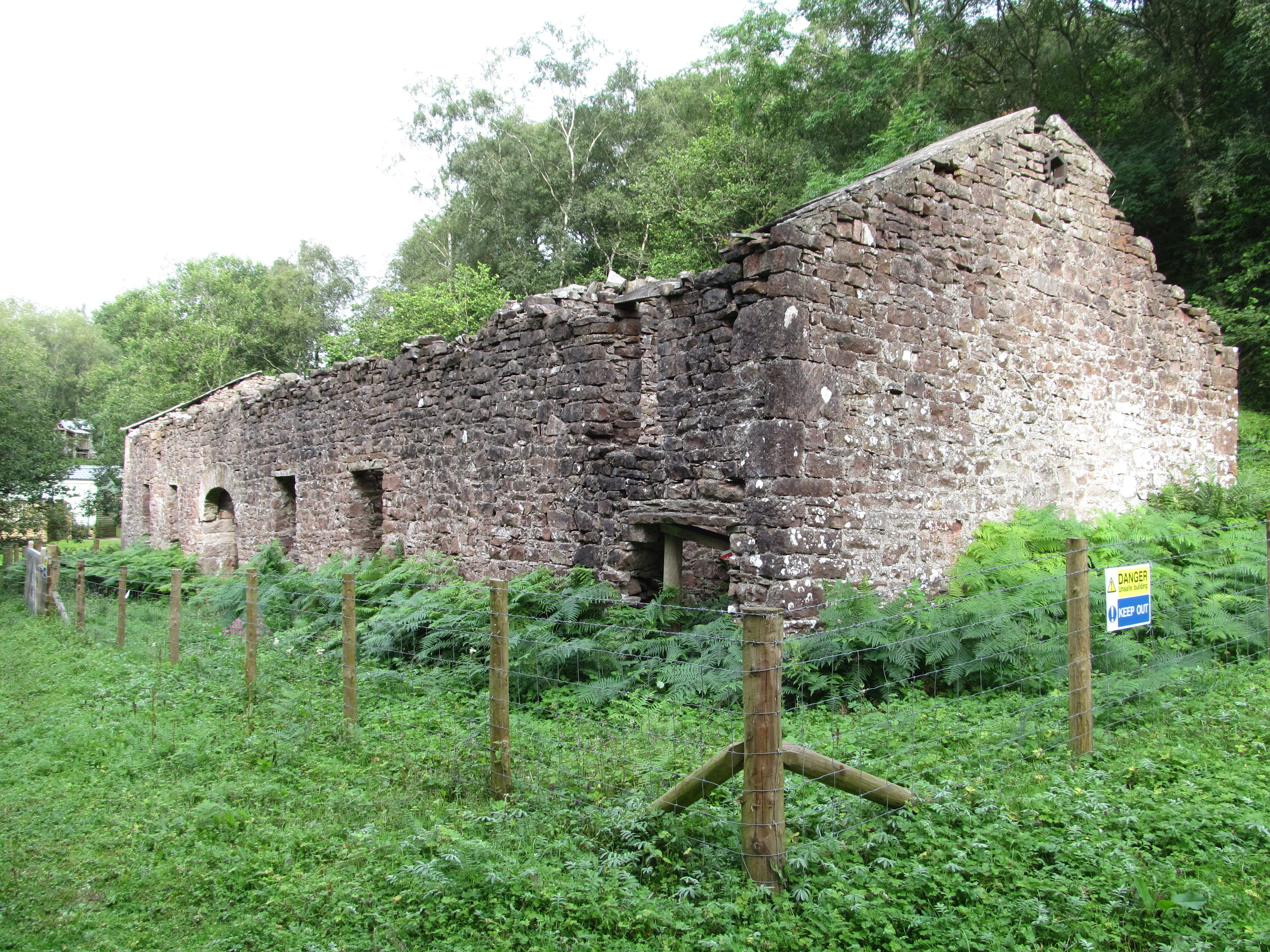
- The former lead smelting mill

- Location within Cumbria
- Interactive map of Augill Pasture
- Location: Near Brough, Cumbria
- OS grid: NY 815 146
- Coordinates: 54°31′36″N 2°17′09″W
- Area: 3 hectares (7.4 acres)
- Operator: Cumbria Wildlife Trust; Plantlife
- Designation: Site of Special Scientific Interest; Special Area of Conservation
- Website: www.cumbriawildlifetrust.org.uk/nature-reserves/augill-pasture

Augill Pasture is a nature reserve of the Cumbria Wildlife Trust, near Brough in Cumbria, England. It is an area of upland hay meadow, and there are the remains of a 19th-century lead smelting mill within the reserve.

== Description ==
The reserve, area 3 hectares (7.4 acres), is owned by Plantlife, and since 1998 has been leased to Cumbria Wildlife Trust. It is managed by Plantlife and the Trust. It is a Site of Special Scientific Interest, and a Special Area of Conservation.

It is an upland hay meadow; such areas lie at altitude 200–400m in upland valleys of northern England and Scotland, which have been managed non-intensively as hay meadows. It is estimated that there are less than 1,000 hectares (2,500 acres) in northern England.

Within the reserve is a former lead smelting mill, built in 1843 by the North Stainmore Mining Company to smelt lead ore from nearby mines. It is a scheduled monument, and is leased by the North Pennines Heritage Trust. It was powered by water from Augill Beck, and was in use until the late 19th century. The area beside it was used for grazing pit ponies.

== Wildlife ==
An upland hay meadow is a habitat for a particularly wide range of species. Between May and September, flowers to be seen include globe flower, lady's mantle, wood crane's-bill, great burnet and devil's-bit scabious. Orchids include frog orchid, fragrant orchid and twayblade.

By the mill there is woodland of birch, ash and willow, with an undergrowth of hazel and rowan.

Management of the reserve includes cutting an area of rushes most years. The grassland is grazed by sheep during autumn and winter.

== Details for visitors ==
There is a car park. A circular walking trail leads around the reserve, length 0.5 kilometres (0.3 mi); there are steps in the woods where the ground is steep. Visitors make their own way through the meadow. There is no access to the smelting mill.
