= Shorne and Ashenbank Woods =

Woodland in Kent, England

Coordinates: 51.403°N 0.414°E

- Site of Special Scientific Interest
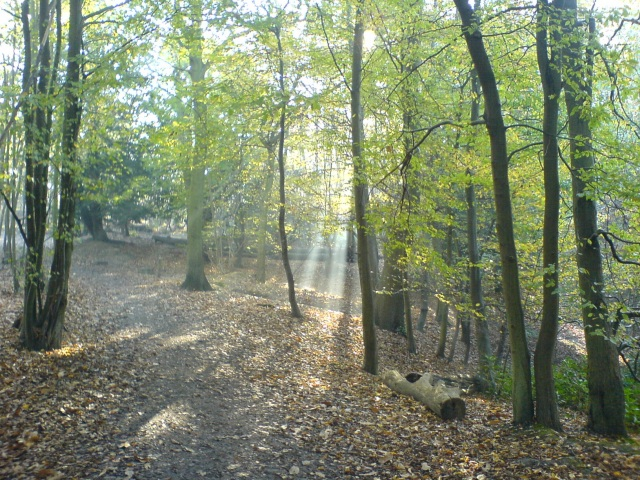
- Location of Shorne and Ashenbank Woods.
- Area of search: Kent
- Grid reference: TQ 680 699
- Interest: Biological
- Area: 197.4 hectares (488 acres)
- Notification date: 1988
- Location map: Magic Map

Shorne and Ashenbank Woods is a 197.4-hectare (488-acre) biological Site of Special Scientific Interest between Rochester and Gravesend in Kent. Part of it is Shorne Woods Country Park.

These woods have diverse and important invertebrates, especially dragonflies, beetles and true bugs, including the rare beetles Mordella holomelaena and Peltodytes caesus. Several clay workings have been landscaped to create shallow ponds designed for wildlife.

There is public access to the site.
