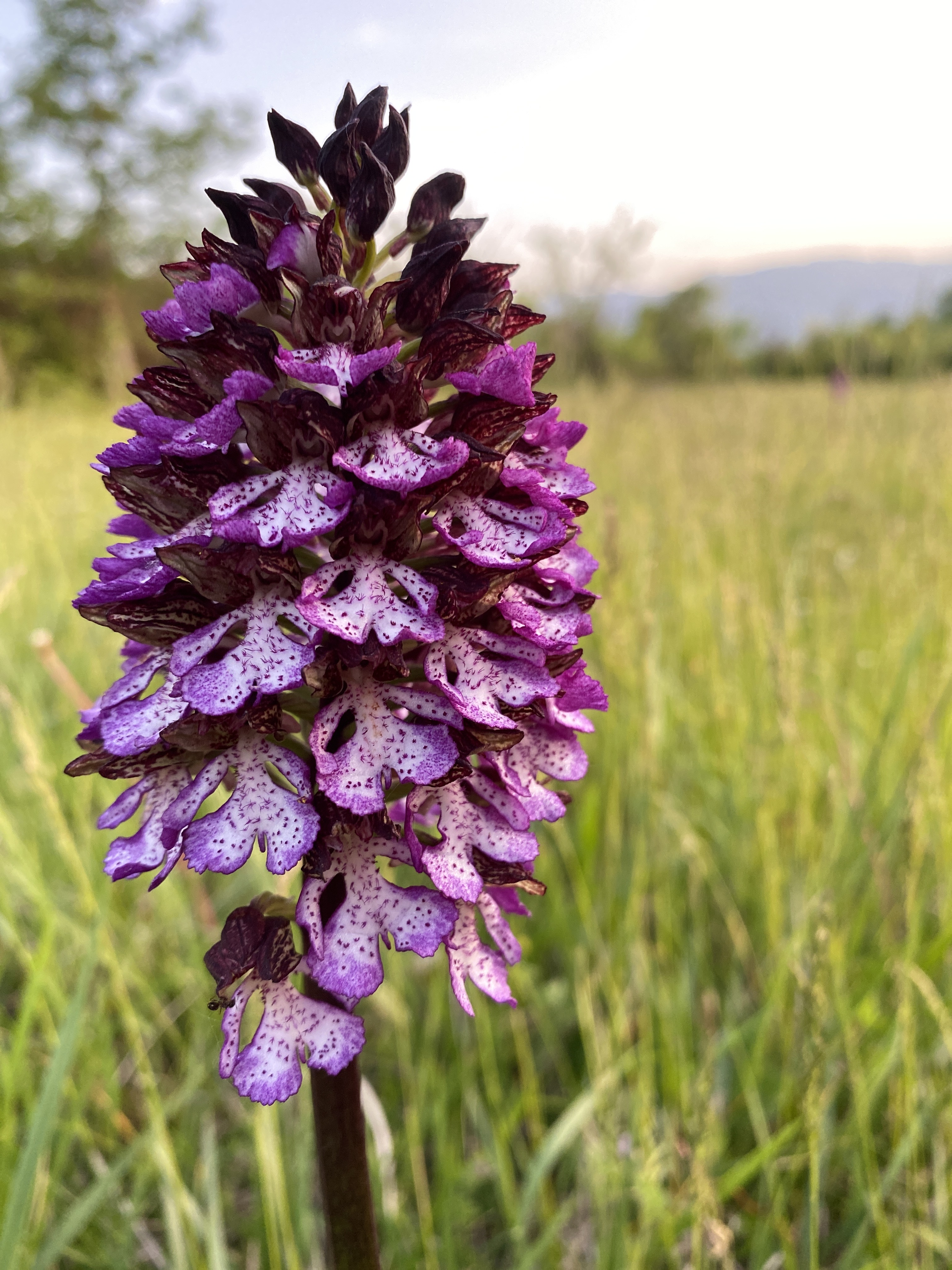

Scientific classification
- Kingdom: Plantae
- Clade: Tracheophytes
- Clade: Angiosperms
- Clade: Monocots
- Order: Asparagales
- Family: Orchidaceae
- Subfamily: Orchidoideae
- Genus: Orchis
- Species: O. purpurea

Binomial name
- Orchis purpurea Huds.

Synonyms
- Orchis fuscata Pall.; Orchis fusca Jacq.; Orchis moravica Jacq.; Orchis militaris Hornem.; Strateuma grandis Salisb.; Orchis maxima K.Koch; Orchis caucasica Regel; Orchis lokiana H.Baumann

= Orchis purpurea =

Species of orchid

Orchis purpurea, the lady orchid, is a herbaceous plant belonging to the genus Orchis of the family Orchidaceae.

== Description ==
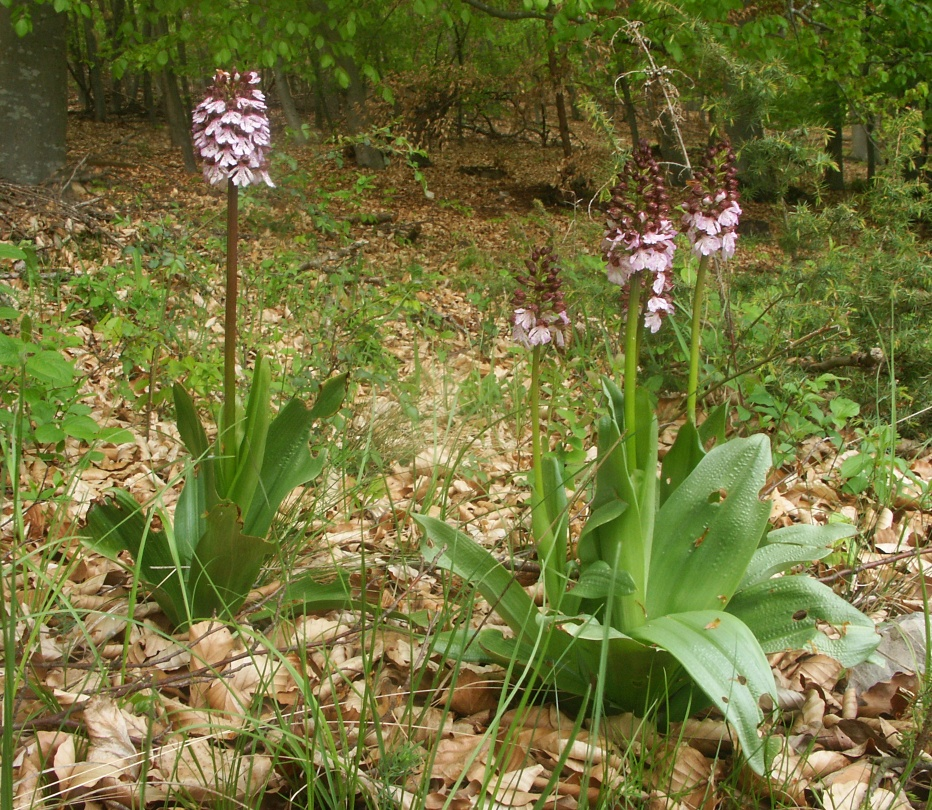
Group of plants

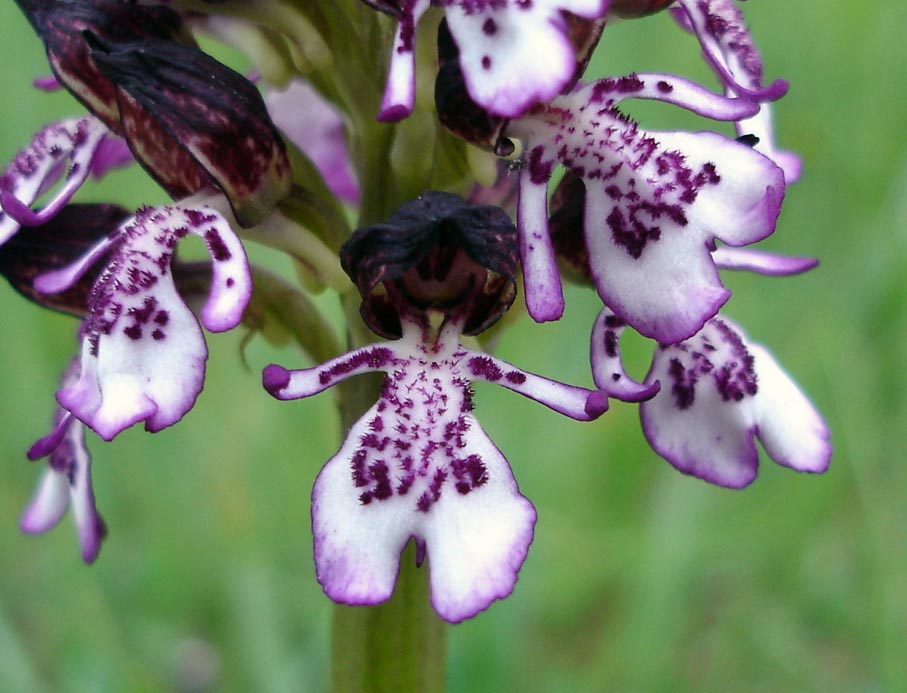
Inflorescence

Orchis purpurea reaches on average 30–100 centimetres (12–39 in) of height. The leaves are broad and oblong-lanceolate, forming a rosette about the base of the plant and surrounding the flower spike. They are fleshy and bright green, and can be up to 15 cm long. The inflorescence is densely covered with up to 50 flowers. The sepals and upper petals are violaceous or purple (hence the Latin name purpurea of the species). The flower's labellum is pale pink or white, with a center spotted by clusters of violaceous or purple hairs. It is divided into three lobes; the outer two are small and narrow, and the inner is large, rounded, and heart-shaped. Flowering occurs in late April to June.

== Range and habitat ==
This orchid can be found in most parts of Europe, northern Africa, Turkey and the Caucasus. It usually grows in sloping woodlands, particularly in mixed deciduous / oak forests, but occasionally occur in meadows. It prefers limestone or chalk soil and partially shaded locations at an altitude of 0–1,350 metres (0–4,429 ft) above sea level.

== Identification ==
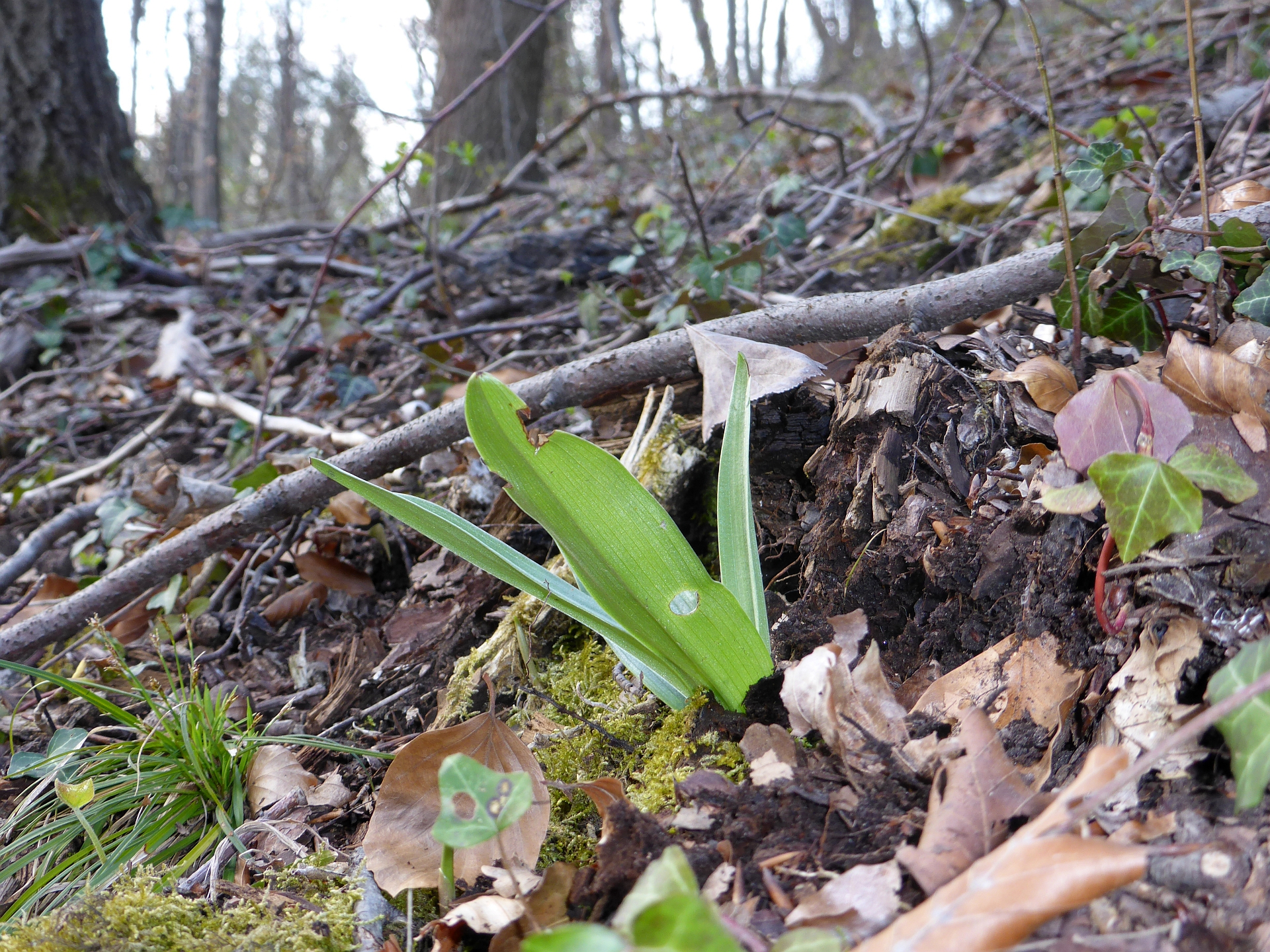
Leaves

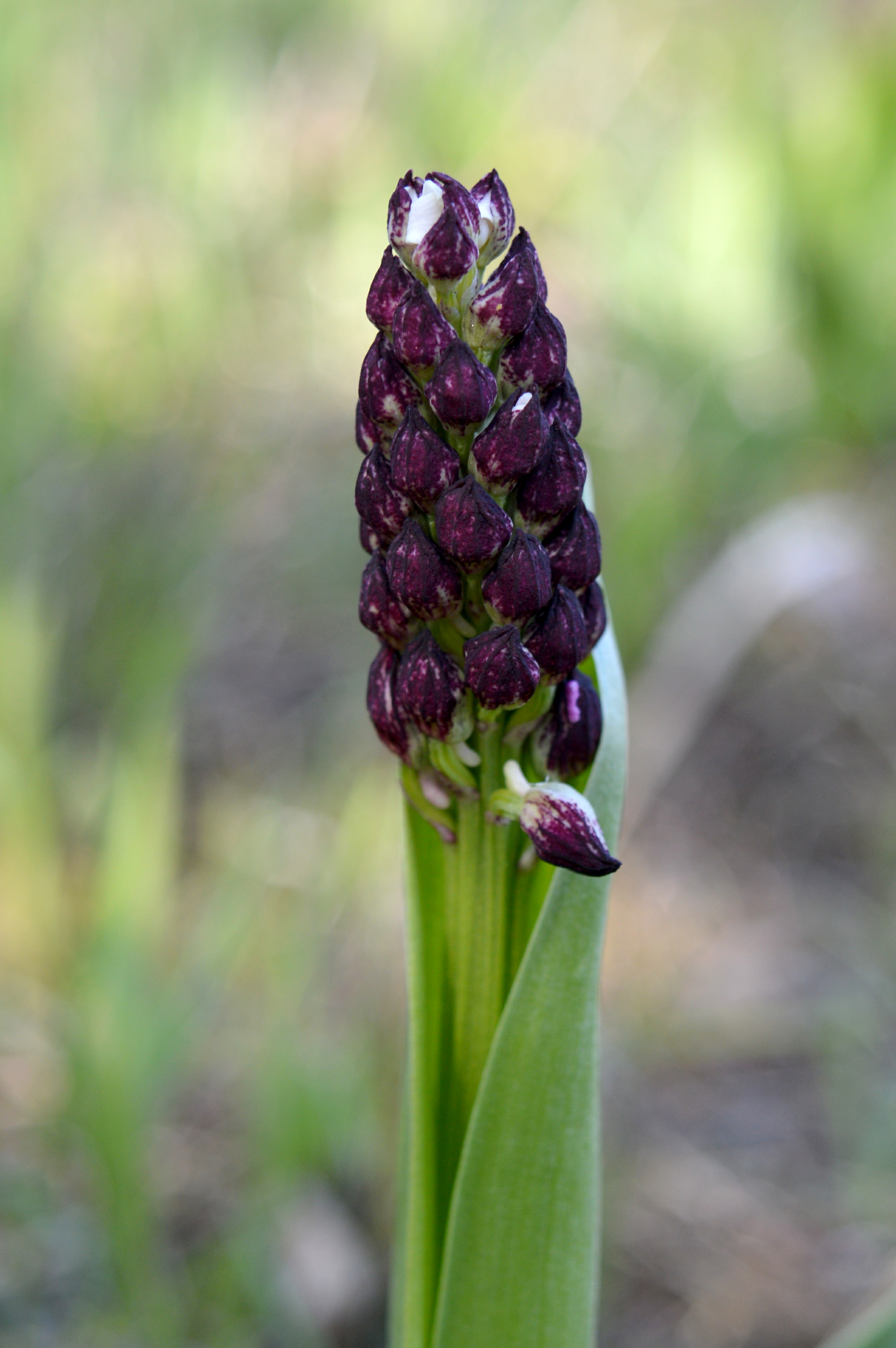
Budding

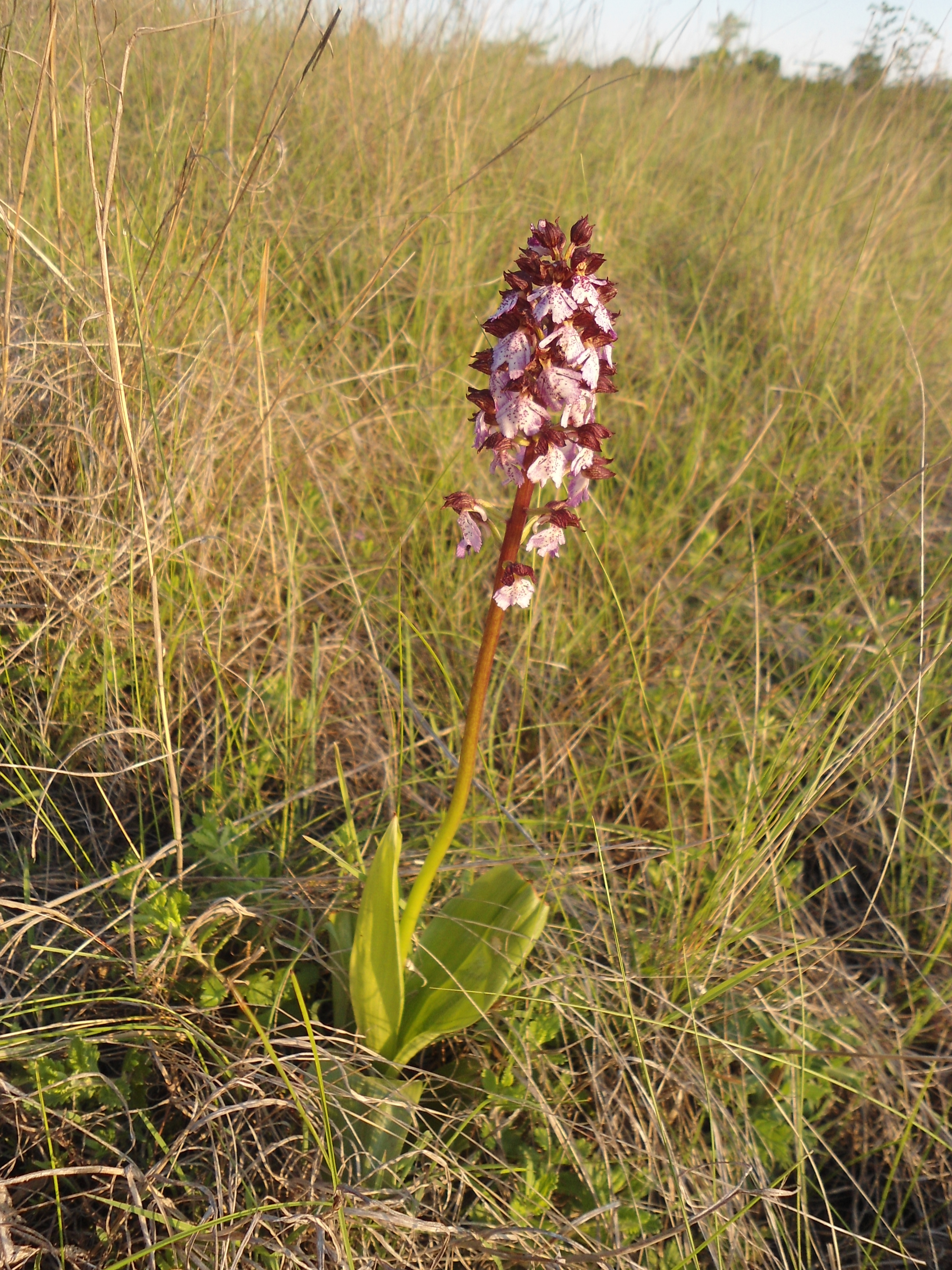
Field habitat

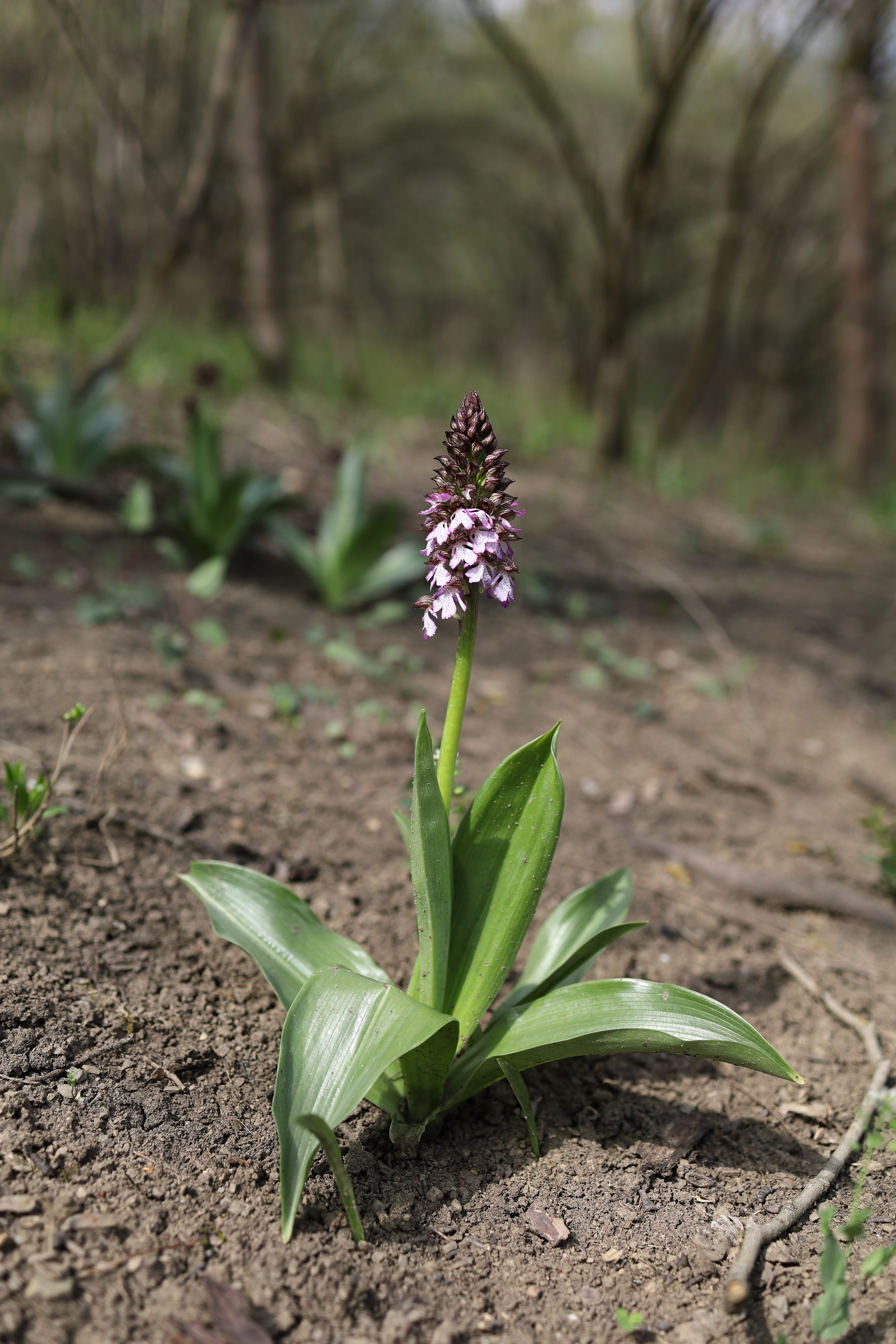
Large individual

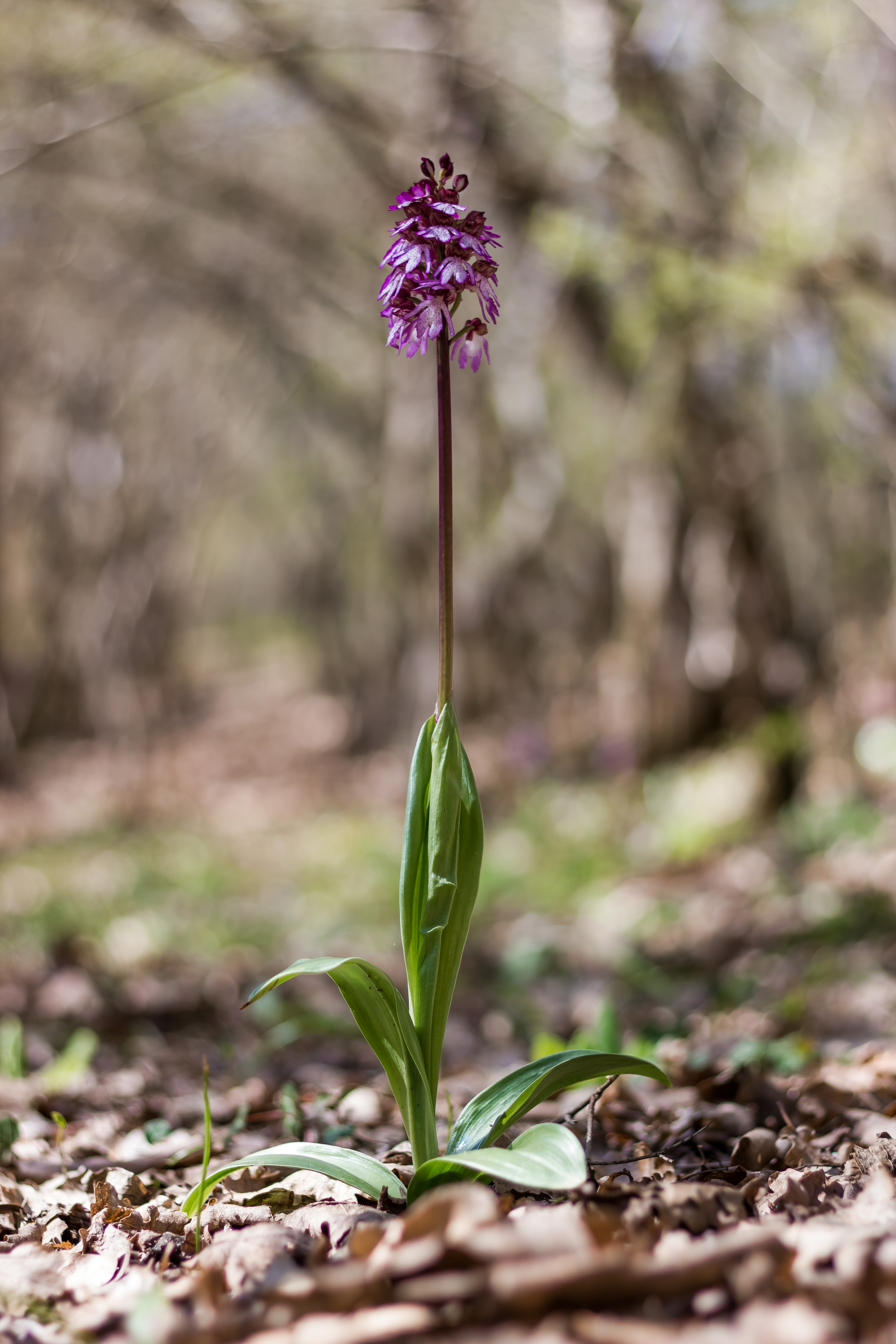
Small individual

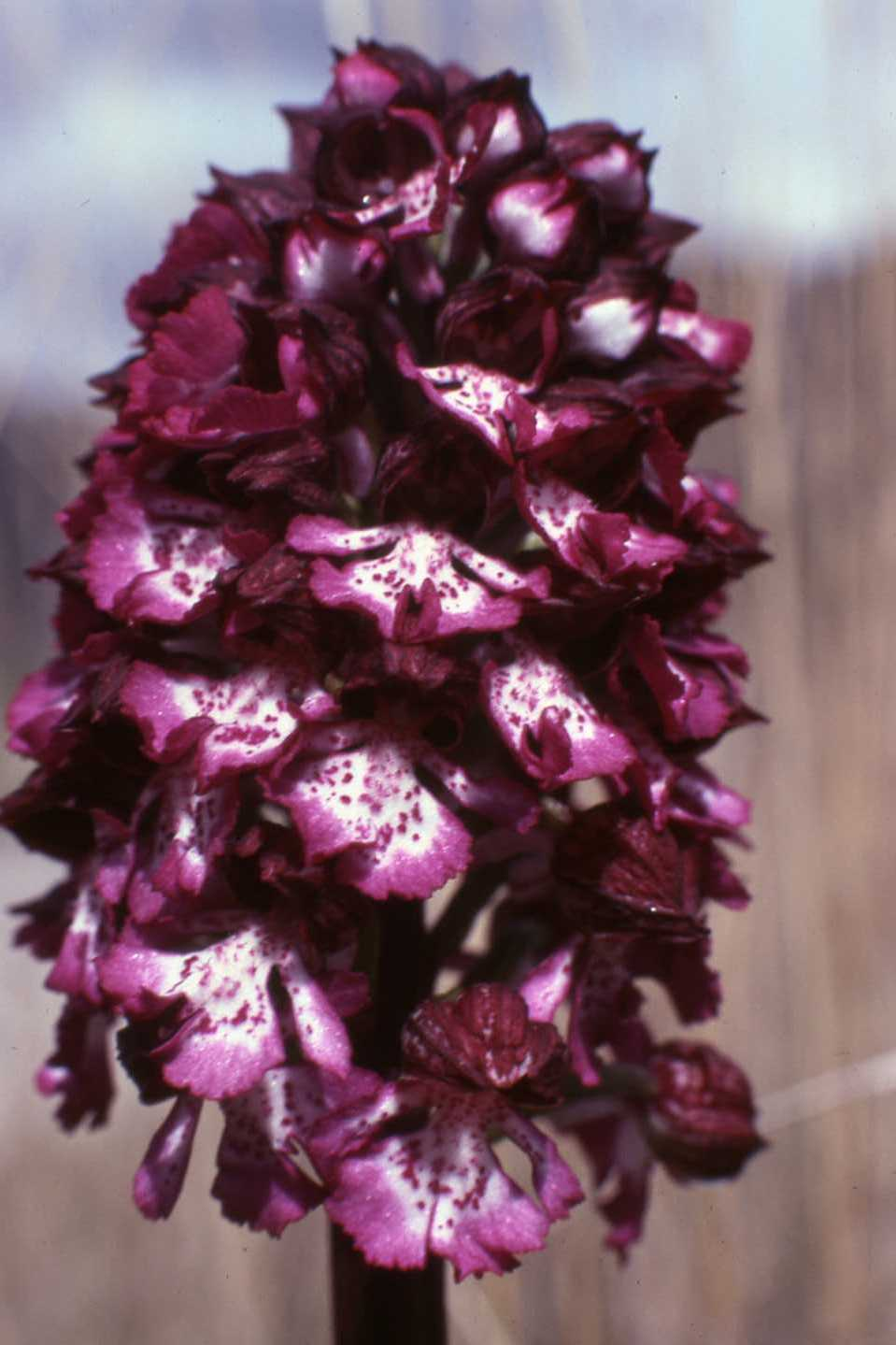
Purple inflorescence

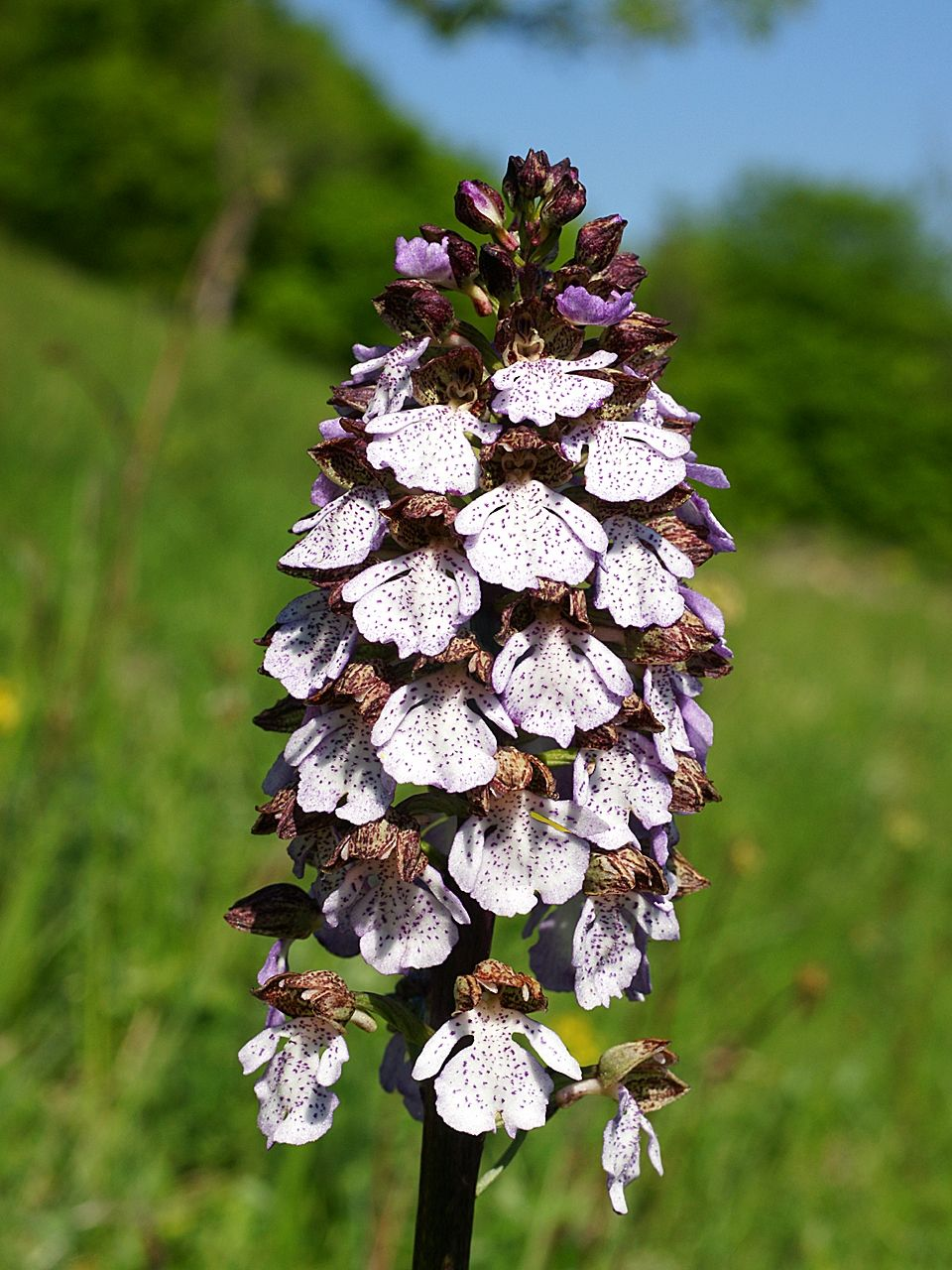
Inflorescence

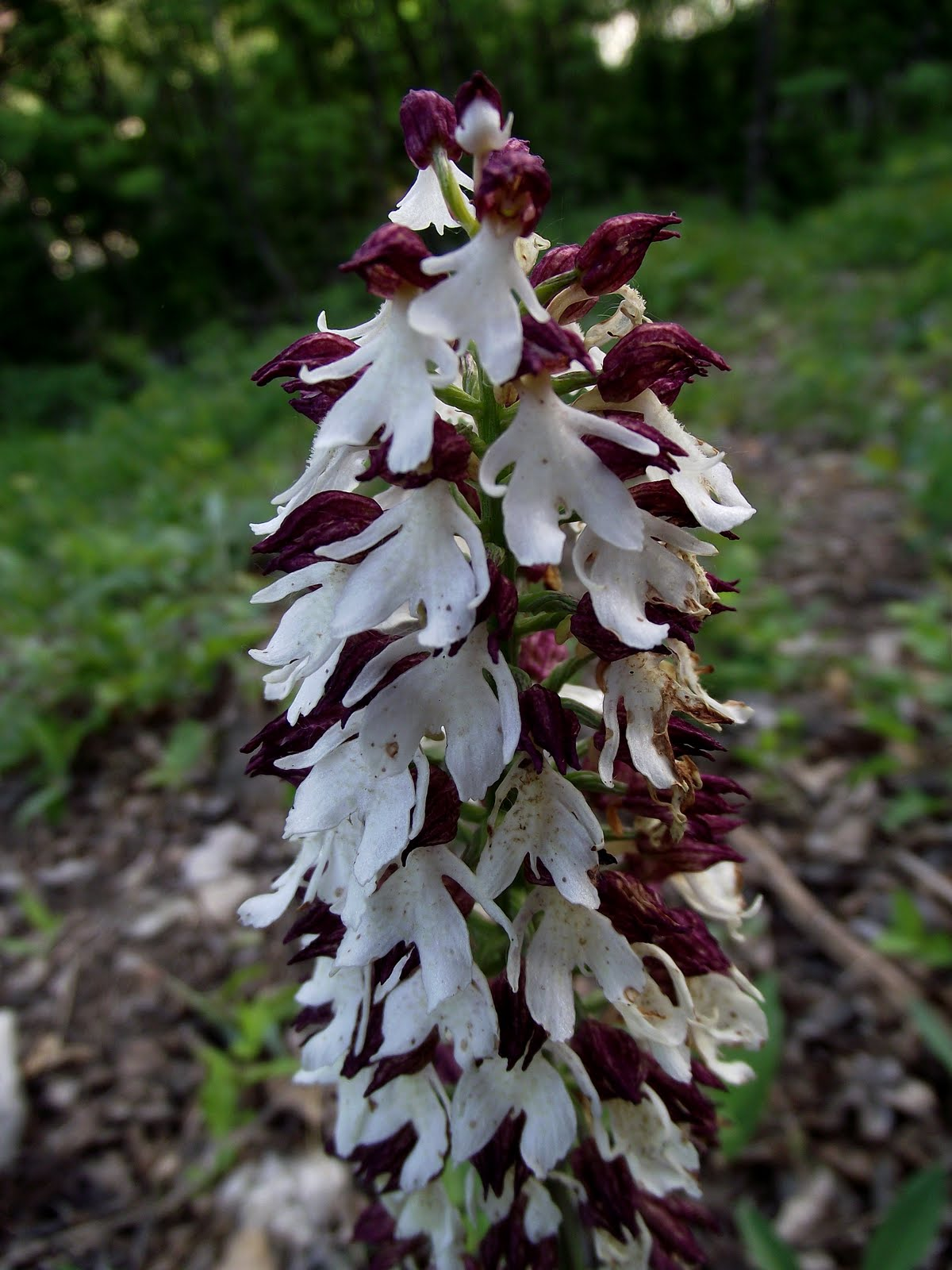
White inflorescence

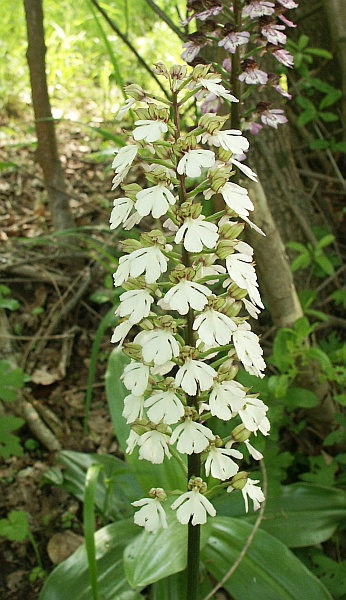
O. p. f. albida

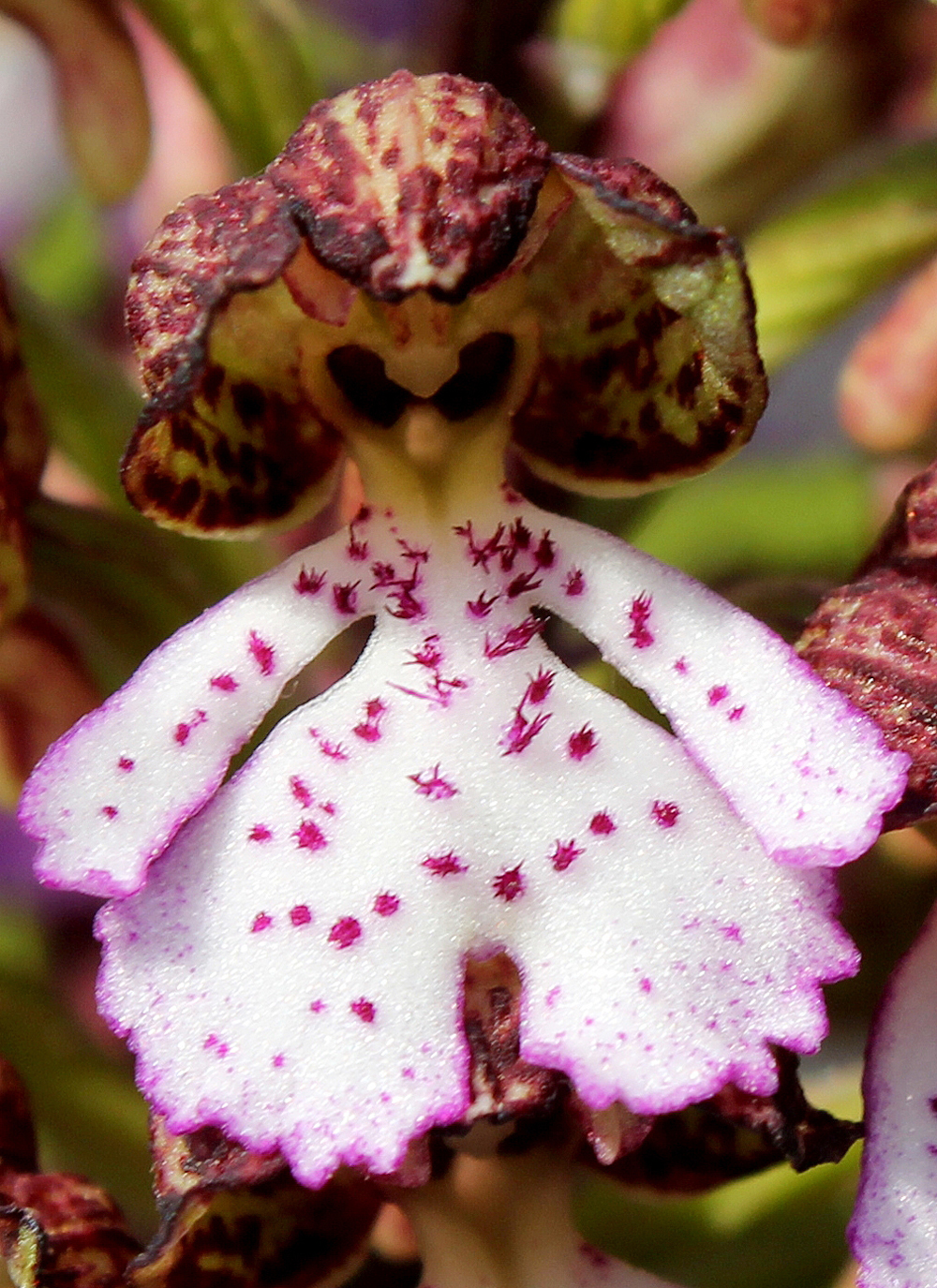
Flower

=== Lookalikes ===
Orchis purpurea may be mistaken for the military orchid (Orchis militaris) or monkey orchid (Orchis simia). The three species often hybridize, making them difficult to identify, although the shape of the labellum is distinct to each species.

Look-a-likes

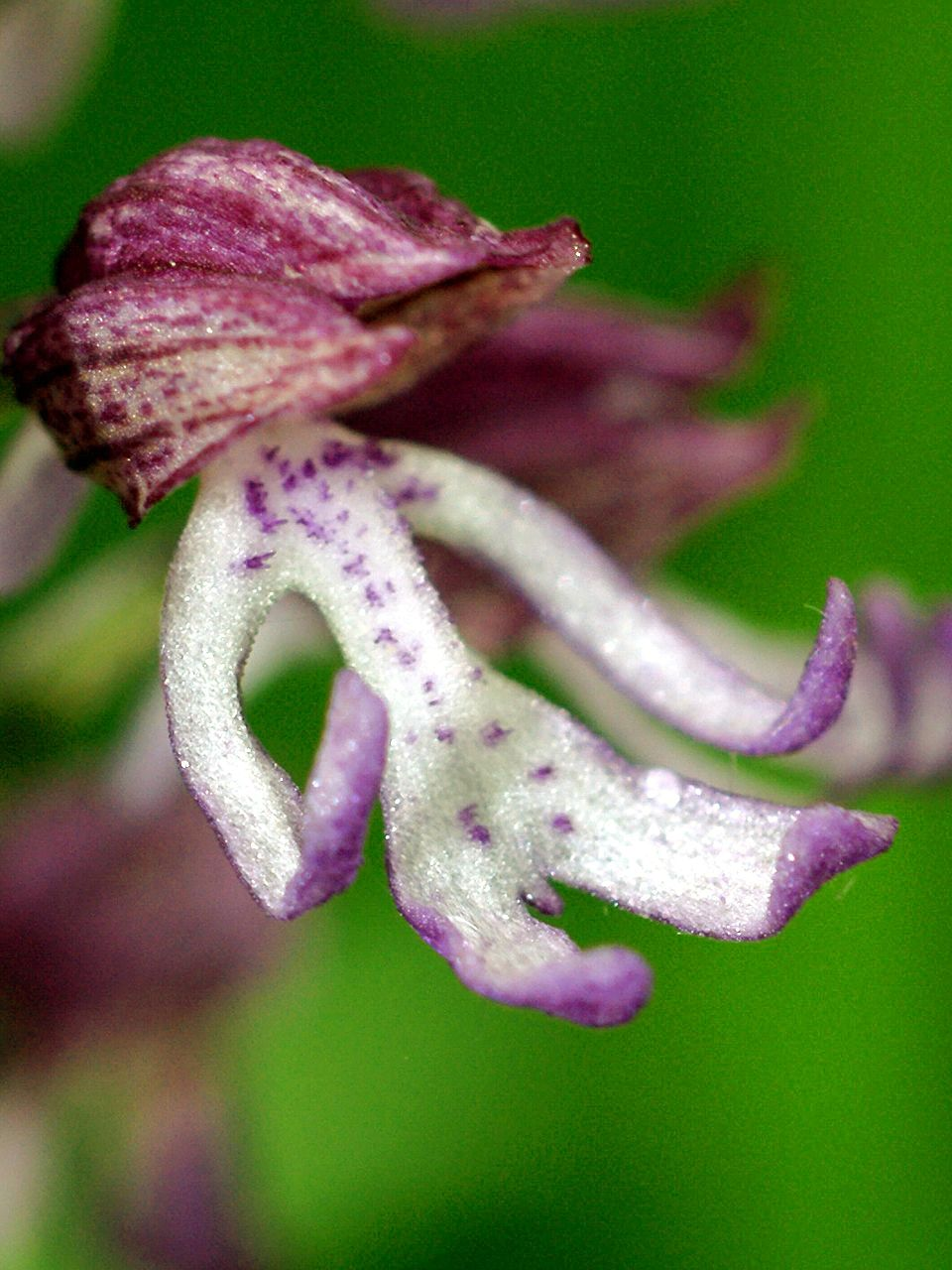
O. × angusticruris (O. purpurea x O. simia)

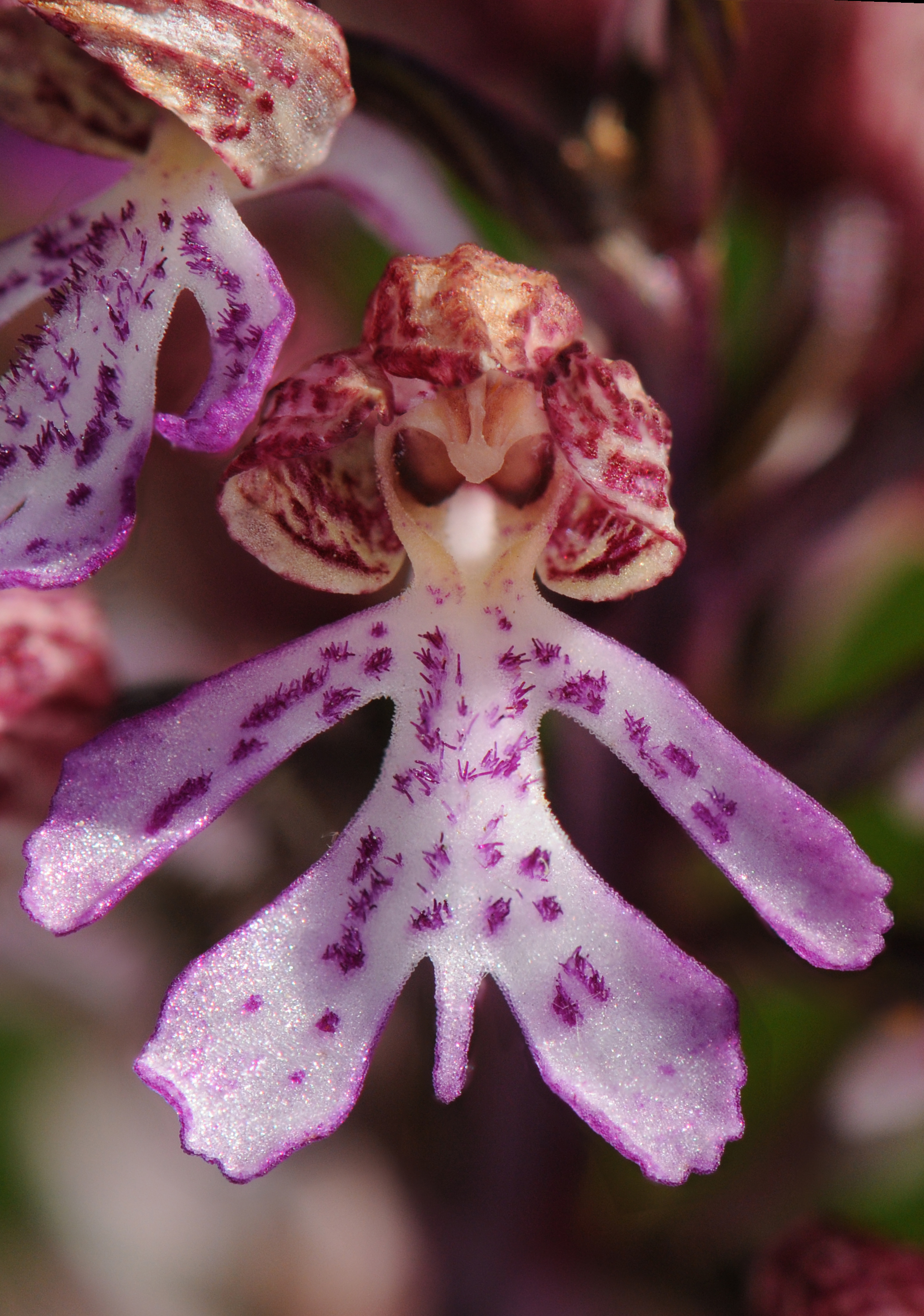
O. × hybrida (O. militaris × O. purpurea)

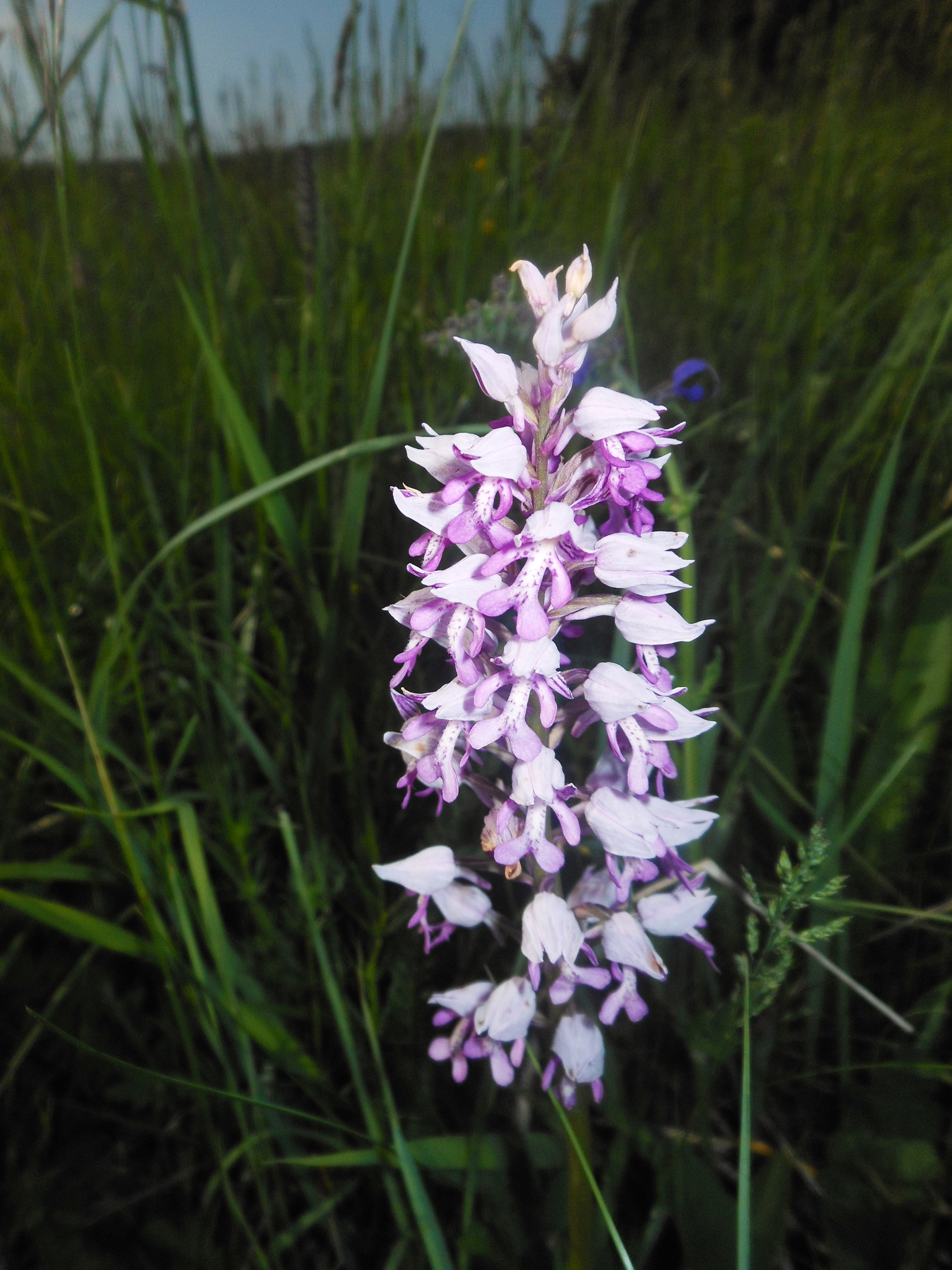
O. militaris

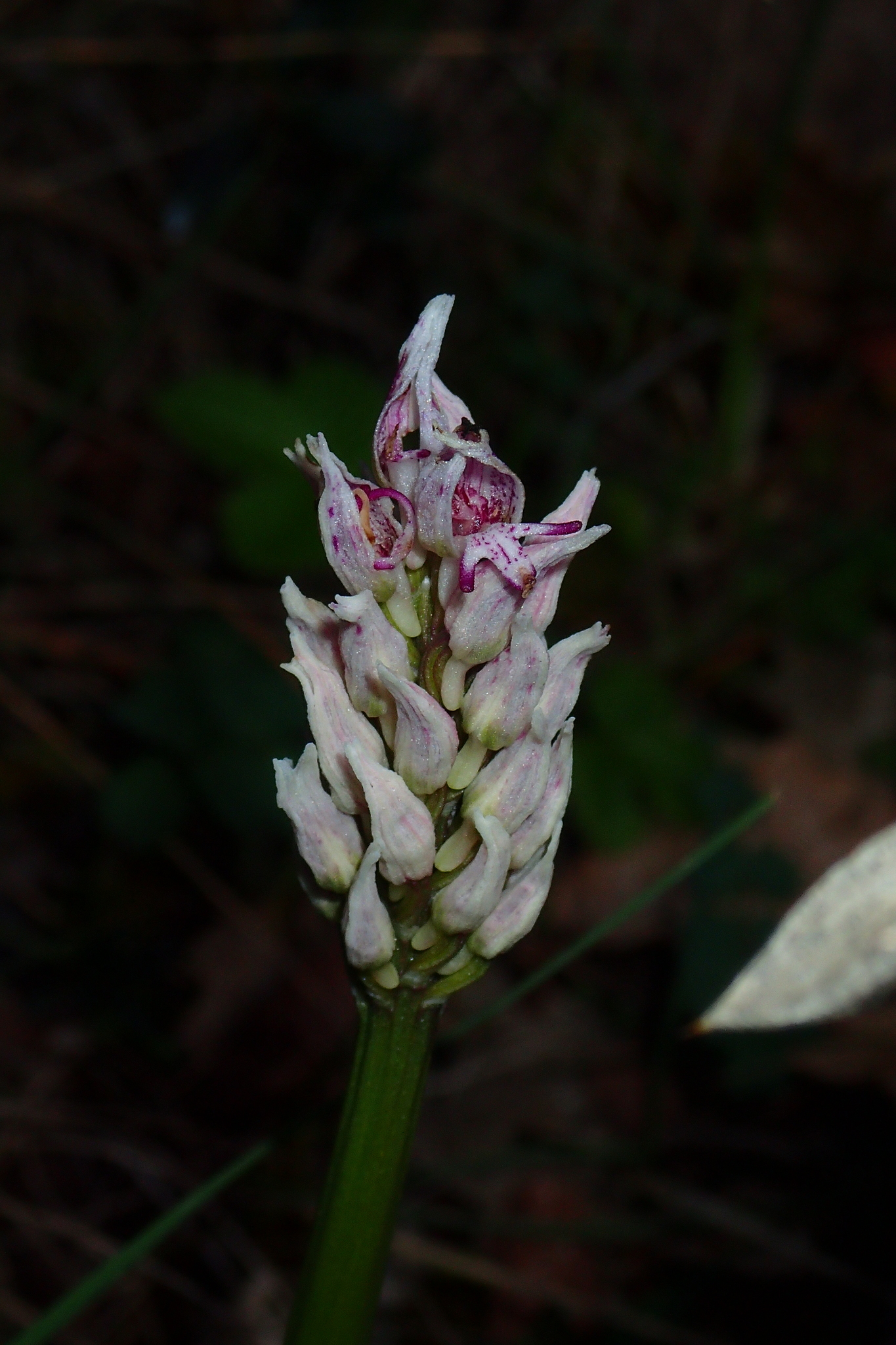
O. simia

== Threats ==
Deer, especially the muntjac, and slugs are among the greatest threats to this orchid. Human activity - woodland clearance, picking flowers or uprooting plants - is a major concern.
