= Cobham Woods =

Woodland in Kent, England

Coordinates: 51.39101°N 0.44056°E

- Site of Special Scientific Interest
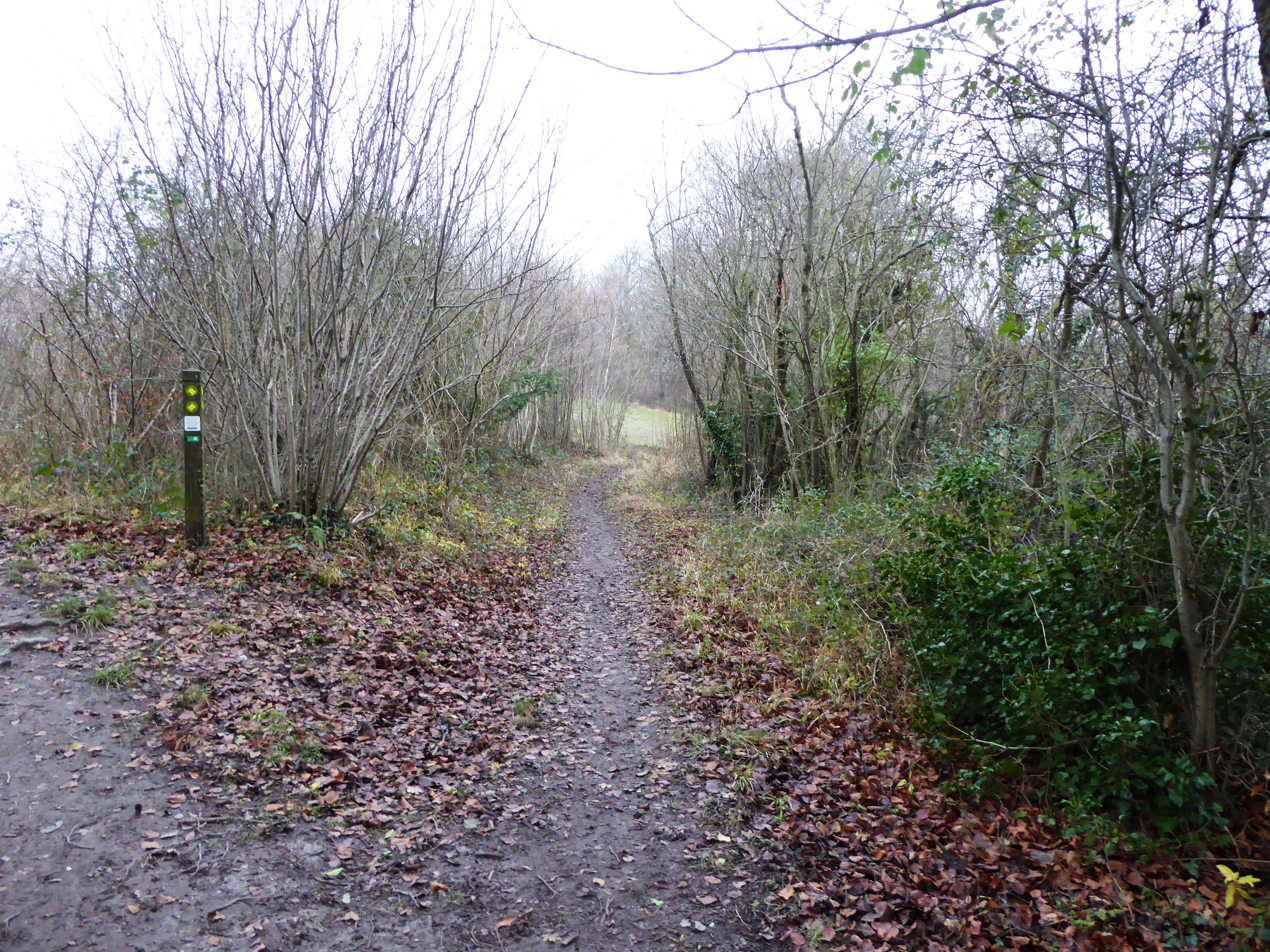
- Footpath junction in Mill Hill, in the south of the woods
- Location of Cobham Woods.
- Area of search: Kent
- Grid reference: TQ 698 683
- Interest: Biological
- Area: 242.7 hectares (600 acres)
- Notification date: 1984
- Location map: Magic Map

Cobham Woods is a 242.7 hectares (600 acres) biological Site of Special Scientific Interest on the western outskirts of Rochester in Kent. It is in the Kent Downs Area of Outstanding Natural Beauty and part of it is managed by the National Trust.

The managed ancient woodland is largely sweet chestnut coppice with some coniferous plantations, while the parkland is mature woodland, with some clearings, of oak, sweet chestnut, beech, hornbeam, and other species. The soils range from acidic Thanet Sands to Upper Cretaceous Chalk. Managed grazing by deer, created woodland pastures devoid of ground shrubs, this has reverted but is being re-established. The arable land, has been a noted spot for botanists since the 1690s, and references to it occur in books on Chalk Grassland.

The woodland was part of the Cobham Hall estate, now ranger managed, and secured to prevent vehicular access. The Darnley Mausoleum, located in the wood, has been rescued and restored, and much of the woodland and the Mausoleum are now in the care of the National Trust. The woods are crossed by public footpaths.
