= Listed buildings in Gravesham district, Kent =

There are about 300 Listed Buildings in the Gravesham district of Kent , which are buildings of architectural or historic interest.

- Grade I buildings are of exceptional interest.
- Grade II* buildings are particularly important buildings of more than special interest.
- Grade II buildings are of special interest.

The lists follow Historic England’s geographical organisation, with entries grouped by county, local authority, and parish (civil and non-civil). The following lists are arranged by parish.

Parish	Listed buildings list	Grade I	Grade II*	Grade II	Total
Cobham	Listed buildings in Cobham	4	3	38	45
Higham	Listed buildings in Higham	2		21	23
Luddesdown	Listed buildings in Luddesdown	1	1	5	7
Meopham	Listed buildings in Meopham	2	2	42	46
Gravesend (non-civil parish)	Listed buildings in Gravesend	1	13	151	165
Shorne	Listed buildings in Shorne		2	22	24
Vigo	no listed buildings				
Total	—	10	21	279	310
