= Dode, Kent =

Coordinates: 51.34817°N 0.39491°E

Dode
- Location within Kent
- OS grid reference: TQ6663
- District: Gravesham
- Shire county: Kent
- Region: South East
- Country: England
- Sovereign state: United Kingdom
- Post town: GRAVESEND
- Postcode district: DA12
- UK Parliament: Gravesham
- Website: http://www.dodevillage.com/

Dode (in Old English, Dowde) was a village in England that was wiped out by the Black Death in 1349. All that remains is the deconsecrated church, which was rebuilt in the 1990s.

== History and location ==
Archaeological evidence shows habitation in the Dode area during the time of the Roman Empire.

The church at Dode was built during the reign of William II of England at some point between 1087 and 1100. It was built on a man-made mound. The nearby hill is known as "Holly Hill" which is a corruption of "Holy Hill", and the lane which leads to the village is "Wrangling Lane", showing that the mound could be the site of a meeting place. The church stands at the end of a 10-mile long easterly running ley line connecting three pre-reformation churches, two Roman sites, a Bronze Age burial ground, and two of the Medway megaliths - the Coffin Stone and Kit's Coty House.

The village of Dode was virtually wiped out by the Black Death during the 14th century, and its church last used as a place of worship in 1367, then deconsecrated on the orders of Thomas Trilleck, the Bishop of Rochester. It was originally twinned with another Early Norman church in Paddlesworth (now in Snodland).

Stones from the church were used to build a Medieval church nearby.

=== Folklore ===
According to local legend, the last survivor of the Black Death at Dode was a seven-year-old girl known as the Dodechild. It is said she took refuge in the church after all the other villagers were dead, and died within its walls. The Dodechild is supposed to haunt the churchyard, having first appeared on a Sunday morning each month for several years, and then every seven years.

== Rebuilding of the church ==
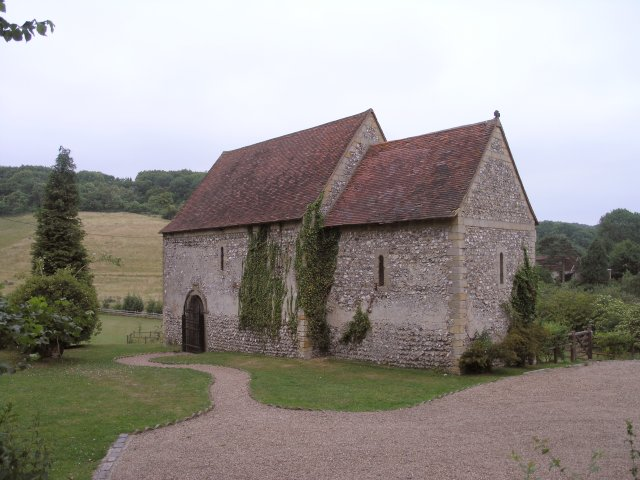
The rebuilt Church at Dode.

Following the Black Death, the village was abandoned, and the church stood empty for centuries. In 1901 it was purchased by an antiquarian, George Matthews Arnold, Mayor of Gravesend. He restored the walls and roof of the church and in 1954 the Arnold family returned the building to the Catholic Church. It was rededicated as the Church of Our Lady of the Meadows and mass was celebrated there at least once a year.

Eventually the building deteriorated again and was vandalised. In 1990 Doug Chapman, a chartered surveyor who had worked at Canterbury Cathedral, purchased the church and began restoring the building, originally with the intention of turning it into a weekend home. Since 1999 it has been licensed as a civil wedding venue.

The wedding venue hit the British press in December 2009 because of the snowfall which occurred across the country. A bride-to-be called BBC Radio Kent for assistance when she realised that the transport arranged for her wedding would not be able to travel down the narrow lane to Dode. A number of volunteers stepped forward, providing enough four-wheel drive cars to transport the wedding party and their guests both to the venue at Dode, and then afterwards to the Leather Bottle pub in Cobham.

== See also ==
- Luddesdown
- Meopham
- Snodland

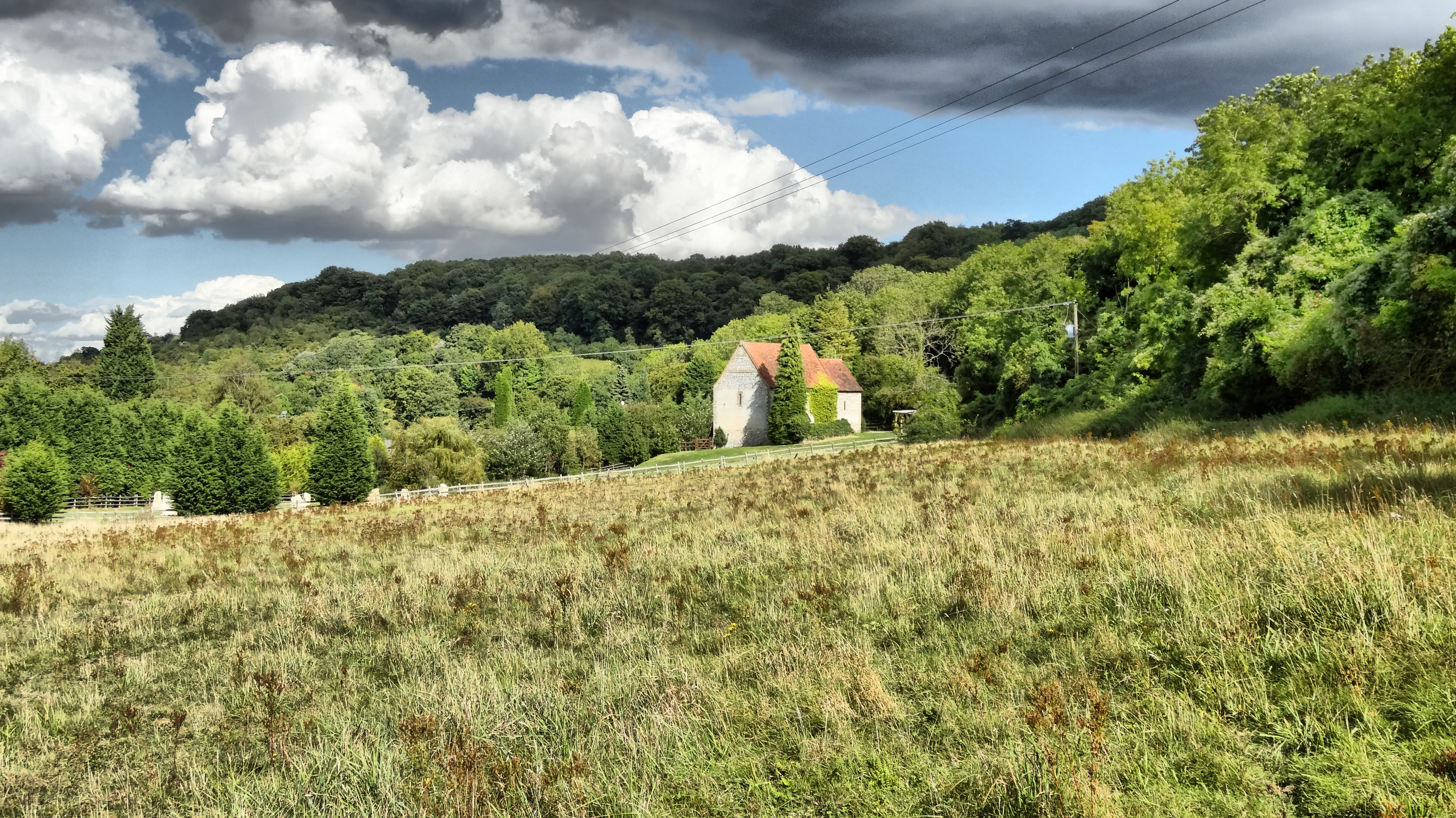
Dode Church

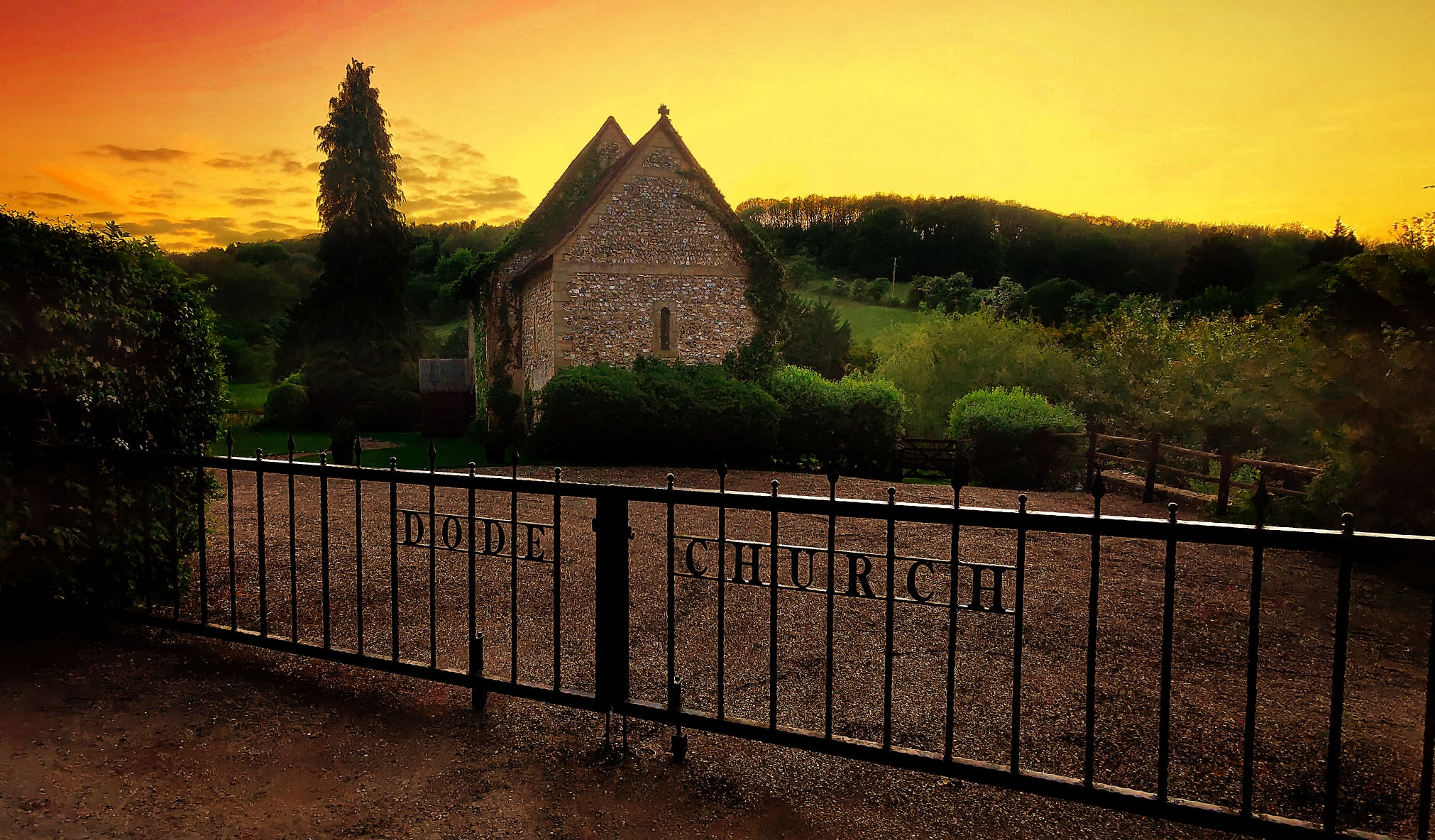
Dode Church
