= Robert Speechly =

Robert Kelfull Speechly (17 September 1840 – 17 September 1884) was a 19th-century British architect.

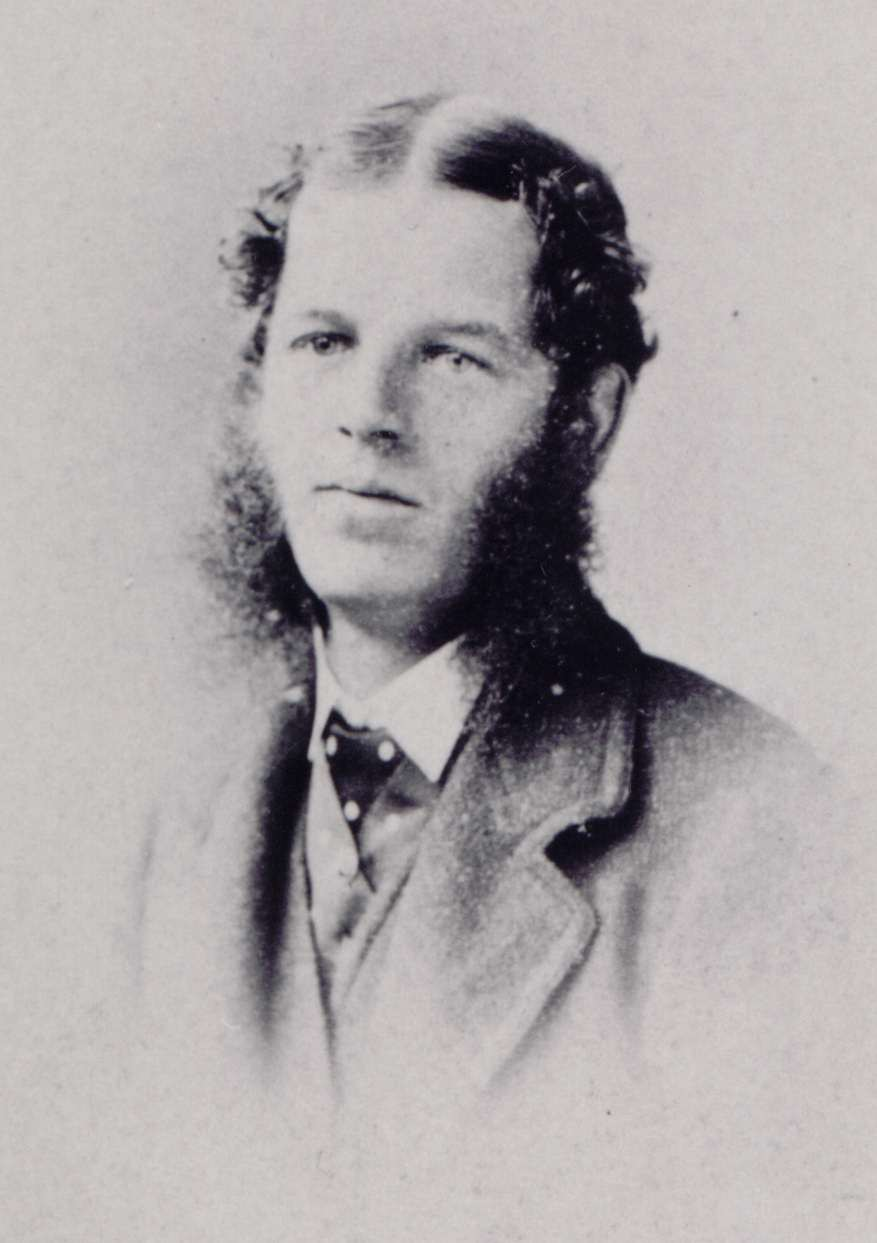
Robert Speechly (1840–1884)

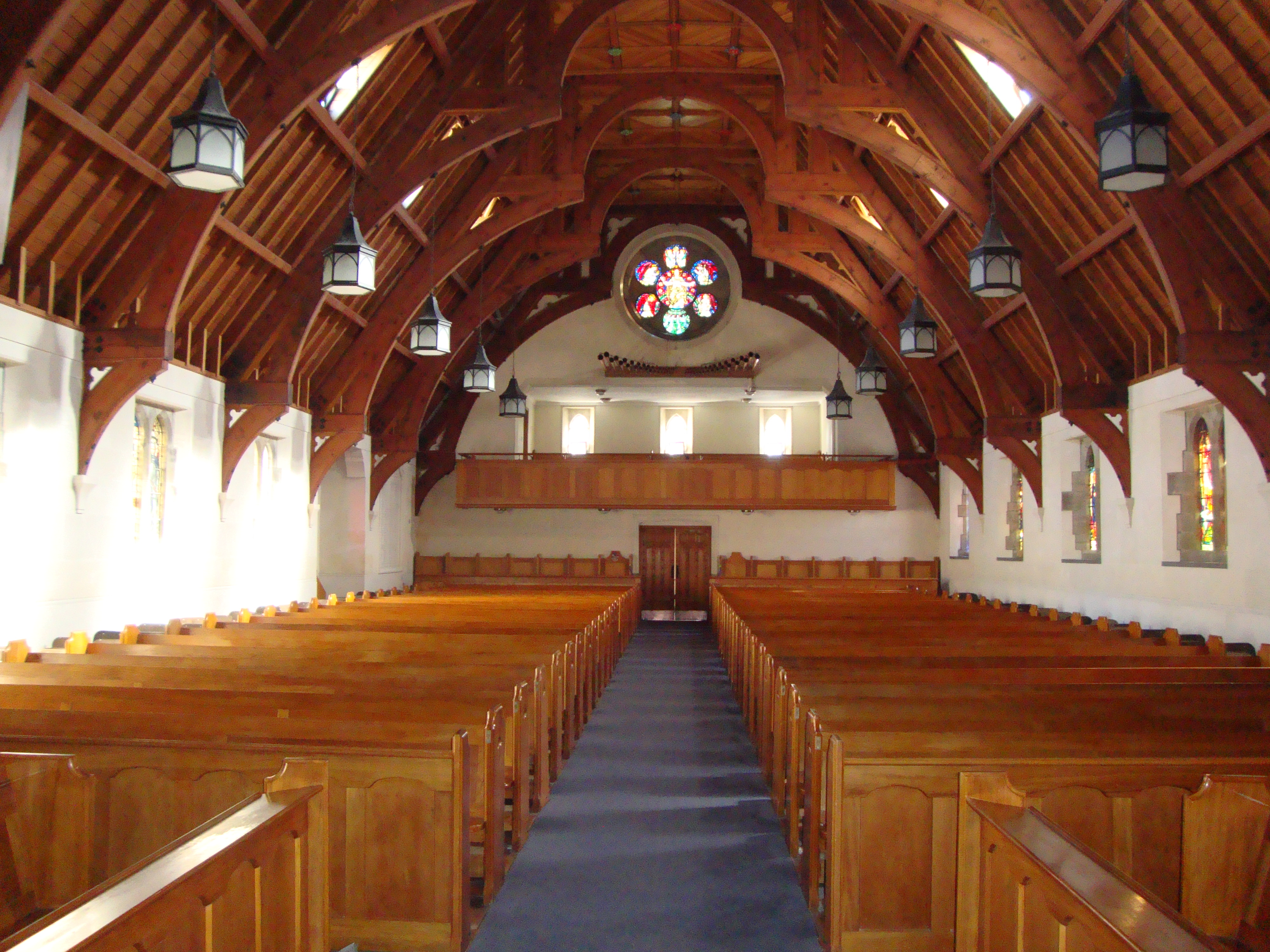
Christ's College Chapel interior

== Life and work ==
Speechly was born in 1840 in Whittlesey, Cambridgeshire, the son of Thomas Kelfull Speechly and Sarah, née Bellars, and a younger brother of John Speechly, later Bishop of Travancore and Cochin. He was educated at Oundle School and, from 1855 to 1860, articled to Henry Dawson of London. His drawings from 1857 suggest that he toured Italy during this period. Early work included supervising installation of stained glass windows to the memory of Sir Harry Smith at St Mary's Church, Whittlesey in December 1862, design of the porch of St Mary's Church, Higham, Kent in 1863 and as William Slater's assistant on reconstruction of the central tower of Chichester Cathedral. He became a Member of the Royal Institute of British Architects in 1864.

Speechly was sent to Christchurch, New Zealand in 1864 by Sir George Gilbert Scott as resident architect to supervise the building of the new ChristChurch Cathedral. The Cathedral Commission's decision not to accept Scott's advice and appoint Speechly, rather than the leading local architect, Benjamin Mountfort (1825–1898), led to an intense debate in the Christchurch newspapers. When lack of money halted construction of the cathedral in late 1865, Speechly completed his four-year contract in New Zealand as architect to the Anglican Church Property Trustees, supervising all buildings undertaken by them. He was involved in the design of a number of churches, houses and schools in the Canterbury settlement, assisted by his pupil, and then partner, William Fitzjohn Crisp. These included Christ's College Chapel (1867), St Mary's Church, Merivale (1866), St Mary's Church, Addington (1867), St John's Parsonage (1866) and St Luke's Vicarage (1867–1868).

Speechly left New Zealand for Melbourne, Australia in 1868, where he entered into partnership with the diocesan architect, Lionel Terry. Their designs for cathedrals for Melbourne and Newcastle, New South Wales, were initially accepted but later set aside.

Speechly returned to England in 1869, where he was one of a team of architects employed by Alfred Waterhouse on the rebuilding of Eaton Hall, Cheshire.

He died in London in 1884.
