= St Mary's Church, Higham =

Coordinates: 51.4409°N 0.4683°E

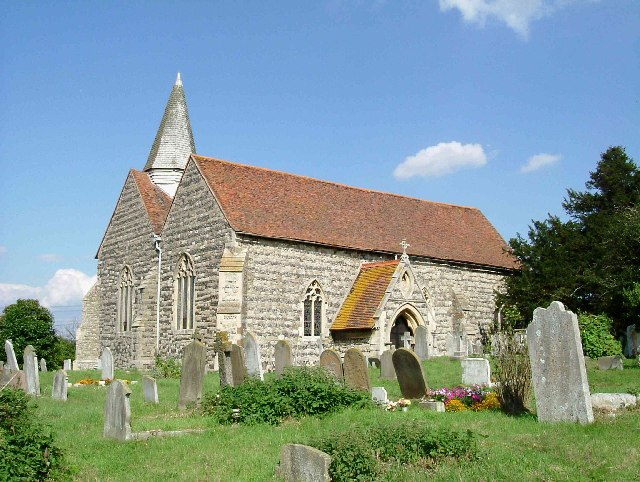
- St Mary's Church, Higham, from the southwest

- Location in Kent
- OS grid reference: TQ 716 742
- Location: Higham, Kent
- Country: England
- Denomination: Anglican
- Website: Churches Conservation Trust

Architecture
- Functional status: Redundant
- Heritage designation: Grade I
- Designated: 21 November 1966
- Architectural type: Church
- Style: Norman, Gothic, Gothic Revival

Specifications
- Materials: Flint and ragstone Tiled roofs

St Mary's Church is a redundant Anglican church in the village of Higham, Kent, England. It is recorded in the National Heritage List for England as a designated Grade I listed building, and is under the care of the Churches Conservation Trust. The church stands at the north of Lower Higham, in the hamlet of Church Street, some 4 miles (6 km) northwest of Rochester.

== Early history ==
St Mary's was founded in the Saxon era, and a church was in existence on the site before the Norman Conquest. The present church was rebuilt after the Conquest, and still contains some Norman features, despite later additions and alterations. During the 12th century a nunnery was founded nearby, and in about 1280 it moved to a site opposite the church. In 1357 the nunnery received a papal indulgence to raise money for repairs. It is thought likely that this was used to build a new south aisle for the church, which is as large as the original nave. The nunnery was closed in 1522. In 1710 the spire was built. The church was repaired and restored in the early part of the 19th century. The south porch was built during the 19th century.

Charles Dickens' daughter Kate was married in the church in 1860. In 1863 it was restored by an architect named Speechly, and new furniture was installed. The windows were replaced "copying what was there before". However, by the mid 19th century the centre of Higham's population had moved away from the area of St Mary's, and a new church, dedicated to St John, was built 1.8 miles (3 km) further south on the main road in 1862.

== Architecture ==
=== Exterior ===
The church is constructed in a mixture of flint and ragstone, the flint being arranged to give the appearance of horizontal stripes. A buttress at the southeast corner includes some galletting (where slivers of flint have been pushed into the mortar), and other buttresses have tiles inserted between the stones. The roof is tiled, and the spire is shingled. The plan of the church consists of a nave and a south aisle of almost equal size. At the east end of the nave is the Lady Chapel, which had been the chancel of the original church. The present chancel is at the east end of the south aisle. The nave also contains two small rooms, the larger one acting as the vestry, the other being entered only from the outside of the church. The north wall contains Norman features, a blocked window and the outline of a doorway.

=== Interior ===
The church is entered by the 15th century south door which is finely carved with motifs including roses, lilies and human faces. Between the nave and the aisle is a three-bay arcade. Dividing the nave from the Lady Chapel is a wooden 15th century rood screen. This is carved and has five arches, the central one forming the doorway. Between the arches are columns, each of which is surmounted by a small spire. The carved wooden pulpit dates from the same era. The font is Norman, and the rest of the furniture dates from the 1863 restoration. The Lady Chapel contains two tombs, one of which is dated 1615, and an aumbry complete with its door. In the south wall of the chancel is a piscina and a medieval tomb. On the wall on each side of the altar are panels inscribed with the Ten Commandments, the Lord's Prayer, and the Creed. The stained glass dates from the 19th and 20th centuries.

== Recent history and present day ==
Further repairs were carried out to the roof and spire of St Mary's during the 20th century. After the church was declared redundant, it was vested in the Redundant Churches Fund, the forerunner of the Churches Conservation Trust, in 1987. In the same year St Mary's was replaced as the parish church by St John's Church. The south porch was built during the 19th century. During the 21st century, further repairs to the stonework of the south aisle, porch and east end have been organised by the Trust. In the wall of the south aisle, the external flintwork has become separated from the core of the wall, and work has been undertaken to pin the two together. In early 2009 a group known as The Friends of St. Mary's Church was founded to work with the Trust, to raise money for the church, and to organise events.

== See also ==
- List of churches preserved by the Churches Conservation Trust in South East England
