= Christ's College Chapel =

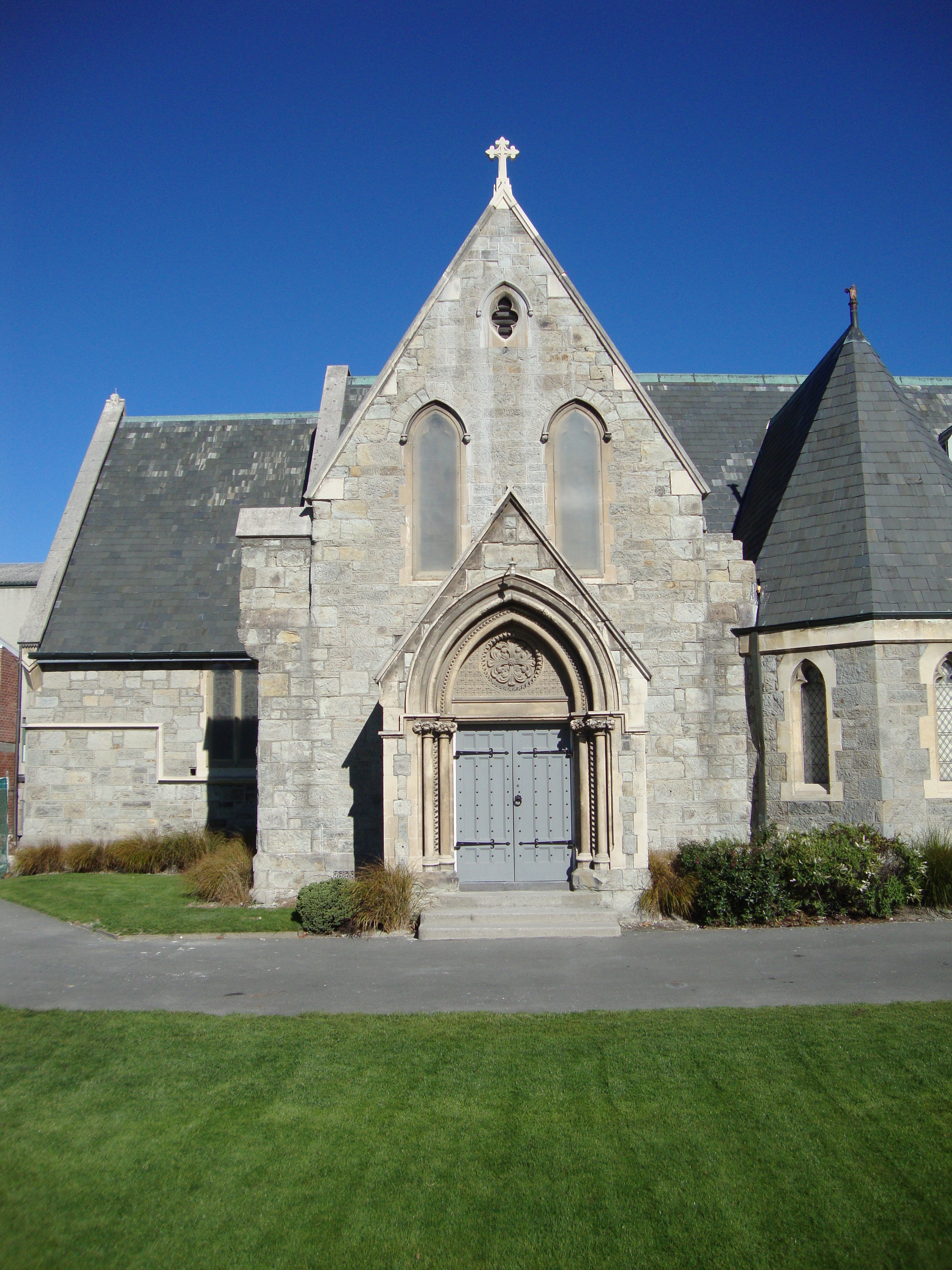
- Christ's College Chapel in April 2011
- Christ's College Chapel
- 43.5305°S 172.6265°E
- Location: Christchurch Central City
- Country: New Zealand
- Denomination: Anglican

Architecture
- Functional status: School chapel
- Heritage designation: Category I
- Designated: 27 June 1985
- Architect(s): Robert Speechly (1867); Benjamin Mountfort (1880s extensions); Paul Pascoe (1955 extension)
- Style: Gothic Revival
- Completed: 1867

Heritage New Zealand – Category 1
- Designated: 27 June 1985
- Reference no.: 3277

Christ's College Chapel is part of Christ's College, Christchurch.

== Description ==
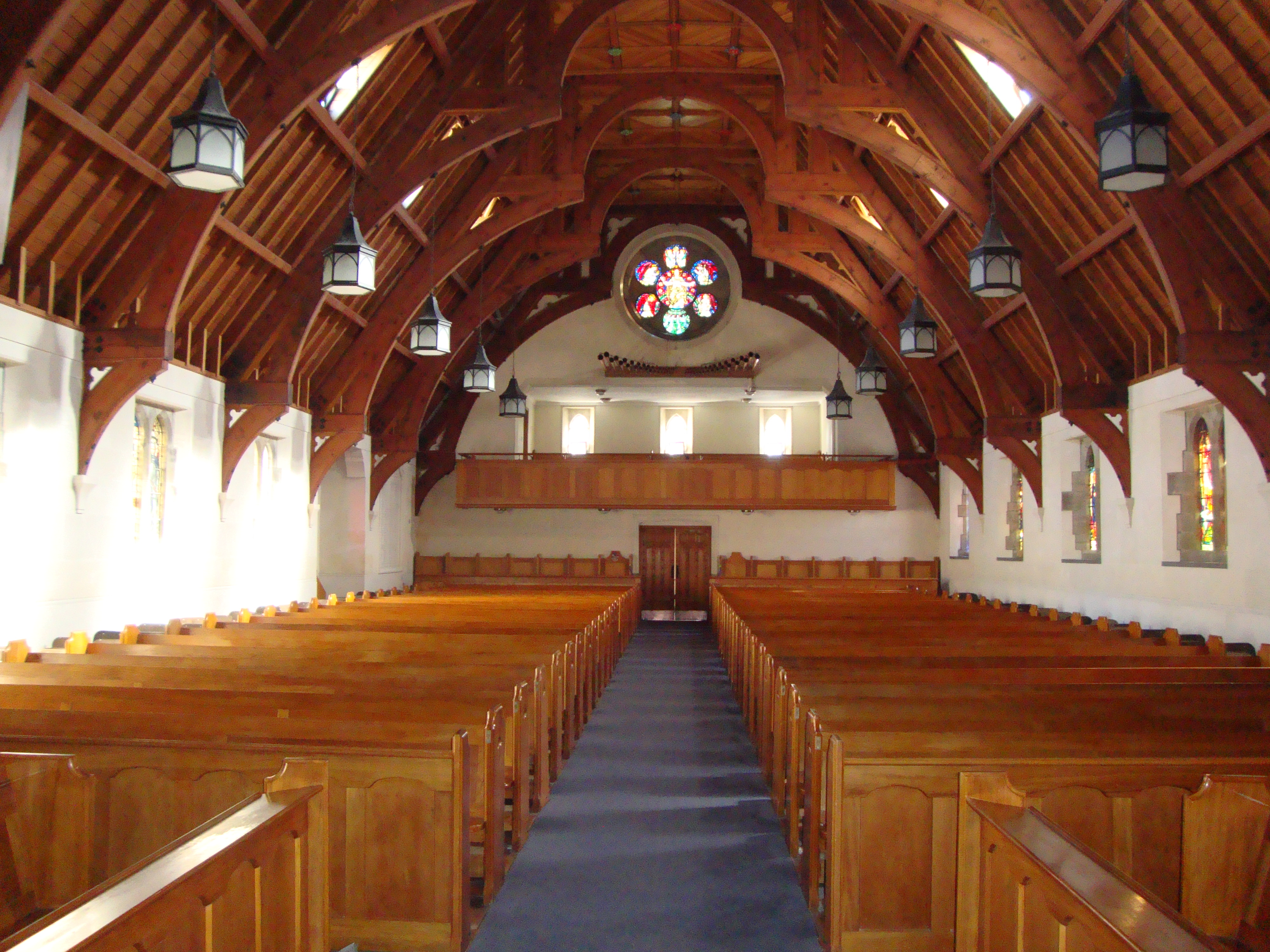
Interior of Christ's College Chapel

The chapel was designed by Robert Speechly and was built in 1867. Its simple style was in harmony with Christ's College Big School, which is four years older. The chapel was extended in 1884 to a design by Benjamin Mountfort, who added transepts and a chancel; an earlier design by William Armson was rejected. In 1888, a Mountfort-designed organ chamber was added.

The chapel more than doubled in size in 1955 based on a design by Paul Pascoe, who did not interfere with the Gothic Revival appearance of the school's quadrangle.

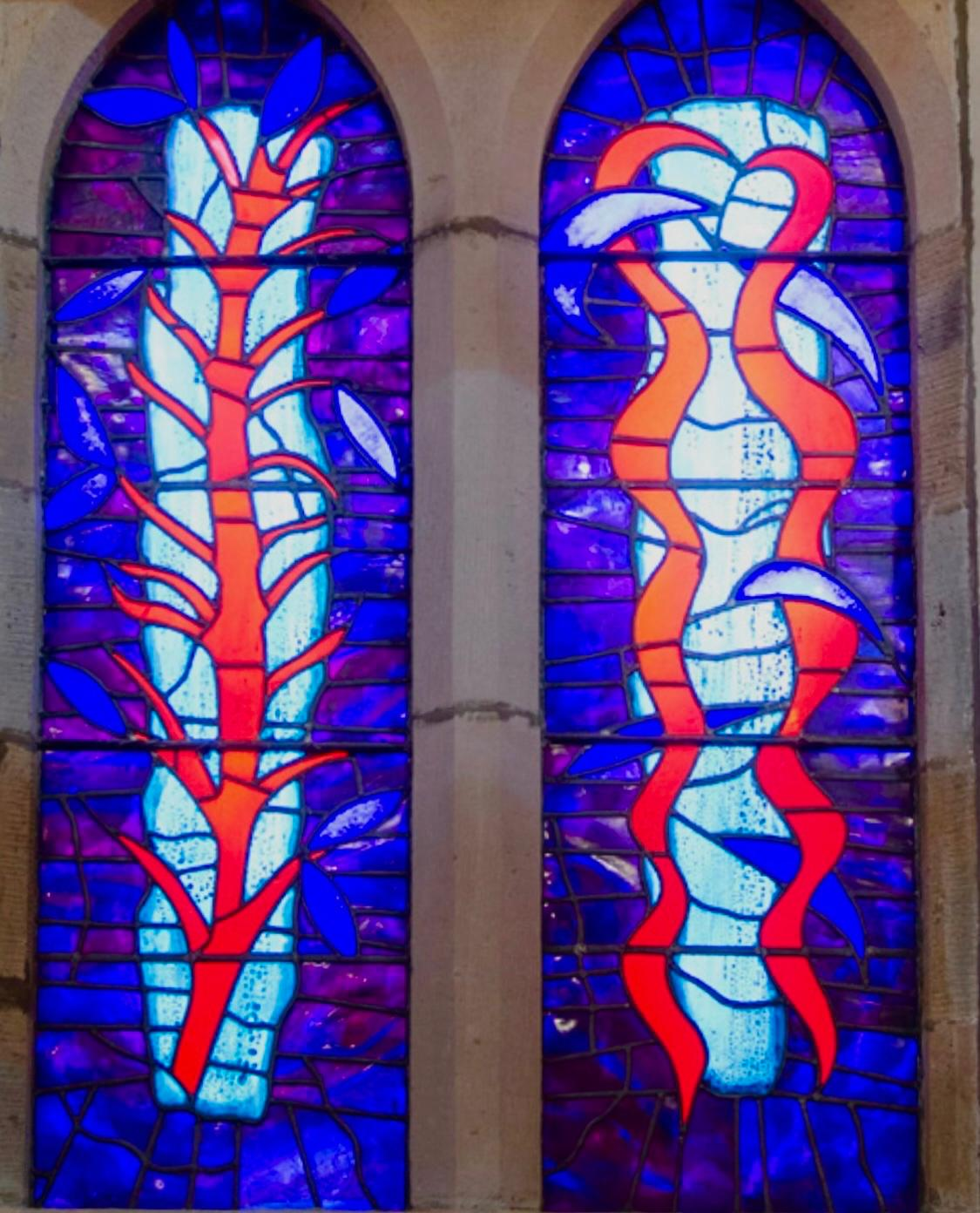
Window by John Piper

A two-light window designed by English artist John Piper and manufactured by Patrick Reyntiens commemorates Ernest Courtenay Crosse, former Chaplain and Headmaster of Christ's College, donated by his widow Mrs Joyce Cross. It was installed in 1968. Piper's only work in New Zealand, it depicts the Tree of Life in the left light and the River of Life on the right, both shown in semi-abstract forms of red and light blue set against a turquoise and purple background. Damaged in the 2010 Canterbury earthquake, the window was repaired and reinstalled in 2018.

The chapel was used for the funeral service for Christchurch architect Peter Beaven in June 2012.

The chapel was registered as a heritage building by the New Zealand Historic Places Trust on 27 June 1985 with registration number 3277 classified as A. With the change of the classification system, the building later became a Category I listing.

== See also ==
- List of oldest buildings in Christchurch
- List of historic places in Christchurch
