= Paul Pascoe =

New Zealand architect (1908–1976)

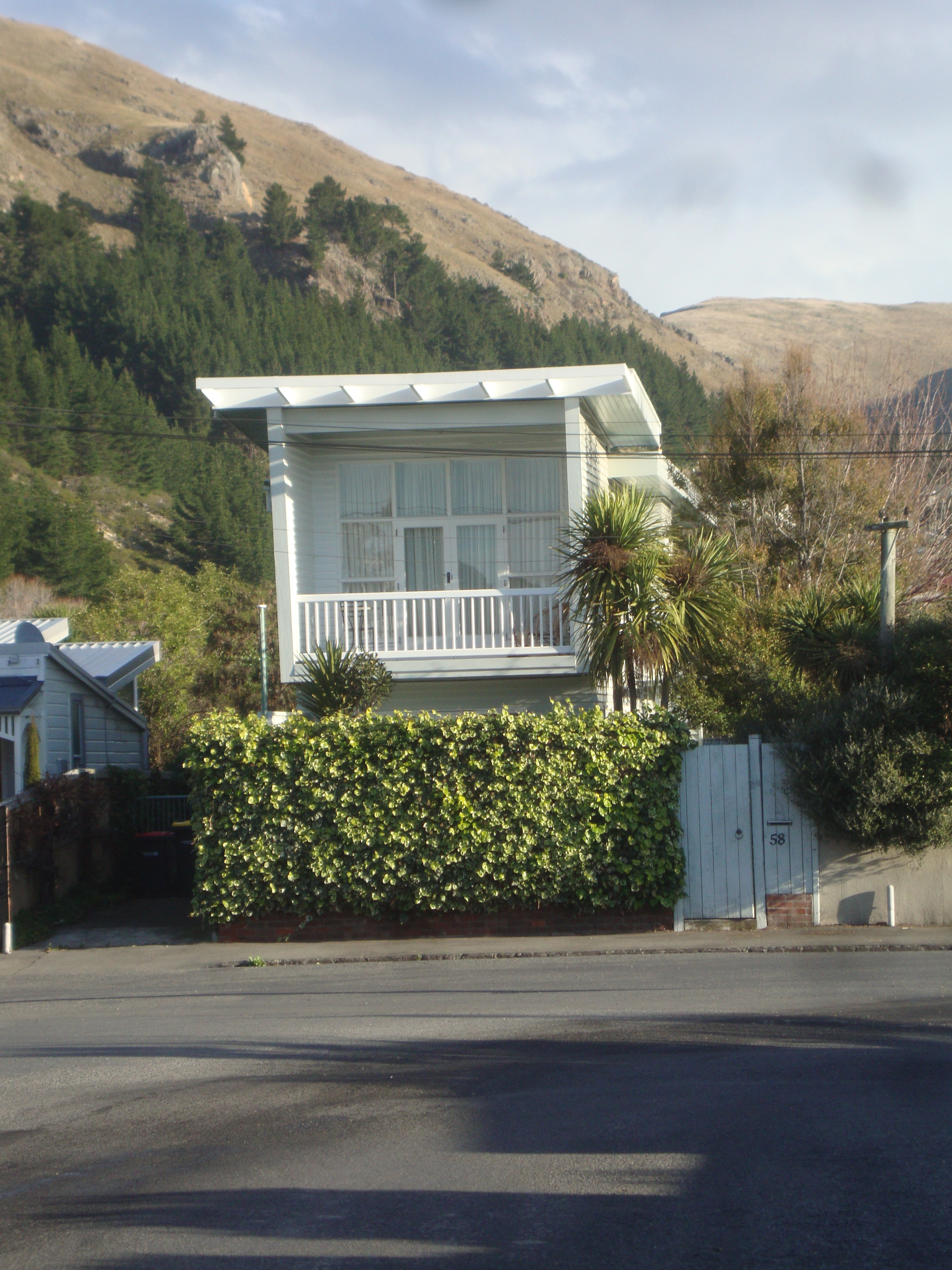
- Pascoe House in the Christchurch suburb of Sumner
- Born: Arnold Paul Pascoe; 26 September 1908; Christchurch, New Zealand
- Died: 11 September 1976 (aged 67); Springfield, New Zealand
- Occupation: Architect
- Relatives: John Pascoe (twin brother)

Arnold Paul Pascoe (26 September 1908 – 11 September 1976) was a New Zealand architect. He was born in Christchurch, New Zealand in 1908; John was his twin brother. He designed airport terminal buildings for Christchurch International Airport (late 1950s), Wellington International Airport (late 1960s), and Rarotonga International Airport (early 1970s).

He commenced architectural training and worked under Cecil Wood. In England, he worked for Brian O'Rorke and the Tecton Group. After returning to Christchurch, he went into partnership with Wood for just over a year but worked on his own from 1938. In 1945, he was joined by Humphrey Hall, and over the next ten years, Pascoe & Hall designed hundreds of domestic and commercial buildings and became one of New Zealand's most prominent practices. Shortly after leaving the partnership in 1955, Pascoe won the commission to design the new terminal building for Christchurch Airport.

By August 1955, Pascoe had developed sketch plans for a 3,720 square metres (40,000 sq ft) terminal building. By October, the design work was "well advanced". From December 1955 to March 1956, Pascoe went on a study tour and amongst other things, he studied airport buildings in Singapore (Paya Lebar Air Base), Zurich (Zürich Airport), Amsterdam (Amsterdam Airport Schiphol), Copenhagen (Copenhagen Airport), three terminals in the UK, and sixteen terminals in the USA. Upon his return, he reported on the need to significantly increase the size of the terminal based on what he had learned, but there were also some additional requests by the airport administration. The airport terminal was built by Fletcher Construction from late 1957, and it was opened on 10 June 1959.

Two of Pascoe's designs are listed with the New Zealand Historic Places Trust. One is the 1948 Pascoe House in 58 Colenso Street, Sumner, Christchurch, which was listed as Category II on 31 March 2000. The other is the design of the 1955 extension to the Christ's College Chapel. While the size of the chapel doubled, the Gothic Revival appearance of the school's quadrangle did not change.

During his secondary school time, Peter Beaven had a conversation with Pascoe that led him to choose architecture as a career.

Pascoe could be eccentric, and he would leave during important meetings because he always went to bed at 9pm. He died at his holiday home in Springfield on 11 September 1976.
