= Listed buildings in Cobham, Kent =

Historic structures in Kent, England

Cobham is a village and civil parish in the Gravesham district of Kent, England. It contains four grade I, three grade II* and 38 grade II listed buildings that are recorded in the National Heritage List for England.

This list is based on the information retrieved online from Historic England.

== Key ==
Grade	Criteria
I	Buildings that are of exceptional interest
II*	Particularly important buildings of more than special interest
II	Buildings that are of special interest

== Listing ==
Name	Grade	Location	Type	Completed (Note: The date given is the date used by Historic England as significant for the initial building or that of an important part in the structure's description.)	Date designated	Grid ref. (Note: The grid reference is based on the British national grid reference system, sometimes known as OSGB36, used by the Ordnance Survey.) Geo-coordinates	Notes	Entry number (Note: The "List Entry Number" is a unique number assigned to each listed building and scheduled monument by Historic England.)	Image	Wikidata
Cobham Hall (including Kitchen and Stable Court)	I				27 August 1952	TQ6836668914; 51°23′39″N 0°25′07″E		1095053	Cobham Hall (including Kitchen and Stable Court) More images	Q86753237
Cobham War Memorial	II	DA12 3BP			7 June 2016	TQ6738668414; 51°23′24″N 0°24′16″E		1435143	Cobham War Memorial More images	Q26678075
The Aviary, Cobham Hall	II	Cobham Hall			26 July 1983	TQ6851968988; 51°23′42″N 0°25′15″E		1350861	Upload Photo	Q26634021
The Dairy, Cobham Hall	II*	Cobham Hall			22 June 1982	TQ6833668617; 51°23′30″N 0°25′05″E		1350898	Upload Photo	Q17544930
The Engine House, Cobham Hall	II	Cobham Hall, Cobham Park			19 October 1995	TQ6842169421; 51°23′56″N 0°25′11″E		1262054	Upload Photo	Q26552956
The Mausoleum, Cobham Hall	I	Cobham Hall			27 August 1952	TQ6943768379; 51°23′21″N 0°26′02″E		1095055	The Mausoleum, Cobham Hall More images	Q5224147
The Temple, Cobham Hall	II	Cobham Hall			26 July 1983	TQ6855768964; 51°23′41″N 0°25′17″E		1095054	Upload Photo	Q26387383
Cobhambury House	II	Cobhambury Road			26 July 1983	TQ6734368249; 51°23′19″N 0°24′13″E		1095056	Upload Photo	Q26387384
Rose Cottage	II	Halfpence Lane			21 November 1966	TQ6738168435; 51°23′25″N 0°24′16″E		1095057	Upload Photo	Q26387385
Church of St Margaret, Ifield	II	Ifield, Church Road			21 November 1966	TQ6527770118; 51°24′22″N 0°22′30″E		1350862	Church of St Margaret, Ifield More images	Q26634022
Jeskyns Court	II	Jeskyns Road			26 July 1983	TQ6598169103; 51°23′48″N 0°23′04″E		1095060	Upload Photo	Q26387389
Jeskyns Court Granary	II	Jeskyns Road			26 July 1983	TQ6600769106; 51°23′48″N 0°23′06″E		1095061	Upload Photo	Q26387390
Rookery Farm Granary	II	Jeskyns Road			26 July 1983	TQ6643568728; 51°23′35″N 0°23′27″E		1095059	Upload Photo	Q26387388
Rookery Farm Thatched Barn	II	Jeskyns Road			23 January 1981	TQ6638368722; 51°23′35″N 0°23′24″E		1095058	Upload Photo	Q26387387
Dovecote at Lodge Farm	II	Lodge Lane			26 July 1983	TQ6803468361; 51°23′22″N 0°24′49″E		1356588	Upload Photo	Q26639228
Parish Boundary Stone	II	Roman Road			24 February 1993	TQ6835369554; 51°24′00″N 0°25′08″E		1346416	Upload Photo	Q26629966
Blackhorse Cottage	II	Round Street			26 July 1983	TQ6545668564; 51°23′31″N 0°22′36″E		1095062	Upload Photo	Q26387391
Bower Cottage	II	Sole Street			26 July 1983	TQ6566267614; 51°23′00″N 0°22′45″E		1096313	Upload Photo	Q26388604
Sole Street House	II	Sole Street			21 November 1966	TQ6579267775; 51°23′05″N 0°22′52″E		1067728	Upload Photo	Q26320525
Yeomans House	II	Sole Street			21 November 1966	TQ6568167658; 51°23′02″N 0°22′46″E		1095063	Upload Photo	Q26387392
26-30, the Street	II	26-30, The Street			23 February 1981	TQ6710168433; 51°23′25″N 0°24′01″E		1076989	Upload Photo	Q26343050
36 and 38, the Street	II	36 and 38, The Street			26 July 1983	TQ6705568438; 51°23′25″N 0°23′59″E		1076965	Upload Photo	Q26342971
63, the Street	II	63, The Street			26 July 1983	TQ6700868399; 51°23′24″N 0°23′56″E		1096316	Upload Photo	Q26388607
Cadmans Dillywood Cottage Murrells Old Post Cottage White Cottage	II	29-39, The Street			26 July 1983	TQ6708968419; 51°23′25″N 0°24′00″E		1096314	Upload Photo	Q26388605
Cobham College	I	The Street			28 August 2000	TQ6696868343; 51°23′22″N 0°23′54″E		1096317	Cobham College More images	Q17529813
Cottage Belonging to the Leather Bottle Inn	II	56, The Street			26 July 1983	TQ6697268458; 51°23′26″N 0°23′54″E		1049126	Upload Photo	Q26301180
Crockers Place	II	58 and 60, The Street			27 August 1952	TQ6696068480; 51°23′27″N 0°23′54″E		1096322	Upload Photo	Q26388612
Forge Cottages	II	8, The Street			21 November 1966	TQ6731468427; 51°23′25″N 0°24′12″E		1096320	Upload Photo	Q26388610
Forge Cottages	II	6, The Street			21 November 1966	TQ6732068427; 51°23′25″N 0°24′12″E		1350261	Upload Photo	Q26685408
Meadow Cottages	II	1 and 2, The Street			15 November 1977	TQ6681768527; 51°23′29″N 0°23′47″E		1096323	Upload Photo	Q26388613
Meadow House	II*	The Street			21 November 1966	TQ6699068623; 51°23′31″N 0°23′56″E		1373849	Upload Photo	Q17544941
Mill Farmhouse	II	The Street			21 November 1966	TQ6730068427; 51°23′25″N 0°24′11″E		1350260	Upload Photo	Q26633480
Owletts	II*	The Street			27 August 1952	TQ6651068734; 51°23′36″N 0°23′31″E		1049097	Owletts More images	Q15979224
Owletts' Cottage	II	The Street			26 July 1983	TQ6647068762; 51°23′37″N 0°23′29″E		1049086	Upload Photo	Q26301141
Owletts' Well House	II	The Street			26 July 1983	TQ6648768739; 51°23′36″N 0°23′30″E		1350224	Upload Photo	Q26633448
Parish Church of St Mary Magdalene	I	The Street			21 November 1966	TQ6696968383; 51°23′24″N 0°23′54″E		1350259	Parish Church of St Mary Magdalene More images	Q17529826
The Leather Bottle Inn	II	The Street			27 August 1952	TQ6699368452; 51°23′26″N 0°23′55″E		1350262	The Leather Bottle Inn More images	Q26633482
The Old Post Office	II	45-49, The Street			26 July 1983	TQ6705268423; 51°23′25″N 0°23′58″E		1096315	Upload Photo	Q26388606
The Ship Inn	II	The Street			26 July 1983	TQ6724368432; 51°23′25″N 0°24′08″E		1096319	The Ship Inn More images	Q26388609
The Stone House	II	55-61, The Street			21 November 1966	TQ6701568421; 51°23′25″N 0°23′57″E		1350258	Upload Photo	Q26633479
The Terrace	II	1-4, The Street			21 November 1966	TQ6674768539; 51°23′29″N 0°23′43″E		1096318	Upload Photo	Q26388608
The Village Pump	II	The Street			26 July 1983	TQ6693668476; 51°23′27″N 0°23′53″E		1350223	Upload Photo	Q26633447
The Village School	II	The Street			26 July 1983	TQ6715568447; 51°23′26″N 0°24′04″E		1096321	Upload Photo	Q26388611
Knights Place Farmhouse	II	Watling Street			21 November 1966	TQ7012768940; 51°23′38″N 0°26′38″E		1373832	Upload Photo	Q26654753
The Mount	II	Watling Street			26 July 1983	TQ6753969460; 51°23′58″N 0°24′25″E		1096324	Upload Photo	Q26388614

== See also ==
- Grade I listed buildings in Kent
- Grade II* listed buildings in Kent

== Sources ==
- Newman, John (2012) [1969], Kent: West and the Weald, The Buildings of England, New Haven and London: Yale University Press, ISBN 978-0-300-18509-6
