= Listed buildings in Higham, Kent =

Historic structures in Kent, England

Higham is a village and civil parish in the Gravesham district of Kent, England. It contains four grade I and 21 grade II listed buildings that are recorded in the National Heritage List for England.

This list is based on the information retrieved online from Historic England.

== Key ==
Grade	Criteria
I	Buildings that are of exceptional interest
II*	Particularly important buildings of more than special interest
II	Buildings that are of special interest

== Listing ==
Name	Grade	Location	Type	Completed (Note: The date given is the date used by Historic England as significant for the initial building or that of an important part in the structure's description.)	Date designated	Grid ref. (Note: The grid reference is based on the British national grid reference system, sometimes known as OSGB36, used by the Ordnance Survey.) Geo-coordinates	Notes	Entry number (Note: The "List Entry Number" is a unique number assigned to each listed building and scheduled monument by Historic England.)	Image	Wikidata
Gore Green Farmhouse	II	Bull Lane			21 November 1966	TQ7178073142; 51°25′52″N 0°28′11″E		1096325	Upload Photo	Q26388615
The Obelisk	II	Canal Road			29 January 1996	TQ7094673695; 51°26′11″N 0°27′29″E		1246068	Upload Photo	Q26538512
Barn Adjoining Church	II	Church Street			26 July 1983	TQ7167674261; 51°26′29″N 0°28′08″E		1049055	Upload Photo	Q26301111
Church of St Mary	I	Church Street			21 November 1966	TQ7164074207; 51°26′27″N 0°28′06″E		1350225	Church of St Mary More images	Q7594350
Clerk's Cottage	II	Church Street			31 August 1976	TQ7159174148; 51°26′25″N 0°28′03″E		1373858	Upload Photo	Q26654775
Dairy Farm House	II	Church Street			28 July 2000	TQ7152272919; 51°25′46″N 0°27′57″E		1381167	Upload Photo	Q26661292
Mockbeggar	II	Church Street			26 July 1983	TQ7321172269; 51°25′23″N 0°29′24″E		1350226	Upload Photo	Q26633449
The Old Vicarage	II	Church Street			31 August 1976	TQ7164274131; 51°26′25″N 0°28′06″E		1096326	Upload Photo	Q26388616
Gore Green Farm Barn	II	Gore Green Road			26 July 1983	TQ7198573125; 51°25′52″N 0°28′22″E		1373862	Upload Photo	Q26654779
Higham Mill (including Mill House, Granary and Cottage)	II	Granary And Cottage), Hermitage Road			26 July 1983	TQ7232471676; 51°25′04″N 0°28′37″E		1051065	Upload Photo	Q26302984
Gadshill Place	I	Gravesend Road			27 August 1952	TQ7102070872; 51°24′40″N 0°27′28″E		1049037	Gadshill Place More images	Q5516441
Sir John Falstaff Public House	II	Gravesend Road			26 July 1983	TQ7109970880; 51°24′40″N 0°27′32″E		1096327	Upload Photo	Q26388617
The Little Hermitage	II	Gravesend Road			26 July 1983	TQ7207970572; 51°24′29″N 0°28′22″E		1350227	Upload Photo	Q26633450
Firtrees	II	6, Hermitage Road			26 July 1983	TQ7117771399; 51°24′57″N 0°27′37″E		1350228	Upload Photo	Q26633451
Higham Mill (mill Building)	II	Hermitage Road			26 July 1983	TQ7228371662; 51°25′04″N 0°28′35″E		1096329	Upload Photo	Q26388619
Monument on Telegraph Hill	II	Hermitage Road			21 November 1966	TQ7146471163; 51°24′49″N 0°27′51″E		1096328	Upload Photo	Q26388618
Church of St John, Higham Upshire	II	Higham Upshire, Hermitage Road			26 July 1983	TQ7127671463; 51°24′59″N 0°27′42″E		1051091	Church of St John, Higham Upshire More images	Q26303011
Crutches Gate Cottage and Farmhouse	II	Old Watling Street			5 February 1975	TQ7074869564; 51°23′58″N 0°27′12″E		1096336	Upload Photo	Q26388626
White House Farm	II	School Lane			26 July 1983	TQ7180572247; 51°25′23″N 0°28′11″E		1096337	Upload Photo	Q26388627
White House Farm Barn	II	School Lane			26 July 1983	TQ7176472259; 51°25′24″N 0°28′09″E		1350230	Upload Photo	Q26633452
Barn at Higham Hall	II	Taylors Lane			21 November 1966	TQ7113872599; 51°25′36″N 0°27′37″E		1350231	Upload Photo	Q26633453
Garden Walls to Higham Hall	II	Taylors Lane			21 November 1966	TQ7115072701; 51°25′39″N 0°27′38″E		1096339	Upload Photo	Q26388629
Higham Hall	II	Taylors Lane			21 November 1966	TQ7114272650; 51°25′37″N 0°27′37″E		1096338	Upload Photo	Q26388628

== See also ==
- Grade I listed buildings in Kent
- Grade II* listed buildings in Kent

== Sources ==
- Newman, John (2012) [1969], Kent: West and the Weald, The Buildings of England, New Haven and London: Yale University Press, ISBN 978-0-300-18509-6
