= George Matthews Arnold =

English solicitor and politician

George Matthews Arnold KSG FSA
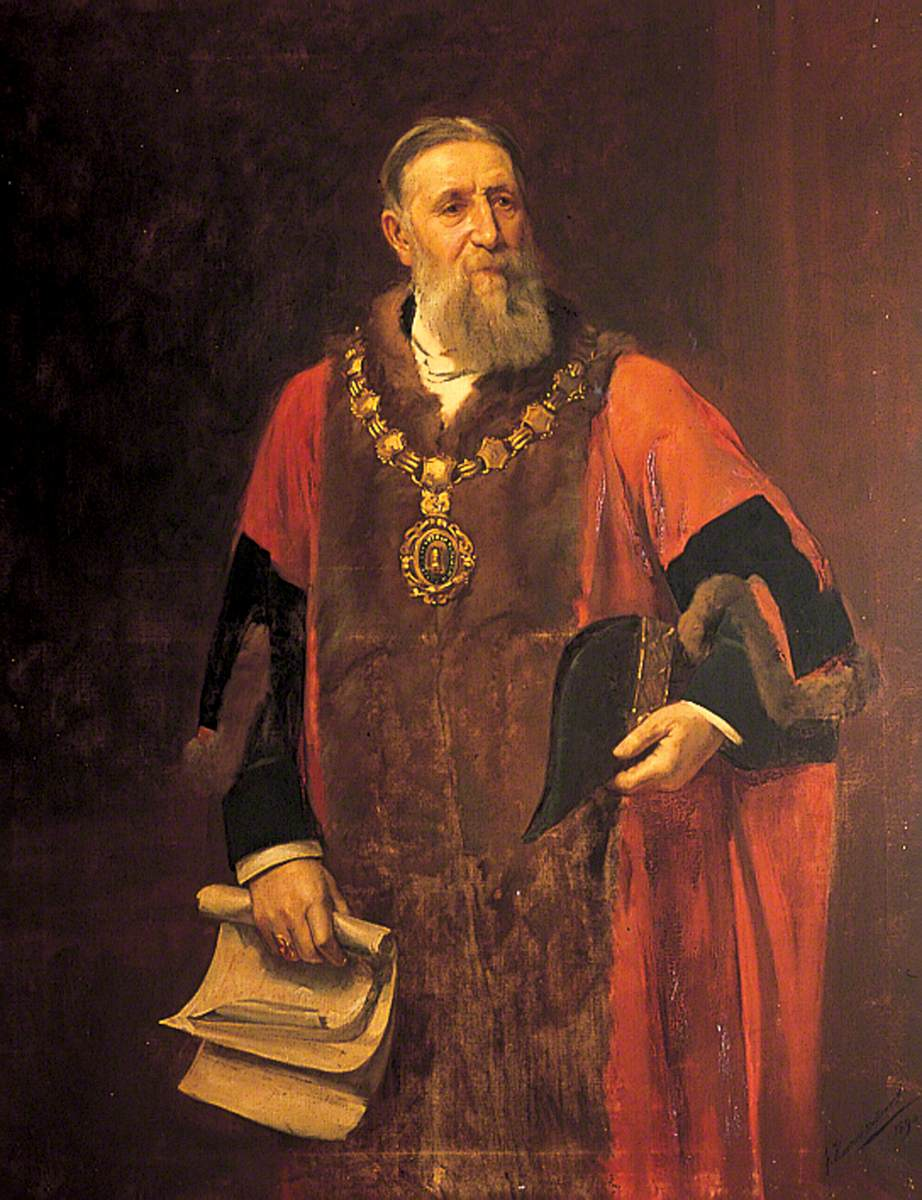

Mayor of Gravesend

Personal details
- Born: 4 July 1826
- Died: 28 May 1908
- Occupation: solicitor

George Matthews Arnold KSG FSA, (4 July 1826 – 28 May 1908) was an English solicitor and politician, serving as Mayor of Gravesend and as an Alderman of Kent County Council on its formation.

== Biography ==
George Matthews Arnold was born 4 July 1826, the son of Robert Coles Arnold, J.P., and brother of the poet and journalist Edwin Arnold. Arnold was educated privately for the law; admitted a Solicitor, and practiced in Gravesend. He became the Hon. Sec. of Society of District Auditors of England.

He married Elizabeth Cotton Essell, daughter of George Essell, solicitor of Rochester, in 1847.

Having interested himself in the religious controversies agitating the Church of England in the late 1850s Arnold, together with his wife, was received into the Catholic church by Cardinal Manning in 1860; shortly after this event he became legal adviser to the Bishop of Southwark, Thomas Grant. His professional work having meanwhile gravitated towards London, he acquired 60 Carey Street, a Queen Anne mansion in Lincoln's Inn noted for the woodwork of its interior. He afterwards built Milton Hall on the banks of the Thames, close to Gravesend, where he assembled a fine collection of Roman and other antiquities.

He was Mayor of Gravesend (1890-92, 1896-97, 1904-06), and a Justice of the Peace and Deputy Lieutenant of Kent. He was Alderman of the Kent County Council on its formation in 1888, and was Chairman of the Kent Education Committee from its formation till 1905. He was Chairman of the Law Union and Crown Insurance Co. and author of Gravesend in Days of Old and other archaeological works.

== Works ==
- "Gravesend in Days of Old". Archaeologia Cantiana. 11: xlii–lv. 1877.
- Robert Pocock, the Gravesend Historian, Naturalist, Antiquarian, Botanist, and Printer. London: Sampson Low, Marston, Searle, & Rivington. 1883.
- Dode, in Kent, with some account of its little Norman church, and of its early extinguishment. Gravesend: Caddel and Son. 1905.
