= Listed buildings in Gravesend =

Historic structures in Kent, England

Gravesend is town and a civil parish in the Gravesham district of Kent, England. It contains one grade I, 13 grade II* and 151 grade II listed buildings that are recorded in the National Heritage List for England.

This list is based on the information retrieved online from Historic England

== Key ==
Grade	Criteria
I	Buildings that are of exceptional interest
II*	Particularly important buildings of more than special interest
II	Buildings that are of special interest

== Listing ==
Name	Grade	Location	Type	Completed (Note: The date given is the date used by Historic England as significant for the initial building or that of an important part in the structure's description.)	Date designated	Grid ref. (Note: The grid reference is based on the British national grid reference system, sometimes known as OSGB36, used by the Ordnance Survey.) Geo-coordinates	Notes	Entry number (Note: The "List Entry Number" is a unique number assigned to each listed building and scheduled monument by Historic England.)	Image	Wikidata
The Railway Bell Public House	II	Anglesea Place			3 July 1975	TQ6457374093; 51°26′31″N 0°22′00″E		1089042	Upload Photo	Q26381458
1-9, Berkley Crescent	II	1-9, Berkley Crescent, Milton Park Estate			3 July 1975	TQ6501774102; 51°26′31″N 0°22′23″E		1341492	Upload Photo	Q26625580
1, Chalk Road	II	1, Chalk Road, Chalk			23 January 1952	TQ6700373055; 51°25′55″N 0°24′04″E		1089043	Upload Photo	Q26381459
44, Chalk Road	II	44, Chalk Road, Chalk			23 January 1952	TQ6713473010; 51°25′53″N 0°24′11″E		1341493	Upload Photo	Q26625581
K6 Telephone Kiosk	II	Christchurch Crescent			10 December 1987	TQ6507173508; 51°26′11″N 0°22′25″E		1089013	Upload Photo	Q26381431
Church of St Mary	II*	Church Lane, Chalk			23 January 1952	TQ6832572498; 51°25′35″N 0°25′11″E		1089044	Upload Photo	Q17544885
East Court Farmhouse	II	Church Lane			23 January 1952	TQ6842972920; 51°25′49″N 0°25′17″E		1089045	Upload Photo	Q26381460
Court Cottage	II	Church Road			26 July 1983	TQ6486370006; 51°24′18″N 0°22′08″E		1081086	Upload Photo	Q26356207
Ifield Court	II*	Church Road, Ifield Court			4 July 1952	TQ6478569957; 51°24′17″N 0°22′04″E		1350208	Upload Photo	Q17544925
Windmill Hill Gardens	II	Clarence Place, DA12 1HH			10 November 2016	TQ6497273470; 51°26′10″N 0°22′19″E		1432908	Upload Photo	Q66477666
29, Clarence Place	II	29, Clarence Place			3 July 1975	TQ6504773498; 51°26′11″N 0°22′23″E		1341494	Upload Photo	Q26625582
Homemead	II	30 and 31, Clarence Place			3 July 1975	TQ6504573462; 51°26′10″N 0°22′23″E		1089046	Upload Photo	Q26381461
Gravesend Railway Station (downside)	II	Clive Road			3 July 1975	TQ6459174042; 51°26′29″N 0°22′01″E		1341495	Upload Photo	Q26625583
Scruttons	II	37, Coldharbour Road			26 July 1983	TQ6338872667; 51°25′46″N 0°20′56″E		1081087	Upload Photo	Q26356209
Milton Chantry	II*	Commercial Place			23 January 1952	TQ6525474338; 51°26′38″N 0°22′35″E		1089047	Upload Photo	Q17361858
Cliff Top Entrance, Comprising Platform, Terrace Walls, Tunnel And Stairs To The Former Rosherville Gardens	II	Crete Hall Road, Northfleet			6 January 2011	TQ6345174166; 51°26′34″N 0°21′02″E		1396395	Upload Photo	Q26675184
Rosherville Gardens Bear Pit	II	located at TQ6358574313 off of Crete Hall Road			9 January 2014	TQ6358574313; 51°26′39″N 0°21′09″E		1415885	Upload Photo	Q26676472
Statue of Queen Victoria	II	Darnley Road			30 May 1984	TQ6445574046; 51°26′30″N 0°21′54″E		1240349	Upload Photo	Q26533278
New House	II	Dashwood Road			4 July 1952	TQ6422272729; 51°25′47″N 0°21′39″E		1350209	Upload Photo	Q26633433
New House Farmhouse	II	Dashwood Road			4 July 1952	TQ6414272878; 51°25′52″N 0°21′35″E		1081088	Upload Photo	Q26356211
Ye Olde Leather Bottel	II	Dover Road			26 July 1983	TQ6253274039; 51°26′31″N 0°20′14″E		1350210	Upload Photo	Q26633434
Hazells	II	Downs Road, Hazells			26 July 1983	TQ6270471539; 51°25′10″N 0°20′19″E		1081089	Upload Photo	Q26356212
Downs Hall	II	42 and 44, Downs Road			26 July 1983	TQ6330069749; 51°24′12″N 0°20′47″E		1350211	Upload Photo	Q26633435
Churchyard of the Church of St Peter and St Paul	II	East Milton Road, DA12 2JL			10 February 2017	TQ6583673820; 51°26′21″N 0°23′05″E		1441607	Upload Photo	Q66478347
1-8, East Terrace	II	1-8, East Terrace			3 July 1975	TQ6518574171; 51°26′33″N 0°22′32″E		1341496	Upload Photo	Q26625584
1-5, Edwin Street	II	1-5, Edwin Street			3 July 1975	TQ6494074054; 51°26′29″N 0°22′19″E		1089048	Upload Photo	Q26381462
Obelisk	II	Gordon Pleasure Gardens			3 July 1975	TQ6540774116; 51°26′31″N 0°22′43″E		1089049	Upload Photo	Q26381463
Statue of General Gordon	II	Gordon Pleasure Gardens			3 July 1975	TQ6543174204; 51°26′34″N 0°22′44″E		1367047	Upload Photo	Q26648580
Barrelled Lock Chamber, Sea Walls, Swing Bridge, Locks And Canal Basin	II	Gordon Promenade East			17 September 2010	TQ6564474237; 51°26′34″N 0°22′55″E		1393973	Upload Photo	Q26673103
Garden Wall and Gate Piers to Nos 1 and 2	II	Granby Place			26 July 1983	TQ6240674242; 51°26′38″N 0°20′08″E		1081090	Upload Photo	Q26356214
1 and 2, Granby Place	II	1 and 2, Granby Place			26 July 1983	TQ6239274243; 51°26′38″N 0°20′07″E		1367458	Upload Photo	Q26648958
New Tavern Fort	II*	Gravesend			24 February 1977	TQ6529274238; 51°26′35″N 0°22′37″E		1261173	Upload Photo	Q7012049
1-45, Harmer Street	II	1-45, Harmer Street			3 July 1975	TQ6503974175; 51°26′33″N 0°22′24″E		1341497	Upload Photo	Q26625585
1a and 2a, Harmer Street	II	1a and 2a, Harmer Street			3 July 1975	TQ6506374264; 51°26′36″N 0°22′25″E		1054816	Upload Photo	Q26306467
2-48, Harmer Street	II	2-48, Harmer Street			3 July 1975	TQ6506374169; 51°26′33″N 0°22′25″E		1089050	Upload Photo	Q26381464
Calf House	II	Hazells Farm, Northfleet, DA13 9PN			3 October 2012	TQ6263871582; 51°25′12″N 0°20′16″E		1409114	Upload Photo	Q26676051
Hazells Barn	II	Hazells Farm, Northfleet, DA13 9PN			3 October 2012	TQ6264971585; 51°25′12″N 0°20′16″E		1408526	Upload Photo	Q26676018
Chapel Farmhouse	II	Hever Court Road, Singlewell			3 July 1975	TQ6538370743; 51°24′42″N 0°22′36″E		1054798	Upload Photo	Q26306450
Corner Cottage	II	Hever Court Road, Singlewell			3 July 1975	TQ6532770765; 51°24′42″N 0°22′33″E		1341498	Upload Photo	Q26625586
Orchard House	II	Hever Court Road, Singlewell			23 January 1952	TQ6530770781; 51°24′43″N 0°22′32″E		1054827	Upload Photo	Q26306480
The George Inn	II	Hever Court Road, Singlewell			3 July 1975	TQ6542070712; 51°24′41″N 0°22′38″E		1089051	Upload Photo	Q26381465
The Factory Club	II	High Street			26 July 1983	TQ6204474390; 51°26′43″N 0°19′49″E		1081091	Upload Photo	Q26356215
The Three Daws Public House	II	High Street			23 January 1952	TQ6478474437; 51°26′42″N 0°22′11″E		1089052	Upload Photo	Q26381466
The Town Hall	II*	High Street			23 January 1952	TQ6477974271; 51°26′36″N 0°22′11″E		1054761	Upload Photo	Q17544852
Two K6 Telephone Kiosks Outside the Old Town Hall	II	High Street			5 March 2010	TQ6476574266; 51°26′36″N 0°22′10″E		1393707	Upload Photo	Q26672853
3 and 3a, High Street	II	3 and 3a, High Street			23 July 1975	TQ6477674409; 51°26′41″N 0°22′11″E		1054807	Upload Photo	Q26306458
4 and 5, High Street	II	4 and 5, High Street			3 July 1975	TQ6477674401; 51°26′41″N 0°22′11″E		1341499	Upload Photo	Q26625587
The Kent Public House	II	20, High Street			3 July 1975	TQ6477074310; 51°26′38″N 0°22′10″E		1089053	Upload Photo	Q26381467
55 and 55a, High Street	II	55 and 55a, High Street			3 July 1975	TQ6474974269; 51°26′36″N 0°22′09″E		1089054	Upload Photo	Q26381468
56, High Street	II	56, High Street			3 July 1975	TQ6474974276; 51°26′37″N 0°22′09″E		1367124	Upload Photo	Q26648649
57 and 58, High Street	II	57 and 58, High Street			3 July 1975	TQ6475074283; 51°26′37″N 0°22′09″E		1089055	Upload Photo	Q26381469
The Albion Public House	II	59, High Street			3 July 1975	TQ6475074289; 51°26′37″N 0°22′09″E		1089056	Upload Photo	Q26381470
70, High Street	II	70, High Street			3 July 1975	TQ6475574342; 51°26′39″N 0°22′10″E		1367125	Upload Photo	Q26648650
71 and 72, High Street	II	71 and 72, High Street			3 July 1975	TQ6475574348; 51°26′39″N 0°22′10″E		1089057	Upload Photo	Q26381471
73, High Street	II	73, High Street			3 July 1975	TQ6475474354; 51°26′39″N 0°22′10″E		1367087	Upload Photo	Q26648619
79, High Street	II*	79, High Street			19 March 1974	TQ6475774393; 51°26′40″N 0°22′10″E		1089059	Upload Photo	Q17544895
80, High Street	II*	80, High Street			19 March 1974	TQ6475774398; 51°26′41″N 0°22′10″E		1367090	Upload Photo	Q17544936
Parrock Hall	II	4-11, Joy Road			23 January 1952	TQ6544573116; 51°25′58″N 0°22′43″E		1054775	Upload Photo	Q26306429
K2 Telephone Kiosk Outside Crown Courts	II	King Street			10 December 1987	TQ6480774146; 51°26′32″N 0°22′12″E		1240061	Upload Photo	Q26533001
K6 Telephone Kiosk Outside Crown Courts	II	King Street			10 December 1987	TQ6481974140; 51°26′32″N 0°22′13″E		1089011	Upload Photo	Q26381429
County Court	II	26, King Street			3 July 1975	TQ6481374131; 51°26′32″N 0°22′12″E		1089061	Upload Photo	Q26381472
30, King Street	II	30, King Street			3 July 1975	TQ6477674141; 51°26′32″N 0°22′10″E		1366592	Upload Photo	Q26648176
Barn to North West of Filborough Farmhouse	II	Lower Higham Road, Chalk			3 July 1975	TQ6825073168; 51°25′57″N 0°25′09″E		1341481	Upload Photo	Q26625570
Filborough Farmhouse	II	Lower Higham Road, Chalk			3 July 1975	TQ6826373154; 51°25′57″N 0°25′09″E		1089020	Upload Photo	Q26381438
Granary at Little Filborough Farm	II	Lower Higham Road, Chalk			3 July 1975	TQ6825073188; 51°25′58″N 0°25′09″E		1089062	Upload Photo	Q26381474
Readers	II	Lower Higham Road, Chalk			23 January 1952	TQ6759373188; 51°25′58″N 0°24′35″E		1089019	Upload Photo	Q26381437
The Old Forge	II	Lower Higham Road, Chalk			3 July 1975	TQ6669673077; 51°25′56″N 0°23′48″E		1341520	Upload Photo	Q26625606
Gordon House and Milton House	II	10 and 10a, Milton Place			23 January 1952	TQ6518074121; 51°26′31″N 0°22′31″E		1089021	Upload Photo	Q26381439
14, Milton Place	II	14, Milton Place			3 July 1975	TQ6519874160; 51°26′32″N 0°22′32″E		1341482	Upload Photo	Q26625571
15, Milton Place	II	15, Milton Place			3 July 1975	TQ6520074179; 51°26′33″N 0°22′32″E		1089022	Upload Photo	Q26381440
16-19, Milton Place	II	16-19, Milton Place			3 July 1975	TQ6520374192; 51°26′33″N 0°22′33″E		1089023	Upload Photo	Q26381441
Church of St Peter and St Paul	II*	Milton Road			23 January 1952	TQ6589773831; 51°26′21″N 0°23′08″E		1341484	Upload Photo	Q17544914
Clock Tower	II	Milton Road			3 July 1975	TQ6502674079; 51°26′30″N 0°22′23″E		1089024	Upload Photo	Q26381442
K6 Telephone Kiosk	II	Milton Road			10 December 1987	TQ6488074079; 51°26′30″N 0°22′16″E		1089012	Upload Photo	Q26381430
Roman Catholic Church of St John the Evangelist. School Adjoining the Roman Catholic Church of St John the Evangelist to the North West	II	Milton Road			3 July 1975	TQ6490074073; 51°26′30″N 0°22′17″E		1089027	Upload Photo	Q26381445
The New Inn	II	1, Milton Road			3 July 1975	TQ6488974127; 51°26′32″N 0°22′16″E		1341483	Upload Photo	Q26625572
124-127, Milton Road	II	124-127, Milton Road			3 July 1975	TQ6526373930; 51°26′25″N 0°22′35″E		1089025	Upload Photo	Q26381443
144 and 145, Milton Road	II	144 and 145, Milton Road			31 July 1970	TQ6504174043; 51°26′29″N 0°22′24″E		1055826	Upload Photo	Q26307447
146, Milton Road	II	146, Milton Road			3 July 1975	TQ6500574058; 51°26′29″N 0°22′22″E		1341485	Upload Photo	Q26625573
The Grapes Public House	II	153, Milton Road			3 July 1975	TQ6494474077; 51°26′30″N 0°22′19″E		1089026	Upload Photo	Q26381444
157, Milton Road	II	157, Milton Road			23 January 1952	TQ6492174087; 51°26′30″N 0°22′18″E		1055841	Upload Photo	Q26307463
Nash Street Farmhouse	II	Nash Street			26 July 1983	TQ6410469011; 51°23′47″N 0°21′27″E		1350212	Upload Photo	Q26633436
Tudor Cottage	II	Nash Street			4 July 1952	TQ6410769042; 51°23′48″N 0°21′27″E		1054085	Upload Photo	Q26305767
Pillar Box at the Junction of Norfolk Road and St John's Road	II	Norfolk Road			3 July 1975	TQ6568173992; 51°26′26″N 0°22′57″E		1341486	Upload Photo	Q26625574
The Hill	II	Northfleet, DA11 9EU			23 October 2015	TQ6241974151; 51°26′35″N 0°20′08″E		1430440	Upload Photo	Q26677594
Kington House	II	38, Old Perry Street			4 July 1952	TQ6323673059; 51°25′59″N 0°20′49″E		1081092	Upload Photo	Q26356217
Granary in Grounds of the Old Manor to the North West of the House	II	Old Road East			23 January 1952	TQ6524473104; 51°25′58″N 0°22′33″E		1341487	Upload Photo	Q26625575
Old Manor	II	Old Road East			23 January 1952	TQ6527273093; 51°25′58″N 0°22′34″E		1366609	Upload Photo	Q26648191
Rose Villa	II	11, Old Road East			3 July 1975	TQ6488073071; 51°25′58″N 0°22′14″E		1055804	Upload Photo	Q26307426
Amoy Cottage	II	17, Old Road East			3 July 1975	TQ6490473055; 51°25′57″N 0°22′15″E		1089028	Upload Photo	Q26381446
Cemetery Gate and Lodges	II	Old Road West			23 January 1952	TQ6411673257; 51°26′04″N 0°21′35″E		1089029	Upload Photo	Q26381447
Mortuary Chapel at Cemetery	II	Old Road West			3 July 1975	TQ6409173220; 51°26′03″N 0°21′33″E		1366632	Upload Photo	Q26648213
Gate Piers to No 1	II	Parrock Road			3 July 1975	TQ6508073476; 51°26′10″N 0°22′25″E		1055780	Upload Photo	Q26307401
1, Parrock Road	II	1, Parrock Road			3 July 1975	TQ6507673463; 51°26′10″N 0°22′25″E		1341488	Upload Photo	Q26625576
Echo Lodge	II	29, Parrock Road			3 July 1975	TQ6516673250; 51°26′03″N 0°22′29″E		1089030	Upload Photo	Q26381448
31, Parrock Road	II	31, Parrock Road			3 July 1975	TQ6516473242; 51°26′03″N 0°22′29″E		1089031	Upload Photo	Q26381449
188-192, Parrock Street	II	188-192, Parrock Street			3 July 1975	TQ6488874049; 51°26′29″N 0°22′16″E		1366625	Upload Photo	Q26648206
195 and 196, Parrock Street	II	195 and 196, Parrock Street			3 July 1975	TQ6485974065; 51°26′30″N 0°22′15″E		1089032	Upload Photo	Q26381450
Zoar Chapel	II	Peacock Street			1 March 1991	TQ6503773910; 51°26′25″N 0°22′24″E		1240086	Upload Photo	Q26533024
20, Peacock Street	II	20, Peacock Street			3 July 1975	TQ6506373876; 51°26′23″N 0°22′25″E		1089033	Upload Photo	Q26381451
93-95, Peacock Street	II	93-95, Peacock Street			3 July 1975	TQ6503873889; 51°26′24″N 0°22′24″E		1055730	Upload Photo	Q26309478
Bronte School and Attached Conservatory	II	Pelham Road			10 September 1998	TQ6433973908; 51°26′25″N 0°21′47″E		1376500	Upload Photo	Q26657049
Church of All Saints	II*	Perry Street			30 July 1986	TQ6355273114; 51°26′00″N 0°21′05″E		1346415	Upload Photo	Q17544919
2, Perry Street	II	2, Perry Street			3 September 1979	TQ6365173198; 51°26′03″N 0°21′11″E		1367426	Upload Photo	Q26648930
Church of St George	II*	Princes Street, DA11 0DJ			23 January 1952	TQ6468974341; 51°26′39″N 0°22′06″E		1089034	Upload Photo	Q7593137
Statue of Princess Pocahontas in Churchyard of the Church of St George	II	Princes Street			3 July 1975	TQ6466174327; 51°26′38″N 0°22′05″E		1057700	Upload Photo	Q26309866
Statue of Queen Victoria in Borough Market House	II	Princes Street			3 July 1975	TQ6485774258; 51°26′36″N 0°22′15″E		1089035	Upload Photo	Q26381452
26 and 28, Queen Street	II	26 and 28, Queen Street			3 July 1975	TQ6489474233; 51°26′35″N 0°22′17″E		1089036	Upload Photo	Q26381453
Gravesend Railway Station (up Side)	II	Rathmore Road			3 July 1975	TQ6459174011; 51°26′28″N 0°22′01″E		1057649	Upload Photo	Q26309820
Church of St Mary (roman Catholic)	II	Rochester Road, Denton			23 January 1952	TQ6611273525; 51°26′11″N 0°23′19″E		1089037	Upload Photo	Q26381454
1-4, Royal Pier Mews	II	1-4, Royal Pier Mews, DA12 2AZ			3 July 1975	TQ6498974379; 51°26′40″N 0°22′22″E		1374522	Upload Photo	Q26655387
St Andrew's Arts Centre	II	Royal Pier Road			3 July 1975	TQ6491174411; 51°26′41″N 0°22′18″E		1039109	Upload Photo	Q26290890
The Royal Terrace Pier, Including The Pavilions Flanking The Entrance	II	Royal Pier Road			13 May 1971	TQ6511474443; 51°26′42″N 0°22′28″E		1341489	Upload Photo	Q7374905
The Mission House	II	19, Royal Pier Road			3 July 1975	TQ6491974407; 51°26′41″N 0°22′18″E		1089038	Upload Photo	Q26381455
Thames House	II	29, Royal Pier Road, DA12 2BD			3 July 1975	TQ6492574380; 51°26′40″N 0°22′19″E		1038337	Upload Photo	Q26290051
Woodbine Cottage	II	8, Shrubbery Road			3 July 1975	TQ6502873378; 51°26′07″N 0°22′22″E		1341490	Upload Photo	Q26625578
9-12, Shrubbery Road	II	9-12, Shrubbery Road			3 July 1975	TQ6501073360; 51°26′07″N 0°22′21″E		1089040	Upload Photo	Q26381456
17-19, Shrubbery Road	II	17-19, Shrubbery Road			3 July 1975	TQ6498973338; 51°26′06″N 0°22′20″E		1038282	Upload Photo	Q26289999
Windmill Terrace	II	25-29, Shrubbery Road			23 September 1994	TQ6496173338; 51°26′06″N 0°22′19″E		1240108	Upload Photo	Q26533045
Constitution Crescent	II	1-4, South Hill Road			3 July 1975	TQ6500073278; 51°26′04″N 0°22′21″E		1341491	Upload Photo	Q26625579
The Old Rectory House	II*	Springhead Road			4 July 1952	TQ6233173419; 51°26′11″N 0°20′03″E		1081093	Upload Photo	Q17544855
20-24, Stone Street	II	20-24, Stone Street			3 July 1975	TQ6470673982; 51°26′27″N 0°22′07″E		1341510	Upload Photo	Q26625597
Two K6 Telephone Kiosks Outside Former Post Office	II	The Grove			5 March 2010	TQ6502274029; 51°26′28″N 0°22′23″E		1393703	Upload Photo	Q26672849
Church of Our Lady of the Assumption	II*	The Hill			26 July 1983	TQ6247574089; 51°26′33″N 0°20′11″E		1081094	Upload Photo	Q17544862
K6 Telephone Kiosk	II	The Hill			31 March 1988	TQ6251874095; 51°26′33″N 0°20′13″E		1083902	Upload Photo	Q26367100
Parish Church of St Botolph	I	The Hill			4 July 1952	TQ6234974141; 51°26′35″N 0°20′05″E		1054093	Upload Photo	Q17529806
7, The Hill	II	7, The Hill			26 July 1983	TQ6246574141; 51°26′35″N 0°20′11″E		1367390	Upload Photo	Q26648899
The Coach and Horses Public House	II	24 and 25, The Hill			26 July 1983	TQ6242674187; 51°26′36″N 0°20′09″E		1081095	Upload Photo	Q26356218
31, The Hill	II	31, The Hill			26 July 1983	TQ6244974203; 51°26′37″N 0°20′10″E		1081096	Upload Photo	Q26356220
Bevan's War Memorial in Northfleet Cement Works	II	The Shore, Northfleet			17 May 2006	TQ6233274763; 51°26′55″N 0°20′05″E		1391662	Upload Photo	Q26671015
Northfleet Lower Lighthouse	II	The Shore			1 November 2006	TQ6254174721; 51°26′53″N 0°20′16″E		1392254	Upload Photo	Q26671484
Rosherville Quay Walls, Steps, Drawdock And Wwii Mine Watching Post	II	The Shore			6 January 2011	TQ6370474490; 51°26′45″N 0°21′16″E		1396396	Upload Photo	Q26675185
Custom House	II	The Terrace, DA12 2GA			3 July 1975	TQ6519374318; 51°26′38″N 0°22′32″E		1088999	Upload Photo	Q26381418
Former Stables to No 39	II	The Terrace			3 July 1975	TQ6506874275; 51°26′36″N 0°22′26″E		1341512	Upload Photo	Q26625599
Gazebo in Grounds of Hm Customs and Immigration Office	II	The Terrace			3 July 1975	TQ6522974402; 51°26′40″N 0°22′34″E		1341511	Upload Photo	Q26625598
Terrace Tavern	II	The Terrace			3 July 1975	TQ6511774295; 51°26′37″N 0°22′28″E		1089003	Upload Photo	Q26381422
39, The Terrace	II	39, The Terrace			3 July 1975	TQ6507274295; 51°26′37″N 0°22′26″E		1089000	Upload Photo	Q26381419
42, The Terrace	II	42, The Terrace			3 July 1975	TQ6509474296; 51°26′37″N 0°22′27″E		1089001	Upload Photo	Q26381420
43, The Terrace	II	43, The Terrace			3 July 1975	TQ6509974295; 51°26′37″N 0°22′27″E		1089002	Upload Photo	Q26381421
45, The Terrace	II	45, The Terrace			3 July 1975	TQ6510674295; 51°26′37″N 0°22′28″E		1341513	Upload Photo	Q23305497
47, The Terrace	II	47, The Terrace			3 July 1975	TQ6515874282; 51°26′36″N 0°22′30″E		1089006	Upload Photo	Q26381424
The Town Pier	II*	Town Pier			3 July 1975	TQ6477474480; 51°26′43″N 0°22′11″E		1089004	Upload Photo	Q5597925
3-5, Town Pier	II	3-5, Town Pier			3 July 1975	TQ6475974439; 51°26′42″N 0°22′10″E		1341514	Upload Photo	Q26625601
78-80, Vale Road	II	78-80, Vale Road			26 July 1983	TQ6315973071; 51°25′59″N 0°20′45″E		1040057	Upload Photo	Q26291861
Murrells	II	157, Vale Road			4 July 1952	TQ6326573084; 51°26′00″N 0°20′50″E		1346410	Upload Photo	Q26629960
The Earl Grey Public House	II	177, Vale Road			26 July 1983	TQ6334673071; 51°25′59″N 0°20′55″E		1083888	Upload Photo	Q26367039
54-58, Vicarage Lane	II	54-58, Vicarage Lane, Chalk			3 July 1975	TQ6712873078; 51°25′55″N 0°24′10″E		1089005	Upload Photo	Q26381423
1 and 2, Victoria Road	II	1 and 2, Victoria Road			3 September 1979	TQ6367273213; 51°26′03″N 0°21′12″E		1083889	Upload Photo	Q26367044
11, Victoria Road	II	11, Victoria Road			3 September 1979	TQ6366573305; 51°26′06″N 0°21′12″E		1083890	Upload Photo	Q26367049
The Waterloo Public House	II	55, Wellington Street			3 July 1975	TQ6508373670; 51°26′17″N 0°22′25″E		1354763	Upload Photo	Q26637600
44, West Street	II	44, West Street			3 July 1975	TQ6450774432; 51°26′42″N 0°21′57″E		1341515	Upload Photo	Q26625602
Hazards House and Former Brewery Offices	II	45, West Street			20 May 1987	TQ6449574428; 51°26′42″N 0°21′56″E		1261036	Upload Photo	Q26552015
The New Falcon Inn	II	87, West Street			3 July 1975	TQ6468474439; 51°26′42″N 0°22′06″E		1025874	Upload Photo	Q26276802
96, 97, 98, West Street	II	96, 97, 98, West Street			25 September 1990	TQ6474674432; 51°26′42″N 0°22′09″E		1261190	Upload Photo	Q26552160
Public Library	II	Windmill Street			3 July 1975	TQ6478374116; 51°26′31″N 0°22′11″E		1341516	Upload Photo	Q26625603
Tivoli House	II	Windmill Street			1 March 1991	TQ6476973464; 51°26′10″N 0°22′09″E		1089014	Upload Photo	Q26381432
St George's Terrace	II	38-50, Windmill Street			3 July 1975	TQ6476073846; 51°26′23″N 0°22′09″E		1025880	Upload Photo	Q26276809
51-54, Windmill Street	II	51-54, Windmill Street			3 July 1975	TQ6475973791; 51°26′21″N 0°22′09″E		1089007	Upload Photo	Q26381425
55-59, Windmill Street	II	55-59, Windmill Street			3 July 1975	TQ6476173749; 51°26′20″N 0°22′09″E		1089008	Upload Photo	Q26381426
68 and 69, Windmill Street	II	68 and 69, Windmill Street			3 July 1975	TQ6476873676; 51°26′17″N 0°22′09″E		1025845	Upload Photo	Q26276777
70 and 71, Windmill Street	II	70 and 71, Windmill Street			3 July 1975	TQ6476973663; 51°26′17″N 0°22′09″E		1341517	Upload Photo	Q26625604
109 and 110, Windmill Street	II	109 and 110, Windmill Street			3 July 1975	TQ6473873558; 51°26′13″N 0°22′07″E		1025847	Upload Photo	Q26276779
123-126, Windmill Street	II	123-126, Windmill Street			3 July 1975	TQ6473873670; 51°26′17″N 0°22′08″E		1089009	Upload Photo	Q26381427
Eastern Edge of Woodlands Park	II	Wrotham Road			18 September 2013	TQ6445272889; 51°25′52″N 0°21′52″E		1414432	Upload Photo	Q26676412
62 and 64, Wrotham Road	II	62 and 64, Wrotham Road			3 July 1975	TQ6462373609; 51°26′15″N 0°22′02″E		1089010	Upload Photo	Q26381428

== See also ==
- Grade I listed buildings in Kent
- Grade II* listed buildings in Kent

== Sources ==
- Newman, John (2012) [1969], Kent: West and the Weald, The Buildings of England, New Haven and London: Yale University Press, ISBN 978-0-300-18509-6
