= Listed buildings in Shorne =

Civil Parish in Kent, England

Shorne is a village and civil parish in the Gravesham district of Kent, England. It contains two grade II* and 22 grade II listed buildings that are recorded in the National Heritage List for England.

This list is based on the information retrieved online from Historic England.

== Key ==
Grade	Criteria
I	Buildings that are of exceptional interest
II*	Particularly important buildings of more than special interest
II	Buildings that are of special interest

== Listing ==
Name	Grade	Location	Type	Completed (Note: The date given is the date used by Historic England as significant for the initial building or that of an important part in the structure's description.)	Date designated	Grid ref. (Note: The grid reference is based on the British national grid reference system, sometimes known as OSGB36, used by the Ordnance Survey.) Geo-coordinates	Notes	Entry number (Note: The "List Entry Number" is a unique number assigned to each listed building and scheduled monument by Historic England.)	Image	Wikidata
Shorne War Memorial	II	Butcher's Hill, DA12 3EF			17 May 2016	TQ6906371059; 51°24′48″N 0°25′47″E		1434930	Shorne War Memorial More images	Q26678052
Church of St Peter and St Paul	II*	Butchers Hill			21 November 1966	TQ6906171020; 51°24′47″N 0°25′47″E	C13 lancet, C14 S aisle, monument to Sir Henry de Cobham +c, 1316	1083891	Church of St Peter and St Paul More images	Q17544866
The Old Parsonage	II	Butchers Hill			27 August 1952	TQ6897871054; 51°24′48″N 0°25′43″E		1083892	Upload Photo	Q26367054
K6 Telephone Kiosk	II	Chestnut Green, Shorne Ridgeway			31 March 1988	TQ6935070330; 51°24′24″N 0°26′01″E		1083903	Upload Photo	Q26367106
Front Garden Wall and Gate Piers to Pipes Place	II	Forge Lane			26 July 1983	TQ6922871399; 51°24′59″N 0°25′56″E		1083894	Upload Photo	Q26367065
Little St Katherine's	II*	Forge Lane			27 August 1952	TQ6925171459; 51°25′01″N 0°25′57″E		1083895	Little St Katherine's More images	Q17544871
Pipes Place	II	Forge Lane			27 August 1952	TQ6924871395; 51°24′59″N 0°25′57″E		1083893	Upload Photo	Q26367059
St Katherine's House	II	Forge Lane			14 March 1973	TQ6921671450; 51°25′01″N 0°25′56″E		1083896	Upload Photo	Q26367069
Green Farm Granary	II	Green Farm Lane			26 July 1983	TQ6955972428; 51°25′32″N 0°26′15″E		1083897	Upload Photo	Q26367075
Green Farm House	II	Green Farm Lane			21 November 1966	TQ6959372440; 51°25′32″N 0°26′17″E		1346411	Upload Photo	Q26629962
10, 11 and 12, Homewood Cottages	II	10, 11 and 12, Homewood Cottages, Tanyard Hill, DA12 3LE			1 June 1976	TQ6931270339; 51°24′24″N 0°25′59″E		1045876	Upload Photo	Q26297985
6, Homewood Cottages	II	6, Homewood Cottages, Tanyard Hill, DA12 3LE			5 August 1982	TQ6932170318; 51°24′24″N 0°25′59″E		1083900	Upload Photo	Q26367089
7, Homewood Cottages	II	7, Homewood Cottages, Tanyard Hill, DA12 3LE			1 June 1976	TQ6931870327; 51°24′24″N 0°25′59″E		1370024	Upload Photo	Q26894977
8 and 9, Homewood Cottages	II	8 and 9, Homewood Cottages, Tanyard Hill, DA12 3LE			1 June 1976	TQ6931470332; 51°24′24″N 0°25′59″E		1346414	Upload Photo	Q26685350
Chapel of St Katherine	II	Malthouse Lane			27 August 1952	TQ6920271454; 51°25′01″N 0°25′55″E		1040014	Chapel of St Katherine More images	Q26291818
Bushylees	II	Pear Tree Lane			16 March 1976	TQ6982470358; 51°24′25″N 0°26′25″E		1346412	Upload Photo	Q26629963
Well Cottage	II	Pear Tree Lane			26 May 1976	TQ6978670338; 51°24′24″N 0°26′23″E		1369994	Upload Photo	Q26651260
Baynards Cottage	II	Shorne Ifield Road			22 June 1990	TQ6828370914; 51°24′44″N 0°25′06″E		1252853	Upload Photo	Q26544683
The Tanyard	II	Tanyard Hill			26 July 1983	TQ6919770795; 51°24′39″N 0°25′53″E		1045897	Upload Photo	Q26298008
8 and 10, the Street	II	8 and 10, The Street			21 November 1966	TQ6911371224; 51°24′53″N 0°25′50″E		1083898	Upload Photo	Q26367080
Harmony Hill and the Post Office	II	2 and 4, The Street			21 November 1966	TQ6911271250; 51°24′54″N 0°25′50″E		1045890	Upload Photo	Q26297999
Prospect Cottage	II	1, The Street, DA12 3EA			26 July 1983	TQ6914371256; 51°24′54″N 0°25′51″E		1083899	Upload Photo	Q26367085
The Old Vicarage	II	The Street			26 July 1983	TQ6911871102; 51°24′49″N 0°25′50″E		1346413	The Old Vicarage More images	Q26629964
White Horse Cottage	II	Thong Lane			21 November 1966	TQ6727570620; 51°24′36″N 0°24′14″E		1083901	Upload Photo	Q26367095

== See also ==
- Grade I listed buildings in Kent
- Grade II* listed buildings in Kent

== Sources ==
- Newman, John (2012) [1969], Kent: West and the Weald, The Buildings of England, New Haven and London: Yale University Press, ISBN 978-0-300-18509-6
