= Listed buildings in Luddesdown =

Historic structures in Kent, England

Luddesdown is a village and civil parish in the Gravesham district of Kent, England. It contains one grade I, one grade II* and 5 grade II listed buildings that are recorded in the National Heritage List for England.

This list is based on the information retrieved online from Historic England.

== Key ==
Grade	Criteria
I	Buildings that are of exceptional interest
II*	Particularly important buildings of more than special interest
II	Buildings that are of special interest

== Listing ==
Name	Grade	Location	Type	Completed (Note: The date given is the date used by Historic England as significant for the initial building or that of an important part in the structure's description.)	Date designated	Grid ref. (Note: The grid reference is based on the British national grid reference system, sometimes known as OSGB36, used by the Ordnance Survey.) Geo-coordinates	Notes	Entry number (Note: The "List Entry Number" is a unique number assigned to each listed building and scheduled monument by Historic England.)	Image	Wikidata
Brookers Farm	II	Cutter Ridge Road			26 July 1983	TQ6728366693; 51°22′29″N 0°24′08″E		1096340	Upload Photo	Q26388630
Swanswood Farm	II	Harvel			2 May 1986	TQ6518662365; 51°20′11″N 0°22′12″E		1252828	Upload Photo	Q26544660
Little Buckland	II	Henley Street			26 July 1983	TQ6591966976; 51°22′39″N 0°22′57″E		1350232	Upload Photo	Q26633454
Reynolds Farmhouse	II	Henley Street			21 November 1966	TQ6657867117; 51°22′43″N 0°23′32″E		1096341	Upload Photo	Q26388631
Boughurst Farmhouse	II	Leywood Road			21 November 1966	TQ6597563170; 51°20′36″N 0°22′54″E		1350233	Upload Photo	Q26633455
Luddesdown Court	I	Luddesdown Road			27 August 1952	TQ6691366164; 51°22′12″N 0°23′47″E		1096343	Luddesdown Court More images	Q17529817
Parish Church of St Peter and St Paul	II*	Luddesdown Road			21 November 1966	TQ6695566177; 51°22′12″N 0°23′50″E		1096342	Parish Church of St Peter and St Paul More images	Q17544899

== See also ==
- Grade I listed buildings in Kent
- Grade II* listed buildings in Kent

== Sources ==
- Newman, John (2012) [1969], Kent: West and the Weald, The Buildings of England, New Haven and London: Yale University Press, ISBN 978-0-300-18509-6
