= Luddesdown =

Village in Kent, England

Coordinates: 51.373°N 0.400°E

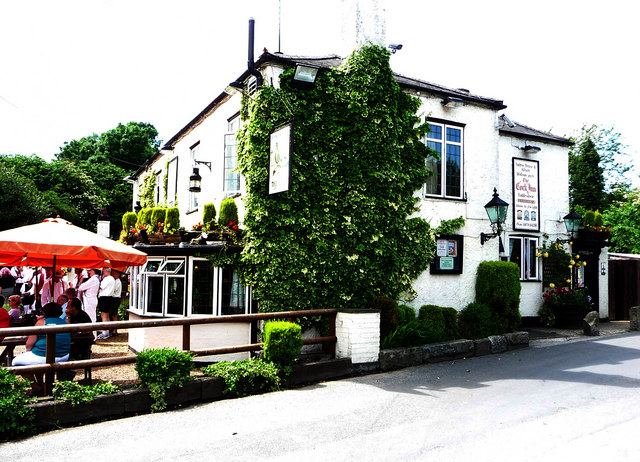
- The Cock Inn, Henley Street, Luddesd'n

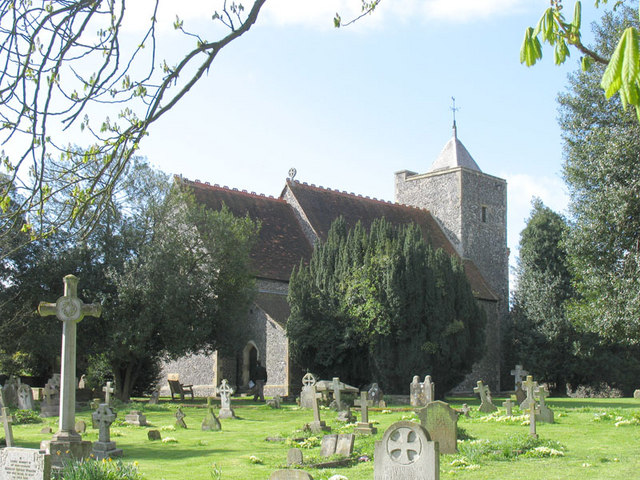
- The Church of St Peter and St Paul

- Location within Kent
- Population: 220 (2011)
- OS grid reference: TQ675665
- Civil parish: Luddesdown
- District: Gravesham
- Shire county: Kent
- Region: South East
- Country: England
- Sovereign state: United Kingdom
- Post town: Gravesend
- Postcode district: DA13
- Police: Kent
- Fire: Kent
- Ambulance: South East Coast
- UK Parliament: Gravesham
- Website: Parish Council

Luddesdown (/ˈlʌdzdən/) is a village and civil parish in the Gravesham district of Kent, England. In 2011 the parish had a population of 220.

== Geography ==
This rural parish, forming part of the North Downs Area of Outstanding Natural Beauty, lies in a dry valley to the south of Gravesend. It is named after a scattered group of houses and farms around Luddesdown Court, which has the parish church next to it.

The civil parish also contains the hamlets of Henley Street to the north, and parts of the hamlets of Great Buckland and Boughurst Street, both straddling the boundary with Snodland parish.

The valley narrows quickly to the south of Buckland, at the top of the dry valley floor. In this steep valley, facing west, is a vineyard, Monk's Vineyard; east are these woods: College, Haydown, Brazenden, Scrubes, Wrenches and Goss Hilly; Red Wood is to the north east. Apart from this eastern edge, there are Fowles/Brimp, Luxon, Molehill, Freezelands, Round, Tom Loft's, Longfield and Henley Woods. These are part of the now long and narrow Rochester Forest, much of which would have been used for the chandlery/shipbuilding of the Medway towns. Most afford access under the Countryside and Rights of Way Act.

== History ==
Luddesdown is first recorded in 975 as Hludes duna (Hlud's hill); in 1186 it was Ludesdon and in 1610 Luddesdowne. It is pronounced Ludsdun. In 939 there was a mound nearby called Hludes beorh, suggesting that Hlud was a prominent citizen.

The church, originally belonging to the local manor and dedicated to St Peter and St Paul, has Grade II* listed status; it is part of the ecclesiastical parish of Cobham to the north. The former church school now operates as a village hall.

The small Norman chapel of Dode, now just inside Snodland parish, was also associated with Luddesdown. Dode village was ravaged by the Black Death in 1349; it never recovered and was erased from the map. The chapel was restored in the 1990s and is an approved premise to conduct civil ceremonies including civil weddings. It is on the west side of the minor road south of Great Buckland.

Luddesdown Court is early mediæval and was the residence of William the Conqueror's half-brother until 1082. Some sources indicate that it may be "the oldest continually occupied house in the country". Other sources state that the oldest is Saltford Manor House in Saltford, Somerset, near Bath. The Court property is Grade I listed for its (inter alia) oak beam supported hall with 10 windows, five to each side, with flint and stone dressing of the whole building. It has wall paintings to the lower chamber and 16th and 19th-century extensions. There is a 14th-century fireplace.

Luddesdown was a parish in Strood Rural District, though local tax levels were set and services were also provided by Kent County Council prior to 1974.

In the 1983 the Ministry of Defence bought 630 acres of farmland in the Luddesdown valley and sought permission to use it for infantry training. Local residents campaigned against the proposal and the local MP, Tim Brinton, successfully lobbied for a public inquiry. This decided against the proposal, and it was formally rejected by the Secretary of State for the Environment.

== Sport ==
The parish has a cricket club, founded in 1947, Luddesdowne CC.

== See also ==
- Listed buildings in Luddesdown – Civil Parish in Kent, England
