= Higham, Kent =

Village in Kent, England

Coordinates: 51°24′54″N 0°27′47″E

Higham
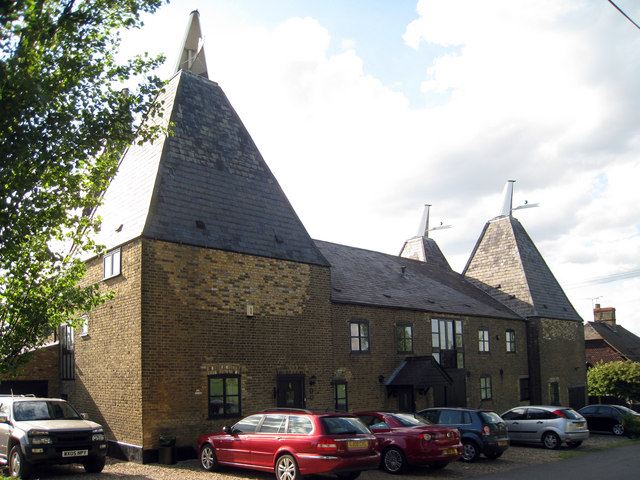
- Whitehouse Farm Oast

- Location within Kent
- Population: 3,962 (2011 Census)
- OS grid reference: TQ715715
- District: Gravesham
- Shire county: Kent
- Region: South East
- Country: England
- Sovereign state: United Kingdom
- Post town: ROCHESTER
- Postcode district: ME3
- Dialling code: 01474; 01634
- Police: Kent
- Fire: Kent
- Ambulance: South East Coast
- UK Parliament: Gravesham

Higham /ˈhaɪ.əm/ is a village, civil parish and electoral ward in the borough of Gravesham in Kent, England. The village lies south-east of Gravesend and just north-west of Strood, in Medway. The civil parish had a population of 3,938 at the 2001 Census, increasing slightly to 3,962 at the 2011 Census.

Higham is formally twinned with the Ukrainian villages of Novyi Bilous in the Chernihiv Region of Ukraine.

== History ==
A Roman grave and artefacts have been found at the north end of the village.

The priory dedicated to St. Mary was built on land granted by Queen Matilda for the benefit of her veiled daughter, Mary. In 1148, the nuns of St Sulphice-la-Foret, Brittany, moved to Higham. Higham Priory was also known as Lillechurch. On 6 July 1227, King Henry III confirmed the royal grant to the abbey of St. Mary and St. Sulpice of Lillechurch.

The original parish church, the Church of St Mary, was built in the 13th and 14th centuries and stands to the north of the present village, in the hamlet of Church Street. Redundant since the early 1980s, it is in the care of the Churches Conservation Trust, and is open to visitors daily. It contains much medieval woodwork, and its pulpit is one of the oldest in Kent, dating from the 14th century. Charles Dickens' daughter Kate was married here in 1860.

The Higham Village History Group, founded in 1997, is devoted to assembling the history of the village.

== Parts of Higham ==
Higham has developed as two parts, the original Saxon village of Higham to the north (now Lower Higham), and a more recent settlement to the south around the main road linking Gravesend to Rochester (Upper Higham), which grew in size and importance during the 1800s.

== Village facilities ==
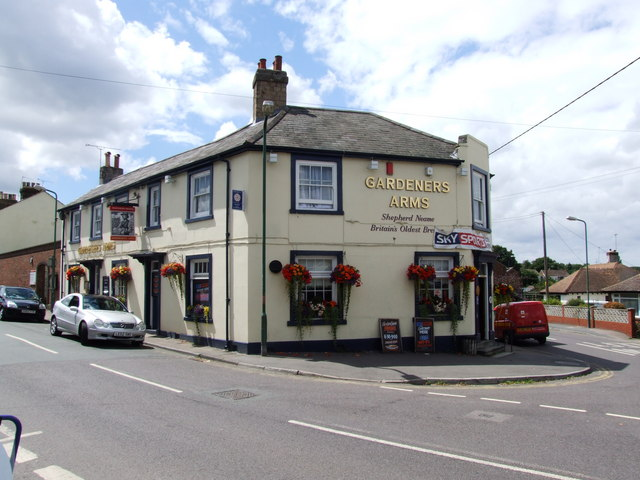
The Gardeners Arms

Services within the village are centred on the two parts of Higham.

Higham (upper) is the larger and is the site of a post office, a GP's surgery, a library and several shops and pubs. It is also the location of the current parish church of St John's, consecrated in 1862.

Higham (lower) is smaller. It originally had four pubs (all closed): The Sun Inn, The Chequers, The Railway Tavern and the Malt Shovel; a garage and Higham railway station. Until recently, there was a Post Office and shop serving this area of the village. Church Street is one-half mile (0.80 km) north of the station and is the location of the now redundant St Mary's Church and a small number of houses.

The village primary school (Higham County Primary), village hall (Higham Memorial Hall), park (Higham Recreation Ground) and tennis courts lie between the two parts of the village on School Lane. Until the 1990s, the GP surgery serving the village was also based in this area.

== Points of interest ==
=== Gad's Hill ===
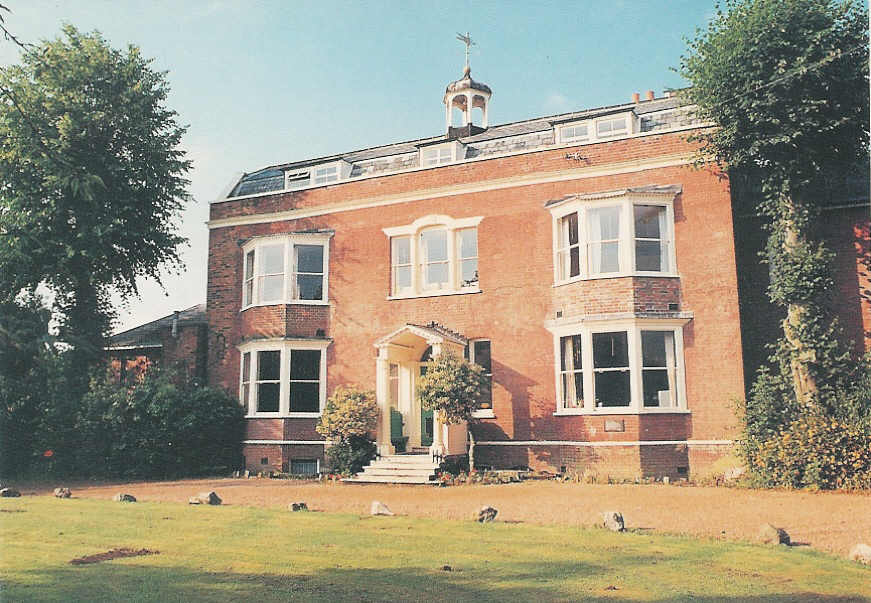
Gad's Hill Place, the death place of Charles Dickens.

Gad's Hill was once notorious as a haunt of robbers. As far back as 1558, there was a ballad entitled The Robbers of Gad's Hill. In William Shakespeare's play Henry IV, Part 1 Falstaff and his cronies organise a highway robbery there.

Gad's Hill Place was once the home of Charles Dickens, who bought it in 1856 for £1,790 and died there in 1870. In its garden once stood a Swiss chalet in which Dickens would compose his works. The chalet is now in the gardens of Eastgate House, Rochester. There are signs at the parish boundaries depicting Dickens' characters.

The house itself is now a private school, originally for girls, but now mixed.

=== Higham Marshes ===
The marshes are an important wetland habitat for many species of wildfowl. There are waymarked walking trails across the marshes.

== Communications ==
- Canal: The Thames and Medway Canal now terminates at Higham. Opened in 1824, the canal used to connect the Thames at Gravesend to the Medway at Strood. It lost the second half of its route c. 1847 when the railway took over the Higham and Strood canal tunnel, but continued to operate from Gravesend to Higham until 1934. It is now disused but as of 2023 there are plans to restore it for leisure use.
- Bicycle: Canal Road which runs beside the canal is used by National Cycle Route 1 (between Gravesend and Medway).
- Railways: Higham railway station is located in Higham (lower), near the entrance to the former canal tunnel. It is served by the North Kent Line. This section of the line was closed throughout 2004 to allow the chalk tunnel to be completely relined after a series of roof falls.
- Roads: The main A226 road between Gravesend and Rochester runs to the south of Higham village.

Other transport issues relating to Higham include a planned new Lower Thames Crossing through Shorne Woods Country Park and a proposal for a new Thames Hub Airport on the nearby Isle of Grain, abandoned in July 2015 on the recommendation of the Airports Commission.

== Demographics ==
At the 2001 UK census, the parish of Higham had 3,471 residents and 1,580 households.

For every 100 females, there were 92.5 males. The age distribution was 5% aged 0–4 years, 13% aged 5–15 years, 8% aged 16–24 years, 24% aged 25–44 years, 31% aged 45–64 years and 19% aged 65 years and over.

== Economy ==
As at the 2001 UK census, 62.3% of Higham residents aged 16–74 were in employment, 2.2% were unemployed and 34.1% were economically inactive. Unemployment was low compared to the national rate of 3.4%. 21% of residents aged 16–74 had a higher education qualification or the equivalent, compared to 20% nationally.

== See also ==
- Listed buildings in Higham, Kent
