= Cobham, Kent =

Coordinates: 51°23′23″N 0°24′03″E

Cobham
- Village and civil parish
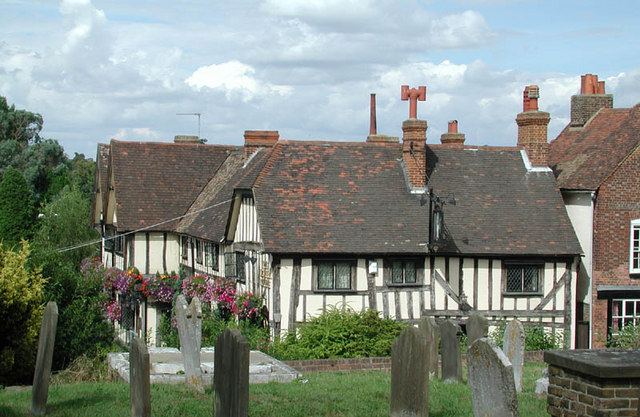
- View of the Leather Bottle pub on The Street from St Mary Magdalene churchyard

- Location within Kent
- Population: 1,469 (2011)
- OS grid reference: TQ671683
- Civil parish: Cobham
- District: Gravesham
- Shire county: Kent
- Region: South East
- Country: England
- Sovereign state: United Kingdom
- Post town: GRAVESEND
- Postcode district: DA12, DA13
- Dialling code: 01474
- Police: Kent
- Fire: Kent
- Ambulance: South East Coast
- UK Parliament: Gravesham

Cobham (/ˈkɒbəm/) is a village and civil parish in the borough of Gravesham in Kent, England. The village is located 6 miles (10 km) south-east of Gravesend, and just south of Watling Street, the Roman road from Dover to London. The parish, which includes the hamlets of Sole Street and Ifield, covers an area of 1,240 hectares (3,100 acres) and had a population of 1,469 at the 2011 census, increasing from 1,328 at the 2001 census.

Since 1970 the village has been in a conservation area which aims to preserve the historic character and appearance of the area.

Cobham is twinned with Baturyn in northern Ukraine. The twinning agreement was signed in a virtual ceremony on 11 March 2025.

== History ==
Cobham parish has had several manors; one of which, Henhurst, was mentioned in the Domesday Book of 1086, and in the Textus Roffensis as being part of the Rochester Bridge charter of c.975, so there has been a settlement in the parish since at least the 10th century. The largest and most notable of the manors is Cobham Hall, which mainly consisted of the manor house, Cobham Hall, and the private park or demesne attached to the house; there is no record of any manorial courts being held before the 16th century, and the lands under rent to the lord of the manor were not significant so at least one court was shared with the other manors within the parish. The parish of Cobham was originally within the ancient hundred of Shamwell. In 1132, Henry I gave Cobham church, which was then an annex of the church at Shorne, to Bermondsey Priory (later to become Bermondsey Abbey).

The Cobham family was established here before the reign of King John (who reigned from 1199).

The lords of the manor of Cobham were Hereditary High Stewards of nearby Gravesend; in 1692 the custom was stopped that Gravesend paid to the lords of Cobham a yearly sum (a pontage) for the use of the landing stage on the River Thames.

== Notable buildings ==
Cobham Hall was the former home of the Earls of Darnley: its gardens were designed by Humphry Repton. The surviving grade I listed manor house is one of the largest and most important houses in Kent. Today the building houses Cobham Hall School, a private boarding school for girls with a co-educational sixth form, which retains 150 acres (61 hectares) of the ancient estate. In the former deer park of Cobham Hall is the Darnley Mausoleum, a pyramid-topped structure built in 1786 as ordered by the will of the 3rd Earl of Darnley.

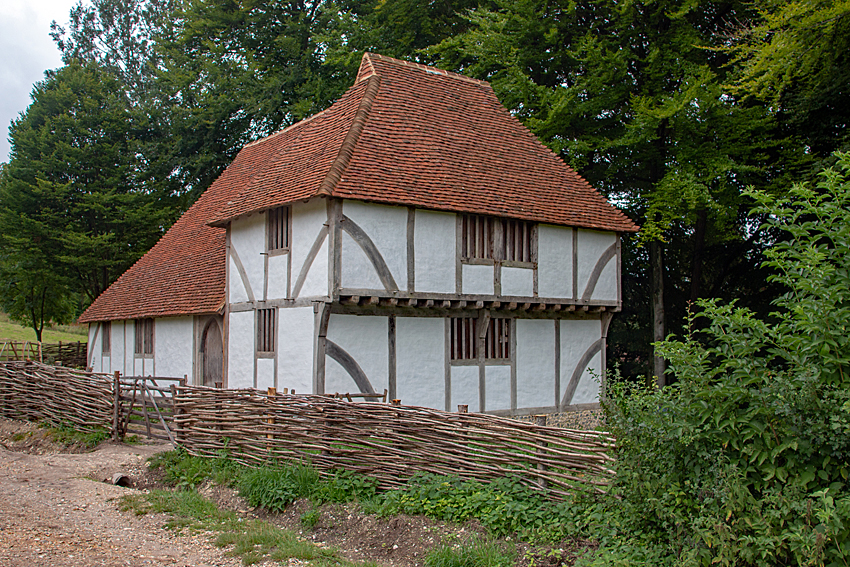
Sole Street medieval hall house

A 15th century hall house in Sole Street, that was threatened with demolition in 1970, has been dismantled and re-erected at the Weald and Downland Living Museum.

The parish church is 13th century and is dedicated to St Mary Magdalene. It contains monumental brasses, of which William Belcher in his Kentish Brasses (1905) stated: "No church in the world possesses such a splendid series as the nineteen brasses in Cobham Church, ranging in date between 1298 and 1529." Thirteen of the brasses belong to the years 1320–1529 and commemorate members of the Brooke and Cobham families. The Brooke Tomb contains alabaster effigies of George Brooke, 9th Baron Cobham (1497–1558) and his wife Ann Bray.

To the immediate south of the church is the building known as Cobham College, now an almshouse, which originally housed the five priests employed by the chantry founded in 1362 by John Cobham, 3rd Baron Cobham.

Another church in the ecclesiastical parish, in Luddesdown, is dedicated to St Peter and St Paul.

Ifield was formerly a separate parish and is now a small hamlet to the south of the A2. The former parish is split between the unparished area of Gravesham and Cobham.

== Schools ==
The Earls of Darnley left Cobham Hall in 1957; since 1962 it has been Cobham Hall School, a private boarding school for girls; it opens to the public on some occasions in the year.

In addition to Cobham Hall School, there is a local primary school, Cobham Primary School. There is also a local pre school, Cobham Community Pre-School.

== Other features ==
There are two areas of open space in the parish: Cobham Park, which includes extensive woodlands; and Jeskyns, a one-time farm of 360 acres (147 ha), which has been turned into a greenspace area by the Forestry Commission.

The village was also linked to its namesake HMS Cobham, a Ham-class minesweeper which was an active Royal Navy vessel between 1953 and 1966.

Cobham is served by Sole Street railway station, on the Chatham Main Line which runs from Gillingham to London Victoria via Bromley South.

== People ==
Cobham has associations with Charles Dickens, who used to walk out to the village: he set part of The Pickwick Papers in The Leather Bottle pub. Other people connected with Cobham include Sir Joseph Williamson, who bought Cobham Hall in 1696, and the insane artist Richard Dadd, who, while recuperating in Cobham, murdered his father in 1843. The Hon Ivo Bligh, the first English cricket captain to attempt to recover The Ashes from Australia, became the 8th Earl of Darnley in 1900, taking over the family home of Cobham Hall. Author Ralph Arnold lived at Meadow House, which is described in his book A Yeoman of Kent (1949).

== See also ==
- Listed buildings in Cobham, Kent
