= Gravesham Borough Council elections =

Local government elections in Kent, England

Gravesham Borough Council elections are held every four years to elect Gravesham Borough Council in Kent, England. Since the last boundary changes in 2023, the council has comprised 39 councillors, representing 17 wards.

== Council composition ==
Composition of the council
Year	Conservative	Labour	Liberal Democrats (Note: Includes totals for the predecessors of the Liberal Democrats, the Liberal Party and SDP (both of which participated in the Alliance).)	Independents & Others	Council control after election
Local government reorganisation; council established (44 seats)
1973	15	28	0	1	Labour
1976	26	17	0	1	Conservative
New ward boundaries (44 seats)
1979	24	19	0	1	Conservative
1983	23	20	1	0	Conservative
1987	22	22	0	0	No overall control
1991	22	22	0	0	No overall control
1995	10	34	0	0	Labour
1999	15	29	0	0	Labour
New ward boundaries (44 seats)
2003	21	23	0	0	Labour
2007	28	16	0	0	Conservative
2011	19	25	0	0	Labour
2015	23	21	0	0	Conservative
2019	18	24	0	2	Labour
New ward boundaries (39 seats)
2023	17	22	0	0	Labour

== Borough result maps ==
2003 results map

2007 results map

2011 results map

2015 results map

2019 results map

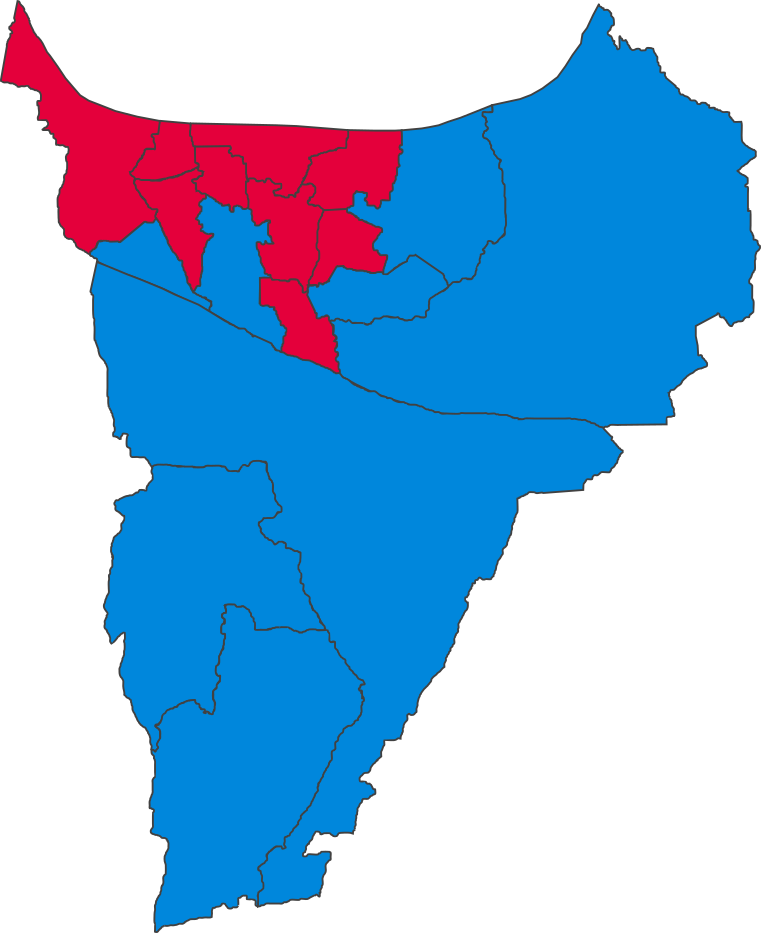
2023 results map

== By-election results ==
=== 1995-1999 ===
Colharbour By-Election 26 June 1997
Party	Candidate	Votes	%	±%
Labour		522	75.4	−4.0
Conservative		86	12.4	+0.2
Liberal Democrats		84	12.1	+3.7
Majority		437	63.0	
Turnout		692	22.8	
Labour hold		Swing		

Painters Ash By-Election 26 June 1997
Party	Candidate	Votes	%	±%
Labour		719	80.0	+4.6
Conservative		152	16.9	−1.7
Liberal Democrats		28	3.1	−2.5
Majority		567	63.1	
Turnout		899	22.8	
Labour hold		Swing		

Riverside By-Election 26 June 1997
Party	Candidate	Votes	%	±%
Labour		541	82.2	−2.9
Conservative		77	11.7	−3.2
Liberal Democrats		40	6.1	+6.1
Majority		464	70.5	
Turnout		658	16.3	
Labour hold		Swing		

Northfleet East By-Election 6 November 1997
Party	Candidate	Votes	%	±%
Labour		807	70.1	−4.4
Conservative		189	16.4	−0.5
Liberal Democrats		155	13.5	+4.9
Majority		618	53.7	
Turnout		1,151		
Labour hold		Swing		

Cobham & Luddesdown By-Election 4 December 1997
Party	Candidate	Votes	%	±%
Conservative		265	72.6	+7.1
Liberal Democrats		51	14.0	+2.7
Labour		49	13.4	−9.8
Majority		214	58.6	
Turnout		365	29.0	
Conservative hold		Swing		

Central By-Election 9 July 1998
Party	Candidate	Votes	%	±%
Labour		675	54.0	−3.6
Conservative		575	46.0	+11.9
Majority		100	8.0	
Turnout		1,250	36.0	
Labour hold		Swing		

=== 2003-2007 ===
Meopham North By-Election 29 January 2004
Party	Candidate	Votes	%	±%
Conservative		643	79.8	+12.5
Labour		105	13.0	−5.3
Liberal Democrats		58	7.2	+7.2
Majority		538	66.8	
Turnout		806	23.4	
Conservative hold		Swing		

Central By-Election 27 December 2006
Party	Candidate	Votes	%	±%
Conservative	Greta Goatley	689	54.6	−0.4
Labour	Lana Aitchison	463	36.7	−8.3
Liberal Democrats	Bruce Parmenter	109	8.6	+8.6
Majority		226	17.9	
Turnout		1,261	28.2	
Conservative hold		Swing		

=== 2007-2011 ===
Meopham North By-Election 21 June 2007 (2)
Party	Candidate	Votes	%	±%
Conservative	Michael Snelling	681		
Conservative	Laura Hryniewicz	662		
Liberal Democrats	James Willis	200		
Liberal Democrats	Gillian McGill	178		
Green	Richard Crawford	104		
Labour	Mary Williams	59		
Labour	Pamela Sales	57		
Monster Raving Loony	Lord Toby Jug	31		
Turnout		1,972	29.0	
Conservative hold		Swing		
Conservative hold		Swing		

Painters Ash By-Election 4 June 2009
Party	Candidate	Votes	%	±%
Labour	Les Howes	626	34.6	−6.4
Conservative	Veronica Craske	623	34.4	−11.6
Liberal Democrats	Ian Stevenson	562	31.0	+18.0
Majority		3	0.2	
Turnout		1,811	41	
Labour gain from Conservative		Swing		

Meopham South and Vigo By-Election 18 March 2010
Party	Candidate	Votes	%	±%
Conservative	Derek Shelbrooke	515	59.5	−4.4
UKIP	Geoffrey Clark	122	14.1	+14.1
Labour	Douglas Christie	114	13.2	−2.5
Liberal Democrats	Ann O'Brien	114	13.2	+13.2
Majority		393	45.4	
Turnout		865	25.3	
Conservative hold		Swing		

=== 2011-2015 ===
Meopham North By-Election 13 October 2011
Party	Candidate	Votes	%	±%
Conservative	John Cubitt	648	47.3	−23.8
UKIP	Geoffrey Clark	462	33.7	+33.7
Liberal Democrats	David Gibson	148	10.8	+10.8
Labour	Andrew Mylett	112	8.2	−20.8
Majority		186	13.6	
Turnout		1,370	38.2	
Conservative hold		Swing		

Meopham North By-Election 20 December 2012
Party	Candidate	Votes	%	±%
Conservative	Julia Burgoyne	419	54.6	−16.5
UKIP	Geoffrey Clark	204	26.6	+26.6
Labour	Douglas Christie	108	14.1	−14.8
Liberal Democrats	Martin Wilson	36	4.7	+4.7
Majority		215	28.0	
Turnout		767		
Conservative hold		Swing		

Painters Ash By-Election 2 May 2013
Party	Candidate	Votes	%	±%
Labour	Lenny Rolles	646	46.3	−10.5
UKIP	Michael Dixon	382	27.4	+27.4
Conservative	Alan Ridgers	367	26.3	−11.8
Majority		264	18.9	
Turnout		1,395		
Labour hold		Swing		

Coldharbour By-Election 22 May 2014
Party	Candidate	Votes	%	±%
Labour	Shane Mochrie-Cox	520	38.5	−24.8
UKIP	Sarinder Duroch	486	35.9	+35.9
Conservative	Bronwen McGarrity	289	21.4	−15.3
Liberal Democrats	Ian Stevenson	35	2.6	+2.6
TUSC	John Michael	22	1.6	+1.6
Majority		34	2.5	
Turnout		1,352		
Labour hold		Swing		

=== 2015-2019 ===
Pelham By-Election 18 August 2016
Party	Candidate	Votes	%	±%
Labour	Jenny Wallace	494	46.2	−4.1
Conservative	Conrad Broadley	325	30.4	−4.6
Liberal Democrats	Sharan Virk	101	9.4	+9.4
UKIP	Gary Harding	91	8.5	+8.5
Green	Marna Gilligan	35	3.3	−11.4
English Democrat	Emma Foreman	24	2.2	+2.2
Majority		169	15.8	
Turnout		1,070		
Labour hold		Swing		

Coldharbour By-Election 4 May 2017
Party	Candidate	Votes	%	±%
Labour	Shane Mochrie-Cox	490	44.3	+7.6
Conservative	Gary Harding	349	31.5	−0.9
UKIP	Tina Brooker	268	24.2	−6.7
Majority		141	15.8	
Turnout		1,107		
Labour hold		Swing		

Painters Ash By-Election 4 May 2017
Party	Candidate	Votes	%	±%
Conservative	Conrad Broadley	873	55.9	+10.1
Labour	Elizabeth Mulheran	561	35.9	−1.4
UKIP	David Beattie	129	8.3	+8.3
Majority		312	20.0	
Turnout		1,563		
Conservative gain from Labour		Swing		

Meopham North By-Election 19 October 2017
Party	Candidate	Votes	%	±%
Conservative	Gary Harding	721	64.0	+6.7
Liberal Democrats	John Death	192	17.0	+17.0
Labour	Doug Christie	155	13.8	−6.9
UKIP	Tina Brooker	59	5.2	−16.8
Majority		529	46.9	
Turnout		1,127		
Conservative hold		Swing		

=== 2019-2023 ===
Westcourt By-Election 17 October 2019
Party	Candidate	Votes	%	±%
Conservative	Helen Ashenden	492	50.1	+20.9
Labour	Lindsay Gordon	314	32.0	−5.5
UKIP	Linda Talbot	116	11.8	−11.1
Green	Marna Gilligan	60	6.1	+6.1
Majority		178	18.1	
Turnout		982		
Conservative gain from Labour		Swing		

Westcourt By-Election 6 May 2021
Party	Candidate	Votes	%	±%
Conservative	Samir Jassal	577	49.4	+20.2
Labour	Karina O'Malley	534	45.8	+8.3
Liberal Democrats	Ukonu Obasi	56	4.8	+4.8
Majority		43	3.7	
Turnout		1,167		
Conservative gain from Labour		Swing		

=== 2023-2027 ===
Rosherville By-Election 1 May 2025
Party	Candidate	Votes	%	±%
Labour	Kim Glendenning	375	43.7	
Reform	John English	257	30.0	
Conservative	Thomas O'Keeffe	133	15.5	
Green	James Eagle	93	10.8	
Majority		118	13.8	
Turnout		858		
Labour hold		Swing		
