= Tan Dhesi =

British politician (born 1976)

Tan Dhesi MP
- ਤਨਮਨਜੀਤ ਸਿੰਘ ਢੇਸੀ
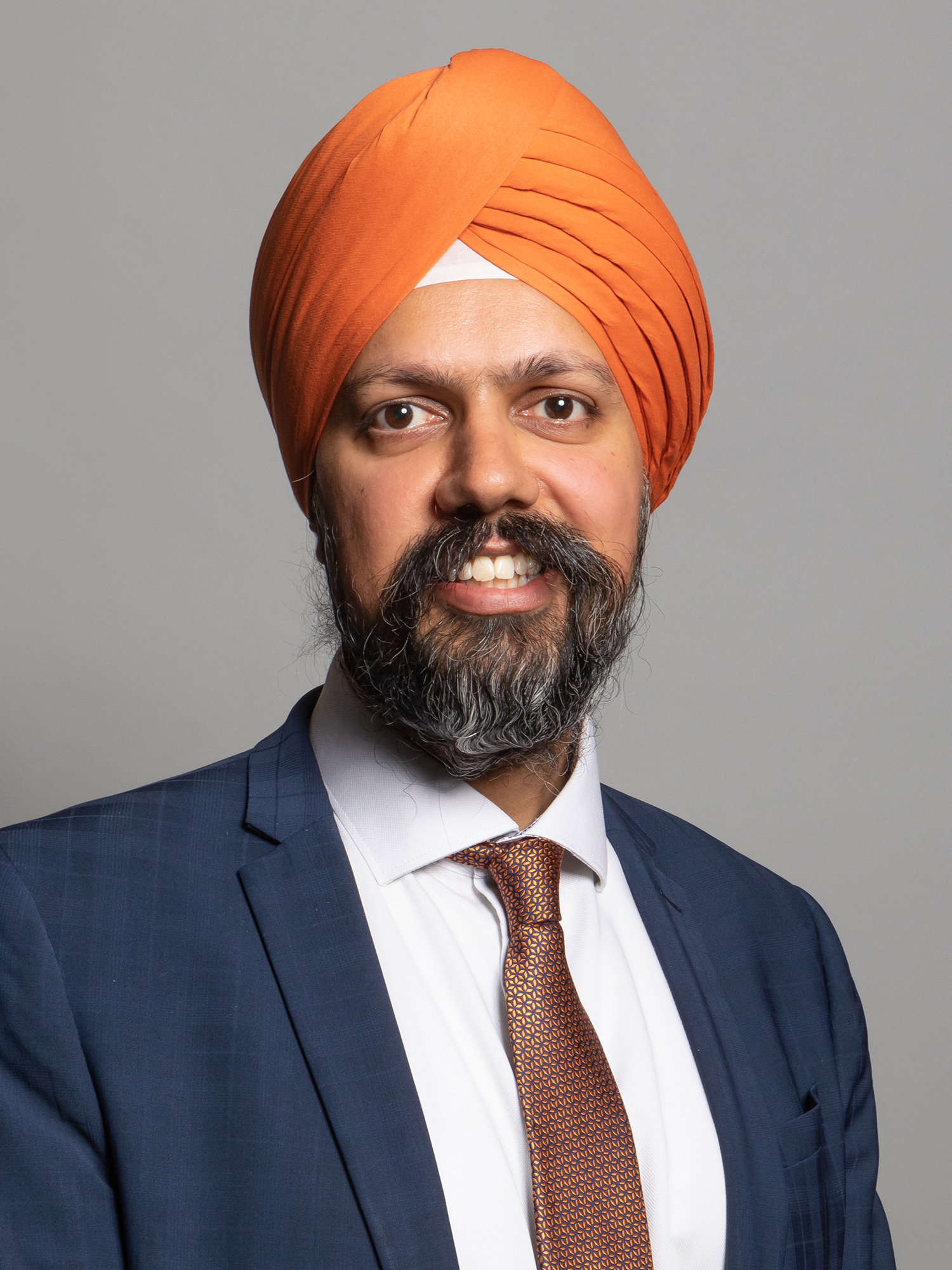
- Official portrait, 2020

Chair of the Defence Committee
- Incumbent
- Assumed office 11 September 2024
- Preceded by: Jeremy Quin

Member of Parliament for Slough
- Incumbent
- Assumed office 8 June 2017
- Preceded by: Fiona Mactaggart
- Majority: 3,647 (8.4%)

Member of Kent County Council for Northfleet and Gravesend West
- In office 4 May 2017 – 12 March 2019
- Succeeded by: John Burden

Member of Gravesham Borough Council for Northfleet North
- In office 3 May 2007 – 7 May 2015

Personal details
- Born: Tanmanjeet Singh Dhesi; 17 August 1978 (age 48) Slough, Berkshire, England
- Party: Labour
- Education: University College London (BSc); Keble College, Oxford (MSc); Fitzwilliam College, Cambridge (MPhil)
- Website: Official website

Tanmanjeet Singh Dhesi (Punjabi: ਤਨਮਨਜੀਤ ਸਿੰਘ ਢੇਸੀ; born 17 August 1978), commonly known as Tan Dhesi, is a British Labour Party politician who has been Member of Parliament (MP) for Slough since 2017.

== Early life and career ==
Tanmanjeet Singh Dhesi was born on 17 August 1978 in Slough to Indian immigrants. He spent his early years in Chalvey. He is the son of Jaspal Singh Dhesi, who runs a construction company in the UK, and the former president of Guru Nanak Darbar Gurdwara, in Gravesend, which is the largest gurdwara in the UK.

Dhesi received most of his primary education in Punjab, before returning to the UK at the age of 9. He has a bachelor's degree in mathematics with Management Studies from University College London, studied Applied Statistics at Keble College, Oxford, and has a Master of Philosophy in the History and Politics of South Asia from Fitzwilliam College, Cambridge.

Following in his father's footsteps, Dhesi worked in construction for much of his life, running his own construction company in Scotland. He served as Director for Dhesi Construction Limited from July 2002 to January 2007, which later became insolvent in 2010 as records show on Companies House, and DGP Logistics PLC from October 2005 to April 2011.

== Local government career ==
Dhesi represented Northfleet North on Gravesham Borough Council from 2007 to 2015, and was Mayor of Gravesham from 2011 to 2012. He was elected to represent Northfleet and Gravesham West on Kent County Council in 2017, serving alongside Lauren Sullivan until his resignation in 2019.

Other voluntary roles whilst serving as a councillor include as school governor at two schools, a trustee with Alzheimer and Dementia Support Services, an advisor and member of Mencap and a member of the Independent Police Advisory Group to Kent Police.

== Parliamentary career ==
At the 2015 general election, Dhesi stood as the Labour candidate in Gravesham, coming second with 30.1% of the vote behind the incumbent Conservative MP Adam Holloway.

Dhesi was elected to Parliament at the snap 2017 general election as MP for Slough with 62.9% of the vote and a majority of 16,998. He became the UK's first turbaned MP. Dhesi gave his maiden speech in the House of Commons in July 2017.

Dhesi served on the Housing, Communities and Local Government Committee from July 2018 until the dissolution of the 57th Parliament of the United Kingdom on 6 November 2019.

At Prime Minister's Questions on 25 September 2019, Dhesi challenged Boris Johnson over a 2018 newspaper column in which Johnson had compared women wearing the burka to letterboxes and bank robbers. Dhesi asked when Johnson would apologise for what he called derogatory and racist remarks, and said that those who had been called names because of their appearance could appreciate the hurt felt by Muslim women. He was applauded by MPs. Johnson declined to apologise. The exchange was reported internationally.

At the 2019 general election, Dhesi was re-elected as MP for Slough with a decreased vote share of 57.6% and a decreased majority of 13,640.

Dhesi was appointed Parliamentary Private Secretary to the Leader of the Opposition, Jeremy Corbyn, in January 2020. He supported Lisa Nandy in the 2020 Labour Party leadership election.

Dhesi briefly served on the Defence Committee from March until May 2020.

=== Shadow Minister for Railways ===
Dhesi was appointed Shadow Minister for Railways after Keir Starmer became Opposition Leader, and held this role until September 2023.

He argued for rail services to be returned to public ownership and for a rolling programme of railway electrification, telling the Railway Industry Association's conference in November 2021 that it had been a "massive error" for the government to scrap its electrification programme, that the industry and rail users had been let down by the absence of a consistent programme of work, and that a Labour government would make a "huge rolling programme" of electrification an immediate priority. In June 2023 he raised a point of order calling on ministers to publish the annual Rail Network Enhancements Pipeline update, which was by then four years overdue. He led Labour's opposition to proposals announced in July 2023 to close or reduce the opening hours of most station ticket offices in England, pressing the government in written questions to disclose its correspondence with the Rail Delivery Group and train operators and to say when ministers had become aware of the proposals. The consultation drew about 680,000 responses and the proposals were withdrawn in October 2023.

In 2021, Dhesi was accused of attempting to hire volunteers for long-term work without pay, with the job being posted on the Working For an MP website. It was claimed that the posting of the job was an administrative error and that Dhesi himself was unaware of its existence, but he declined to comment to the HuffPost to confirm this. Zamzam Ibrahim, vice president of the European Students' Union, commented that “nobody should work for free ... Unpaid labour is far too often masked as volunteering and used to exploit young people.” One Labour staff member said: “It’s a shame really that a Labour MP would try to offer what is quite clearly a proper job role under the guise of ‘volunteering’ ... I’d like to think that MPs from our party would pay people what they are worth....”

He was Shadow Exchequer Secretary to the Treasury from September to November 2023, and Shadow Exports Minister from November 2023 until the July 2024 general election.

During debate on amendments to the King's Speech in November 2023, Dhesi abstained on an SNP amendment calling for an immediate ceasefire in the Gaza war, in line with the Labour whip, and voted for a Labour amendment calling for steps towards an enduring cessation of the violence, the release of hostages and a two-state solution. He said he had openly called for a ceasefire but that neither Israel nor Hamas had agreed to one. He subsequently said he had received death threats over the matter. In February 2024 he said that police had charged one person behind one death threat against him.

At the 2024 general election, Dhesi was again re-elected with a decreased vote share of 33.9% and a decreased majority of 3,647.

=== Chair of the Defence Committee ===
On 11 September 2024, Dhesi was elected Chair of the Defence Select Committee, defeating fellow Labour MP Derek Twigg in a ballot of the whole House. He joined the Joint Committee on the National Security Strategy in December 2024 and the Liaison Committee later the same month.

As chair, Dhesi has overseen inquiries including the Armed Forces Covenant, which reported in April 2025, and Defence in the Grey Zone, published in July 2025. In March 2025 he wrote to the Ministry of Defence pressing for greater transparency on the readiness of UK forces, calling for a formal commitment to an annual classified briefing to the committee and questioning the department's refusal to publish the expected number of frigates and destroyers in the surface fleet. In September 2025 he criticised the pace of defence reform, saying the government seemed to be "trundling along rather than realising the urgency of the moment".

== Personal life ==
In 2012, his mother, Dalwinder Kaur Dhesi, was jailed in India, convicted in 2000 in Punjab of taking part in kidnapping and forcing an abortion on a 19-year-old mother, who later died. The conviction was criticised by many commentators as being politically motivated, and an appeal was filed by Dalwinder in the immediate aftermath of the decision. In 2018, a double bench of the Punjab and Haryana High Court upheld this appeal. All charges against her were subsequently dropped.

Parliament of the United Kingdom
Preceded by Fiona Mactaggart	Member of Parliament for Slough; 2017–present	Incumbent
Preceded by Kate Hollern	Parliamentary Private Secretary to the Leader of the Opposition; 2020	Succeeded by Carolyn Harris
