= 2017 Kent County Council election =

2017 UK local government election

← 2013	4 May 2017	2021 →

All 81 seats to Kent County Council 41 seats needed for a majority
	First party	Second party	Third party
Party	Conservative	Liberal Democrats	Labour
Seats before	44	7	13
Seats won	67	7	5
Seat change	▲23	Steady	▼8
	Fourth party	Fifth party	Sixth party
Party	Green	Swanscombe and Greenhithe Residents Association	UKIP
Seats before	1	1	17
Seats won	1	1	0
Seat change	Steady	Steady	▼17
- Map showing the results of the 2017 Kent County Council elections.
Council control before election
Conservative
Council control after election
Conservative

The 2017 Kent County Council election was held on 4 May 2017 as part of the 2017 local elections in the United Kingdom. All 81 councillors were elected from 72 electoral divisions, each of which returned either one or two county councillors by first-past-the-post voting for a four-year term of office. The Conservative Party retained control. UKIP, previously the second-largest party on the council, lost all their seats.

The Liberal Democrats regained status as the second largest party, which they had been from 2009 to 2013. A notable triumph for Liberal Democrats was Antony Hook winning the Faversham division, which had been considered a "safe" Conservative seat. Antony Hook's campaign increased the Liberal Democrat vote share from 4% in 2013 to a winning 43%. Faversham also saw the largest turnout of any seat. The Labour Party lost seats, including those of their Leader Roger Truelove and previous leaders Gordon Cowan and Dr. Mike Eddy. The Labour vote share also fell but they retained status as 3rd party.

Ward boundary changes took effect at this election after a review of the county by the Local Government Boundary Commission for England. Kent saw a large turnover of councillors. Of the 81 councillors elected in 2017, 39 had not served in the previous council.

== Results summary ==
Kent County Council election, 2017
Party	Seats	Gains	Losses	Net gain/loss	Seats %	Votes %	Votes	+/−
Conservative	67	24	1	+23	82.71	50		▲16%
Liberal Democrats	7	1	1	0	8.64	14		▲5%
Labour	5	0	8	-8	6.17	19		▼4%
Green	1	0	0	0	1.23	5		▲1%
Swanscombe and Greenhithe Residents Association	1	0	0	0	1.23	<1		-
UKIP	0	0	17	-17	0.00	10		▼16%

== Results by district ==
=== Ashford ===
Ashford Central
Party	Candidate	Votes	%	±%
Conservative	Paul Bartlett	2,030	59	▲22
Labour	John Charles Suddards	638	18	▲1
Liberal Democrats	Adrian John Gee-Turner	366	11	▲3
UKIP	Serge Xavier Goldenberg-Kosbab	236	7	▼22
Green	Liz Wright	198	6	▼3
Majority		1,392	41	▲23
Turnout		3,468	27	▲1
Conservative hold		Swing		

Ashford East
Party	Candidate	Votes	%	±%
Liberal Democrats	George Koowaree	1,426	41	▲13
Conservative	Larry William Krause	971	28	▲5
Labour	Martin Chandler	534	15	▲2
UKIP	Garry George Harrison	338	10	▼14
Green	Steven Robert Campkin	191	6	▲2
Majority		455	13	▲9
Turnout		3,460	27	0
Liberal Democrats hold		Swing		

Ashford Rural East
Party	Candidate	Votes	%	±%
Conservative	Clair Bell	2,621	60	▲16
Liberal Democrats	Stuart James Dove	686	16	▲10
Labour	Lynda Suddards	429	10	▼1
Green	Geoff Meaden	350	8	0
UKIP	Pat Purnell	269	6	▼19
Majority		1,935	44	▲25
Turnout		4,355	35	▲2
Conservative hold		Swing		

Ashford Rural South
Party	Candidate	Votes	%	±%
Conservative	Mike Angell	2,405	62	▲21
Labour	Vivien Wheatley	523	14	0
Liberal Democrats	Chris Grayling	455	12	▲7
UKIP	Liah Natasha MacPherson	321	8	▼24
Green	Marilyn Sansom	161	4	▼2
Majority		1,882	48	▲39
Turnout		3,865	29	▲4
Conservative hold		Swing		

Ashford Rural West
Party	Candidate	Votes	%	±%
Conservative	Charlie Simkins	2,780	63	▲29
Liberal Democrats	Clare Hardwick	579	13	▲5
Labour	Sally Ann Gathern	439	10	▲1
UKIP	Norman Taylor	349	8	▼24
Green	Hilary Jones	283	6	▼2
Majority		2,201	50	▲38
Turnout		4,430	31	▲3
Conservative hold		Swing		

Ashford South
Party	Candidate	Votes	%	±%
Labour	Dara Farrell	1,022	32	▼5
Conservative	David Robey	966	30	▲12
UKIP	Ryan Paul MacPherson	727	23	▼7
Liberal Democrats	James Angus Galloway	312	10	▼1
Green	Claire Madeleine Wallington	146	5	▲1
Majority		56	2	▼5
Turnout		3,173	23	0
Labour hold		Swing		

Tenterden
Party	Candidate	Votes	%	±%
Conservative	Mike Hill, OBE	3,383	71	▲20
Liberal Democrats	Steve Bowen	451	9	▲4
UKIP	Eddy Barrows	360	8	▼22
Labour	Alexander Ward	302	6	▼2
Green	Guy Pullen	269	6	▼1
Majority		2,932	62	▲41
Turnout		4,765	36	▲2
Conservative hold		Swing		

=== Canterbury ===
* This constituency boundaries for Canterbury were redrawn and percentage changes should thus be taken as rough approximations, particularly for the previously two-seat Whitstable constituency.

Canterbury City North
Party	Candidate	Votes	%	±%
Conservative	Graham Gibbens	1,665	36	▼7
Labour	Mike Bland	1,198	26	▼1
Liberal Democrats	Andrew Lloyd Palmer	1,137	25	▲7
Green	Henry Stanton	479	10	▲2
UKIP	Richard Henry West	193	4	▼10
Majority		467	10	▼6
Turnout		4,672	37	▲13
Conservative hold		Swing		

Canterbury City South
Party	Candidate	Votes	%	±%
Liberal Democrats	Ida Ann Linfield	1,863	41	▼2
Labour	Simon Nicholas Warley	1,087	24	▲9
Conservative	Joe Egerton	1,071	24	▲9
Green	Pat Marsh	313	7	▼5
UKIP	Carole Anne Riley	189	4	▼11
Majority		776	17	▼11
Turnout		4,523	33	▲5
Liberal Democrats hold		Swing		

Canterbury North
Party	Candidate	Votes	%	±%
Conservative	John Simmonds, MBE	2,321	55	▲17
Labour	Ben Hickman	700	16	▼2
Liberal Democrats	David Norman Prevett	600	16	▲2
Green	Andrew Peter Goatly	287	7	▼1
UKIP	Trevor William Dockwray	240	6	▼16
Majority		1,621	39	▲23
Turnout		4,247	33	▲10
Conservative hold		Swing		

Canterbury South
Party	Candidate	Votes	%	±%
Conservative	Michael Northey	2,151	44	▲11
Liberal Democrats	Michael John Sole	1,788	37	▲9
Labour	Jean Elizabeth Butcher	655	13	0
Green	Frankie-Rose Taylor	285	6	▼1
Majority		363	7	▲2
Turnout		4,879	40	▲9
Conservative hold		Swing		

Herne Bay East
Party	Candidate	Votes	%	±%
Conservative	Andrew Cook	2,399	55	▲40
Labour	Jon Beer	893	20	▲12
UKIP	Nicholas Bond	580	13	▼4
Liberal Democrats	Ann Margaret Anderson	506	12	▲9
Majority		1,506	35	n/a
Turnout		4,387	31	▲3
Conservative gain from UKIP		Swing		

Herne Village & Sturry
Party	Candidate	Votes	%	±%
Conservative	Alan Marsh	2,637	60	▲19
Labour	Lynn Faux-Bowyer	769	18	▲1
Liberal Democrats	Graham Dudley Wood	403	9	▲4
UKIP	Mick O'Brien	391	9	▼22
Green	Nathan James Geoffrey Tough	189	4	▼2
Majority		1,868	42	▲32
Turnout		4,389	29	▲2
Conservative hold		Swing		

Whitstable East & Herne Bay West
Party	Candidate	Votes	%	±%
Conservative	Ian Thomas	2,111	48	▲31
Labour	Naomi Ruth Smith	757	17	▲6
Liberal Democrats	Mike Northern	674	15	▲12
UKIP	David Hirst	649	15	▼1
Green	Sarah Stanton	178	4	0
Majority		1,354	31	▲30
Turnout		4,369	32	0
Conservative gain from UKIP		Swing		

Whitstable West
Party	Candidate	Votes	%	±%
Conservative	Mark Dance	2,225	42	▲25
Labour	Rachel Natalie Goodwin	1,736	33	▲22
Liberal Democrats	David John Mummery	557	11	▲8
UKIP	Richard Peter Riley	414	8	▼8
Green	Alex Stevens	364	7	▲3
Majority		489	9	▲8
Turnout		5,296	36	▲4
Conservative hold		Swing		

=== Dartford ===
Dartford East
Party	Candidate	Votes	%	±%
Conservative	Penny Cole	1,914	62	▲25
Labour	Catherine Mary Stafford	696	22	▼13
Liberal Democrats	Ashley MacTaggart	497	16	new
Majority		1,218	40	▲38
Turnout		3,007	23	▼3
Conservative hold		Swing		

Dartford North East
Party	Candidate	Votes	%	±%
Conservative	Dave Butler	1,611	42	▲6
Labour	Tom Maddison	1,523	40	▼2
UKIP	Ben Robert Fryer	442	12	▼6
Green	Andrew Danny Blatchford	163	4	new
BNP	Ronald David Ball	61	2	▼2
Majority		88	2	n/a
Turnout		3,800	28	▲2
Conservative gain from Labour		Swing		

Dartford Rural
Party	Candidate	Votes	%	±%
Conservative	Jeremy Kite, MBE	3,013	70	▲17
Labour	Mandy Garford	680	16	▼2
UKIP	Ivan Paul Burch	439	10	▼16
Liberal Democrats	Edward Temple Waite	165	4	new
Majority		2,333	54	▲27
Turnout		4,297	33	▲6
Conservative hold		Swing		

Dartford West
Party	Candidate	Votes	%	±%
Conservative	Jan Ozog	2,077	49	▲8
Labour	Sacha Navindra Gosine	1,355	32	▲4
UKIP	Jim Moore	442	10	▼19
Liberal Democrats	Ashley Francis Edward Wassall	317	7	new
BNP	Michael Godfrey Cope	36	1	new
Majority		722	17	▲5
Turnout		4,227	31	▲2
Conservative hold		Swing		

Swanscombe & Greenhithe
Party	Candidate	Votes	%	±%
Residents	Peter Harman	1,093	43	▲17
Conservative	Keith Martin Kelly	634	25	▼1
Labour	Claire Pearce	634	25	▲2
UKIP	Linda Janet Moore	208	8	▼13
Majority		459	18	▲17
Turnout		2,569	24	▲3
Residents hold		Swing		

Wilmington
Party	Candidate	Votes	%	±%
Conservative	Ann Allen, MBE	2,610	63	▲14
Labour	Joshua Jones	841	20	▼3
UKIP	Roger Errol Doucy	497	12	▼12
Liberal Democrats	Caroline Watkinson	195	5	new
Majority		1,769	43	▲18
Turnout		4,143	31	▲3
Conservative hold		Swing		

=== Dover ===
Deal & Walmer
Party	Candidate	Votes	%	±%
Conservative	Trevor Antony Bond	3,969	47	▲28
Conservative	Derek Murphy	3,544	42	▲23
Labour	Mike Eddy	2,860	34	▲13
Labour	Eileen Rowbotham	2,751	33	▲12
Liberal Democrats	Will Darlington	779	9	▲5
UKIP	Sylvia Angela Hanael	699	8	▼7
Liberal Democrats	John Charles Trickey	610	7	▲3
UKIP	Graham Francis Lane	497	6	▼9
Green	John Lonsdale	491	6	new
Independent	Christopher James David Tough	179	2	new
Majority		684	8	n/a
Turnout		8,434	35	▲1
Conservative gain from Labour		Swing		
Conservative gain from Labour		Swing		

Dover North
Party	Candidate	Votes	%	±%
Conservative	Steve Manion	2,074	54	▲9
Labour	Charles Francis Woodgate	1,173	30	▼6
Green	Nick Fox	311	8	new
UKIP	Tim Turner	303	8	new
Majority		901	24	▲15
Turnout		3,861	34	▼2
Conservative hold		Swing		

Dover Town
Party	Candidate	Votes	%	±%
Conservative	Pauline Margaret Beresford	2,832	41	▲25
Conservative	Nigel Collor	2,681	39	▲25
Labour	Pam Brivio	2,436	35	▲12
Labour	Gordon Cowan	1,989	29	▲8
UKIP	Ben John Glayzer	979	14	▼4
UKIP	Georgette Rapley	845	12	▼6
Green	Beccy Sawbridge	443	6	new
Liberal Democrats	Adrian John Briggs	394	6	▲3
Liberal Democrats	Carolyn Rose Hughes	365	5	▲2
Majority		245	4	n/a
Turnout		6,877	27	▲24
Conservative gain from Labour		Swing		
Conservative gain from Labour		Swing		

Dover West
Party	Candidate	Votes	%	±%
Conservative	Geoff Lymer	2,589	61	▲23
Labour	Miriam Wood	766	18	0
UKIP	Peter John McDermott	421	10	▼26
Liberal Democrats	Jim Caple	299	7	▲2
Green	Sarah Gleave	182	4	new
Majority		1,823	43	▲41
Turnout		4,257	34	▼1
Conservative hold		Swing		

Sandwich
Party	Candidate	Votes	%	±%
Conservative	Sue Chandler	2,868	61	▲16
Labour	David Pestell	831	18	▼3
Liberal Democrats	Wendy Ann Scott	442	9	▲1
UKIP	Lesley Anne Ede	287	6	▼19
Green	Aidan John Shanks	251	5	new
Majority		2,037	43	▲23
Turnout		4,684	36	▲2
Conservative hold		Swing		

=== Folkestone & Hythe ===
* All of the Folkestone & Hythe constituencies bar two were reorganised, therefore percentage changes have only been given for Elham Valley and Romney Marsh.

Cheriton, Sandgate & Hythe East
Party	Candidate	Votes	%	±%
Conservative	Rory Cassian Love	2,172	42	n/a
Liberal Democrats	Tim Prater	1,217	24	n/a
Green	Ross Carter	856	17	n/a
Labour	Paul Richard Bingham	506	10	n/a
UKIP	Neil Lawrence Jones	398	8	n/a
Majority		955	18	n/a
Turnout		5,147	36	n/a
Conservative gain from UKIP		Swing		

Elham Valley
Party	Candidate	Votes	%	±%
Conservative	Susan Carey	2,706	54	▲10
UKIP	Stephen Terence Priestley	639	13	▼21
Green	Karen Jane White	616	12	new
Liberal Democrats	Ross Clark	515	10	▲3
Labour	Aaron Simon Roche	513	10	▲5
Majority		2,069	41	▲31
Turnout		4,989	36	▲1
Conservative hold		Swing		

Folkestone East
Party	Candidate	Votes	%	±%
Conservative	Dick Pascoe	1,153	36	n/a
Labour	Arran Harvey	831	26	n/a
UKIP	Mary Lawes	660	20	n/a
Liberal Democrats	Lynne Beaumont	542	17	n/a
Socialist (GB)	Max Lionel Hess	48	1	n/a
Majority		322	10	n/a
Turnout		3,234	25	n/a
Conservative gain from UKIP		Swing		

Folkestone West
Party	Candidate	Votes	%	±%
Conservative	David Drury Monk	1,834	44	n/a
Labour	Laura Frances Davison	841	20	n/a
Liberal Democrats	Gary Fuller	521	13	n/a
UKIP	Stephen Jardine	412	10	n/a
Green	Rebecca Tamsin Shoob	325	8	n/a
Independent	Bryan Anthony Rylands	191	5	n/a
Socialist (GB)	Andy Thomas	23	1	n/a
Majority		993	24	n/a
Turnout		4,150	31	n/a
Conservative gain from UKIP		Swing		

Hythe West
Party	Candidate	Votes	%	±%
Green	Martin Whybrow	2,234	41	n/a
Conservative	David Lionel Godwin Owen	2,044	38	n/a
UKIP	Ian Barry Meyers	493	9	n/a
Labour	Christopher John Deane	340	6	n/a
Liberal Democrats	Neil Matthews	515	5	n/a
Majority		190	3	n/a
Turnout		5,393	42	n/a
Green hold		Swing		

Romney Marsh
Party	Candidate	Votes	%	±%
Conservative	Tony Hills	2,218	42	▲3
UKIP	Susie Govett	1,077	20	▼19
Independent	David Wimble	1,061	20	n/a
Labour	Nicola Helen Deane	361	7	▼6
Liberal Democrats	Ted Last	335	6	▲2
Green	Andrew John South	215	4	▼2
Majority		1,141	22	n/a
Turnout		5,268	36	▲4
Conservative gain from UKIP		Swing		

=== Gravesham ===
Gravesend East
Party	Candidate	Votes	%	±%
Conservative	Diane Marsh	3,708	46	▲29
Conservative	Alan Michael Ridgers	3,332	42	▲28
Labour	Colin Caller	2,784	35	▲12
Labour	Lyn Milner	2,730	34	▲12
UKIP	Tina Brooker	1,182	15	0
Green	Martin James Wilson	385	5	new
Liberal Democrats	James Martin Willis	378	5	▲3
Green	Marna Eilish Gilligan	310	4	new
Liberal Democrats	Mason Cole	267	3	▲1
Majority		548	7	n/a
Turnout		7,987	26	▼3
Conservative gain from Labour		Swing		
Conservative gain from Labour		Swing		

Gravesham Rural
Party	Candidate	Votes	%	±%
Conservative	Bryan Sweetland	3,975	71	▲8
Labour	Doug Christie	740	13	▼6
Liberal Democrats	John Richard Death	440	8	new
UKIP	Ryan Andrew Waters	407	7	new
Majority		3,235	58	▲14
Turnout		5,562	36	▲5
Conservative hold		Swing		

Northfleet & Gravesend West
Party	Candidate	Votes	%	±%
Labour	Tan Dhesi	3,786	44	▲16
Labour	Lauren Sullivan	3,621	42	▲17
Conservative	Conrad Broadley	3,390	39	▲24
Conservative	Gary John Harding	3,149	36	▲24
UKIP	David Shaun Beattie	883	10	▼5
UKIP	Emmanuel Korede Feyisetan	649	7	▼8
Liberal Democrats	Sharan Virk	386	4	new
Green	Erin Claire Johnson	374	4	new
Liberal Democrats	Mark John Powell Marsh	365	4	new
Green	Ruiha Gayle Smalley	218	3	new
Majority		231	3	▼7
Turnout		8,682	30	▲3
Labour hold		Swing		
Labour hold		Swing		

=== Maidstone ===
Maidstone Central
Party	Candidate	Votes	%	±%
Liberal Democrats	Dan Daley	3,540	42	▲22
Liberal Democrats	Rob Bird	3,140	38	▲20
Conservative	Alan Bartlett	2,746	33	▲22
Conservative	Graham Alexander Jarvis	2,246	27	▲17
Labour	Paul Harper	1,319	16	▲9
UKIP	Pamela Elizabeth Watts	647	8	▼3
Green	Stuart Robert Jeffery	470	6	▲2
Green	Donna Louise Greenan	444	5	▲2
Majority		394	5	▼2
Turnout		8,367	30	▲2
Liberal Democrats hold		Swing		
Liberal Democrats hold		Swing		

Maidstone North East
Party	Candidate	Votes	%	±%
Liberal Democrats	Ian Chittenden	2,232	50	▲8
Conservative	Cheryl Janette Taylor Maggio	1,411	32	▲12
Labour	Joanna Burns	332	7	▼2
UKIP	Nick Goddard	310	7	▲17
Green	Belinda Anne Bassett	148	3	▼2
Majority		821	18	0
Turnout		4,433	32	▲3
Liberal Democrats hold		Swing		

Maidstone Rural East
Party	Candidate	Votes	%	±%
Conservative	Shellina Prendergast	3,482	70	▲1
UKIP	Mark John McGiffin	472	9	new
Liberal Democrats	Paul John Wilby	458	9	▲4
Labour	Malcolm McKay	397	8	▼6
Green	Derek Roy Eagle	201	4	▼7
Majority		3,010	61	▲6
Turnout		5,010	36	▲6
Conservative hold		Swing		

Maidstone Rural North
Party	Candidate	Votes	%	±%
Conservative	Paul Carter, CBE	3,042	66	▲20
Liberal Democrats	Martin Ashley Richard Cox	530	11	▲4
Labour	Tim Licence	441	10	▼1
UKIP	Gordon Newton	408	9	▼22
Green	Ciaran Dominic Oliver	197	4	▼1
Majority		2,512	55	▲42
Turnout		4,618	33	▲4
Conservative hold		Swing		

Maidstone Rural South
Party	Candidate	Votes	%	±%
Conservative	Eric Hotson	2,912	68	▲10
Liberal Democrats	Derek John Mortimer	610	14	▼12
Labour	Stella Marlyn Randall	398	9	new
Green	Caroline Jessel	356	8	▼8
Majority		2,302	54	▲12
Turnout		4,276	34	▲4
Conservative hold		Swing		

Maidstone Rural West
Party	Candidate	Votes	%	±%
Conservative	Paulina Stockell	2,351	49	▲6
Liberal Democrats	Brian Mortimer	1,716	36	▲26
UKIP	Martin Peter Lack	348	7	▼24
Labour	Richard John Coates	259	5	▼5
Green	Geoffrey Wilkinson	140	3	▼3
Majority		635	13	▲1
Turnout		4,814	39	▲8
Conservative hold		Swing		

Maidstone South
Party	Candidate	Votes	%	±%
Conservative	Paul Charles Cooper	1,872	42	▲13
Liberal Democrats	Brian Clark	1,561	35	▼12
UKIP	Michael Hogg	418	9	new
Labour	Patrick Frederick Coates	371	8	▼7
Green	Ian McDonald	101	2	▼6
Independent	Yolande Ann Kenward	82	2	new
Independent	Gary Butler	46	1	new
Majority		311	7	n/a
Turnout		4,451	33	▲5
Conservative gain from Liberal Democrats		Swing		

Maidstone South East
Party	Candidate	Votes	%	±%
Conservative	Gary Cooke	1,496	52	▲8
UKIP	Eddie Powell	543	19	new
Labour	Dan Wilkinson	496	17	▼15
Liberal Democrats	David Sandru Naghi	247	9	▼2
Green	Steven Cheeseman	107	4	▼8
Majority		953	33	▲21
Turnout		2,888	24	▲4
Conservative hold		Swing		

=== Sevenoaks ===
Sevenoaks North & Darent Valley
Party	Candidate	Votes	%	±%
Conservative	Roger Gough	3,289	64	▲15
Labour	Theo Michael	502	10	▼9
Liberal Democrats	Krish Shanmuganathan	476	9	▲4
Green	Philip Dodd	463	9	new
UKIP	Graham Russell Cushway	374	7	▼19
Majority		2,787	54	▲31
Turnout		5,104	32	▲5
Conservative hold		Swing		

Sevenoaks Rural North East
Party	Candidate	Votes	%	±%
Conservative	David Brazier	3,371	78	▲27
Labour	Lucas Jacob Pearce	539	12	▲2
Green	Mark Richard Lindop	435	10	new
Majority		2,832	66	▲40
Turnout		4,345	30	▲4
Conservative hold		Swing		

Sevenoaks Rural South
Party	Candidate	Votes	%	±%
Conservative	Peter William Ariel Lake	2,749	63	▲17
Liberal Democrats	Richard Giles Streatfeild	878	20	▲3
Labour	James Fredrick Charles Parish	354	8	▼2
Green	Amelie Elisabeth Boleyn	280	6	new
Independent	Alan Dharmendra Damodaran	72	2	new
Majority		1,871	43	▲23
Turnout		4,333	34	▲6
Conservative hold		Swing		

Sevenoaks Town
Party	Candidate	Votes	%	±%
Conservative	Margaret Crabtree	2,483	48	▼8
Liberal Democrats	Tony Clayton	2,046	40	▲25
Labour	Michael James Hogg	346	7	▼3
UKIP	Gerald Michael O'Brien	293	6	▼9
Majority		437	8	▼33
Turnout		5,168	35	▲5
Conservative hold		Swing		

Sevenoaks West
Party	Candidate	Votes	%	±%
Conservative	Nick Chard	3,025	63	▲12
Liberal Democrats	Merilyn Canet	719	15	▲8
Labour	Neil Malcolm Proudfoot	432	9	▲1
UKIP	Chris Stewart	301	6	▼21
Green	Sarah Jane White	298	6	▼1
Majority		2,306	48	▲24
Turnout		4,775	32	▲5
Conservative hold		Swing		

Swanley
Party	Candidate	Votes	%	±%
Conservative	Michael Horwood	2,411	65	▲24
Labour	Angela George	886	24	▼8
Liberal Democrats	John Owen Jones	213	6	new
Green	Phil Levy	118	3	0
BNP	Clifford Le May	94	3	▲2
Majority		1,525	41	▲32
Turnout		3,722	25	▲3
Conservative hold		Swing		

=== Swale ===
There are five single-member constituencies and one multi-member constituency within the District of Swale, which elect a total of seven councillors to Kent County Council. The electoral map of Swale was redrawn as a result of boundary changes which saw the old Swale Central multi-member ward split to create Sittingbourne North and Sittingbourne South, both single member divisions. Sheerness and Sheppey Divisions were merged to create the new Multi-member Sheppey Division. Swale District includes the Division of Faversham which saw Liberal Democrat Antony Hook winning the Faversham division, which had been considered a "safe" Conservative seat. Antony Hook's campaign increased the Liberal Democrat vote share from 4% in 2013 to a winning 43%. Faversham also saw the largest turnout of any seat. Boundary changes meant that Below are the results:

Faversham
Party	Candidate	Votes	%	±%
Liberal Democrats	Antony Hook	2,714	43	▲39
Conservative	David Henry Simmons	2218	35	▼10
Labour	Trevor Raymond Payne	863	14	▼17
Green	Peter Hutchinson	261	4	new
UKIP	Christine Margaret Palmer	243	4	▼16
Majority		496	8	n/a
Turnout		6,299	43	▲13
Liberal Democrats gain from Conservative		Swing		

Sheppey
Party	Candidate	Votes	%	±%
Conservative	Andy Booth	3,093	43	▲18
Conservative	Ken Pugh	3,009	42	▲16
Labour	Angela Harrison	1,774	25	▼15
UKIP	Richard William Darby	1,485	21	▼14
Labour	Gill Smith	1,291	18	▼4
UKIP	Mini Nissanga	998	14	▼30
Independent	Elliott Jayes	593	8	n/a
Monster Raving Loony	Mad Mike Young	339	5	▲3
Green	Richard John Bishop	337	5	new
Green	Dru Hopkins	201	3	new
Liberal Democrats	David John Spurling	175	2	0
Independent	Mike Walters	144	2	new
Majority		1,235	17	n/a
Turnout		7,194	24	▼3
Conservative gain from UKIP		Swing		
Conservative gain from Labour		Swing		

Sittingbourne North
Party	Candidate	Votes	%	±%
Conservative	Sue Gent	1,526	41	▲23
Labour	Ghlin Whelan	1,195	32	▲17
UKIP	Jim Hall	639	17	▼1
Liberal Democrats	Tony Clark	330	9	▲7
Green	Huw Jones	72	2	new
Majority		331	9	n/a
Turnout		3,762	24	▼5
Conservative gain from Labour		Swing		

Sittingbourne South
Party	Candidate	Votes	%	±%
Conservative	John Wright	1,972	42	▲27
Labour	Roger Truelove	1,955	41	▲23
UKIP	Lee Burgess	527	11	▼6
Liberal Democrats	Gareth Dominic Edmund Arnold	188	4	▲2
Green	Jonathan Grace	76	2	new
Majority		17	1	n/a
Turnout		4,718	33	▲4
Conservative gain from UKIP		Swing		

Swale East
Party	Candidate	Votes	%	±%
Conservative	Andrew Bowles	2,597	54	▲8
UKIP	Richard Frank Palmer	717	15	▼12
Labour	Frances Rehal	624	13	▼7
Liberal Democrats	Eddie Thomas	500	10	▲3
Green	Alistair Gould	367	8	new
Majority		1,880	39	▲20
Turnout		4,805	37	▲9
Conservative hold		Swing		

Swale West
Party	Candidate	Votes	%	±%
Conservative	Mike Whiting	2,159	43	▲11
UKIP	Mike Baldock	2040	40	▼11
Labour	Tony Winkless	495	10	▼2
Liberal Democrats	Marc Wilson	228	5	▲1
Green	Tim Valentine	120	2	new
Majority		119	3	n/a
Turnout		5,042	32	▲2
Conservative gain from UKIP		Swing		

=== Thanet ===
Birchington & Rural
Party	Candidate	Votes	%	±%
Conservative	Emma Dawson	4,529	54	▲22
Conservative	Ken Gregory	4,103	49	▲17
Labour	Lynda Diana Robinson	1,455	17	▲3
UKIP	Suzanne Brimm	1,418	17	▼30
UKIP	Peter Evans	1,141	14	▼33
Labour	Seamus Yener	1,115	13	▼4
Liberal Democrats	Angie Curwen	1,076	13	▲6
Liberal Democrats	Martyn Harry Pennington	819	10	▲3
Green	Natasha Anne Ransom	499	6	new
Majority		684	32	n/a
Turnout		8,385	32	▼2
Conservative gain from UKIP		Swing		
Conservative gain from UKIP		Swing		

* Previously the one seat Birchington and Villages division.

Broadstairs
Party	Candidate	Votes	%	±%
Conservative	Rosalind Binks	3,155	58	▲43
Labour	Stuart James McCann	1,172	21	▲8
UKIP	Zita Wiltshire	580	11	▼9
Liberal Democrats	William Robert Hewer	379	7	▲5
Green	Terry MacDonald	196	4	▲1
Majority		1,983	37	n/a
Turnout		5,482	38	▲5
Conservative gain from UKIP		Swing		

* Previously a two seat division.

Cliftonville
Party	Candidate	Votes	%	±%
Conservative	Lesley Game	2,679	55	▲43
Labour	Aram Ahmed Rawf	965	20	▲2
UKIP	Chris Wells	648	13	▼5
Liberal Democrats	Matthew David Brown	246	5	▲3
Independent	David Reginald Davidge	163	3	new
Green	Mike White	129	3	▲1
Majority		1,714	35	n/a
Turnout		4,830	35	▲8
Conservative gain from UKIP		Swing		

Margate
Party	Candidate	Votes	%	±%
Labour	Barry Harvey Lewis	1,268	44	▲24
Conservative	Kerry Jane Boyd	1,187	42	▲16
Liberal Democrats	John Finnegan	169	6	▲4
Green	Bernard Charles Kirkham	133	5	new
Independent	Pip Rees	96	3	new
Majority		81	2	n/a
Turnout		3,485	24	▼5
Labour gain from UKIP		Swing		

* Previously Margate West, as well as part of the Cliftonville division.

Ramsgate
Party	Candidate	Votes	%	±%
Labour	Karen Constantine	3,200	34	▲18
Conservative	Paul Joseph Messenger	3,168	34	▲24
Labour	Raushan Ara	3,145	34	▲19
Conservative	Marc Rattigan	2,945	32	▲23
UKIP	Trevor Shonk	1,846	20	▼2
UKIP	Lin Fairbrass	1,746	19	▼1
Independent	Ian Driver	505	5	▲1
Independent	Colin Grostate	485	5	new
Liberal Democrats	Jordan Luke Williams	479	5	▲4
Liberal Democrats	Catherine Frances Hewer	472	5	▲4
Independent	Stefan John Connor Costen	181	2	new
Majority		23	0.2	n/a
Turnout		9,333	30	▼1
Labour gain from UKIP		Swing		
Conservative gain from UKIP		Swing		

=== Tonbridge and Malling ===
There are five single-member constituencies and one multi-member constituency within the District of Tonbridge and Malling, which elect a total of seven councillors to Kent County Council. Below are the results:

Malling Central
Party	Candidate	Votes	%	±%
Liberal Democrats	Trudy Dean	2,576	57	▲2
Conservative	Dougie Dick	1,535	34	▲14
Labour	Sarah Rosalind Palmer	239	5	▼2
UKIP	Helen Jean Brown	182	4	▼12
Majority		1,041	23	▼12
Turnout		4,532	36	▲2
Liberal Democrats hold		Swing		

Malling North
Party	Candidate	Votes	%	±%
Conservative	Sarah Hohler	2,512	65	▲19
Labour	Wayne John Mallard	763	20	▼7
Liberal Democrats	Richard Stephen Selkirk	411	11	▲7
Green	Howard Porter	158	4	▲1
Majority		1,749	45	▲26
Turnout		3,844	28	▼3
Conservative hold		Swing		

Malling North East
Party	Candidate	Votes	%	±%
Conservative	Peter Homewood	3,208	69	▲23
Liberal Democrats	Darren Kent Nicholls	620	13	▲5
Labour	Lola Ayeni	594	13	▼3
Green	Steve Jackson	217	5	▲2
Majority		2,588	56	▲37
Turnout		4,639	32	▲3
Conservative hold		Swing		

Malling Rural East
Party	Candidate	Votes	%	±%
Conservative	Matthew Balfour	3,230	74	▲26
Liberal Democrats	Nicola Marie Gibb	663	15	▲10
Green	Jill Darby	450	10	▲6
Majority		2,567	59	▲43
Turnout		4,343	31	▲1
Conservative hold		Swing		

Malling West
Party	Candidate	Votes	%	±%
Conservative	Harry Rayner	3,208	69	▲14
Liberal Democrats	Nicholas George Stapleton	460	10	▲5
Labour	Kathleen Maria Garlick	336	7	▼2
Green	Richard Paul Mountford	312	7	▲2
UKIP	Mike Jerrom	311	7	▼17
Majority		2,748	59	▲28
Turnout		4,627	36	▲6
Conservative hold		Swing		

Tonbridge
Party	Candidate	Votes	%	±%
Conservative	Michael Douglas Payne	4,647	52	▲28
Conservative	Richard Long, TD	4,464	50	▲28
Liberal Democrats	Frances Annabel Hoskins	1,413	16	▲12
Labour	Mary Geraldine Ann Arigho	1,209	14	▲6
Liberal Democrats	Garry Christopher Bridge	1,146	13	▲9
Green	April Elizabeth Clark	1,028	12	▲7
Labour	Sacha Marten	1,009	11	▲4
Green	Mark Antony James Hood	923	10	▲6
UKIP	David John Allen	766	9	▼3
UKIP	Colin Robert Tarver Hussey	723	8	▼2
Majority		3,051	34	▲24
Turnout		8,874	33	▲5
Conservative hold		Swing		
Conservative hold		Swing		

=== Tunbridge Wells ===
Cranbrook
Party	Candidate	Votes	%	±%
Conservative	Seán Holden	2,932	60	▲19
Independent	Nancy Warne	988	20	new
Liberal Democrats	Clare Katherine Bishop	647	13	▼5
Labour	Ian Patrick Carvell	306	6	▼2
Majority		1,944	40	▲27
Turnout		4,873	35	▲2
Conservative hold		Swing		

Tunbridge Wells East
Party	Candidate	Votes	%	±%
Conservative	Paul Vincent Barrington-King	1,953	41	▲18
Liberal Democrats	Allen David Lear	912	19	▼2
Independent	Terry Cload	850	18	▲3
Labour	Tim Rich	567	12	▲4
UKIP	Chris Hoare	429	9	▼2
Majority		1,041	22	n/a
Turnout		4,711	35	▲1
Conservative gain from UKIP		Swing		

Tunbridge Wells North
Party	Candidate	Votes	%	±%
Conservative	Peter Oakford	2,017	42	▲7
Labour	Martin Roland Betts	1,248	26	▲9
Liberal Democrats	Marguerita Morton	1,172	25	▲8
UKIP	William O'Shea	215	4	▼20
Green	Anthony Hoskin	128	3	▼4
Majority		769	16	▲5
Turnout		4,780	35	▲6
Conservative hold		Swing		

Tunbridge Wells Rural
Party	Candidate	Votes	%	±%
Conservative	Sarah Hamilton	2,928	65	▲22
Labour	Raymond Peter Moon	600	13	0
Liberal Democrats	Tom Deacon	475	11	▲3
UKIP	Colin Nicholson	266	6	▼30
Green	Trevor Tyrone Bisdee	219	5	new
Majority		2,328	52	▲45
Turnout		4,488	35	▲4
Conservative hold		Swing		

Tunbridge Wells South
Party	Candidate	Votes	%	±%
Conservative	Catherine Rankin	2,716	53	▲7
Liberal Democrats	Andrew Thomas Hickey	888	17	▲4
Labour	Lorna Blackmore	573	11	▼4
Women's Equality	Céline Thomas	474	9	new
UKIP	Naz Mian	219	4	▼22
Green	John Anthony Hurst	215	4	new
Majority		1,828	36	▲16
Turnout		5,085	36	▲6
Conservative hold		Swing		

Tunbridge Wells West
Party	Candidate	Votes	%	±%
Conservative	James McInroy	2,720	55	▲14
Liberal Democrats	Alan James Bullion	884	18	▲10
Labour	Alex Britcher	718	15	▲4
Green	David Charles Holton	350	7	0
UKIP	Russell Robert Bishop	259	5	▼28
Majority		1,836	37	▲29
Turnout		4,931	35	▲3
Conservative hold		Swing		
