= Slough (constituency) =

UK Parliament constituency (since 1983)

Coordinates: 51.52°N 0.61°W

- Borough constituency for the House of Commons
- Boundaries since 2024
- Boundary of Slough in South East England
- County: Berkshire
- Electorate: 75,287 (2023)
- Major settlements: Langley; Slough

Current constituency
- Created: 1983
- Member of Parliament: Tan Dhesi (Labour)
- Seats: One
- Created from: Eton & Slough; Beaconsfield

Slough is a constituency (Note: A borough constituency (for the purposes of election expenses and type of returning officer)) represented in the House of Commons of the UK Parliament by Tan Dhesi, a member of the Labour Party, since the 2017 UK general election. (Note: As with all constituencies, the constituency elects one Member of Parliament (MP) by the first past the post system of election at least every five years.)

The seat is one of five Labour seats from a total of nine seats in Berkshire.

== Constituency profile ==
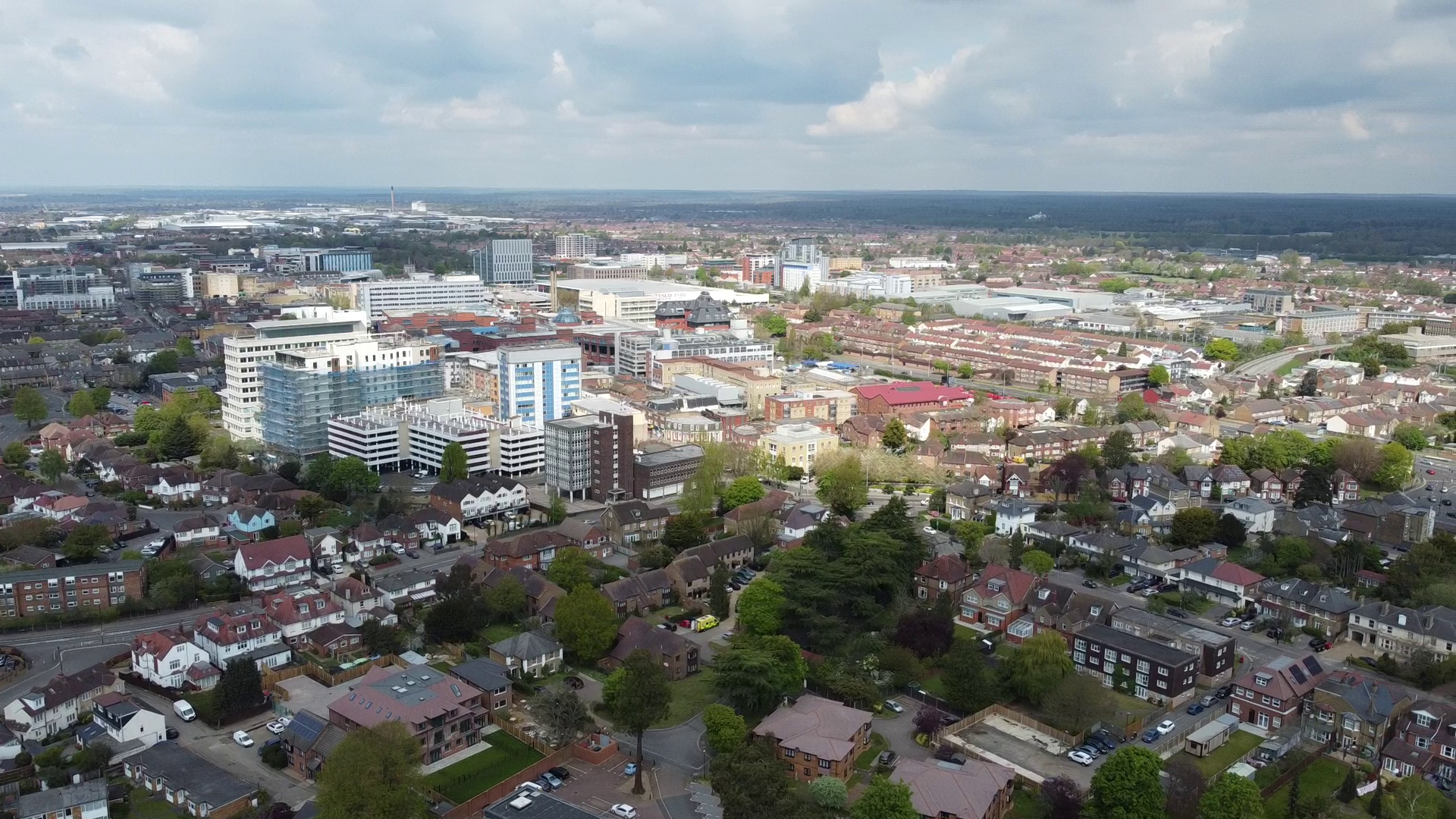
Slough

Slough is a constituency in Berkshire in South East England. It covers most of the town and borough of Slough, with the exception of Colnbrook, Poyle and the southern half of Langley.

Slough is a large, industrial town that is sometimes considered part of the London commuter belt; the town is located around 20 miles (32 km) west of the centre of the capital. The town developed around Slough Trading Estate, one of the largest industrial estates in Europe. The estate was established in 1920 and the town grew rapidly in population, attracting workers from across the UK and abroad. Slough forms part of the high-tech M4 corridor and is close to Heathrow Airport, the busiest airport in Europe. Most of the town has high levels of deprivation, although the eastern suburbs are more affluent. Most residents live in dense flats or terraces; house prices are generally similar to the UK average but lower than the rest of South East England.

Slough has a large population of middle-aged adults with families and a very low proportion of retirees. Residents have average rates of income, low levels of homeownership, and the child poverty rate is in line with the overall UK rate. They have average levels of education and a high proportion work in the retail, manufacturing and technology sectors. The percentage of residents claiming unemployment benefits is high.

Slough is an ethnically diverse constituency. Asians were the largest ethnic group at the 2021 census; they made up 48% of the population, roughly evenly-split between people of Indian and Pakistani origin. Slough has one of the UK's largest Sikh communities, who made up 11% of residents in 2021. White people were 35% of the population, around one-third of whom were of non-British origin including large Polish and Romanian populations. Black people made up 8% of residents.

At the local borough council, most of the constituency is represented by the Labour Party, with some Conservatives elected in the outer suburbs. An estimated 54% of voters in Slough supported leaving the European Union in the 2016 referendum, marginally higher than the UK-wide figure of 52%.

== History ==
From 1945 to 1983 most of the area presently covered by this seat was in the Eton and Slough constituency, which was a marginal seat usually held by the Labour Party. The Labour MP from 1950 to 1964 was the veteran politician Fenner Brockway, a radical progressive social democrat, who led in writing on pacifism, prison reform, anti-colonialism and anti-discrimination, was editor of the Labour Leader, attended talks by the Fabian Society and had joined the fledgling Independent Labour Party in 1907. It was also held by Labour government minister Joan Lester from 1966 until its abolition in 1983.

The Slough constituency was created from the bulk of the Eton and Slough seat for the 1983 election, when it was won by the Conservatives. Fiona Mactaggart captured it for Labour at the landslide election of 1997 and have retained since then, with Tan Dhesi succeeding Mactaggart in 2017. It is now considered to be a safe Labour seat.

== Boundaries and boundary changes ==
Map of 2010–2024 boundaries

=== 1983–1997 ===
The Borough of Slough.

Created from the bulk of the abolished constituency of Eton and Slough, which contributed 88.2% of the constituency. The remaining northern slice came from the safe Conservative constituency of Beaconsfield.

=== 1997–2010 ===
The Borough of Slough wards of Baylis, Britwell, Central, Chalvey, Cippenham, Farnham, Haymill, Kedermister, Langley St Mary's, Stoke, Upton, and Wexham Lea.

The Foxborough ward was transferred to Windsor.

=== 2010–2024 ===
The Borough of Slough wards of Baylis and Stoke, Britwell, Central, Chalvey, Cippenham Green, Cippenham Meadows, Farnham, Foxborough, Haymill, Langley Kedermister, Langley St Mary's, Upton, and Wexham Lea.

The Foxborough ward was transferred back in, but the Colnbrook with Poyle ward, which had been created in 1998 within the Borough of Slough as a result of minor boundary changes involving the counties of Berkshire, Buckinghamshire and Surrey, was retained in Windsor.

=== 2024–present ===
Under the 2023 Periodic Review of Westminster constituencies which came into effect for 2024 general election, the composition of the constituency was reduced to bring its electorate within the permitted range by transferring back the Foxborough ward to Windsor, along with the Langley Kedermister ward (as they existed at 1 December 2020).

Following a local government boundary review which came into effect in May 2023, the constituency now comprises the following wards of the Borough of Slough from the 2024 general election:

- Baylis & Salt Hill; Britwell; Chalvey; Cippenham Green; Cippenham Manor; Cippenham Village; Elliman; Farnham; Haymill; Herschel Park; Langley Marish (small part); Langley Meads; Langley St Mary's (most); Manor Park & Stoke; Northborough & Lynch Hill Valley; Slough Central; Upton; Upton Lea; Wexham Court.

== Members of Parliament ==
Eton & Slough prior to 1983

Election	Member	Party
1983	John Watts	Conservative
1997	Fiona Mactaggart	Labour
2017	Tanmanjeet Singh Dhesi	Labour

== Elections ==
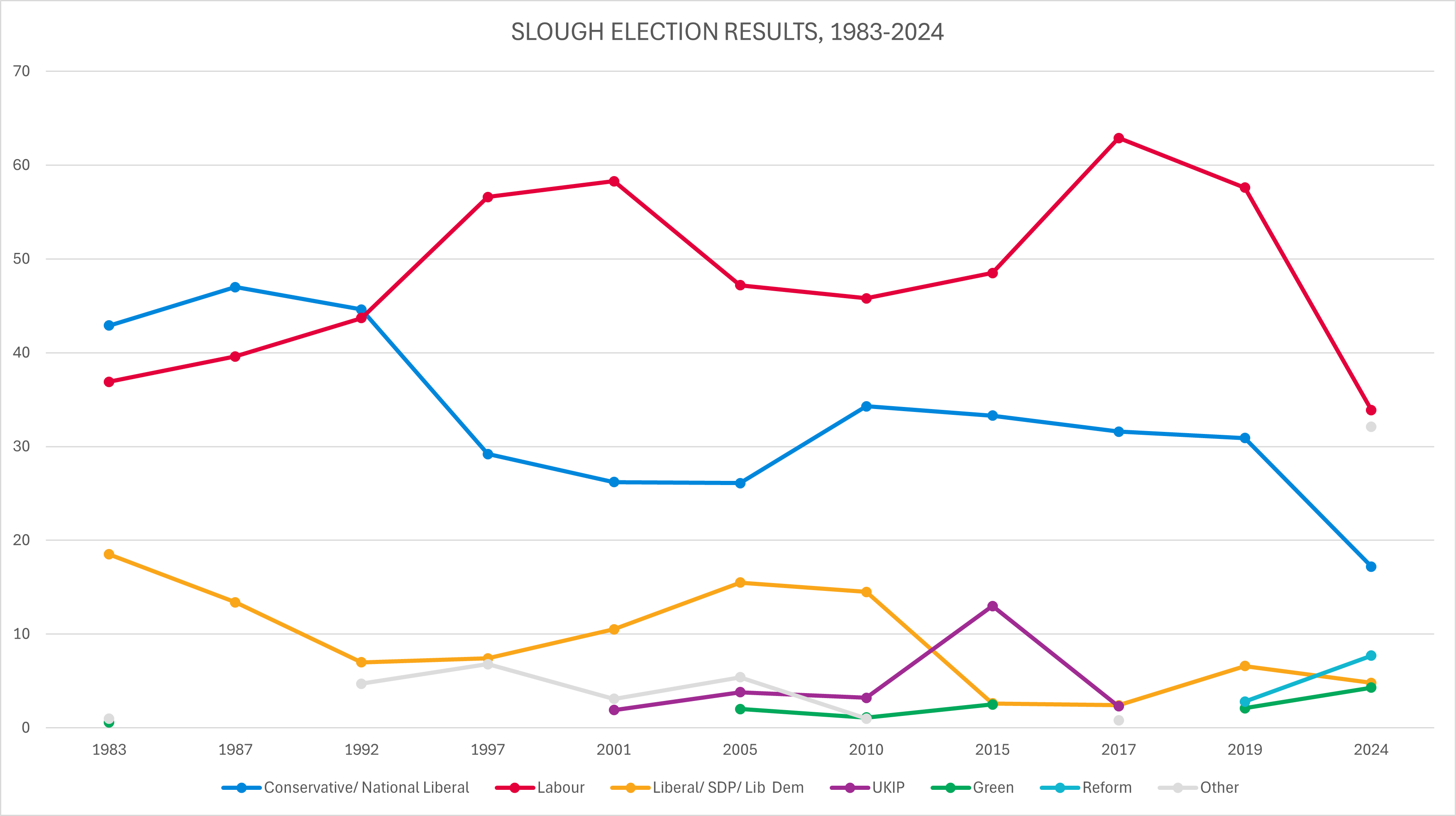
Election results 1983-2024

=== Elections in the 2020s ===
General election 2024: Slough
Party	Candidate	Votes	%	±%
Labour	Tan Dhesi	14,666	33.9	▼24.9
Ind. Network	Azhar Chohan	11,019	25.5	N/A
Conservative	Moni Nanda	7,457	17.2	▼12.3
Reform	Robin Jackson	3,352	7.7	▲4.9
Liberal Democrats	Chelsea Whyte	2,060	4.8	▼2.0
Green	Julian Edmonds	1,873	4.3	▲2.2
Workers Party	Adnan Shabbir	1,105	2.6	N/A
Independent	Chandra Muvvala	995	2.3	N/A
Independent	Diana Coad	402	0.9	N/A
Independent	Jaswinder Singh	204	0.5	N/A
Heritage	Nick Smith	145	0.3	N/A
Majority		3,647	8.4	▼18.3
Turnout		43,278	53.1	▼7.4
Registered electors		81,512		
Labour hold				

=== Elections in the 2010s ===
2019 notional result
Party	Vote	%
Labour	26,790	58.8
Conservative	13,443	29.5
Liberal Democrats	3,099	6.8
Brexit Party	1,280	2.8
Green	948	2.1
Turnout	45,560	60.5
Electorate	75,287	

General election 2019: Slough
Party	Candidate	Votes	%	±%
Labour	Tan Dhesi	29,421	57.6	–5.3
Conservative	Kanwal Toor Gill	15,781	30.9	–0.7
Liberal Democrats	Aaron Chahal	3,357	6.6	+4.2
Brexit Party	Delphine Grey-Fisk	1,432	2.8	N/A
Green	Julian Edmonds	1,047	2.1	N/A
Majority		13,640	26.7	–4.6
Turnout		51,038	58.2	–7.2
Labour hold		Swing	–2.3	

General election 2017: Slough
Party	Candidate	Votes	%	±%
Labour	Tan Dhesi	34,170	62.9	+14.4
Conservative	Mark Vivis	17,172	31.6	–1.7
Liberal Democrats	Tom McCann	1,308	2.4	–0.2
UKIP	Karen Perez	1,228	2.3	–10.7
Independent	Paul Janik	417	0.8	N/A
Majority		16,998	31.3	+16.1
Turnout		54,295	65.4	+9.5
Labour hold		Swing	+8.0	

General election 2015: Slough
Party	Candidate	Votes	%	±%
Labour	Fiona Mactaggart	23,421	48.5	+2.7
Conservative	Gurcharan Singh	16,085	33.3	–1.0
UKIP	Diana Coad	6,274	13.0	+9.8
Liberal Democrats	Tom McCann	1,275	2.6	–11.9
Green	Julian Edmonds	1,220	2.5	+1.4
Majority		7,336	15.2	+3.6
Turnout		48,275	55.9	–6.0
Labour hold		Swing	+1.8	

General election 2010: Slough
Party	Candidate	Votes	%	±%
Labour	Fiona Mactaggart	21,884	45.8	–0.4
Conservative	Diana Coad	16,361	34.3	+7.9
Liberal Democrats	Chris Tucker	6,943	14.5	–2.2
UKIP	Peter Mason-Apps	1,517	3.2	–0.5
Green	Miriam Kennet	542	1.1	–0.9
Christian	Sunil Chaudhary	495	1.0	N/A
Majority		5,523	11.5	–8.3
Turnout		47,742	61.9	+8.1
Labour hold		Swing		

=== Elections in the 2000s ===
General election 2005: Slough
Party	Candidate	Votes	%	±%
Labour	Fiona Mactaggart	17,517	47.2	–11.1
Conservative	Sheila Gunn	9,666	26.1	–0.1
Liberal Democrats	Thomas McCann	5,739	15.5	+5.0
Respect	Ajaz Khan	1,632	4.4	N/A
UKIP	Geoff Howard	1,415	3.8	+1.9
Green	David Wood	759	2.0	N/A
Independent	Paul Janik	367	1.0	N/A
Majority		7,851	21.1	–11.0
Turnout		37,095	50.5	–2.9
Labour hold		Swing	–5.5	

General election 2001: Slough
Party	Candidate	Votes	%	±%
Labour	Fiona Mactaggart	22,718	58.3	+1.7
Conservative	Diana Coad	10,210	26.2	–3.0
Liberal Democrats	Keith Kerr	4,109	10.5	+3.1
Independent	Tony Haines	859	2.2	N/A
UKIP	John Lane	738	1.9	N/A
Independent	Choudry Nazir	364	0.9	N/A
Majority		12,508	32.1	+4.7
Turnout		38,998	53.4	–14.5
Labour hold		Swing		

=== Elections in the 1990s ===
General election 1997: Slough
Party	Candidate	Votes	%	±%
Labour	Fiona Mactaggart	27,029	56.6	+12.9
Conservative	Peta Buscombe	13,958	29.2	−15.4
Liberal Democrats	Chris Bushill	3,509	7.4	+0.4
Liberal	Anne Bradshaw	1,835	3.8	+1.3
Referendum	Terence J. Sharkey	1,124	2.4	N/A
Independent	Paul P. Whitmore	277	0.6	N/A
Majority		13,071	27.4	N/A
Turnout		47,732	67.9	−10.3
Labour gain from Conservative		Swing	+14.2	

General election 1992: Slough
Party	Candidate	Votes	%	±%
Conservative	John Watts	25,793	44.6	−2.4
Labour	Eddie Lopez	25,279	43.7	+4.1
Liberal Democrats	Peter Mapp	4,041	7.0	−6.4
Liberal	John Clark	1,426	2.5	N/A
Independent Labour	Declan Alford	699	1.2	N/A
National Front	Andy Carmichael	290	0.5	N/A
Natural Law	Martin Creese	153	0.3	N/A
Independent	Elizabeth Smith	134	0.2	N/A
Majority		514	0.9	−6.5
Turnout		57,815	78.0	+2.1
Conservative hold		Swing	−3.3	

=== Elections in the 1980s ===
General election 1987: Slough
Party	Candidate	Votes	%	±%
Conservative	John Watts	26,166	47.0	+4.1
Labour	Eddie Lopez	22,076	39.6	+2.7
SDP	Michael Goldstone	7,490	13.4	−5.1
Majority		4,090	7.4	+1.4
Turnout		55,732	75.9	+4.4
Conservative hold		Swing		

General election 1983: Slough
Party	Candidate	Votes	%	±%
Conservative	John Watts	22,064	42.9	+4.3
Labour	Joan Lestor	18,958	36.9	−6.7
SDP	Nicholas Bosanquet	9,519	18.5	+7.2
National Front	Graham John	528	1.0	
Ecology	Ian Flindall	325	0.6	
Majority		3,106	6.0	
Turnout		51,394	71.5	
Conservative win (new seat)				

== See also ==
- List of parliamentary constituencies in Berkshire
- List of parliamentary constituencies in the South East England (region)
- Slough Borough Council includes historical information about wards and local elections

== Sources ==
- British Parliamentary Constituencies, A Statistical Compendium, by Ivor Crewe and Anthony Fox (Faber and Faber 1984).
- Official list of candidates nominated 2010 Slough Borough Council website accessed 21 April 2010
