= 2011 Gravesham Borough Council election =

- 5 May 2011

All 44 seats in the Gravesham Borough Council 23 seats needed for a majority
| | First party | Second party |
|---|---|---|
| Party | Labour | Conservative |
| Last election | 16 seats, 35.5% | 28 seats, 54.8% |
| Seats before | 17^{†} | 27^{†} |
| Seats won | 25 | 19 |
| Seat change | ▲8 | ▼8 |
| Popular vote | 13,549 | 15,151 |
| Percentage | 45.1% | 50.4% |
| Swing | ▲9.6% | ▼4.4% |
- Map of the results of the 2011 Gravesham council election. Labour in red and Conservatives in blue.^{†} Labour gained a seat from the Conservatives in a by-election in 2009
Council control before election
Conservative
Council control after election
Labour

The 2011 Gravesham Borough Council election took place on 5 May 2011 to elect members of Gravesham Borough Council in Kent, England. The whole council was up for election and the Labour Party gained overall control of the council from the Conservative Party.

== Background ==
Before the election the Conservatives had run the council since the 2007 election when they won 26 seats, compared to 16 for Labour. However Labour gained a seat back at a by-election in June 2009 in Painters Ash ward.

During the campaign the national Labour leader Ed Miliband came to Gravesham twice, while the Conservative Prime Minister David Cameron met party activists, along with visits by other senior figures from the two parties. Apart from the Conservative and Labour parties there were also candidates from the United Kingdom Independence Party in 5 wards and the Liberal Democrats in 3 wards.

== Election result ==
Labour gained 8 seats to take control of the council from the Conservatives. Labour made gains in Central, Painters Ash, Singlewell and Westcourt wards to hold 25 seats, compared to 19 for the Conservatives.

Following the election Ed Miliband came back to Gravesham and said "Our victory here is both a sign of our progress and a symbol of our task ahead." Both the local Conservative and Labour leaders on the council, Mike Snelling and John Burden, put the results down to the cuts being made by the national Conservative led government.

Gravesham local election result 2011
| Party | Seats | Gains | Losses | Net gain/loss | Seats % | Votes % | Votes | +/− |
|---|---|---|---|---|---|---|---|---|
| Labour | 25 | 8 | 0 | +8 | 56.8 | 45.1 | 13,549 | +9.6% |
| Conservative | 19 | 0 | 8 | -8 | 43.2 | 50.4 | 15,151 | -4.4% |
| UKIP | 0 | 0 | 0 | 0 | 0 | 1.3 | 953 | +1.3% |
| Liberal Democrats | 0 | 0 | 0 | 0 | 0 | 1.4 | 416 | -4.4% |

== Ward results ==
Central (3)
| Party | Candidate | Votes | % | ±% |
|---|---|---|---|---|
| Labour | Gurdip Bungar | 1,079 | | |
| Conservative | Greta Goatley | 1,073 | | |
| Labour | Derek Sales | 1,060 | | |
| Labour | Andrew Mylett | 1,031 | | |
| Conservative | Bronwen McGarrity | 1,019 | | |
| Conservative | Samir Jassal | 971 | | |
| Liberal Democrats | Matt Vincent | 207 | | |
| Liberal Democrats | Gill McGill | 150 | | |
| Liberal Democrats | Rob McGill | 121 | | |
| Turnout | | 6,711 | 52 | +9 |
| Labour gain from Conservative | | Swing | | |
| Conservative hold | | Swing | | |
| Labour gain from Conservative | | Swing | | |

Chalk
| Party | Candidate | Votes | % | ±% |
|---|---|---|---|---|
| Conservative | Leslie Hills | 562 | 68.3 | −8.3 |
| Labour | Alexander Wallace | 209 | 25.4 | +2.0 |
| UKIP | Quentin Williamson | 52 | 6.3 | +6.3 |
| Majority | | 353 | 42.9 | −10.3 |
| Turnout | | 823 | 48 | +10 |
| Conservative hold | | Swing | | |

Coldharbour (2)
| Party | Candidate | Votes | % | ±% |
|---|---|---|---|---|
| Labour | Sue Howes | 735 | | |
| Labour | Rosemary Leadley | 675 | | |
| Conservative | Carol Fisher | 429 | | |
| Conservative | Heather Frost | 421 | | |
| Turnout | | 2,260 | 37 | +6 |
| Labour hold | | Swing | | |
| Labour hold | | Swing | | |

Higham (2)
| Party | Candidate | Votes | % | ±% |
|---|---|---|---|---|
| Conservative | Leslie Pearton | 1,021 | | |
| Conservative | Harold Craske | 871 | | |
| Labour | Eileen Rice | 429 | | |
| Labour | Jenny Wallace | 428 | | |
| Turnout | | 2,749 | 47 | +6 |
| Conservative hold | | Swing | | |
| Conservative hold | | Swing | | |

Istead Rise (2)
| Party | Candidate | Votes | % | ±% |
|---|---|---|---|---|
| Conservative | David Turner | 1,067 | | |
| Conservative | Bryan Sweetland | 1,034 | | |
| Labour | Jenny Beardsall | 294 | | |
| Labour | Pam Sales | 236 | | |
| Turnout | | 2,631 | 50 | +6 |
| Conservative hold | | Swing | | |
| Conservative hold | | Swing | | |

Meopham North (2)
| Party | Candidate | Votes | % | ±% |
|---|---|---|---|---|
| Conservative | Mike Snelling | 1,220 | | |
| Conservative | Laura Hryniewicz | 1,051 | | |
| Labour | Douglas Christie | 497 | | |
| Labour | Brian Newell | 389 | | |
| Turnout | | 3,157 | 51 | +22 |
| Conservative hold | | Swing | | |
| Conservative hold | | Swing | | |

Meopham South and Vigo (2)
| Party | Candidate | Votes | % | ±% |
|---|---|---|---|---|
| Conservative | Lesley Boycott | 1,098 | | |
| Conservative | Derek Shelbrooke | 1,042 | | |
| Labour | Mary Williams | 266 | | |
| Labour | Dick Target | 265 | | |
| Turnout | | 2,671 | 42 | +6 |
| Conservative hold | | Swing | | |
| Conservative hold | | Swing | | |

Northfleet North (3)
| Party | Candidate | Votes | % | ±% |
|---|---|---|---|---|
| Labour | Andrea Webb | 1,106 | | |
| Labour | Tanmanjeet Dhesi | 1,103 | | |
| Labour | Peter Rayner | 1,101 | | |
| Conservative | Clarice Masterson | 508 | | |
| Conservative | Eileen Tuff | 489 | | |
| Conservative | David Garside | 466 | | |
| UKIP | Geoffrey Clark | 218 | | |
| Turnout | | 4,911 | 37 | +5 |
| Labour hold | | Swing | | |
| Labour hold | | Swing | | |
| Labour hold | | Swing | | |

Northfleet South (3)
| Party | Candidate | Votes | % | ±% |
|---|---|---|---|---|
| Labour | John Loughlin | 1,105 | | |
| Labour | John Burden | 1,095 | | |
| Labour | Narinder-Jit Thandi | 1,061 | | |
| Conservative | Julia Burgoyne | 552 | | |
| Conservative | Teresa Sweetland | 527 | | |
| Conservative | Brenda Pritchard | 520 | | |
| UKIP | Dave Thomas | 206 | | |
| Turnout | | 5,066 | 38 | +7 |
| Labour hold | | Swing | | |
| Labour hold | | Swing | | |
| Labour hold | | Swing | | |

Painters Ash (3)
| Party | Candidate | Votes | % | ±% |
|---|---|---|---|---|
| Labour | Colin Dennis | 1,235 | | |
| Labour | Les Howes | 1,214 | | |
| Labour | Caroline Shelton | 1,128 | | |
| Conservative | Karen Hurdle | 830 | | |
| Conservative | Diane Marsh | 809 | | |
| Conservative | Alan Ridgers | 803 | | |
| Liberal Democrats | Ian Stevenson | 111 | | |
| Liberal Democrats | Carrie Abraham | 93 | | |
| Liberal Democrats | Martin Wilson | 69 | | |
| Turnout | | 6,292 | 50 | +7 |
| Labour gain from Conservative | | Swing | | |
| Labour hold | | Swing | | |
| Labour gain from Conservative | | Swing | | |

Pelham (3)
| Party | Candidate | Votes | % | ±% |
|---|---|---|---|---|
| Labour | Brian Sangha | 1,327 | | |
| Labour | Makhan Singh | 1,300 | | |
| Labour | Jane Cribbon | 1,270 | | |
| Conservative | Jack Bearman | 766 | | |
| Conservative | Jasmail Dosanjh | 739 | | |
| Conservative | Peter Harris | 706 | | |
| UKIP | Simon Johnston | 235 | | |
| Turnout | | 6,343 | 45 | +6 |
| Labour hold | | Swing | | |
| Labour hold | | Swing | | |
| Labour hold | | Swing | | |

Riverside (3)
| Party | Candidate | Votes | % | ±% |
|---|---|---|---|---|
| Labour | Lyn Milner | 1,156 | | |
| Labour | Lee Croxton | 1,143 | | |
| Labour | Dick Smith | 1,135 | | |
| Conservative | Helen Skellorn | 520 | | |
| Conservative | Chaz Sidhu | 444 | | |
| Conservative | Amrik Jandoo | 442 | | |
| Turnout | | 4,840 | 35 | +6 |
| Labour hold | | Swing | | |
| Labour hold | | Swing | | |
| Labour hold | | Swing | | |

Riverview (2)
| Party | Candidate | Votes | % | ±% |
|---|---|---|---|---|
| Conservative | William Lambert | 902 | | |
| Conservative | David Hurley | 800 | | |
| Labour | Michael Coulter | 483 | | |
| Labour | Jason MCCrossan | 420 | | |
| Turnout | | 2,605 | 42 | +6 |
| Conservative hold | | Swing | | |
| Conservative hold | | Swing | | |

Shorne, Cobham & Luddesdown (2)
| Party | Candidate | Votes | % | ±% |
|---|---|---|---|---|
| Conservative | Alex Moore | 1,271 | | |
| Conservative | Robin Theobald | 1,234 | | |
| Labour | Ernie Brook | 315 | | |
| Labour | Maureen Newell | 284 | | |
| Turnout | | 3,104 | 51 | +3 |
| Conservative hold | | Swing | | |
| Conservative hold | | Swing | | |

Singlewell (3)
| Party | Candidate | Votes | % | ±% |
|---|---|---|---|---|
| Labour | Brian Francis | 1,074 | | |
| Labour | Rob Halpin | 1,000 | | |
| Labour | Jean Averibou | 994 | | |
| Conservative | Graeme Biggs | 806 | | |
| Conservative | John Cubitt | 788 | | |
| Conservative | Conrad Broadley | 776 | | |
| Turnout | | 5,438 | 39 | +7 |
| Labour gain from Conservative | | Swing | | |
| Labour gain from Conservative | | Swing | | |
| Labour gain from Conservative | | Swing | | |

Westcourt (3)
| Party | Candidate | Votes | % | ±% |
|---|---|---|---|---|
| Labour | Colin Caller | 1,056 | | |
| Labour | John Caller | 1,038 | | |
| Labour | Val Ashenden | 1,012 | | |
| Conservative | Sean Long | 654 | | |
| Conservative | Philip Hales | 651 | | |
| Conservative | Sandra Garside | 617 | | |
| Liberal Democrats | Bob Moreton | 98 | | |
| Liberal Democrats | James Willis | 69 | | |
| Turnout | | 5,195 | 39 | +10 |
| Labour hold | | Swing | | |
| Labour hold | | Swing | | |
| Labour gain from Conservative | | Swing | | |

Whitehill (2)
| Party | Candidate | Votes | % | ±% |
|---|---|---|---|---|
| Conservative | Glen Handley | 734 | | |
| Conservative | Senja Compton | 732 | | |
| Labour | Surinder Dale | 523 | | |
| Labour | Brigitte Steer | 513 | | |
| Turnout | | 2,502 | 43 | +3 |
| Conservative hold | | Swing | | |
| Conservative hold | | Swing | | |

Woodlands (3)
| Party | Candidate | Votes | % | ±% |
|---|---|---|---|---|
| Conservative | Sara Langdale | 1,141 | | |
| Conservative | Mick Wenban | 1,112 | | |
| Conservative | Anthony Pritchard | 1,045 | | |
| Labour | Sarah Shepherd | 660 | | |
| Labour | Jean Christie | 658 | | |
| Labour | Mary Pratley | 613 | | |
| UKIP | David Beattie | 242 | | |
| Turnout | | 5,471 | 42 | +5 |
| Conservative hold | | Swing | | |
| Conservative hold | | Swing | | |
| Conservative hold | | Swing | | |
