= Fiona Mactaggart =

British politician (born 1953)

The Right Honourable Fiona Mactaggart
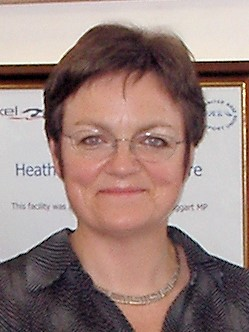
- Mactaggart in 2005

Parliamentary Under-Secretary of State for Criminal Justice, Race and Victims
- In office 13 June 2003 – 5 May 2006
- Prime Minister: Tony Blair
- Preceded by: Hilary Benn
- Succeeded by: Gerry Sutcliffe

Member of Parliament for Slough
- In office 1 May 1997 – 3 May 2017
- Preceded by: John Arthur Watts
- Succeeded by: Tan Dhesi

Personal details
- Born: Fiona Margaret Mactaggart; 12 September 1953 (age 72) London, England
- Party: Labour
- Relations: Sir Ian Mactaggart Bt; Sir Herbert Williams
- Education: Cheltenham Ladies' College; King's College London; University College London; Goldsmiths University of London
- Profession: Teaching
- Website: www.fionamactaggart.org.uk

Fiona Margaret Mactaggart (born 12 September 1953) is a British politician and former primary school teacher who has been chair of the Fawcett Society since 2018. A member of the Labour Party, she was Member of Parliament (MP) for Slough from 1997 to 2017.

== Early life and career ==
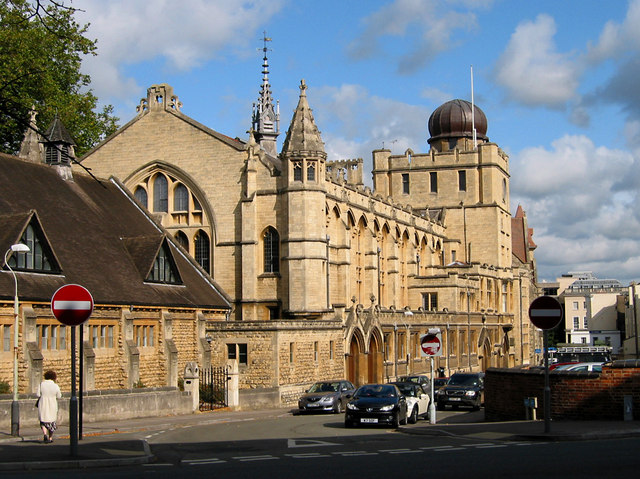
Cheltenham Ladies' College

Fiona Margaret Mactaggart was born at The London Clinic on 12 September 1953. She was educated at the independent Cheltenham Ladies' College. She read for a BA in English at King's College London, an MA at the Institute of Education and a PGCE at Goldsmiths, University of London. While at university, she was an outspoken member of the Young Students and Socialists Society and sought to live down her school days at Cheltenham Ladies' College.

Mactaggart was vice-president and National Secretary of the National Union of Students from 1978 to 1981. She was Press and Public Relations Officer for the National Council for Voluntary Organisations (NCVO) for six months before being General Secretary of the Joint Council for the Welfare of Immigrants from 1982 to 1987. She was a primary school teacher in Peckham from 1987 to 1992, noting "I have a voice that children can hear at the other end of the playground".

She was elected to Wandsworth Council in 1986 to represent the Shaftesbury ward and was Leader of the Labour Group from 1988 to 1990, when she lost her seat. From 1992 to 1997, she was a lecturer in Primary Education at the Institute of Education and Chair of Liberty, the civil liberties rights pressure group. While a primary school teacher, she decided to become an MP, as being able to change the world "thirty kids at a time" seemed too slow for her. She is a feminist.

== Parliamentary career ==
Mactaggart was elected as Labour MP for Slough in 1997. She was selected to stand for election for Labour through an all-women shortlist. From May 2003, until she asked to leave her post in the 5 May 2006 Cabinet reshuffle, she served at the Home Office as Parliamentary Under-Secretary of State for Criminal Justice, Race and Victims.

In 2004, Mactaggart attracted criticism for a reluctance to condemn violent protests by Sikhs which led to the cancellation of the play Behzti at the Birmingham Repertory Theatre. Around a thousand protesters stormed the production, set in a temple, at the opening of the curtain. Speaking on BBC Radio 4, Mactaggart said: "I think that when people are moved by theatre to protest, in a way that's a sign of the free speech which is so much part of the British tradition. I think that it's a great thing that people care enough about a performance to protest". Mactaggart also suggested the play and its author would benefit from the violent protests, adding that the controversy was "a sign of a lively flourishing cultural life".

In November 2008, Mactaggart attracted criticism for using unreliable statistics during a parliamentary debate on prostitution. Mactaggart was asked how those criminalised by a new law were supposed to know if a prostitute had been trafficked or not. She replied "I think they can guess... something like 80% of women in prostitution are controlled by their drug dealer, their pimp, or their trafficker." When questioned on her claim she stated that it "came from an official Government publication into prostitution and the sex trade". However, a BBC magazine article states that "it is impossible to find that number in any research done on this subject." The Home Office have also stated that they "do not endorse or use the figure that 80 per cent of prostitutes are controlled by others". The controversy continued in January 2009 when Mactaggart told the House of Commons that she regarded all women prostitutes as the victims of trafficking, because their route into the sector "almost always involves coercion, enforced addiction to drugs and violence from their pimps or traffickers." Again this claim is not supported by any known research.

She tabled a private member's bill in 2010 calling for businesses to report on modern slavery in their supply chains.

In May 2011, Mactaggart was criticised by the Association of Political Thought for calling some of the views of London School of Economics professor of political and gender theory Anne Phillips "frankly nauseating" because of her supposed support for prostitution. This assessment was based on the existence of a question on an LSE reading list about the ethical differences between legal waged labour and prostitution. Mactaggart had previously caused controversy with her hard-line approach to the issue of prostitution by comparing men who use prostitutes to abusers of children, stating "I don't think most men who use prostitutes think of themselves as child abusers, but they are".

In October 2013, Mactaggart was one of only six Labour MPs – the others being Diane Abbott, Jeremy Corbyn, Kelvin Hopkins, John McDonnell and Dennis Skinner – to oppose Theresa May's Immigration Act 2014. Four years later, the bill resulted in the Windrush scandal.

In February 2014 Mactaggart asked the Secretary of State for Work and Pensions, Iain Duncan Smith, if he would "make it his policy not to offer job subsidies for employing teenagers as auxiliary workers in adult entertainment establishments". Her question related to employers in the adult entertainment industry being offered over £2,000 incentive from the Department for Work and Pensions for every unemployed young person (aged 18–24) that they hired. Esther McVey, the Minister of State for Employment, stated that "The Welfare Reform Act 2012 ensured that vacancies which involve performing sexual activities were banned from being advertised on Government websites and a distinction was made in law to differentiate between performers and ancillary workers."

Later in 2014 Mactaggart was appointed to the Intelligence and Security Committee. She abstained in the September 2014 vote on whether or not to enter the war against ISIL.

In March 2015, she was appointed to the Privy Council of the United Kingdom and therefore granted the title The Right Honourable.

Mactaggart stood down prior to the 2017 general election, citing how divisive politics had become. After standing down, she became chair of the Fawcett Society the following year.

== Personal life ==
In 2003, Mactaggart received cancer treatment.

Her father, the late Sir Ian Mactaggart, Bt, was a multimillionaire Glasgow property developer, Conservative candidate and Eurosceptic. Her mother's father, Sir Herbert Williams, Bt, was a Conservative Member of Parliament for 27 years. Her great-grandfather was Sir John Mactaggart, the first treasurer of the first branch of Keir Hardie's Labour Party. Her father left her a fifth of his £6.5m estate, and it is thought she was the second richest Labour MP. Critics often make an issue of Mactaggart's considerable wealth, with journalist Benedict Brogan describing her as "a Scottish laird who is as wealthy as she is humourless".

Mactaggart owns three homes, one in London, one on the Isle of Islay and a flat in Slough. She has multiple sclerosis and is an ovarian cancer survivor. Her sister stood as a Parliamentary candidate for the Liberal Democrats in Devizes in the 1992 General Election.

Mactaggart donated £300,000 to the Labour Party in 2023.

Parliament of the United Kingdom
Preceded by John Watts	Member of Parliament for Slough; 1997–2017	Succeeded by Tan Dhesi
