= Margate West =

Former electoral division of Kent, England

Coordinates: 51°23′N 1°21′E

St Mildred's Bay, Westgate-on-Sea is at the heart of the Division.

Margate West was an electoral division of Kent County Council covering Westgate-on-Sea, Westbrook and Garlinge. In the 2009 election, 3668 people voted out of an electorate of 11,817 and the Conservative Robert Burgess was returned. It was replaced by Margate electoral division for the 2017 Kent County Council election.

Up to 1973 the name applied to a ward of Margate Municipal District. When the Municipal District was included in the Thanet Borough in 1974, Margate West ward elected three councillors to the new Borough, but following the boundary changes of 1979 this was reduced to two.
