= John Watts (British politician) =

English politician (1947–2016)

Minister of State for Transport
- In office 20 July 1994 – 2 May 1997
- Prime Minister: John Major
- Preceded by: Roger Freeman
- Succeeded by: Gavin Strang

Member of Parliament for Slough
- In office 9 June 1983 – 8 April 1997
- Preceded by: Joan Lestor
- Succeeded by: Fiona Mactaggart

Personal details
- Born: John Arthur Watts; 19 April 1947
- Died: 16 September 2016 (aged 69)
- Party: Conservative

John Arthur Watts (19 April 1947 – 8 September 2016) was a Conservative Party Member of Parliament in the United Kingdom House of Commons between 1983 and 1997.

Watts was educated at Bishopshalt Grammar School, Hillingdon, and Gonville and Caius College, Cambridge, where he chaired the Cambridge University Conservative Association. Following graduation he became a chartered accountant. After boundary changes in 1983, Watts defeated Joan Lestor, the former Labour MP for Eton and Slough, to win the new constituency of Slough. Watts decided not to contest the Slough seat at the 1997 General Election due to unfavourable boundary changes, and contested Reading East where the sitting Conservative MP was retiring; however, he was defeated by the Labour candidate, Jane Griffiths.

Watts died in September 2016 at the age of 69.

Parliament of the United Kingdom
New constituency	Member of Parliament for Slough; 1983–1997	Succeeded by Fiona Mactaggart
