= 2003 Gravesham Borough Council election =

2003 UK local government election

← 1999	1 May 2003	2007 →

All 44 seats in the Gravesham Borough Council 23 seats needed for a majority
	First party	Second party
Party	Labour	Conservative
Last election	29 seats, 51.0%	15 seats, 42.3%
Seats won	23	21
Seat change	▼6	▲6
Popular vote	8,754	11,241
Percentage	43.0%	55.3%
Swing	▼8.0%	▲13.0%
- Map of the results of the 2003 Gravesham council election. Labour in red and Conservatives in blue.
Council control before election
Labour
Council control after election
Labour

The 2003 Gravesham Borough Council election took place on 1 May 2003 to elect members of Gravesham Borough Council in Kent, England. The whole council was up for election with boundary changes since the last election in 1999. The Labour Party stayed in overall control of the council.

== Election result ==
Overall turnout at the election was 31%.

Gravesham local election result 2003
Party	Seats	Gains	Losses	Net gain/loss	Seats %	Votes %	Votes	+/−
Labour	23			-6	52.3	43.0	8,754	
Conservative	21			+6	47.7	55.3	11,241	
Liberal Democrats	0			0	0	0.9	155	
Green	0			0	0	0.4	190	

== Ward results ==
Central (3)
Party	Candidate	Votes	%
Conservative	Caerys Ayling	862	
Conservative	Bronwen McGarrity	838	
Conservative	Anthony Pritchard	806	
Labour	Lana Aitchison	704	
Labour	Tarsem Mahil	663	
Labour	Wayne Bushbridge	640	
Turnout		4,513	37.3

Chalk
Party	Candidate	Votes	%
Conservative	Lynne Ennis-Goatham	427	66.0
Labour	Paul McNulty	220	34.0
Majority		207	32.0
Turnout		647	37.7

Coldharbour (2)
Party	Candidate	Votes	%
Labour	Valerie Ashenden	463	
Labour	Ernest Brook	442	
Conservative	Joan Beer	225	
Conservative	Marjorie Knight	216	
Turnout		1,346	22.3

Higham (2)
Party	Candidate	Votes	%
Conservative	Patricia Oakeshott	858	
Conservative	Colin Jupp	791	
Labour	Eileen Rice	275	
Labour	Douglas Christie	254	
Turnout		2,178	36.5

Istead Rise (2)
Party	Candidate	Votes	%
Conservative	Kenneth Jones	901	
Conservative	David Turner	882	
Labour	Richard Cook	192	
Labour	Derek Sales	175	
Turnout		2,150	39.1

Meopham North (2)
Party	Candidate	Votes	%
Conservative	Michael Snelling	892	
Conservative	Donald Menzies	887	
Labour	Eileen Abbott	243	
Labour	Pamela Sales	216	
Green	Richard Crawford	190	
Turnout		2,428	37.8

Meopham South & Vigo (2)
Party	Candidate	Votes	%
Conservative	Raymonde Collins	706	
Conservative	Patrick McSweeney	697	
Labour	Dorothy Riley	209	
Labour	Mary Williams	196	
Turnout		1,808	29.7

Northfleet North (3)
Party	Candidate	Votes	%
Labour	Raymond Parker	530	
Labour	Colin Meredith	527	
Labour	Richard Target	503	
Conservative	Constance Dyke	279	
Conservative	Robert Somerset	270	
Conservative	Paul Parrin	266	
Turnout		2,375	20.6

Northfleet South (3)
Party	Candidate	Votes	%
Labour	James Loughlin	735	
Labour	John Burden	726	
Labour	Narinder Thandi	713	
Conservative	Jeremy Black	392	
Conservative	Julia Burgoyne	360	
Conservative	Malcolm Burgoyne	342	
Turnout		3,268	25.8

Painters Ash (3)
Party	Candidate	Votes	%
Labour	Jean Christie	827	
Labour	Ronald Bowman	804	
Labour	Henry Smith	758	
Conservative	James Hall	639	
Conservative	Yvonne Stanford	630	
Conservative	Eileen Tuff	602	
Liberal Democrats	Ian Stevenson	155	
Liberal Democrats	Gillian McGill	152	
Liberal Democrats	Mervyn McGill	137	
Turnout		4,704	35.7

Pelham (3)
Party	Candidate	Votes	%
Labour	Makhan Singh	844	
Labour	Catherine Cribbon	826	
Labour	David Thomas	805	
Conservative	Clarice Masterson	562	
Conservative	Anne Barrow	512	
Conservative	John Subbings	506	
Turnout		4,055	32.6

Riverside (3)
Party	Candidate	Votes	%
Labour	Lee Croxton	684	
Labour	Richard Smith	675	
Labour	Lyn Milner	668	
Conservative	Christopher Barnes	304	
Conservative	Helen Skellorn	270	
Conservative	Clifford Hayes	265	
Turnout		2,866	24.8

Riverview (2)
Party	Candidate	Votes	%
Conservative	William Lambert	714	
Conservative	David Hurley	666	
Labour	Kenneth Green	466	
Labour	John Thompson	419	
Turnout		2,265	34.8

Shorne, Cobham & Luddesdown (2)
Party	Candidate	Votes	%
Conservative	Robin Theobald	1,039	
Conservative	Frank Marven	1,020	
Labour	Maureen Newell	218	
Labour	Rupinder Thandi	176	
Turnout		2,453	40.4

Singlewell (3)
Party	Candidate	Votes	%
Labour	Peter Rayner	615	
Labour	Margaret Mersh	595	
Labour	Andrea Webb	559	
Conservative	Margaret Lambert	495	
Conservative	Frederick Mapham	464	
Conservative	Cyril Wheeler	436	
Turnout		3,164	22.8

Westcourt (3)
Party	Candidate	Votes	%
Labour	Eileen Leadley	675	
Labour	Colin Caller	670	
Labour	Brian Newell	637	
Conservative	Robert Brereton	417	
Conservative	Juliet Baker	408	
Conservative	Graeme Biggs	395	
Turnout		3,202	25.1

Whitehill (2)
Party	Candidate	Votes	%
Conservative	George Lambton	651	
Conservative	Derek Robinson	641	
Labour	John Caller	495	
Labour	Stephen Webb	452	
Turnout		2,239	36.8

Woodlands (3)
Party	Candidate	Votes	%
Conservative	Ronald Stanford	878	
Conservative	William Dyke	874	
Conservative	Michael Wenban	867	
Labour	Carole Bowman	359	
Labour	Peter Leadley	353	
Labour	Surinder Singh	327	
Turnout		3,658	29.0
