= 1999 Gravesham Borough Council election =

1999 UK local government election

← 1995	6 May 1999	2003 →

All 44 seats in the Gravesham Borough Council 23 seats needed for a majority
- Turnout: 32.0%
	First party	Second party
Party	Labour	Conservative
Last election	34 seats, 61.6%	10 seats, 29.7%
Seats won	29	15
Seat change	▼5	▲5
Percentage	51.0%	42.3%
Swing	▼10.6%	▲12.7%
Council control before election
Labour
Council control after election
Labour

The 1999 Gravesham Borough Council election took place on 6 May 1999 to elect members of Gravesham Borough Council in Kent, England. The whole council was up for election and the Labour party stayed in overall control of the council.

== Election result ==
Gravesham local election result 1999
Party	Seats	Gains	Losses	Net gain/loss	Seats %	Votes %	Votes	+/−
Labour	29			-4	65.9	51.0		-10.6
Conservative	15			+5	34.1	42.3		+12.7
Independent	0			-1	0			
