= 2007 Gravesham Borough Council election =

2007 UK local government election

- 3 May 2007

All 44 seats in the Gravesham Borough Council 23 seats needed for a majority
	First party	Second party
Party	Conservative	Labour
Last election	21 seats, 55.3%	23 seats, 43.0%
Seats won	28	16
Seat change	▲7	▼7
Popular vote	13,786	8,918
Percentage	54.8%	35.5%
Swing	▼0.5%	▼7.5%
- Map of the results of the 2007 Gravesham council election. Labour in red and Conservatives in blue.
Council control before election
Labour
Council control after election
Conservative

The 2007 Gravesham Borough Council election took place on 3 May 2007 to elect members of Gravesham Borough Council in Kent, England. The whole council (all 44 seats) was up for election and the Conservative Party gained overall control of the council from the Labour Party.

== Background ==
Before the election Labour had run the council since 1995 and since the 2003 election had 23 seats, compared to 21 for the Conservatives. The Conservatives therefore needed to gain 2 seats to take control from Labour.

== Election result ==
The results saw the Conservatives gain control of the council from Labour, the first time the Conservatives had control of the council in 20 years. The Conservatives moved to 26 seats after winning 54% of the vote, while Labour dropped to 16 seats on a 40% vote share. Overall turnout at the election was 36.4%, up from 31% at the 2003 election.

The Conservative gains included taking all 3 seats in the wards of Painters Ash and Singlewell from Labour. The Conservatives also held the seats in Whitehill where the two sitting councillors, George Lambton and Derek Robinson, had stood as independents after being deselected by the Conservatives before the election. The leader of the Conservatives on the council, Michael Snelling, said "I am over the moon. I think we have exceeded our expectations.", while the Labour council leader, John Burden said he planned "to come back in four years' time".

The election in Meopham North was postponed after the death of one of the Conservative councillors Malcolm Burgoyne on 25 April. The delayed election in Meopham North was held on 21 June and saw the Conservatives hold both seats in the ward. The Conservative leader, Michael Snelling, was one of the two winners in Meopham North and as a result was able to then become the new leader of the council.

Gravesham local election result 2007
Party	Seats	Gains	Losses	Net gain/loss	Seats %	Votes %	Votes	+/−
Conservative	28	7	0	+7	61.9	54.8	13,786	-0.5
Labour	16	0	7	-7	38.1	35.5	8,918	-7.5
Liberal Democrats	0	0	0	0	0.0	5.8	1,459	+5.0
Green	0	0	0	0	0.0	2.0	491	+1.1
Independent	0	0	0	0	0.0	1.5	383	+1.5
Monster Raving Loony	0	0	0	0	0.0	0.5	114	+0.5

== Ward results ==
Central (3)
Party	Candidate	Votes	%	±%
Conservative	Greta Goatley	1,081		
Conservative	Bronwen McGarrity	1,041		
Conservative	Samir Jassal	998		
Labour	Lana Aitchison	727		
Labour	Mukhtar Goraya	667		
Labour	Maureen Newell	651		
Turnout		5,165	43	+6
Conservative hold		Swing		
Conservative hold		Swing		
Conservative hold		Swing		

Chalk
Party	Candidate	Votes	%	±%
Conservative	Leslie Hills	501	76.6	+10.6
Labour	Colin Pritchard	153	23.4	−10.6
Majority		348	53.2	+21.2
Turnout		654	38	+0
Conservative hold		Swing		

Coldharbour
Party	Candidate	Votes	%	±%
Labour	Susan Howes	564		
Labour	Rosemary Leadley	535		
Conservative	Murray Barrett	383		
Conservative	John Stubbings	364		
Turnout		1,846	31	+9
Labour hold		Swing		
Labour hold		Swing		

Higham (2)
Party	Candidate	Votes	%	±%
Conservative	Patricia Oakeshott	994		
Conservative	Bryan Sweetland	799		
Labour	Eileen Rice	251		
Green	Gwen Easdown	197		
Labour	Leslie Howes	190		
Turnout		2,431	41	+4
Conservative hold		Swing		
Conservative hold		Swing		

Istead Rise (2)
Party	Candidate	Votes	%	±%
Conservative	David Turner	1,023		
Conservative	Kenneth Jones	1,013		
Labour	Douglas Christie	185		
Labour	David Webber	170		
Turnout		2,391	44	+5
Conservative hold		Swing		
Conservative hold		Swing		

Meopham North (2)
Party	Candidate	Votes	%	±%
Conservative	Michael Snelling	681		
Conservative	Laura Hryniewicz	662		
Liberal Democrats	James Willis	200		
Liberal Democrats	Gillian McGill	178		
Green	Richard Crawford	104		
Labour	Mary Williams	59		
Labour	Pamela Sales	57		
Monster Raving Loony	Lord Toby Jug	31		
Turnout		1,972	29.0	
Conservative hold		Swing		
Conservative hold		Swing		

Note: The election in Meopham North was delayed to 21 June due to the death of a candidate.

Meopham South and Vigo (2)
Party	Candidate	Votes	%	±%
Conservative	Leslye Boycott	853		
Conservative	Ray Collins	767		
Labour	Mark Waterfield	209		
Green	Ann Wakeman	190		
Labour	Colin Meredith	162		
Monster Raving Loony	Lord Toby Jug	83		
Turnout		2,264	36	+6
Conservative hold		Swing		
Conservative hold		Swing		

Northfleet North (3)
Party	Candidate	Votes	%	±%
Labour	Ronald Bowman	886		
Labour	Tanmanjeet Dhesi	849		
Labour	Andrea Webb	841		
Conservative	Clarice Masterson	437		
Conservative	Eileen Tuff	431		
Conservative	Arthur Fitz-Simon	417		
Liberal Democrats	Bruce Parmenter	178		
Liberal Democrats	James Willis	178		
Liberal Democrats	Emily Slight	166		
Turnout		4,383	32	+11
Labour hold		Swing		
Labour hold		Swing		
Labour hold		Swing		

Northfleet South (3)
Party	Candidate	Votes	%	±%
Labour	James Loughlin	740		
Labour	John Burden	730		
Labour	Narinder Thandi	706		
Conservative	John Nichols	551		
Conservative	Julia Burgoyne	510		
Conservative	Anne Welldon	463		
Liberal Democrats	Gillian McGill	192		
Turnout		3,892	31	+5
Labour hold		Swing		
Labour hold		Swing		
Labour hold		Swing		

Painters Ash
Party	Candidate	Votes	%	±%
Conservative	Harold Craske	874		
Conservative	Adrian Warburton	812		
Conservative	Peter Barbuti	790		
Labour	John Thompson	779		
Labour	Dick Target	770		
Labour	Harry Smith	743		
Liberal Democrats	Amanda Crane	248		
Liberal Democrats	Ian Stevenson	220		
Liberal Democrats	Mervyn McGill	195		
Turnout		5,431	43	+7
Conservative gain from Labour		Swing		
Conservative gain from Labour		Swing		
Conservative gain from Labour		Swing		

Pelham (3)
Party	Candidate	Votes	%	±%
Labour	Makhan Singh	967		
Labour	Jane Cribbon	956		
Labour	Derek Sales	943		
Conservative	Christopher Barnes	759		
Conservative	Doreen Fairbrother	694		
Conservative	Laura Hryniewicz	658		
Liberal Democrats	Robert McGill	203		
Liberal Democrats	Jodi Parmenter	148		
Turnout		5,328	39	+6
Labour hold		Swing		
Labour hold		Swing		
Labour hold		Swing		

Riverside (3)
Party	Candidate	Votes	%	±%
Labour	Lyn Milner	753		
Labour	Richard Smith	752		
Labour	Lee Croxton	738		
Conservative	Juliet Baker	469		
Conservative	Heather Frost	450		
Conservative	Helen Skellorn	447		
Turnout		3,609	29	+4
Labour hold		Swing		
Labour hold		Swing		
Labour hold		Swing		

Riverview
Party	Candidate	Votes	%	±%
Conservative	William Lambert	777		
Conservative	David Hurley	726		
Labour	Kenneth Green	407		
Labour	Robin McLauchlan	378		
Turnout		2,288	36	+1
Conservative hold		Swing		
Conservative hold		Swing		

Shorne, Cobham & Luddesdown (2)
Party	Candidate	Votes	%	±%
Conservative	Alex Moore	1,295	43.8	
Conservative	Robin Theobald	1,255	42.4	
Labour	Rita Mitchell	205	6.9	
Labour	Dorothy Riley	203	6.9	
Turnout		2,958	48	+8
Conservative hold		Swing		
Conservative hold		Swing		

Singlewell (3)
Party	Candidate	Votes	%	±%
Conservative	Sara Langdale	786		
Conservative	John Cubitt	763		
Conservative	Conrad Broadley	750		
Labour	Peggy Mersh	633		
Labour	Hopeton Robinson	593		
Labour	Stephen Webb	569		
Liberal Democrats	Sheila Scott	201		
Turnout		4,295	32	+9
Conservative gain from Labour		Swing		
Conservative gain from Labour		Swing		
Conservative gain from Labour		Swing		

Westcourt (3)
Party	Candidate	Votes	%	±%
Labour	Colin Caller	662		
Labour	John Caller	636		
Conservative	Graeme Biggs	613		
Conservative	Thomas Ballard	612		
Labour	Brian Newell	602		
Conservative	Teresa Sweetland	585		
Turnout		3,710	29	+4
Labour hold		Swing		
Labour hold		Swing		
Conservative gain from Labour		Swing		

Whitehill (2)
Party	Candidate	Votes	%	±%
Conservative	Diane Marsh	675		
Conservative	Glen Handley	670		
Labour	Brian Francis	382		
Labour	Alfred Mersh	371		
Independent	Derek Robinson	164		
Independent	George Lambton	153		
Turnout		2,415	40	+3
Conservative hold		Swing		
Conservative hold		Swing		

Woodlands (3)
Party	Candidate	Votes	%	±%
Conservative	William Dyke	1,034		
Conservative	Mick Wenban	1,013		
Conservative	Anthony Pritchard	966		
Labour	Carole Bowman	356		
Labour	Andrew Delapena	329		
Labour	Peter Leadley	323		
Liberal Democrats	David Bigelow	237		
Independent	Ronald Stanford	219		
Turnout		4,477	37	+8
Conservative hold		Swing		
Conservative hold		Swing		
Conservative hold		Swing		
