= 2019 Gravesham Borough Council election =

2019 UK local government election

← 2015	2 May 2019	2023 →

All 44 seats to Gravesham Borough Council 23 seats needed for a majority
	First party	Second party	Third party
Party	Labour	Conservative	Independent
Last election	21 seats, 34.3%	23 seats, 42.2%	0 seats
Seats won	24	18	2
Seat change	▲3	▼5	▲2
Percentage	40%	41%	5%
- Map of the results of the 2019 Gravesham council election. Labour in red and Conservatives in blue.
Council control before election
Conservative
Council control after election
Labour

The 2019 Gravesham Borough Council election took place on 2 May 2019 to elect members of the Gravesham Borough Council in Kent, England. It was held on the same day as other local elections. The Labour Party gained control of the council from the Conservative Party. Cllr Gurdip Bungar was elected as Mayor of Gravesham for the year 2019-2020.

== Summary ==
Party	Candidates	Seats	Gains	Losses	Net gain/loss	Seats %	Votes %	Votes	+/−
Labour	37	24	3	0	▲3	54.5	40.3	20,540	–4.1
Conservative	44	18	0	5	▼5	40.9	41.1	20,957	–1.1
Independent	6	2	2	0	▲2	4.5	5.0	2,536	+4.7
UKIP	14	0	0	0	Steady	0.0	8.3	4,241	–0.7
Liberal Democrats	6	0	0	0	Steady	0.0	3.4	1,754	N/A
Green	4	0	0	0	Steady	0.0	1.9	972	–2.2

== Ward results ==
=== Central ===
Central (3)
Party	Candidate	Votes	%
Labour	Steve Thompson	858	45.1
Labour	Emma Louise Morley	852	44.8
Labour	Gurdip Bungar	846	44.5
Conservative	Samuel Edward Robson	650	34.2
Conservative	Bryan John Sweetland	635	33.4
Conservative	Yetunde Adeola	548	28.8
Green	Richard Paul Bayfield	385	20.2
UKIP	Linda Margaret Talbot	266	14.0
Turnout		1,902	
Labour gain from Conservative			
Labour hold			
Labour hold			

=== Chalk ===
Chalk
Party	Candidate	Votes	%
Conservative	Leslie Hills	414	76.7
Labour	Jean Ross Christie	126	23.3
Turnout		540	
Conservative hold			

=== Coldharbour ===
Coldharbour (2)
Party	Candidate	Votes	%
Labour	Shane Mochrie-Cox	515	56.5
Labour	Christina Marie Rolles	446	48.9
UKIP	Emmanuel Feyisetan	225	24.7
Conservative	Bronwen McGarrity	202	22.1
Conservative	Peter Martin Hicks	193	21.2
Turnout		912	
Labour hold			
Labour hold			

=== Higham ===
Higham (2)
Party	Candidate	Votes	%
Independent	Leslie Pearton	559	45.1
Independent	Harold Craske	430	34.7
Conservative	Helen Gabrielle Ashenden	406	32.8
Conservative	Samir Jassal	326	26.3
UKIP	Luke Knott	212	17.1
Labour	Alexander Edward Wallace	202	16.3
Turnout		1,239	
Independent hold			
Independent hold			

=== Istead Rise ===
Istead Rise (2)
Party	Candidate	Votes	%
Conservative	Dakota Geoffrey Ian Dibben	610	60.1
Conservative	Alan Michael Ridgers	567	55.9
UKIP	Daniel Ellis	264	26.0
Labour	Jenny Beardsall	183	18.0
Turnout		1,015	
Conservative hold			
Conservative hold			

=== Meopham North ===
Meopham North (2)
Party	Candidate	Votes	%
Conservative	Gary John Harding	638	55.0
Conservative	Frank Wardle	602	51.9
Liberal Democrats	Sarah Gillian Death	393	33.9
Liberal Democrats	John Richard Death	388	33.4
Labour	Douglas Christie	173	14.9
Labour	Mary Linda Williams	135	11.6
Turnout		1,161	
Conservative hold			
Conservative hold			

=== Meopham South and Vigo ===
Meopham South and Vigo (2)
Party	Candidate	Votes	%
Conservative	Margaret Denise Tiran	469	25.9
Conservative	Mohammad Ejaz Aslam	376	20.8
Liberal Democrats	Adrian Banks	277	15.3
Liberal Democrats	Alec Coutroubis	209	11.5
UKIP	Alan Nightingale	202	11.1
Green	Ruiha Gayle Smalley	124	6.8
Labour	Mary Rose Pratley	79	4.4
Labour	Kevin Divall	76	4.2
Turnout		1,812	
Conservative hold			
Conservative hold			

=== Northfleet North ===
Northfleet North (3)
Party	Candidate	Votes	%
Labour	Peter Scollard	778	56.1
Labour	Lauren Sullivan	767	55.3
Labour	Gurbax Singh	758	54.6
UKIP	Mike Dixon	310	22.3
Conservative	Brenda Harding	308	22.2
Conservative	Hayley Jane Hatch	292	21.0
Conservative	Teresa Sweetland	258	18.6
Turnout		1,388	
Labour hold			
Labour hold			
Labour hold			

=== Northfleet South ===
Northfleet South (3)
Party	Candidate	Votes	%
Labour	John Burden	791	51.3
Labour	Narinder-Jit Thandi	754	48.9
Labour	Elizabeth Anne Mulheran	749	48.6
UKIP	Richard Anthony Hill	385	25.0
Conservative	Brenda Beetham	376	24.4
Conservative	Lauren Ashleigh Yates	352	22.8
Conservative	Heather Shakespeare Frost	350	22.7
Turnout		1,542	
Labour hold			
Labour hold			
Labour hold			

=== Painters Ash ===
Painters Ash (3)
Party	Candidate	Votes	%
Conservative	Emma Jayne Elliott	648	43.4
Conservative	Conrad Broadley	639	42.8
Labour	Nirmal Singh Khabra	578	38.7
Labour	Rob Halpin	545	36.5
Labour	Lindsay Susan Gordon	520	34.8
Conservative	Munhib Anis Syed	480	32.1
UKIP	William Fox	372	24.9
Turnout		1,494	
Conservative hold			
Conservative hold			
Labour hold			

=== Pelham ===
Pelham (3)
Party	Candidate	Votes	%
Labour	Brian Sangha	1,076	64.8
Labour	Baljit Singh Hayre	1,062	63.9
Labour	Jenny Wallace	1,039	62.6
Conservative	Stephen King	476	28.7
Conservative	Mary Helen Ridgers	458	27.6
Conservative	Eileen Tuff	445	26.8
Turnout		1,661	
Labour hold			
Labour hold			
Labour hold			

=== Riverside ===
Riverside (3)
Party	Candidate	Votes	%
Labour	Lyn Milner	815	51.5
Labour	Lee Croxton	792	50.0
Labour	Lenny Rolles	674	42.6
Independent	Thomas O'Keeffe	401	25.3
Conservative	Ian Geoffrey Dibben	304	19.2
Conservative	Dalwara Singh Dhell	286	18.1
UKIP	Robert John Toulson	275	17.4
Green	Marna Eilish Gilligan	256	16.2
Conservative	Sumayyah Saeed Uddin Khan	212	13.4
Turnout		1,583	
Labour hold			
Labour hold			
Labour hold			

=== Riverview ===
Riverview (2)
Party	Candidate	Votes	%
Conservative	Aaron Stephen Elliott	640	50.4
Conservative	Derek Ashenden	583	45.9
UKIP	Tina Brooker	454	35.8
Labour	Paul Michael Anthony Pretty	248	19.5
Green	Martin James Wilson	207	16.3
Turnout		1,269	
Conservative hold			
Conservative hold			

=== Shorne, Cobham & Luddesdown ===
Shorne, Cobham & Luddesdown (2)
Party	Candidate	Votes	%
Conservative	Bob Lane	976	69.7
Conservative	Tony Rice	806	57.6
Independent	Robin Neville Theobald	488	34.9
Labour	Caroline Ruth Shelton	190	13.6
Turnout		1,400	
Conservative hold			
Conservative hold			

=== Singlewell ===
Singlewell (3)
Party	Candidate	Votes	%
Conservative	Diane Marsh	561	39.7
Labour	Sarah Rosemary Gow	551	39.0
Labour	Brian Francis	543	38.5
Conservative	Jacob Daniel Nicholas Hatch	542	38.4
Labour	Peter John Rayner	528	37.4
Conservative	Harry Francis Shovelar	511	36.2
UKIP	Daniel Robert John Brooker	357	25.3
Turnout		1,412	
Conservative hold			
Labour hold			
Labour hold			

=== Westcourt ===
Westcourt (3)
Party	Candidate	Votes	%
Labour	Colin Caller	490	42.0
Labour	John Caller	462	39.6
Labour	Ruth Martin	437	37.4
Conservative	Richard James Clark	381	32.6
Conservative	Linda Manchester	378	32.4
Conservative	Tunde Afolabi-Brown	320	27.4
UKIP	Connor Ward	299	25.6
Independent	Ife Olu	137	11.7
Turnout		1,167	
Labour hold			
Labour hold			
Labour hold			

=== Whitehill ===
Whitehill (2)
Party	Candidate	Votes	%
Conservative	Les Hoskins	455	43.0
Labour	Tony Rana	437	41.3
Conservative	Kiran Jassal	402	38.0
UKIP	Brian Lacey	280	26.5
Turnout		1,057	
Conservative hold			
Labour gain from Conservative			

=== Woodlands ===
Woodlands (3)
Party	Candidate	Votes	%
Conservative	Jordan Michael David Meade	645	40.9
Conservative	Anthony Roy Pritchard	627	39.8
Conservative	Gurjit Kaur Bains	610	38.7
Independent	Mick Wenban	521	33.1
Labour	Gurvinder Singh Saluja	465	29.5
UKIP	David Beattie	340	21.6
Liberal Democrats	Sharan Virk	265	16.8
Liberal Democrats	Ukonu Elisha Obasi	222	14.1
Turnout		1,576	
Conservative hold			
Conservative hold			
Conservative hold			

== Changes 2019–2023 ==
Westcourt by-election, 17 October 2019
Party	Candidate	Votes	%	±%
Conservative	Helen Gabrielle Ashenden	492	50	
Labour	Lindsay Susan Gordon	314	32	
UKIP	Linda Margaret Talbot	116	12	
Green	Marna Eilish Gilligan	60	6	
Turnout				
Conservative gain from Labour				

The Westcourt by-election in October 2019 was triggered by the death of Labour councillor Ruth Martin.

Westcourt by-election, 6 May 2021
Party	Candidate	Votes	%	±%
Conservative	Samir Jassal	577	49	
Labour	Karina Mary O'Malley	534	46	
Liberal Democrats	Ukonu Elisha Obasi	56	5	
Turnout				
Conservative gain from Labour				

The Westcourt by-election in May 2021 had been triggered by the death of Labour councillor Colin Caller. He had died in February 2020 but no by-election could be held earlier due to the COVID-19 pandemic. Following this by-election Labour had 22 of the council's 44 seats, putting it under no overall control.

In February 2023, independent councillor Leslie Pearton joined the Conservatives.
