= 2015 Gravesham Borough Council election =

2015 UK local government election

← 2011	7 May 2015	2019 →

All 44 seats in the Gravesham Borough Council 23 seats needed for a majority
	First party	Second party
Party	Conservative	Labour
Last election	19 seats, 50.4%	25 seats, 45.1%
Seats won	23	21
Seat change	▲4	▼4
Popular vote	20,763	16,901
Percentage	42.2%	34.3%
Swing	▼8.2%	▼10.8%
- Map of the results of the 2015 Gravesham council election. Labour in red and Conservatives in blue.
Council control before election
Labour
Council control after election
Conservative

The 2015 Gravesham Borough Council election took place on 7 May 2015 to elect members of the Gravesham Borough Council in England. It was held on the same day as other local elections. The Conservative Party gained control of the council from the Labour Party.

== Ward results ==
=== Central ===
Central (3)
Party	Candidate	Votes	%
Conservative	Greta Goatley	1,454	
Labour	Gurdip Bungar	1,361	
Labour	Steve Thompson	1,340	
Conservative	Jay Turner	1,295	
Conservative	Gurdev Singh Talwar	1,252	
Labour	Aman Sandhu	1,222	
UKIP	Joshua Hughes	718	
Turnout		3,458	71%
Conservative hold			
Labour hold			
Labour hold			

=== Chalk ===
Chalk
Party	Candidate	Votes	%
Conservative	Leslie Hills	744	56.0%
UKIP	Mike Dixon	302	22.7%
Labour	Alexander Wallace	283	21.3%
Majority		442	33.3%
Turnout		1,329	76%
Conservative hold			

=== Coldharbour ===
Coldharbour (2)
Party	Candidate	Votes	%
Labour	Sue Howes	888	
Conservative	Bronwen McGarrity	785	
UKIP	Emmanuel Feyisetan	749	
Labour	Shane Mochrie-Cox	737	
Turnout		3,159	61%
Labour hold			
Conservative gain from Labour			

=== Higham ===
Higham (2)
Party	Candidate	Votes	%
Conservative	Leslie Pearton	1,510	
Conservative	Harold Craske	1,419	
Labour	Jean Christie	619	
Labour	Anne Gill	594	
Turnout		2,387	75%
Conservative hold			
Conservative hold			

=== Istead Rise ===
Istead Rise (2)
Party	Candidate	Votes	%
Conservative	John Knight	1,205	
Conservative	David Turner	1,141	
UKIP	Ryan Waters	580	
Labour	Jenny Beardsall	382	
Labour	Derek Sales	243	
Turnout		2,631	50%
Conservative hold			
Conservative hold			

=== Meopham North ===
Meopham North (2)
Party	Candidate	Votes	%
Conservative	Julia Burgoyne	1,594	
Conservative	John Cubitt	1,336	
UKIP	Sean Marriott	611	
Labour	Douglas Christie	576	
Labour	Pam Sales	371	
Turnout		2,799	78%
Conservative hold			
Conservative hold			

=== Meopham South and Vigo ===
Meopham South and Vigo (2)
Party	Candidate	Votes	%
Conservative	Lesley Boycott	1,400	
Conservative	Derek Shelbrooke	1,307	
UKIP	Alan Nightingale	657	
Labour	Kevin Divall	405	
Labour	Mary Williams	250	
Turnout		2,579	73%
Conservative hold			
Conservative hold			

=== Northfleet North ===
Northfleet North (3)
Party	Candidate	Votes	%
Labour	Peter Rayner	1,442	
Labour	Lauren Sullivan	1,390	
Labour	Peter Scollard	1,389	
Conservative	Conrad Broadley	1,031	
UKIP	Andy Desmond	981	
Green	Jessica Arveschoug	384	
Green	William Arveschoug	333	
Turnout		3,133	60%
Labour hold			
Labour hold			
Labour hold			

=== Northfleet South ===
Northfleet South (3)
Party	Candidate	Votes	%
Labour	John Burden	1,787	
Labour	John Loughlin	1,773	
Labour	Narinder-Jit Thandi	1,694	
Green	Erin Johnson	1,048	
Green	Ian Jones	905	
Turnout		3,436	63%
Labour hold			
Labour hold			
Labour hold			

=== Painters Ash ===
Painters Ash (3)
Party	Candidate	Votes	%
Conservative	Alan Ridgers	1,539	
Conservative	Sandra Garside	1,450	
Labour	Les Howes	1,254	
Labour	Sohan Singh Bhatti	1,231	
Labour	Jenny Wallace	1,074	
Green	Oliver Heyen	567	
Turnout		3168	70%
Conservative gain from Labour			
Conservative gain from Labour			
Labour hold			

=== Pelham ===
Pelham (3)
Party	Candidate	Votes	%
Labour	Catherine Cribbon	1,792	
Labour	Brian Sangha	1,708	
Labour	Makhan Singh	1,625	
Conservative	Jeremy Salisbury-Jones	1,246	
Conservative	Harbinder Singh Dhinsa	1,131	
Conservative	Sarbjit Kaur Sulh	1,038	
Green	Ruiha Smalley	525	
Turnout		3,537	66%
Labour hold			
Labour hold			
Labour hold			

=== Riverside ===
Riverside (3)
Party	Candidate	Votes	%
Labour	Lyn Milner	1,895	
Labour	Lee Croxton	1,782	
Labour	Lenny Rolles	1,584	
Conservative	Thomas O'Keeffe	1,304	
Turnout		3,334	60%
Labour hold			
Labour hold			
Labour hold			

=== Riverview ===
Riverview (2)
Party	Candidate	Votes	%
Conservative	William Lambert	1,165	
Conservative	David Hurley	921	
UKIP	John Roots	648	
Labour	Rachel Wilcocks	515	
Labour	Phil Scrivener	441	
Independent	Martin Wilson	322	
Green	Den Nichols	157	
Turnout		2,505	73%
Conservative hold			
Conservative hold			

=== Shorne, Cobham & Luddesdown ===
Shorne, Cobham & Luddesdown (2)
Party	Candidate	Votes	%
Conservative	Robin Theobald	1,699	
Conservative	Samir Jassal	1,329	
UKIP	Andrew Turner	707	
Labour	Ernie Brook	454	
Labour	Mary Pratley	425	
Turnout		2,647	80%
Conservative hold			
Conservative hold			

=== Singlewell ===
Singlewell (3)
Party	Candidate	Votes	%
Labour	Brian Francis	1,313	
Conservative	Jordan Meade	1,265	
Labour	Rob Halpin	1,128	
Labour	Jean Averibou	1,109	
UKIP	Tina Brooker	1,106	
Conservative	Yetunde Adeola	1,021	
UKIP	David Johnson	990	
Conservative	Omotoyosi Oladeinde	892	
Turnout		3,391	61%
Labour hold			
Conservative gain from Labour			
Labour hold			

=== Westcourt ===
Westcourt (3)
Party	Candidate	Votes	%
Labour	Valerie Ashenden	unopposed	
Labour	Colin Caller	unopposed	
Labour	John Caller	unopposed	
Turnout		5,195	39%
Labour hold			
Labour hold			
Labour hold			

=== Whitehill ===
Whitehill (2)
Party	Candidate	Votes	%
Conservative	Karen Hurdle	900	
Conservative	Gurjit Kaur Bains	810	
Labour	Natalie Allen	753	
UKIP	John Suan	593	
Labour	Veena Taak	571	
Turnout		2,245	69%
Conservative hold			
Conservative hold			

=== Woodlands ===
Woodlands (3)
Party	Candidate	Votes	%
Conservative	Sara Langdale	1,922	
Conservative	Mick Wenban	1,695	
Conservative	Anthony Pritchard	1,596	
Labour	Shaminder Singh Bedi	1,182	
Labour	Andrea Webb	996	
Labour	Keith Wyncoll	981	
UKIP	David Beattie	893	
Turnout		5,471	42%
Conservative hold			
Conservative hold			
Conservative hold			
