= Anna Span =

English film director (born 1971/1972)

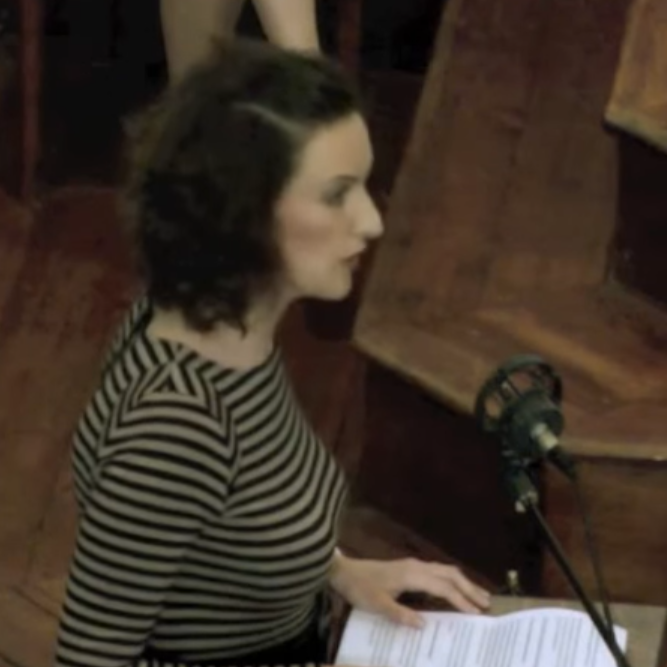
- Anna Span at a Cambridge Union debate in 2011
- Born: 1971 or 1972 (age 54–55); Greenwich, London, England, United Kingdom
- Education: Central Saint Martins College of Art and Design; Birkbeck College (MA); University of Sussex (PhD)
- Occupations: Director; producer
- Years active: 1999–2011

Anna Arrowsmith (born 1971 or 1972), who works under the pseudonym Anna Span, is a former English pornographic film director and producer. She makes frequent public appearances, speaking on sex, pornography and feminism.

== Early life and education ==
She was born and raised in Kent, England, United Kingdom, the daughter of finance director Clive Thompson. She is a graduate of film from the Central Saint Martins College of Art and Design. Her films are female-friendly based on her ideas first outlined in her 1997 dissertation 'Towards a New Pornography'. She later graduated with an MA in Philosophy from Birkbeck College, University of London, and studied for a PhD in Gender Studies at the University of Sussex, titled 'Rethinking Misogyny: How Men Experience Women to have Power in Dating Relationships'.

== Career ==
She had her first film aired in 1999 on UK porn channel Television X and has made over 250 scenes to date.

Her films focus on women enjoying sex with women or men, sometimes both. Other themes include sex toys, everyday objects (such as a chocolate bar or orange) being used as sex toys, threesomes, group sex, and gang bangs. Role playing and fantasy are also common. Sometimes a character from one of her films appears in another. There is a big emphasis on reality both in script and actor performances. In her films she includes a much higher than average percentage of shots which look at the men, which she has termed 'female point of view' shots.

Arrowsmith was the 2007/8 and 2008/9 Best Director at the UK Adult Film & TV Awards, where she also won four other awards for her DVD "Hug a Hoodie". She wanted to present a sympathetic image of the Young offender. British Conservative Party Leader David Cameron had taken a tough line on youth offenders but in July 2006 gave a sympathetic speech that was dubbed by the News of the World as 'Hug a Hoodie'. The phrase came into popular use in the UK despite Cameron insisting that he did not use it. She won Best British Film Brand at The UK's trade awards – the ETO Awards in 2008. In 2007 she won 'Indie Porn Pioneer', 2010 she won an award for Best Politician (somewhat prematurely) at the Erotic Awards and in 2011, and then the 'Best Bi Movie' at The International Emma Feminist Porn Awards, in Toronto. Her film Be My Toy Boy was nominated for best Film at the 2009 ETO Awards. She won the Palm Phwoar, Services to the Industry award in 2013.

After a shorter documentary aired on Channel 4 earlier in her career, in September 2007, she was the focus of a TV documentary entitled Sex Films For Girls, made by Five, which captured her views on pornography and her film approach and featured on-set filming during the making of a film. Her father also appeared in the documentary, expressing a negative view of pornography but a very supportive view of his daughter.

She is bisexual and has said, 'I'm bi and looking at two women together turns me on.'

She has given talks about pornography and feminism in various countries, for example at universities or film festivals and has debated on pornography with Germaine Greer and Gail Dines. In 2011, Span was invited alongside Jessi Fischer and Johnny Anglais to debate against Gail Dines, Richard Woolfson and Shelley Lubben at the University of Cambridge. The proposition that she argued was that 'This house believes that pornography does a good public service.' Span won the proposition with 231 in favour to 187 against with 197 abstentions. Dines said her opponents won because the chamber consisted mostly of '18-22-year-old males who were using pornography on a regular basis.'

She has had one manual and two academic works published: Erotic Home Video (now known as Shoot Your Own Adult Home Movies) in 2003; My Pornographic Development, A chapter on my aesthetic philosophy, published in the book Pornographic Art & The Aesthetics of Pornography available through Palgrave Macmillan in 2013 and her PhD Thesis rewritten as a book, Rethinking Misogyny: Men's Perceptions of Female Power in Dating Relationships in 2015, available through Routledge. She has been a peer reviewer for the academic journals Gender Studies, Men and Masculinities and Porn Studies.

Anna ran a campaign website called WeConsent.org on behalf of the people who work in the various sex industries against the various moral panics aimed at them and their industries. She has been a regular columnist of the Daily Sport newspaper, The Guardian newspaper, and the British women's sex magazine Scarlet. She has been an active member of Feminists Against Censorship since the late 1990s. Anna has also appeared on various TV programmes and press such as Newsnight, The Today Programme, PM, and Woman's Hour, defending the porn industry. Anna was Chair of the Adult Industry Trade Association from 2008-2010.

=== 2010 United Kingdom general election ===
Arrowsmith was the Liberal Democrat candidate for Gravesham in Kent for the 2010 United Kingdom general election. Conservative Adam Holloway held on to the seat by a considerable margin; Arrowsmith increased the Liberal Democrat vote share by nearly one third compared to the previous Lib Dem election results and by more than the regional average, but remained in third place behind Labour.

She explained her reasons for moving into politics in The Observer, which included: women's right to sexual expression and consumption, freedom of speech, and helping young people. Then Liberal Democrat party leader Nick Clegg said, "It's not exactly my cup of tea what she's been doing before she has put herself forward in parliament but I also think it's really important that people like her who really care a lot about her local area are encouraged to come into politics. You can't accuse her of being a cardboard cut-out Westminster politician."

== Personal life ==
Span lives in the US state of California as of 2018.

== Recognition ==
She was recognised as one of the BBC's 100 women of 2013.

== See also ==
- Sex-positive feminism
- Sex-positive movement
