= Jacques Arnold =

British politician (born 1947)

Jacques Arnold DL (born 27 August 1947) is a Conservative Party politician in the United Kingdom. He was the member of parliament (MP) for Gravesham in Kent from 1987, when he succeeded Tim Brinton, until he lost his seat in the landslide 1997 election. He is now a consultant and lecturer on Latin American Affairs as well as the author of a two-book series on political and genealogical subjects. He was appointed a Deputy Lieutenant of Kent in January 2013.

Unlike many of his fellow former Tory MPs, he refought the seat at the 2001 election – only to come second place to Labour's Chris Pond. The Tories regained the seat in 2005 with Adam Holloway becoming the MP, the first time since the 1951 general election that the seat had not been held by the party that won the general election.

== Biography ==
Jacques Arnold was educated at schools in Brazil, before returning to England in 1968, to attend the London School of Economics (LSE), where he attained a BSc (Hons.) in Economics. During that period he was Chairman of LSE Conservatives, the student society of the Tories at the London School of Economics.

== Career ==
Jacques Arnold started his career at Hill Samuel & Co., merchant bankers, in the City of London.

Between 1976 and 1978 he lived in São Paulo, where he established the Representative Office of Midland Bank Limited, serving as their Deputy Representative.

Returning to Britain, he was Regional Director of Thomas Cook Bankers from 1978 to 1983, with responsibilities for Latin America, Iberia and Africa, setting up new operations in São Paulo, Buenos Aires, Mexico City and Caracas, and running large established businesses in Spain, Portugal, South Africa, Nigeria and Libya. He was then successively Assistant Trade Finance Director of Midland Bank, and a Director of American Express Europe Ltd.

During that period he won the Oundle division of Northamptonshire County Council, and served as County Councillor from 1981 to 1985. He was Conservative Parliamentary Candidate for Coventry South East in 1983. In 1982 he succeeded Christopher Horne as Chairman of Hyde Park Tories, the Conservative team at Speakers' Corner.

He was a Parliamentary Private Secretary to David Maclean, Minister of State for the Environment, and then at the Home Office, from 1992 to 1995. He was a Member of the Education and Treasury Select Committees. He was Chairman of the Conservative backbench committee on Constitutional Affairs, and Secretary of the Conservative backbench committee on Foreign & Commonwealth Affairs. He was a member of the executive committee of the British Group, Inter-Parliamentary Union.

He also became chairman of both the Brazilian and Portuguese Parliamentary Groups, and Secretary of the British Latin American Parliamentary Group. He was an official parliamentary observer at the 1988 Chilean plebiscite, and also for the first elections in both Angola and Mozambique. He addressed a committee of the Brazilian Congress in Brasília during the constitutional crisis of 1992. He was a member of the Argentine British Conference, which brought the countries back together after the Falklands War.

Since leaving the House of Commons he has been Adviser to a number of major companies with interests in Latin America, notably BAE Systems, and FIRST Magazine. He also lectures on Latin America. He was Chairman of the Tonbridge & Malling Conservative Association, 2012–16. He is the author of two series of books: "A History of Britain’s Parliamentary Constituencies", and "The Royal Houses of Europe" a genealogical work.

== Personal life ==
Jacques Arnold is married to Patricia, and they have a son and two daughters. He is a Grand Official of the Brazilian National Order of the Southern Cross and a Deputy Lieutenant of Kent.

Parliament of the United Kingdom
Preceded by Timothy Brinton	Member of Parliament for Gravesham; 1987–1997	Succeeded by Chris Pond
