= 2023 Gravesham Borough Council election =

2023 English local government election

- 4 May 2023

All 39 seats to Gravesham Borough Council 20 seats needed for a majority
	First party	Second party	Third party
Leader	John Burden	Jordan Meade
Party	Labour	Conservative	Independent
Leader's seat	Rosherville	Higham & Shorne
Last election	24 seats, 40.3%	18 seats, 41.1%	2 seats, 5.0%
Seats before	22	21	1
Seats after	22	17	0
Seat change	▼2	▼1	▼2
Percentage	47%	48%	0%
Swing	▲7%	▲7%	▼5%
- Winner of each seat at the 2023 Gravesham Borough Council election.
Leader before election
John Burden
Labour
No overall control
Leader after election
John Burden
Labour

The 2023 Gravesham Borough Council election took place on 4 May 2023 to elect members of Gravesham Borough Council in Kent, England. This was on the same day as other local elections in England. New ward boundaries came into force for this election, reducing the number of councillors from 44 to 39. Cllr Gurdip Bungar was elected as Mayor of Gravesham for the year 2023-2024.

== Summary ==
Prior to the election the council was under no overall control, with Labour holding exactly half the seats. The election saw Labour regain an outright majority, taking 22 of the 39 seats.

=== Election result ===
2023 Gravesham Borough Council election
Party	Candidates	Seats	Gains	Losses	Net gain/loss	Seats %	Votes %	Votes	+/−
Labour	37	22	N/A	N/A	▼2	56.4	45.8	22,362	+5.5
Conservative	37	17	N/A	N/A	▼1	43.6	48.6	23,760	+7.5
Liberal Democrats	6	0	N/A	N/A	Steady	0.0	2.9	1,395	–0.5
Green	5	0	N/A	N/A	Steady	0.0	2.1	1,011	+0.2
Reform	3	0	N/A	N/A	Steady	0.0	0.7	320	N/A
Independent	0	0	N/A	N/A	▼2	0.0	N/A (Note: Did not stand candidates.)	N/A	–5.0

== Ward results ==
The Statement of Persons Nominated, which details the candidates standing in each ward, was released by Gravesham Borough Council following the close of nominations on 5 April 2023. The results for each ward were as follows:

=== Chalk ===
Chalk
Party	Candidate	Votes	%	±%
Conservative	Leslie Hills*	495	70.6	−6.1
Labour	Daniel Baber	206	29.4	+6.7
Majority		289	41.2	
Turnout		701	33.10	
Conservative win (new seat)				

=== Coldharbour and Perry Street ===
Coldharbour & Perry Street (3 seats)
Party	Candidate	Votes	%	±%
Labour	Shane Mochrie-Cox*	972	62.4	+5.9
Labour	Christina Rolles*	957	61.4	+12.5
Labour	Narinder-Jit Thandi*	953	61.2	
Conservative	Jeremy Black	485	31.1	
Conservative	Brenda Harding	481	30.9	
Conservative	George White	451	28.9	
Majority				
Turnout		1,558	24.21	
Labour win (new seat)				
Labour win (new seat)				
Labour win (new seat)				

=== Denton ===
Denton (2 seats)
Party	Candidate	Votes	%	±%
Labour	Deborah Croxton	524	67.5	
Labour	Lee Croxton*	503	64.8	
Conservative	Ian Dibben	240	30.9	
Conservative	Stephen King	226	29.1	
Majority				
Turnout		776	21.62	
Labour win (new seat)				
Labour win (new seat)				

=== Higham and Shorne ===
Higham & Shorne (3 seats)
Party	Candidate	Votes	%	±%
Conservative	Leslie Pearton*	1,114	63.5	
Conservative	Helen Ashenden*	1,112	63.4	
Conservative	Jordan Meade*	1,075	61.3	
Labour	Sim Bains	447	25.5	
Labour	Yasmin Chotai de Lima	427	24.3	
Labour	Balbir Sangha	372	21.2	
Green	Janet Prior	340	19.4	
Majority				
Turnout		1,755	33.72	
Conservative win (new seat)				
Conservative win (new seat)				
Conservative win (new seat)				

=== Istead Rise, Cobham and Luddesdown ===
Istead Rise, Cobham & Luddesdown (2 seats)
Party	Candidate	Votes	%	±%
Conservative	Dakota Dibben*	1,142	74.3	+14.2
Conservative	Samir Jassal*	897	58.4	+2.5
Labour	Lewis Atkinson	385	25.1	
Labour	Mary Williams	368	24.0	
Majority				
Turnout		1,536	38.64	
Conservative win (new seat)				
Conservative win (new seat)				

=== Meopham North ===
Meopham North (2 seats)
Party	Candidate	Votes	%	±%
Conservative	Gary Harding*	629	58.5	+3.5
Conservative	Frank Wardle*	572	53.2	+1.3
Labour	Doug Christie	272	25.3	
Liberal Democrats	John Death	253	23.5	
Labour	Ethan Webb	158	14.7	
Reform	Garry Sturley	117	10.9	
Majority				
Turnout		1,076	40.20	
Conservative win (new seat)				
Conservative win (new seat)				

=== Meopham South and Vigo ===
Meopham South & Vigo (2 seats)
Party	Candidate	Votes	%	±%
Conservative	Mohammed Ejaz Aslam*	696	51.8	
Conservative	Gurjit Bains	641	47.7	
Liberal Democrats	Robin Banks	448	33.4	
Liberal Democrats	Dylan Black	339	25.2	
Labour	Chloe Saygili	168	12.5	
Labour	Kevin Divall	156	11.6	
Green	Diana Scott	129	9.6	
Majority				
Turnout		1,343	32.85	
Conservative win (new seat)				
Conservative win (new seat)				

=== Northfleet and Springhead ===
Northfleet & Springhead (3 seats)
Party	Candidate	Votes	%	±%
Labour	Jo Hart	705	52.6	
Labour	Peter Scollard*	674	50.3	
Labour	Alison Williams	659	49.2	
Conservative	Conrad Broadley	590	44.0	
Conservative	Bobby Briah	576	43.0	
Conservative	Jacob Hatch	517	38.6	
Majority				
Turnout		1,340	23.95	
Labour win (new seat)				
Labour win (new seat)				
Labour win (new seat)				

=== Painters Ash ===
Painters Ash (2 seats)
Party	Candidate	Votes	%	±%
Conservative	Emma Elliott*	761	51.1	+7.7
Conservative	Alan Ridgers	703	47.2	+4.4
Labour	Rob Halpin	688	46.2	+9.7
Labour	Gurvinder Saluja	669	44.9	
Majority				
Turnout		1,490	35.26	
Conservative win (new seat)				
Conservative win (new seat)				

=== Pelham ===
Pelham (2 seats)
Party	Candidate	Votes	%	±%
Labour	Emma Morley	800	63.8	
Labour	Baljit Hayre*	783	62.5	
Conservative	Heather Frost	290	23.1	
Conservative	Brenda Pritchard	269	21.5	
Green	Marc Prior	191	15.2	
Majority				
Turnout		1,253	30.04	
Labour win (new seat)				
Labour win (new seat)				

=== Riverview Park ===
Riverview Park (2 seats)
Party	Candidate	Votes	%	±%
Conservative	Derek Ashenden*	760	60.5	
Conservative	Aaron Elliott*	758	60.3	
Labour	Sue Fletcher	389	30.9	
Labour	Ben Archell	379	30.2	
Green	Martin Wilson	127	10.1	
Majority				
Turnout		1,257	31.10	
Conservative win (new seat)				
Conservative win (new seat)				

=== Rosherville ===
Rosherville (2 seats)
Party	Candidate	Votes	%	±%
Labour	John Burden	658	76.7	
Labour	Lauren Sullivan*	634	73.9	
Conservative	Jo McTavish	175	20.4	
Conservative	Anthony Pritchard	167	19.5	
Majority				
Turnout		858	25.41	
Labour win (new seat)				
Labour win (new seat)				

=== Singlewell ===
Singlewell (2 seats)
Party	Candidate	Votes	%	±%
Labour	Daniel King	515	54.0	
Labour	Rajinder Atwal	500	52.5	
Conservative	Diane Morton*	398	41.8	
Conservative	Stefan Dodd	389	40.8	
Majority				
Turnout		953	22.03	
Labour win (new seat)				
Labour win (new seat)				

=== Town ===
Town (3 seats)
Party	Candidate	Votes	%	±%
Labour	Gurdip Bungar*	868	58.6	
Labour	Lyn Milner*	841	56.7	
Labour	Jenny Wallace*	821	55.4	
Conservative	Thomas O'Keeffe	460	31.0	
Conservative	Iris Smith	436	29.4	
Conservative	Muqeem Khan	402	27.1	
Reform	Matthew Fraser Moat	123	8.3	
Reform	Daniel Dabin	80	5.4	
Majority				
Turnout		1,482	27.30	
Labour win (new seat)				
Labour win (new seat)				
Labour win (new seat)				

=== Westcourt ===
Westcourt (2 seats)
Party	Candidate	Votes	%	±%
Labour	Karina O'Malley	527	58.7	
Labour	Lenny Rolles	476	53.0	
Conservative	Hayley Hatch	359	40.0	
Conservative	Keima Allen	347	38.6	
Majority				
Turnout		898	21.64	
Labour win (new seat)				
Labour win (new seat)				

=== Whitehill and Windmill Hill ===
Whitehill & Windmill Hill (3 seats)
Party	Candidate	Votes	%	±%
Labour	Gavin Larkins	1,061	50.4	
Labour	Tony Rana*	1,052	50.0	
Labour	Ektaveen Thandi	1,000	47.5	
Conservative	Leslie Hoskins*	991	47.1	
Conservative	Michael Wenban	974	46.3	
Conservative	Partha Panda	916	43.5	
Majority				
Turnout		2,104	32.74	
Labour win (new seat)				
Labour win (new seat)				
Labour win (new seat)				

=== Woodlands ===
Woodlands (3 seats)
Party	Candidate	Votes	%	±%
Conservative	David Beattie	894	48.5	
Conservative	Alan Metcalf	874	47.4	
Conservative	Benjamin Sizer	840	45.6	
Labour	Tobias Cook	719	39.0	
Labour	Brian Francis	693	37.6	
Labour	Robert Duddridge	675	36.6	
Green	Amarbeer Gill	224	12.2	
Liberal Democrats	Ankit Mathur	125	6.8	
Liberal Democrats	Sharan Virk	117	6.4	
Liberal Democrats	Ukonu Obasi	113	6.1	
Majority				
Turnout		1,842	31.19	
Conservative win (new seat)				
Conservative win (new seat)				
Conservative win (new seat)				

== By-elections ==
=== Rosherville ===
Rosherville by-election: 1 May 2025
Party	Candidate	Votes	%	±%
Labour	Kimberley Glendenning	375	43.7	–35.3
Reform	John English	257	30.0	N/A
Conservative	Thomas O'Keeffe	133	15.5	–5.5
Green	James Eagle	93	10.8	N/A
Majority		118	13.7	N/A
Turnout		858		
Labour hold				
