= Tim Brinton =

British broadcaster and politician (1929–2009)

Member of Parliament for Gravesham (Gravesend 1979–1983)
- In office 3 May 1979 – 18 May 1987
- Preceded by: John Ovenden
- Succeeded by: Jacques Arnold

Personal details
- Born: Timothy Denis Brinton; 24 December 1929
- Died: 22 March 2009 (aged 79)
- Political party: UKIP (2003–2009); Conservative (until 2003)
- Spouses: Jane-Mari Coningham (m. 1954; div. 1965) Jeanne Wedge (m. 1965)
- Children: 6, including Sal
- Education: Eton College; Central School of Speech and Drama
- Alma mater: University of Geneva

Timothy Denis Brinton (24 December 1929 – 22 March 2009) was a British broadcaster and Conservative Party politician. The son of a neurologist, he was educated at Summer Fields School in Summertown, Oxford, followed by Eton College and the University of Geneva.

== Early life ==
Timothy Denis Brinton was born on 24 December 1929, the son of Dr Denis Brinton, a neurologist. He was educated at Summer Fields School in Summertown, Oxford, followed by Eton College and the University of Geneva. After national service with the Scots Guards, he studied acting and production at the Central School of Speech and Drama.

== Career ==
Brinton joined the BBC as an announcer and newsreader and moved in 1959 to ITN, where he was a newscaster until 1962. He was also a regular presenter of Roundabout on the BBC Light Programme between 1964 and 1967.

Brinton was a Kent County Councillor from 1974 to 1981 and Member of Parliament (MP) for the marginal seat of Gravesend from 1979 (gaining the seat from Labour) to 1983, and, following boundary changes, for the new Gravesham constituency from 1983 until he stood down in 1987. He was a member of the Education Select Committee from 1980 to 1983. In 2003, he became a member of the United Kingdom Independence Party (UKIP).

=== Alternative 3 ===
Brinton was the presenter and narrator of the mockumentary Alternative 3, and lent it the gravitas it needed to be a successful hoax. The programme had been due to be broadcast on April Fools' Day, 1977, but industrial action meant that it was broadcast in June. Sometimes cited as a British parallel to Orson Welles's radio production of The War of the Worlds, Alternative 3 purported to be an investigation into Britain's contemporary "brain drain". Alternative 3 was supposedly a plan to relocate a cross section of Earth's scientific and philosophical population to Mars in the event of climate change or some other planetary catastrophe. When the DVD was released in October, 2007, it had a 30-minute featurette in the extras, featuring an interview with Brinton, as well as his fellow "conspirators", David Ambrose and Christopher Miles who also directed Alternative 3, alongside a production stills gallery and contemporary press cuttings.

Tim Brinton was narrator for a film documentary called 'Murder Bag' from the 'Look At Life' series, on 35mm colour film stock. Filmed 1/1/1966. Filmed by Bill Hooker and Reg Coast, edited by Roy Drew, script by Wilfred Greatorex and Ex Producer, George Grafton Green.

== Personal life ==
He married Jane-Mari Coningham in 1954 (marriage dissolved, one son, three daughters, one of whom is the Liberal Democrat politician Sal Brinton), and in 1965 married Jeanne Frances Wedge (two daughters). He died on 22 March 2009, aged 79. After his death it was revealed that he had been suffering from Alzheimer's disease for five years.

== Filmography ==
- Information Received (1961) – TV announcer
- The Avengers (1962) TV announcer in M. Teddy Bear (season 2)
- Heavens Above! (1963) – TV Commentator (uncredited)
- The Counterfeit Constable (1964)
- Bunny Lake Is Missing (1965) – Newscaster
- Man at the Top (1973) – Newsreader
- Carry On Emmannuelle (1978) – BBC Newscaster (final film role)

Parliament of the United Kingdom
Preceded by John Ovenden	Member of Parliament for Gravesend; 1979–1983	Constituency abolished
New constituency	Member of Parliament for Gravesham; 1983–1987	Succeeded by Jacques Arnold
