= Gravesham Civic Centre =

Municipal building in Gravesend, Kent, England

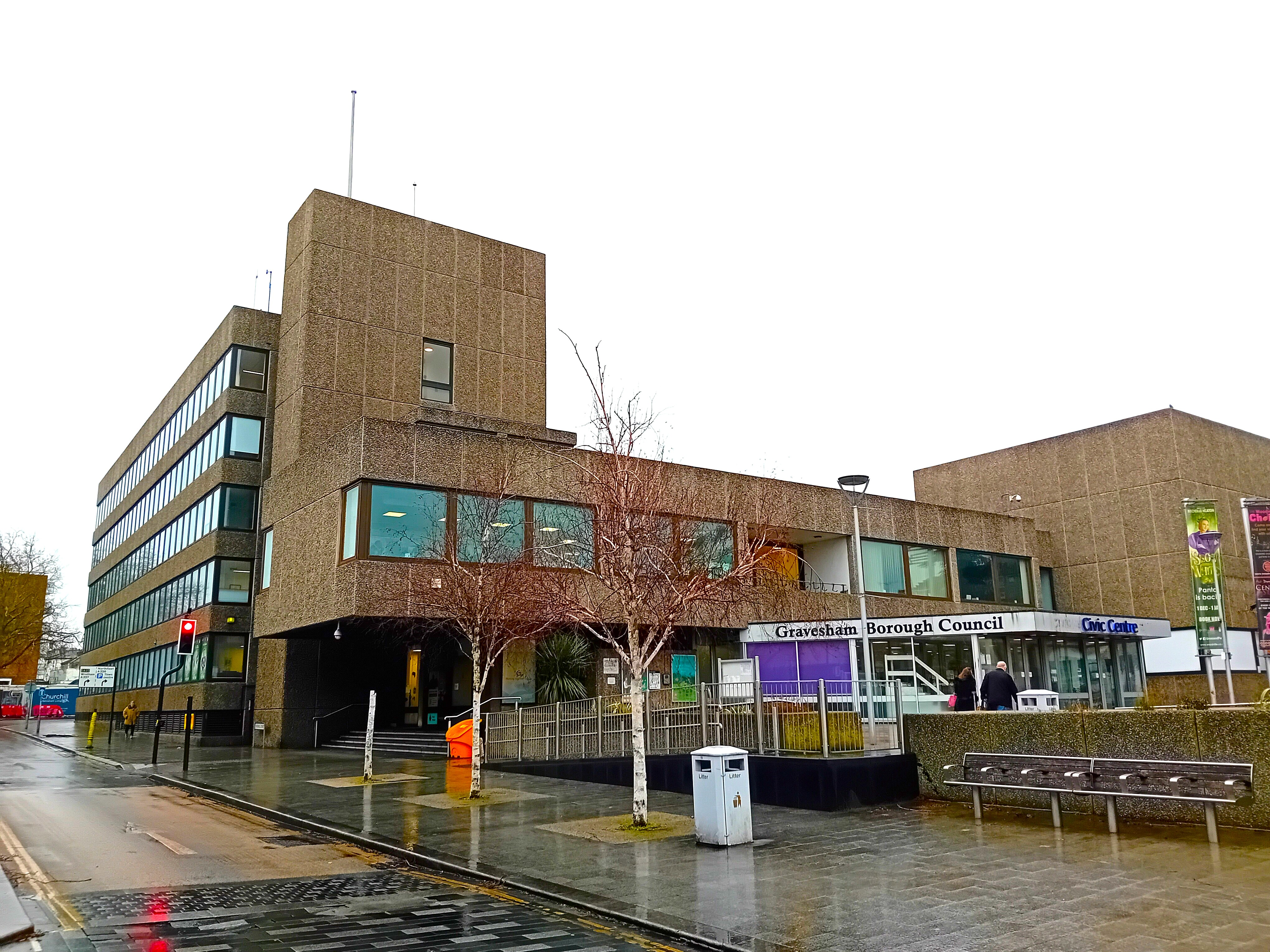
- The building in 2024

- Shown in Kent
- 51.4399°N 0.3685°E
- Location: Windmill Street, Gravesend

History
- Built: 1968

Site notes
- Architect: Brian Richards
- Architectural style: Modern style

Gravesham Civic Centre is a municipal building in Windmill Street in Gravesend, a town in Kent, in England. The building accommodates the offices and meeting place of Gravesham Borough Council.

== History ==
The building was commissioned by Gravesend Borough Council to replace Gravesend Town Hall in the High Street, which had served as the municipal headquarters of the borough since 1764. By the 1920s, the council had outgrown the hall, and it purchased various buildings around Wrotham Road to provide additional office space. These were cleared in the early 1960s, and work on the new building started in 1961. It was designed by Brian Richards, from the firm of Cadbury-Brown, which was led by Henry Thomas Cadbury-Brown. It was designed in the brutalist style, built in concrete and glass and was officially opened by Katharine, Duchess of Kent on 15 November 1968.

The design involved an asymmetrical main frontage facing north onto a new community square. At the centre of the main frontage there was a single-storey glass fronted entrance foyer. The left-hand section of the main frontage was recessed on the ground floor, allowing access to a six-storey stair well, which in turn led to a five-storey municipal office block behind. The right-hand section was projected forward and was blind, except for a row of casement windows on the ground floor, completely encasing the Woodville Halls Theatre behind. The first floor area above and behind the foyer was fenestrated with a row of casement windows, with concrete panels above and below. The principal room in the complex was the council chamber which was located in the civic suite, behind the first floor casement windows.

The building continued to serve as the headquarters of the old Gravesend Borough Council for another six years and then became the headquarters of the enlarged Gravesham Borough Council in 1974. In 2005, the Twentieth Century Society proposed that the building should be added to the National Heritage List for England on the basis that it was a "good brutalist design", but the proposal was not taken up by Historic England. A major programme of refurbishment works, involving the creation of new open-plan offices and an enlarged customer service area, was carried out at a cost of £6 million in 2011. In addition, an anti-carbonation coating was applied to the external concrete panels at a cost of £250,000 in 2016.

Works of art in the civic centre include a portrait of Queen Alexandra by Henry Weigall, a portrait of Alderman James Harmer by Thomas Brigstocke and a portrait of the former mayor, Frederick Beckley Nettleingham, by Isaac Snowman. There are also portraits of three former mayors, Henry Edward Davies, Henry Huggins and John Russell, by James Clark and a landscape painting of a tree in front of a lake by Graham Petrie.
