= Alternative 3 =

1977 television mockumentary

- Also known as: Science Report: Alternative 3
- Genre: Mockumentary; Science fiction
- Developed by: David Ambrose; Christopher Miles
- Written by: David Ambrose
- Directed by: Christopher Miles
- Starring: Tim Brinton; Gregory Munroe; Carol Hazell; Shane Rimmer; Richard Marner
- Composer: Brian Eno
- Country of origin: United Kingdom
- Original language: English

Production
- Running time: 52 minutes
- Production company: Anglia Television

Original release
- Release: 20 June 1977

Alternative 3 is a 1977 British television mockumentary concerning government conspiracies. It inspired much speculation and interest by proponents of fringe ideas.

== Premise ==
Purporting to be an investigation of the disappearance of a number of scientists, Alternative 3 describes a plan to make the Moon and Mars habitable in the event of climate change and environmental catastrophe on Earth.

== Production ==
The script was written by David Ambrose. Music was supplied by Brian Eno, a portion of his score being released on his album Music for Films (1978). Apart from the presenter Tim Brinton, all characters were played by actors who were explicitly credited at the end. It was made with film stock used at the time to make it appear like a conventional documentary programme. In a 1989 interview, actor Richard Marner (who plays Dr. Carl Gerstein) said he did not rehearse his lines to make the delivery appear as natural as possible.

== Broadcast ==
The programme was presented as an edition of an Anglia series Science Report.

Having aired once in the United Kingdom, Alternative 3 was later aired in Australia, Canada, and New Zealand. The programme was originally meant to be aired on 1 April, April Fools' Day, 1977, but its broadcast was delayed to 20 June. Alternative 3 ended with credits for the actors involved in the production and featured interviews with a fictitious American astronaut.

== Plot ==
The programme begins by detailing the so-called "brain drain": a number of mysterious disappearances and deaths of physicists, engineers, astronomers, and others in related fields. Among the strange deaths reported was that of "Professor Ballantine" of Jodrell Bank. Before his death, Ballantine had delivered a videotape to a friend in the press, but upon playback the tape appears to contain only static.

The missing scientists are revealed to have been involved in a secret American-Soviet plan. Interplanetary space travel had been possible for much longer than was commonly accepted, with Bob Grodin, a fictional Apollo astronaut (Shane Rimmer) claiming to have stumbled onto a mysterious lunar base during his moonwalk. It is then revealed that, during the 1950s, scientists had secretly determined that the Earth's surface would be unable to support life for much longer, due to pollution leading to catastrophic climate change. In 1957, physicist Dr Carl Gerstein (Richard Marner) proposed three solutions. The first was the drastic reduction of the human population on Earth. The second was the construction of vast underground shelters to house government officials and a cross section of the population until the climate had stabilised, a solution reminiscent of the one proposed at the finale of Dr Strangelove. The so-called Alternative 3, revealed to have been secretly undertaken, was colonisation of Mars via a way station on the Moon.

The programme ends with some detective work; acting on information from Grodin, the reporters learn that Ballantine's videotape requires a special decoding device. After locating the decoder, the video documents a joint American and Soviet landing of an unmanned probe on the Martian surface in 1962. After landing, the camera focuses on an unknown organism moving under the surface of the ground. According to a mission controller, "22nd May, 1962, we're on the planet Mars and we have life!"

== Reception ==
Nick Austin, then editorial director at Sphere Books (publisher of the novelization), writes that he was both delighted and disturbed by the Alternative 3 controversy, and adds that the reasons "a clever hoax, openly admitted to be such by its creators, should continue to exercise the fascination it so obviously does the best part of a generation after its first appearance is beyond my feeble powers of analysis and explanation."

== Related texts ==
=== Authorised ===
In 1978, a tie-in "nonfiction" book written by Leslie Watkins with David Ambrose and Christopher Miles, appeared from Sphere Books Ltd, of London. An American edition, also marketed as nonfiction, appeared from Avon Books, with the title stylised as Alternative 003. The novelisation added further detail to many of the claims presented in the show, with some changes. Rather than fictional astronauts like Bob Grodin, it included bogus quotes from real ones such as Buzz Aldrin and Edgar Mitchell. Instead of the astronauts discovering primitive life on Mars, they discover a breathable atmosphere. The book further claimed that the conspirators have been engaged in shipping staff to a secret base on Mars, abducting potential workers to use as slaves.

=== Unauthorised ===
Jim Keith's Casebook on Alternative 3: UFOs, Secret Societies and World Control argues that some elements of the 1977 broadcast were in fact true.

Ken Mitchell's novel Alternative 3 uses the Alternative 3 scenario as a background to a techno thriller.

On 20 June 2010, the 33rd anniversary of the original Anglia Television broadcast, an unofficial, allegedly "unexpurgated" eBook version of Watkins' book "edited by Anonymous" and published by "Archimedes Press" appeared online. It contained a new foreword and other material.

== DVD release ==
The film was released on DVD in October 2007, together with a 30-minute featurette with presenter Tim Brinton and writers David Ambrose and Christopher Miles the production's director, a production stills gallery; and contemporary press cuttings. The film is taken from a 16 mm print with optical sound. According to Miles in the featurette, this is his personal copy, and the only one to have survived.

== Possible influences on the mockumentary ==
"The Man in the Moon", a 14 July 1950 episode of the American radio science fiction anthology Dimension X featured a similar story. Here, an employee of the fictional United States Bureau of Missing Persons overhears a radio broadcast from a man who claims to be held prisoner on the Moon. The employee investigates, and uncovers the kidnapping of many persons, including scientists and engineers, who are then forced to toil on the Moon by German overseers, who had colonised the Moon in the late 1930s, and are preparing an invasion and takeover of the Earth.

== References in popular culture ==
Canadian musician Ian Thomas has stated that the lyrics to his 1979 hit "Pilot" were inspired from watching Alternative 3.

The track "Vats of Goo" on the OST for the 1997 video game Fallout is a cover of Alternative 3's theme.

British doom metal band Anathema's 1998 album Alternative 4 was also named after the programme.

Rock band Monster Magnet have a song about the conspiracy, titled "Third Alternative" on their Dopes to Infinity album.

The song "Alternative Three" on the album Karma Had It Coming by Canadian punk rock band The Broomhandles takes inspiration from the programme.

An alternative soundtrack for the film by members of Add N to (X), Stereolab and Hairy Butter was released on Lo Recordings in 2001.

Costa Botes cited Alternative 3 as one of the influences that inspired him to produce the New Zealand mockumentary Forgotten Silver with Peter Jackson.

A character in Richard Linklater's 1991 film Slacker, portrayed by Jerry Delony, claims that Alternative 3 is "absolutely true" and that humans have been on Mars since 1962.

UK punk rock band UFX released a video using allegedly hoax footage from Alternative 3, the Roswell alien autopsy and footage of Nazi flying saucers to accompany the title track of their 2013 album Reverse Engineering.
