= Chris Pond =

British politician (born 1952)

Member of Parliament for Gravesham
- In office 1 May 1997 – 11 April 2005
- Preceded by: Jacques Arnold
- Succeeded by: Adam Holloway

Personal details
- Born: 25 September 1952 (age 73)
- Party: Labour
- Spouse: Lorraine Pond

Christopher Richard Pond (born 25 September 1952) is a former Labour Party politician in the United Kingdom. He was Member of Parliament (MP) for Gravesham in Kent, from 1997 to 2005.

== Early life ==
He went to the Minchenden School (became comprehensive in 1967, and was merged into the Broomfield School in 1984) in Southgate, London. At the University of Sussex, he gained a BA in economics in 1974.

From 1974 to 1975, he was a research assistant in Economics at Birkbeck College. From 1975 to 1979, he was a research officer at the Low Pay Unit, and subsequently became its director, taking over from Frank Field. He lectured in economics at the Civil Service College (now called the National School of Government) from 1979 to 1980. From 1981 to 1982, he was a visiting lecturer in economics at the University of Kent. At the University of Surrey, he was a visiting professor from 1984 to 1986, a role he subsequently took on at Middlesex University. He was a consultant for the Open University from 1987 to 1988, and 1991–2.

== Parliamentary career ==
At the 1987 general election, Pond unsuccessfully contested the Welwyn Hatfield constituency.

He won the Gravesham seat at the 1997 general election, beating the sitting Conservative Party MP, Jacques Arnold. He was re-elected at the 2001 general election, and served as a member of the Social Security Select Committee, Parliamentary Private Secretary in the Treasury and then minister in the Department for Work and Pensions.

Pond introduced a Private Members Bill, the Employment of Children Bill in 1998, which subsequently led to greater protection for children at work. He successfully campaigned with the Marchioness Action Group for a Public Inquiry into the sinking of the Marchioness, for greater safety measures and for the introduction of lifeboats on the Thames. At the May 2005 general election, he lost his seat in Parliament to the Conservative Party candidate, Adam Holloway, who secured a majority of 654.

In February 2005, Pond was arrested by the police after an alleged incident of criminal damage. He had removed a sign illegally threatening to clamp his heavily pregnant wife's car and placed it on the door of a neighbour who he believed had been responsible, leaving traces of glue. After the decision whether to prosecute him was referred to the director of public prosecutions and to the attorney general, Lord Goldsmith, Pond received a police caution.

After being defeated in the 2005 election, Pond was appointed as chief executive of The National Council for One Parent Families, which subsequently merged to become Gingerbread. In 2007 he became director of financial capability at the Financial Services Authority. where he led the establishment of the Money Advice Service, becoming its interim CEO before leaving the FSA in 2012. Between 2005 and 2009, he was chair of Capacitybuilders, a Home Office and then Cabinet Office sponsored funding agency for charities and social enterprises. Between 2009 and 2013, he was an independent member of the HMRC Ethics and Responsibility Committee. He was also a trustee of the End Child Poverty Campaign and of the National Family and Parenting Institute, which subsequently became the Family and Childcare Trust. On leaving the FSA, he was appointed as a Partner and Head of UK Public Affairs for Kreab, an international communications agency, which he left in December 2016.

He is now chairman of the Lending Standards Board (a body established to promote good practice in lending to consumers and small businesses) and of the Equity Release Council Standards Board. He also serves as vice-chair of the independent Financial Inclusion Commission, which he helped establish in 2014. He also serves as chair of The Money Charity and of the Caxton Foundation (a Department of Health-funded charity to provide support for those infected with Hepatitis-C following NHS treatment) and is an independent director of Cape Claims Services, an asbestos compensation scheme which has paid out over £30 million in compensation in its 10 years of existence. He is trustee of GambleAware and Z2K, a charity established to combat poverty and inequality in London. He is also a member of the Treasury Fintech Delivery Panel.

== Personal life ==
He married Carole Tongue in 1990. They have one daughter, but divorced in 1999. He is now married to Lorraine (former councillor and mayor of Tower Hamlets). They have a daughter aged 17 and a son aged 14.

Chris has run 19 marathons, eleven of them in London, raising thousands for charity. He ran the London Marathon again in April 2009 in support of Gingerbread (the charity for lone parents), Macmillan Cancer Care and United Response (the learning disability and mental health charity) and in 2011 in support of Prostate Cancer UK.

== Notes ==
Parliament of the United Kingdom
Preceded by Jacques Arnold	Member of Parliament for Gravesham; 1997–2005	Succeeded by Adam Holloway
