= Gravesham (constituency) =

UK Parliament constituency (since 1983)

Coordinates: 51°24′N 0°22′E

- County constituency for the House of Commons
- Boundaries since 1983
- Boundary of Gravesham in South East England
- County: Kent
- Electorate: 72,866 (2023)
- Major settlements: Gravesend, Northfleet

Current constituency
- Created: 1983
- Member of Parliament: Lauren Sullivan (Labour)
- Seats: One
- Created from: Gravesend

Gravesham (/ˈɡreɪvʃəm/) is a constituency in Kent, represented in the House of Commons of the UK Parliament by Lauren Sullivan of the Labour Party since the 2024 general election.

== Constituency profile ==
The Gravesham constituency is located in Kent and is coterminous with the local government district of the same name. It contains the connected towns of Gravesend and Northfleet and the rural areas to their south and east, including the villages of Higham, Istead Rise and Meopham. The area forms the eastern limit of London's wider urban area and has been targeted for regeneration and urbanisation as part of the Thames Gateway. Gravesend and Northfleet lie on the south bank of the River Thames and have a maritime history. High levels of deprivation are present in both towns whilst the surrounding villages are wealthier. House prices in the constituency are similar to the national average but lower than the rest of South East England.

In general, residents of Gravesham have low levels of education and professional employment. Household income is lower than the regional average. White people made up 77% of the population at the 2021 census. Asians, mostly Indians, form the largest ethnic minority group at 11% and Black people are 7%. At the local borough council, the central parts of Gravesend and Northfleet are represented by the Labour Party whilst the suburban and rural neighbourhoods elected Conservatives. At the county council, which held elections more recently, all seats in Gravesham are represented by Reform UK. Voters in the constituency strongly supported leaving the European Union in the 2016 referendum; an estimated 65% voted in favour of Brexit compared to 52% nationwide.

== Boundaries ==
1983–present: The Borough of Gravesham wards of: Central; Chalk; Coldharbour; Higham; Istead Rise; Meopham North; Meopham South and Vigo; Northfleet North; Northfleet South; Painters Ash; Pelham; Riverside; Riverview; Shorne, Cobham and Luddesdown; Singlewell; Westcourt, Whitehill; Woodlands.

Since the constituency's creation, its boundaries have been co-terminous with those of the Borough of Gravesham. The largest town in the constituency is Gravesend.

The 2023 periodic review of Westminster constituencies left the boundaries unchanged.

== History ==
This particular name of the seat was created in 1983 effectively as the new name for the Gravesend seat.

The constituency and its predecessor together can be considered a bellwether seat: from World War I, with the exceptions of the General Elections in 1929, 1951 and 2005, its winner came from the winning party nationally. (Note: Nonetheless, in the 1929 and 1951 elections, the seat elected into office the candidate from the party with the largest national share of the vote) In 2005, Adam Holloway was one of 36 Conservative candidates to gain a seat from other parties; he held the seat until 2024, when Labour gained it for the first time in 19 years with the election of Lauren Sullivan as MP.

== Members of Parliament ==
Gravesend prior to 1983

Elections	Member	Party
1983	Tim Brinton	Conservative
1987, 1992	Jacques Arnold	Conservative
1997, 2001	Chris Pond	Labour
2005, 2010, 2015, 2017, 2019	Adam Holloway	Conservative
2024	Lauren Sullivan	Labour

== Elections ==
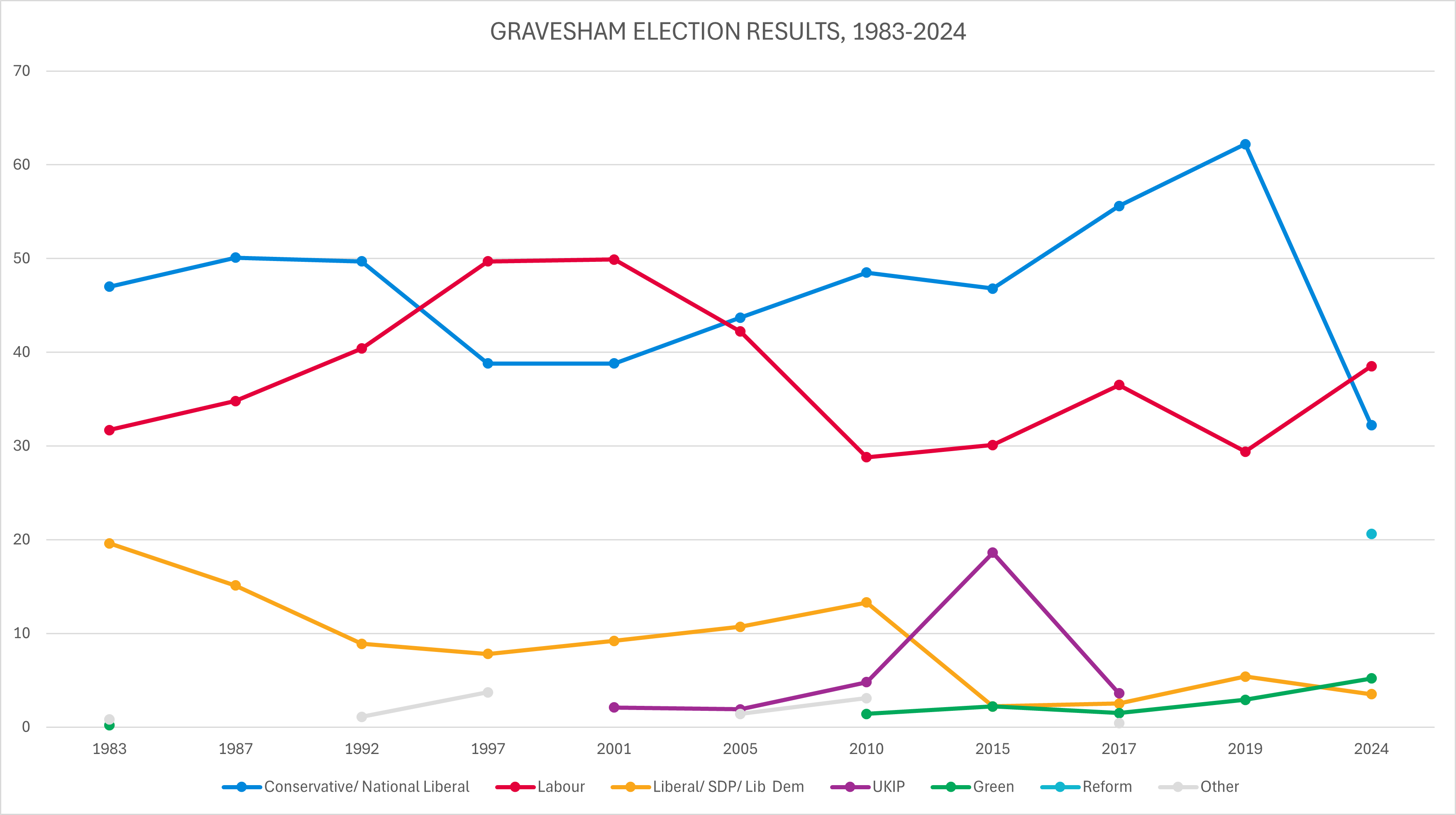
Election results 1983-2024

=== Elections in the 2020s ===
General election 2024: Gravesham
Party	Candidate	Votes	%	±%
Labour	Lauren Sullivan	16,623	38.5	+9.1
Conservative	Adam Holloway	13,911	32.2	−30.0
Reform	Matthew Fraser Moat	8,910	20.6	New
Green	Rebecca Hopkins	2,254	5.2	+2.3
Liberal Democrats	Ukonu Obasi	1,534	3.5	−1.9
Majority		2,712	6.3	N/A
Turnout		43,232	59.0	−6.1
Labour gain from Conservative		Swing	+19.5	

=== Elections in the 2010s ===
2019 general election: Gravesham
Party	Candidate	Votes	%	±%
Conservative	Adam Holloway	29,580	62.2	+6.6
Labour	Lauren Sullivan	13,999	29.4	−7.1
Liberal Democrats	Ukonu Obasi	2,584	5.4	+2.9
Green	Marna Gilligan	1,397	2.9	+1.4
Majority		15,581	32.8	+13.7
Turnout		47,560	64.9	−2.3
Conservative hold		Swing	+6.8	

2017 general election: Gravesham
Party	Candidate	Votes	%	±%
Conservative	Adam Holloway	27,237	55.6	+8.8
Labour	Mandy Garford	17,890	36.5	+6.4
UKIP	Emmanuel Feyisetan	1,742	3.6	−15.0
Liberal Democrats	James Willis	1,210	2.5	+0.3
Green	Marna Gilligan	723	1.5	−0.8
Independent	Michael Rogan	195	0.4	New
Majority		9,347	19.1	+2.4
Turnout		49,106	67.2	−0.3
Conservative hold		Swing	+1.2	

2015 general election: Gravesham
Party	Candidate	Votes	%	±%
Conservative	Adam Holloway	23,484	46.8	−1.7
Labour	Tanmanjeet Singh Dhesi	15,114	30.1	+1.3
UKIP	Sean Marriott	9,306	18.6	+13.8
Green	Mark Lindop	1,124	2.2	+0.8
Liberal Democrats	Anne-Marie Bunting	1,111	2.2	−11.1
Majority		8,370	16.7	−3.0
Turnout		50,139	67.5	+0.1
Conservative hold		Swing	−1.5	

2010 general election: Gravesham
Party	Candidate	Votes	%	±%
Conservative	Adam Holloway	22,956	48.5	+4.8
Labour Co-op	Kathryn Smith	13,644	28.8	−13.4
Liberal Democrats	Anna Arrowsmith	6,293	13.3	+2.6
UKIP	Geoffrey Clark	2,265	4.8	+2.9
English Democrat	Steve Uncles	1,005	2.1	New
Green	Richard Crawford	675	1.4	New
Independent	Alice Dartnell	465	1.0	New
Majority		9,312	19.7	+18.2
Turnout		47,303	67.4	+1.6
Conservative hold		Swing	+9.1	

=== Elections in the 2000s ===
2005 general election: Gravesham
Party	Candidate	Votes	%	±%
Conservative	Adam Holloway	19,739	43.7	+4.9
Labour	Chris Pond	19,085	42.2	−7.7
Liberal Democrats	Bruce Parmenter	4,851	10.7	+1.5
UKIP	Geoff Coates	850	1.9	−0.2
English Independence Party	Christopher Nickerson	654	1.4	New
Majority		654	1.5	N/A
Turnout		45,179	65.8	+3.1
Conservative gain from Labour		Swing	+6.3	

2001 general election: Gravesham
Party	Candidate	Votes	%	±%
Labour	Chris Pond	21,773	49.9	+0.2
Conservative	Jacques Arnold	16,911	38.8	0.0
Liberal Democrats	Bruce Parmenter	4,031	9.2	+1.5
UKIP	William Jenner	924	2.1	New
Majority		4,862	11.1	+0.3
Turnout		43,639	62.7	−14.2
Labour hold		Swing	+0.1	

=== Elections in the 1990s ===
1997 general election: Gravesham
Party	Candidate	Votes	%	±%
Labour	Chris Pond	26,460	49.7	+9.3
Conservative	Jacques Arnold	20,681	38.8	−10.9
Liberal Democrats	Merilyn Canet	4,128	7.8	−1.1
Referendum	Patricia Curtis	1,441	2.7	New
Independent Labour	Anthony Leyshon	414	0.8	New
Natural Law	David Palmer	129	0.2	New
Majority		5,779	10.9	N/A
Turnout		53,253	76.9	−6.5
Labour gain from Conservative		Swing	-10.1	

1992 general election: Gravesham
Party	Candidate	Votes	%	±%
Conservative	Jacques Arnold	29,322	49.7	−0.4
Labour	Graham A. Green	23,829	40.4	+5.6
Liberal Democrats	Derek R. Deedman	5,269	8.9	−6.2
Independent	AJ Bunstone	273	0.5	New
Ind. Conservative	REB Khilkoff-Boulding	187	0.3	New
Independent Socialist	BJ Buxton	174	0.3	New
Majority		5,493	9.3	−6.0
Turnout		59,054	83.4	+4.1
Conservative hold		Swing	−3.0	

=== Elections in the 1980s ===
1987 general election: Gravesham
Party	Candidate	Votes	%	±%
Conservative	Jacques Arnold	28,891	50.1	+3.1
Labour	Martin Coleman	20,099	34.8	+3.1
Liberal (Alliance)	Robert Crawford	8,724	15.1	−4.5
Majority		8,792	15.3	−0.2
Turnout		57,714	79.3	+2.3
Conservative hold		Swing	0.0	

1983 general election: Gravesham
Party	Candidate	Votes	%	±%
Conservative	Tim Brinton	25,968	47.0	
Labour	John Ovenden	17,505	31.7	
SDP (Alliance)	M Horton	10,826	19.6	
Ecology	Martin Sewell	495	0.2	
National Front	P Johnson	420	0.8	
Majority		8,463	15.5	
Turnout		55,214	77.6	
Conservative win (new seat)				

== See also ==
- List of parliamentary constituencies in Kent
- List of parliamentary constituencies in the South East England (region)
