= Woodville Halls Theatre =

Coordinates: 51°26′25″N 0°22′07″E

Woodville Halls Theatre is a venue located in Gravesend, England. Based on the site of the Civic Centre the Halls are a venue in their own right. There is an 810-seat auditorium which acts as a space for theatre, concerts, banquets, weddings and trade shows. Underneath the main auditorium is another studio space seating up to 150 and The Blake Art Gallery. Private function rooms, Spotlites Cafe and a bar are available for patrons to use.

The venue was renamed simply 'The Woodville' in 2013. In 2014 a new large-screen Dolby 7.1 cinema (including 3D) was installed, named after the director Paul Greengrass.

Woodville Halls is run by a general manager who reports to Gravesham Borough Council. The aim of the venue is to host performances, events and exhibitions for the community of Gravesend and beyond.

Built in the early 1970s, the venue is a reminder of architecture of the time.
