= David Ambrose =

British novelist and screenwriter

- Born: 21 February 1943 (age 83); Chorley, England
- Education: Merton College, Oxford
- Occupations: Novelist, playwright and screenwriter
- Spouse: Laurence Ambrose (m. 1979; died 2019)
- Writing career
- Language: English
- Notable work: Alternative 3
- Notable awards: Screenplay for The Survivor won the Best Script award at the International Film Festival of Catalonia

David Edwin Ambrose (born 21 February 1943) is a British novelist, playwright and screenwriter. His credits include at least twenty films, four stage plays, and many hours of television, including the controversial mockumentary Alternative 3 (1977). He was born in Chorley, Lancashire, and educated at Blackburn Grammar School and Merton College, Oxford. He was married to the Swiss-born artist Laurence Ambrose from 1979 until her death in 2019.

== Early life ==
After passing the eleven-plus, Ambrose attended Queen Elizabeth's Grammar School, Blackburn, between 1954 and 1961. From 1962 until 1965 he studied law at Merton College, Oxford. While there he wrote two plays which were successfully performed (one winning an OUDS prize for best college production) as well as directing and acting in several productions. He was also a frequent debater in the Oxford Union Society, where he served a term on standing committee.

Despite winning a mock trial in front of a high court judge while still an undergraduate, resulting in an offer of excellent chambers to begin a career at the bar, he chose to try his luck in show business.

== Career ==
=== Early career ===
For three years he supported himself by freelance journalism, mainly for The Observer, for which he wrote book reviews and conducted “Arts” interviews with subjects including Peggy Ashcroft, Robert Bolt, Neil Simon, Harold Pinter and Alec Guinness. He was also, briefly, artistic director of the new Adeline Genee Theatre in Surrey.

Throughout this period he had been writing plays and film scripts, one of which was bought by Dirk Bogarde (though never produced), and two of which were successfully produced by a major television company (ATV).

In early 1968, a few weeks after his twenty-fifth birthday, he was hired to re-write the entire script of a Roman epic which was about to start shooting in Romania under the direction of Hollywood veteran Robert Siodmak. It led with a cast headed by Laurence Harvey, Orson Welles, Sylva Koscina and Honor Blackman.

This encounter led to a lasting friendship with Welles, who took the young writer under his wing, and imparted many invaluable tips about his craft. As Ambrose writes in his memoir, “A Fate Worse Than Hollywood” (Zuleika Publishing, 2019), “I was… getting a one-on-one course on screenwriting from Orson Welles. Not a privilege enjoyed by many, I suspect. Of course, being young, I took it all for granted at the time; and, indeed, Orson made it seem like the most natural thing in the world”.

In 1972, his first stage play, “Siege”, was produced in London’s West End, starring Alastair Sim, Stanley Holloway, and Michael Bryant.

In 1974, he scripted the international feature film “The Fifth Musketeer”, directed by Ken Annakin, with a cast including Rex Harrison, Ursula Andress and Olivia de Havilland. Aside from these two ventures he wrote, between 1969 and 1977, around a hundred hours of UK television. In addition to single plays, he contributed to popular series such as “Colditz”, “Justice”, “Hadleigh”, “Public Eye”, “Oil Strike North”, and “Orson Welles Great Mysteries”.

In 1977, he wrote the fake documentary “Alternative 3”, an only slightly tongue-in-cheek story about an international effort to escape a doomed Planet Earth and establish a survivors’ colony on Mars. The show became a worldwide sensation. Several books have been written about it, and it is still referenced widely in literature and film. “The Guinness Book of Television Facts and Feats” (1984) described it as “The biggest hoax in television drama. In a way reminiscent of the scare caused by Orson Welles’s radio spoof, War of the Worlds in 1938.” Many viewers took it to be the literal truth and telephoned TV stations, newspapers, and even government offices in alarm.

=== Hollywood career ===
After “Alternative 3” Ambrose was approached by a leading Hollywood agent and paid his first visit there in August 1977. Within days, he was sitting with Gene Roddenberry, the creator of “Star Trek”, working on future story concepts and doing uncredited (minor) re-writes on the first feature film. Coincidentally, William Shatner (Captain Kirk), would play the lead in his next project, a feature-length TV movie called “Disaster on the Coastliner”. The supporting cast included Yvette Mimieux, Raymond Burr, Lloyd Bridges and E. G. Marshall.

He went on to work with a number of Hollywood Golden Age stars in their later careers, including Richard Widmark, David Niven, Joseph Cotten, James Mason, and in particular Kirk Douglas, for whom he scripted The Final Countdown (1980). He went on to work with modern stars including Pierce Brosnan (“Taffin”, 1988), and Sharon Stone (“Year of the Gun”, 1991, directed by John Frankenheimer).

=== Europe and worldwide ===
In 1980, his script for “The Survivor”, shot in Australia with Robert Powell. Jenny Agutter and Joseph Cotten, and directed by David Hemmings, won the best script award at the Sitges International Film Festival.

Also in 1982, in Australia, his script “A Dangerous Summer” (co-written with Kit Denton, Quentin Masters and Jim McElroy) was shot starring James Mason and Tom Skerritt.

In 1987, Ambrose directed his own script for “Comeback”, produced in the UK by Yorkshire Television, starring Anton Rodgers and Stephen Dillane. The film was nominated for the Prix Italia.

In 1989, Amborse was invited to France to script a six-hour, two-part film telling the story of “The French Revolution”. Directed by Robert Enrico and Richard Heffron, with an international cast including Peter Ustinov, Klaus-Maria Brandauer, Sam Neill, Claudia Cardinale, Christopher Lee and Jane Seymour, it was one of the biggest projects ever mounted in Europe.

=== Later career ===
Ambrose published his first novel, “The Man Who Turned Into Himself” in 1993. This was followed by five others, described as "Hitchcock meets Hawking", over the next ten years, along with a collection of short stories “Hollywood Lies”.

In 1990, his play Abra-Cadaver (co-written with Allan Scott) was produced at the Theatre Royal, Windsor, starring Frank Langella.

In 1991, his play Restoration Comedy (co-written with Michael Gearin-Tosh) was produced in Oxford.

In 2016, his play“Act 3… (co-written with Claudia Nellens) was produced at the Laguna Beach Theatre in California starring Rita Rudner and Charles Shaughnessy.

In November 2019, Zuleika Publishing published his memoir A Fate Worse Than Hollywood.

== Bibliography ==
=== Novels ===
- The Man Who Turned Into Himself, Jonathan Cape, 1993 (UK); reissued by MacMillan (Picador) in 2008
- Mother of God, Macmillan, 1995 (UK); Simon & Schuster, 1996 (US)
- Superstition, Macmillan, 1997 (UK); Warner Books, 1998 (US)
- The Discrete Charm of Charlie Monk, Macmillan, 2000 (UK)
- Coincidence, Macmillan, 2001 (UK); Warner Books, 2002 (US)
- A Memory of Demons, Macmillan, 2003 (UK); Pocket Books, 2004 (US)
- Twisted, Simon & Schuster, 2013 (UK); Simon & Schuster, 2013 (US)

=== Short stories ===
- Hollywood Lies, Macmillan, 1996 (UK); Pan, 1998; Reprinted Pocket Books, 2008 (US)

=== Autobiography ===
- A Fate Worse Than Hollywood, Zuleika Publishing, 2019

== Filmography ==
=== Films ===
- Year of the Gun (1991) – screenplay
- La Révolution française (1989) – screenplay
- Taffin (1988) – screenplay
- D.A.R.Y.L. (1985) – screenplay
- Blackout (1985) – screenplay
- Amityville 3-D (1983) – screenplay (as William Wales)
- The Final Countdown (1980) – story, screenplay
- The Survivor (1980) – screenplay
- A Dangerous Summer (1980) – screenplay
- A Man Called Intrepid (1979) – screenplay
- The Fifth Musketeer (1974) – screenplay

=== TV specials ===
- Alternative 3 (1977) – original screenplay

=== TV feature-length films ===
- Remembrance (1996) – screenplay
- Fall From Grace (1994) – screenplay
- Comeback (1987) – screenplay/director
- Disaster on the Coastliner (1979) – screenplay

=== TV series ===
- Justice – chief writer, two series
- Hadleigh – chief writer, two series
- Colditz – episodes
- Public Eye – episodes
- Oil Strike North – episodes
- Orson Welles Great Mysteries – episodes

=== TV drama (UK) ===
- Nanny's Boy (1976) – writer
- A Variety of Passion (1975) – writer
- Goose with Pepper (1975) – writer
- Love Me to Death (1974) – writer
- Reckoning Day (1973) – writer
- When the Music Stops (1972) – writer
- The Professional (1972) – writer
- The Undoing (1970) – writer
- The Innocent Ceremony (1970) – writer
- Public Face (1969) – writer

== Stage plays ==
- Siege (1972) Cambridge Theatre, London, with Alastair Sim, Stanley Holloway and Michael Bryant
- Abra-Cadaver (1990), UK, with Frank Langella
- Restoration Comedy (1991), Oxford
- Act 3 (2016), Laguna Beach Theatre, California, with Rita Rudner and Charles Shaughnessy.
