= Collateral (kinship) =

Kinship term

Collateral, in kinship, are kin, or lines of kin, that are not in a direct line of descent. Examples of collateral relatives include siblings of parents or grandparents and their descendants (uncles, aunts, and cousins). Collateral descent is contrasted with lineal descent: those related directly by a line of descent such as the children, grandchildren, great-grandchildren, etc. of an individual. Though both forms are consanguineal (blood relations), collaterals are neither ancestors nor descendants of a given person. In legal terminology, 'collateral descendant' refers to relatives descended from a sibling of an ancestor, and thus a niece, nephew, or cousin.

== See also ==
- Lineal descent
- Bilateral descent
- Kinship
- Genealogy
- Rota system (collateral succession)
- Agnatic seniority
