= Gurdip Bungar =

British politician

Councillor Gurdip Bungar

Mayor Gravesham Borough Council
- Incumbent
- Assumed office May 2023

Mayor Gravesham Borough Council
- In office May 2019 – May 2020

Deputy Mayor of Gravesham Borough Council
- In office May 2014 – May 2015

Personal details
- Born: Palahi, Phagwara, India
- Party: Labour

Gurdip Bungar is a British-Indian politician, community leader and businessman based in Gravesham, Kent, United Kingdom. He is the only mayor of Gravesham Council who has been elected twice.

== Biography ==
=== Early life ===
Bungar was born in Ravidassia family of Palahi village in the Jalandhar district of Punjab, India. He moved to the UK in December 1961 without knowing English but gradually worked his way through education, completing GCE O Levels, an engineering apprenticeship, and a Higher National Diploma.

=== Politics ===
Bungar joined the Labour Party and was elected as a councillor for the Town ward of Gravesham Borough Council. In 2019, he made history by becoming the first Dalit mayor of Gravesham, a position he was again entrusted with in 2023, reflecting his popularity and service-oriented approach. Prior to being appointed twice as a mayor, he also served as deputy mayor of Gravesham Borough Council. Throughout his career, he has served on several key council committees, including Housing, Licensing, Planning, and Standards, while continuing to champion inclusivity and social justice within his constituency.

He is executive member of Gurdwara Guru Ravidass, Gravesend and during the COVID pandemic period, he encouraged same Gurdwara, to donate 10,000 pounds to Darent Valley Hospital.
