= Adam Holloway =

British politician (born 1965)

Lord Commissioner of HM Treasury
- In office 6 September 2022 – 25 October 2022
- Prime Minister: Liz Truss
- Preceded by: Sir James Duddridge
- Succeeded by: Stephen Double

Member of Parliament for Gravesham
- In office 5 May 2005 – 30 May 2024
- Preceded by: Chris Pond
- Succeeded by: Lauren Sullivan

Personal details
- Born: Adam James Harold Holloway; 29 July 1965 (age 61) Faversham, Kent, England
- Party: Reform UK (since 2025)
- Other political affiliations: Conservative (until 2025)
- Education: Cranleigh School
- Alma mater: Magdalene College, Cambridge (MA); Imperial College London (MBA)
- Website: adamholloway.co.uk

Military service
- Allegiance: United Kingdom
- Branch/service: British Army
- Years of service: 1987–1991
- Rank: Captain
- Unit: Grenadier Guards
- Battles/wars: Gulf War
- Awards: Gulf Medal

Adam James Harold Holloway (born 29 July 1965) is a British politician and military veteran who was the Member of Parliament (MP) for Gravesham from 2005 until 2024. He resigned from the Conservative Party in 2025 to join Reform UK.

A staunch supporter of pro-Brexit lobby group Leave Means Leave, Holloway was elected to the Parliamentary Home Affairs Select Committee and European Scrutiny Committee. Appointed as Assistant Government Whip in July 2022 by Prime Minister Boris Johnson, he was promoted Government Whip from September to October 2022.

A former British Army Captain, Holloway was commissioned into the Grenadier Guards (1987–92) and served on attachment to the SAS during the First Gulf War.

Producer of the World in Action award-winning programme No Fixed Abode (1991) after just three months' of experiencing homelessness on the streets of London, Holloway established himself in undercover journalism, becoming a television broadcaster with ITN/ITV and Sky News, before entering parliament at the 2005 general election by unseating Labour's Chris Pond.

== Early life and education ==
Scion of a West Country family, including collateral ancestor Admiral John Holloway, he was born in 1965 at Faversham in Kent to Roger Holloway and Anne Matthews née Alsop.

After attending Cranleigh School in Surrey, Holloway spent his gap year with the Afghan mujahideen during the Soviet–Afghan War. He then went up to Magdalene College, Cambridge, where he read social and political sciences, graduating BA (proceeding MA). As an undergraduate Holloway spent his summer holidays revisiting Afghanistan then witnessing the Nicaraguan Revolution before teaching at Soweto, South Africa.

Holloway later pursued further studies at Imperial College London, being awarded MBA.

== Military career ==
After Cambridge, Holloway entered RMA Sandhurst and in 1987 was commissioned into the Grenadier Guards. As a subaltern with the 20th Armoured Infantry he served with the British Army on the Rhine. Promoted Captain, he saw action in the Gulf War with UK Special Forces on attachment from 1st Battalion, Grenadier Guards at the Battle of Norfolk as part of the 1st (United Kingdom) Armoured Division.

== Career in journalism ==
Leaving the army in 1991, Holloway worked as an investigative journalist and TV reporter with ITN and ITV. He produced an award-winning documentary series for the ITV programme World in Action, called "No Fixed Abode" (1991). In this series he locked access to his bank account and "slept rough" on the streets of London, for three months, in order to shed light on the difficulties experienced by the homeless, particularly those suffering from mental illness. In 2018, as an MP, Holloway slept rough again in London, for seven days, to see whether homelessness conditions had changed during the previous three decades.

In the ITV series Disguises, Holloway received training from two clinical psychiatrists before posing as a schizrophrenic in various English cities. He also went undercover as a Bosnian Muslim fleeing ethnic cleansing in the Balkans and witnessed people-smuggling firsthand.

Holloway was ITN Balkans correspondent during the siege of Sarajevo. He then went undercover as lead investigator for ITV News at 10, successfully exposing a Filipino child prostitution ring by posing as a paedophile.

Noted for his undercover journalism in the Sangatte refugee camp at Calais posing as an economic migrant, Holloway was also a war reporter during the Iraq War alongside Marie Colvin of The Sunday Times.

== Parliamentary career ==
=== First term (2005–2010) ===
Holloway delivered his maiden speech in the House of Commons on 28 June 2005, praising his constituency's multicultural community and raising issues about local crime.

In a 2009 report written by Holloway, he described how some of the claims about Iraq having weapons of mass destruction, used to support the UK Government's case for the invasion in 2003, originated from an Iraqi taxi driver. Particularly the claim about their ability to be "ready to launch in 45 minutes," which was one of the "central planks" of the government's case. According to Holloway, the unreliability of some sources was not expressed by MI6 while preparing the case for war because of pressure from the Prime Minister's Office.

As an MP, Holloway took a close interest in the war in Afghanistan where he visited, at his own expense, about a dozen times. In 2009 he wrote a paper for the Centre for Policy Studies titled "In Blood Stepp'd in too Far" which outlined the policies that he thought should be implemented during the War in Afghanistan: establishing an "honest government," ensuring that "tribal structures are supported, and "maintaining low levels of allied troops."

In the wake of the Westminster parliamentary expenses scandal in 2009, he was ordered by Sir Thomas Legg, the head of a committee examining abuse of expenses by Members of Parliament, to repay £1,000 to the Exchequer which he had misguidedly claimed in 2007.

=== Second term (2010–2015) ===
Holloway was returned as MP for Gravesham at the general election of 6 May 2010 with 22,956 votes (48.5% of the vote) and an increased majority of 9,312.

In October 2010 he was appointed Parliamentary Private Secretary (PPS) to David Lidington, Minister of State for Europe and NATO in the Foreign and Commonwealth Office. In 2011, Holloway undertook a fact-finding mission to Libya during the overthrow of Colonel Muanmar Gaddafi. In October 2011, he resigned from the government when he was whipped to vote against a non-binding Backbench Motion offering the British people a referendum on Europe. When speaking about his decision he said: "I'm not now prepared to go back on my word to constituents and I'm really staggered that loyal people like me have actually been put in this position," considering that previously he had "never voted against the party line." For this decision he received 'Backbencher of the Year' in The Spectator Parliamentarian of the Year Awards of 2011 as an MP who "in a choice between career and principle, chose principle."

Holloway has also spent time in Iraq at the frontline with the Islamic State and, on his own, has visited Mosul. In October 2014 he was one of just six Conservative MPs to vote against air strikes targeting Daesh in Iraq. He argued the campaign hadn't "been thought through". He deliberately abstained from the Commons vote on international military intervention against ISIL in Syria in November 2015.

=== Third term (2015–2017) ===
Holloway was again returned to Parliament at the 2015 general election with a majority of 8,370.

In a September 2015 parliamentary speech Holloway described giving asylum to refugees from the Middle East as "bonkers", stating than many "asylum seekers" go on holiday in the countries they fled and used his barber as an example. His barber, a Kurdish refugee, subsequently said that he was holidaying in Great Yarmouth that week, not Iraq.

Holloway publicly supported UK withdrawal from the EU at the 2016 United Kingdom European Union membership referendum. He stated his reasoning for Brexit as control of immigration, preservation of national sovereignty and maintaining strong defence ties with the United States. Holloway's constituency of Gravesham had the highest turnout of Leave voters in the United Kingdom, with 65.4% of constituents voting to exit the EU.

He was criticised by political rivals in June 2017 after he was seen campaigning with Janice Atkinson, then an Independent MEP for South East England and former UKIP member, who had been suspended from her former party after a fraud enquiry into her expenses, and who had subsequently become vice-president of Marine Le Pen's Movement for a Europe of Nations and Freedom European Parliament grouping.

=== Fourth term (2017–2019) ===
Holloway was again re-elected at the 2017 general election with an increased majority of 9,347.

As Chairman of the All-Party Parliamentary Group on drones, Holloway provided an article to PoliticsHome and was interviewed about combat drones by BBC Radio 5 Live on 17 July 2018.

In April 2018, Holloway said in Parliament that sleeping rough is "a lot more comfortable" than military exercises and that the majority of rough sleepers were "foreign nationals", in a debate on tackling street homelessness. In response to criticism from opposition politicians, Holloway defended his position during the debate by pointing to his personal experience of being in the Army and having spent several months sleeping on the streets as part of the ITV documentary No Fixed Abode (1991).

Holloway submitted a letter of no confidence in Prime Minister Theresa May over her Chequers plan for Brexit in November 2018. He justified his letter of no confidence by asserting "you cannot have someone leading a mission who does not believe in the mission". He was one of the 28 so-called 'Brexit Spartans' who voted against May's "deal" when it was presented to Parliament for a third time in March 2019.

=== Fifth term (2019–2024) ===
At the 2019 general election Holloway was re-elected with a majority 15,581, almost doubling his majority.

In 2020, Holloway was appointed Parliamentary Private Secretary to Secretary of State for Housing, Communities and Local Government Robert Jenrick. During the COVID-19 pandemic, Holloway set up 'Gravesham Community Support' to encourage people to become 'Super Neighbours', in order to pool resources, and to support and help their neighbours.

In July 2021, Holloway was one of five Conservative MPs found by the Commons Select Committee on Standards to have breached the code of conduct by writing to Lord Chief Justice Burnett attempting to influence a judge not to release character statements they had written for former Conservative MP Charlie Elphicke, who was previously found guilty on three counts of sexual assault and sentenced to two years in prison. On 22 July 2021, Holloway made a personal statement in the Commons to apologise.

In February 2022, Holloway visited Ukraine immediately following the Russian invasion of the country. His trip was criticised by Downing Street who had advised against travel to the country; Holloway stated in reply that visiting Ukraine helped improve his ability to represent the electorate and understand the conflict better. In March 2022, Holloway campaigned against the Lower Thames Crossing. He pointed out increased congestion in his constituency and argued against the economic case of the project, calling it a "white elephant". In April 2022, it was revealed that Holloway provided a character statement which was used as part of the defence case in the trial of former Conservative MP Imran Ahmad Khan, who was found guilty of sexually assaulting a 15-year-old boy.

Holloway publicly backed Boris Johnson during Partygate and the subsequent government crisis. He criticised the BBC for blowing the issue "out of proportion" and making Boris Johnson look like "some sort of Hannibal Lecter". Holloway served as an Assistant Government Whip from July to September 2022 and Government Whip from September to October 2022 under Boris Johnson and Liz Truss.

In June 2023, he was one of six Conservative MPs to vote against censuring Boris Johnson following the Commons Privileges Committee investigation.

After representing Gravesham in the House of Commons for 5 consecutive parliamentary terms, Holloway lost his seat at the 2024 general election being defeated by Labour's Lauren Sullivan.

=== Parliamentary and Government appointments ===
During his 18 years in Parliament, Holloway served on various All-Party Parliamentary Groups and Select Committees, last sitting on the Home Affairs Select Committee and the European Scrutiny Committee. He has previously served on the Defence Select Committee, Public Administration Committee, Foreign Affairs Select Committee and Science and Technology Select Committee.

Holloway was a member of All-Party Parliamentary Groups (APPGs) for Bahrain, Belize, Defence and Security Issues, Fit and Healthy Childhood, Foreign Affairs, Kazakhstan, Kurdistan in Turkey and Syria, Kyrgyzstan, London's Planning and Built Environment, Mongolia, Ukraine and Yoga in Society.

Holloway served as an Assistant Government Whip from July to September 2022 in the Second Johnson ministry, and then in the Truss ministry from September to October 2022 as Government Whip.

== Post-parliament and private life ==
Holloway was unseated at the 2024 Labour landslide, despite having been an increasingly popular constituency MP; he had increased his vote at each of the last three UK general elections.

Lauren Sullivan won Gravesham by a majority of 2,712 votes over Holloway, whose vote share slumped (as did the Conservative Party vote nationally) with Reform UK coming third with 8,910 votes, sufficient to deny Holloway being returned to Parliament. Reform UK's parliamentary candidate, Matthew Fraser Moat, was subsequently elected a Kent County Councillor in 2025. A lifelong Conservative, after much deliberation Holloway concluded in 2025 that his and the present Conservative Party's policy outlook had diverged so much as to resign his party membership and join Reform UK.

Holloway lived in Meopham and is a member of the Beefsteak and Pratt's Clubs. However, he later moved to Île du Coin in the Chagos Islands, part of the British Indian Ocean Territory (BIOT), to help rebuild a Chagossian community following the expulsion of the Chagossians from 1968 to 1973 to make way for the Naval Support Facility Diego Garcia, an American and British military base on Diego Garcia. His involvement stems from his opposition to Prime Minister Sir Keir Starmer's deal to cede the islands to Mauritius and his opposition to losing control of the base on Diego Garcia.

Parliament of the United Kingdom
| Preceded by Chris Pond | Member of Parliament for Gravesham; 2005–2024 | Succeeded by Lauren Sullivan |
