= Lauren Sullivan =

British politician

Lauren Sullivan MP
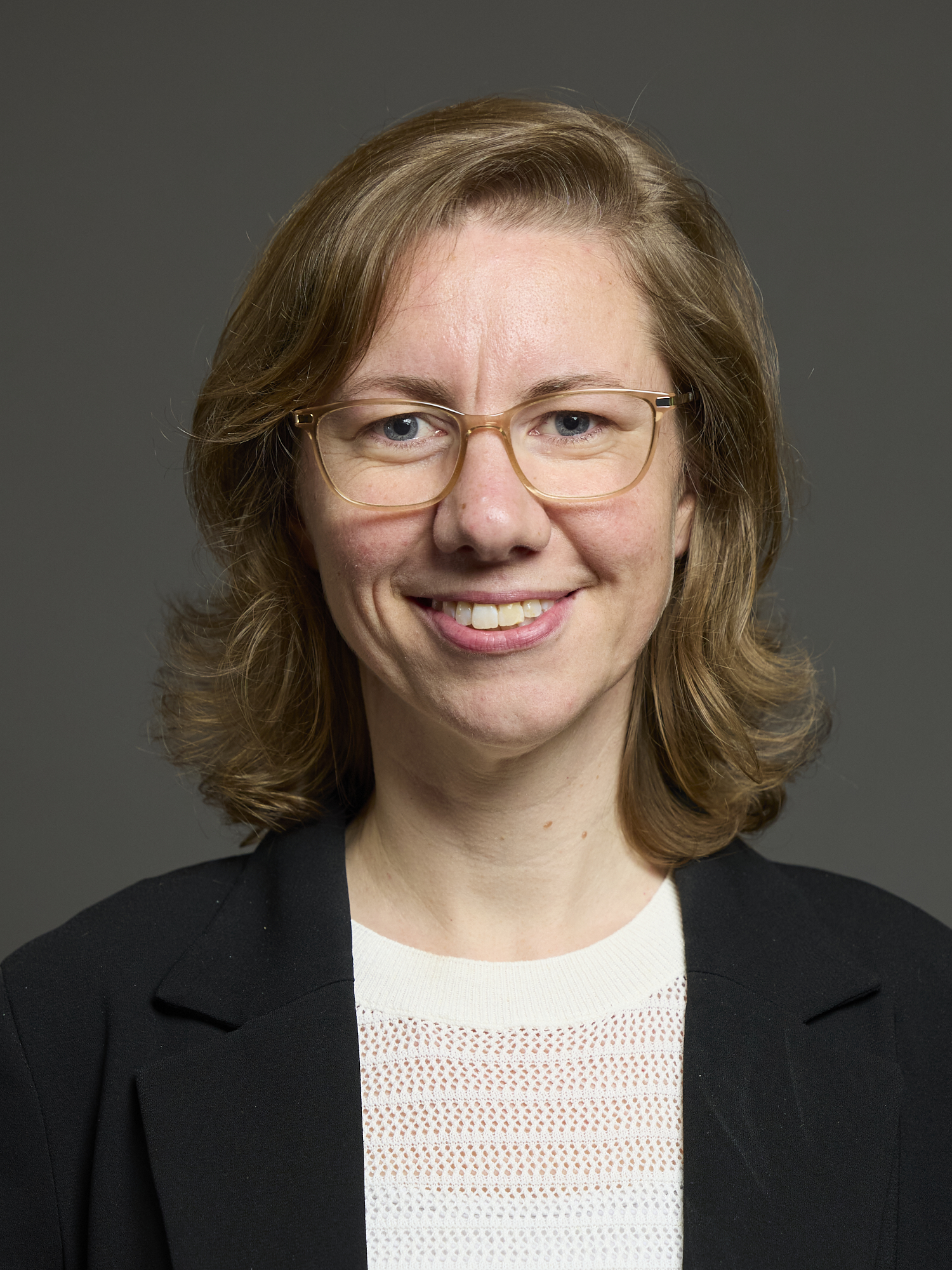
- Official portrait, 2024

Member of Parliament for Gravesham
- Incumbent
- Assumed office 4 July 2024
- Preceded by: Adam Holloway
- Majority: 2,712 (6.3%)

Personal details
- Party: Labour
- Profession: Politician

Lauren Sullivan is a British Labour Party politician serving as the Member of Parliament for Gravesham since the 2024 general election. Before being elected as a Member of Parliament, she was a scientist and a chemistry teacher.

== Early career ==
Sullivan researched neglected tropical diseases under Regius Professor Michael Ferguson at the University of Dundee, specialising in African sleeping sickness. She graduated from the University of Dundee with a Doctor of Philosophy (PhD) degree in 2012 with a doctoral thesis titled "Discovery and development of diagnostic biomarkers for human African trypanosomiasis". She then worked on malaria under Jean Langhorne at the Francis Crick Institute in London, having held a Daphne Jackson fellowship. She is also qualified as a secondary school science teacher.

She has served as Borough Councillor at Gravesham Borough Council and Leader of the Opposition at Kent County Council.

In her youth, Sullivan was elected as a Member of the UK Youth Parliament.

== Political career ==
In the 2024 general election, Sullivan was elected Member of Parliament (MP) for Gravesham with 16,623 votes (38.5%) and a majority of 2,712 over the second place Conservative candidate and incumbent, Adam Holloway.

Sullivan was a Councillor on Gravesham Borough Council from 2015 until 2025. She had been a Cabinet Member since 2019 and resigned as a Cabinet Member following her election to Parliament.

On 24 July 2024, Sullivan made her maiden speech in the House of Commons during a debate on education and opportunity.

On 20 May 2026, she was appointed parliamentary private secretary to the Department for Science, Innovation and Technology.
