= Gravesham =

Coordinates: 51.409°N 0.399°E

Gravesham Borough of Gravesham
- Borough and non-metropolitan district
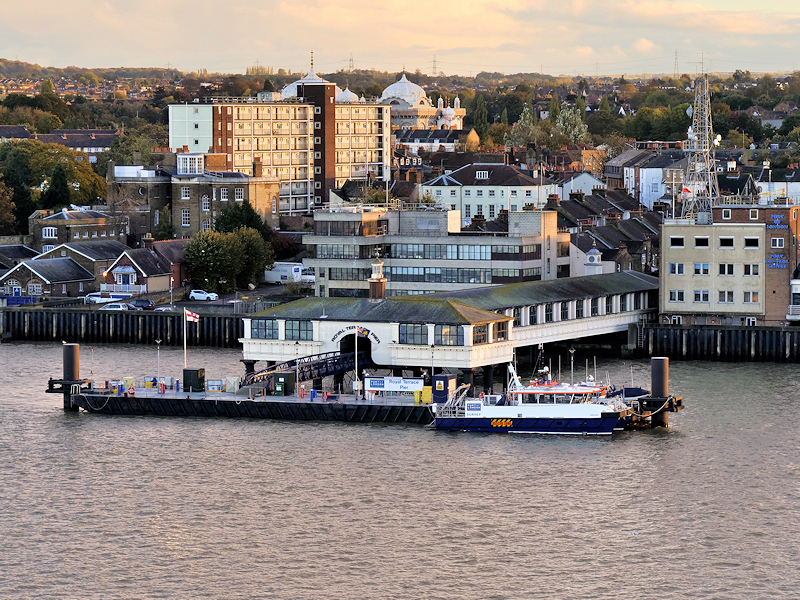
- Gravesend Royal Terrace Pier and town skyline

- Gravesham located within Kent
- Sovereign state: United Kingdom
- Constituent country: England
- Non-metropolitan county: Kent
- Status: Borough
- Admin HQ: Gravesend
- Incorporated: 1 April 1974

Government
  - Type: Non-metropolitan District Council
  - Body: Gravesham Borough Council
  - Leadership: Member of Parliament
  - MP: Lauren Sullivan

Area
  - Total: 38.23 sq mi (99.02 km^{2})
  - Rank: 198th (of 296)

Population (2024)
  - Total: 110,671
  - Rank: 225th (of 296)
  - Density: 2,895/sq mi (1,118/km^{2})

Ethnicity (2021)
  - Ethnic groups: List: 76.6% White; 11.2% Asian; 6.5% Black; 3% other; 2.6% Mixed

Religion (2021)
  - Religion: List: 49.2% Christianity; 32.1% no religion; 8% Sikhism; 5.2% not stated; 3.1% Islam; 1.4% Hinduism; 0.6% other; 0.3% Buddhism; 0.1% Judaism
- Time zone: UTC0 (GMT)
  - Summer (DST): UTC+1 (BST)
- ONS code: 29UG (ONS); E07000109 (GSS)
- OS grid reference: TQ647740
- Website: www.gravesham.gov.uk

Gravesham (/ˈɡreɪvʃəm/ GRAYV-shəm) is a local government district with borough status in north-west Kent, England. The council is based in its largest town of Gravesend. The borough is indirectly named after Gravesend, using the form of the town's name as it appeared in the Domesday Book of 1086. The district also contains Northfleet and a number of villages and surrounding rural areas.

Parts of the borough lie within the Kent Downs, a designated Area of Outstanding Natural Beauty. The neighbouring districts are Dartford, Sevenoaks, Tonbridge and Malling, and Medway, plus Thurrock on the opposite side of the River Thames.

Gravesham is twinned with Cambrai in Hauts-de-France, France and Neumünster in Schleswig-Holstein, Germany. The Gravesham parliamentary constituency covers the same area as the borough.

The entire borough is due to be abolished in April 2028 through major changes to local government in much of England. Gravesham will merge with the two adjacent councils of Dartford and Medway to form a new North Kent unitary authority, which will provide all services currently provided by Gravesham and Kent County Council (which will also be abolished). Shadow elections will be held in April 2027.

== History ==
The first borough in the area of modern Gravesham was "Gravesend and Milton", an ancient borough which had been incorporated in 1568 by Elizabeth I. The borough had been reformed in 1836 to become a municipal borough, at which point the name was changed to just "Gravesend".

The modern district was created on 1 April 1974 under the Local Government Act 1972, covering the whole area of two former districts and parts of a third, which were all abolished at the same time:

- Gravesend Municipal Borough
- Northfleet Urban District Council
- Strood Rural District (parishes of Cobham, Higham, Luddesdown, Meopham and Shorne only, rest went to Medway)

The new district was named Gravesham, using the form of Gravesend's name which had appeared in the Domesday Book. The choice of name was not without criticism; Robert Heath Hiscock, chairman of the Gravesend Historical Society, in the foreword to his book, 'A History of Gravesend' (Phillimore, 1976) wrote:

"The name Gravesham appears only in the Domesday Book, 1086, and was probably the error of a Norman scribe. It was 'Gravesend' in the Domesday Monarchorum c.1100, and 'Gravesende' in the Textus Roffensis c. 1100. It is strange that this "clerical error" should now have been adopted as the name of the new Council".

The district was granted borough status from its creation, allowing the chair of the council to take the title of mayor.

Under current local government reorganisation plans, all district councils in Kent, as well as the county council, will be abolished in 2028, with the district becoming part of a new North Kent unitary authority.

== Governance ==
Gravesham Borough Council

Leadership
- Mayor: Alison Williams, Labour since 12 May 2026
- Leader: John Burden, Labour since 16 May 2019
- Chief Executive: Stuart Bobby since 1 April 2020

Structure
- Seats: 39 councillors
- Political groups: Administration (22) Labour (22) Opposition (17) Conservative (12) Reform UK (5)

Elections
- Voting system: First past the post
- Last election: 4 May 2023

Meeting place
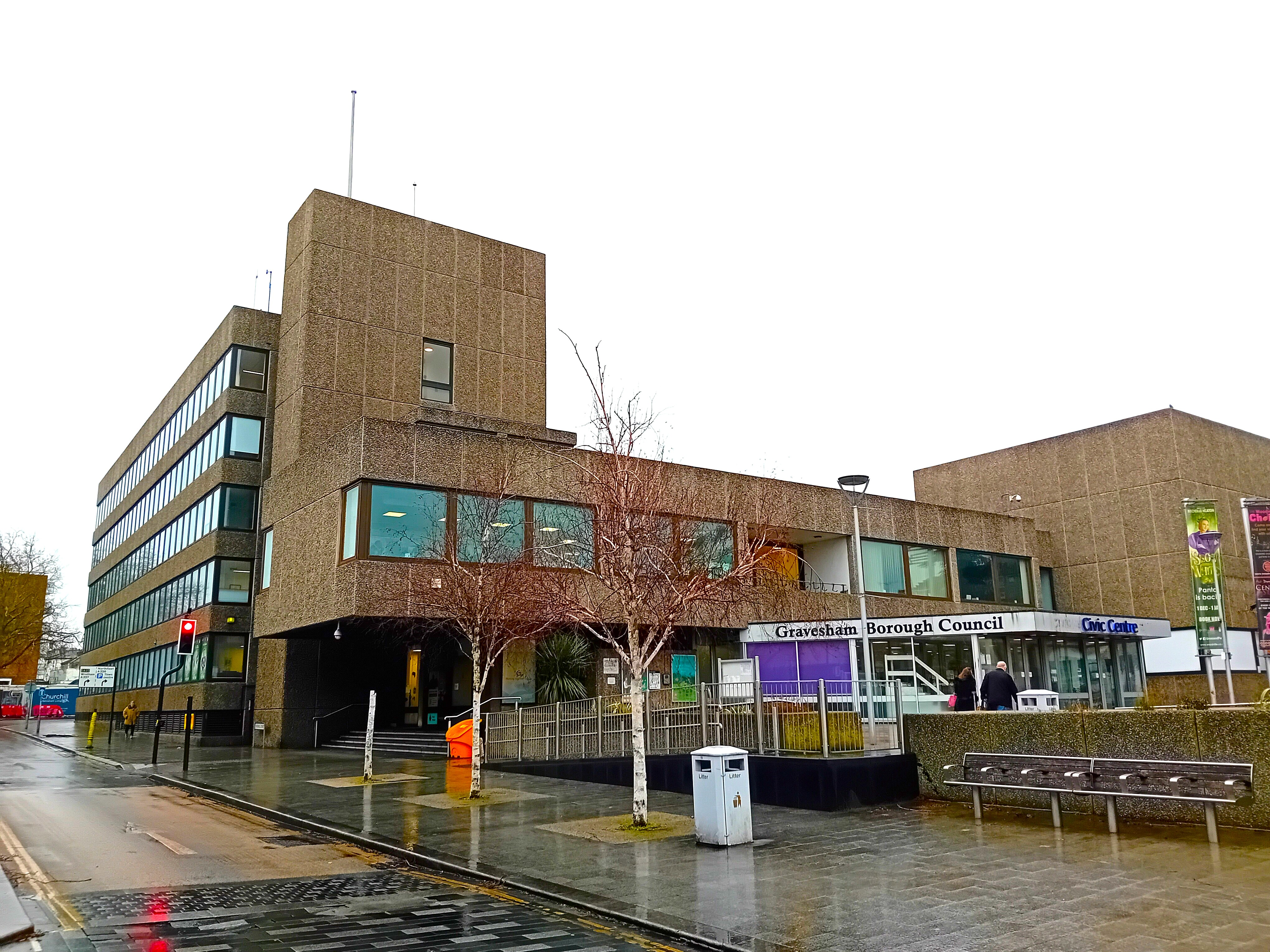
- Gravesham Civic Centre, Windmill Street, Gravesend, DA12 1AU

Website
- www.gravesham.gov.uk

Gravesham Borough Council provides district-level services. County-level services are provided by Kent County Council. The more rural parts of the borough are also covered by civil parishes, which form a third tier of local government.

=== Political control ===
The council has been under Labour majority control since the 2023 election.

The first election to the council was held in 1973, initially operating as a shadow authority alongside the outgoing authorities before coming into its powers on 1 April 1974. Political control of the council since 1974 has been as follows:

Party in control	Years
Labour	1974–1976
Conservative	1976–1987
No overall control	1987–1993
Labour	1993–2007
Conservative	2007–2011
Labour	2011–2015
Conservative	2015–2018
No overall control	2018–2019
Labour	2019–2021
No overall control	2021–2023
Labour	2023–present

=== Leadership ===
The role of mayor is largely ceremonial in Gravesham. Political leadership is instead provided by the leader of the council. The leaders since 2003 have been:

Councillor	Party	From	To
Rosemary Leadley	Labour		2003
John Burden	Labour	9 Dec 2003	May 2007
David Turner	Conservative	15 May 2007	26 Jun 2007
Mike Snelling	Conservative	26 Jun 2007	May 2011
John Burden	Labour	17 May 2011	May 2015
John Cubitt	Conservative	19 May 2015	Mar 2017
David Turner	Conservative	18 Apr 2017	Aug 2018
David Turner	Independent	Aug 2018	May 2019
John Burden	Labour	16 May 2019	

=== Composition ===
Following the 2023 election, and subsequent changes of allegiance up to July 2026, the composition of the council was:

Party	Councillors
Labour	22
Conservative	12
Reform	5
Total	39

=== Elections ===
Since the last boundary changes in 2023, the council has comprised 39 councillors, representing 17 wards, with each ward electing one, two or three councillors. Elections are held every four years.

The wards are:

- Chalk
- Coldharbour and Perry Street
- Denton
- Higham and Shorne
- Istead Rise, Cobham and Luddesdown
- Meopham North
- Meopham South and Vigo
- Northfleet and Springhead
- Painters Ash
- Pelham
- Riverview Park
- Rosherville
- Singlewell
- Town
- Westcourt
- Whitehill and Windmill Hill
- Woodlands

=== Premises ===
The council is based at Gravesham Civic Centre on Windmill Street in Gravesend, which had been built in 1966 for the old Gravesend Borough Council. The building was formally opened on 15 November 1968 by Katharine, Duchess of Kent.

== Housing and architecture ==
Housing varies from mid rise to low rise, particularly in the villages. The district has 12 buildings listed in the highest category of the national grading system, Grade I, three of which are private residences:

- Gadshill Place in Higham
- Luddesdown Court in Luddesdown
- Nurstead Court in Meopham

Cobham Hall, also in the highest architectural category, is a stately home which was formerly the seat of the Earls of Darnley: since 1965 it has been a private girls' school. Cobham Park is Grade II*-listed which is listed separately in the gardens and parklands category of classification approved by the Department of Culture, Media and Sport; and includes the remains of a Roman villa.

The other Grade I-listed buildings in the borough comprise its ancient parish churches.

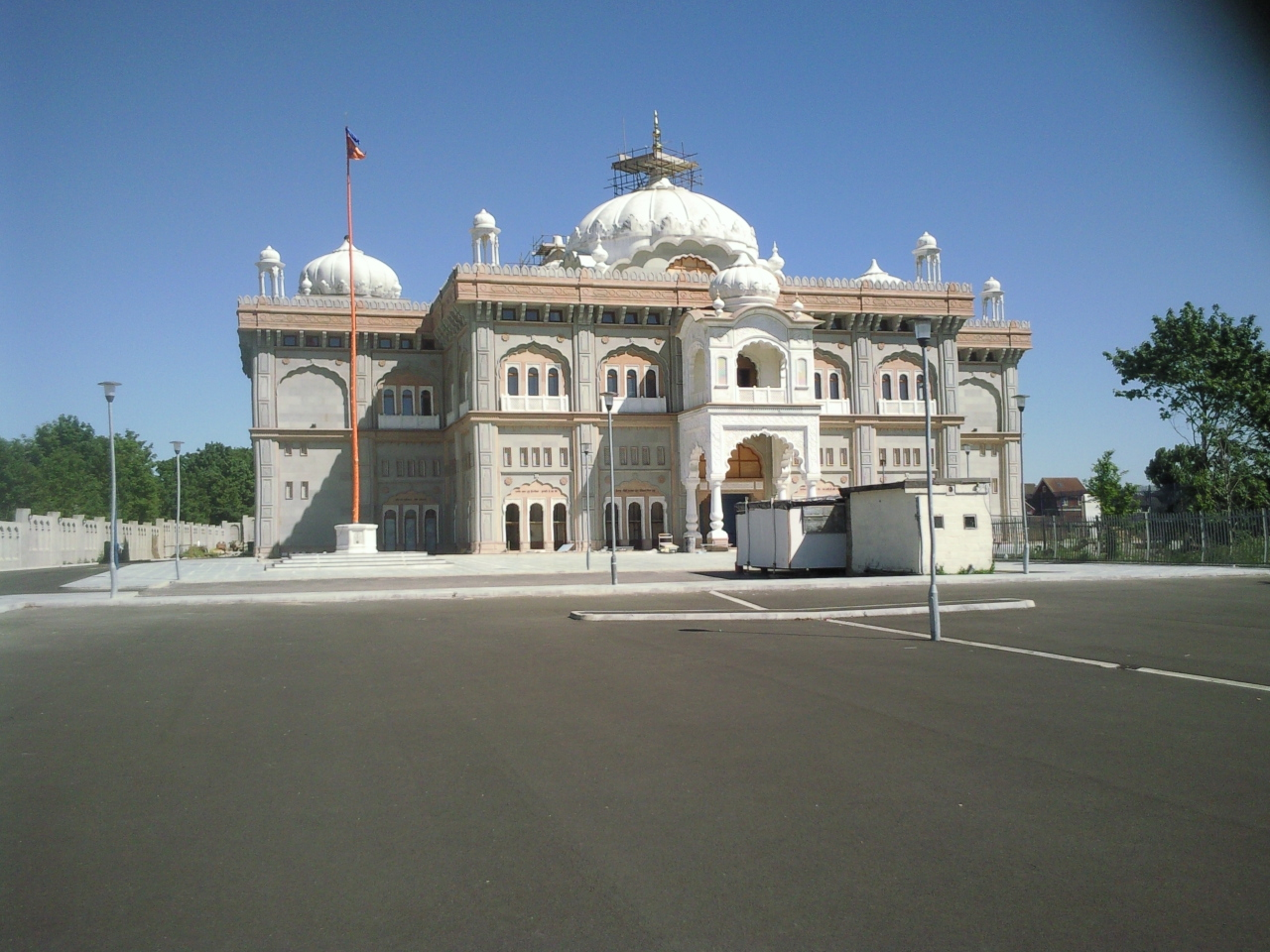
Guru Nanak Darbar Gurdwara, Gravesend

Gravesham is home to the largest Sikh Gurdwara in Europe, Guru Nanak Darbar Gurdwara.

== Parishes ==
The borough includes six civil parishes, covering the more rural eastern and southern parts. The more urban north-west of the borough, roughly corresponding to the combined area of the former borough of Gravesend and urban district of Northfleet, is an unparished area. The parishes are:

- Cobham
- Higham
- Luddesdown
- Meopham
- Shorne
- Vigo
