= Graham Petrie (artist) =

British artist, poster designer, and author

Graham Petrie (1859–1940), was a British artist, poster designer, and author. He was well known for his landscape and travel posters for railway companies.

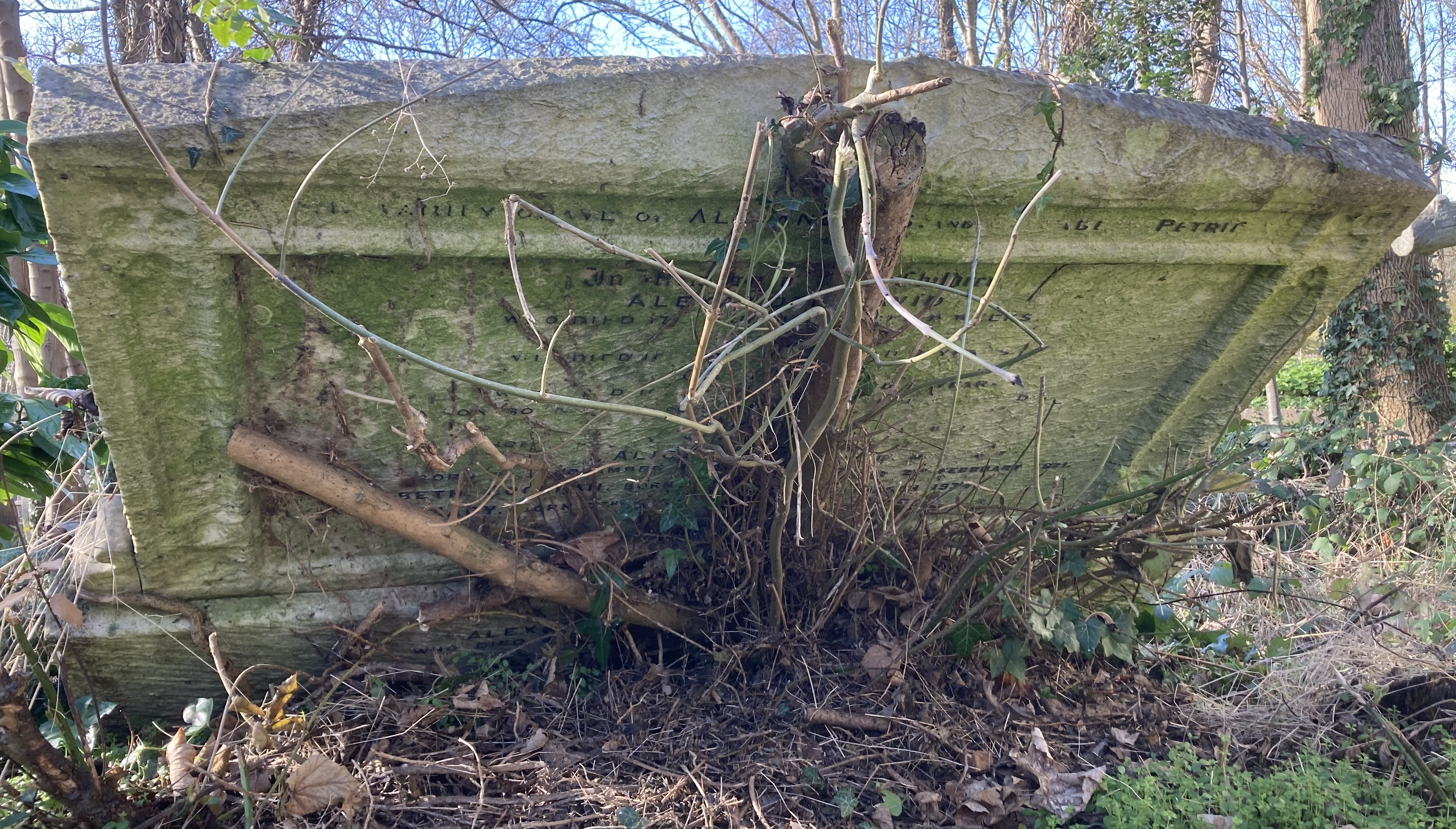
Petrie family vault in Highgate Cemetery

He was a member of the Royal Institute of Painters in Water Colours (elected 1903) and the Royal Institute of Oil Painters (elected 1920).

He was born in St Pancras, London, his parents were Alexander Sturrock Petrie (1815-1872), merchant, and Elizabeth Cochran. He originally trained as an architect under Richard Phené Spiers, educated at Mill Hill, then studied painting in London under Professor Fred Brown and in Paris. He was the brother of the watercolour landscape painter Elisabeth Cochran Petrie (1847-1921), who exhibited 1880–1902; another sister, Mary Petrie (1851-1934), was also a watercolour artist. Both sisters died at his house, 1 Mallord Street, Chelsea, where he had lived since about 1914.

He exhibited at the Grosvenor Gallery in 1889, with the Royal Society of British Artists in 1890, the Fine Art Society in 1897, the Royal Institute of Painters in Water Colours and with the British Society of Poster Designers in 1927. Also at the Dowdeswell Galleries, New Gallery, and the New English Art Club. He exhibited at the Royal Academy Summer Exhibition between 1893 and 1930.

In 1889 Petrie was present at the dinner held to congratulate Whistler on being made an Honorary Member of the Royal Academy of Munich, at the Criterion in Piccadilly. In 1928 he represented the Chelsea Arts Club on the Chelsea Society Council.

Tunis, Kairouan & Carthage

He died on 31 May 1940 at his house in Mallord Street by accidentally setting his bedclothes on fire from a cigarette. His body was cremated and the ashes were interred in the Petrie family vault (plot no.25214) on the eastern side of Highgate Cemetery.

== Publications ==
Tunis, Kairouan & Carthage, described and illustrated with forty-eight paintings, by Graham Petrie, R. I. London, W. Heinemann, 1908.
