= Shawfield Street =

Street in Chelsea, London

- Interactive map of Shawfield Street
- Length: 730 ft (220 m)
- Postal code: SW3
- Coordinates: 51.4878°N 0.1658°W
- Northwest end: A3217; King's Road
- Southeast end: Redesdale Street

Shawfield Street is a street in the Royal Borough of Kensington & Chelsea off King's Road in SW3. On the corner is Shawfield House, a 7-bedroom mansion currently owned by Charles Saatchi and formerly, of ex-wife Nigella Lawson, which was redeveloped by them from a former gas engineering works. There is also an Oxfam shop on Shawfield Street and a hairdresser's called Vanilla . The street was used in the 2013 film Saving Mr. Banks as No.29 was the historical home of writer P. L. Travers.

It is parallel to Radnor Walk and Flood Street.
