= Radnor Walk =

Street in Chelsea, London

Coordinates: 51.4878°N 0.1652°W

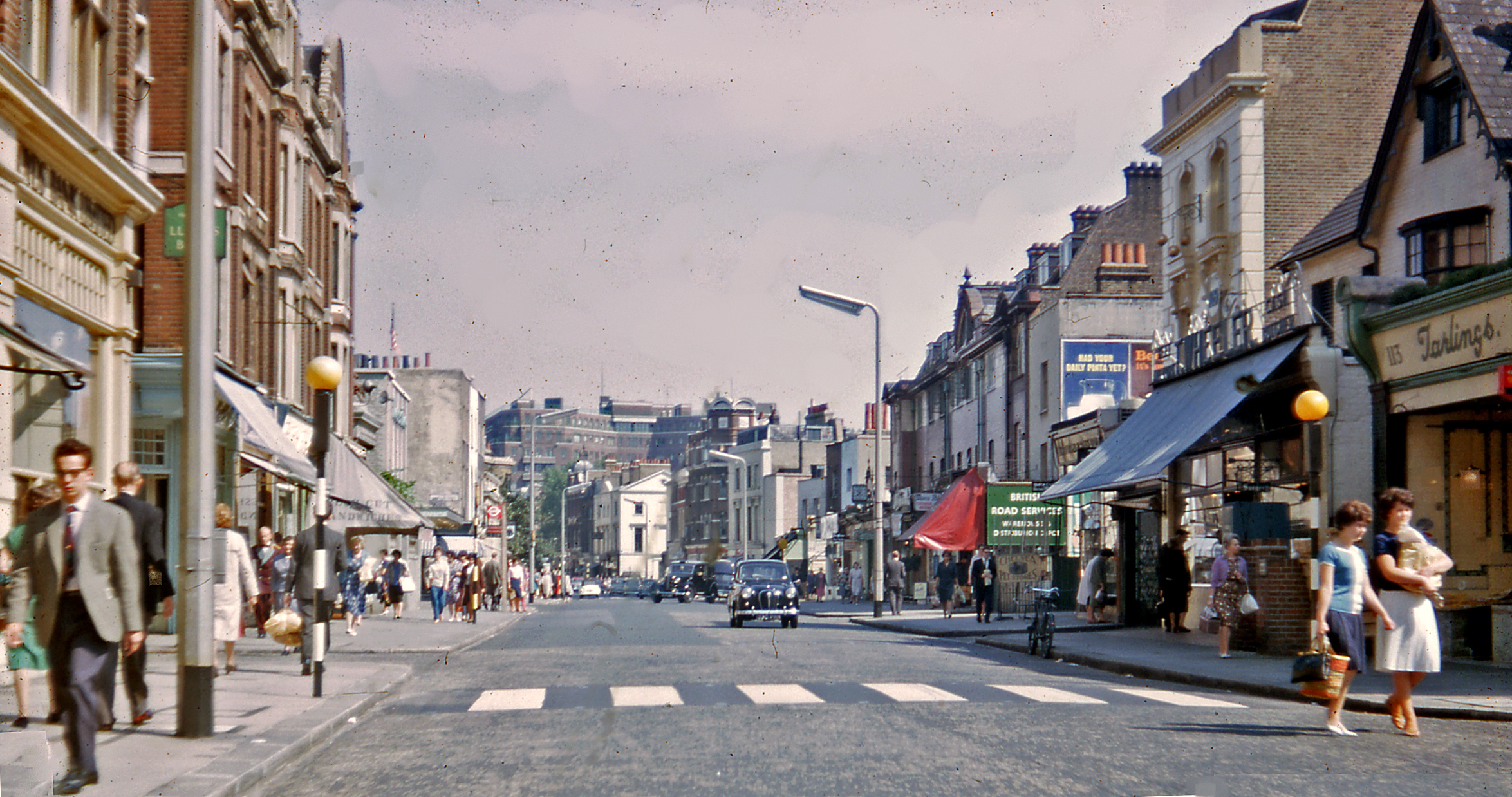
The Kings' Road in 1962

Radnor Walk is a residential street in the Royal Borough of Kensington & Chelsea off the King's Road in London. The houses are mid and late Victorian and the street is part of the Royal Hospital Conservation Area. It was originally called Radnor Street, and was named after John Robartes, 1st Earl of Radnor who died in Chelsea in 1685. It was renamed Radnor Walk in 1937.

It runs parallel to Shawfield Street and Smith Street.

== Buildings and residents ==
The street includes a Grade II listed former Welsh Congregational church.

The well known local restaurant Zianni is situated at number 45, while at the top of the street is the Founder's Hall of the notable Hill House School. Famous residents include John Betjeman.

Molly Parkin had a boutique 'The Shop' at 47 Radnor Walk which she sold in 1965 to photographer and film director Terence Donovan and designer Maurice Jeffery.

Radnor Studios, dating from mid to late 19th century, were artists' studios. Together with two late Georgian terrace houses, numbers 3 and 5, they were replaced in 1970 with a four-storey block designed by the architects Hayes Stafford.

Occupants of the Studios included:

- James Wedgwood; c. 1927–c. 1932
- William Leslie Bowles, Australian sculptor; 1920–1923
- Hibbert Charles Binney; c. 1894–1897
- Herbert Harry Cawood; c. 1920–c. 1926
- Cecil Hew Brown; c. 1923
- John Francis Kavanagh, Irish sculptor and artist; c. 1937–c. 1943
- Francis Derwent Wood, British sculptor; 1894
- Lady Henrietta Spencer-Churchill, English interior decorator; 1999
- Kiki Kogelnik, Austro-American artist; late 1966–early 1967
