= Mallord Street =

Street in London

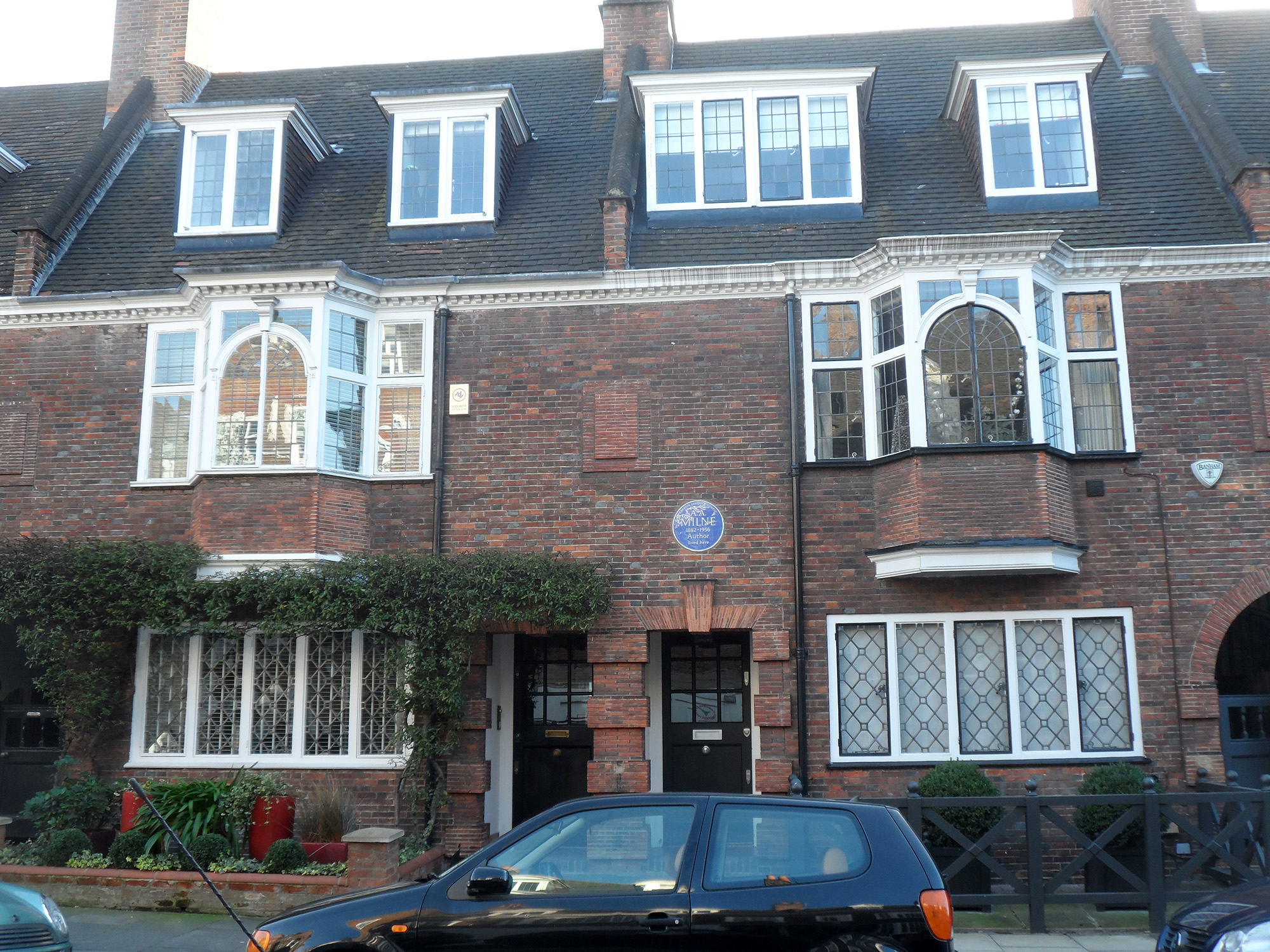
- 13 Mallord Street, Grade II listed, has a blue plaque commemorating the author A. A. Milne.

- Location within Royal Borough of Kensington and Chelsea
- Location: Chelsea, London, England, United Kingdom
- Postal code: SW3
- Nearest metro station: South Kensington tube station
- Coordinates: 51°29′09″N 0°10′28″W

Other
- Known for: Edwardian architecture, with several Grade II listed buildings and notable former residents

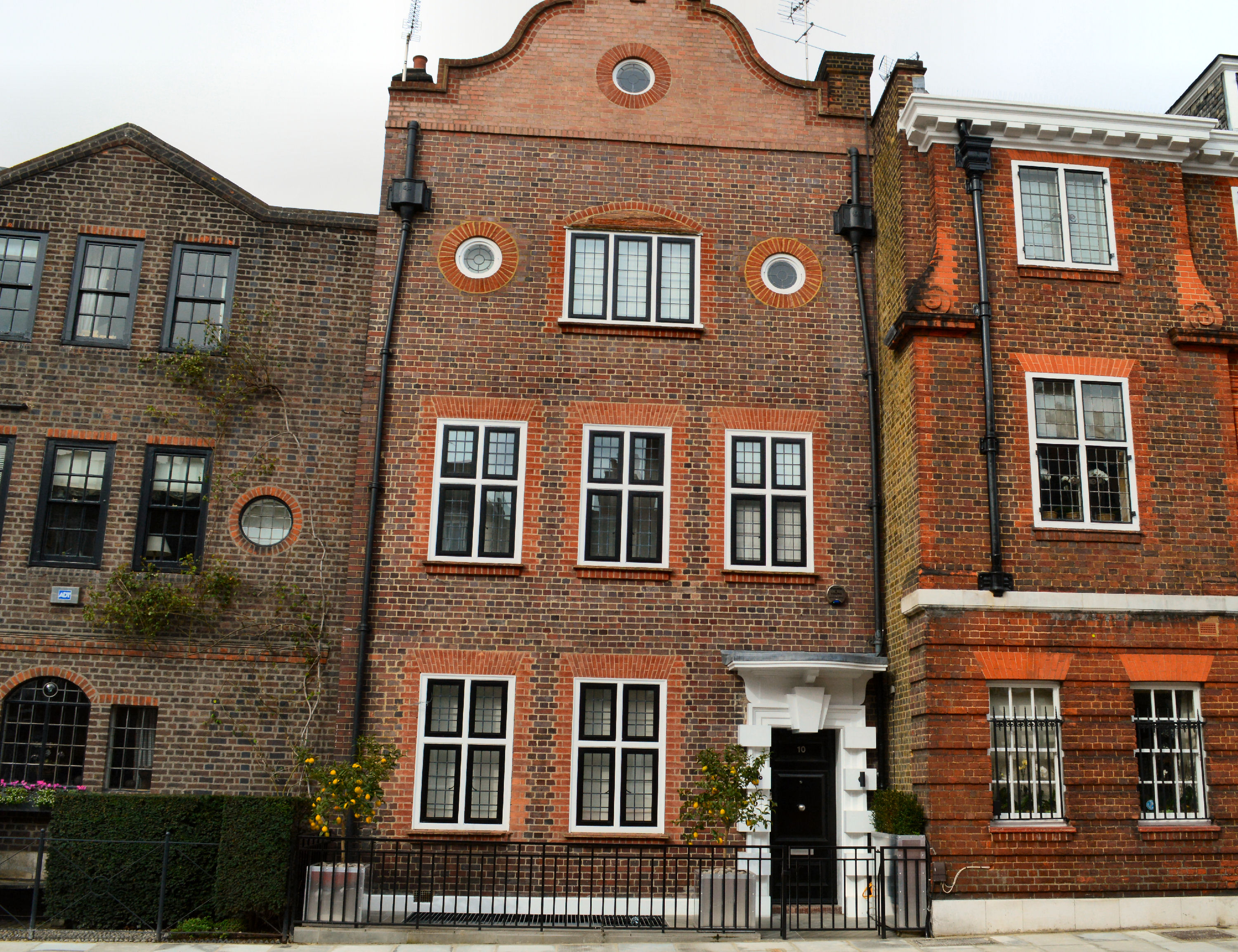
10 Mallord Street, where the sculptor and artist John Francis Kavanagh lived

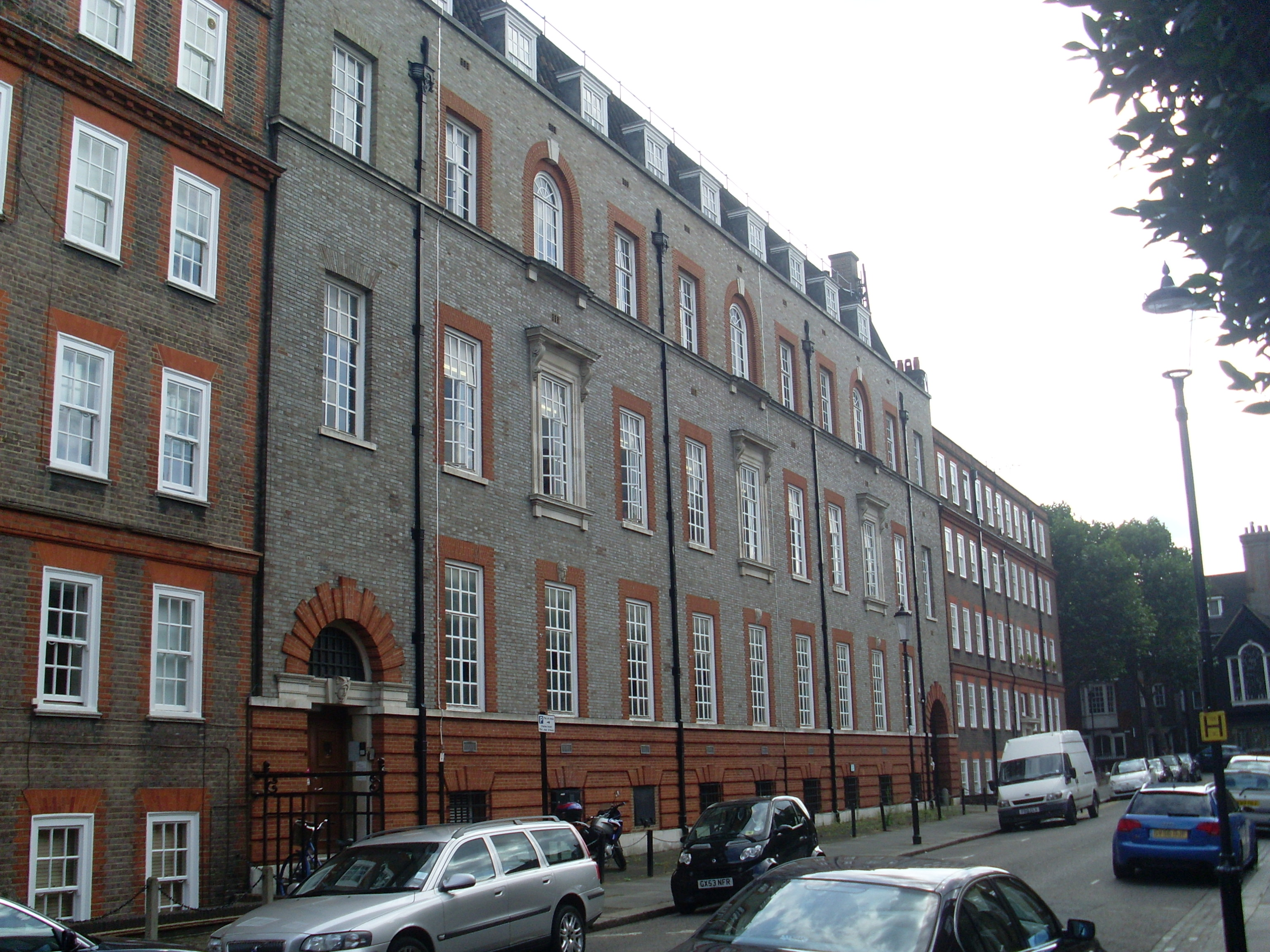
Chelsea's former telephone exchange is at 19 Mallord Street.

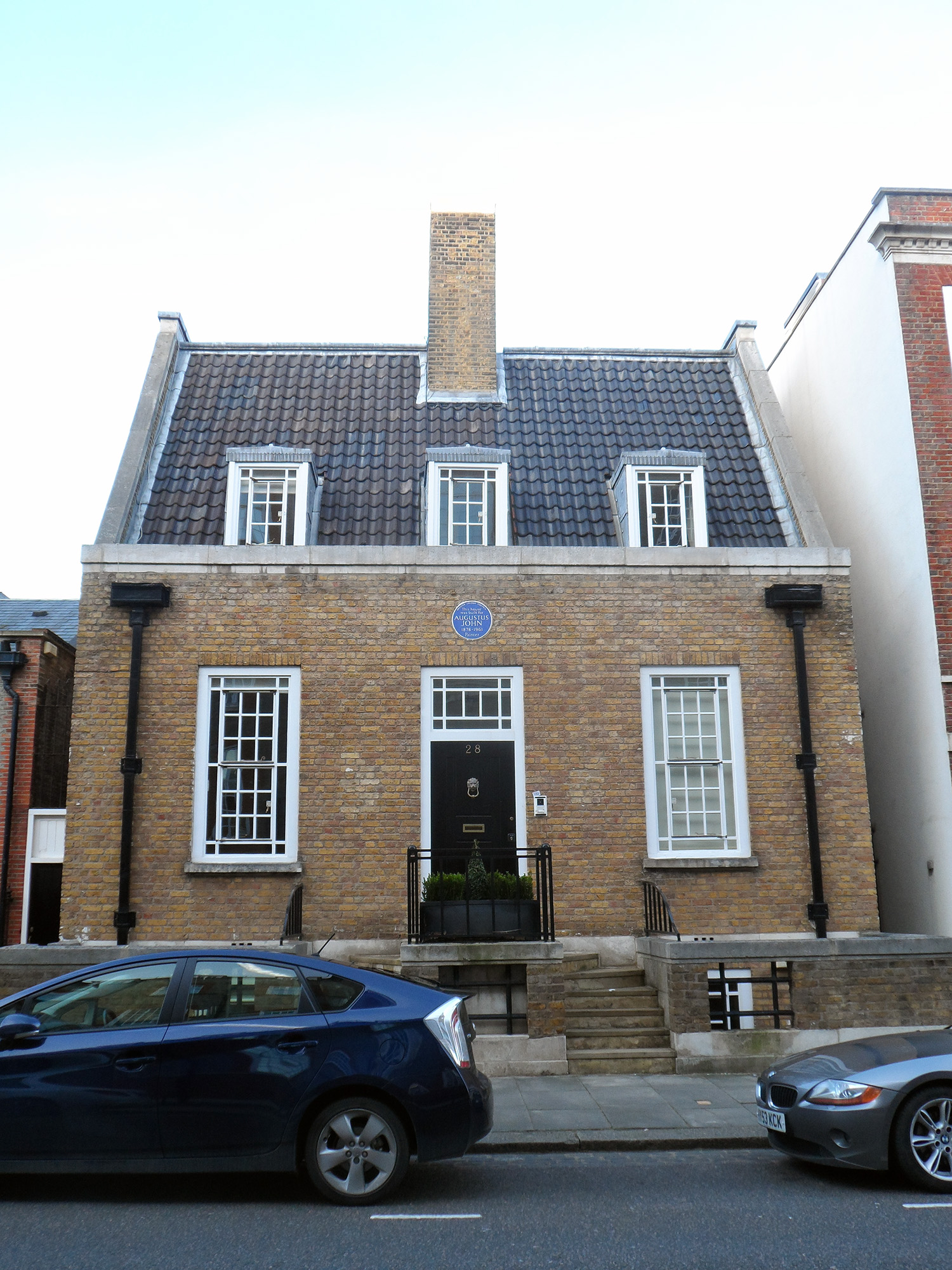
28 Mallord Street has a blue plaque commemorating the artist Augustus John.

Mallord Street is a street in London, England in the Royal Borough of Kensington and Chelsea. It was named after Joseph Mallord William Turner who had lived in Chelsea. There are no other streets named Mallord Street in Great Britain.

Mallord Street is parallel to the King's Road and runs from Old Church Street to The Vale. It was created in 1909 when The Vale was extended northwards, and Mallord Street and Mulberry Street were added to link it with Old Church Street. Renumbering took place in 1924.

Nine of the houses in the street are listed Grade II by Historic England and there have been several notable residents, including the author A. A. Milne and the artist Augustus John.

== Notable buildings and residents ==
=== Odd-numbered buildings ===
No. 1, designed by the architect Ralph Knott, was built in 1911 for watercolourist Cecil Arthur Hunt (1873–1965) who had abandoned a career as a barrister to become a full-time painter. Graham Petrie (1859–1940), a British artist, poster designer and author, lived at 1 Mallord Street from about 1914 up to his tragic death. The Hungarian-born, later British, pianist Louis Kentner (1905–1987), who excelled in the works of Chopin and Liszt, lived there from 1946 with his second wife, Griselda Gould, daughter of the pianist Evelyn Suart (Lady Harcourt).

At No. 7, the writer and biographer Enid Moberly Bell (1881–1967), who was the first headmistress at Lady Margaret School in Parsons Green and vice-chair of the Lyceum Club for female artists and writers, set up home with Anne Lupton (1888–1967), the founder and organiser of the London Housing Centre. Both women had studied at Newnham College at Cambridge University where Enid graduated with an M.A. in 1911. Anne was the sister of Olive Middleton, née Lupton, great-grandmother of Catherine, Princess of Wales. Both Olive and Anne were actively involved in women's issues.

Nos. 9, 11, 13 and 15, all Grade II-listed, are a terrace of four houses, c 1914, by the architect Frederick Ernest Williams (1866–1929).

No. 9 was the home of Sir Arthur James Irvine (1909–1978), a British barrister and Labour MP, from the late 1930s. In 1939 Irvine, then secretary to the Lord Chief Justice, lived in a flat at No. 17, Tryon House, a residential mansion block.

No. 13 (formerly No. 11) has a blue plaque. It was the home of author A. A. Milne (1882–1956) and his wife Daphne (1890–1971) from 1919 until about 1940. Their son Christopher Robin (1920–1996) was born here. As a child he was the basis of the character Christopher Robin in his father's Winnie-the-Pooh stories and in two books of poems, all written at this house.

No. 15 was the home of the actor Dennis Price (1915–1973) from 1948 until his divorce in 1950.

No. 19 is Chelsea's former telephone exchange, whose future use is under discussion.

At No. 21 (Vale Court) in 1963, Stephen Ward (1912–1963), the society osteopath who was one of the central figures in the Profumo affair, committed suicide in a friend's flat.

=== Even-numbered buildings ===
Nos. 2 and 4, known together as Mallord House, are listed Grade II by Historic England. They were designed by Ralph Knott. The English film and stage actor Garry Marsh was recorded living at "Mallord Cottage" in the 1920s and 1930s.

Nos. 6 and 8, also Grade II listed, were designed by W. D. Caröe in 1912–13 for Percy Morris of Elm Park Gardens, and were originally intended for Morris's coachman.

No. 10 was the home of the Irish sculptor and artist John Francis Kavanagh (1903–1984) from about 1936 to about 1946.

Sir William Thomas Furse (1865–1953), a Master-General of the Ordnance, lived at No. 18.

Anthony Crossley (1903–1939), a writer, publisher and Conservative politician, lived with his family at No. 26.

No. 28 is a house built in 1913–14 by the Russian architect Boris Anrep, from designs by Dutch architect Robert van 't Hoff, for the artist Augustus John (1878–1961) to use as a studio. In 1935 it was bought by the popular singer Gracie Fields (1887–1979). It is a Grade II listed building and has a blue plaque commemorating John.

No. 32 was built in about 1913 for the landscape artist Arthur Croft Mitchell (1872–1956), including a studio at the back, from designs by Charles Hall. He lived there until his death.
