= John Francis Kavanagh =

Irish sculptor and artist (1903–1984)

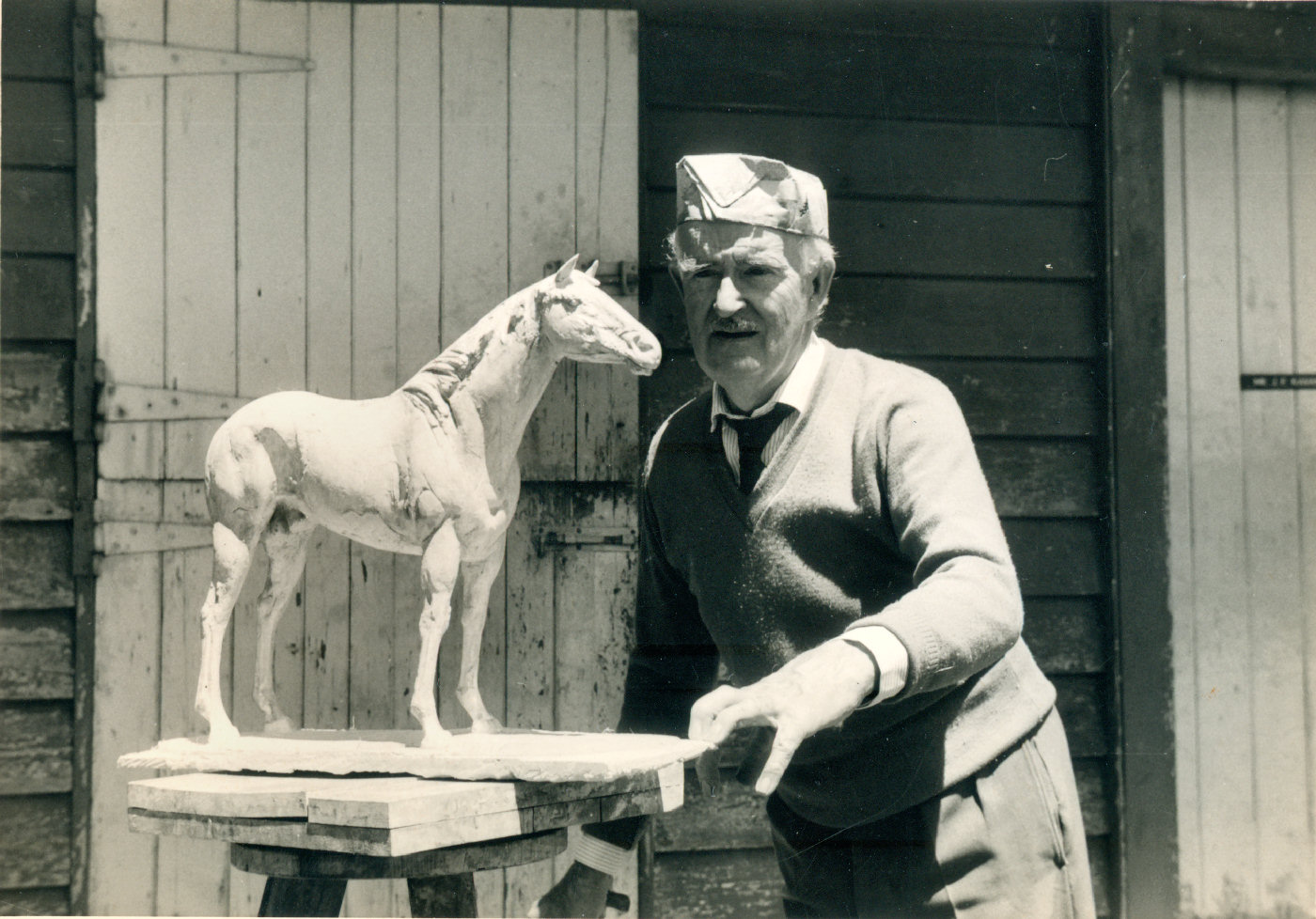
John Kavanagh with his sculpture of Battle-waggon, photographed in 1972

John Francis Kavanagh (24 September 1903 – 18 June 1984) was an Irish sculptor and artist. In 1930 he was awarded the British School at Rome Scholarship in Sculpture.

In 1933 he was appointed Head of Department of Sculpture and Modelling at the Leeds College of Art.

Kavanagh was an Associate member of the Royal British Society of Sculptors from 1935, and elected a Fellow in 1945. In 1951 he took up the post of Senior Lecturer in Sculpture at the Elam School of Fine Arts in Auckland, New Zealand.

== Early life and education ==
John Francis Kavanagh was born in Birr Barracks, Birr, County Offaly, the eldest son of John Michael Kavanagh, a soldier in the Leinster Regiment, and Maud O'Hare. At the age of 16 he had an accident when he fell in a quarry in which he suffered severe spinal injuries which left him needing a surgical boot and walking with the aid of a stick. During his three-year recovery he would make clay models and decided that he had a talent for sculpture. He studied at the Crawford School of Art, Cork (1919–1921) and then the Liverpool School of Art (1920–21). In 1925 he won a scholarship to the Royal College of Art, London, for sculpture, studying there (23 September 1925 to 7 March 1930) under Gilbert Ledward, Henry Moore, William Rothenstein, A. Ernest Cole, and Charles Sargeant Jagger; he obtained the Diploma in Sculpture (A.R.C.A.) in 1928. He was an assistant to Jagger for about six months in 1929; he modelled the elephants outside the New Residence in New Delhi, India, as part of Jagger's design. His relief of World War 1 soldiers, completed about this time, is in the Auckland War Memorial Museum and shows the influence of Jagger.

== Career ==
=== Rome ===
In 1929 he won a RCA travelling scholarship which took him to Paris, Berlin, Munich and Vienna. Then in 1930 with "Workers Lifting Steel" he won the Rome Scholarship in Sculpture (British Prix de Rome) to study for two years at the British School in Rome; he received a grant from the trustees of the Bird Fund of the Royal Academy to stay until 1933. "Workers Lifting Steel", a relief of labourers shifting a heavy girder, was described at the time 'as good as anything of the kind by a student that we have ever seen' It was posthumously cast in bronze by the Leicester Galleries in 1994. Another work from this period was the head of Colin St Clair Oakes, which exhibited in 1934.

He followed the tradition of classical sculpture and the human figure, as shown by some of the work at this period. His work "Classical Male Athletes" from this period was included in the 2016 exhibition "The Mythic Method: Classicism in British Art 1920-1950" at the Pallant House Gallery.

"The work which Mr. Kavanagh has produced during his three years in Italy is marked by originality, a fine sense of design and excellent technique, and no less than three examples of his studies were exhibited at the Royal Academy in 1933. There is no doubt that he has used his Scholarship well, and has undoubtedly benefited by his close and conscientious study, and the Faculty were unanimous in offering him their warm congratulations upon the results of his work."

Two of the works from this period that were exhibited at the Royal Academy in 1933 were Tanith and Wanda Tiburzzi, which also won the bronze medal at the Paris Salon in 1935. Wanda Tiburzzi was an Italian woman that he persuaded to model for him.

"Mr Kavanagh first saw his subject in Rome, when driving in the gardens of the Villa Borghese. After great difficulty, he traced the woman, and was able to arrange for the sculpture which has since attained such renown."

A review of the Royal Academy Exhibition by Kineton Parker in Apollo remarked that "In the Central Hall is a strange, somewhat uncouth knobbly figure of a woman, "Tanith", in bronze, life-size, by John F. Kavanagh, who is a Prix de Rome 1930 Scholar. It has originality, and is its author's most important work to date. He has, however, two others in the exhibition; a bust "Wanda Tiburzzi", and one of an old Italian. Both are full of character, and if we combine this feeling for character with the fresh feeling for form in "Tanith", there seems to be a considerable chance of the making of a fine sculptor of this definitely plastic artist."

Much of his work was left in storage in Rome and was destroyed during the war. There were difficulties importing his "statue of Venus" into Britain in 1936 for exhibition at the Royal Academy because statues were classed as 'tombstones' and therefore liable for duty.

=== Leeds ===
He was Head of the School of Sculpture and Modelling at Leeds College of Art from 1933 – 1939 and taught stone and marble carving in the School of Industrial Design and Crafts.

In 1936 he was commissioned for a memorial by Miss M C Vyvyan, a retiring headmistress at Roundhay Girls’ High School, Leeds; it was stolen from the school in the early 1990s. The bronze work "Cora Ann: The Spirit of Youth" shows a figure of a Spartan athlete; the model for it was exhibited at the Royal Academy.

Also in 1936 he won an international competition to design the Medal presented by the Royal Institute of British Architects to winners of the Rome Prize in Architecture. The medal shows the Arms of the Institute, lions rampant on either side of a column with the inscription ROYAL INSTITUTE OF BRITISH ARCHITECTS 1934 while the reverse has the inscription ROME SCHOLARSHIP IN ARCHITECTURE with a central space for the name.

He was elected as a member of the National Society of Painters, Sculptors, Engravers, Potters, in 1938. He exhibited with them in 1937 with bronzes "Cortino di Ampezzo", "Tanith", "Dr P.Duval", and "Etruria". In 1938 he exhibited "Lady Jane" and "J.W.Dulanty".

His highly stylized "Lady Jane" was exhibited at the Royal Hibernian Academy (1936) and toured America in 1944. A version is now in Auckland City Art Gallery. His sandstone "Crouching Figure" (c 1936), a nude female figure with her head wrapped, is now in the Aigantighe Art Gallery, Timaru. His sculpture Satyr and Nymph (1930) was exhibited at the Auckland Society of Arts.

He was commissioned in 1939 to carve the rood cross for All Souls', Leeds, the "Hook Memorial" Church, receiving £200. The carving of "Christ Triumphant on the Cross" was carved in lime wood and was the largest wooden figure made in England at that time since the Renaissance. It shows Christ on the Cross, wearing the alb and raising his arms free in blessing. Its design took into consideration the extreme foreshortening involved in hanging high in the nave.

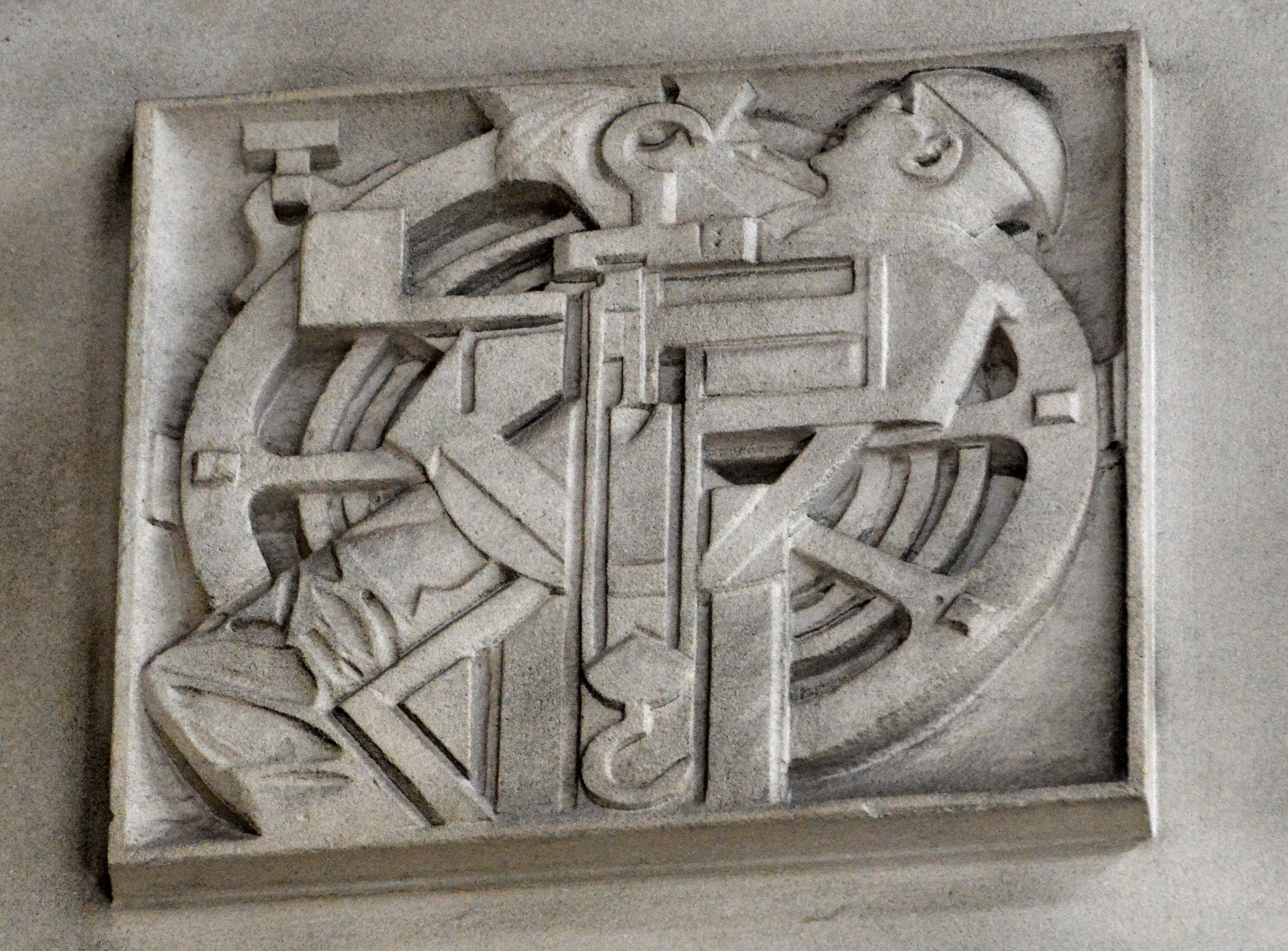
"Mechanic". Walthamstow Town Hall

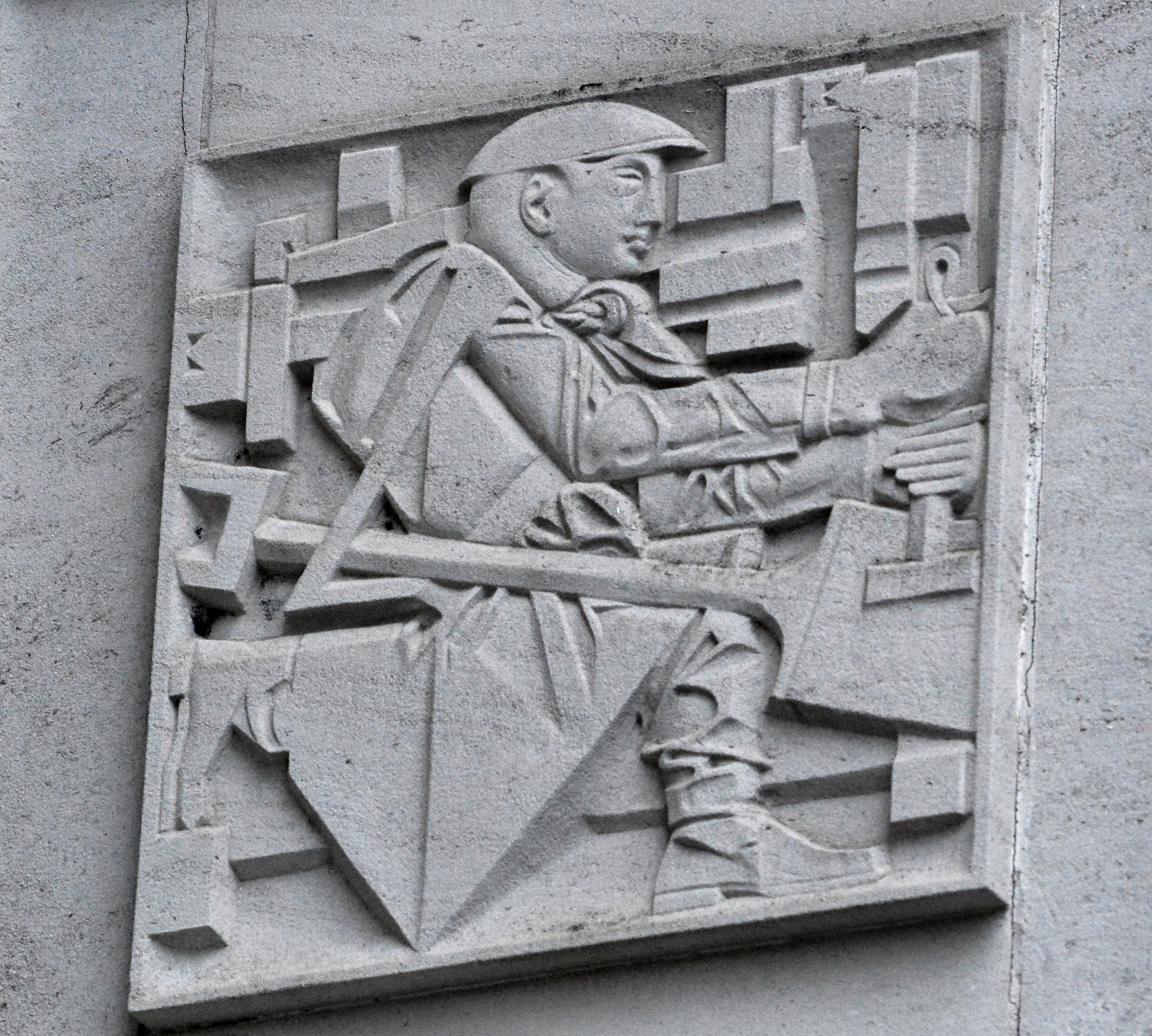
"Navvy". Walthamstow Town Hall

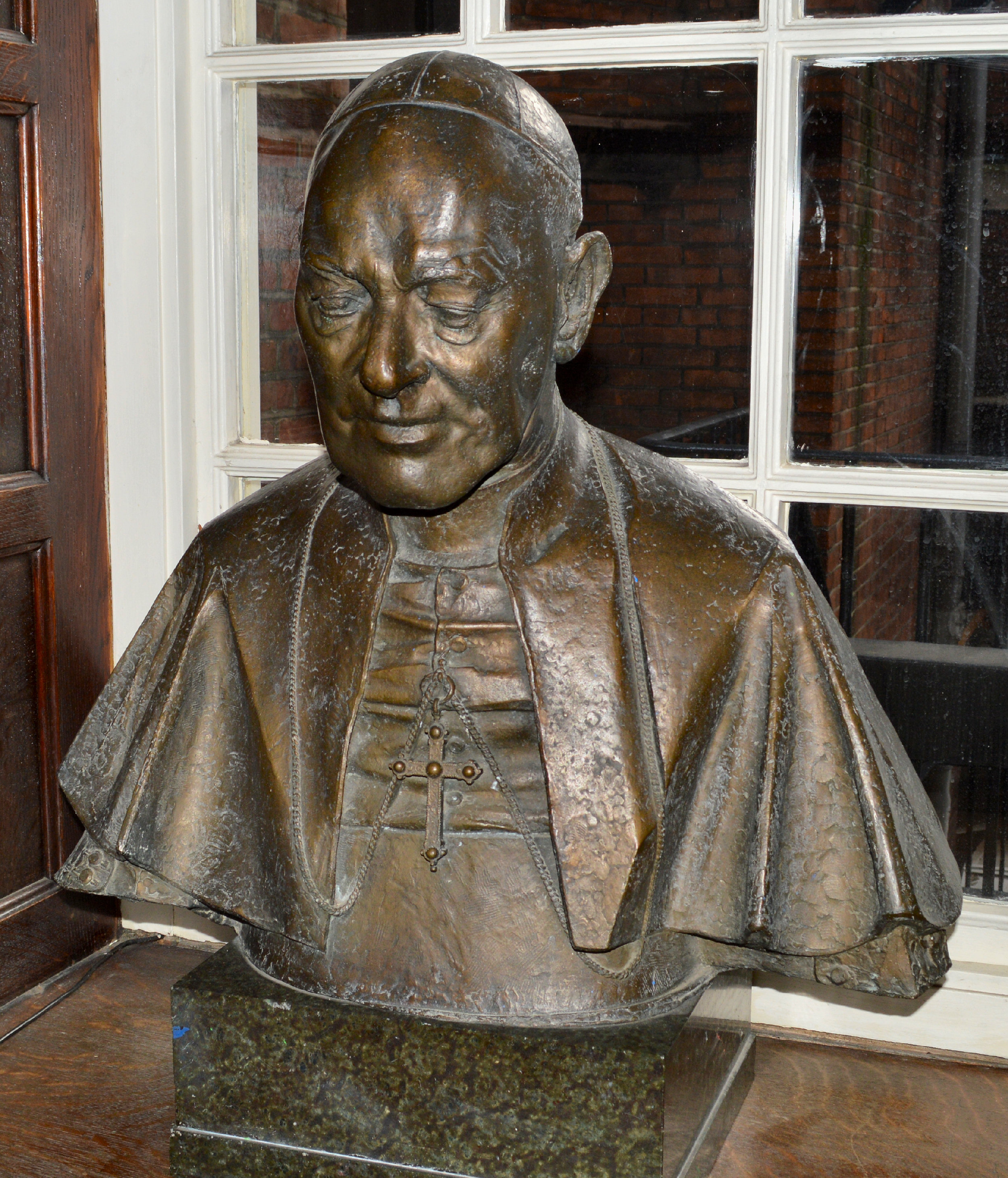
Bust of Cardinal Hinsley

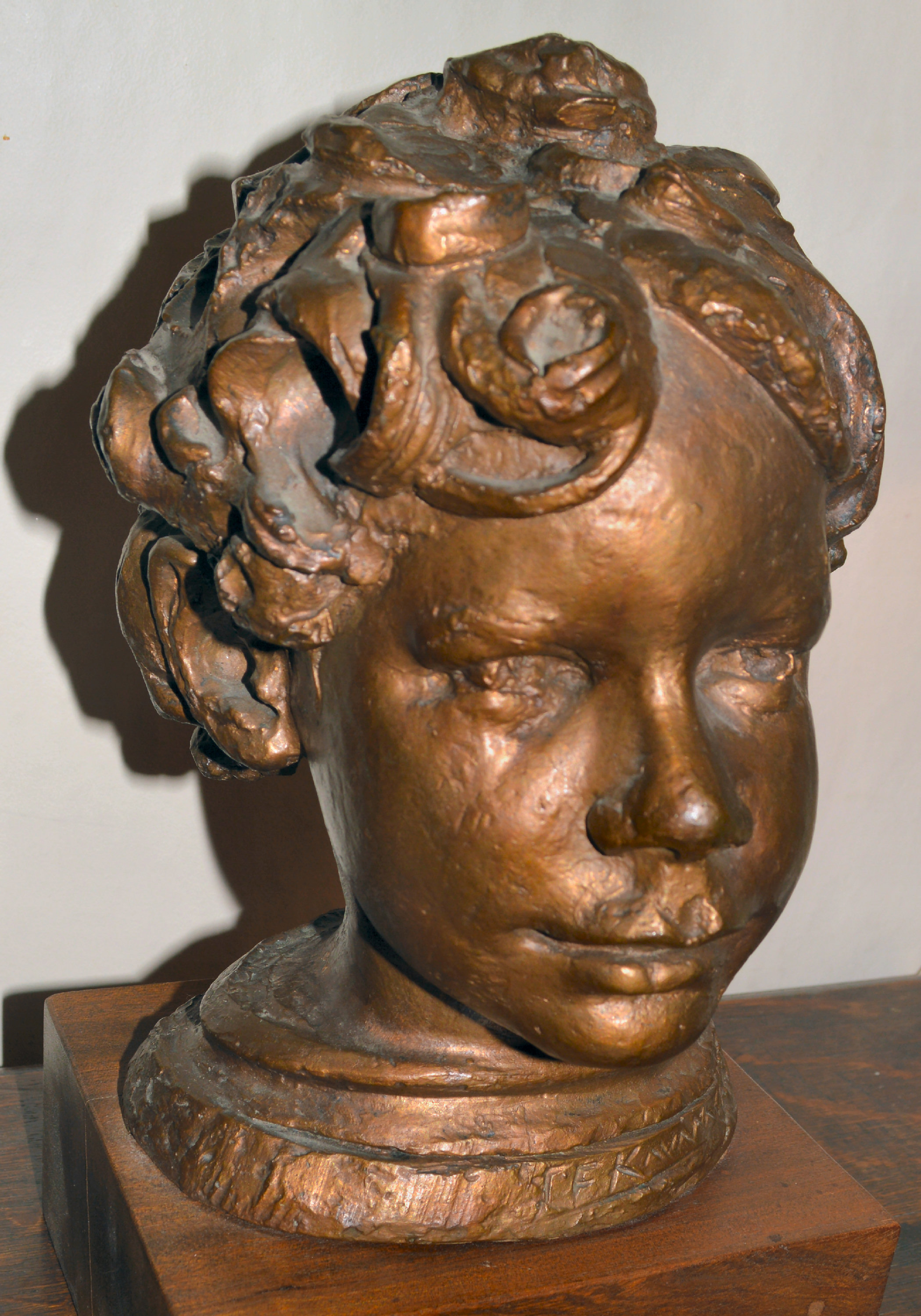
Head of Georgia Leprohon

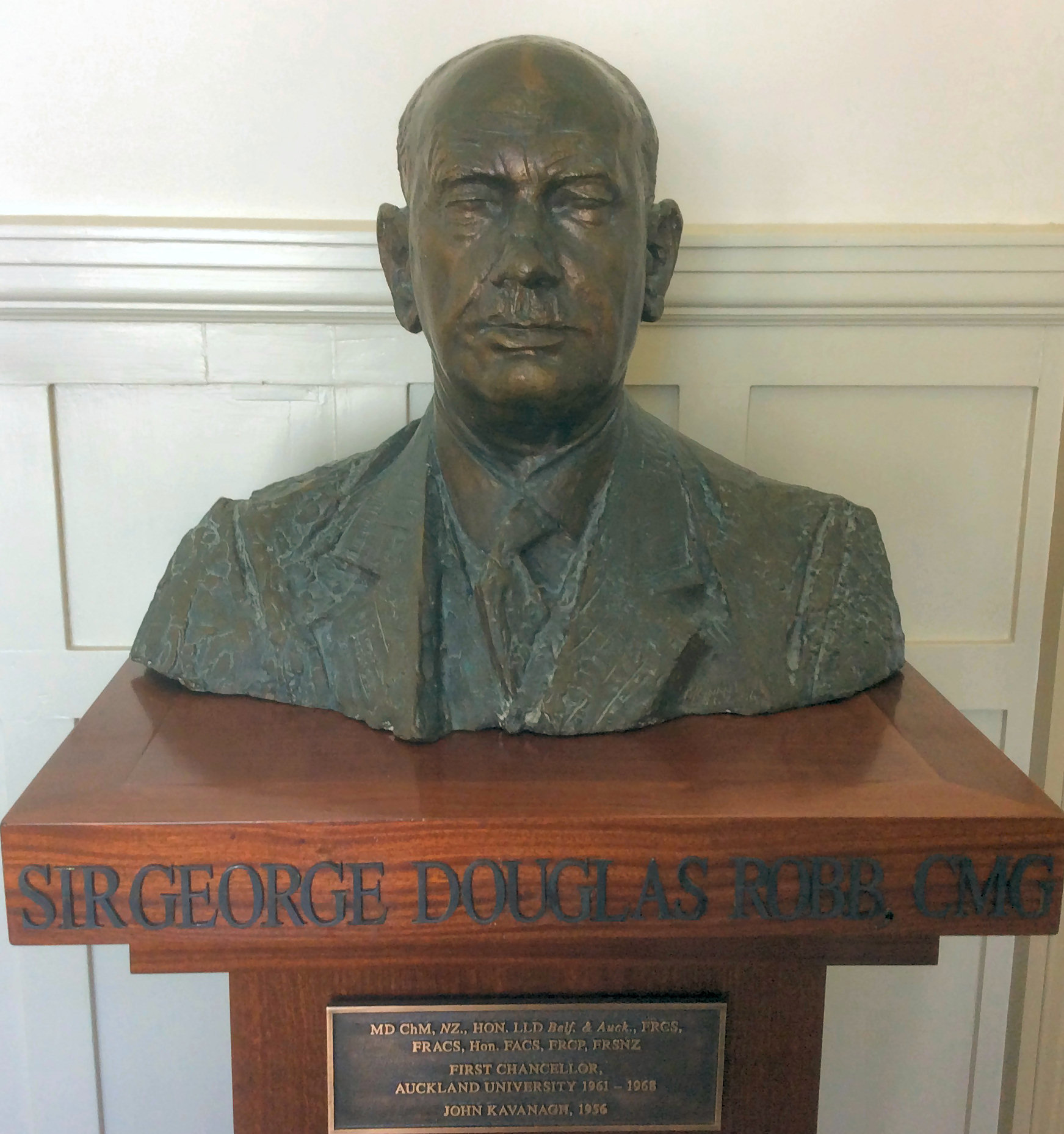
Sir Douglas Robb

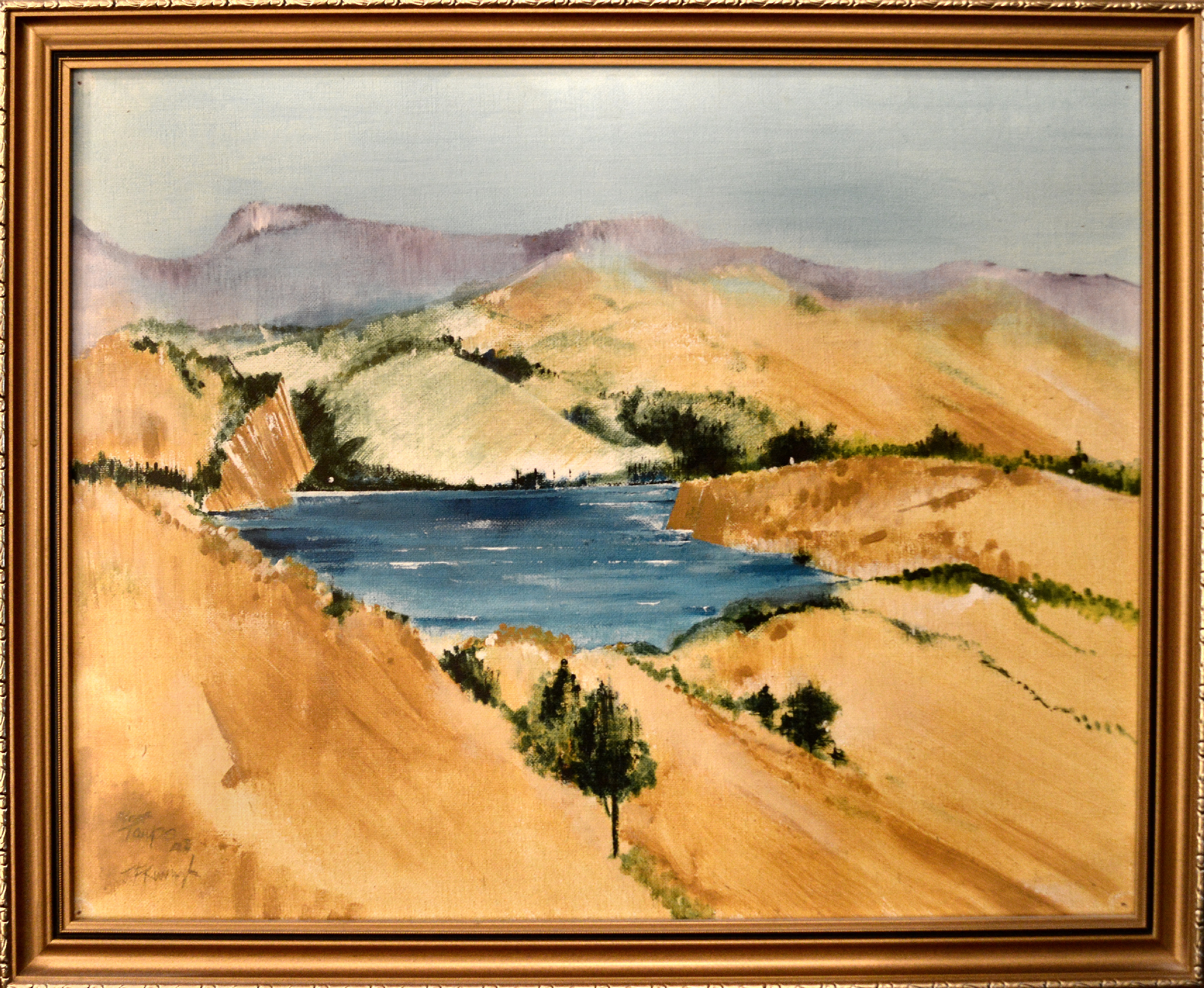
Lake Taupo

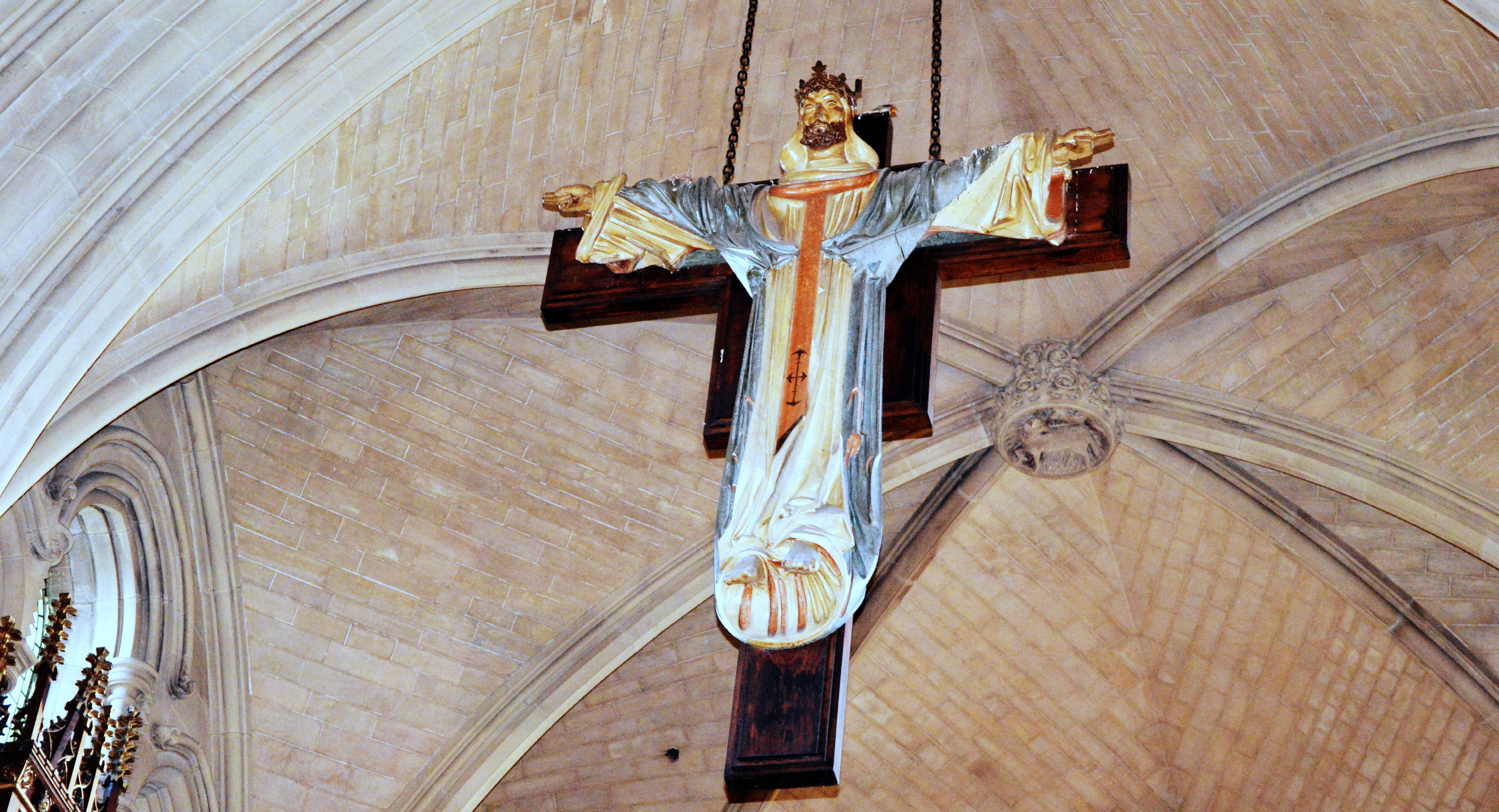
Rood Cross, All Souls, Leeds

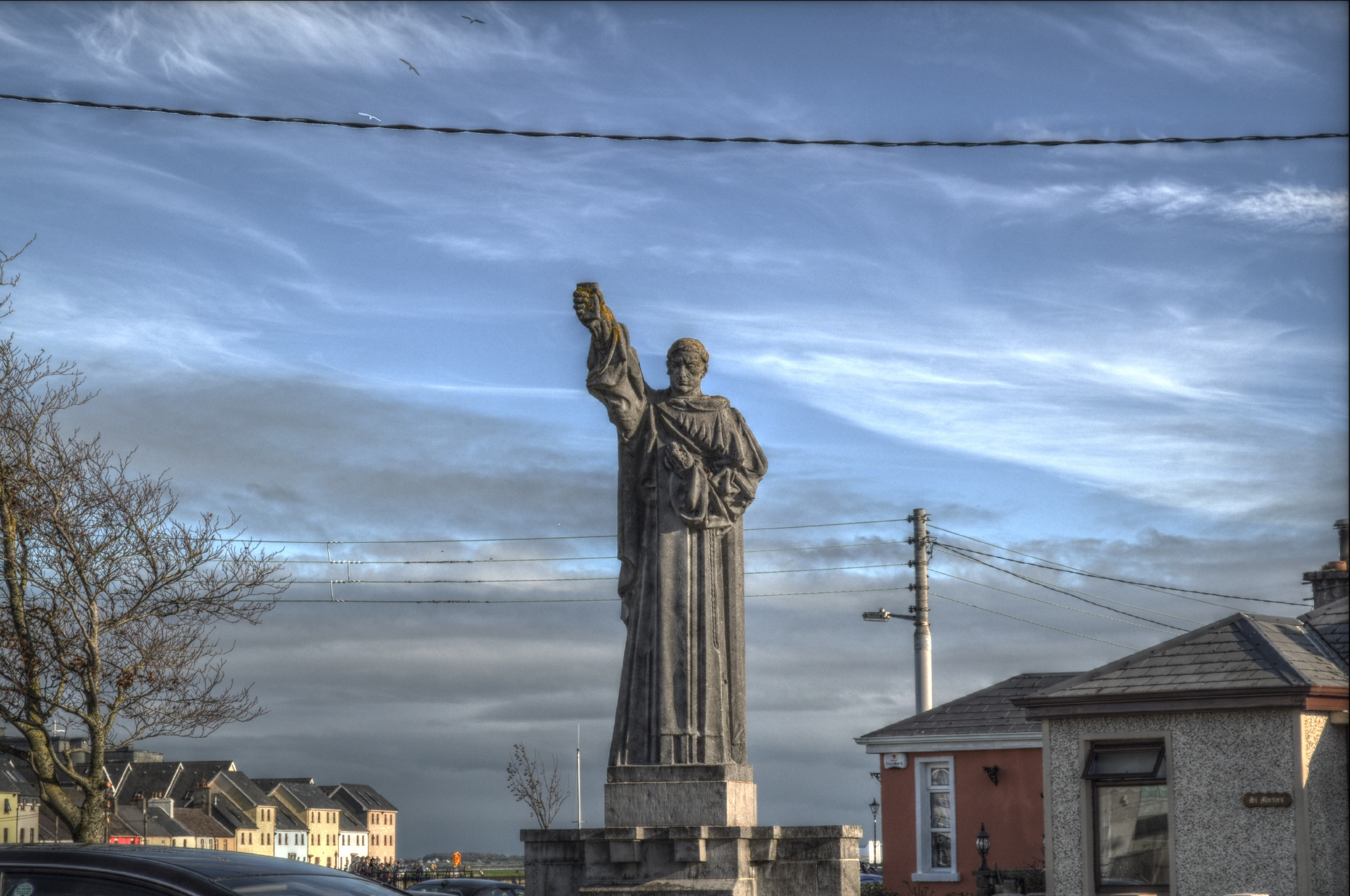
Statue of Thomas Burke
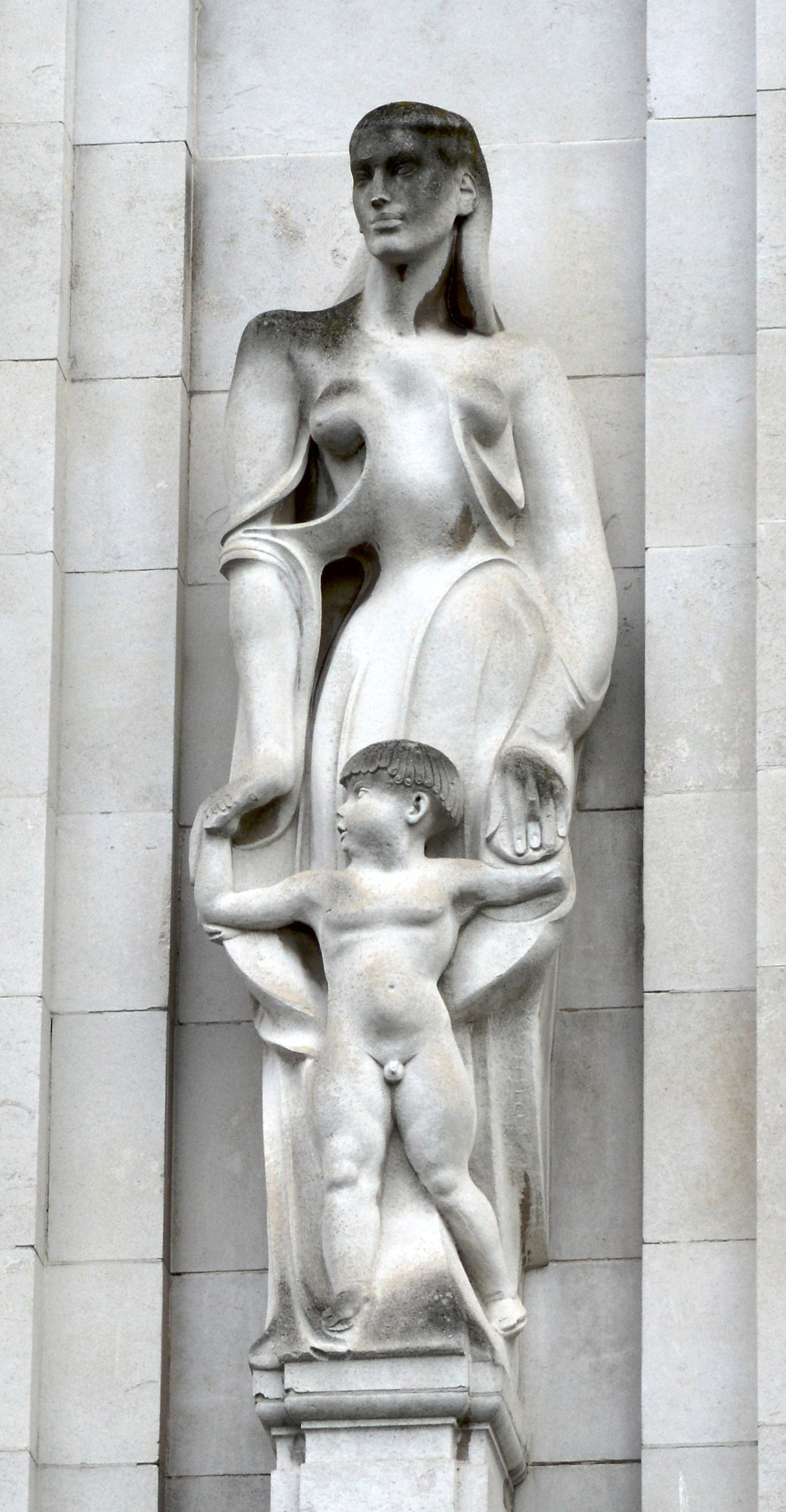
"Education". Walthamstow

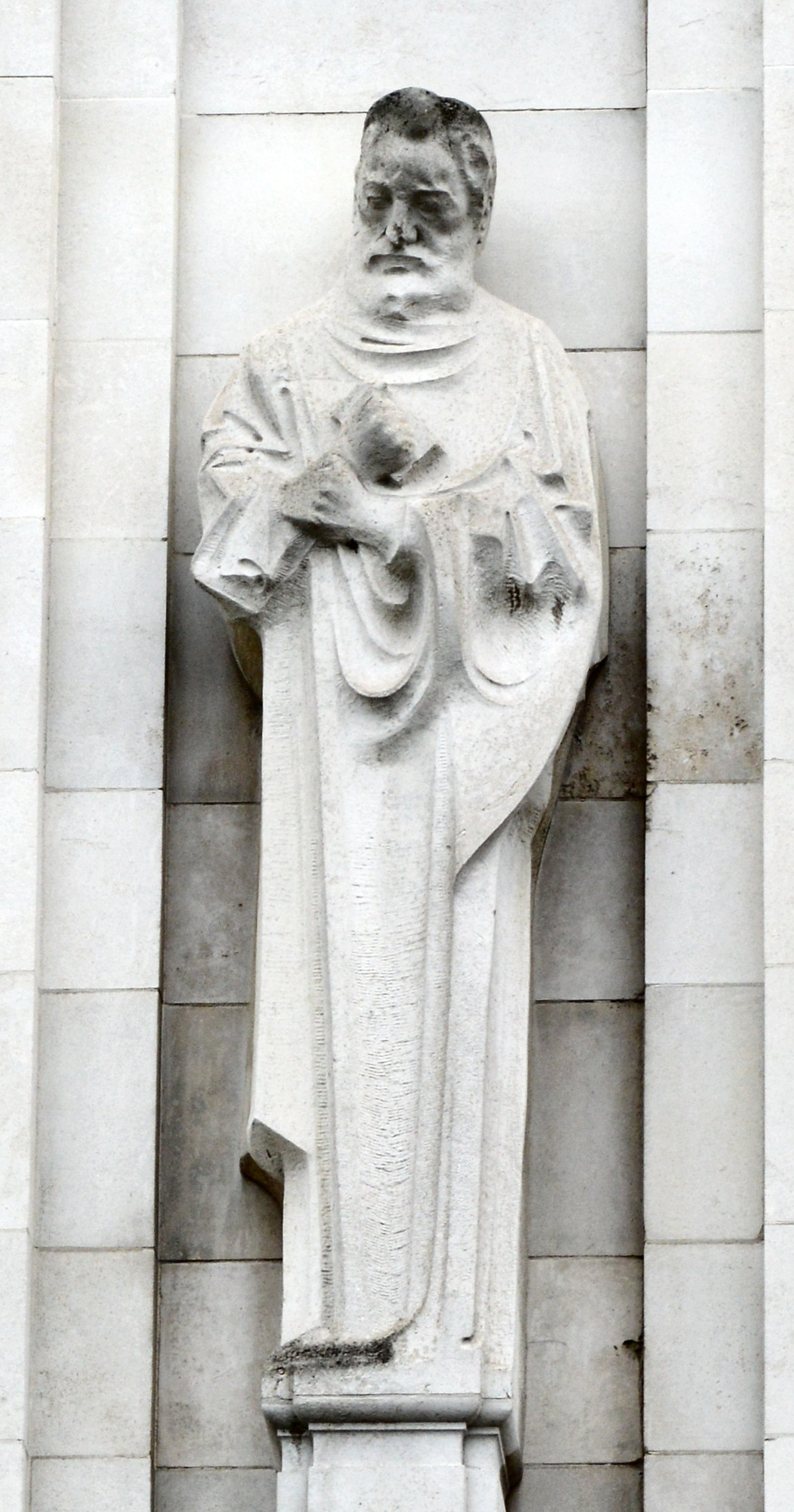
"Fellowship". Walthamstow

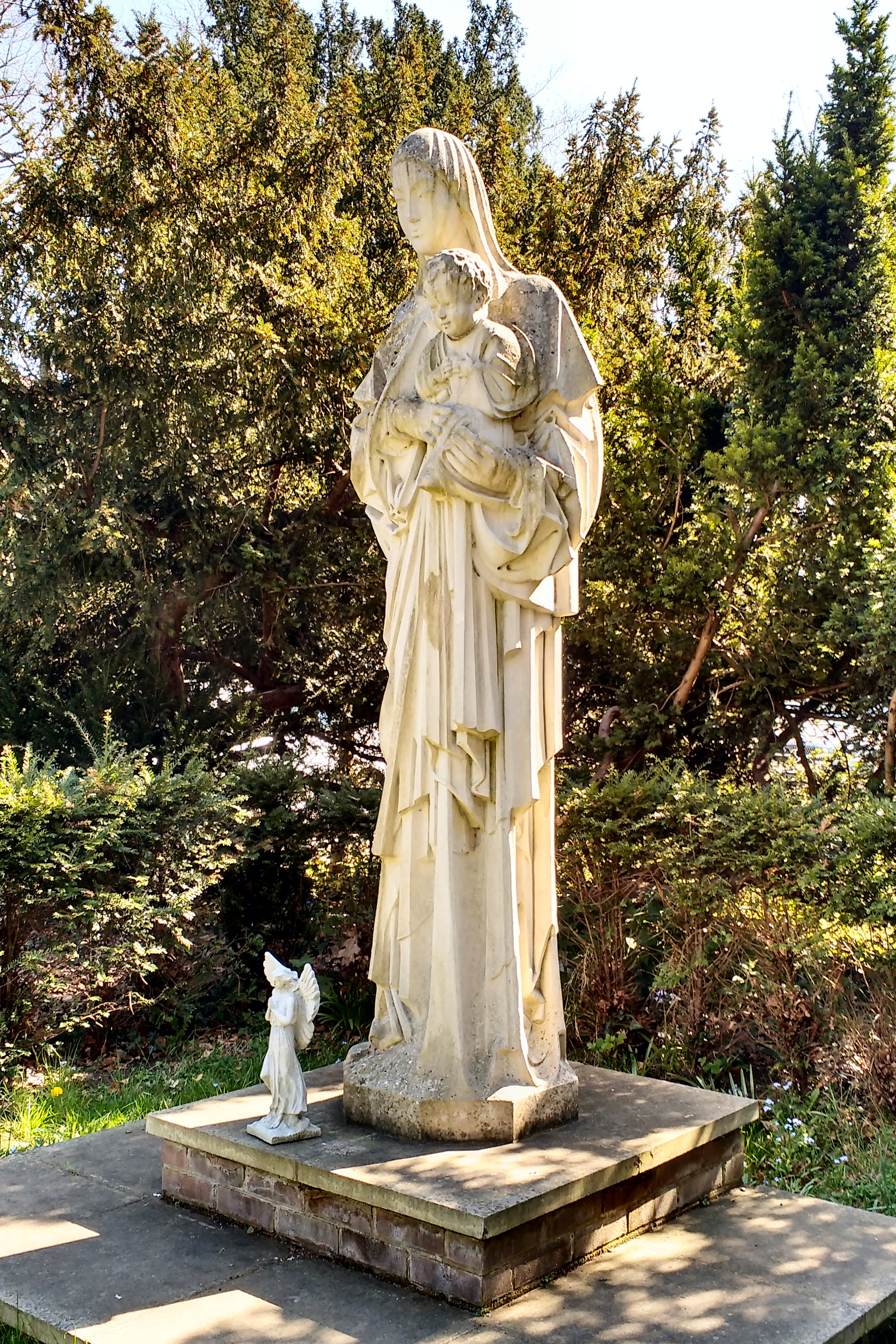
Our Lady of Consolation. Frimley

=== War years ===
Another commission in 1940 was for the Catholic Hospital, Lambeth Road, London. This is a nine foot high limestone statue of Our Lady of Consolation which stood above the entrance to the hospital, so taking foreshortening into consideration. A bronze model, "Madonna and Child", was exhibited at the Royal Academy in 1944. The hospital closed in 1984 and the statue is now outside Our Lady Queen of Heaven Church in Frimley, Surrey. His "Greyhound" (1940) was commissioned by two London bookmakers at the Greyhound Racing Association and was cast in silver.

One of his finest portrait busts was the bronze of Cardinal Hinsley which was exhibited at the Royal Academy in 1939 and at the Royal Hibernian Academy in 1947; it is now in the Westminster Cathedral Clergy House Library. Another bust "Russian Peasant", a portrait of a Russian Jew he had ‘found’ on the Mile End Road in London's East End, was exhibited in 1943 and purchased by the Chantrey Bequest for the Tate Gallery. He also exhibited portraits of J.W.Dulanty and Sir Francis Joseph (1937) at the Royal Academy. He also sculpted the head of London model Sheila Maillard in 1940, who became the model for William Reid Dick's 1949 statue of Lady Godiva in Coventry.

He was commissioned to carve five corner figures, for which he received £440, and 16 low reliefs at £12 each for the Walthamstow Town Hall (1937–1942). The relief figures representing crafts and industries are in the entrance of the Town Hall on the sides of the portico piers and the five figures, which are classical in style, are at the rear on the council chamber. The five figures in Portland stone represent "Recreation", "Motherhood", "Fellowship", "Education" and "Work". The figure of "Fellowship" is based on William Morris who had lived locally. He also carved "Tragedy" and "Comedy" on either side of the Assembly Hall.

He won the competition in 1941 for a limestone statue of Father Burke, the Dominican preacher, holding a cross, for which he received £750. The figure, which stands in Galway, Eire, and is eight feet tall, was completed in 1948. His father had been an altar server for Fr Burke at St Saviour's, Dominick Street, Dublin.

=== Post-war ===
Statue of "Prince of Preachers"
At Walshe's Quarries, Leighlinbridge, Carlow, I watched Mr. John Kavanagh, F.R.B.S., Offaly born sculptor, finishing his nine-foot limestone figure of the great Father Tom Burke, O.P., "Prince of Preachers." The figure will be Galway's tribute to one of her greatest sons.

With Mount Leinster away on the horizon and amid the clatter of quarrymen's implements on the hard quarry rock, widely travelled John Kavanagh works in an improvised studio almost on the lip of the quarry pit. Since he began the work he has resided in a farmhouse about 3 miles from the quarry. He makes the journey to and fro in an ass and cart. The figure block came out of the pit weighing six tons. When completed the statue will weigh about half that. For 100 years the Walshes have worked their quarry.

Mr Kavanagh's head of the late Cardinal Hinsley was exhibited at the R.H.A. exhibition in Dublin last year. During his studies in Rome, he met the present Pope, then Cardinal Pacelli, and Signor Mussolini.

Also after the war he received a commission from the Ford Company of Dagenham for a statue of Spartacus as a monument to Free Europe. He also quoted £12,000 for a sculpture in Dublin to Thomas Davis but that was considered too expensive.

He submitted designs in 1947 for the competition to design the Holy Door of St. Peter's Basilica in Rome but his models for the bronze doors did not arrive in time because of difficulties with transport after the war.

In 1950 in a joint submission with the architect Daithi P. Hanly he won the Dublin Custom House Memorial competition, worth £100, with a design of Eire striding towards freedom defended by Fionn Mac Cumhaill's last shot. Unfortunately the project suffered delays and was never completed. The model is reported to have been taken to New Zealand.

=== New Zealand ===
In 1951 he took up the position of Senior Lecturer in Sculpture at the Elam School of Fine Arts, Auckland, New Zealand; he temporarily acted as head in 1960, retiring in 1968. His students include Greer Twiss and Marté Szirmay.

When in New Zealand he received few commissions. He designed the common seal for the Medical Research Council of New Zealand in 1951. His head of Kruschev (1961) was exhibited at the New Zealand Academy of Fine Art and in London. His bronze head of Sir Douglas Robb (1956), exhibited at the Royal Academy in 1957, is on display at the Old Government House and a portrait in oil (1961) is in the University of Auckland. A bronze head of Dr H.D. Robertson (1970) is in the Sarjeant Gallery. A portrait bust of the etcher W.P. Robins is owned by Murty Bros Inc. of New York. His sculpture of Battle-Waggon was displayed in 1973.

In 1978 he won the Grand Prix de Lyons with a bronze from the marble head of Georgia Leprohon, a four-year-old child, commissioned by her grandparents.

He had been producing drawings since early in his career but it was only after his retirement that he started painting, many being copies of portraits by old masters.

There were retrospective exhibitions of his sculpture at the Auckland City Art Gallery in 1979 and of his paintings and drawings at the Auckland Society of Arts in 1980.

== Works exhibited at the Royal Academy ==
Year	Title	Type
1933	Tanith	Bronze statue
	Wanda Tiburzzi	Bronze bust
	Il Vecchio	Bronze head
1934	Colin St Clair Oakes	Bronze head
	Not named	Bronze head
1935	The Dance of the Hours	Relief
1936	Dr P Duval	Bronze bust
1937	J.W.Dulanty	Bronze bust
	Sir Francis Joseph	Bronze head
	Half-length portrait	Bronze
1939	Cardinal Hinsley	Bronze bust
1943	Head of a Russian Peasant	Bronze head
1944	A Talbot	Bronze head
	Madonna and Child	Bronze statuette
1946	Cora Ann	Bronze statuette
	Torso	Bronze
	Cardinal Hinsley	Bust
1957	Dr Douglas Robb	Bronze bust

== Personal life ==
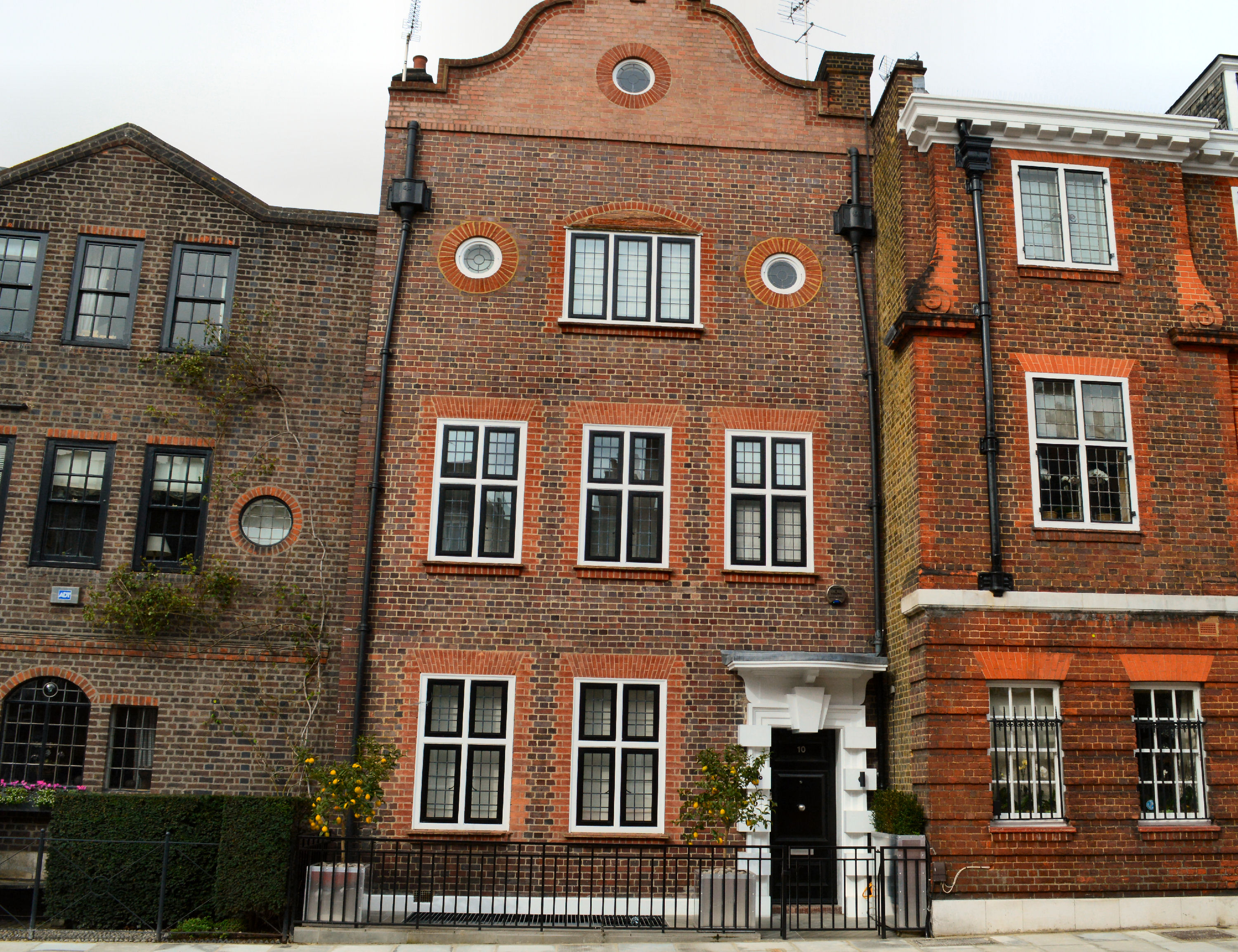
10 Mallord Street

He lived in 'The Little House', Mallord Street, Chelsea, London (1936–1946) with his studios at St. Oswald's Studios, Fulham (1934–1936) and then at Radnor Walk, Chelsea (1936–1943). He also had a studio at his father's house in Whalebone Lane, Chadwell Heath, Essex. In 1947 he gave his address as Lower Baggot Street, Dublin. In 1951 the family were at Upper Gardiner Street, Dublin. In New Zealand they first lived at Lonsdale Street, Ellerslie, where he had a studio in the stables. Later in 1984 they lived at Greenlane Rd, Remuera, Auckland. In 1958 the family returned to Britain and Ireland, also visiting Rome, for a year during his sabbatical leave.

He was married at Chelsea in 1942 to Jane Ella Cove (b 1892, Wimbledon), who died the following year leaving him a substantial amount in her will. His second marriage in Dublin (1950) was to Margaret O'Connor (1922–2004), known as Peggy, and they had two children, John (b 1950) and Carol (b. 1949); there was also Margaret's daughter Laura Francis (b 1944) from her first marriage.

He died in 1984 of a heart attack in Auckland, New Zealand, and is buried in Purewa Cemetery.
