= Listed buildings in the borough of Dartford, Kent =

There are about 180 Listed Buildings in the Borough of Dartford of Kent , which are buildings of architectural or historic interest.

- Grade I buildings are of exceptional interest.
- Grade II* buildings are particularly important buildings of more than special interest.
- Grade II buildings are of special interest.

The lists follow Historic England’s geographical organisation, with entries grouped by county, local authority, and parish (civil and non-civil). The following lists are arranged by parish.

Parish	Listed buildings list	Grade I	Grade II*	Grade II	Total
Bean	Listed buildings in Bean, Kent			4	4
Darenth	Listed buildings in Darenth	1		13	14
Dartford (non-civil parish)	Listed buildings in Dartford	1	3	46	50
Longfield and New Barn	Listed buildings in Longfield and New Barn		1	5	6
Southfleet	Listed buildings in Southfleet	1	3	39	43
Stone	Listed buildings in Stone, Kent	1		3	4
Sutton-at-Hone and Hawley	Listed buildings in Sutton-at-Hone and Hawley	1	2	14	17
Swanscombe and Greenhithe	Listed buildings in Swanscombe and Greenhithe	1	1	28	30
Wilmington	Listed buildings in Wilmington, Kent	1		12	13
Total	—	7	10	164	181
