= Bean, Kent =

Village in Kent, England

Coordinates: 51.4273°N 0.286°E

Bean
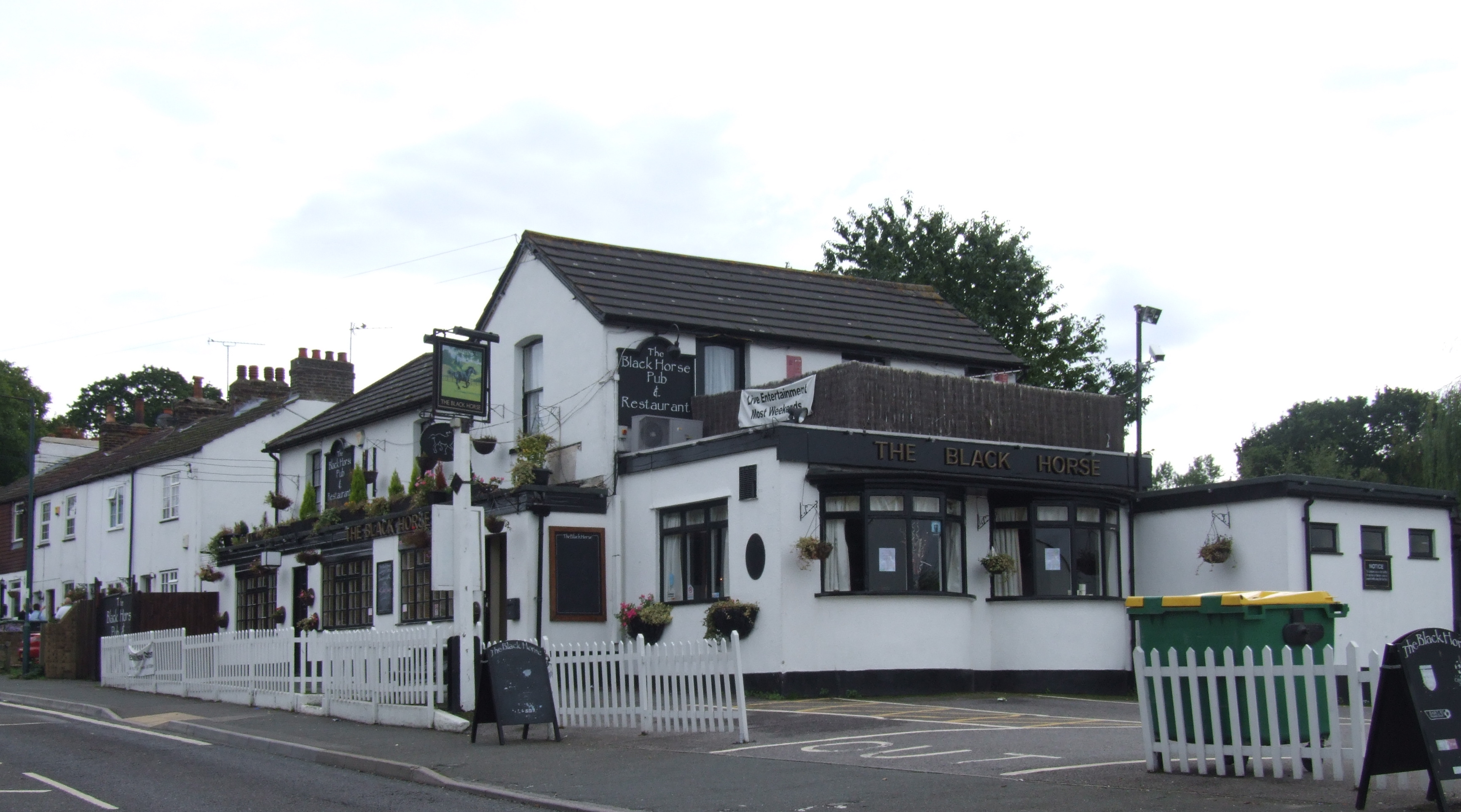
- The Black Horse

- Location within Kent
- Population: 1,643 (civil parish 2011)
- OS grid reference: TQ590722
- Civil parish: Bean
- District: Dartford
- Shire county: Kent
- Region: South East
- Country: England
- Sovereign state: United Kingdom
- Post town: Dartford
- Postcode district: DA2
- Dialling code: 01474
- Police: Kent
- Fire: Kent
- Ambulance: South East Coast
- UK Parliament: Dartford

Bean is a village and civil parish in the Borough of Dartford, Kent, England. It is located 4.4 miles south east of Dartford and 5.4 miles south west of Gravesend. In 2011 the parish had a population of 1643.

== The Area ==
The parish is bounded on the north by the A2 road (the Roman Watling Street), and on the other three sides by ancient woodlands. It is the most recently formed of Kent parishes, although the village itself has been recorded since at least the 13th century. Bean was formerly part of the parish of Stone, but the boundary was such that it was connected to the rest of Stone by only a narrow neck of land at Watling Street (A2). In 1797 this part of the parish of Stone is described as having great tract of woodland which reached almost to Green Street Green, adjoining to Darenth parish. Along the northern boundary of these woods, runs the ancient Roman road to Rochester (now the A2) and not far from this road were the two small hamlets of Bean and Stonewood. On the hill above Green Street Green, among the woods, were the remains of a camp and fortifications, thrown up in ancient times, but then so overgrown with wood and rubbish, as to be impenetrable.

== Transport ==
=== Rail ===
The nearest National Rail stations to Bean are Longfield, located 2.2 miles away and Greenhithe, located 2.4 miles away.

=== Buses ===
Public transport in Bean is provided by Brookline Coaches route 479, which links the village to Bluewater and New Ash Green.

==== Bean Road Underpass ====
The Bean Road Underpass is a planned Fastrack bus rapid transit infrastructure project. It involves constructing a new 75 m underpass through the chalk ridge beneath B255 Bean Road between the Whitecliffe/Eastern Quarry housing development and Bluewater Shopping Centre to provide a direct, uncongested route for Fastrack services. It will include a dedicated 3.5 m‑wide Fastrack busway alongside a shared pedestrian and cycle path. Once completed it will form part of the Fastrack network serving Dartford and Gravesham, improving public transport connectivity between Ebbsfleet Garden City, Bluewater, and beyond. Planning permission was granted in March 2025, with construction expected to begin in early 2026 and finish by 2027 under Kent County Council’s delivery, and an £18 million construction contract has been awarded.

== See also ==
- Listed buildings in Bean, Kent
