= Listed buildings in Stone, Kent =

Civil Parish in Kent, England

Stone is a village and civil parish in the Borough of Dartford of Kent, England. It contains one grade I and three grade II listed buildings that are recorded in the National Heritage List for England.

This list is based on the information retrieved online from Historic England.

== Key ==
Grade	Criteria
I	Buildings that are of exceptional interest
II*	Particularly important buildings of more than special interest
II	Buildings that are of special interest

== Listing ==
Name	Grade	Location	Type	Completed (Note: The date given is the date used by Historic England as significant for the initial building or that of an important part in the structure's description.)	Date designated	Grid ref. (Note: The grid reference is based on the British national grid reference system, sometimes known as OSGB36, used by the Ordnance Survey.) Geo-coordinates	Notes	Entry number (Note: The "List Entry Number" is a unique number assigned to each listed building and scheduled monument by Historic England.)	Image	Wikidata
Chapel of St Luke at Stone House Hospital, Built As the City of London Asylum	II	Built As The City Of London Asylum, Cotton Lane			17 March 1982	TQ5611074241; 51°26′44″N 0°14′42″E		1085809	Upload Photo	Q26374386
Stone Castle	II	London Road			1 August 1952	TQ5839574061; 51°26′36″N 0°16′40″E		1099902	Upload Photo	Q7618887
Church of St Mary	I	Rectory Road			1 June 1967	TQ5764174810; 51°27′01″N 0°16′02″E		1085810	Church of St Mary More images	Q17529670
Administrative, Ward and Service Ranges to Stone House Hospital, Built As the City of London Asylum	II	Ward And Service Ranges To Stone House Hospital, Built As The City Of London Asylum, Cotton Lane			17 March 1982	TQ5613274158; 51°26′42″N 0°14′43″E		1348698	Upload Photo	Q26632059

== See also ==
- Grade I listed buildings in Kent
- Grade II* listed buildings in Kent

== Sources ==
- Newman, John (2012) [1969], Kent: West and the Weald, The Buildings of England, New Haven and London: Yale University Press, ISBN 978-0-300-18509-6
