= New Barn =

Coordinates: 51.395480°N 0.326980°E

- Location within Kent
- Civil parish: Longfield and New Barn
- District: Dartford
- Shire county: Kent
- Region: South East
- Country: England
- Sovereign state: United Kingdom
- Post town: LONGFIELD
- Postcode district: DA3
- Dialling code: 01474
- Police: Kent
- Fire: Kent
- Ambulance: South East Coast
- UK Parliament: Dartford

New Barn is a village in Kent, England. It is a compact residential area surrounded by open fields which lies four miles southwest of Gravesend. It is in the local government district of Dartford. The villages of New Barn and Longfield are within and give their names to the civil parish of Longfield and New Barn. New Barn is larger in population than Longfield, although has little in the way of services, being a recent development and purely residential in nature

== History ==
Historically New Barn was divided between the parishes of Southfleet, Longfield and Northfleet. The greater part was in the parish of Southfleet, including New Barn House, New Barn Road, Southfleet Avenue and the western sections of Longfield and Fawkham Avenues up to the parish boundary, which bisected these roads in a north–south direction. To the south, Southfleet parish extended up to Pescot Avenue, with the boundary running east–west.

Southfleet and Longfield were both part of Dartford Rural District and prior to that the Hundred of Axstane. Northfleet became an urban district, governed by Northfleet Urban District Council. Under the Local Government Act 1972, Southfleet, Longfield and Northfleet were allocated to the districts of Dartford, Sevenoaks and Gravesham respectively, but in 1987 New Barn was unified and transferred to the new parish of Longfield and New Barn within the borough of Dartford.

In the centre of New Barn lies New Barn House, a 16th-century timber-framed building, which became a Grade II listed building in 1982. On 19th century maps this was shown as New Barn Farm. Much of the grounds (including the well) have been sold and developed as the residential cul-de-sac of Bentley Close.

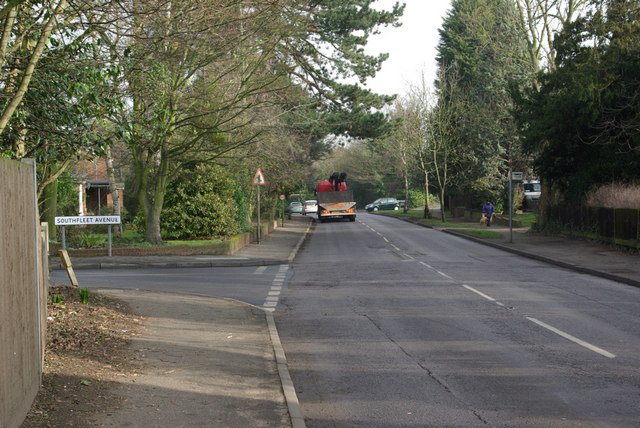
New Barn Road as it passes the grounds of New Barn House (right)

== Parish Council ==
Longfield and New Barn is a Civil Parish within the Borough (or District) of Dartford. The Parish Council is made up of 4 wards with 12 Parish Councillors. New Barn West ward has 3 Councillors and New Barn East ward has 4 Councillors

== Ecclesiastic Parish ==
Most of New Barn lies in the ecclesiastic Parish of Southfleet, whose church is St. Nicholas Church in Southfleet. Only the part in the former parish of Longfield comes within Longfield for church purposes.

== Population ==
According to the Kent (District Boundaries) Order 1987 the population of the part of New Barn formerly in Gravesham was 775, while the population of the part already in Dartford was 1,920.

The boundary between New Barn and Longfield within the old parish of Longfield or the new parish of Longfield and New Barn was not defined. However the extent of the contiguous built up area of New Barn south of the former boundary, i.e. that part already in Longfield parish, can be seen on the Ordnance Survey map. Also, the part of New Barn in Longfield parish was defined in the submission by Gravesham to the boundary review reported in the Local Government Boundary Commission For England Report No. 494, 28 February 1985 This put the boundary along the centre of the B260 (Main Road Longfield) including within New Barn the roads Pescot Avenue, The Drive, Hill View Road and the new development at The Yews. The Gravesham scheme would include 18 per cent of the population of the old parish of Longfield, namely around 400.

Thus the population of New Barn was around 3,100 at the time of the 1985 boundary review (previous Census 1981).

The last Census for which detailed local figures are available is 2001. The census enumeration districts are not delimited such as to give an exact figure for New Barn. However the total for the parish, 4,866 in 2001, is roughly the same as when the parish was created. Therefore, it is likely that New Barn's population is still roughly 3,100. The allocation of parish councillors to the New Barn wards (7 out of 12) is consistent with this.

== Topography ==
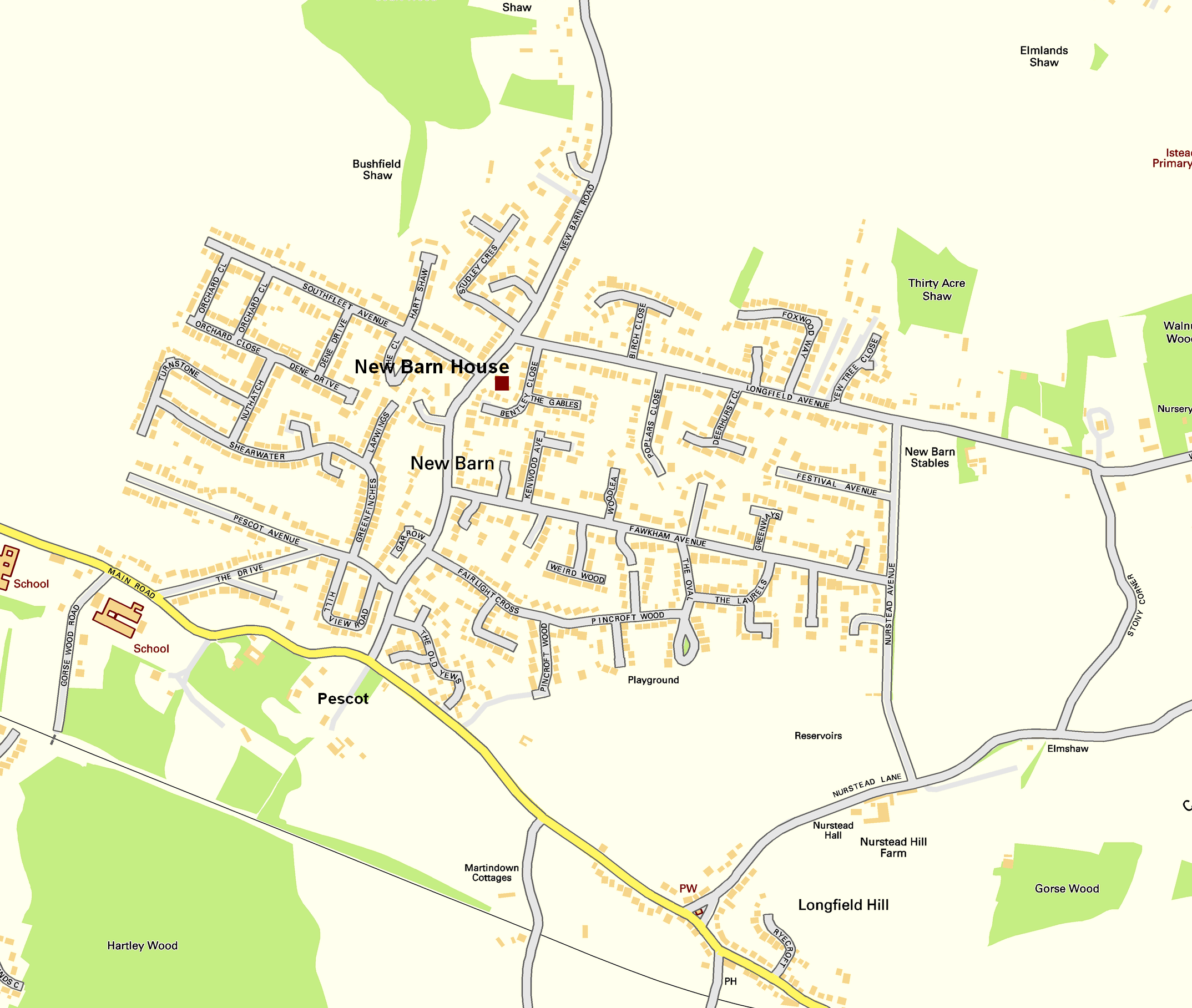
New Barn, Kent

New Barn is on a hill, height 303 ft. on the north side of the dry valley of Longfield

New Barn originates from a former landed estate, the New Barn Estate. It is compact residential area surrounded by open, mainly farming, type land and separated by open land from the village of Southfleet and from Longfield to the south-west; it is separated from Istead Rise to the north-east and Meopham to the south-east.

As one walks along Main Road, Longfield (B260) in an easterly direction there is on the left a bare hillside escarpment with along the main road a ribbon of development also on that side and on the other (south) side Longfield School and its playing fields. About two-thirds of the way along the bare hillside stops and the hillside is covered by the development of The Drive, Pescot Avenue and Hill View Road and the new development at the Yews, which together form the part of New Barn previously in Longfield parish, while on the south side of the main road lie the other two schools and other development. The New Barn development at the top of the hill is clearly visible from Longfield School grounds, while Longfield School and the main village in the valley below is visible from the end of Pescot Avenue.

If one continues along Main Road one comes to the separate village of Longfield Hill, which is on rising ground and in effect closes this end of the valley. Here also the road and railway cross at the extreme eastern end of the Parish. Longfield Hill itself is a small village with a village green, public house, one or two shops and a Mission Church.

The main access to the New Barn development is New Barn Road which runs up the escarpment and through the middle of New Barn. It then runs on to the end of the main New Barn development and comes to the long ribbon of mainly larger properties which the Ratepayers Association wanted added to the New Barn unification scheme, but remains in Southfleet parish. Here one is over the hill and the land and the road falls away to the Thames estuary and one has a very broad vista lying before one over parts of Northfleet and Swanscombe to the river, with the development of Istead Rise on a separate hill in the right foreground; there are a number of tall chimneys prominent in the landscape. The road continues down through the edge of the Parish of Southfleet into Northfleet and Gravesend. The ex-Gravesham part of New Barn lies along the east side of New Barn and is at much the same level as Longfield Hill.
