= Longfield Chalk Bank =

Nature reserve in Kent, England

Coordinates: 51.400°N 0.296°E

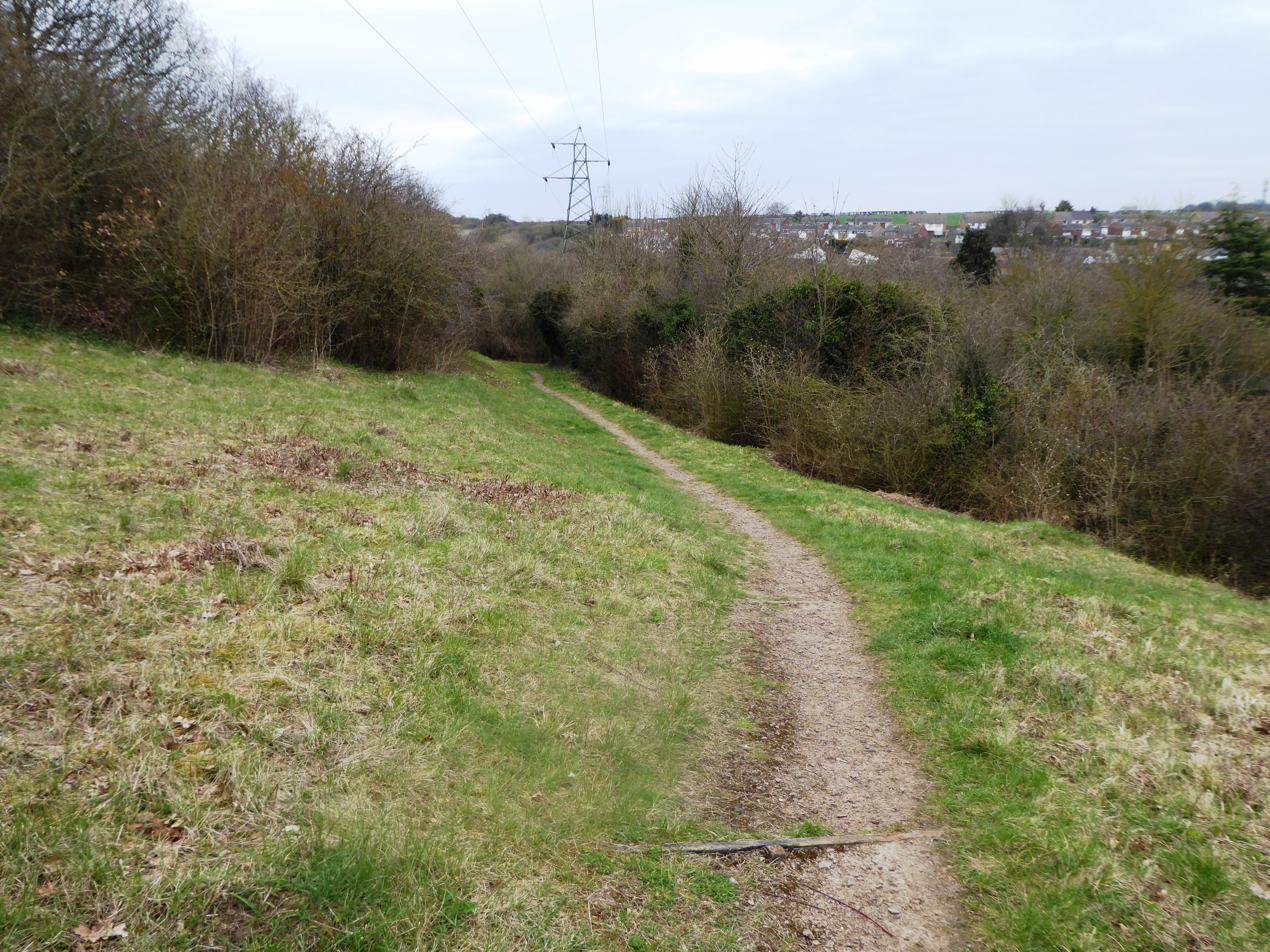
- Interactive map of Longfield Chalk Bank
- Type: Nature reserve
- Location: Longfield, Kent
- OS grid: TQ 598 693
- Area: 2 hectares (4.9 acres)
- Manager: Kent Wildlife Trust

Longfield Chalk Bank is a 2-hectare (4.9-acre) nature reserve in Longfield in Kent. It is managed by the Kent Wildlife Trust.

This chalk grassland site also has areas of woodland and scrub. Fauna include the common blue butterfly, slow worm, common lizard and willow warbler.

There is access from West Shaw.
