= Sutton-at-Hone and Hawley =

Civil parish in Kent, England

Coordinates: 51°25′N 0°14′E

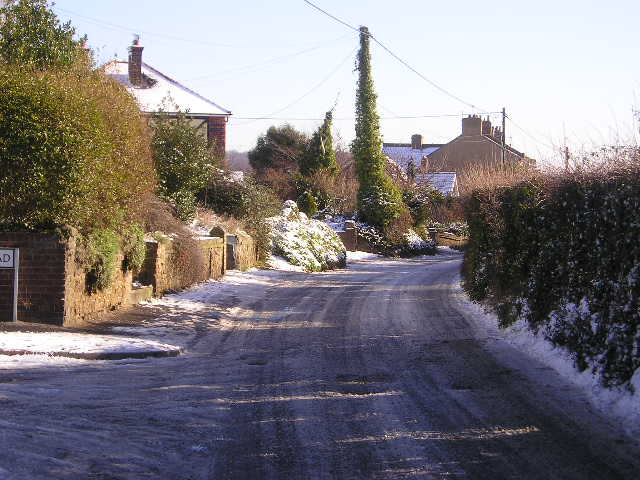
- Picture taken in the snow at the top of Shirehall Road, Hawley

- Location within Kent
- Interactive map of Sutton-at-Hone and Hawley
- Population: 4,230 (2011 census)
- Civil parish: Sutton-at-Hone and Hawley
- District: Dartford
- Shire county: Kent
- Region: South East
- Country: England
- Sovereign state: United Kingdom

Sutton-at-Hone and Hawley is a civil parish within the Borough of Dartford in Kent, England. It lies to the south of the urban part of the Borough, and consists of the two settlements named, both to the west of the River Darent, one of the parish boundaries. The M25 motorway divides them. It has a population of 4,133, increasing to 4,230 at the 2011 Census.

== History of the parish ==
In former times, when Kent was administered through areas known as lathes, Sutton-at-Hone was a half-lathe. It covered an area well in excess of Dartford Borough as it is today. The half-lathe embraced a number of towns and villages including Dartford (Darentford) and Hawley. 1894 saw the formation of the Parish Council of Sutton-at-Hone under the Local Government Act of that year. At that time the Council's area included Sutton-at-Hone, Hawley, Swanley Junction, Swanley Village, Hextable and Crockenhill. In 1955 many parish boundaries were changed dramatically and the Parish was reduced to just Sutton-at-Hone and Hawley. In the late 1970s the parish was renamed Sutton-at-Hone and Hawley Parish Council to reflect its specific administration area see

== St John's Jerusalem ==
Within the parish is the one-time Commandery of the Knights Hospitallers of the Order of St John of Jerusalem. Now in the hands of the National Trust, the garden and 13th century chapel are open to the public.

Farningham Road railway station is also located within the parish.

== See also ==
- Listed buildings in Sutton-at-Hone and Hawley
