= Listed buildings in Dartford =

Civil Parish in Kent, England

Dartford is town and a non-civil parish in the Borough of Dartford of Kent, England. It contains one grade I, three grade II* and 46 grade II listed buildings that are recorded in the National Heritage List for England.

This list is based on the information retrieved online from Historic England

== Key ==
Grade	Criteria
I	Buildings that are of exceptional interest
II*	Particularly important buildings of more than special interest
II	Buildings that are of special interest

== Listing ==
Name	Grade	Location	Type	Completed (Note: The date given is the date used by Historic England as significant for the initial building or that of an important part in the structure's description.)	Date designated	Grid ref. (Note: Sometimes known as OSGB36, the grid reference is based on the British national grid reference system used by the Ordnance Survey.) Geo-coordinates	Notes	Entry number (Note: The "List Entry Number" is a unique number assigned to each listed building and scheduled monument by Historic England.)	Image	Wikidata
Christ Church	II	Cross Road			25 September 1975	TQ5312574134; 51°26′44″N 0°12′07″E		1336346	Upload Photo	Q26620841
Old Mansion Villa at Bexley Mental Hospital	II	Dartford Heath			25 September 1975	TQ5091372773; 51°26′02″N 0°10′11″E		1086054	Upload Photo	Q26375533
Coal Duty Boundary Marker (on the South Side of Number 1)	II	Dartford Road, Bexley			17 December 1980	TQ5070172875; 51°26′05″N 0°10′00″E		1188345	Upload Photo	Q26483496
Grammar School	II	Dartford Road			25 September 1975	TQ5340374194; 51°26′45″N 0°12′22″E		1086055	Upload Photo	Q5225614
Milestone Opposite Nos 179 and 179a	II	Dartford Road			25 September 1975	TQ5263874392; 51°26′53″N 0°11′43″E		1336347	Upload Photo	Q26620842
Gartley Cottages	II	38-52, Dartford Road			25 September 1975	TQ5302974335; 51°26′50″N 0°12′03″E		1336367	Upload Photo	Q26620861
Martyr's Monument in St Edmund's Chartered Graveyard	II	East Hill			25 September 1975	TQ5463573972; 51°26′37″N 0°13′25″E		1086023	Upload Photo	Q26375406
St Edmund's Chartered Churchyard	II	East Hill			25 September 1975	TQ5468073995; 51°26′38″N 0°13′28″E		1086024	Upload Photo	Q26375411
14 and 16, East Hill	II	14 and 16, East Hill			22 April 1985	TQ5457373998; 51°26′38″N 0°13′22″E		1251332	Upload Photo	Q26543303
Acacia Hall	II	High Street			25 September 1975	TQ5438073900; 51°26′35″N 0°13′12″E		1086027	Upload Photo	Q26375421
Church of the Holy Trinity	I	High Street			22 December 1953	TQ5440473996; 51°26′38″N 0°13′13″E		1086029	Upload Photo	Q17529680
The Bridge House	II	High Street			22 December 1953	TQ5441973956; 51°26′37″N 0°13′14″E		1086026	Upload Photo	Q26375416
The Royal Victoria and Bull Inn	II*	High Street			22 December 1953	TQ5417174024; 51°26′39″N 0°13′01″E		1086025	Upload Photo	Q17557327
11, High Street	II	11, High Street			6 November 2007	TQ5420974020; 51°26′39″N 0°13′03″E		1392304	Upload Photo	Q26671531
15, High Street	II	15, High Street			6 November 2007	TQ5421974021; 51°26′39″N 0°13′04″E		1392298	Upload Photo	Q26671526
44, High Street	II	44, High Street			25 September 1975	TQ5428574039; 51°26′40″N 0°13′07″E		1336370	Upload Photo	Q26620863
45, High Street	II*	45, High Street			22 December 1953	TQ5431174002; 51°26′38″N 0°13′09″E		1336369	Upload Photo	Q17557358
The Wat Tyler Public House	II	80, High Street			25 September 1975	TQ5437174014; 51°26′39″N 0°13′12″E		1086028	Upload Photo	Q26375427
82, High Street	II	82, High Street			22 December 1953	TQ5437974007; 51°26′38″N 0°13′12″E		1336371	Upload Photo	Q26620864
151 and 151a, Hythe Street	II	151 and 151a, Hythe Street			25 September 1975	TQ5423774652; 51°26′59″N 0°13′06″E		1116247	Upload Photo	Q26409885
Priory Farmhouse Containing the Remains of Dartford Priory Gatehouse	II*	Kingsfield Terrace			22 December 1953	TQ5393874402; 51°26′52″N 0°12′50″E		1086030	Upload Photo	Q17557336
Victoria Road	II	Kingsfield Terrace And Priory Road			22 December 1953	TQ5393574618; 51°26′59″N 0°12′50″E		1086053	Upload Photo	Q26375528
The Two Brewers Public House	II	33, Lowfield Street			25 September 1975	TQ5413673902; 51°26′35″N 0°12′59″E		1336335	Upload Photo	Q26620830
Almshouses	II	41 and 43, Lowfield Street			27 September 1973	TQ5412673872; 51°26′34″N 0°12′59″E		1320067	Upload Photo	Q26606108
Coal Duty Boundary Marker at Junction with Crayford Road	II	Maiden Lane, Crayford			21 April 1986	TQ5234674473; 51°26′56″N 0°11′28″E		1064211	Upload Photo	Q26317435
Post on East Side	II	Just South Of Railway Embankment And North Of Cranford House, Maiden Lane			25 September 1975	TQ5240574692; 51°27′03″N 0°11′31″E		1116091	Upload Photo	Q26409748
Dartford Museum	II	Market Street			25 September 1975	TQ5431573907; 51°26′35″N 0°13′09″E		1336336	Upload Photo	Q5225616
Dartford War Memorial	II	Market Street			15 June 2006	TQ5427773915; 51°26′36″N 0°13′07″E		1393845	Upload Photo	Q26672983
1 and 3, Overy Street	II	1 and 3, Overy Street			25 September 1975	TQ5450074001; 51°26′38″N 0°13′18″E		1116074	Upload Photo	Q26409731
5-9, Overy Street	II	5-9, Overy Street			22 December 1953	TQ5450074014; 51°26′39″N 0°13′18″E		1086032	Upload Photo	Q26375436
11 and 13, Overy Street	II	11 and 13, Overy Street			25 September 1975	TQ5450874028; 51°26′39″N 0°13′19″E		1336337	Upload Photo	Q26620832
15, Overy Street	II	15, Overy Street			25 September 1975	TQ5450074028; 51°26′39″N 0°13′18″E		1116084	Upload Photo	Q26409741
17, Overy Street	II	17, Overy Street			25 September 1975	TQ5449874035; 51°26′39″N 0°13′18″E		1086033	Upload Photo	Q26375442
Post at North West Corner of Road at Junction with Dartford Road Outside No 8	II	Princes Road			25 September 1975	TQ5221574476; 51°26′56″N 0°11′21″E		1116059	Upload Photo	Q26409717
Zion Strict Baptist Chapel	II	Priory Hill			25 September 1975	TQ5380974185; 51°26′45″N 0°12′43″E		1336338	Upload Photo	Q26620833
Beadles	II	Spital Street			21 May 1999	TQ5400674064; 51°26′41″N 0°12′53″E		1387277	Upload Photo	Q26666936
Kent House	II	Spital Street			25 September 1975	TQ5398074116; 51°26′42″N 0°12′52″E		1336339	Upload Photo	Q26620834
Methodist Church	II	Spital Street			25 September 1975	TQ5400274113; 51°26′42″N 0°12′53″E		1086035	Upload Photo	Q26375447
The Coach and Horses Public House	II	Spital Street			25 September 1975	TQ5407774085; 51°26′41″N 0°12′57″E		1116040	Upload Photo	Q26409698
53 and 55, Spital Street	II	53 and 55, Spital Street			25 September 1975	TQ5394674114; 51°26′42″N 0°12′50″E		1115767	Upload Photo	Q26409457
The Royal Oak Public House	II	57, Spital Street			25 September 1975	TQ5392374117; 51°26′42″N 0°12′49″E		1086036	Upload Photo	Q26375451
War Memorial in the churchyard of St Alban's Church	II	North-west corner of St Alban's Churchyard, St Alban's Church, St Alban's Road			14 November 2014	TQ5492874105; 51°26′41″N 0°13′41″E		1422533	Upload Photo	Q26676957
Mortuary Chapel at Watling Street Burial Ground	II	Watling Street			25 September 1975	TQ5586073582; 51°26′23″N 0°14′28″E		1320275	Upload Photo	Q26606293
Former Dartford Union Workhouse Buildings to Rear and North East of Range Fronting West Hill	II	West Hill			25 March 1986	TQ5373274189; 51°26′45″N 0°12′39″E		1251334	Upload Photo	Q26543305
Former West Hill Police Station	II	West Hill			25 March 1986	TQ5365774176; 51°26′45″N 0°12′35″E		1251333	Upload Photo	Q26543304
Range of Former Dartford Union Workhouse Facing on to West Hill	II	West Hill			25 March 1986	TQ5373674155; 51°26′44″N 0°12′39″E		1251335	Upload Photo	Q26543306
Twistleton's Almshouses	II	6-22, West Hill			25 September 1975	TQ5380974111; 51°26′42″N 0°12′43″E		1086038	Upload Photo	Q26375461
21 and 23, West Hill	II	21 and 23, West Hill			25 September 1975	TQ5382074135; 51°26′43″N 0°12′43″E		1086037	Upload Photo	Q26375456
25, West Hill	II	25, West Hill			25 September 1975	TQ5380974137; 51°26′43″N 0°12′43″E		1336340	Upload Photo	Q26620835
27 and 29, West Hill	II	27 and 29, West Hill			25 September 1975	TQ5380174138; 51°26′43″N 0°12′42″E		1115756	Upload Photo	Q26409448

== See also ==
- Grade I listed buildings in Kent
- Grade II* listed buildings in Kent

== Sources ==
- Newman, John (2012) [1969], Kent: West and the Weald, The Buildings of England, New Haven and London: Yale University Press, ISBN 978-0-300-18509-6
