= Listed buildings in Sutton-at-Hone and Hawley =

Civil Parish in Kent, England

Sutton-at-Hone and Hawley is a village and civil parish in the Borough of Dartford of Kent, England. It contains one grade I, two grade II* and 14 grade II listed buildings that are recorded in the National Heritage List for England.

This list is based on the information retrieved online from Historic England.

== Key ==
Grade	Criteria
I	Buildings that are of exceptional interest
II*	Particularly important buildings of more than special interest
II	Buildings that are of special interest

== Listing ==
Name	Grade	Location	Type	Completed (Note: The date given is the date used by Historic England as significant for the initial building or that of an important part in the structure's description.)	Date designated	Grid ref. (Note: The grid reference is based on the British national grid reference system, sometimes known as OSGB36, used by the Ordnance Survey.) Geo-coordinates	Notes	Entry number (Note: The "List Entry Number" is a unique number assigned to each listed building and scheduled monument by Historic England.)	Image	Wikidata
Garden Walls to West, South and East of No 187 (hill Cottage), and Former Stable	II	Main Road			17 March 1982	TQ5575869607; 51°24′15″N 0°14′16″E		1085778	Upload Photo	Q26374252
Church of St John Church of St John the Baptist	I	Church Road			1 June 1967	TQ5532270598; 51°24′47″N 0°13′56″E		1085811	Church of St John Church of St John the Baptist More images	Q17529675
Monument to John Lethilullier of Sutton Place to North East of Church of St John the Baptist	II	Church Road			17 March 1982	TQ5537170615; 51°24′48″N 0°13′58″E		1100350	Upload Photo	Q26392496
Wall, Gates and Gate Piers Running South East from Corner of Dovecot and Turning North East to North Front of Former Stable	II	Hawley Road, Hawley			17 March 1982	TQ5495972055; 51°25′35″N 0°13′39″E		1100329	Upload Photo	Q26392452
Columbarium at Hawley Manor Dovecote to South West of Hawley Manor	II*	Hawley Road, Hawley			1 August 1952	TQ5488672048; 51°25′35″N 0°13′35″E		1085812	Columbarium at Hawley Manor Dovecote to South West of Hawley Manor More images	Q17557320
Former Stables to South West of Hawley Manor	II	Hawley Road, Hawley			17 March 1982	TQ5493272041; 51°25′34″N 0°13′38″E		1100321	Upload Photo	Q26392434
Hawley Manor	II	Hawley Road, Hawley			21 April 1976	TQ5496072072; 51°25′35″N 0°13′39″E		1336458	Upload Photo	Q26620947
Sutton House	II	Hawley Road, Hawley			17 March 1982	TQ5477872229; 51°25′41″N 0°13′30″E		1336459	Upload Photo	Q26620948
The Old House at Hawley Manor	II	Hawley Road, Hawley			21 April 1976	TQ5495072105; 51°25′36″N 0°13′39″E		1085813	Upload Photo	Q26374391
Wall to North West of the Old House Fronting Road	II	Hawley Road, Hawley			17 March 1982	TQ5495672122; 51°25′37″N 0°13′39″E		1348500	Upload Photo	Q26631876
Bridge to West of St John's Jerusalem	II	Main Road			17 March 1982	TQ5584370342; 51°24′38″N 0°14′22″E		1336473	Upload Photo	Q26620962
Hill Charity Almshouses	II	266-272, Main Road			24 June 1977	TQ5573269647; 51°24′16″N 0°14′15″E		1336460	Upload Photo	Q26620949
Hill Cottgae	II	187, Main Road			2 October 1979	TQ5577769608; 51°24′15″N 0°14′17″E		1085777	Upload Photo	Q26374246
St John's Jerusalem	II*	Main Road			1 August 1952	TQ5588870353; 51°24′39″N 0°14′24″E		1085776	St John's Jerusalem More images	Q7593596
The Hollies	II	66, Main Road			17 March 1982	TQ5561370251; 51°24′36″N 0°14′10″E		1348521	Upload Photo	Q26631897
Wrott Charity Almshouses	II	258-264, Main Road			1 August 1952	TQ5573069664; 51°24′17″N 0°14′15″E		1085814	Wrott Charity Almshouses More images	Q26374397
Garden Wall to Former Sutton Place Fronting Parsonage Lane, Then Turning to North West and Returning South West, Then Turning To North West And Returning South West	II	Parsonage Lane			19 January 1982	TQ5562571001; 51°25′00″N 0°14′12″E		1336474	Upload Photo	Q26620964

== See also ==
- Grade I listed buildings in Kent
- Grade II* listed buildings in Kent

== Sources ==
- Newman, John (2012) [1969], Kent: West and the Weald, The Buildings of England, New Haven and London: Yale University Press, ISBN 978-0-300-18509-6
