= Horton Kirby Boys Home railway station =

Former railway station in Kent, England

Coordinates: 51.40171°N 0.25298°E

Horton Kirby Boys Home

General information
- Location: England
- Grid reference: TQ 56820 69378
- Platforms: 1 (down platform only)

History
- Original company: London, Chatham and Dover Railway
- Pre-grouping: London, Chatham and Dover Railway
- Post-grouping: Southern Railway

Key dates
- 11 October 1870: Opened
- 1930: Closed
- 1939: Demolished
Location

Horton Kirby Boys Home also known as Home for Little Boys was a private railway station opened in 1870 by the London, Chatham and Dover Railway to serve "Home for Little Boys", a cottage homes village in Horton Kirby, which was opened in 1867. It was sited between Farningham Road and Longfield stations on the Chatham Main Line. It only had a 'down' platform (direction Longfield) and there was no 'up' platform. The station closed by 1930 and was demolished in 1939.

Preceding station	Disused railways	Following station
Farningham Road Line and station open	London, Chatham and Dover Railway Chatham Main Line	Longfield Line and station open
