= Dartford Civic Centre =

Municipal building in Dartford, Kent, England

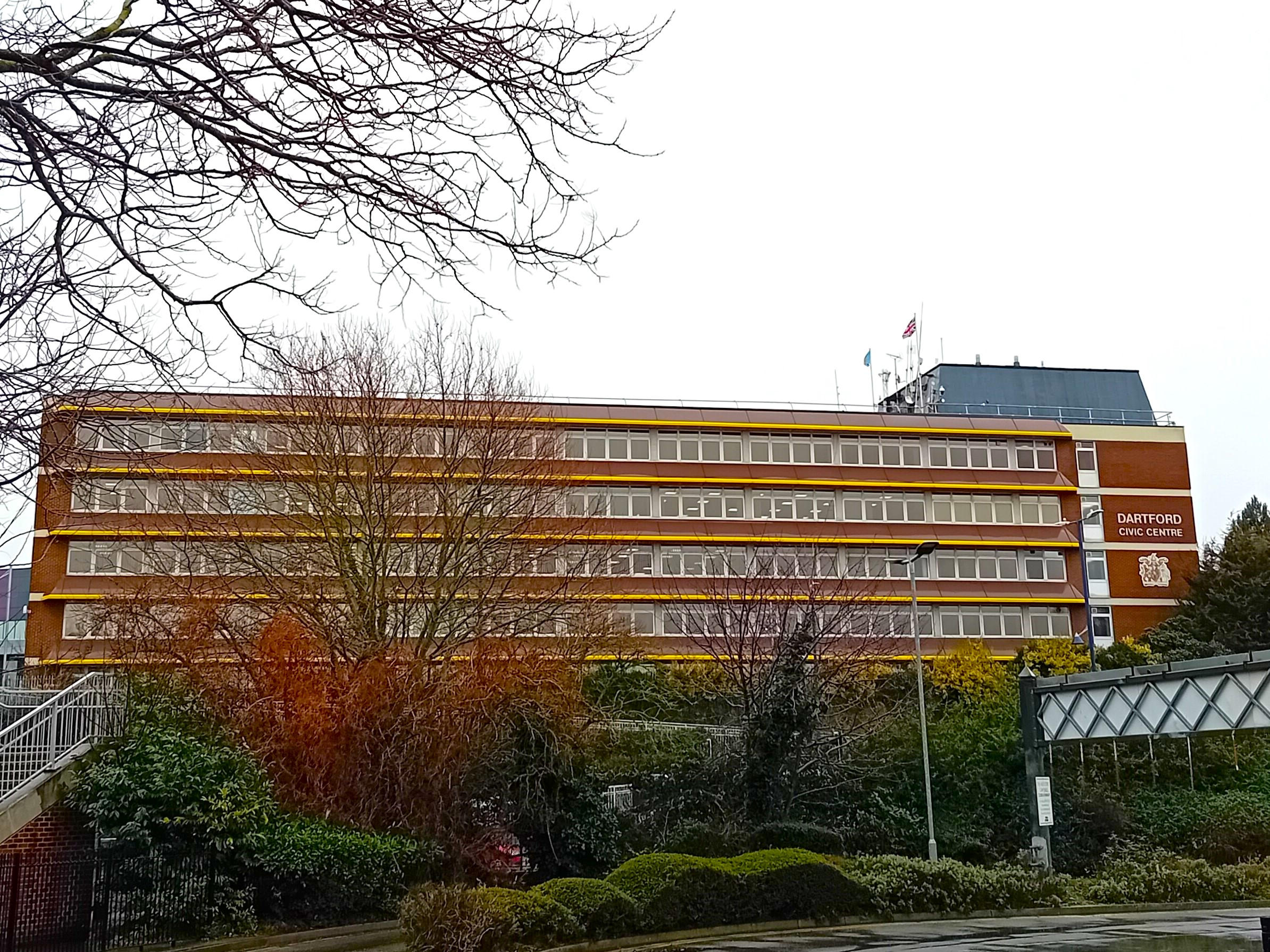
- The building in 2024

- Shown in Kent
- 51.4466°N 0.2192°E
- Location: Home Gardens, Dartford

History
- Built: 1975

Site notes
- Architectural style: Modern style

Dartford Civic Centre is a municipal building in Home Gardens in Dartford, a town in Kent, in England. The building accommodates the offices and meeting place of Dartford Borough Council.

== History ==
Following significant population growth, largely associated with the engineering and paper making industries, a local board was established in Dartford in 1850. After the local board was succeeded by Dartford Urban District Council in 1894, the new council sought accommodation for its offices and meetings. It acquired and converted a large 18th century house at 45 High Street, also known as Bank House or Home House, in 1910. The property at 45 High Street continued to serve as the headquarters of the council after it was incorporated as Dartford Borough Council in 1933.

In the early 1970s, the directors of a major employer in the local area, Hall-Thermotank, decided to commission offices of their own. The site they selected, on the north side of Home Gardens, had previously been used as a coal depot. The new building was designed in the modern style, built in concrete with red brick facings and was completed in 1975. The main frontage of the five-storey building faced onto Home Gardens with an additional wing stretching out to the rear at the east end. The building was faced with alternating bands of red brick and white-framed casement windows. The main entrance, formed by a pair of columns supporting a canopy, was established at the rear of the wing facing Home Gardens. After Hall-Thermotank was acquired by APV in 1976, the building fell vacant and the council moved into the building in 1985. Internally, the principal new room established in the building, following conversion for municipal use, was the council chamber.

In 1991, an emergency centre was added to the building, filling in an area of ground floor car park, over which the original building had been supported on stilts. In 2012, a man was arrested following an armed siege at the building.

Works of art in the building include a portrait of the former chairman of Dartford Urban District Council, Alderman Alfred John Penney, and the former owner of J & E Hall, Everard Hesketh, both painted by May Bridges Lee.
