= Listed buildings in Darenth =

Historic structures in Kent, England

Darenth is a village and civil parish in the Borough of Dartford of Kent, England. It contains one grade I and 13 grade II listed buildings that are recorded in the National Heritage List for England.

This list is based on the information retrieved online from Historic England.

== Key ==
| Grade | Criteria |
|---|---|
| I | Buildings that are of exceptional interest |
| II* | Particularly important buildings of more than special interest |
| II | Buildings that are of special interest |

== Listing ==
| Name | Grade | Location | Type | Completed (Note: The date given is the date used by Historic England as significant for the initial building or that of an important part in the structure's description.) | Date designated | Grid ref. (Note: The grid reference is based on the British national grid reference system, sometimes known as OSGB36, used by the Ordnance Survey.) Geo-coordinates | Notes | Entry number (Note: The "List Entry Number" is a unique number assigned to each listed building and scheduled monument by Historic England.) | Image | Wikidata |
|---|---|---|---|---|---|---|---|---|---|---|
| Church of St Margaret | I | Darenth Hill | | | 1 June 1967 | TQ5608171274; 51°25′08″N 0°14′36″E | | 1085815 | Church of St Margaret More images | Q5117491 |
| Darenth Court House | II | Darenth Hill | | | 17 March 1982 | TQ5614271210; 51°25′06″N 0°14′39″E | | 1336461 | Upload Photo | Q26620950 |
| Icehouse in Grounds of Darenth Grange to South East of House | II | Darenth Hill | | | 17 March 1982 | TQ5628171453; 51°25′14″N 0°14′46″E | | 1085816 | Upload Photo | Q26374403 |
| The Chequers Inn and Ivy Cottage | II | Darenth Hill | | | 17 March 1982 | TQ5584671472; 51°25′15″N 0°14′24″E | | 1336462 | The Chequers Inn and Ivy Cottage More images | Q26620951 |
| Wooden Graveboard in the Churchyard of St Margaret's | II | Darenth Hill | | | 6 July 2009 | TQ5608571296; 51°25′09″N 0°14′36″E | | 1393372 | Upload Photo | Q26672539 |
| Mill House | II | Darenth Road | | | 1 June 1967 | TQ5586671437; 51°25′14″N 0°14′25″E | | 1085817 | Upload Photo | Q26374408 |
| Clock House (flats Nos 1 and 2) | II | Green Street Green Road, Green Street Green | | | 1 August 1952 | TQ5858870686; 51°24′47″N 0°16′45″E | | 1085820 | Upload Photo | Q26374423 |
| Durham House and Durham House Cottage | II | Green Street Green Road, Green Street Green | | | 1 June 1967 | TQ5865170635; 51°24′45″N 0°16′48″E | | 1337674 | Upload Photo | Q26622068 |
| Ice House in Grounds of Clock House Approximately 150 Metres to South West of the House | II | Green Street Green Road, Green Street Green | | | 17 March 1982 | TQ5852270566; 51°24′43″N 0°16′41″E | | 1336464 | Upload Photo | Q17664595 |
| Ryecroft Farmhouse | II | Green Street Green Road, Grubb Street | | | 17 March 1982 | TQ5882069855; 51°24′20″N 0°16′55″E | | 1123709 | Upload Photo | Q26416789 |
| The Forge House | II | Green Street Green Road, Green Street Green | | | 25 February 1981 | TQ5852370728; 51°24′48″N 0°16′41″E | | 1085819 | Upload Photo | Q26374418 |
| Walnut Tree Farmhouse | II | Green Street Green Road, Grubb Street | | | 17 March 1982 | TQ5877370019; 51°24′25″N 0°16′53″E | | 1085821 | Upload Photo | Q26374430 |
| Walnut Tree House | II | Green Street Green Road, Green Street Green | | | 17 March 1982 | TQ5857270798; 51°24′51″N 0°16′44″E | | 1336463 | Upload Photo | Q26620952 |
| Manor House | II | Shellbank Lane, Green Street Green, DA2 8DL | | | 1 June 1967 | TQ5830270943; 51°24′55″N 0°16′30″E | | 1085818 | Upload Photo | Q26374414 |

== See also ==
- Grade I listed buildings in Kent
- Grade II* listed buildings in Kent

== Sources ==
- Newman, John (2012) [1969], Kent: West and the Weald, The Buildings of England, New Haven and London: Yale University Press, ISBN 978-0-300-18509-6
