= Listed buildings in Longfield and New Barn =

Historic structures in Kent, England

Longfield and New Barn is a village and civil parish in the Borough of Dartford of Kent, England. It contains one grade II* and five grade II listed buildings that are recorded in the National Heritage List for England.

This list is based on the information retrieved online from Historic England.

== Key ==
Grade	Criteria
I	Buildings that are of exceptional interest
II*	Particularly important buildings of more than special interest
II	Buildings that are of special interest

== Listing ==
Name	Grade	Location	Type	Completed (Note: The date given is the date used by Historic England as significant for the initial building or that of an important part in the structure's description.)	Date designated	Grid ref. (Note: The grid reference is based on the British national grid reference system, sometimes known as OSGB36, used by the Ordnance Survey.) Geo-coordinates	Notes	Entry number (Note: The "List Entry Number" is a unique number assigned to each listed building and scheduled monument by Historic England.)	Image	Wikidata
Rats Castle	II	Green Street Green Road			22 October 1982	TQ5899469754; 51°24′16″N 0°17′04″E		1239123	Upload Photo	Q26532137
Ivydew Cottage	II	1 and 2, Longfield Hill			22 April 1975	TQ6241468097; 51°23′19″N 0°19′58″E		1273881	Upload Photo	Q26563588
Church of Saint Mary Magdalene	II*	Main Road			1 June 1967	TQ6033469048; 51°23′52″N 0°18′12″E		1239125	Church of Saint Mary Magdalene More images	Q17557348
New Barn House	II	New Barn Road			17 March 1982	TQ6207469044; 51°23′50″N 0°19′42″E		1085798	Upload Photo	Q26374334
Pinden End Farmhouse	II	Pinden Lane			22 October 1982	TQ5905369292; 51°24′01″N 0°17′06″E		1222825	Upload Photo	Q26517124
The Old Farmhouse	II	Pinden Lane, Longfield			22 October 1982	TQ5907769339; 51°24′03″N 0°17′08″E		1239126	Upload Photo	Q26532139

== See also ==
- Grade I listed buildings in Kent
- Grade II* listed buildings in Kent

== Sources ==
- Newman, John (2012) [1969], Kent: West and the Weald, The Buildings of England, New Haven and London: Yale University Press, ISBN 978-0-300-18509-6
