= Listed buildings in Bean, Kent =

Civil Parish in Kent, England

Bean is a village and civil parish in the Borough of Dartford of Kent, England. It contains four grade II listed buildings that are recorded in the National Heritage List for England.

This list is based on the information retrieved online from Historic England.

== Key ==
Grade	Criteria
I	Buildings that are of exceptional interest
II*	Particularly important buildings of more than special interest
II	Buildings that are of special interest

== Listing ==
Name	Grade	Location	Type	Completed (Note: The date given is the date used by Historic England as significant for the initial building or that of an important part in the structure's description.)	Date designated	Grid ref. (Note: The grid reference is based on the British national grid reference system, sometimes known as OSGB36, used by the Ordnance Survey.) Geo-coordinates	Notes	Entry number (Note: The "List Entry Number" is a unique number assigned to each listed building and scheduled monument by Historic England.)	Image	Wikidata
Swanscombe Cutting Footbridge Crossing A2 East of A296 Junction	II	A2			29 May 1998	TQ5986572668; 51°25′50″N 0°17′54″E		1119762	Upload Photo	Q26413055
Barn to South East of Lower Bean Farmhouse	II	Bean Lane			17 March 1982	TQ5850472191; 51°25′36″N 0°16′43″E		1085808	Upload Photo	Q26374380
Lower Bean Farmhouse	II	Bean Lane			17 March 1982	TQ5850172214; 51°25′36″N 0°16′43″E		1099940	Upload Photo	Q26392047
Blue House	II	Sandy Lane			17 March 1982	TQ5968872381; 51°25′41″N 0°17′44″E		1336457	Upload Photo	Q26620946

== See also ==
- Grade I listed buildings in Kent
- Grade II* listed buildings in Kent

== Sources ==
- Newman, John (2012) [1969], Kent: West and the Weald, The Buildings of England, New Haven and London: Yale University Press, ISBN 978-0-300-18509-6
