= Stone Lodge School =

Location
- Cotton Lane; Stone; Kent, DA2 6PD; England

Information
- Type: Free School
- Established: 2019; 7 years ago
- Trust: Endeavour MAT
- Department for Education URN: 147059 Tables
- Ofsted: Reports
- Head Teacher: Catherine Cusick
- Gender: Coeducational
- Age: 11 to 18
- Enrolment: 677 as of September 2023
- Website: www.stonelodgeschool.co.uk

Stone Lodge School is a coeducational secondary school and sixth form located in Stone, Kent, England.

== History ==
The school was established in 2019 by the Endeavour MAT, a multi-academy trust formed by the Wilmington Boys and Girls grammar schools, to address the need for non-selective school places in the Dartford area. The senior management of the school met with Prime Minister Theresa May at 10 Downing Street ahead of the opening.

The first years commencing learning in temporary premises on the site of the finished school. Construction of the permanent facilities commenced in 2021, The new school building was completed and occupied in April 2022. The school sixth form was opened in September 2022.

== Admissions ==
Stone Lodge is a free School with a non-selective admissions policy.

== Curriculum ==
Stone Lodge School offers GCSEs and Level 1 & 2 BTEC Diplomas as programmes of study for pupils, whilst students in the sixth form have the option to study from a range of BTEC Extended Diplomas.
