= 2023 Dartford Borough Council election =

2023 UK local government election

- 4 May 2023

All 42 seats to Dartford Borough Council 22 seats needed for a majority

	First party	Second party	Third party
Leader	Jeremy Kite	Kelly Grehan	Laura Edie (Note: Leading "Alliance Group" of the Green Party and one of the independent councillors.)
Party	Conservative	Labour	Green
Last election	29 seats, 53.1%	10 seats, 29.4%	0 seats, 0.6%
Seats before	31	7	1
Seats won	29	11	1
Seat change	Steady	▲1	▲1
Popular vote	27,404	17,141	2,069
Percentage	55.8%	34.9%	4.2%
Swing	▲3.0%	▲5.1%	▲3.6%
	Fourth party	Fifth party
Party	Swanscombe and Greenhithe Residents' Association	Independent
Last election	3 seats, 5.4%	0 seats, 1.6%
Seats before	1	2
Seats won	1	0
Seat change	▼2	Steady
Popular vote	1,640	117
Percentage	3.3%	0.2%
Swing	▼2.1%	▼1.4%
- Results by ward
Leader before election
Jeremy Kite
Conservative
Leader after election
Jeremy Kite
Conservative

The 2023 Dartford Borough Council election took place on 4 May 2023 to elect all 42 members of Dartford Borough Council in Kent, England.

This election took place alongside other local elections across England.

The council remained under Conservative majority control after the election.

== Changes since 2019 election ==
After Cllr Jonathon Hawkes, leader of the Labour Group, lost his seat in 2019, Cllr Sacha Gosine was elected as the new Leader of the Opposition. He was replaced by Cllr Kelly Grehan in 2022. Between 2019 and 2023, the Labour Group lost 3 councillors. Deputy Leader Cllr Adrian Oakley-Dow resigned from the party following the election of a new Deputy. Around this time, Cllr Romana Gosine was expelled by the party for an alleged "breach of the rules". Cllr Laura Edie left the Labour Party after criticising the national party's policies, and sat as a Green Party councillor for the remainder of her term. She was re-elected as a Green councillor in 2023.

In April 2021, 2 councillors from the Swanscombe and Greenhithe Residents Association, Cllrs Sue Butterfill and Anita Barham, left the party to form a new Independent Party Group. They later joined the Conservative Party. Cllr Barham stood as a Conservative candidate in Swanscombe in 2023, but was not elected.

Cllr Ann Allen died in October 2021, triggering a by-election in Maypole & Leyton Cross. Cllr Lucas Reynolds also stood down for personal reasons, triggering a by-election in Wilmington, Sutton-At-Hone & Hawley. Both seats were held by the Conservatives with large majorities.

In May 2022, it was announced that Cllr Laura Edie and Cllr Peter Harman (of the Swanscombe and Greenhithe Residents Association) had formed the Alliance Group together.

A by-election was also held in February 2023, once again in Wilmington, Sutton-At-Hone & Hawley, where the Conservative majority was increased.

== Summary ==
=== Election result ===
2023 Dartford Borough Council election
Party	Candidates	Seats	Gains	Losses	Net gain/loss	Seats %	Votes %	Votes	+/−
Conservative	42	29	1	1	Steady	69.0	55.8	27,404	+2.7
Labour	42	11	2	1	▲1	26.2	34.9	17,141	+5.5
Green	9	1	1	0	▲1	2.4	4.2	2,069	+3.6
Residents	4	1	0	2	▼2	2.4	3.3	1,640	–2.1
Reform	5	0	0	0	Steady	0.0	1.0	503	N/A
Britain First	2	0	0	0	Steady	0.0	0.3	168	N/A
Independent	1	0	0	0	Steady	0.0	0.2	117	–1.4
Liberal Democrats	1	0	0	0	Steady	0.0	0.1	63	–0.1

== Ward results ==
The Statement of Persons Nominated, which details the candidates standing in each ward, was released by Dartford Borough Council following the close of nominations on 4 April 2023. The results for each ward were as follows:

=== Bean & Village Park ===
Bean & Village Park
Party	Candidate	Votes	%	±%
Conservative	David Hammock*	392	74.5	−7.0
Labour	Graham Windram	134	25.5	+7.0
Majority		258	49.0	
Turnout		526	27.42	
Registered electors		1,933		
Conservative hold		Swing		

=== Brent ===
Brent (2 seats)
Party	Candidate	Votes	%	±%
Conservative	Rosanna Currans*	840	34.1	+1.5
Conservative	Peter Whapshott	718	29.1	−2.5
Labour	Sarah Crook	359	14.6	+4.4
Labour	Marian Benford	355	14.4	+5.8
Green	Claire Edie	130	5.3	N/A
Liberal Democrats	Cullen O'Donnell	63	2.6	N/A
Turnout		1,324	30.33	
Registered electors		4,366		
Conservative hold		Swing		
Conservative hold		Swing		

=== Bridge ===
Bridge
Party	Candidate	Votes	%	±%
Conservative	Clement Quaqumey	316	61.5	−0.8
Labour	Peter Grehan	198	38.5	+16.7
Majority		118	23.0	
Turnout		514	19.93	−5.17
Registered electors		2,584		
Conservative hold		Swing		

=== Burnham ===
Burnham
Party	Candidate	Votes	%	±%
Conservative	Mathew Davis*	358	56.1	+5.1
Labour	Amanda Cook	280	43.9	−5.1
Majority		78	12.2	
Turnout		638	28.94	
Registered electors		2,218		
Conservative hold		Swing		

=== Darenth ===
Darenth
Party	Candidate	Votes	%	±%
Conservative	Paul Denman	215	35.8	−11.6
Labour	Catherine Stafford	207	34.5	+2.9
Independent	Tony Prentice	117	19.5	N/A
Britain First	Nicholas Scanlon	61	10.2	N/A
Majority		8	1.3	
Turnout		600	30.32	
Registered electors		1,999		
Conservative hold		Swing		

=== Ebbsfleet ===
Ebbsfleet (3 seats)
Party	Candidate	Votes	%	±%
Conservative	Danny Nicklen*	615	21.0	+17.5
Labour	Jonathon Hawkes	535	18.2	+8.5
Labour	Victoria Akintomide-Akinwamide	507	17.3	+7.0
Labour	Victoria Oguntope	479	16.3	+6.2
Conservative	Subhash Goswami	406	13.8	+9.9
Conservative	Edith Nwachukwu	392	13.4	+12.7
Turnout		1,112	27.51	
Registered electors		4,042		
Conservative hold		Swing		
Labour hold		Swing		
Labour hold		Swing		

=== Greenhithe & Knockhall ===
Greenhithe & Knockhall (3 seats)
Party	Candidate	Votes	%	±%
Swanscombe and Greenhithe Residents' Association	Peter Harman*	623	19.4	+8.0
Conservative	David Mote*	499	15.5	+2.9
Conservative	Carol Gale	359	11.2	+0.1
Swanscombe and Greenhithe Residents' Association	Dawn Johnston	354	11.0	−14.4
Conservative	Safiul Azam	345	10.7	+0.7
Swanscombe and Greenhithe Residents' Association	Elizabeth Wickham	335	10.4	−5.3
Labour	Lisa Bullock	270	8.4	+5.4
Labour	Joshua Grills	224	7.0	+5.7
Labour	James Ray	205	6.4	+4.2
Turnout		1,204	22.40	
Registered electors		5,374		
Swanscombe and Greenhithe Residents' Association hold		Swing		
Conservative gain from Swanscombe and Greenhithe Residents' Association		Swing		
Conservative hold		Swing		

=== Heath ===
Heath (2 seats)
Party	Candidate	Votes	%	±%
Conservative	Andrew Lloyd*	910	35.9	−0.9
Conservative	Patsy Thurlow*	837	33.0	+1.5
Labour	David Celino-Stock	405	16.0	+4.5
Labour	Sally Wainwright	243	9.6	−6.0
Reform	Michael Brown	141	5.6	N/A
Turnout		1,457	33.10	
Registered electors		4,402		
Conservative hold		Swing		
Conservative hold		Swing		

=== Joyden's Wood ===
Joyden's Wood (2 seats)
Party	Candidate	Votes	%	±%
Conservative	Brian Garden*	1,131	42.0	+6.4
Conservative	Marilyn Peters*	1,067	39.6	+1.8
Labour	Carole Jones	253	9.4	+5.3
Labour	Peter Summers	245	9.1	+7.2
Turnout		1,404	34.28	
Registered electors		4,096		
Conservative hold		Swing		
Conservative hold		Swing		

=== Longfield, New Barn & Southfleet ===
Longfield, New Barn & Southfleet (3 seats)
Party	Candidate	Votes	%	±%
Conservative	Jeremy Kite*	1,431	26.0	+2.5
Conservative	Steven Brown*	1,406	25.6	+4.3
Conservative	Roger Perfitt*	1,317	23.9	+5.0
Labour	Timothy Cook	388	7.1	+6.7
Labour	Lacey Povey	375	6.8	+7.8
Labour	Allan Fisher	327	5.9	+4.5
Green	Alastair Humphreys	256	4.7	N/A
Turnout		1,997	36.36	
Registered electors		5,493		
Conservative hold		Swing		
Conservative hold		Swing		
Conservative hold		Swing		

=== Maypole & Leyton Cross ===
Maypole & Leyton Cross
Party	Candidate	Votes	%	±%
Conservative	Kyle Stealey*	435	68.7	−15.4
Labour	David Brooker	198	31.3	+15.4
Majority		237	37.4	
Turnout		633	29.3	+2.6
Registered electors		2,177		
Conservative hold		Swing		

=== Newtown ===
Newtown (2 seats)
Party	Candidate	Votes	%	±%
Labour	Debbie Graham	528	20.7	−3.2
Green	Laura Edie*	509	20.0	+24.9
Labour	Jonathan Wynne	401	15.7	−9.7
Conservative	Andrew Mensah	399	15.6	−6.6
Conservative	Sheun Oke	365	14.3	−6.8
Green	Julian Hood	348	13.6	N/A
Turnout		1355	33.18	−2.02
Registered electors		4,084		
Labour hold		Swing		
Green gain from Labour		Swing		

=== Princes ===
Princes (2 seats)
Party	Candidate	Votes	%	±%
Labour	Ricky Jones*	490	26.6	+3.8
Labour	Alina Vaduva	395	21.4	+0.2
Conservative	Monjur Showkat	388	21.0	+2.3
Conservative	Rebecca Storey*	386	20.9	−0.8
Green	Ciara O'Hare	76	4.1	N/A
Green	Kerry O'Hare	60	3.3	N/A
Reform	Lou Sparrow	49	2.7	N/A
Turnout		1021	24.73	−6.77
Registered electors		4,129		
Labour hold		Swing		
Labour gain from Conservative		Swing		

=== Stone Castle ===
Stone Castle (3 seats)
Party	Candidate	Votes	%	±%
Conservative	Paul Cutler*	518	21.2	+11.5
Conservative	Lucy Canham*	491	20.1	+2.8
Conservative	John Burrell*	440	18.0	−0.3
Labour	Trevor Donnelly	362	14.8	+4.0
Labour	Pat Kelly	320	13.1	−0.1
Labour	Rachel Gogo	315	12.9	+5.7
Turnout		925	17.10	−7.1
Registered electors		5,410		
Conservative hold		Swing		
Conservative hold		Swing		
Conservative hold		Swing		

=== Stone House ===
Stone House (2 seats)
Party	Candidate	Votes	%	±%
Conservative	Tom Oliver*	667	28.1	+9.7
Labour	Rachael Anne	556	23.4	−2.4
Conservative	Milan Suter	535	22.5	+1.8
Labour	Karl Harris	491	20.7	+1.7
Green	Louise Maclean	125	5.3	N/A
Turnout		1272	27.3	+1.5
Registered electors		4,657		
Conservative hold		Swing		
Labour hold		Swing		

=== Swanscombe ===
Swanscombe (2 seats)
Party	Candidate	Votes	%	±%
Labour	Emma Ben Moussa*	732	34.1	+21.6
Labour	Claire Pearce	476	22.2	+7.7
Conservative	Anita Barham*	379	17.7	−6.4
Swanscombe and Greenhithe Residents' Association	Lorna Cross	328	15.3	−10.7
Conservative	Santosh Patil	125	5.8	+1.0
Britain First	Paul Golding	107	5.0	N/A
Turnout		1,197	25.67	
Registered electors		4,663		
Labour hold		Swing		
Labour gain from Swanscombe and Greenhithe Residents' Association		Swing		

=== Temple Hill ===
Temple Hill (3 seats)
Party	Candidate	Votes	%	±%
Labour	Kelly Grehan*	796	22.9	+19.1
Labour	Alina Gaskin*	737	21.2	+15.6
Labour	Darren Povey	704	20.3	+15.0
Conservative	Thomas Denman	393	11.3	+3.8
Conservative	Thomas Shippam	327	9.4	+0.6
Conservative	Ganesh Malyala	322	9.3	+0.9
Reform	Barry Taylor	102	2.9	−17.4
Reform	Enrique Martin-Garcia	93	2.7	−16.7
Turnout		1,281	21.14	
Registered electors		6,059		
Labour hold		Swing		
Labour hold		Swing		
Labour hold		Swing		

=== Town ===
Town (2 seats)
Party	Candidate	Votes	%	±%
Conservative	Christopher Shippam*	544	32.5	+9.4
Conservative	Richard Wells*	530	31.6	+10.0
Labour	Justina Lambert	309	18.4	−1.9
Labour	Jiri Marek	292	17.4	−2.4
Turnout		872	23.83	
Registered electors		3,660		
Conservative hold		Swing		
Conservative hold		Swing		

=== West Hill ===
West Hill (3 seats)
Party	Candidate	Votes	%	±%
Conservative	Julie Ozog*	1,096	20.6	+4.8
Conservative	Denzil Reynolds*	1,062	20.0	+4.9
Conservative	Drew Swinerd*	969	18.2	+3.1
Labour	Robert Celino-Stock	632	11.9	+0.7
Labour	Suyi Michelli	600	11.3	+0.3
Labour	Sandra Woodeson	580	10.9	±0.0
Green	Garry Turner	374	7.0	N/A
Turnout		1,923	33.04	
Registered electors		5,821		
Conservative hold		Swing		
Conservative hold		Swing		
Conservative hold		Swing		

=== Wilmington, Sutton-at-Hone & Hawley ===
Wilmington, Sutton-at-Hone & Hawley (3 seats)
Party	Candidate	Votes	%	±%
Conservative	George Holt*	1,270	25.3	+8.2
Conservative	Eddy Lampkin*	1,162	23.1	+6.1
Conservative	Av Sandhu	1,047	20.8	+4.5
Labour	Abigail Jones	449	8.9	+8.2
Labour	Raymond Kelleher	414	8.2	+5.7
Labour	Geoffrey Prout	375	7.5	+5.3
Green	Richard Moore	191	3.8	N/A
Reform	Marc Mason	118	2.3	N/A
Turnout		1,860	30.54	
Registered electors		6,091		
Conservative hold		Swing		
Conservative hold		Swing		
Conservative hold		Swing		

== Changes 2023–2027 ==
- August 2024: Following his suspension from the Labour Party, Ricky Jones, elected as a Labour councillor for Princes, sat as an ungrouped councillor.
- October 2025: James Buchan, elected as a Reform UK councillor for Stone House in July 2025, joined the Conservative Party.
- By 2026: Laura Edie, elected as a Green councillor for Newtown in 2023, was sitting as an independent councillor.

=== Greenhithe & Knockhall ===
Greenhithe and Knockhall by-election: 21 November 2024
Party	Candidate	Votes	%	±%
Reform	Michael Brown	284	31.2	N/A
Swanscombe and Greenhithe Residents' Association	Dawn Johnston	251	27.6	–17.2
Green	Sacha Gosine	150	16.5	N/A
Labour	Peter Summers	113	12.4	–7.0
Conservative	Edith Nwachukwu	112	12.3	–23.5
Majority		33	3.6	N/A
Turnout		914	16.1	–6.3
Registered electors		5,662		
Reform gain from Swanscombe and Greenhithe Residents' Association				

The by-election was held following the death of Swanscombe and Greenhithe Residents' Association councillor Peter Harman.

=== Maypole & Leyton Cross ===
Maypole & Leyton Cross by-election: 17 July 2025
Party	Candidate	Votes	%	±%
Reform	Stephen Ridley	303	53.8	N/A
Conservative	Steven Campbell	158	28.1	–40.6
Labour	David Johnson-Lang	71	12.6	–18.6
Green	Lewis Glynn	31	5.5	N/A
Majority		145	25.7	N/A
Turnout		563	24.9	–4.4
Registered electors		2,257		
Reform gain from Conservative				

The by-election was triggered by the resignation of Conservative councillor Kyle Stealey.

=== Stone House ===
Stone House by-election: 17 July 2025
Party	Candidate	Votes	%	±%
Reform	James Buchan	475	45.2	N/A
Labour	Suneetha Giridhar	299	28.5	–12.8
Conservative	Milan Suter	190	18.1	–31.4
Green	Julian Hood	87	8.3	–1.0
Majority		176	16.7	N/A
Turnout		1,051	22.2	–5.1
Registered electors		4,728		
Reform gain from Conservative				

The by-election was triggered by the resignation of Conservative councillor Thomas Oliver.
