= Longfield railway station =

Railway station in Kent, England

Coordinates: 51°23′45.87″N 0°18′1.76″E

Longfield
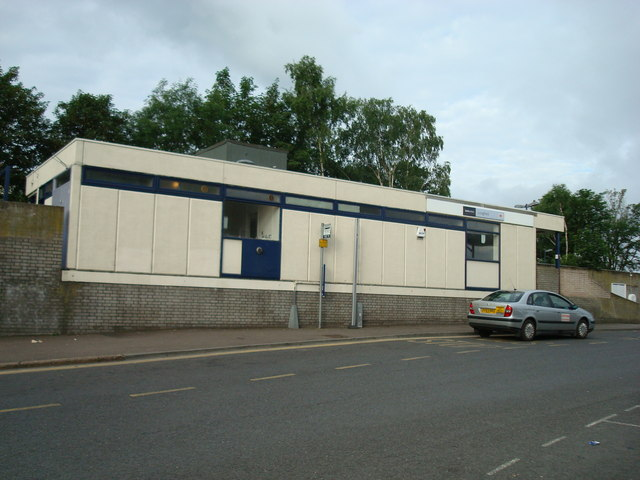

General information
- Location: Longfield, Borough of Dartford; England
- Grid reference: TQ601688
- Managed by: Southeastern
- Platforms: 2

Other information
- Station code: LGF
- Classification: DfT category D

History
- Opened: June 1872

Passengers
- 2020/21: ▼0.118 million
- 2021/22: ▲0.314 million
- 2022/23: ▲0.370 million
- 2023/24: ▲0.411 million
- 2024/25: ▲0.439 million
Location
Notes
- Passenger statistics from the Office of Rail and Road

Longfield railway station is on the Chatham Main Line in England, serving the villages of Longfield, Hartley, and New Ash Green. It is 23 miles 30 chains (37.6 km) down the line from London Victoria and is situated between Farningham Road and Meopham.

The station and all trains that call are operated by Southeastern.

== History ==
Although situated in Longfield, the station was originally named after Fawkham when it opened in June 1872. The name of a nearby village was chosen as a local land owner had offered land and cash for provision of a station.

The original station was destroyed by fire around 1900, but rebuilt in the same location. The railway line through Fawkham station was electrified in 1939 under the Southern Railway with electric trains operating between Victoria and Gillingham. Steam trains continued to pass through the station on their way to/from the Kent Coast until June 1959 when those services were then also turned over to electric operation under British Railways.

With the start of summer timetable in 1961, the true location of the station was recognised when it was renamed 'Longfield for Fawkham & Hartley' from 12 June. By the end of the 1960s the cumbersome appendences were dropped in favour of plain Longfield, although the longer name survived on some signs and tickets well into the next decade.

The station building built following the fire of 1900 was demolished in 1971 and replaced by the contemporary CLASP prefabricated design favoured by British Rail.

Usage of the station has grown considerably in the last thirty years, as it rests within a large catchment area of residential development. The frequency of services and journey times to and from London also attracts commuters away from the slower North Kent Line services provided at Gravesend, Northfleet and Swanscombe stations.

== Services ==
All services at Longfield are operated by Southeastern using Class 375, 377, 465 and 466 EMUs.

The typical off-peak service in trains per hour is:

- 2 tph to London Victoria (1 of these runs non-stop from Bromley South and 1 calls at Denmark Hill)
- 1 tph to Gillingham
- 1 tph to Dover Priory via Canterbury East

During the peak hours, the station is served by an additional hourly service between London Victoria and Gillingham. The station is also served by a number of peak hour services to and from Ramsgate.

On Sundays, the station is served by an hourly service between Dover Priory and London Victoria via Denmark Hill.

Preceding station	National Rail	Following station
Farningham Road or Bromley South	Southeastern Chatham Main Line	Meopham
	Historical railways	
Horton Kirby Boys Home Line open, station closed	London, Chatham and Dover Railway Chatham Main Line	Meopham Line and station open
