= Darenth =

Village in Kent, England

Coordinates: 51.4199°N 0.2567°E

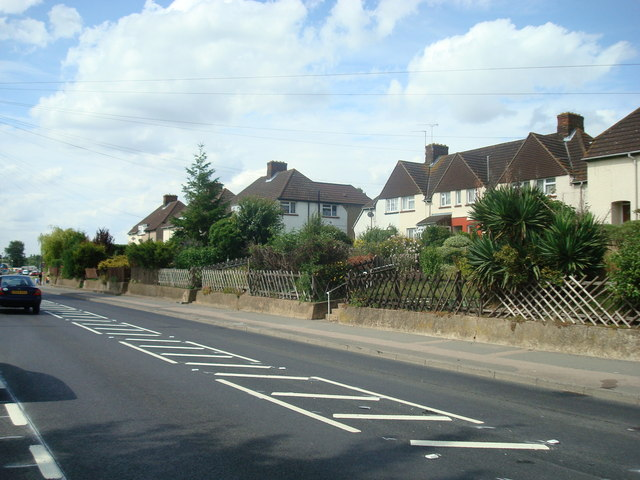
- A street view of Darenth

- Location within Kent
- Population: 4,851 (2011 Census)
- District: Dartford
- Shire county: Kent
- Region: South East
- Country: England
- Sovereign state: United Kingdom
- Post town: Dartford
- Postcode district: DA2
- Police: Kent
- Fire: Kent
- Ambulance: South East Coast
- UK Parliament: Dartford

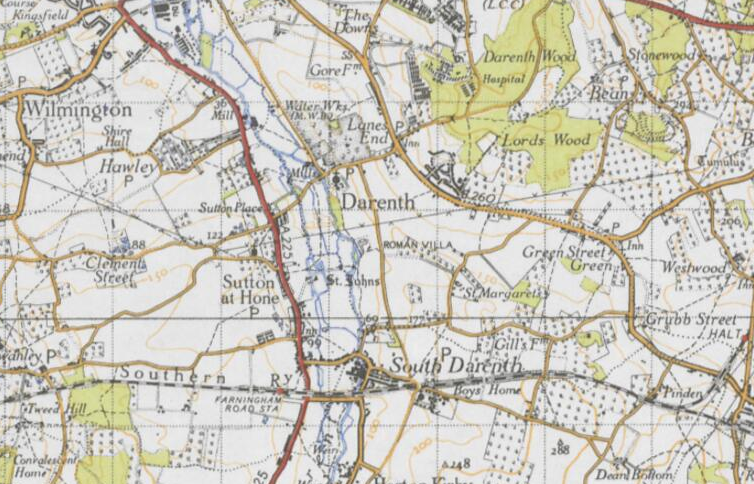
20th Century map of Darenth

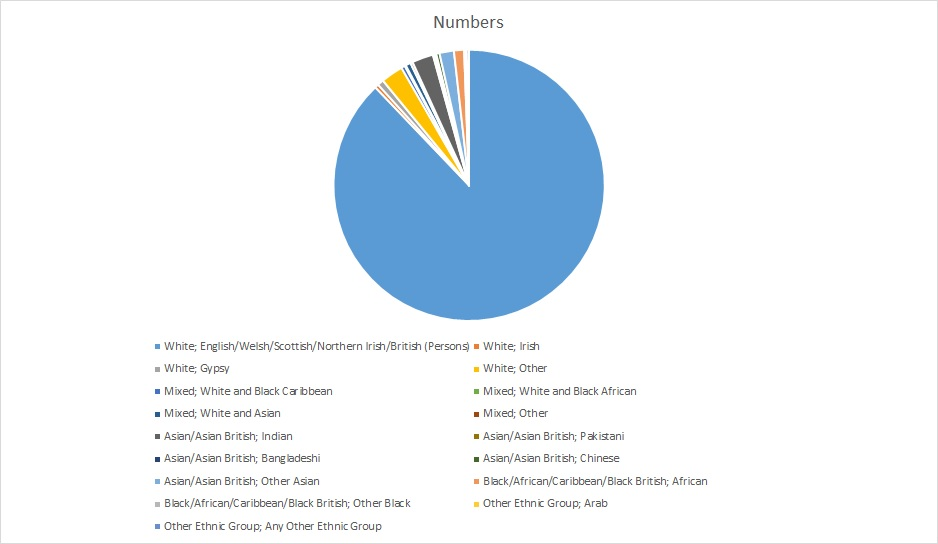
Ethnic groups in Darenth

Darenth is a village and civil parish in the Borough of Dartford, Kent, England. It is located 3.4 miles south east of Dartford and 4.6 miles north east of Swanley.

== History ==
The parish was part of Axstane Hundred and later Dartford Rural District. In the 1870s, Darenth was described as "a parish in Dartford district, Kent; on the river Darent, 1½ mile N of Farningham r. station, and 2¼ SSE of Dartford".

== Demographics ==
According to the 2011 Census, there were 2,398 males and 2,453 females living in the parish.

The population in Darenth remains stable, up until 1850. After this point, the population increases gradually, up until 1911, where the population dramatically increases. The boundary for Darenth changed on 1 April 1955, thus explaining the minor fluctuation, the population then went on to reach its peak in 1960, with a total population of 5,127. After this point, the population has steadily declined, with the total population (from the 2011 Census), to be recorded at 4,851. According to the 2011 Census, the most dominant age sector was the 45 - 59 year olds, accounting for a quarter of the population in Darenth. The biggest population increase in Darenth has occurred in the 30 - 44 year old age sector, going from 325 people (according to the 2001 Census), to 1031 people, merely 10 years later. This also correlates with the population graph as there is a steady increase from 2001 to 2011. Over the 10-year period (2001 - 2011) Darenth has encountered a slight decrease in young dependants, with a decline of 9%, thus fewer people are having babies. The decline in young dependants and the increase in the economically active, has changed Darenth's demography, resulting in a population imbalance between the youth, the elderly and the economically active.

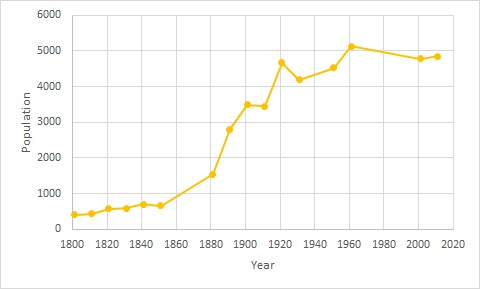

=== Ethnicity ===
Darenth has a total of 17 different Ethnic groups, however the majority remain white, with a total of 4,158 white people. The dominant minority are the British Asian grouping, with a total of 140 people, the smallest ethnic grouping are the Mixed White and Black African grouping, with as little as 7 people, however as a whole, the Mixed grouping has a total of 51 people, which is not the smallest overall. The smallest grouping overall are the Arabs, with a total population making up as little as 8 people.

=== Religion ===
The dominant religion in Darenth is Christianity, making up 62% of the total population, on the contrary, 27% of the population identify as Atheists, and as a result Atheists are the second most common grouping. The minority religious groups in Darenth are the Jewish, Buddhist, Sikh, Muslim and Hindu populations, making up as little as 0.04% (Jewish), 0.4% (Buddhists), 1% (Sikhs), 1.4% (Muslim) and 2% (Hindu). The religious groupings directly correlate to the ethnic groupings, for example, the dominant religions correlate with the dominant ethnicities, this pattern is also similar with the minority religions and the minority ethnicities.

== Occupation Structure Through Time ==
Data in early Census reports, often got mixed up, causing multiple issues with social status due to the confusion of people's occupation, as well as who owned certain business'. In 1831, a much more detailed categorisation was published on occupations, and as a result, this Census has been the most detailed parish-occupational data to be published from the Census. After 1841 multiple occupations were used to provide data for detailed tables, contributing to over 3,000 different occupations, however by 1881, job titles had been re-organised and sub-categorised into a total of 414 job titles.

=== Occupation in 1881 ===
The occupation structure of Darenth in 1881, represents a clear divide of male and female work, the dominant structure for males is the Agricultural sector, in comparison to the females where Domestic services were dominant. Agriculture is the most common sector for males because it requires low-skilled and manual labour, this is also a reflection of the area it is in. Occupation structure is limited within the female community, often, females did not have paid work or the work was informal, thus explaining the 344 women whose occupation was either unknown or unemployed. The largest formal work undertaken by females was within domestic services, employing 115 women. Domestic services were most common within the female occupation structure, because jobs which females were allowed to do were limited, and as a result of this, domestic services were found to be the easiest within the female population because females were taught domestic skills form a young age.

=== Occupation Structure in 2011 ===
From the 2011 Census, Darenth's occupation structure has completely shifted. Today a total of 2,449 men and women between the ages of 16-74 are in employment, compared to 1881, where the total came to 844. A lot of industries and business' that were dominant in 1881, such as agricultural work and dealerships, no longer provide jobs for the economically active in Darenth, agricultural work has been overthrown by the secondary, tertiary and quaternary sectors. Today, all occupations revolve around a tertiary and quaternary sector, with a dominance within Professional, Administrative and Secretarial occupations. The most dominant group is Professional occupations, with a total of 381 people employed in this sector, making up 16% of Darenth's occupation structure in 2011. The least common occupation revolves around the secondary sector, with 194 employed within plant, process and machine operatives. The occupation structure no longer revolves around a primary sector, this is because people are educated and thus have a higher skill set that is required for primary jobs. As a result of this, the occupation structure has shifted to secondary, tertiary and quaternary sectors, obviously, there are more opportunities in Darenth which people have taken advantage of, thus enabling a more service-based community.

== Transport ==
=== Rail ===
The nearest National Rail station is Farningham Road, located 1.6 miles away.

=== Buses ===
Darenth is served by Brookline Coaches route 479, providing connections to Bluewater, Longfield and New Ash Green.

== See also ==
- Listed buildings in Darenth
