= Farningham Road railway station =

Railway station in Kent, England

Farningham Road
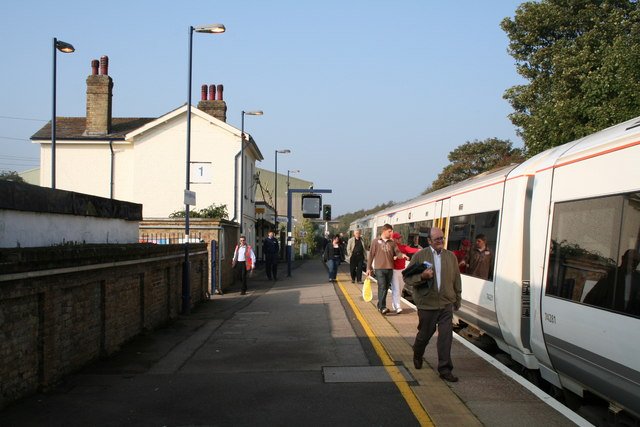
- Viewed from the west

General information
- Location: Sutton-at-Hone, Borough of Dartford; England
- Coordinates: 51.401575°N 0.236222°E
- Grid reference: TQ556693
- Manager: Southeastern
- Platforms: 2

Other information
- Station code: FNR
- Classification: DfT category E

Key dates
- 3 December 1860: Opened

Passengers
- 2020/21: ▼38,932
- 2021/22: ▲0.104 million
- 2022/23: ▲0.119 million
- 2023/24: ▲0.128 million
- 2024/25: ▲0.132 million
Location
Notes
- Passenger statistics from the Office of Rail and Road

Farningham Road railway station is on the Chatham Main Line in England, serving the villages of Farningham, Sutton-at-Hone, Horton Kirby and South Darenth, Kent. It is 20 miles 41 chains (33.0 km) down the line from London Victoria and is situated between Swanley and Longfield.

The station and all trains that call are operated by Southeastern.

The ticket office, on the 'up' (London-bound) side, is situated in the substantial station building. This is staffed only during part of the day; at other times a self service ticket machine can be used, located on the platform side of the station building.

The railway line was electrified as part of the Southern Railway's "Maidstone & Gillingham Electrification" scheme of July 1939. The station was previously named Farningham Road & Sutton-at-Hone.

== Services ==
All services at Farningham Road are operated by Southeastern using Class 375, 377, 465 and 466 EMUs.

The typical off-peak service in trains per hour is:

- 1 tph to London Victoria via Denmark Hill
- 1 tph to Gillingham

During the peak hours, the station is served by an additional hourly service between London Victoria and Gillingham, increasing the service to 2 tph in each direction.

On Sundays, the service to Gillingham is extended to and from Dover Priory.

Preceding station	National Rail	Following station
Swanley	Southeastern Chatham Main Line	Longfield
	Historical railways	
Swanley Line and station open	London, Chatham and Dover Railway Chatham Main Line	Horton Kirby Boys Home Line open, station closed
Terminus	British Rail; Southern Region Gravesend West Line	Longfield Halt
