= Stone, Kent =

Village in Kent, England

Coordinates: 51.445°N 0.256°E

Stone
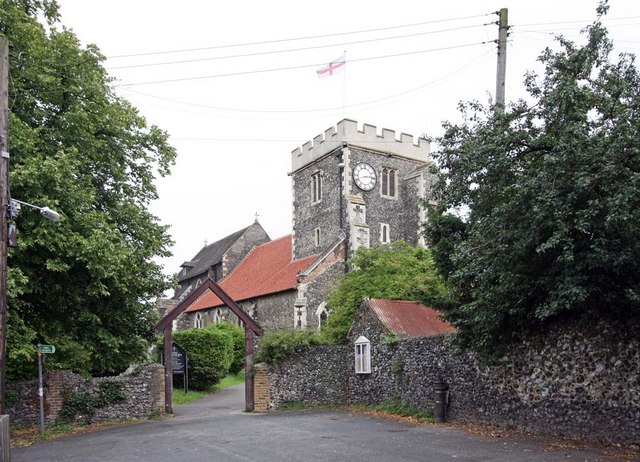
- Stone, Kent, is home to St Mary's, a 13th-century historic Gothic church.

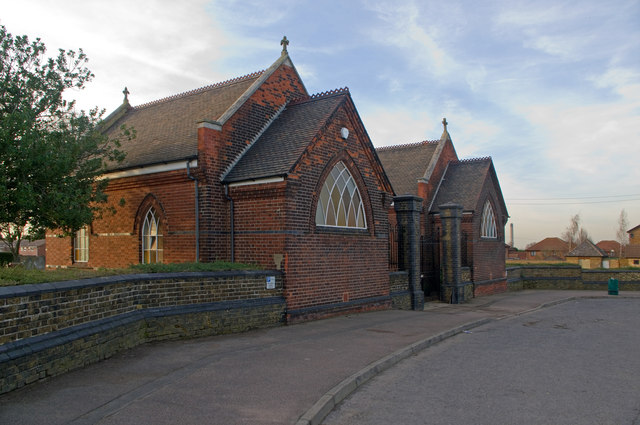
- Stone, Kent, features red-brick chapels flanking the main entrance of its 1899 cemetery.

- Location within Kent
- Population: 6,100 (2005); 10,778 (2011)
- OS grid reference: TQ575745
- Civil parish: Stone
- District: Dartford
- Shire county: Kent
- Region: South East
- Country: England
- Sovereign state: United Kingdom
- Post town: Dartford
- Postcode district: DA2
- Post town: Greenhithe
- Postcode district: DA9
- Dialling code: 01322
- Police: Kent
- Fire: Kent
- Ambulance: South East Coast
- UK Parliament: Dartford
- Website: Official website

Stone, also known as Stone-next-Dartford, is a village and civil parish in the Borough of Dartford in Kent, England, about 3 km east of Dartford and 27 kilometres from central London. It lies on the south bank of the River Thames. The A226 (London Road) runs through Stone, linking Dartford with Greenhithe and Gravesend; the A2 (Roman Watling Street) and M25 motorway pass just north of the parish. The area of Stone includes part of the Bluewater Shopping Centre. The parish population was 10,778 in the 2011 census, rising to about 12,890 by 2021.

== History ==
Stone has evidence of a very early settlement. Numerous Palaeolithic flint tools and handaxes have been found in the parish (for example at Crossways Business Park), reflecting human activity up to one million years ago. In nearby Swanscombe (just east of Stone) pieces of a 400,000-year-old human skull were discovered along with Acheulean (handaxe) tools – some of the earliest human remains in Europe. Later prehistory is also well-attested: Mesolithic and Neolithic worked flints have been recovered across the parish, including an unusual Middle Neolithic pit at Stone allotments . Bronze Age features (such as ring-ditches) and Iron Age settlement sites (at Louvain Road, Stone Castle Quarry and Waterstone Park) have been recorded within Stone.

During the Roman period, the main Roman road from London to Canterbury (Watling Street) formed Stone's southern boundary. Archaeologists have found traces of Roman occupation in Stone: settlements and cemeteries at Stone Castle Quarry, Stone Court Pit and Cotton Lane; as well as Roman pottery and coins throughout the parish. After the Roman era, early medieval remains include a system of tide banks on the Dartford Marshes (the "Littlebrook Walls", mentioned in a charter of AD 995) and an Anglo-Saxon burial at Littlebrook Farm. No continuous village appears to have existed through the Dark Ages, but the area remained farmland under the control of church estates.

Stone appears in the Domesday Book of 1086 as "Estanes", held by the Bishop of Rochester. The entry notes a church and a mill, 72 acres (29 ha) of meadow and woodland for pig grazing, indicating a small medieval manor economy. The parish church of St Mary (on London Road) was built in the 13th–15th century and is now Grade I listed. Stone Castle, a fortified manor house, was originally erected in the reign of King John (1199–1216) and later modified. The surviving south-east tower (flanked by arrow-loops) is medieval, while an adjoining 19th-century house was added by architect Henry Hakewill. (Stone Castle is Grade II listed and today serves as offices.)

In the 18th and 19th centuries Stone remained largely rural. But from about 1850 the cement industry transformed part of the parish: several cement works (later part of Blue Circle/Lafarge) were established on the marshes beside the Thames, exploiting local chalk. These works introduced tramways, storage ponds and riverside wharves (some of which still survive as derelict industrial relics). A brickworks and limekilns also operated in the Victorian era. The railway arrived in 1908 (Stone Crossing station) and the village grew slowly with suburban development.

After World War II Stone expanded further, and its economy shifted to services and retail. The most dramatic change came in 1999 with the opening of Bluewater Shopping Centre on the site of the Western Quarry between Stone and Swanscombe. Bluewater is one of the UK's largest shopping centres (over 330 shops on 1.6 million ft²) and draws about 28 million visitors a year. In 2025 it was announced that Next would triple its store at Bluewater (moving into the former House of Fraser space), illustrating continued development. Today, Stone combines its historic village core with modern retail and business park areas.

== Governance ==
Stone is governed locally by Stone Parish Council. In 2022 Dartford Borough Council formally adopted the Stone Neighbourhood Plan, which guides local development. For borough elections, Stone parish is split between two Dartford wards: Stone Castle and Stone House. Stone Castle ward elects three councillors and covers the north-central part of the parish; Stone House ward elects two councillors for the south-east of Stone. Historically Stone was in the Lathe of Sutton-at-Hone and Longfield Rural District, then part of Dartford Rural District, before the 1974 reorganisation. The village is in the Dartford parliamentary constituency.

== Geography and environment ==
The parish of Stone covers roughly 2,700 acres (1,100 ha). Topographically it is a series of chalk and gravel hills rising from the Thames floodplain. To the north lie marshy former river meadows (Dartford and Stone Marshes), and to the south and west wooded chalk slopes. Historic descriptions note Stone's gravelly soil and extensive chalk pits: indeed, from the village one can look over the marshes to the Thames, and in earlier times chalk was quarried on the riverside and shipped from wharves. Broad leaf woodlands once covered much of the higher ground toward Greenstreet Green and beyond, and remnants of ancient copses remain (e.g. Horns Cross Wood). The River Darent forms most of the parish western boundary.

Large parts of the north of Stone are now occupied by Bluewater and related development. In the eastern parish, Stone Pit 1 is a 40.9-hectare former chalk quarry and landfill (at Cotton Lane) which is being restored into public green space with ecological enhancements. In recognition of Stone’s rich heritage, Kent County Council notes that the parish has important prehistoric, Roman, medieval and industrial archaeological resources. Some open countryside survives around Darenth and Hesketh Parks (to the west) and in fragments of riverine meadow, which support birds and wetland plants. The Swanscombe Peninsula SSSI lies immediately east of Stone (in Swanscombe), preserving riverside fenland habitat.

== Economy ==
Stone’s economy today is dominated by retail and service industries, centered on Bluewater Shopping Centre. Bluewater (opened 1999) has over 330 shops and major leisure facilities; it employs thousands of people and attracts visitors from across the Southeast. The centre has continued to expand – for example, Next will enlarge its presence there in 2026. Smaller retail and restaurant units lie in the village (on London Road) and adjacent areas (e.g. industrial estates). Many Stone residents commute to jobs in nearby Dartford, the Thames Gateway, London, and beyond, taking advantage of the village's transport links. Local employment also includes education, healthcare (Darent Valley Hospital is nearby) and council services.

Historically, 19th-century cement manufacture was the main industry: companies such as Carter’s and later Blue Circle built kilns and lime works on the marshes by the Thames. Although these plants have closed, the industrial heritage remains visible. For instance, Stone Castle was once owned by Blue Circle (as offices). Agricultural use survives on the outskirts of the parish (farmland and grazing). In the 21st century, redevelopment of former industrial sites (like Bluewater and Stone Pit 1) has transformed the local economy towards recreation, retail, housing and high-tech business parks (e.g. Crossways Business Park on Galleon Boulevard).

== Landmarks and notable buildings ==
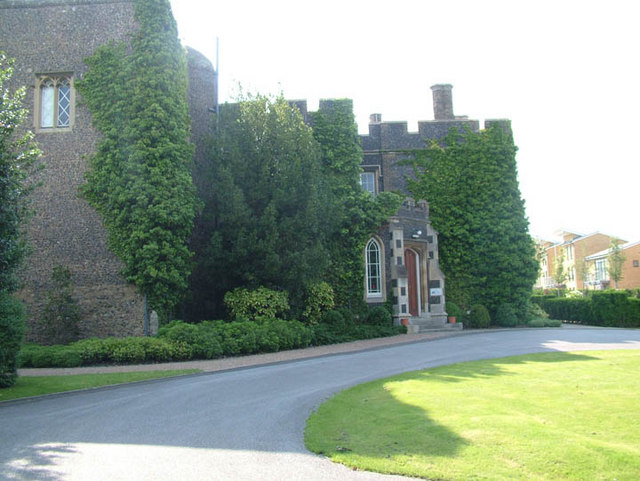
Stone Castle on 9 June 2008

- St Mary's Church (London Road) is a medieval parish church listed as Grade I. The nave and chancel date from the late 13th century (Early English style) with a rib-vaulted chancel, and the west tower is early 14th century. The north aisle contains remnants of 13th-century wall paintings, and the church's interior includes several notable memorials, such as the brass of John Lambarde (d.1408) and a tomb-chest of Sir John Wiltshire (d. 1527). The church sits by the old village green and remains the historic focal point of Stone.
- Stone War Memorial, located at the north end of the recreation ground on London Road, commemorates local men lost in the First and Second World Wars. It bears inscriptions to the fallen of 1914–1918 and 1939–1945 and was erected after World War I.
- Stone Castle (London Road) is a 19th-century castellated manor house incorporating a medieval tower, listed as Grade II. The three-storey southeast tower is medieval (probably late 12th century), faced with knapped flints and pierced by narrow arrow-slits. The rest of the building was largely added circa 1825 in a Gothic Revival style, featuring flint-faced walls with castellations, Tudor arches, and ogee-headed windows. The site now houses offices for the Blue Circle cement group.
- Stone contains several other listed buildings. Elm Hall (in Horns Cross) is a Grade II listed late-17th-century timber-framed house on a moated site. Littlebrook Manor House (Green Street Green Road) is an early-19th-century listed farmhouse. 7–9 New Barn Cottages (London Road) are 17th-century timbered cottages. Many traditional Kentish weatherboarded cottages survive in and around the village green. The village war memorial (1919) stands by the recreation ground, and the Parish Pavilion (built in the 1960s) houses the council office and sports facilities.
- Within the parish but outside the old village core is Bluewater, a modern complex of shops, cinemas, and leisure attractions. While not "historic," Bluewater's contemporary architecture, designed by Benoy Architects, is a local landmark by the lakes. At the eastern edge of Stone lies the Darent Valley Path along the river, appreciated for its scenic views and industrial archaeology, including old kilns by the river.
- The disused John's Hole Quarry at Stone was used as a filming location for the mine scenes in the Doctor Who television story The Dalek Invasion of Earth. It was the first of many quarries to be used in the series.

== Transport ==
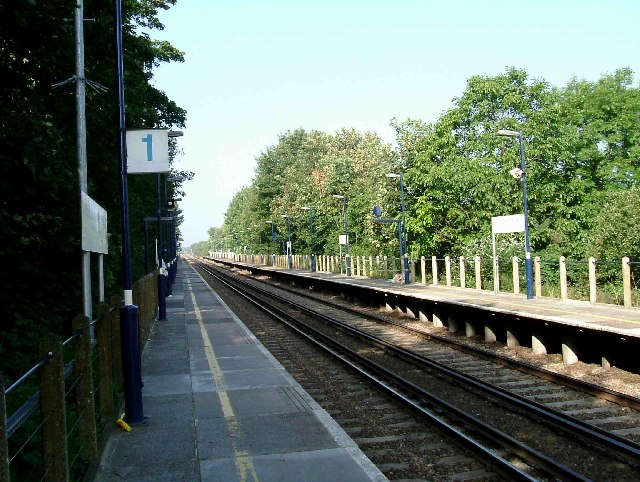
Stone Crossing railway station (Platform 1), photographed 4 September 2005.

=== Rail ===
Stone Crossing railway station (on London Road) is the local National Rail station, opened in 1908. It lies on the North Kent Line, with Southeastern trains providing direct services to central London (London Cannon Street, London Charing Cross, London St Pancras via Woolwich and Stratford) and to Kent destinations (Gravesend, Gillingham and beyond). Frequent peak-hour and off-peak services connect Stone with Dartford, London Bridge and Ebbsfleet.

=== Vehicles (and buses) ===
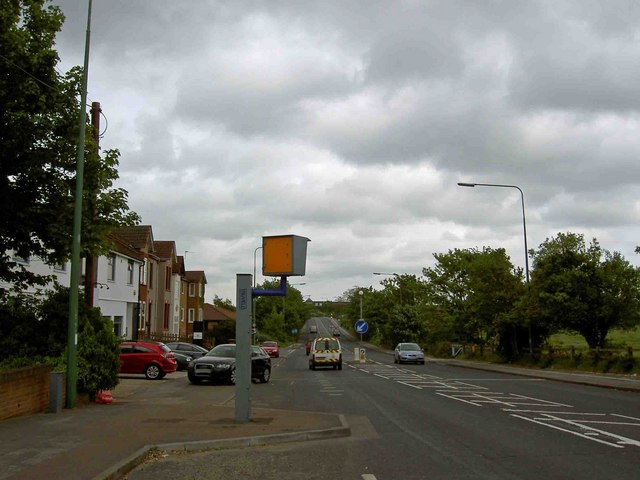
London Road within Stone, photographed 7 May 2009.

By road, London Road/A226 runs through the village, providing frequent bus services. Transport for London route 492 (operated by Arriva London) connects Stone with Sidcup and Bluewater, while Arriva Kent Thameside routes (such as 480 to Gravesend) and Ensign bus X80 (Bluewater–Lakeside–Chafford Hundred) serve local stops. The A2 motorway passes to the north (reachable via Darenth or Crossways), linking to the M25 (Dartford Crossing) and to central London and Kent. Travel by car or coach to Dartford town centre (for links to the A20 and A2) is quick via the A226 and A296.

== Education and sport ==
Stone is served by state schools. The Brent Primary School (London Road, Stone) is a coeducational primary academy (ages 4–11) in the Cygnus Academies Trust. It opened as an academy in 2014 and by 2025 had about 642 pupils (capacity 654).

For secondary education, Stone Lodge School opened on 2 September 2019 as a new mixed secondary school and sixth form (ages 11–19) on the north side of the village. Stone Lodge (Endeavour MAT academy) has a published capacity of 1,450; as of 2024 it enrolled about 933 students. The school was formed by amalgamating local grammar and upper schools. The nearest Kent grammar school is Wilmington Grammar School for Boys (in Wilmington, a mile to the southwest). Stone lies in the catchment of Wilmington Grammar for Girls and several primary schools in Dartford and Wilmington.

Stone has a village cricket team that was established in 1888.

== Demography ==
Stone compared
2001 UK Census	Stone	Dartford District	England
Total population	6,252	85,911	49,138,831
Foreign-born	5.2%	5.8%	9.2%
White	95.9%	94.5%	90.9%
Asian	1.6%	3.2%	4.6%
Black	1.3%	0.9%	2.3%
Christian	71%	73.3%	72%
Muslim	0.3%	0.7%	3.1%
Hindu	0.4%	0.8%	1.1%
No religion	17.4%	15.1%	15%
Unemployed	3.1%	2.5%	3.3%

At the 2001 UK census, the Stone electoral ward had a population of 6,252.

The ethnicity was 95.9% white, 0.9% mixed race, 1.6% Asian, 1.3% black and 0.3% other. The place of birth of residents was 94.8% United Kingdom, 0.8% Republic of Ireland, 0.9% other Western European countries, and 3.5% elsewhere. Religion was recorded as 71% Christian, 0.2% Buddhist, 0.4% Hindu, 0.5% Sikh and 0.3% Muslim. 17.4% were recorded as having no religion, 0.2% had an alternative religion and 9.9% did not state their religion.

The economic activity of residents aged 16–74 was 49.7% in full-time employment, 10.8% in part-time employment, 6.9% self-employed, 3.1% unemployed, 1.8% students with jobs, 1.6% students without jobs, 10.1% retired, 7.7% looking after home or family, 4.8% permanently sick or disabled and 3.5% economically inactive for other reasons. The industry of employment of residents was 22% retail, 14.6% manufacturing, 10% construction, 10.6% real estate, 10.2% health and social work, 5.6% education, 9% transport and communications, 3.8% public administration, 3.4% hotels and restaurants, 4.5% finance, 0.6% agriculture and 5.7% other. Of the ward's residents aged 16–74, 12% had a higher education qualification or the equivalent, compared with 19.9% nationwide.

By the 2021 census the population was approximately 12,890. This growth reflects new housing developments around the village and the general expansion of the Dartford area. The population is largely suburban in character. In 2011, over 90% of residents identified as White British, and Christianity was the largest religious affiliation, though these figures are gradually changing in line with regional trends. The median age is in the mid-30s, reflecting many families and commuters.
