= Longfield =

Village in the Borough of Dartford, Kent, England

Coordinates: 51.3962°N 0.3046°E

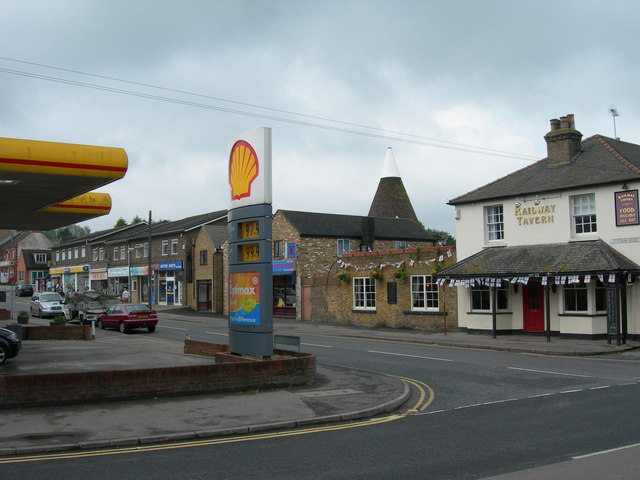
- Station Road showing oast houses converted into shops

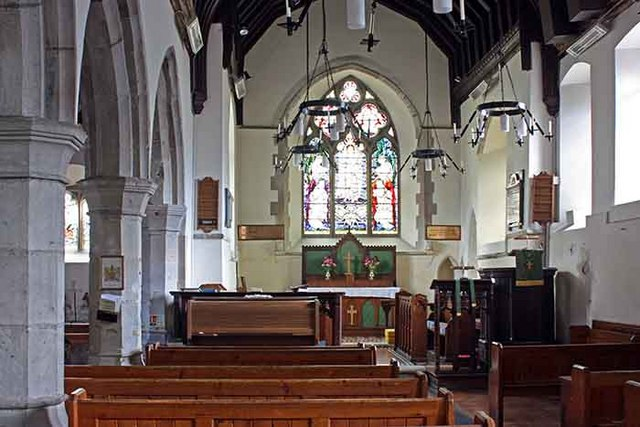
- Interior of parish church

- Location within Kent
- Population: 4,919 (civil parish 2011)
- OS grid reference: TQ604688
- Civil parish: Longfield and New Barn
- District: Dartford
- Shire county: Kent
- Region: South East
- Country: England
- Sovereign state: United Kingdom
- Post town: LONGFIELD
- Postcode district: DA3
- Dialling code: 01474
- Police: Kent
- Fire: Kent
- Ambulance: South East Coast
- UK Parliament: Dartford

Longfield is a village in the Borough of Dartford, Kent, England. It is located 6 miles southeast of Dartford and the same distance southwest of Gravesend.

== History ==
The place in Kent is recorded as Langanfelda in the Saxon Charters of 964–995, and as Langafel in the Domesday Book of 1086.

It had been proposed by town planner Patrick Abercrombie as part of the Greater London Plan in the mid-1940s to build a new town in the Longfield area, however other satellite areas around London were selected instead.

== Localities ==
Longfield and New Barn is a civil parish named after the adjacent villages it covers, the eastern part being New Barn, it also covers the smaller settlement, the neighbourhood of Longfield Hill. Longfield is the ancient village, situated on the road between Dartford and Meopham; the historic church there is dedicated to St Mary Magdalene. New Barn is larger in population than Longfield, although has little in the way of services, being a comparatively recent development and purely residential in nature.

== Topography ==
Longfield is four miles south east of Dartford and near Gravesend. It is a linear development that is partly contiguous with the village of Hartley immediately to the south.

The whole civil parish gently slopes from southeast and south to north. Elevations range from 92m AOD in the southwest of the developed area of New Barn in the east which is on a wide rise, to 45m AOD in and around the chalk pit just west of Longfield across the largely disused HS1 south-of-London link railway line towards Southfleet (just north of the village). Just above this is the tiny settlement, a farmed area named Pinden, to the south, however before this on the road towards London is another named community, no more than a row of cottages on the road named Whitehill.

The villages of New Barn and Longfield are within and give their names to the civil parish of Longfield and New Barn which also covers the settlement of Longfield Hill. Longfield is the ancient village, situated on the road between Dartford and Meopham. New Barn is larger in population than Longfield, although has little in the way of services, being a recent development and purely a residential location.

== Governance ==
Longfield fell within the Hundred of Axtane and its successor Dartford Rural District. The Local Government Act 1972 made the village part of the Sevenoaks district of Kent on 1 April 1974. It was transferred to the borough of Dartford on 1 April 1987 where it has remained since.

It has been in the Dartford parliamentary constituency since 1983.

Dr Howard Stoate (Labour), who had been the MP since 1997, decided not to stand again as a candidate at the 2010 general election. His successor candidate was defeated by Gareth Johnson (Conservative) at that election.

== Economy ==
The village has a shopping area consisting of a local baker and butcher, two local supermarkets, a post office, chemist, estate agents, hair-dressers, various restaurants and take-aways, a pet supply store and an undertakers.

== Culture ==
There is one pub in Longfield, the Railway Tavern. The Wheatsheaf, a 15th-century thatched pub, outside the village on the B255 road to Bluewater, closed down in 2011. The Long Valley Club and the Hartley Country Club are club-based venues restricted to paid membership. Other pubs in the area include the Green Man on Longfield Hill, the White Swan near Ash and the Rising Sun in Fawkham.

The church is dedicated to St Mary Magdalene, and was built in 1343. It is a Grade II* listed building

== Transport ==
=== Rail ===
Longfield railway station connects the village with Southeastern services to London Victoria via Bromley South, Ramsgate via Chatham and Dover Priory via Chatham and Canterbury East.

=== Buses ===
Longfield is served by Brookline Coaches route 479 and 1st Bus Stop route 489. These connect it with Gravesend, Bluewater, Darenth and New Ash Green.

== See also ==
- Listed buildings in Longfield and New Barn
