= Borough of Dartford =

Dartford Borough of Dartford
- Borough and non-metropolitan district
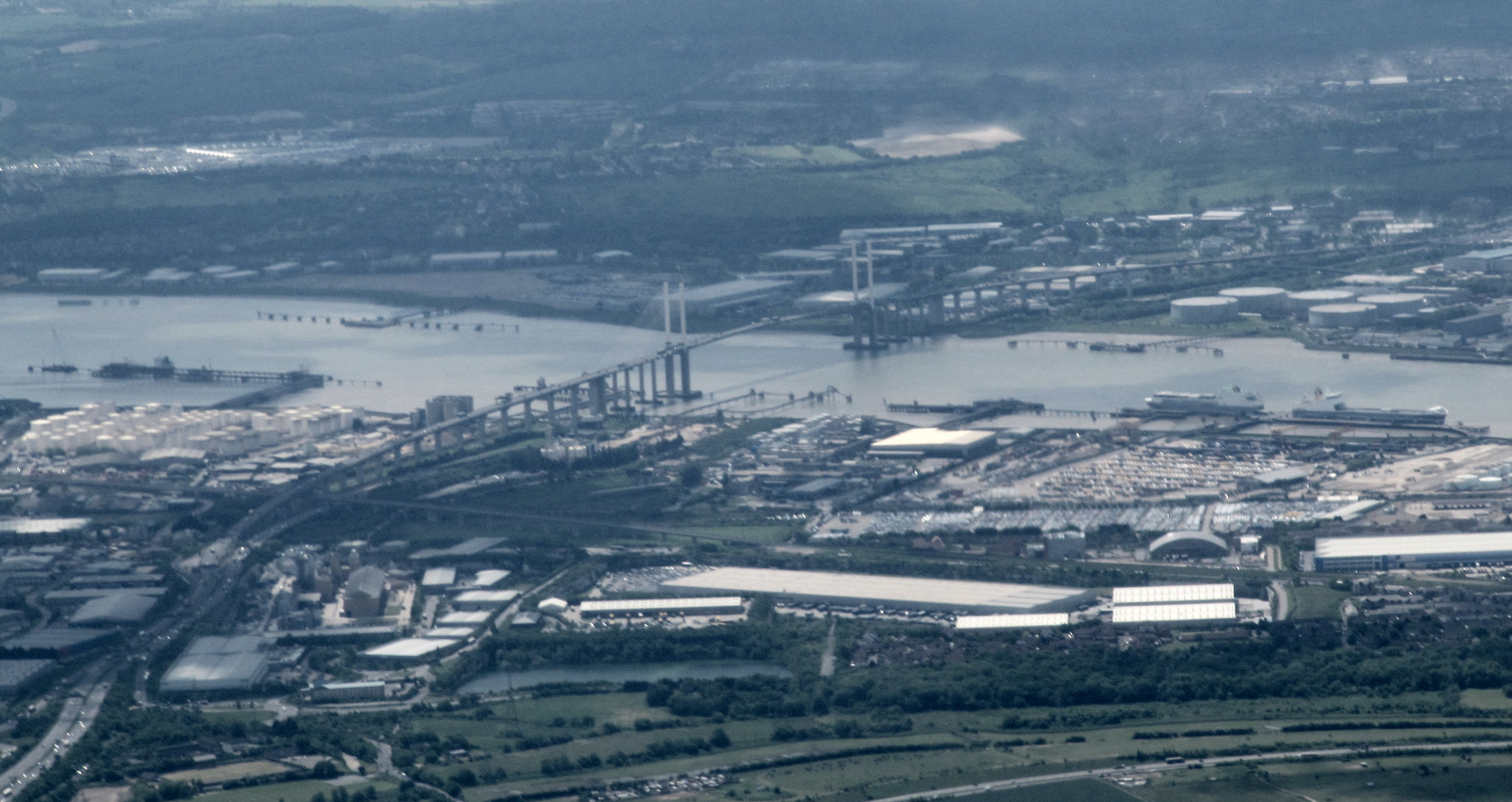
- Aerial view of Dartford and the Dartford Crossing over the River Thames

- Dartford shown within Kent
- Sovereign state: United Kingdom
- Constituent country: England
- Region: South East England
- Non-metropolitan county: Kent
- Status: Non-metropolitan district, Borough
- Admin HQ: Dartford
- Incorporated: 1 April 1974

Government
  - Type: Non-metropolitan district council
  - Body: Dartford Borough Council
  - Leadership: Leader & Cabinet (Conservative)
  - MPs: Jim Dickson

Area
  - Total: 28.10 sq mi (72.77 km^{2})
  - Rank: 227th (of 296)

Population (2024)
  - Total: 125,011
  - Rank: 196th (of 296)
  - Density: 4,449/sq mi (1,718/km^{2})

Ethnicity (2021)
  - Ethnic groups: List: 74.5% White; 10.5% Black; 9.9% Asian; 3.1% Mixed; 2% other

Religion (2021)
  - Religion: List: 48.1% Christianity; 36.5% no religion; 5.3% not stated; 3.8% Hinduism; 3.5% Islam; 1.7% Sikhism; 0.6% Buddhism; 0.4% other; 0.1% Judaism
- Time zone: UTC0 (GMT)
  - Summer (DST): UTC+1 (BST)
- ONS code: 29UD (ONS); E07000107 (GSS)
- OS grid reference: TQ538739

The Borough of Dartford is a local government district with borough status in the north-west of the county of Kent, England. It is named after its main town of Dartford, where the council is based. Other notable settlements include Greenhithe, Stone and Swanscombe, along with an emerging new town at Ebbsfleet, and a number of smaller villages. It also includes Bluewater, one of the UK's largest shopping centres. The borough lies just outside the administrative boundary of Greater London, but a sizeable part of it lies within the M25 motorway which encircles London. Many of the borough's urban areas form part of the Greater London Built-up Area. The borough had a population of 116,800 at the 2021 census.

The neighbouring districts (clockwise from east) are Gravesham, Sevenoaks, the London Borough of Bexley and, to the north across the River Thames, Thurrock, to which it is linked by the Dartford Crossing.

Under current local government reorganisation plans, all district councils in Kent, as well as the county council, will be abolished in 2028, with the district becoming part of a new North Kent unitary authority.

== History ==
The first local authority for the town of Dartford was a body of improvement commissioners established in 1814 to maintain and light the streets and establish a watch. The commissioners were superseded in 1850 when the parish of Dartford was made a local board district, governed by an elected local board. Such districts were converted into urban districts under the Local Government Act 1894. The Dartford Urban District was incorporated to become a municipal borough in 1933.

The modern district was created on 1 April 1974 under the Local Government Act 1972, covering the whole area of two former districts and five parishes from a third district. The three districts were all abolished at the same time:

- Dartford Municipal Borough
- Dartford Rural District (parishes of Darenth, Southfleet, Stone, Sutton-at-Hone and Wilmington only, rest went to Sevenoaks)
- Swanscombe Urban District (included Greenhithe)

The new district was named Dartford after its largest town. The new district was not initially made a borough, and the town of Dartford was therefore given charter trustees to preserve its right to appoint a ceremonial mayor. The new district was subsequently awarded borough status in April 1977, since when the chair of the council has taken the title of mayor instead.

The borough was enlarged in 1987 to take in the parish of Longfield from Sevenoaks District.

== Governance ==
Dartford Borough Council

Leadership
- Mayor: Avtar Sandhu, Conservative since 6 May 2026
- Leader: Jeremy Kite, Conservative since 27 February 2006
- Chief Executive: Sarah Martin since April 2021

Structure
- Seats: 42 councillors
- Political groups: Administration (28) Conservative (28) Other parties (13) Labour (10) Reform UK (2) Independent (2)

Elections
- Voting system: First past the post
- Last election: 4 May 2023

Meeting place
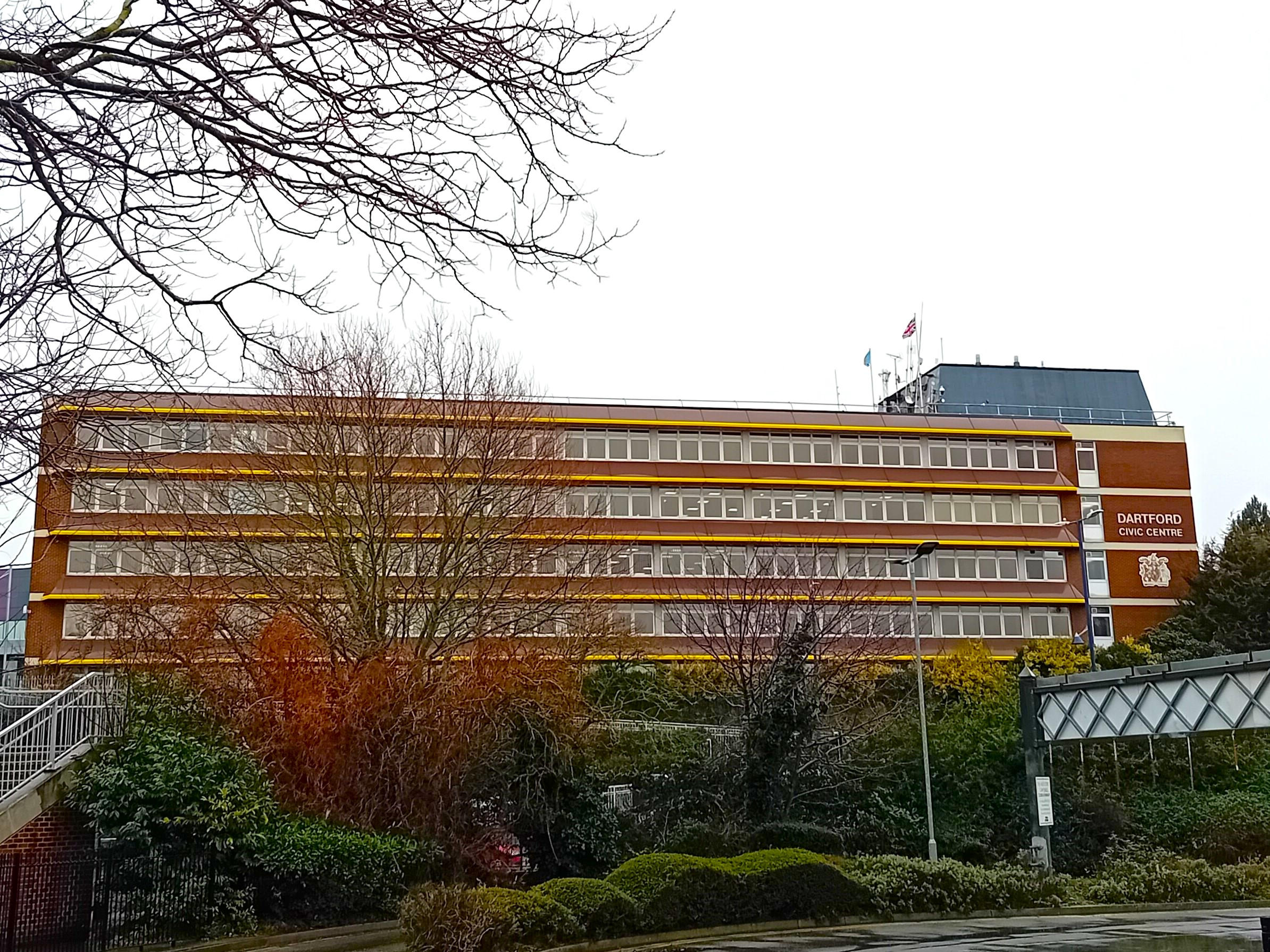
- Dartford Civic Centre, Home Gardens, Dartford, DA1 1DR

Website
- www.dartford.gov.uk

Dartford Borough Council provides district-level services. County-level services are provided by Kent County Council. Parts of the borough are covered by civil parishes, which form a third tier of local government for their areas.

=== Political control ===
The council has been under Conservative majority control since 2007.

Political control of the council since the 1974 reforms has been as follows:

Party in control	Years
Labour	1974–1983
Conservative	1983–1995
Labour	1995–2003
No overall control	2003–2007
Conservative	2007–present

=== Leadership ===
The role of mayor is largely ceremonial in Dartford. Political leadership is instead provided by the leader of the council. The leaders since 1974 have been:

Councillor	Party	From	To
Ivor Jones	Labour	1974	1982
Malcolm Nothard	Conservative	1983	1991
Kenneth Leadbeater	Conservative	1991	1995
Ivor Jones	Labour	1995	1998
John Muckle	Labour	1998	May 2003
Kenneth Leadbeater	Conservative	21 May 2003	20 Feb 2006
Jeremy Kite	Conservative	27 Feb 2006	

=== Composition ===
Following the 2023 election, and subsequent by-elections and changes of allegiance up to May 2026, the composition of the council was:

Party	Councillors
Conservative	28
Labour	10
Reform	2
Independent	2
Total	42

=== Elections ===
Since the last full review of boundaries in 2019 the council has comprised 42 councillors representing 20 wards, with each ward electing one, two or three councillors. Elections are held every four years.

The Dartford constituency covers a similar but not identical area to the borough. The Member of Parliament (MP) since 2024 has been Jim Dickson (Labour).

=== Premises ===
The council is based at Dartford Civic Centre on Home Gardens in the centre of Dartford.

=== Dartford Youth Council ===
Dartford also has a youth council called the Dartford Youth Council (DYC) which comprises members of the youth representing local secondary schools, youth groups (such as Scouts). They discuss important issues relating to the youth of Dartford, such as mental health, to staying fit and how they can help and combat those issues. They attend a monthly meeting, at the Civic Centre. They have represented Dartford's youth in several events. Every November, members attend and represent Dartford Youth Council in the annual Dartford Remembrance Parade.

== Transportation ==
=== Railways ===
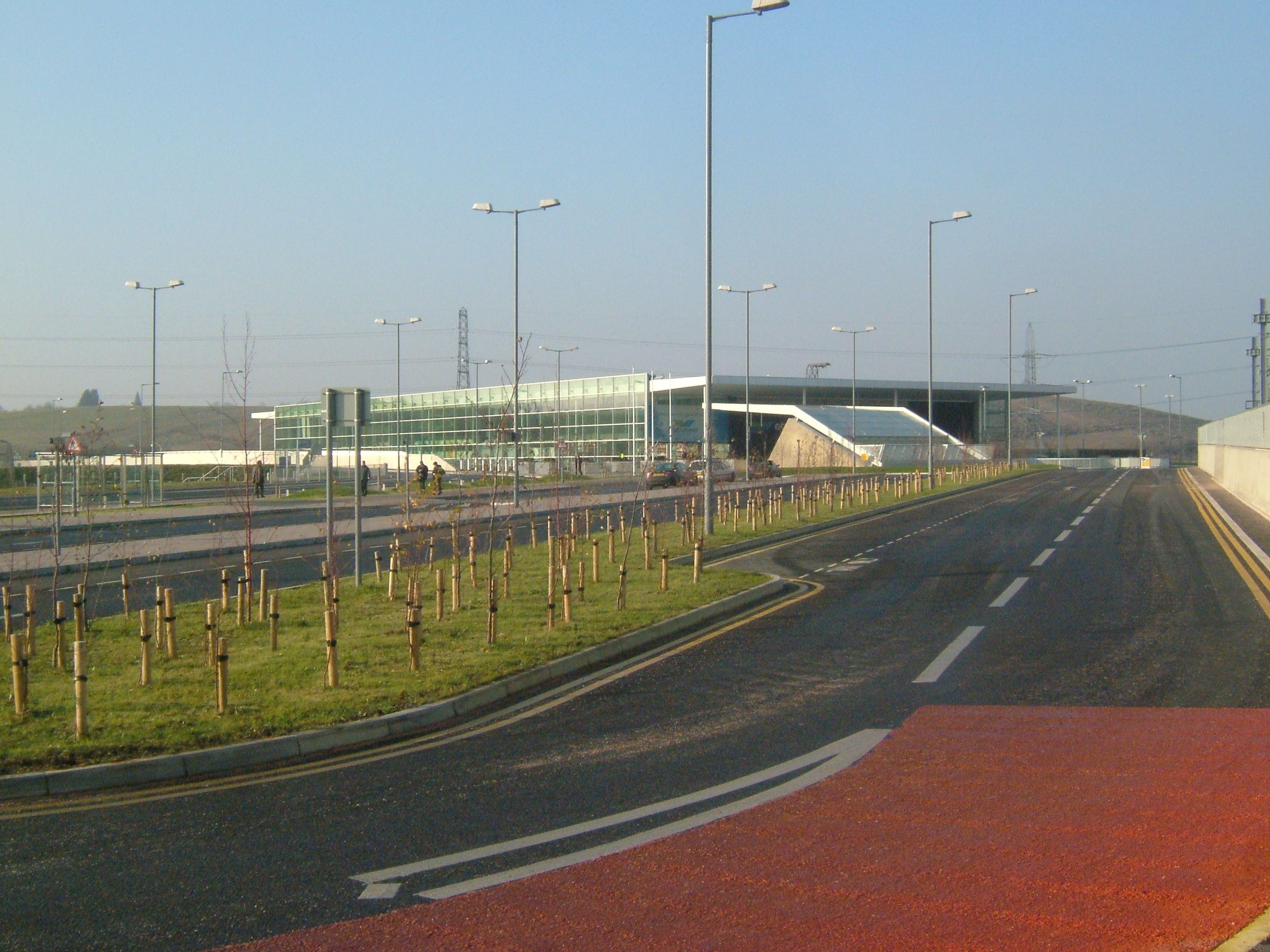
Ebbsfleet International

There are seven railway stations in the borough: at Stone; Greenhithe (for Bluewater); Swanscombe and Dartford, all on the North Kent Line; and Longfield and Farningham Road on the Victoria – Chatham Main Line. From Dartford there are three lines serving London and one to Gravesend, the Medway Towns and eastern Kent. For many services Dartford is the terminus.

Ebbsfleet International railway station on High Speed 1 opened in the east of the borough on 19 November 2007. Six high-speed services to Paris and five to Brussels ran daily from here by Eurostar. However since the Covid Pandemic trains destined for the Continent no longer stop in Kent at all. Despite efforts to reverse this decision, Eurostar have said they will only reconsider the situation sometime in 2025. The station still carries commuters to St Pancras station in London in only 17 minutes, and to Stratford International (next to the 2012 Summer Olympics site) in just 10 minutes, while eastbound commuter services link Ebbsfleet to Ashford International, Dover, Folkestone and other stations in Kent.

=== Notable bus service ===
The first of the Fastrack bus services, using a combination of ordinary roads and dedicated 'bus tracks' commenced in March 2006. The service runs from the Temple Hill area of Dartford, through the town centre and on to Bluewater Shopping Centre, Greenhithe, Ebbsfleet International and Gravesend.

=== Roads ===
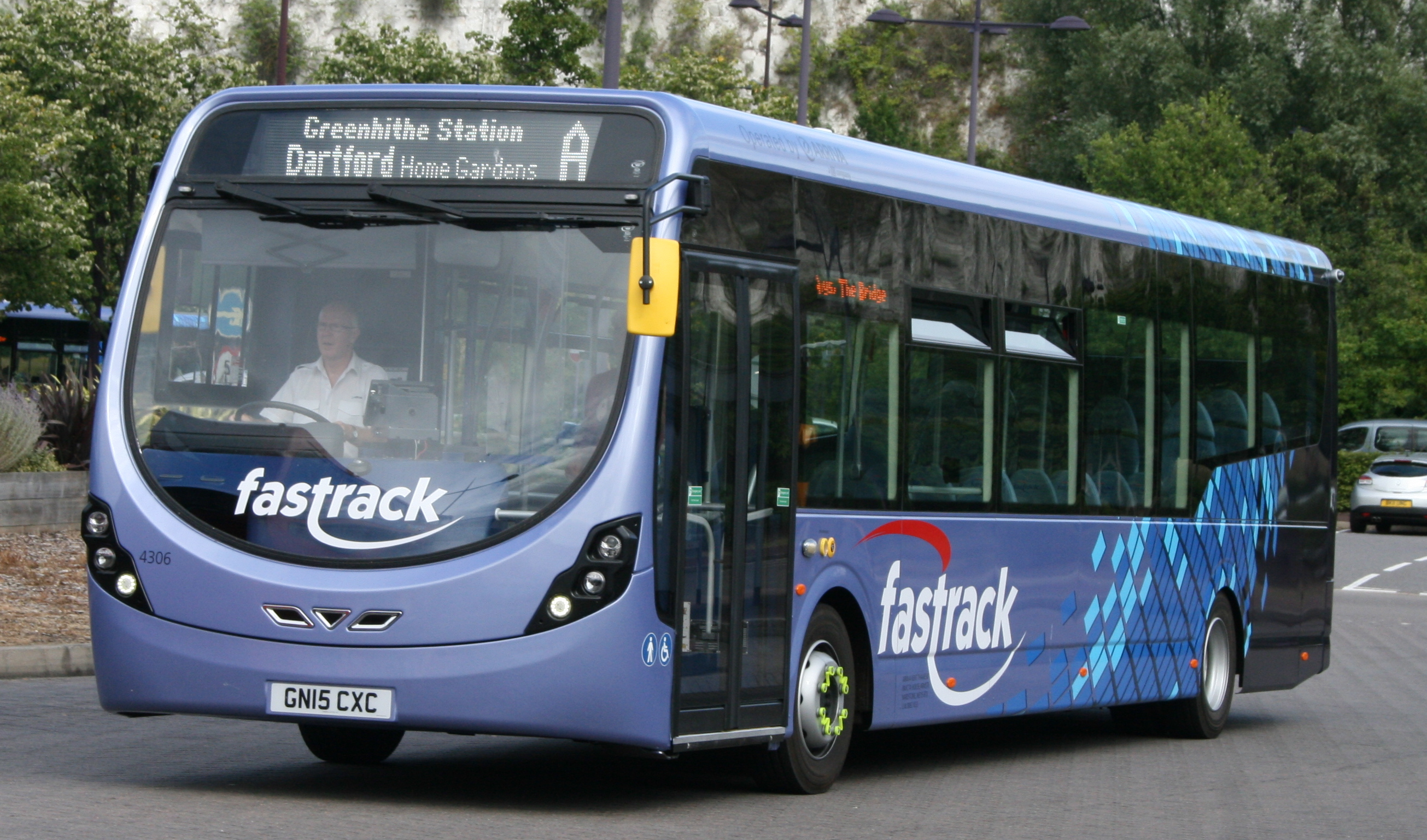
Fastrack at Bluewater Shopping Centre

Three of the county's main roads pass through the borough boundaries: the M25 and M20 motorways and the A2 dual carriageway. The A20, A225 and the A226 roads also cross the borough, among others.

Dartford gives its name to the Dartford Crossing of the River Thames, a pair of road tunnels (constructed in 1963 and 1980), with the Queen Elizabeth II Bridge (October 1991), dual-linking Kent with Essex and connecting sections of the London Orbital M25 motorway.

== Housing and architecture ==
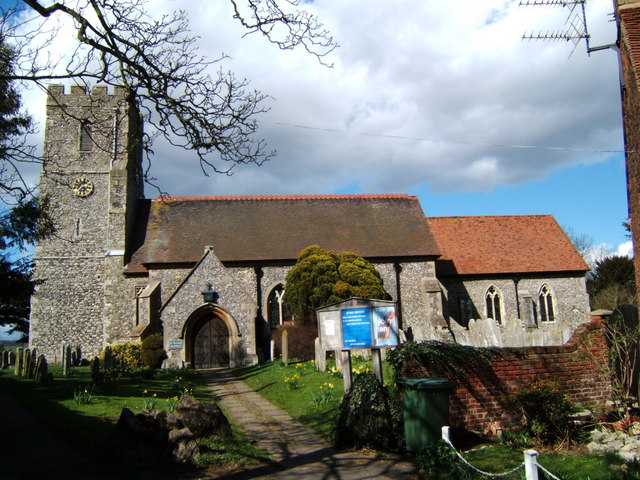
St Nicholas's church, Southfleet, is in the borough.

The layout of the district is clustered development in the northern half and buffered, dispersed settlement interspersed by the North Downs which is an escarpment of varied farms and woodland in the south.

- The M25 motorway bisects the district
- Swanscombe and Greenhithe have low rise homes and mid rise by the river Thames.

Housing is a mixture of relatively high rise in Dartford centre through to low rise in all of the villages.

The number of listed buildings in the district exceeds 50. This includes 7 churches listed in the highest grading in the national listing system (Grade I).

== Demography ==
=== 2011 census ===
The population rose in the 10 years to 2011 from 85,911 to 97,365, by 13.3%, which was above the national average.

87.3% of residents were born in England, which was 2.5% higher than the average for the South East. The next most common group of countries of birth was the non-EU, however this was 0.3% lower than the average for the South-East and 2% lower than the average for England.

As to residents of EU birth, only 3.3% of the population were such, slightly below the national average and two-thirds of this migration was from the accession countries from 2001 to 2011, a 12.5% higher proportion than that seen nationwide.

As to older people, the borough has a below national and regional proportion. In common with most of the country, an increase in people living in their area above the age of 74 took place, whether through change in preference or most commonly longevity, from 6.5% in 2001 to 7.1% in 2011.

With 80.8% of households with a car or van, this was 6.6% above the national average, however still marginally lower than South East's record and national-high of 81.4%.

1.0% of the population lived in a communal establishment in the area.

As to homes, as 12.6% of properties in the area are detached, these form a smaller minority than the regional and national averages (at 28.0% and 22.3% of dwellings respectively).

Its people in 2011 were more economically active than the regional and national average; while self-employed inhabitants were at parity with the national average, those in full-time employment were 6.0% greater.

As to religion, statistics mirrored closely the national average, save that more Hindus and Sikhs live in the borough, at a combined, equally split 3.2% of the total population and fewer Muslims, also forming 1.6% of the population. Being almost at the mean for the country, Christians form just over 60% of the area's population.

== Employment ==
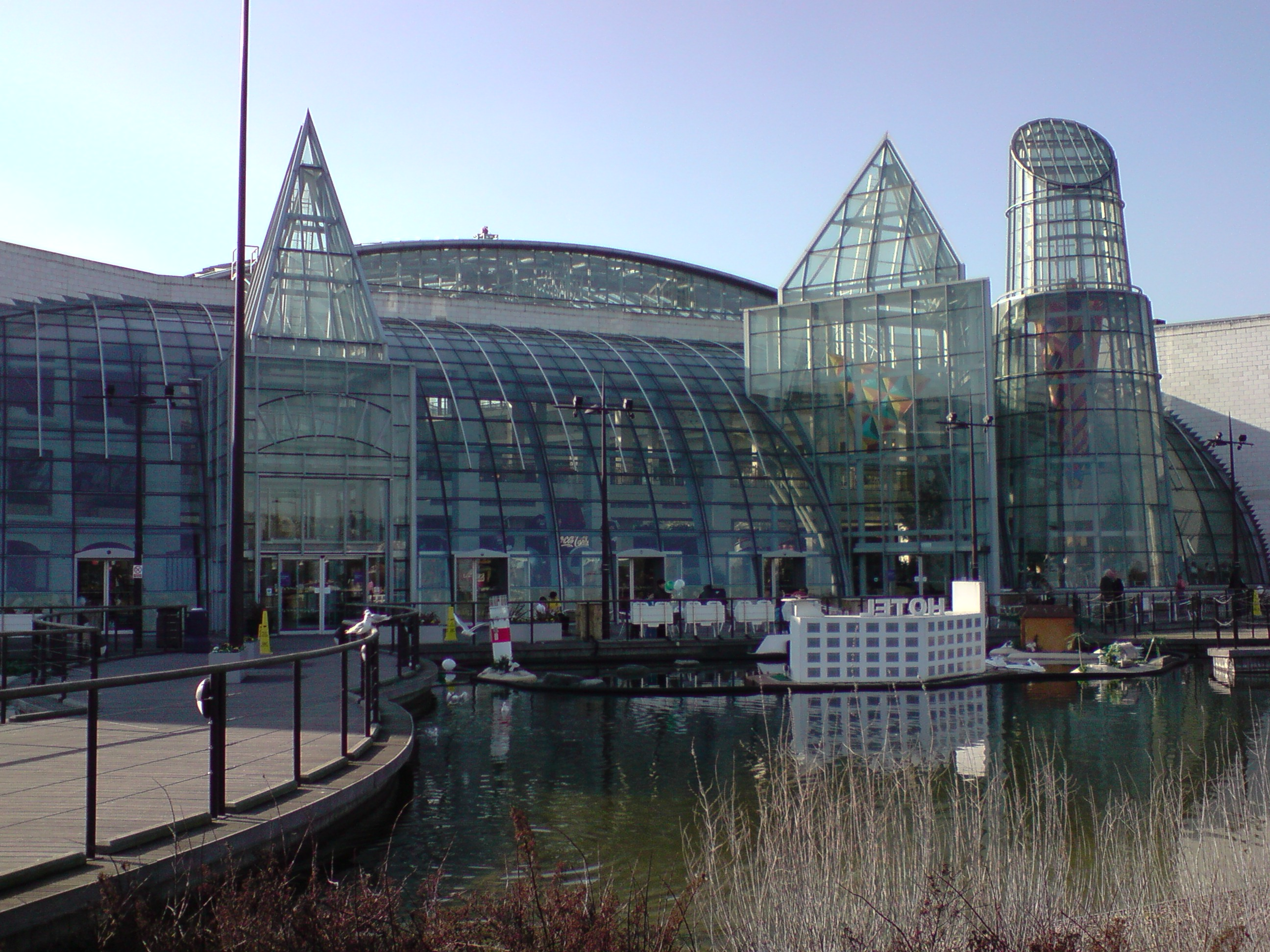
Exterior of Bluewater

Although many of area's traditional industries of papermaking, cement, and pharmaceuticals are in decline or closing down, and many of borough's inhabitants travel away from the borough by rail and road (many commuting to London and other areas for work), there is still a large industrial and commercial base. Included among those areas include 'The Bridge' and Crossways to either side of the Queen Elizabeth II Bridge, areas around Greenhithe and a 740-acre (3.0 km^{2}) site planned to contain five separate 'villages' in the Eastern Quarry near Bluewater Shopping Centre, itself a large employer.

In 2012 plans were announced for the London Resort, envisaged as a major theme park to be built on the Swanscombe Peninsula, which at the time was said to be able to create up to 27,000 jobs by 2018. As of 2023 no development had taken place.

== Towns and parishes ==
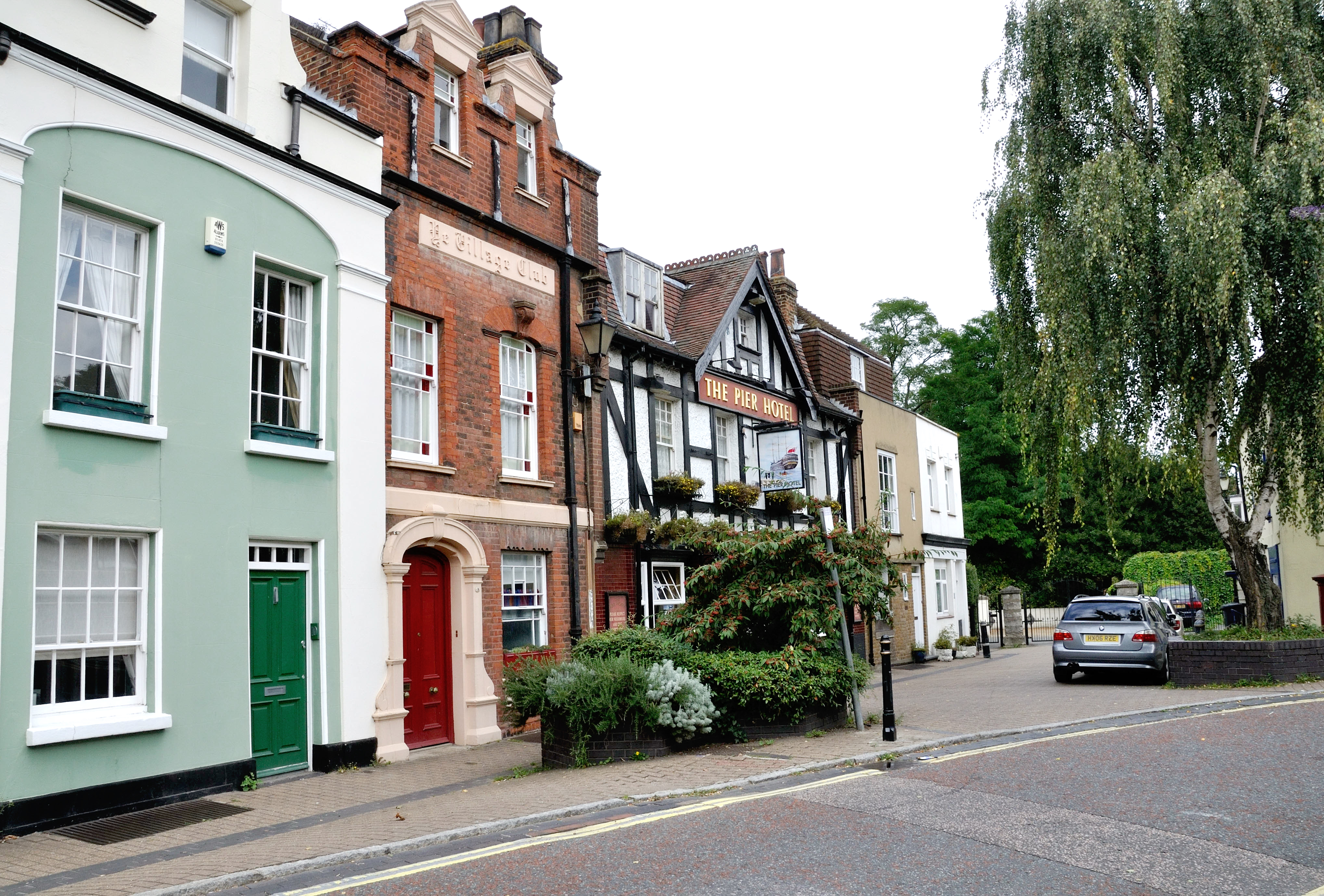
High Street in Greenhithe

There are eight civil parishes in the borough. The parish council for Swanscombe and Greenhithe has declared that parish to be a town, allowing it to take the name "Swanscombe and Greenhithe Town Council". The main part of the Dartford urban area, roughly corresponding to the pre-1974 borough, is unparished, as is the Ebbsfleet area which was removed from the parish of Swanscombe and Greenhithe in 2019. Dartford, Greenhithe, Longfield and Swanscombe are all post towns.

- Bean
- Darenth
- Longfield and New Barn
- Southfleet
- Stone
- Sutton-at-Hone and Hawley
- Swanscombe and Greenhithe
- Wilmington

== See also ==
- Grade I listed buildings in Dartford (borough)
- Grade II* listed buildings in Dartford (borough)
