= List of grammar schools in England =

Grammar school areas and groups as identified by the Education (Grammar School Ballots) Regulations 1998. LEAs considered grammar areas are shown filled, while circles indicate isolated grammar schools or clusters of neighbouring schools.

This is a list of the current 163 state-funded fully selective schools (grammar schools) in England, as enumerated by Statutory Instrument. The 1998 Statutory Instrument listed 166 such schools. However, in 2000 Bristol Local Education Authority, following consultation, implemented changes removing selection by 11+ exam from the entry requirements for two of the schools on this original list. Two schools (Chatham House Grammar School and Clarendon House Grammar School) merged in 2013. This list does not include former direct grant grammar schools which elected to remain independent, often retaining the title grammar school. For such schools see the list of direct grant grammar schools.

Under the Tripartite System of secondary education in England between the 1940s and 1960s, approximately a quarter of children were selected by the eleven plus exam for entry to grammar schools, either LEA-maintained grammar schools fully funded by the local education authority, or direct grant grammar schools funded by the Ministry of Education. Most of the maintained grammar schools were closed or converted to comprehensive schools in the 1960s and 1970s, though a few local authorities resisted this move and retained a selective system. There are also a number of isolated grammar schools, which admit the candidates who score highest on their entry tests.

In addition to and distinct from grammar schools, selection for entry to state schools also continues at partially-selective schools (sometimes known as bilateral schools). While technically classified as comprehensive schools, they occupy a middle ground between grammar schools and true comprehensives, and many of the arguments for and against grammar schools also apply to these schools.

The remaining 163 English state grammar schools are listed here grouped by region (from north to south) and Local Education Authority. There are no remaining state grammar schools in North East England. The gender indicated is that of the main school (ages 11–16). Several single-sex schools have sixth forms that also admit a small number of students of the opposite sex.

== North West England ==
=== Cumbria ===
- Queen Elizabeth Grammar School, Penrith (mixed)

=== Lancashire ===
- Bacup and Rawtenstall Grammar School, Waterfoot (mixed)
- Clitheroe Royal Grammar School, Clitheroe (mixed)
- Lancaster Girls' Grammar School, Lancaster (girls)
- Lancaster Royal Grammar School, Lancaster (boys)

=== Liverpool ===
- Liverpool Blue Coat School, Wavertree (mixed)

=== Trafford ===
- Altrincham Grammar School for Boys, Bowdon (boys)
- Altrincham Grammar School for Girls, Bowdon (girls)
- Loreto Grammar School, Altrincham (girls)
- Sale Grammar School, Sale (mixed)
- St. Ambrose College, Hale Barns (boys)
- Stretford Grammar School, Stretford (mixed)
- Urmston Grammar School, Urmston (mixed)

=== Wirral ===
- Calday Grange Grammar School, West Kirby (boys)
- St Anselm's College, Birkenhead (boys)
- Upton Hall School FCJ, Upton (girls)
- West Kirby Grammar School, West Kirby (girls)
- Wirral Grammar School for Boys, Bebington (boys)
- Wirral Grammar School for Girls, Bebington (girls)

== Yorkshire and the Humber ==
=== Calderdale ===
- The Crossley Heath School, Halifax (mixed)
- North Halifax Grammar School, Halifax (mixed)

=== Kirklees ===
- Heckmondwike Grammar School, Heckmondwike (mixed)

=== North Yorkshire ===
- Ermysted's Grammar School, Skipton (boys)
- Ripon Grammar School, Ripon (mixed)
- Skipton Girls' High School, Skipton (girls)

== East Midlands ==
=== Lincolnshire ===
- Boston Grammar School, Boston (boys)
- Boston High School, Boston (girls)
- Bourne Grammar School, Bourne (mixed)
- Caistor Grammar School, Caistor (mixed)
- Carre's Grammar School, Sleaford (boys)
- Kesteven and Grantham Girls' School, Grantham (girls)
- Kesteven and Sleaford High School, Sleaford (girls)
- King Edward VI Grammar School, Louth (mixed)
- The King's School, Grantham (boys)
- Queen Elizabeth's Grammar School, Alford (mixed)
- Queen Elizabeth's Grammar School, Horncastle (mixed)
- Queen Elizabeth's High School, Gainsborough (mixed)
- Skegness Grammar School, Skegness (mixed)
- Spalding Grammar School, Spalding (boys)
- Spalding High School, Spalding (girls)

== West Midlands ==
=== Birmingham ===
- Bishop Vesey's Grammar School, Sutton Coldfield (mixed)
- Handsworth Grammar School, Handsworth (boys)
- King Edward VI Aston School, Aston (boys)
- King Edward VI Camp Hill School for Boys, Kings Heath (boys)
- King Edward VI Camp Hill School for Girls, Kings Heath (girls)
- King Edward VI Five Ways School, Bartley Green (mixed)
- King Edward VI Handsworth School, Handsworth (girls)
- Sutton Coldfield Grammar School for Girls, Sutton Coldfield (girls)

=== Stoke-on-Trent ===
- St. Joseph's College, Stoke-on-Trent (mixed)

=== Telford and Wrekin ===
- Haberdashers' Adams, (Mixed)
- Newport Girls High School, Newport (girls)

=== Walsall ===
- Queen Mary's Grammar School, Walsall (boys)
- Queen Mary's High School, Walsall (girls)

=== Warwickshire ===
- Alcester Grammar School, Alcester (mixed)
- King Edward VI School, Stratford-upon-Avon (boys)
- Lawrence Sheriff School, Rugby (boys)
- Rugby High School for Girls, Rugby (girls)
- Stratford-upon-Avon Grammar School for Girls, Stratford-upon-Avon (girls)

=== Wolverhampton ===
- Wolverhampton Girls' High School, Newbridge (girls)

== East of England ==
=== Essex ===
- Chelmsford County High School for Girls, Chelmsford (girls)
- Colchester County High School for Girls, Colchester (girls)
- Colchester Royal Grammar School, Colchester (boys)
- King Edward VI Grammar School, Chelmsford (boys)

=== Southend-on-Sea ===
- Southend High School for Boys, Southend-on-Sea (boys)
- Southend High School for Girls, Southend-on-Sea (girls)
- Westcliff High School for Boys, Westcliff-on-Sea (boys)
- Westcliff High School for Girls, Westcliff-on-Sea (girls)

== South East England ==
=== Buckinghamshire ===
- Aylesbury Grammar School, Aylesbury (boys)
- Aylesbury High School, Aylesbury (girls)
- Beaconsfield High School, Beaconsfield (girls)
- Burnham Grammar School, Burnham (mixed)
- Chesham Grammar School, Chesham (mixed)
- Dr Challoner's Grammar School, Amersham (boys)
- Dr Challoner's High School, Little Chalfont (girls)
- John Hampden Grammar School, High Wycombe (boys)
- Royal Grammar School, High Wycombe (boys)
- Royal Latin School, Buckingham (mixed)
- Sir Henry Floyd Grammar School, Aylesbury (mixed)
- Sir William Borlase's Grammar School, Marlow (mixed)
- Wycombe High School, High Wycombe (girls)

=== Kent ===
- Barton Court Grammar School, Canterbury (mixed)
- Borden Grammar School, Sittingbourne (boys)
- Chatham and Clarendon Grammar School, Ramsgate (mixed)
- Cranbrook School, Cranbrook (mixed)
- Dane Court Grammar School, Broadstairs (mixed)
- Dartford Grammar School, Dartford (boys)
- Dartford Grammar School for Girls, Dartford (girls)
- Dover Grammar School for Boys, Dover (boys)
- Dover Grammar School for Girls, Dover (girls)
- Folkestone School for Girls, Folkestone (girls)
- Gravesend Grammar School, Gravesend (boys)
- Mayfield Grammar School, Gravesend (girls)
- Harvey Grammar School, Folkestone (boys)
- Highsted Grammar School, Sittingbourne (girls)
- Highworth Grammar School for Girls, Ashford (girls)
- Invicta Grammar School, Maidstone (girls)
- The Judd School, Tonbridge (boys)
- Maidstone Grammar School, Maidstone (boys)
- Maidstone Grammar School for Girls, Maidstone (girls)
- The Norton Knatchbull School, Ashford (boys)
- Oakwood Park Grammar School, Maidstone (boys)
- Queen Elizabeth's Grammar School, Faversham (mixed)
- Simon Langton Grammar School for Boys, Canterbury (boys)
- Simon Langton Grammar School for Girls, Canterbury (girls)
- Sir Roger Manwood's School, Sandwich (mixed)
- The Skinners' School, Tunbridge Wells (boys)
- Tonbridge Grammar School, Tonbridge (girls)
- Tunbridge Wells Girls' Grammar School, Tunbridge Wells (girls)
- Tunbridge Wells Grammar School for Boys, Tunbridge Wells (boys)
- Weald of Kent Grammar School, Tonbridge (girls)
- Wilmington Grammar School for Boys, Wilmington (boys)
- Wilmington Grammar School for Girls, Wilmington (girls)

=== Medway ===
- Holcombe Grammar School, Chatham (boys)
- Chatham Grammar School for Girls, Chatham (girls)
- Fort Pitt Grammar School, Chatham (girls)
- Rainham Mark Grammar School, Rainham (mixed)
- Sir Joseph Williamson's Mathematical School, Rochester (boys)
- Rochester Grammar School, Rochester (girls)

=== Reading ===
- Kendrick Girls' Grammar School, Reading (girls)
- Reading School, Reading (boys)

=== Slough ===
- Herschel Grammar School, Slough (mixed)
- Langley Grammar School, Langley (mixed)
- Upton Court Grammar School, Slough (mixed)
- St Bernard's Catholic Grammar School, Langley (mixed)

== South West England ==
=== Bournemouth ===
- Bournemouth School, Bournemouth (boys)
- Bournemouth School for Girls, Bournemouth (girls)

=== Devon ===
- Colyton Grammar School, Colyford (mixed)

=== Gloucestershire ===
- The Crypt School, Gloucester (mixed)
- Denmark Road High School, Gloucester (girls)
- Marling School, Stroud (boys)
- Pate's Grammar School, Cheltenham (mixed)
- Ribston Hall High School, Gloucester (girls)
- Sir Thomas Rich's School, Longlevens, Gloucester (boys)
- Stroud High School, Stroud (girls)

=== Plymouth ===
- Devonport High School for Boys, Plymouth (boys)
- Devonport High School for Girls, Plymouth (girls)
- Plymouth High School for Girls, Plymouth (girls)

=== Poole ===
- Parkstone Grammar School, Poole (girls)
- Poole Grammar School, Poole (boys)

=== Torbay ===
- Churston Ferrers Grammar School, Galmpton (mixed)
- Torquay Boys' Grammar School, Torquay (boys)
- Torquay Grammar School for Girls, Torquay (girls)

=== Wiltshire ===
- Bishop Wordsworth's School, Salisbury (boys)
- South Wilts Grammar School, Salisbury (girls)

== Greater London ==
=== Barnet ===
- Henrietta Barnett School, Hampstead Garden Suburb (girls)
- Queen Elizabeth's Grammar School for Boys, Barnet (boys)
- St. Michael's Catholic Grammar School, North Finchley (girls)

=== Bexley ===
- Beths Grammar School, Bexley (boys)
- Bexley Grammar School, Welling (mixed)
- Chislehurst and Sidcup Grammar School, Sidcup (mixed)
- Townley Grammar School, Bexleyheath (girls)

=== Bromley ===
- Newstead Wood School, Orpington (girls)
- St Olave's & St Saviour's Grammar School, Orpington (boys)

=== Enfield ===
- The Latymer School, Edmonton (mixed)

=== Kingston upon Thames ===
- Tiffin Girls' School, Kingston upon Thames (girls)
- Tiffin School, Kingston upon Thames (boys)

=== Redbridge ===
- Ilford County High School, Barkingside (boys)
- Woodford County High School, Woodford Green (girls)

=== Sutton ===
- Nonsuch High School for Girls, Cheam (girls)
- Sutton Grammar School for Boys, Sutton (boys)
- Wallington County Grammar School, Wallington (boys)
- Wallington High School for Girls, Wallington (girls)
- Wilson's School, Wallington (boys)

== See also ==
- Armorial of UK schools
- List of English and Welsh endowed schools (19th century)
