= Swanley Village =

Village in Kent, England

Coordinates: 51°24′22″N 0°11′52″E

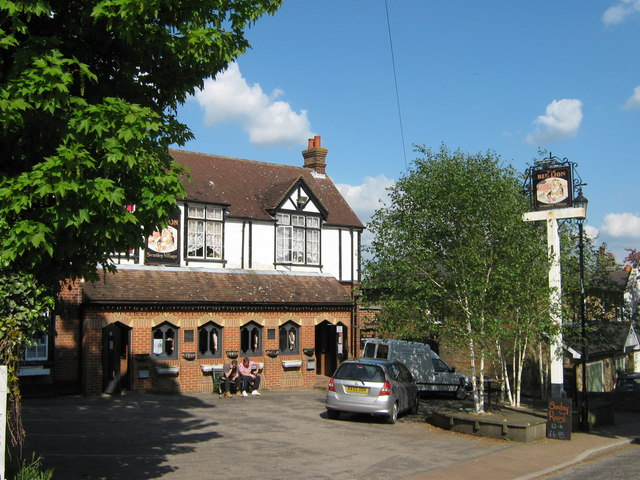
- The Red Lion, Swanley Village

- Location within Kent
- District: Sevenoaks
- Shire county: Kent
- Region: South East
- Country: England
- Sovereign state: United Kingdom
- Post town: SWANLEY
- Postcode district: BR8
- Police: Kent
- Fire: Kent
- Ambulance: South East Coast
- UK Parliament: Sevenoaks

Swanley Village is a village in the Sevenoaks District of Kent, England. It is located 1 mile north east of Swanley & 4.7 miles south west of Dartford.

== History ==
Swanley Village was originally known as Swanley but with the arrival of the London, Chatham and Dover Railway line, specifically the junction between the Chatham Main Line and the Maidstone East Line to the west of the village, a new settlement grew up. This was called "Swanley Junction", but soon grew and became known as "Swanley", with the village thus becoming known as "Swanley Village". Its church is dedicated to St Paul. The local pubs are "The Lamb" and "The Red Lion".

== Transport ==
=== Rail ===
The nearest National Rail station is Swanley, located 1.4 miles away.

=== Buses ===
No bus routes serve Swanley Village directly, however the Arriva Kent Thameside route 477 passes just west of the village boundary on Swanley Lane with services to Dartford via Hextable & Wilmington or to Orpington via Swanley, Crockenhill & St Mary Cray.
