= Beenham murders =

1960s murders of girls in Beenham, UK

The Beenham murders were the murders of a teenage girl and two 9-year-old girls in the Berkshire village of Beenham in 1966 and 1967. Local man David Burgess was found guilty of two murders in 1967—for which two life sentences were handed down—and was given a 27-year sentence for the third in 2012 after new forensic evidence brought a conviction.

== Yolande Waddington ==
Yolande Waddington was seventeen years old and had just begun working for the Jagger family at Oakwood Farm, Clay Lane, Beenham, as a live-in nanny to their young daughter. Waddington was born in Maidstone in Kent and lived with her family in Newbury in Berkshire, about 9 miles (14 km) from Beenham, before moving to Oakwood Farm. At 22:15 GMT on 28 October 1966, Waddington left the farm for the village post box to post a letter to her boyfriend; the walk would have taken about fifteen minutes. At 22:35, she visited the Six Bells pub to buy some cigarettes; this was the last known sighting of her.

When it was noticed the following morning that Waddington had failed to return to Oakwood Farm, the Jagger family telephoned her boyfriend who told them he had no idea where she was. They reported her missing to the police at midday. On 30 October, two farm labourers found bloodstained clothing beneath hay bales in a cow shed on Clay Lane. Waddington's body was found lying in a waterlogged ditch a short distance away.

Waddington's hands had been bound with baling twine and the post-mortem, carried out by home office pathologist Keith Simpson, revealed that the cause of her death was strangulation with a twine ligature. Waddington had also been stabbed twice in her torso; the wounds were about 2 inches (51 mm) deep. The time of death was placed between 22:30 and midnight.

Regional crime squad officers, along with officers from Scotland Yard, were brought into the area. A search around the cow shed for the murder weapon was assisted by US airmen with mine detectors based at nearby USAF Greenham Common. A broken blade from a pen knife, similar to that believed to have been used on Waddington, was recovered. More than 4,000 statements were taken from local people. Analysis of blood on Waddington's clothing revealed traces of a blood group which was different to hers.

In November 1966, every male in Beenham aged between 16 and 50 was invited to give a sample of his blood in one of the first voluntary mass blood tests in UK criminal history. Over 200 men were tested and the samples were examined by forensic scientist Margaret Pereira at Scotland Yard, but no match to Waddington's killer was found.

== Jeanette Wigmore and Jacqueline Williams ==
On 17 April 1967 at 16:00, Jeanette Wigmore and Jacqueline Williams, both aged nine, went out on their bicycles together after school. Twenty minutes later, Wigmore's father, Tony, saw the two girls playing in the lane at the back of his house; this was the last sighting of them.

When Wigmore had not returned home by 18:45, her father grew concerned and went looking for the girls in his car. Williams's father, Terry, also joined the search as did a number of other villagers. As dusk approached, Tony Wigmore drove down to a disused gravel pit, known as Blake's pit, at the junction of Webbs Lane, Admoor Lane and Lambden's Hill. He saw the girls' bicycles lying in the pit and at around 20:30, he found his daughter's body lying face down in water at the bottom of a bank. Williams's body was found at 22:45, about 100 yards (91 m) from Wigmore's; she was lying face down in a pool of water and had been covered with leaves and twigs.

The post-mortem, again carried out by Simpson, found that Wigmore had been stabbed five times and that three wounds in her throat had caused her death. Williams had been manually strangled and then drowned in a pool of water. The time of death for both girls was believed to have been between 17:30 and 18:45. It was suggested that the killer had attacked Williams first and, having sexually assaulted and murdered her, probably realised that Wigmore had witnessed the attack and likely murdered her to silence her.

Eighty highly-trained police officers, along with officers from Scotland Yard, were drafted in to assist with the investigation. The gravel pit was drained and searched with metal detectors for the murder weapon. Villagers provided 1,350 statements and fear descended on the local community with parents ensuring that their children were never out of their sight.

It was widely believed by local people that the person who had murdered the two girls was the same person who had murdered Waddington the previous October.

== Conviction of David Burgess ==
During police interviews, it was established that two brothers were working at Fisher's gravel pits, opposite Blake's pit, around the time Wigmore and Williams were murdered. Burgess's older brother, John, stated that after the last of their colleagues had left at 18:00, Burgess had gone across the lane to check some rabbit snares near Blake's pit. Burgess worked as a dumper driver at the gravel pits and, after supposedly checking the snares, he returned to the office between ten and twenty minutes later. The brothers left work at 18:45 and went to their respective homes. Burgess, along with other men in the village, was asked to give police the clothing he had been wearing on the day the girls had been murdered. During the course of the investigation, he chatted to detectives and admitted that he was in a "dodgy position" as he had been near the pit where the girls had been found. He was also interviewed by the Reading Evening Post on 20 April, stating that he had been interviewed by police about Waddington's death because he had lost a knife similar to the one which had been used to stab her.

Wigmore's blood group was AB/MN which is a rare blood group shared by only 1.5% of the population. Smears of blood from this group were found on Burgess's right boot which he had been wearing on the day the girls had been murdered. This, along with his brother's statement, led to Burgess being charged with the murder of Wigmore on 7 May 1967. A few days before his arrest, Burgess had bought a drink for Williams's father in the Six Bells pub. He was charged with the murder of Williams on 25 May.

Burgess's trial was held at Gloucester Assizes in July 1967. During the trial, he tried to pin the blame on a man called "MacNab" from Reading who he claimed he had seen standing over the body of one of the girls in Blake's pit when he had gone to check the rabbit snares. He claimed he had chased the man away and MacNab had threatened him a few days later. The trial established that MacNab did not exist and Burgess was found guilty of the murders of Wigmore and Williams on 21 July 1967. He was given two life sentences.

Burgess had been born in Beenham village, the second oldest of five children. His mother had moved to the area from Yorkshire while working in domestic service and his father's family had lived in Beenham for a number of generations. The Burgess family lived in Stoneyfields, a development of council housing built in the village in the 1940s. Burgess attended the local primary school and lost his left eye in an accident when he was aged eight. He wore a glass eye which was said to give him a "staring" expression. He attended the Willink School in Burghfield Common and was described as "normal and average". A girl who knew him said he was "a difficult person to make friends with". He left school at fifteen and worked as a farm labourer. He enjoyed poaching and was said to be a skilled rabbit catcher. Shortly after Burgess's conviction, his family moved out of the village.

=== 2012 developments ===
Thirty-one years after Waddington's murder, in January 1998, it was announced that evidence would be re-examined with the hope of obtaining a DNA profile of her killer. The case was then reopened by the Thames Valley Police Major Crime Review Team in September 2010. Detailed forensic examination revealed that Burgess's DNA was found on Waddington's headband as well as a polythene fertiliser sack and a comb from the murder scene. Burgess was charged with her murder on 15 November 2011.

The five-week trial took place in 2012. Burgess, then aged 64, stated that at the time of Waddington's murder, he had been drinking ten or twelve pints of Guinness in the Six Bells pub every evening. He claimed that he had seen Waddington in the pub on the evening she was murdered and that she had left at about 22:30. He said he had left the pub fifteen minutes later and gone home. The court heard that, over the years, Burgess had confessed to fellow inmates and prison wardens that he had killed Waddington. When police had interviewed him about the murder in 1968, he had told them, "you will have to prove it".

At the trial, a former resident of Beenham told how Burgess, then aged fourteen, had followed her and attacked her one evening as she walked home from a phone box in January 1963. The trial also heard that Burgess had been released from prison on licence in May 1996, but he had failed to report to Leyhill Prison when required and had been involved in incidents of drunken and violent behaviour. He had then absconded for seventeen months before being arrested in a Portsmouth car park in February 1998 after carrying out an armed robbery at a Havant branch of Lloyds Bank. He was jailed for this offence for ten years in June 1998.

Burgess was found guilty of Waddington's murder on 20 July 2012, and three days later he was sentenced to 27 years' imprisonment. It was never established how the blood sample he gave in November 1968 had not been matched, but police suggested that it might have been incorrectly labelled or Burgess could have persuaded someone else to donate a sample in his place.

== Documentaries ==
On 7 June 2015, a series 3 episode of the Sky/Now TV documentary series Killer in My Village (also known as A Town & Country Murder) focused on the solving of the Waddington case.

On 12 November 2021, an episode of the BBC documentary series Expert Witness was aired that focused on the solving of the Waddington case. The episode was titled "60s DNA and Fibres Around the World".

== See also ==
- Murder of Kate Bushell – unsolved 1997 murder that was once linked to Burgess
- Murder of Claire Woolterton – another high-profile UK unsolved murder that was solved with DNA one year after Waddington's, in 2013
- Murder of Emily Salvini – a high-profile still-unsolved murder in Berkshire
