= Woolerton =

Woolerton is a surname. Notable people with the surname include:

- Doug Woolerton (born 1944), New Zealand politician

== See also ==
- Claire Woolterton (died 1981), American murder victim
- Wolterton Hall, a large country house in the ecclesiastical parish of Wickmere
