= Listed buildings in Hextable =

Civil Parish in Kent, England

Hextable is a village and civil parish in the Sevenoaks District of Kent, England. It contains two grade II listed buildings that are recorded in the National Heritage List for England.

This list is based on the information retrieved online from Historic England.

== Key ==
Grade	Criteria
I	Buildings that are of exceptional interest
II*	Particularly important buildings of more than special interest
II	Buildings that are of special interest

== Listing ==
Name	Grade	Location	Type	Completed (Note: The date given is the date used by Historic England as significant for the initial building or that of an important part in the structure's description.)	Date designated	Grid ref. (Note: The grid reference is based on the British national grid reference system, sometimes known as OSGB36, used by the Ordnance Survey.) Geo-coordinates	Notes	Entry number (Note: The "List Entry Number" is a unique number assigned to each listed building and scheduled monument by Historic England.)	Image	Wikidata
The Old Farmhouse	II	1, 2 and 3, College Road			22 October 1982	TQ5144270063; 51°24′34″N 0°10′34″E		1267520	Upload Photo	Q26557911
Gate, Gate Piers, Wall and Railings to Hextable House (part of North West Kent Teachers Training Centre)	II	College Road			22 October 1982	TQ5140270020; 51°24′32″N 0°10′32″E		1239127	Upload Photo	Q26532140

== See also ==
- Grade I listed buildings in Kent
- Grade II* listed buildings in Kent

== Sources ==
- Newman, John (2012) [1969], Kent: West and the Weald, The Buildings of England, New Haven and London: Yale University Press, ISBN 978-0-300-18509-6
