= Nick Lee (cricketer) =

English cricketer (born 1983)

Personal information
- Full name: Nicholas Trevor Lee
- Born: 16 October 1983 (age 43); Dartford, Kent, England
- Batting: Right-handed
- Bowling: Leg break

Domestic team information
- Years: Team
- 2011–2019: Suffolk
- 2014: Cambridge UCCE/MCCU
- 2015: Bedfordshire

Career statistics
Competition	First-class
Matches	13
Runs scored	490
Batting average	30.62
100s/50s	–/3
Top score	79*
Balls bowled	28
Wickets	1
Bowling average	24.00
5 wickets in innings	–
10 wickets in match	–
Best bowling	1/24
Catches/stumpings	2/–
- Source: Cricinfo, 12 July 2019

Nicholas Trevor Lee (born 16 October 1983) is an English former first-class cricketer. Lee was educated at Wilmington Grammar School for Boys, before going up to Anglia Ruskin University. While studying at Anglia Ruskin, he made his debut in first-class cricket for Cambridge UCCE against Warwickshire at Fenner's in 2004.

== Domestic career ==
Lee played first-class cricket for Cambridge until 2010, making a total of thirteen first-class appearances. He scored a total of 490 runs in these matches, at an average of 30.62 and a high score of 79 not out.

In addition to playing first-class cricket, Lee also played minor counties cricket for Suffolk from 2004–10, making 28 appearances in the Minor Counties Championship and twelve appearances in the MCCA Knockout Trophy. He later played minor counties cricket for Bedfordshire in 2015, making a single appearance in the Minor Counties Championship, two appearances in the MCCA Knockout Trophy, and four appearances in the Minor Counties T20.

== As a trainer ==
He was appointed the trainer for the Sri Lanka national cricket team in September 2016, having previously been the strength and conditioning coach at Sussex. In March 2020, the Bangladesh Cricket Board (BCB) appointed him as the strength and conditioning coach of the Bangladesh national cricket team on a three-year contract.
