= Hextable =

Village in Kent, England

Coordinates: 51.4113°N 0.1819°E

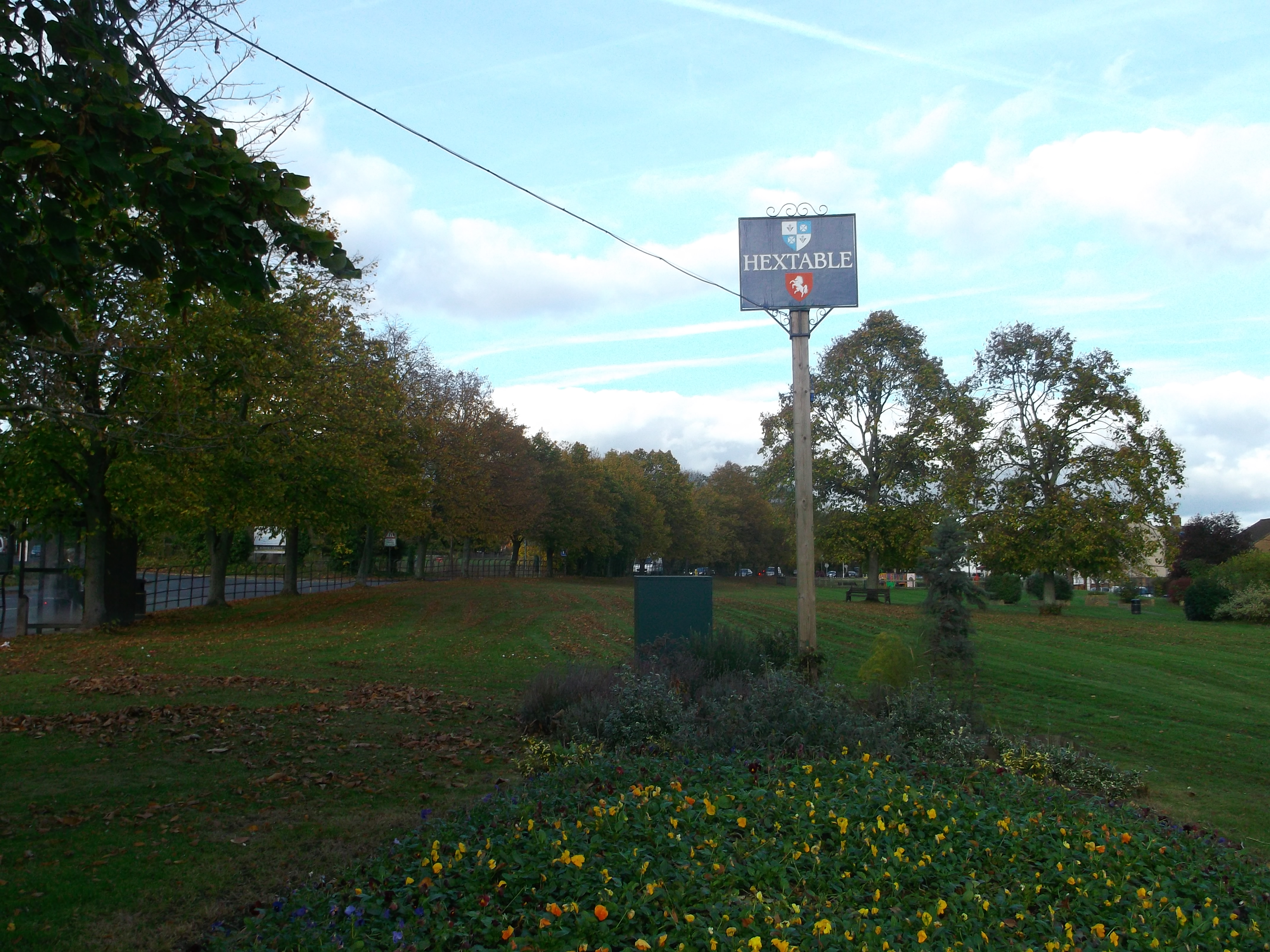
- Village sign

- Location within Kent
- Interactive map of Hextable
- Area: 1.98 km^{2} (0.76 sq mi)
- Population: 4,092 (2011)
  - Density: 2,067/km^{2} (5,350/sq mi)
- OS grid reference: TQ517703
  - London: 15 mi (24 km) WNW
- Civil parish: Hextable
- District: Sevenoaks
- Shire county: Kent
- Region: South East
- Country: England
- Sovereign state: United Kingdom
- Post town: SWANLEY
- Postcode district: BR8
- Dialling code: 01322
- Police: Kent
- Fire: Kent
- Ambulance: South East Coast
- UK Parliament: Sevenoaks
- Website: Hextable Parish Council

Hextable is a village and civil parish in the Sevenoaks District of Kent, England. It lies 2 miles (3.2 km) north of Swanley and 4 miles (6.4 km) south of Dartford.

== History ==
The origin of the village name goes back to Saxon times.

Its first documented appearance is in 1203 when the land is referred to as Hagestaple. Staple is from the Old English (O.E.) word "stapol" or boundary post. This makes perfect sense as the land was on the boundary of the Saxon settlements of Dartford, Bromley and Sutton at Hone. The word Hage is less clear. One theory is that it is descended from the O.E. word for high: "Hey". But the land on the Birchwood side of Hextable, where the post would have been, is not high, at least compared with nearby Rowhill and Swanley Village, and it is hard to see how Hage would have derived from Hey. The O.E. word "hage" meant a hedge, an enclosure or hawthorn, any of which could have been a means of uniquely delineating the boundary post in some way. The means by which Hagestaple became Hextable is, in contrast, well-documented:

- 13th century Hagestaple (1203 Roll of Rents)
- 14th century Hegestaple (1315 Bill of Sale of Highlands Manor of which Hegestaple was a part)
- 18th century Hackstaple (Various maps, including Hasted's History of Kent)
- 19th century Hackstable (1868 Ordnance Survey Map)
- 20th century Hextable (1895 OS map and many other documents).

The village grew up in late Victorian times with the selling off of Hextable Farm in 1870 (prior to this there were only three houses on the land that now comprises the village). It was originally set up as an area for the well-to-do to live in fine villas. Many of these villas are still standing, although two, Southbank and Newbank in College Road, were recently demolished to make way for flats and townhouses. The village's to-date most famous resident, Arthur Mee, known for the Children's Encyclopedia, lived in one such villa, St David's. His most famous utterance on his home village was the withering, although a little inaccurate, statement "Hextable has no history!"

The village quickly grew beyond being just a retreat for the upper middle class with the coming of the railway at nearby Swanley Junction coupled with the fertility of the land and the mild climate. Nurseries were established in the area with their produce being quickly sent to London via rail. Many of the names of these now long-gone nurseries still persist in road names such as Emerson and Panters. Emersons Avenue was built upon "The Rec", an old recreation ground left by a resident in Victorian times "for the use of the children of the village in perpetuity". It is consistent with the fast-changing nature of Hextable that perpetuity only lasted 100 years. The railway drove the expansion of the village in the 20th century as a convenient dormitory village for north-west Kent and London, and this is its main purpose today.

Much of the initial development of the village in the early 20th century was memorialised in a collection of photographs from a village resident, Christopher Casstine. He was an orphan brought up in the Homes For Little Boys (opened in Hextable by the Prince of Wales, the future Edward VII, in 1883 and still standing as Furness School) who stayed on in the village opening up a photography studio on the main road to Swanley. His photographs were used for many of the local postcards as well as for Mee's Children's Encyclopedia. His name lives on in the road Casstine Close.

The disorderly growth of the village explains the rather jumbled architecture that dominates the village. Hextable House, which was the only house in the village for much of its life, was bombed in the Second World War and wantonly torn down.

The Avenue of Limes which was planted in Elizabethan times as a magnificent entranceway to the House still remains linking New Barn Road and College Road. There has been some replanting of the trees in recent years, and its full beauty can now be appreciated for half of its length, although the remaining half should be visible in the near future. The gardens of the old House, as would have been seen in its final role as an agricultural college, are kept up with the aid of Lottery money at the Hextable Heritage Centre. The outskirts of Hextable largely comprise farmland, stables and small woodland areas.

The village has three churches:

- Anglican – St Peter's, part of the united benefice with St Paul, Swanley Village
- Methodist – part of the North Kent Circuit
- Pentecostal

Notably, there are no pubs within the village, due to restrictions placed by former landowners in the late 19th century, although there are pubs to be found on its woodland outskirts.

According to the census in 2001, Hextable has one of the highest percentage number of households with two or more cars in the country.

== Parish ==
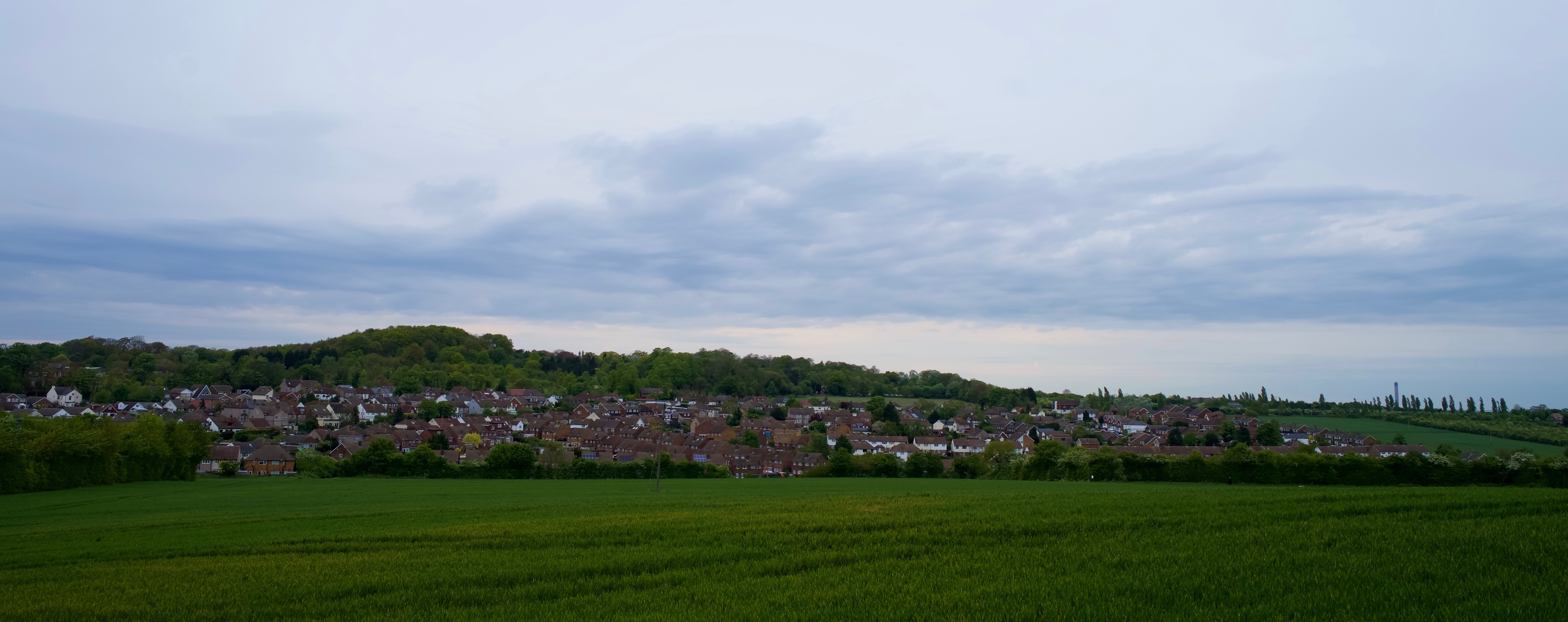
Panorama of Hextable

Following a three-year village campaign and the support of Sevenoaks District Council, the government agreed in December 2007 that Hextable could have its own parish council separate from Swanley Town Council. The new council came into being on 1 April 2008 and the first elections took place on 1 May. All of the Hextable Independent candidates won a seat on the Parish Council.

Two new housing developments of detached four- and five-bedroom houses have been built in the 1990s and 2000s, which has helped further improve the local housing stock.

With the support of Hextable Parish Council the village green in the heart of Hextable has been redeveloped with increased planting of trees and flowers and the modernisation of the children's play area. The village has a number of green areas including the village green, nine acres of Hextable Park, Hextable Gardens, The Avenue of Limes and Claremont Green.

The village has 4,747 residents with 1,800 homes. It is the fifth-largest parish out of 30 in the district and in the top 10% of villages in the country for size.

== Education ==
Annual training courses of the Youth Employment Service were held at Lamorbey Park in Kent. These courses were taught by Prof Alec Rodger from 1949. This college eventually became the Kent College for the Careers Service. This site became the College of Guidance Studies, funded by HEFCE, and later part of Canterbury Christ Church University College, being closed in August 2000.

== Transport ==
=== Rail ===
The nearest National Rail station is Swanley, located 2 miles away.

=== Buses ===
Hextable is served by Kent Country route 477 to Dartford and to Orpington via Swanley.

== Sport ==
AFC Unity formerly New Town Tigers F.C. is a family run junior football club founded in 2003 who play their games at Hextable Park at the top of Emersons Avenue.

== Nearby areas ==
Hextable borders Wilmington to the north, Hawley to the north east, Sutton at Hone to the east, Swanley Village to the south east, Swanley to the south and south west and Joyden's Wood to the west and north west.

== See also ==
- List of places of worship in Sevenoaks (district)
- Oasis Academy Hextable
- Listed buildings in Hextable
