= Listed buildings in Swanley =

Civil Parish in Kent, England

Swanley is a village and civil parish in the Sevenoaks District of Kent, England. It contains 18 grade II listed buildings that are recorded in the National Heritage List for England.

This list is based on the information retrieved online from Historic England.

== Key ==
Grade	Criteria
I	Buildings that are of exceptional interest
II*	Particularly important buildings of more than special interest
II	Buildings that are of special interest

== Listing ==
Name	Grade	Location	Type	Completed (Note: The date given is the date used by Historic England as significant for the initial building or that of an important part in the structure's description.)	Date designated	Grid ref. (Note: The grid reference is based on the British national grid reference system, sometimes known as OSGB36, used by the Ordnance Survey.) Geo-coordinates	Notes	Entry number (Note: The "List Entry Number" is a unique number assigned to each listed building and scheduled monument by Historic England.)	Image	Wikidata
Alice Dene	II	Beechenlea Lane			22 October 1982	TQ5280169462; 51°24′13″N 0°11′43″E		1273882	Upload Photo	Q26563589
Coal Duty Boundary Marker	II	Birchwood Lane			21 April 1986	TQ5030369903; 51°24′30″N 0°09′35″E		1359402	Upload Photo	Q26641657
Highlands Cottage	II	Highlands Hill			22 October 1982	TQ5251469588; 51°24′17″N 0°11′29″E		1239128	Upload Photo	Q26532141
Highlands Farmhouse	II	Highlands Hill			22 October 1982	TQ5237669630; 51°24′19″N 0°11′22″E		1222959	Upload Photo	Q26517251
Coal Taxpost (obelisk) on North Side of Railway 500 Yards West of Swanley Station	II	Orpington, St Mary Cray			29 June 1973	TQ5047168141; 51°23′33″N 0°09′41″E		1299013	Upload Photo	Q26586444
Church of Saint Paul	II	School Lane, Swanley Village			22 October 1982	TQ5296069757; 51°24′22″N 0°11′52″E		1222983	Church of Saint Paul More images	Q26517271
Lychgate to West of Church of Saint Paul	II	School Lane, Swanley Village			22 October 1982	TQ5292869759; 51°24′22″N 0°11′50″E		1239132	Upload Photo	Q26532145
Malabar	II	School Lane, Swanley Village			22 October 1982	TQ5289369914; 51°24′28″N 0°11′49″E		1222996	Upload Photo	Q26517284
Swanley War Memorial	II	St Mary's Road			5 November 2007	TQ5121568746; 51°23′51″N 0°10′20″E		1392300	Swanley War Memorial More images	Q26671528
Coach House to South East of the Old Place	II	Swanley Village Road			22 October 1982	TQ5292369521; 51°24′15″N 0°11′50″E		1273849	Upload Photo	Q26563558
Downs Cottages (nos 1, 2 and 3) and the Old Cafe	II	Swanley Village Road			22 October 1982	TQ5267469571; 51°24′17″N 0°11′37″E		1239134	Upload Photo	Q26532147
Elizabethan Cottage	II	Swanley Village Road			22 October 1982	TQ5292569557; 51°24′16″N 0°11′50″E		1223000	Upload Photo	Q26517288
Hillbrow	II	Swanley Village Road			22 October 1982	TQ5264869581; 51°24′17″N 0°11′36″E		1223066	Upload Photo	Q26517348
Numbers 1 and 2, White Cottages	II	1 and 2 White Cottages, Swanley Village Road			22 October 1982	TQ5267569600; 51°24′18″N 0°11′37″E		1273847	Upload Photo	Q26563556
Old College Cottage	II	1, 2 and 3, Swanley Village Road			22 October 1982	TQ5314069538; 51°24′15″N 0°12′01″E		1273848	Upload Photo	Q26563557
Stables to East of the Old Place	II	Swanley Village Road			22 October 1982	TQ5291969533; 51°24′15″N 0°11′50″E		1267475	Upload Photo	Q26557868
The Old Cottage	II	1, Swanley Village Road			22 October 1982	TQ5315269543; 51°24′15″N 0°12′02″E		1267488	Upload Photo	Q26557880
The Old Place	II	Swanley Village Road			22 October 1982	TQ5290569536; 51°24′15″N 0°11′49″E		1239135	Upload Photo	Q26532148

== See also ==
- Grade I listed buildings in Kent
- Grade II* listed buildings in Kent

== Sources ==
- Newman, John (2012) [1969], Kent: West and the Weald, The Buildings of England, New Haven and London: Yale University Press, ISBN 978-0-300-18509-6
