= Listed buildings in Wilmington, Kent =

Civil Parish in Kent, England

Wilmington is a village and civil parish in the Borough of Dartford of Kent, England. It contains one grade I and twelve grade II listed buildings that are recorded in the National Heritage List for England.

This list is based on the information retrieved online from Historic England.

== Key ==
Grade	Criteria
I	Buildings that are of exceptional interest
II*	Particularly important buildings of more than special interest
II	Buildings that are of special interest

== Listing ==
Name	Grade	Location	Type	Completed (Note: The date given is the date used by Historic England as significant for the initial building or that of an important part in the structure's description.)	Date designated	Grid ref. (Note: The grid reference is based on the British national grid reference system, sometimes known as OSGB36, used by the Ordnance Survey.) Geo-coordinates	Notes	Entry number (Note: The "List Entry Number" is a unique number assigned to each listed building and scheduled monument by Historic England.)	Image	Wikidata
Barn End House	II	Barn End Lane			1 August 1952	TQ5316871653; 51°25′24″N 0°12′06″E		1336477	Upload Photo	Q26620967
The Mount	II	Barn End Lane			1 June 1967	TQ5330471530; 51°25′19″N 0°12′13″E		1101776	Upload Photo	Q26395567
17, Church Hill	II	17, Church Hill			17 March 1982	TQ5410172755; 51°25′58″N 0°12′56″E		1085791	Upload Photo	Q26374302
Church of St Michael	I	Church Hill			1 June 1967	TQ5385672469; 51°25′49″N 0°12′43″E		1085789	Church of St Michael More images	Q17529665
Family Vault of George Russell Esquire of Wilmington Hall to South East of Church of St Michael	II	Church Hill			17 March 1982	TQ5386172455; 51°25′49″N 0°12′43″E		1347807	Upload Photo	Q26631235
Hulse Memorial in Churchyard to South West of Church of St Michael	II	Church Hill			17 March 1982	TQ5385372450; 51°25′49″N 0°12′42″E		1085790	Upload Photo	Q26374295
Monument to Edward Howe to North of Church of St Michael	II	Church Hill			17 March 1982	TQ5386372486; 51°25′50″N 0°12′43″E		1336478	Upload Photo	Q26620968
Tomb to William Hobbs in Churchyard to South East of Church of St Michael	II	Church Hill			17 March 1982	TQ5386672451; 51°25′49″N 0°12′43″E		1101744	Upload Photo	Q26395502
Wilmington House	II	Church Hill			1 June 1967	TQ5392972484; 51°25′50″N 0°12′46″E		1101733	Wilmington House More images	Q26395479
Broomfields	II	Common Lane, Da 7ba			22 April 2010	TQ5241472411; 51°25′49″N 0°11′28″E		1393756	Upload Photo	Q26672900
54, High Road	II	54, High Road			17 March 1982	TQ5340172107; 51°25′38″N 0°12′18″E		1336479	Upload Photo	Q26620969
The Retreat	II	157-165, High Road			23 September 1981	TQ5326772097; 51°25′38″N 0°12′12″E		1085792	Upload Photo	Q26374307
White Cottage	II	113, High Road			17 March 1982	TQ5340872080; 51°25′37″N 0°12′19″E		1083580	Upload Photo	Q26365792

== See also ==
- Grade I listed buildings in Kent
- Grade II* listed buildings in Kent

== Sources ==
- Newman, John (2012) [1969], Kent: West and the Weald, The Buildings of England, New Haven and London: Yale University Press, ISBN 978-0-300-18509-6
