= Oasis Academy Hextable =

Location
- Egerton Avenue; Hextable, Swanley, Kent, BR8 7LU; England
- Coordinates: 51°24′29″N 00°10′39″E

Information
- Type: Academy
- Closed: 2016
- Department for Education URN: 139946 Tables
- Ofsted: Reports
- Principal: Tina Bissett
- Gender: Coeducational
- Age: 11 to 18
- Enrolment: 125 (as of June 2015)
- Website: http://www.oasisacademyhextable.org/

Oasis Academy Hextable (formerly Hextable School) was a secondary school and sixth form with academy status, located in Hextable, Kent, England.

== History ==
The school was built in the early 1970s due to the rising number of pupils in Swanley, Dartford and surrounding villages.

The school converted to an academy in September 2013, and was sponsored by the Oasis Trust. In February 2015 it was announced that due to declining pupil numbers the school would formally close in 2016. Pupils in years 7, 8, 9 and 10 moved to other schools in September 2015 and no new pupils were admitted. Pupils currently in years 11 and 13 at the time were allowed to continue their studies at the school until September 2016.

However Kent County Council had stated that demand for secondary school places in the area would rise in the next few years, and they intend to retain the school site for future use as a secondary school.
