= Wilmington Academy =

Leigh Academy Wilmington
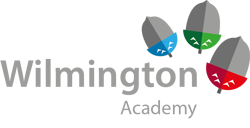

Location
- Common Lane, Wilmington; Dartford, Kent, DA2 7DR; England
- Coordinates: 51°25′41″N 0°11′38″E

Information
- Type: Academy
- Motto: Anything is possible; Believe in yourself; Don't just fly, soar.
- Established: 1 September 2010 (as an academy).
- Trust: Leigh Academies Trust
- Department for Education URN: 136205 Tables
- CEO: Simon Beamish
- Principal: Michael Gore
- Gender: Coeducational
- Age: 11 to 19
- Enrolment: 1225
- Houses: Minerva , Apollo , Jupiter
- Previous names: Wilmington Enterprise College, Wilmington Hall School (1972), Wilmington High School, Wilmington Technical School (1954).
- Website: http://www.wilmingtonacademy.org.uk

Leigh Academy Wilmington is a mixed secondary school located in Wilmington, Kent in the United Kingdom. It stands next to the site of Wilmington Hall.

As of 1 November 2018, Wilmington Academy had 1225 students, including 121 in Sixth Form, with 365 students in the Apollo college, 374 students in Minerva, and 365 students in Jupiter college.

== History ==
The location has been the site of several schools since shortly after World War II when Dartford County Technical School for Girls used Wilmington Manor, across the street, for first-year classes. In 1950, Wilmington Hall (built in 1734, demolished in 1970) became Dartford Technical School for Boys. Wilmington Technical School, formed in the early 1960s, was renamed Wilmington High School in 1975 when new buildings were built. In the mid-1980s, two schools were created on the site: Wilmington Hall School and Wilmington Grammar School for Boys.

In 2006, Wilmington Hall School was certified a Business and Enterprise Specialist College, and following a decision by students, parents, staff and governors was officially renamed Wilmington Enterprise College in September that year.

In April 2009, Jane Wheatley (headteacher of Dartford Grammar School for Girls) became the executive headteacher after the school was put onto special measures.

=== Leigh Academies Trust ===
On 1 September 2010, Wilmington Enterprise College became part of the Leigh Academies Trust and became Wilmington Academy.

As Wilmington Academy, the school has grown in population and success. Wilmington Academy initially split students into two colleges, Apollo and Minerva, to create a “small school” for supporting students academically and behaviourally. Growth in the school population led to the creation of a third college, Jupiter, in 2016. Students “value the benefits this system provides, stating that it is operated well to support the behaviour and academic performance of the pupils more effectively.”

In 2017, Wilmington Academy became an IB World School, offering the IB Careers Programme to Post-16 students. It was the first non-selective school in the local region to offer the International Baccalaureate. Principal Tracey Trusler said: "The school was not in a good place a while back, so to have repeatedly positive Ofsted inspections and now to become an IB World School is a massive success." This programme aims to develop young people into critically thinking, knowledgeable, caring citizens of the world, while ensuring strong academics and involvement in the local community.

Ofsted said of post 16 provision: "Sixth-form students are highly ambitious and clear about the plans for their future destinations, whether that is to go to university or apply for an apprenticeship. The school has provided effective advice and guidance to ensure that students are able to make the most appropriate choices for themselves."

Results have been improving every year since 2010, culminating in GCSE results from 2017: 60% A*-C in English and maths), and in Post 16: 52% A*-A, 57% A*-B, 79% A*-C, and 100% A*-E.

== Curriculum ==
Wilmington Academy offers “a broad and balanced curriculum that develops the skills and attributes needed for further education and employment. Academic and vocational courses, enhanced by technology, are delivered in a variety of settings to stimulate curiosity and encourage independent learning. It is [their] aim to develop healthy, responsible digital citizens, who are internationally-minded, respect cultural diversity and are able to take their place in an increasingly complex and ever-changing society.”

In Years 7 and 8, The Academy delivers the National Curriculum. Students use the IB MYP programme with the help of knowledge organisers. They study English language and literature, mathematics, Sciences, French, Spanish or German, History, Geography, Citizenship, Morals and Ethics, Art, Music, Drama, Technology, Physical Education and Computer studies. Reading recovery and numeracy skills are enhanced as appropriate.

In Years 9, 10, and 11, the curriculum continues to comprise compulsory and optional subjects including English Language, English Literature, Mathematics, Further Maths, Combined Science, History, Geography, Citizenship, Health and Social Care, Sport, Art, Music, Performing Arts, French, Spanish, Engineering, Horticulture, Product Design, Catering, Digital Photography, Creative, media, IT, Travel and Tourism and Business/Financial Studies. Students are entered for GCSEs and Btec qualifications.

For Post 16 provision, Wilmington Academy was awarded International Baccalaureate World School status in 2017 and is authorised to deliver the IB Career-related Programme. This is a flexible blend of IB Diplomas (academic qualifications equivalent to A levels) and Applied General qualifications (vocational qualifications). Students can elect to follow the IBCP, an academic pathway, a blended pathway or a vocational pathway. Students also follow the IB Core programme, which is designed to develop the skills and attributes that will set students apart from their peers when applying for university, higher apprenticeships and employment.

The Academy also forms part of LAT16 a collaboration between sister academies in the Dartford area.

== Notable alumni ==
- Keith Richards, rock musician (guitarist of the Rolling Stones)
- Jeffrey Jon Shaw, parasitologist, best known for his work on Leishmania
- Jas Singh, cricketer

== See also ==
- Wilmington Grammar School for Girls
- Kent County Council
- Leigh Technology Academy
