= Ruben Loftus-Cheek =

English footballer (born 1996)

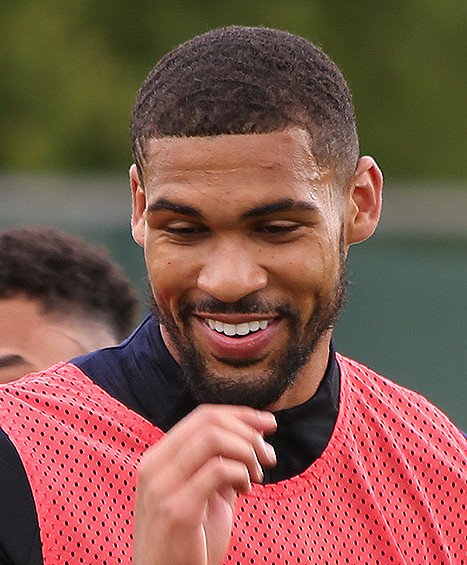
- Loftus-Cheek training with England at the 2018 FIFA World Cup

Personal information
- Full name: Ruben Ira Loftus-Cheek
- Date of birth: 23 January 1996 (age 30)
- Place of birth: Lewisham, London, England
- Height: 6 ft 3 in (1.91 m)
- Position: Midfielder

Team information
- Current team: AC Milan
- Number: 8

Youth career
- 2004–2014: Chelsea

Senior career*
Years	Team	Apps	(Gls)
2014–2023	Chelsea	103	(7)
2017–2018	→ Crystal Palace (loan)	24	(2)
2020–2021	→ Fulham (loan)	30	(1)
2023–	AC Milan	83	(9)

International career^{‡}
2011	England U16	2	(1)
2012–2013	England U17	8	(1)
2013–2015	England U19	13	(6)
2015–2017	England U21	17	(7)
2017–	England	11	(0)
- * Club domestic league appearances and goals as of 22:17, 25 October 2026 (UTC) ‡ National team caps and goals as of 23:10, 9 October 2025 (UTC)

Ruben Ira Loftus-Cheek (born 23 January 1996) is an English professional footballer who plays as a midfielder for Serie A club AC Milan and the England national team.

An academy graduate of Chelsea, Loftus-Cheek made his debut for the club in 2014 and went on to win the Premier League in 2016–17 and the UEFA Europa League in 2018–19, as well as spending time on loan with Crystal Palace in 2017–18 and Fulham in 2020–21.

A former England youth international, Loftus-Cheek made his debut for the senior team in 2017, going on to represent England at the 2018 FIFA World Cup.

== Early life ==
Loftus-Cheek was born in Lewisham, Greater London. He grew up in Swanley, Kent and attended High Firs Primary School and Orchards Academy. Loftus-Cheek is of Guyanese descent. He is the half-brother, on his father's side, of former professional footballers Carl and Leon Cort. His younger brother, Joe, is a semi-professional footballer.

As a youngster, Loftus-Cheek idolised French internationals Zinedine Zidane and Thierry Henry.

== Club career ==
=== Chelsea ===
Loftus-Cheek joined Chelsea at the age of eight. He impressed at the beginning of the 2011–12 season before picking up a hip injury, from which he recovered by the end of the season to make a substitute appearance in the 2012 FA Youth Cup final. In the 2012–13 season, Loftus-Cheek made 18 appearances for the U-18 squad and nine appearances for the U-21 squad, at the end of the season he was rewarded for his good form to travel with a place in the first-team squad for a post season friendly against Manchester City in May 2013. In 2013–14, Loftus-Cheek helped Chelsea win the FA Youth Cup and was a regular for the U21s as they won the Under-21 Premier League.

==== 2014–15 season ====
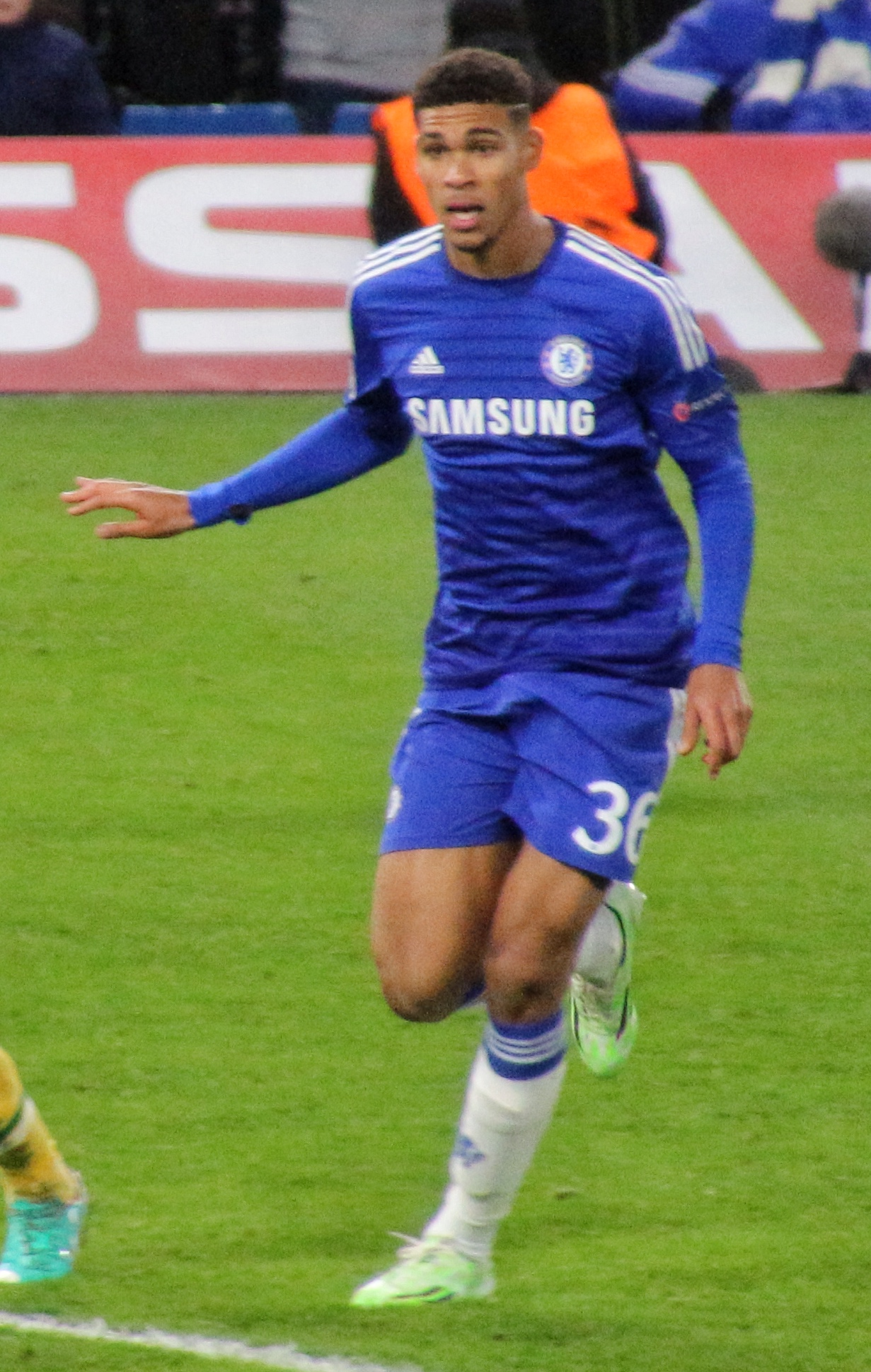
Loftus-Cheek playing for Chelsea in 2014

Loftus-Cheek made his senior debut for the club on 10 December 2014, replacing Cesc Fàbregas for the final 7 minutes of a UEFA Champions League group match against Sporting CP at Stamford Bridge; Chelsea won 3–1 having already come first in the group. He played his first Premier League match on 31 January 2015, coming on for Oscar in added time at the end of a 1–1 home draw against Manchester City.

On 3 February, Loftus-Cheek was promoted into José Mourinho's first-team squad alongside fellow teenager Izzy Brown.

On 13 April, Loftus-Cheek played for Chelsea in the final of the 2014–15 UEFA Youth League against Shakhtar Donetsk in Switzerland, which ended with a 3–2 victory for Chelsea. On 10 May 2015, Loftus-Cheek was awarded his first start against Liverpool at Stamford Bridge, playing 60 minutes and recording a 100% pass completion record, before being replaced by Nemanja Matić, in a match that ended in a 1–1 draw. Although Loftus-Cheek only made three league appearances out of the whole season, Mourinho stated that he would receive a winner's medal for his contributions this season.

==== 2015–16 season ====
On 29 August 2015, Loftus-Cheek made his first appearance coming off the bench against Crystal Palace as Chelsea suffered their first home defeat of the season. On 10 January 2016, Loftus-Cheek came on as a half-time substitute for Oscar in an FA Cup match against Scunthorpe United, and scored his first senior goal of his career in the 68th minute of the match, which Chelsea won 2–0. Excluding John Terry, he became the first player to have been at Chelsea since before the age of 15 and score for them since Carlton Cole 10 years and 3 days earlier.

On 29 February 2016, Loftus-Cheek signed a new five-year contract after impressing when given the chance in the first team. He scored his first league goal on 2 April, scoring the opener in a 4–0 win against Aston Villa away. After scoring his first league goal, Loftus-Cheek continued to be in the starting line-up in the following two matches against Swansea City and Manchester City.

==== 2016–17 season ====
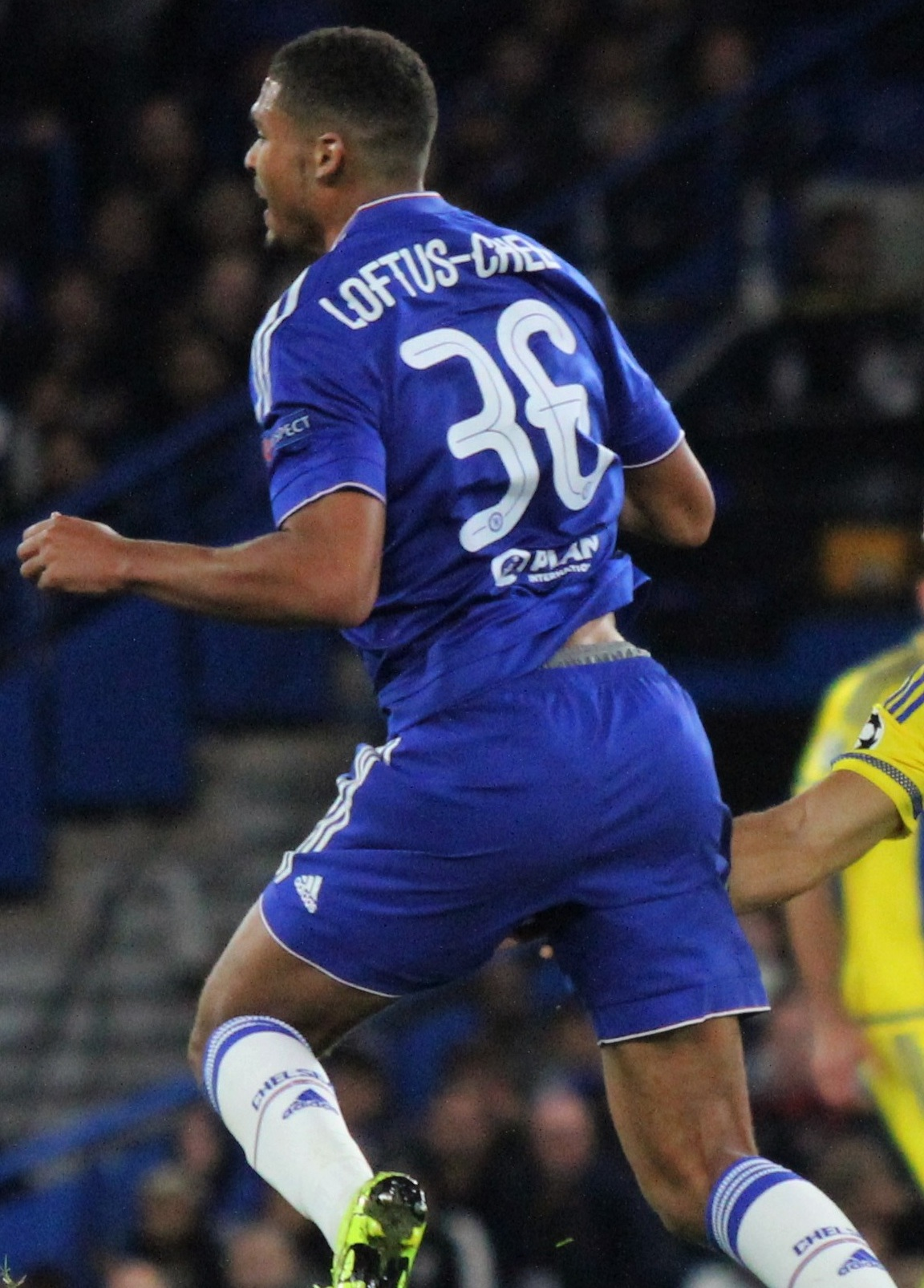
Loftus-Cheek playing for Chelsea in 2015

Under new manager, Antonio Conte, Loftus-Cheek was deployed as a striker, playing alongside Diego Costa during preseason. On 23 August 2016, Loftus-Cheek made his first appearance of the season, starting against Bristol Rovers in the Second round of the EFL Cup. He started the build-up of the first goal, as well as providing the assist to the third goal scored by Michy Batshuayi, which turned out to be the winner of a 3–2 victory. He received a standing ovation as he was coming-off for Oscar in the 82nd minute, and was also praised by Conte after the match.

==== 2017–18 season: Loan to Crystal Palace ====
On 12 July 2017, Loftus-Cheek joined fellow Premier League club Crystal Palace on a season-long loan. He made his debut on the opening day of the season during their 3–0 home defeat against Huddersfield Town, playing for the full 90 minutes. On 25 November 2017, Loftus-Cheek scored his first goal for the London side in a 2–1 victory over Stoke City. Following some impressive form, Loftus-Cheek was rewarded with a senior call-up by manager Gareth Southgate to the England squad for their fixtures against Germany and Brazil in November 2017.

==== 2018–19 season: Return from loan ====
For the 2018–19 season, Loftus-Cheek was included in the Chelsea first team. On 25 October 2018, he scored a hat-trick in a Europa League home match against BATE Borisov, which ended in a 3–1 win for Chelsea. Three days later, he scored his first league goal of the season away to Burnley. He scored in back-to-back league games in December, against Fulham in a 2–0 home win and Wolverhampton Wanderers in a 2–1 away loss. On 5 May, Loftus-Cheek scored the opener against Watford in a 3–0 home win that eventually secured Champions League football for the following season. In the next match, the second leg of the Europa League semi-final at home to Eintracht Frankfurt, he scored in a 1–1 draw, with Chelsea prevailing 4–3 on penalties. He was ruled out of the final, however, after he suffered an achilles injury during a charity match against New England Revolution.

==== 2019–20 season ====
On 6 July 2019, Loftus-Cheek agreed a new five-year contract with Chelsea, running until 2024. His injury at the end of the previous season ruled him out of action until June 2020, when the Premier League resumed after the coronavirus lockdown. He made his competitive return to action, starting Chelsea's first match back against Aston Villa, on 21 June.

==== 2020–21 season: Loan to Fulham ====
On 5 October 2020, Loftus-Cheek was loaned to Fulham for the remainder of the season. He made his club debut on 18 October 2020, in a 1–1 away draw against Sheffield United after he came off from the bench. On 22 November, Loftus-Cheek scored his first Premier League goal for the club in a 2–3 home defeat against Everton.

==== 2021–2023: Return from loan ====
Following his return from loan, Loftus-Cheek scored only one goal in all competitions in a 2–0 win over Crystal Palace in the 2021–22 FA Cup semi-finals.

=== AC Milan ===
On 30 June 2023, Loftus-Cheek joined Serie A club AC Milan, signing a contract until 2027 after 19 years as a Chelsea player. He made 155 appearances for Chelsea with a total of 13 goals before his transfer to the Italian side. On 27 September, he scored his first goal in a 3–1 away victory over Cagliari. On 15 February 2024, Loftus-Cheek scored twice for AC Milan in a 3–0 win at home against Rennes in the Europa League knockout round play-offs. On 22 February 2026, he suffered a fractured jaw after colliding with goalkeeper Edoardo Corvi during a 1–0 defeat against Parma.

== International career ==
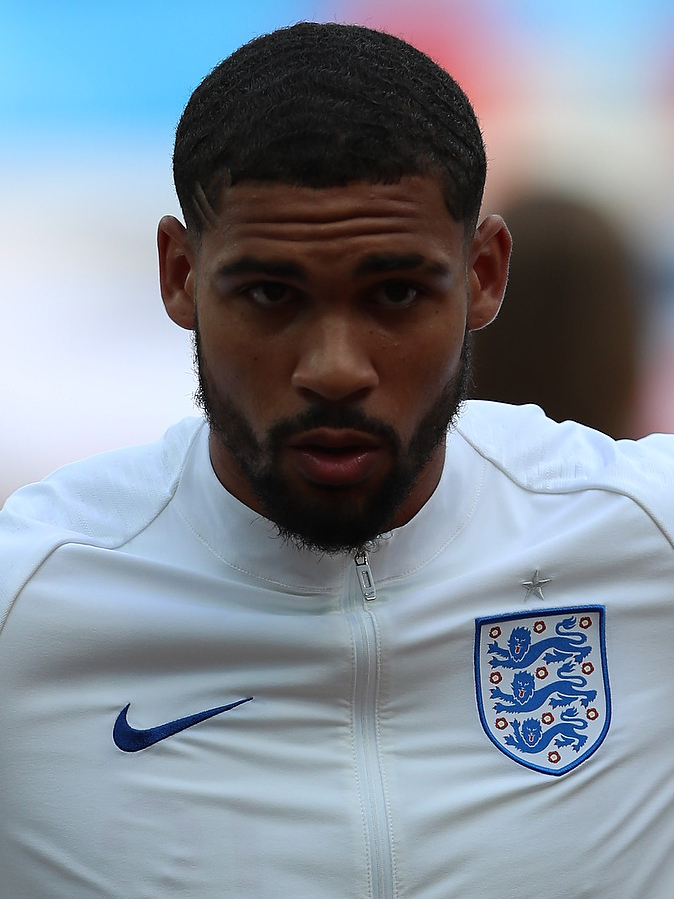
Loftus-Cheek lining up for England at the 2018 FIFA World Cup

Loftus-Cheek received his first call-up to the England senior squad in November 2017. Following his first senior call-up, he went onto make his England debut during their friendly fixture against Germany, in which he featured for the full 90 minutes, winning man of the match after an impressive performance in the 0–0 draw. On 16 May 2018, Loftus-Cheek was included in Gareth Southgate's 23-man squad for the 2018 FIFA World Cup. He came on as an 80th-minute substitute for Dele Alli in England's opening match, a 2–1 win over Tunisia on June eighteenth.

On 3 October 2025, Loftus-Cheek was called up by England manager Thomas Tuchel for matches against Wales and Latvia. He made his first England appearance in seven years when he came on as a substitute in the 70th minute for Declan Rice against Wales on 9 October.

== Style of play ==
After his first-team debut, Barney Ronay of The Guardian described Loftus-Cheek as an "intriguing" player of "long-striding grace" saying that with his "shielding, covering, deep-playmaking presence with a calmness in possession and a naturally telescopic reach" he would be a good fit for the senior England national team. Loftus-Cheek was compared to Germany great Michael Ballack by former Chelsea and England manager Glenn Hoddle, who said that: "He reminds me of Ballack – physically and the way he plays", and went on to say: "He gets in the box and he moves well off the ball." Following his first Premier League start of the 2015–16 season, Loftus-Cheek's Chelsea manager, José Mourinho, commented "He [Loftus-Cheek] is brilliant with the ball. He doesn't look 19 – he looks solid, stable and mature. But without the ball he doesn't look as good tactically." Liam Twomey of FourFourTwo described Loftus-Cheek as "an imposing box-to-box midfielder who combines a muscular 6ft 3in frame that enables him to dominate physically with startlingly polished technique and composure," also noting that "[h]e rarely makes a bad decision on the ball," and labelling him a "rare blend of natural physique and refined skill," whom he likened to Paul Pogba.

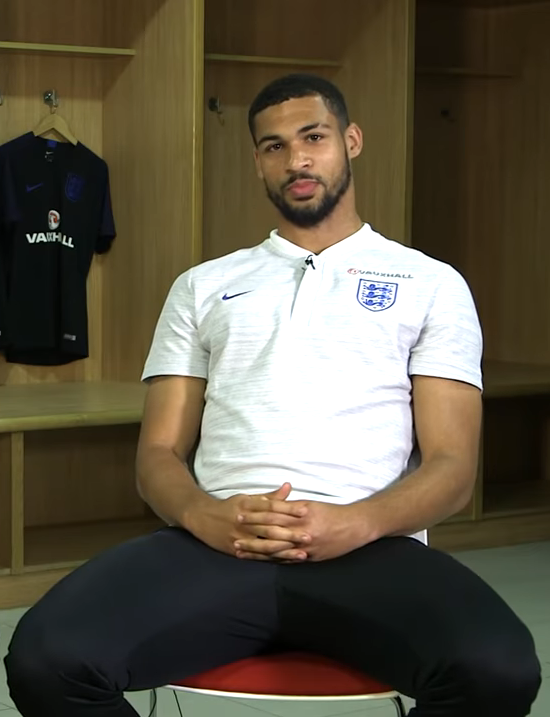
Loftus-Cheek during an interview in 2018

Throughout his career, Loftus-Cheek has been playing either as a central or attacking midfielder, but former Chelsea manager Antonio Conte stated that he sees Loftus-Cheek with the potential of a striker since he has "good technique, good personality and he is good one vs one." However, under Thomas Tuchel and Graham Potter, Loftus-Cheek has played in other positions such as centre-back and wing-back. With the player saying that he's "enjoyed the challenge from (playing at) right wing-back, to centre-back to the No 6 role in midfield" under Tuchel.

At Milan, managed by Stefano Pioli in his first season, Loftus-Cheek returned to playing in his preferred attacking role; as the team tended to switch back and forth between 4–3–3 and 4–2–3–1 formations, depending on whether they are in possession or not, Loftus-Cheek played as a mezzala, which is a box-to-box in Italian football terminology, and a trequartista, an attacking midfielder behind the main striker. He finished the season with 10 goals and 40 games, repeating his best record at Chelsea.

Despite a troubled second year with Milan under Paulo Fonseca and Sérgio Conceição, in which he rarely played due to recurring injuries and a loss of form, Loftus-Cheek still convinced the newly appointed manager Massimiliano Allegri of his qualities during pre-season and, therefore, was not sold in the 2025 summer transfer window. As Allegri picked the 3–5–2 as a starting formation, Loftus-Cheek became primarily a right mezzala in the middle-five, and also had a number of games as a supporting forward in the 3–5–1–1 variation of the formation.

== Other ventures ==
In late 2019, Loftus-Cheek starred in Burberry's festive campaign. While talking about modelling for the British fashion house's campaign, he said: "When the opportunity came knocking I couldn't turn the experience down. Being injured at the time, it was a good way to use some of my free time."

== Career statistics ==
=== Club ===
As of match played 25 October 2026

Appearances and goals by club, season and competition
Club	Season	League			National cup (Note: Includes FA Cup, Coppa Italia)		League cup (Note: Includes Football League/EFL Cup)		Europe		Other		Total	
Club	Season	Division	Apps	Goals	Apps	Goals	Apps	Goals	Apps	Goals	Apps	Goals	Apps	Goals
Chelsea	2014–15	Premier League	3	0	0	0	0	0	1 (Note: Appearance(s) in UEFA Champions League)	0	—		4	0
Chelsea	2015–16	Premier League	13	1	2	1	1	0	1	0	0	0	17	2
Chelsea	2016–17	Premier League	6	0	3	0	2	0	—		—		11	0
Chelsea	2018–19	Premier League	24	6	2	0	3	0	11 (Note: Appearances in UEFA Europa League)	4	0	0	40	10
Chelsea	2019–20	Premier League	7	0	2	0	0	0	0	0	0	0	9	0
Chelsea	2020–21	Premier League	1	0	—		0	0	0	0	—		1	0
Chelsea	2021–22	Premier League	24	0	5	1	3	0	8	0	0	0	40	1
Chelsea	2022–23	Premier League	25	0	0	0	1	0	7	0	—		33	0
Chelsea	Total		103	7	14	2	10	0	28	4	0	0	155	13
Crystal Palace (loan)	2017–18	Premier League	24	2	0	0	1	0	—		—		25	2
Fulham (loan)	2020–21	Premier League	30	1	2	0	—		—		—		32	1
AC Milan	2023–24	Serie A	29	6	1	0	—		10 (Note: Four appearances in UEFA Champions League, six appearances and four goals in UEFA Europa League)	4	—		40	10
AC Milan	2024–25	Serie A	19	0	2	0	—		5	0	1 (Note: Appearance in Supercoppa Italiana)	0	27	0
AC Milan	2025–26	Serie A	28	3	3	0	—		—		1	0	32	3
AC Milan	2026–27	Serie A	7	0	0	0	—		2	0	—		9	0
AC Milan	Total		83	9	6	0	—		17	4	2	0	108	13
Career total			240	19	22	2	11	0	45	8	2	0	320	29

=== International ===
Appearances and goals by national team and year
National team	Year	Apps	Goals
England	2017	2	0
England	2018	8	0
England	2019	0	0
England	2020	0	0
England	2021	0	0
England	2022	0	0
England	2023	0	0
England	2024	0	0
England	2025	1	0
Total		11	0

== Honours ==
Chelsea Youth

- FA Youth Cup: 2011–12, 2013–14
- Professional U21 Development League: 2013–14
- UEFA Youth League: 2014–15

Chelsea

- Premier League: 2016–17
- UEFA Europa League: 2018–19
- UEFA Super Cup: 2021
- FIFA Intercontinental Cup: 2022
- FA Cup runner-up: 2021–22
- EFL Cup runner-up: 2018–19, 2021–22

AC Milan

- Supercoppa Italiana: 2024–25

England U21

- Toulon Tournament: 2016

Individual

- Toulon Tournament Player of the Tournament: 2016
