= Wilmington Grammar School for Girls =

Wilmington Grammar School for Girls (WGSG)

Location
- Parsons Lane; Wilmington, Dartford, Kent, DA2 7BB; England; 51°25′51″N 0°11′37″E

Information
- Type: Grammar school; Academy
- Motto: "In pursuit of excellence."
- Established: 1958; 68 years ago
- Founder: Kent County Council
- Department for Education URN: 137250 Tables
- Ofsted: Reports
- Chair: John Webster
- Head teacher: Dave Fuller
- Gender: Girls in years 7-11, Girls & Boys in 6th form
- Age: 11 to 18
- Enrolment: 840
- Houses: Franklin, Bader, Hepworth and Singh (from March 2022)
- Colours: Blue and Maroon
- Website: http://www.gsgw.org.uk/

Wilmington Grammar School for Girls (WGSG), previously known as the Grammar School for Girls Wilmington, is a grammar school with academy status in Wilmington, Kent, England. The uniform consists of maroon blazers, maroon jumpers and skirts/black trousers, with blue shirts. The school is a member of the WHS partnership, so has a close relationship with the next-door Wilmington Grammar School for Boys, as well as Wilmington Academy and Oasis Academy Hextable.
