= Orchards Academy =

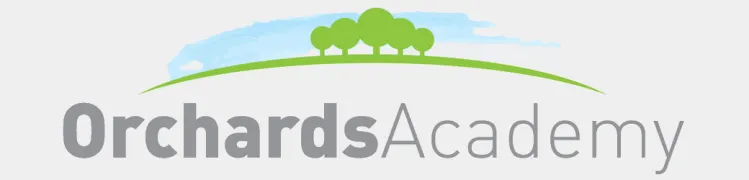
- Orchards Academy Logo

Location
- St Mary's Road; Swanley, Kent, BR8 7TE; England; 51.3968°N 0.1693°E

Information
- Type: Academy
- Department for Education URN: 136304 Tables
- Ofsted: Reports
- Chair: Georgia Jaddoo
- Headteacher: Hannah Carter
- Gender: Mixed
- Age: 11 to 16
- Enrolment: 623 as of September 2026
- Website: orchards-tkat.org

Orchards Academy (formerly Swanley Comprehensive School and then Swanley Technology College) is a mixed comprehensive secondary school in Swanley in South East England.

== History ==
The school was converted to academy status on 1 November 2010 and renamed Orchards Academy. It is part of the Kemnal Academies Trust, a multi-academy trust with several secondary and primary schools across England. It was previously a foundation school and Technology College administered by Kent County Council.

Orchards Academy offers GCSEs, BTECs and City and Guilds courses as programmes of study for pupils. The school had a sixth form for students aged 16 to 18 which closed in September 2021.

The school buildings were rebuilt in 2024-26.

== Academic performance and inspections ==
The school was judged inadequate by Ofsted in 2008, and good in 2012. As of 2026, the most recent inspection was in 2025, with an outcome of good.

== Notable former pupils ==
- Janice Hadlow — former controller BBC 2, author
- Crispian St. Peters — singer and guitarist
- Mark Steel — columnist and comedian
- Mike Stock — songwriter and record producer
- Ruben Loftus-Cheek — footballer for AC Milan and England
