= Wilmington Grammar School for Boys =

Location
- Common Lane; Wilmington, Dartford, Kent, DA2 7DA; England; 51°25′43″N 0°11′38″E

Information
- Type: Grammar school; Academy
- Motto: Forward Thinking – Traditional Values
- Established: 1950; 76 years ago
- Department for Education URN: 137227 Tables
- Ofsted: Reports
- Head teacher: Stuart Harrington
- Staff: 73
- Gender: Boys (Mixed Sixth Form)
- Age: 11 to 18
- Enrolment: 1174
- Houses: Attenborough, Brunel, Johnson, Keller, Mandela, Turing (Nov 2026)
- Colours: Blue, yellow
- Website: http://www.wgsb.co.uk

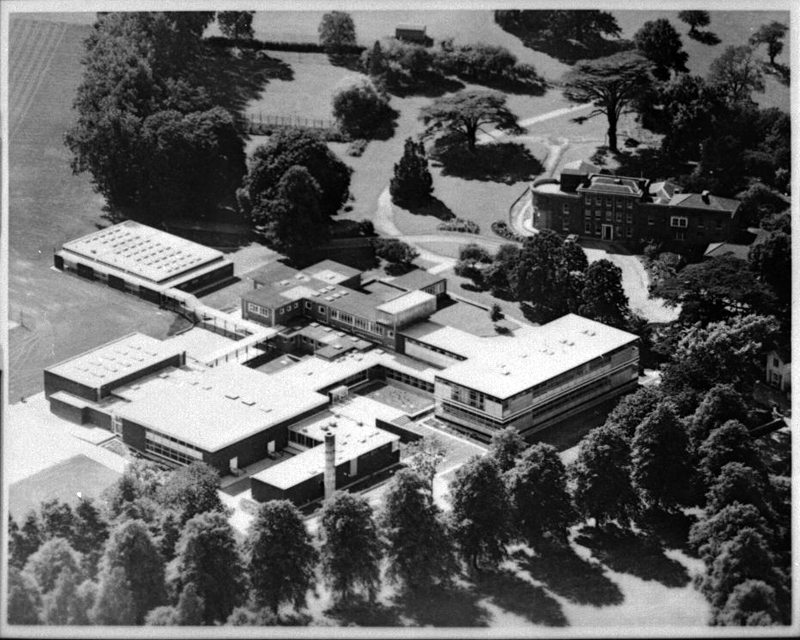
Birds-eye view of the school in 1964

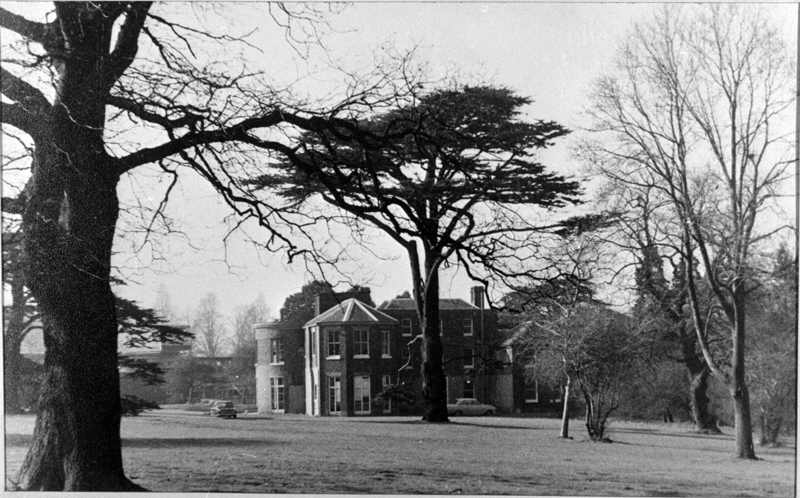
Old school building

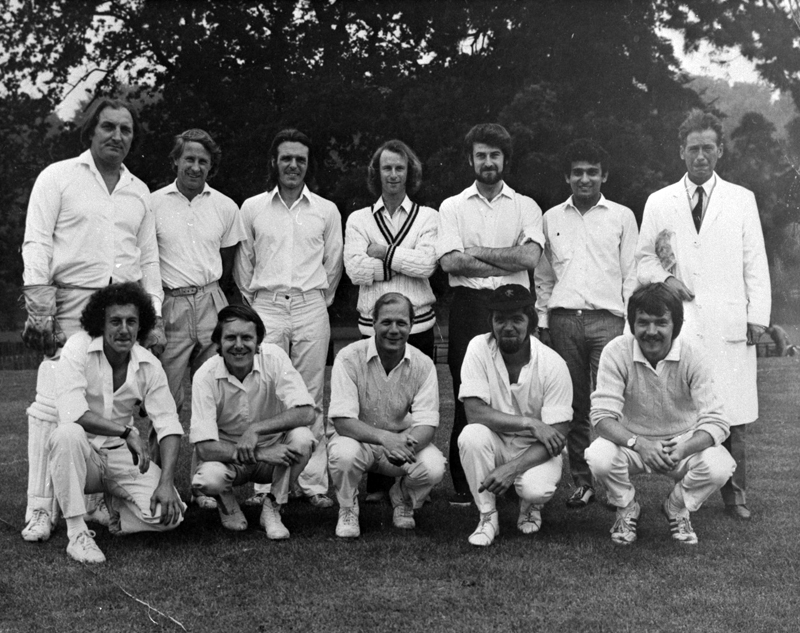
Staff cricket team 1972

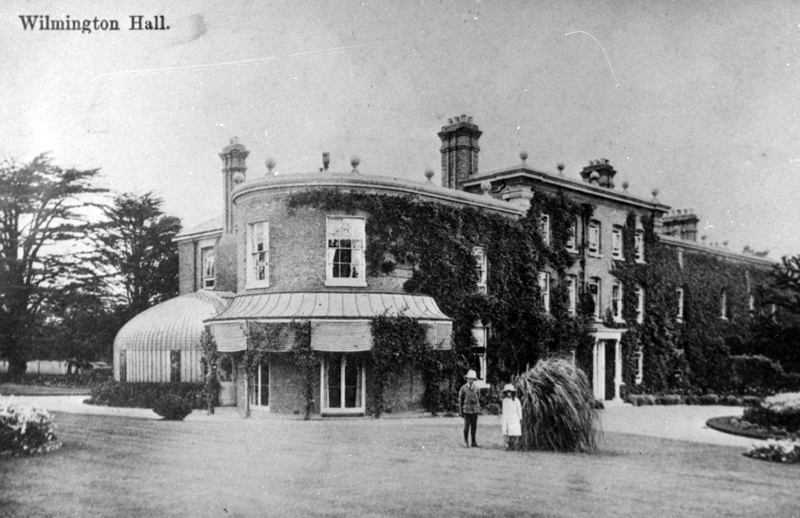
Wilmington Hall 1954

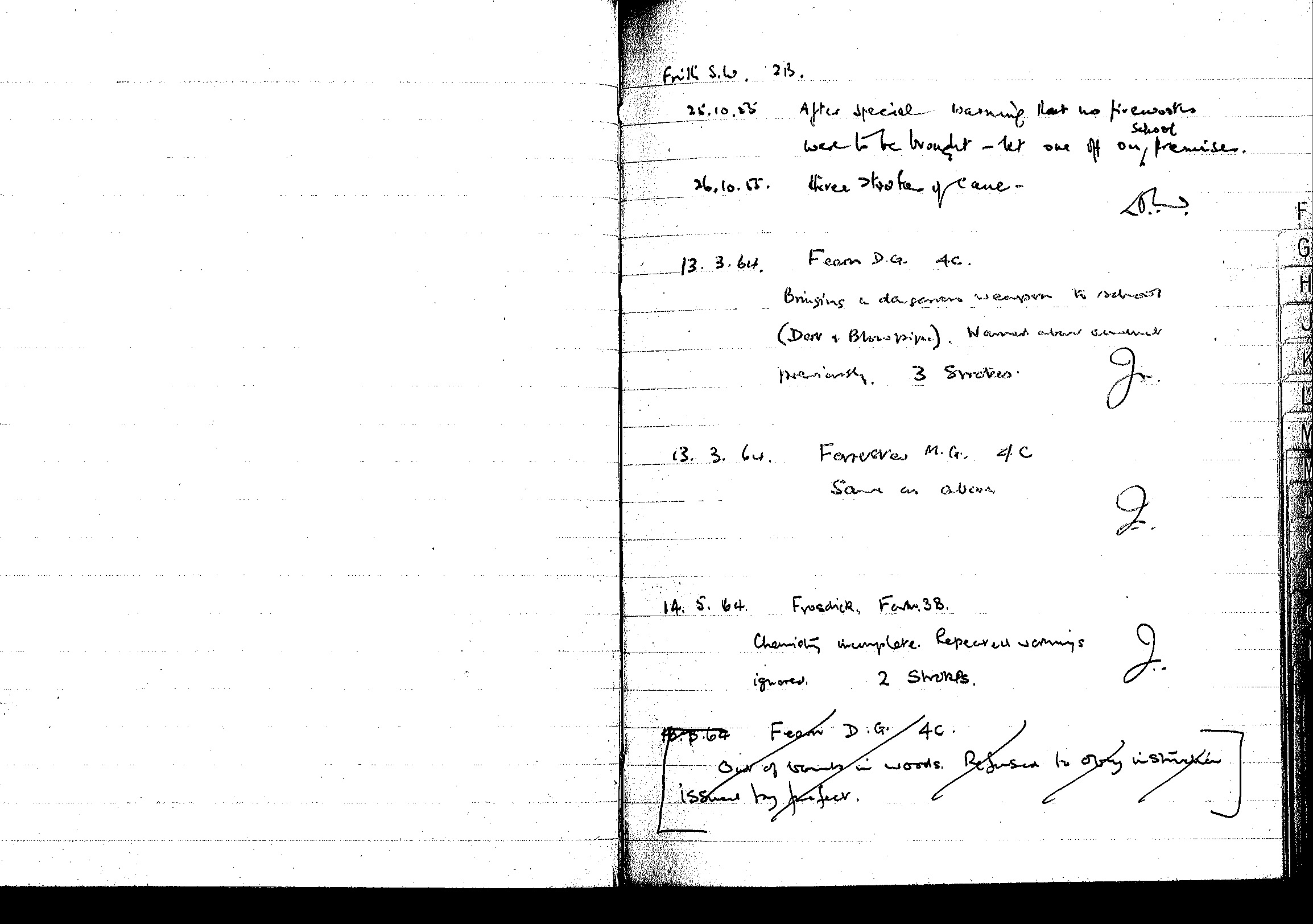
Book of Canings

Wilmington Grammar School for Boys (WGSB) is a selective grammar school with academy status in Wilmington, Kent.

From 1954 to 1982, the school was called Dartford Technical High School

The uniform consists of navy blue blazers, white shirts, grey or black trousers and different ties for each house within the school. Suits are worn in the sixth form. The school is situated directly alongside Wilmington Academy and has multiple bus services that also serve Dartford Grammar School for Girls, Dartford Grammar School, Wilmington Grammar School for Girls and Wilmington Academy.

== Departments ==
The school has the following departments: Science, Mathematics, Design & Technology, Business and Economics, Geography, History/Government and Politics, English, Art, Modern Languages (including French and Spanish), Media, Religious Education, PE and Music. As of 2021, drama is now a compulsory subject within Key Stage 3, however is optional at GCSE level.

== Notable pupils ==
- Paul Carr, writer, journalist and commentator
- Ben Thompson, footballer who plays as a midfielder for Bromley F.C.
- Ben Sheaf, footballer who plays as a midfielder for Coventry City F.C.
- Mackenzie Crook, actor (The Office, Pirates of the Caribbean: The Curse of the Black Pearl)
- Neal Hazel, criminologist and former Her Majesty's Deputy Chief Inspector of Probation for England and Wales
- Keith Richards, musician, The Rolling Stones
- Michael Swanton, an authority on Old English literature and the Anglo-Saxon period
- Nick Lee, cricketer
- Yusuf Mersin footballer who plays as a goalkeeper for Mickleover F.C.
- Albert Thomas Head of People, Virgin Atlantic Airways
- Mathew Matos Gillingwater, Social Media Celebrity

== STEM Racing ==
The technology department at WGSB competes in an international competition called STEM Racing which is where students form a team of 3–6 students and then design and build a car made from a block of wood or it is 3D printed (More details on STEM Racing page). The school has taken part in this competition since the 2007–2008 season, with numerous successes.

The team Redshift succeeded in the 2014 London & South-East England Regional Final and then came 3rd in the 2013 National Final at the ExCel Arena, London. This earned them the opportunity to become a collaboration team, meaning that they joined another team from around the globe – which was a team from Singapore. The team was renamed from Redshift to X-Shift, a merging of both teams' names since the Singapore team were called Team X-Treme. This meant that they took part in the 2013 World Finals held in Austin, Texas.

Another team called Turbocharged had taken part in the Bloodhound SSC class, which is the same as the F1 class but it is designing a car based around the Bloodhound SSC. The team succeeded in the regional final in the 2012–13 season and then won the national final, meaning that they were national champions and gained a new world-record time for their car racing down the track (this record was 0.587 seconds). In the 2013–14 season, the team entered again into the competition and was unsuccessful, but after lodging a complaint about other teams being illegal, they were able to move to the national finals as a wildcard. The team then proudly attended the national final and won it again, meaning that they are the only team that has ever become national champions twice.

For the 2015 Bloodhound SSC Class, a new team was formed called Vortex. The team consisted of three old members of Turbocharged, and a new member. Vortex did not succeed in the regionals but was selected as a wildcard to progress to the nationals. They had the fastest time, but this was considerably slower than previous years, as the rules had changed, forcing the 8-gram car up to 30 grams. The team used the same principle of golf balls to create a turbulent boundary layer, to increase the speed of the car. The team won the national finals.

== See also ==
- Wilmington Grammar School for Girls
