= Colin Campbell (murderer) =

British murderer (born 1947)

- Born: Colin Frederick Campbell; 16 September 1947 (age 79); India
- Occupation: Murderer
- Convictions: Murder, manslaughter on the grounds of diminished responsibility (Note: After his 2013 conviction for murder, the judge said that it had been wrong to downgrade his other conviction to manslaughter and should have remained a murder conviction)
- Penalty: Life imprisonment with a 24-year minimum term (for 2013 conviction)

Details
- Victims: 2

Colin Frederick Campbell (born 16 September 1947) is a British double murderer who in the early 1980s abducted two separate and unrelated women in West London and killed them in sexually motivated attacks. In 2013, 32 years after the event, Campbell was convicted of the high-profile unsolved murder of 17-year-old Claire Woolterton after a DNA match was found to him. He was already in prison for the 1984 killing of Deirdre Sainsbury, but had had his murder conviction in this case downgraded to manslaughter on the grounds of diminished responsibility in 1999 after he claimed that he had only killed her due to having an epileptic fit.

In an open prison and about to be released in the early 2010s, Campbell was finally apprehended for Woolterton's murder, which had led to one of the UK's biggest manhunts at the time and a large amount of press coverage due to it being a murder of a minor. The epilepsy experts who had helped Campbell win his appeal in the Sainsbury case accepted that epilepsy could not explain two violent and sexually motivated murders, and in sentencing the judge said that it had been wrong to downgrade his conviction to manslaughter in 1999. Detectives said that had he not been caught, Campbell would have potentially become a serial killer, a term usually used to describe a repeat killer who has killed at least three victims. (Note: A serial killer is most commonly defined as a person who kills three or more people for psychological gratification; reliable sources over the years agree. See, for example: "Serial killer". Segen's Medical Dictionary. 2012. Archived from the original on 11 August 2016 – via TheFreeDictionary.com. "A person who murders 3+ people over a period of > 30 days, with an inactive period between each murder, and whose motivation for killing is largely based on psychological gratification."; Holmes, Ronald M.; Holmes, Stephen T. (1998). Serial Murder (Second ed.). Sage. ISBN 978-0-7619-1367-2. Archived from the original on 14 May 2019. "Serial murder is the killing of three or more people over a period of more than 30 days, with a significant cooling-off period between the murders The baseline number of three victims appears to be most common among those who are the academic authorities in the field. The time frame also appears to be an agreed-upon component of the definition."; Petherick, Wayne (2005). Serial Crime: Theoretical and Practical Issues in Behavioral Profiling. Elsevier. p. 190. ISBN 9780080468549. Archived from the original on 2 September 2016. "Three killings seem to be required in the most popular operational definition of serial killing since they are enough to provide a pattern within the killings without being overly restrictive."; Flowers, R. Barri (2012). The Dynamics of Murder: Kill or Be Killed. CRC Press. p. 195. ISBN 9781439879740. Archived from the original on 1 September 2016. "In general, most experts on serial murder require that a minimum of three murders be committed at different times and usually different places for a person to qualify as a serial killer."; Schechter, Harold (2012). The A to Z Encyclopedia of Serial Killers. Simon & Schuster. p. 73. ISBN 9781439138854. Archived from the original on 1 September 2016. "Most experts seem to agree, however, that to qualify as a serial killer, an individual has to slay a minimum of three unrelated victims.") Campbell is imprisoned at HM Prison Woodhill.

The conviction of Campbell for Woolterton's murder was noted in the media for the decades-long gap between the murder and the killer being identified, and was also celebrated for being another successful case of DNA finally solving an infamous cold case in the UK following the recent solving of the murder of Yolande Waddington in 1966 using DNA.

== Killing of Deirdre Sainsbury ==
In December 1984, Campbell abducted 29-year-old Deirdre Sainsbury in his car as she hitchhiked along the South Circular Road in Roehampton in west London, before killing her and dumping her body on Denham golf course. Her body had been mutilated and she was found naked. A witness had seen Sainsbury get into Campbell's car and remembered the registration number, and the car was found to belong to Campbell. Police officers went to his home and found the murdered woman's missing clothing inside. After he was arrested he confessed to killing her after he had made sexual advances to her, but claimed he had killed her because he had suffered an epileptic fit. He claimed he had only mutilated her to make it look like a maniac had done it. However, at trial the jury did not believe his claims that an epileptic fit could explain such a brutal and sexually motivated murder, and found him guilty of murder and not manslaughter.

=== Murder conviction downgraded ===
In 1996 Campbell won an appeal against his conviction for the murder of Sainsbury, with his defence team having employed experts who claimed that Campbell could have murdered her due to an epileptic fit from being on the wrong medication. At a retrial in 1999, Campbell pled guilty to manslaughter on the grounds of diminished responsibility and this plea was accepted by the prosecution. The judge said that while the conclusion was that he had killed with diminished responsibility, Campbell still constituted a danger to the public and ordered him to return to prison, with release only being possible through the parole process. Having already served 13 years he was given a minimum tariff of 1 day. However, subsequent parole board hearings found that he was too dangerous to be released.

== Revelation of Claire Woolterton murder ==
In 2013, it materialised that Campbell had already murdered by the time he killed Sainsbury, when he was convicted of the 1981 murder of teenager Claire Woolterton, revealing he was a double killer and indicating that epilepsy was not the reason why he had murdered Sainsbury. By this time, Campbell had been downgraded to a Category D prison while serving his sentence for Sainsbury's killing, and was being openly allowed out into the public on licence for five days every month in preparation for a possible release.

Woolterton was 17 years old and was described as a "normal, happy girl". On the evening of Thursday 27 August 1981, she had left her work at an amusement arcade in west London to walk home, but never arrived. At 6:00 the next morning, a member of the public walking along Barry Avenue in Windsor heading towards the nearby train station spotted what he thought was a mannequin on the footpath, which turned out to be the body of Woolterton. The body was partially naked with multiple knife wounds and a cut to the throat. She had been sexually assaulted. Later in the day Woolterton's parents realised that their daughter had not returned home the previous night, and saw a news broadcast reporting that a girl's body had been found in Windsor. They contacted their local police force and discovered that the victim was their daughter.

Police opened a murder investigation immediately at the time, saying that they believed that she had been murdered elsewhere and dumped at the location by the murderer. This was indicated by the fact that the last known sighting of her was far away walking down the Uxbridge Road in Acton, yet she was found dead in Windsor. Two witnesses came forward to say they had seen a girl being bundled into a car that night on the Uxbridge Road, and the police theory was that, since she had been found on one side of a stone wall right next to the River Thames, her killer may have parked their car there in the darkness and dumped her body over the wall, thinking it would go into the river.

The lead detective publicly stated that the murderer was clearly a very sadistic kind of person, and was the kind of offender who could strike again (which turned out to be accurate as Campbell would kill again in the area in 1984). Tapings were taken from Woolterton's body in the hope that fibres might be found to help identify a suspect, although as DNA profiling was not yet invented as a form of evidence in the early 1980s, the significance of these tapings for DNA evidence was not known at the time. The investigation became one of the UK's biggest manhunts and quickly made the national news and saw a large amount of press coverage. However, no suspects were identified and the case eventually went cold.

In 2011 the case was reviewed by a team led by Pete Beirne, who had been a junior detective on the original murder inquiry. Specialist forensic scientist Edward Jarman was brought in to examine the evidence with modern forensic techniques, and the DNA profile of an unknown man was identified and extracted. When this DNA profile was uploaded onto the national DNA database, it was found that the DNA belonged to Colin Campbell. The likelihood of the DNA not belonging to him was a billion to one. Since Campbell had already been convicted of the very similar murder of Deirdre Sainsbury only three years later in 1984, lead detective Beirne said that he "immediately knew who he was" when the match was revealed to him. Like Sainsbury, Woolterton had disappeared from west London, with her body found a few miles away. The police had noted the large number of similarities between the murders at the time and believed they were linked, but they had little concrete evidence against Campbell.

=== Trial ===
At his trial in 2013, a now 66-year-old Campbell claimed he did not know Woolterton. This time he was not able to repeat the claim that he had only murdered because of his epilepsy, with the experts who had testified that epilepsy may have been a factor in his murder of Sainsbury saying that they did not accept that there was a possibility that epilepsy could explain a man murdering on two occasions. Instead he decided to defend himself by saying that although he did not remember doing so, he may have once walked into the amusement arcade and she may have sat on his knee, which is why his DNA had been found on her. However, the forensic scientists said that the type and location of the evidence meant that this was not a possibility, since the DNA found could not have come from the minimal contact Campbell described. Campbell's claims were rejected by the jury and he was found guilty of her murder in December 2013. He was sentenced to a minimum of 24 years imprisonment, meaning he will be at least 90 years old before he will be eligible for release.

== Reaction to second conviction ==
"Colin Campbell is a dangerous individual who cut short the lives of two young women in their primes and has never accepted any responsibility for his actions." — Statement released by the family of Deirdre Sainsbury after his conviction for Woolterton's murder, 2013

The judge made it clear to Campbell in his sentencing for Woolterton's murder that he would not get away this time with the defence that his epilepsy had caused him to murder. He also said that his conviction for Sainsbury's 1984 murder should not have been downgraded to manslaughter on the grounds of diminished responsibility in 1999, saying:

Had it been known in 1999 that you were responsible as well for the killing of Claire Woolterton, the prosecution would never have accepted your plea of diminished responsibility in relation to the killing of Deirdre Sainsbury. It is also unlikely that Dr Fenwick and Professor Fenton would have been able to support such a defence, given the content of Dr Fenwick’s report dated 5th November 2013 in which he said that if you were found to have killed Claire Woolterton "the fact that he had committed two similar crimes would significantly weaken the possibility that the factors that we determined about his epilepsy at Broadmoor Hospital could have played the central role that was suggested in the case of the Deirdre Sainsbury killing. If it is found that he was present and did carry out the earlier killing then this must raise questions about the significance of epilepsy in the second killing".

After Campbell's conviction for Woolterton's murder, detectives on the case said that it was lucky that Campbell had been caught after the Sainsbury murder, and that it had stopped a potential serial killer (a phrase usually used to describe a repeat killer who has killed at least three victims). They said it was likely he would have gone on to kill more victims.

The conviction for the Woolterton murder was noted in the media for the 32-year-gap between the murder and the killer being identified. It was also celebrated for being another successful case of DNA finally solving an infamous cold case, following the recent solving of the 1966 murder of Yolande Waddington using DNA.

== Imprisonment ==
As of 2015, Campbell was imprisoned at HM Prison Woodhill. In that year he wrote a letter to national prisoners newspaper Inside Time complaining that he was not allowed to buy his bedding from Argos because the prison authorities told him it was a fire risk. Campbell complained: "instead of constantly lying to us perhaps they should try setting an honest example for a change".

== In popular culture ==
Campbell and the solving of the Woolterton case continue to be the subject of various documentaries:

- In 2015, Campbell and the Woolterton case were the subject of an episode of the Sky Crime documentary series Killer in my Village, also known as A Town and Country Murder.
- In 2021, Campbell and the Woolterton case were the subject of an episode of the BBC documentary series Expert Witness.
- In 2022, Campbell was the subject of episode 9, season 7 of "Britain's Most Evil Killers".

== See also ==
- List of miscarriage of justice cases § United Kingdom
