= Swanley =

Town in Kent, England

Coordinates: 51.395°N 0.175°E

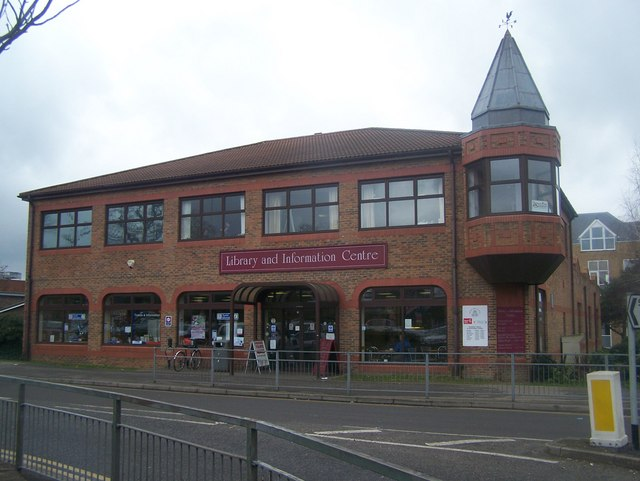
- Swanley Library and Information Centre

- Location within Kent
- Interactive map of Swanley
- Area: 7.15 km^{2} (2.76 sq mi)
- Population: 17,825 (2021)
  - Density: 2,493/km^{2} (6,460/sq mi)
- OS grid reference: TQ515685
  - London: 16 mi (26 km) NW
- Civil parish: Swanley
- District: Sevenoaks
- Shire county: Kent
- Region: South East
- Country: England
- Sovereign state: United Kingdom
- Post town: SWANLEY
- Postcode district: BR8
- Dialling code: 01322
- Police: Kent
- Fire: Kent
- Ambulance: South East Coast
- UK Parliament: Sevenoaks
- Website: Swanley Town Council

Swanley is a town and civil parish in the Sevenoaks District of Kent, England, 16 miles (26 km) southeast of central London, adjacent to the Greater London boundary and within the M25 motorway periphery. The population at the 2021 census was 17,826.

== History ==
In 1066, Swanley only consisted of a few cattle farms, surrounded in oak, sycamore and ash (Fraxinus) woodland. Because Swanley only consisted of a few homesteads, it was not mentioned in the Domesday Book.

There is a theory that the placename Swanley developed from the Saxon term 'Swine-ley', "Ley" meaning a clearing in the woods and "swine" meaning pigs. So it has been suggested that it was originally a Saxon pig farm or a stopping place for pigs on the way to the markets in Kent. This later developed into what we now know as Swanley.

In the sixth and seventh centuries, there were probably two homesteads. After the Norman Conquest, these portions of land were turned into manors, which were then often divided among the monks at Ghent Abbey and Bermondsey. The original settlement of the town of Swanley (as opposed to modern-day Swanley Village) was based around Birchwood which does get mention in later medieval and early modern documents.

The modern-day town developed from a crossroads with only three houses before the advent of the railway in 1861 to a town with a population of 16,588 (in 2001) in one and a half centuries. The newer settlement grew up around the railway junction and was originally named Swanley Junction, before becoming known as Swanley, and the original Swanley became Swanley Village, in the 1920s.

The arrival of the railway changed life in Swanley. The town became the location of Swanley Horticultural College which opened in 1887 and led to horticulture becoming the predominant industry. The college originally only catered for male students. Then in the early 1890s the first female students were admitted. Local Nurseries and florists' outlets blossomed, while casual farm labouring job opportunities on farms became in short supply. Some properties in Swanley still have apple and pear trees in their gardens from the original orchards. The college amalgamated with Wye College near Canterbury in 1945 under the governorship of Lord Northbourne.

=== Hospitals ===
Swanley became an attractive location for London doctors seeking a hospital site, to escape the smog of London. Three hospitals were established:

- the Kettlewell (or Alexandra) Hospital in 1885,
- Parkwood Hospital in 1893,
- White Oak Hospital in 1897.

The Kettlewell stood on the site of Asda's car park and was for poor patients from London who needed to recuperate after major surgery. The Parkwood Hospital was similarly used and White Oak was originally for children with eye diseases. During both World War I and World War II, Kettlewell and Parkwood were used as military hospitals, and Parkwood become part of the Sidcup Hospital for facial injuries. After 1948, and the creation of the National Health Service, these old London hospitals became redundant: – Kettlewell and White Oak closed in 1959 and Parkwood ceased to be a hospital in the early 1960s.

Currently, the gates of White Oak can still be seen opposite Swanley Police Station in London Road; the Roman Catholic Church in Bartholomew Way is on the site of Kettlewell's chapel; and Parkwood still exists in its entirety in Beechenlea Lane as Parkwood Hall School (a residential and day school).

=== Civil parish ===
The civil parish of Swanley was created in 1955 from neighbouring parishes of Farningham and Sutton at Hone reflecting the developments of the town and increase in population. In 1974 the parish council became a Town Council and included the settlements of Hextable, Swanley Village and the main town of Swanley. In 1988, Hextable was formed into a separate parish council.

Until 1974 it was a part of the Dartford Rural District.

== Geography ==
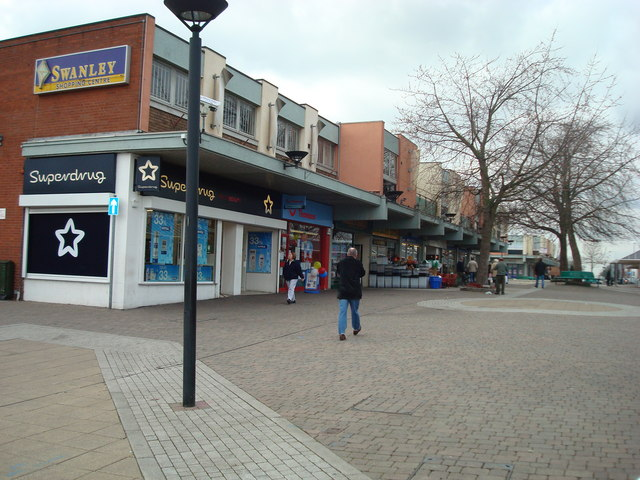
Swanley shopping centre in 2008

Within Kent, Swanley is adjacent to the parishes of Wilmington and Hextable to the north, Sutton-at-Hone and Hawley and Farningham to the east, and Eynsford and Crockenhill to the south. To the west there is a boundary with St Mary Cray in the London Borough of Bromley and Ruxley in the London Borough of Bexley.

The closest large towns are Bexleyheath, Dartford, Orpington and Sidcup.

The villages of Hextable Hockenden and Crockenhill use a Swanley address and are part of the Swanley urban area which has a total population of 23,489 with Hextable being earmarked for regeneration in the districts Swanley vision plan.

Being on the outskirts of south east London it is a convenient commuter town for people who work in the city. It keeps administrative and some traditional links with Sevenoaks and Kent but it is heavily associated with south east London due to the expansion of that area close to Swanley's borders. The majority of housing development took place from the post-war period to late 1980s. A new fire station was opened in 1962, and new post office two years later. Victorian houses and shops were demolished to create a new town centre. Its 1970s shopping centre was then re-modelled in the 1990s when the Asda supermarket was extended and is one of the larger Asda stores.

== Transport ==
=== Road ===
Swanley has easy access to the M25, M20 and the A20 being on the M25 Junction 3 interchange. The A2 is also north of the town.

=== Rail ===
Swanley railway station provides the town with Southeastern services to London Victoria via Bromley South, London Charing Cross (running non stop to London Bridge), Ashford International via Maidstone East and to Gillingham, as well as Thameslink services to London Blackfriars via Bromley South & Catford (which is extended to Welwyn Garden City during peak hours) and to Sevenoaks.

=== Bus ===
- 2 to Sevenoaks via Farningham, Eynsford, Shoreham & Otford. Monday to Saturday limited journeys, operated by GoBus.
- 233 to Eltham via Ruxley, Foots Cray, Sidcup & New Eltham. Operated by Go-Ahead London.
- 429 to Dartford via Joydens Wood & Wilmington or to West Kingsdown via Farningham. Monday to Saturday, operated by GoBus.
- 477 to Dartford via Hextable & Wilmington or to Orpington via Crockenhill & St Mary Cray. Monday to Saturday, operated by Kent Country and GoBus.

== Politics ==
Swanley has had a town council since 1974, owning some 150 acres of parks and recreation areas. The town is also administered by Sevenoaks District and Kent County Council. It is in the Sevenoaks parliamentary constituency with Laura Trott as its MP. Ryan Hayman is Swanley's CEO having been appointed in 2020

== Facilities ==
Local business sponsor the floral displays, while the Town Council maintains the grass verges and open spaces. The residential is a mix of private housing with social housing on two main estates at St Mary's and White Oak largely provided by West Kent Housing Association who have an office in Swanley Centre.

Swanley Park (which covers 60 acres) was previously known as New Barn park. It was previously New Barn Farm until various fields and orchards were bought by the Town Council to protect the green belt between Hextable and Swanley. There remains acknowledgement of the former use as a farm with a remaining avenue of fruit trees and new avenues of trees linking the car parks to the central play park, soft play centre, café, water park and boating lake. The town council has maintained old hedgerows and trees around the outside of the park and has created allotments and an environment area that is now managed by local volunteers. The park is home to Swanley Athletics Club and hosts a number of county cross country races and other events each year. Around one of the large fields is Swanley New Barn Model railway (running on 800 metres of track) operated by a group of volunteers throughout the summer.

A classical music and firework event – formerly called the '1812 Night' until the Russian invasion of Ukraine – is held on the Friday before the August bank holiday. Awarded worldwide recognition in 2018, the park has 400,000 visitors annually and is one of the most popular parks in the region.

== Places of worship ==
The Victorian St Mary the Virgin's Church is the Anglican parish church of Swanley. The Roman Catholic Church of the Holy Apostles was registered for worship in 1965, superseding a church hall used since 1931. Christ Church, originally Congregational and registered in 1904, is now part of the United Reformed Church. Also in the town are the Swanley Full Gospel Church (Assemblies of God), Elim Christian Centre (Elim Pentecostal), a Jehovah's Witnesses Kingdom Hall and a Brethren meeting room.

== Education ==
Orchards Academy is located close to the Town Centre and is the only Secondary School in the town. Other schools are located in the nearby towns of Sidcup, Dartford and Orpington within 5 miles of Swanley. There are five Primary Schools in Swanley, with others in the surrounding villages. The closest Further Education Colleges are North Kent College and London South East College.

== Media ==
Since the town is close to London, television signals are received from the Crystal Palace TV transmitter, placing Swanley in the BBC London and ITV London areas.

Swanley is served by both BBC Radio Kent and BBC Radio London. Other radio stations including Heart South, Gold and KMFM West Kent.

The local newspaper is Dartford & Swanley News Shopper which publishes on Wednesdays.

== Sport ==
Alma Swanley F.C. was a popular local side but went bankrupt. Swanley Furness F.C. was another team from the town, though many support nearby Crockenhill F.C. as it is more successful. Titan Tigers is a popular local youth football club, which was formerly run from and trained in Swanley, but now are based in Hextable, training on the grounds of Hextable School. Titan Tigers has also just expanded into adult football with an Under 21s and Veterans team. Hexley Rangers F.C. is a FA Charter Standard (Hextable/Swanley) community-based junior football club that play at Downsview Primary School. Petham Park Panthers is another FA Charter club.

The Swanley and District Athletic Club, founded in 1988, meets at New Barn Park. The club organises and helps run a number of annual running and cross-country events.

Swanley Sub Aqua Club meets at the White Oak swimming pool on Monday nights. SSAC is an independent club that has been training people to dive safely since 1967. Since 2009 it has been offering free PADI training for club members. The Leisure Centre was rebuilt in 2022, costing £20 million.

Sidcup and District Motor Cycle Club owns the Canada Heights international motocross circuit at Button Street, Swanley. The venue was first used in 1948 and was purchased by the club in the 1980s. A round of the ACU British Motocross Championship is run each year as well as open Motocross, Enduro and Trials events for all types of motorcycles.

The motor racing circuit Brands Hatch is situated five miles from Swanley.

Swanley now has a rugby union club formed in 2017. At the time of writing they have achieved 3 promotions in 3 years, most recently winning Metropolitan Kent 4.

Wasps RFC have indicated plans to build a 28,000 all seater stadium in Swanley (Crockenhill)

Boxing Stables amateur boxing club is based in the community hub St.Mary's road. They were previously based in Longfield The club is affiliated to England Boxing Southern Counties and is the only official boxing club in Swanley. Boxing stables had a fire at their previous club.

== Demography ==
The population of the civil parish at the 2021 census was 17,825.

== Notable people ==
- Janice Hadlow — former controller, BBC 2, went to school in Swanley
- Alan Knott — Kent and England cricketer, spent his childhood in Swanley
- Crispian St. Peters — singer and guitarist, born Robin Peter Smith in Swanley
- Mark Steel — columnist and comedian, born and grew up in Swanley
- Mike Stock — songwriter and record producer, came from Swanley
- James Dickson Innes (painter) — died in Swanley
- Ruben Loftus-Cheek — footballer for Chelsea and England, grew up in Swanley

== Twin town ==
Swanley is twinned with:

- Verrières-le-Buisson in France
- Fastiv in Ukraine

== See also ==
- List of places of worship in Sevenoaks (district)
- Listed buildings in Swanley
- Swanley Village
