= Margaret Pereira =

British forensic scientist (1928–2016)

Margaret Pereira CBE
- Born: 22 April 1928; Bexley, Kent
- Died: 22 December 2016 (aged 88)
- Known for: Forensic science
- Spouse: Arthur Wells (m. 1980)

Margaret Pereira CBE (22 April 1928 – 22 December 2016) was a British forensic scientist. Pereira, nicknamed "Miss Murder" and "Maggie of the Yard," worked on several forensic cases throughout her career. Most notably, her work helped convict John Bingham, 7th Earl of Lucan in the Lord Lucan nanny's murder case in 1974.

== Career ==
Pereira began working as a scientific assistant at the Metropolitan Police Forensic Science Laboratory at Hendon in 1947 and was the first woman on the scientific staff. She enrolled as a part-time student in biology at Chelsea Polytechnic and earned a Bachelor of Science degree from the University of London in 1953. Her degree qualification would have entitled her to have become an expert witness but it was believed, at the time, that women would not be able to withstand cross-examination in court. Instead, Pereira worked as an assistant to the laboratory director Lewis Charles Nickolls. In 1960, having impressed Nickolls with her ability to handle a hostile lawyer, Pereira was given her first case to work on; this meant she was able to give evidence in court but she faced prejudice as a female expert witness.

Pereira's research on serology led to the development of a new method in 1962 for investigating tiny bloodstains to determine the blood type of the subject; this is named the Nickolls and Pereira (N&P) method. In 1969, Pereira was promoted to principal scientific officer and, eight years later, she became director of the Home Counties Forensic Science Laboratory in Aldermaston, Berkshire. In 1982, Pereira was the first woman to be appointed controller of the Home Office Forensic Science Service, a role in which she reported directly to the Home Secretary. After retirement in 1988, she was president of the Forensic Science Society from 1991 to 1993.

== Cases ==
=== The murder of Mary Singh ===
Assa George Singh murdered his wife, Mary Singh, in 1964 and dumped her body in woodland near Shoreham in Kent. Pereira’s work for the prosecution included the examination of clothing and paper fragments.

=== The murder of Claire Josephs ===
In 1968, Pereira worked on the murder case of Claire Josephs who was found dead at her home in Bromley, Kent. There was no sign of forced entry to the property and much suspicion was placed on the victim's husband; however Pereira's analysis of the case led to the identification of Roger Payne as the murderer. Her examination in this case included studying saliva, clothing fibres, blood stains, and dog hairs.

=== Beenham murders ===
In 1966, Yolande Waddington, a 17-year-old female of the Berkshire village of Beenham, was murdered. Pereira was involved in this case as she tested and examined more than 200 blood samples from men ages 16–50 in Beenham, but none of them matched the killer. The following year, schoolgirls Jeanette Wigmore and Jacqueline Williams were murdered in the village. Blood smears on the boot of local resident David Burgess were matched by Pereira to Jeanette Wigmore and Burgess was found guilty of the two murders in 1967. Years later in 2012, David Burgess was convicted of the murder of Yolande Waddington.

=== Lord Lucan nanny's murder case ===
In 1975, Sandra Rivett, Lord Lucan's (John Bingham, 7th Earl of Lucan) nanny, was murdered. Pereira prepared for an inquest into Rivett's death, as well as the violent attack on Lady Lucan. Pereira examined blood smears and spatter on the walls and flooring and found a connection between the blood on the murder weapon and blood found in Lord Lucan's car, thus naming him responsible for the murder.

== Awards and honours ==
Pereira was appointed commander of the Order of the British Empire in 1985.

== Personal life ==
Pereira was born in Bexley, Kent to parents Harold and Margaret Elizabeth (born Hartigan). Her father was a telecommunications engineer, and her mother worked as a secretary. Pereira attended La Sainte Union Convent in Bexleyheath and Dartford County Grammar School for Girls and had originally aspired to become a doctor. However, due to the priority given to returning service personnel, she was not able to acquire a seat in medical school.

In 1980, she married an engineer named Arthur Wells. He was four years older than her and he survived her when she died in Portsmouth in 2016.
