= Dartford Grammar School for Girls =

Location
- Shepherds Lane; Dartford, Kent, DA1 2NT; England; 51.4434°N 0.20399°E

Information
- Type: Grammar school; Academy
- Established: 1904
- Local authority: Kent
- Trust: The Areté Trust
- Department for Education URN: 144100 Tables
- Ofsted: Reports
- Headteacher: Sharon Pritchard
- Gender: Girls
- Age: 11 to 18
- Enrolment: 1,000
- Houses: Chartwell; Hever; Ightham; Knole; Leeds; Penshurst
- Colours: Bottle green, black and white.
- Website: http://www.dartfordgrammargirls.kent.sch.uk/website/

Dartford Grammar School for Girls is a grammar school for girls in Dartford, Kent, England. Formerly known as Dartford County School, the school opened in 1904. It is the sister school of Dartford Grammar School for Boys.

== History ==
=== Early history ===
The Dartford County School opened unofficially on 3 October 1904 at a building on Essex Road. The school aimed to provide post-elementary education and to produce additional teachers to teach in new schools. The 75 students were girls aged 8–18; those under 13 were charged six guineas per term, while those 13 and older paid eight guineas per term. The official opening took place on 31 October 1904. During the first term, Amy Brett served as headmistress, overseeing two full-time staff and part-time visiting masters for Art and Singing.

By 1906 enrolment had increased to 113, and two hutted classrooms were built to accommodate the increasing numbers. The faculty had grown to five full-time staff, who taught English language and English literature, Latin, drawing and science, and physical education. In September 1906 the first hockey team was formed. In 1909, the first school magazine was written.

In 1910 there were eight forms and 11 staff. Because of the rapid expansion of the school, school trustees purchased 4 acres (1.6 ha) of land on Shepherds Lane and built a new structure, which cost £8,335. Rather than use the more popular and less expensive red brick favoured by many schools of the time, the school chose to clad the building in Kentish ragstone. The building included an assembly hall (now the canteen), a library, science laboratories, a dining room, and accommodation for the staff. It opened on 31 October 1912.

On 27 June 1913, the school participated in the annual inter-county school sports events for the first time. The following year a compulsory uniform was introduced for students, consisting of a red, green and white tie, cream blouses with Peter Pan collars and for summer a lighter cotton tunic. Hair had to be drawn back and tied with a black ribbon at the top of the head. Blue overalls were worn for science, and white for cookery.

By 1924 the school's student numbers had increased to 300. The building was expanded, adding five classrooms, a botany laboratory, a geography room, and a cloakroom. The assembly hall was enlarged and temporary huts were placed in the school grounds as dining facilities, which remained until 1937.

A scholarship endowment fund was established in 1925 to assist students continuing into higher education. By 1926 the school was listed as one of the top three secondary schools for girls in Kent, along with Bromley High School and Chatham Grammar School. By 1930 the number of pupils had risen to 400. Four years later, Erith Grammar School became an all-boys school and their 73 female students were sent to Dartford County School. Construction began in January 1937 for a new wing. New classrooms were completed by September 1937, and the new hall was finished the following year to replace the huts which had served as canteen and kitchen, though it was not officially opened until 1939.

In the late 1930s 50% of the students were fee-paying, while the others attended for free. The cost at this time was £4 per term. School legend states that during the Second World War teachers would sit on the top of the school buildings to watch for enemy aircraft. If something were spotted then the girls would go to the air raid shelter where lessons were taken and meals were eaten. Between 1939 and 1947, three bombs fell on the school, and between 1940 and 1942 40 girls and two teachers were evacuated to a small village near Exeter.

=== Butler Act ===
In 1944 the school was shaken by one of the first Doodlebugs, leading to the school examinations being cancelled. In the same year, the Butler Education Act abolished fees and introduced new admission agreements. The school was renamed in this year as Dartford County Grammar School for Girls.

In 1951 all staff were female and the number of pupils was to 730. In 1956, the school became the only school in the North West division that was legally entitled to bear a coat of arms. During 1958–1959, two additional classrooms and a craft room were added. The uniform was also adjusted to require all girls to change into indoor shoes upon arrival, wear a beret, and the wearing of 60-denier lisle stockings.

In 1972 construction began on Dartford West Secondary Girls School. The new school was built on the playing fields of the old one, leaving Dartford County with only one hockey pitch. Male staff were re-introduced in the 1970s. During that decade, the wearing of hats was abolished, as well as the requirement to change into indoor shoes. The uniform was also changed to its current bottle green colour. An open-air swimming pool was built in 1975.

A new headmistress, J. Hadman, took office in 1986. She renamed the houses and class groups, and introduced a new uniform. By 1989 the school had control of its own budget.

=== Grant-maintained status and foundation school ===
In 1991, the school ceased to be part of Kent Local Education Authority (LEA), and the following year became a grant-maintained school. In 1994, a new technology block opened and a two-storey temporary mobile was purchased to house the humanities department. In 1995, students at the school were among the first students nationwide to sit GCSEs covering the whole range of the UK's first National Curriculum. A 1997 OFSTED report described the school's curriculum as "unique" and the school environment as "stimulating and exciting". In 1998 another extension was completed, adding two science blocks, an IT/graphics room, an English suite, and two general classrooms. In 1999, the school was awarded "investor in people status".

In January 2001 a new headteacher, Jane Wheatley, was appointed. The school was awarded Beacon school status in September 2001 and the school achievement award in April. In 2003, the school became the first specialist science school in Kent. In 2004, the school's centenary year, it was awarded the Artsmark Gold award.

In September 2008 the school was re-accredited as a science specialist school. It was recognised as a high achieving school and awarded a second specialism in mathematics and computing.

In 2009, Wheatley was appointed Executive Headteacher of both DGGS and Wilmington Enterprise College, and Sharon Pritchard was made responsible for the daily running of the school. On 31 August 2011, Wheatley stepped down and Pritchard took over as Headteacher.

=== Academy ===
In June 2017 Dartford Grammar School for Girls converted to academy status. The school is now sponsored by The Areté Trust.

=== Headteachers ===
- Amy Acworth (née Brett): 1904–1928
- Edith M Freyer: began 1928
- Dr. Janes 1949–1971
- M. Waite: 1971–1986
- J. Hadman: 1986–1998
- C. Unsted: 1998–2000
- Jane Wheatley: 2001–2011
- Sharon Pritchard: 2011– present

== Curriculum ==
In September 2003, the school adopted a two-year Key Stage 3 programme, under which students can follow a more flexible curriculum over three years. The school is a specialist science school and has a second specialism in Maths and Computing. The school also received the ArtsMark Gold Award recognising its expertise in arts subjects. The school day consists of five one-hour lessons each day.

DGGS is one of Dartford's top performing state schools. In 2009 all students achieved A*-C grades in their GCSEs and the school was placed 11th in the county for A Level results.

In 2021, the school was ranked 5th in the country by The Telegraph in its list of top 100 schools based on GCSE examinations sat in 2019.

== Extra-curricular activities ==
The school organises study visits and exchanges to countries including Cambodia, China, France, Germany, the Netherlands and Spain.

There are also several extra-curricular clubs available for students, categorised as creativity, action, and service.

- Creativity includes dance clubs, an art club, a drama club, an origami club, school plays and concerts, and a school magazine committee, as well as musical groups such as a gospel choir and ukulele club.
- Action includes sports team practices, inter-house matches, swimming, trampolining, netball, and tennis, as well as the Duke of Edinburgh Award.
- Service includes a Christian Union, the yearbook committee, and the School Council.

== Notable former pupils ==
- Claire Clancy, chief executive of the National Assembly for Wales since 2007 (1969–76)
- Grace Clements Commonwealth Games medal winner
- Lynne Frostick, President of the Geological Society of London
- Laura Hamilton TV presenter (1998–2000)
- Sheila Hancock CBE, actress (1944–51)
- Anne Hudson FBA, professor emerita of Medieval English at the University of Oxford
- Tess Kingham, Labour MP for Gloucester 1997–2001 (1974–81)
- Margaret Pereira CBE, controller of the Home Office Forensic Science Service from 1982–8 (1939–46)
- Diana Quick, actress
- Carolyn Quinn, Radio 4 presenter (1972–79)
- Dame Helen Reeves, chief executive of the National Association of Victim Support Schemes from 1980 to 2005 (1956–63)

== Coat of Arms ==
Coat of arms of Dartford Grammar School for Girls
Notes Granted 20 June 1956. Crest On a wreath Argent and Vert, A pomme, thereon a fess wavy Argent charged with a bar wavy Azure; over all a horse as in the Arms. Escutcheon Vert, in front of a fess wavy Argent charged with two barrulets wavy Azure a horse rampant also argent; on a chief of the last between two open books Proper [edged Or, bound Gules] a pale Murrey charged with a torch Or.
