= Wilmington, Kent =

Coordinates: 51.4309°N 0.1876°E

Wilmington
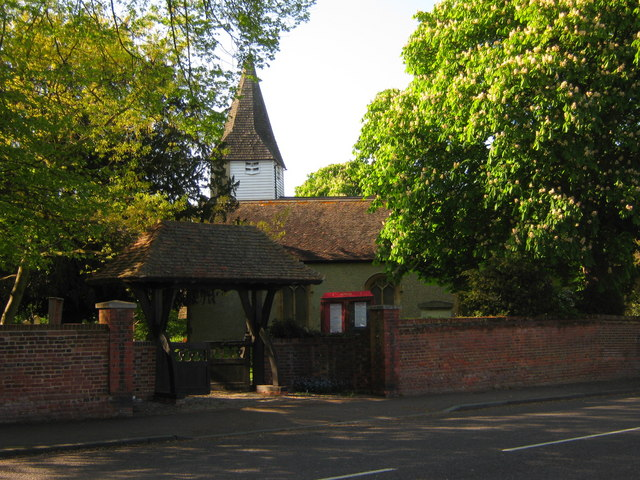
- St Michael and All Angels' Church

- Location within Kent
- Interactive map of Wilmington
- Area: 2.617 sq mi (6.78 km^{2})
- Population: 7,178 (2011)
  - Density: 2,743/sq mi (1,059/km^{2})
- OS grid reference: TQ520725
  - London: 15 mi (24 km) WNW
- Civil parish: Wilmington
- District: Dartford
- Shire county: Kent
- Region: South East
- Country: England
- Sovereign state: United Kingdom
- Post town: DARTFORD
- Postcode district: DA2
- Dialling code: 01322
- Police: Kent
- Fire: Kent
- Ambulance: South East Coast
- UK Parliament: Dartford
- Website: Wilmington Parish Council

Wilmington is a village and civil parish in the Borough of Dartford in Kent, England. It is located 2.7 miles south of Dartford, 3.5 miles north of Swanley and 4.3 miles south east of Bexleyheath, adjacent to the Kent border with Greater London.

== History ==
Wilmington is believed to have been the site of a major Celtic settlement and a place where the Cantii tribe fought Roman invaders near Leyton Cross and Joyden's Wood.

In the reign of Edward IV, a manor house in the village was a residence of the king-making Richard Neville, 16th Earl of Warwick. In the 19th century Wilmington was noted for being surrounded by gardens and cherry orchards.

In the 1970s the village was bisected by the A2 dual carriageway.

== Notable residents ==
Wilmington is perhaps most famous for being the childhood home of Mick Jagger, lead singer with the Rolling Stones. An earlier resident was Sir James Whitehead, whose family grave is in the village churchyard. He was Lord Mayor of London c.1888-9 and he lived for a number of years in the Manor, which was an early part of the girls' school. Two daughters, Leila and Florence, lived at Hazlewood in Rowhill and they founded the mission in Broad Lane.

== Transport ==
=== Rail ===
The nearest National Rail stations to Wilmington are Dartford, Bexley & Swanley.

=== Buses ===
- 429 to Dartford or to West Kingsdown via Joydens Wood, Swanley & Farningham. Monday to Saturday. Operated by Go-Coach.
- 477 to Dartford or to Orpington via Hextable, Swanley, Crockenhill & St Mary Cray. Monday to Saturday. Operated by Kent Country
- B12 to Erith via Bexley, Bexleyheath & Northumberland Heath or to Joydens Wood. Operated by Go Ahead London for London Buses.

== Sport ==
Wilmington Cricket Club has been a part of the village for over 100 years and has had many successes in the late 1970s and throughout the 1980s, playing at Lords twice and winning many competitions over the years. They currently play in the Kent Regional Cricket League and the home ground is in Oakfield Park.

Wilmington used to have a successful football club whose history, in the form of trophies and shields, is displayed in the Wilmington Pavilion on Oakfield Lane. In 2014, Richard Moore, a resident of Wilmington, started a new Wilmington FC team playing in the North Kent Sunday League. In their first season they won the League Three title as well as the League A cup.

== Schools ==
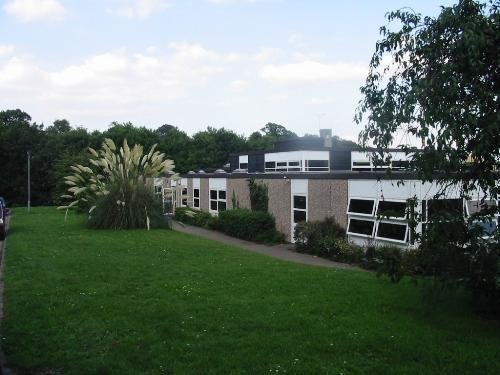
Wilmington Primary School

There are three secondary schools within the parish: Wilmington Grammar School for Boys (WGSB), whose students wear blue blazers, white shirts, grey trousers and different ties for each house within the school (these colours are red, green, white, black, yellow and purple, after the houses Telford, Stephenson, Darwin, Newton, Hawing, and Brunel ); Wilmington Grammar School for Girls (WGSG) formally The Grammar School for Girls Wilmington (GSGW), where the uniforms are maroon jumpers and skirts and a sky-blue revere collar blouse; and the mixed-sex Wilmington Academy (formerly Wilmington Hall), whose pupils wear black blazers.

Wilmington Academy and 'Wilmington Boys' are situated near Common Lane While 'Wilmington Girls' is situated on the nearby Parsons Lane. The academy was built in the mid-1970s on the site of Wilmington Hall Manor and is a specialist centre of excellence for both business and vocational courses. Wilmington Grammar School for Boys has engineering specialist status. Wilmington Grammar School for Girls specialises in mathematics and computing.

There is one primary school in the village, Wilmington Primary School, and another in Joydens Wood Estate; a nursery school is situated next to Wilmington Academy.

Three of the schools in the village (WGSB, WGSB, and Wilmington Primary) are part of the Endeavour Mat trust, which also includes Stone lodge, a school located in nearby Stone.

The Dartford Campus of North West Kent College is accessed via Oakfield Lane, Wilmington, but its grounds lie within Dartford.

== See also ==
- Listed buildings in Wilmington, Kent
