= Bradbury (surname) =

Bradbury is an English toponymic surname, derived from Bredbury in historic Cheshire, or sometimes from Bradbury in County Durham. Notable people with the surname include:

- Lady Joan Bradbury (née Leche) (c. 1465–1530)
- Baron Bradbury, a title in the Peerage of the United Kingdom, including three barons with the surname Bradbury
- Bill Bradbury (1949–2023), American politician and Oregon Secretary of State
- Bettina F. Bradbury, American soap opera writer
- Bettina Bradbury, Canadian author and academic
- Edward Kinder Bradbury (1881–1914), British soldier and recipient of the Victoria Cross
- Edward P. Bradbury, pen name of Michael Moorcock (born 1939), English writer
- Garrett Bradbury (born 1995), American football player
- Henry Bradbury (1829–1860), English writer
- Jack Bradbury (1914–2004), American animator and comic book artist
- Jason Bradbury (born 1969), British television presenter
- John Bradbury (naturalist) (1768–1823), Scottish botanist
- John Bradbury, 1st Baron Bradbury (1872–1950), British economist and public servant
- John Bradbury, 3rd Baron Bradbury (1940–2023), British peer, grandson of the 1st Baron
- John Bradbury (drummer) (1953–2015), English musician and record producer, best known as drummer with The Specials
- John Bradbury (footballer, born 1878) (1878–1942), English footballer
- Joshua B. Bradbury (1849–1918), American politician
- Julia Bradbury (born 1970), British television presenter
- Julie Bradbury (born 1967), English badminton player
- Lee Bradbury (born 1975), English professional football player
- Leone C. Bradbury (1905–1983), American artist
- Magnus Bradbury (born 1995), Scotland international rugby union player
- Malcolm Bradbury (1932–2000), British author and academic
- Margaret G. Bradbury (1927–2010), American ichthyologist
- Martyn Bradbury (born 1974), New Zealand television host and blogger
- Mike Bradbury (born 1969), American basketball coach
- Nicola Bradbury (born 1951), English literary critic and editor
- Norris Bradbury (1909–1997), American physicist, director of the Los Alamos National Laboratory
- Peter Bradbury (cricketer) (born 1950), English cricketer
- Randy Bradbury (born 1964), American punk rock musician
- Ray Bradbury (1920–2012), American science fiction and fantasy writer
- Robert Elwyn Bradbury (1929–1969), British social anthropologist
- Steven Bradbury (speed skater) (born 1973), Australian short-track speed skater
- Steven G. Bradbury (born 1958), American lawyer
- Stephen Bradbury (artist) (born 1954), British illustrator and painter
- William Bradbury (disambiguation), several people

== See also ==
- William Bradbery, British watercress pioneer, 1808
