= John Bradbury =

John Bradbury may refer to:

- John Bradbury (naturalist) (1768–1823), Scottish botanist
- John Bradbury, 1st Baron Bradbury (1872–1950), British economist and public servant
- John Bradbury, 2nd Baron Bradbury (1914–1994), British peer
- John Bradbury, 3rd Baron Bradbury (1940–2023), British peer, grandson of the 1st Baron
- John Bradbury (drummer) (1953–2015), English drummer with The Specials
- John Bradbury (footballer, born 1878) (1878–1942), English footballer
- John Bradbury (Australian footballer) (1941–2020), Australian rules footballer
- John Buckley Bradbury (1841–1930), English medical doctor and professor of medicine
- alternate name of Jack Bradbury (1914–2004), American animator and comic book artist
