= Northfleet =

Town in Kent, England

Coordinates: 51.44°N 0.34°E

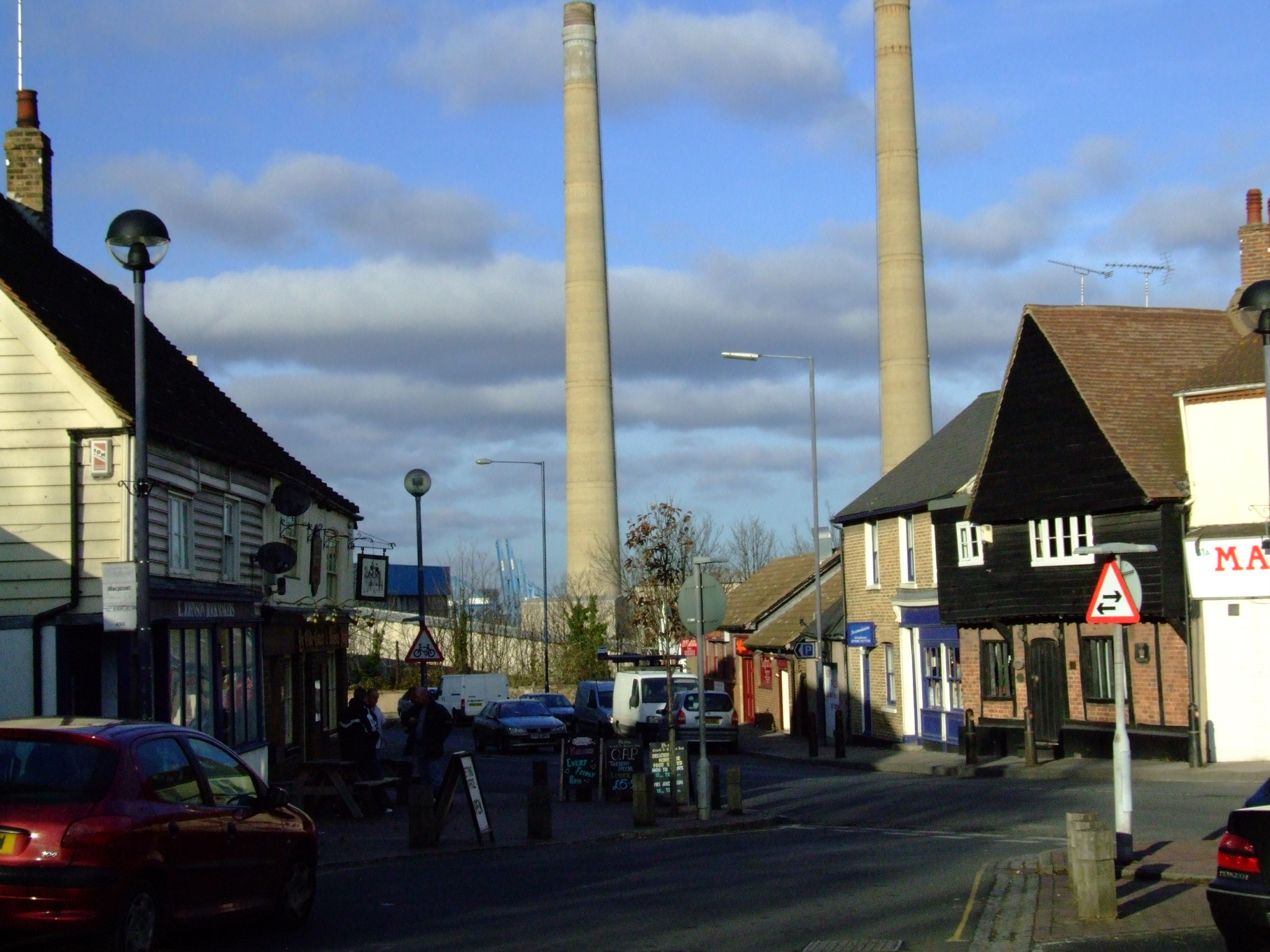
- Northfleet Hill dominated by the now-demolished cement plant chimneys.

- Location within Kent
- Population: 29,900 (2021 census)
- OS grid reference: TQ6274
- District: Gravesham
- Shire county: Kent
- Region: South East
- Country: England
- Sovereign state: United Kingdom
- Post town: Gravesend
- Postcode district: DA11
- Dialling code: 01474
- Police: Kent
- Fire: Kent
- Ambulance: South East Coast
- UK Parliament: Gravesham

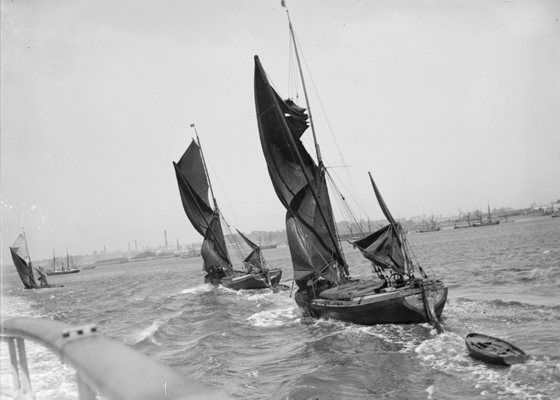
Thames sailing barges off Northfleet, 1898.

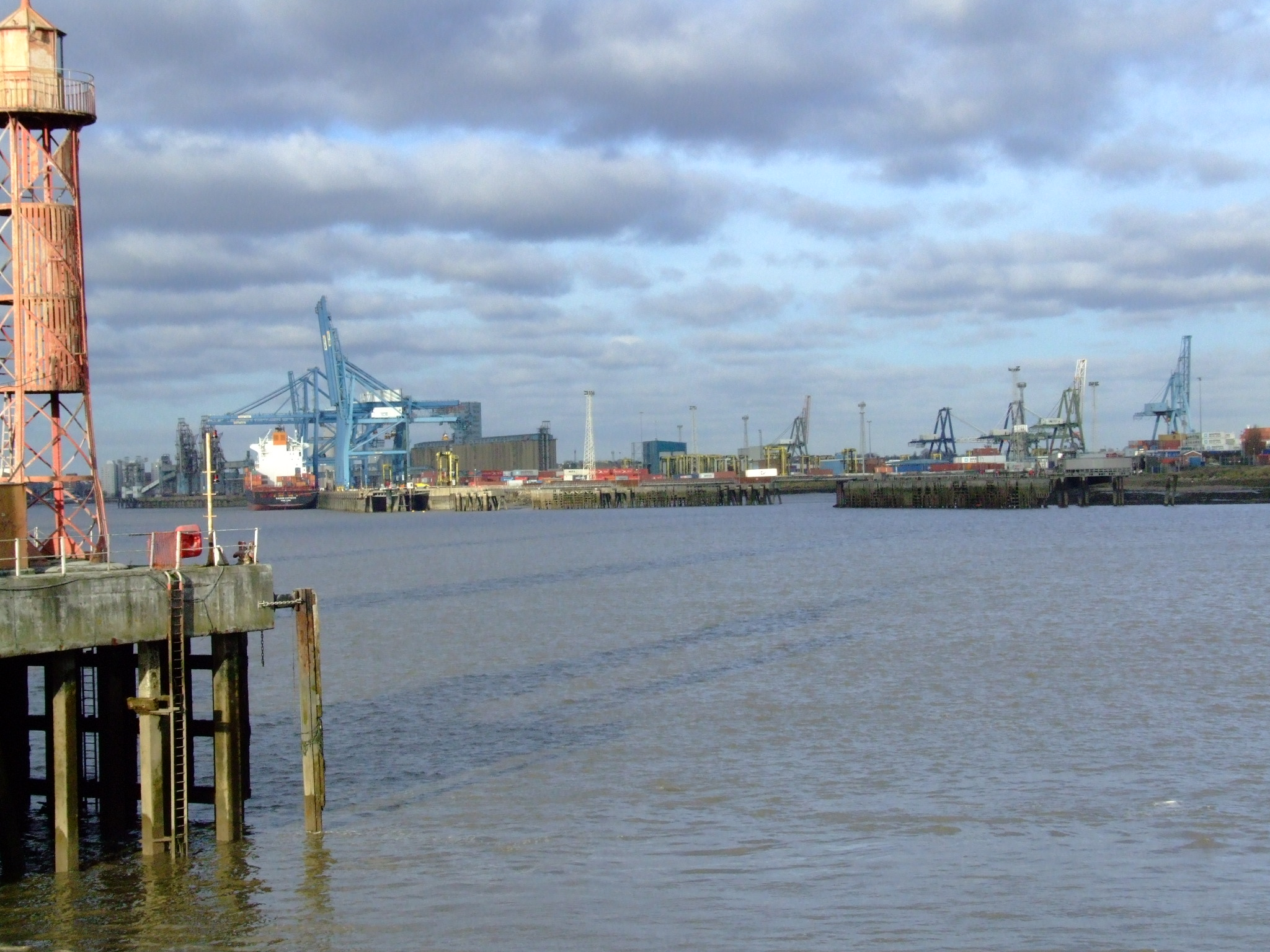
Looking up Northfleet Hope from The Shore.

Northfleet is a town in the borough of Gravesham in Kent, England. It is located immediately west of Gravesend, and on the border with the Borough of Dartford. Northfleet has its own railway station on the North Kent Line, just east of Ebbsfleet International railway station on the High Speed 1 line. According to the 2021 census, Northfleet has a population of 29,900 (rounded to the nearest 100).

== Area ==
Northfleet's name is derived from being situated on the northern reach of what was once called the River Fleet, today known as the Ebbsfleet River. There is a village at the other end of the river named Southfleet.

Northfleet has been the site of a settlement, adjacent to Gravesend since Roman times. It was known as Fleote by the Saxons c. 600 AD, Flyote c. 900 AD, and Flete c. 1000 AD. It was recorded as Norfluet in the Domesday Book of 1086.

A battle took place during the Civil War at the stone bridge over the Ebbsfleet river.

Northfleet became a town in 1874 with Northfleet Urban District Council being established c. 1894. In 1974 it was merged with the adjacent Borough of Gravesend. The first council offices were off the Hill, but the council then moved to Northfleet House which is now a nursing home for the elderly.

Northfleet House was the home of Thomas Sturge, owner of a cement works.

Northfleet was in the lathe of Aylesford and hundred of Toltingtrough.

Romans lived in the area now known as Springhead, which they called Vagniacae. Springhead, the source of the Ebbsfleet River, was the first site in Britain where watercress was grown commercially in the early 19th century.

Watling Street, a Roman road which forms the basis of the A2 from London to Dover, bisects the area.

== History ==
=== Rosherville Gardens ===
In 1815 the first steamboat started plying between Gravesend, Kent, and London, an event which was to bring much prosperity to the area. The number of visitors steadily increased, and in the course of the next ten years several new and rival steam packets were started. The regular service led entrepreneurs to establish amenities for the entertainment of visitors, one of which was Rosherville Gardens.

George Jones laid out the gardens in 1837 in one of the disused chalk pits. Their full title was the 'Kent Zoological and Botanical Gardens Institution'. They occupied an area in what was to become Rosherville New Town (see below).

Robert Hiscock, in his A History of Gravesend (Phillimore, 1976) describes them thus:

They were a place of surpassing beauty and a favourite resort of Londoners. Adorned with small Greek temples and statuary set in the cliffs, there were terraces, and archery lawn, Bijou theatre, and Baronial Hall for refreshments, and at one time a lake. At night the gardens were illuminated with thousands of coloured lights and there were fireworks displays and dancing. Famous bands such as the American Sousa were engaged during the season. Blondin, the trapeze artist, performed ... In 1857 as many as 20,000 visitors passed through the turnstiles in one week. By 1880 the gardens had reached the peak of their popularity ... in 1901 they were closed. During a brief revival 1903–1911, they were used in the making of early films.

A pier was built to carry these crowds ashore, and a railway station opened on the Gravesend West branch railway. It was one of the steamboats from Rosherville Gardens that was involved in a horrific accident in 1878. The Princess Alice passenger steamer was in a collision with Bywell Castle.

=== Rosherville New Town ===
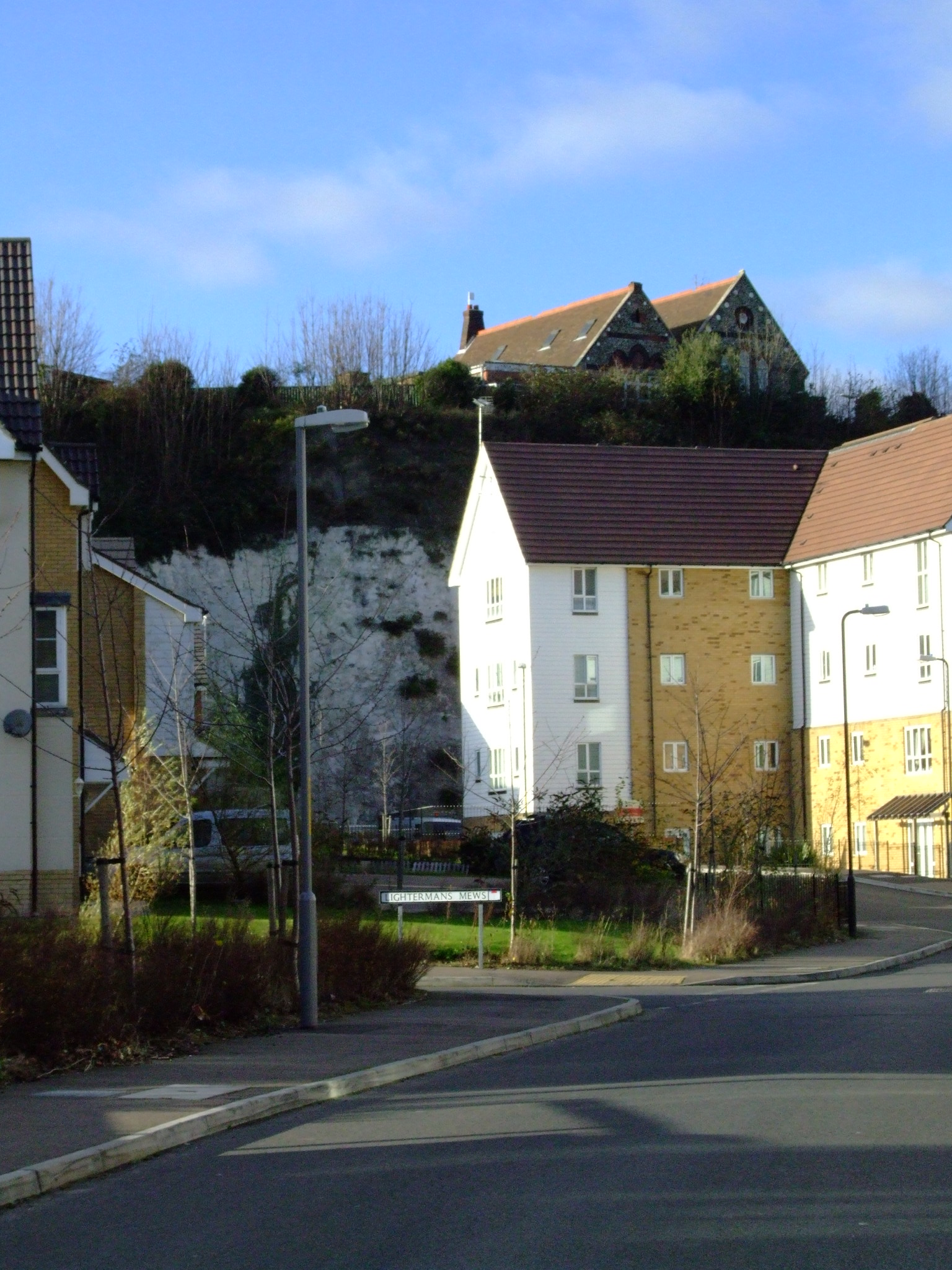
New builds in Rosherville in 2008

Joseph Rosher gave his name to a building scheme which began with the building of new houses in 1830. A prospectus states that ' this spot will ultimate become to Gravesend what St Leonards is to Hastings and Broadstairs to Margate'. That grandiose scheme did not materialise in quite that way, but the area of Northfleet still bears that name.

=== Northfleet Harbour ===
Northfleet Harbour is formed from a natural river inlet of the River Ebbsfleet into the Thames. The Harbour formed over solid chalk, and created a marine facility that was originally used by the Romans. Remains of Roman buildings have been found further up the River Ebbsfleet, and during the High Speed 1 railway works, evidence of Saxon occupation was also found. By the 18th century, a flour mill was placed within the Harbour, and later it was home to the cement industry. A local community trust is now aiming to restore the harbour and bring it back into public use.

== Governance ==
Northfleet Urban District Council was set up under the Local Government Act 1894. Within its boundaries were the hamlets of Northfleet Green and Nash Street, as well as the now built-up Perry Street; and the later estates at Shears Green, Istead Rise and Downs Road. Northfleet was merged, inter alia, with Gravesend to become Gravesham District Council on 1 April 1974.

== Demographics ==
According to the 2021 census, Northfleet has a population of 29,900 (rounded to the nearest 100). 30.0% of people in Northfleet are aged 25 to 44, above the borough average of 26.7%. The largest ethnic group is White who make up 72.0% of the population, below the borough average of 76.6%, with the second largest being Asian/Asian British who comprise 12.4% of the population, above the borough average of 11.2%. The largest religious group in Northfleet is Christianity who make up 47.3% of the population, below the borough average of 49.2%, with the second largest being No religion, who amount to 32.2% of the population, on par for the borough average.

== Industry and commerce ==
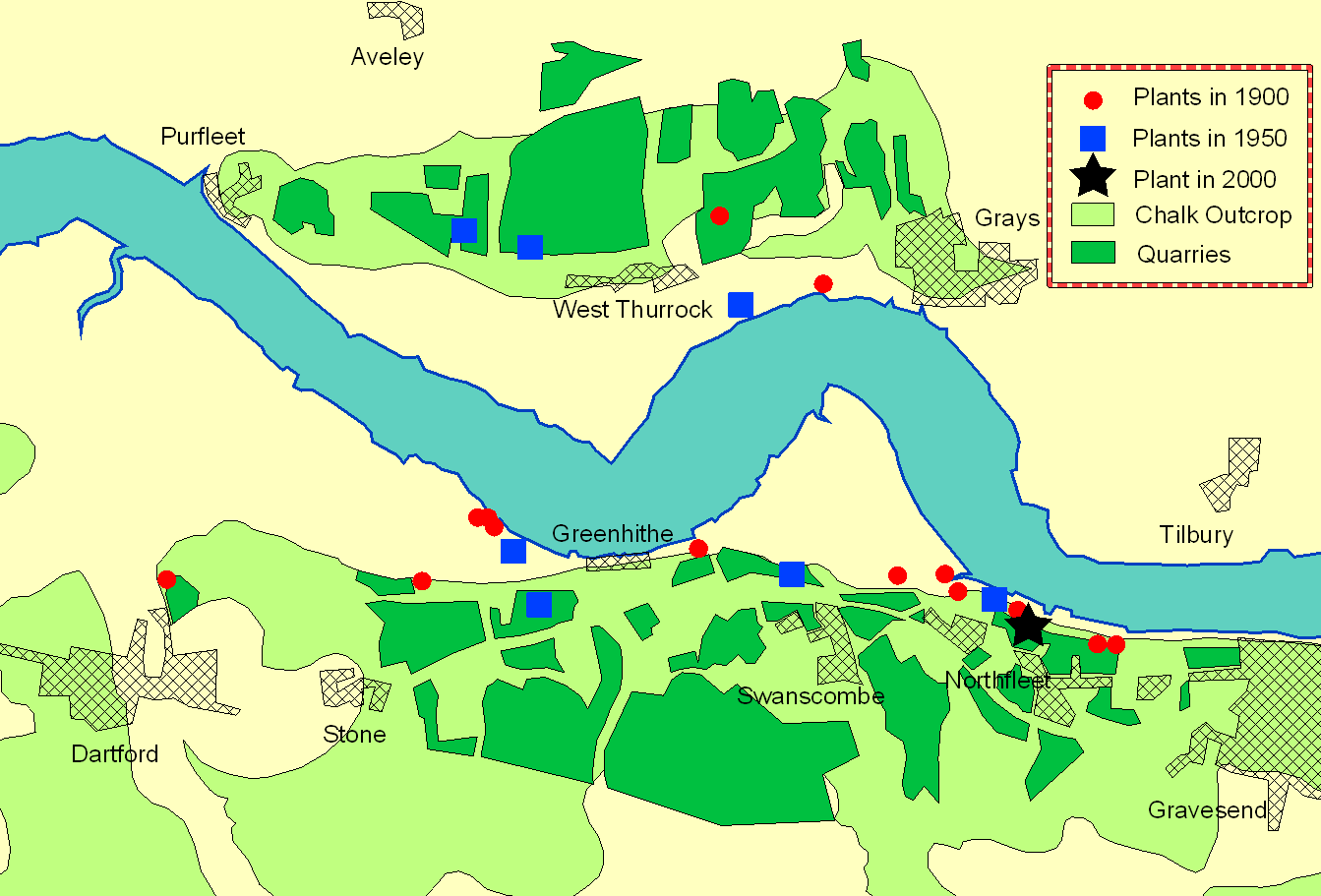
Cement works on the Thames estuary

With its situation on a busy waterway such as the River Thames, at a point where higher land came close to the river, it was an obvious place for industry to be located. The river provided water supplies and the means whereby raw materials and products could be transported. The forests of the area provided timber for various aspects of most industries. It was an area famous for Gun Flint manufacturing as Flint is found in amongst the Chalk. Flint was also used as a local building material. Flint walls can still be found in the area. The Springhead/Ebbsfleet Valley area was used for the growing of Watercress much of which supplied the London market.

=== Cement ===
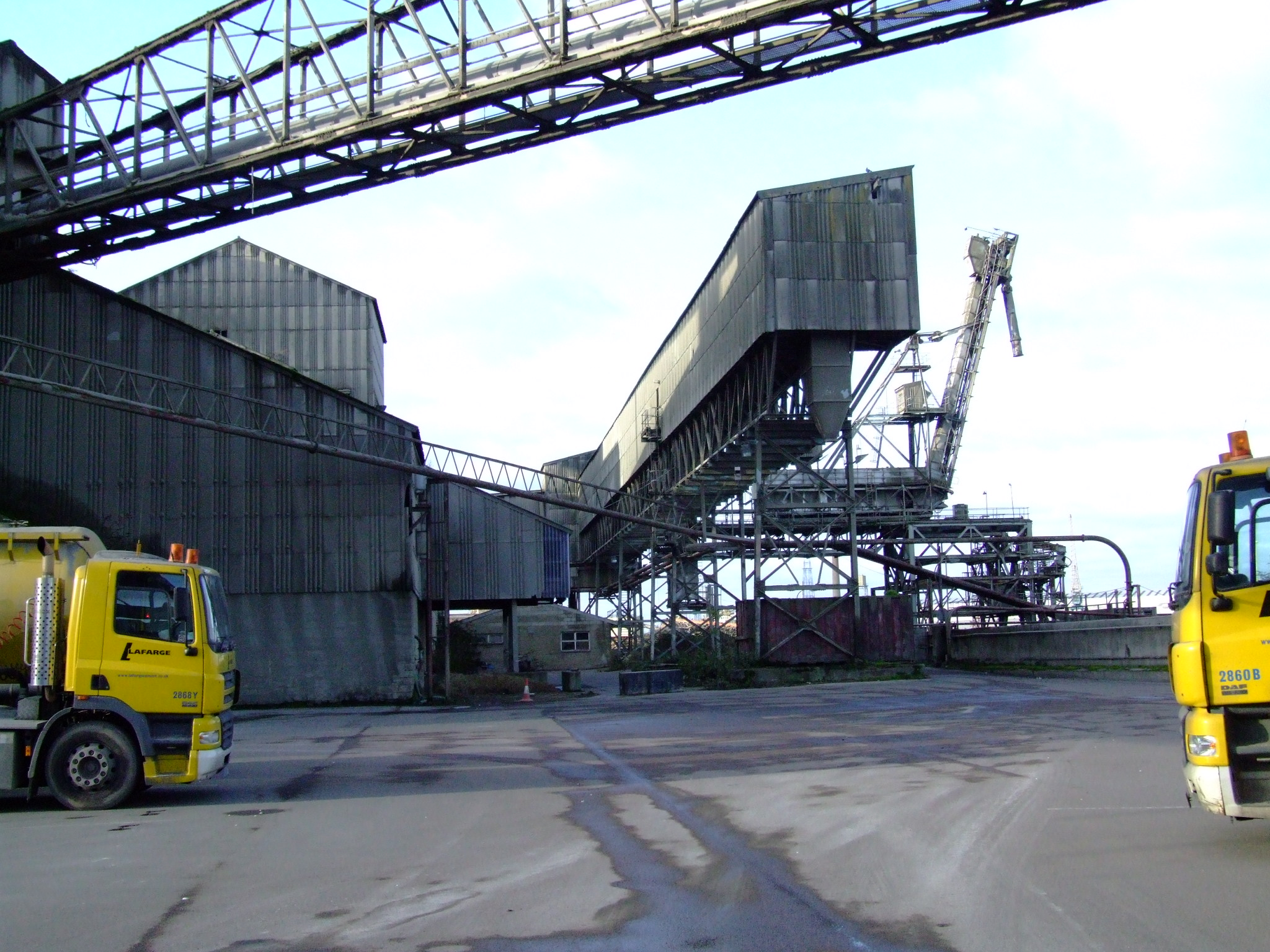
On the quay at Northfleet Cement Works in Dec 2008

The Romans first began to dig chalk from the area, but the making of cement came later. The industry requires plentiful water supplies, and chalk as its main ingredient, both of which were to hand. When in 1796, James Parker set up kilns on Northfleet creek to make his Roman cement, it was the beginning of a large complex of cement works along this stretch of the river. The manufacture of Portland cement began in April 1846 when William Aspdin, son of Joseph Aspdin, its inventor, acquired Parker's works and built new kilns.

Aspdin's works became Robins & Co in 1853, sold on to the Associated Portland Cement Manufacturers (APCM) in 1900, which was taken over by the Lafarge Group in 2001. By 1900, there were nine cement works operating on the Thames between Swanscombe and Gravesend. The last cement plant in Northfleet ceased operation in 2008.

Now under water, one of the largest chalk pits, known locally as The Blue Lake, can be found between the A226 and the North Kent Railway line. It is about 200 metres south of the access tunnel to the old (now demolished) Lafarge cement plant, that runs under the North Kent / Channel Tunnel rail-link railway lines.

=== Paper ===
Kimberly-Clark's paper mill, previously Bowaters and Bowater-Scott, was established in 1923 and makes Andrex toilet tissue.

=== Metals ===
Britannia Refined Metals, now part of Glencore, has a refinery producing lead and silver in Northfleet.

=== Northfleet Dockyard ===
By 1800, Northfleet had shipyards. Thomas Pitcher's was laid out in 1788. There is a model of one in St. Botolph's Church. The yard's first ship was Royal Charlotte, an East Indiaman of 1252 tons burthem, for the East India Company. In 1839 the company was in the hands of Pitcher's sons William and Henry. The yard closed in 1860.

=== Cable works ===
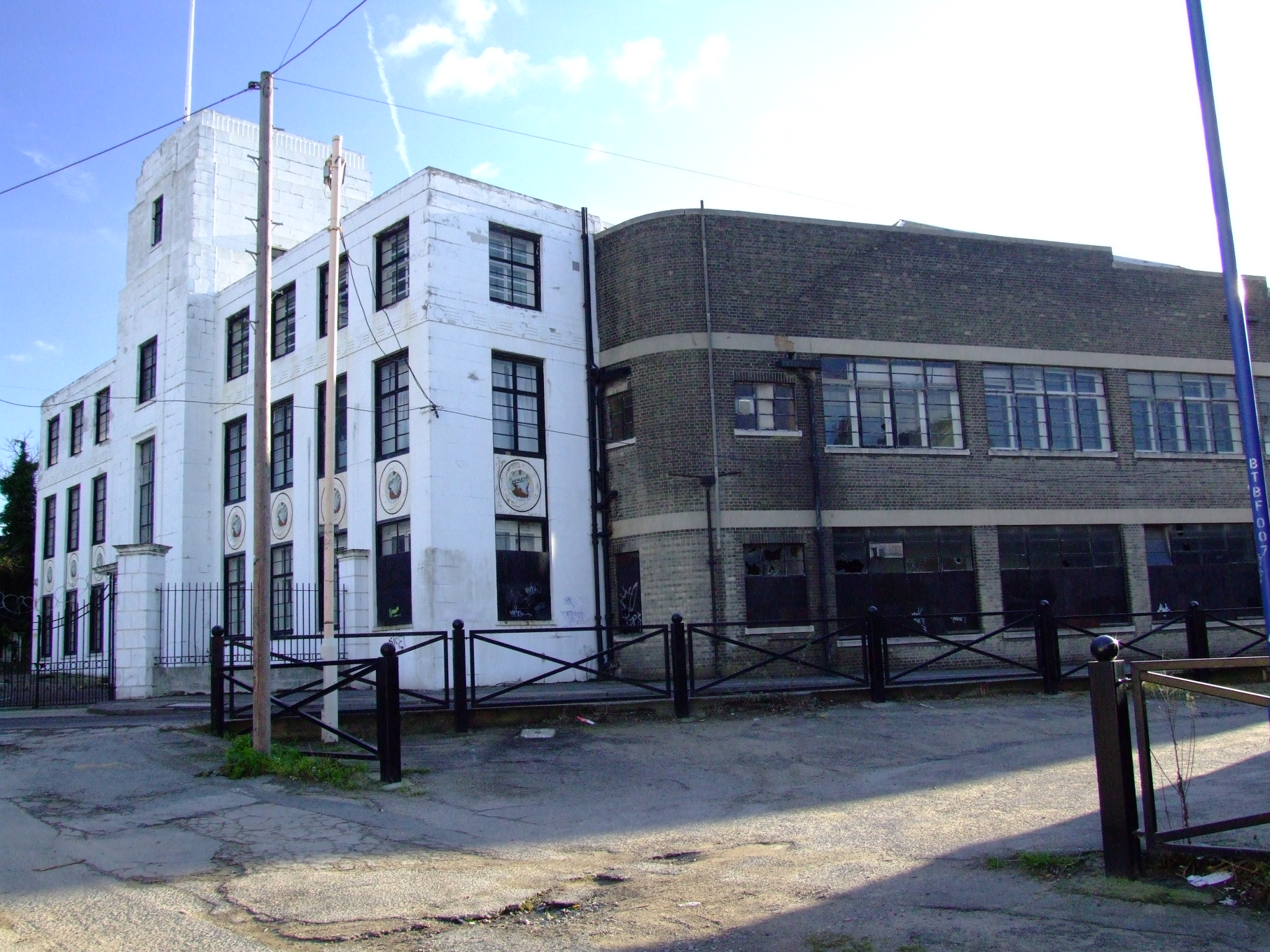
Henley's

Henley's cable works, now AEI, occupied land once used by Rosherville Gardens and was a significant employer. PLUTO pipeline was built there.

AEI Cables closed in 2005 and Henley moved in 2006. The Henley works were completely demolished by 2010. The area is being redeveloped by Keepmoat Homes as Cable Wharf.

== Redevelopment ==
In 2022, a £1.3 billion redevelopment, Northfleet Harbourside, was proposed by Northfleet Central 1 Limited, potentially creating a retail destination (225,000 sq ft of shops, restaurants, bars and cafés), 3,500 new homes and a new 8,000-seat stadium for Ebbsfleet United. However, the proposal was called in by the Ministry for Housing, Communities and Local Government in February 2025 and, in August 2026, following a public enquiry, planning permission for the development was refused over fears it might expose 7,000 future residents to "highly toxic lead poisoning", among other issues, including impacts on a Thamesside materials wharf and a thriving industrial estate.

== Transport ==
=== Rail ===
Northfleet railway station opened in 1849 as part of an extension of the North Kent Line from Gravesend to London and runs services operated by Southeastern and Thameslink. Southeastern trains run to Gravesend and London Charing Cross, and Thameslink ones to Rainham and Luton.

Gravesend railway station is closer to much of Northfleet's residential area than its own station and Access For All is available there and not at Northfleet.

Ebbsfleet International railway station on the High Speed 1 line is located less than a mile from Northfleet. It is served by Eurostar and Southeastern trains, both running to and from London St Pancras.

Ebbsfleet International has poor pedestrian connections to Northfleet station and although its domestic passenger entrance is within a quarter of a mile, the walking distance between the two is greater.

=== Buses ===
Northfleet is served by Arriva Kent Thameside, with route 480 operating from Dartford Temple Hill to Gravesend. It is also covered by Fastrack services, serving key areas such as Springhead and Ebbsfleet International, including services to the Castle Hill development.

However, the collapse of Galley Hill Road in 2023 impacted bus services, requiring them to take long detours to continue services towards Dartford, with emergency timetable changes going into eftect (such as the Fastrack B diverted via the A2). Routes such as the 480 were forced to take a diversion of approximately ten minutes.

== Education ==
Non-selective secondary schools serving Northfleet include Northfleet School for Girls and Northfleet Technology College, formerly Northfleet School for Boys.

== Media ==
Television signals are received from the Crystal Palace TV transmitter, placing Dartford in the BBC London and ITV London areas. BBC South East region is also the default BBC One variant given to Northfleet postcodes on Channel 101 through satellite television such as Freesat.

Local radio stations are: BBC Radio Kent (96.7 FM), Heart South (103.1 FM), Gold (603 AM) and KMFM West Kent, which broadcasts from its studios in Strood on 96.2 FM.

Local newspapers include the Gravesend Messenger and News Shopper.

== Northfleet churches ==
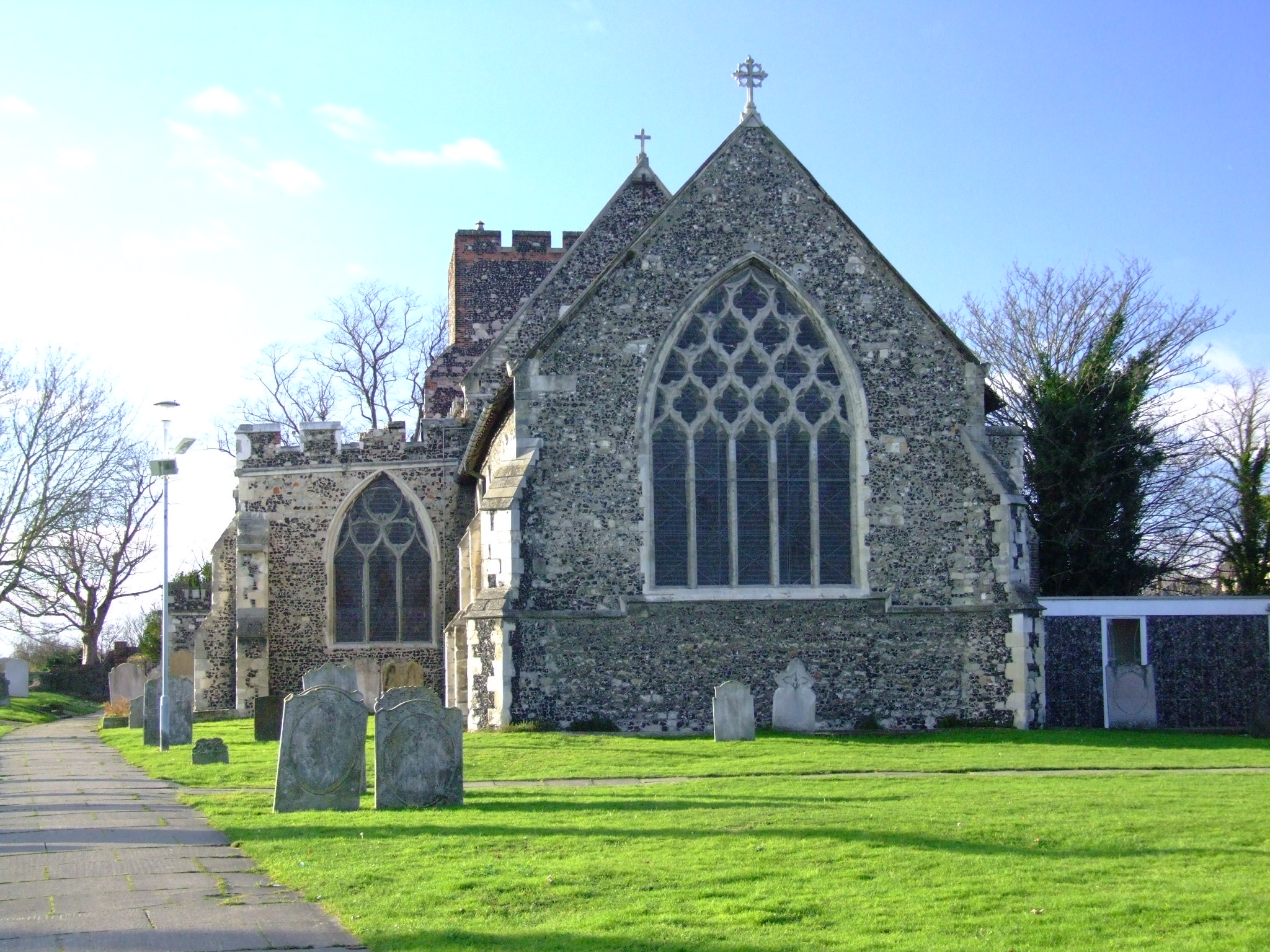
St Botolph's

The ancient parish church of Northfleet (dating from the 14th century, but with work from earlier periods) is dedicated to St Botolph. Its tower was built in 1717, after the original had fallen. Rosherville St Mark's Church is now part of the Team ministry with St. Botolph's church. The other active church in Northfleet is All Saints, Perry Street which is Anglo Catholic. All Saints Perry Street is the largest Anglican parish in Gravesham Borough with a quarter of the Gravesham population living within its boundaries.

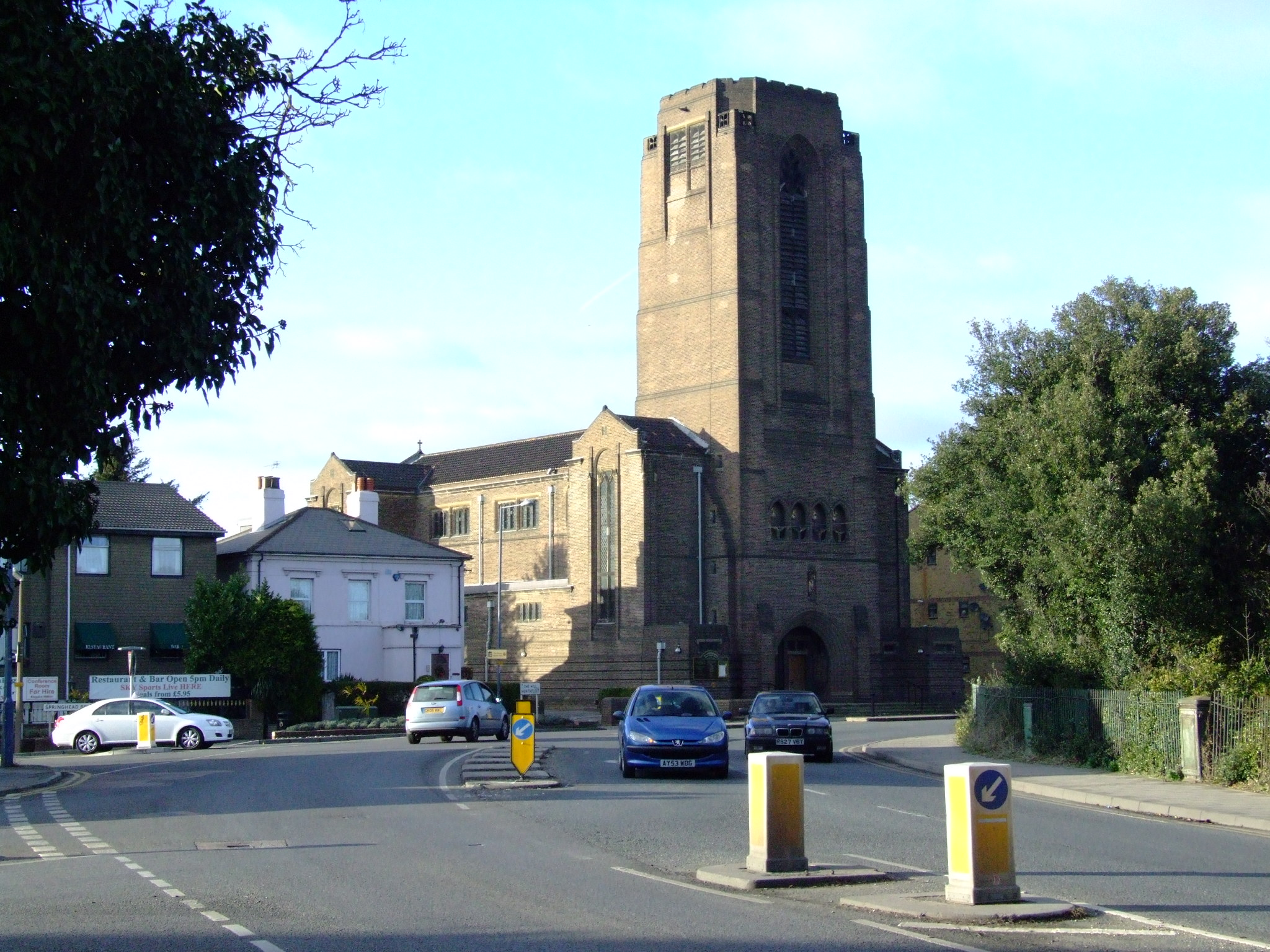
The Roman Catholic Church

The Roman Catholic church, Our Lady Of The Assumption designed by Giles Gilbert Scott and with its tower foreshadowing his Liverpool Cathedral. It was constructed in 1914 on the site of a former Tram Depot. During WW2, and the blitz, the German Air Force used the tower of the Church as a guide into London. The pilots used the tower as a reference point for direct access into London.

There is a United Reformed Church (URC) on Dover Road in Northfleet. The Dover Road Chapel was opened on Wednesday 20 June 1850 as a Congregational Church. Northfleet URC is grouped with three other churches in the North Kent URC group. These are St Paul's URC, Singlewell Road, Gravesend; Hartley URC and Southfleet URC.

== Culture and community ==
=== Rotary Club ===
The Rotary Club of Northfleet was founded in 1954, originally with members drawn from the major river front industries, but as these declined membership changed. In 2005, it was renamed Northfleet with Ebbsfleet Rotary Club, to reflect the growing importance of Ebbsfleet.

=== Portlands ===
The Portlands Factory Club, opened on July 31, 1878. It was later named the Blue Circle Club and eventually Portlands Spectrums until 2007. It was built by Parr and Strong for Thomas Bevan. The building includes a basement, double-height ground floor, and ornate attic with slate roofs. It has central recessed sections with round-headed windows and tower-like terminal parts accessible by bridges. These segments are adorned with Corinthian pilasters, ascending to pitched roofs with dormer windows. The building's well-preserved decorations exhibit early uses of Portland cement.

It had halls, sports facilities, a library, and hosted local clubs and societies. A bowling green and outdoor pool were added in 1907.

The building was listed Grade 2 in 1983, and closed in 2009. Since then it has fallen in to disrepair and suffered damage from suspected arson attacks.

== Sports ==
=== Ebbsfleet United Football Club ===
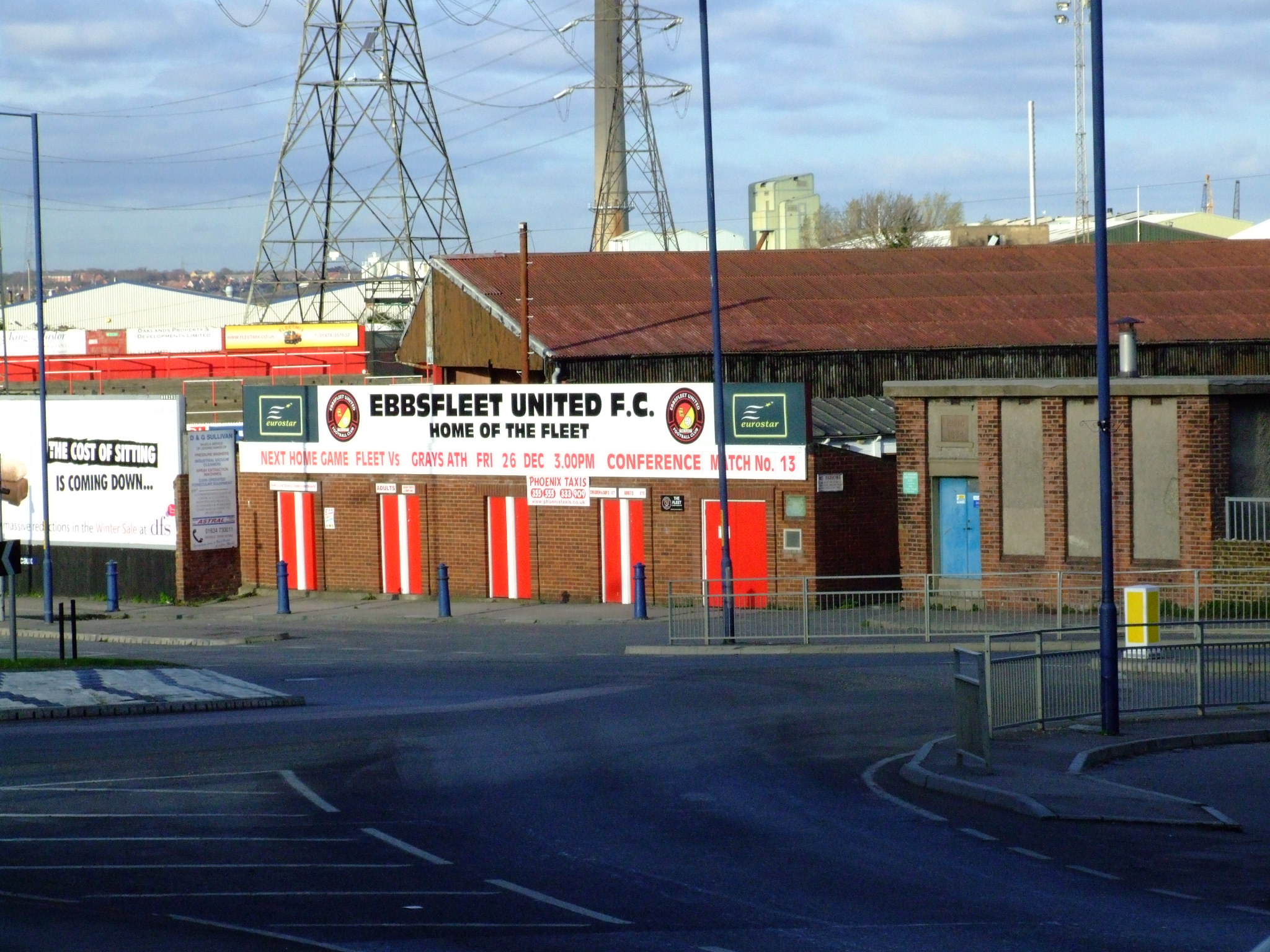
The Fleet's Stadium

Gravesend & Northfleet FC was formed through amalgamation in 1946 of Gravesend United FC and Northfleet United FC which prevented the almost certain bankruptcy of the latter. Gravesend (being by far the larger of the two towns, in terms of population), was always going to be the first name of the new club. The association football club is now known as Ebbsfleet United F.C. As of the start of the 2023–2024 season, Ebbsfleet are in the National League.

=== Northfleet Football Academy ===
Northfleet Football Academy was started in 2009 by local school Northfleet Technology College. Northfleet Football Academy was designed to recruit the elite of Graveshams football players and give them the best possible coaching to help them develop as players. It also offers its participants the opportunity to take a BTEC in Sports and one other additional subject like Science to help the players gain nationally recognised qualifications at key stage 4 whilst the players develop their playing skills. The academy is run by Northfleet Technology College teachers Brian Meaney (manager) and Lisa Donaldson (chairman) and also boasts the professional coaching of former Welsh international and current Ashford Town manager Steve Lovell. The academy is based in Colyer Road, Northfleet.

=== Fleet Leisure Football Club ===
Fleet Leisure F.C. were a Non-League football team who played in the Kent Invicta Football League. The team were originally based at Nelson Road, and then groundshared with Rochester United F.C. For the 2014–15 season the club changed its name from Fleet Leaisure to Gravesham Borough. The 2016–17 season saw the club enter the FA Cup for the first time in their history when they entered the competition in the preliminary qualification round. They folded prior to the 2018–19 season after being unable to raise the funding required to continue playing. The club name has been continued by Gravesham Borough Youth Football Club.

=== Gravesham Borough Football Club ===
Gravesham Borough F.C. were a non-League football team who played in the Southern Counties East Football League. The team was originally based at Nelson Road, then groundshared with Chatham Town F.C.

=== Northfleet Urban Country Park ===
Northfleet Urban Country Park sits on the eastern side of Northfleet, on Thames Way opposite the new police station, bounded by Springhead Road & Vale Road. The site is 10.5 hectares and provides a variety of wildlife habitats.

== Notable people from Northfleet ==
- Stan Aldous (1923–1995), football player.
- Cyril Beldam (1869–1940), cricket player.
- Hilda Braid (1929–2007), actress.
- Barry Ditchburn (1949), professional motorcycle racer.
- Arthur Gouge (1890–1962), aircraft engineer.
- Arthur Greenslade (1923–2003), arranger and conductor.
- Simon Hinks (born 1960), cricket player.
- Thomas Pitcher (1745-1837), shipbuilder
- William Charles John Pitcher, (1858–1925), theatre costume and scenery designer.
- Richard Southwood (1931–2005), zoologist.
- Thomas Sturge (1786-1866), merchant and cement manufacturer
- William Bradbery ( 1776-1860), Watercress entrepreneur

== See also ==
- Hiscock, Robert H (1796). A History of Gravesend. Phillimore. ISBN 0-85033-242-7.
