= Bradbery =

Bradbery is a surname. Notable people with the surname include:

- Danielle Bradbery (born 1996), American country singer
- Gordon Bradbery (born 1951), Australian politician and pastor
- William Bradbery (1776–1860), English entrepreneur

== See also ==
- Bradbury (surname)
