= Ebbsfleet River =

River in Kent, England

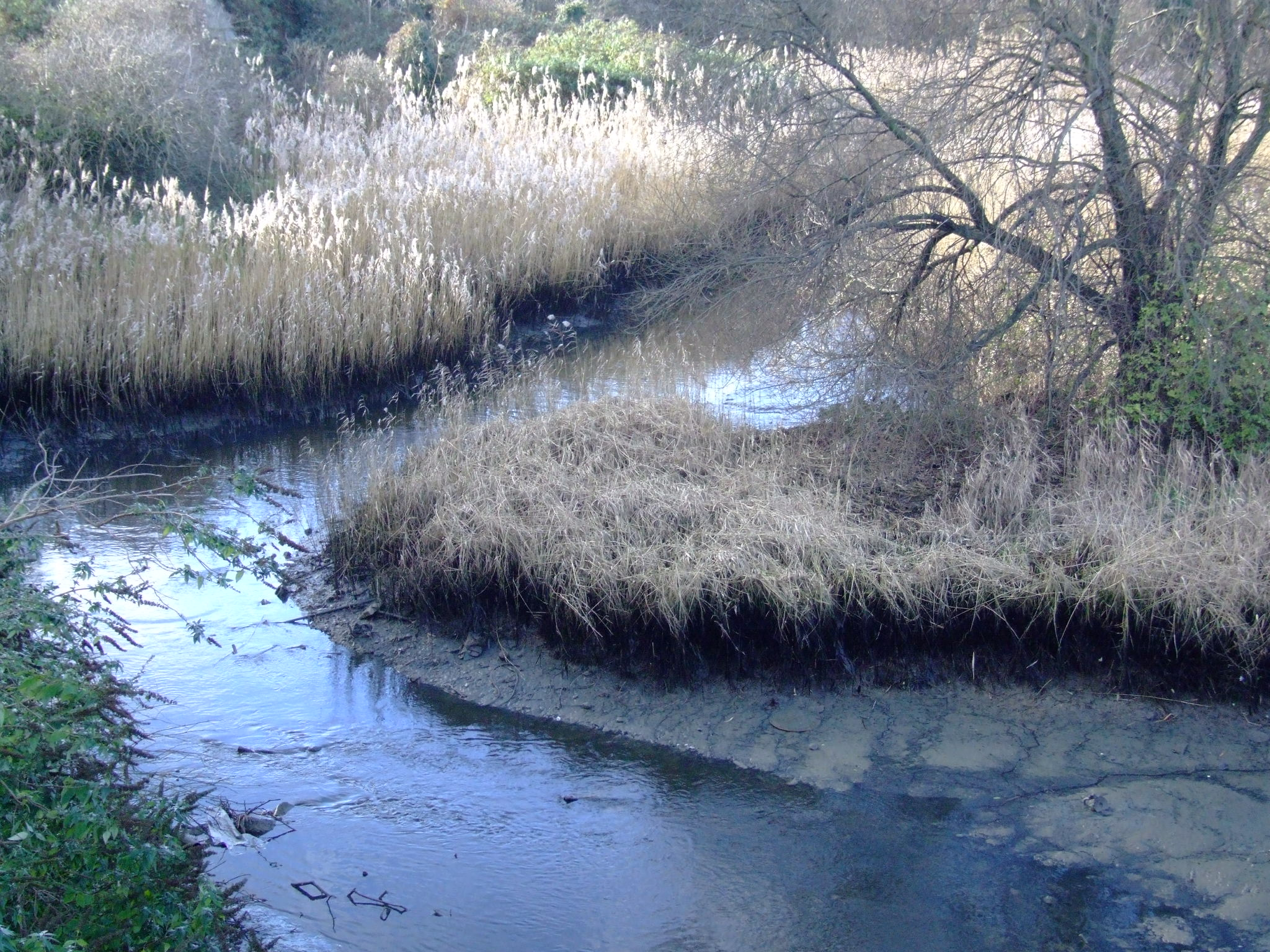
- The Ebbsfleet River just before it enters the Thames Estuary at Northfleet

Physical characteristics
- Source
  - location: Eight natural springs at Springhead; TQ 616728
  - coordinates: 51°26′13″N 0°18′54″E
  - elevation: 10 m (33 ft)
- Mouth
  - location: River Thames estuary TQ 620750
  - coordinates: 51°27′01″N 0°19′47″E
  - elevation: 0 m (0 ft)
- Length: 2.4 mi (3.9 km)

Ebbsfleet River in Kent, south-east England, is a tributary of the Thames Estuary. It joins the Thames at Northfleet, opposite the container port of Tilbury Docks. Today, the river gives its name to the Ebbsfleet Garden City, which is currently (2020) being developed in and around the course of the Ebbsfleet.

== History ==
It was formerly known as the River Fleet, giving its name to Northfleet and Southfleet. Its source was eight natural springs at Springhead. In Roman times the source was the site of a Roman settlement with many temples called Vagniacis, and the river was used to link Watling Street to the River Thames; in the fourteenth century it was a stopping place for pilgrims going to Canterbury. A bridge across the Ebbsfleet at Northfleet is mentioned in 1451 and the river was still tidal and used for shipping in the sixteenth century.

In the nineteenth century, the river was the earliest centre in Britain for the commercial cultivation of watercress, begun by William Bradbery in 1808. He moved the business to West Hyde, Hertfordshire in 1820.

Following the removal of its waters around 1901, when all its waters were used by the local water company, its dried riverbed was the subject of a botanical study by Marie Stopes, the birth control activist. Parts of the river can still be seen.

Before 1960, the Ebbsfleet received the discharge from the Northfleet sewage works, this effluent was subsequently piped direct to Robins Creek where the Ebbsfleet enters the Thames.

== Etymology ==
The name Ebbsfleet may well be an artificial creation of the seventeenth-century antiquary Thomas Philpott and mentioned in his Villare Cantianum; the name may have been partly inspired by Ebbsfleet in Thanet, 75 km (47 mi) to the east on the Kent coast. This latter is the place in East Kent mentioned in the Anglo-Saxon Chronicle as Ebba's Creek, Ypwines fleot (version A) or Heopwines fleot (version E). Thomas Philpott was the elder son of John Philipot, Somerset Herald, whose early list of Lords Warden of the Cinque Ports appears on p. 12 of Villare Cantianum.
