= Lemsford Springs =

Nature reserve in Hertfordshire, England

Coordinates: 51.796447°N 0.22866°W

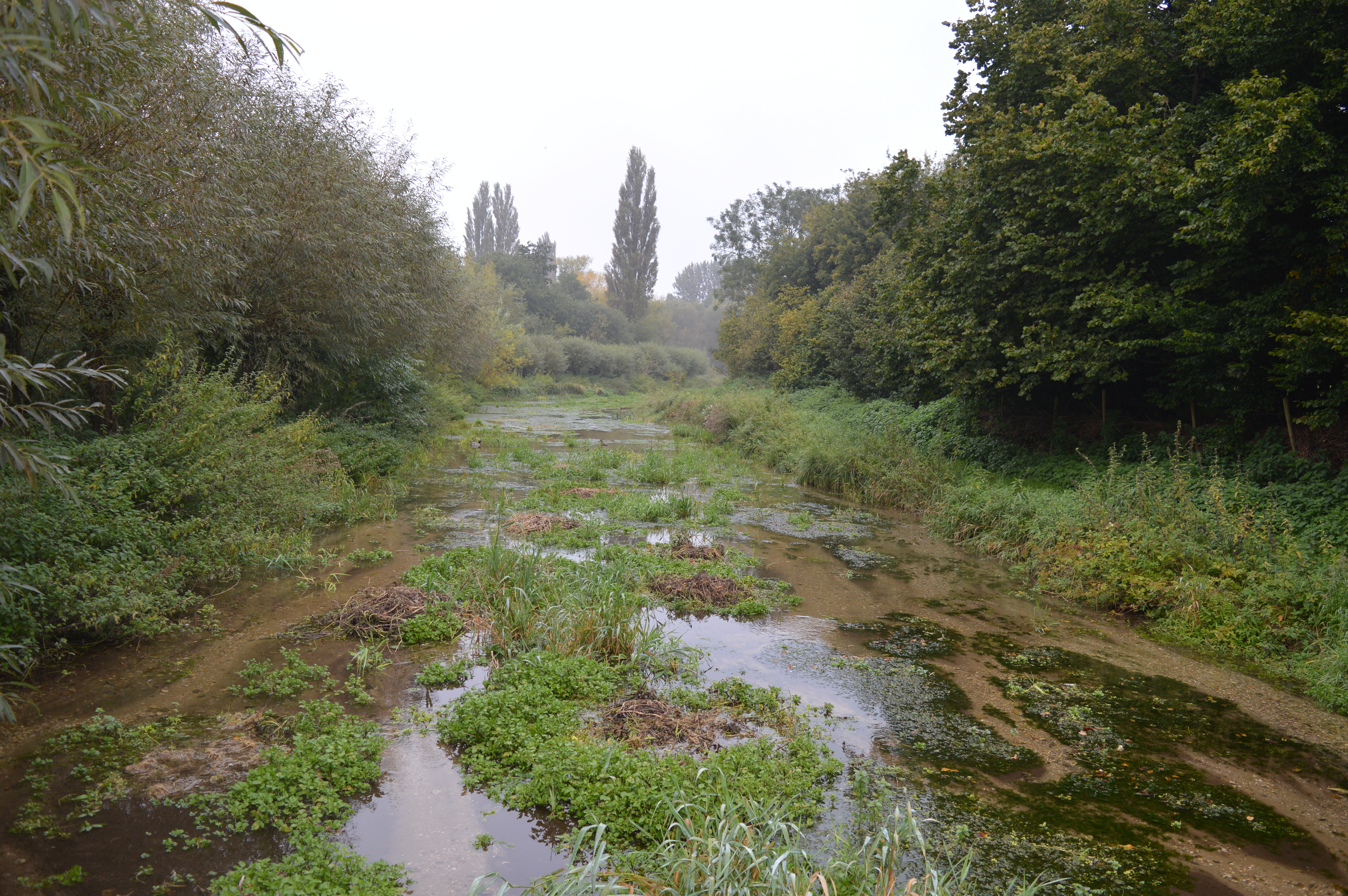
- View over reserve
- Interactive map of Lemsford Springs
- Location: Hertfordshire, England

Lemsford Springs is a 4 hectare nature reserve in Lemsford, Hertfordshire, England. It is managed by the Herts and Middlesex Wildlife Trust, which purchased the site in 1970. Notable for its lagoons, the site is in the Lea valley and its other habitats are meadow, hedgerows, marsh and willow woodland. The spring feeds the nearby River Lea.

Before becoming a nature reserve, the site was used as a watercress bed. Its lagoons are fed by springs, so they never freeze over and provide an important habitat for birds in cold winters. There are two bird hides, and birds which can be seen include water rails, snipe and green sandpipers. Green sandpipers are migratory; a colour ringing project has revealed information about the travels of the Lemsford population including their breeding sites in Scandinavia.

There are also water shrews and around fifty species of water snails.

The reserve is kept locked and access can be arranged with the Wildlife Trust warden.

== See also ==
- Watercress Wildlife Site
