= Watercress Wildlife Site =

Nature Reserve in St Albans, Hertfordshire, England

Coordinates: 51.7436°N 0.3328°W

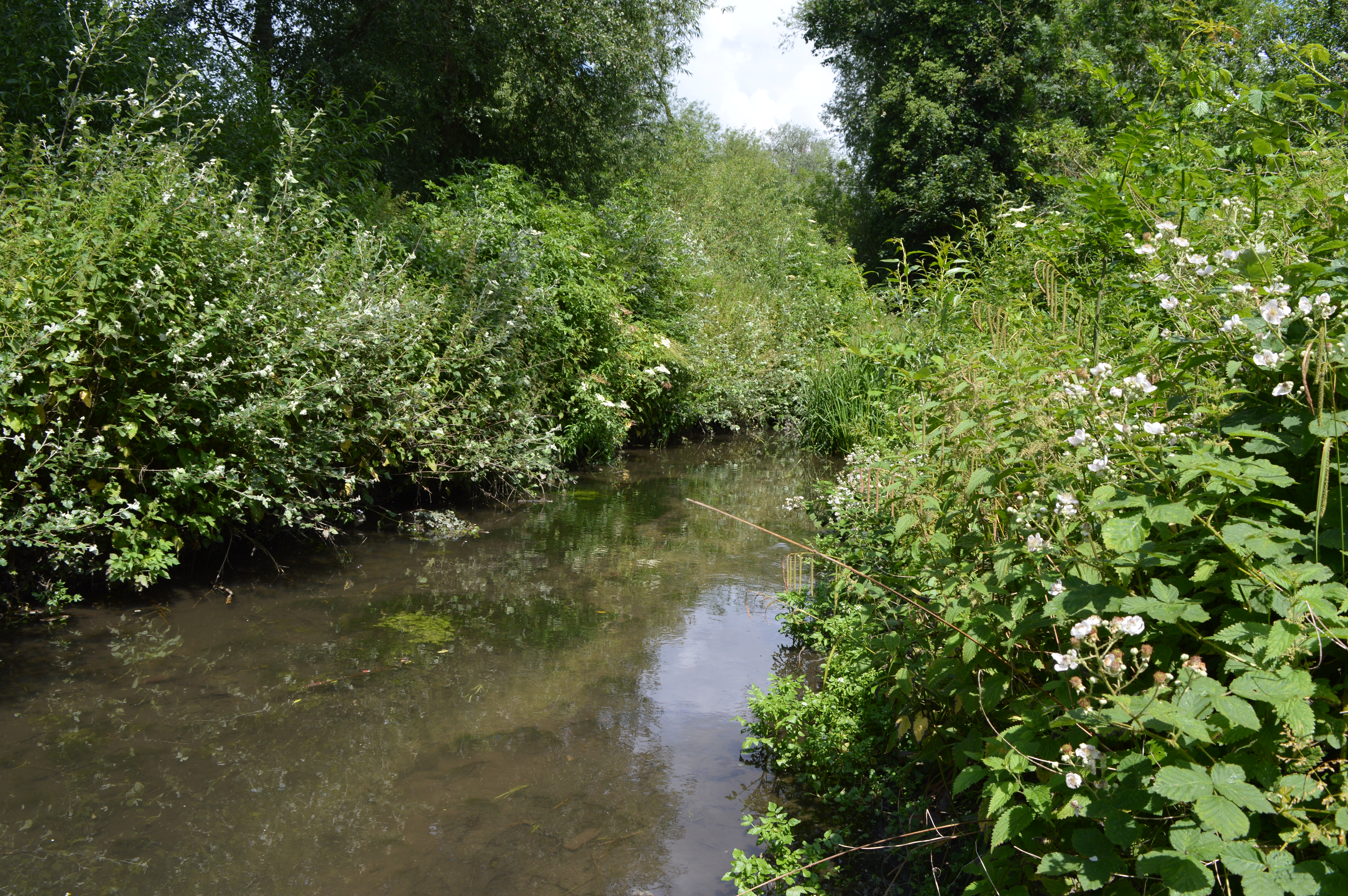
The River Ver in the Watercress Wildlife Site

Watercress Wildlife Site is a 1.2-hectare (3.0-acre) Local Nature Reserve in St Albans, Hertfordshire, England. It is owned by St Albans City Council and managed by the Watercress Wildlife Association, a registered charity. The boundaries of the site are the Alban Way, the River Ver and the houses of Riverside Road.

Until 1972 the site was one of the many commercial watercress beds in the area. It was then used partly as allotments, with fly tipping in some areas. In 1991 the council leased the site to the Watercress Wildlife Association, which cleared the site to become a nature reserve and gradually took over the allotments.

The site has a wide variety of wildlife, including water rails, kingfishers, little grebes and muntjac deer.

== Facilities ==
There is access from the junction of Riverside Road and Cornwall Road. Facilities include a hide, seating area and information board.

== See also ==
The Herts and Middlesex Wildlife Trust has a reserve at Lemsford Springs, Lemsford, which is also a former watercress bed.
