= Cothill House =

Private school in Oxfordshire, England

Coordinates: 51.693°N 1.331°W

Cothill House, Cothill
- Cothill, Oxfordshire, OX13 6JL; England

Information
- Type: Private day and boarding school Preparatory School
- Motto: Dum spiro spero ("While I breathe, I hope")
- Religious affiliation: Church of England
- Established: 1860 (moved to present location in 1870)
- Department for Education URN: 123297 Tables
- Head Master: George May
- Gender: Coeducational
- Age: 8 to 13
- Enrolment: 204
- Publication: The Cothill Magazine
- Former pupils: Old Cothillians
- Website: http://www.cothill.net/

Cothill House is a day and boarding coeducational private school for preparatory pupils in Cothill, Oxfordshire, which houses around 160 pupils from the ages 7–13.

== History ==
The school was started in 1860 in Dry Sandford, before moving to its present location in 1870. Previously a boys' school, it began to move towards co-education in 2024. The school was operated by the Prep Schools Trust, a charity registered in England. and in September 2025, became part of Radley Schools Group.

In 2024, the school was listed by the Oxford Mail as one of 45 Oxford schools with stories of sexual harassment and abuse collected by the website Everyone's Invited.

Cothill is situated on a 26-acre site is just a short drive from central Oxford, and the school is widely recognised as one of the UK’s leading prep schools. For the last 150 years Cothill House was almost exclusively for boarders, yet this changed in September 2023 when it opened the door to day pupils. This coincided with the arrival of a new headmaster, George May, who was previously a housemaster at the nearby Radley College. In September 2025, the school began to accept girls.

== Present school ==
The school is academically successful, and the class sizes are small, with an average of 14 pupils per class. Cothill House routinely sends boys to destinations such as Eton, Harrow and Radley.

Cothill write that they are a day and boarding school committed to helping every child discover their strengths. The school has a core values rooted in kindness, humour, teamwork, curiosity and respect.

== Headmasters ==
- 2023: George May
- 2011 – 2023: Duncan Bailey

== Notable alumni ==
- Gaj Singh of Jodhpore, diplomat and politician
- John Bradbury, 2nd Baron Bradbury
- Hugh Stockwell, Deputy Supreme Allied Commander Europe
- James Charles Macnab of Macnab, Chief of Clan Macnab
- Rupert Thorneloe, British Army Officer
- Richard Dinnick, BAFTA nominated writer
- Alexander Gordon, 7th Marquess of Aberdeen and Temair
- Jeremy Thorpe, British politician, leader of the Liberal Party 1966–76
- Richard Symonds, civil servant
- Hugh Pym, British journalist and author
- Archie Campbell, Marquess of Lorne, British aristocrat
