= William Bradbury =

William Bradbury may refer to:

- William Bradbury (printer) (1799–1869), English printer, co-founder of Bradbury and Evans
- William Hardwick Bradbury (1832–1892), his son, printer
- William Batchelder Bradbury (1816–1868), American musician
- William Bradbury (footballer) (1884–1966), English soccer player
- Bill Bradbury (footballer, born 1889) (1889–1963), English footballer
- Bill Bradbury (footballer, born 1933) (1933–1999), English footballer
- Bill Bradbury (1949–2023), American politician

== See also ==
- William Bradbery (1776–1860), British watercress pioneer
- William Herbert Bradburn, Canadian politician
