= Rupert Thorneloe =

British Army soldier (1969–2009)

Lieutenant Colonel Rupert Thorneloe MBE
- Born: 17 October 1969; Kirtlington, Oxfordshire, England
- Died: 1 July 2009 (aged 39) near Lashkar Gah, Afghanistan
- Burial place: Buckland, Oxfordshire, England
- Military career
- Allegiance: United Kingdom
- Branch: British Army
- Service years: 1991–2009 †
- Rank: Lieutenant Colonel
- Service number: 535472
- Unit: Welsh Guards
- Commands: 1st Battalion, Welsh Guards
- Conflicts: The Troubles; Iraq War; War in Afghanistan: Operation Panther's Claw
- Awards: Member of the Order of the British Empire

Lieutenant Colonel Rupert Stuart Michael Thorneloe, MBE (17 October 1969 – 1 July 2009) was a British Army officer who was killed in action on 1 July 2009 near Lashkar Gah, Helmand Province in southern Afghanistan. Thorneloe is the highest-ranking British Army officer to have been killed in action since Lieutenant Colonel H. Jones's death in 1982 during the Falklands War.

== Early life and education ==
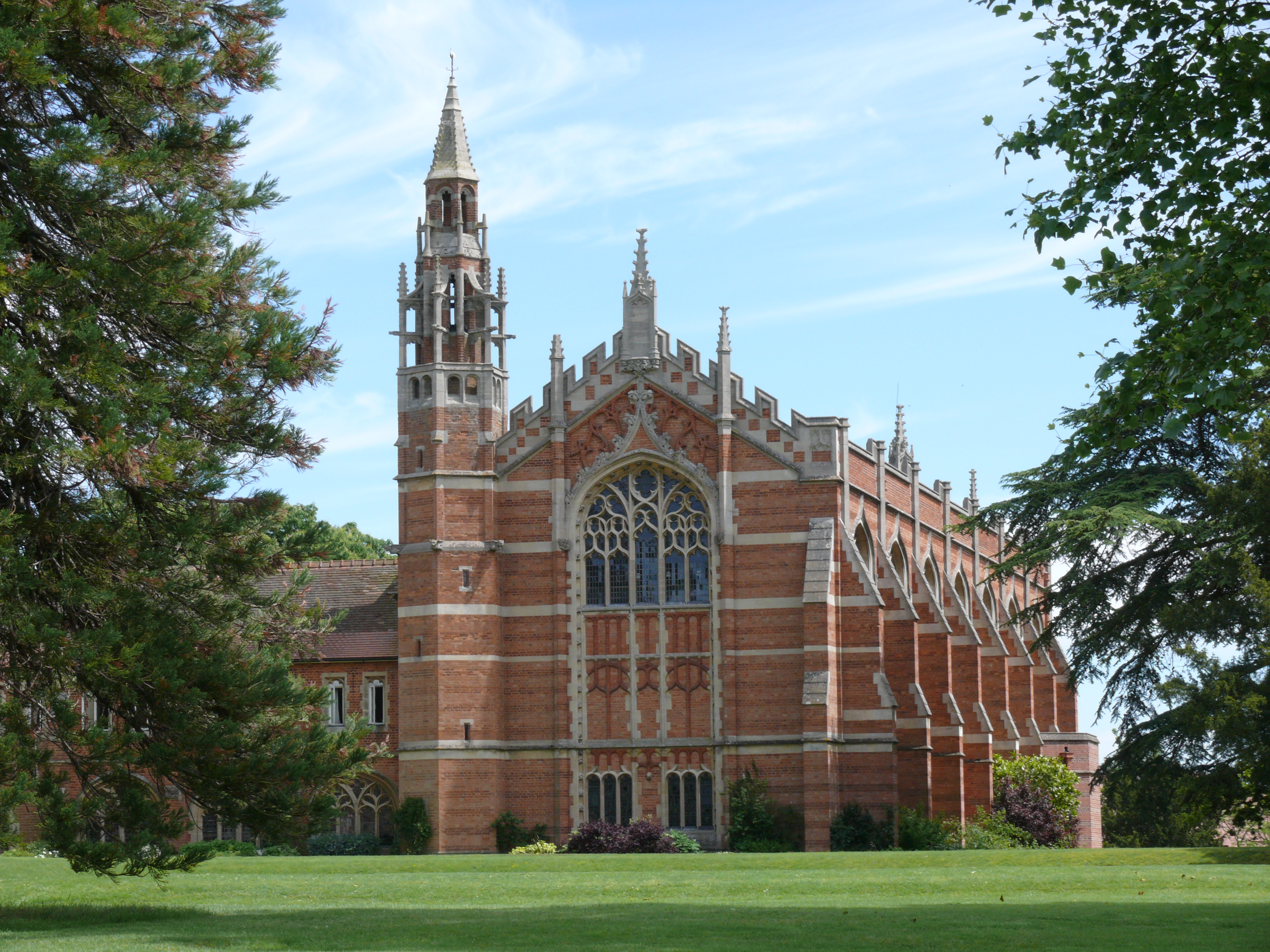
Radley College

Thorneloe was born on 17 October 1969 at Kirtlington, Oxfordshire. His father Major John Thorneloe was a Second World War veteran who died in 2019 at age 96. Rupert Thorneloe attended Cothill House school, and Radley College in Radley, near Abingdon in Oxfordshire, and the University of Reading in Reading, Berkshire. Thereafter, he trained at the Royal Military Academy Sandhurst, and graduated with an MA in Defence Studies from King's College London in 2002.

== Military career ==
On 6 September 1991, Thorneloe was commissioned as a second lieutenant on probation in the Welsh Guards on a short service commission. His commission was later confirmed and backdated to 5 August 1989, and he was promoted to lieutenant with seniority from 5 August 1991. He served in Northern Ireland as a platoon commander and company second-in-command, and also worked for a year as an intelligence liaison officer for his regiment, liaising with the Royal Ulster Constabulary Special Branch in South Armagh. According to author Toby Harnden, who became a friend of Thorneloe in Northern Ireland in the late 1990s, Thorneloe played a key role in the British campaign against the IRA's South Armagh sniper and the capture of four members of one of the sniper teams.

Thorneloe was promoted to captain on 1 April 1995. He switched to a special regular commission on 5 October 1995, and an ordinary regular commission on 18 September 1996, electing to make the Army his permanent career. He was appointed battalion adjutant and, on 30 September 1999, was promoted to major, and posted to Permanent Joint Headquarters, Northwood, where he worked in intelligence analysis. In 2002, Thorneloe studied at the Joint Service Command and Staff College, Shrivenham, and then took command of a company in Bosnia. Later, in 2004, Thorneloe moved to HQ 1st (UK) Armoured Division as Operations Officer.

In 2005, as the division was due to take over the role of Multi-National Division (South-East) (Iraq), Thorneloe was sent to Iraq ahead of the main deployment, and travelled to Basra to begin planning for the transition to Iraqi control. The Times said that the divisional commander Lieutenant General John Cooper "looked on Thorneloe as his right-hand man in analysing and presenting the options in this process". On 8 September 2006, Thorneloe was appointed Member of the Order of the British Empire for his service in the Iraq War. He became military assistant first to the Assistant Chief of the Defence Staff (Policy), Major General Andrew Stewart, and then to the Secretary of State for Defence, Des Browne.

Thorneloe was promoted to lieutenant colonel on 30 June 2008, and became commanding officer of his battalion just before it deployed to Afghanistan in April 2009 with about a Battle Group of about 1,000 troops based first at Camp Bastion and later in Nad-e-Ali in Helmand Province.

== Death ==
Thorneloe was killed by the Taliban in Operation Panther's Claw while riding in an 18-vehicle convoy when an improvised explosive device exploded under his BvS 10 Viking armoured vehicle. The explosion also killed Trooper Joshua Hammond of the 2nd Royal Tank Regiment and injured six other soldiers. The deaths of Thorneloe and Hammond brought the total number of fatalities of British Forces personnel in Afghanistan since 2001 to 171. Thorneloe had successfully argued that the Brigade plan for Panther's Claw was too ambitious and should be modified. He opted to witness the front line himself.

As of July 2009, Thorneloe was the first British Army CO and most senior officer to have been killed in action since Lieutenant Colonel H. Jones in the Falklands War, the highest-ranking to die in Afghanistan in post-colonial times, and one of eight British Army commanding officers "killed on operations" since 1948. Across the British Armed Forces, Thorneloe was most recent highest-ranking British officer to have been killed on operations since Wing Commander John Coxen of RAF Benson on 6 May 2006 in Basrah, Iraq.

Thorneloe's death reinvigorated debate over the adequacy of military equipment supplied to British forces in Afghanistan, with charges focusing on the alleged lack of transport helicopters, which forces troops to travel by land and become exposed to Taliban IED attacks, and the inadequate protection offered by Viking armoured vehicles against IEDs and land mines. On 5 June 2009, Thorneloe had written to Brigade headquarters that not only was the number of helicopters inadequate but they were not being tasked correctly: "I have tried to avoid griping about helicopters – we all know we don’t have enough. But the new Ring Route system for managing them is very clearly not fit for purpose."

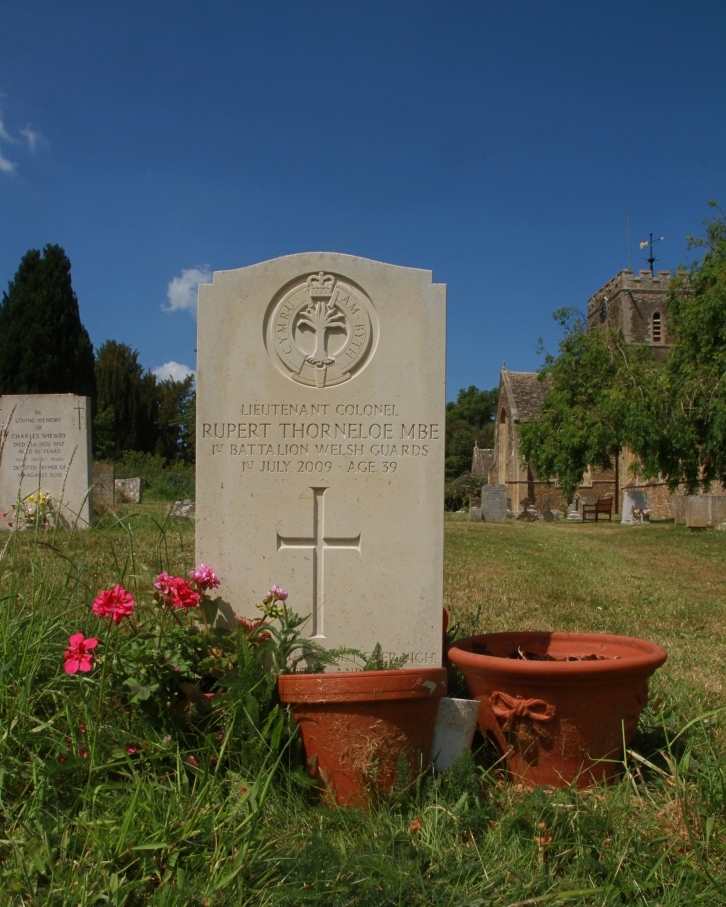
Thorneloe's headstone at Buckland, Oxfordshire

Thorneloe's funeral was held on 16 July 2009. The hearse carrying his coffin passed through Aldershot Barracks, which was lined with Guardsmen, and then to the Guards Chapel at Wellington Barracks, London. A bearer party of eight Welsh Guardsmen carried the coffin into the chapel. On his coffin were placed his scabbard, sword, cap, belt and medals along with a wreath of white roses. The service was attended by Charles, Prince of Wales, Camilla, Duchess of Cornwall, Des Browne, and Thorneloe's family. He was buried in the parish churchyard of St Mary the Virgin, Buckland, Oxfordshire. In 2012, his name was added to the University of Reading War Memorial.

Thorneloe is featured extensively in the book Dead Men Risen: The Welsh Guards and the Defining Story of Britain's War in Afghanistan (Quercus, 2011) by Toby Harnden, which won the 2012 Orwell Prize for Books. A poetry competition is held at Cothill House every year in his honour.
