= Stan Aldous =

English footballer (1923–1995)

Personal information
- Full name: Stanley Elvey Reginald Aldous
- Date of birth: 10 February 1923
- Place of birth: Northfleet, England
- Date of death: 17 October 1995 (aged 72)
- Place of death: Ely, England
- Position: Centre half

Senior career*
Years	Team	Apps	(Gls)
	Gravesend & Northfleet	?	(?)
1950–1958	Leyton Orient	302	(2)
1958–1959	Headington United	2	(0)
Total		304	(2)
- * Club domestic league appearances and goals

Stanley Elvey Reginald Aldous (10 February 1923 – 17 October 1995) was an English professional footballer who played as a defender for Leyton Orient in the Football League as well as for Headington United from 1958 to 1959.

== Playing career ==
Aldous was born in Northfleet, Kent, on 10 February 1923 and played for Erith & Belvedere, Bromley and Gravesend & Northfleet before joining Leyton Orient as a free agent in 1950. He went on to make over 300 league appearances for Orient and captained the club to the Third Division championship in 1956. He later joined Headington United, coached at Queens Park Rangers and managed Gravesend. Aldous died in Ely, Cambridgeshire, on 17 October 1995.
