= Springhead, Kent =

Village in Kent, UK

Coordinates: 51°25′50″N 0°19′42″E

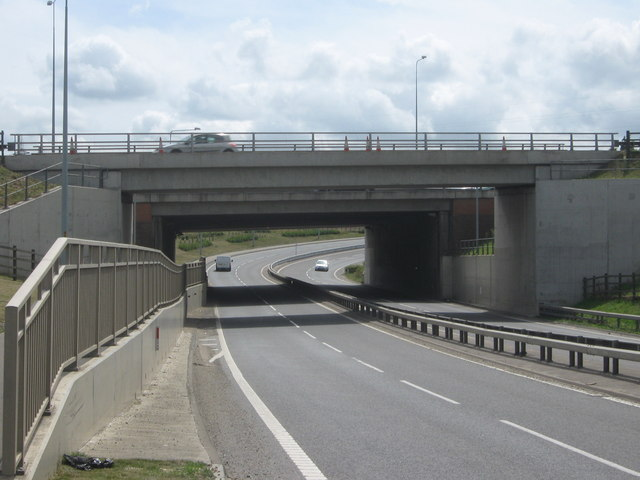
Bridges over the B259 Southfleet Road

Springhead lies at the source of the River Ebbsfleet, just southwest of the Gravesend suburban conurbations. Springhead forms one of the major quarters of the Ebbsfleet Valley development, with housing and the associated facilities now under construction. It is the point at which the High Speed 1 rail line meets the A2 road.

== History ==
In ancient times it surrounded a pool formed from eight natural springs, and the Roman road Watling Street, ran through Springhead. They knew it as Vagniacae. The site had a large number of temples, together with various buildings used for trade.

William Bradbery was the first man to grow watercress commercially, in Springhead in 1808.
