= Peter Bradbury (cricketer) =

English cricketer (born 1950)

Peter Bradbury (born 12 March 1950) was an English cricketer. He was a left-handed batsman and right-arm off-break bowler who played for Oxfordshire. He was born in Pill.

Bradbury, who played in the Second XI Championship for Gloucestershire and Somerset, played for Oxfordshire in the Minor Counties Championship between 1978 and 1987.

He made a single List A appearance for the side, during the 1980 Gillette Cup, against Warwickshire. He scored 22 runs with the bat, and took figures of 1–55 from 10 overs of bowling.
