= Baron Bradbury =

Barony in the Peerage of the United Kingdom

Baron Bradbury, of Winsford in the County of Chester, is a title in the Peerage of the United Kingdom. It was created on 28 January 1925 for the economist and public servant Sir John Bradbury. He was Joint Permanent Secretary to the Treasury from 1913 to 1919 and considered to be the British government's chief economic adviser during the First World War. As of 2023, the title was held by his great-grandson, the fourth Baron, who succeeded his father in that year.

== Baron Bradbury (1925) ==
- John Swanwick Bradbury, 1st Baron Bradbury (1872–1950)
- John Bradbury, 2nd Baron Bradbury (1914–1994)
- John Bradbury, 3rd Baron Bradbury (1940–2023)
- John Timothy Bradbury, 4th Baron Bradbury (born 1973)

The heir presumptive is the present holder's brother, the Hon. Benjamin Edward Bradbury (born 1975).

== Arms ==
Coat of arms of Baron Bradbury
Crest In front of two ostrich feathers in saltire Argent a boar’s head erect Proper. Escutcheon Sable a chevron Ermine between in chief two buckles and in base a fleur-de-lis Argent. Supporters Dexter a raven Proper sinister a dove Proper. Motto Justitia Aequitas Fides (Justice, Equity and Good Faith)
