= Lemsford =

Village in Hertfordshire, England

Coordinates: 51°48′N 0°14′W

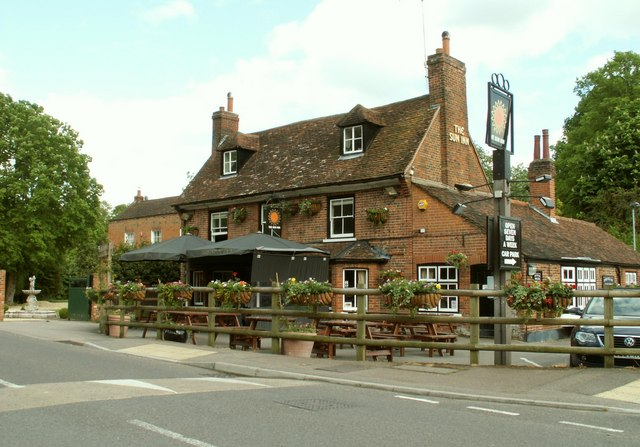
- The Sun Inn at Lemsford

- Location within Hertfordshire
- Civil parish: Hatfield
- District: Welwyn Hatfield
- Shire county: Hertfordshire
- Region: East
- Country: England
- Sovereign state: United Kingdom
- Post town: Welwyn Garden City
- Postcode district: AL8
- Police: Hertfordshire
- Fire: Hertfordshire
- Ambulance: East of England
- UK Parliament: Welwyn Hatfield

Lemsford is a village in Hertfordshire, England. It is located close to Welwyn Garden City and Hatfield and is in the Hatfield Villages Ward of the Borough of Welwyn Hatfield.

Both the River Lea and the early Great North Road (before it was diverted east of the village) pass through Lemsford, which was once a major coaching stop for wagons and horses commuting in and out of London. The nature reserve Lemsford Springs is located nearby, a vital sanctuary for rare birds such as the Green sandpiper.

Lemsford is also well-known in the area for its traditional English country Fete, held each May Day Bank Holiday at St. John's School and Church. Activities include maypole dancing, raffles and live music.

== History ==
The parish was created in 1858 out of the parish of Bishop's Hatfield. However, the settlement is older.

=== Buildings of interest ===
==== Lemsford Mill ====
Lemsford Mill is a Grade II listed 19th-century structure on the River Lea. It probably occupies the site of one of four mills at Hatfield which were recorded in the Domesday Book in 1086. It has been refurbished to provide office accommodation. The mill features a water wheel which generates electricity. The building was both regional and national winner of the British Council for Offices awards 2007 in the ‘small project’ category. The site by the mill was expanded to build The Mill Race, a small group of business units adjacent to the mill.

==== Brocket Hall and Lemsford church ====
In the 19th century when Lemsford became a separate parish, Brocket Hall, which is on the edge of Lemsford, was part of the Cowper estates. The church was erected in 1859 as a memorial to the sixth Earl Cowper. It is Early English and Decorated in style, with a good east window, the latter also dedicated to the memory of the earl. The tower (west) is lofty and embattled.

==== Bridge House ====
Bridge House is a grand house in the village located next to The Sun pub. The house dates back to at least 1807 and was double-fronted, subsequently being extended by new owners. Listed owners of the house include Edmund Whittingstall in 1832 and William Lams in 1851. It is a grade II listed building.

==== The Sun Inn pub ====
The first time the Sun Inn is mentioned as an ale house is in 1717. It is the sole surviving pub in Lemsford following the closure of The Long and Short Arm in 2023.

The Lemsford Local History Group researches and curates the history of Lemsford and surrounding areas.

== People from Lemsford ==
- Stephen Ward, osteopath and a significant figure in the Profumo affair of 1963, was born at Lemsford in 1912. His father was the vicar of Lemsford.
