= Leone C. Bradbury =

- Born: 31 December 1905; Aurora, Colorado
- Died: December 1983

Leone C. Bradbury (31 December 1905 – December 1983) was an American muralist whose 1930s mural series Flights of Fancy is displayed in the Centennial Hall in Colorado Springs, CO as of October 2014.

She was born to George and Catherine Bradbury in Denver, CO. She attended the University of Denver in 1924 and earned a Bachelor of Fine Arts from Yale University in 1932.

== Works ==
Bradbury's mural series Flights of Fancy was originally commissioned in the 1930s for the Ellsworth Elementary School in Denver. The series features nine paintings with fairy tale themes. In 2014 the murals were acquired from Denver Public Schools by El Paso County and installed in Centennial Hall.
