= John Bradbury, 3rd Baron Bradbury =

British peer (1940–2023)

The Right Honourable The Lord Bradbury

Member of the House of Lords
- Lord Temporal
- Hereditary peerage 1994 – 11 November 1999
- Preceded by: The 2nd Baron Bradbury
- Succeeded by: Seat abolished by the House of Lords Act 1999

Personal details
- Born: John Bradbury; 17 March 1940
- Died: 8 August 2023 (aged 83)
- Spouse: Susan Liddiard (m. 1968)
- Children: 2

John Bradbury, 3rd Baron Bradbury (17 March 1940 – 8 August 2023) was a British peer, the third Baron Bradbury. He was a member of the House of Lords from 1994 to 1999.

== Early life ==
The grandson of John Bradbury, 1st Baron Bradbury, Permanent Secretary to HM Treasury, he was educated at Gresham's School, Holt, and the University of Bristol. He had a twin sister, the Hon. Elizabeth Joan Hansen (married to Warren Gustin Hansen), and a younger half-sister, the Hon. Anne Bradbury (married to Alastair James Ker-Lindsay).

== Career ==
The majority of Bradbury’s career in marketing communications was spent at US advertising giant McCann-Erickson Worldwide, where he oversaw global client relationships including Unilever, Nestle, Bacardi-Martini and Reckitt & Benckiser, eventually joining the board in New York. He retired in 2000 but served as Chairman of the board of governors at Perrott Hill preparatory school in Somerset for over a decade.

In 1994, he succeeded his father John Bradbury, 2nd Baron Bradbury (1914–1994), in the House of Lords.

== Personal life ==
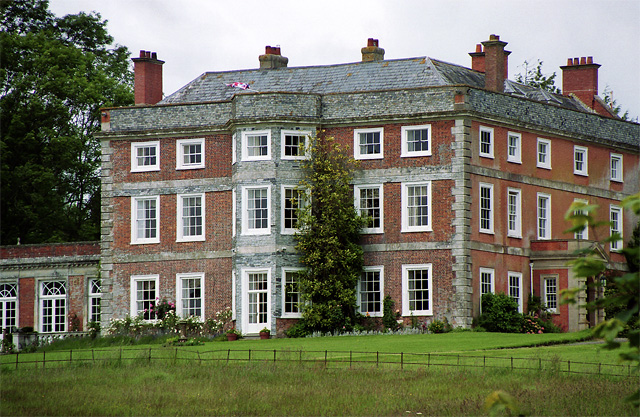
The Manor House, Wootton Fitzpaine

Bradbury married Susan Liddiard in 1968, and they have two sons.

John Bradbury died on 8 August 2023, at the age of 83. Their elder son, John Timothy Bradbury, born 1973, succeeded to the peerage.

As of 2023, the family seat was the Manor House, Wootton Fitzpaine, Dorset.

== Arms ==
Coat of arms of John Bradbury, 3rd Baron Bradbury
| Crest In front of two ostrich feathers in saltire Argent a boar’s head erect Proper. Escutcheon Sable a chevron Ermine between in chief two buckles and in base a fleur-de-lis Argent Supporters Dexter a raven Proper sinister a dove Proper. Motto Justitia Aequitas Fides (Justice, Equity and Good Faith) |

Peerage of the United Kingdom
| Preceded by John Bradbury | Baron Bradbury; 1994–2023; Member of the House of Lords (1994–1999) | Succeeded by John Bradbury |
