= John Bradbury, 2nd Baron Bradbury =

British peer

John Bradbury, 2nd Baron Bradbury, of Winsford in the County of Chester (7 January 1914 – 31 March 1994) was a British peer and member of the House of Lords, the second holder of the title Baron Bradbury.

The son of John Bradbury, 1st Baron Bradbury GCB, Permanent Secretary to HM Treasury, by his marriage to Hilda, a daughter of W. A. Kirby, he was born on 7 January 1914 and baptized two months later at St Clement Danes, Westminster. He was educated at Cothill House, Westminster School, and Brasenose College, Oxford.

In 1939 he married firstly, 1939, Joan Knight, of Addlestone, Surrey, and they had one son and one daughter. In 1946 he married secondly Gwerfyl Roberts, one daughter. In 1950 he succeeded his father as Baron Bradbury. Bradbury died on 31 March 1994, while living at Engomi, near Nicosia, Cyprus. The peerage was inherited by his only son, John (born 17 March 1940).

== Arms ==
Coat of arms of John Bradbury, 2nd Baron Bradbury
Crest In front of two ostrich feathers in saltire Argent a boar’s head erect Proper. Escutcheon Sable a chevron Ermine between in chief two buckles and in base a fleur-de-lis Argent. Supporters Dexter a raven Proper sinister a dove Proper. Motto Justitia Aequitas Fides (Justice, Equity and Good Faith)

Peerage of the United Kingdom
Preceded by John Bradbury	Baron Bradbury; 1950–1994	Succeeded by John Bradbury
