= John Bradbury (footballer, born 1874) =

English footballer (1874–1842)

John Joseph Longstaff Bradbury (28 December 1874 – 1942) was an English footballer from South Bank, Yorkshire. An outside right, he made 57 appearances in The Football League, scoring 7 goals, for Lincoln City, Blackburn Rovers, Derby County, Barnsley and Bristol City.
