= John Bradbury, 1st Baron Bradbury =

British economist and public servant (1872–1950)

Baron Bradbury in the 1920s.

John Swanwick Bradbury, 1st Baron Bradbury GCB (23 September 1872 – 3 May 1950) was a British economist and public servant.

Bradbury was born in Crook Lane, Winsford, Cheshire, the son of John Bradbury and Sarah Cross. He was educated at Manchester Grammar School, The King's School, Chester and Brasenose College, Oxford, and joined the Civil Service in 1896. He served as Private Secretary to the Chancellor of the Exchequer H. H. Asquith from 1905 to 1908, as Principal Clerk in the Treasury and First Treasury Officer of Accounts from 1908 to 1911, as Joint Permanent Secretary to the Treasury from 1913 to 1919 and as the Principal British Delegate to the Reparations Commission in Paris from 1919 to 1925. During the First World War he was the government's chief economic adviser.

He was appointed Companion of the Order of the Bath (CB) in 1909, Knight Commander of the Order of the Bath (KCB) in 1913, and Knight Grand Cross of the Order of the Bath (GCB) for his services as Principal Reparations Commissioner in the 1920 New Year Honours. In the 1925 New Year Honours, he was raised to the peerage as Baron Bradbury, of Winsford in the County of Chester.

Lord Bradbury married Hilda Maude Kirby, daughter of William Arthur Kirby, in 1911. He died in May 1950, aged 77, and was succeeded in the barony by his eldest son John.

Treasury notes signed with Bradbury's name have been known as "Bradburys" (e.g., as early as 1921 in PG Wodehouse's updated edition of Love Among the Chickens) or "Bradbury Pound".

The Bradbury pound was introduced in 1914 at the outbreak of the First World War. The Government at the time needed to preserve its stock of bullion so asked the Bank of England to cease paying out gold for its notes. Instead the Treasury printed and issued 10 shilling and £1 notes (so called Bradbury pounds). The gold standard was then partially restored in 1925 and the Bank of England was again obliged to exchange its notes for gold, but only in multiples of 400 ounces or more. Britain left the gold standard in 1931 and the note issue became entirely fiduciary, that is wholly backed by securities instead of gold.

== Arms ==
Coat of arms of John Bradbury, 1st Baron Bradbury
Crest In front of two ostrich feathers in saltire Argent a boar’s head erect Proper. Escutcheon Sable a chevron Ermine between in chief two buckles and in base a fleur-de-lis Argent. Supporters Dexter a raven Proper sinister a dove Proper. Motto Justitia Aequitas Fides (Justice, Equity and Good Faith)

== Footnotes ==
Peerage of the United Kingdom
New creation	Baron Bradbury; 1925–1950	Succeeded by John Bradbury
