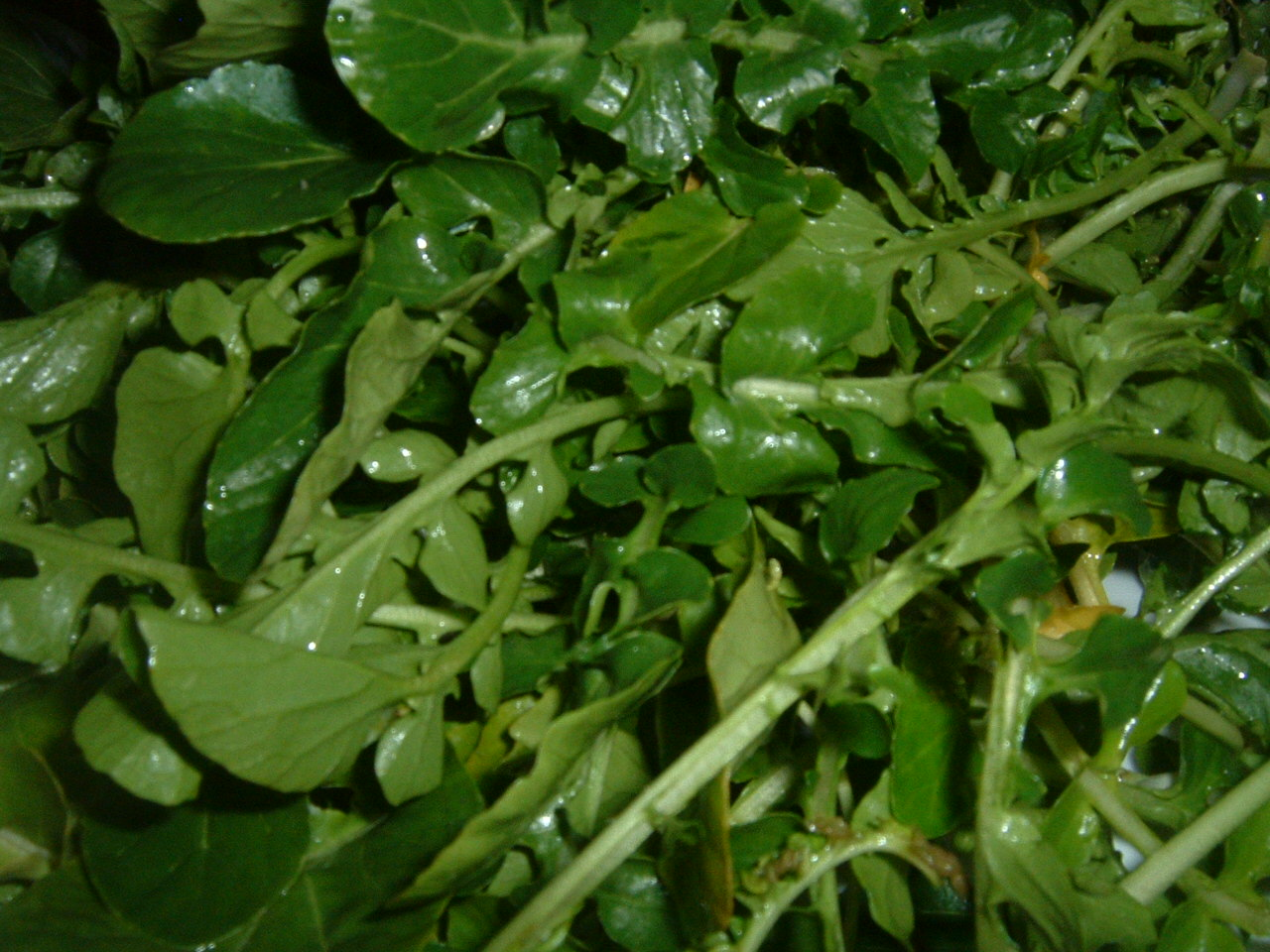
- Leaves
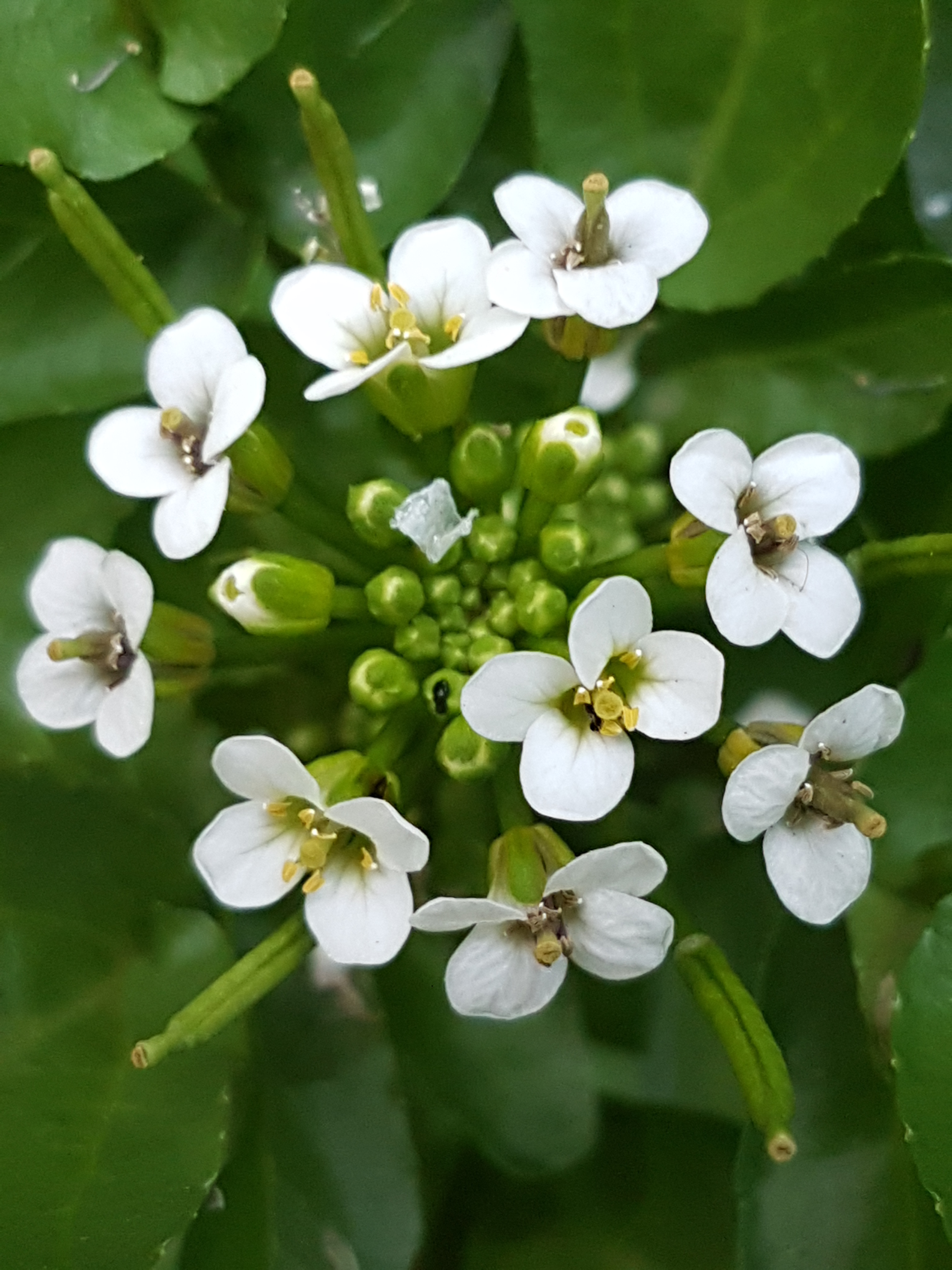
- Flowers

Conservation status
- Least Concern (IUCN 3.1)

Scientific classification
- Kingdom: Plantae
- Clade: Embryophytes
- Clade: Tracheophytes
- Clade: Spermatophytes
- Clade: Angiosperms
- Clade: Eudicots
- Clade: Rosids
- Order: Brassicales
- Family: Brassicaceae
- Genus: Nasturtium
- Species: N. officinale

Binomial name
- Nasturtium officinale W.T.Aiton

Synonyms
- Synonymy: Arabis nasturtium Clairv.; Baeumerta nasturtium P.Gaertn., B.Mey. & Schreb.; Baeumerta nasturtium-aquaticum (L.) Hayek; Cardamine aquatica (Garsault) Nieuwl.; Cardamine fontana Lam.; Cardamine nasturtium (Moench) Kuntze; Cardamine nasturtium-aquaticum (L.) Borbás; Cardaminum nasturtium Moench; Crucifera fontana E.H.L.Krause; Nasturtium fontanum Asch.; Nasturtium nasturtium-aquaticum (L.) H. Karst.; Nasturtium siifolium Rchb.; Radicula nasturtium (Moench) Druce; Radicula nasturtium-aquaticum (L.) Britten & Rendle; Rorippa nasturtium (Moench) Beck; Rorippa nasturtium-aquaticum (L.) Hayek; Rorippa officinalis (W.T. Aiton) P. Royen; Sisymbrium amarum Salisb.; Sisymbrium cardaminefolium Gilib.; Sisymbrium fluviatile Vell.; Sisymbrium nasturtium (Moench) Willd.; Sisymbrium nasturtium-aquaticum L.

= Watercress =

Species of flowering plant in the cabbage family

Watercress or yellowcress (Nasturtium officinale) is a species of aquatic flowering plant in the cabbage family, Brassicaceae.

Watercress is a rapidly growing perennial plant native to Eurasia. It is one of the oldest known leaf vegetables consumed by humans. Watercress and many of its relatives, such as garden cress, mustard, radish, and wasabi, are noteworthy for their piquant flavors.

== Description ==
Watercress can grow up to 60 centimetres (24 in) in length. The stems are hollow and float in water. The leaf structure is pinnately compound. Small, white, and green inflorescences are produced in clusters and are frequently visited by insects, especially hoverflies, such as Eristalis flies.

== Taxonomy ==
Watercress is listed in some sources as belonging to the genus Rorippa, although molecular evidence shows those aquatic species with hollow stems are more closely related to Cardamine than Rorippa. Despite the Latin name, watercress is not particularly closely related to the flowers popularly known as nasturtiums (Tropaeolum majus). T. majus belongs to the family Tropaeolaceae, a sister taxon to the Brassicaceae within the order Brassicales.

== Distribution and habitat ==
An aquatic vegetable or herb, watercress has grown in many temperate locations worldwide.

Watercress was introduced into China through Hong Kong and Macao in the 1800s from Europe. Its cultivation also spread to highland areas in the tropical regions of Asia.

Clear fast-flowing chalk streams are the primary natural habitat for wild watercress in the UK. Many settlements in England are named after watercress, from Old English êacerse, including Kersey, Kesgrave, Kersal, and Kershopefoot.

== Ecology ==
In some regions, watercress is regarded as a weed. When introduced into non-native environments, watercress can have negative impacts on native species. With the introduction of watercress, the organic matter in the sediment increases which in turn attracts predatory macroinvertebrates that feed on other plants in the environment. Due to its fast-growing nature and invasive species status, N. officinale is prohibited in Illinois.

Crops grown in the presence of manure can be an environment for parasites such as the liver fluke, Fasciola hepatica. Cultivated watercress has the advantage of being free of the liver fluke.

== Cultivation ==
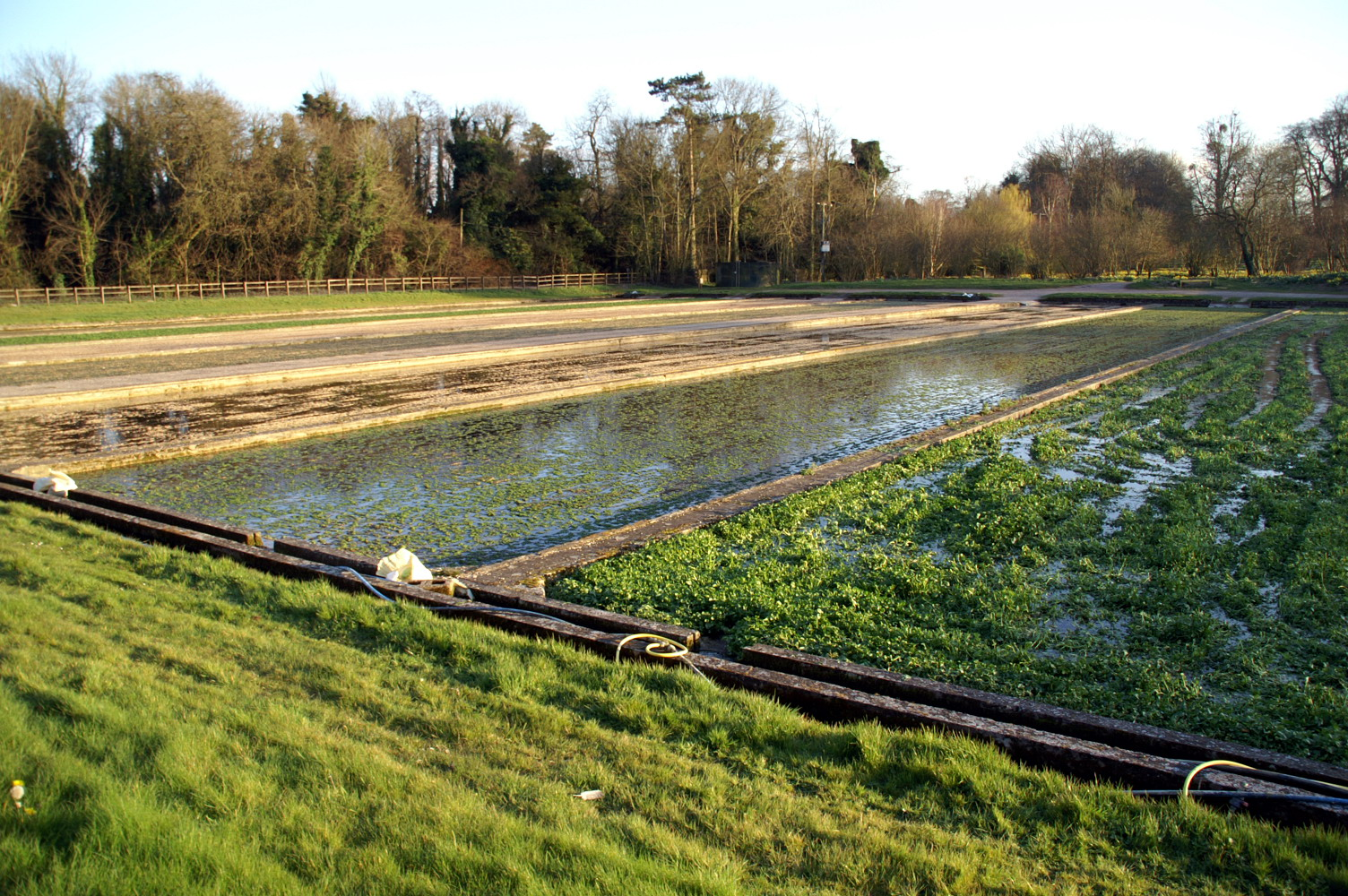
Watercress beds in Warnford, Hampshire, England

Watercress cultivation is practical on both a large scale and a garden scale. Being semi-aquatic, watercress is well-suited to hydroponic cultivation, thriving best in water that is slightly alkaline. It is frequently produced around the headwaters of chalk streams. In many local markets, the demand for hydroponically grown watercress exceeds supply, partly because cress leaves are unsuitable for distribution in dried form and can be stored fresh for only 2–3 days.

Also sold as sprouts, the edible shoots are harvested days after germination. If unharvested, watercress can grow to a height of 50 to 120 cm (1 1/2 to 4 ft).

In the UK, watercress was first commercially cultivated in 1808 by the horticulturist William Bradbery along the River Ebbsfleet in Kent. Historically important areas of cultivation also included Hampshire, Stamford and Watercress Wildlife Site at St Albans. Watercress is now grown in several counties, most notably Hampshire, Dorset, Wiltshire and Hertfordshire. New Alresford in Hampshire is considered to be the nation's watercress capital.

== Potential drug interaction ==
By inhibiting the cytochrome P450 enzyme CYP2E1, the phenethyl isothiocyanate within watercress may cause adverse drug interactions in individuals taking certain medications, such as chlorzoxazone.

== Uses ==
=== Nutrition ===
Watercress, raw
Nutritional value per 100 g (3.5 oz)
- Energy: 11 kcal (46 kJ)
- Carbohydrates: 1.29 g
- Sugars: 0.2 g
- Dietary fiber: 0.5 g
- Fat: 0.1 g
- Protein: 2.3 g
Vitamins and minerals
Vitamins	Quantity %DV^{†}
Vitamin A equiv. beta-Carotene lutein zeaxanthin	18% 160 μg 18% 1914 μg 5767 μg
Thiamine (B1)	8% 0.09 mg
Riboflavin (B2)	9% 0.12 mg
Pantothenic acid (B5)	6% 0.31 mg
Vitamin B6	8% 0.129 mg
Folate (B9)	2% 9 μg
Vitamin C	48% 43 mg
Vitamin E	7% 1 mg
Vitamin K	208% 250 μg
Minerals	Quantity %DV^{†}
Calcium	9% 120 mg
Iron	1% 0.2 mg
Magnesium	5% 21 mg
Manganese	11% 0.244 mg
Phosphorus	5% 60 mg
Potassium	11% 330 mg
Sodium	2% 41 mg
- Other constituents: Quantity
- Water: 95 g
- Full Link to USDA Database entry
- ^{†}Percentages estimated using US recommendations for adults, except for potassium, which is estimated based on expert recommendation from the National Academies.

Raw watercress is 95% water, 1% carbohydrates, 2% protein, and contains negligible fat. In a reference amount of 100 g (3.5 oz), raw watercress provides 11 calories of food energy, and is a rich source (20% or more of the Daily Value, DV) of vitamin K (208% DV) and vitamin C (48% DV), with moderate amounts (11–18% DV) of vitamin A, manganese, and potassium.

=== Culinary ===
Watercress leaves, stems, and fruit can be eaten raw. In China watercress is often boiled alongside pork and traditional medicinal ingredients to make a wintertime tonic soup. In Vietnam it is generally used raw as a component in salads.

The new tips of watercress leaves can be eaten raw or cooked, although caution should be used when collecting these in the wild because of parasites such as giardia.

As a cruciferous vegetable, watercress contains isothiocyanates that are partly destroyed by boiling, while the bioavailability of its carotenoids is slightly increased by cooking. Steaming or microwave cooking retains these phytochemicals somewhat better than boiling.

=== Traditional uses ===
Ancient Romans thought eating the plant would cure mental illness. Twelfth-century mystic Hildegard of Bingen thought eating it steamed and drinking the water would cure jaundice or fever. Watercress was eaten by Native Americans. Some Native Americans used it to treat kidney illnesses and constipation, and it was thought by some to be an aphrodisiac. Early African Americans used the plant as an abortifacient; it was believed to cause sterility as well.

== In culture ==
Hampshire's Watercress Line was named after the plant, a common cargo of that railway.

== See also ==
- Fasciola hepatica
- Fool's watercress – Apium nodiflorum
- Garden cress
- List of vegetables
- Watercress soup
