= William Bradbery =

William Bradbery (11 July 1776 – 11 August 1860), an entrepreneur, was the first person in England to cultivate and sell watercress on a commercial basis.

== Early life ==
William was born in Didcot in Berkshire (now Oxfordshire), he was one of seven children to Thomas and Catherine Bradbery. In 1796 he married Phoebe Whiting in Marcham, Berkshire. Until around 1805 he stayed in the Marcham area, then they moved to Springhead, Northfleet in Kent, where he first started to cultivate watercress.

== Watercress cultivation ==
William's grandson Richard Bradbery at the watercress farm West Hyde

In an article by Henry Bellenden Ker, FRS in 1822, to the London Horticultural Society. He states, "I lately found that watercress is grown in this neighbourhood, by Mr. William Bradbery, for the purpose of supplying the London markets. Mr. Bradbery first began to cultivate the watercress in February 1808, at Northfleet Spring Head, near Gravesend. For this purpose, he procured young plants, and placed them, with a small proportion of the wet earth in which they grew, in shallow running water; the plants soon formed large tufts, and rapidly spread over the water; and he then gathered the cress regularly for the London markets".

"Mr. Bradbery now having left Northfleet last year (1820), began to plant, at a considerable personal expense, beds of the cress, at West Hyde, near Rickmansworth, Hertfordshire. Mr. Bradbery has about five acres of lakes planted with cress. He sends the cress in hampers, each containing eight dozen bunches, to the London markets, every day throughout the year, except Sundays; three days in each week to Covent Garden market, and the other three days to Newgate market. This cultivation of the watercress has insured a constant and regular supply to the metropolis, and the gatherings are received much fresher, and more regularly packed, than those obtained from plants in the wild state; where little selection is made as to the quality, or attention paid to the state of the vegetable, which is usually sent up to town in sacks, and often much bruised and broken before it reaches the retail dealer".

West Hyde proved to be an ideal place to grow the cress, as water bubbled to the surface in a line of springs. The water containing suitable minerals which assisted the growth of the cress. By the mid-19th century, William Bradbery was sending cress to many cities throughout the country, being, Manchester, Liverpool, York, London, Oxford even up to Edinburgh. In the 1841 census return, William described himself as a "Market Gardener", employing 22 workers from West Hyde and surrounding area. He even sent cress to the Great Exhibition of 1851, at The Crystal Palace.

== Retirement ==
William Bradbery's headstone in St Thomas's churchyard

Now residing in some style, he and his wife lived at Corner Hall, in West Hyde, the family home for over 75 years. Having created a substantial business for himself and his family, William retired in his sixties, and let his son Job take over the running of the business, who in turn passed it onto his son, Richard.

William died on 11 August 1860, a little over a month before his wife Phoebe, who died on 19 September 1860. They are buried together in the churchyard of St Thomas, in West Hyde. The watercress business continued on in the ownership of the Bradberys for some years after William died. Richard the grandson, it seems, lacked the same entrepreneurial spirit and drive of his grandfather William. So in 1927, after over a century of cress production, the watercress beds were sold off to another local grower, thus ending the Bradbery dynasty in West Hyde.

== Recognition ==
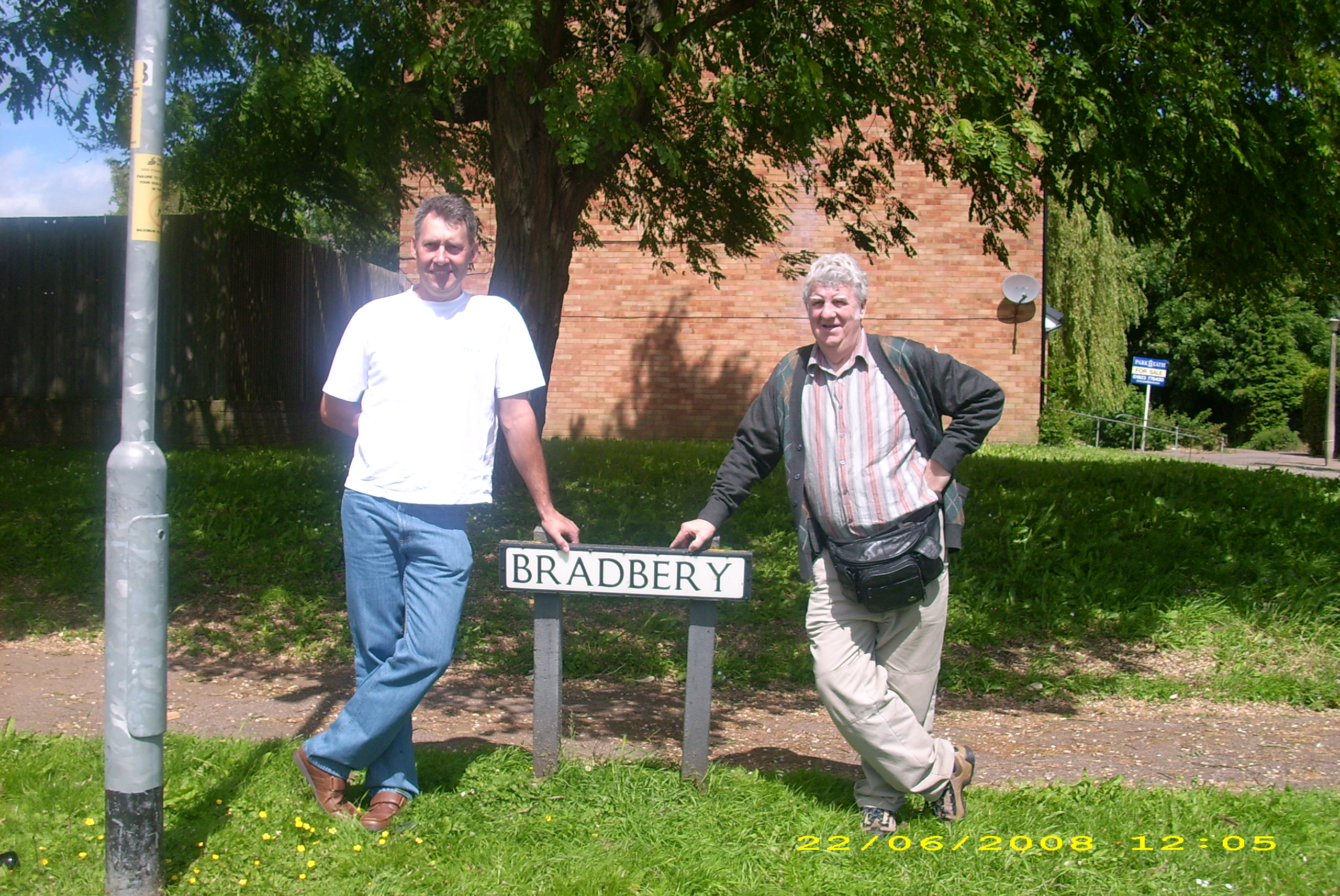
"Bradbery" Maple Cross

In 1960, the Three Rivers District Council, marked the achievements of William and his family, by naming one of the roads in nearby Maple Cross "Bradbery". This was also done in Fulmer, Buckinghamshire, less than four miles (6 km) away, where they named a street "Bradbery Gardens", where William's eldest son Richard, also ran a watercress farm, to complement the one in West Hyde.

== See also ==
- Horticulture
- Watercress Line
