= Rosherville Halt railway station =

Railway Station

Coordinates: 51.4417°N 0.3551°E

Rosherville Halt

General information
- Location: Gravesend, Gravesham, Kent; England
- Grid reference: TQ638740
- Platforms: 2

Other information
- Status: Disused

History
- Pre-grouping: London, Chatham and Dover Railway; South Eastern and Chatham Railway
- Post-grouping: Southern Railway

Key dates
- 10 May 1886: Opened (Rosherville)
- 17 June 1928: Renamed (Rosherville Halt)
- 16 July 1933: Closed
Location

Rosherville Halt was a railway station on the Gravesend West Line which was built to serve the popular Rosherville Gardens, a pleasure garden in Gravesend which closed in 1910. The station survived a further 23 years before itself closing in 1933.

== History ==
The route of the Gravesend West branch through Gravesend adjoined the famous Rosherville Pleasure Gardens which had opened in 1839 on land leased by the Rosher family who gave their name to the popular attraction. Although the Gardens were already served by steamer, the London, Chatham and Dover Railway decided to open a station in the hope of attracting some of their custom. It was an initially successful venture with 14,000 people visiting Rosherville Gardens on Whit Sunday in 1886, many of whom arrived by rail. However, the steamers were not going to give up their passengers without a fight and began to undercut the fares charged by the railway company. In the event, the popularity of Rosherville Gardens was on the wane and it eventually closed in 1910. Dwindling traffic led to the station being downgraded to an unstaffed halt in 1928, before eventually closing in 1933.

As with Southfleet and Longfield stations, Rosherville Halt was situated in a cutting near a road overbridge from which a footbridge led down to a single island platform. Rosherville lay just to the west of a bridge carrying the A226 Dartford - Gravesend road over the line. The covered footbridge complete with two generously wide staircases to accommodate the expected traffic to Rosherville Gardens led from the station buildings at ground level to the platform. Two wooden canopy sections were installed on the platform, and a signal box was installed in a recess in the brick retaining wall on the down side of the station. A stationmaster's house was sited some distance from the main station buildings, overlooking the cutting.

Preceding station	Disused railways	Following station
Southfleet	Southern Railway; Gravesend West Line	Gravesend West

== Post-closure ==
The signal box was removed following closure and the ground level buildings were subsequently converted into domestic use. The platform buildings remained intact until the mid-1960s. The line through the station was closed in 1968 when freight traffic ceased at Gravesend West. What remained was swept away when the trackbed of the Gravesend Branch from Vale Road as far as Gravesend West was converted into the A2260 Thames Way. The cutting was deepened and widened requiring the demolition of the dilapidated stationmaster's house. Only the former railway tunnel to the north-east of the station, now part of the A2260, remains as the surviving remnant of the railway which once served Rosherville.
