= Rosherville Gardens =

Pleasure garden in Kent, England, 1837–1913

Coordinates: 51.4450°N 0.3520°E

- Kent Zoological and Botanical Gardens Institution
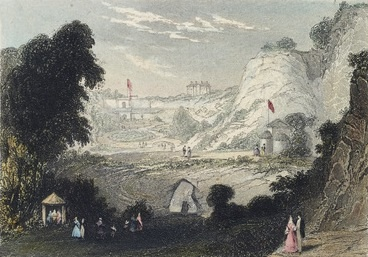
- Colour engraving of Rosherville Gardens, 1841
- Interactive map of Rosherville Gardens
- Type: Pleasure gardens (defunct)
- Location: Northfleet, Kent, England
- Area: 17 acres (6.9 ha)
- Opened: 1837
- Closed: 1913
- Designer: George Jones
- Status: Closed and largely cleared; surviving features Grade II listed
- Public transit: Gravesend West railway station (from 1886)

Rosherville Gardens was a 19th-century pleasure garden in a disused chalk pit in Northfleet, Kent, England. It was laid out in 1837 and finally closed to the public in 1913, just before World War I.

Structures currently still surviving at Rosherville Gardens are a Grade II-listed bear pit, a Grade II-listed clifftop entrance and tunnelled stairway through the cliff, a hermit cave in a chalk grotto, an Italian garden central feature which also formed part of the Broadwalk, and the Grade II-listed Enigmatic Cavern, drawdock and quay which was the river entrance to the gardens.

== The gardens ==
The gardens were laid out in 1837 by George Jones (a businessman from Islington in north London) in one of the disused chalk pits in Northfleet, covering an area of 17 acres (69,000 m^{2}). Their full title was the 'Kent Zoological and Botanical Gardens Institution’.

The gardens were built on a chalk pit owned by Jeremiah Rosher who, from 1830, started building a new town, Rosherville, taking advantage of Gravesend's popularity with Londoners visiting for the day by steamboat along the Thames. They became a favourite destination for thousands of Londoners during good weather, many travelling by paddle steamer down the River Thames to disembark at the pier built to service the gardens.

One of the steamboats from Rosherville Gardens met a horrific accident in 1878. The Princess Alice passenger steamer, after leaving Rosherville pier, was in a collision with the collier Bywell Castle at Tripcock Point, a mile downstream from Woolwich. 640 people died from the collision, 240 being children. An inquest was held at Woolwich, but no conclusive reason was ever established as to the cause of the disaster on the Thames.

At one time the gardens were managed by Barnet Nathan, brother of the musician and 'friend of Byron' Isaac Nathan. Barnet, who was known professionally as 'Baron Nathan' (in mockery of Nathan Rothschild), was renowned for his act of dancing a hornpipe, blind-folded, across a stage laid out with eggs. On his death he merited an obituary in Punch.

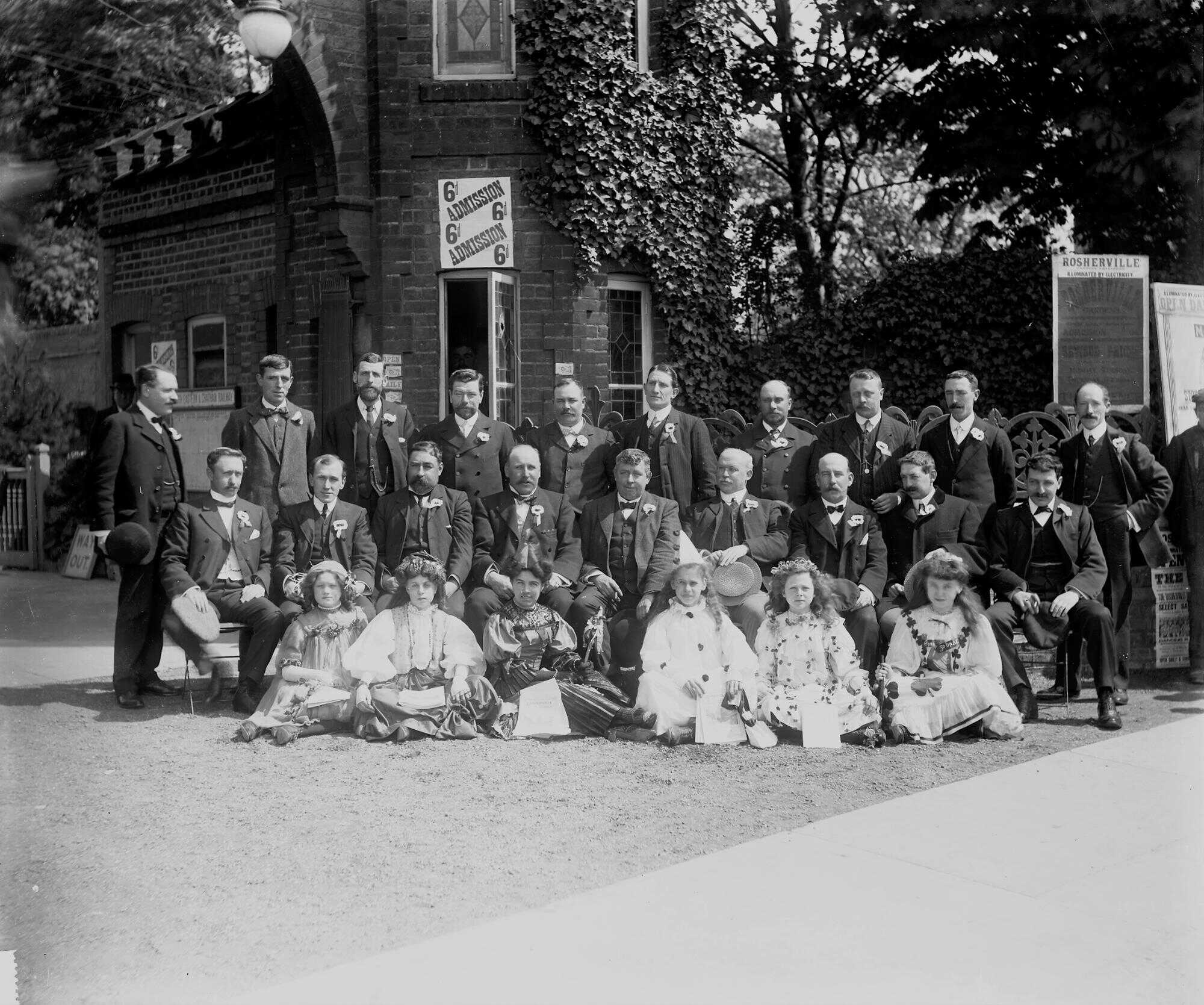
A formally posed group of men and girls at the main entrance, in 1909

In 1886 a nearby railway station opened on the Gravesend West branch railway. However, the advent of the railways led to the gardens' demise, as Londoners were then able to reach coastal resorts such as Margate and Southend.

Robert Hiscock, in his A History of Gravesend (Phillimore, 1976) describes the gardens thus:

They were a place of surpassing beauty and a favourite resort of Londoners. Adorned with small Greek temples and statuary set in the cliffs, there were terraces, an archery lawn, the Bijou theatre, and the Baronial Hall for refreshments, and at one time a lake. At night the gardens were illuminated with thousands of coloured lights and there were fireworks displays and dancing. Famous bands such as the American Sousa were engaged during the season. Blondin, the trapeze artist, performed … In 1857 as many as 20,000 visitors passed through the turnstiles in one week. By 1880 the gardens had reached the peak of their popularity … in 1901 they were closed. During a brief revival 1903-1911, they were used in the making of early films.

== Remains ==
In 2012 during excavation prior to redevelopment, the original bear pit located at the centre of the gardens was exposed, and was Grade II listed in 2014. In 2016, plans for a residential estate on the site proposed to leave the pit buried and commemorate it with a plaque.

Remains of the Cliff Top Entrance designed and built by James Pulham in 1869 survive. The statues seen in some photos were moved to the nearby fountain walk estate, and the front half was sheared off for the development of the factory that was to be built on the site. The staircase that winds through the cliff is intact, with remnants of gas-lighting pipework and an iron handrail can be seen. The original path down was removed, and a metal staircase was installed to allow workers to access the factory during the war.

== In literature ==
Rosherville is mentioned in The Newcomes (vol. 2 chapter 6) by William Makepeace Thackeray, where its Gothic Hall is singled out for its gaudiness.

It is referred to in Francis Burnand and Arthur Sullivan's 1866 comic opera Cox and Box "Visions of Brighton and back, and of ROSHERVILLE, Cheap fare excursions already the squash I feel"

It is referred to in Gilbert & Sullivan's 1877 comic opera "The Sorcerer" Act 2. Mr Wells sings "Hate me! I sometimes go to ROSHERVILLE!", to which Lady Sangazure responds "Love me! that joy I'll share!".

There is the following brief reference in Robert Louis Stevenson's reminiscence of life in Fontainebleau, Fontainebleau Village, from 1882. 'To these last, of course, Fontainebleau will seem but an extended tea-garden: a Rosherville on a by-day'.

It is referred to in P. G. Wodehouse's first Jeeves story, Jeeves Takes Charge: "There is a story about Sir Stanley Gervase-Gervase at Rosherville Gardens which is ghastly in its perfection of detail. It seems that Sir Stanley – but I can't tell you!"

It is also mentioned as a "place to spend a happy day" in chapter 13 of E. Nesbit's The Story of the Amulet.

George Gissing's short story Lou and Liz (1893) is almost entirely set in Rosherville Gardens.

It is further mentioned as "the place whereat to spend a happy day" in Chapter XV of R.S.S. Baden-Powell's 1915 Memories of India.

Mentioned in Michael Sadleir's Fanny by Gaslight, 1940, Constable pp 175–176

In the Henry James story An International Episode Lord Lambeth says to an American tourist, "I wonder you don't go to the Rosherville Gardens." James also mentions the Gardens in his travel piece "London in the Dead Season - September 7, 1878" and describes an excursion he made to visit them.

Footnoted in Anthony Trollope “The Way We Live Now” page 565.

Key scenes in F. Anstey's novella The Tinted Venus take place in Rosherville (called Rosherwich) Gardens, where the statue of the title forms part of the sculpture garden.

“Rosherville” Parts 1 and 2 appear on the 2019 album ‘Depth of Field’ by Kaprekar's Constant. Part 1 tells of the building of the Gardens and how they fell out of favour, Part 2 includes reference to the Princess Alice Disaster
