= Betsham =

Hamlet in Kent, England

Coordinates: 51.42°N 0.3075°E

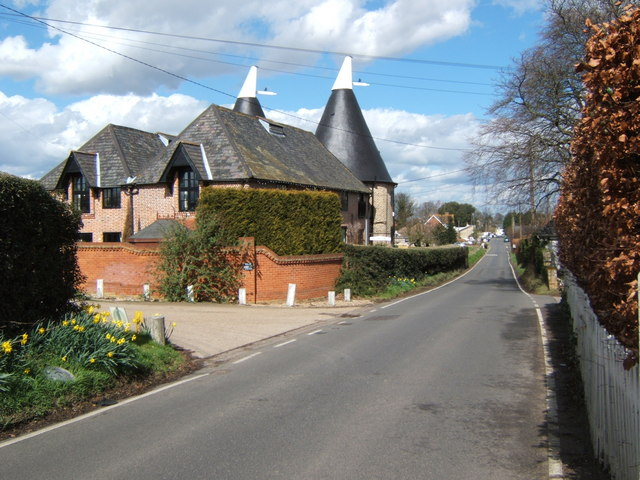
- The Hop House, Betsham

- Location within Kent
- District: Dartford
- Shire county: Kent
- Region: South East
- Country: England
- Sovereign state: United Kingdom
- Post town: Gravesend
- Postcode district: DA13
- Police: Kent
- Fire: Kent
- Ambulance: South East Coast
- UK Parliament: Dartford

Betsham is a hamlet in the parish of Southfleet in Kent, England.

Betsham is a mile north-west from the village of Southfleet, which is situated nearly in the middle of the parish. The hamlet was formerly called Bedesham and lies on the road that leads from Green Street Green (formerly Greensted-green) in the parish of Darenth to Southfleet railway station and thence to Wingfield-bank, Northfleet where it meets the ancient Roman highway Watling Street (A2 motorway), which runs along the northern side of this parish.

Westwood Road links Betsham with Westwood to the south.
