= Sydney Philharmonia Choirs =

Australian choral organisation

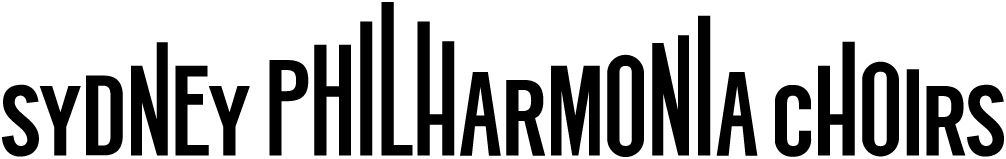
- Current logo

Background information
- Origin: Sydney, Australia
- Genres: classical and contemporary choral music
- Years active: 9 September 1920–present
- Members: Brett Weymark OAM (artistic and musical director)
- Website: www.sydneyphilharmonia.com.au

Sydney Philharmonia Choirs is Australia’s largest choral organisation. It presents its own annual concert series in the Sydney Opera House, Sydney Town Hall, City Recital Hall, and other venues in New South Wales, as well as serving as chorus for the Sydney Symphony Orchestra.

Formed in 1920, it currently consists of the following choirs:

- Sydney Philharmonia Chamber Singers, formerly the Sydney Philharmonia Motet Choir; an auditioned chamber choir of around 32 voices
- Sydney Philharmonia Symphony Chorus; an auditioned choral orchestral choir of 100 voices
- Vox; an auditioned young adult vocal ensemble for 18- to 30-year-olds
- Sydney Philharmonia Festival Chorus; a large community choir of up to 450 voices
- ChorusOz; an un-auditioned choir formed annually to rehearse and perform a single major choral work over the course of a long weekend.
- Christmas Choir; or Messiah Choir – an un-auditioned choir formed annually to rehearse and perform performances of either Handel's Messiah or Carols at the House in December.

== History ==
The choir formed in 1920 as the Hurlstone Park Choral Society and gave its first "Glee Performance", conducted by Tom Downer, on 9 September 1920 in hut 13, Randwick Hospital. The program was listed as "Come where my love lies dreaming", "Great God of wonders", "There is music by the river" and "Sleep, baby, sleep". The first public performance, also conducted by Tom Downer, was on 3 November 1920 at the Masonic Hall, Dulwich Hill, and the program was listed as "Come where my love lies dreaming", "Great God of wonders", "There is music by the river", "Sleep, baby, sleep", "Oh hush thee my baby", "Moonlight", "The bells of St Marys" and "God save the King". The earliest performances to have been noticed in the press were at the Masonic Hall, Dulwich Hill, in 1922 and at St Clement's School Hall, Marrickville, in 1923.

In 1922 the choir gave its first performance of a major choral work, 'Assisting Marrickville Choral Society' in Handel's Messiah. The next performance of Messiah was in 1927, and then annually in a sequence interrupted only in 1933 and 1943, until 2010.

Also in 1927, and continuing to 1939, the society entered Eisteddfods in various NSW locations, winning places on nine occasions. The prize money often had a significant bearing on the organisation's financial situation, which was always precarious. Despite its financial situation, in 1961 the Hurlstone Choral Society felt able to make an unsolicited gift of £50 to its 'major rival', the Sydney Royal Philharmonic Society, which was 'broke and in danger of extinction'.

The choir changed its name to Hurlstone Choral Society in 1937, Sydney Philharmonia Society in 1969 and Sydney Philharmonia Limited in 1974. It employed its first professional manager in 1974.

During this time, Sydney Philharmonia has worked with many conductors, including Eugene Ormandy, Otto Klemperer, Sir Eugene Goosens, Sir David Willcocks, Sir Charles Mackerras, Sir Malcolm Sargent, Sir Granville Bantock, Sir Bernard Heinze, Sir Thomas Beecham, Georg Schnéevoigt, Hans Vonk, Ward Swingle, Zubin Mehta, Christopher Hogwood, Edo de Waart, Charles Dutoit, Mark Elder, John Nelson, Vladimir Ashkenazy, Richard Hickox, and Sir Simon Rattle. The current musical director and chorusmaster is Brett Weymark OAM.

Sydney Philharmonia’s singing commitments have grown to the point where a typical year (2018) sees it perform 12 performances in its own concerts and 20 performances with the Sydney Symphony. Other commitments such as corporate events, commercial concerts and the like mean that the organisation mounts around 50 performances a year.

Sydney Philharmonia Choirs in a formal concert in the Sydney Opera House

Sydney Philharmonia Vox on television show The X Factor

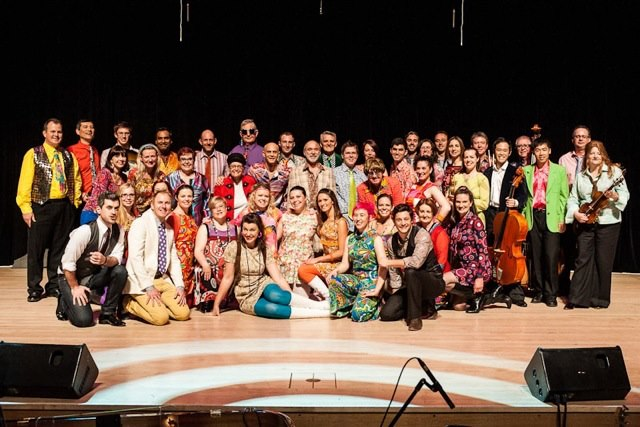
Sydney Philharmonia The Beatles Unplugged ensemble

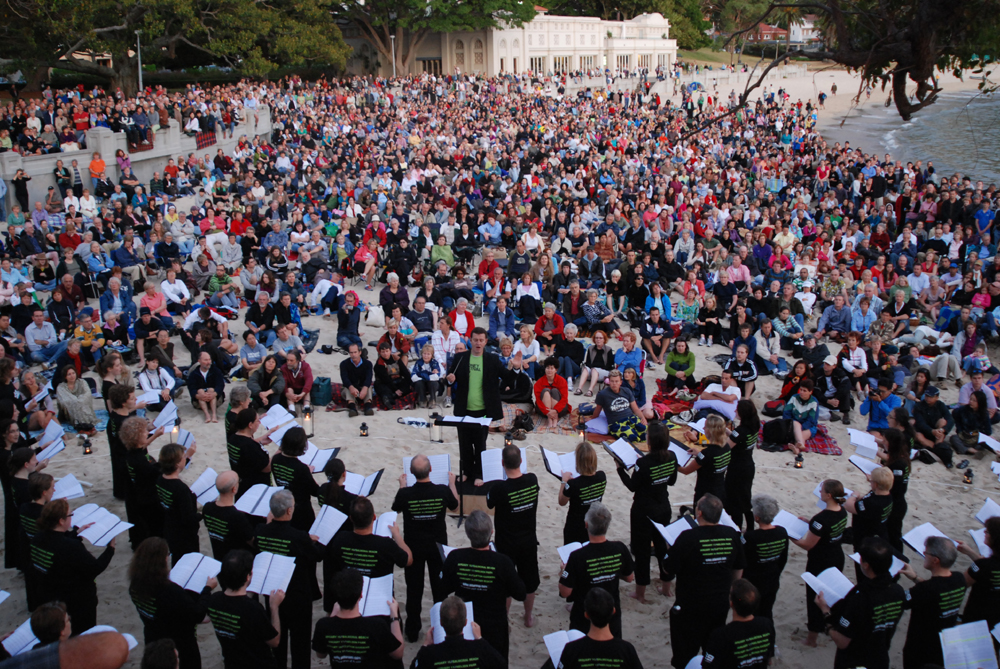
Sydney Philharmonia Choirs in a Dawn Chorus concert

== Civic and community events ==
Sydney Philharmonia has taken part in many civic and community events such as the 1988 bicentennial celebrations and the opening ceremony of the 1998 Winter Olympics in Nagano as part of an international video link. Two years later, in 2000, it performed in both the opening concert Symphony at the Superdome and the live, globally telecast opening ceremony of the 2000 Summer Olympics, singing the Australian national anthem and an excerpt from Hector Berlioz's Te Deum that accompanied the lighting and ascension of the Olympic flame.

Sydney Philharmonia took part in the 2001 centenary of federation celebrations in Sydney and Melbourne and the state memorial for former Prime Minister Gough Whitlam. It performed with the Australian World Orchestra concerts in 2011 and the Doctor Who Symphonic Spectacular in 2012.

== Non-traditional offerings ==
While Sydney Philharmonia has a long history of traditional classical-style choral concert presentation, it has in recent years gone considerably beyond this style in some of its concerts, with some notable success.

- The choir provided backing chorus for Video Games Live in Sydney 2015.
- The choir provided backing chorus for The Rolling Stones in Sydney 2014.
- The Vox chamber ensemble backed Labrinth in his performance of "Earthquake" on the television program The X Factor, 9 October 2012.
- The Beatles Unplugged was the title of an August 2012 concert which featured choral arrangements of Beatles songs with choreography and with costumes evoking the 1960s.
- Purcell's opera King Arthur was presented in 2010 in the City Recital Hall as if it were a 1940s radio play, with Foley artists and an on-stage voice-over artist announcing stage directions. The performers were costumed, but in a 1940s style. This concert was nominated for a Limelight Award.
- The Dawn Chorus concert series in 2009 was a series of four free concerts scheduled for 5:30 am on summer Saturdays on Sydney beaches during the Sydney Festival. These performances attracted audiences of over 7000.

== Touring ==
In 2002, Sydney Philharmonia was the first Australian choir to sing at the BBC Promenade Concert Series, performing Mahler's 8th Symphony under Sir Simon Rattle. In 2010 Sydney Philharmonia celebrated its 90th anniversary with a return to London and a return appearance at the opening night of the Proms, again performing Mahler's 8th Symphony, this time with the BBC Symphony Chorus, Crouch End Festival Chorus and the BBC Symphony Orchestra, conducted by Jiří Bělohlávek.

Sydney Philharmonia has also toured to other parts of the UK, as well as Japan, Korea, Canberra, Hobart, Melbourne, Newcastle (NSW), Orange (NSW) and Perth.

== Awards and nominations ==
=== APRA-AMC Classical Music Awards ===
The APRA-AMC Classical Music Awards are presented annually by Australasian Performing Right Association (APRA) and Australian Music Centre (AMC).

Year	Nominee / work	Award	Result
2004	Berceuse (Gerard Brophy) – Sydney Philharmonia Choirs	Vocal or Choral Work of the Year	Won
2006	Journey to Horseshoe Bend (Andrew Shultz, Gordon Williams) – Ntaria Ladies Choir, Sydney Philharmonia Motet Choir, Sydney Symphony	Best Performance of an Australian Composition	Nominated

=== Helpmann Awards ===
The Helpmann Awards, presented annually, recognise distinguished achievement in the Australian performing arts.

Year	Nominee / work	Award	Result
2010	Oedipus Rex & Symphony of Psalms (Igor Stravinsky) – Sydney Festival with the Sydney Symphony and the Sydney Philharmonia Choirs	Best Symphony Orchestra Concert	Won

== Recordings ==
- Wesley-Smith, Martin; Wesley-Smith, Peter (1991). Boojum! : nonsense, truth and Lewis Carroll, a musical (CD). Vox Australis. ASIN B00004KH7F. Catalog no. VAST 010-2.
- Missa solemnis (CD). ABC Classics. 1992. 434 722-2.
- Page, Jimmy; Plant, Robert (1992). Stairways to Heaven (CD). Triple J Music.
- Sydney Philharmonia Choir; Sydney Philharmonia Motet Choir (2000). Ode to Joy – great choral masterpieces (CD). ABC. 465 684-2.
- An Australian Christmas (CD catalogue record). Australian Broadcasting Corporation. 1995. 446 975-2 – via Trove.
- Choral symphony, Symphony no. 4.2 Piano concerto (CD). Australian Broadcasting Corporation : Universal Music Group [distributor]. 2000. 456 698-2.
- Streisand, Barbra (2000). Timeless: Live in Concert (CD liner). Columbia Records. ASIN B00004HYMR. Catalog no. 63778. (The choir performed live in two concerts as part of Streisand's Timeless: Live in Concert Tour.)
- Various (2000). The Games Of The XXVII Olympiad: Official Music From The Opening Ceremony (CD). Sony Music, BMG Australia. ASIN B00004Z1CY. 5005345000.
- Journey to Horseshoe Bend, a cantata based on the novel by TGH Strehlow (CD). Australian Broadcasting Corporation. 2004. ABC 476 2266. A recording of a performance on 28 May 2003 at the Sydney Opera House.
- Tavener, John; Josey, Christopher; Rozario, Patricia; Sydney Philharmonia Choir (2004). Lament for Jerusalem a mystical love song (CD). Australian Broadcasting Corporation. ABC 476 160-5.
- Nathan, Isaac; Mackerras, Charles; Weymark, Brett; Briger, Alex; Sydney Philharmonia Chamber Singers; Australian Broadcasting Corporation (2011). Don John of Austria, Australia's first opera. ABC Classics. 4764114. A recording of performances on 18 and 20 October 2007 at the City Recital Hall Angel Place in Sydney.
- Australian National Anthem CD.

== Movies and television ==
- Captain Thunderbolt (1953)
- The Black Robe (1991)
- Strictly Ballroom (1992)
- The Money or the Gun (1990). Segment on the television program singing Led Zeppelin's "Stairway to Heaven".
- The Adventures of Priscilla, Queen of the Desert (1994)
- On the Beach (2000)
- Australian National Anthem DVD
- Happy Feet (2006)
- Australia (2008)
- Knowing (2009)
- First Night of the Proms: Symphony of a Thousand (2010)
