= Longfield Halt railway station =

Former railway station in England

Coordinates: 51.4051°N 0.2977°E

Longfield Halt
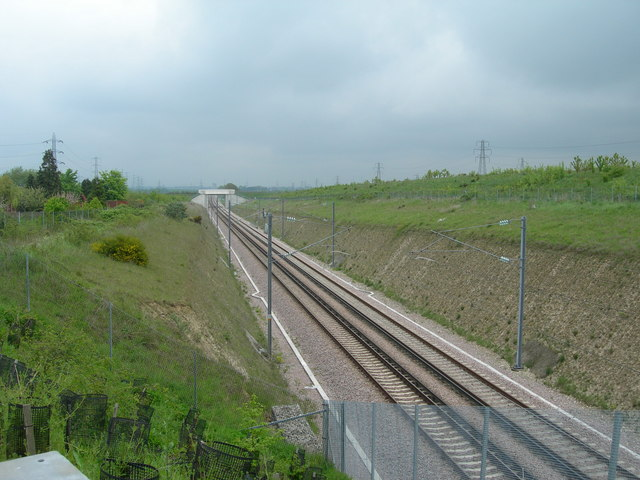
- Site of Longfield Halt, now part of the Channel Tunnel Rail Link

General information
- Location: Grubb Street, Dartford, Kent; England
- Grid reference: TQ599698
- Platforms: 2

Other information
- Status: Disused

History
- Pre-grouping: South Eastern and Chatham Railway
- Post-grouping: Southern Railway; Southern Region of British Railways

Key dates
- 1 July 1913: Opened
- 3 August 1953: Closed
Location

Longfield Halt (also known as Longfield Halt for Pinden and Westwood) was a railway station on the Gravesend West Line which served the settlement of Grubb Street in Kent, England.

== History ==
The line was opened 1886 but it was not until 1913 that the station was opened as part of a drive by the South Eastern and Chatham Railway (SECR) to cut costs and increase revenues on the Gravesend West branch. Longfield Halt was now the first station on the line and was situated ¾ mile from Fawkham Junction in a chalk cutting just to the south-west of a road bridge carrying Whitehill Road over the line.

The station was constructed entirely of wood, with access being had from a staircase leading down from the overbridge. Its opening coincided with the introduction by the SECR of push-pull trains, initially worked by H class 0-4-4Ts with ex-South Eastern Railway 4 wheel coaches, running between Swanley Junction and Gravesend West Street. Although ultimately never successful, the line began to suffer in the face of competition from local bus services following the Second World War, and freight dropped off. The decision was therefore made to close all stations on the branch line to passenger traffic as from 3 August 1953. In 1959, the line was singled and the platform buildings at Longfield Halt were demolished along with those at neighbouring Southfleet. The line running through Longfield remained open for freight until 1976, and the track remained even as late as 1985.

Preceding station	Disused railways	Following station
Farningham Road; Line and station open	British Railways; Southern Region; Gravesend West Line	Southfleet; Line partially open, station closed

== Present day ==
The site of Longfield Halt has been incorporated into the Channel Tunnel Rail Link (CTRL) which runs from London through Kent to the British side of the Channel Tunnel. Works on the CTRL commenced in 1998 with the lifting of the remaining track on the Gravesend Branch and the excavation of a new trackbed. CTRL services followed the alignment of the Gravesend Branch as far as Fawkham Junction where they joined the Chatham Main Line to proceed to Waterloo. CTRL trains ceased using this route in 2007 when trains were diverted to St. Pancras. The line is still occasionally used for empty stock trains.
