= Don John of Austria (opera) =

Ballad opera by Isaac Nathan

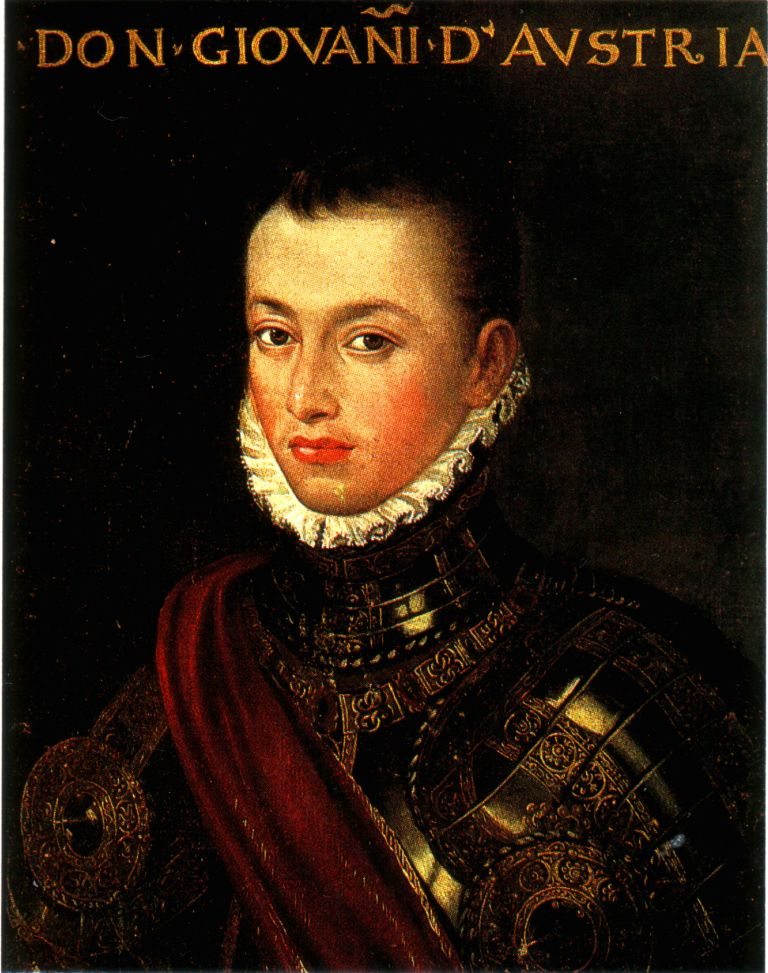
A portrait of the historical figure John of Austria

Don John of Austria is a ballad opera in three acts by Isaac Nathan to a libretto by Jacob Levi Montefiore. It is the first opera to be written, composed and produced in Australia.

Quote from the opera's title page:

The plot is taken and many scenes are literal translations from Casimir Delavigne's celebrated comedy of "Don John of Austria" (Don Juan d'Autriche).

== Performance history ==
It premiered on 3 May 1847 at the Royal Victoria Theatre, Sydney and enjoyed a successful run of six performances.

It has been produced only twice since: two performances (12 and 14 September 1997) at Spitalfields, London, by Spitalfields Market Opera with The Chelsea Opera Group directed by Philip Parr and conducted by Alexander Briger, and semi-staged performances on 18 and 20 October 2007 – in two acts – at the City Recital Hall, Angel Place, Sydney, also conducted by Briger.

Nathan's original orchestration has been lost and Nathan's great-great-great grandson, the conductor Sir Charles Mackerras, created a new orchestration. Alexander Briger is a nephew of Mackerras, and Nathan's great-great-great-great grandson.

== Synopsis ==
Nathan’s fast-paced opera tells of the rivalry in love of Philip II of Spain and his illegitimate half-brother Don John of Austria.

The libretto follows Delavigne's 1835 Don Juan d'Autriche fairly closely, except for the addition of a scene near the end with Agnes alone, where she sings "They tell us that a home of light there is, where praying seraphs glow".

In fact the opera's plot is in many ways an inversion of Fromental Halévy's opera La Juive (libretto by Eugène Scribe). In the latter, the male lover is precluded from having an affair with his inamorata because she is Jewish, whilst he is a high-born Christian; later it turns out that she was Christian all along, but all ends tragically. In Don John, in a similar situation, it turns out that the 'high-born Christian' is in fact of Jewish descent, and all ends happily.

== Roles ==
- Don John of Austria, illegitimate son of Charles V (tenor)
- Donna Agnes, secretly a Jew, also known as Miriam, John's beloved (soprano)
- Philip II of Spain, King, legitimate son of Charles/Carlos, disguised as the Count de Santa Fiore, also in love with Agnes (baritone)
- Don Quexada, former Prime Minister (bass-baritone)
- Dorothy, Agnes' servant (mezzo-soprano)
- Chorus
  - Speaking roles:
  - Brother Carlos, formerly Charles V of Spain
  - Don Ruy de Gomes, Philip's Prime Minister
  - Domingo, Don Quexada's servant
  - Antonio, Brother Carlos' servant
  - Jerome, Don Quexada's servant
  - Don Ferdinand de Valdes, Grand Inquisitor
  - Lords in Waiting, Officers, Alguazils, Monks and Attendants

== Recordings ==
- 1996: "Overture", "The days are gone when Judah's voice"
- 2011: (Complete performance) Steve Davislim (Don John), Cheryl Barker (Donna Anna), Grant Doyle (Philip II), Paul Whelan (Don Quaxada), Sally-Anne Russell (Dorothy), Alexander Briger (conductor), Sydney Philharmonia Chamber Singers, Sydney Symphony Orchestra; ABC Classics Cat. No.: 4764114
