= Southfleet railway station =

Former railway station in England

Coordinates: 51.4239°N 0.3204°E

Southfleet

General information
- Location: Southfleet, Dartford, Kent; England
- Grid reference: TQ615720
- Platforms: 2

Other information
- Status: Disused

History
- Pre-grouping: London, Chatham and Dover Railway; South Eastern and Chatham Railway
- Post-grouping: Southern Railway; Southern Region of British Railways

Key dates
- 10 May 1886: Opened
- 3 August 1953: Closed for passengers
- 1976: closed completely
Location

Southfleet (also known as Southfleet for Springhead) was a railway station on the Gravesend West Line which served the small village of Southfleet in Kent, England.

== Opening ==
Southfleet, the only village of any size between Longfield and Gravesend, was the first stop on the London, Chatham and Dover Railway's Gravesend branch line. The line skirted the western boundary of the village, passing under two overbridges before reaching the station site just to the north of the present day B262 Station Road. The station was actually sited some distance from the village from which it took its name, being at a midway point between Southfleet village and the hamlet of Springhead. It was equipped with an island platform and provided with both passenger and freight facilities - a goods shed and goods yard with 5-ton crane - together with a signal box. The station accounted for the majority of the line's freight which comprised fruit and agricultural products, particularly blackberries picked in the area.

Architecturally, the station's buildings were similar in style to those at Gravesend West, solidly-built of yellow London stock in a slightly Gothic style. A house was provided for the stationmaster - a Victorian villa - near to which were four semi-detached railway cottages. All the main station buildings were on the island platform, meaning that no platform tickets were issued as it was necessary to enter the platform in order to purchase a ticket.

== Decline and closure ==
Although ultimately never successful, the Gravesend branch began to suffer in the face of competition from local bus services following the Second World War, and freight dropped off. As an economy measure, Southfleet lost its status as a station and became an unstaffed halt in Spring 1953. Worse was to follow a few months later when the decision was made to close all stations on the line to passenger traffic as from 3 August 1953. In 1959, the branch was singled and the platform buildings at Southfleet were demolished along with those at neighbouring Longfield Halt. Following the withdrawal of freight services at Gravesend West station in March 1968, the line was cut back to a point approximately 1100 yards to the north of Southfleet (as far as a bridge over the A2), the track beyond that point being lifted.

A coal railhead was subsequently established at Southfleet by APCM, a long-term user of the line, to which coal would be delivered by rail from the Midlands and then transported by road to Gravesend. The depot closed in 1970 following the opening of a centralised APCM plant at Northfleet. A brief revival took place in 1974 when the APCM took a lease of the former goods yard at Southfleet, constructed a small prefabricated engine shed and laid out sidings. The 1100 yards of track remaining beyond Southfleet was used to store wagons; the depot saw relatively frequent services - 4 up and down per day during the winter of 1974–5. APCM's use of the depot ceased in 1976, yet the track remained extant even as late as 1985.

Preceding station	Disused railways	Following station
Longfield Halt; Line and station closed	Southern Railway; Gravesend West Line	Rosherville Halt; Line and station closed
Longfield Halt; Line and station closed	British Railways; Southern Region; Gravesend West Line	Gravesend West; Line and station closed

== Present day ==
Part of the trackbed to the south of Southfleet has been incorporated into the Channel Tunnel Rail Link (CTRL) which runs from London through Kent to the British side of the Channel Tunnel. From Fawkham Junction, the CTRL reuses the Gravesend West trackbed as far as the Dale Road overbridge near the site of Southfleet station, where it heads east on a new course. Works on the CTRL commenced in 1998 with the lifting of the remaining track on the Gravesend Branch and the excavation of a new trackbed.

The remainder of the cutting between Dale Road and the B262 Station Road was infilled as part of the works on the CTRL, with the overbridge surviving with rebuilt parapets. A tennis court now occupies the site of the station and new housing has been constructed in the former station yard. The stationmaster's house survives intact nearby as a private residence.
