= Barnett Nathan =

English impresario and entertainer

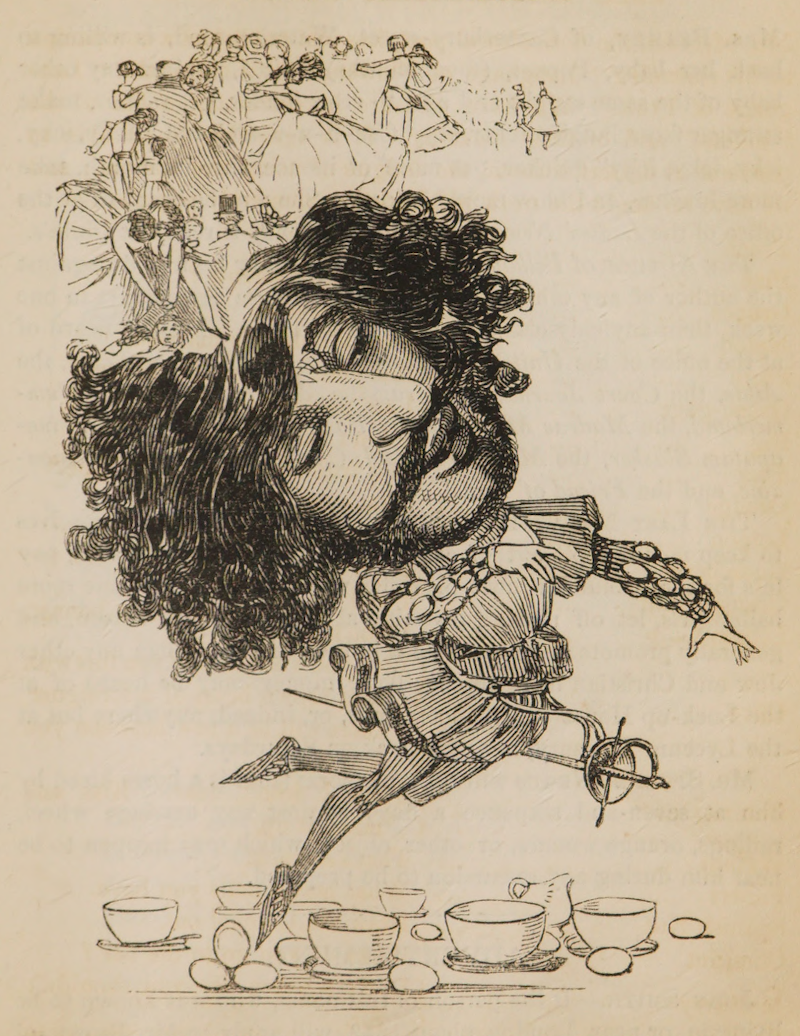
- Caricature of Nathan from the satirical magazine The Man in the Moon (1847)
- Born: 1793; Canterbury, Great Britain
- Died: 6 December 1856 (aged 62–63); London, United Kingdom
- Burial place: Bancroft Road Jewish Cemetery, Covent Garden
- Other name: Baron of Rosherville
- Spouse: Caroline Buckley (m. 1816)
- Relatives: Isaac Nathan (brother)

Barnett Nathan (1793 – 6 December 1856), known professionally as Baron Nathan, was an English impresario, entertainer, and dancing master. He acted for many years as master of ceremonies and managing director at Rosherville Gardens.

== Biography ==
Barnett Nathan was born in Canterbury, the youngest child of Jewish parents Mary (née Goldsmid) and Menachem Mona (or Muna), and was given the Hebrew name Baruch ben Menachem. His Polish-born father was cantor of the local synagogue. Barnett's elder brother, Isaac Nathan, would come to be an accomplished musician and composer, and one sister would become a professional harpist. On 6 July 1816, he eloped with Caroline Buckley of Bristol, the sister of Isaac's second wife.

A venture into music publishing with Isaac ended in bankruptcy, and Nathan became a dancing instructor in Kennington. There he opened a dance academy, and from 1834 he led dancing at the Tivoli Gardens in Margate. In 1842, he was permanently installed as master of ceremonies and managing director at Rosherville Gardens in Gravesend, Kent, where he spent every summer until his death. On his benefit nights he would perform his famous 'egg dance', which consisted of dancing the hornpipe blindfolded on a stage that was covered in eggs and teaware.

He died at his home on 6 December 1856 from the rupture of a blood vessel in the head, and was buried at the Bancroft Road Jewish Cemetery in Covent Garden.

== Parodies ==
Nathan was a well-known personality, who was frequently parodied in the satirical magazines Diogenes, The Puppet-Show, The Comic Almanack, and Punch. In Robin Hood and Richard Cœur de Lion, an opera burlesque by Joachim Hayward Stocqueler, Shirley Brooks, and Charles Kenney, the titular character declares:

This ready courtesy's beyond belief.
A handsome hall! Baron, I vow you will
Eclipse your peer, the Lord of Rosherville,
The dancing nobleman, whose power we see
Makes even gents dance almost decently.
