= Alexander Briger =

Australian conductor

Alexander Briger AO
- Born: Andrew Alexander Briger; Sydney, Australia
- Occupation: Classical conductor
- Website: alexanderbriger.com

(Andrew) Alexander Briger AO (born 1969) is an Australian classical conductor. He is the nephew of the conductor Sir Charles Mackerras, and is a direct descendant of the composer Isaac Nathan and Count Felix Sumarokov-Elston.

== Biography ==
Alexander Briger was born in Sydney and attended the Sydney Grammar School, where his uncle Alastair Mackerras was the headmaster. He had his first violin lessons there. He was inspired to become a conductor at age 12, when he saw another uncle, Sir Charles Mackerras, conduct the Sydney Symphony Orchestra in Mahler's Fourth Symphony. He left Grammar in 1987, then continued his violin studies at the Sydney Conservatorium of Music. In 1991 he went to the Richard Strauss Conservatorium in Munich to undertake a post-graduate degree in conducting. He won first prize at the International Competition for Conductors in the Czech Republic in 1993. He won the right to study under Pierre Boulez at the Aix-en-Provence Festival in 2000. He has since worked extensively with Boulez and with Sir Charles Mackerras. Boulez introduced Briger to Sir Simon Rattle, who invited him to conduct the City of Birmingham Symphony Orchestra. He and his family moved to London in 1998 and he now lives in Paris.

In 2002 he filled in for the scheduled conductor of the Philharmonia Orchestra, who was taken ill. He also appeared at the BBC Proms and the Berlin Festival with the Birmingham Contemporary Music Group that year. He was invited to take the London Philharmonic Orchestra on a tour of China in 2004. That same year he conducted Britten's The Rape of Lucretia at Covent Garden, becoming only the fourth Australian to conduct there, after Mackerras, Richard Bonynge and Simone Young. He also conducted Mozart's The Magic Flute at the Glyndebourne Festival. In 2005 he made his debut with the Orchestre de Paris.

Briger's work with Opera Australia includes Jenůfa, Madama Butterfly, Così fan tutte, The Cunning Little Vixen, The Marriage of Figaro, and Britten's A Midsummer Night's Dream. He has also led La bohème and Carmen for the State Opera of South Australia.

He conducted Don John of Austria, Australia's first opera, written by his great-great-great-great-grandfather Isaac Nathan, in its first performance since Nathan's time. This was a concert performance in 1997, arranged by Sir Charles Mackerras (Nathan's great-great-great-grandson). He has since recorded the work on CD.

His overseas operatic work includes The Rape of Lucretia (Royal Opera House, Covent Garden), Rigoletto and The Makropulos Case (English National Opera), The Cunning Little Vixen (Aix-en-Provence Festival), The Magic Flute (Glyndebourne Festival), From the House of the Dead (Canadian Opera Company), The Tales of Hoffmann (Royal Danish Opera), The Bartered Bride (Royal Swedish Opera), The Queen of Spades (Komische Oper Berlin), Nixon in China and I Was Looking at the Ceiling and Then I Saw the Sky (Théâtre du Châtelet, Paris), I Was Looking at the Ceiling and Then I Saw the Sky (Teatro dell’Opera di Roma), Katya Kabanova and The Magic Flute (Toulon Opera) and the Bartók ballets The Miraculous Mandarin and The Wooden Prince (Opéra national du Rhin).

The list of other orchestras Alexander Briger has conducted includes the London Symphony Orchestra, London Philharmonic Orchestra, Philharmonia Orchestra, BBC Symphony Orchestra, BBC Scottish Symphony Orchestra, Royal Liverpool Philharmonic, Academy of St Martin in the Fields, London Sinfonietta, City of Birmingham Symphony Orchestra, Birmingham Contemporary Music Group, Liverpool Philharmonic Orchestra, Bournemouth Symphony Orchestra, Orchestra of the Age of Enlightenment, Scottish Chamber Orchestra, Hanover Band, Orchestra of the Welsh National Opera, RTE Orchestra, Dublin, Orchestre de Paris, Orchestre Philharmonique de Radio France, Orchestre Philharmonique de Strasbourg, Ensemble InterContemporain, Paris Chamber Orchestra, Monte-Carlo Philharmonic Orchestra, Orchestre National du Capitole de Toulouse, Konzerthausorchester Berlin, Frankfurt Radio Orchestra, Deutsche Kammerphilharmonie Bremen, SWR Sinfonieorchester, Stuttgart, Nordwestdeutscherundfunk Orchester, Gothenburg Symphony Orchestra, Swedish Radio Symphony Orchestra, Rotterdam Philharmonic Orchestra, Danish Symphony Orchestra, Belgium National Orchestra, Flemish Radio Symphony, Mozarteum Orchestra Salzburg, Camerata Salzburg, Japanese Virtuoso Symphony Orchestra, Malaysian Philharmonic Orchestra, Beijing Symphony Orchestra and Orquesta Nacional do Porto.

In his native Australia he has conducted the Sydney, Melbourne, Adelaide, West Australian, Queensland and Tasmanian symphony orchestras.

In 2010 he launched the Australian World Orchestra, a project to bring leading expatriate Australian orchestral players from around the world home to Australia to play together with the leading resident players in a single ensemble. In 2011 he conducted their award-winning inaugural season at the Sydney Opera House with Beethoven's 9th Symphony, which was subsequently released on Deutsche Grammophon. He is currently chief conductor and artistic director of the Australian World Orchestra.

In 2016 Alexander Briger was appointed an Officer of the Order of Australia (AO) "for services to the arts as a leading international conductor and founder of the AWO".

He is currently working on an opera in the Opera Of Lausanne that is The Turn of The Screw.

== Premieres ==
Alexander Briger's premieres include:

- Arvo Pärt's Lamentate (London Sinfonietta/Hélène Grimaud)
- Simon Holt's Who put Bella in the Wych'elm (Aldeburgh Festival and Almeida Opera)
- Elena Kats-Chernin's The Witching Hour Concerto for 8 Double Basses (Australian World Orchestra)
- Bruno Mantovani's 6 Orchestral Pieces (Orchestre de Paris)
- Liza Lim's The Compass, for didgeridoo and flute
- James Ledger's Arcs and Planes
- works by Mark-Anthony Turnage

== Personal life ==
Briger's wife, Caroline Meng, is a French mezzo-soprano, and they have one daughter, Charlotte. He has three daughters from a previous marriage, Claudia, Sofia and Scarlett.

== Awards and nominations ==
=== ARIA Music Awards ===
The ARIA Music Awards is an annual awards ceremony held by the Australian Recording Industry Association. They commenced in 1987.

Year	Nominee / work	Award	Result	Ref.
2011	Don John of Austria (with Sydney Symphony Orchestra)	Best Original Soundtrack, Cast or Show Album	Nominated	
