= Westwood, Southfleet =

Hamlet in Kent, England

Coordinates: 51.4107°N 0.2965°E

Westwood
- Location within Kent
- OS grid reference: TQ5980670468
- District: Dartford
- Shire county: Kent
- Region: South East
- Country: England
- Sovereign state: United Kingdom
- Post town: Gravesend
- Postcode district: DA13
- Police: Kent
- Fire: Kent
- Ambulance: South East Coast
- UK Parliament: Dartford

Westwood is a hamlet in the parish of Southfleet in Kent, England, in the west of the parish.

It is one mile west of the village of Southfleet. In the 19th century it was one of only two hamlets within the parish (the other being Betsham, in addition to the main village).

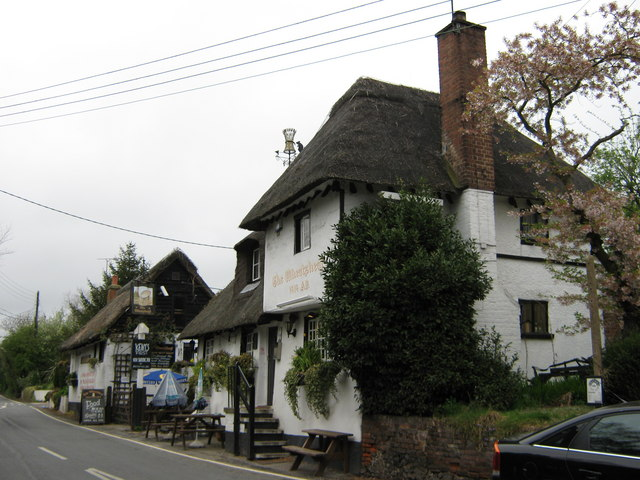
Wheatsheaf Public House in Westwood

It lies around the crossroads formed by the Westwood Road (which leads to Betsham), Highcross Road (leads to Bean), Whitehall Road (leads to Longfield), and Hook Green Road (leads to Southfleet village). The Wheatsheaf Public House, near the crossroads, is a Grade II Listed Building. This dates from 15th – 16th century and is a timber-framed building, faced with plaster, with a hipped thatched roof. Nearby is Westwood farm.

A quarter of a mile to the south lies the site of the former Longfield Halt railway station.
