= Listed buildings in Southfleet =

Civil Parish in Kent, England

Southfleet is a village and civil parish in the Borough of Dartford of Kent, England. It contains one grade I, three grade II* and 39 grade II listed buildings that are recorded in the National Heritage List for England.

This list is based on the information retrieved online from Historic England.

== Key ==
Grade	Criteria
I	Buildings that are of exceptional interest
II*	Particularly important buildings of more than special interest
II	Buildings that are of special interest

== Listing ==
Name	Grade	Location	Type	Completed (Note: The date given is the date used by Historic England as significant for the initial building or that of an important part in the structure's description.)	Date designated	Grid ref. (Note: The grid reference is based on the British national grid reference system, sometimes known as OSGB36, used by the Ordnance Survey.) Geo-coordinates	Notes	Entry number (Note: The "List Entry Number" is a unique number assigned to each listed building and scheduled monument by Historic England.)	Image	Wikidata
Wall Running South from South East Corner of Hook Place, and Gazebo at South End of Wall	II	And Gazebo At South End Of Wall, Hook Green Road			17 March 1982	TQ6117770468; 51°24′37″N 0°18′58″E		1085830	Upload Photo	Q26374469
Tudor Cottage	II	Brakefield Road			17 March 1982	TQ6172670599; 51°24′41″N 0°19′27″E		1336465	Upload Photo	Q26620954
Church Cottages	II	1, 2 and 3, Church Street			17 March 1982	TQ6140371126; 51°24′58″N 0°19′11″E		1124185	Upload Photo	Q26417263
Church House	II	Church Street			17 March 1982	TQ6142371129; 51°24′58″N 0°19′12″E		1085822	Upload Photo	Q26374435
Church of St Nicholas	I	Church Street			1 June 1967	TQ6137671163; 51°24′59″N 0°19′10″E		1337465	Church of St Nicholas More images	Q17529684
Garden Wall to South and East of the Limes Fronting Road, from the Outbuilding to South of Hook Green Farmhouse to the Barn at Hook Green Farm	II	From The Outbuilding To South Of Hook Green Farmhouse To The Barn At Hook Green Farm, Hook Green Road			17 March 1982	TQ6114370607; 51°24′42″N 0°18′57″E		1336453	Upload Photo	Q26620942
34, Highcross Road	II	34, Highcross Road			30 April 1981	TQ5980670468; 51°24′39″N 0°17′47″E		1085824	Upload Photo	Q26374443
Barn Approximately 70 Metres to North of No 34	II	Highcross Road			30 April 1981	TQ5981470534; 51°24′41″N 0°17′48″E		1085826	Upload Photo	Q26374454
Granary Approximately 15 Metres North of No 34	II	Highcross Road			30 April 1981	TQ5979770486; 51°24′39″N 0°17′47″E		1085825	Upload Photo	Q26374448
Ivy House	II	Highcross Road			17 March 1982	TQ5969770599; 51°24′43″N 0°17′42″E		1085823	Upload Photo	Q26374439
Stables Approximately 20 Metres to North of No 34	II	Highcross Road			30 April 1981	TQ5980670498; 51°24′40″N 0°17′47″E		1337000	Upload Photo	Q26621457
Stables Approximately 60 Metres to North of No 34	II	Highcross Road			30 April 1981	TQ5978270529; 51°24′41″N 0°17′46″E		1337001	Upload Photo	Q26621458
Wheatsheaf Cottage	II	Highcross Road, DA13 9PH			17 March 1982	TQ5994970354; 51°24′35″N 0°17′54″E		1336999	Upload Photo	Q26621456
Hook Green Barn	II	1, Hook Green Barn, Hook Green Road, DA13 9NQ			17 March 1982	TQ6109570606; 51°24′42″N 0°18′54″E		1085797	Upload Photo	Q26374329
Court Lodge Farmhouse	II	Hook Green Road			1 August 1952	TQ6134571127; 51°24′58″N 0°19′08″E		1336451	Upload Photo	Q26620940
Former Barn Range with Hop Kilns Approximately 40 Metres to South of Hook Green Farmhouse	II	Hook Green Road, DA13 9NQ			17 March 1982	TQ6118570693; 51°24′44″N 0°18′59″E		1336452	Upload Photo	Q26620941
Friary Court Friary Court and Old Friary Old Friary	II*	Hook Green Road			1 August 1952	TQ6127470866; 51°24′50″N 0°19′04″E		1085828	Upload Photo	Q17557322
Granary Approximately 40 Metres to South of Court Lodge Farmhouse	II	Hook Green Road			1 August 1952	TQ6135771087; 51°24′57″N 0°19′08″E		1085794	Upload Photo	Q26374318
Granary at Hook Green Farm Approximately 100 Metres to South West of the Limes	II	Hook Green Road			17 March 1982	TQ6104370598; 51°24′42″N 0°18′51″E		1336454	Upload Photo	Q26620943
Hook Place	II	Hook Green Road			1 June 1967	TQ6116770538; 51°24′39″N 0°18′58″E		1336466	Upload Photo	Q26620955
Privies Block to East of the Limes	II	Hook Green Road			17 March 1982	TQ6115570682; 51°24′44″N 0°18′57″E		1085796	Upload Photo	Q26374323
Sedley's Church of England Primary School and Gateway	II	Hook Green Road			1 August 1952	TQ6141571098; 51°24′57″N 0°19′11″E		1085793	Upload Photo	Q26374313
The Limes	II*	Hook Green Road			1 June 1967	TQ6114370664; 51°24′44″N 0°18′57″E		1085795	Upload Photo	Q17557311
Weavers Cottages	II	1 and 2, Hook Green Road			17 March 1982	TQ6121570618; 51°24′42″N 0°19′00″E		1085829	Upload Photo	Q26374464
Scadbury Cottage	II	New Barn Road			17 March 1982	TQ6215171197; 51°25′00″N 0°19′50″E		1085799	Upload Photo	Q26374338
Scadbury Manor	II	New Barn Road			17 March 1982	TQ6206471278; 51°25′02″N 0°19′45″E		1099222	Upload Photo	Q26391375
The Pest House in the Garden of Scadbury Manor to South West of the House	II	New Barn Road			1 June 1967	TQ6202371251; 51°25′02″N 0°19′43″E		1099203	Upload Photo	Q26391356
Garden Walls to East, North and West of Scadbury Manor Running to the Pest House	II	North And West Of Scadbury Manor Running To The Pest House, New Barn Road			1 June 1967	TQ6206671319; 51°25′04″N 0°19′46″E		1336455	Upload Photo	Q26620944
North End Farmhouse	II	Park Corner Road			17 March 1982	TQ6064671954; 51°25′26″N 0°18′33″E		1099179	Upload Photo	Q26391330
Chapter Farmhouse	II*	Red Street			1 June 1967	TQ6168470794; 51°24′47″N 0°19′25″E		1085800	Chapter Farmhouse More images	Q17557316
Granary to South East of Halls Cottage	II	Red Street			17 March 1982	TQ6175870760; 51°24′46″N 0°19′29″E		1085803	Upload Photo	Q26374354
Halls Cottage	II	Red Street			17 March 1982	TQ6174470769; 51°24′46″N 0°19′28″E		1099156	Upload Photo	Q26391307
Old Ship Cottage	II	Red Street			17 March 1982	TQ6145170998; 51°24′54″N 0°19′13″E		1085801	Upload Photo	Q26374343
Red Street House	II	Red Street			17 March 1982	TQ6169570778; 51°24′47″N 0°19′25″E		1085802	Upload Photo	Q26374348
Wastdale	II	Red Street			17 March 1982	TQ6205270729; 51°24′45″N 0°19′44″E		1099162	Upload Photo	Q26391314
Joyce Hall	II	Station Road			17 March 1982	TQ6067871514; 51°25′12″N 0°18′34″E		1085804	Upload Photo	Q26374358
V Shaped Garden Wall to North of Joyce Hall	II	Station Road			17 March 1982	TQ6068071566; 51°25′13″N 0°18′34″E		1349050	Upload Photo	Q26632373
Danetre Fiveways Southfleet Post Office	II	Warren Road			17 March 1982	TQ6145971122; 51°24′58″N 0°19′14″E		1085805	Upload Photo	Q26374363
The Ship Inn	II	Warren Road			17 March 1982	TQ6144671095; 51°24′57″N 0°19′13″E		1349053	The Ship Inn More images	Q26632376
The Oast House	II	Westwood Farm, Highcross Road, DA13 9PH			30 April 1981	TQ5975670540; 51°24′41″N 0°17′45″E		1085827	Upload Photo	Q26374459
Betsham House	II	Westwood Road			17 March 1982	TQ6051771522; 51°25′12″N 0°18′26″E		1085806	Upload Photo	Q26374368
Range of Five Oasthouses and Two Outbuildings at Mates Farm	II	Westwood Road			17 March 1982	TQ6045371303; 51°25′05″N 0°18′22″E		1349064	Upload Photo	Q26632386
Rose Cottage	II	Westwood Road, DA13 9LU			17 March 1982	TQ6045471233; 51°25′03″N 0°18′22″E		1085807	Upload Photo	Q26374374

== See also ==
- Grade I listed buildings in Kent
- Grade II* listed buildings in Kent

== Sources ==
- Newman, John (2012) [1969], Kent: West and the Weald, The Buildings of England, New Haven and London: Yale University Press, ISBN 978-0-300-18509-6
