= Southfleet =

Village in Kent, England

Coordinates: 51.4160°N 0.3207°E

- Location within Kent
- Population: 918 2011 Census
- OS grid reference: TQ615715
- Civil parish: Southfleet
- District: Dartford
- Shire county: Kent
- Region: South East
- Country: England
- Sovereign state: United Kingdom
- Post town: Gravesend
- Postcode district: DA13
- Dialling code: 01474
- Police: Kent
- Fire: Kent
- Ambulance: South East Coast
- UK Parliament: Dartford

Southfleet is a small village and civil parish in the borough of Dartford in Kent, England. The village is located three miles southwest of Gravesend, while the parish includes within its boundaries the hamlets of Betsham and Westwood.

Southfleet takes its name from the River Fleet, a minor tributary of the River Thames. The water that supplied the river came from a place called Springhead, where there were watercress and oyster beds; the river then flowed through Southfleet, Ebbsfleet and Northfleet. Southfleet has one shop, Broaditch Farm Shop, near the duck pond, and a pub, the Ship Inn, in the centre of the village. In 2026, the village was proposed as the location for a data center.

== Notable buildings ==
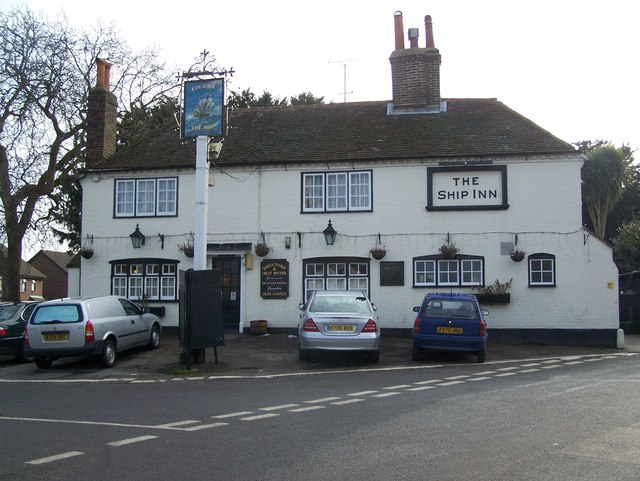
The Ship Inn

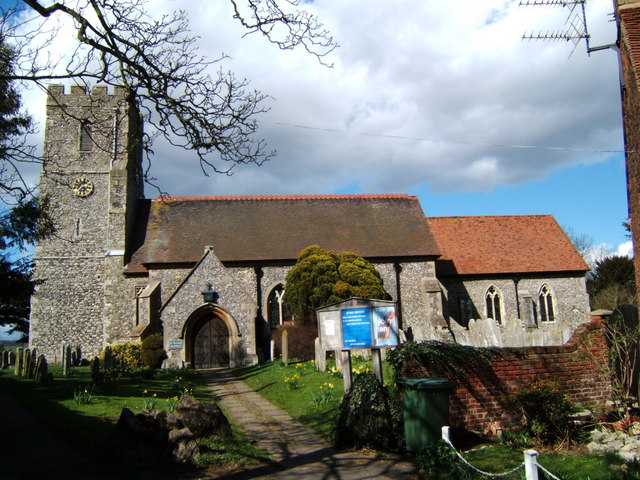
Church of St Nicholas

The village is grouped around a crossroads and many of its buildings, including the Ship Inn, are extremely old. The parish church of St Nicholas has 14th-century origins, although pre-Roman Christian remains have been found in the area. The church has memorials of the Sedley, Swan, and Peyton families.

In July 2026, a £3bn 90 acre data center, employing 420 when operational, was proposed by infrastructure developer Clearstone, to be located in New Barn Road between Southfleet and Northfleet.

== Governance ==
Southfleet fell within the Hundred of Axstane. The Local Government Act 1972 made the parish part of the borough of Dartford of Kent in 1974. The settlement of New Barn in the south of the parish was transferred to Longfield and New Barn parish in 1987.

== Transport ==
Southfleet had a railway station on the Gravesend West Line, which operated from 1886 to 1953. The section of the trackbed south of the A2 road of that closed line was used by Eurostar services to London Waterloo.

Currently, the closest railway station to Southfleet is Longfield on the Chatham Main Line, located approximately 2.3 miles from the village. The station provides rail services to London, The Medway Towns, Dover and Ramsgate.

The village is currently served by the 1st Bus Stop route 489. This service provides connections to Gravesend, Longfield and New Ash Green.

== See also ==
- Listed buildings in Southfleet
