= Isaac Nathan =

Jewish diaspora composer (1792–1864)

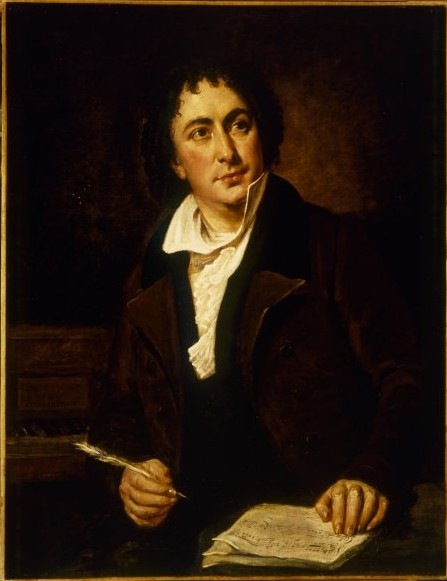
- Isaac Nathan c. 1820; artist unknown, probably one of Lord Byron's portraitists
- Born: 1792; Canterbury, Great Britain
- Died: January 15, 1864 (aged 71–72); Sydney, New South Wales
- Occupations: Composer, musicologist, journalist
- Relatives: Barnett Nathan (brother)

Isaac Nathan (1792 – 15 January 1864) was an Anglo-Jewish emigre Australian musician, composer, musicologist, and music educator, who has been called the "father of Australian music", having assisted the careers of numerous colonial musicians during his twenty-year residence in Australia. He is best known for the success of his Hebrew Melodies (1815–1840) in London. He became a composer of popular operatic comedies in the Royal Theatres (1823–1833), introduced below. After emigrating to Australia in 1840, Nathan wrote Australia's first operas Merry Freaks in Troublous Times (1843) and Don John of Austria (1847) Nathan also wrote the Australian Melodies, which entangled fragments of Aboriginal songlines with European musical traditions.

== Early Life ==
Isaac Nathan was most likely born in 1792 in the English city of Canterbury to a chazzan (Jewish cantor) born in Poland, Menahem Monash "Polack" (the Pole), and his English Jewish wife, Mary (Lewis) Goldsmid (1779–1842). His date of birth was erroneously recorded as 1790 on his tombstone in Camperdown Cemetery, which is at St Stephen's Church. This has misled scholars, perhaps most notably his own descendant Catherine Mackerras, who recorded his year of birth as 1790. However, Graham Pont discovered that Isaac Nathan wrote at least three autobiographical entries in newspapers and dictionaries identifying that he was born in 1792. Some records in the UK indicate that he was 44 years old in October 1835, suggesting that he might have been born in late 1791. Nathan was born at Canterbury Synagogue before their records began being kept officially in 1800. Nathan was one of six children (Edward, Isaac, Frank, Nathan, Barnett, Rachel) and their parents Menachem Monash (c. 1770–1823) and Mary Goldsmid (1779–1842) adopted the surname of Nathan. The young family lived in the Canterbury Synagogue 'surrounded by sober, godfearing co-religionists'. Phillips suggests it was considered fashionable to be plus royalist queue le Roi

Nathan was initially destined for his father's career and went to the Jewish night school of Solomon Lyon in Cambridge in 1805–1806 and then followed his master to continue his lessons at the Naval Academy, Chelsea 1807–1808. As a child, Nathan played violin, piano and organ and after showing an enthusiasm for music, he was apprenticed to the London Italian master singing teacher Domenico Corri. He composed some dances in 1806 and 1808, and his first individual songs were published around 1812–1814.

== Nathan as apprentice to Corri; and vocal teacher ==
In London, Domenico Corri (1746–1825) transmitted the teachings of Niccolò Porpora (1686–1768) “to a younger generation of musicians, most notably Isaac Nathan.” Nathan made significant contributions as a singing teacher and music historian notably publishing his Essay on the History and Theory of Music (1823) and later the Musurgia Vocalis (1836), and Southern Euphrosyne (1848). As a teacher, Nathan tailored arrangements and compositions to the individual singing needs of his students and community choirs while using the Neapolitan bel canto pedagogical tradition that he inherited in London. Nathan's students in England, included Princess Sophia Augusta and Princess Royal, Princess Charlotte, who was his Patron for the Hebrew Melodies, as well as Robert Browning In Australia his students included Dame Marie Carandini, Elizabeth Bushelle, William J. (Ian Pemberton) Palmer Miss E. M. Woolley, Ms Emily Strong and Mme Lucia Dondi née Mary Anne Lucy Chambers, The Australian Nightingale

== Hebrew Melodies ==
In 1813 Nathan conceived the idea of uniting beautiful Biblical poetry with divine ancient liturgical melodies and received encouragement from Princess Charlotte. One of the first subscribers was John Braham, the tenor, who joined with Nathan and lent his name to the project. The pair then invited Lord Byron to craft the words in a collaboration that resulted in significant popularity. Harold B. Segal writes "…as a whole [the Hebrew Melodies] could be considered at the forefront of discourse in England in which Jewish and Hebraic motifs went far beyond the conventional Hebrew Melodies and into the metaphysical propensities of romanticism. The result was the poet's famous Hebrew Melodies. Ruth Ha Cohen observed it was a unique mode of composition declaring it "a two-way process in which Nathan both set pre-existing poems by Byron to music and furnished tunes to which Byron composed new poetry" and asserting "there was no antecedent for collaboration on such a scale" and that it was a "clear attempt to make [Jewish] music more agreeable and accessible to Christian ears" Nathan's setting of these melodies remained in print for most of the century and new editions were published throughout his life, the last of which were printed in 1861. The Hebrew Melodies used, for the most part, melodies from the synagogue service. Nathan's claim that they were original ancient melodies handed down from the ancient service of the Temple in Jerusalem, was criticised at the time by his competitors. The success of the Melodies gave Nathan some fame and notoriety. His copyright for Hebrew Melodies ought to have brought him income – at one point he sold it to his married sister, presumably to avoid it being lost in bankruptcy. He attempted a publishing business in partnership with his brother Barnett Nathan, who later became proprietor of Rosherville Gardens.

== Provincial life, authoring books and raising a family ==
Nathan married Eliza Worthington, daughter of Lord Mayor of Dublin William Worthington in 1812. Eliza converted to Judaism and took the name Sarah. The young couple had 6 children together and dreamed of emancipation for the Jews, and embodied interfaith love, and scholarly approach to enlightened post-Napoleon aspirations for society. Both published significantly. Eliza's first novel Elvington was published in three volumes in 1812 and she is the first Jewish female author to write and publish a work of such significance. During their time in Bristol, she produced a second edition in 1819, and advertised Nathan's singing prospectus. Over the next few years the young couple raised their children in Bristol, wrote books, attended intellectual soirées with the Hunt Circle and Lyric Society and Nathan performed and taught several of his star pupils in this era. Eliza wrote another book called Langwreath which she published in 1822. Nathan published his encyclopaedic Treatise with patronage and dedication to King George IV and corresponded directly with Charles M. Sumner, the King's Librarian at Carlton House. The collection was catalogued in the same year, and Nathan appears to have gained privileged access, remarkable for a Jew in 1823. Nathan's publication of An Essay on the History and Theory of Music led to appointments as a composer in the King's Theatre and he contributed to five operas between 1823 and 1833.

== London return ==
In 1823, Nathan's father died, and he returned to London possibly with the aid of an inheritance. Nathan published a history of music (1823), dedicated by permission to King George IV, which shows in its treatment of Jewish music a great deal of understanding of the Bible and of Jewish traditions. The Essay on the History and Theory of Music contains within it 90 pages of exercises in the Neapolitan bel canto tradition which Nathan documented. This work was possibly formed part of an application for the role of professor of singing at the newly formed Royal Academy of Music. Nathan's treatise was later copied extensively by others including Domenic Crivelli (who was appointed professor of singing in 1824, and given access to Nathan's treatise), and Manuel García II, who was sent a copy of Nathan's Memoires of Madame Malibran de Beriot, for his sister in 1836, which contained citations directing Garcia to his Treatise. Nathan was not successful in his aspiration to be the professor of singing at the Royal Academy. Nathan wrote no fewer than five operas between 1823 and 1833, and many of his songs became very popular, notably "Why are you wandering here, I pray?" sung by Madame Vestris (who also played and fascinated in the lead character, Don Felix, in breeches in the comic opera The Alcaid).

== Comic Opera at the Royal Theatres ==
- Sweethearts and Wives (1823–1827) ran for five seasons and more than 120+ performances at the King's Theatre at Haymarket, the first long run to exclipse 100 performances since John Gay's Beggar's Opera (1728), with over 500 playbills across the country.
- The Alcaid; or, Secrets of Office (1824) ran for nine performances, was a technical advancement as a full opera with modulations, dances, and political satire engaged with the Liberal Trenio revolution in Spain (1820–1823) and a Passport office incident playing upon the Aliens Act (1824).
- The Illustrious Stranger (1827–1832) ran for five seasons initially, was popular in provinces and returned for a reprisal run in 1837, and more than 150+ performances at Drury Lane, eclipsing Sweethearts and Wives as the most popular show of the 1820s with over 1000 playbills across the country.
- The King's Fool; or, The Old Man's Curse (1833) ran for 37 performances at the Royal Victoria Theatre (Old Vic, formerly Royal Coburg).

Nathan was a well-established singing teacher in the 1830s and by 1836 his Musurgia vocalis, the second edition of his Essay on the History and Theory of Music established him as an authority on the bel canto tradition. One of his pupils was the English poet, the very young Robert Browning, who 60 years later recalled: "As for singing, the best master of four I have, more or less, practised with was Nathan, author of the Hebrew Melodies; he retained certain traditional Jewish methods of developing the voice".

== Official secret service for the Royal Family ==
From 1837 to 1839, Nathan was engaged by King William IV to protect the British royal family. He discovered a plot and proposed working as a secret agent to purchased 500 copies of a book called The Secret History before it could reach public readership. The book was written by Sophia Woodward and together with a birth certificate identified Lady Edwardina Flinn (née Kent) as the second daughter of King George IV and Queen Caroline during wedlock. Reverend William Groves baptised the Royal baby and later certified she was the legitimate heir to the throne by birthright. When Nathan sought to claim expenses for his actions, the Prime Minister Lord Melbourne intervened and his allowed a personal vendetta to affect his official role. Melbourne refused to honor the Seal of King William IV Nathan was left in financial ruin. He sold everything he had and gathered his family and moved to Australia.

== "Father of Australian Music" ==
Nathan emigrated to Australia with his children, arriving in Sydney by April 1841. There he became a leader of local musical life, acting as music adviser both to the synagogue and to the Roman Catholic cathedral, composing new music in search of an 'Australian' musical identity. He gave first or early performances in Australia of many of the works of Mozart, Beethoven, Paer, Gluck, Rossini and others in his Australian Philharmonic Series in 1844. He was the first to research and transcribe Australian Aboriginal music; he also set lyrics by the poet Eliza Hamilton Dunlop.

Nathan wrote Australia's first operas, Merry Freaks in Troublous Times (1843) and Don John of Austria (1847), and Australia's first song cycle, The Australian Melodies. He made significant contributions as a singing teacher, and as one of the country's earliest music journalists. Nathan published prolifically with announcements, advertisements, analysis, context, lyrics and reviews. On 3 May 1847, Don John of Austria became his first opera to be produced in Australia, at the Royal Victoria Theatre, Sydney.

Nathan's legacy reaches the twentieth century via composers like Peter Sculthorpe, who wrote an orchestral piece in 1988 called At the Grave of Isaac Nathan.

In 1993, Peter Sculthorpe wrote:

I went to Macquarie street, to see the remains of Horbury Terrace, where Nathan had lived, and to examine the collection of Nathan's music and writings in the Mitchell Library. Ever since making that first contact, Nathan's spirit, beliefs, ideas and hopes for Australia have both inspired and sustained me. His influence has been more than musical: it has also been moral and ideological. Nathan was one of the first prominent colonists to express a strong sympathy for the Aborigines and to write intelligently of their music, beliefs and customs. In this and in many other respects, the author and editor of The Southern Euphrosyne was himself a rara avis... Nathan was unquestionably our first important composer and musicologist. After twenty–three years of pioneering work, he laid the foundations of creative music, professional concert life and serious opera in Australia. The Spirit of Isaac Nathan is still with us, a formative part of the Australian ethos. In honouring his spirit, and achievements, on the two hundredth anniversary of his birth, we are expressing our faith in the development of a gentle, enlightened, charitable, and imaginative society for which Nathan worked so hard.

The portrait of Nathan shown in this article is held by the National Library of Australia.

== Death and descendants ==
On 15 January 1864 Nathan was crushed by a tram car in Sydney at the intersection of Pitt Street, where he lived at No. 442, and Goulburn Street after alighting from the tram. The horse-drawn tram was the first in Sydney: Nathan was Australia's (indeed the southern hemisphere's) first tram fatality. He was buried in Sydney; his tomb is at Camperdown Cemetery.

Many of Nathan's descendants became leading Australian citizens. Later descendants include four brothers – the conductor Charles Mackerras; the psephologist Malcolm Mackerras; the headmaster of Sydney Grammar School Alastair Mackerras; the sinologist Colin Mackerras, and their nephew, the conductor Alexander Briger.

== Summary ==
Nathan's Hebrew Melodies were in print in England at least until the 1850s. They were particularly prominent among Jewish circles, probably because they resonate with Jewish enlightenment (Haskalah) sentiments. Nathan continued recomposing these songs and others with the last formal publications occurring in Sydney in 1861.

Detailed diary accounts show that Nathan and Byron had a close and enduring professional and personal collaboration over a sustained period of time. For some songs, Nathan played music at the piano, and Byron was struck with a flash of inspiration to write the prose. Most likely, Nathan gave Byron the theological context derived from Talmudic oral traditions, then sang melodies for Byron. Much of the work was done while the pair were together, although some poems were sent by letter. The songs diffused a spirit of philosemitism in cultured circles (indeed they became perhaps Byron's most genuinely popular work); but they were used as the basis for settings by many other composers in the nineteenth century, both Jewish (Felix and Fanny Mendelssohn, Joachim, Max Bruch, and Frances Lyon Cohen (who wrote his own arrangements between 1894–1904 after warming to Nathan's approach) and gentile (Schumann, Loewe, Bruch, Mussorgsky, Balakirev, and others). The Hebrew Melodies were at the forefront of a fashionable movement in the early nineteenth century in which Haskalah ideas of the Jewish Enlightenment were considered exotic. The Haskalah promoted aspirational values of religious emancipation, education, and equality.

Nathan's wrote four significant theoretical works. His "Essay on the History and Theory of Music" (1823) documented the Neapolitan bel canto tradition of Nicola Porpora, and he proposed it as a curriculum for the newly established Royal Academy of Music (London). This curriculum was later copied extensively by Manual García (1805–1906), whose subsequent books on singing are still relied upon as an authority on historical approaches to singing teaching. In his first treatise, Nathan argued for a publicly funded school of music and addressed it to King George IV. The king granted a royal charter a few years later in 1830. In 1836, Nathan published his most famous treatise, Musurgia vocalis. This work drew on ancient theorists and tried to explain the legendary power of music to create an emotional response in listeners. Again, Nathan advocated for public music education, and four years later the British government granted a sum of £30,000 for a new public school of music.

In Australia, Nathan wrote a series of lectures on the history and theory of music, and delivered these at Sydney College in 1844, and published them in 1846 appealing to Charles Augustus FitzRoy, the governor of New South Wales to fund music education. Nathan was the singing teacher at the time for Lady Fitzroy (the Governor's wife). In 1849, Nathan published The Southern Euphrosyne featuring fragments of Aboriginal songs, excerpts of Australian melodies, national anthems, and Australia's first opera. He sent it to Queen Victoria to give to Prince Albert as a gift, and petitioned her to consider his loyalty, and bring him back to London to drink tea with her. In 1850, Governor Fitzroy announced "An Act to Incorporate and Endow the University of Sydney", and in 1858, Queen Victoria granted a Royal Charter to fund the institution.

Some scholars suggested that Nathan should be remembered as "the father of Australian music".
