= Australian World Orchestra =

Australian symphony orchestra

- Symphony orchestra
- Short name: AWO
- Founded: 2011
- Location: Australia
- Website: australianworldorchestra.com.au

The Australian World Orchestra (AWO) is a symphony orchestra based in Australia. It consists of Australian musicians playing in orchestras all over the world, many as concertmasters and principals, from Australian state orchestras, and from musicians of the Australian Youth Orchestra. There is no fixed hierarchical seating within orchestra sections. Members of the AWO also form various chamber music ensembles, e.g. the Chamber 8, Chamber Six, a Piano Quintet.

== History ==
The Australian World Orchestra was established in 2011 by Australian conductor Alexander Briger and his sister, film maker Gabrielle Thompson. The inaugural patron of the orchestra was Sir Charles Mackerras, Briger and Thompson's uncle.

The first season in 2011 was conducted by Briger (Brahms's Academic Festival Overture and Beethoven's Symphony No. 9 with Cheryl Barker, Elizabeth Campbell, Steve Davislim, Teddy Tahu Rhodes) and Simone Young (Prelude and Venusberg Music from Wagner's Tannhäuser, Sculthorpe's Earth Cry with William Barton, Tchaikovsky's Symphony No. 6 Pathétique).

Zubin Mehta conducted the orchestra in 2013 with The Rite of Spring, and returned to conduct again in 2015 when the AWO performed in three cities in India, with soprano Greta Bradman as guest soloist. Mehta returned again in 2022 to conduct the AWO in a performance of Strauss' works in Sydney and Melbourne. That year, Mehta also conducted the orchestra at the BBC Proms and at the Edinburgh International Festival.

In 2015 the AWO brought Sir Simon Rattle to Australia to conduct the orchestra in concerts in Sydney and Melbourne with guest mezzo-soprano, his wife Magdalena Kožená. Rattle has described the AWO as an "international treasure".

At the AWO's 5th anniversary in 2016, Briger premiered the commission by Australian composer Elena Kats-Chernin The Witching Hour, A Concerto for Eight Double Basses, at the Sydney Opera House and the Esplanade in Singapore.

In 2017 Simone Young conducted the AWO with the Australian National Academy of Music (ANAM) in performance of Messiaen's Turangalîla-Symphonie at the Arts Centre Melbourne and the AWO Chamber 8 completed their first Australian tour performing at Queensland Performing Arts Centre (QPAC), City Recital Hall Sydney, Melbourne Recital Centre and Perth Concert Hall.

In 2018 Riccardo Muti conducted the AWO for performances at the Sydney Opera House and Arts Centre Melbourne, and invited the orchestra to tour his home country of Italy.

Later in 2018 the AWO toured India, performing in Chennai as the opening act of the Australian Government's 6 month festival of Australian Culture "OzFest" and additional concerts in Kochi and Mumbai conducted by Briger and with guest soloists, French mezzo-soprano Caroline Meng (Briger's wife) and the Australian-born and educated Daniel Dodds, artistic director of the Lucerne Festival Strings.

In 2019 Alexander Briger conducted the AWO with Nigel Westlake's Flying Dream, Janáček's Taras Bulba and Sibelius' Symphony No. 2 for performances at the Arts Centre Melbourne and for the orchestra's first performance in Canberra at Llewellyn Hall. The AWO Chamber Six performed at City Recital Hall, Sydney.

The AWO commissioned Australian composer and clarinetist Paul Dean to compose his Symphony No. 1 "Black Summer" to celebrate its 10th anniversary in 2021. Briger premiered the piece in concerts at the Llewellyn Hall in Canberra, and City Recital Hall, Sydney. The performances garnered positive reviews, and the Australian Arts Review expressed that "Briger has created an orchestral Rolls Royce ..."

The AWO travelled to the United Kingdom in August 2022, as part of Edinburgh's 75th anniversary celebrations, and the UK|AU cultural exchange, performing at the Edinburgh International Festival and the BBC Proms, conducted by Zubin Mehta, accompanied by Australian soprano Siobhan Stagg. Mehta conducted the AWO in 2022 in Sydney and Melbourne in performances of Richard Strauss's tone poems.

Briger returned in 2023 to conduct Mahler's Symphony No. 9 at the Arts Centre Melbourne and the Sydney Opera House; followed in 2025 with Mahler 4 and [[Symphony No. 5 (Mahler)}5]].

For the orchestra's 15th anniversary in 2026, the orchestra commissioned the song cycle Songs for a Stranger from Jonathan Mills, drawn from his opera Eucalyptus. They also played Stravinsky's Petrushka and Shostakovich's Symphony No. 10.

== Discography ==
List of albums, with selected details
Title	Details
Beethoven: Symphony No. 9 (with Alexander Briger)	Released: September 2013; Format: CD, Digital; Label: ABC Music
Mahler: Symphony No. 1 (with Zubin Mehta)	Released: May 2014; Format: CD, Digital; Label: ABC
Stravinsky: The Rite of Spring (with Zubin Mehta)	Released: May 2014; Format: CD, Digital; Label: ABC
Bruckner: Symphony No. 8 (with Simon Rattle)	Released: 2016; Format: CD, Digital; Label: ABC

== Awards and nominations ==
Award nominations and wins
Year	Nominee / work	Award	Result
2014	Stravinsky Rite of Spring / Mahler Symphony No. 1 (with Zubin Mehta)	ARIA Music Awards Best Classical Album	Nominated
2016	Australian World Orchestra (Conductor Sir Simon Rattle)	Helpmann Award Best Symphony Orchestra Concert	Won
2022	Australian World Orchestra (Conductor Zubin Mehta)	Limelight Awards People's Choice "Artist of the Year"	Won
