= The Puppet-Show =

British humorous and satirical weekly magazine

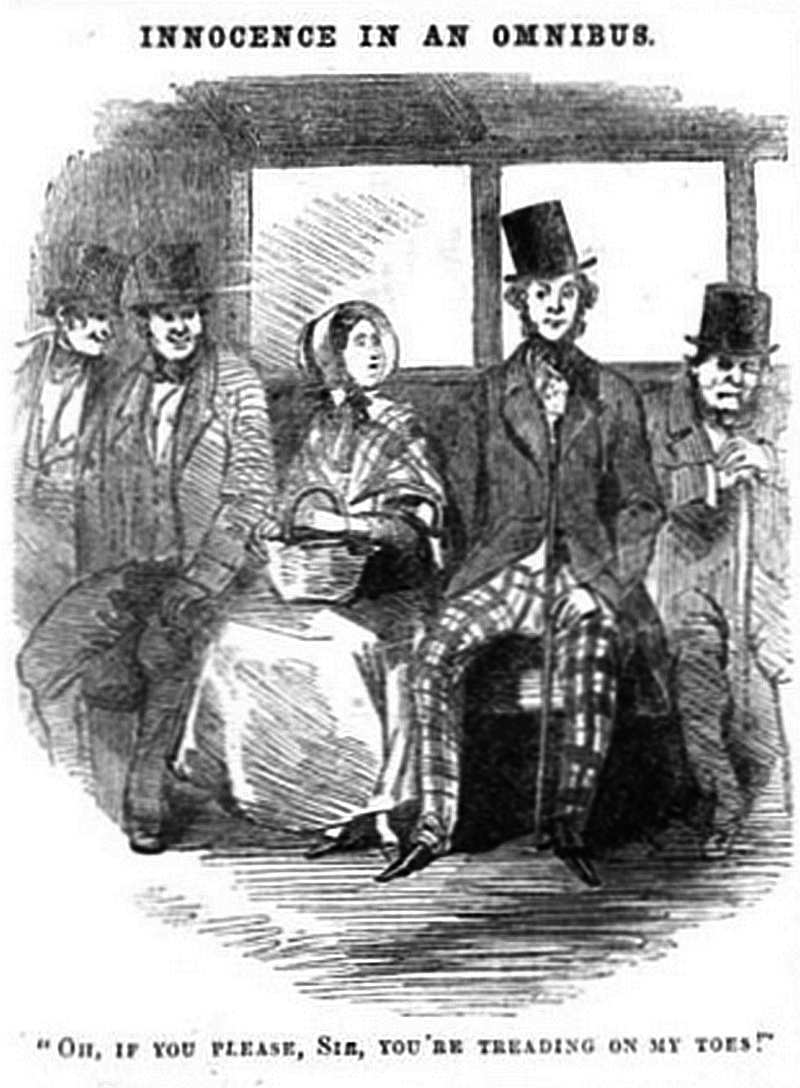
A cartoon from volume 1, issue 2 (26 March 1848)

The Puppet-Show (1848–1849) was a British humorous and satirical weekly magazine, a short-lived imitator of Punch, edited by John Bridgeman from offices at 11 Wellington Street North in London. The first issue was published on 18 March 1848. The primary targets of its political satire were Lord Russell's Whig ministry, Chartists, Irish nationalists, and the French.
