= Gravesend West railway station =

Railway station in Gravesend, England

Coordinates: 51.4444°N 0.3639°E

Gravesend West
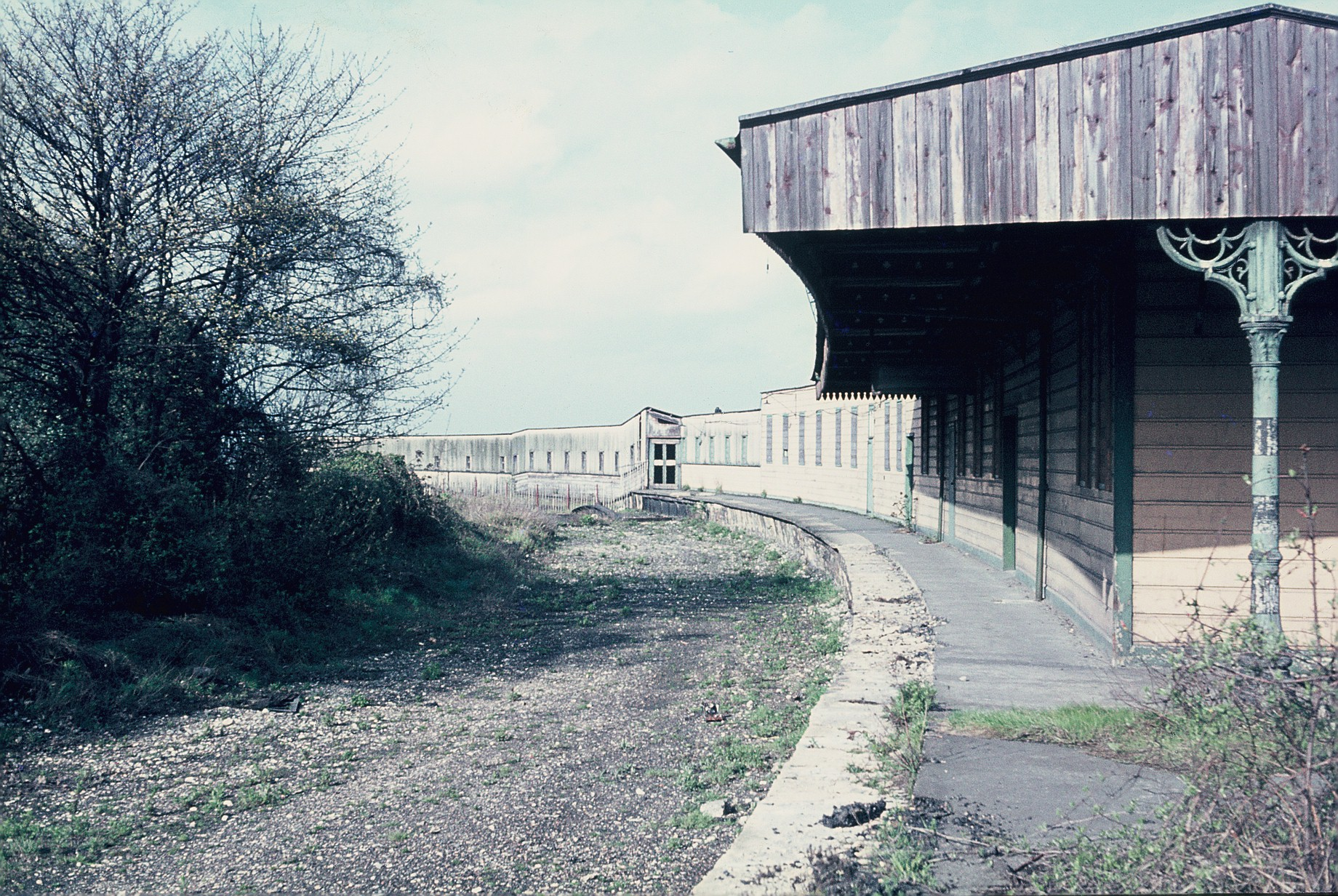
- The station remains in 1969

General information
- Location: Gravesend, Borough of Gravesham; England
- Grid reference: TQ643743
- Platforms: 2

Other information
- Status: Disused

History
- Pre-grouping: London, Chatham and Dover Railway
- Post-grouping: Southern Railway; Southern Region of British Railways

Key dates
- 10 May 1886: Opened as "Gravesend"
- 1899: Renamed "Gravesend West Street"
- 26 September 1949: Renamed "Gravesend West"
- 3 August 1953: Closed to passengers
- 25 March 1968: Closed completely
Location

Gravesend West was a railway station on the Gravesend West Line which served Gravesend in Kent. It opened in 1886 and was, for some time, a regular destination for boat trains from London which linked with steamers on the station's pier to ferry passengers to a variety of coastal towns and resorts. The station closed in 1953 to passengers and later to freight in 1968. The only reminder of Gravesend West which remains today is its pier, the rest having been taken over by redevelopment in the area.

== Early years ==
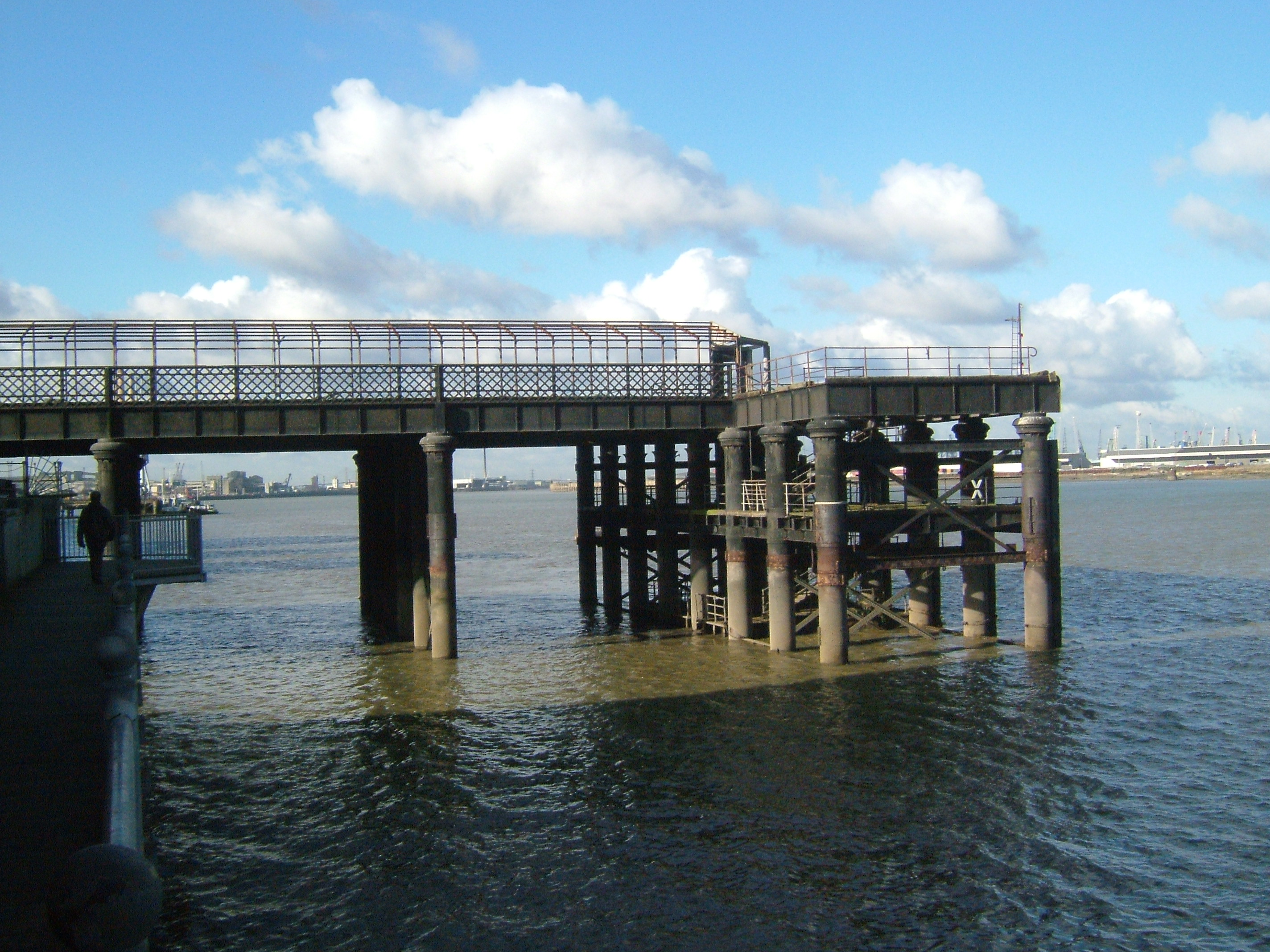
The remains of the West Street Pier

Opened in 1886 by the London, Chatham and Dover Railway (LCDR), the station provided the third rail route to Gravesend after the South Eastern Railway's North Kent Line which had reached the town in 1849 and the London, Tilbury and Southend Railway's ferry service from its Tilbury station on the opposite bank of the Thames which had begun in 1854. The official opening of the station to public traffic on Monday 10 May 1886 was marked by the protest of local landowner Lord Darnley who barricaded Stuart Road in protest against the LCDR's right to use his roads in Gravesend. The barriers were removed half-an-hour before the official opening, and the dispute was later resolved by arbitration.

The station had two facing platforms which formed a 'V' shape, with the two left-hand tracks alongside the down platform (No. 1) extending towards the pier. The main station buildings were located at the base of the 'V' and were solidly built in a slightly Gothic style. It was constructed of yellow London stocks under a roof of Welsh slate, with red brick rubbers used for the quoins, arches and bench courses. The buildings extended over the No. 2 up platform which was sheltered by a glazed roof light. An adequately sized goods yard could be found on the down side, with the goods shed situated on the up side. A steel bridge led out from the station over West Street towards the spartan pier on the muddy banks of the Thames.

Passenger services consisted of boat trains from London which connected with steamer services across the Thames and beyond. It was from the West Street Pier that the ill-fated Princess Alice sailed on 3 September 1878. In 1899, the South Eastern Railway merged with the LCDR and the station was renamed "Gravesend West Street" to distinguish it from the SER's own station in the town centre. In this same year, the "Belle Steamers" service was operating a sailing from the West Street Pier to Southend, Clacton-on-Sea and Walton-on-the-Naze. Another steamer service operated to Harwich, Felixstowe and Great Yarmouth.

In 1916, at the height of the First World War, the Dutch Batavia Line introduced a steamer service from the West Street Pier to Rotterdam. A "Continental Express" boat train service from Victoria was laid on to connect with the steamers, and signs in Dutch began to appear at some intermediate stations; in Dutch, Gravesend West Street was "Heeren". The Prince Consort of Holland was said to have occasionally used the service.

== Post-war decline ==
The Second World War saw the end of the Batavia Line service which operated from Tilbury once hostilities were over. Passenger services, which had already been reduced by the Southern Railway in the 1920s, were maintained at their war-time levels of five trains each way, with ten on Saturdays. Freight traffic on the line was declining, and more passenger traffic was using Gravesend Central with its frequent electric train service. There were still, however, a certain number of steamer services, with the General Steam Navigation Company running pleasure trips using their ships "Royal Daffodil", "Royal Sovereign" and "Queen of the Channel".

Passenger services were eventually withdrawn from Monday 3 August 1953, with goods traffic continuing a further 15 years.

Preceding station	Disused railways	Following station
Rosherville Halt	British Railways; Southern Region; Gravesend West Line	Terminus

== The station today ==
The greater part of the station was demolished in 1991, with the remaining section of viaduct and bridge over West Street going in September 2006, having been reprieved in 2001. The North Downs Railway Society managed, however, to recover the platform canopy supports from Gravesend West station, which have been installed at Groombridge on the Spa Valley Railway. This leaves the Pier as the only remaining structure.
