= Gravesend West Line =

Railway line in the UK

The Gravesend Line in relation to other railway lines in Kent

The Gravesend West Line was a short railway line in Kent that branched off the Swanley to Chatham line at Fawkham Junction and continued for a distance of 5 miles (8 km) to Gravesend where the railway company constructed a pier to connect trains with steamers. It was opened in 1886 and closed to passenger services in 1953, remaining open to freight until 1968 before reopening briefly between 1972 and 1976. Part of the railway's former alignment was incorporated into the Channel Tunnel Rail Link.

== History ==
Authorisation to construct the Gravesend West Line was obtained by the Gravesend Railway Company in the shape of the Gravesend Railway Act 1881 (44 & 45 Vict. c. cxliv) which received royal assent on 18 July 1881. The act envisaged a junction with the Chatham Main Line near the village of Pinden which lies between the larger settlements of Farningham and Fawkham from which a line would run to Gravesend, a town already well-served by the railway. The project was driven by Sir Sydney Hedley Waterlow, Bart., the Liberal Member of Parliament for Gravesend and Deputy Chairman of the London, Chatham and Dover Railway (LCDR) which had built the Chatham Main Line. The LCDR's great rival, the South Eastern Railway (SER), attempted to block the scheme by seeking parliamentary authorisation for a loop line towards Northfleet and Snodland which would take in land required by the Gravesend Railway. The latter successfully petitioned against the SER's bill and obtained approval for its own scheme.

The 1881 act sanctioned the construction of a double-track line from the LCDR's Main Line to a terminus which was said to be "Near the Ragged School" at Gravesend and initial plans had it sited in Princes Street. The initial capital of the railway company was £200,000 and it had powers to borrow a further £55,000. The line had to be completed within five years after which it would be worked by the LCDR. The construction works were put out to tender and eventually the offer of £108,000 from a Mr G. Barclay-Price was accepted on 3 August 1881. There was some internal discussion over the eventual siting of the terminus which was changed to Bath Street and then finally to Stuart Road. Around the same time, the London, Tilbury and Southend Railway proposed to link with the Gravesend Line and the SER via a tunnel under the Thames from Tilbury, but this was never realised.

A second act of Parliament was obtained on 24 July 1882; the Gravesend Railway Act 1882 (45 & 46 Vict. c. cliii) authorised construction of a pier on the Thames and the extension of the line to serve it. The railway company's capital was increased by £50,000 and its borrowing rights by £16,600. The contractor, Barclay-Price, submitted a revised tender of £143,000 to complete the line and pier. By 29 June 1883 works were sufficiently advanced for the LCDR to take over formal control of the Gravesend Railway Company, holding a ceremony the following day at Stuart Road where the first sod was formally cut.

The line was officially opened on Saturday 17 April 1886, the date coinciding with the opening of the Tilbury Docks. The first train departed Fawkham Junction with Lady Waterlow being assisted to drive the train to Gravesend where the guests then went on to visit Tilbury Docks. Public services commenced the following Monday. There were stations at Longfield, Southfleet, Rosherville Gardens and Gravesend West Street (later called Gravesend West).

== Operations ==
=== Passenger services ===
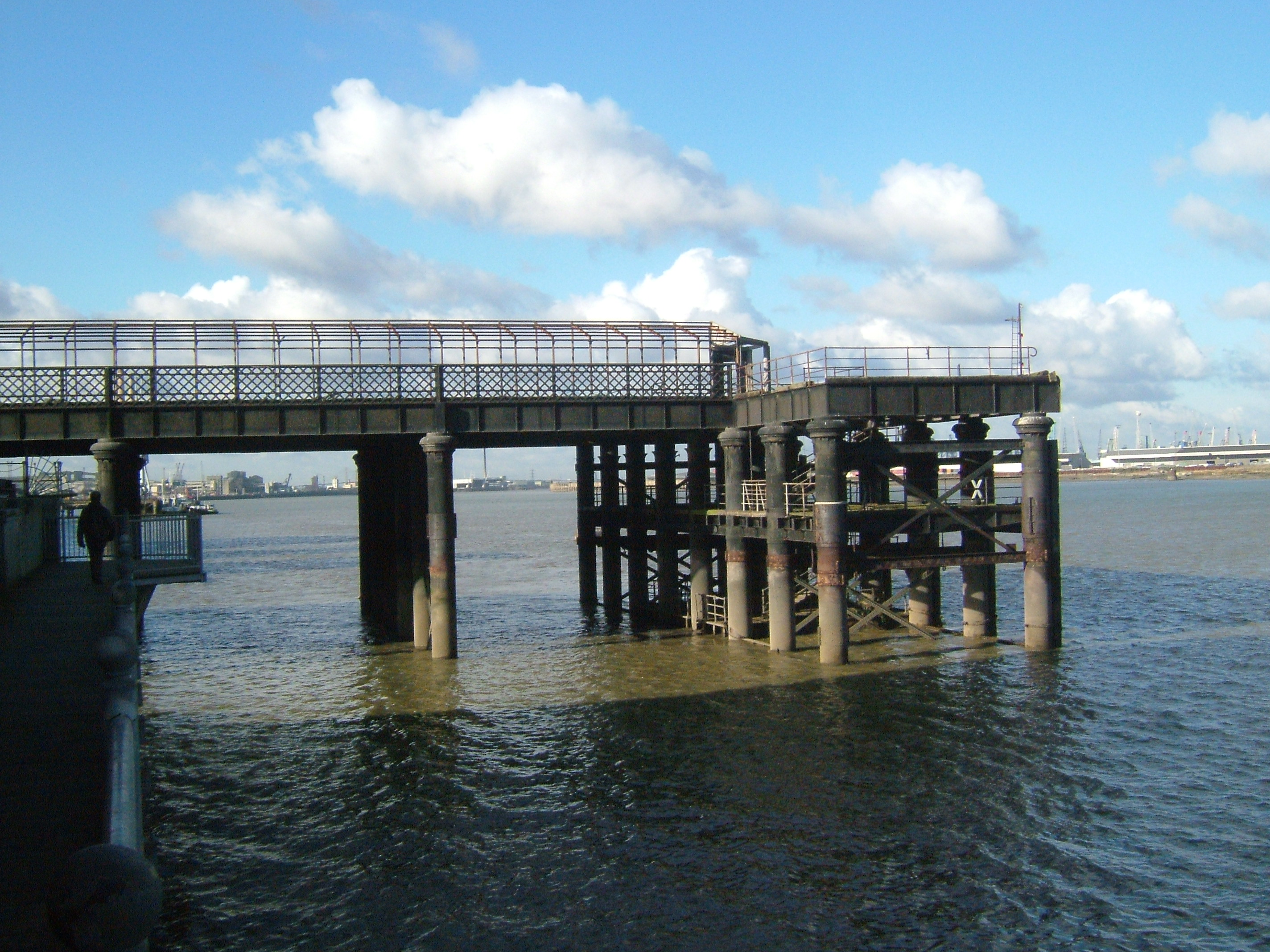
The remains of the West Street Pier

In 1886 the service consisted of 14 trains in each direction on weekdays (a cheap rate was available for four of them) and 8 on Sundays. All services ran through from London, the journey time being around 70 minutes, the same time which the SER took to complete the journey via its North Kent Line. The London, Tilbury and Southend Railway ran a rather shorter service in 52 minutes by using a river crossing. It was from the West Street Pier that the ill-fated Princess Alice sailed on 3 September 1878.

In 1916, at the height of the First World War, the Dutch Batavia Line introduced a steamer service from the West Street Pier to Rotterdam. A "Continental Express" boat train service from London Victoria was laid on to connect with the steamers, and signs in Dutch began to appear at some intermediate stations; in Dutch, Gravesend West Street was "Heeren" and Rosherville "Gents". The Prince Consort of Holland was said to have occasionally used the service.

Services on the line were later increased to 10 each way on weekdays, 12 on Saturdays and 6 on Sundays. This went up again following the 1923 grouping which saw the Southern Railway take over the line and laying on 12 services per day on weekdays. Five services ran from Swanley Junction, one from Bickley, one boat train at 17:45 from Victoria (with intermediate stops at Penge East, Beckenham Junction, Shortlands and Bromley South), four from Holborn Viaduct, one ordinary service from Victoria and one from Charing Cross via the Chislehurst loop.

The closure of Rosherville Pleasure Gardens in 1910 meant that there was not enough traffic to sustain Rosherville which closed in 1933. The Batavia Line service ceased in 1939 following the outbreak of the Second World War and when it resumed its services after the war, it transferred its activities to Tilbury where there were better facilities. The wartime service of five trains each way (three in the morning, two in the evening) continued after the war. The Saturday service remained, however, strong at ten services each way, enabling Farningham Road residents subject to petrol rationing to reach Gravesend. During the late 1940s till 1966, General Steam Navigation ran pleasure trips from the West Street Pier, using a pleasure steamer called the "Royal Daffodil". In more recent years, White Horse Ferries operated services from the pier using trimarans.

Passenger services were withdrawn from Monday 3 August 1953, the last train having run the previous Saturday. There were attempts during the 1960s to have services restored, notably by local authorities, but British Rail (BR) rejected these calls on the basis that it would mean electrifying the line and pointing out that it would be a longer and slower service to London than that provided by the North Kent Line. This argument did not take account of the fact that towns such as Bromley, Orpington and even Rochester have one route to Victoria and another to Charing Cross and Cannon Street.

=== Freight ===
Early freight consisted of fruit and other agricultural produce from Southfleet and from Chambers siding between Fawkham Junction and Southfleet. Coal and cement was also carried. A network of sidings developed around Gravesend West Street principally to serve the Red Lion Chalk and Whiting Company, the Imperial Cement Works Ltd, the Crown and London Cement Works and a paper mill. The post-1918 years saw a decline in the freight traffic and the closure of the industrial sidings. The Southern Railway concentrated goods traffic on the West Branch, thereby relieving Gravesend Central and the North Kent Line. The Southern's programme of electrification in the 1930s did not extend to the line, although an electricity cable did have to be laid under the line from the Central Electricity Board at Northfleet to railway substations at Denton and Fawkham. By the 1950s, freight traffic was down to one service a day, no doubt helping the line win a competition in 1950 for the best-maintained section of track.

In 1959, the line was singled and much of its now surplus equipment, including station buildings and signalboxes, were removed. By 1967, BR's plan to withdraw local wagon load freight facilities was well under way, and later that year the line lost its regular freight service. On 24 March 1968 the freight service entirely ceased and the line closed; the last service to run had been that of the Locomotive Club of Great Britain on 3 March as part of their "Invicta" railtour. The north end of the line was physically disconnected from the rest of the branch and by September only 1,100 yards or 1,000 metres remained beyond Southfleet. The extant section of the line briefly reopened between 1972 and 1976 to serve APCM's coal concentration depot at Southfleet.

== Attempted preservation ==
It was the chance discovery in 1980 that the track remained intact that led to an attempt to reopen the Gravesend West Branch as a heritage railway. Notices were placed in the local press which eventually led to the setting up of the North Downs Steam Railway Society to operate a section from Fawkham Junction to Southfleet as a steam-worked line. The scheme attracted support and membership of the society grew to over 500. Negotiations were opened with the British Railways Property Board for the grant of a lease and purchase of the track; it was not possible for the society to purchase the route of the line due to the presence of an electricity supply cable. The former goods yard at Higham was used as a depot from March 1981 where the pride of the society's collection, a Robert Stephenson and Hawthorns' 0-6-0T No. 7846 of 1955, was stabled. To keep up Chatham traditions, an LCDR 3rd class carriage, 4 wheel coach body, from 1870 was also acquired. A magazine, "The Downs Line", was published regularly and meetings were held at St. Mark's Church Centre in Rosherville.

In November 1982 BR asked for a down payment of £25,000 for the track, with £5,000 to be paid up front as an indication of the society's intention to lease the land. The society raised £2,500 from its members and its bank agreed to loan a further £5,000 if certain points in the lease were settled. A cheque for £2,500 was sent to BR who promptly returned it and terminated negotiations. Around the same time, the society received notice to quit Higham by 31 May 1983. It now sought to relocate to Southfleet.

Unknown to the society, a third party – Resco (Railways) Ltd – a professional restoration company, had been looking to set up a museum in the Kent area which would feature exhibits of rural transport around 1914. Attracted by the presence of a ready-established preservation society on the Gravesend Branch, Resco began negotiations with BR for the purchase of the track and an option for a lease on the land, subject to them obtaining a light railway order. Resco met with the society on 9 March 1983 when it invited the society to run the line on its behalf. The society, fearing a loss of identity if it proceeded, put the question to an extraordinary general meeting held on 15 April at which Resco's managing director emphasised that the society had not been 'gazumped'. In the event, the society voted 2 to 1 not to join the Resco scheme and relocated its activities to Chatham Dockyard. It later found a permanent home at Tunbridge Wells West where it amalgamated with the Tunbridge Wells and Eridge Preservation Society in 1996 and operates services as the Spa Valley Railway. Resco now began discussions with Southfleet Parish Council which had reservations about the effects of a heritage railway on the area, particularly concerning the likelihood of increased traffic on the country lanes around Southfleet. The project made no further progress.

== The line today ==
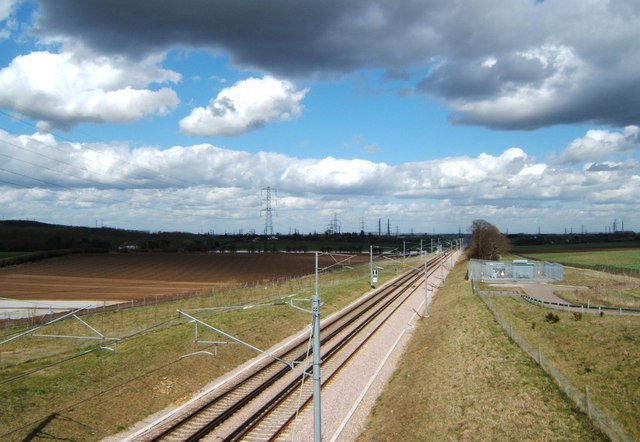
Route of the CTRL near Fawkham Junction

As part of section 1 of the Channel Tunnel Rail Link (CTRL) the remaining rails on the Gravesend West Branch around Southfleet were lifted during the autumn of 1998 and works began to excavate a new track bed. CTRL services would follow a route running alongside the M2 and A2 as far as Pepper Hill between Gravesend and Southfleet before curving south on a spur just before the B262 Station Road to join the alignment of the Gravesend Line along as far as Fawkham Junction where it joins the Chatham Main Line and proceeds to Waterloo.

The trackbed to the north of the CTRL spur remains traceable as far as Vale Road when it is taken over by the A2260 Thames Way. Gravesend Borough Council has announced in its local plan its attention to seek agreement with BR to convert the remaining section of the line within the town into recreational use.

The station buildings have, in the main part, been swept away in subsequent redevelopments of the area. Only the stationmaster's house at Southfleet and the Gravesend West Pier now remains. The majority of Gravesend West itself was demolished in 1991, with the remaining section of viaduct and bridge over West Street going in September 2006, having previously been reprieved in 2001. The North Downs Railway Society managed, however, to recover the platform canopy from Gravesend West station and this has been installed at Groombridge. In addition, some track materials were recovered from the line in 1988 by the Kent and East Sussex Railway. Regular passenger services ceased in 2007 over the Channel Tunnel Rail Link between Fawkham Junction and Pepper Hill (occupying the former Gravesend West Line) when phase 2 of the CTRL route to St. Pancras International was opened. The route is still maintained for occasional empty stock trains.
