= West Hill Hospital =

- Dartford and Gravesham NHS Trust
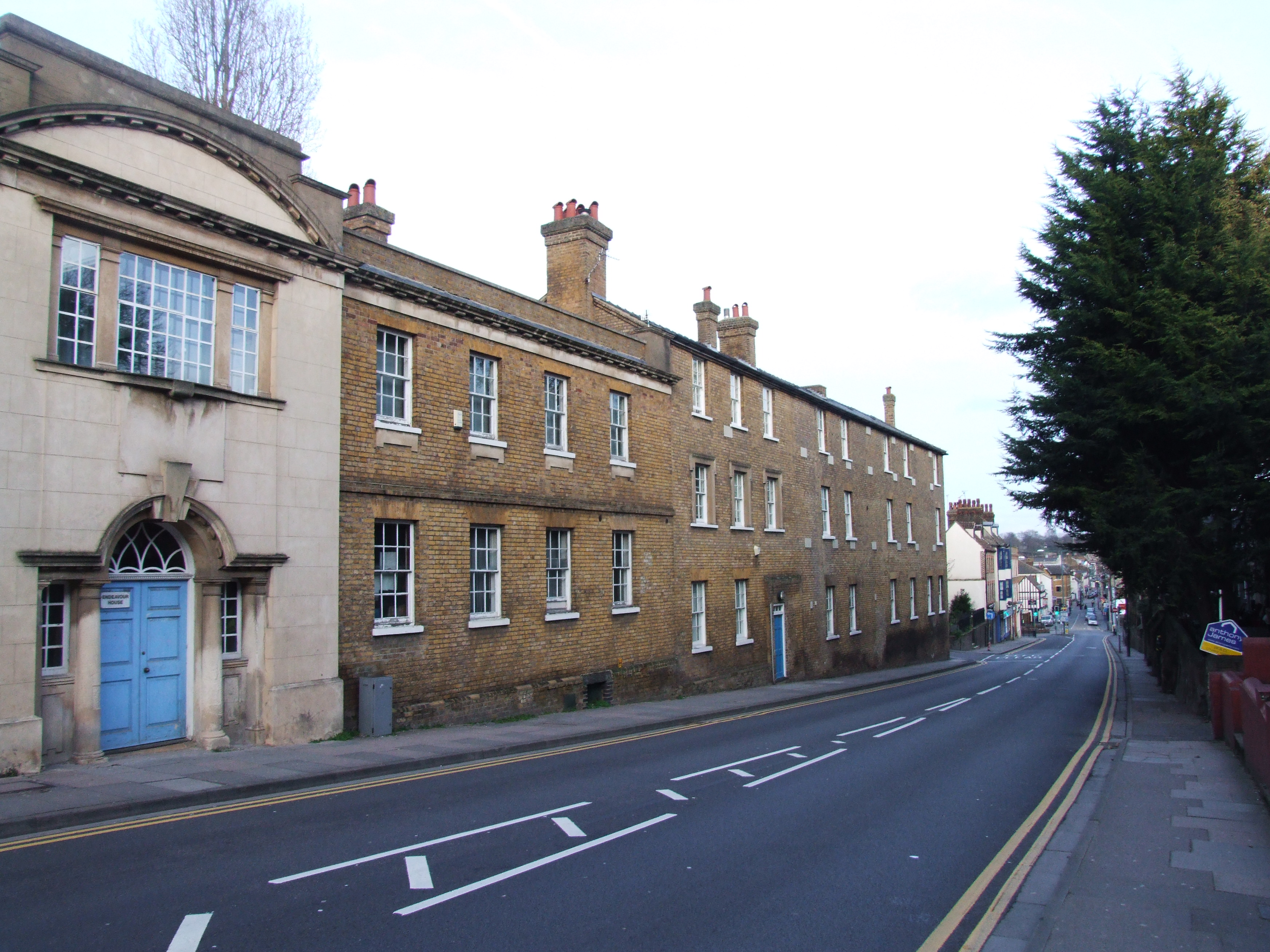
- The old West Hill Workhouse

- Shown in Kent

Geography
- Location: West Hill, Dartford, Kent, England
- Coordinates: 51.4459°N 0.2109°E

Organisation
- Care system: NHS
- Type: Community

History
- Founded: 1860
- Closed: 2000

West Hill Hospital was a health facility in West Hill, Dartford, Kent, England. It was managed by Dartford and Gravesham NHS Trust.

== History ==
The facility had its origins in the Dartford Union Workhouse which was designed by John Whichcord and opened in 1860. A chapel was added in 1878 and two infirmaries were added to the north of the workhouse in 1897. It became King Edward Hospital in 1913 and the buildings were used as accommodation for munitions workers at the local Vickers factory during the First World War. The facility was renamed the County Hospital in 1935 and suffered bomb damage when one nurse and 24 patients were killed in one of the female wards in enemy bombing in 1940 during the Second World War. It joined the National Health Service as West Hill Hospital in 1948. A new accident and emergency department, together with new operating theatres and a new out-patients unit were opened by Princess Anne in 1971.

After inpatient services transferred to Joyce Green Hospital in 1997 and then outpatient services transferred to Darent Valley Hospital in 2000, West Hill Hospital closed and the hospital buildings were subsequently demolished. Although the hospital site was acquired by Barratt Developments for residential development, the main workhouse frontage survived.
