= Gravesham Community Hospital =

- Dartford and Gravesham NHS Trust; Kent Community Health NHS Foundation Trust

Geography
- Location: Gravesend, Kent, England
- Coordinates: 51.4431°N 0.3654°E

Organisation
- Care system: National Health Service
- Type: Community

Services
- Emergency department: Urgent treatment centre only
- Beds: 104

History
- Constructed: 2005
- Opened: June 2006

Links
- Website: www.dgt.nhs.uk/patients-and-visitors/visiting-gravesham-community-hospital www.kentcht.nhs.uk/location/gravesham-community-hospital/

Gravesham Community Hospital is a community hospital in Gravesend in the borough of Gravesham in Kent.

== History ==
Plans for the hospital were approved in 2000, for a new community hospital to be built of the site of the former Gravesend and North Kent Hospital, which stood on the site since 1854. The old hospital closed in 2004, and construction for the new hospital started in 2005, and opened in June 2006.

== Services ==
Services include an urgent treatment centre run by Dartford and Gravesham NHS Trust and radiology (x-ray) and outpatient orthopaedic and paediatric services run by Kent Community Health NHS Foundation Trust.
