= Long Reach, Kent =

Long Reach
- Location within Kent
- District: Dartford
- Shire county: Kent
- Region: South East
- Country: England
- Sovereign state: United Kingdom
- Post town: DARTFORD
- Postcode district: DA1
- Dialling code: 01322
- Police: Kent
- Fire: Kent
- Ambulance: South East Coast
- UK Parliament: Dartford

Long Reach is a low-lying area north of Dartford, Kent, in southeast England, on the south side of the River Thames, east of Erith and the River Darent. It was the site of a pub (the Long Reach Tavern), a fireworks factory, a smallpox hospital and, from 1911, a Vickers airfield that later became RAF Joyce Green. It also gives its name to a Thames Water sewage treatment works.

The area is named after the Long Reach (a name given to the longest straight stretch of a river), the stretch of the Thames between St Clement's Reach and Erith Rands.

== Landmarks ==
=== Long Reach Tavern (c. 1800s-1957) ===
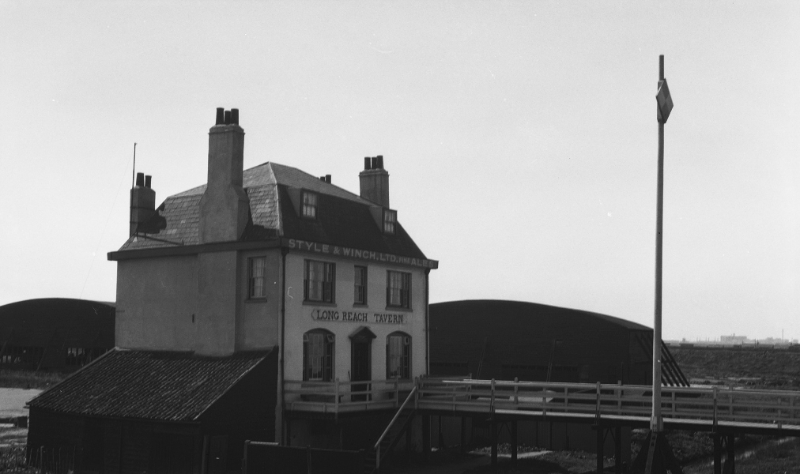
RFC Joyce Green - Long Reach Tavern with RFC hangars in the background 1929

The Long Reach Tavern was a riverside pub that had a jetty extending into the Thames, enabling its use by barge and tugboat crews. It was recorded as a tied house of the Fleet Brewery in 1865, and in 1866 hosted a bare-knuckle boxing championship match between James Mace and Joseph Goss. Damaged by the North Sea flood of 1953, it was demolished in 1957 to allow construction of new flood embankments.

=== Long Reach Hospital ===
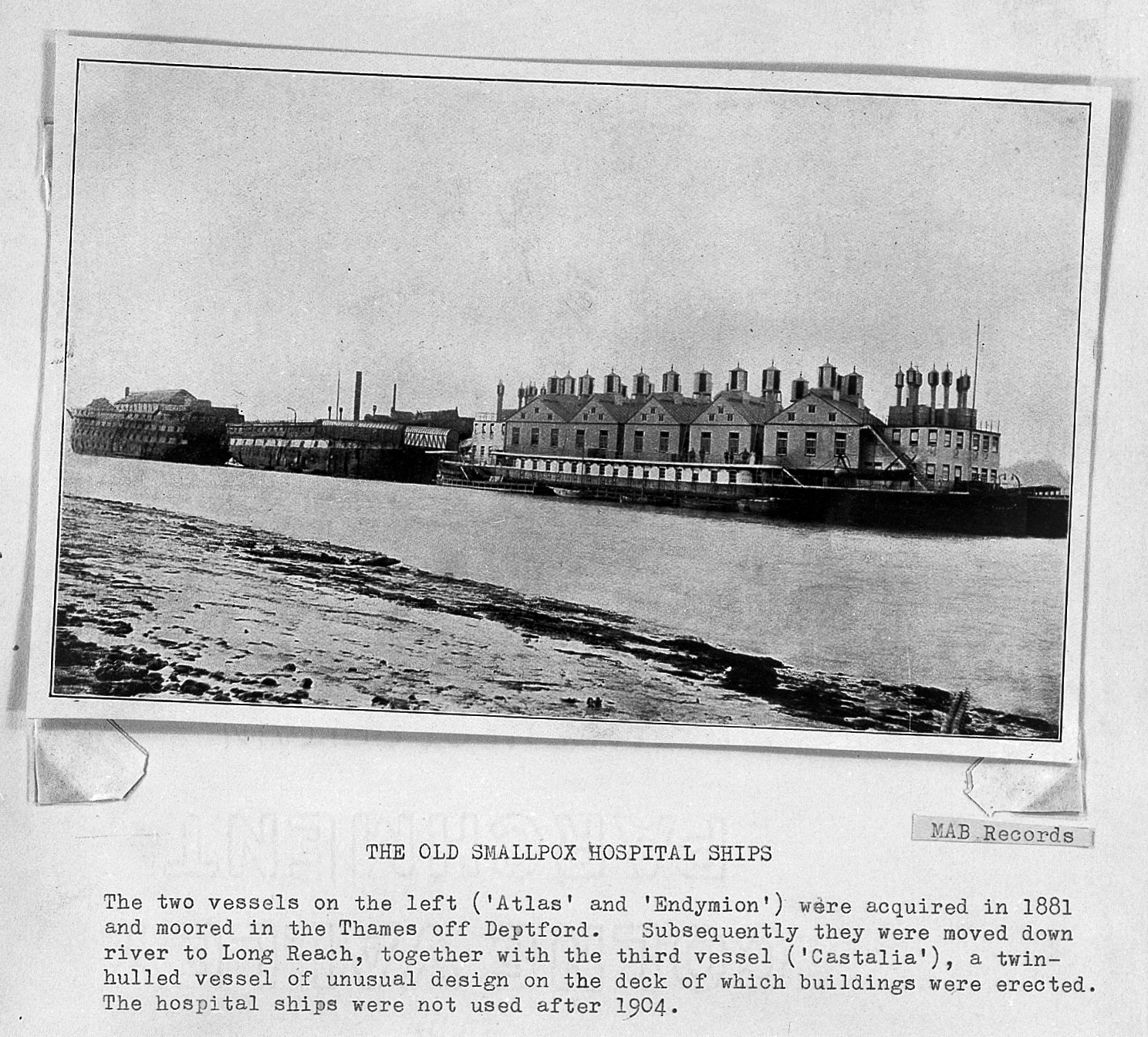
The old smallpox hospital ships, Atlas, Endymion and Castalia

Despite some local opposition, in May 1881, the Metropolitan Asylum Board (MAB) established a temporary tented camp for smallpox patients on land it owned north of Dartford. In 1883, it purchased further land for smallpox camp purposes, including Gore Farm and a strip of land previously owned by the Church Commissioners called Long Reach. Further hospital accommodation was then found aboard two ships initially chartered and later purchased from the Admiralty: the Atlas and the Endymion. A paddle-steamer, Castalia, was later added, with all three moored in the Thames adjacent to Long Reach. Together the three hospital ships provided 350 patient beds, plus administration, stores and staff quarters. Onshore facilities included a laundry, additional nurses accommodation, and an electricity generation building. A pier was constructed so that patients could be brought from London by river ambulance. A permanent convalescent hospital was provided at Gore farm in 1890, and in 1901, Long Reach Hospital was built, followed by the Orchard Hospital. Finally, in 1903, a permanent smallpox hospital – Joyce Green Hospital – opened, and the ships were sold for scrap in 1904.

The permanent Long Reach hospital had 300 beds and admitted its first patients in February 1902. It was retained as a reserve hospital for smallpox patients, and was rebuilt in 1928. In February 1953, the hospital was flooded, but was able to reopen just over a month later. It hosted its last patient in 1973, and in 1974 was demolished to make way for improved flood defences.

=== RAF Joyce Green ===
Joyce Green was one of the first Royal Flying Corps (RFC) airfields. It was established in 1911 by Vickers Limited (the aircraft and weapons manufacturer, who had a factory at nearby Erith) who used it as an airfield and testing ground. At the outbreak of World War I in 1914, the RFC followed and established a base. Subject to frequent flooding and with a reputation as being unsuitable and too dangerous for training, it was eventually replaced by a more suitable site at RAF Biggin Hill.

=== Wells fireworks factory ===
The Wells Fireworks factory was built in the early 1950s, for a business originally established by Joseph Wells, an explosive lighter man, in Dartford in 1837. The 1953 flood caused an explosion at the factory. It closed in the 1970s.

=== Long Reach STW ===
Long Reach sewage treatment works (STW), located on the south bank of the River Thames at 51.4673°N 0.2365°E, is operated by Thames Water. As of 2012, the plant was capable of treating 346 million litres of sewage per day. It treats wastewater from a catchment area of 518 square kilometres (200 sq mi), covering Bexley, Bromley, Croydon, Dartford, Sevenoaks, Tandridge, and from Tonbridge and Malling. It serves a population of over 800,000 people. It is adjacent to the site of the former Littlebrook Power Station, demolished in 2019.
