= Darenth Park Hospital =

Former hospital in Kent, England

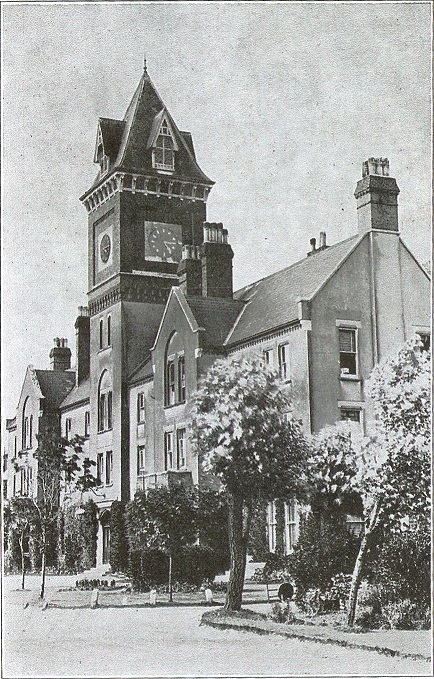
- The Administration Block at Darenth Park Hospital

- Location within Kent

Geography
- Location: Darenth, Kent, England, United Kingdom
- Coordinates: 51°26′6″N 0°15′28″E

History
- Founded: 18 November 1878; 147 years ago
- Closed: 12 August 1988; 38 years ago

Links
- Lists: Hospitals in England

Darenth Park Hospital was a healthcare facility in Darenth near Dartford in Kent, originally founded as Darenth School.

== History ==
The hospital was founded by the Metropolitan Asylums Board in Darenth near Dartford in Kent as Darenth School for 500 children with learning disabilities on 18 November 1878. By 1890 it housed over 1,000 children and adults and included Darenth Asylum. By 1911 part of the site had become the Darenth Industrial Trading Colony, and the institution was becoming almost self-sufficient in food production and the manufacture of everyday items, thanks to its ample supply of free labour.

In 1936, as the age and disability levels of residents increased, the name became Darenth Park Hospital, and in 1948 the management was transferred from the London County Council, which had succeeded the Metropolitan Asylums Board in the management of the institution, to the new National Health Service.

The hospital drew patients from a wide catchment of south-east London and Kent. By 1970 the population had grown to 1,500 and the physical conditions in this grim and vast Victorian building were increasingly unacceptable by modern standards. The hospital had over 40 wards, of which 10 contained more than 50 residents. Finally in 1973 the Regional Health Board agreed to close Darenth, but the funding and planning required for such a major undertaking took years to put in place. In the mid-1970s, Diana Spencer, the future Princess of Wales, undertook voluntary work at the hospital.

Darenth Park was the first large regional learning disability institution to close in England as a result of the British government's emerging Care in the Community policy. Audrey Emerton, the South East Thames Regional Chief nursing officer between 1979 and 1990, guided the replacement programme, and from the early 1980s on nearly a thousand residents were resettled to other hospitals, hostels, small group homes and local facilities. On 12 August 1988, the last residents were transferred and the hospital finally shut its doors.

The buildings have been entirely demolished and the new Darent Valley Hospital has been built on part of the site. A 'village' of 300 new houses was also built and the remaining 100 acres became the Darenth Country Park. The only building surviving from the Asylum is at the former Darenth Park Hospital Farm, now used as the Arrow Riding Centre.

== See also ==
- Healthcare in Kent
