= Darenth Country Park =

Park in Kent, England

- Location within Kent
- Interactive map of Darenth Country Park
- OS grid: TQ627734
- Coordinates: 51°25′51″N 0°15′01″E
- Area: 100 hectares (250 acres)
- Created: 1999
- Operator: Dartford Borough Council
- Open: 7 days a week, dawn until dusk
- Website: Official website

Darenth Country Park is in Darenth near Dartford, in Kent, England. On the site of a former demolished hospital site Darenth Park Hospital, also the site of a scheduled ancient monument and the site of ancient Saxon burials. Due to this protection it was turned into a millennium open-space park.

== History ==
In 1954, General Post Office (GPO) engineers while digging a cable trench past the Hospital, cut through a Saxon grave and also recovered a late 6th century silver gilt square headed brooch and parts of a bronze howl. These finds were then given to the British Museum to research and store.

In 1978, 'Dartford & District Archaeological Group' excavated a trench on the site, before a planning application was made by Associated Portland Cement Manufacturers Ltd. for chalk extraction on the site. This trench found an ancient Saxon burial ground (5th century), with 12 Saxon graves, as well as various artefacts (including a spearhead, brooches and a glass bowl) from the period. The glass bowl is now known as the 'Darenth bowl' (which is known to be dedicated to St. Rufinus of Soissons c.450 A.D.), is now in Dartford Borough Museum. The graves were then deemed important enough to be scheduled as an Ancient Monument.

The hospital buildings were then demolished in 1995. The new Darent Valley Hospital was built on part of the site. Then a 'village' of 300 new houses was also built on a portion and the remaining 100 acres became the Darenth Country Park. The only surviving building is the former 'Darenth Park Hospital Farm', which is now used as a riding school. Arrow Riding School for the disabled. Also survived was The Darenth Hospital War Memorial, which was unveiled on 16 December 1927 by General Fell. It commemorates hospital staff who were killed in both World Wars. Eleven names are from the 1st World War.

The park was developed as a "Changing Places" National Millennium Project

The council employed artist Andy McKeown to work with local schools and community groups to design the sculpture in the park.

In 2004, Kent Thameside Green Grid Design Strategy and Guidelines was produced by Kent County Council. It proposed to extend both Beacon Wood Country Park and Darenth Country Park to create a ‘joined’ Darenth and Beacon Country Park.

== Ecology ==
It is situated on the edge of the North Downs and a portion of the wood (on the northern boundary) in the park, is part of Site of Special Scientific Interest.

The park is within a shallow river valley with the main 'Chestnut Driveway' path marking the bottom of the valley. Which leads East - West to Gore Road (on the eastern edge).

The chalk grassland are used as grazing for farm animals, but some were left to naturalise into wildflower meadows after the park was formed, these grasslands were cleared of scrub to allow the rare chalk land plants and animals to re-establish including the Musk Orchid, and Chalkhill Blue butterfly. This is one of the only three sites within Kent, that Watling Street Thistle, Eryngium campestre can be found.

The park also has 'traditional' orchards planted in 1995. Chapel Orchard has over 150 varieties of apple, pear, plum, cherry and cob nut tree.

Includes apple varieties such as "Kentish Fillibasket" (1820) and "Golden Pippin" (1629) are at the top end of the orchard. Towards the other end of the orchard there are modern dwarf and semi-dwarf varieties, such as "Discovery" and "Red Devil".

In addition there are horse grazing paddocks

== How to get there ==
Head south from the A296 (between Dartford and the A2 to Gravesend), down Gore Road.
