= Harold Barnwell =

English aviation pioneer

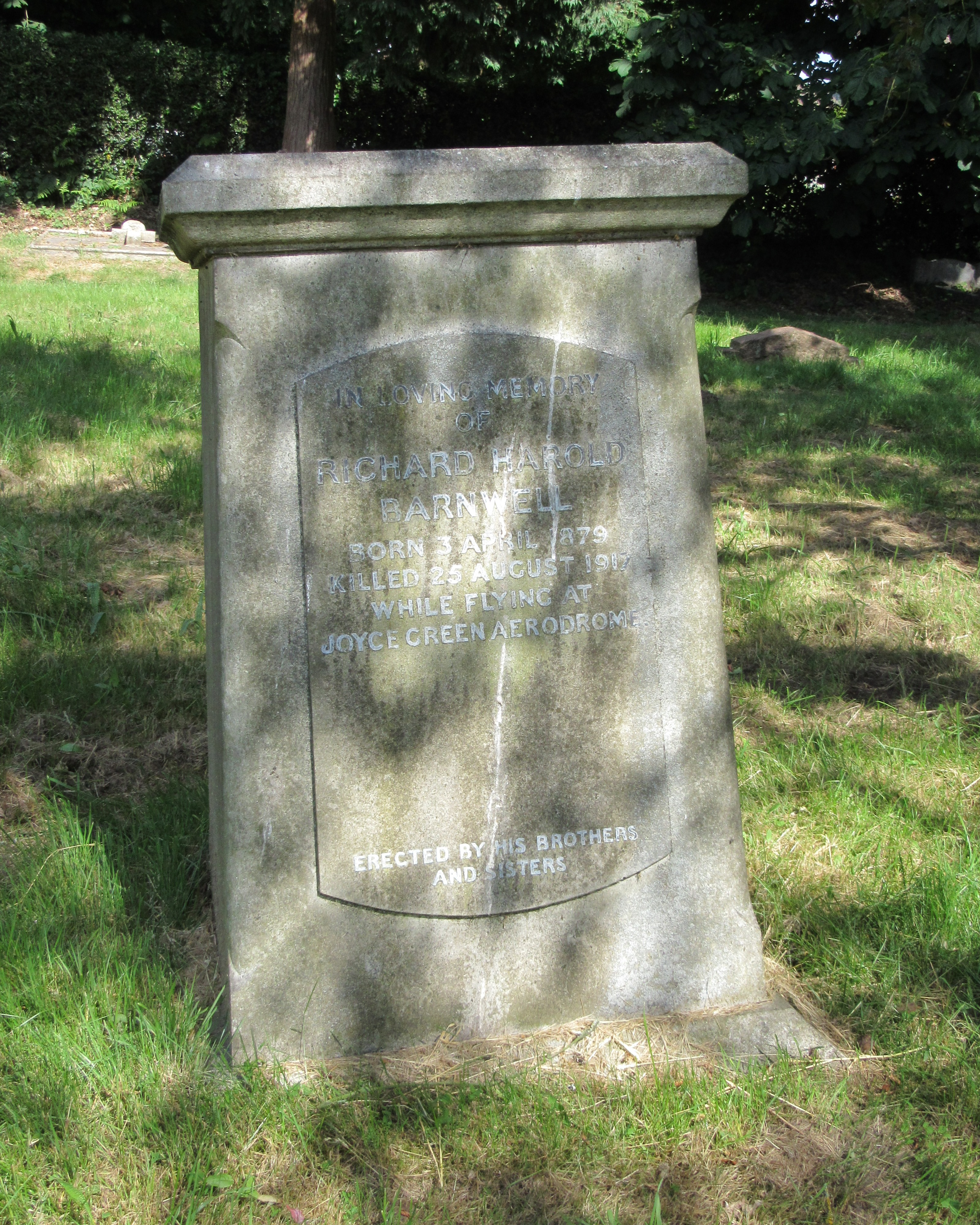
- Grave of (Richard) Harold Barnwell at St Mary the Virgin's Church, Rectory Lane, Byfleet, Woking, Borough of Woking, Surrey, England.
- Born: 3 April 1879; Lewisham, England
- Died: 25 August 1917 (aged 38); Joyce Green, Kent, England
- Occupation: Aircraft pioneer

Richard Harold Barnwell (3 April 1879 – 25 August 1917) was an English aviation pioneer, who began as an aircraft builder. He died while test-flying an early Vickers fighter aircraft.

== Life ==
He was born in Lewisham in southeast London on 3 April 1879, the son of Richard Barnwell, a director of the Clyde shipbuilder Fairfield. Barnwell was brought up at Elcho House in Balfron, Stirlingshire, and educated at Fettes College in Edinburgh. He had a younger brother, Frank.

Frank and Harold Barnwell built their first glider in 1905 in Balfron and later built three powered aircraft. They then opened the Grampian Engineering and Motor Company in 1906 at Causewayhead in Stirling. From their garage, they produced three aircraft between 1908 and 1910. The first was underpowered and failed to fly, but the second, a canard biplane was successfully flown from a field in Causewayhead under the Wallace Monument on 28 July 1909. Piloted by Harold, it only flew 80 yards (75 m) at an altitude of about four metres before it crashed, but it is still recognised as Scotland's first powered flight. Next, the brothers built a monoplane with which Harold won a prize of £50 offered by the Scottish Aeronautical Society for the first flight of more than a mile to be made in Scotland in January 1911.

In 1911 both brothers moved to England, and in 1912 Harold, after gaining his pilot's licence (No.278) at the Bristol school at Brooklands in September joined the staff of the new Vickers School of Flying, also at Brooklands. Here he was the instructor who helped Noel Pemberton Billing win his £50 bet with Frederick Handley Page by learning to fly and gaining a pilot's licence in a single day. In late 1914, Harold Barnwell, now chief test pilot with Vickers Limited, designed a single seat "scout" or fast reconnaissance aircraft, and had it built without the knowledge or approval of his employers, "borrowing" a Gnome Monosoupape rotary engine from Vickers' stores to power the aircraft. Barnwell attempted the first flight of his design, named the "Barnwell Bullet" in early 1915, but the aircraft crashed and was wrecked, possibly due to a miscalculated centre of gravity.

== Death, memorial and legacy ==
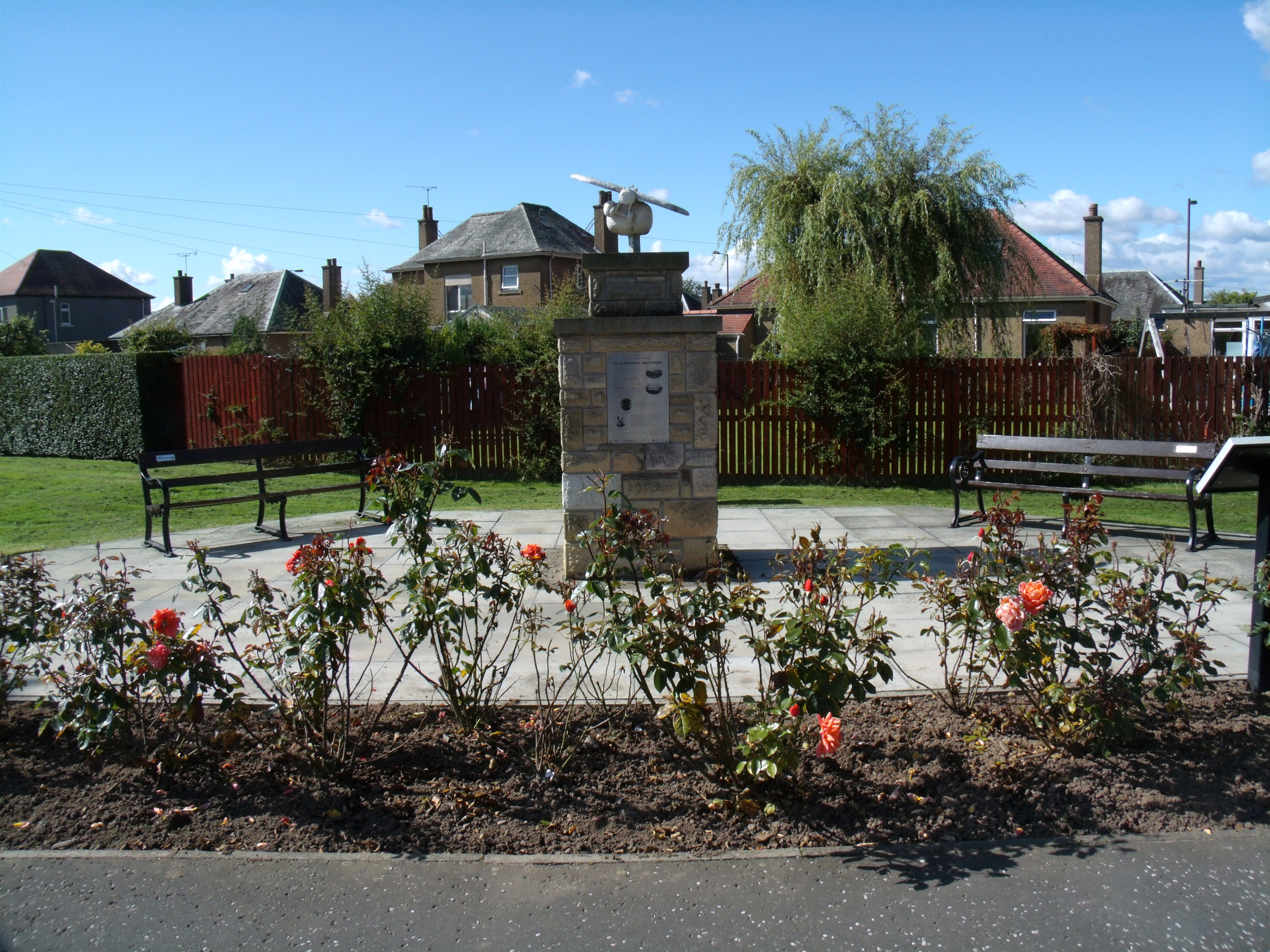
Memorial at Causewayhead, Stirling

Harold Barnwell died on 25 August 1917 while test flying the prototype Vickers Vampire night fighter at Joyce Green, Kent. Webster states that he may have been taken ill while at the controls. Harold was buried near Brooklands in St Mary's Churchyard, Byfleet, Surrey. The grave is marked by an unusual obelisk type of memorial with a simple inscription recording the date and location of his death and that the monument was funded by his brothers and sisters.

A silver granite sculpture with a 3 feet (91 cm) wingspan, set atop a 10-foot (3 m) cairn at Causewayhead in Stirling, yards from the site of the Grampian Motor and Engineering Company, commemorates the brothers' pioneering flights. A plaque to commemorate the centenary of the first flight was erected in Balfron. Some artifacts from the Barnwells' days were discovered before the Grampian Engineering and Motor Company closed. An original wing strut is on display at the Stirling Smith Art Gallery and Museum.
