= Stow Maries Aerodrome =

Former airfield in Stow Maries, Essex, England

- Near Stow Maries, Essex in England
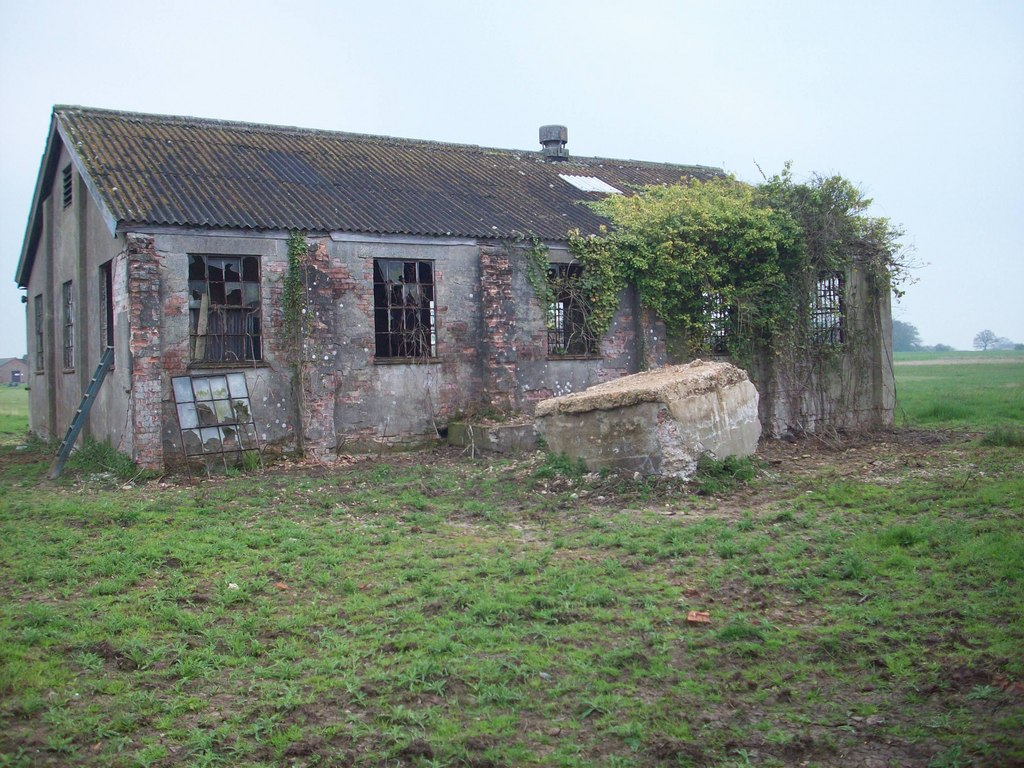
- Abandoned building at Stow Maries

Site information
- Type: Home Defence (HD) airfield
- Owner: Air Ministry
- Operator: Royal Flying Corps; Royal Air Force
- Open to the public: Yes

Location
- Shown within Essex Stow Maries Aerodrome (the United Kingdom)
- Coordinates: 51.670443°N 0.632104°E
- Grid reference: TL820001
- Area: 118 acres (48 ha)

Site history
- Built: August 1916
- In use: May 1917–April 1919

Garrison information
- Past commanders: Claude Alward Ridley

Airfield information
Runways
Direction	Length and surface
	Grass

Stow Maries Aerodrome (Note: The base was classified as an aerodrome by the Air Ministry of the time as it did not have paved runways but it consisted of a grassed field which allowed aircraft to take-off and land in any direction no matter from which way the wind was blowing.) is a historical airfield located in the village of Stow Maries, Essex, England. The airfield was in use by the Royal Flying Corps (latterly the Royal Air Force) during the First World War. It has been given listed status on account of being the best preserved airfield complete with First World War era buildings and is open to the public as a visitor attraction.

== History ==
The site, which is 3.7 miles (6 km) southwest of Maldon in Essex, was first surveyed as a possible aerodrome in August 1916, but it was not ready to accept aircraft until May 1917. The aerodrome was built as a direct response to the threat of German Zeppelin and Gotha bomber raids on the London area. It was built as part of a plan to site airfields from Dover to Edinburgh to prevent inland penetration of hostile forces. Each base was to be sited 10 miles (16 km) to 30 miles (48 km) apart from the other.

In April 1918, the aerodrome was handed over to the newly formed Royal Air Force, who instituted a survey in October of the same year which determined that the base had a complement of 219 personnel and 16 Camel aircraft assigned to No. 37 Squadron (Home Defence). Some of the buildings were not yet finished, and it is thought that after the armistice in November 1918, works may have been halted, but some buildings were completed in December 1918. The domestic accommodation was furnished with enough space for 204 men and 15 women. By the time of the abandonment of the base in 1919, it had over 500 personnel and 36 aircraft based there. Originally the aircraft were housed in two Bessonneau Hangars, but these were replaced with two permanent structures in 1917.

A gap in the hedge surrounding the airfield is known as Milburn's Gap. In April 1918, Lieutenant Cyril Milburn's Sopwith Camel aircraft went through the gap after it stalled on take-off, killing the pilot. The aircraft were known to be unreliable and of the ten pilots killed operating from Stow Maries, eight died in accidents whilst two were shot down by the Royal Navy. Milburn is buried in the graveyard of the Church of Saint Mary and Saint Margaret in Stow Maries village, under his real name of Edward Gerald Mucklow.

The base was not re-used during the Second World War, although it was surveyed twice, bombed by the enemy (as it was left looking like an airfield) and saw at least one Hurricane from 242 Squadron land there after it was damaged during an aerial battle in 1940. The buildings, grassed fields and most of the surrounding area were returned to agriculture. In 1997, the Royal Commission for Historical Monuments in England (RCHME), surveyed the site and found evidence of 47 buildings. At least twenty-four of the original buildings have survived (and these have all been given grade II* listed status). In 2009, efforts were made by a group of enthusiasts to return the base to use as a light aerodrome and museum as it was the most complete World War I era aerodrome left in England. In 2017, the Duke of Gloucester formally opened the second museum building on the site.

== Notable people ==
Claude Alward Ridley – Pilot who commanded No. 37 Squadron whilst based at Stow Maries
