= RAF Joyce Green =

RAF Joyce Green
- Near Long Reach, Kent in England
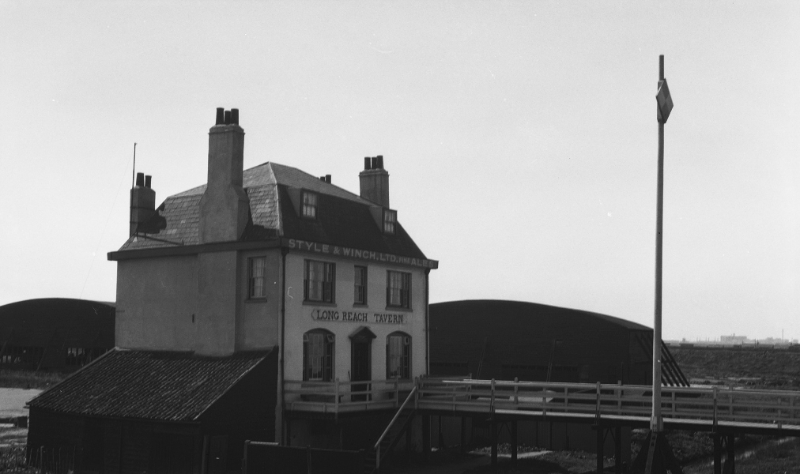
- Long Reach Tavern with RFC hangars

Site information
- Type: Airfield
- Owner: Air Ministry
- Operator: Royal Flying Corps; Air Service, United States Army
- Condition: Closed

Location
- Shown within Kent RAF Joyce Green (the United Kingdom)
- Coordinates: 51°28′27″N 0°13′00″E
- Height: beneath mean tide level

Site history
- Built: 1911
- In use: 1911–1919
- Demolished: Oct 1919
- Battles/wars: First World War

Joyce Green, at Long Reach, near Dartford, was one of the first Royal Flying Corps (RFC) airfields. It was established in 1911 by Vickers Limited (the aircraft and weapons manufacturer) who used it as an airfield and testing ground. At the outbreak of World War I in 1914, the RFC followed and established a base. Subject to frequent flooding and a reputation as being unsuitable and too dangerous for training, it was eventually replaced by a more suitable site at RAF Biggin Hill.

There were two parts to Joyce Green's military operations; the RFC, and the Wireless Experimental establishment. The latter were the first to move out in 1917 (after exhaustive searching south of London) when they found an ideal site on a farmer's field near the village of Biggin Hill; the RFC were soon to recognize the new site's suitability for flying and its strategic location, and soon followed, transferring there on 13 February 1917. The RFC took with them their Bristol Fighters, leaving Joyce Green with only a pilots pool and ground crew. Once the RFC had moved out of the aerodrome, Vickers continued their testing work, until moving to Brooklands aerodrome. Following the Armistice with Germany the airfield was closed by December 1919.

== The site ==
Joyce Green farm, a cattle farm to the north of Dartford, lent its name to the largely uninhabited area 15 miles (24 km) downstream of London Bridge, located between Dartford and the River Thames. The aerodrome itself was on part of a plot once known as Franks Farm, on ground reclaimed from the Dartford salt marshes.

The only habitation in the area, apart from the odd farm, was the isolated "Long Reach Tavern", known for organized bare-knuckle boxing matches in the 19th century, notably Tom Sayers who fought there between 1851-1854, and a ferry to Purfleet on the opposite bank of the Thames. A 'reach' is a length of a river between two bends and the longest reach on the Thames is 'Long Reach' hence the name of the Tavern. The surrounds of the tavern were to become the RFC encampment.

1:62260/1:50000 OS map sheets 171/177 : (51): OS survey grid reference: TQ 542774. County: Kent, Area : 121 acres : 1200 x 1000 yards. Slightly below sea level.

The airfield consisted of a grass landing field, slightly below sea level, criss-crossed by ditches covered with boards; a 121 acres (49 ha) site, 1200 x 1000 yards of low-lying marshland below mean tide level, bordered by the River Darent to the west, the Thames to the north, the tavern's access road "Joyce Green Lane" (running north to south) to the east, and the grounds of the Joyce Green Hospitals to the south.

Further to the west of the tavern across the estuary of the River Darent was the Thames Ammunition factory. Along the river to its east was the nearby Long Reach Hospital, where the three smallpox isolation hospital ships had been moored on the Reach; they had been scrapped in 1904 leaving just the adjacent land-based hospital facilities intact. Further to the south and east were the Dartford salt marshes.

Also in the area to the south were the Joyce Green and Orchard Hospitals with a small military (Army) unit attached to them. The hospitals were set up for the isolation of smallpox patients from London. Further to the south the main A206 road gave access to London. It is two miles from Dartford railway station and 1½ miles from Erith railway station.

The RFC buildings and camp were at the north end by the Thames, grouped to the immediate south and west of the Long Reach Tavern. The RFC had six hangars in total; three aeroplane sheds, 80 x 60 feet, as a treble unit, and another three sheds, 80 x 50 feet, as a treble unit.

== Vickers 1910-1919 ==
The site was first used in 1910 by Hiram Maxim who in conjunction with Vickers had built a biplane at Crayford, and at Joyce Green unsuccessfully attempted a test flight; without funds to continue developing his ideas, Maxim parted company with Vickers to form a new company with Louis Bleriot and Claude Grahame White.

Vickers were to persist with aircraft development and establishing an (Aviation Department) in 1911, and promptly built hangars and workshop facilities at Joyce Green for testing the aeroplanes constructed at their Erith works. Vickers had factories at nearby Bexleyheath, Crayford, Erith and Dartford. The Vickers hangars and buildings were grouped at the south end of the site near to the entrance gates.

Once assembled aircraft were stripped down piece-small and moved by road from Erith, through the streets of Crayford to Joyce Green and returned the same way.

Vickers' first monoplane was tested at their new airfield in July 1911, using an under-license French-built rear fuselage and engine designed and made by the Frenchman Robert Esnault-Pelterie (hence R.E.P.) (the rest of the components being Vickers-built), it made its maiden flight, piloted by Captain Herbert F. Wood, the manager of Vickers' aviation department.

Development of the aircraft was rapid; the No. 8 monoplane was built by 1913 at the Erith factory. However the Army Manoeuvres in the autumn of 1912 proved disastrous for the type: four RFC officers were killed using monoplanes, and this led to a suspension of the type by the Military Wing.

Shortly before the war started, among the many designs initiated by the Drawing Office was one known as the 'Hydravion', based on the notion that an aeroplane should be able to take off from water as well as from land. Floats, made of Duralumin at the Dartford works, were tested in the nearby River Darent. Archives at the company headquarters imply that the Hydravion was to be constructed at Dartford, despite the factory only producing explosives and projectiles at the time.

In 1912 Vickers commenced work on a two-seat pusher biplane, the F.B.1 (Fighting Biplane 1), it was one of the first aircraft designed to carry a machine gun, the FB5 (fighting biplane) Gun Bus. The company abandoned plans for float planes at the start of the war and concentrated on land-based aircraft.

Vickers No. 8 monoplane at the Erith factory 1913.

In 1914, the company's works at Crayford took over the production of Vickers aircraft. Development of variants of F.B. series continued apace. The last of these variants the F.B.5, eventually emerged as the Gunbus; of the first batches two were sent to the RFC to be based at the airfield. Experimental work continued during the war evolving the basic Gunbus into the FB9, known as the 'Streamline Gunbus'.

During World War I it produced the Vimy heavy bomber; the FB27 Vimy Prototype built at the Vickers Crayford works was assembled and flown out of Joyce Green. The plane was found to be too large for the hangars; Vickers had to dig out the ground inside them, for them to fit. See photo, right.

This first prototype B9952 made its first flight on 30 November 1917 at Joyce Green, piloted by Capt. Gordon Bell. The company had planned to use a pair of Royal Aircraft Factory 200 hp 4d air-cooled V-12 engines, however they were not ready in time (production was later abandoned) and the plane was fitted two 200 hp Hispano-Suizas instead. By April 1918 it was decided use a Rolls-Royce Eagle engine instead. The aeroplane went into production that month and was at that point named the Vickers Vimy. Ironically, it was never used operationally in the First World War.

In 1919 Vickers moved their aircraft production from Crayford to Brooklands aerodrome at Weybridge in Surrey. The plane's main claim to fame was that on 14/15 June 1919, Captain Jack Alcock and Lieutenant Arthur Whitten-Brown in a converted Vimy (built at Weybridge), made the world's first non-stop trans-oceanic flight, across the Atlantic. Later at the end of 1919 Ross and Keith Smith flew a Vimy all the way to Australia, thus highlighting the possibility of organising scheduled overseas longhaul flights.

Vickers would soon by December 1919 move their test facilities to Brooklands in Surrey.

== Royal Flying Corps 1914–1919 ==
The Royal Flying Corps (RFC) was established in May 1912. Initially the RFC regularly visited Joyce Green for testing and reviewing prototype aircraft. After the outbreak of war in 1914, Joyce Green became an ‘air defence’ airfield to protect London from bombing raids by Zeppelins. The airfield was to house a permanent RFC unit, under No. 6 Wing, and the first occupants were No. 10 Reserve Squadron with a variety of aircraft including Henry Farman's, Vickers FB5 and FB9, DH2 and FE8 machines. The role of this unit was to receive pupils from preliminary training schools for final training for their wings. Each course consisted of about 20 pupils and lasted two or three weeks. This included time spent at Lydd where aerial gunnery was practised at the Hythe range. On gaining their wings the young pilots would get a 48-hour pass before being posted to the Front.

It was decided that the aerodrome should house two FB5 Gunbuses, and they were transferred from Netheravon. No.6 Wing was appointed to oversee operations, and the training of potential pilots.

Concurrently the erection of hangars, workshops and ground staff quarters commenced at the northern edge of the landing field alongside the Long Reach Tavern.

On Christmas Day 1914, the field was to see its first action when 2Lt M. R. Chidson and gunner Cpl Martin were in a Gunbus were sent up in pursuit of a German plane, Friedrichshafen FF.29, a single-engined, two-seater float plane belonging to See Flieger-Abteilung I (Flyer department I) of the Imperial German Navy, based at Zeebrugge in Belgium. Unfortunately the gun jammed over Purfleet, and the gunner (having forgotten his gloves) found his hands too cold could not clear the mechanism, thus leaving the German free to drop two bombs on Cliffe railway station. Nevertheless, the Gunship did chase the German aircraft as far as the Nore sandbank. At the time the German plane was mistaken as a Taube monoplane it being an aircraft type that people knew (in the same way that Second World War German pilots always claimed to have been shot down by a Spitfire, when it was probably a Hurricane).

The airfield soon proved unpopular, being situated primarily on marshland.

Early in 1915, the construction of the Royal Flying Corps base at Joyce Green was completed and No.10 Reserve Squadron moved in. Equipped with Henry Farman, Vickers FB5 and FB9, DH2 and FE8 aeroplanes, the squadron's main function was to receive pupils from preliminary training schools for final training and qualifications for their wings. There were many accidents and quite a few trainee pilots were killed. The Long Reach Tavern, was closed, the Salmon family were moved out, and the RFC took it over as a canteen and used it for sleeping quarters.

On 19–20 January 1915 the Imperial German Navy mounted the first airship raid on Britain. Three Zeppelins (L3, L4 and L6) were despatched; one was forced to turn back with engine difficulties 90 miles from the English coast. The remaining airships bombed Great Yarmouth and King's Lynn, killing 2 civilians of Yarmouth and injuring 3, and killing 2 and injuring 13 civilians of King's Lynn. These were the first British Military casualties due to air attack.

The first night air defence sorties are flown by the Royal Flying Corps (RFC). Following the attack by Zeppelins L3 and L4, two Vickers FB5 Gunbuses of No.7 Squadron were ordered to take-off from Joyce Green and patrol over the southern outskirts of London, without result.

James Thomas Byford McCudden VC DSO (and Bar), MC (and Bar), Croix de Guerre, one of the most highly decorated air aces in the First World War, arrived at Joyce Green in March 1917 to take up the appointment of Wing Fighting Instructor. McCudden had shot down fifty-seven German aeroplanes by the time he was 22. His job involved teaching combat duties to the more advanced pupils.

In mid April 1915, No. 39 Home Defence Squadron was formed bringing together all units and detachments detailed for anti-Zeppelin raid duties in the London area.

In October 1915 a BE2c was posted here, and the machine fitted with a bomb rack. On October 13 the station would put up five aircraft against Zeppelins L13, L14, L15, and L16; two would land safely after the action. In particular 2/Lt Claude Ridley took off from Joyce Green in a BE2c and spotted the airship for a brief moment in searchlights. He fired off 20 rounds at extreme range but then lost sight of the airship.

Dartford played an important role in the defence of London. Anti-aircraft guns were sited on the River Brent, Dartford Heath and the Dartford Marshes, and dozens of searchlights and listening posts were erected in the district. The total number of air raids in or near Dartford (1914–18) was thirty-seven. Despite large numbers of high explosive and incendiary bombs dropped on the area, no-one was killed in Dartford as a direct result of these air raids.

Zeppelins generated enough fear that the lord mayor of London offered a £500 prize to the first pilot or gun crew to shoot one down on British soil, an award claimed by members of an anti-aircraft gun emplacement sited on the Brent at Dartford. The gun crew played an important part in bringing down Zeppelin L15.

The units and detachments under No.19 reserve squadron around London for anti-zeppelin defence were reorganized on 15 April 1916 as the No.39 Home Defence Squadron. Zeppelin operations moved to the north of London leaving Joyce Green on the southern perimeter.

On 22 March 1917 McCudden arrived to instruct advanced students (including Mannock) on combat techniques. McCudden would return here two more times in his career in Nov 1917 and Apr 1918.

Later in Autumn 1917 the threat came from Gotha bombers which had started raiding London. The Gotha had been based at Ostend as early as the spring of 1917. In one week that year, the German planes passed over Dartford three nights in succession; the Brent guns firing nearly a thousand rounds at the raiders.

63 TS were moved to Redcar on 13 February 1919, and the aerodrome was left only a pilots pool; and ground crew mainly composed of USAAF personnel on final training duties awaiting deployment to France.

== Wireless Testing Park ==
In 1914 the RFC took over the Marconi Company experimental section at Brooklands in Surrey (formed in early 1911) and turned it into a wireless training school for pilots and engineers; under the command of Major Charles Prince, a former a Marconi engineer. The existing regulations had been that all communications work for the RFC had to be undertaken by the Royal Engineers. This resulted in conflicts of interest and views between the two organisations and things rapidly came to a head, and a decision was taken to separate the two bodies, resulting was that in August 1915 most of the wireless research work was sent to Woolwich, and the RFC wireless staff were despatched to a new site at Joyce Green.

The move was at first welcomed, as despite its pre-war success the Brooklands aerodrome was unsuitable for training and testing due to close proximity of high obstacles and electrical interference.

The Wireless Testing Park moved to this busy airfield in August 1915 on a convoy of trucks. Training, testing and wireless experiments, and work started. immediately while around them young men practised war, throwing flour bombs as they tried to make their cumbersome Henry Farman Trainers fly. The first ground to air upward message was sent in 1915 at the aerodrome by Major Prince, calling Captain J. M. Furnival as he circled the field in his aircraft. 'Hello Furnie. If you can hear me now it will be the first time speech has ever been communicated to an aeroplane in flight.' 'Hello Furnie if you can hear me dip your wings". The aeroplane, at its top speed of 50 mph, responded with 'an obedient lurch.'

Despite ongoing bureaucratic difficulties the team successfully and developed a practical aircraft telephony set towards the end of 1915; the Mark One weighing only 20 lbs (9 kg). This being the first operational air to ground wireless telephony equipment in the world. Prince made a report: ‘It seemed almost beyond hope to achieve really practical wireless telephony from an aeroplane, but the difficulties have been overcome, and the new set is by no means a toy, or only of scientific interest. A new and amazing power is conferred by it.’

By May 1916, 306 aircraft and 542 ground stations were equipped with spark wireless and crystal set receivers.

Also, despite Princes best attempts, four-fifths of the work for the RFC was officially still undertaken by the Royal Engineers Signals Experimental Establishment. Only one RFC officer was allowed on the premises at any one time, and he was unable to bring any influence to bear the designs and equipment they produced. Of a dozen new sets the RFC submitted to the Wireless Testing Park, all were subjected to damning comments such as ‘a monument of incompetence’ ‘hopelessly bad design’ and ‘a primitive attempt to get round real difficulties’.

As time progressed it became ever more apparent that the field of aviation radiophonics was too different from that of the army that the two services required to be separated.

== Reasons why Joyce Green was replaced by Biggin Hill ==
Air Vice Marshal Gould Lee wrote in his book "Open Cockpit", chapter 17: ‘To use this waterlogged field for testing every now and then was reasonable and to take advantage of it as an emergency landing ground for Home Defence forces was credible, but to employ it as a flying training station was folly and as a Camel training station was lunacy. A pupil taking off with a choked or failing engine had to choose, according to wind direction, between drowning in the Thames (half a mile wide at this point), or crashing into the Vickers TNT works, or hitting one of their several high chimney stacks, or sinking into a vast sewage farm, or killing himself and numerous patients in a large isolation hospital, or being electrocuted in an electrical substation with acres of pylons and cables; or trying to turn and get back to the aerodrome. Unfortunately, many pupils confronted with disaster tried the last course and span to their deaths.’

Jimmy McCudden VC in his book "Flying Fury" described the airfield (where he and others like of Mick Mannock VC spent much time) as a "quiet little spot near Dartford", below sea level at the side of the Thames. The Corp resided in a wooden barrack block, and the actual airfield (grass runways) were located almost next to the River Thames, where many pilots lost their lives by drowning.

The Wireless Radio Unit found the foul weather, incessant mist, the state of the ground, the cold, and damp at Joyce Green non conducive to the best research. Numerous accidents, several fatalities and the planned formation of the Royal Air Force in 1918, led to the Wireless Testing Park eventually being moved in February 1917 to Biggin Hill.

The Sopwith Camel was a demanding plane of all but the most experienced pilot, and had had a fearsome reputation for spinning out of control during tight turns, causing the deaths of many young pilots during their training period.

== US Army Air Service 1917-1919 ==
Prior to its eventual closure, the airfield hosted some of the earliest elements of the US Army Air Service to arrive in Europe. Three flights of the 8th Aero Squadron USAAS arrived on 24 Dec 2017, soon to be dispersed elsewhere, leaving a ground unit which eventually departed in May 2018 for Thetford.

None of the many USAS squadrons in the UK were flying units. When squadrons arrived from the States, pilots were attached to British units for further training and some were attached to operational squadrons in France. The ground crews were attached to British training units to learn maintenance procedures. A considerable number of USAS squadrons were construction squadrons and had no flying or maintenance personnel; they were charged with aerodrome construction.

Ground crew from the 149th Aero Squadron an Instructional flying squadron (Pursuit), were here in May 1918. The squadron was established 7 December 1917, and assigned to the American Expeditionary Force (AEF) from 5 March 1918. It was transferred to France to the 3d Air Instructional Center at Issoudun Aerodrome, and demobilized March 1919. One of the aircrew Private Carroll H. Bunch, an aerial photographer, took several photographs of the field and facilities when the squadron was based there.

Ground crew elements of the 159th Aero Squadron a Day Bombardment) squadron, were here sometime between 15 March, and 25 October 1918. The squadron was established 7 December 1917, and assigned to the American Expeditionary Force (AEF), it was transferred to France from Codford on 2 November.

== Closure ==
After a Whitsun public display in May 1919, Vickers began pulling out for Brooklands in earnest.

Following the Armistice with Germany Joyce Green was declared surplus to requirements in October 1919 and was restored to agricultural use by Dec. All of the hangars had been dismantled by 1939.

The Long Reach Tavern would eventually close in 1957, and was demolished in the late 1950s.

== Role of Operations ==
Unit	Date from	Date to	Notes
Manufacturer's Aerodrome for Vickers Ltd	1911	1919	
Home Defence (HD)	October 1914		
Night Landing Ground (NLG)	October 1914		
Royal Naval Air Service (RNAS)	October 1914		
HD Advanced Base, Royal Flying Corps (RFC)	October 1914	1915	
HD NLG 1st for 39 (HD) Sqn, 50 (HD) Sqn and 112 (HD) Sqn RFC/RAF	1916	1919	
Training Squadron Station RFC/RAF	July 1915	October 1918	
Wireless Testing Park RFC	October 1916	January 1917	
Pilots’ Pool RAF	October 1918	December 1919	

== Royal Flying Corps / Royal Air Force: resident units and aircraft ==
Unit	Date	From	Date	To	Aircraft	Notes
No. 1 Sqn HD detachment	October 1914	Brooklands	November 1914	Brooklands		
No. 1 RAS HD detachment	19 December 1914	Farnborough	December 1914	Farnborough		
No. 7 Sqn HD detachment	22 December 1914	Netheravon	December 1914	Netheravon		
No. 2 RAS HD detachment	July 1915	Brooklands	1 September 1915	Absorbed into No. 10 RAS		
No. 10 RAS/RS/TS	1 September 1915	Formed ex No. 2 RAS nucleus	1 September 1917	Ternhill		
5th Wing HD detachment	8 September 1915	Gosport & 23 Sqn	1 February 1916	Attached to No. 19 RS Hounslow		
No. 10 RAS HD detachment	31 January 1916	Detached from parent unit	31 January 1916	Farningham		
No. 10 RAS HD detachment	1 February 1916	Farningham	1 February 1916	Re-joined parent unit		
No. 22 RS B Flt nucleus	June 1916	Formed, attached to No. 10 RS	24 August 1916	En route for Egypt		
Wireless Testing Park	21 October 1916	Brooklands	1 January 1917	Biggin Hill		
No. 63 TS	1 June 1917	Ternhill	5 October 1918	Redcar		
No. 10 TDS B Flt nucleus	15 October 1917	Formed, attached to No. 63 TS	1 October 1917	Feltwell		
8th Aero Squadron USAAS HQ*	24 December 1917	Flower Down*	1 May 1918	Thetford		
8th Aero Squadron USAAS flights	24 December 1917	Flower Down*	December 1917	Northolt, Thetford and Wyton		
Pool of Pilots	5 October 1918	Manston	December 1919	Disbanded		

== Wing chain of command ==
Wing	Date from	Date to	Notes
6th Wing	September 1915		
18th Wing	12 April 1916		
6th Wing	January 1917		
58th Wing, 1 (Training) Group, SE Area	1918		
18th Wing, SE Area	*1919		
49th Wing, HD Group, SE Area, VI Brigade	1918		

Notes:

- Units and location marked with an * were ground units and non-flying stations.
- HD = Home Defence
- NLG = Night Landing Ground
- RAS = Reserve Aeroplane Squadron: when the squadrons of the RFC went to France in 1914, the remaining machines were grouped into the original Reserve Aeroplane Squadron, which became a training unit. When further such units were formed, numbering was introduced.
- RS = Reserve Squadron: the RAS was re-titled RS in January 1916 and by July of that year was classified as either Elementary (for initial training) or Higher (for type specialisation). 10 RS was one of the latter, being dedicated to turning out pilots for 'pusher' scouts, DH2 and FE8.
- TDS = Training Depot Station: these were introduced during the autumn of 1917 in an attempt to streamline the training system. Hitherto, pilots had undertaken elementary training at one station and moved to another for higher training - a waste of time and resources. TDS provided all-through training and had type specialisations.
- TS = Training Squadron: the RS were re-designated TS on 31 May 1917, to more accurately reflect their role. That coincided with 10 TS switching bases with 63 TS, as a response to the Gotha raids on SE England - 63 TS had Sopwith Pups and DH5s as part of its equipment and was given temporary HD duty.
- The Wireless Testing Park had arrived as a nucleus from Brooklands and was an out-station of the Signals Experimental Establishment at Woolwich.
- No. 63 TS was given temporary HD duty during the summer of 1917.
- The Pool of Pilots comprised a concentration of pilots awaiting posting to units at home and overseas.
- Above three tables are from the National Archives. The six-part RAF Quarterly Survey of Stations, Autumn 1918 (AIR 1/452/15/312/26 & AIR 1/453/15/312/26).

== Some notable officers who served at the aerodrome ==
- Mick Mannock
- James McCudden
- Harry Goode
- Albert Gregory Waller
- Selden Herbert Long
- A. S. G. Lee
- Herman W von Poellnitz ("Von Pip")
- G. R. McCubbin who shot down Max Immelmann
- G. W. Mapplebeck

== Gallery ==
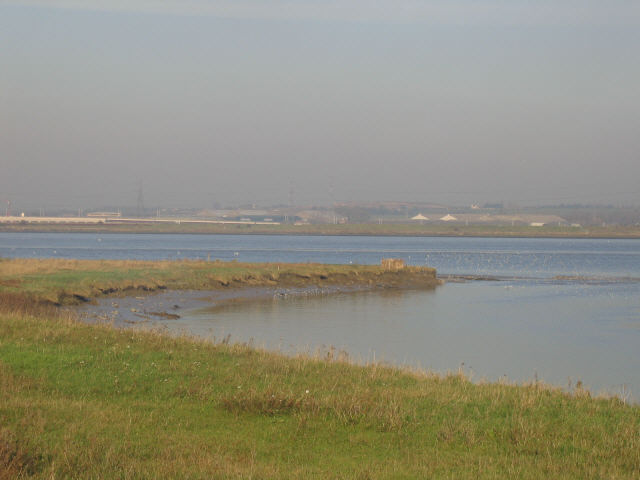
Where the rivers Darent and Thames meet

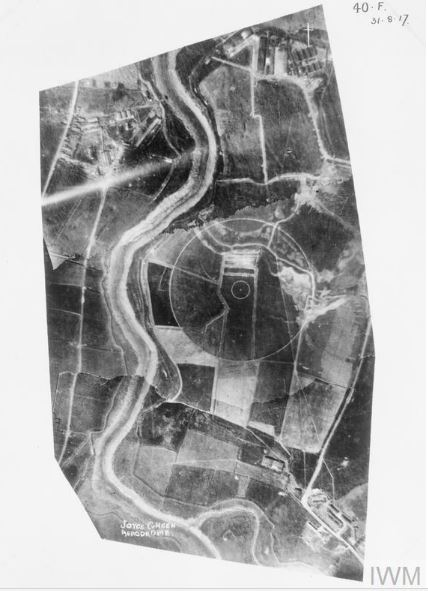
RAF Aerial photograph of the Aerodrome in August 1917

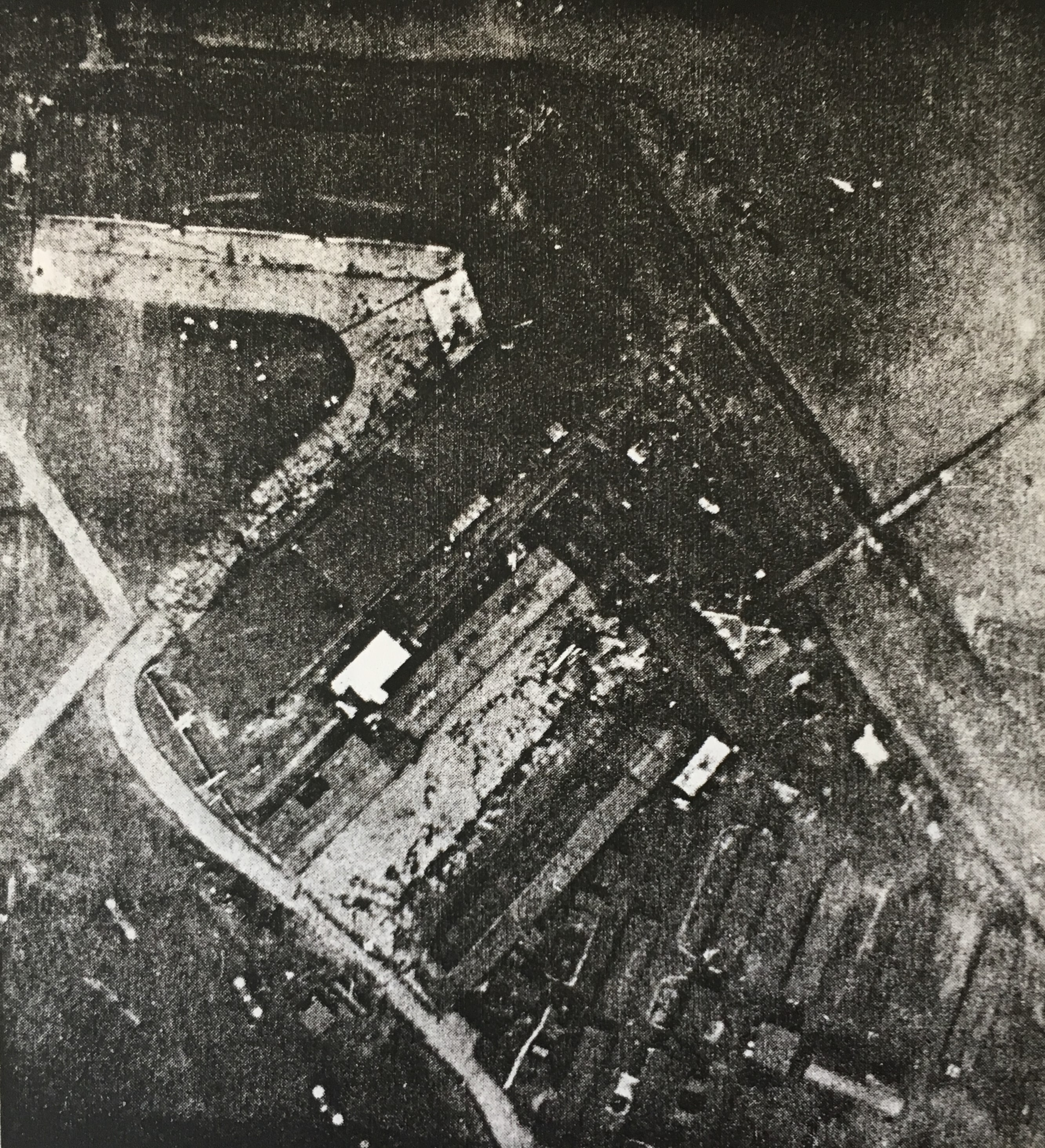
RAF Aerial photograph of the Aerodrome on 28 Feb 1918

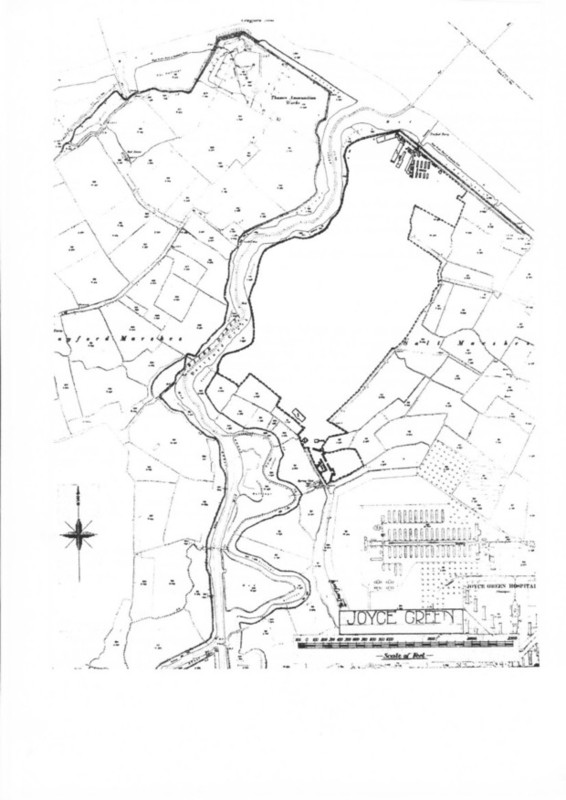
RFC Site plan 1918, (not showing the drainage ditches or Joyce Green Lane)

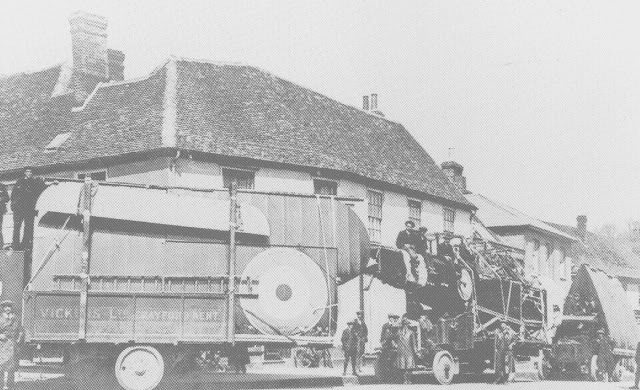
Dismantled Vickers Vimy on its way to Joyce Green outside "The Bear and Ragged Staff", Crayford

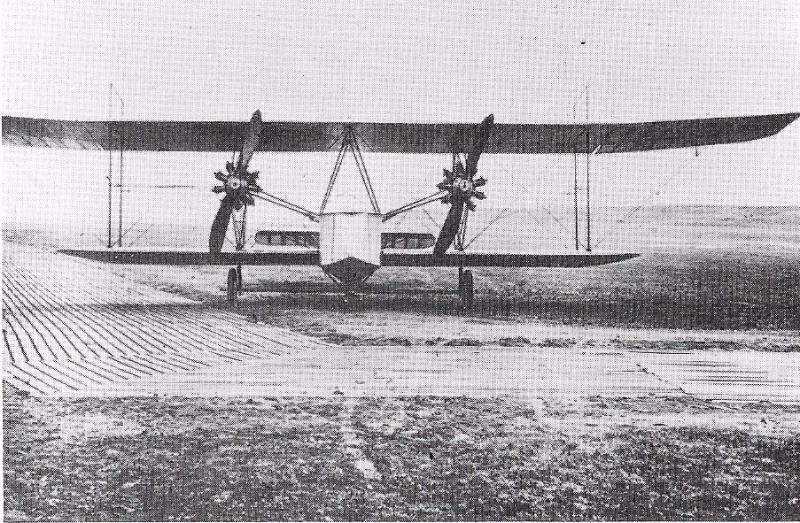
Ditch boards at Joyce Green, with a Vickers Vimy

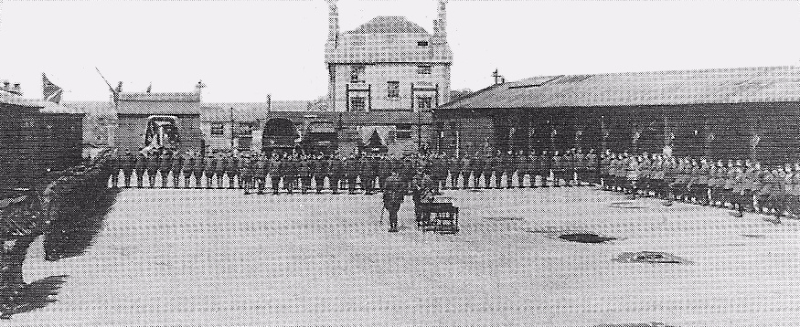
Pay parade in the station motor vehicle yard, behind the Long Reach Tavern 1917

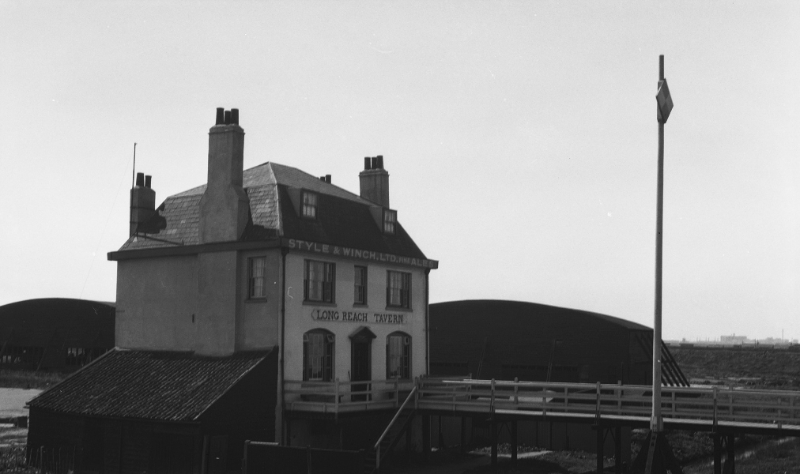
Long Reach Tavern with the RFC hangars in the background, note the Thames riverside mile marker post

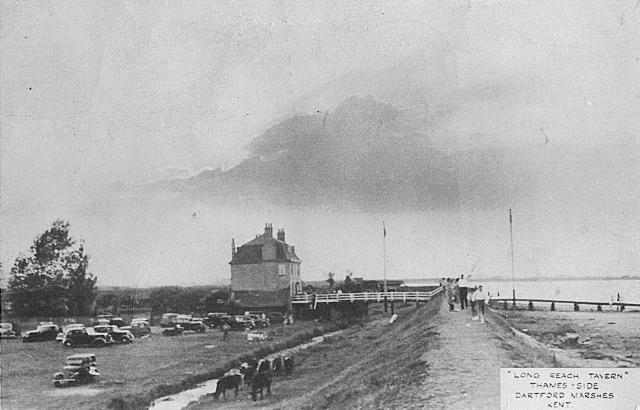
The Tavern on 6 August 1939 when the Mauretania sailed past. The RFC are long gone; note the Thames mile post markers

The dashed line on the plan from the RAF Quarterly Survey of Stations, Autumn 1918, indicates the aerodrome boundaries - as it does on all the plans in TNA AIR1 452 and 453. The RFC/RAF buildings were mainly on the northern boundary, in and around Long Reach Tavern. The Vickers buildings to the far south. The plan was drawn on existing 25 mile to the inch OS maps, so existing surrounding buildings show, e.g. Outside the base is the Joyce Green hospital in the far SE corner. The Orchard Hospital to its immediate left.

== Accidents and incidents ==
Some notable accidents and incidents involving military aircraft:

The first fatalities occurred on 13 January 1913 when a new biplane design, converted from a Vickers No.6 Monoplane, on a test flight, came down in the River Thames. The Vicker's pilot, Leslie McDonald, and his mechanic, Harry English, were drowned. The publican of the Tavern (and retired waterman) Richard Salmon (1843-1915), witnessed the accident and gave evidence at the inquest in Dartford. The Coroner concluded that the accident had occurred as a result of a sudden loss of power to the engine. The incident didn't deter Richard from flying as he later experienced a joyride from the aerodrome, at age 69/70.

Captain Gilbert William Mapplebeck DSO (22) (Gibb Mapplebeck) 1892-1915. was posted to No 2 Reserve Air Squadron in August 1915 to carry out flight tests. On 24 August Mapplebeck (a recognized ace) after taking off in a Morane-Saulnier N “Bullet” climbed to 80 feet and then entered a sharp right-hand turn. The plane stalled and spun into the ground. Mapplebeck was killed. Noel Pemberton-Billing MP asked questions in Parliament and it was investigated in 1916. Billing claimed that the plane was of a type condemned by the French air force and that there was a problem with the safety belt. The verdict of the Board of Inquiry on 25 August concluded that the French had indeed in large part taken the plane out of service, and that it would have been negligent to put an inexperienced pilot in such a machine, however Mapplebeck was an ‘expert’ so it was not negligent; the crash was caused by ‘an unfortunate error of judgment on the pilot’s part’, and “that the accident was due to the machine ‘spinning’ on a heavily banked turn, the pilot not having sufficient height to regain control before hitting the earth.”

Major Ernest Frederic Unwin (35), died 22 March 1916 in a B.E.2c, 10 RS, hit a tree on a night approach and caught fire, at Joyce Green.

Capt Bert James (22) RAF, was killed at Joyce Green May 1918, within sight of the airfield as witnessed by Carroll Bunch.

2Lt Edwin John Leslie Lonnen (27) killed 16 August 1916 in Vickers FB.9 5273, 10 RS, at Joyce Green. Stalled in turn and nose dived.

Lt Harold Staples Brewster (22) (Canadian) killed 6 December 1916 in a D.H.2 A4988, 10 RS, Joyce Green, Nose dived and crashed, at Dover.

Lt Henry Richard Deighton Simpson (20), RFC (American) killed 20 December 1916 in a Vickers F.B.16A, Vickers Ltd. Crashed on test - 'excessive strain on machine', at Joyce Green.

Lt. Sydney Esmond O’Hanlon Mid. MC. (23) 63 Squadron, killed 29 January 1918. While instructing on 29 January 1918, another aircraft gone out of control, hit O'Hanlon's Sopwith Pup, and he was seriously injured. Died on 3 February.

Vickers test pilot Harold Barnwell, (39) flying solo in a Vickers F.B.26 Vampire, B1484 crashed at Joyce Green, when he attempted a spin without sufficient altitude for recovery. Pilot KWF.

== Partial list of incidents ==
Date	Rank	Name	Fate	Unit	Type	Serial	Engine	Cause	Comment
23 March 1916	Major	E. F. Unwin	killed	10 RS	BE2c	4700		aero accident (accident was actually on 31.1.1916 - card a post-dated report)	
2 August 1916	Cpl	Jackson	injured	10 RS	DH1	4629		side-slipped from turn with insufficient speed	
16 August 1916	2Lt	Leslie Edwin John Lonnen	killed	10 RS	Vickers FB5	5273		flat turn with missing engine, dived in from 200 ft	
1 November 1916	2Lt	A. Pryce-Davis	injured	10 RS	HF F.20	A1154		pilot lost consciousness in air	
6 December 1916	Lt	H. S. E. Brewster	killed	10 RS	DH2	A4988		error of judgement, nose-dived in	
23 December 1916	2lt	G. H. S. Gregeen	injured	10 RS	Vickers FB5	5659		engine failed, force landed in ploughed field	Sgt W.G. Spooner also injured
14 January 1917	Lt	R. O. C. Bush	injured	10 RS	DH2	A2559	30047/WD2190	turned and side-slipped when gliding, to avoid sheds	Capt H.H. Griffith (pilot) killed
14 January 1917	2Lt	Vicat Scott Taylor	killed	10 RS	HF F.20	A1183		pupil inexperience or instructor's error	
14 January 1917	2Lt	D. A. R. Chapman	injured	10 RS	HF F.20	A1183	27305/WD3338	pilot error or pupil inexperience	
12 February 1917	2Lt	A. G. Graves	injured	10 RS	DH2	A4991	30489/WD4179	turned on left side and crashed	
13 March 1917	Lt	J. H. Ideson	killed	10 RS	DH2	A4786	30420/WD4141	spinning nose-dive from bank at 1000 ft	
19 April 1917	2Lt	C. Hartland-Roew	injured	10 RS	HF F.20	A1218	2985/WD261	crashed after engine failure	
30 April 1917	2Lt	Newton-Jones	injured	10 RS	Vickers FB9	A8611	30066/WD2209	engine failed, fell into river	
1 May 1917	Capt	Harry Wadlow	killed	10 RS	DH2	A2602	30591/WD11664	collided with hut on landing	
7 July 1917	2Lt	Wilfred Graham Salmon	killed	63 TS	Pup	A6230	WD10895	machine gun fire from HA	
10 July 1917	Cpl	J. W. Rattray	injured	63 TS	Avro	B1397	WD11668	took off with one wing low, steep LH turn and nose-dived from 50 ft	
17 August 1917	Lt	A. G. P. Dow	killed	63 TS	Avro	B3120	Mono 6465/712/WD6678	collided in air with Avro B3143 (pilot OK), fell in river and pilot drowned	
2 November 1917	Capt	H. H. Griffith	killed	63 TS	Avro	B3234	Mono 30768/WD11841	failed to exit spin and crashed on to barge	
2 November 1917	Sgt	W. G. Spooner	injured	63 TS	Avro	B3234	Mono 30768/WD11841	failed to recover from spin and hit barge in the R Thames	
7 November 1917	2Lt	Romuald John Charles Leduc	killed	63 TS	DH5	A9206	35671/WD9320	crashed from RH turn at 1500 ft	
8 November 1917	2Lt	Wilfred George Redman	killed	63 TS	DH5	A9395	35568/WD9217	choked engine on take-off from Harling Road (collection flight?), attempted to land downwind and crashed	
11 November 1917	2Lt	L. Duffus	injured	63 TS	DH5	A9252		choked engine and crashed on landing	
18 December 1917	Cpl	J. W. Cook	injured	63 TS				propeller accident	
22 December 1917	2Lt	R. S. Coldney	injured	63 TS	Avro	B9959	Mono 30808/WD20379	stalled and crashed when turning back with failing engine	
28 January 1918	2Lt	H. B. Davies	injured	63 TS				accident while flying over Dover	
29 January 1918	Cdt	W. R. Avery	injured	63 TS	Avro	C4418	Mono 20816/WD20387	collided with Avro C4322	Lt S. E. O'Hanlon fatally IIFA
29 January 1918	Lt	Sydney Esmond O'Hanlon	fatally injured	63 TS	Avro	C4418	Mono 30816/WD20387	mid-air collision with Avro C4332	Cdt W. R. Avery injured
19 March 1918	2Lt	Charles Herbert Wheelock	killed	63 TS	Camel	C1694	1260/WD11409	spun from RH turn at c.500 ft	card says Dartford
28 March 1918	Capt	Roden Latham Chatterton	killed	63 TS	Camel	B9231	R1966/WD15095	gliding too slowly in strong wind on landing, got into slow spin	
20 April 1918	Sgt	Frank March	killed	63 TS	Avro	C4417	Mono WD4228	came out of spin and nose-dived from 50 ft	
22 April 1918	Pte	G. E. Maxwell	injured	63 TS (attached ex 159th Aero Sqn USAS)				propeller accident	
24 April 1918	Pte	E. Maxwell Glenn	injured	63 TS	Pup	B6138	WD45803	propeller accident	
7 May 1918	Capt	Bert James	Killed	63 TS	Avro	B8707	Le Rhone WD41980	mid air collision with Avro C4477 (2Lt JG Ward)	2Lt G. Nash also killed
7 May 1918	2Lt	Gordeon Nash	killed	63 TS	Avro	B8707	Le Rhone WD41980	mid-air collision at 2000 ft with Avro C4477 (2Lt JG Ward) during fighting practice	Capt B. James also killed
7 May 1918	2Lt	John Gordon Ward	killed	63 TS	Avro	C4477	Le Rhone WD10386	collided at 2000 ft with Avro B8707 while on fighting practice	
2 June 1918	2Lt	John Percival Van Ryneveld	killed	63 TS	Camel	B4632	WD38440	mid-air collision at 2000 ft with Camel C130 (2Lt F.L. Shield)	
2 June 1918	2Lt	Frank Leslie Shield	killed	63 TS	Camel	C136	WD53680	mid-air collision at 2000 ft with Camel B4632	
3 June 1918	2Lt	Norman Owen	killed	63 TS	Camel	B7424	WD15722	spun coming in to land from 2000 ft	
3 June 1918	2Lt	G. W. Cochrane	injured	63 TS	Camel	B7435		struck on aerodrome by machine piloted by 2Lt E.S. Houseley	
3 June 1918	2Lt	E. S. Houseley	injured	63 TS	Camel	B7435	5273/WD38500	error of jusdgement in diving	2Lt G. W. Cochrane injured on ground
14 June 1918	2Lt	Guy Manwaring Knocker	injured	63 TS	Avro	D8783	Clerget WD38316	swinging propeller on Ware landing ground	Capt T. E. Withington uninjured
18 June 1918	Lt	Charles Wilson O'Connell	killed	63 TS	Camel	B7414	WD38288	climbing RH turn from ground, stalled at 50 ft and spun	
27 June 1918	Cpl	Patrick Alexander Birkholy	injured	63 TS attached ex 162nd Aero Sqn USAS	Avro	D7058	Clerget 20969/WD39388	propeller accident	
2 July 1918	Flt Cdt	Harton Woodwak Barwood	killed	63 TS	Avro	D6306	Clerget WD38327	vertical nose dive from half roll at 300 ft	
4 July 1918	Pte	Paul White	injured	63 TS attached ex 162nd Aero Sqn USAS	Avro	D7053	Clerget 2100/WD15229	propeller accident	
17 July 1918	Capt	Claude Robert James Thompson	killed	63 TS	Camel	B7820	WD38568	stalled turn at 800 ft onto target, RH spin and nose-dived in	
19 July 1918	2Lt	Harry Hall Gunther	killed	63 TS	Camel	B7760	WD43810	crashed near Cobham Woods	
21 July 1918	2Lt	J. W. Fife	injured	63 TS	Camel	B7427	WD15229	crashed after cylinder blew off	
27 July 1918	Flt Cdt	Charles David Brown	killed	63 TS	Avro	6152	Clerget WD2283	collided during fighting practice	6182 (As shown on RAF aircraft casualty cards) 8
27 July 1918	Flt Cdt	Richard Eric Merry	injured	63 TS	Avro	D8833		propeller accident	
27 July 1918	Lt	George Edward Taylor	injured	63 TS	Avro	D8834	Clerget WD38382	collided at 200 ft during fighting practice with Avro 6152	
30 July 1918	2Lt	Victor Samuel Gordon Hawkins	injured	63 TS	Avro	D7113	Clerget WD7866	engine missing at 2000 ft, crashed in forced landing	
2 August 1918	Lt	Charles Henry Williams	killed	63 TS	Camel	B2435	WD30548	flat turn to avoid another machine while firing at targets, spun and nose-dived into Dartford Creek	
10 August 1918	2Lt	John Edmund Seaton	injured	63 TS	Avro	D8833		struck by propeller of the machine, which was landing	
14 August 1918	Lt	Frank George William King	injured	63 TS	Avro	D4474	Clerget WD6389	turned downwind at 100 ft to avoid village, stalled and crashed	Pte F.C. Miller also injured
14 August 1918	Pte	Frederick Charles Miller	injured	63 TS Attached ex 162nd Aero Sqn USAS	Avro	D4474	Clerget WD6389	turned downwind at c.100 ft to avoid over-flying a village, stalled and crashed	Lt F.G.W. King (pilot) also injured
29 August 1918	Flt Cdt	Phillip George Dalton Winchester	killed	63 TS	Camel	C8291	WD45923	wing broke off in mid-air	
4 September 1918	2Lt	William Riley	injured	63 TS	Avro	D2088	Clerget WD61561	failed to flatten out on landing	
4 September 1918	AM2	John Foster	injured	63 TS				propeller accident	
18 September 1918	Flt Cdt	Harry Marklands Jackson	injured	63 TS	Avro	D1996	Clerget R1335/WD11484	engine failed, stalled attempting to land	
29 September 1918	Sgt	Henry Girling Henderson	killed	63 TS	Camel	E1574	WD44578	choked engine at 80 ft on take-off, attempted to turn back, stalled and spun in	

== Legacy ==
=== North Kent Nomads Flying Club ===
One of the fields is used by this Large Radio Controlled Model Aircraft club.

=== Wells Fireworks Factory ===
In 1938 a long-established English firework maker Joseph Wells and Sons Limited acquired land between the Orchard Hospital and what was the Aerodrome. A part of the aerodrome site was included; where the RAF Officers mess had been located near the main gate. Wells had been originally established in 1837 at Earlsfield and Camberwell in London. To meet increasing demands and compliance with the requirements of the Explosives Act 1875, they had opened a new factory at Honor Oak Park in 1878, just north of the railway station.

They also opened a factory in 1915 at Colchester to supplement Honor Oaks' production. Colchester was closed in 1938 when the new factory was built at Joyce Green, Dartford. The Honor Oak factory was closed in 1947 and the construction sheds from the old factory were transported to the Joyce Green site. Wells carried on production of fireworks until the family sold the site in 1968.
