= Claude Alward Ridley =

British aviator and military officer

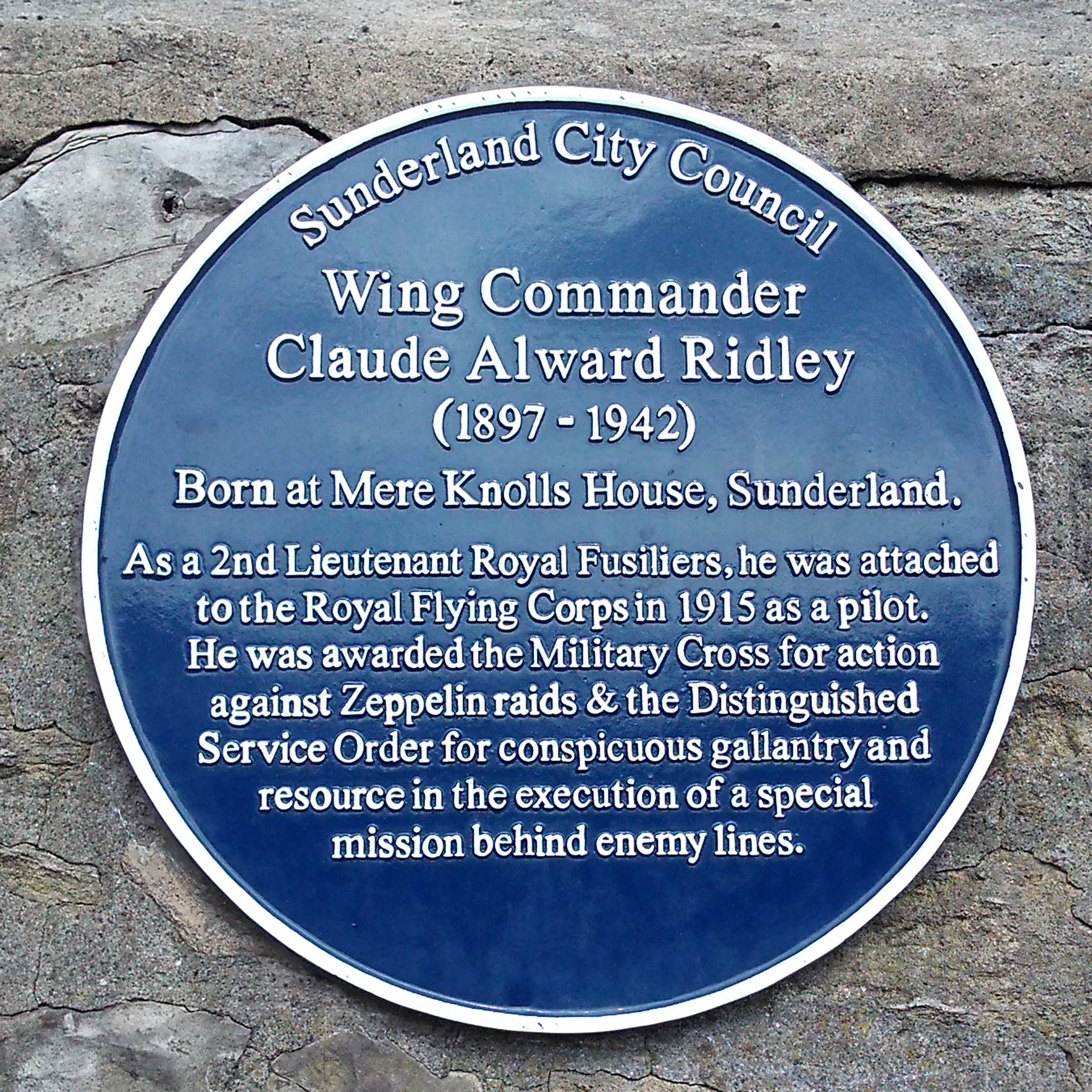
- The blue plaque in Sunderland to commemorate the life of Claude Alward Ridley
- Born: 15 November 1896; Sunderland
- Died: 27 June 1942 (aged 45); The Dorchester Hotel, London
- Burial place: St Mary and St Margarets churchyard, Stow Maries, Essex; 51.6636°N 0.6502°E
- Spouse: Lillias Elizabeth McAlpine
- Military career
- Allegiance: United Kingdom
- Branch: British Army (1914–18); Royal Air Force (1918–42)
- Service years: 1914–1928; 1939–1942
- Rank: Wing Commander
- Service number: 03036
- Commands: No. 37 Squadron RAF; No. 39 Squadron RAF; No. 61 Squadron RAF; No. 75 Squadron RAF; No. 112 Squadron RAF
- Conflicts: First World War; Second World War
- Awards: Distinguished Service Order; Military Cross

Claude Alward Ridley, DSO, MC (15 November 1897 – 27 June 1942) was a British aviator and military officer. During the First World War, he served as a fighter pilot and was decorated for home defence in southern England against German attacks from planes and Zeppelins. While a pilot with No. 60 Squadron, Ridley landed in occupied France and, despite being taken prisoner, he escaped and spent several weeks on the run before returning to England via the Netherlands.

== Early life ==
Ridley was born in Sunderland on 15 November 1897, and was the youngest of seven children. He grew up in the suburb of Fulwell in the city, but by the age of 11, the family were living in Notting Hill in London.

== First World War ==
At the start of the First World War, Ridley was offered a temporary commission into the Royal Flying Corps (RFC), but on being granted a full commission, he entered Sandhurst and passed out as an officer in the Royal Fusiliers. He did, however, keep up with his flying and was transferred into the RFC in July 1915.

After transferring from the Royal Fusiliers, Ridley was allocated to No. 3 Squadron and was wounded in action on the Western Front in 1916. His foot was injured and, as a result, he could not fly having to convalesce in England. He was awarded the Military Cross for his action in downing a Zeppelin in 1916 while flying from Joyce Green.

When No. 60 Squadron was formed in April 1916, Ridley was one of the initial pilots drafted to the squadron. While ferrying a spy into territory behind enemy lines to the French town of Douai in August 1916, the aircraft Ridley was flying broke down. As he and his passenger were trying to get the aircraft going, German military personnel heard them and detained them. They were questioned but managed to escape quite quickly.

Ridley hid whilst the spy brought him some civilian attire and then left Ridley to fend for himself. Whilst he was hiding, Ridley observed the German pilots flying their aircraft and even witnessed a British aircraft crash landing and its pilot and observer being marched off by the Germans for interrogation. Ridley managed to make his way across France and into Belgium before returning to England through the Netherlands. Whilst on his journey, he made notes and gathered intelligence about the German forces and delivered these to his superiors when he returned. He was awarded the Distinguished Service Order (DSO) and was mentioned in the London Gazette which said "For conspicuous gallantry and judgement in the execution of a special mission."

At the end of the war, an assessment of battle casualties on No. 60 Squadron determined that 115 pilots and observers had been either wounded, taken prisoner, were missing or had been killed. Ridley was the only one to escape captivity on the squadron and he is recorded as being back in Britain by the 13 October 2016, some two months after his aircraft failed on the field in France.

Due to his high-profile involvement in ferrying spies, it was decided to withdraw Ridley from active operations over the front line in case he had to land in occupied territory again and be shot as a spy. Instead he was sent to head up B-Flight from No. 37 Squadron at Stow Maries Aerodrome. At this point, Ridley was a 19-year old lieutenant in charge of a new squadron. Whilst there, he was among many who launched their fighters to defend the south and east of England against attack from Gotha bombers and Zeppelin raids. In one such event, British anti-aircraft batteries located along the Thames Estuary confused the 37 Squadron Sopwith Pups with enemy aircraft and opened fire upon them. Ridley, like many others, was hit and had his engine cowling blown off at 14,000 feet (4,300 m), and had to make an emergency landing at Rochford.

Ridley was particularly galled by this because only a day earlier, he had flown his aircraft over the batteries so that the artillery men could see the outline of his aircraft and hear the noise of his engine.

Ridley then took command of the newly formed No. 61 Squadron at Rochford in the summer of 1917, before taking command of No. 112 Squadron at Throwley in December of the same year. In the late stages of the war he commanded No. 28 Squadron at Grossa in Italy before returning to command No. 75 Squadron in England. When No. 75 Squadron was disbanded in 1919, Ridley became the commander of No. 39 Squadron.

== Later life ==
Ridley was promoted to the rank of squadron leader in January 1925 and, in June of the same year, he married Lillias Elizabeth McAlpine, the daughter of Sir Robert McAlpine; they had three children together. He left the Air Force soon after and was on the retired list by 1928, although he was recalled in 1939 on the outbreak of the Second World War. During the Second World War, he served as a Wing Commander in various appointments including Leeds University Air Squadron.

== Death ==
Ridley died in the Dorchester Hotel in Mayfair, London on 27 June 1942. His death was attributed to natural causes rather than a circumstance of the war. His wish to be buried near to Stow Maries aerodrome was granted, and like many others who had served at Stow Maries, his grave is located in the churchyard of St Mary and St Margaret's Church in the village.

== Commemorations ==
The home that Ridley lived in during his family's time in Sunderland had a blue plaque affixed to the wall in 2016. Military Cadet organisations in the area of Essex around the former Stow Maries Aerodrome, compete in the Ridley Trophy competition annually by vying for timings on an assault course.
