= Joyce Green, Kent =

Coordinates: 51°27′49″N 0°13′36″E

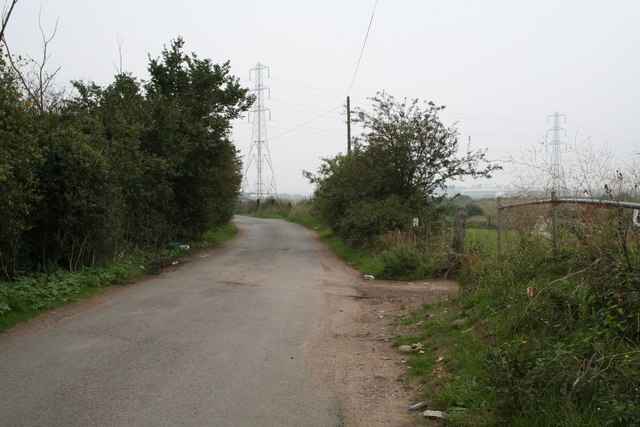
Joyce Green, Kent

Joyce Green is an area of Dartford in Kent, England. The former Joyce Green Hospital and Royal Flying Corps Station Joyce Green used to be in the area.

== History ==
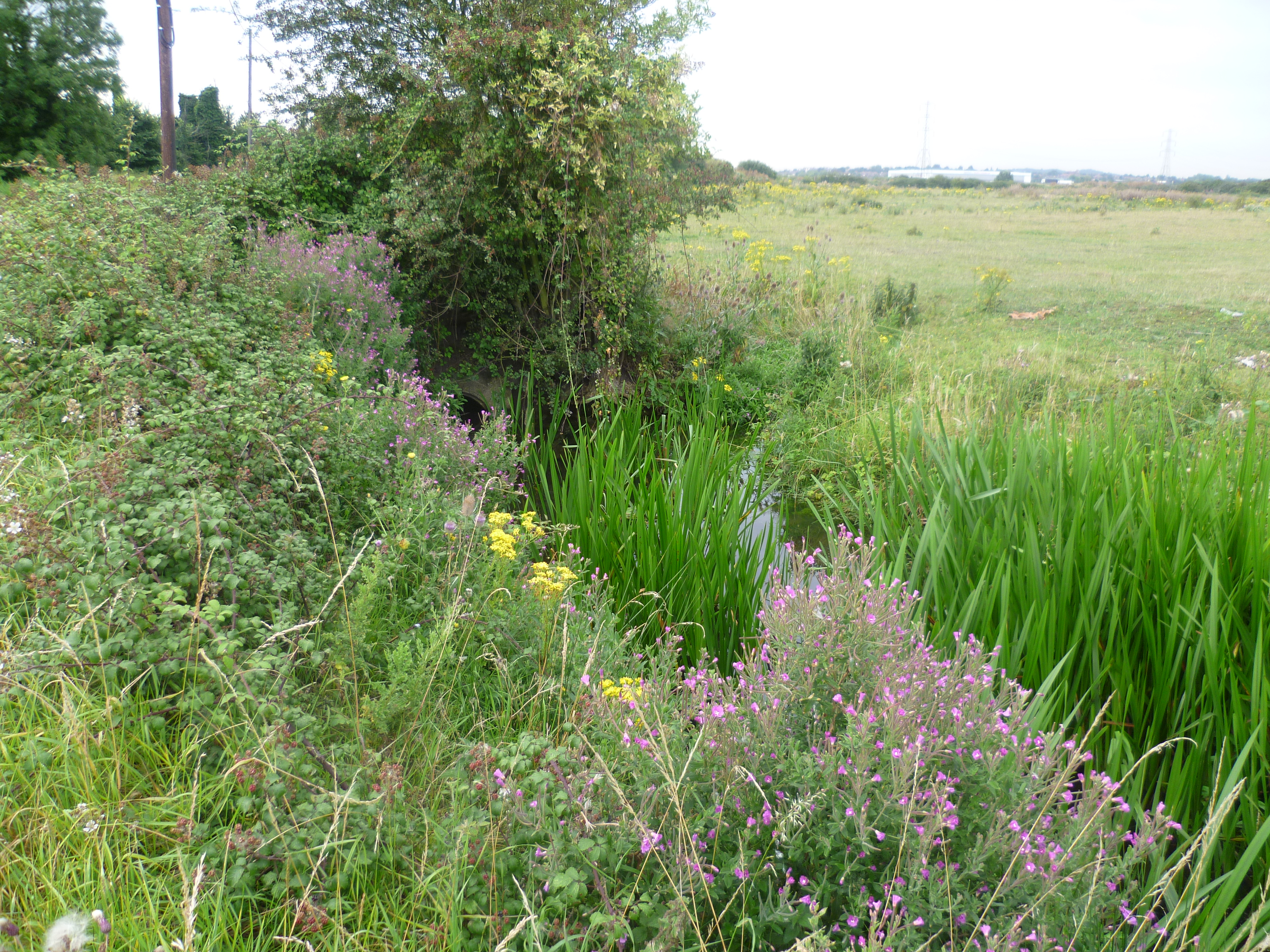
Dartford Marshes in Joyce Green

Joyce Green was heavily damaged by the 19 July 2022 wildfires.
