= Audrey Emerton, Baroness Emerton =

British nursing administrator and life peer (1935–2026)

The Right Honourable The Baroness Emerton DBE GCStJ FRCN
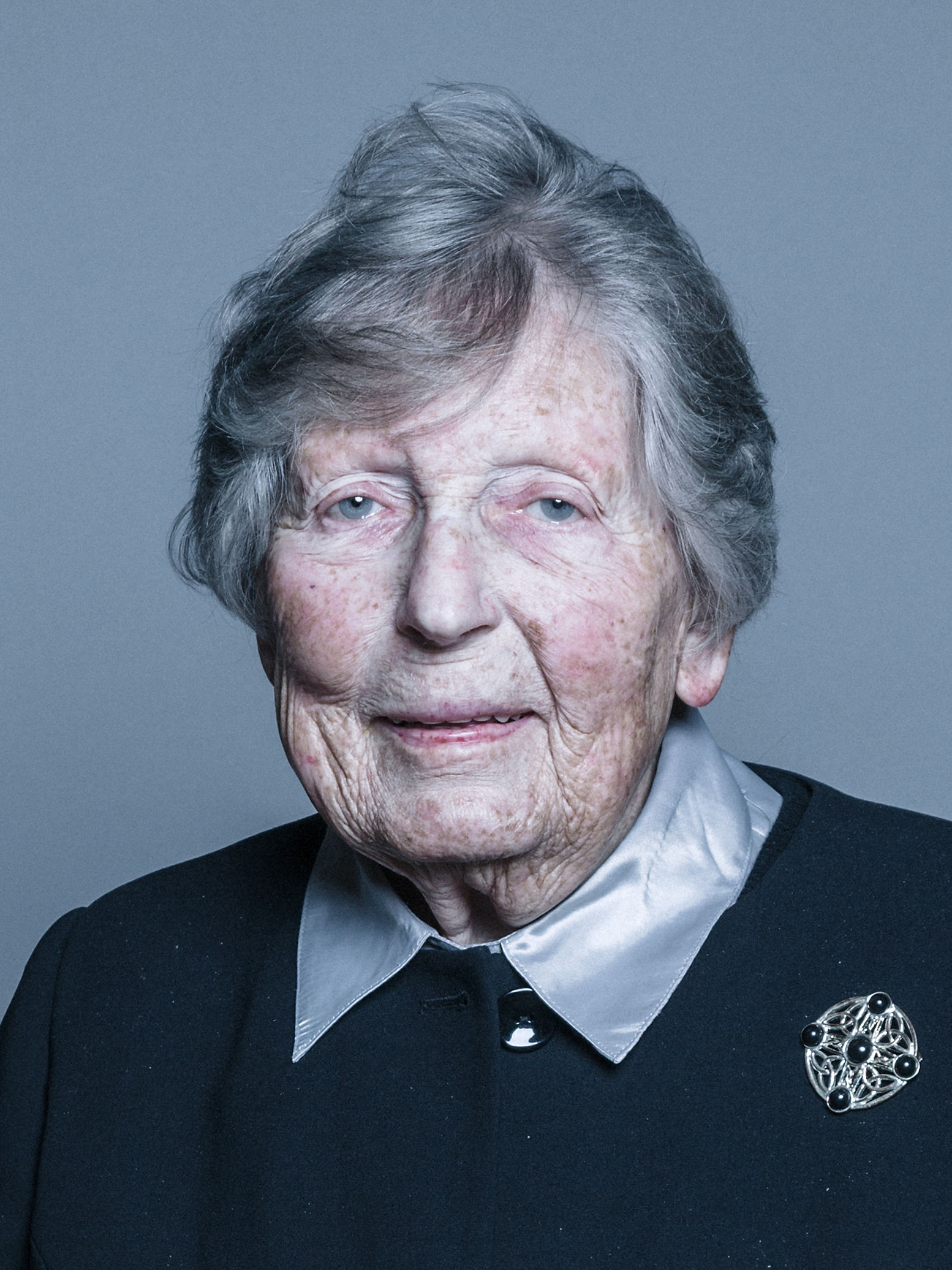
- Official Portrait of Baroness Emerton

Member of the House of Lords
- Lord Temporal
- Life peerage 17 February 1997 – 1 November 2019

Personal details
- Born: Audrey Caroline Emerton; 10 September 1935
- Died: 27 February 2026 (aged 90)
- Party: Crossbench

Audrey Caroline Emerton, Baroness Emerton (10 September 1935 – 27 February 2026) was a British nursing administrator and life peer who was a member of the House of Lords from 1997 to 2019. She sat as a crossbencher.

Appointed a Dame Commander of the Order of the British Empire in the 1989 New Year Honours, she was created a life peer as Baroness Emerton, of Tunbridge Wells in the County of Kent and of Clerkenwell in the London Borough of Islington on 17 February 1997. She sat in the House of Lords until her retirement on 1 November 2019.

== Career ==
Emerton worked in the National Health Service as Chief Nursing Officer of South East Thames Regional Health Authority throughout the 1980s, and is chiefly remembered and honoured for leading the programme that replaced Darenth Park Hospital, a huge asylum for people with learning disabilities, which closed in August 1988. She was President of the Association of Nurse Administrators 1979–1983.

She was Chair of the United Kingdom Central Council for Nursing, Midwifery and Health Visiting. She later on was on the Prime Minister's independent commission that published the Front Line Care (Report) in 2010.

== Affiliations ==
Emerton was Chancellor and Chief Commander of St John Ambulance and a volunteer with the organisation for more than 70 years. She submitted her resignation in January 2002, saying she did not wish to seek a further three years in the post when her period of office expired in June 2002.

She was elected chairman of the charity Attend (formerly known as National Association of Hospital and Community Friends) in 2003. She retired as chairman in 2006 but was named vice-president, a position she still held.

Emerton served as chairman of the Brighton Health Care NHS Trust from 1994 to 2000: the Audrey Emerton Building, an educational facility of Brighton and Sussex University Hospitals NHS Trust, is named in her honour.

== Death ==
Emerton died on 27 February 2026, at the age of 90.

== Arms ==
Coat of arms of Audrey Emerton, Baroness Emerton
Coronet A Coronet of a Baroness Escutcheon Sable a Cross conjoined to a Bordure Argent between four Ancient Lamps the spouts inwards and enflamed Or Supporters On either side a Dragon Sable gorged with a Collar attached thereto a Chain reflexed over the back and grasping in the interior forefoot a Stave terminating in an eight-pointed Maltese Cross Argent Motto PRO FIDE PRO ULTILITATE HOMINUM (For the Faith, for the service of mankind) Orders Order of the British Empire circlet (Appointed DBE 1989)

== Honours ==

Ribbon	Description	Notes
	Order of the British Empire (DBE)	Dame Commander; Civil Division; 1989 New Years Honours List
	Order of St John (GCStJ)	Dame Grand Cross; 2004
	ULS Extension of the Service Medal of the Order of St John with 4 Gold Bars	70 years of volunteer service with St John Ambulance.

- She was awarded Fellowship of the Royal College of Nursing in 2009, giving her the Post Nominal Letters "FRCN" for Life.
