= Medway Community Healthcare =

- Type: Community interest
- Budget: £63 million
- Employees: 1237 (full-time equivalent, as at 31 October 2012)

Medway Community Healthcare is a community interest company providing community health trust services to the people of Medway established under the Transforming Community Services initiative. It comprises the community services previously run by Medway Primary Care Trust.

In July 2012 the organisation stepped in to help rescue the Balfour Centre, a day centre for adults with physical and learning disabilities, in Rochester, when it was earmarked for closure by Medway Council to save money.

As a social enterprise with an annual budget of £50 million in 2012, it can use its surplus to develop services and to invest in community projects; in September 2012 it offered £30,000 in awards to support groups who help people in the local community.

It runs the Wisdom Hospice in Rochester which was awarded a grant of £200,000 from the Department of Health in April 2013 to improve the patient environment.

The organisation established a subsidiary, Gateway Assure, in 2012 to provide professional services to "private, public and third sector clients", including assurance services, business consultancy, risk management, training and executive coaching. It made losses of £518,273 during its first two years.

It won a four-year contract with a value of about £10.5 million a year to provide all NHS and council commissioned children’s community services in Medway, where it already provides adult services, in March 2018.

== See also ==
- Healthcare in Kent
