= Erith and District Hospital =

- Dartford and Gravesham NHS Trust
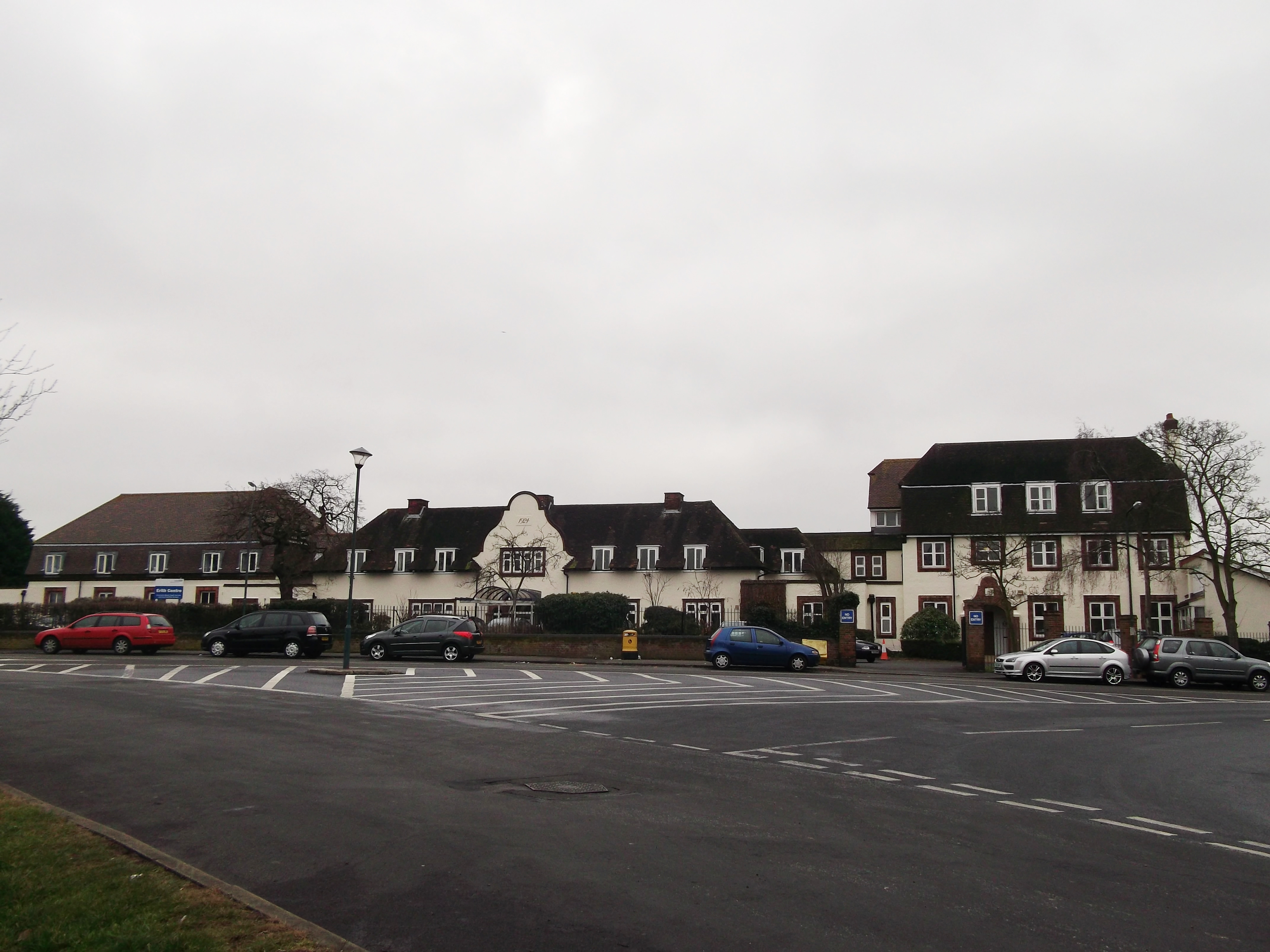
- Erith and District Hospital

- Shown in Bexley

Geography
- Location: Erith, London, England
- Coordinates: 51.4771°N 0.1667°E

Organisation
- Care system: National Health Service

Services
- Emergency department: Urgent care centre only

History
- Founded: 1871

Links
- Website: www.dgt.nhs.uk/patients-and-visitors/visiting-erith-and-district-hospital

Erith and District Hospital is a hospital in Erith in the London Borough of Bexley. Its former X-Ray Department, which is located underground, is a Grade II listed building. The Hurley Group manage the Urgent Care Centre and have done so since October 2014.

== History ==
The facility has its origins in a couple of cottages on Crayford Road which were converted for clinical use as the Erith, Crayford, Belvedere, and Abbey Wood Hospital in 1871. It moved to new facilities in Erith High Street in 1875 and to purpose-built premises in Park Crescent, which were officially opened by the Prince of Wales, in 1924. It was extended in 1933 and an underground hospital, operated as part of the Emergency Medical Service, was built in 1938 and was in use throughout the Second World War. It joined the National Health Service as Erith and District Hospital in 1948 and a new outpatient department was completed in 1954.
