= Beacon Wood Country Park =

Country park in Kent, England

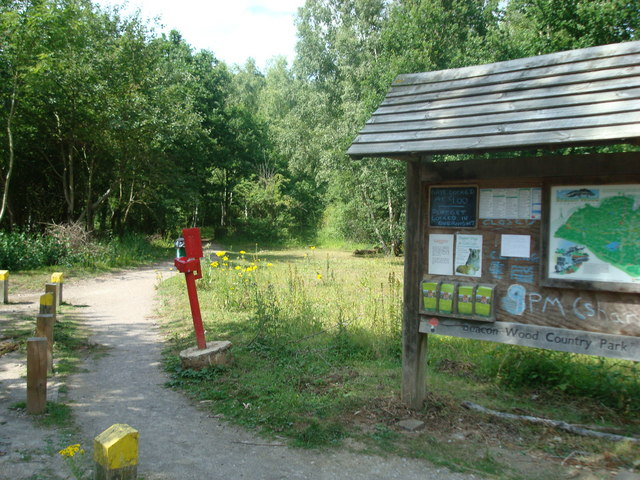
- Interactive map of Beacon Wood Country Park
- Coordinates: 51°25′24″N 0°17′20″E
- Area: 70 acres (28 ha)
- Created: 1991
- Operator: Kent County Council,
- Status: Open 7 days a week, dawn until dusk
- Website: www.dartford.gov.uk/parks/beaconwood.htm

Beacon Wood Country Park shown within Kent (grid reference TQ23596315)

Beacon Wood Country Park is a public woodland in Bean near Dartford, in Kent, England. It was previously an industrial claypit then re-claimed as woodland park open to the public, currently owned by Tarmac.

== History ==
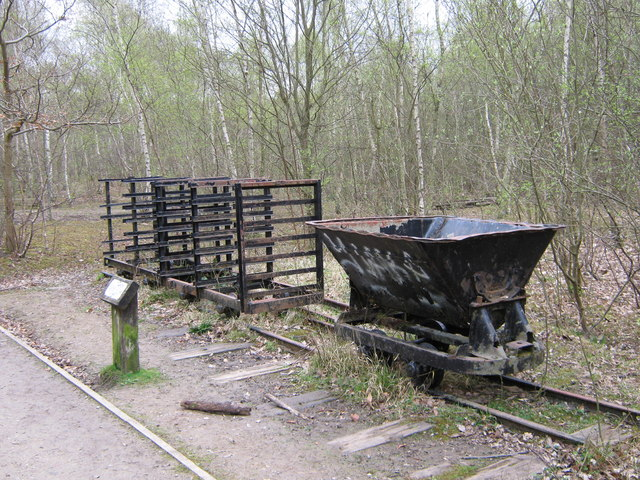
Wagon in Beacon Wood Country Park

The park has had a mixed history. For over 400 years, it was a rounded hill and ancient woodland. The trees have been used to supply timber for various uses. Including building, fencing and within ship construction. Especially the oak trees.

A beacon was placed on top of the rounded hill (approx 300 feet high) during Elizabethan times. It was one of the chain of beacons lit to warn of the approach of the Spanish Armada (circa 1580). Later, some of the ancient woods were cleared and orchards were planted in the 19th century.

In 1885, John J. Allchin leased a section of the site, for the yearly rent of £4-10 shillings to the E.C.Powder Company Limited, who began manufacturing smokeless gunpowder.

In 1900, some 27 small, predominantly Kent-based, cement manufacturers and their subsidiaries merged to form the Associated Portland Cement Manufacturers (1900) Ltd., or APCM for short, but also known locally as "The Combine". In 1928 the famous Blue Circle brand name was introduced.

In the 1930s Beacon Wood was taken over for its Clay Reserves, by APCM Ltd. From 1935 to 1964, four million tonnes of clay were excavated, mixed to a slurry and pumped along a 3 km pipeline, from the Bean Clay Pit, to Johnsons Cement Works (between Greenhithe and Stone). The clay was mixed with crushed chalk and burnt in kilns to produce cement. Although clay extraction ceased in 1964, the land remained in APCM ownership, without public access.

In 1991 Blue Circle Industries leased the 70 acres (280,000 m^{2}) disused Clay Pit for 15 years to Kent County Council, who created the Beacon Wood Country Park and an Advisory Group was set up by Groundwork UK (Kent Thames-side) who managed the creation and operation of the park.

Beacon Wood Country Park was created by Groundwork Trust and local Bean residents and then opened to the Public. Who made paths and planted trees within the site. The Official Opening was on Wednesday 10 July 1991, by Sir Derek Barber, Chairman of the then Countryside Commission (now called Natural England).

Groundwork Trust then set up a volunteer group maintaining the woodlands.

In 2001, Blue Circle Industries was taken over and the land passed to the Lafarge Group. Lafarge Cement UK, like its predecessor Blue Circle Industries, was the largest cement manufacturer in the United Kingdom, producing cement products under the old Blue Circle brand.

On 1 April 2001, Kent County Council and Dartford Borough Council took over park management from Groundwork Kent Thames-side. KCC/DBC did not continue the meetings of the Beacon Wood Advisory Group.

In 2004, Kent Thameside Green Grid Design Strategy and Guidelines was produced by Kent County Council. It proposed to extend both Beacon Wood and Darenth Country Park to create a ‘joined’ Darenth and Beacon Country Park.

In October 2005, a feasibility study and proposed action plan, for the creation of an Dartford Ancient Woodlands Country Park (DAWCP), was published. The report was funded by the ODPM and carried out by Gillespies. It proposed linking Beacon Wood Country Park, Darenth Wood (a local SSSI), Darenth Country Park, Lords Wood and Ladies Wood (two other local Gravesham woods). The DAWCP was to cater for increased use, both from large scale development in the area and from further afield. The status of the DAWCP is unclear, as the public consultation phase ended many years ago. No more mentions of the ancient woodland park can be found.

Lafarge granted Kent County Council a 10-year extension to the lease in 2006, making the lease end date 2016.

In April 2012, the country park was closed due to budget cuts within Kent County Council. There has also been a change in the lease agreement between Lafarge and the council, so the site has been returned to the ownership of LaFarge, who are looking for other owners. Nearby Bean residents were worried that this may also include property developers. However, land owners Lafarge Cement UK, entered into a five-year management partnership with Groundwork UK and Bean Parish Council.

The Friends of Beacon Woods Country Park was set up in September 2012 to promote community involvement in managing the park and to encourage local residents to use the park as well as highlight the importance of environmental education and awareness.
