= Millbrook Healthcare =

Community equipment service provider in Southampton, England

Millbrook Healthcare is a provider of community equipment services, wheelchair services, and Technology Enabled Care services. It also runs a home improvement agency and was awarded the Foundations HIA Service of the Year Award 2017.

== History ==
The firm is based in Southampton, where it was founded in 1946 as an upholstery business. It operates a fleet of 400 vans from depots across southern England. It has provided wheelchair services for Plymouth and South Hams since 2011.

It took over the contract for wheelchair provision in Hampshire in 2014. At that time there was a waiting list of around 18 months. It took over the service in Kent in April 2017. It took over the Care and Repair service from West Dorset District Council in 2015.

In August 2018 four disability groups in Kent wrote to the Clinical commissioning groups and MPs in the county to say that they “no longer had any confidence in Millbrook to provide the wheelchair service across Kent”, or in the ability of Thanet CCG to manage the contract, worth £5.1 million a year. A representative from the Kent Wheelchair Users’ Group described the service as “worse now than it’s ever been in the 56 years I’ve used it”.

== Acquisition ==
In February 2021, Millbrook has acquired Ross Care, "a major provider of wheelchair services and mobility equipment".

== See also ==
- Mogo Wheelchairs
