= Healthcare in Kent =

Healthcare in Kent has, from 1 July 2022, been mainly the responsibility of the Kent & Medway Integrated Care Board. Certain specialised services are directly commissioned by NHS England, coordinated through the South East integrated regional team. Some NHS England structures are aligned on a Kent and Medway basis, others on a South East basis and there is liaison with London to provide many tertiary (highly specialised) healthcare services.

Local authority areas covered by NHS Kent and Medway Integrated Care Board: 1) Sevenoaks 2) Dartford 3) Gravesham 4) Tonbridge and Malling 5) Medway (single tier in yellow) 6) Maidstone 7) Tunbridge Wells 8) Swale 9) Ashford 10) City of Canterbury 11) Folkestone and Hythe 12) Thanet 13) Dover

== History ==
From 1947 to 1965 NHS services in Kent were managed by the South-East Metropolitan Regional Hospital Board (RHB). In 1974 the boards were abolished and replaced by regional health authorities (RHA). The whole of Kent came under the South East Metropolitan RHA. Regions were reorganised in 1996 and Kent came under the South Thames Regional Health Authority. Kent had an area health authority (AHA) from 1974 until 1982 when it was divided into five district health authorities (DHA): Canterbury and Thanet; Dartford and Gravesham; Maidstone; Medway; South East Kent; and Tunbridge Wells. In 1993 these were amalgamated into two - West Kent and East Kent. Regional health authorities were reorganised and renamed strategic health authorities (SHA) in 2002. Kent was under Kent and Medway SHA. In 2006 regions were again reorganised and Kent came under NHS South East Coast until that was abolished in 2013. There were three primary care trusts (PCTs) for the area: NHS Eastern and Coastal Kent; NHS West Kent; NHS Medway up until April 2013. After this eight clinical commissioning groups (CCGs) were established, being Canterbury and Coastal; Dartford Gravesham and Swanley; Medway; South Kent Coast; Swale; Thanet; West Kent; and Ashford. These were given conditional approval to amalgamate in October 2019 and this progressed with formal approval on 20 March 2020 to the formation of the Kent & Medway Clinical Commissioning Group (CCG) on 1 April 2020. This contributed to the Kent & Medway Integrated Care System (ICS) until the creation on 1 July 2022 of the Integrated Care Board (ICB) by the Health and Care Act 2022.

== Sustainability and transformation plans ==
Kent (and Medway) formed a sustainability and transformation plan area in March 2016 with Glenn Douglas, the Chief Executive of Maidstone and Tunbridge Wells NHS Trust as its leader. He was appointed accountable officer for all six CCGs in March 2018, having left the Trust. The subsequent establishment of a Kent & Medway Clinical Commissioning Group in 2020 evolved from this structure.

In February 2018 it was reported that the Encompass project in Whitstable, Faversham & Canterbury had seen a 7.3% reduction in the emergency admissions rate in the area between 2014–15 and the 12 months to September 2017.

A health and social care shared record system, the Kent and Medway Care Record, was launched in the county in December 2020. It includes data feeds from the four acute hospital trusts, three community services providers, two community-based mental health services providers, 225 main GP practices and 85 branch sites, and around 466 social care teams based in local authorities. Patients are able to access their own records.

== Commissioning issues ==
Community services are provided by Kent Community Health NHS Foundation Trust and Medway Community Healthcare. Community services in north Kent were transferred to Virgin Care by Swale CCG and Dartford, Gravesham and Swanley CCG in January 2016 in a contract for £18 million a year for the next seven years from April 2016 with an option to extend by a further three years. Kent Community Health NHS Foundation Trust started proceedings for a judicial review of the decision in February 2016. They claimed that Virgin could not deliver the contract.

West Kent Clinical Commissioning Group cancelled all 1,700 non-emergency operations due before April in February 2017 to save £3.2 million by delaying them until the new financial year.

It appeared in February 2018 that all the eight CCGs in Kent and Medway were contemplating a merger. Financial issues in three of the four East Kent CCGs and all four being placed in special measures resulted in August 2018 of an amalgamation of management functions (some other commissioning functions had been long aligned)

The clinical commissioning groups in Kent were asked in September 2018 to find an extra £2 million a year for the wheelchair service, operated by Millbrook Healthcare, which has a contract worth £6.2 million a year because of the increasing complexity of cases.

== Primary and community care ==
There were 262 GP practices in the county in 2017 but a process of consolidation and reorganisation is current. Out-of-hours services are provided by IC24. In East Kent they were taken over by Primecare in early 2017. The contract envisaged integrating NHS 111 and GP out-of-hours services. Primecare was placed in special measures in August 2017 by the Care Quality Commission after it was rated inadequate – only seven months after it started full operations. It is to hand back the 3-year contract in July 2018.

Whitstable is one of the areas selected to pilot Multispecialty community providers, under the Five Year Forward View. Whitstable Medical Practice, with 53,000 patients, is one of the largest in England and is proposing to build a new community hospital and a "teaching nursing home". The practice already has an ambulance response base, a minor injury clinic, a fracture clinic and a community pharmacy. It employs 25 consultants, and the local acute trust also rents space for outpatients. The multispecialty community provider is to develop into a super-practice of 17 practices and 125 GPs, with a population of 160,000 patients.

Palliative care is provided by Demelza Hospice Care for Children and for adults in East Kent by the Pilgrims Hospices in Ashford, Canterbury and Margate, founded by Ann Robertson (nurse), and elsewhere in Kent by the Heart of Kent Hospice, Hospice In The Weald, Ellenor Hospice and Wisdom hospice.

Virgin Care secured a seven-year £126 million contract to run services in community hospitals in Dartford, Gravesham, Swanley and Swale in January 2016. From December 2021, after a take over, it was renamed HCRG Care Group. These services were formerly provided by Kent Community Health NHS Foundation Trust. The wheelchair service was transferred to Millbrook Healthcare in April 2017.

Dermatology services in North and East Kent are provided by DMC Healthcare. The contract in north Kent was suspended in June 2020 because of concerns about long waiting times for treatment.

The practice at Sheppey Community Hospital was run by DMC Healthcare from 2009 on an alternative provider medical services contract which was terminated in 2021. The company's contract to run practices in Chatham was terminated in 2020.

== Acute care ==
The main providers of NHS acute hospital care in the county are East Kent Hospitals University NHS Foundation Trust, Medway NHS Foundation Trust, Maidstone and Tunbridge Wells NHS Trust and Dartford and Gravesham NHS Trust. In September 2015 the South Kent Coast Clinical Commissioning Group set up a contract with the Centre Hospitalier de Calais for patients to travel to France for general surgery, gynaecology, cataract surgery, pain management and orthopaedics. The French hospital had been arranging English classes for nurses. Patients would have to meet their own travel costs.

Inpatient specialist vascular services in the county were centralised to the Kent & Canterbury Hospital, as neither Medway nor East Kent had sufficient staff, activity or facilities on their own for safe services. There are plans to consolidate the six existing stroke centres offering immediate stroke care to three, and to establish a thrombectomy centre, as at present patients have to be taken by air ambulance to St George’s Hospital, which takes an average of two hours from the decision to transfer. Campaigners against the plan lost their judicial review in February 2020.

Patient transport services in the county are provided by G4S at a cost of £15 million a year. In 2018, they were unable to meet the specified targets because although 14% fewer car journeys than expected were required, 4% more ambulance journeys were required and 9% more patients needed an escort.

== Mental health ==
NHS Mental Health services are provided by Oxleas NHS Foundation Trust and Kent and Medway NHS and Social Care Partnership Trust. Services for children and adolescents are provided by North East London NHS Foundation Trust, who took over from Sussex Partnership NHS Foundation Trust in 2017. 76 children and young people out of 793 who had waited longer than the 18 week target time for treatment were put at risk by long delays in 2018/9. The trust did not expect to meet the 18 week target until October 2020.

In December the CCGs, the NHS Trusts, the police and the local councils signed up to the Kent and Medway Mental Health Crisis Concordat whereby they all agreed to: *make early interventions to prevent people reaching crisis point.

- ensure a multi-agency response for people in crisis so needs are met appropriately in a healthcare setting.
- provide a plan that supports the recovery and prevents reoccurrence for those for people who have experienced a crisis.

== HealthWatch ==
Healthwatch Kent is an organisation set up under the Health and Social Care Act 2012 to act as a voice for patients.

== See also ==
- Category:Health in Kent
- Healthcare in the United Kingdom
