= Joyce Green Hospital =

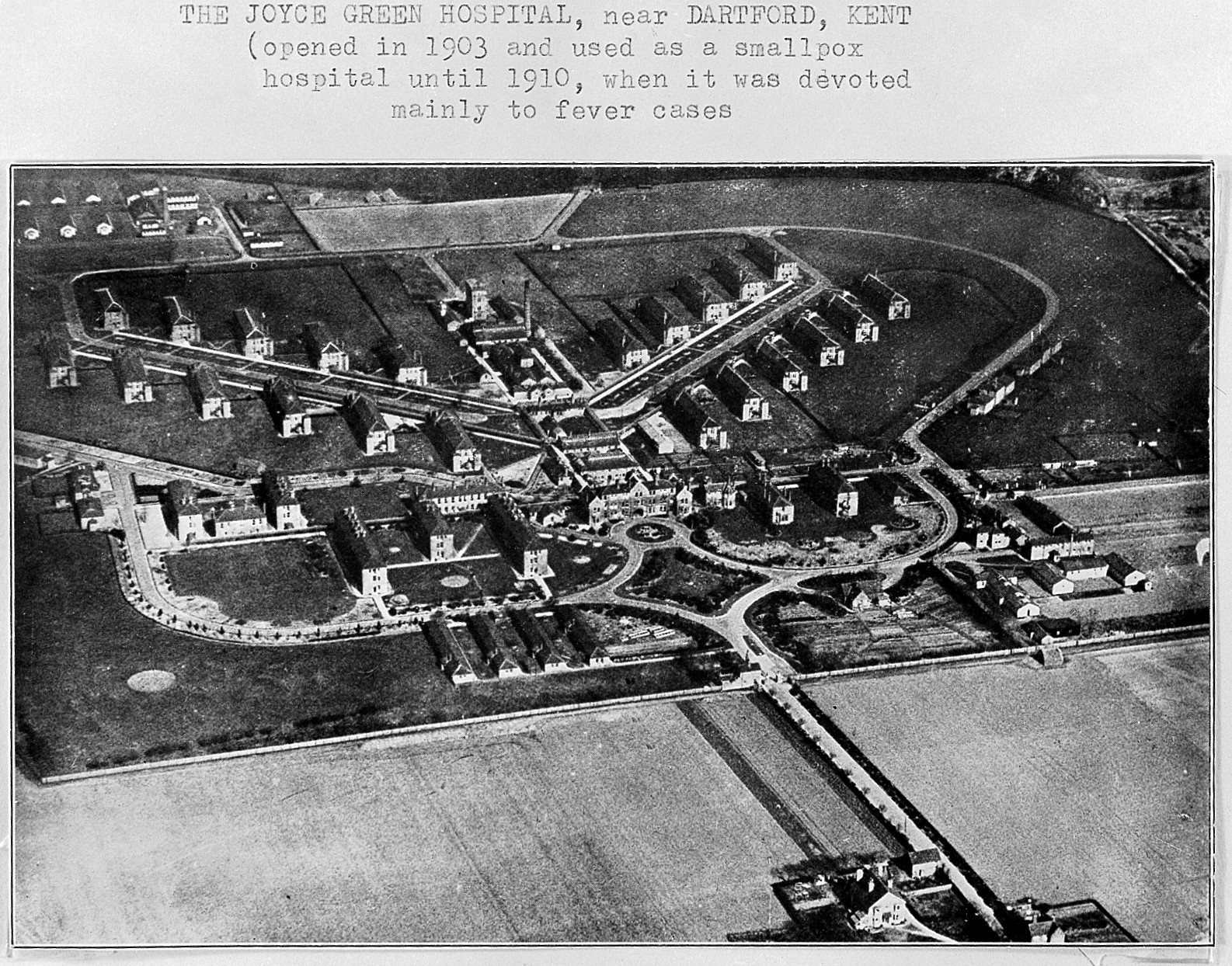

- Location within Kent

Geography
- Location: Dartford, Kent, England, United Kingdom
- Coordinates: 51°27′49″N 0°13′36″E

Organisation
- Type: Isolation, later training

Services
- Beds: 1,902 at maximum extent

History
- Founded: December 1903
- Closed: September 2000

Joyce Green Hospital was a hospital near Dartford, Kent, England. It opened in December 1903 as an isolation hospital. In later years it was a training hospital. The hospital was closed in September 2000 and the buildings were demolished. The greenspace where the hospital used to stand is known as Joyce Green.

== Background ==
The hospital was planned in the late 19th century to accommodate sufferers of smallpox, which had reached epidemic levels in London. It replaced three hospital ships based nearby in Long Reach, Gravesend 15 miles downriver from London Bridge on the Thames.^{[Note 1]} The ships, Atlas, Endymion and the Castalia, were made fast in 1883 at their new custom built moorings, they were in-line, connected by bridges 150 yards from the riverbank. The ships had become unsuitable for their role due to increasing maintenance costs, the risk of collision from passing ships and the increasing demand for beds for smallpox patients.

== History ==
Designed by the Metropolitan Asylums Board architects A & C Harston, the hospital was built on the former Joyce Green estate, whose area totalled 218 acres (88 ha). Planning for the building of the hospital began in 1893. The building of the hospital was delayed due to disagreements with the Local Government Board over the proposed size. A 4 ft (1,219 mm)-gauge tramway connected the pier with the main hospital. It was built in 1893, ahead of the construction of the main buildings. Dick, Kerr & Co. were responsible for some of the work. Horse-drawn trams were used. Initially, second-hand trams were used, converted to 4 ft gauge. As the trams were unsuitable for the hospital, they were replaced in 1908 by a fleet of at least five purpose-built ambulance trams. At its maximum, the tramway extended to 3.6 miles (5.8 km). A severe outbreak of smallpox in late 1901 increased the demand for beds. A temporary set of buildings was erected near the River Thames, where a pier would be erected to enable patients to be brought in by boat. This first set of buildings was known as the Long Reach and opened on 27 February 1902. Another set of temporary buildings was erected to the north-west of the main hospital. Known as The Orchard, they opened later in the spring of 1902, providing 664 beds.

The Joyce Green Hospital opened in December 1903 with a capacity of 986 beds. From 1907, the Long Reach and Orchard sites housed smallpox patients. The main hospital housing diphtheria and scarlet fever cases, and later also catering for measles and whooping cough patients too. The threat of smallpox had subsided by 1910. During World War I, The Orchard was used as a military hospital, mainly catering for Australian troops. In July 1914, a motor vehicle was trialled for the haulage of the tramcars. Although successful, none could be spared and the idea was dropped.

In June 1918, the hospital housed 1,140 Russian refugees who had been in contact with smallpox. A Talbot ambulance was used to haul two trams at a time in 1924–25. Electric lighting was installed at the hospital in 1926. The Long Reach was maintained in a condition of instant readiness, with a skeleton staff at all times. The original buildings were replaced in 1928–29 by permanent facilities providing 252 beds. In 1930, the hospital came under the control of the London County Council. An outbreak of smallpox saw the Long Reach buildings brought into use between 1931 and 1934. The tramway was in use until 1936 and the rails were lifted in 1943.

With the outbreak of the Second World War, the Emergency Medical Scheme was established. Joyce Green Hospital became a general hospital. Between 1944 and 1946, part of the site became a Dutch military hospital. The buildings that formed the Orchard were mostly destroyed by fire during the war. Those that survived were converted to agricultural use.

In 1948, the hospital became a National Health Service hospital. On 31 January 1953, the Long Reach site was nearly flooded due to a storm surge. In the 1950s, the hospital became used as a training ground for fever nurses, due to the existing facilities for treating infectious diseases. The Long Reach site treated its final patients in 1973, and the buildings were demolished two years later to facilitate the construction of a new flood barrier.

After services had been transferred to Darent Valley Hospital, the hospital closed and was demolished between September and December 2000. Joyce Green remains as heathland.

== Popular culture ==
Prior to its closing, the hospital was used for the music video of Northern Irish pop band, The Divine Comedy's 1999 top ten hit, "National Express" where it was portrayed as a psychiatric hospital.

== See also ==
- Healthcare in Kent
