= Darent Valley Hospital =

- Dartford and Gravesham NHS Trust
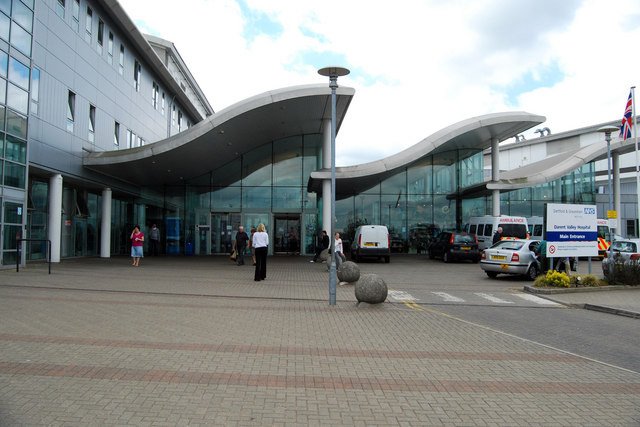
- Darent Valley Hospital

Geography
- Location: Dartford, Kent, England
- Coordinates: 51.4350°N 0.2584°E

Organisation
- Care system: National Health Service
- Type: General
- Affiliated university: Kent and Medway Medical School; King's College London GKT School of Medical Education

Services
- Emergency department: Yes
- Beds: 463

Helipads
- Helipad: Yes

History
- Opened: 14 December 2000

Links
- Website: www.dgt.nhs.uk/visiting

Darent Valley Hospital is a district general hospital in Dartford, Kent, England. It is managed by Dartford and Gravesham NHS Trust.

== History ==
The hospital, which was built to replace Joyce Green Hospital, stands on the site of the former Darenth Park Hospital, founded by the Metropolitan Asylums Board as "Darenth School" in 1878. The Regional Health Board agreed to close Darenth in 1973, but the last patients did not leave until 1988. The vast Victorian complex was then demolished.

The new buildings were procured under a Private Finance Initiative contract in 1997, the first hospital project to use this form of procurement. They were designed by Nightingale Paulley Associates and built by Carillion at a cost of £94 million. The new hospital, which replaced the services previously provided at West Hill Hospital, Dartford and Joyce Green Hospital, Dartford, was officially opened by Alan Milburn, Secretary of State for Health, on 14 December 2000.

A new on-site heart centre was opened on 2 January 2007.

On 29 September 2024 a new acute stroke unit (ASU) and hyper-acute stroke unit (HASU) opened at the hospital, as part of a reconfiguration of stroke services in Kent. Since 2 December 2024, the service also serves the London Borough of Bexley, with all patients with a suspected stroke now taken to Darent Valley for treatment rather than Princess Royal University Hospital.

== Services ==
A small number of services at the hospital are provided by other trusts:

- Ear, nose and throat (ENT) is provided by Medway NHS Foundation Trust
- Plastic surgery and oral and maxillofacial surgery are provided by Queen Victoria Hospital NHS Foundation Trust

== Facilities ==
In the main foyer of the hospital there are Costa Coffee, M&S Food and WHSmith outlets and a charity shop run by the local hospice.

== Public transport ==
The hospital is served by London Buses routes 96 and 428, which run between the nearby Bluewater Shopping Centre, the hospital, Dartford station and Woolwich and Erith respectively. Fastrack routes B and N and Brookline Coaches route 479 also serve the hospital.
