= Dartford and Gravesham NHS Trust =

NHS hospital trust

- Type: NHS trust
- Established: 1 November 1993
- Headquarters: Dartford, Kent, England
- Hospitals: Darent Valley Hospital; Erith and District Hospital; Gravesham Community Hospital
- Chair: Jackie Craissati
- Chief executive: Jonathan Wade
- Staff: 4,422 WTE (2024/25)
- Website: www.dgt.nhs.uk

Dartford and Gravesham NHS Trust is an NHS trust which runs Darent Valley Hospital in Dartford and provides some services at Erith and District Hospital, Gravesham Community Hospital in Gravesend and Queen Mary's Hospital in Sidcup.

== History ==
The trust was established on 1 November 1993 and became operational on 1 April 1994. A proposed merger with Medway NHS Foundation Trust was called off in September 2013.

== Performance ==
It was named by the Health Service Journal as one of the top hundred NHS trusts to work for in 2015. At that time it had 2593 full-time equivalent staff and a sickness absence rate of 3.68%. 78% of staff recommend it as a place for treatment and 76% recommended it as a place to work.

Darent Valley Hospital had the highest rate and number of MRSA cases for NHS trusts in England in 2015. There were 14 cases of patients being infected between 1 April 2015 and 29 February 2016.

In 2018 it forecast a deficit, for the fourth year in a row. It expected to make a loss of deficit of £20.4 million in 2018/9.

It signed a five-year contract with Medirest in 2021 for catering, cleaning and security services, with 300 staff members transferring to the group. The company provides a robot used for the cleaning of the main corridors. There have been complaints that the contractor has cut supplies down "to the absolute basics" so it is difficult to get hand towels to fill the dispensers, bags to fill the bins or soap to fill the dispensers. The company denies this. It also says it has introduced free meals for all employees at Darent Valley who are able to access packed lunches.

== See also ==
- Healthcare in Kent
