= Kent Community Health NHS Foundation Trust =

NHS community NHS trust

Kent Community Health NHS Foundation Trust is an NHS provider of community services in Kent, East Sussex and Newham. It was awarded Foundation Trust status in March 2015.

The organisation, which has about 5,500 staff, was formed on 1 April 2011 by a merger of Eastern and Coastal Kent Community Services NHS Trust and West Kent Community Health, as part of the Transforming Community Services programme.

It was named by the Health Service Journal as one of the top hundred NHS trusts to work for in 2015. At that time it had 4467 full-time equivalent staff and a sickness absence rate of 4.2%. 69% of staff recommend it as a place for treatment and 54% recommended it as a place to work.

Virgin Care secured a seven-year £126 million contract to run services in community hospitals in Dartford, Gravesham, Swanley and Swale in January 2016 formerly provided by the trust.

It was rated "outstanding" by the Care Quality Commission in July 2019.

== See also ==
- Healthcare in Kent
- List of NHS trusts
