= Helen Mair =

English physician and author (1924–2016)

Helen Elizabeth Mair OBE FFCM FRCPsych FRCP
- Born: 18 April 1924; Rotherham, England
- Died: 14 March 2016 (aged 91); Benderloch, Scotland
- Education: University of Manchester
- Relatives: Derek Senior (spouse)
- Medical career
- Field: community health
- Institutions: Medway Health Authority

Helen Elizabeth Mair (18 April 1924 – 14 March 2016) was an English physician and medical author. She was Director of Public Health at Medway Health Authority.

== Biography ==
Mair was born in Rotherham, England on 18 April 1924 to James Alexander Mair, a director of education, and his wife Helen Sumner Mair, a headmistress and educational adviser to the Girl Guides. She attended Dr Williams' School in Dolgellau, Wales and studied medicine at the University of Manchester qualifying in 1948.

After graduation she worked in positions at Ancoats Hospital, Manchester and the Royal Manchester Children's Hospital. She was an assistant health officer for Manchester City Council from 1950-1956, and later Deputy Medical Officer of Health for Dagenham. From 1961 to 1963 she was Deputy Medical Officer of Health for Gillingham, going on to become Medical Officer.

From 1974 to 1982 she was a district community physician for the Medway Health District in Kent, going on to become District Medical Officer.

She wrote and contributed to several reports on children's day nurseries, children with Down syndrome, and mental health services including The mental health service after unification: mental health in a unified National Health Service – report of the Tripartite Committee (London, Tripartite Committee, 1972), ) and Handbook of psychiatric rehabilitation practice (Oxford, Oxford University Press, 1981).

In 1959 she married Derek Senior, a freelance writer and journalist, who was a member of the Royal Commission on Local Government in England. Together they had a daughter, Jill.

She died at her home in Benderloch, Scotland, on 14 March 2016, after a short illness.

== Awards ==
In 1982 Mair received an OBE in the New Year Honours. She was a Fellow of the Faculty of Community Health, the Royal College of Psychiatrists and the Royal College of Physicians.
