= Elizabeth Senior =

British art historian (1910–1941)

- Born: 29 June 1910; Dore, South Yorkshire
- Died: 11 May 1941 (aged 30); London
- Occupations: Assistant Keeper, Prints and Drawings, British Museum
- Children: Sally Maud Senior
- Parent(s): Sally Gertrude Ashworth; Oliver Senior
- Relatives: Derek Senior; Margaret Leonie "Peggy" Senior

Academic background
- Education: Newnham College, University of Cambridge, Courtauld Institute of Art

Academic work
- Discipline: Art History
- Sub-discipline: Medieval Art

Elizabeth Senior (29 June 1910 – 11 May 1941) was an art historian and Assistant Keeper in the Department of Prints and Drawings at the British Museum. She was also a book editor for Penguin Books.

== Early life ==
Elizabeth Senior was born on 29 June 1910 in the village of Dore in Derbyshire (the village is now in South Yorkshire) to Sally Gertrude (née Ashworth, 1876–1963) and Oliver Senior (1880–1943). She had two siblings, Derek and Margaret Leonie "Peggy" (1916–2006). Her father was the author of How to Draw Hands, which was published by Studio in 1944.

Elizabeth Senior was educated at Newnham College, Cambridge; Munich and the Courtauld Institute of Art, London. Her main field of study was in medieval art.

== Career ==
In the early 1930s she spent a year studying art history in Munich.

In 1934 Senior was chosen over Alec Clifton-Taylor for the role of Assistant Keeper in the Department of Prints and Drawings at the British Museum. In doing so she became the first female antiquities curator at the museum and also the first qualified professional in her department as all of the others had classics or history degrees.

As the threat of war grew closer Senior helped secure safe passage for those fleeing Nazi Germany and became a friend to a number of eminent Jewish emigre art historians including Ernst Gombrich, Yvonne Hackenbroch, Edith Hoffman, Ernest Kitzinger (who she had met in Munich) and Fritz Saxl-Kitzinger. She used her contacts to help them find homes, jobs and publishing opportunities. Senior also travelled to Germany, where, claiming to be "an official representative of His Majesty's Government", she urged Ernst Kitzinger's parents leave the country. She then conveyed them to her mother's house in England from where they were later able to emigrate to Palestine. Senior's professional relationship with Gombrich, Ernst Kris and Ernst Kitzinger was further cemented when she worked in her spare time as editor of the King Penguin series of books from 1939 to 1941 (K 1-K 5). She also co-authored with Kitzinger the book Portraits of Christ from the same series.

At the outbreak of the Second World War she was seconded from the British Museum to work for the Treasury.

Senior was killed in a German air raid while at home in her flat at 17b Canonbury Square in London in the early hours of 11 May 1941. This was the same air raid that badly damaged the British Museum. She was cremated on 17 May at Streatham Park Crematorium.

== Personal life ==
Senior had a six-year affair with the married Thomas Kendrick, who was 14 years her senior. When she became pregnant, she decided in spite of the scandal and the fact that Kendrick did not want to keep the child, she would keep it, as she had always wanted a child. In 1941 she gave birth to a daughter, Sally Maud Senior who was born in her grandmother's house in East Dean in Sussex. The birth was registered in the first quarter of that year. Senior's early death during the Blitz came around ten weeks after Sally Maud was born. Sally Maud was found alive, placed for safety under a table, amongst the wreckage of their home by an ARP warden. Senior's sister who was also in the house at the time survived the air raid.

Sally was raised by her grandmother and aunt in East Dean. It was only once she had children of her own that Sally Senior found out that her mother's old friend "Uncle Tom", who had written letters to her throughout her childhood was her father.

== Legacy ==
Photographs attributed to Senior appear in the Conway Library at the Courtauld Institute of Art, London.

A number of tributes have been made to Senior. Ernst Gombrich, in the preface to his work The Story of Art, makes this comment:

This book would never have been written without the warm-hearted encouragement it received from Elizabeth Senior whose untimely death in an air raid on London was such a loss to all who knew her.

In similar vein, Thomas Kendrick, who was to become Director of the British Museum in 1950, included this comment in the preface to his book Late Saxon and Viking Art,

...I acknowledge an irredeemable debt to my colleague Elizabeth Senior, who was killed in 1941, for she gave me invaluable assistance with her camera and her sketch-book, and I know well that her sensible suggestions and courageous opinions have brightened and improved almost every chapter I have written. Flet tamen admonitu motus, Elissa, tui. [The Latin phrase suggesting a more personal memory of her.]

A more recent article by Helen Southworth sets out "to piece together the life story of a remarkable young woman".

== Publications ==
=== Books ===
- A Commemorative Catalogue of the Exhibition of British Art (1934).
- Portraits of Christ (1941).
- St Manchan's Shrine (1937).

==== Book reviews ====
The following books were reviewed by Senior:

- Painting in the Netherlands: Fifteenth and Sixteenth Centuries by E. G. Troche, Burlington Magazine 70:411, 1937 pp. 307–8.
- Drawings made by Fragonard in Italy, British Museum Quarterly, 11:1, 1936, pp. 5–9.

==== As editor ====
Senior was editor of the following books:

- A Book of Roses by John Ramsbottom, 1939.
- A Book of Ships by Charles Mitchell, 1941.
- British Birds on Lake, River and Stream by Phyllis Barclay Smith, 1939.
- Caricature by E. H. Gombrich and E. Kris.
