= Derek Senior =

Derek Senior (4 May 1912 – 6 December 1988) was a British expert on planning principally known for being a member of the Royal Commission on Local Government in England, chaired by Lord Redcliffe-Maud.

== Early life and career ==
Senior was born 4 May 1912 to Sally Gertrude (nee Ashworth, 1876-1963) and Oliver Senior (1880–1943). He had two siblings, Elizabeth (1910-1941) and Margaret Leonie “Peggy” (1916-2006). His father was the author of How to Draw Hands, which was published by Studio in 1944.

He attended six elementary schools before going to Manchester Grammar School; he then attended Balliol College, Oxford. In 1937 he joined the editorial staff of the Manchester Guardian. After working as a leader writer, reporter and bridge correspondent, he began to specialise in planning matters, where he built up a reputation as a distinguished specialist journalist. Senior studied the disputes between Manchester City Council and the Cheshire authorities over overspill housing closely.

In 1956, commissioned by Cambridgeshire County Planning Department, he wrote "A Guide to the Cambridge Plan" which explained the detailed planning document in non-technical language. That year he was made an Honorary Associate Member of the Royal Town Planning Institute.

== Royal Commission ==
In 1960, Senior left the staff of The Guardian (as it had then become) and became a freelance. He also worked for the Civic Trust. At the national conference of the Town and Country Planning Association in December 1964, he spoke in favour of the "City Region" as being the only way to make regional planning effective. The next year, he expanded on this theme in a high-profile article in The Political Quarterly, followed by a book of conference papers called "The Regional City".

Senior was named as a member of the Royal Commission on Local Government in England in May 1966. The proceedings of the Royal Commission were kept confidential, but when it was published on 11 June 1969, the Report was found to include a memorandum of dissent by Senior as long as the main report itself.

== Memorandum of dissent ==
The main basis of Senior's dissent was his belief in retaining two tiers of local government. He proposed to create 35 city regions as the upper tier, with 148 directly elected district councils below them. He also advocated indirectly elected regional councils. Observers noted that the boundaries proposed by Senior paid little regard to those existing.

However, Senior's dissent had little impact on the public debate about the report. Senior's appearances at many conferences failed to generate support. In his history of the reform of local government, Bruce Wood comments that "Senior's package was too complex to be readily communicable .. and too radical to be readily acceptable".

== Later life ==
After his duties on the Royal Commission ended, Senior returned to the field of planning. An essay he contributed to "London Under Stress" in 1970 called for more families to be resettled outside London to improve life inside; he wanted this move planned by an authority covering an area larger than the Greater London Council. In 1975 he was invited by the Herefordshire Survival Campaign to investigate local government arrangements in Hereford and Worcester, his alternative to be put to a referendum to oppose the merger of the two counties which had recently taken place. He served as a member of Basildon Development Corporation between 1975 and 1979.

Senior continued to support regional government, speaking in favour at a meeting of Labour members of the Association of District Councils in June 1976, and arguing that October that devolution to Scotland risked being defeated by an English backlash unless there was a firm commitment to devolution to the English regions. In 1980 he opposed the choice of Stansted for London's third airport over Maplin, pointing to the loss of agricultural land and the greater investment in housing, roads and infrastructure needed.

== Personal life ==
In 1942 he married Edith Frances Bentley and together they had two daughters and one son. In 1959 he married Dr Helen Mair, Director of Public Health for Medway Health Authority, and together they had one daughter.

== Archive ==
In 1991 Mair deposited Senior's working papers with the London School of Economics. The included in the archive were papers relating to the Redcliffe-Maud Royal Commission on Local Government in England 1966-1969.
