= T. D. Kendrick =

British archaeologist and art historian (1895–1979)

Sir Thomas Downing Kendrick KCB FBA FSA
- Born: 1 April 1895; Handsworth, West Midlands, England
- Died: 2 November 1979 (aged 84); Dorchester, Dorset, England
- Education: Oriel College, Oxford
- Occupations: Director and Principal Librarian of the British Museum (1950–1959)
- Notable work: A History of the Vikings (1930)
- Spouses: Ellen Martha Kiek; Katharine Elizabeth Wrigley
- Children: Frances Kendrick; Sally Maud Senior
- Parents: Thomas H. Kendrick (father); Fanny Susan nee Downing (mother)
- Relatives: William Kendrick (brother)
- Awards: Knight Commander of the Bath

Sir Thomas Downing Kendrick KCB FBA FSA (1 April 1895 – 2 November 1979) was a British archaeologist and art historian.

== Life ==
=== Early life ===
Kendrick was born on 1 April 1895 in Handsworth, a suburb of Birmingham, England, to Fanny Susan (nee Downing, born 1865) and Thomas H. Kendrick (1867–1902). He had a younger brother, William (born 1899). Following his father's death his mother married Prebendary Sowter in 1905.

He was educated at Charterhouse School and then spent a year at Oriel College, Oxford, prior to the outbreak of World War I. He joined the Royal Warwickshire Regiment in 1914. During which he was wounded in France and rose to the rank of captain. Resuming his studies at Oxford in 1918, he graduated in 1919 with a degree in anthropology and in 1920 with a Master of Arts also in anthropology. Kendrick stayed at Oxford and commenced a Bachelor of Science investigating the megaliths of the Channel Islands.

=== Career ===
His research experience enabled him to secure a position in 1922 as an assistant in the British and Medieval Antiquities Department of the British Museum.

Initially specializing in prehistoric art, Kendrick turned in the 1930s to Viking and Anglo-Saxon art, for which his two survey volumes were long standard references. He was appointed an assistant keeper at the British Museum in 1928. He coined the term "henge" in 1932 to describe a series of ceremonial monuments defined by ditches and banks of soil rather than standing stones. He was subsequently made keeper of the British and Medieval Antiquities Department in 1938.

In 1950 Kendrick was made director and principal librarian of the British Museum and remained in that position until he retired in 1959. He believed in cleaning museum objects, but this resulted in numerous bronze artifacts in his department being overcleaned.

He was a keen advocate of Victorian art, with assistance from the poet John Betjeman and the painter John Piper, amongst others. Kendrick's notes on Victorian stained glass were used by Nikolaus Pevsner for his Buildings of England series (now the Pevsner Architectural Guides).

He was honoured with the appointment as a Knight Commander of the Order of the Bath (KCB) in the 1951 Birthday Honours.

Kendrick died on 2 November 1979 in Dorchester.

== Personal life ==
In 1922, Kendrick married the pianist Ellen Martha Kiek (1898–1955), whom he had met at university. They had one daughter, Frances. Following Helen's death in 1955, Kendrick married Katherine Elizabeth Wrigley (1903–1980), a friend of the family.

Beginning in the late 1930 he had a six-year affair with Elizabeth Senior, who was 14 years younger than him. In 1941 Senior gave birth to a daughter, Sally Maud Senior. Elizabeth was killed by an air raid during the Blitz, around ten weeks after Sally was born. Sally was found alive by an ARP warden, stashed for safety under a table amongst the wreckage of their home, and was raised by her grandmother and aunt. It was only after she had children of her own that Sally Senior found out that her mother's old friend "Uncle Tom" Kendrick, whom she had known throughout her childhood, was her father.

During the early 1950s Kendrick had a relationship with the novelist Barbara Pym, who had been a friend of his daughter in the WRNS during the war.

== Publications ==
=== Books ===
- The Axe Age: a study in British prehistory (1925)
- The Druids: a study in Keltic prehistory (1927)
- A History of the Vikings (London: Methuen, 1930).
- Anglo-Saxon Art to A.D. 900 (1938)
- The Archaeology of the Channel Islands, 2 vols. (1928–38)
- Archaeology in England and Wales, 1914–1931 (1932)
- The Presidents of the Society of Antiquaries of London: with biographical notes (1945) (with Sir James Mann)
- Late Saxon and Viking art (1949)
- British Antiquity (1950)
- The Lisbon Earthquake (1956)
- St. James in Spain (1960)
- Great Love for Icarus (1962) – a semi-autobiographical novel
- Mary of Agreda: the life and legend of a Spanish nun (1967)

=== Articles ===
- Kendrick, T. D. (June 1932). "British Hanging Bowls". Antiquity. 6 (22): 161–184. doi:10.1017/S0003598X00006700. S2CID 163210163.
- Kendrick, T. D. (January 1941). "Notes: Portion of a basalt hone from North Wales". Antiquaries Journal. 21 (1): 73. doi:10.1017/S0003581500095354.
- Kendrick, T. D. (January 1941). "Notes: Gourd bottles from Sutton Hoo". Antiquaries Journal. 21 (1): 73–74. doi:10.1017/S0003581500095366.
- Kendrick, T. D. (January 1941). "Notes: Dug-out canoes in the British Museum". Antiquaries Journal. 21 (1): 74–75. doi:10.1017/S0003581500095378.
- Kendrick, T. D. (January 1941). "Notes: Fragment of a cross-head from Bath". Antiquaries Journal. 21 (1): 75–76. doi:10.1017/S000358150009538X.

== Sources ==
- Bruce-Mitford, Bruce (1991). "Thomas Downing Kendrick: 1895–1979" (PDF). Lectures and Memoirs. Proceedings of the British Academy. Vol. 76. Oxford: Oxford University Press. pp. 445–471. ISBN 0-19-726107-8. ISSN 0068-1202.
- Wilson, David M. (2005) [2004]. "Kendrick, Sir Thomas Downing". Oxford Dictionary of National Biography (online ed.). Oxford University Press. doi:10.1093/ref:odnb/31303. (Subscription, Wikipedia Library access or UK public library membership required.)
- "Sir Thomas Kendrick". The Times. 23 November 1979. p. 31.
