= Royal Naval Hospital =

Hospitals established by the British Royal Navy

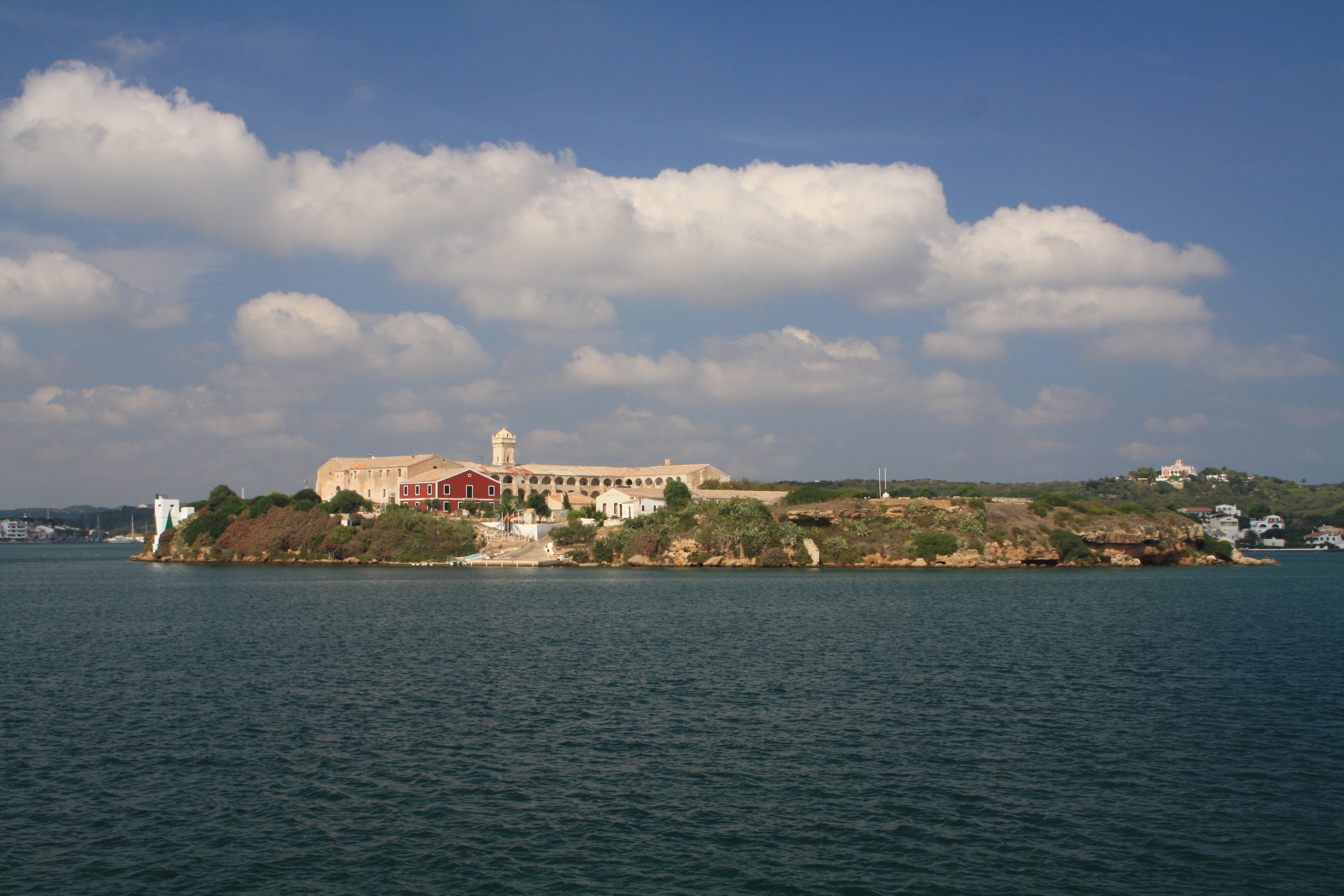
The earliest surviving Royal Naval Hospital complex is on the Illa del Rei, Port Mahon, Menorca (built 1711-12, extended 1771–76, restored 2011).

A Royal Naval Hospital (RNH) was a hospital operated by the British Royal Navy for the care and treatment of sick and injured naval personnel. A network of these establishments were situated across the globe to suit British interests. They were part of the Royal Naval Medical Service. The British Army equivalent was a Military Hospital, and in the 20th century a number of RAF Hospitals were also established.

The list below includes significant Royal Naval Hospitals established in the 18th-20th centuries; in addition numerous smaller facilities (often classed as Sick Quarters) were set up, where and when needed (especially in times of war).

In 1996 the UK's last remaining Royal Naval Hospital was redesignated as a Joint Services establishment; it finally closed just over a decade later. No Royal Naval Hospitals survive in operation, although some have become civilian hospitals.

== Historical overview ==
Individual surgeons had been appointed to naval vessels since Tudor times; the Company of Barber-Surgeons was expected to provide them in suitable numbers whenever the fleet was due to set sail. Once the fleet returned, responsibility for the care of any sick or injured seamen reverted to their home parishes. This arrangement came under significant pressure during the Anglo-Dutch Wars: in 1652 the Admiralty Committee resolved to provide the mayors and magistrates of seaport towns (and other affected locations) with financial support to provide accommodation for the care and treatment of sick and wounded seamen. A house was hired in Deal (and staffed by a surgeon under contract) to serve as a hospital; and elsewhere civilian hospitals were part-requisitioned for naval use. The following year, commissioners of sick and wounded were appointed to supervise the distribution of funds, the provision of surgeons and medicines, the deployment of patients (and, where possible, their eventual return to service). Later, temporary hospitals were provided in locations such as Ipswich, Harwich and Rochester; while in Plymouth a hospital was established on a more permanent footing in 1689. All these, however, were 'contract' hospitals: privately owned and staffed by civilians, who were treating naval personnel under contract.

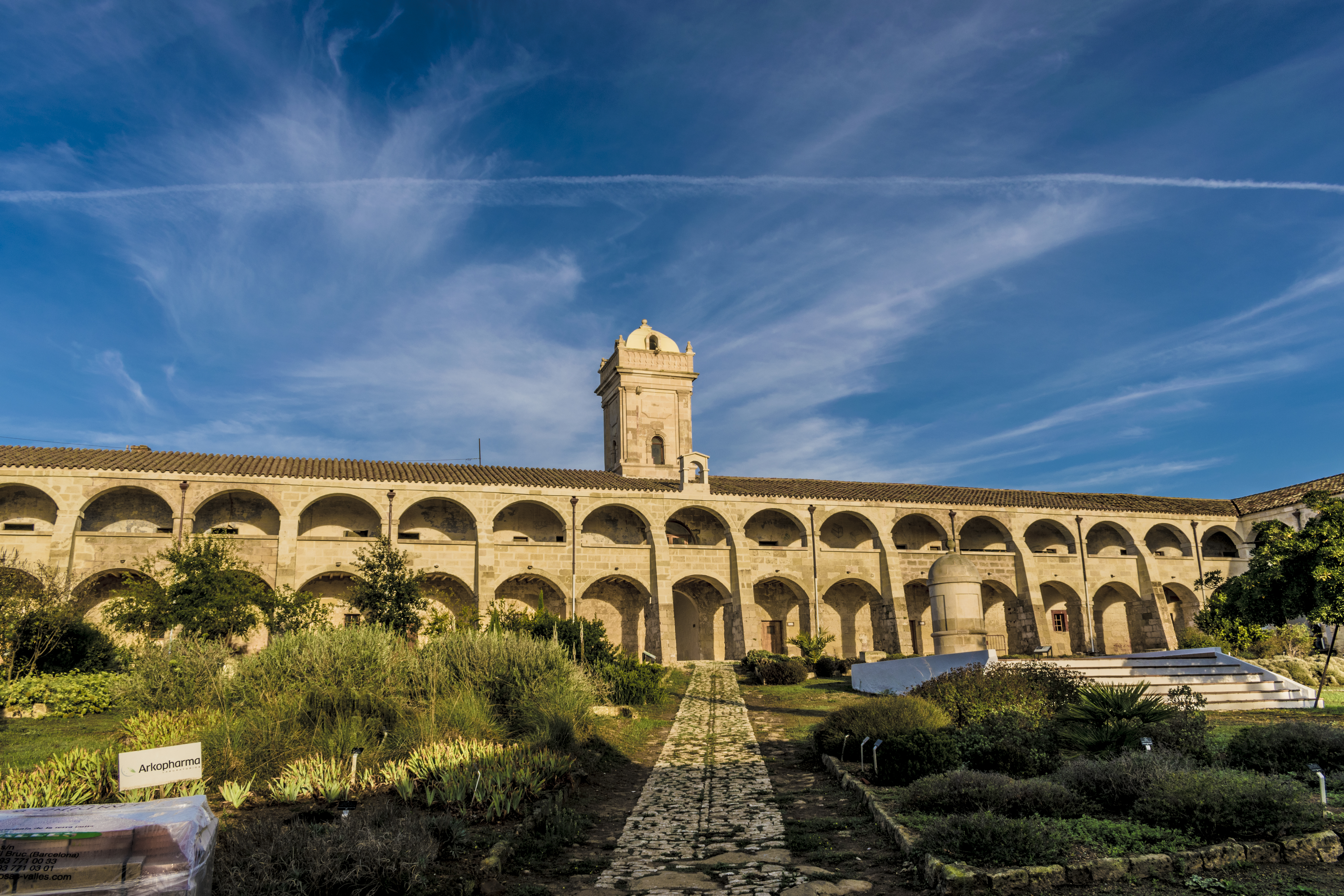
Illa Del Rei, Port Mahon, Menorca: the main range when built had ten separate wards, linked by a verandah.

Further afield in the seventeenth century, crews began to be exposed to unfamiliar illnesses on increasingly long sea-voyages. One response, first proposed in 1664, was the provision of hospital ships to accompany the fleet on more distant expeditions; but by the beginning of the 18th century permanent onshore hospital provision was being contemplated for overseas bases. An early experiment was the prefabricated hospital set up in Jamaica by Admiral John Benbow in 1701, for which the Sick and Hurt Commissioners provided a salaried surgeon and other staff. This was followed by the provision of staffed hospitals in Lisbon in 1705 and Minorca in 1709; those at Jamaica and Lisbon closed in 1712, but the naval hospital at Port Mahon, Minorca was retained on a more permanent footing (having moved into a new purpose-built complex on the Illa del Rei that same year).

At home, however, the navy continued to rely on contract hospitals, such as the Fortune Hospital in Gosport (opened under contract in 1713). When additional capacity was required inns were often hired and converted into sick quarters, or beds set aside in the large London hospitals.

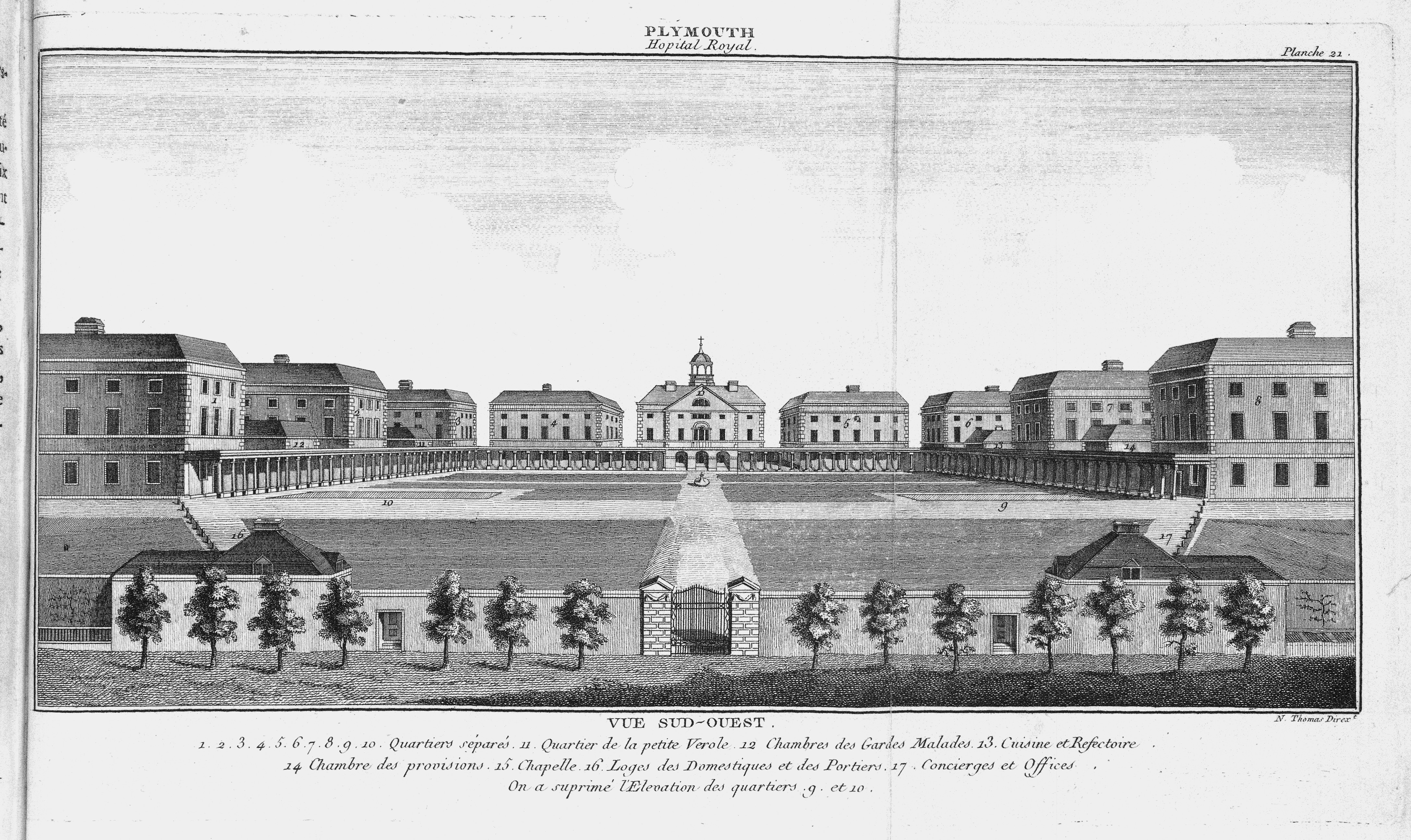
18th-century engraving of the Royal Naval Hospital at Plymouth.

During the War of Jenkins' Ear, however, the system was overwhelmed by large numbers of returning sick and injured (over 15,000 in the 13 months from July 1739 to August 1740). The following year a proposal was put forward to the Admiralty for the establishment of three hospitals, to be owned, built and run by the Royal Navy, in the vicinity of the principal home ports. In 1744, with France having declared war on Britain, the decision was finally taken to establish Royal Naval Hospitals on a permanent footing in Gosport (Royal Hospital Haslar) and Stonehouse (Royal Hospital Plymouth); however a proposed third hospital (at Queenborough) was not then built, as Chatham by that time had ceased to function as a front-line base.

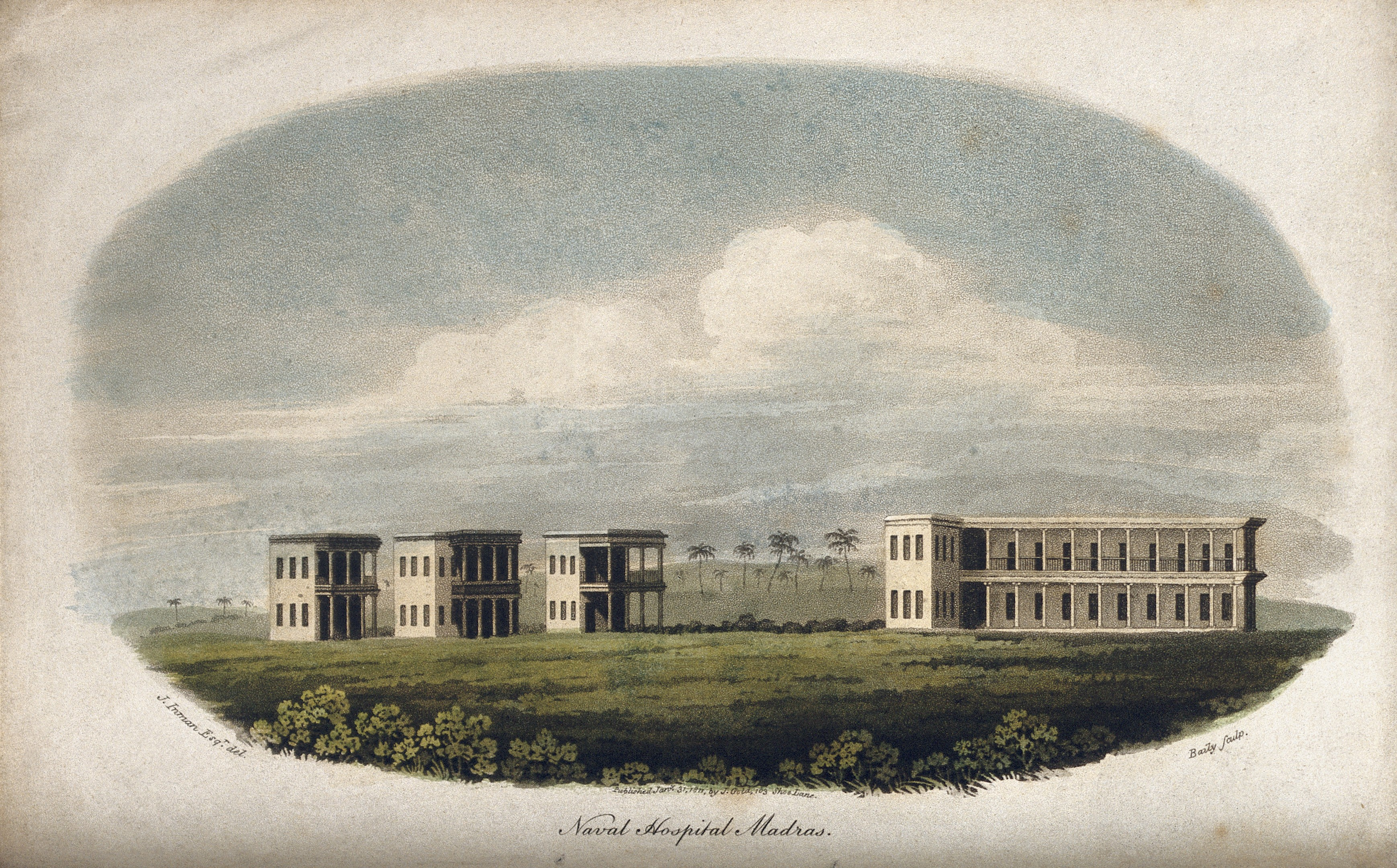
Naval hospital, Madras: coloured aquatint by James Baily, 1811.

In the decades that followed more Royal Naval Hospitals were established, both at home and abroad. During the Napoleonic Wars there were five naval hospitals operating in England: in addition to Haslar and Plymouth, hospitals were established at Paignton (for the Channel Fleet), Great Yarmouth (for the North Sea and Baltic Fleets) and Deal. At the same time hospital ships were provided at Woolwich, Sheerness and Chatham. Gibraltar served the needs of the fleet in the Mediterranean at this time (Minorca having been ceded to Spain); while, further afield, Royal Naval Hospitals had been established in various locations including India, North America and the Caribbean.

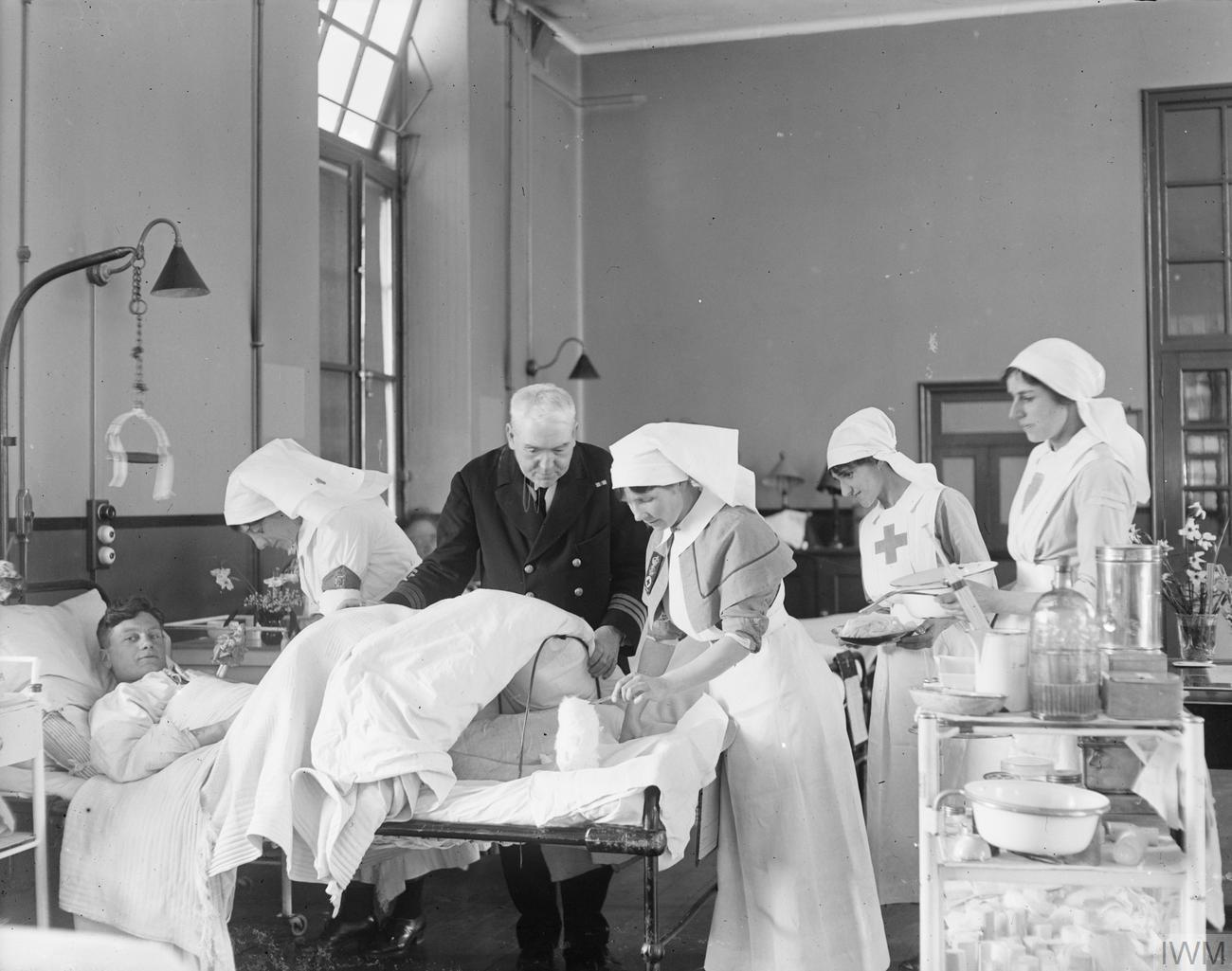
RNH Chatham during the First World War: a naval surgeon, two QARNNS nurses and members of the VAD attend to a wounded sailor.

At the start of the First World War, the three principal naval hospitals in the UK were Haslar, Plymouth and the new RNH Chatham (each serving the needs of one of the three home Commands: Portsmouth, Plymouth and The Nore, respectively). Yarmouth was also retained, as a psychiatric hospital (having served in that capacity since 1863). Smaller hospitals at Portland, South Queensferry, Pembroke Dock and Haulbowline served nearby naval dockyards; while Scotland, where the Grand Fleet was based, saw two hospitals commandeered for use by the Admiralty: Leith Public Health Hospital became Royal Hospital Granton in 1917, and the Stirling District Asylum briefly became RNH Larbert in 1918. The main overseas Royal Naval Hospitals at this time were on Malta, Gibraltar, Bermuda, the Cape of Good Hope and Hong Kong.

In the 1920s a degree of rationalisation took place: Chatham Military Hospital and Gibraltar's Royal Naval Hospital were both closed (on the understanding that Chatham's army personnel could be treated at the naval hospital there, and Gibraltar's naval personnel at the military hospital there). Not long afterwards military hospitals near Portsmouth and Plymouth were also closed on the understanding that soldiers could be treated at the nearby naval hospitals.

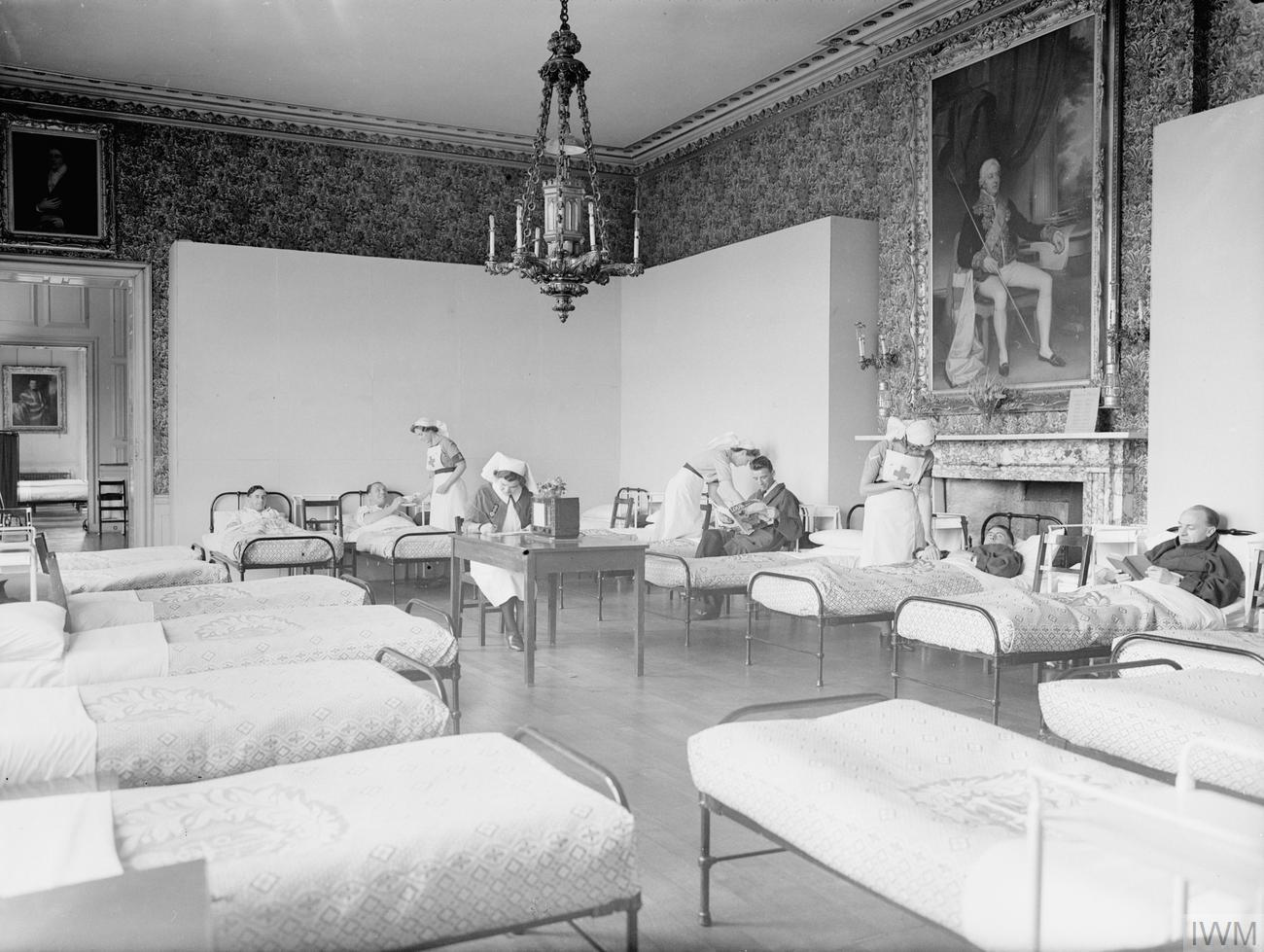
A ward in the RN Auxiliary Hospital, Cholmondeley Castle (July 1942).

During the Second World War there was concern about the vulnerability of the older hospitals (which were prominent buildings close to naval dockyards) to aerial bombardment. Auxiliary hospitals were opened in safer locations around Britain (usually in requisitioned civilian hospitals, but schools, hotels and country houses were also used). Malta was also seen as vulnerable to attack, so an auxiliary hospital was opened in a wing of Victoria College, Alexandria to serve the needs of the Mediterranean Fleet. Further east, RNH Hong Kong was destroyed by bombing in 1941, leaving auxiliary hospitals in Ceylon, South Africa and Oceania to take up the strain.

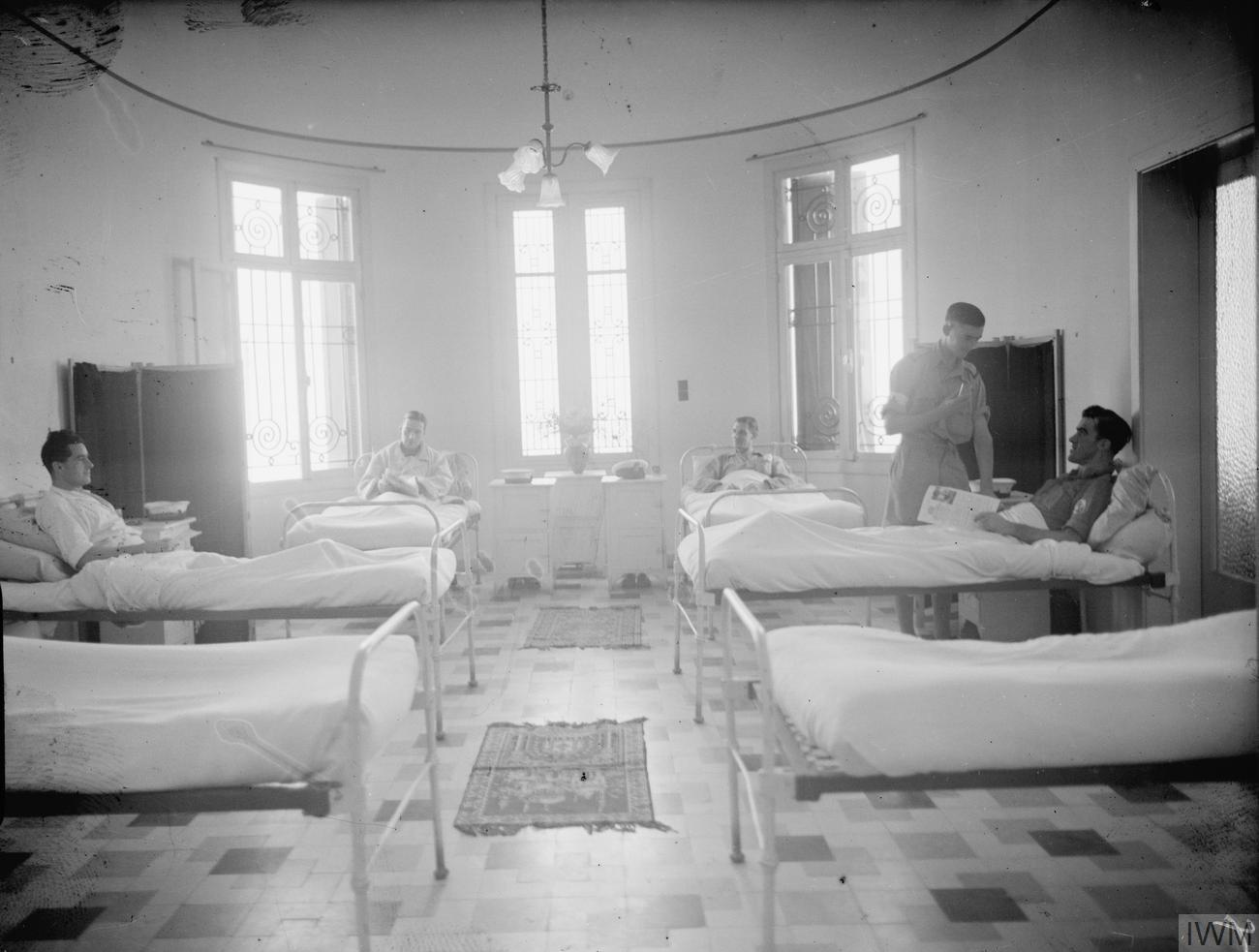
RN Sick Quarters in the Aley District above Beirut (c.1942-1945).

In addition, numerous Royal Naval Sick Quarters (defined as 'junior to a general hospital, but senior to a sick bay') were established during the Second World War ('sometimes almost overnight') to meet the needs of the moment: by 1945 there were over a hundred such facilities operating at home and several dozen abroad.

A number of naval hospitals were closed (or transferred to civilian operation) in the late 1950s and early 1960s. In the 1990s, the total number of remaining Naval, Military and RAF Hospitals in the UK was progressively cut from seven, to three, to one: the naval hospital at Haslar (thenceforward to be run as a tri-service institution); by the end of the decade, its closure too had been announced.

== List of Royal Naval Hospitals ==
=== United Kingdom ===
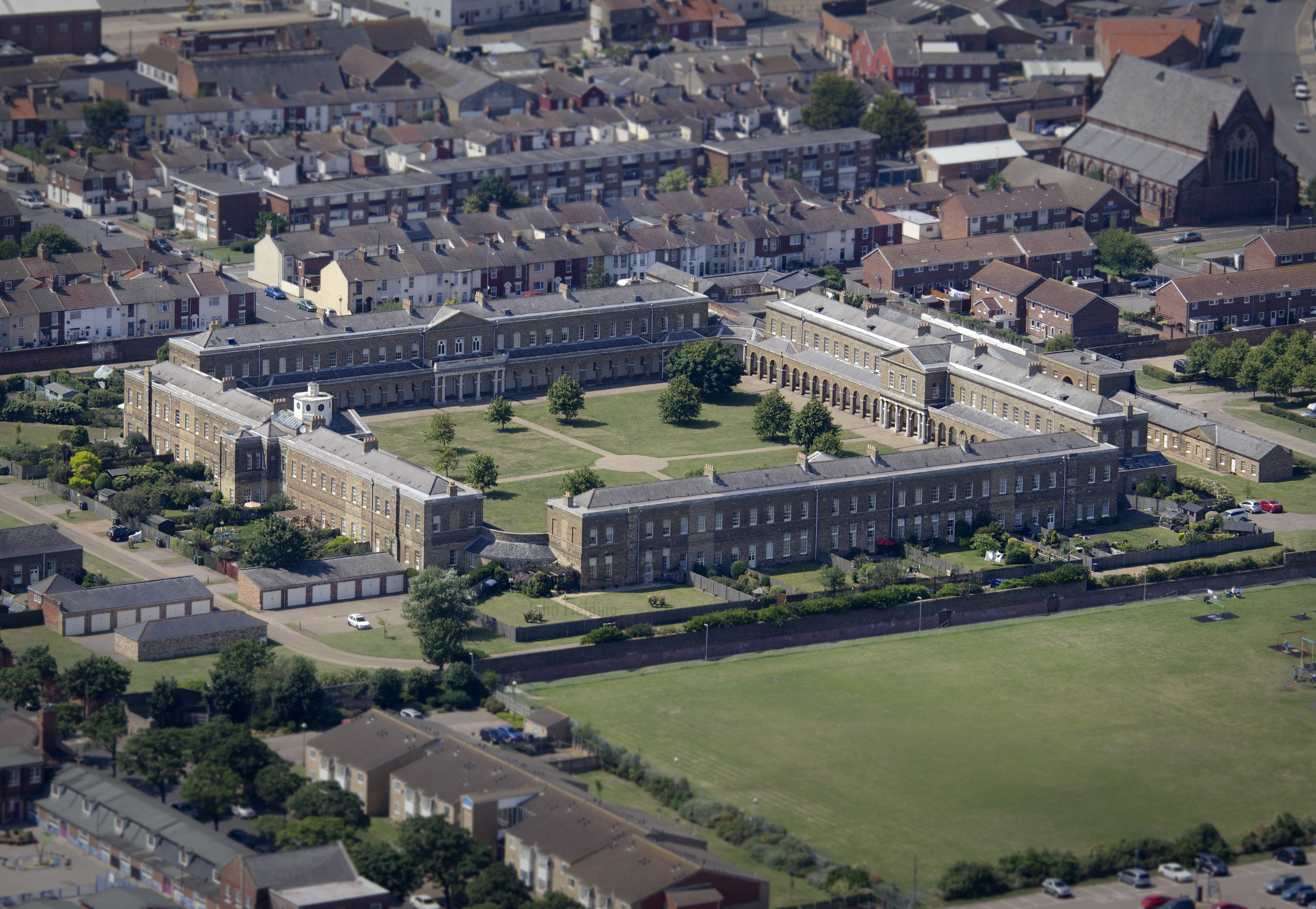
RNH Great Yarmouth, built 1809–11, architect: William Pilkington.

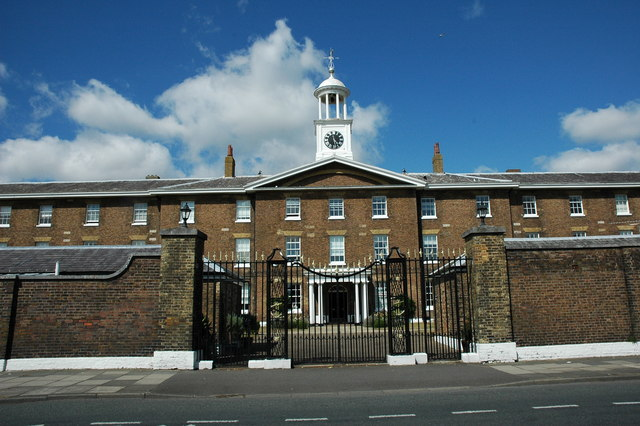
Former Royal Naval Hospital in Deal, Kent.

- Royal Naval Hospital Haslar (Gosport); opened 1753 as the Royal Hospital Haslar, designated as the tri-Service core military hospital in 1996. The military withdrew in 2007 and it closed in 2009; undergoing conversion into a residential retirement village.
- Royal Naval Hospital, Plymouth (Stonehouse); opened 1760, closed 1995, converted into flats.
- Royal Naval Hospital Great Yarmouth; opened 1793 to serve ships anchoring in Yarmouth Roads, relocated 1815, specialised in psychiatric cases from 1863; transferred to NHS 1958, closed and converted to residential flats 1993.
- Royal Naval Hospital Deal, Kent; opened 1800 to serve naval vessels anchored in The Downs, converted into Royal Marine Barracks in 1863 and occupied by the Royal Naval (later Royal Marine) School of Music from 1930 to 1996.
- Royal Naval Hospital Paignton; opened 1800 to serve the naval anchorage of Tor Bay, closed 1816.
- Melville Hospital, Chatham: opened as a Royal Marine Infirmary in 1828, became a Royal Naval Hospital in 1885; replaced by a new Royal Naval Hospital in 1905 (the old buildings became an extension to the Royal Marine Barracks, but were demolished c.1960).
  - Royal Naval Hospital Chatham (Gillingham, Kent); opened 1905 (replacing the Melville Hospital); transferred to NHS in 1961, now Medway Maritime Hospital (NHS).
- Royal Naval Hospital, Haulbowline, Ireland; began as a temporary hospital (1820), established on a permanent footing in 1862. Transferred with the rest of the Naval Dockyard to the Irish Government in 1923.
- Royal Naval Hospital, Portland, Dorset; opened 1901, closed 1957.
- Royal Naval Hospital, Pembroke Dock; opened 1902, expanded by the RAF during World War II, transferred to the NHS in 1961 (now South Pembrokeshire Hospital).
- Butlaw Naval Hospital (Royal Naval Sick Quarters, South Queensferry); small hospital opened c.1910 to serve the new Royal Dockyard at Rosyth, expanded during World War I, closed 1928.
  - Royal Naval Hospital Port Edgar opened in 1939, remained active throughout World War II; closed 1950.
- Royal Naval Hospital Granton; opened January 1917 to serve vessels based in Scottish waters, closed 1920.

=== Overseas ===
Hospitals were established close to several of the overseas Naval Yards and anchorages, including:

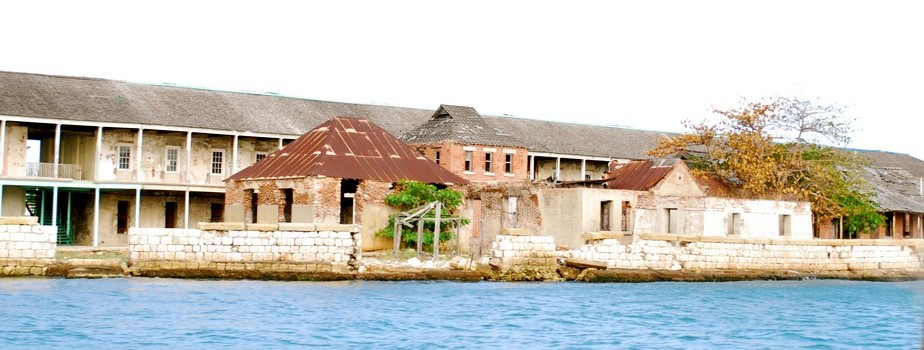
Royal Naval Hospital buildings of 1821 in Port Royal, Jamaica; Admiral Benbow had established the island's first naval hospital in 1701.

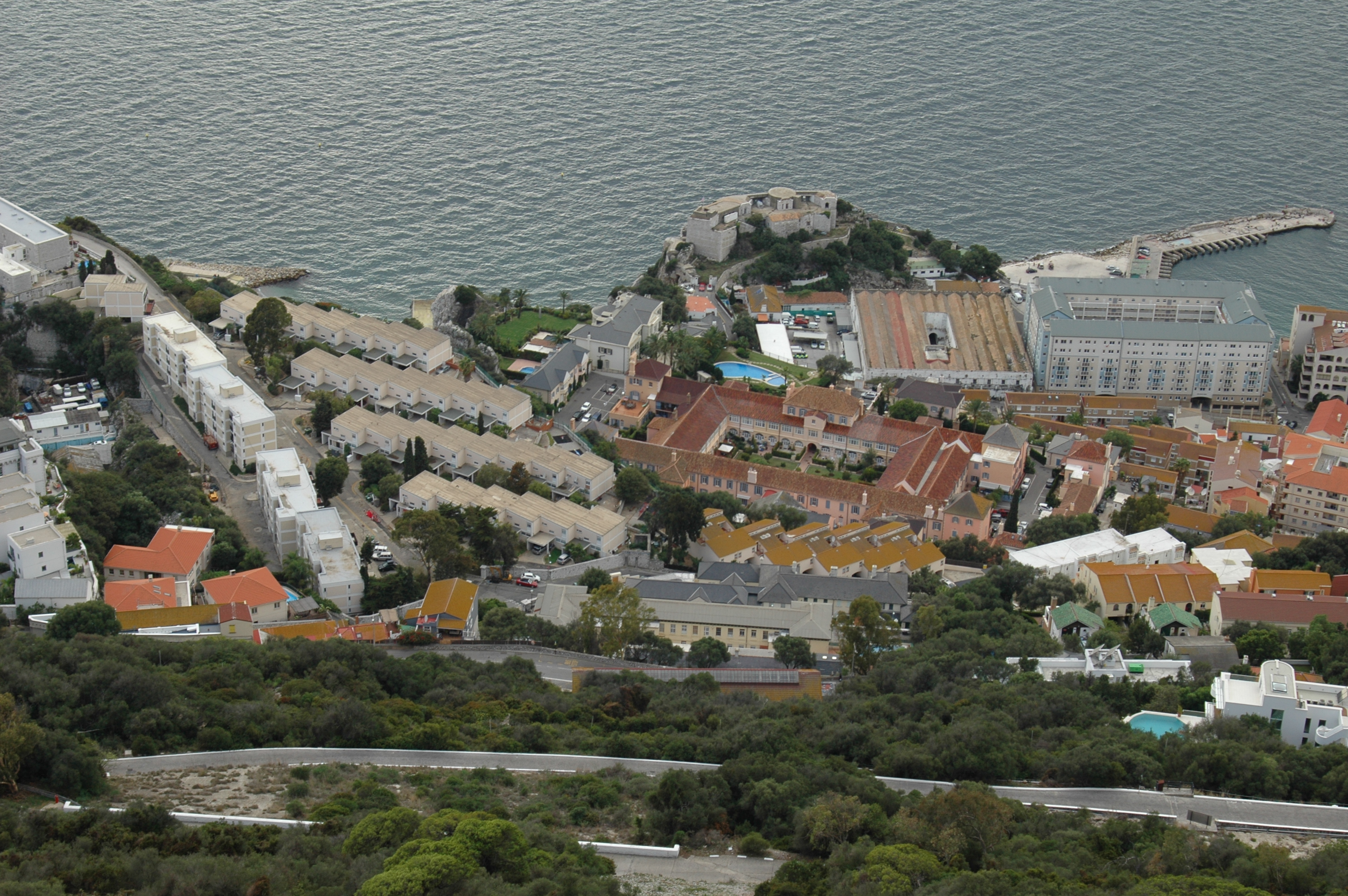
Pink-rendered quadrangle of the old Naval Hospital in Gibraltar (1741).

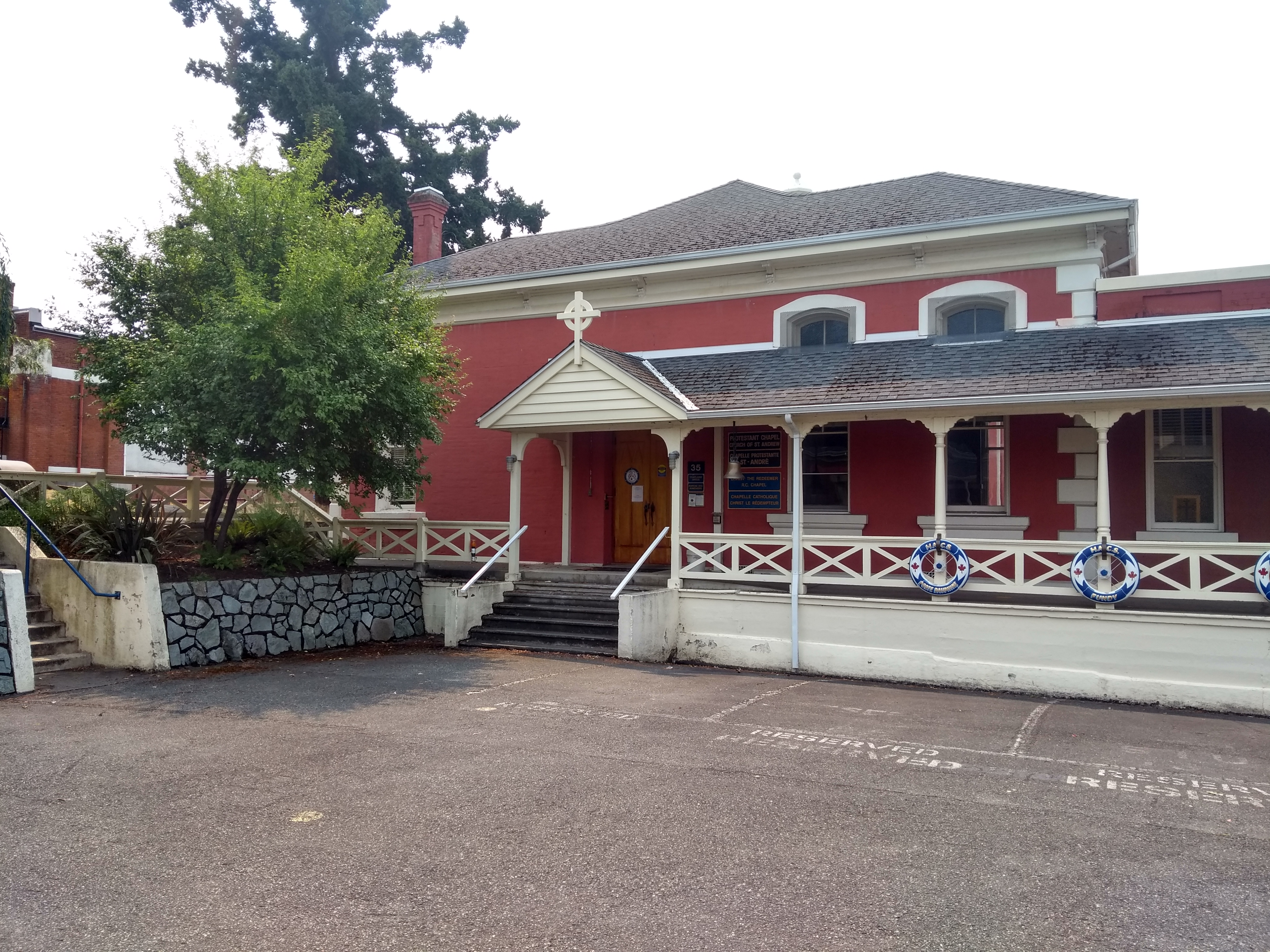
Former south ward of the pavilion hospital at Esquimalt (John Teague, 1888).

- Royal Naval Hospital, Jamaica (1701), closed in 1712. Re-established at New Greenwich (1743), moved to Port Royal (1755), rebuilt in 1818, closed 1905.
- Royal Naval Hospital, Lisbon (1705), opened in rented premises, closed 1712. Re-established at Almada (1797) to receive wounded from the Battle of St Vincent. Reopened in the 1850s, it operated as an extra-territorial British enclave on the Travessa do Ferreiro; closed 1890.
- Royal Naval Hospital, Port Mahon, Menorca (1709), settled in purpose-built premises on the Illa del Rei in the harbour (1711), ceded to Spain 1782 but remained in use thereafter until c.1960.
- Old Naval Hospital, Gibraltar (1741) closed in 1922 (and subsequently served as naval married quarters); buildings survive having been converted into housing.
  - Royal Naval Hospital Gibraltar (1963) (established as a Military Hospital in 1903), closed in 2008.
- Royal Naval Hospital, Madras (1745), closed in 1790, new hospital opened 1808, closed 1831 (became a gun-carriage factory).
- Royal Naval Hospital, English Harbour, Antigua (1763) destroyed by a hurricane and rebuilt 1783, closed 1825.
- Royal Naval Hospital, Halifax, Nova Scotia, Canada (1782) rebuilt 1863, closed 1911 (taken over by the Royal Naval College of Canada).
- Royal Naval Hospital, Simon's Town, Cape of Good Hope (1813), rebuilt on higher ground in 1899 (an aerial ropeway provided access from 1904 to 1934), closed 1957. Buildings currently used by South African Navy Band.
- Royal Naval Hospital, Bermuda (1818), closed in 1957, demolished in 1972 (except the zymotic (isolation) block of 1899, which is now an old people's home). In 1976, the world's biggest underwater set, containing a submerged shipwreck sound stage, was built at the site of the demolished main building while filming the movie The Deep.
- Royal Naval Hospital, Georgetown, Ascension Island (1831) remains in use as a civilian hospital.
- Royal Naval Hospital, Bighi, Malta (1832), closed 1970.
  - Royal Naval Hospital, Mtarfa, Malta (1970) (established as a Military Hospital in 1912), closed 1978.
- Royal Naval Hospital, Esquimalt, British Columbia, Canada (1855) rebuilt 1887–91, closed 1922.
- Royal Naval Hospital, Trincomalee Garrison, Ceylon (present-day Sri Lanka) (1871).
- Royal Naval Hospital, Wanchai, Hong Kong (1873), destroyed 1941 (site became Ruttonjee Hospital).
  - New naval hospital (War Memorial Hospital) Hong Kong (1949), closed 1959 (site taken over by the nearby Matilda Hospital).
- Royal Naval Hospital, Yokohama, Japan (1876), (the Hong Kong hospital establishment routinely moved to Yokohama each summer); destroyed in the Great Earthquake of 1923.

Other naval hospitals were established in other overseas locations, usually in the vicinity of other small naval establishments (e.g. coaling or supply yards) including on Long Island, New York (1779), Newfoundland, St Lucia (1783), Kingston, Ontario (1813–14), Barbados (1815), Fernando Po, Mauritius and Wei-Hai-Wei.

=== Royal Naval Auxiliary Hospitals ===
During the Second World War around thirty 'R.N. Auxiliary Hospitals' were established in various locations, at home and abroad, on a temporary basis.

==== United Kingdom ====
- RN Auxiliary Hospital Barrow Gurney
- RN Auxiliary Hospital Cholmondeley Castle
- RN Auxiliary Hospital Rainhill
- RN Auxiliary Hospital Southport
- RN Auxiliary Hospital Dartmouth
- RN Auxiliary Hospital Durdham Down, Bristol
- RN Auxiliary Hospital East Anglia
- RN Auxiliary Hospital Idsworth
- RN Auxiliary Hospital Invergordon
- RN Auxiliary Hospital Kilmacolm
- RN Auxiliary Hospital Kingseat
- RN Auxiliary Hospital Knowle
- RN Auxiliary Hospital Lancaster
- RN Auxiliary Hospital Derry
- RN Auxiliary Hospital Minterne Magna
- RN Auxiliary Hospital Newton Abbot
- RN Auxiliary Hospital Seaforth
- RN Auxiliary Hospital Sherborne
- RN Auxiliary Hospital Woolton

==== Overseas ====
- RN Auxiliary Hospital Alexandria
- RN Auxiliary Hospital Bombay
- RN Auxiliary Hospital Brisbane
- RN Auxiliary Hospital Colombo
- RN Auxiliary Hospital St Peters, Colombo
- RN Auxiliary Hospital Diyatalawa
- RN Auxiliary Hospital Durban
- RN Auxiliary Hospital Mombasa
- RN Auxiliary Hospital Sydney
- RN Auxiliary Hospital Trincomalee

=== Royal Marine Infirmaries ===
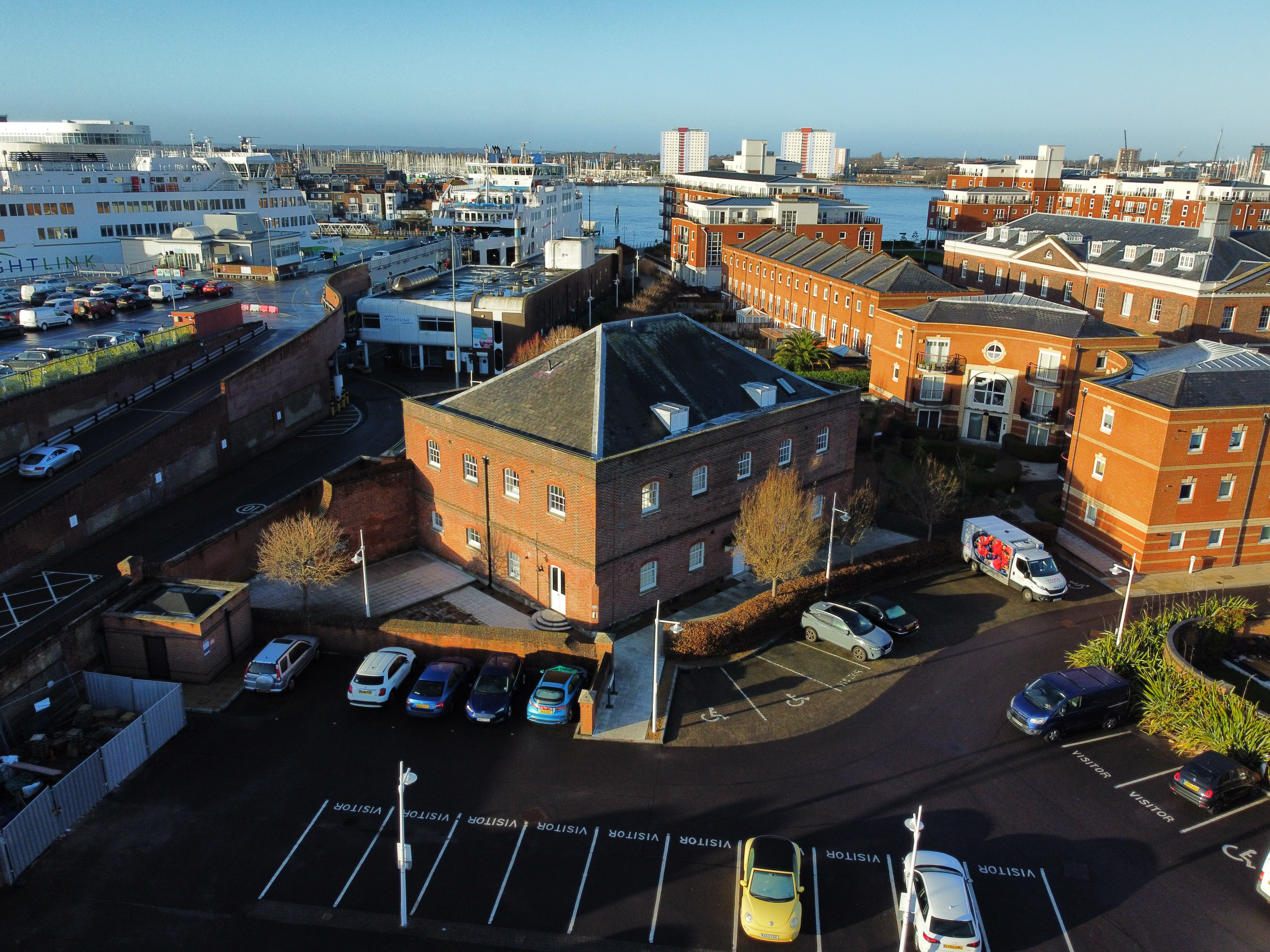
Former RM Infirmary at Gunwharf Quays, Portsmouth (one time barracks of the Royal Marine Artillery).

In addition to the RN Hospitals, the Admiralty established Royal Marine Infirmaries near the divisional headquarters in Chatham, Deal, Plymouth, Portsmouth and Woolwich, along with a separate Royal Marine Artillery Infirmary at Gun Wharf Barracks, Portsmouth (which later moved, together with the RMA, to nearby Fort Cumberland).

=== The Royal Hospital at Greenwich ===
Greenwich Hospital, which predated all the above institutions, was established on somewhat different grounds, as it cared for retired seamen rather than those on active service. Also called the Royal Hospital for Seamen in Greenwich, it was a home for Greenwich pensioners, established in 1692, and although closed at Greenwich in 1869 still exists as a charity. Its buildings housed the Royal Naval College, Greenwich between 1873 and 1998 and are now open to the public as the Old Royal Naval College.

== Capacity ==
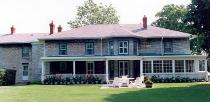
The small former hospital of 1814 at Kingston dockyard now serves as the commandant's residence, Royal Military College of Canada.

The size and capacity of the naval hospitals varied over time, as well as from place to place. The hospital at Port Mahon had opened with 356 beds in 1711; its capacity was later increased to 550, and then more than doubled to 1,200 (following the addition of an upper floor to the hospital building in 1772). Meanwhile, RNH Gibraltar was designed to accommodate up to a thousand patients when it opened in 1746.

Haslar was always the largest of the naval hospitals: when fully opened in 1762 it had beds for 1,800 patients, by 1778 it could accommodate 2,100; while RNH Plymouth opened in 1762 with 1,200 beds. These numbers were subsequently scaled down, as efforts were made to reduce overcrowding (e.g. by the end of the 19th century Plymouth had fourteen beds to a ward, rather than twenty). In times of war, on the other hand, hospital capacities were often significantly increased (sometimes by the addition of tented or hutted or other temporary accommodation).

By the end of the 19th century Haslar had accommodation for just under 1,300 patients, but on average fewer than 500 beds were occupied at any one time. At the other end of the scale, the naval hospital on Ascension Island, had 65 beds, and RNH Esquimalt (the smallest of the naval hospitals at that time) had accommodation for 40. Several of the hospitals had their capacities increased during the First and Second World Wars; the following table shows the peace time capacity of the principal home and overseas Royal Naval Hospitals during the inter-war period.

RN Hospital capacities in 1925
RN Hospital	Total number of beds
Haslar	1,151
Plymouth	860
Chatham	599
Portland	117
South Queensferrry	100
Malta	365
Hong Kong	125
Bermuda	78
Cape of Good Hope	48
Wei-Hai-Wei	38

== Command and oversight ==
In the early decades of their existence, the hospitals at Haslar and Plymouth were each overseen by a 'Physician and Council' (the Physician being the senior medical officer on the staff). The Council was made up of a small number of Surgeons and two other hospital officers (the Agent and Steward) who had administrative and logistical responsibilities.

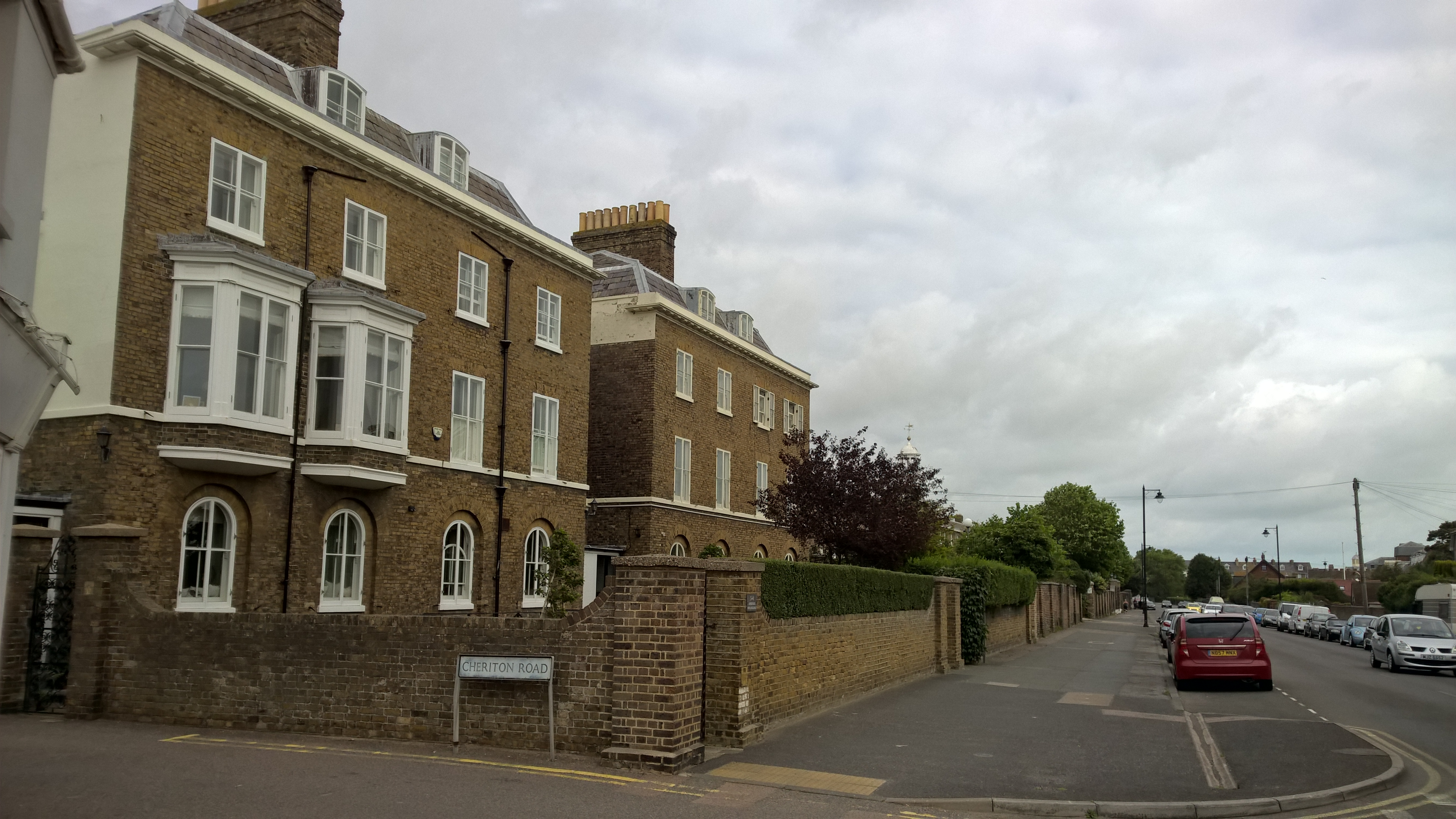
The officers' dwellings at RNH Deal (built in 1813 to house the Governor, Physician, Surgeon and Agent).

In 1795, following an enquiry into the situation at Haslar, it was judged that the two naval hospitals were suffering from 'a want of proper discipline and subordination'. To counter this, the decision was taken to remove administrative oversight from the medical staff and to vest it in a trio or quartet of serving naval officers, who were given accommodation on site: the Governor (usually a post-captain) and two or three Lieutenants. This situation pertained until 1820, when the Governor was replaced by a Resident Commissioner of the Victualling Service, who had oversight of the local victualling yard as well as of the hospital. In 1840 the title of this 'dual-hatted' officer was changed to Captain-superintendent. (Throughout this period the overseas hospitals, which had a far smaller staff establishment, continued (almost invariably) to be overseen by the senior medical officer on station.)

In 1869 an enquiry took place into the condition and organisation of the naval hospitals; the report was presented to Parliament and the following year saw the Captains-superintendent and Lieutenants of naval hospitals abolished. Afterwards, oversight reverted to the Medical Officer in Charge.
