= Medway Maritime Hospital =

- Medway NHS Foundation Trust
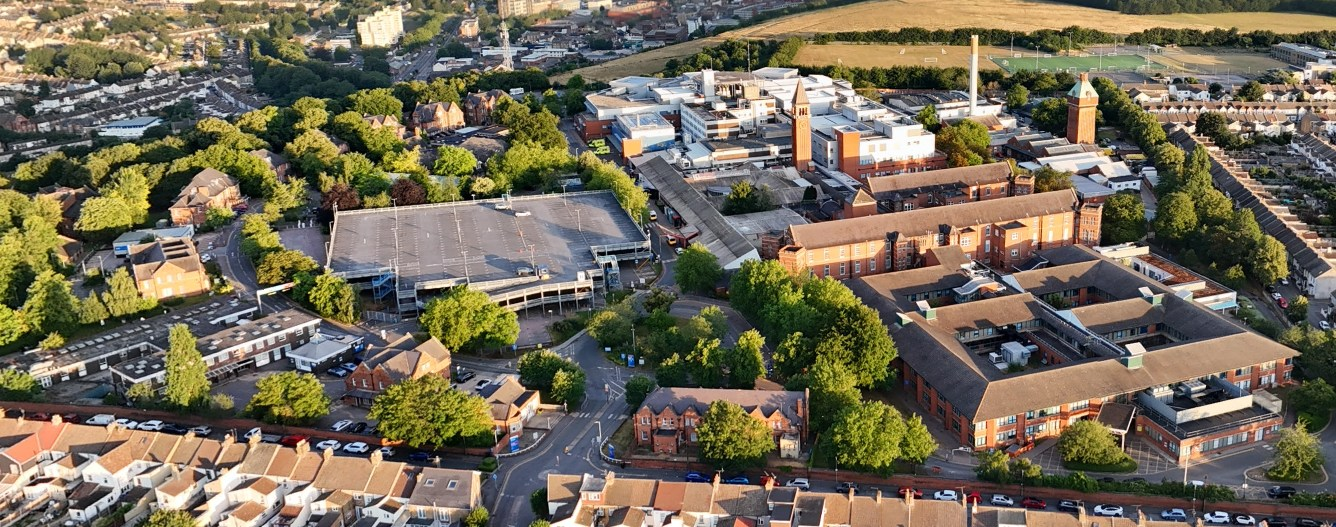
- Aerial view of Medway Maritime Hospital

Geography
- Location: Gillingham, Kent, England
- Coordinates: 51°22′48″N 0°32′31″E

Organisation
- Care system: National Health Service
- Type: General

Services
- Emergency department: Yes
- Beds: 588

History
- Founded: 1905

Links
- Website: www.medway.nhs.uk

Medway Maritime Hospital is a general hospital in Gillingham, Kent, England. It is run by Medway NHS Foundation Trust. It is Kent's largest and busiest hospital, dealing with around 400,000 patients annually. It was founded in the early 1900s as a Royal Naval Hospital for naval personnel at Chatham Dockyard and the nearby Royal Naval Barracks.

In 2005 an unidentified person later dubbed the 'Piano Man' was taken to the hospital having been found wandering through Sheerness in a soaking wet suit and tie.

== Services ==
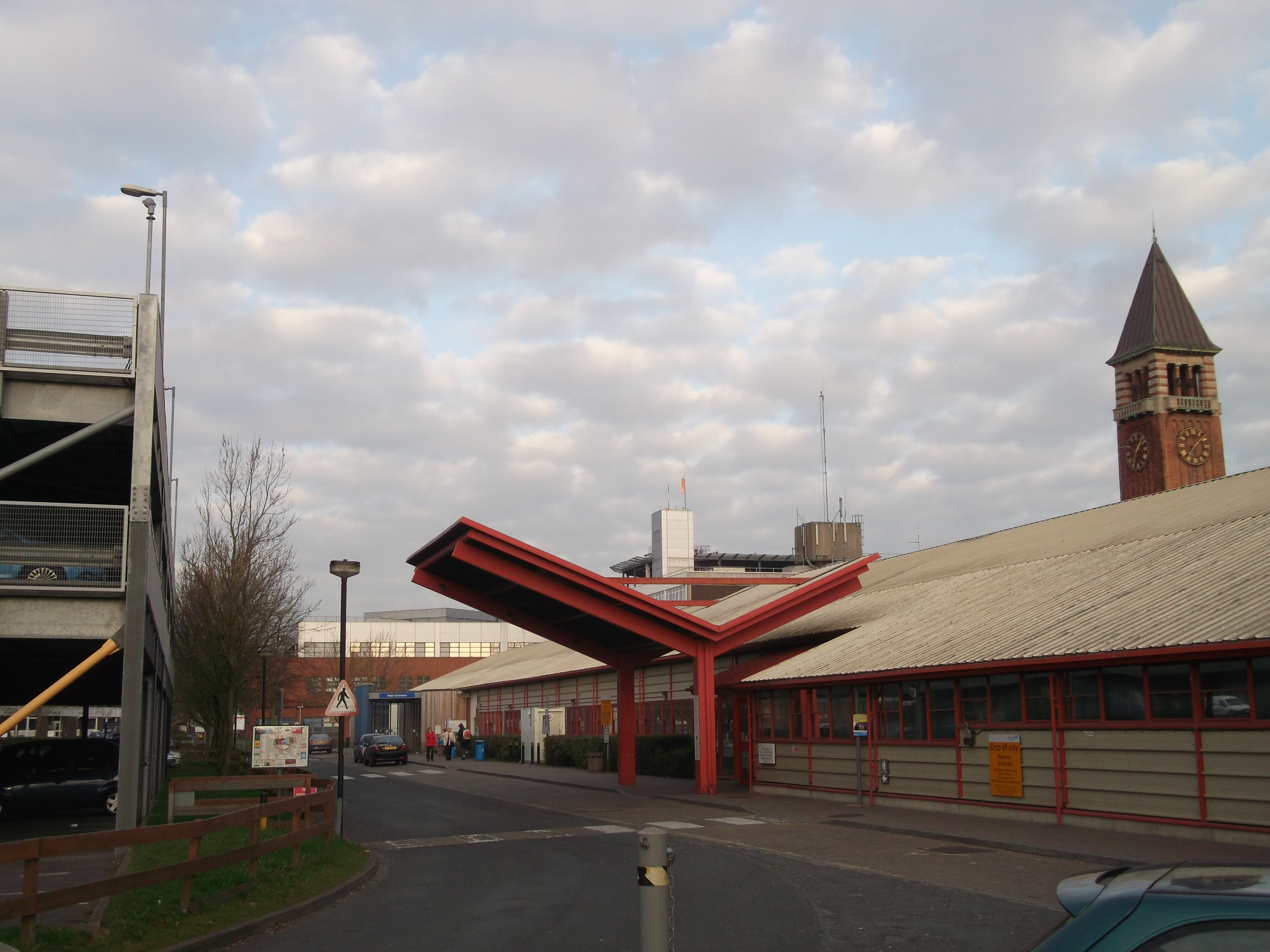
Medway Maritime Hospital: looking towards the main entrance

Medway Maritime Hospital has 588 beds in 29 wards under five main departments: accident and emergency, adult medicine, surgery and anaesthetics, children and women, clinical support services. Under an ongoing and regularly updated NHS survey, the quality of service is regarded as "fair", with 96% of patients waiting less than 18 weeks for treatment. The hospital is run by the Medway NHS Foundation Trust, one of four hospital trusts in Kent. The trust employs over 3,500 staff. The trust's main focus is running the Medway Maritime Hospital.

Emergency and elective abdominal aortic aneurysm repairs were moved from the hospital to Kent and Canterbury Hospital in February 2020 because of staff shortages.

=== Hospital Radio Medway ===
Medway Hospital Radio was formed in 1970. The radio station has over 45 volunteers and 2 broadcast studios located in the basement of the hospital. It broadcasts to all the wards in the hospital. The radio station officially went live on the Hospital website at the end of 2017. All hospicoms in the wards within the building have now been removed as of 2018. WiFi has now been installed in the hospital for the use of the public.

== History ==
=== Royal Naval Hospital, Chatham ===
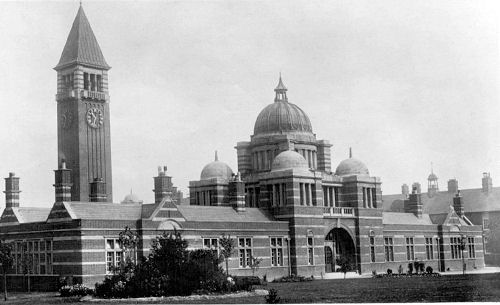
RNH Chatham: the Administrative Block and Clock Tower. (The dome above the entrance allowed daylight into the main laboratory below.)

The hospital was built on a 39-acre (16 ha) site on Chatham Hill on the edge of Gillingham, alongside the Great Lines. It was envisaged as a replacement for the 252 bed Melville Hospital, which was not large enough to deal with the increasing numbers of Naval personnel who had moved into Chatham following the opening of the naval barracks. Building work began in 1900 and the new hospital, constructed of red bricks with stone dressings, was opened by King Edward VII on 26 July 1905. The architect was John C. T. Murray. Construction had cost just under £800,000; the clock tower, which was not part of the original plan, was funded using left over money from the plastering budget.

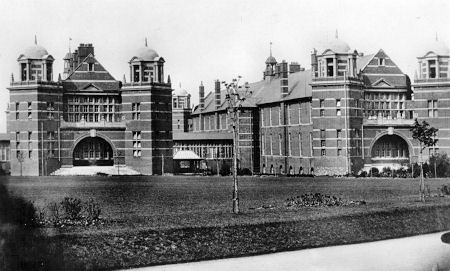
Pavilion ward blocks at Chatham. At the end of each block was a verandah, flanked by 'sanitary towers' containing sluice rooms and lavatories.

The new hospital had beds for six hundred patients, with provision for accommodating over nine hundred in the event of a war. It was built on the 'pavilion system': the main wards were contained in nine two-storey pavilions, built either side of a long central corridor (almost 1,000 feet long), which stretched from east to west across the centre of the site. The four pavilions to the west were designated as medical wards, the five to the east as surgical wards. There were two operating theatres. Also linked to the corridor was a central kitchen and the main administrative block, which (as well as offices) contained admission and outpatient rooms, a museum and library, pathology labs and various other facilities.

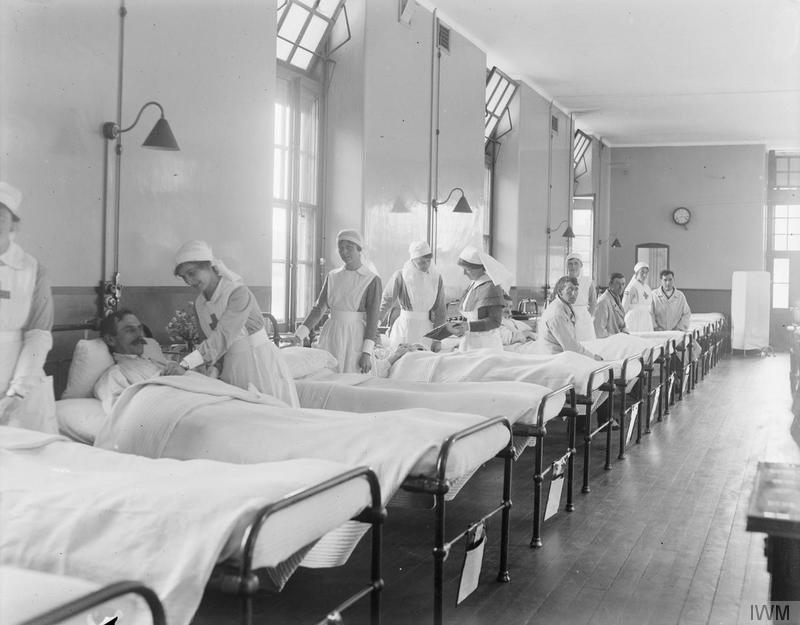
Inside one of the wards at the time of the First World War.

Behind the main hospital, directly to the north, was the laundry and engine room with its large combined water tower and chimney (which today acts as a local landmark over Gillingham and is a Grade II listed building). To the south was a large detached chapel (St Luke's Church) and, built in a semi-circle around the southern edge of the site, a series of residences for the medical officers, nursing sisters and sick berth attendants. In the north-west corner of the site, separated from the main hospital by a double fence, was a self-contained 'infectious division' with its own pavilion wards, kitchen and receiving/discharge blocks.

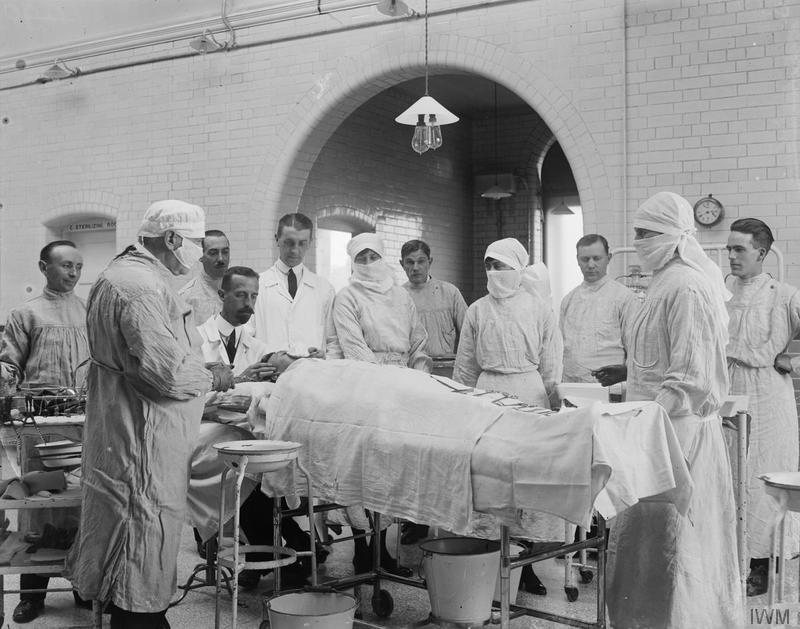
One of the operating theatres at the time of the First World War.

The hospital as a whole had been designed with plenty of open space, which was available for the use of patients and convalescents. Verandahs were provided for patients unable to access the grounds. Within the main hospital there was a ward set aside for 'mental disease', and another for tuberculosis; there was also a sizeable dental department. The surgical side was mostly concerned with accidents and associated injuries, but there were also wards specialising in ophthalmology and otology; while the venereal wards were said to 'afford a wide field for the study of that class of disease'. One of the nine pavilions was subdivided into single rooms, reserved for the treatment of officers.

During the Second World War over 86,000 patients passed through RNH Chatham – more than through any other naval hospital. At the start of the war there were concerns about the safety of the hospital, due to its proximity to London and the Thames Estuary (not to mention being less than a mile away from Chatham's Royal Dockyard). Preparations involved covering over 8,000 windows in the wards, departments and residences, plus 2,700 panes of glass in the main corridor, and the construction of underground shelters in the grounds. Although bombs fell close by, the hospital remained undamaged throughout the war.

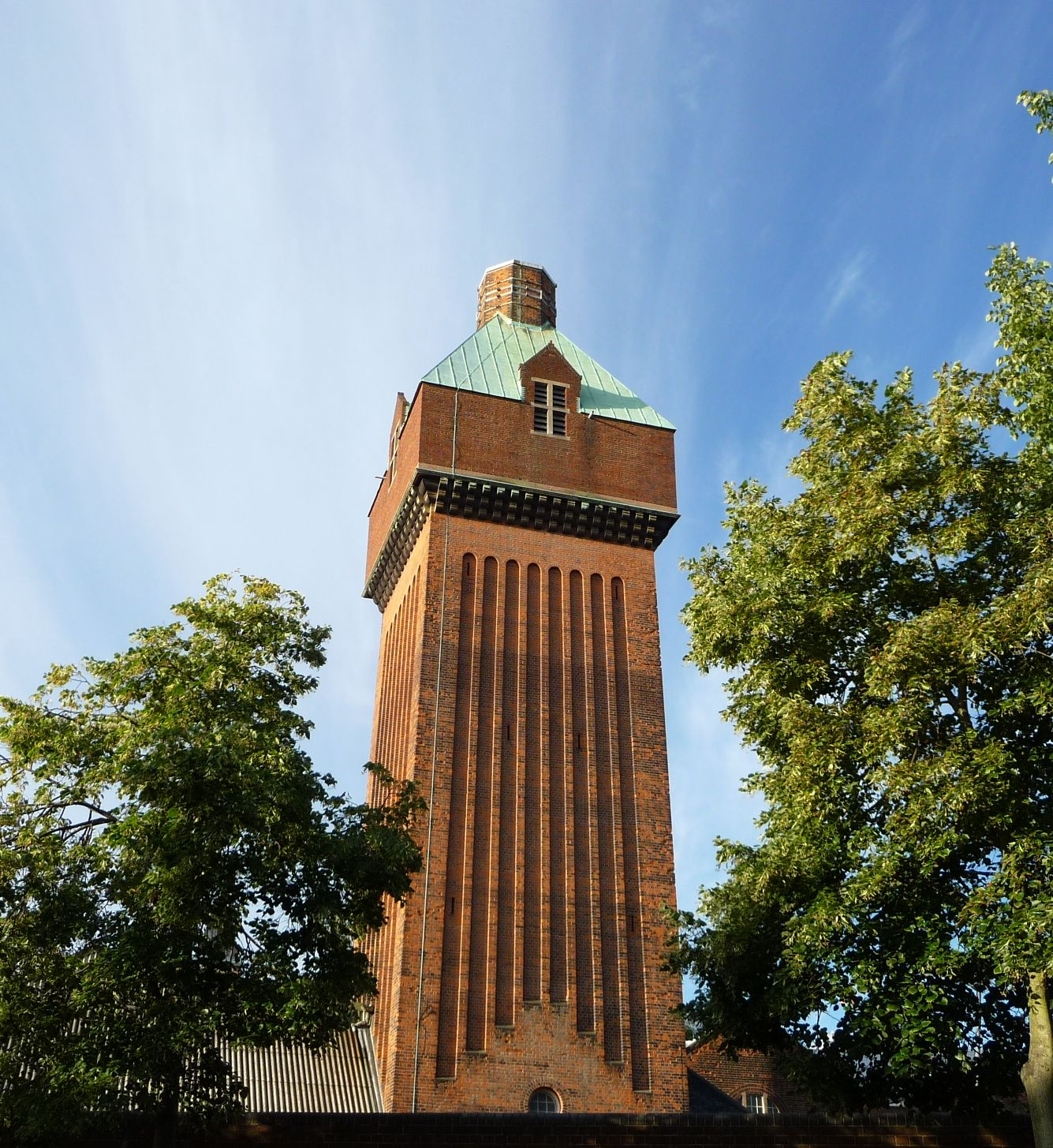
The combined water tower and chimney remains a significant local landmark.

In 1958 it was announced that Nore Command was to be abolished; Chatham Dockyard would remain open, but the RN Barracks would close, and with it 'other naval establishments'. In December 1960 the Civil Lord of the Admiralty confirmed that RNH Chatham would cease to be used as a naval hospital on 1 April 1961 (the day after the dissolution of Nore Command), whereupon it would be handed over to the Minister of Health.

=== Medway Hospital ===
On 1 April 1961 the hospital was duly transferred by the Admiralty to the NHS and became part of the Medway Health Authority. The hospital then closed for modernisation (for which the Ministry of Health had earmarked a sum of £1 million) and after some delays it opened again in 1965 under the name "Medway Hospital". Further expansion followed in 1970, when an orthopaedic block was added, and a new accident and emergency centre was opened.

In the years following the transfer many of the original buildings were removed: by 1985 the chapel, the admin block, the kitchen, the dispensary, the entire infectious division and four of the main pavilion wards had all been demolished. The following year work began on a new complex of buildings in the 'post-modern' style, by architects Hutchison, Locke & Monk, part of a £31 million upgrade. The new 'A block', containing services for the elderly and mental health care, opened in 1990.

=== Medway Maritime Hospital ===
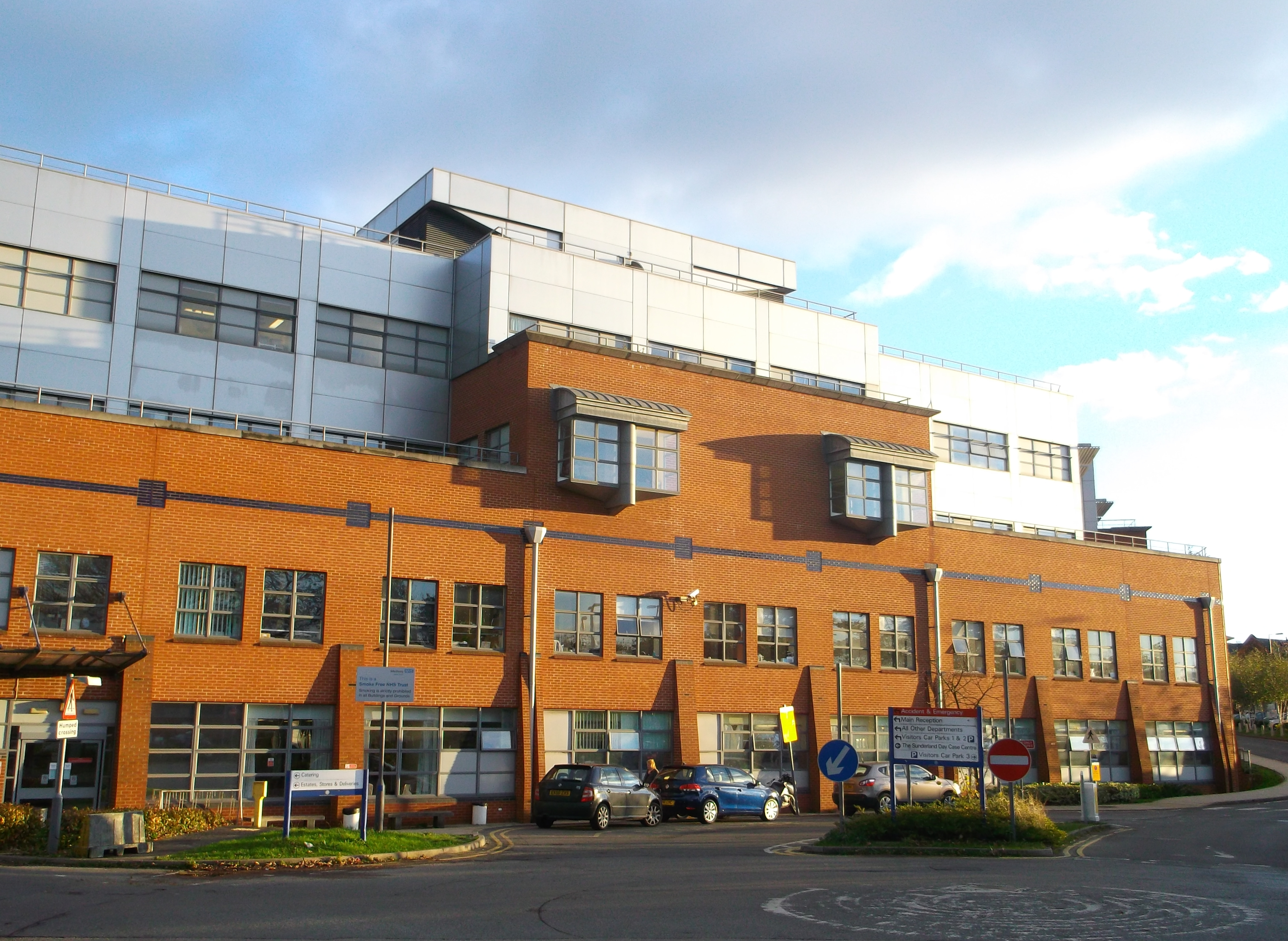
One of the newer buildings on the site.

As part of a £60 million development in 1999 the hospital doubled in size and services were transferred from neighbouring hospitals St Bartholomew's in Rochester and All Saints' in Chatham. That same year it changed its name to "Medway Maritime Hospital". Since then the hospital has continued to expand; a new £11.5 million Accident and Emergency department was opened in 2018.

Three of the original pavilion blocks from the old hospital have been retained (along with the water tower, clock tower, laundry buildings and a number of residences).

==== The Piano Man ====
An unidentified man who became known as "Piano Man" was treated at Medway Hospital during April 2005. The man was found wandering the streets in Sheerness, wearing a soaking wet suit and tie. Despite many attempts to communicate with him, he remained silent. When given a pen and paper he drew a grand piano. When taken to a piano in the hospital chapel, it was reported he played classical music non-stop for four hours, however this was not the case as hospital staff afterwards stated he just played with the piano like someone with no training. After four months he revealed his identity as Andreas Grassl from Bavaria, and he returned home.

== See also ==
- Healthcare in Kent
- List of hospitals in England
