= Royal Marine Barracks, Chatham =

Royal Marine Barracks, Chatham
- Chatham, Kent
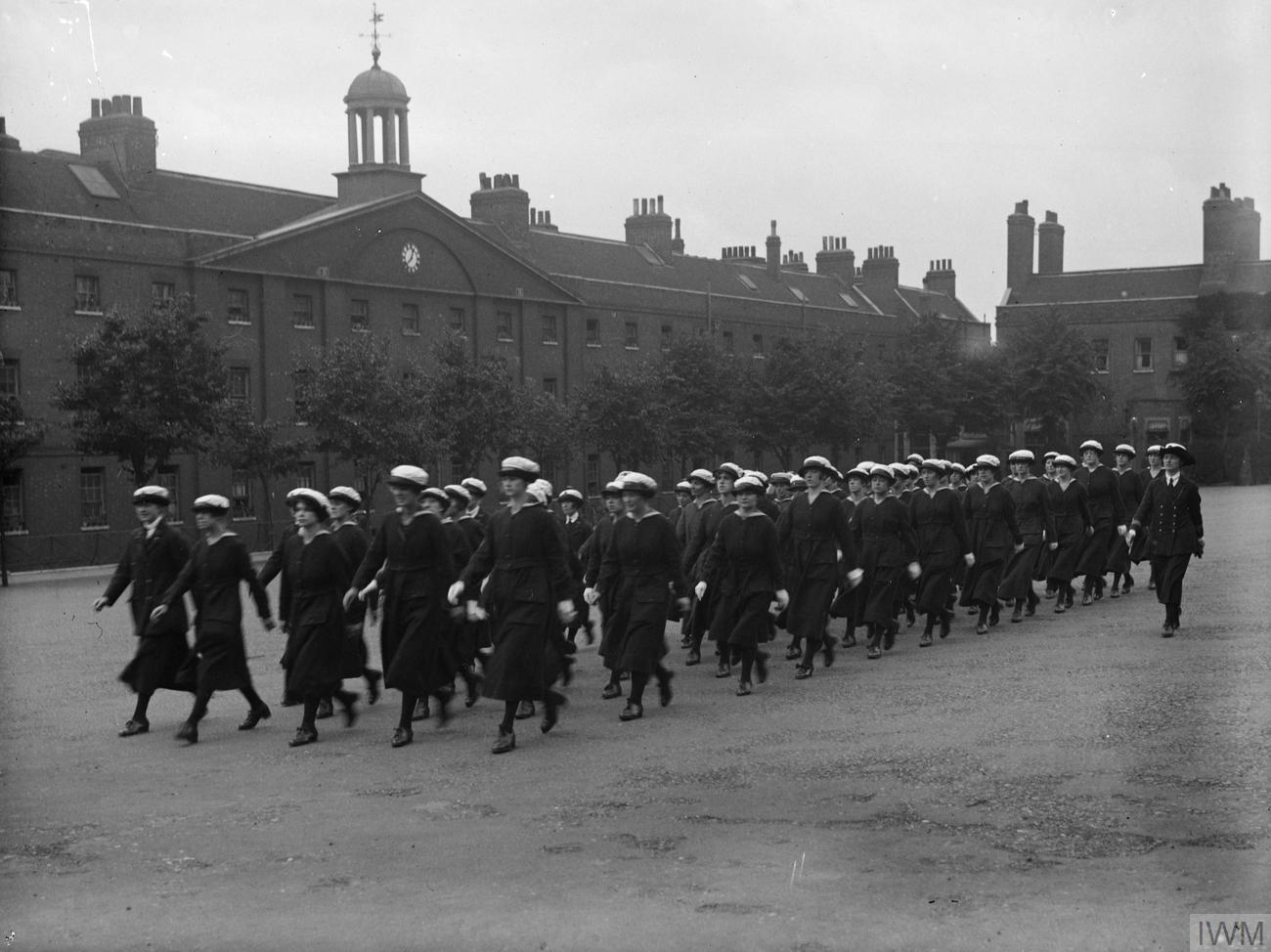
- WRNS officers and ratings drilling at the Royal Marine Barracks, Chatham

Site information
- Type: Royal Marines Base

Location
- Location within Kent
- Coordinates: 51.388°N 0.5245°E

Site history
- Built: 1779
- Built for: Admiralty
- In use: 1779-1950

Garrison information
- Occupants: Chatham Division, Royal Marines

The Royal Marine Barracks, Chatham was a military installation occupied by the Royal Marines and located at the Gun Wharf at Chatham in Kent. The barracks were situated immediately to the south of the Dockyard, just above the Ordnance Wharf. The barracks were closed in 1950 and demolished in 1960.

== History ==
While there was a Royal Marine presence at Chatham Dockyard during the eighteen century, no barracks were available to house them, marines often being billeted at local inns and hotels. After an Admiralty decision in 1764 to provide accommodation for 500 marines, a site adjacent to the Gun Wharf (to the west) and the Dockyard (to the north) was purchased in 1777, with buildings completed and first occupied by the Royal Marines on 2 September 1779. Hill House (which had served as lodgings for the Navy Board and as the principal administrative building of the Dockyard from the sixteenth to the early eighteenth century) was demolished to make way for the barracks. The site was bounded by two alleyways: one to the north, running along the southern boundary of the Dockyard, which led from the road to the 'New Stairs' at the riverside; and the other to the south, named Church or Cat Lane.

Accommodation was in back-to-back barrack rooms, each accommodating 16 men, heated by a central stove (which originally was also used for cooking). The main barracks quadrangle was described in the 1850s: 'On entering the gate, the visitor sees a very elegant parallelogram, one side of which has a railing between it and the road; the two ends are occupied by officers' quarters, and the opposite side by a range of building, being the men's barrack'. Externally the three blocks were of similar appearance, each presenting a uniform front to the parade ground with windows equally spaced, and topped by a shallow roof behind a parapet. (The long range was later refashioned with a central pediment and clock). Behind the men's barrack the ground fell away towards the river (meaning that the building was of three storeys in front but four storeys to the rear). The rear of the building faced on to 'a narrower parallelogram, on the other side of which is a long narrow building, chiefly for store rooms' (originally this area contained just a simple wash room and privies). As originally built the barracks included an infirmary, outside the quadrangle (alongside the road at the south-east corner of the site); there was also a separate house for the Barrack-Master to the south-west, and a 'sutling house' linked to the officers' quarters to the north.

The barracks were expanded considerably in the 1860s: the area to the south of Cat Lane, between the barracks and St Mary's Churchyard, was purchased and levelled off. The main barracks block was extended south as far as the new boundary, and a new block was built to form the southern end of the (now elongated) parade ground. Opposite the main block, backing on to the road, new quarters for Warrant Officers were added. At the opposite end of the site, to the north, a separate area of land was purchased from the Dockyard. This was used for a new range of officers' quarters, fronting on to the main road, which were built in 1867. The area behind was used for tennis courts and a rackets court, and in 1879 a 292-seat theatre, known as The Globe, was built here; it was used for lectures, concert parties and plays. By February 1894 a total of 7 officers and 1,049 non-commissioned officers and men were quartered there.

=== Melville Hospital ===
Between 1827 and 1828 a new Royal Marine Infirmary was built, across the road from the barracks, to the design of George Ledwell Taylor. Built of brick and stucco, the hospital consisted of three parallel ward blocks linked in front by a covered walkway behind a colonnade. A pair of smaller blocks, in the space between the wards, contained a chapel and operating house on the one side, and a cook house on the other. When opened the infirmary had beds for around 230 patients; its first chief medical officer was Dr (later Sir) John Richardson. While officially gazetted in the Navy List as the 'Royal Marine Infirmary, Chatham', it was usually known locally as the Melville Hospital after Viscount Melville (who had been First Lord of the Admiralty at the time the hospital was opened).

In front of the hospital was a 'spacious lawn' used as an airing ground for the patients; behind, set back from the hospital, was a terrace of houses for the principal officers. On higher ground to the north was the hospital reservoir, into which fresh water was pumped from a deep well in the dockyard to provide a steady supply (not only for the hospital itself but also for the barracks and for houses in the Dockyard). The hospital grounds were entered through a gateway on the east side, flanked by a guard house, porter's lodge and offices; on the west side a dispensary was built, alongside other ancillary buildings.

From the time of its opening the Melville Hospital had admitted naval personnel as well as Royal Marines (previously the former had been taken care of in a hospital ship moored on the river, latterly HMS Argonaut had fulfilled this duty). There were, however, comparatively few Royal Navy personnel at Chatham at that time, as it was by then primarily a building yard rather than a base for the fleet.

Later in the century the infirmary took on more naval work, and in 1885 it was redesignated as a Royal Naval Hospital (and duly listed as "Royal Hospital, Chatham" in the Navy List).

By the end of the century it was widely acknowledged that the Melville Hospital did not have the capacity adequately to serve the growing numbers of naval personnel in Chatham. Following the opening of a new Royal Naval Barracks (HMS Pembroke) in 1902, a new Royal Naval Hospital, Chatham was opened on Chatham Hill, Gillingham in 1905; that same year, the Melville Hospital closed.

==== Melville Barracks ====
Following the closure of Melville Hospital, its buildings were taken over by the Royal Marines and converted into additional barracks accommodation. After a period of reconstruction, it reopened with the name Melville Barracks in 1906.

=== Closure ===
The Royal Marine Barracks remained in use until 1950 when the Chatham Group, Royal Marines was disbanded. In 1959 the entire Marine Barracks were sold (together with the adjacent Naval Gunwharf) to William Palfrey Ltd (a packaging company) for redevelopment. The Royal Marine Barracks were demolished in 1960; the site of the barracks was subsequently sold to Lloyd's of London who built new offices there, which were later acquired by Medway Council for their main offices and car park.

After the Marine Barracks had closed, in 1950, the adjacent Melville Barracks continued to house parts of the Royal Marines Pay and Records Office until 1960, when the barracks were closed. Melville Barracks were sold to Chatham Council that same year and the buildings demolished. The site of Melville Barracks was developed as council housing and is now known as Melville Court.
