= Redcliffe-Maud Report =

1969 proposed English local government reorganisation

The Redcliffe-Maud Report (Cmnd.4040) was a 1969 command paper report from the Royal Commission on Local Government in England, under the chairmanship of Lord Redcliffe-Maud. The commission was formed in 1966 to examine the structure of local government in England outside of Greater London, and the 1969 report recommended a radical restructuring of councils in England. Its recommendations were broadly accepted by the Labour government, but the Conservative Party and the rural district councils opposed the plan and the report was set aside following the Conservatives' victory in the 1970 general election.

== Terms of reference and membership ==
The commission was appointed on 7 June 1966, with the following terms of reference:

"....to consider the structure of Local Government in England, outside Greater London, in relation to its existing functions; and to make recommendations for authorities and boundaries, and for functions and their division, having regard to the size and character of areas in which these can be most effectively exercised and the need to sustain a viable system of local democracy; and to report."

The members of the commission were Redcliffe-Maud (chairman), John Eveleigh Bolton (vice-chairman), Derek Senior, Sir James William Francis Hill, Victor Grayson Hardie Feather, Arthur Hedley Marshall, Peter Mursell, John Laurence Longland, Reginald Charles Wallis, Thomas Dan Smith and Dame Evelyn Adelaide Sharp.

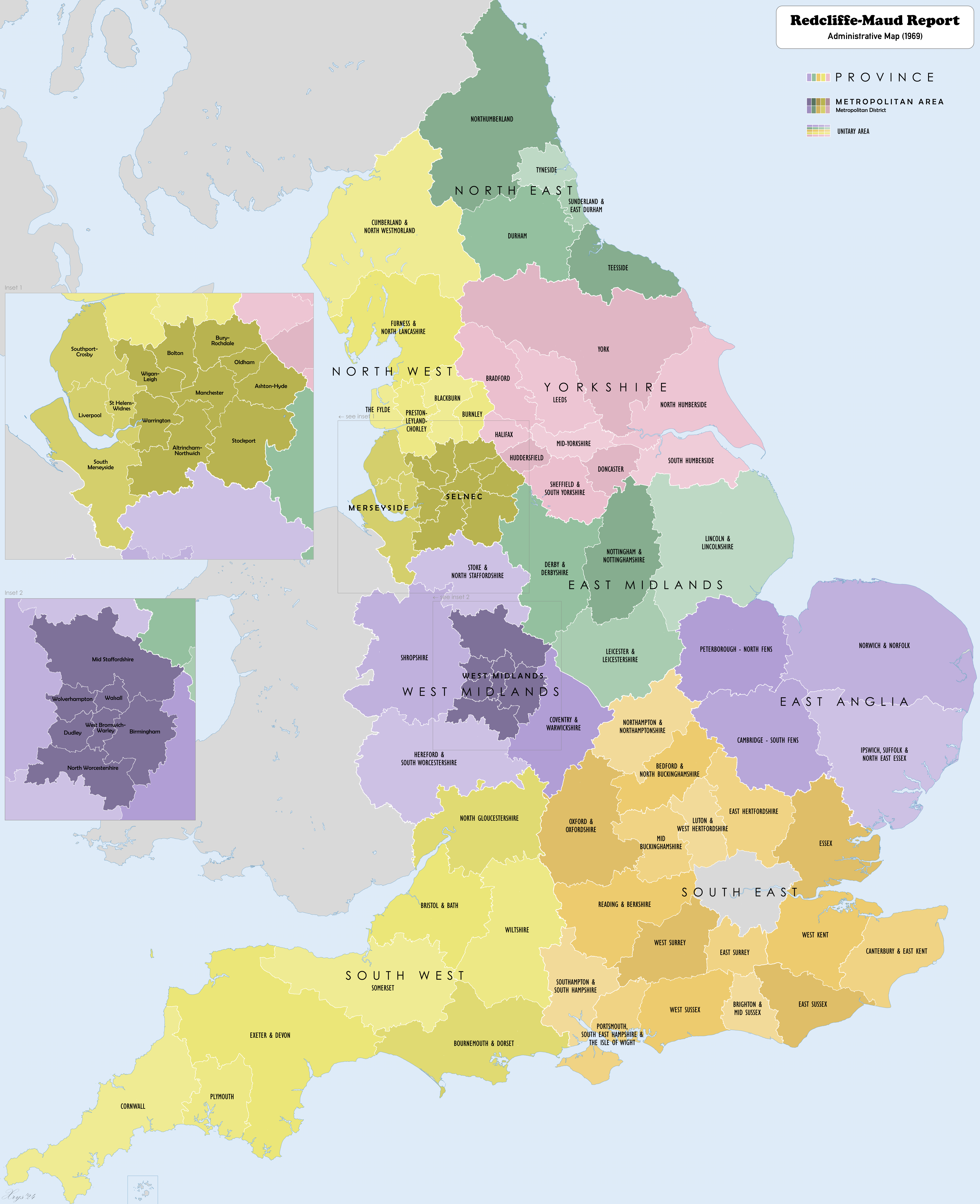
Local government in England as proposed by the report

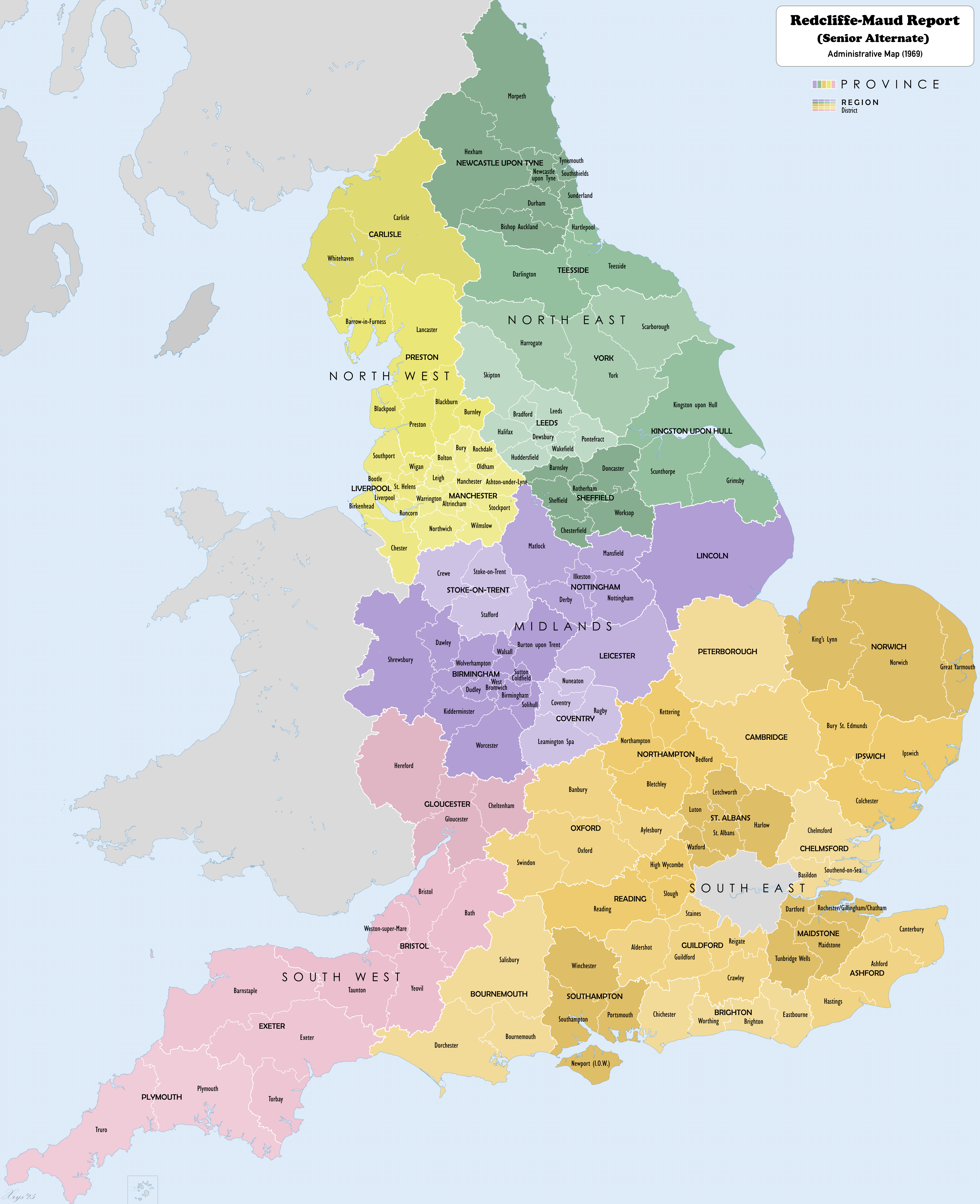
Alternate Local government in England as proposed by Derek Senior

== Report findings ==
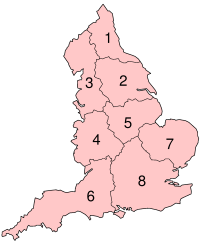
The proposed provinces of the Redcliffe-Maud Report

Broadly the report recommended the abolition of all existing county, county borough, borough, urban district and rural district councils, which had been created at the end of the 19th century, and replacing them with new unitary authorities. These new unitary authorities were largely based on major towns, which acted as regional employment, commercial, social and recreational centres and took into account local transport infrastructure and travel patterns.

There were to be 58 new unitary authorities and three metropolitan areas (Merseyside; South East Lancashire/North East Cheshire or 'Selnec'; and West Midlands), which were to be sub-divided into lower tier metropolitan districts. These new authorities, along with Greater London, were to be grouped into eight provinces, each with its own provincial council.

=== Division of functions ===
In arriving at their recommendations, the commissioners were guided by a number of principles which they had themselves devised. These included:

- Town and country are interdependent, therefore the separate administration of urban areas and their rural hinterlands should cease.
- "Physical environment services" should be in the hands of a single authority. Examples of these services included planning and transport. To provide these wide area services, the authority should have boundaries that reflected geographical patterns of population and movement and provided a coherent area of administration.
- "Personal services" should likewise be administered by a single council. These included education, social services, health and housing. The optimum population range over which to provide these services was 250,000 to 1,000,000.
- Wherever possible, both types of services should be in the hands of a single unitary authority.
- Areas for the new authorities should be capable of being effectively and democratically administered by a single council.

Accordingly, the different categories of council would have the following powers and responsibilities:

- Provincial councils: Drawing up of strategic development plans. They were to take over the functions of the existing regional economic planning councils.
- Unitary area councils: Both physical environment and personal services
- Metropolitan area councils: Planning, transport and general housing policy.
- Metropolitan district councils: Education and personal social services.

=== Local councils ===
It had originally been envisaged that parish councils should also be abolished, but the Secretary of the National Association of Parish Councils (NACP), Charles Arnold-Baker, convinced the commission that they should be preserved.

=== Derek Senior's memorandum of dissent ===
The commission was nearly unanimous, with some reservations as to the exact geographic details. One member of the commission, Derek Senior, dissented entirely from the proposals, and put forward his own in a memorandum of dissent (Cmnd. 4040-I), which was slightly larger than the report itself. He would have preferred a two-tier system, with 35 city-regions of varying size, along with 148 districts. These were to be further grouped into five provinces. At a lower level, there would be 'common councils', roughly equivalent to civil parish councils, which would also cover communities within large towns; special arrangements were to be made for the area surrounding Berwick-upon-Tweed. These proposals effectively ignored traditional boundaries, to a much greater extent than the Report itself did.

== Reaction ==
Immediately after the report was published, the Prime Minister, Harold Wilson, said that he accepted the recommendations "in principle" and committed the government to "press ahead quickly" on the legislation necessary to implement it, later clarifying that legislation would probably follow in the 1970–71 or 1971–72 parliamentary session. The Labour Party Government issued a white paper entitled "Reform of Local Government in England" (Cmnd 4276) in February 1970, broadly accepting the recommendations of the report. The Government had however added two new metropolitan areas: West Yorkshire (with the five Bradford/Leeds/Halifax/Huddersfield/Mid-Yorkshire unitaries as districts), and South Hampshire based on the Southampton and Portsmouth unitaries, with the Isle of Wight being a separate district.

Observers felt that the Conservative Party, then in opposition, had no urgency in defining their position. The shadow spokesman Peter Walker did not commit himself but instead held a series of regional conferences to ascertain party grassroots opinion. Reports suggested these conferences were overwhelmingly hostile and the Conservative Party conference in 1969 passed a highly critical motion, while suggesting that some reform of local government was supported. Walker decided that a future Conservative government could not implement Redcliffe-Maud, but refused to disown the report completely.

The Rural District Councils Association was immediately opposed to the proposals which would see their members subsumed in much larger authorities. They started a national campaign with the slogan "Don't Vote for R.E. Mote" (with Mr R.E. Mote depicted as an insensitive bureaucrat), distributing material to all their members. The slogan was used on postal franking from the affected authorities. Swale Rural District Council was forced to opt out of the campaign due to the similarity of "R.E. Mote" with the local Conservative prospective parliamentary candidate R.D. Moate. By coincidence, Moate had moved the motion opposing Redcliffe-Maud at the Conservative Party conference.

== New government ==
When the Conservatives won the 1970 general election, they did so on a manifesto committed to a two-tier system in local government. In 1971 a further white paper entitled "Local Government in England: Government Proposals for Reorganisation" (Cmnd 4584) announced its intentions, which ultimately led to the 1974 re-organisation. Although the general plan of the report was abandoned, many of the specific innovations were carried over, such as the plan to associate Slough with Berkshire, and Bournemouth with Dorset.

== Aftermath ==
In the actual 1974 re-organisation, the three metropolitan areas became metropolitan counties, though their area was greatly reduced. A further three were added, covering the Leeds/Bradford area (West Yorkshire), the Sheffield/Rotherham area (South Yorkshire) and the Tyneside area (Tyne and Wear). The concept of authorities based around Bristol (Avon), and Teesside (Cleveland) was also retained. In most areas though, the 1974 system was far more conservative and retained more traditional boundaries.

In 2004 the Government put forward a proposal to introduce directly-elected regional assemblies in the three regions of Northern England, should referendums produce a 'yes' vote (in the event the first region voted 'no' overwhelmingly, and the other referendums were abandoned). The regional boundaries proposed were very similar to the three northern Redcliffe-Maud provinces. Associated with this reform would have been a move to wholly unitary local government in the affected regions. In the area of Cumbria and Lancashire, the proposals bore a striking resemblance to the ones in the Report.

The situation of wholly two-tier government did not last. The county councils for the metropolitan counties were abolished in 1986 by Margaret Thatcher's government, making the metropolitan boroughs effectively into unitary authorities. Reforms in 1995–1998, 2009, and 2019–2023 created additional unitary authorities from some parts of the non-metropolitan counties.

The remaining two-tier authorities are due to be replaced by unitary authorities in 2027 and 2028.

== Proposed unitary and metropolitan areas ==
Province	Number	Unitary / metropolitan area	Metropolitan district	Approximate extent
North East	1	Northumberland		non-metropolitan Northumberland
North East	2	Tyneside		Tyne and Wear minus Sunderland
North East	3	Durham		ceremonial County Durham minus Easington
North East	4	Sunderland & East Durham		Sunderland and Easington
North East	5	Teesside		former non-metropolitan county of Cleveland plus Whitby etc.
Yorkshire	6	York		non-metropolitan North Yorkshire and York minus Harrogate, Craven, Whitby
Yorkshire	7	Bradford		Bradford, Craven
Yorkshire	8	Leeds		Leeds, Harrogate
Yorkshire	9	Halifax		Calderdale
Yorkshire	10	Huddersfield		Kirklees minus the north-eastern area around Batley and Dewsbury
Yorkshire	11	Mid Yorkshire		Wakefield plus bordering areas of Kirklees such as Batley and Dewsbury
Yorkshire	12	Sheffield & South Yorkshire		Sheffield, Rotherham, Barnsley plus the Dronfield area of Derbyshire
Yorkshire	13	Doncaster		Doncaster
Yorkshire	14	North Humberside		ceremonial county of East Riding of Yorkshire, small part of North Yorkshire
Yorkshire	15	South Humberside		North Lincolnshire and North East Lincolnshire
North West	16	Cumberland & North Westmorland		Carlisle, former Cumberland, area around Appleby in Westmorland
North West	17	Furness & North Lancashire		Barrow-in-Furness, South Lakeland and Lancaster
North West	18	The Fylde		Blackpool, Fylde, Wyre
North West	19	Preston-Leyland-Chorley		Preston, South Ribble, Chorley
North West	20	Blackburn		Blackburn with Darwen, Hyndburn, Ribble Valley
North West	21	Burnley		Burnley, Pendle, Rossendale
North West	22	Merseyside Metropolitan Area	Southport-Crosby (Today’s West Lancashire borough except the wards of Dalton, Hilldale, Parbold, and Wrightington), and today's Sefton district, except Bootle County Borough); Liverpool (The county boroughs of Liverpool, and Bootle, The urban districts of Kirkby, and Huyton with Roby, and the parishes of Hale, Halewood, Knowsley, and Tarbock); St Helens-Widnes (Today's St Helens district except Newton le Willows; Widnes municipal borough, Runcorn urban district, and the parishes of Sutton, Prescot, Whiston, and Cronton); South Merseyside (Today's Wirral district, the 2009 district of Ellesmere Port and Neston, the 2009 district of Chester, and the Vale Royal parishes of Frodsham, Helsby, Kingsley, Alvanley, Manley, and Norley)	Liverpool City Region combined authority except Newton le Willows, Daresbury, and Moore Most of West Lancashire borough Most of Cheshire West and Chester
North West	23	Selnec Metropolitan Area	Wigan-Leigh (district of Wigan except Up Holland, and the parishes of Dalton, Parbold, and Wrightington); Bolton (district of Bolton, plus part of Blackburn with Darwen); Bury-Rochdale (districts of Bury and Rochdale); Warrington (district of Warrington, Newton-le-Willows and part of Vale Royal); Manchester (district of Manchester, district of Salford, Trafford excluding Altrincham.); Oldham (district of Oldham); Altrincham-Northwich (southern part of district of Trafford, Vale Royal and western part of Macclesfield); Stockport (district of Stockport, eastern part of Macclesfield and adjacent areas of Derbyshire); Ashton-Hyde (district of Tameside, plus areas around Glossop)	Greater Manchester, plus the northern part of Cheshire.
West Midlands	24	Stoke & North Staffordshire		Stoke-on-Trent, Newcastle-under-Lyme, Staffordshire Moorlands, Stafford, East Staffordshire, Congleton and Crewe and Nantwich
West Midlands	25	West Midlands Metropolitan Area	Mid-Staffordshire ( the districts of Tamworth, Lichfield, Cannock Chase, the northern part of South Staffordshire and the area around Stafford); Wolverhampton (as current district, plus the middle part of South Staffordshire); Walsall (as current district); Dudley (as current district except Halesowen, plus southern part of South Staffordshire; West Bromwich-Warley (the district of Sandwell plus Halesowen); Birmingham (as current district plus Solihull); North Worcestershire (the districts of Wyre Forest, Bromsgrove, Redditch)	County of West Midlands, excluding Coventry, plus Wyre Forest, Bromsgrove, Redditch, Tamworth, Litchfield, South Staffordshire, Cannock Chase and the area around Stafford.
West Midlands	26	Shropshire		Shropshire (including Telford and Wrekin)
West Midlands	27	Hereford & South Worcestershire		Herefordshire and southern Worcestershire, excluding the districts of Wyre Forest, Bromsgrove and Redditch
West Midlands	28	Coventry & Warwickshire		Warwickshire including Coventry
East Midlands	29	Derby & Derbyshire		Derbyshire minus Dronfield and Glossop plus Burton upon Trent
East Midlands	30	Nottingham & Nottinghamshire		Nottinghamshire
East Midlands	31	Leicester & Leicestershire		Leicestershire, and most of Rutland
East Midlands	32	Lincoln and Lincolnshire		non-metropolitan county except for South Holland and the areas around Bourne and Stamford
South West	33	Cornwall		Cornwall minus Saltash and area
South West	34	Plymouth		Plymouth, the southern half of West Devon, the western part of South Hams and the area around Saltash in Cornwall
South West	35	Exeter & Devon		Devon except the southern half of West Devon and the western part of South Hams
South West	36	Somerset		non-metropolitan county of Somerset except the area around Frome
South West	37	Bristol & Bath		the former county of Avon, plus the adjacent parts of Wiltshire and the area around Frome
South West	38	North Gloucestershire		the non-metropolitan county of Gloucestershire
South West	39	Wiltshire		ceremonial county of Wiltshire except the northern part of West Wiltshire and the western part of North Wiltshire
South West	40	Bournemouth & Dorset		the ceremonial county of Dorset except the area around Sherborne, plus the western half of New Forest
East Anglia	41	Peterborough – North Fens		the districts of Peterborough, Fenland and South Holland, plus the areas around Bourne, Stamford, Oundle and Ramsey
East Anglia	42	Cambridge – South Fens		the districts of Cambridge, East Cambridgeshire and South Cambridgeshire, plus the areas around Newmarket, Saffron Walden, Haverhill, Royston, Huntingdon and St. Ives
East Anglia	43	Norwich & Norfolk		Norfolk, except a small area to the west, plus the district of Waveney
East Anglia	44	Ipswich, Suffolk & North East Essex		Suffolk except the areas around Newmarket and Haverhill, plus the districts of Colchester, Tendring and the northern part of Braintree
South East	45	Oxford & Oxfordshire		non-metropolitan Oxfordshire minus Henley-on-Thames, plus Brackley
South East	46	Northampton & Northamptonshire		non-metropolitan Northamptonshire minus the areas around Brackley and Oundle
South East	47	Bedford & North Buckinghamshire		Bedford and Milton Keynes, plus the areas around Buckingham and Ampthill
South East	48	Mid-Buckinghamshire		Chiltern and Wycombe plus the areas around Aylesbury and Tring
South East	49	Luton & West Hertfordshire		Dacorum except Tring, St Albans, Watford, Three Rivers, Hertsmere except Potters Bar, Luton and South Bedfordshire
South East	50	East Hertfordshire		Broxbourne, East Hertfordshire, Welwyn Hatfield, Stevenage, Harlow, North Hertfordshire except Royston, the western halves of Epping Forest and Uttlesford and the areas around Biggleswade and Sandy
South East	51	Essex		ceremonial county of Essex minus Colchester, Harlow and Tendring, the western areas of Epping Forest and Uttlesford and the area around Saffron Walden
South East	52	Reading & Berkshire		non-metropolitan Berkshire plus Henley and the southern part of Buckinghamshire
South East	53	West Surrey		Spelthorne, Elmbridge, Runnymede, Surrey Heath, Woking, Guildford, Waverley, Rushmoor, Hart and the northern part of East Hampshire
South East	54	East Surrey		Epsom and Ewell, Mole Valley, Reigate and Banstead, Tandridge and Crawley
South East	55	West Kent		the western half of the current ceremonial county
South East	56	Canterbury & East Kent		the eastern half of the current ceremonial county
South East	57	Southampton & South Hampshire		the districts of Southampton, Eastleigh, Test Valley, part of Winchester and the eastern part of New Forest
South East	58	Portsmouth, South East Hampshire and Isle of Wight		the Isle of Wight, the districts of Fareham, Gosport, Portsmouth, Havant and the southern parts of Winchester and East Hampshire
South East	59	West Sussex		Arun, Adur, Chichester, Horsham and Worthing
South East	60	Brighton & Mid-Sussex		Brighton and Hove, Mid Sussex and Lewes
South East	61	East Sussex		Eastbourne, Hastings, Rother and Wealden

Greater London was outside the scope of the report, having been reorganised in 1965 under the London Government Act 1963.
