= The Queen's Award for Enterprise: International Trade (Export) (2018) =

The Queen's Award for Enterprise: International Trade (Export) (2018) was awarded on 20 April 2018, by Queen Elizabeth II.

The following organisations were awarded this year.

== Recipients ==
- AC Plc of Marston Moretaine for the supply and installation of specialist flooring, roofing and cladding projects for commercial buildings
- Activinsights Ltd of Kimbolton for GENEActiv wrist-worn raw data accelerometer for research. Activinsights Band professional lifestyle analysis wearable
- Addmaster (UK) Ltd of Stafford for technically innovative additives for polymers, paper, textiles and paints, helping manufacturers add value to products
- ADEY Innovation LLPADEY Professional Heating Solutions of Cheltenham for design and manufacture of magnetic filters and chemicals to protect domestic and commercial heating systems
- Airline Component Services Ltd of Braintree for ACS sell, exchange and loan Aircraft parts to supply international airlines with parts and services
- Alexander Mann Solutions Ltd of London for outsourcing and consulting solutions to help companies build world-class talent and resourcing capabilities
- Artemida Pharma Ltd of Stevenage for optimised strategic drug development to start-up and biopharma in UK and Internationally
- A-SAFE of Halifax for the world's first fixed polymer safety barrier system
- Astro Lighting Holdings Ltd of Harlow for design, engineer and manufacture contemporary lighting for high end domestic and hospitality markets
- Audio Network Ltd of London for craft and publish world-class & authentic music commissioned in the UK for worldwide distribution
- Baird and Co Ltd t/a Bairdmint of London for offer full range of precious metal bars and ingots (80+ products)
- Bamboo Distribution Ltd of Waltham Abbey for provide international recycling, fulfilment and distribution services in the Telecoms Sector. (Mobile Handsets, Tablets)
- BECK MBI Ltd of Chessington for interior fit-out and management specialists in museums, science and visitor centres, high-end hotels and residences
- Bellerby & Co. Ltd of London for design and manufacture of bespoke Terrestrial and Celestial World Globes
- Benevo of Havant for development and production of vegan, ethical and eco-friendly pet foods for dogs and cats
- Boyd Consultants Ltd t/a Boyds of Crewe for supporting the development of medicines for patient benefit
- Brandon Medical Company Ltd of Morley for operating theatre lights, theatre control and power systems, pendants, operating tables and medical audio-visual systems
- Brian James Trailers Ltd of Daventry for design and manufacture of trailers
- Bridge of Weir Leather Company Ltd of Bridge of Weir for design and manufacture of finished leather and cut parts for the automotive industry
- Brose Ltd of Exhall for design & manufacture of seating structures and window regulators for the automotive industry
- Cambridge Integrated Circuits Ltd of Cambridge for development and sale of integrated circuits for the contactless measurement of position inside machines
- Cast Iron Radiators Ltd of Scarborough for cast Iron Radiators, Period Valves and associated accessories
- Celtic Sheepskin & Co Ltd t/a Celtic & Co. of Newquay for design, manufacture and retail of sheepskin footwear. Design and retail of natural-fibre clothing
- Central Wire Industries UK Ltd of Rotherham for production of round and profile wire in stainless steel and nickel based alloys
- CFC Underwriting Ltd of London for sell commercial insurance policies, focusing on emerging risk, niche markets and specialty lines
- Cheeky Chompers Ltd of Roslin for design and manufacture in the UK, innovative baby products to help make parents lives easier
- Childrensalon Ltd of Tunbridge Wells for online retailer for luxury designer childrenswear
- Cobra Biologics Ltd of Newcastle under Lyme for the contract development and manufacture of biologics and pharmaceuticals for clinical trials and commercial supply
- Cocogreen (UK) Ltd of Manchester for the leading brand of speciality coir substrates for edible crops
- Cokebusters Ltd of Chester for mechanical Decoking & Tube Inspection; high technology engineering services for oil refinery furnace tubes
- Coombe Castle International Ltd of Melksham for export speciality Cheese, Cream & Butter around the world sharing the best British produce
- Counterline Ltd of Prescot for design and manufacture of bespoke and standard food service counters and displays
- CPR Global Tech Ltd of Swansea for manufacture and distribution of call blocking technology for landline and mobile telephones
- Create Technologies Ltd, t/a Createc of Cockermouth for applied research and development in smart sensing. Manufacture of innovative industrial inspection tools
- Darktrace Ltd of Cambridge for enterprise Immune System technology for cyber security, powered by machine learning and advanced AI algorithms
- Dart Flyscreens Ltd of London for design and manufacture of small motorcycle windshields
- DCA Design International Ltd of Warwick for multidisciplinary product design consultancy across ‘Medical and Scientific’, ‘Consumer’, ‘Commercial and Industrial’ and ‘Transport’ sectors
- Delta DiagnosticsElucigene Diagnostics of Manchester for design, manufacture and selling of in-vitro diagnostic genetic testing medical devices
- Divelements Ltd t/a SkyDemon of Milborne Port for design of software, maps and information used by pilots throughout Europe to increase safety
- DNAFit Life Sciences Ltd of London for fitness Diet Pro Genetic testing and report that includes information about an individual's nutrition and exercise response
- Durbin of South Harrow for specialist global distribution of Pharmaceuticals, healthcare and relief products
- Eckersley O'Callaghan Ltd of London for structural and façade engineering consultancy (including glass engineering) for construction projects
- EnSilica Ltd of Wokingham for EnSilica designs, develops and supplies complete turn-key chip and systems
- Eskenzi PR Ltd of Barnet for global Tech PR Agency that specialises in cyber-security PR, analyst relations, social media and marketing
- EUDRAC Ltd of Chalgrove for regulatory and pharmacovigilance consultancy services to the pharmaceutical industry
- ExVeritas Ltd of Wrexham for ATEX and IECEx Certification, Site Safety (DSEAR) and QMS Certification, ‘Ex’ Training including CompEx Certification
- FAI Automotive Plc of Leighton Buzzard for development and supply of high-quality aftermarket engine and chassis components for passenger and light commercial vehicles
- Firmdale Holdings Ltd t/a Firmdale Hotels of London for luxury hotels including apartments, restaurants, bars, event spaces, cinemas, bath products and other home accessories
- Forsyths Ltd of Rothes for designing, crafting, installing and commissioning of distillation and oil & gas equipment
- Fortress Interlocks Ltd of Wolverhampton for design and manufacture of safety interlocks to protect people and equipment in industrial applications
- Frog Bikes Ltd of Ascot for design and manufacture of lightweight children's bicycles
- FX Blue LLP of London for design and build of customisable, multi-lingual foreign exchange software applications for global banks and brokers
- GAMA Healthcare Ltd of Watford for developing, manufacturing and distributing innovative infection prevention products for the healthcare industry
- Gate7 Ltd of Gateshead for specialist manufacturer of printed components to the Construction and Agricultural Equipment Market
- George Pragnell Ltd of Stratford Upon Avon for rare natural gemstones handcrafted into jewellery; period jewellery and silver; luxury watches and clocks
- Global Inkjet Systems Ltd of Cambridge for RIP software, electronics, software drivers and ink system components for industrial inkjet printheads
- GO Superfoods Ltd t/a Green Origins & Rainforest Foods of Sheffield for manufacture, private labeling and distribution of bulk superfoods in Rainforest Foods & Green Origins ranges
- Gresham Technologies Plc of London for enterprise data management technology and services for global financial institutions
- Greycon UK Ltd of Battersea for production planning, scheduling and manufacturing of execution systems for roll-based & flat sheet industries
- Hanningfield Process Systems Ltd of Rochford for design, manufacture and installation of pharmaceutical machinery for the handling, processing and containment of powders
- Highclere International Investors LLP of London forinvestment management services to U.S. institutional clients (profit and non-profit)
- Honeycomb Project Management Ltd of Kenley for development and supply of own label and branded high quality food to retail
- HotDocs Ltd of Edinburgh for hotDocs Document Automation Software: a tool kit for creating intelligent templates from repetitive, complex documentation
- Hothouse Partnerships Ltd of Brighouse for UK made personal care brands that are distributed globally
- HPD Software Ltd of Putney for software platforms supported by consultancy, which banks and lenders utilise to deliver working capital finance
- HS Products Ltd t/a Harrison Spinks Components and Spinks Springs of Leeds for design and manufacture of pressure-relieving components and machinery applicable across a range of applications
- Hydro Group Plc of Aberdeen for exporting subsea cables, connectors and cable systems for underwater electrical and fibre optic systems
- Image Processing Techniques Ltd (trading as Omnitek) of Basingstoke for provider of video and image processing IP, Design Services and Test & Measurement equipment
- Innovative Technology Ltd of Oldham for design and manufacture of cash handling equipment: banknote validators, coin hoppers and ticketing solutions
- Intralink Ltd of Abingdon for helping companies enter new export markets and governments promote trade and attract foreign direct investment
- IVORY Worldwide (Holdings) Ltd of London for design, production and delivery of international marketing projects and experiences for the technology industries
- John Packer Ltd of Taunton for sales and rental of brass and woodwind musical instruments
- Jon Tibbs Associates Ltd of Tunbridge Wells for jTA provides strategic brand building and communications consultancy for clients in the international sports movement
- Kestrel Liner Agencies Ltd of Stansted for providing specialist logistical services to niche markets worldwide
- Language Connect International Ltd t/a Language Connect of London for language services including translation, localisation, interpreting, transcription, voiceovers, proofreading and specialist coding in all languages
- Lanzante Ltd of Petersfield for restoration and racing of historic cars. Providing performance engineering solutions for unique cars and exclusive manufacturers
- Laser Wire Solutions Ltd t/a Laser Wire Solutions of Pontypridd for advanced, compact off-the-shelf and bespoke laser wire stripping equipment and wire stripping contract services
- Lattimer Ltd of Southport for design and manufacture of IS spare parts and variable equipment for the glass container industry
- LEW Techniques Ltd of Taunton for manufacture and subcontracting assembly of bespoke submounts, circuits and other miniature packaging components for microelectronics
- Lintbells Ltd of Hitchin for development of pet health supplements for dogs, cats and horses
- Loadbalancer.org Ltd of Portsmouth for development of load balancing solutions that keep applications online and highly available 24/7
- Lucio & Meera SantoroSantoro Licensing of London for brand designer, licensor and manufacturer through appointed licensees of a premium array of merchandise
- Lumishore Ltd of Swansea for design, development and manufacture of high performance underwater LED lighting for leisure marine and superyachts
- Magnetic North Travel Ltd of Wartnaby for tailor made holidays in Scandinavia, the Nordic countries and Canada
- Maritime Zone Solutions Ltd of Romsey for technical advice and services to coastal states for the delineation and management of maritime space
- Mason Advisory Ltd of Salford for provision of independent IT advisory services covering strategy, sourcing, service management, architecture, cybersecurity, and delivery
- Maverick Drinks of Tunbridge Wells for production of multi award-winning British craft spirits: Bathtub Gin, Rumbullion!, Boutiquey Whisky & Gin
- Microlise Ltd of Nottingham for design and manufacture of hardware and software for commercial vehicle operators
- MIRA Technology Park of Nuneaton for providing unique location for international automotive companies to establish a UK technical presence
- My Nametags Ltd of London for the manufacture and sale of iron-on and sticker name tags for labelling children's clothes and equipment
- NCMT Ltd of Thames Ditton for supplying engineering solutions for metal cutting and grinding applications, primarily to aeroengine and land turbine industries
- Netsparker Ltd of Pinner for automated web application security scanner that is available as Windows Software and Online Service
- NextGen Technology Ltd of Wokingham for automated and manual global interoperability system testing and analysis services
- Nosy Crow Ltd of London for child-focused, parent-friendly books and apps for children from 0-14
- Nouveau Lashes Ltd of South Elmsall, Pontefract for a rapidly expanding global brand offering professional award-winning eyelash treatments, products and training
- Oceanair Marine Ltd of Selsey for design and manufacture of blinds and soft furnishings for superyachts, yachts, properties and recreational vehicles
- One Lindens Ltd t/a Cambridge Immerse of Northwood for residential academic summer programmes designed for secondary school students from around the world
- Ossila Ltd of Sheffield for components, equipment and materials enabling faster and smarter discovery in organic electronics and materials science
- Peli BioThermal of Leighton Buzzard for design & manufacture of Temperature Controlled Packaging and services for the Global Life Sciences market
- Pentland Group Plc of London for multi-channel retail and development of global footwear and apparel brands
- Photocentric Ltd of Peterborough for manufacturer of innovative 3D printers, manufacturer of patented photopolymer packs for making stamps
- Prima Dental Manufacturing Ltd of Gloucester for premium precision dental instruments for healthcare and cosmetic markets and the intellectual property for manufacture
- Principle Holdings Ltd of Huddersfield for project Management, our portal Principle Connect, brand components including digital assets, signage and interior fixtures
- PROINSO UK Ltd of Slough for pROINSO is a distribution and integration business with a primary focus on solar energy
- Proseal UK LTD of Adlington for design, manufacture and assembly of tray-sealing machinery and turnkey line solutions for packaging applications
- Protec Technical Ltd of Fareham for provision of Technical Recruitment Services through the supply of permanent and contract staff worldwide
- R & M Electrical Group Ltd of Southampton for supply of Marine, Industrial & Hazardous area electrical equipment. Cables, Lighting, Junction Boxes & Fixings
- Random42 Ltd of London for random42 provides medical animation and virtual reality experiences to the pharmaceutical and biotech industries
- Rarewaves.com Ltd of London for online retail of Entertainment-based products, Music, DVD, Video Games, Books, Gifts, Toys, Gadgets
- Recycling Lives Ltd of Preston for high-quality recycled metals and plastics, produced to pre-approved specifications
- Reid Lifting Ltd of Chepstow for design of lightweight, portable gantry and davit systems for lifting of goods and personnel
- Resilience Communications Ltd of Torpoint for design and manufacture of audio ancillaries that increase the value of communications systems
- Rinicom Ltd of Lancaster for designer and manufacturer of wireless telecommunications radios and civil infrastructure protection technologies
- Rock School Ltd of Teddington for qualifications and supporting texts in all contemporary music disciplines, musical theatre, dance and digital media
- SBD Apparel Ltd of Rotherham for design and manufacture of performance supports and apparel for strength and fitness sports
- Scoliosis SOS Ltd of London for a unique, world-leading UK-based scoliosis clinic, specialising in treating spinal conditions with innovative non-surgical techniques
- SE10 LLP of London for public relations. Internal/external marketing communications. Media relations. Content creation and strategy. Events. Graphic Design
- SendMyBag (NI) Ltd of Bangor for door to door luggage delivery service offering routes within the UK and worldwide
- Silverlining Furniture Group Ltd of Wrexham for design and manufacture of collectible one-of-a kind luxury furniture for yachts and houses
- Simpsons Premium Ltd of Wigan for develop and manufacture wet & dry dog and cat food and dog treats
- Smylie Ltd of Bromborough for fMCG exporter providing the complete export and logistics service
- Solentim Ltd of Wimborne for develops and sells innovative life science products for medical research
- Specac Ltd of Orpington for design and manufacture of accessories for spectrometers for use in science and industry
- Specialist Marine Consultants Ltd of Filey for sMC provides highly skilled and experienced personnel and services to the energy industry
- Swift-Cut Automation Ltd of Burton-on-Trent for cNC plasma cutting tables, CNC Waterjet cutting tables, After-sales consumable parts, service and maintenance contracts
- Tecna Display Ltd of London for design and manufacture of modular display systems for the exhibition and other industries
- Telensa Ltd of Cambridge for wireless streetlight management system and smart city sensor network
- Tellurium Q Ltd of Langport for multi award-winning High End audio cables
- Testhouse Ltd of Docklands for testing Services: Functional Testing, Performance Testing, Test Automation as well as consulting services
- The Company of Animals Ltd of Chertsey for design, manufacture and marketing of Pet training and behaviour products across the world
- The First Class Pet Company Ltd of Worcester for little BigPaw: natural, premium pet food made in the UK with British ingredients
- The Group Company (UK) Ltd of York for tailor-made hotels and itineraries, customised to the exact specification of tour operators and their customers
- The Hut Group Ltd of Rudheath for design & Manufacture of Sport's Nutrition & online-retailing of over 900 brands across Beauty, Health, Entertainment
- The Source (Hastings) Ltd of Hastings for retailing of BMX bikes, BMX parts, Shoes and Clothing
- The TALL Group of Companies of Runcorn for securely printed documents and cheque handling software, including cheques, ballot papers, certificates and cheque scanners
- Thomas Ware and Sons Ltd of Bristol for traditional tanners manufacturing bespoke leathers of the highest quality since 1840
- Tiffany Rose Ltd of Chessington for designers of premium maternity occasion wear and bridal dresses. Made in Britain
- Tom Hartley Jnr Ltd of Swadlincote for worldwide consultant, seller and broker of classic, high-performance and supercars
- TP3 Global Ltd of Redditch for the manufacture and supply globally of Thermal Protective solutions for temperature sensitive freight
- TPS Global Logistics of Aylesford for multimodal worldwide freight forwarding services, distribution and fulfilment, IT, Broadcast and Event Logistics
- TTS Group Ltd of Kirkby-in-Ashfield for unique curriculum resources which can be used across the world by 0-14 year olds
- Turnstyle designs Ltd of Barnstaple for manufacturers of catalogue and bespoke, high end, door, cabinet and window marine hardware
- Twinkl Ltd of Sheffield for educational teaching resources (including printable and digital/online materials)
- Unicorn Mouldings Ltd of Lisburn for designer, manufacturer and distributor of interlocking floor tiles for industrial, commercial and domestic applications
- Virtual Human Resources Ltd of London for global technical recruitment across Aerospace & Aviation, F1 & Motorsport, Engineering & Defence and Marine
- VOSAIO Travel Ltd of London for leisure group tours, Special Interest groups Tours, Religious Tours and Pilgrimages
- Warpaint Cosmetics (2014) Ltd of Iver for design and manufacture of high quality cosmetics at affordable prices
- Welland Power Ltd of Spalding for design and Manufacture of Diesel Generators
- Wild and Wolf Ltd of Bath for wild & Wolf creates design-led gifts and lifestyle products including stationery, homewares, accessories, and toys
- Wooltex UK Ltd of Huddersfield for the design and manufacture of contract upholstery and window blind fabrics for commercial interiors
- Zettlex (UK) Ltd of Cambridge for design and manufacture of sensors for high-accuracy position & speed measurement in extreme environments
- Zone3 Ltd of Guildford for design and manufacture of performance sportswear with a focus on triathlon (swimming-cycling-running)
