= The Forum, Tunbridge Wells =

Music venue

Coordinates: 51°7′37″N 0°15′30″E

Tunbridge Wells Forum
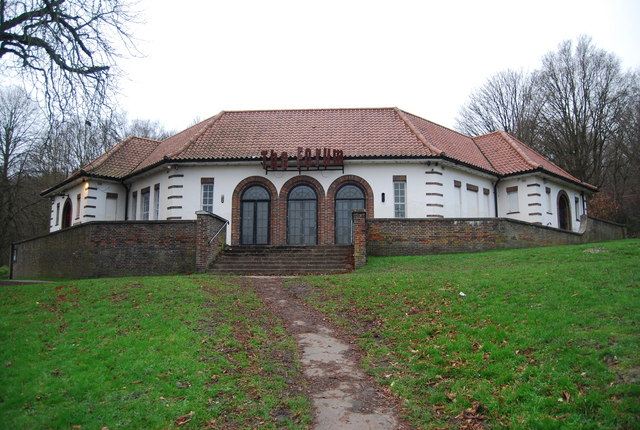
- Tunbridge Wells Forum
- Interactive map of Tunbridge Wells Forum
- Location: Royal Tunbridge Wells, Kent, England, United Kingdom
- Capacity: 250
- Type: Live music, Arts
- Event: indie

Construction
- Opened: 1993 (as a music venue)

Website
- http://www.twforum.co.uk

The Forum is an independent music venue in Royal Tunbridge Wells, Kent, England, with a standing capacity of 250. The venue opened in 1993, the building having previously been a public toilet.

== Location ==
The Forum is located on Tunbridge Wells Common, close to the junction of the A26 London Road and Frant Road, opposite the Church of King Charles the Martyr and The Pantiles. It is approximately five minutes walk from Tunbridge Wells station.

== History ==
The Forum was the brainchild of four friends: Michael Oyarzabal, Peter Hoare, Jason Dormon, and Mark Davyd, two of whom had previously been involved with the Rumble Club, an irregular music event that took place in a variety of locations in Tunbridge Wells during the period 1988 to 1992 – bringing bands such as The Boo Radleys, Lush and Green Day to the area. It was the success of The Rumble Club that prompted them to seek a permanent location for their own venue.

The Forum opened as a new music venue in January 1993 in a building on Tunbridge Wells Common which had been built as a public cold bath and was subsequently a public toilet and then a brass rubbing centre. It has since hosted a number of acts who have gone on to achieve significant commercial success.

In 2007, The Forum produced a parody of the cover of Sgt. Pepper's Lonely Hearts Club Band, showing a selection of the better known acts that had played at the venue.

In 2010, The Forum and one of its founders Jason Dormon were featured in The Independent's "Happy List", profiling people who make Britain a better place to live.

In 2012, the NME voted the venue as Britain's Best Small Venue.

The Forum has been credited as a key influence by people from the local area who have become successful in the music industry, including Jeremy Pritchard of Everything Everything and Slaves.

== Notable acts ==
Many acts have appeared at The Forum, towards the beginning of careers that saw them go onto significant commercial success. These have included Adele, Biffy Clyro, Coldplay, Ellie Goulding, Green Day, IDLES, The Libertines, Mumford & Sons, Muse, Oasis, Royal Blood, The Vaccines, and Wolf Alice.

In addition, The Forum has been used as a venue for more established acts who are playing warmup or smaller shows. These have included Ash, The Divine Comedy, Enter Shikari, Foals, Frank Turner, Graham Coxon, Keane, and Rag'n'Bone Man.
