= Pantile =

Type of fired roof tile

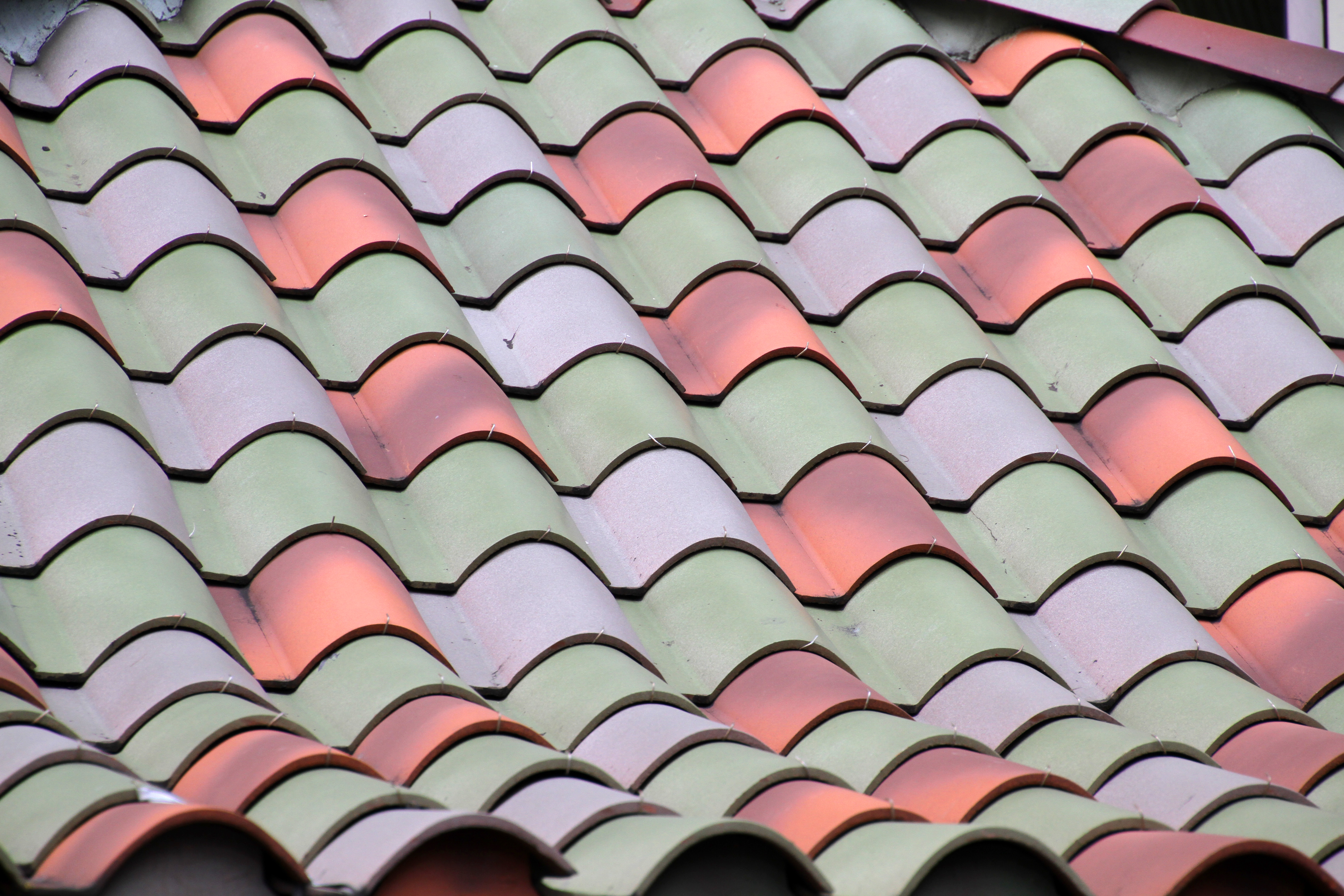
Pantiles in a "Spanish" pattern

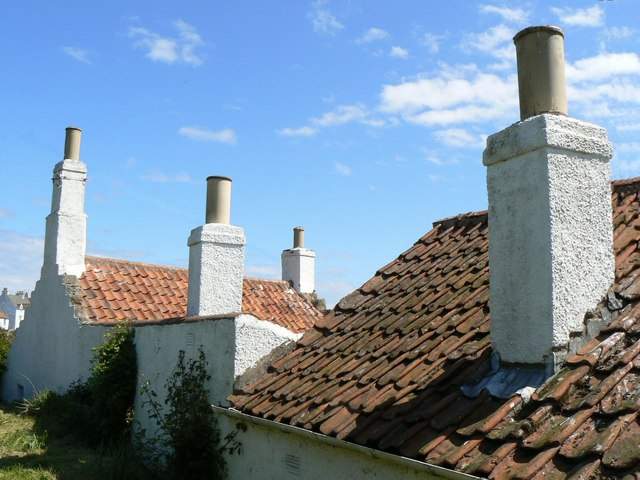
Pantiles on a roof in Crail, Fife

A pantile is a type of fired roof tile, normally made from clay. It is S-shaped in profile and is single lap, meaning that the end of the tile laps only the course immediately below. Flat tiles normally lap two courses.

A pantile-covered roof is considerably lighter than a flat-tiled equivalent and can be laid to a lower pitch.

In Britain, pantiles are found in eastern coastal parts of England and Scotland, including Norfolk, East Yorkshire, County Durham, Perthshire, Angus, Lothian and Fife, where they were first imported from the Netherlands in the early 17th century. They are rarely used in western England or western Scotland, except in Bristol and the Somerset town of Bridgwater.

== In paving ==
Roofing pantiles are not to be confused with the paving tiles also named "pantiles." The Pantiles in Royal Tunbridge Wells is named for the paving tiles installed there in 1699 – one-inch-thick square tiles made from heavy wealden clay, shaped in a wooden pan before firing (hence the name "pan-tiles"). The pantile paving in Tunbridge Wells was replaced with flagstones in 1792.
