= Corn Exchange, Tunbridge Wells =

Commercial building in Royal Tunbridge Wells, Kent, England

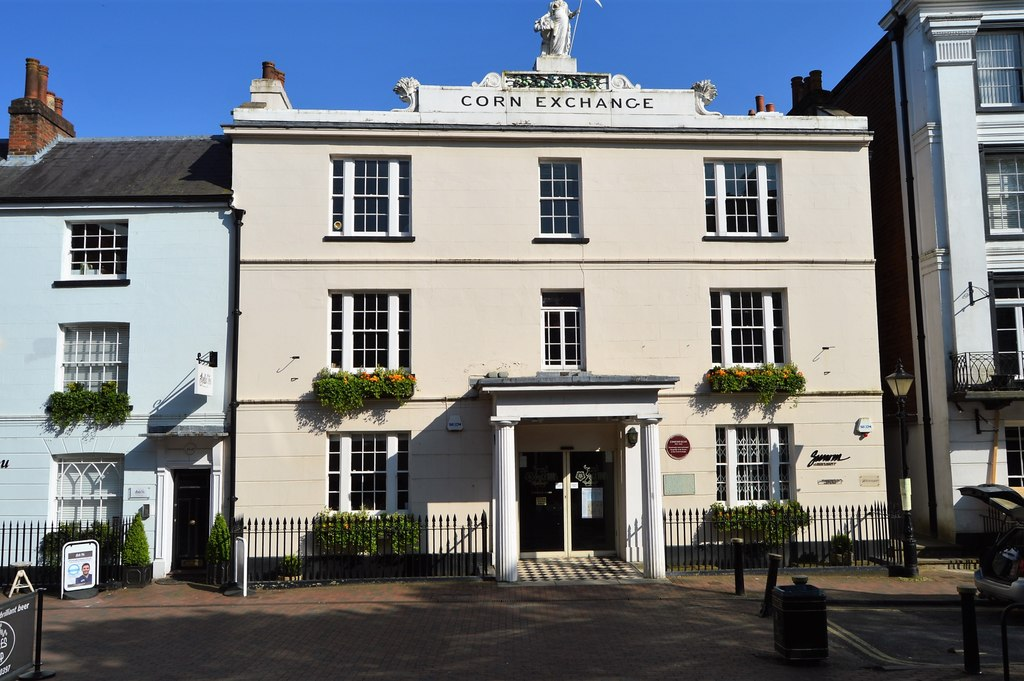
- Corn Exchange, Tunbridge Wells

- Shown in Kent
- 51.1258°N 0.2580°E
- Location: The Pantiles, Royal Tunbridge Wells

History
- Built: 1802

Site notes
- Architectural style: Neoclassical style

Listed Building – Grade II
- Official name: The Corn Exchange
- Designated: 20 May 1952
- Reference no.: 1084438

The Corn Exchange is a commercial building in The Pantiles, Royal Tunbridge Wells, Kent, England. The structure, which is currently used as an antiques and fine art market, is a Grade II listed building.

== History ==
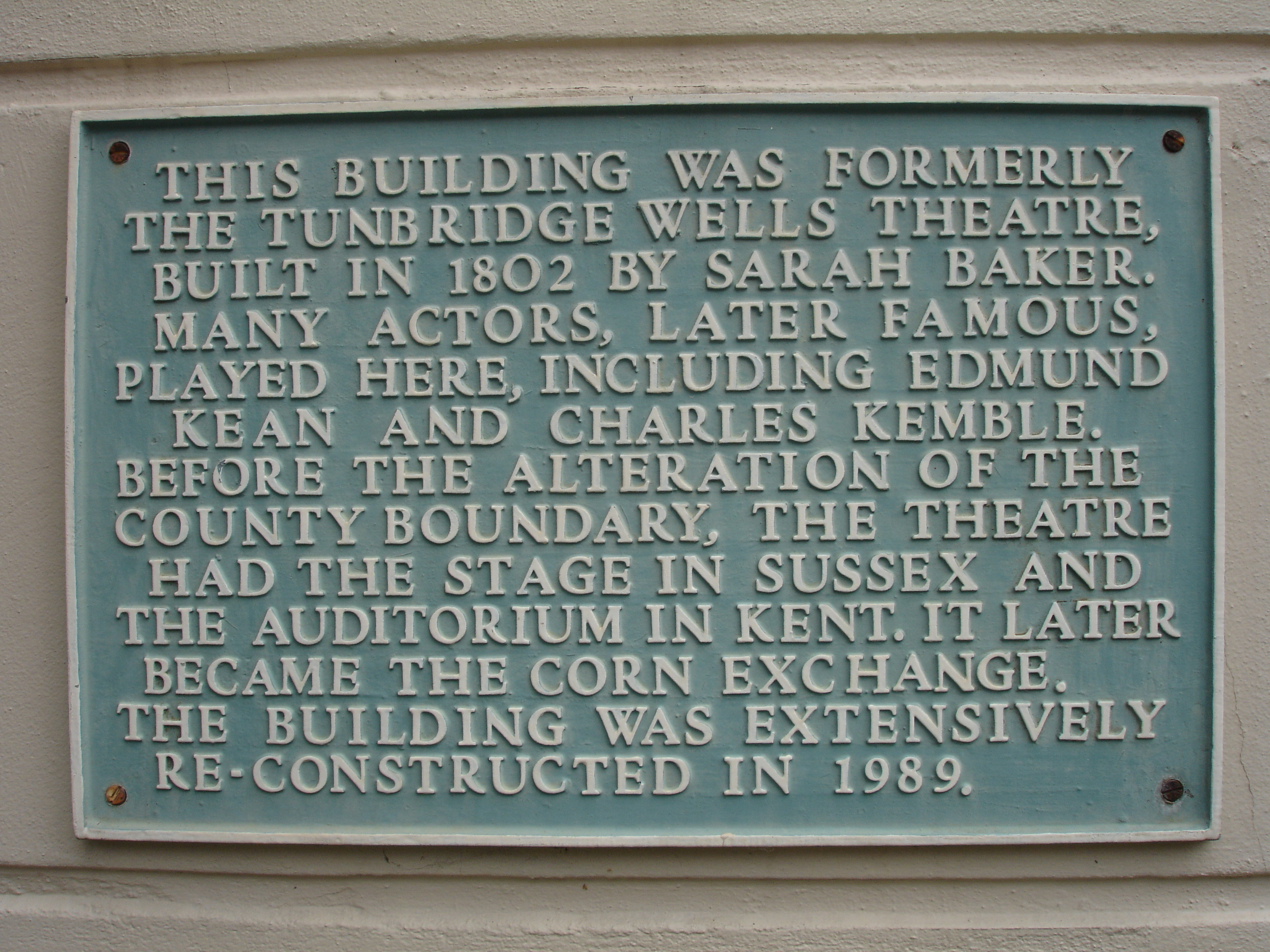
Plaque on the front of the building

The building was commissioned by the theatre manager, Sarah Baker, as the Tunbridge Wells Theatre, in the early 19th century. It was designed in the neoclassical style, built in brick with a stucco finish and was officially opened on 8 July 1802. The design involved a symmetrical main frontage of three bays facing onto The Pantiles. The ground floor was rusticated and the central bay featured a porch formed by two Doric order columns and two Doric order pilasters supporting an entablature and a cornice. The central bay was fenestrated by single sash windows on the first and second floors while the outer bays were fenestrated by tri-partite windows on all three floors. At roof level, there was a cornice and a parapet. The actors Edmund Kean and Charles Kemble both performed on the stage in the building in the first half of the 19th century. After Baker died in 1816, the theatre passed to her son-in-law, William Dowton, but audiences dwindled, and the theatre closed in 1843.

A group of local businessmen then decided to form a company, to be known as the "Tunbridge Wells Corn Exchange Company", to operate the building as a corn exchange: a large panel, inscribed with the words "Corn Exchange", flanked by carvings of wheat sheaves, and surmounted by a statue of the goddess, Ceres, was installed on the roof. After the works had been completed, the building was re-opened by John Nevill, 3rd Earl of Abergavenny, whose seat was at Eridge Park, in November 1844. The use of the building as a corn exchange declined significantly in the wake of the Great Depression of British Agriculture in the late 19th century. The assets of the company were sold and the Tunbridge Wells Corn Exchange Company was placed into liquidation in January 1902.

The building was then used as a drill hall by C Squadron of the Queen's Own West Kent Yeomanry during the First World War. After the war, it became the auction house of a local firm of auctioneers, Carter Banks and Bennett. It remained in the ownership of the Nevil family of Eridge Park until 1939, when it was acquired by Tunbridge Wells Borough Council.

A major programme of refurbishment works costing £1.1 million was completed in 1989, and the building subsequently re-opened as a tourist attraction known as "A Day at the Wells". However, after visitor numbers reduced, the attraction closed in 2004. The building subsequently operated as a small galleria for independent retailers but many of the shops closed within a few years.

In February 2012, Christopher Nevill, 6th Marquess of Abergavenny acquired a series of properties in the Lower Pantiles, including the corn exchange, with a view to carrying out sympathetic redevelopment. Following a further refurbishment, funded by The Hoard Limited the building was reopened as an antiques and fine art centre, known as the "Pantiles Arcade", in July 2021. The building was leased by Yorkshire born businessman Robert Woodmansey who appointed Eric Knowles as non-executive chairman of The Hoard Limited. The auctioneer, Charles Hanson, opened an auction house but was replaced by Mark Hill and his new venture Mark Hill Auctions. The horologist Richard Price also from the antiques roadshow was sub-let a unit in 2023.

== See also ==
- Corn exchanges in England
