= Weald Warriors =

English amateur rugby league club

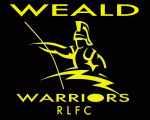

Club information
- Full name: Weald Warriors RLFC
- Colours: Black & Yellow with Cherry Red trim
- Founded: 2012; 13 years ago
- Website: http://www.wealdwarriors.com

Current details
- Ground(s): St. Marks Rec, Royal Tunbridge Wells, Kent
- Competition: RFL London and South East Championship

Weald Warriors RLFC are a rugby league team playing in the London and South East Championship of the Rugby League Conference London & South Division. The club is based in Royal Tunbridge Wells, Kent with players recruited from West Kent and East Sussex.

The club runs two seniors (open age) sides and currently two Academy / Junior sides (under 16 and under 17), all of whom play in black and canary yellow, with cherry red trim.

The club is the current Kent & Sussex Courier Sports Team of the Year (2015) and will host an under 10s - under 15s Summer Camp in July 2016.

== Club history ==
Weald Warriors were founded in 2012 by former Barrow and London Skolars player Anthony Bennett, along with local schoolteacher Tom Phillips, Max Currums and former Northampton Gremlins player Alex Nicholson. Their initial goal was the introduction of rugby league into the West Kent and East Sussex area.

The club's inaugural season in the London and South East Merit League saw them finish 4th in the table. The first competitive game for the club came against Dagenham Bulldogs on 26 May 2012. The club's first try scorer was Anthony Bennett.

In 2013 Earl Gorman became the first Weald Warriors player to gain representative honours, appearing for GB Police RL, whilst a member of the club.

In 2015 Weald Warriors achieved their first silverware, winning the London and South East Cup. They finished the 2015 season as League champions following a play off final win versus Newham Dockers.

In 2016 the club has announced it will run four sides: two open age sides and an Academy side (under 16s to under 18s). The club is affiliated under the TWRFC Ltd umbrella organisation, which sees all home games hosted at St Marks Recreation Ground, home of Tunbridge Wells RFC.

The club has the unique distinction of hosting Royal Tunbridge Wells' first ever competitive game of Rugby League in 2012.

== Honours and awards ==
In 2015, Weald Warriors won the RFL London and South East Cup (The Gordon Anderton Memorial Trophy) beating Newham Dockers 46-18. This was the first silverware for the Weald Warriors.

In 2015, Weald Warriors completed the 'double, by winning the RFL London and South East Championship play off final, again defeating Newham Dockers, by a record 4-84 score line, to be crowned divisional winners.

In recognition of the club's success and development of the game in the Weald area, the club was nominated for Sports Team of the Year in the Courier Media Group Regional Awards 2012. Weald Warriors were awarded 3rd place overall at the awards night held at Lingfield Park on 25 October 2012. In 2015 the club were again nominated following their record breaking wins in the play off final and Regional Cup success. Weald Warriors were awarded 1st place, in the Kent and Sussex Sports Team of the Year category, at a ceremony held at Lingfield Park on 18 January 2016.

== See also ==
- British rugby league system
- Rugby League Conference
- RL Merit League
- Royal Tunbridge Wells
