= I Am Come =

Studio album by Part Chimp
- Released: 2005
- Label: Rock Action Records

Professional ratings
Review scores
Source	Rating
Allmusic	3.5/5 stars

I Am Come is an album by Part Chimp. It was released in 2005 on the Rock Action Records label, most commonly associated with the post-rock band, Mogwai.

== Track listing ==
1. "Båkahatsü" - 1:33
2. "Wår Machine" - 3:21
3. "Hèllo Bastards" - 3:37
4. "Bubbles" - 2:38
5. "Pvnishment Ridè" - 4:45
6. "Bring Back the Sound" - 3:30
7. "Dr. Horse Part Two" - 3:29
8. "Fastø" (Often incorrectly listed as "Fatso") - 3:03
9. "I Am Come" - 4:20
10. "30,000,000,000,000,000 People" - 6:05
11. "Ashita No Båkahatsü" - 3:45
