= Sawyer (band) =

British indie rock band

- Origin: Kirkcaldy, Fife, Scotland
- Genres: Indie rock Rock music
- Years active: 1990–2001
- Labels: Human Condition Records; Earwing
- Members: Iain Hinchliffe - Guitar/Backing Vocals; John Mackie - Vocals; Alan Findlay (Scottish musician) - Drums; Alan Wilson - Bass; Derek Anderson - Guitar
- Past members: Andrew Hunter

Sawyer were a group originally formed in Fife, Scotland in 1990 by John Mackie (vocals), Andrew Hunter (bass), Alan Findlay (drums) & Iain Hinchliffe (guitar). With this line-up they recorded a double 7" single for Human Condition Records of Edinburgh, operated by Jamie Watson (of Chamber Studios).

== History ==
Sawyer were started by Andrew Hunter and John Mackie who then asked Iain Hinchliffe, of Fife band The Schoolhouse, and Alan Findlay, from Silent Falls and Supernova, to get together. After a double 7" EP and a line-up change, replacing Andrew Hunter with Alan Wilson on bass and adding Derek Anderson on guitar, Sawyer recorded an album called On The Seven, also released on Human Condition.

Sawyer went on long-term hiatus in 2000 following guitarist Iain H's move to London for work. Iain H now plays in Part Chimp, Alan Findlay played drums in Mute records artists Foil, Derek Anderson plays in Scotland's premier Police tribute "The Polis" & "Harlot", and Alan Wilson plays guitar in 13 Tombs.

The band members came together again to perform in June 2013, at Electric Circus in Edinburgh, as part of a tribute night to the former venue Cas Rock.

== Discography ==
- Ghetty Chasun (Double 7" ep) (1994) – Human Condition Records
- Air Freshener (Compilation CD) – Earwing Records
- On The Seven (CD) – (2000) Human Condition Records
- Handbags at Dawn (Compilation CD) – Human Condition Records
