= High Rocks =

Geological Site of Special Scientific Interest in England

Coordinates: 51.113°N 0.226°E

- Site of Special Scientific Interest
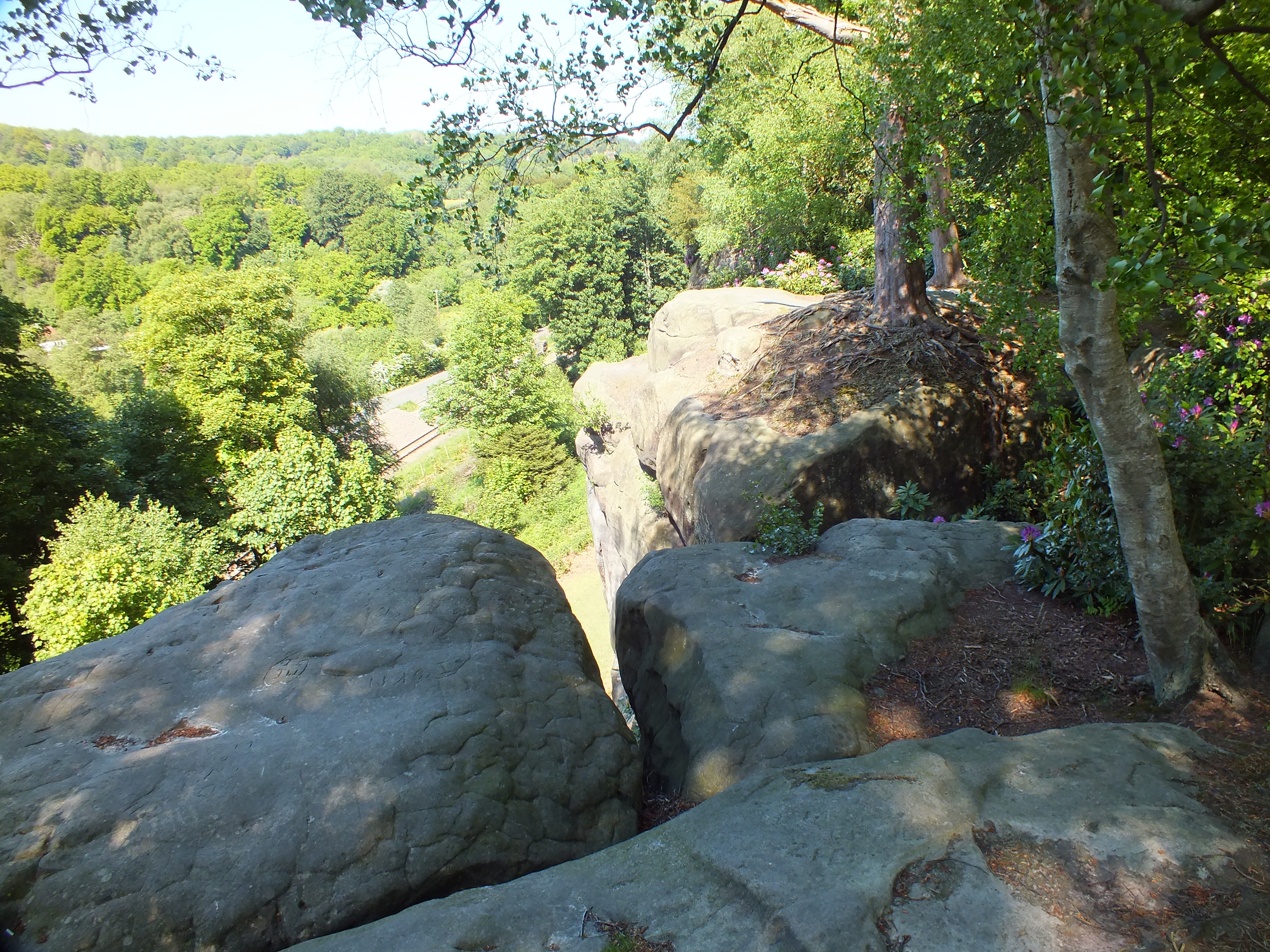
- Location of High Rocks.
- Area of search: East Sussex; Kent
- Grid reference: TQ 559 383
- Interest: Geological
- Area: 3.2 hectares (7.9 acres)
- Notification date: 1986
- Location map: Magic Map

High Rocks is a 3.2-hectare (7.9-acre) geological Site of Special Scientific Interest west of Tunbridge Wells in East Sussex and Kent. It is a Geological Conservation Review site.

== Prehistory ==
The location was formed when a melting ice sheet at the end of the last ice age uncovered hardened silt deposited when the area was part of the Wealden Lake. There are traces of Middle Stone Age and Iron Age residents, including a 1st-century A.D. fort guarding against the Roman invasion.

== Recent history ==
After King James II visited Tunbridge Wells and made the woodland a resort in the 17th century, High Rocks became a tourist attraction which also offered a maze, a bowling green, gambling rooms and cold baths. The Aerial Walk, a series of bridges linking the tops of the crags, was built in the 19th century.

A halt served by the local railway was established in 1907, and was used until 1952. The Spa Valley Railway, a heritage railway, now connects the High Rocks pub beyond the High Rocks turnstiles to Tunbridge Wells, Groombridge and Eridge (on the London-Uckfield line of Southern Railway).

== Geology and geomorphology ==
High Rocks is a key geomorphological site for sandstone weathering features developed on the highest cliffs in the Weald. The Ardingly Sandstone has suffered gentle deformation, and joints have opened out to form spectacular gulls (tension cracks) which are wide enough in places for a person to enter.

Open gulls are comparatively rare in Britain, except in the central Weald, and they are nowhere better revealed than in the numerous open passages at High Rocks. The Ardingly Sandstone is friable and poorly cemented, but the surface develops a protective crust and displays a variety of micro-weathering features, notably honeycombing and polygonal cracking. The origin of this cracking is problematic but may relate to freezing and thawing under periglacial conditions during the Pleistocene. This type of cracking is found in Britain only on the sandstone outcrops in the central Weald, and is most strikingly displayed at High Rocks.

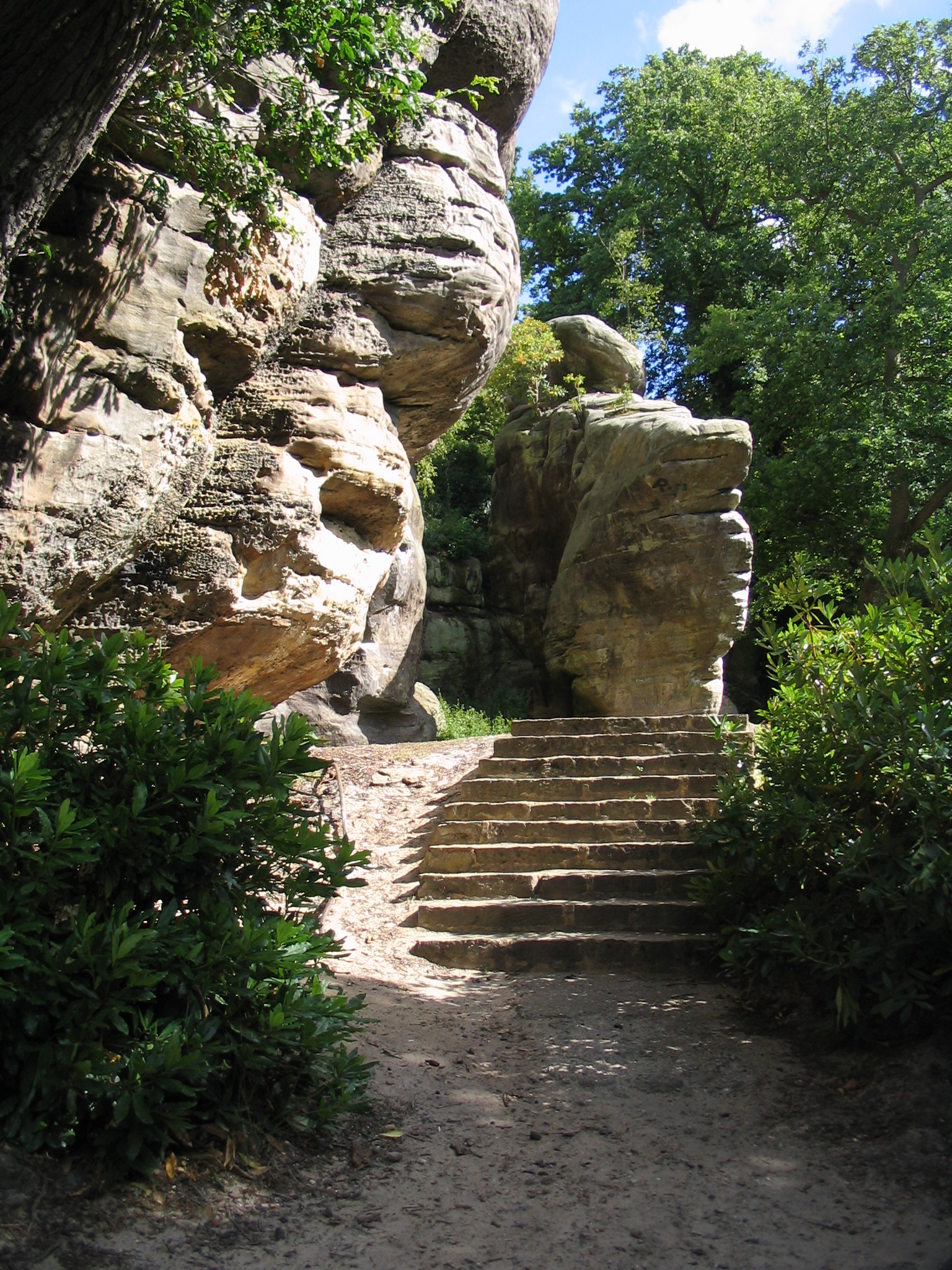
Steps leading up to the Aerial Walk.

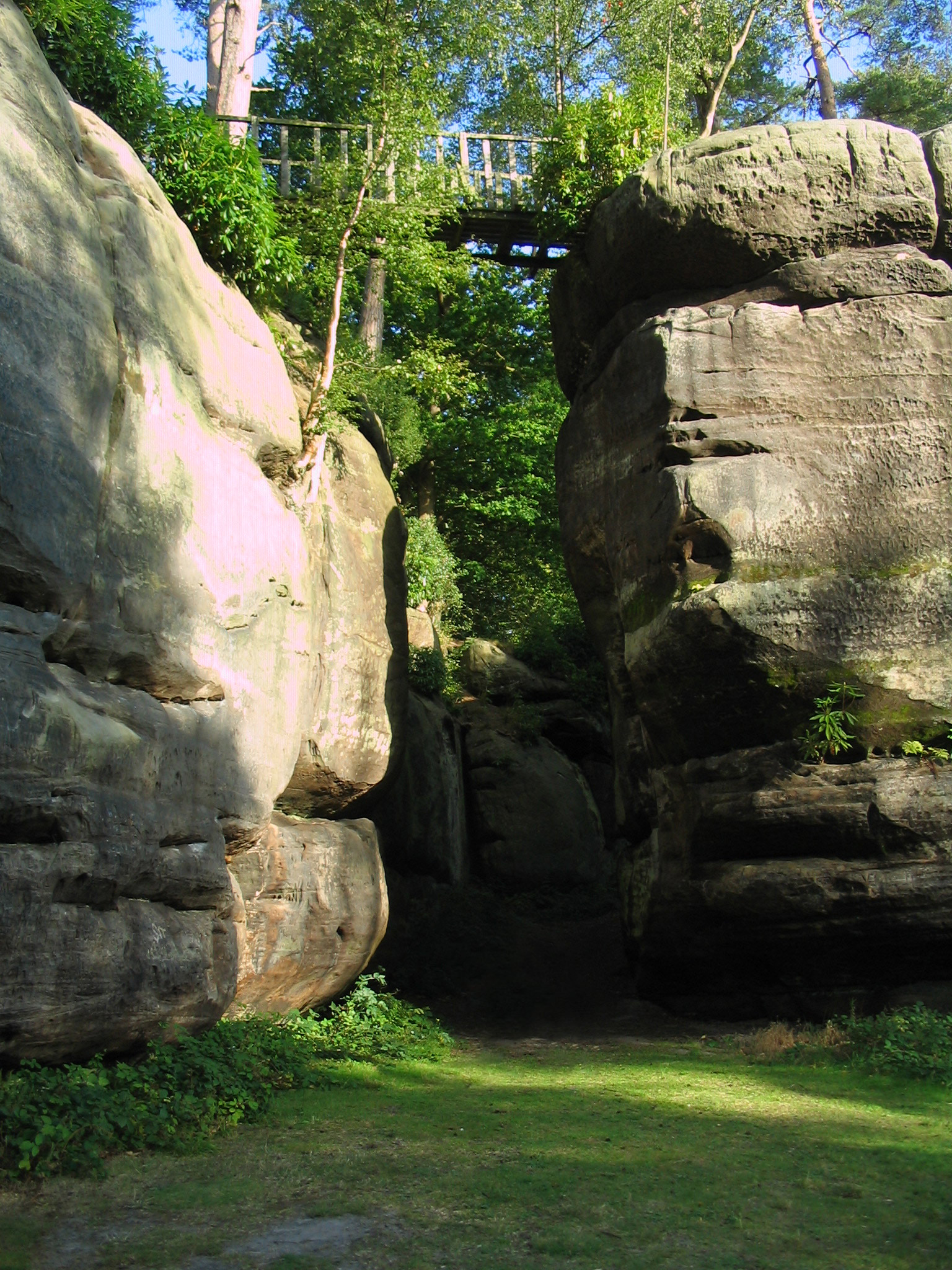
The large chasm and one of the bridges.

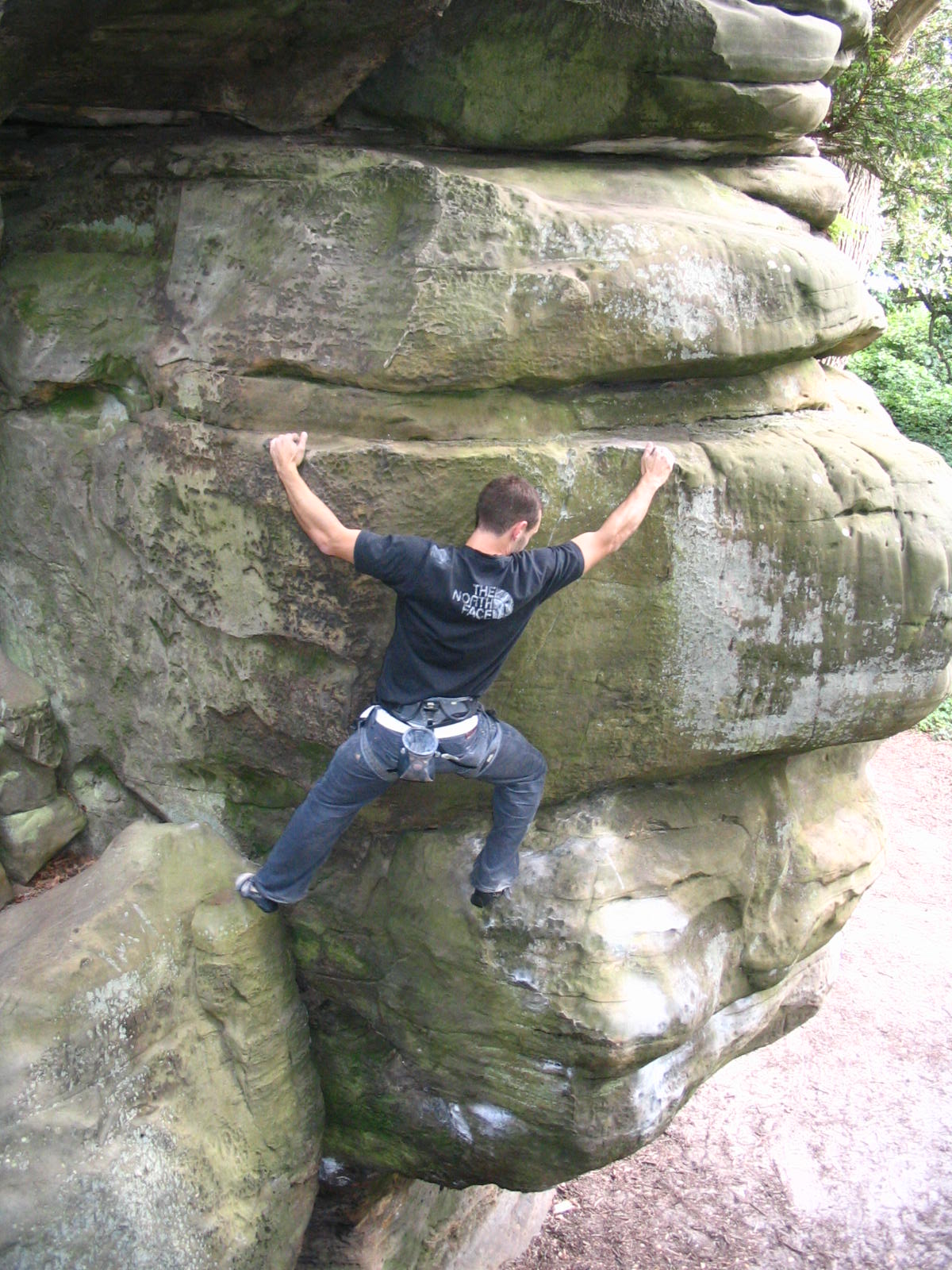
A rock climber scaling a sandstone crag.

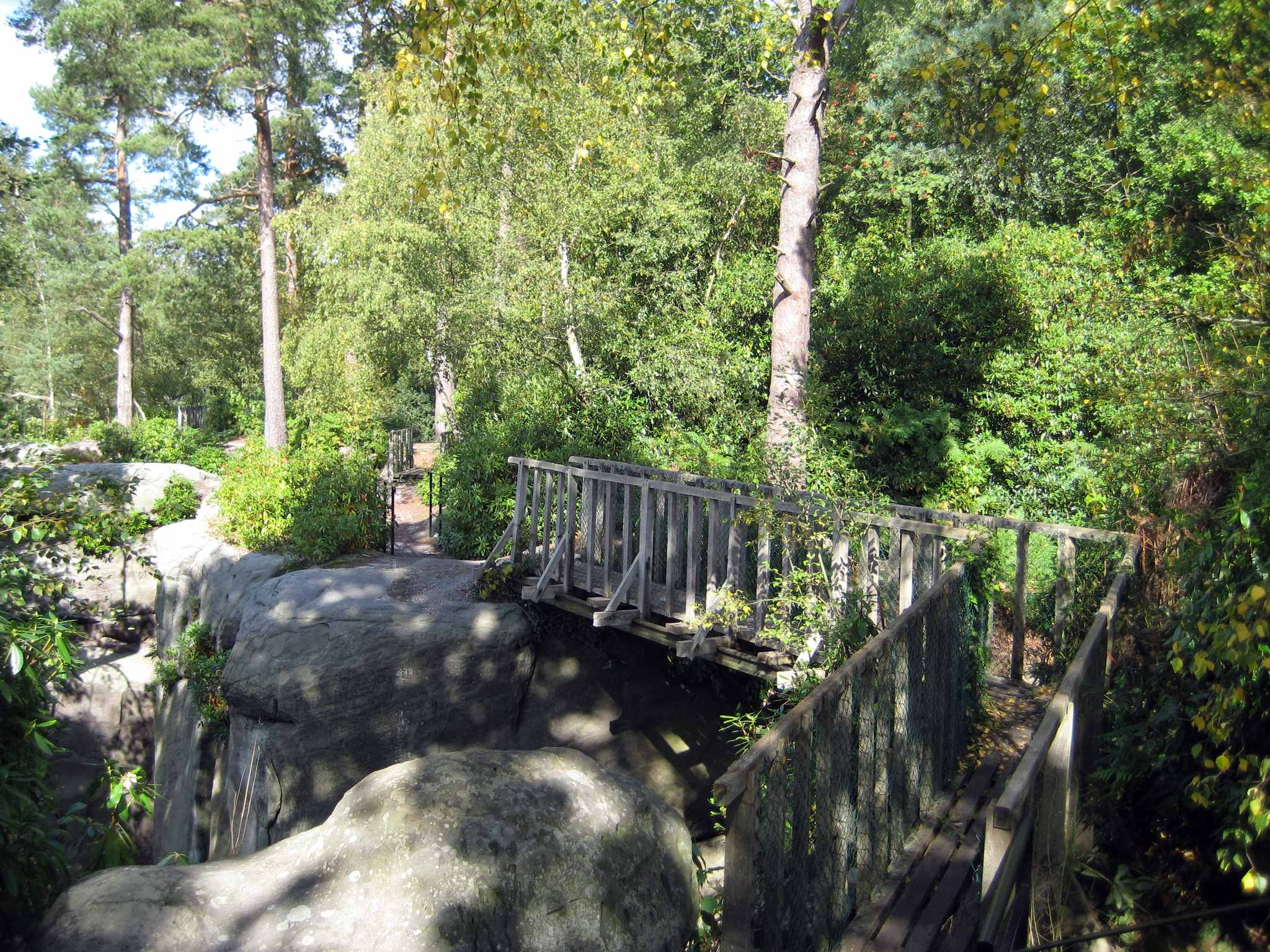
The Crooked Bridge of the Aerial Walk.

== Current use ==
The crags are visited by rock climbers and other members of the public. It is also frequently used for wedding receptions. Footpaths lead around the rocks, and it is possible to walk across the top of crags on footbridges. The main area is fenced in and there is a £7.50 entrance fee (£3 for children) to enter the site.

An unfenced and free access section of the ridge of rock outcrops can be reached by following the public footpath east of the pub, next to the railway bridge.
