= Part Chimp =

British rock band

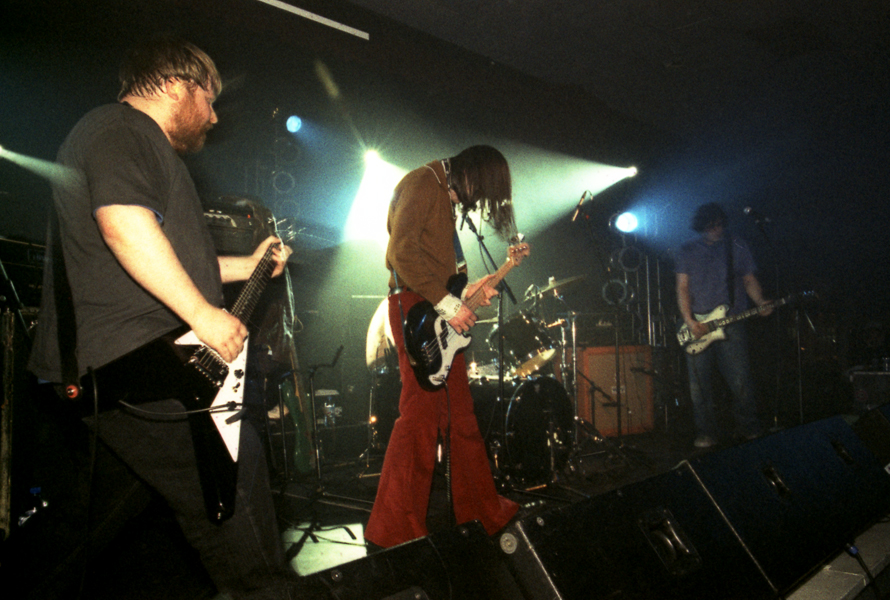
- Part Chimp performing in 2008

Background information
- Origin: Camberwell, London, England
- Genres: Noise rock; sludge metal
- Years active: 2000–2011, 2016–present
- Labels: Rock Action, Gringo
- Members: Tim Cedar; Jon Hamilton; Iain Hinchliffe; Joe McLaughlin; Robin Freeman
- Past members: Tracy Bellaries; Nick Prior

Part Chimp is an English noise rock band from Camberwell, London, that was formed by Tim Cedar, Jon Hamilton and Nick Prior in 2000. Their current line-up is Tim (vocals and guitar), Jon (drums), Joe McLaughlin (bass), Robin Freeman (bass), and Iain Hinchliffe (guitar).

They play rock music with elements of noise. Both in recordings and live performances, Part Chimp have a reputation for sounding extremely loud. Their records have been released in the UK by Rock Action Records, in Europe and Japan by Play It Again Sam, and in the US by Monitor records.

== History ==
Tim Cedar and Jon Hamilton had previously played together in Ligament. Nick Prior (bass), formerly of Scarfo, joined Ligament for their last tour. When Ligament split, the threesome played one show as Part Chimp in late 2000, before adding Iain Hinchliffe on guitar. Nick Prior left the band in February 2004 and was replaced by Joe McLaughlin. In 2008, Tracy Bellaries (ex-Ikara Colt) joined on bass, playing on the Thriller record before leaving in early 2010. After a brief band hiatus, Joe McLaughlin rejoined and played on the Iv lp, Cheap Thriller and the 2021 release Drool alongside touring bassist Robin Freeman.

== Band ==
- Tim Cedar (vocals and guitar) has also played with Ligament, Penthouse (aka Fifty Tons of Black Terror), Sophia, The Loveblobs, Fury Things, Action Swingers, Scarfo, Cass McCombs, Iron Kat, Beardhead, Hey Colossus, Sex Swing, Beef Wellington, and Westminster Brown. He also recorded and produced many other bands at Dropout Studio in Camberwell, which closed down in 2018.
- Jon Hamilton (drums) (aka Hamilton Industry aka Drumm Chimp) has also played with Ligament, Our Lady of Miracles/Vertigo Angels, Tabitha Zu, Shit & Shine, and Th' Faith Healers, and releases solo records as Drumm Chimp.
- Iain Hinchliffe (guitar) has also played with The Schoolhouse, Foil, and Sawyer.
- Joe McLaughlin (bass) also plays with The Left Hand, Kling Klang, The International, and Mono-Poly.
- Robin Freeman (bass, touring) also plays with Hag.

Cedar and Hamilton also play live and record as Die Munch Machine.

== Discography ==
=== Albums ===
- Chart Pimp (2003, 12" LP & CD) – Rock Action Records, Monitor, Play It Again Sam
- I Am Come (2005, 12" LP, CD & Japan only 2xCD) – Rock Action Records, Monitor & Play It Again Sam
- Cup (2007, North American only compilation CD) – Monitor Records
- Thriller (2009, 12" LP & CD) – Rock Action Records, Play It Again Sam
- Reduce To Clear (2009, Live Tour CD) – Cock Ration Records
- Iv (2017, 12" LP & CD) – Rock Action Records
- Cheap Thriller (2018) – Chart Pimp
- Drool (2021) – Wrong Speed Recordings
- Early Chimp (2022) – Chart Pimp

=== Singles ===
- "Bring Back the Sound", 7" & CD single – Rock Action Records
- "War Machine", 7" & CD single – Rock Action Records
- "New Cross", CD single – Rock Action Records
- "Big Bird" / "You Decide", 7" single – Gringo Records

=== Splits and compilations ===
- Part Chimp & Grey Hairs (Split 7" single), God Unknown
- Part Chimp & Joeyfat (Split 7" single), Awkward Silence Recordings
- Part Chimp & Todd (Split 7" single), Noisestar
- A 10 inch of Monstrous Proportions (10", 2006), Rock Action Records, Gringo Records, Southern, Jonson Family – features one songs by Part Chimp, Todd, Lords, & Hey Colossus
- Torche / Part Chimp (Split 12" single), Chunklet Industries
- Up Yours! Punks Not Dead (Mojo Magazine Compilation CD), Mojo
- Rock Sound July 2005 CD (Rock Sound Magazine Compilation CD), Rock Sound
- Rock Action Presents.. (Compilation CD), Rock Action Records
- A Rock Action Sampler (Compilation CD), Plan B Magazine
- Buffalo Bar – Sound Issues (Compilation CD), Buffalo Bar
- Silver Rock SR50 (Compilation CD), Silver Rocket
- Sonic Mook Experiment 3:Hot Shit (Compilation CD), Blast First/Mute
- Un40rmulated (Compilation CD), Unlabel
- S***R Greatest Hits Volume 1 (Compilation CD), SWEAR Shoes
- Wrongpop Presents... A Charity Album In Aid Of CheckEmLads (Compilation Download), Bandcamp
- Baba Yaga's Hut Compilation 2020 (Compilation Download), Bandcamp

== Radio sessions ==
- Peel Session 16 October 2002
- Resonance FM GlassShrimp session 2003
- Peel Session Live Set from ATP recorded 26 March broadcast 30 March 2004
- One Music Session 23 August 2005
- XFM session 20 September 2005
- One World: "The White Album Covers Show – A Tribute to John Lennon" 5 December 2005
- XFM session September/October 2009
- Marc Riley BBC Radio 6 Music Session 12 July 2011
- Marc Riley BBC Radio 6 Music Session 17 May 2017
- Radio X John Kennedy's X-Posure Session 18 April 2018
- Riley & Coe BBC Radio 6 Music Session 04 August 2025
