= Joeyfat =

- Origin: Tunbridge Wells, England
- Genres: Post-hardcore, Indie
- Years active: 1991–present
- Labels: Fierce Panda, Unlabel, Wrong Speed
- Website: joeyfat.co.uk

Joeyfat is a post-hardcore indie music band from Tunbridge Wells, England. Formed in 1991, the band released a number of singles and albums and has been featured on BBC Radio.

== History ==
Joeyfat formed in 1991 in Tunbridge Wells, by Jason Dormon (bass), Matt Cole (vocals), Dave Gamage (guitar), and Jim Booth (drums). The group has been called "melodic hardcore legends", and "supremely talented pioneers of the UK hardcore scene", by Tim Perry writing for The Independent. Punk fanzine Maximum Rocknroll has critiqued their sound as "eclectic, moody, chuggy, bouncy music with fucked up all over vocals". A 1996 gig review by Lee Brown writing for the Dover Express called the band "so incredibly deranged they need an adjective of their own". Alexander Tucker, writing for The Quietus, highlights their music as post-hardcore with leanings towards psychedelic.

In 1992 Joeyfat toured with and supported US band Green Day. In 1995 they joined with bands Scarfo and Ligament to release the 7" record "Suzi Quatro Lives in Chelmsford". This featured the Joeyfat track "Big Dumb Ape" which was called "dynamically fractured and word-conscious" by CMJ magazine. The three groups undertook a joint national tour, under the same name. In c. 1995, the band set up their own record label, Unlabel.

In 1996 the band split up, until in 2000 they reformed. In July 2003 the band performed a Peel Session on BBC Radio 1. That same year they released the album The House of the Fat which received positive critical reception from The Independent newspaper. They were invited back to the BBC for a session on the Radio 6 Marc Riley show, in 2017.

In 2025 record label Wrong Speed Records re-released the groups album The Unwilling Astronaut, and their debut album The House Of The Fat, as part of an attempt to redress the bands relative obscurity which is not commensurate with their significant impact on the contemporary indie music scene.

== Discography ==
=== Singles/EPs ===
- "Suzi Quatro Lives in Chelmsford" (Ligament, Scarfo, and Joeyfat, 1995)
- "Little Big Man" (1995)
- "Split 7"" (Part Chimp and Joeyfat, 2004)

=== Albums ===
- The Unwilling Astronaut (2000)
- The House of the Fat (2003)
- Ye Bloody Flux (2011)
- Suit of Lights (2013)
