= My Nametags =

UK company

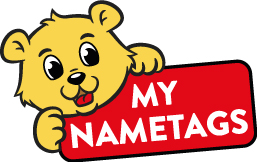
- Company type: Private
- Industry: Consumer Goods
- Founded: 2004; 21 years ago
- Founder: Lars B. Andersen
- Headquarters: London, United Kingdom
- Area served: Worldwide
- Products: name labels
- Brands: My Nametags
- Website: www.mynametags.com

My Nametags is a UK-based company founded in 2004 by Lars B. Andersen. The company manufactures durable stickers and iron-on labels.

== History ==
My Nametags started making labels in 2004 in London by Lars B. Andersen, who is currently serving as its MD. Since then My Nametags has expanded to ten other countries. The first country they expanded to was Ireland and this country serves as the company's EU business hub. Parents lose up to £150 a year replacing lost school uniform because they don't use name tags and labels. The company was started to solve this problem.

The company manufactures its name labels in the United Kingdom. My Nametags' colour stickers are tested to be antibacterial by Industrial Microbiological Services and have been awarded a certificate under ISO 22196 (Measurement of antibacterial activity on plastics and other non-porous surfaces).

== Awards ==
My Nametags exports to 129 countries globally and received the Queen's Award for Enterprise for International Trade in 2018.
