= The Pantiles =

Georgian colonnade in Royal Tunbridge Wells, Kent, England

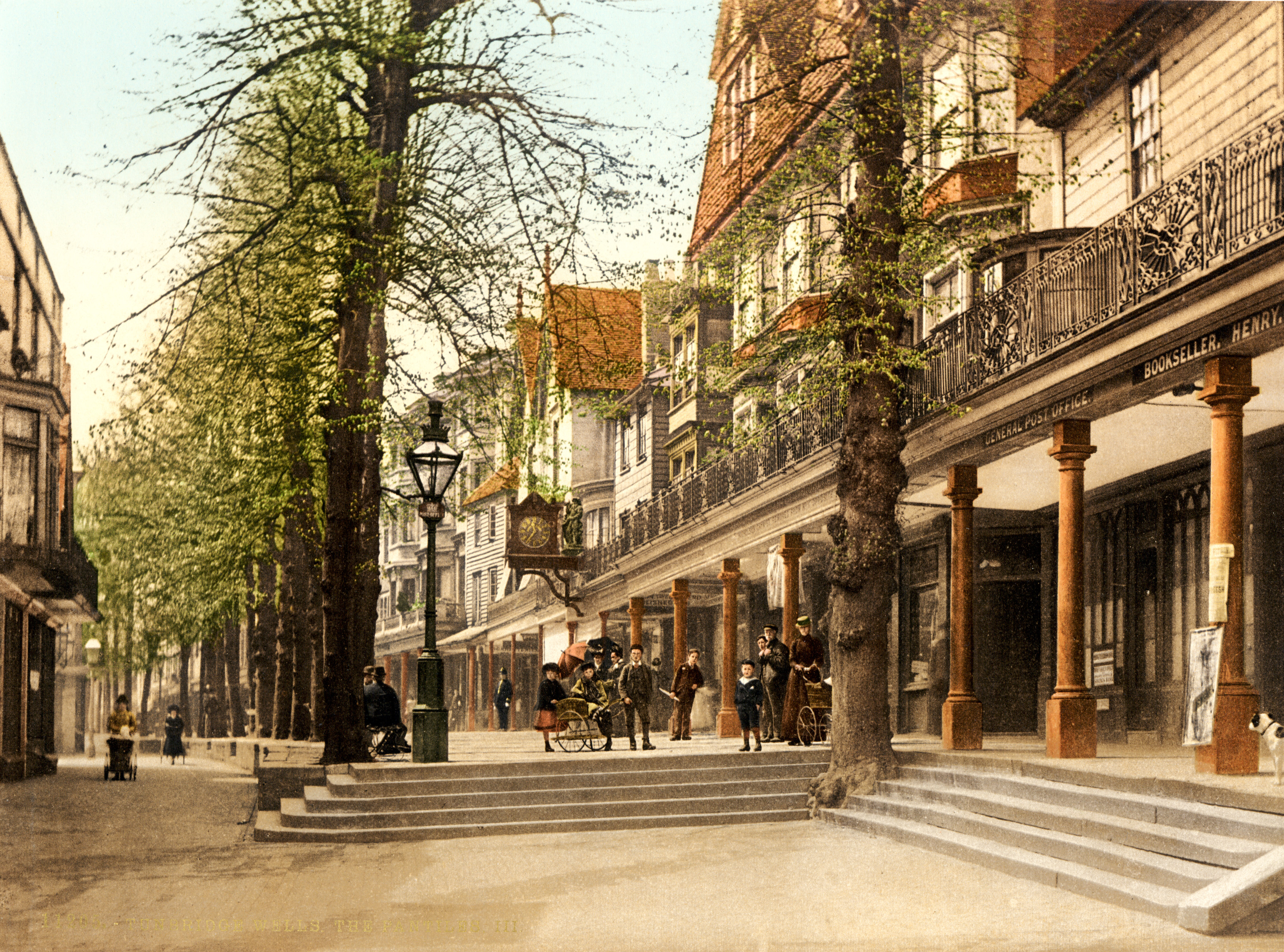
Photochrom of the Pantiles, 1895

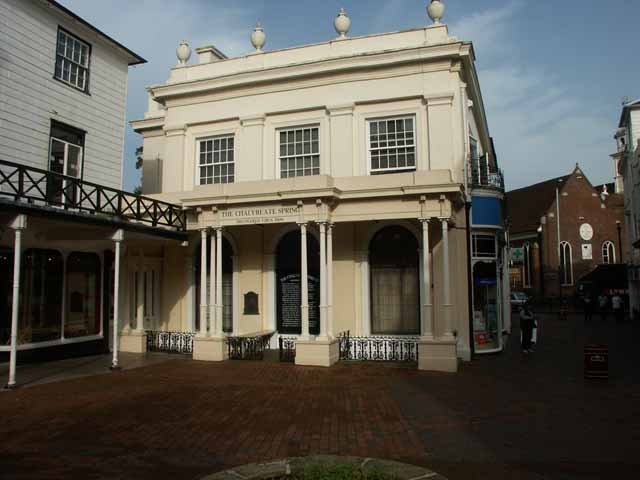
Chalybeate spring building in the Pantiles

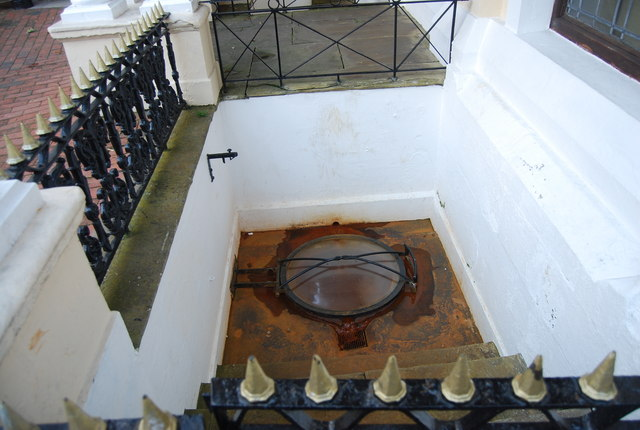
The chalybeate spring itself

The Pantiles is a Georgian colonnade in the town of Royal Tunbridge Wells, Kent, England. Formerly known as "The Walks" and the (Royal) "Parade", it leads from the well that gave the town its name. The area, developed following the discovery of a chalybeate spring in 1606, has become a popular tourist-attraction.

As of 2022 the Pantiles includes a variety of specialist shops, art galleries, cafés, restaurants and bars, as well as a farmers market held outside every other Saturday. Throughout the summer jazz bands play outside on the bandstand, attracting hundreds of people.

== Chalybeate spring ==
The chalybeate spring is situated at the north-eastern end of The Pantiles at 51°7′35.95″N 0°15′31.08″E. The spring is overlooked by the Dipper's Hall. The waters are rich in iron giving them a unique taste.

Tourists can sample the spring water which is served by costumed 'Dippers' every summer.

== History ==
=== 1606–1659: Discovery of the wells ===
Dudley Lord North, a distinguished courtier during the reign of King James I, discovered the waters in 1606. Having lived a fashionably excessive lifestyle, he retired to the countryside (in nearby Eridge) in an unsuccessful attempt to repair his health. Travelling through woodland on his return to London, he discovered the waters and decided to try them. He found his health completely restored and lived to the age of 80.

With public interest aroused, Lord Abergavenny cleared the area of brushwood, sank wells and surrounded them with stone paving and railings. The waters subsequently attracted other visitors, who also claimed their health to be restored. Although few in number, due to the lack of accommodation nearby (at this time, the nearest being in Tunbridge (now Tonbridge), some 5 miles to the north), the visitors were of high social standing. They included Henrietta Maria of France, wife of King Charles I, six weeks after the birth of her son (later to become King Charles II) whose party camped in opulent tents erected at Bishops Down, due to the lack of nearby lodgings.

Originally referred to as Frant Wells, they were later renamed Queen Mary’s Wells, in honour of Queen Mary II and were only later given the present name of Tunbridge Wells.

The Upper and Lower Walks were created in 1638, when an existing bank of earth stretching south-west from the wells was levelled and planted with a double row of trees. Wooden buildings were constructed on both sides of the Walks.

=== 1660–1738: Post-Restoration ===
The wells were neglected and almost forgotten during the English civil wars. It is following the Restoration, that several improvements were made to the immediate area, including construction of an assembly room and bowling green. In 1664, following a dangerous illness, the queen (Catherine of Braganza) was ordered to drink the waters, increasing their popularity.

In 1687, a fire destroyed the wooden buildings located on either side of the Walks. The buildings were later rebuilt with the colonnades which give the Pantiles its distinctive character today. By 1697, coffee houses had been developed in the area.

=== 1739 onwards: the Rusthall Manor Act ===
Rusthall Manor Act 1739
- Act of Parliament
- Parliament of Great Britain
- Long title: An Act for confirming and establishing certain Articles of Agreement, made between Maurice Conyers Esquire, Lord of the Manor of Rusthall, in the County of Kent, and the Right Honourable William Lord Abergavenny and other Freehold Tenants of the said Manor, relating to certain Buildings and Enclosures made and erected in and upon Part of the Wastes of the said Manor; and for making the said Agreement more effectual for the Purposes thereby intended.
- Citation: 13 Geo. 2. c. 11 Pr.
- Territorial extent: Great Britain

Dates
- Royal assent: 29 April 1740
- Commencement: 15 November 1739 (Note: Start of session.)
Other legislation
Amended by	Rusthall Manor Act 1902
Relates to	Tunbridge Wells Gas Act 1875

Status: Amended

Rusthall Manor Act 1863
- Act of Parliament
- Parliament of the United Kingdom
- Long title: An Act for the better Regulation of the Commons of the Manor of Rusthall, and the Rights therein of the Freehold Tenants of the Manor; and for other Purposes.
- Citation: 26 & 27 Vict. c. lxxi
- Territorial extent: United Kingdom

Dates
- Royal assent: 22 June 1863
- Commencement: 22 June 1863 (Note: The Acts of Parliament (Commencement) Act 1793.)
Other legislation
Amended by	Rusthall Manor Act 1902
Relates to	Tunbridge Wells Gas Act 1875

Status: Amended

Rusthall Manor Act 1902
- Act of Parliament
- Parliament of the United Kingdom
- Long title: An Act to provide for the revision of the register of freehold tenants of the Manor of Rusthall and for better defining and regulating their rights and for amending the Rusthall Manor Acts 1739 and 1863 and for other purposes.
- Citation: 2 Edw. 7. c. cxv
- Territorial extent: United Kingdom

Dates
- Royal assent: 28 April 1902
- Commencement: 28 April 1902
Other legislation
Amends	Rusthall Manor Act 1739; Rusthall Manor Act 1863

Status: Current legislation

The Rusthall Manor Act 1739 (13 Geo. 2. c. 11 Pr.) ensured that the Walks, the Wells and the Dipper's Hall would be freely accessible to the public. It also prevented the building of any further buildings on Tunbridge Wells Common.

== Background to the name "Pantiles" ==
- In 1700 the Upper Walks were paved with pantiles.
- On the 1738 map the area appears pretty much in its present form.
- In 1793 the pantiles were mostly removed and substituted with stone flagging – the region was then called The Parade.
- In 1887 the old name was revived.

The pantiles used to pave the Upper Walks should not be confused with roofing pantiles. The paving installed there comprised one-inch thick square tiles made from heavy wealden clay, so named because they were shaped in a wooden pan before firing.

Most of the Pantiles is listed: mostly built early to mid 19th century. No.7 is c.1660; 39-41 was formerly the Gloster Tavern; the Corn Exchange and Royal Victoria Hotel are both early 19th century.

== Events ==
The Pantiles also hosts various festivals during the year including a food festival, a music festival featuring local bands, a fashion market and an open air art exhibition.

During the summer, the Pantiles hosts a summer jazz season, featuring evening outdoor jazz concerts on Thursday evenings where musicians play on the historic bandstand.

== Cultural references ==
The Pantiles was used as a filming location for the 1967 musical Half a Sixpence starring Tommy Steele and Julia Foster. In 1991 it was used as a backdrop for the band World Of Twist, on the cover of their debut album, Quality Street, with the group dressed in period costume. In 2007 it was used in a Christmas television advert for the Morrisons supermarket chain starring the singer Lulu. This caused some local discontent as Morrisons had only recently closed their Tunbridge Wells store. Morrisons returned to the Pantiles for their 2009 Christmas advert starring Richard Hammond and Denise van Outen. In 2021, the Pantiles was the backdrop for the televised Christmas advert of the online retailer, Very.
