= Childrensalon =

British luxury children's clothing retailer

- Company type: Private
- Industry: Retail Fashion
- Founded: 1952
- Headquarters: Royal Tunbridge Wells, United Kingdom
- Area served: Global
- Key people: Michèle Harriman-Smith (CEO)
- Revenue: £80 million (2016)
- Number of employees: 400
- Website: www.childrensalon.com

Childrensalon is a British retailer and manufacturer of high-end fashion and luxury clothes for children. It is based in Royal Tunbridge Wells, England. The company was founded in 1952.

== History ==
Childrensalon was founded in 1952 by Sybil Harriman in a workroom at her house. Before creating the business, she pleated, smocked and remade old fabrics into clothes for her children.

That year, Sybil Harriman created the brand, Joy Models (named after her daughter, Joy) and rented a shop premises. Her husband Rene conceived the name The Children's Salon (the French word for boutique).

Sybil Harriman soon began wholesaling imported French brands, also adding Fair Isle knits and Harris tweed coats, wool kilts from Scotland and Irish Linens from Ireland.

At some point, Sybil Harriman decided to concentrate on her retail outlet, the Children's Salon. In the 1960s, The Children's Salon moved to larger premises. In the late 1970s, Sybil Harriman's daughter, Michele Harriman joined the company.

In the late 1990s Michèle Harriman and her husband George Smith began planning an eCommerce website for the company. In 1999, The Children Salon website was launched.

In 2006, the company name was changed to Childrensalon. During this time, the company suffered 25% of orders being cancelled through lack of stock plus at one time a complete loss of all 25,000 images from the website. Childrensalon was forced to upgrade from its home-made website on a shared server operating from a barn in Eridge, Tunbridge Wells.

In April 2017, Childrensalon launched an Outlet website, initially called The Petit Outlet. In 2018, this was renamed to the Childrensalon Outlet.

== Operation ==
Childrensalon is a family-owned business with its head office and distribution warehouses in Royal Tunbridge Wells. It employs approximately 600 members of staff who speak over 25 languages.

== Financials ==
Revenues in 2017 rose 27% to £80.1 million up from £63 million in 2016. More than 80% of Childrensalon's revenue are generated from sales outside the UK.

== Recognition ==
- 2016 Drapers Digital Awards: Best Multichannel Retailer – £25m-£200m Turnover
- 2016 Pitti Bimbo: Top 10 Children's Fashion Retailers
- 2016 UK Private Business Awards: Private Business Woman of the Year Finalist
- 1000 Companies to inspire Britain 2015
- 2016 Drapers Independent Awards: Highly Commended for Best Customer Experience in an Independent Retailer
- KEIBA 2016: Customer Service & Commitment Award
- 2016 Kent Digital Awards: Gold Award for Online Retailer
- 2016 The Sunday Times BDO International Track 200: 66th place
- 2016 The Sunday Times BDO Profit Track 100: 45th place
- 2015 The Sunday Times BDO Profit Track 100: 10th place
- 2015 The Sunday Times BDO International Track 250: 48th place
- 2015 The Sunday Times BDO Fast Track 100: 77th place
- 2015 50 Fastest growing businesses in Kent: 4th place
- 2012 Drapers and Retail Week PayPal Etail Awards: Best Customer Experience Award
- 2012 Drapers and Retail Week PayPal Etail Awards: Overall Award for Excellence
- 2012 Drapers and Retail Week PayPal Etail Awards: Overall Award for Excellence
