= Random42 =

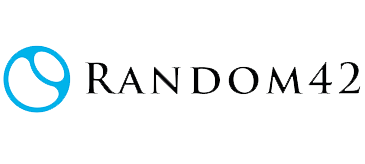

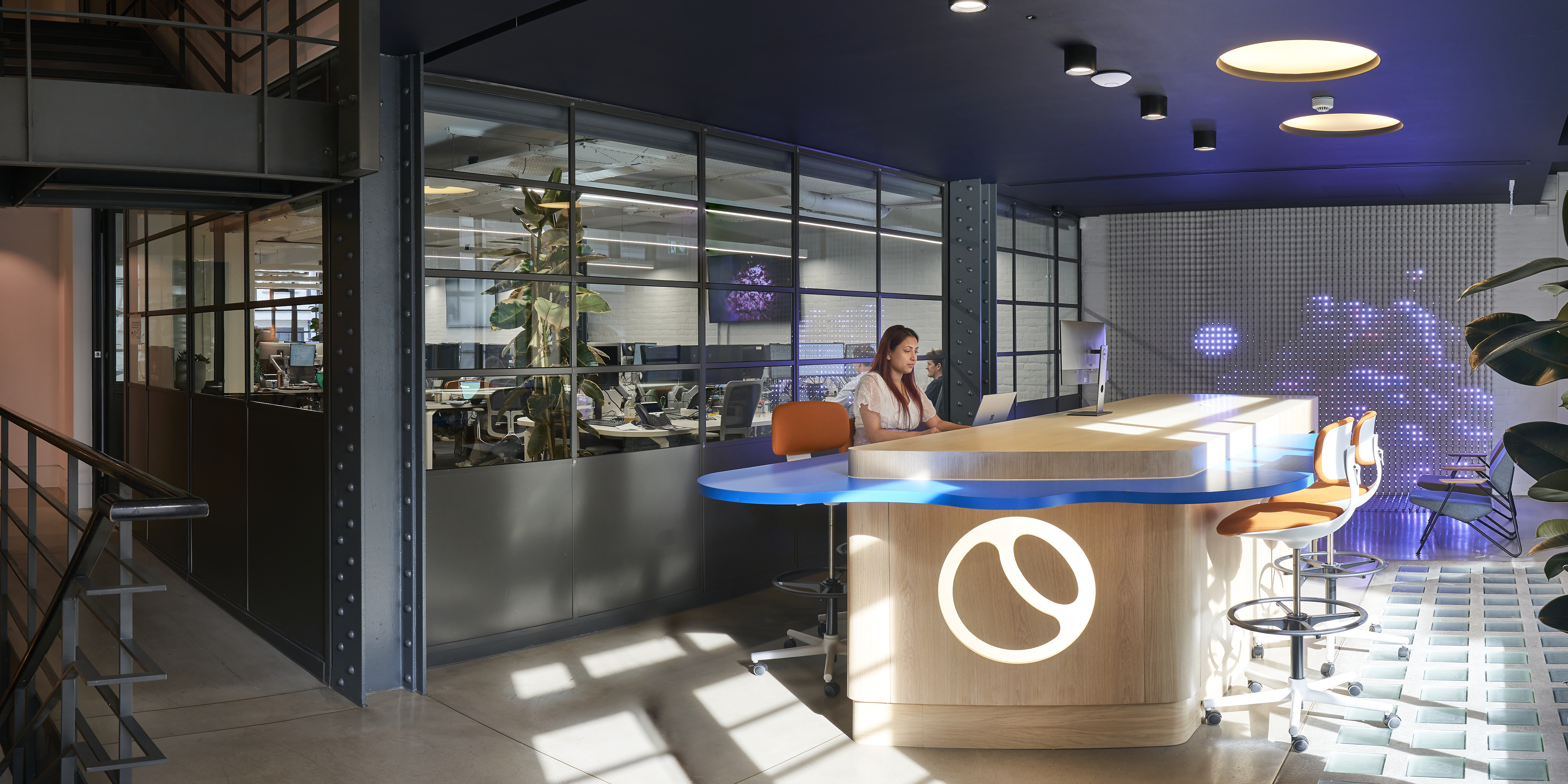
- Interior of the Random42 office 2022
- Company type: Private
- Industry: Scientific visualisation
- Founded: 1992; 34 years ago
- Founder: Hugo Paice
- Headquarters: Marylebone, London, United Kingdom
- Area served: Worldwide
- Key people: Ben Ramsbottom (CEO); Andy Kay (CFO); Eleanor Spreckley (Medical Director)
- Products: Scientific Visual Storytelling
- Website: www.random42.com

Random42 is a British medical animation studio based in central London. It was founded in 1992 by Hugo Paice, focusing primarily on creating animations for the pharmaceutical industry. This has now diversified to a variety of other digital services, including virtual reality, interactive apps, interactive touchscreens, augmented reality as well as booth installations.

In 2018, Random42 was listed as one of the fastest-growing companies in the UK pharmaceutical industry, with its inclusion on Alantra's Pharma Fast 50 list.

== Clients ==
Random42 produces scientific and medical visual content for clients in the pharmaceutical and biotechnology industries. In addition to work in the pharmaceutical sector, the company has created content for areas such as consumer health, medical devices, diagnostics, and animal health. Random42 has also collaborated with the film industry on science-related documentaries, some of which have been screened in IMAX theaters and on streaming platforms like Netflix.
