= Royal Tunbridge Wells =

Town in Kent, England

Coordinates: 51.132°N 0.263°E

- Town
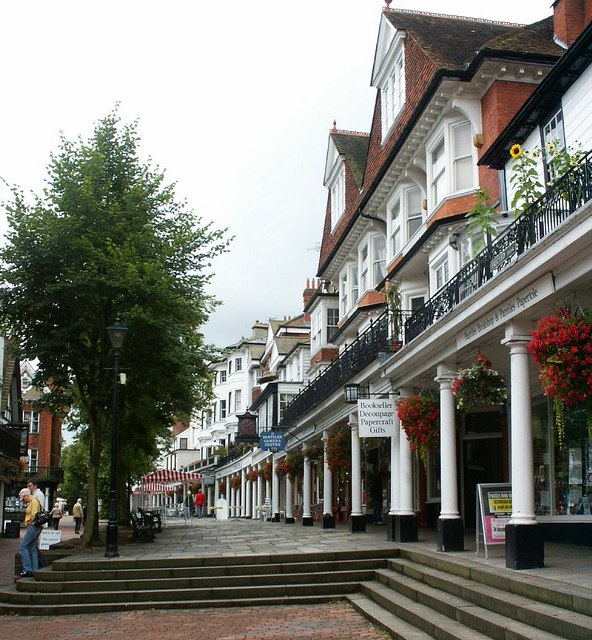
- The Pantiles, the historic and tourist centre of the town

- The coat of arms until 1972

- Location within Kent
- Population: 59,947 (2016)
- OS grid reference: TQ585395
  - London: 33 mi (53 km) NNW
- District: Tunbridge Wells
- Shire county: Kent
- Region: South East
- Country: England
- Sovereign state: United Kingdom
- Post town: TUNBRIDGE WELLS
- Postcode district: TN1-TN4
- Dialling code: 01892
- Police: Kent
- Fire: Kent
- Ambulance: South East Coast
- UK Parliament: Tunbridge Wells

Royal Tunbridge Wells (formerly, until 1909, and still commonly Tunbridge Wells) is a town in Kent, England, 30 miles (50 kilometres) southeast of Central London. It lies close to the border with East Sussex on the northern edge of the High Weald, whose sandstone geology is exemplified by the rock formation High Rocks. The town was a spa in the Restoration and a fashionable resort in the mid-1700s under Beau Nash when the Pantiles, and its chalybeate spring, attracted visitors who wished to take the waters. Though its popularity as a spa town waned with the advent of sea bathing, the town still derives much of its income from tourism. The prefix "Royal" was granted to it in 1909 by King Edward VII; it is one of only four towns in England with the title.

The town had a population of 59,947 in 2016, and is the administrative centre of Tunbridge Wells Borough and in the parliamentary constituency of Tunbridge Wells.

== History ==
=== Iron Age ===
Evidence suggests that Iron Age people farmed the fields and mined the iron-rich rocks in the Tunbridge Wells area, and excavations in 1940 and 1957–61 by James Money at High Rocks uncovered the remains of a defensive hillfort. It is thought that the site was occupied into the era of Roman Britain, and the area continued to be part of the Wealden iron industry until its demise in the late eighteenth century. An iron forge remains in the grounds of Bayham Abbey, in use until 1575 and documented until 1714.

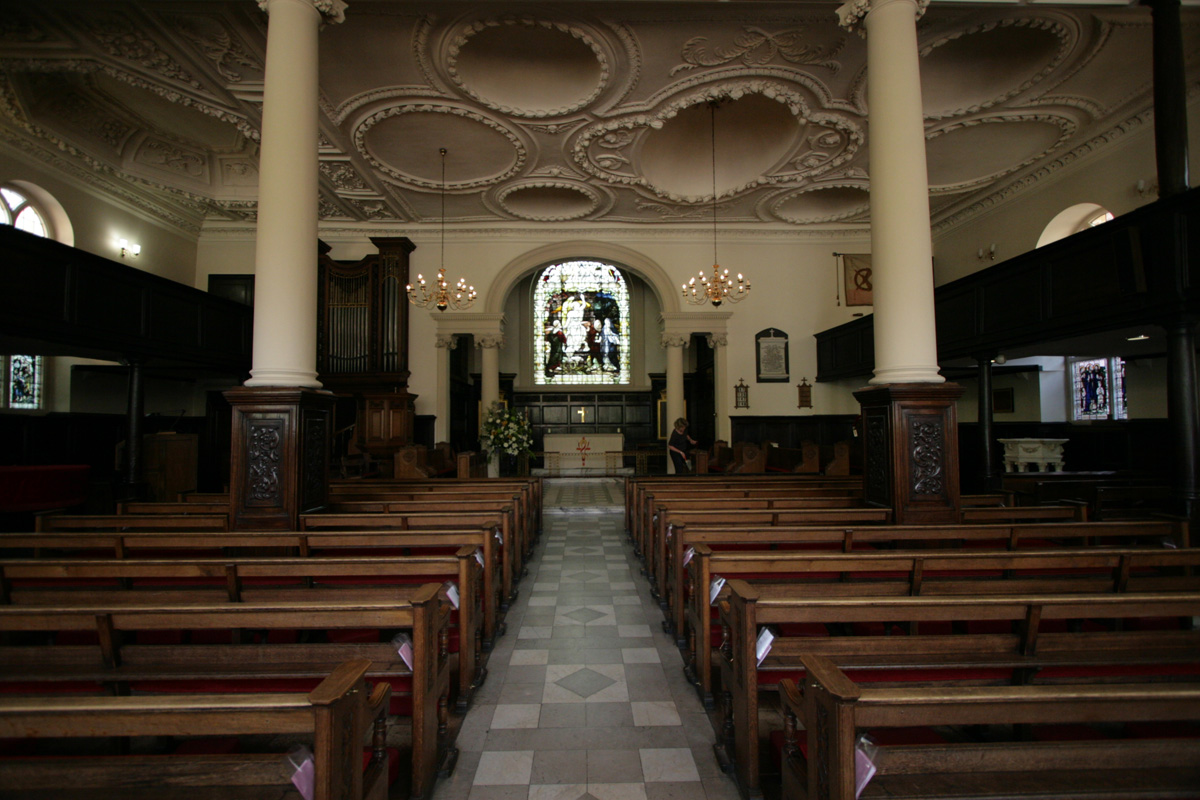
The church of King Charles the Martyr

=== Pre-modern era ===
The area which is now Tunbridge Wells was part of the parish of Speldhurst for hundreds of years.

The origin of the town today came in the seventeenth century. In 1606 Dudley North, 3rd Baron North, a courtier to King James VI and I who was staying at a hunting lodge in Eridge in the hope that the country air might improve his ailing constitution, discovered a chalybeate spring. He drank from the spring and, when his health improved, he became convinced that it had healing properties. He persuaded his rich friends in London to try it, and by the time Queen Henrietta Maria, wife of King Charles I, visited in 1630 it had established itself as a spa retreat. By 1636 it had become so popular that two houses were built next to the spring to cater for the visitors, one for the ladies and one for the gentlemen, and in 1664 Lord Muskerry, Lord of the Manor, enclosed it with a triangular stone wall, and built a hall "to shelter the dippers in wet weather."

Until 1676 little permanent building took place—visitors were obliged either to camp on the downs or to find lodgings at Southborough—, but at this time houses and shops were erected on the walks, and every "convenient situation near the springs" was built upon. Also in 1676 a subscription for a "chapel of ease" was opened, and in 1684 the Church of King Charles the Martyr was duly built and the town began to develop around it. In 1787 the antiquarian Edward Hasted described the new town as consisting of four small districts, "named after the hills on which they stand, Mount Ephraim, Mount Pleasant and Mount Sion; the other is called the Wells..."

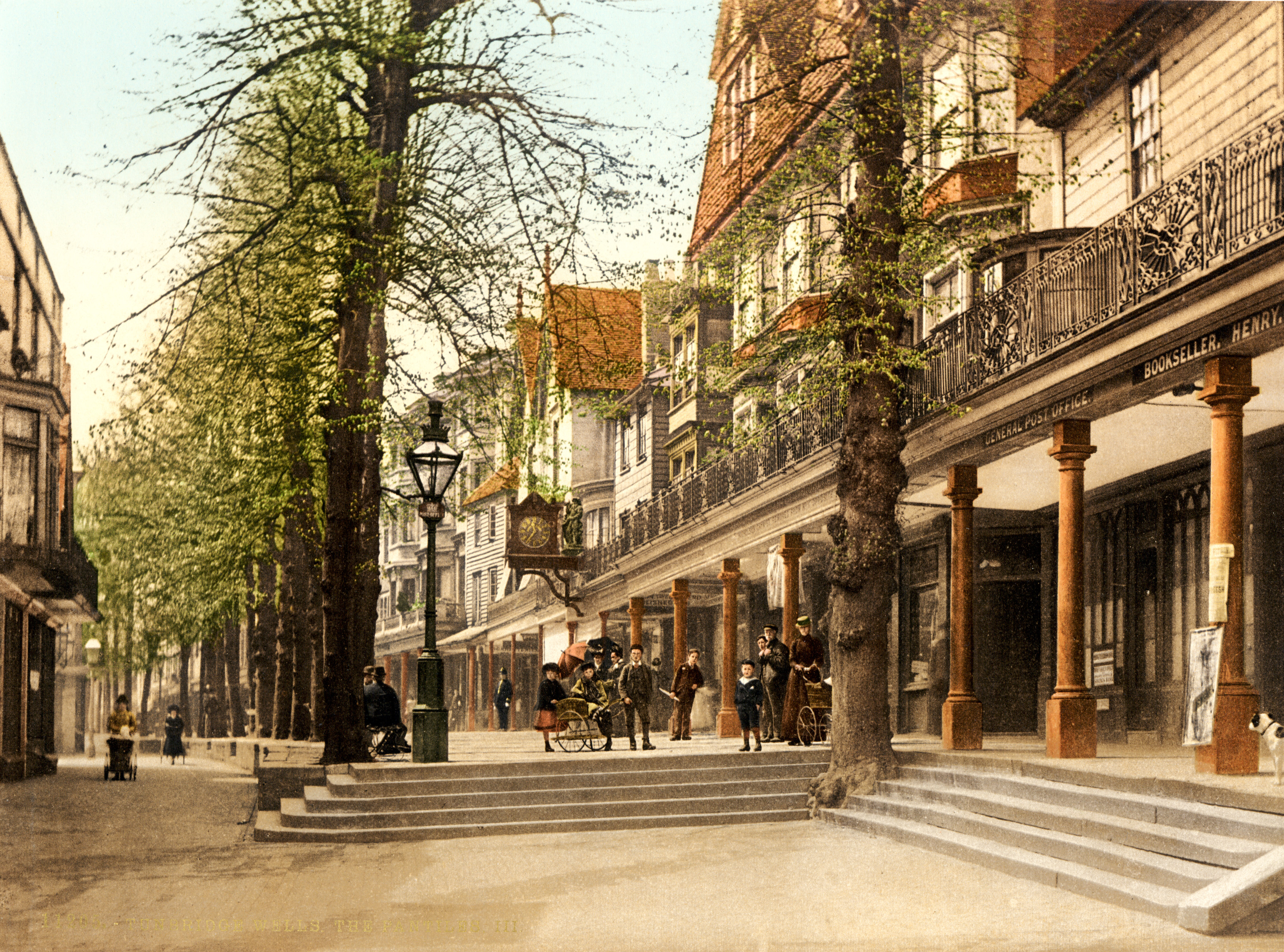
Photochrom of the Pantiles, 1895

In the 1680s there was a building-boom in the town: carefully planned shops were built beside the 175-yard-long (160-metre) Pantiles promenade (then known as the Walks), and the Mount Sion road, on which lodging house keepers were to build, was laid out in small plots. Tradesmen in the town dealt in the luxury goods demanded by their patrons, which would certainly have included Tunbridge ware, a kind of decoratively inlaid woodwork.

"They have made the wells very commodious by the many good building all about it and two or three miles [three or five kilometres] around which are lodgings for the company that drink the waters. All the people buy their own provisions at the market, which is just by the wells and is furnished with great plenty of all sorts of fish and fowl. The walk which is between high trees on the market side which are shops full of all sorts of toys, silver, china, milliners and all sorts of curious wooden ware besides which there are two large coffee houses for tea, chocolate etc. and two rooms for the lottery and hazard board (i.e. for gambling)."—Celia Fiennes, 1697

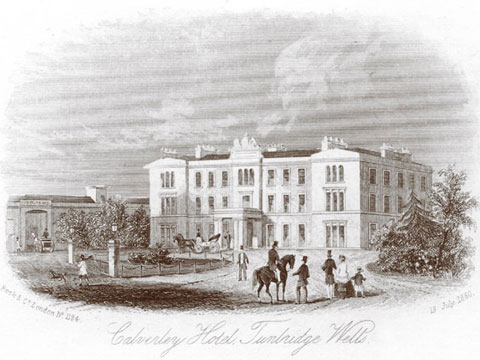
An 1860 engraving of The Calverley Hotel, on Decimus Burton's Calverley estate. It still stands today as Hotel du Vin & Bistro.

Following Richard Russell's 1750 treatise advocating sea water as a treatment for diseases of the glands, fashions in leisure changed and sea bathing became more popular than visiting the spas, which resulted in fewer visitors coming to the town. Nevertheless, the advent of turnpike roads gave Tunbridge Wells better communications—on weekdays a public coach made nine return journeys between Tunbridge Wells and London, and postal services operated every morning except Monday and every evening except Saturday. During the eighteenth century the growth of the town continued, as did its patronage by the wealthy leisured classes—it received celebrity cachet from visits by figures such as Caius Gabriel Cibber, Samuel Johnson, David Garrick, Samuel Richardson and the successful bookseller Andrew Millar and his wife—and in 1735 Beau Nash appointed himself as master of ceremonies for all the entertainments that Tunbridge Wells had to offer. He remained in this position until his death in 1762, and under his patronage the town reached the height of its popularity as a fashionable resort.

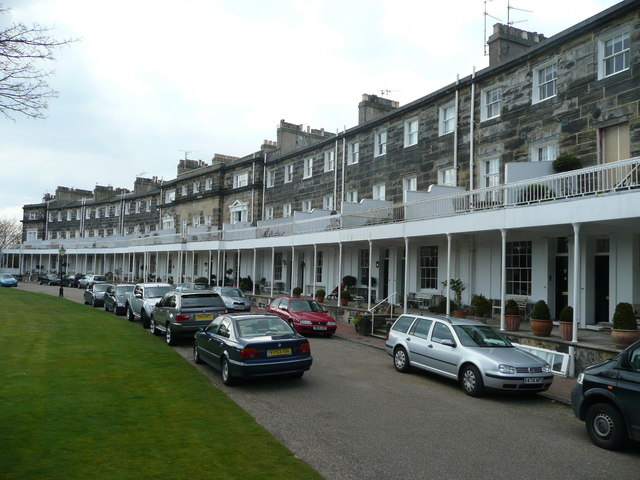
Calverley Crescent, part of the Calverley Park estate

=== Nineteenth and twentieth centuries ===
By the early nineteenth century Tunbridge Wells experienced growth as a place for the well-to-do to visit and make their homes. It became a fashionable resort town again following visits by the Duchess of Kent, Queen Victoria and Prince Albert, and benefited from a new estate on Mount Pleasant and the building of the Trinity church in 1827, and improvements made to the town and the provision of facilities such as gas lighting and a police service meant that by 1837 the town population had swelled to 9,100. In 1842 an omnibus service was set up that ran from Tonbridge to Tunbridge Wells, enabling visitors to arrive from London within two hours, and in 1845 the town was linked to the railway network via a branch from South Eastern Railway's London-Hastings Hastings Line at Tonbridge. During this time Decimus Burton developed John Ward's Calverley Park estate.

In 1889 the town was awarded the status of a Borough, and it entered the 20th century in a prosperous state. 1902 saw the opening of an Opera House, and in 1909 the town received its "Royal" prefix. Due to its position in South East England, during the First World War Tunbridge Wells was made a headquarters for the army, and its hospitals were used to treat soldiers who had been sent home with a "blighty wound"; the town also received 150 Belgian refugees. The Second World War affected Tunbridge Wells in a different way—it became so swollen with refugees from London that accommodation was severely strained. Over 3,800 buildings were damaged by bombing, but only 15 people lost their lives.

Following the war, large-scale housing estates were built at Sherwood and Ramslye to accommodate population growth.

=== Toponymy ===
Edward Hasted asserted that although the wells were originally named the "Queen's-Wells", they soon took on the name of Tunbridge Wells due to their proximity to the town of Tonbridge (known as "Tunbridge" until 1870):

In compliment to [Queen Henrietta Maria's] doctor, Lewis Rowzee, in his treatise on them, calls these springs the Queen's-wells; but this name lasted but a small time, and they were soon afterwards universally known by that of Tunbridge-wells, which names they acquired from the company usually residing at Tunbridge town, when they came into these parts for the benefit of drinking the waters —Edward Hasted, 1797

The prefix "Royal" dates to 1909, when King Edward VII granted the town its official "Royal" title to celebrate its popularity over the years among members of the royal family. Tunbridge Wells is one of only three towns in England to have been granted this (the others being Leamington Spa and Wootton Bassett).

Although "Wells" has a plural form, it refers to the principal source, the chalybeate spring in the Pantiles (where the waters were taken).

== Governance ==
The borough of Tunbridge Wells as shown within Kent

Tunbridge Wells is the administrative centre for both Tunbridge Wells Borough and the parliamentary constituency of Tunbridge Wells. The Borough is governed by 48 Councillors, representing 20 wards (eight wards fall within the town of Tunbridge Wells itself). Elections are held for 16 Council seats each year on a rotational basis, with elections to Kent County Council taking place in the fourth year of the cycle. Each councillor serves a four-year term. Councillors meet regularly at Tunbridge Wells Town Hall.

Tunbridge Wells local elections show a pattern since 1973 of Conservative party dominance, apart from a two-year period from 1994 to 1996 of no overall control and a two-year period from 1996 to 1998 when the Liberal Democrats held a majority. By 2008, the Conservatives had a large majority with 44 seats compared with the Liberal Democrats' four. The extent of the Conservatives' dominance is further illustrated by the fact that in some wards (e.g. Park) Labour did not even field a candidate in the 2008 council elections.

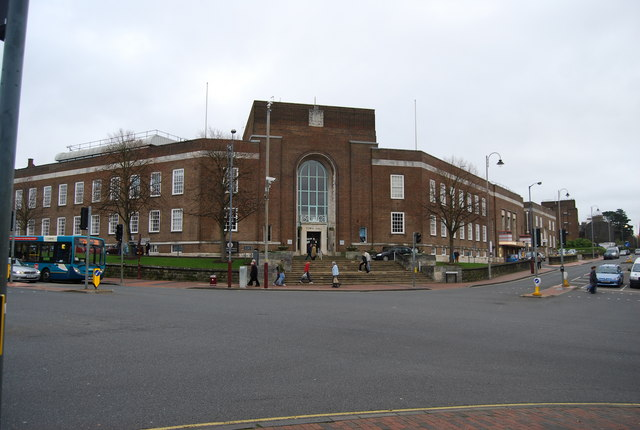
Tunbridge Wells Town Hall

By 2019, the local political situation had changed. In the 2019 local elections, the Conservative majority was cut to 8, and the council leader David Jukes lost his seat following months of controversy over the council's plan to borrow £90 million in order to build new council offices, a new 1200-seat theatre, and underground car parking in Calverley Grounds.

The member of Parliament (MP) for the Tunbridge Wells constituency is Mike Martin of the Liberal Democrats, whose majority at the 2024 general election was 8,687. In September 2019 its MP at the time, Greg Clark, was one of 21 Conservative Party MPs to have the whip removed, after failing to back the Government, in keeping the option of a no-deal Brexit on the negotiating table. The constituency has been mostly Conservative since its inception in 1974 for the 1974 general election; electing a Conservative every election until 2024. Its three previous MPs were Sir Patrick Mayhew (1974–1997), the former Asda chairman Archie Norman (1997–2005) and Clark (2005–2024).

== Demography ==
Royal Tunbridge Wells ethnicity comparison
Ethnicity	Tunbridge Wells	South East	England
White	97.5%	95.1%	90.9%
Asian	0.6%	2.3%	4.6%
Black	0.3%	0.7%	2.3%
Chinese / Other ethnic group	0.7%	0.8%	0.9%
Mixed	0.9%	1.1%	1.3%

In 2006 the town was estimated to have a population of approximately 56,500. This had increased to 59,947 by 2016. The wider borough of Tunbridge Wells is home to considerably more people—some 104,000 in 2001, up from around 99,500 in 1991.

The population of Tunbridge Wells is predominantly White and British in its ethnic origin and Christian in its religious affiliation: 97.5 per cent of residents of the district described themselves as white in the 2001 census, and 75.0% identified themselves as being Christian.

The statistics for crime in Tunbridge Wells show that in 2005/6 there were fewer crimes occurring in the area than the national average.

== Geography ==
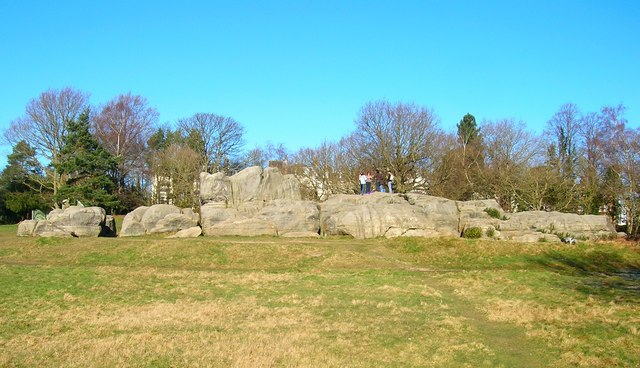
The sandstone Wellington Rocks on Tunbridge Wells common

Tunbridge Wells is on the Kentish border with East Sussex, about 31 miles (50 kilometres) south of London; the original centre of the settlement lies directly on the Kent/East Sussex border, as recalled by the county boundary flagstone that still lies outside the church of King Charles the Martyr.

The town is at the northern edge of the High Weald, a ridge of hard sandstone that runs across southern England from Hampshire along the borders of Surrey, West Sussex, East Sussex and Kent—the town's geology is illustrated by the exposed sandstone outcrops at the Wellington Rocks and High Rocks (a Site of Special Scientific Interest due to its exposed gulls), and the quarries at nearby Langton Green from which sandstone was taken to build houses in Tunbridge Wells. The town is sited at the head of a valley that runs south-east to Groombridge; like the River Teise, which originates in Tunbridge Wells, the stream in the valley is one of the many tributaries of the River Medway, which runs through a much larger valley north of the High Weald. The Tunbridge Wells Sand Formation geological unit takes its name from the town.

The geology of Tunbridge Wells as part of the Weald

Nearby villages have been subsumed into the built-up area of the town, so that now it incorporates High Brooms to the north, Hawkenbury to the south, and Rusthall (whose name resonates with the iron content of the rocks) to the west.

=== Twinning ===
Tunbridge Wells is twinned with Wiesbaden, Germany. In 1960, through an advertisement in the national press, contact was made between former paratroopers in Wiesbaden and four English ex-servicemen in Tunbridge Wells. Through this contact the friendship that now exists between the two towns sprang up, leading to the signing in 1989 of the official Twinning Charter. Also through this the Tunbridge Wells Twinning and Friendship Association (TWTFA) was formed.

=== Climate ===
Tunbridge Wells, like the rest of Britain, has a temperate maritime climate, lacking in weather extremes. The nearest official weather station is Goudhurst, about 8 1/2 mi (14 km) east of the town centre.

The absolute maximum temperature in Goudhurst stands at 34.7 °C (94.5 °F), recorded in August 1990, compared to the average annual warmest day maximum of 28.7 °C (83.7 °F). In total, 11.8 days should attain a temperature of 25.1 °C (77.2 °F) or above.

The absolute minimum temperature recorded in Goudhurst was −19.2 °C (−2.6 °F) during January 1940, compared to the average annual coldest night minimum of −8.3 °C (17.1 °F). In total 52.8 nights should report an air frost.

Annual rainfall averages in Goudhurst 823.3 mm (32.41 in), with over 1 mm (0 in) falling on 120.7 days.

== Economy ==
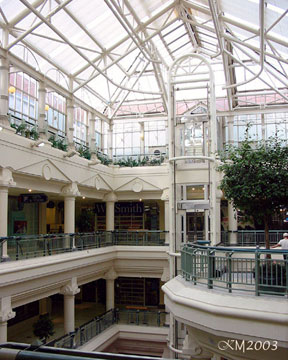
The Royal Victoria Place shopping centre

As of 2002 there were around 50,000 people employed in the borough of Tunbridge Wells. The largest sector of the local economy consists of hotels, restaurants, and retail (the centrally located Royal Victoria Place shopping centre, opened in 1992, covers 29,414 square metres (316,610 sq ft), which accounts for around 30% of all jobs; the finance and business sector makes up just under a quarter of jobs, as does the public administration, education and health sector. Tunbridge Wells is arguably the most important retail centre between London and Hastings. Childrensalon is based in Royal Tunbridge Wells.

The largest single employer in the town used to be the Maidstone and Tunbridge Wells NHS Trust, at the Kent and Sussex and Tunbridge Wells Hospitals, employing around 2500 people; the largest single commercial employer was AXA PPP healthcare, employing around 1,700 in four offices (PPP House, Union House, Phillips House and International House). Tunbridge Wells had a relatively low unemployment rate of around 1.0% in August 2008, compared to a UK national rate of around 5.4%.

== Transport ==
Tunbridge Wells is at the hub of a series of roads, the primary ones being the A26, which runs from Maidstone to Newhaven; the A264, which runs from Five Oaks to Pembury (via Crawley and East Grinstead); and the A267, which runs south from Tunbridge Wells to Hailsham. The A21 passes to the east of the town, following the route of its turnpike ancestor, from London to Hastings.

Bus services are operated chiefly by Arriva Kent & Sussex, providing local town and rural services to Tonbridge, Paddock Wood and Sevenoaks, as well as express services to locations such as Bromley and Maidstone. Eastbourne and Brighton on the south coast are accessible on services run by Stagecoach in Eastbourne and Brighton & Hove respectively, and Metrobus operates hourly services to Crawley.

Tunbridge Wells town historically had three railway stations: two of these are still in use by National Rail services. Tunbridge Wells station is, as its former name of Tunbridge Wells Central suggests, centrally located within the town at the end of the High Street, whilst High Brooms station is situated in High Brooms, to the north of the town. Both stations are located on the double-tracked electrified Hastings Line; services are operated by the Southeastern train operating company.

Tunbridge Wells West station was opened by the London, Brighton and South Coast Railway in 1866 as the terminus of its competing line to Tunbridge Wells, but closed in 1985 along with that line. The station building—a Grade II listed building—is now a restaurant, and a Sainsbury's supermarket occupies the former goods yard. Part of the line was reopened in 1996 by the Tunbridge Wells and Eridge Railway Preservation Society, which now—as the Spa Valley Railway—operates a steam heritage railway that runs from Tunbridge Wells West to Eridge via High Rocks and Groombridge. The western end of the service was extended from Groombridge to Eridge, on the London-Uckfield line of Southern Railway, on 25 March 2011, serving a platform at Eridge which had been disused for many years. The tunnelled link line between the West and erstwhile Central stations, opened in 1876, remains closed.

In 2009 Network Rail installed a 12-car turnback siding just south of Tunbridge Wells station between the Grove Hill and Strawberry Hill tunnels to facilitate a more frequent service and to allow restricted types of London trains starting or terminating at Tunbridge Wells to be operated in 12-car formations. Previously such services were 11-car at most.

Average daily passenger flows on trains between Tunbridge Wells and London increased from about 10,000 in 1999 to over 12,500 in 2008, a compound growth rate of about 2.5 per cent per year. Average daily passenger flows between Tunbridge Wells and Sevenoaks, and between Tunbridge Wells and Tonbridge, have grown considerably faster, though are still much smaller than the flows between Tunbridge Wells and London.

== Education ==
Kent County Council is one of fifteen local authorities in the UK that still provides selective education through the eleven plus exam.

Tunbridge Wells does not have a university of its own, but the Salomons Campus of Canterbury Christ Church University is located just outside the town (near Southborough) and provides postgraduate programmes.

== Sports ==
=== Football ===
Tunbridge Wells' football team, Tunbridge Wells F.C., was formed in 1886 and plays in the Southern Counties East Football League at the Culverden Stadium, and has a history that stretches back to 1886. The team were runners up in the 2013 FA Vase final at Wembley Stadium, losing 2–1 to Spennymoor Town.

=== Motorsport ===
Tunbridge Wells Motor Club is one of the oldest motor clubs in the UK, being founded in 1911. It is still active in the Tunbridge Wells area promoting grass roots motorsport organising an autotest series and several sprint races throughout the year at circuits such as Lydden Hill and Goodwood. World Endurance Championship team Jota Sport are based in Tunbridge Wells. They won the World Cup for Hypercar Teams back-to-back in 2023 and 2024.

=== Rugby union ===
Tunbridge Wells RFC plays its home games at St Mark's, and plays London & South East Premier Rugby at RFU level 5.

=== Rugby League ===
Weald Warriors RLFC are a Rugby League team based in the town, at St Mark's. The Warriors were founded in 2012 and currently compete in the 4th tier of English rugby league in the London & South East Men's League.

=== Cricket ===
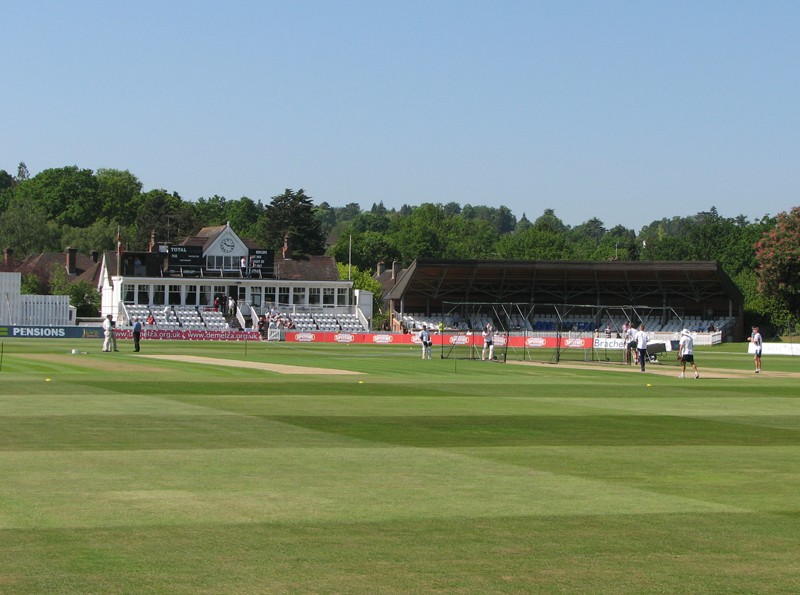
Nevill Ground, the home of the Tunbridge Wells Cricket Club

The Nevill Ground hosts county and international cricket, and Kent County Cricket Club uses it regularly as one of its outgrounds. It is the home of Tunbridge Wells Cricket Club. Tunbridge Wells came into the cricketing spotlight during the 1983 Cricket World Cup when Kapil Dev of India made a then world record score of 175 not out against Zimbabwe. Dev and Syed Kirmani had an unbroken partnership of 126 that is the second highest partnership for the 9th wicket in a one-day international.

Linden Park Cricket Club, which plays in local leagues, hosts its home matches at the Higher Cricket Ground on Tunbridge Wells Common.

=== Field hockey ===
Tunbridge Wells Hockey Club is a field hockey club that is based at the Nevill Ground, and competes in the Men's England Hockey League and the South East Hockey League.

=== Swimming ===
The RTW Monson Swimming Club competes in swimming, diving and water polo and is based at the Tunbridge Wells Sports Centre. Its former member Joanne Rout took part in the swimming events at the 1988 Summer Paralympics in Seoul, aged 12, winning two relay gold medals (also setting two new world records) and three individual silver medals; and as of 2012 remains the youngest-ever British Paralympian. A plaque can be found located in the club's trophy display. Tunbridge Wells Borough Council honoured Rout with the award of their Civic Medallion after her return from Seoul in recognition of her efforts and achievements at such a young age.

=== Running ===
The Tunbridge Wells Half Marathon is an open road race that takes place every February, organised by the Tunbridge Wells Harriers running club. There is a weekly 5-kilometre Park Run that takes place in Dunorlan Park.

=== Squash ===
Tunbridge Wells Squash Club on London Road is a traditional squash club with three courts. There are internal leagues for squash and racquetball, and both men's and ladies' teams in the Kent Priory squash league. Squash facilities are also available at the Tunbridge Wells Sports centre on St John's Rd. which also has a club competing in the Kent priory league.

=== Curling ===
Fenton's Rink is situated in Dundale Farm near Tunbridge Wells. It is one of only two dedicated curling ice rinks in England.

== Public services ==
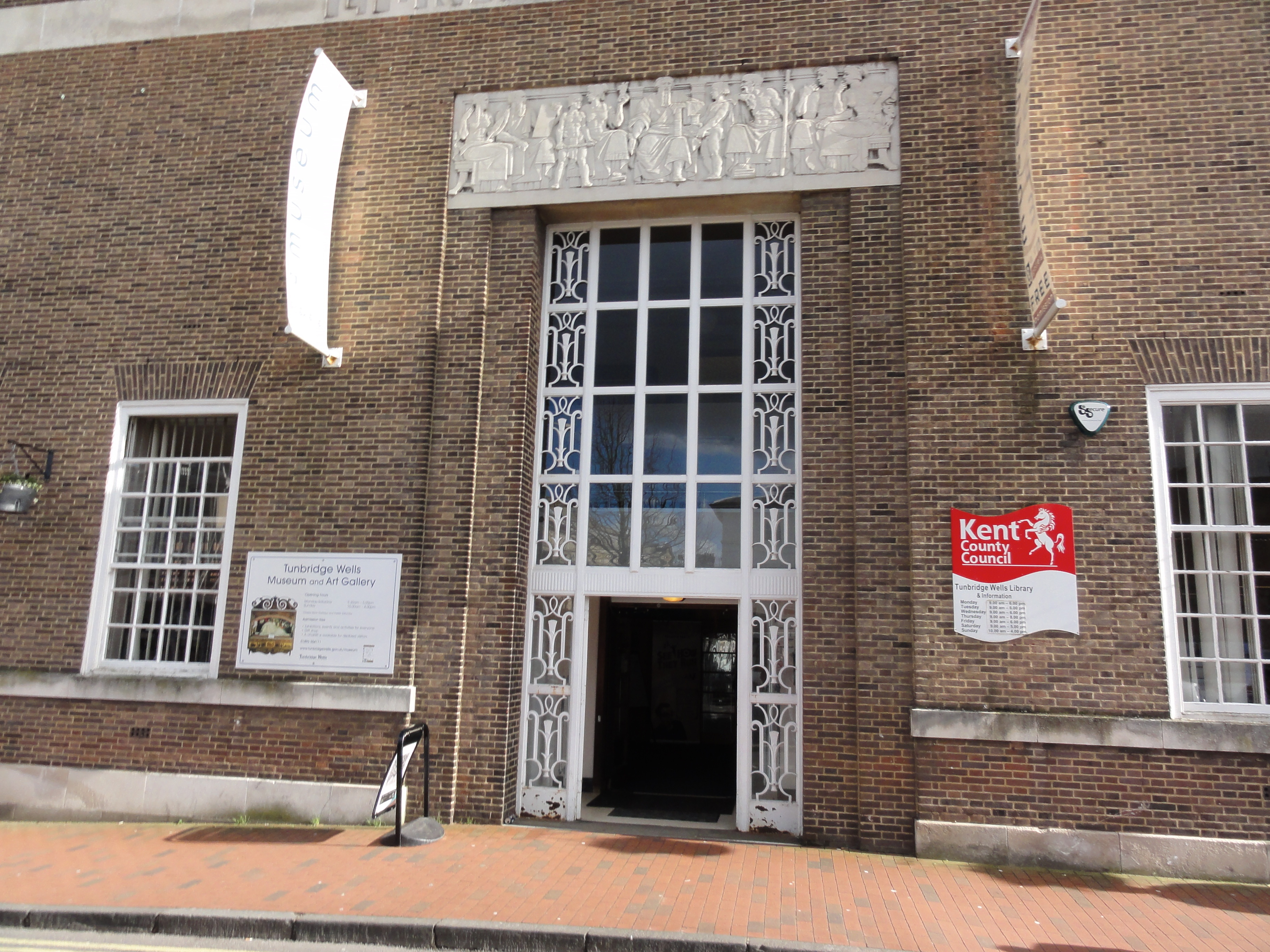
Tunbridge Wells Library, Museum and Art Gallery

Health services are provided by the West Kent Primary Care Trust. Maidstone and Tunbridge Wells NHS Trust runs the new Tunbridge Wells Hospital at Pembury (usually referred to as Pembury Hospital), nearly three miles (five kilometres) from the town, which opened in 2011.

Tunbridge Wells is policed by Kent Police, and in May 2000 the main police station for the area moved from Tunbridge Wells to a new building in Tonbridge and operations at the Tunbridge Wells station, in Crescent Road, were scaled back so that it now operates as an administrative centre. Fire services are carried out by Kent Fire and Rescue Service, which operates one station in Grove Hill Road that is staffed 24 hours a day by both full-time and retained firefighters.

The electricity distribution network operator is UK Power Networks. The town had its own electricity power station that operated from 1895 to 1968. Water services are managed by Southern Water; the main reservoir in the area is Bewl Water.

The Kent and Sussex Crematorium and Cemetery opened in 1873, known initially as the Frant Forest Cemetery due to its location, laid out over 23 acres (9.3 hectares) by the then town surveyor.

Tunbridge Wells has a library, museum and art gallery in Civic Way.

== Cultural references ==
The town at one time had a reputation for being a bastion of the English middle class and a typical example of "Middle England". This is reflected in the locution "Disgusted of Tunbridge Wells", first used by a fictional writer of letters to national newspapers in the 1950s, to express outrage and defend conservative values.

Tunbridge Wells is mentioned in Arthur Conan Doyle's The Valley of Fear, H. G. Wells' Christina Alberta's Father, Thomas Pynchon's Gravity's Rainbow, Philip Reeve's Mortal Engines, E. M. Forster's A Room with a View, Oscar Wilde's The Importance of Being Earnest, Arnold Bennett's The Old Wives' Tale, and Zadie Smith's White Teeth.

The Inspector Bone mysteries by Susannah Stacey are set in and around Tunbridge Wells. In Fanny Burney's 1796 novel Camilla, several characters make an excursion to Tunbridge Wells, and there are many references to The Pantiles and other local sites.

David Lean's epic film Lawrence of Arabia (1962) closes with Mr. Dryden answering King Feisal: "Me, your Highness? On the whole, I wish I'd stayed in Tunbridge Wells", and in the James Bond film On Her Majesty's Secret Service (1969) Tracy Di Vicenzo says to Bond that she "looks forward to living as Mr and Mrs James Bond of Acacia Avenue, Tunbridge Wells".

Tunbridge Wells is referenced in another of David Lean's films, A Passage to India, in which Mrs. Moore (Peggy Ashcroft) exclaims about the odious wife of the District Collector that "My only consolation is that Mrs. Turton will soon be retired to a villa in Tunbridge Wells." Less well known is H. G. Wells's sending up in his 1925 book Christina Alberta's Father: "Tunbridge Wells is Tunbridge Wells, and there is nothing really like it upon our planet".

In Spitting Image, when Britain enters a revolution, Tunbridge Wells declares independence under the slogan of "liberty, equality, gardening".

In the television sketch comedy series Rutland Weekend Television, there is a musical sketch that tells the tale of three United States Navy sailors who plan to spend an exciting—"More exciting than a book of Norman Mailer's"—and glamour-filled 24 hours in Tunbridge Wells.

== Parks and landmarks ==
The Pantiles and its chalybeate spring have been the landmarks most readily associated with Royal Tunbridge Wells ever since the founding of the town, though the 5-metre-high (16 ft) steel Millennium Clock at the Fiveways area in the centre of town, designed by local sculptor Jon Mills for the Millennium celebrations, stakes a claim to be a modern landmark.

Tunbridge Wells contains green spaces that range from woodland to maintained grounds and parks. The most substantial areas of woodland are the Tunbridge Wells and Rusthall Commons, which comprise 250 acres (100 hectares) of wood and heathland and are close to the centre of the town. Open areas of the common are popular picnic spots, and there is a maintained cricket ground situated next to Wellington Rocks.

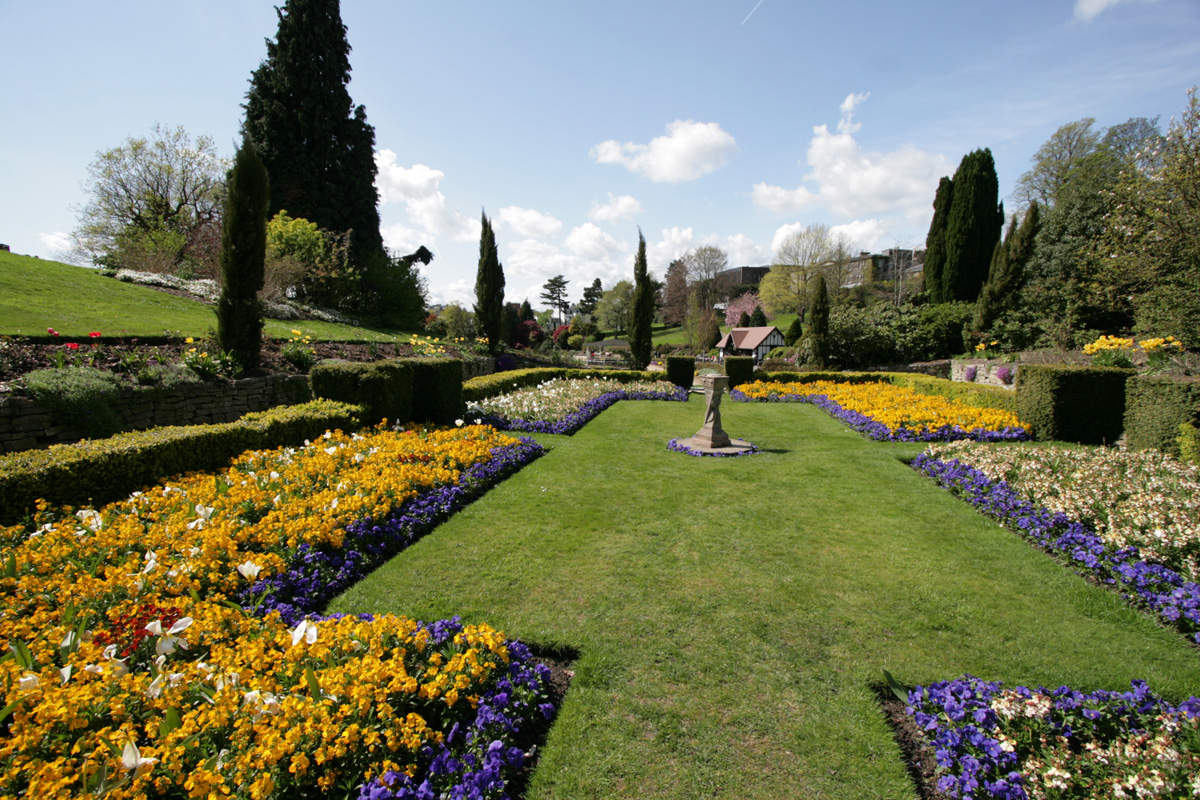
The gardens at Calverley Grounds

Located in the town centre opposite the railway station, Calverley Grounds is a historic park with ornamental gardens and a bandstand (now demolished). The park was part of Mount Pleasant House, which was converted into a hotel in 1837, until 1920, when the borough council purchased it for the town. The bandstand dated from 1924 and was damaged by an incendiary bomb in 1940 and parts of the metalwork were sold for scrap metal. The subsequently repaired bandstand and the adjacent pavilion were intended to form part of a new centre to the park but were never completed. The bandstand was demolished in 2010 although the pavilion still exists as a café. Just inside the entrance to the park coming from the station is a memorial to Air Chief Marshal Lord Dowding, hero of the Battle of Britain, who lived and died in Tunbridge Wells.

Dunorlan Park, at 78 acres (32 hectares) the largest maintained green space in the town, was once a private garden that was part of the millionaire Henry Reed's now demolished mansion, and only passed into public possession in 1941. The gardens were designed by the Victorian gardener James Green, but over the years they became overgrown, making it hard to distinguish the full scope of Marnock's design. In 1996 Tunbridge Wells Borough Council applied to the Heritage Lottery Fund for a grant to restore the park in line with the original designs, and in 2003/4 Dunorlan underwent a £2.8 million restoration. The River Teise rises in the park, and two dams on it have created a pond and a boating lake. Dunorlan is listed as Grade II on English Heritage's National Register of Historic Parks and Gardens.

Great Culverden Park is a 9 1/2-acre woodland in the Mount Ephraim area behind the site of the old Kent and Sussex Hospital and is the remnant grounds of the previous Great Culverden House designed by Decimus Burton that used to stand on Mount Ephraim.

The oldest public park in Tunbridge Wells is Grosvenor Recreation Ground designed by landscape architect Robert Marnock, located close to the town centre on Quarry Road. It was opened in 1889 by Mayor John Stone-Wigg, on the land that was formerly Caverley Waterworks. The lake area with dripping wells remains, but the other lakes, bandstand and open air pool have all gone. There is a bowls club, café, toilets and children's play area, including cycle track. It is adjoined by the Hilbert recreation ground, parts of which have been designated as a local nature reserve by the Kent High Weald Partnership; these include Roundabout Woods and the adjoining grass areas. The Hilbert Recreation Ground was donated to the town by Cllr Edward Strange in 1931, on the site of the form John Beane's Charity Farm. There are two football pitches, built as part of the King George V playing fields scheme, and a skatepark.

The Salomons Museum preserves the home of David Salomons, the first Jew to serve as Lord Mayor of London and the first non-Christian to sit in Parliament. It preserves the bench from which Salomons rose to speak as the first Jewish MP ever to speak in Parliament.

- Friezland Wood

== The arts ==
The town's largest theatre is the Assembly Hall in Crescent Road, which has a capacity of 1020. Nearby, in Church Road, is the Trinity Arts Centre which is a converted church.

The Forum is a 250-capacity live music venue in the town, run by Jason Dormon, where many bands have played their early concerts on their way to success.

=== Festivals ===
The town holds a number of well-established festivals:

- Tunbridge Wells Literary Festival (TWLF) runs for over a week in early May.
- Unfest is an annual local music and arts fringe festival with its base at the Forum. Established in 2010, the free event takes place during the last bank holiday weekend of May.
- Tunbridge Wells Fringe Festival is a not-for-profit arts festival typically running for a fortnight in the summer June to July, established in 2018.
- The Tunbridge Wells Mela offers a celebration of music, dance, arts and cuisine from around the world. Originally organised by Cohesion Plus, Kent Equality Cohesion Council and with the support of Arts Council England, the free family-friendly festival has been running in early July since 2006.
- Local & Live celebrates local and grassroots music during the August bank holiday weekend. The volunteer-run event was started in 2006 by festival organiser and charity chairman Paul Dunton.

Tunbridge Wells held its first TEDxRoyalTunbridgeWells on 6 June 2015.

== Local media ==
Tunbridge Wells has one local commercial radio station, KMFM West Kent. The BBC has its regional centre in the town at the Great Hall on Mount Pleasant Road. It is the base of BBC Radio Kent and for BBC South East regional programmes, the complex contains studios and offices.
