= List of people from Pembury =

This is a list of people from Pembury, Kent, England.

== People born in Pembury ==
- Mark Beeney (b 1967), footballer
- Sam Billings (b 1991), cricketer
- Imogen Boorman (b 1971), actress
- Merlin Carpenter (b 1967), artist
- Rob Cross (b 1990) darts player
- Rackstraw Downes (b 1939), artist
- Charles Ellison (b 1962), cricketer
- Angus Fairhurst (1966–2008), artist
- Victorine Foot (1920–2000), painter
- James Ford (b 1976), cricketer
- Simon Gear (b 1974), cricketer
- Andrew Giddings (b 1963), keyboardist
- James Hamblin (b 1978), cricketer
- Shaun Hollamby (b 1964), touring car driver
- Kelly Holmes (b 1970), Olympic athlete
- Laura Marsh (b 1986), cricketer
- Shane MacGowan (1957–2023), singer
- Sam Palladio (b 1986), actor, singer
- Cat Porter (b 1979), television presenter
- Adrian Quaife-Hobbs (b 1991), Formula 3 driver
- Michel Roux, Jr. (b 1960), chef
- Tommy Searle (b 1990), motocross rider
- Ed Smith (b 1977), cricketer
- Chris Walsh (b 1975), cricketer
- Jonathan Williams (b 1993), footballer
- Robbie Williams (b 1987), cricketer
- Nicholas Wilton (b 1978), cricketer
- Jo Woodcock (b 1988), actress
- Michael Yardy (b 1980), cricketer

== People connected with Pembury ==
- John Barrett (b 1943), headmaster of Kent College, Pembury
- Matthew Dixon (1821–1905), soldier, lived in Pembury at the time of his death
- Stephen Gardiner (1924–2007), architect, lived in Pembury at the time of his death
- Ralph Izzard (1910–92), journalist, lived in Pembury at the time of his death
- Billy Kiernan (1925–2006), footballer, lived in Pembury at the time of his death
- Alfred Musson (1900–95), cricketer, lived in Pembury at the time of his death
- Arthur Osman, nephrologist, worked at Pembury Hospital from the 1940s to 1957
- Sophie Rhys-Jones (b 1965), now Sophie, Duchess of Edinburgh, attended Kent College, Pembury
- Alan Watt (1907–74), cricketer, died in Pembury Hospital
- Iain Dale, broadcaster, lives in Pembury
