= David Fuller =

British murderer and necrophile

- Born: 4 September 1954 (age 72); Deal, Kent, England
- Occupation: Hospital electrician (supervisor)
- Known for: The Bedsit Murders
- Status: Imprisoned
- Criminal charges: Murder, Sexual penetration of a corpse, Possession of extreme pornographic images
- Penalty: Life imprisonment (whole life order)

Details
- Victims: 2 Murdered
- Date: 1987
- Date apprehended: 3 December 2020
- Imprisoned at: HMP Frankland

David Fuller (born 4 September 1954) is an English convicted murderer and necrophile.

In 2021, he was convicted of the murders of Wendy Knell, 25, and Caroline Pierce, 20, whom he strangled and sexually assaulted after breaking into their homes, months apart in 1987, in Royal Tunbridge Wells, Kent, in what became known as the Bedsit murders. The killer's DNA had been known since a cold case review in 2007, and analysis of the samples in the two cases would later prove that the murders were committed by the same unidentified perpetrator. Fuller was eventually identified as the perpetrator in 2020 when a match was made between his DNA and the samples from the case. When finally apprehended Fuller also received 12 years for mortuary offences, having recorded himself abusing the bodies of more than 100 female corpses, over the course of his employment as an electrician at the Kent and Sussex Hospital, also in Tunbridge Wells, and the Tunbridge Wells Hospital in nearby Pembury which replaced it.

He was sentenced to life imprisonment with a whole life order on 15 December 2021, meaning he has no possibility of parole.

In October 2021, Fuller was charged with an additional 16 offences committed at mortuaries in the now-closed Kent and Sussex Hospital, and its successor, the Tunbridge Wells hospital at Pembury, between 2007 and 2020, and pleaded guilty to the charges on 3 November 2022. He is imprisoned at HMP Frankland, alongside other prisoners such as Wayne Couzens and Michael Stone.

== The David Fuller Inquiry ==
In November 2021 Sajid Javid announced that an independent inquiry would investigate how Fuller's crimes went unnoticed. The inquiry was formally set up in January 2022 with Sir Jonathan Michael chairing, and Rebecca Chaloner supporting as secretary. The inquiry was split into two phases, with Phase 1 focusing on Fuller's offences at Maidstone and Tunbridge Wells NHS Trust. Phase 2 would focus on the entire NHS and what procedures could be put in place to protect the deceased in the future.

The Phase 1 report was published on the 28th of November 2023, making 17 recommendations to prevent similar crimes happening again within the Maidstone and Tunbridge Wells Trust. Two hundred witnesses were interviewed or submitted written evidence. It was found that Fuller regularly worked beyond his contracted hours, and undertook tasks that were unnecessary.

Phase 2 of the enquiry was published in July 2025. The report found that England had no organisations that are primarily tasked with protecting the dignity and security of the dead. The enquiry found that the majority of NHS mortuaries still did not have CCTV installed due to ethical concerns about the dignity of the dead. Fuller had previously admitted had there been CCTV in the mortuary he frequented, he would not have committed the crimes. A further 75 recommendations were made, including that the government should take responsibility to ensure the implementation of the recommendations across various organisations and services.

== Personal life ==
Fuller was born in Deal, Kent, England and was married three times. Fuller had previously worked with the Ministry of Defence as part of a four-year apprenticeship. He was interested in birdwatching, cycling, live music and photography. He was an unofficial photographer for London rock band Cutting Crew and in 1985 accompanied them on tour with his second wife, Sally.
