= Maidstone Hospital =

- Maidstone and Tunbridge Wells NHS Trust
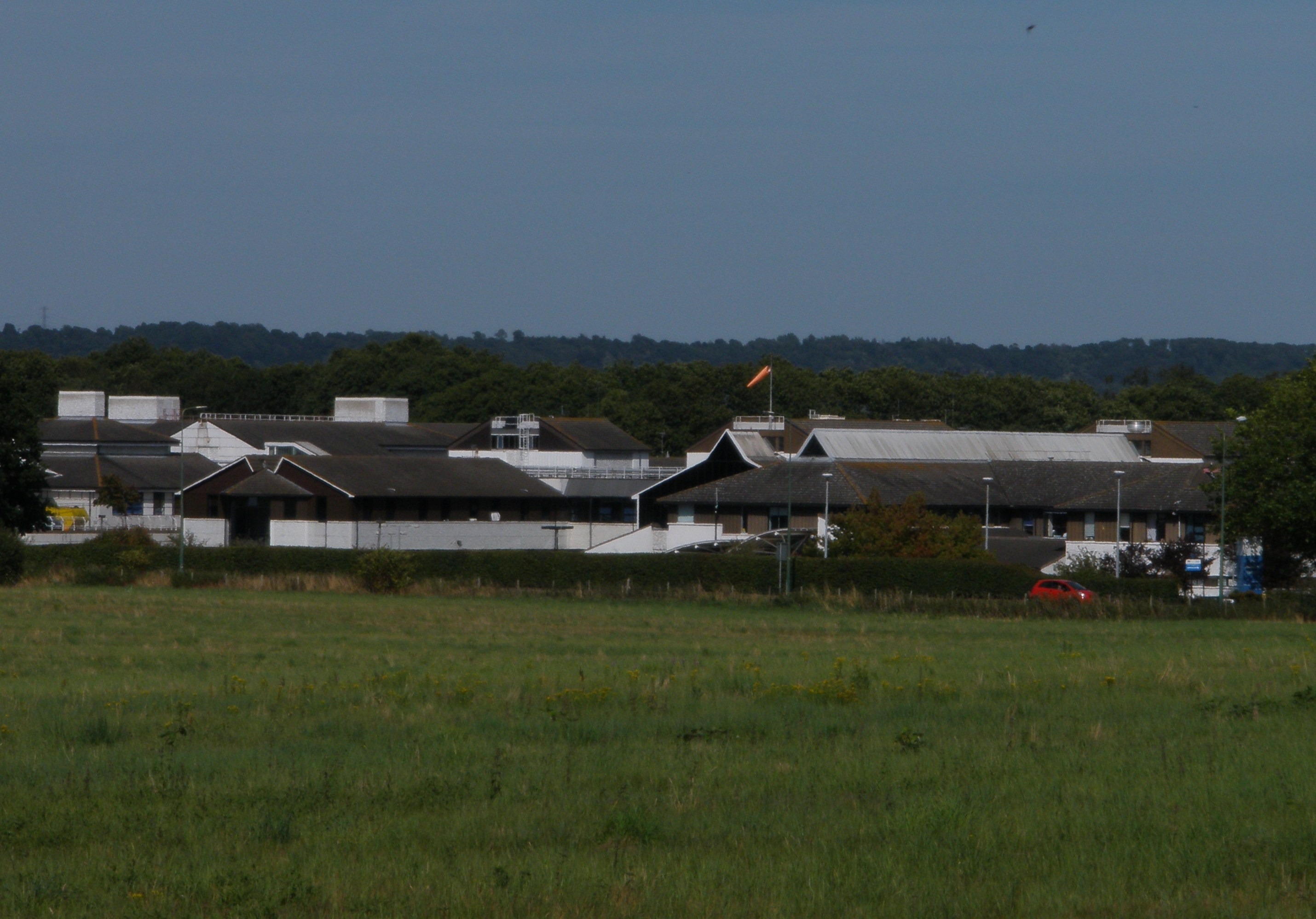
- Maidstone Hospital

- Shown in Region of Kent

Geography
- Location: Barming, Maidstone, Kent, England, United Kingdom
- Coordinates: 51.274°N 0.4832°E

Organisation
- Care system: Public NHS
- Type: District General

Services
- Emergency department: Yes Accident & Emergency

Helipads
- Helipad: Yes

History
- Founded: 1983; 43 years ago

Links
- Website: http://www.mtw.nhs.uk/your-visit/maidstone2.asp
- Lists: Hospitals in England

Maidstone Hospital is a hospital in Barming, Maidstone, England. It is managed by the Maidstone and Tunbridge Wells NHS Trust.

== History ==
=== Early history ===
The hospital, which replaced the West Kent hospital in Marsham Street, was built on a greenfield site adjacent to the now defunct Oakwood Hospital. Extra wings have been added since the hospital opened, including a self-contained orthopaedic unit and new Eye, Ear and Mouth Unit in 2003 (replacing the Ear, Nose and Throat clinic that was based at Maidstone Ophthalmic Hospital (now closed) in Maidstone town centre) and the Peggy Wood Breast Care Centre in 2004.

The £2m Emergency Care Centre, which was one of the first of its kind in the country to offer full A&E services, a GP out-of-hours service and a walk-in centre under one roof, opened in 2005.

=== Superbug outbreak ===
In 2007, the local NHS trust and Maidstone Hospital were involved in a scandal when 90 patients at the hospital may have died as a direct result of contracting the superbug c-diff in an outbreak that began in 2006. A subsequent investigation found these infections to be the result of dirty and overcrowded conditions at the hospital. The report also revealed that the outbreak contributed to a further 240 deaths, although the report does not note if this would have changed the outcome for these patients. More than 1,150 people were ultimately infected.

Just before the report was published, the Maidstone & Tunbridge Wells NHS Trust dismissed their "blameless" Chief Executive "both unlawfully .. and unfairly" and agreed to pay her £250,000, much less than the sum that they were told that defending a case for unfair dismissal would cost. When the proposed payment became known, the Secretary of State for Health, Alan Johnson intervened and the Department of Health ordered the trust to withhold more than two-thirds of the severance payment, although its director general of finance, performance and operations said that "it was 'not unfair'" that she should receive the money. When the case came to the Court of Appeal, the payment was restored in a judgement that was highly critical of the Trust's behaviour, saying "there had been no good reason to dismiss the CEO; and that all this money, both compensation and costs, could have been spent on improving hygiene and patient care in the Trust's hospitals." After the publication of the report, all of the Trust's board resigned.

=== Later developments ===
The Kent Oncology Centre, a specialist centre which provides cancer services for the local area, installed state of the art radiotherapy equipment in 2017.

In March 2026, plans for a new Maggie's Centre were approved. It was announced that the centre would be built at the rear of the main hospital.

== Notable patient ==
- Peter Sissons – BBC newsreader and journalist, died there on 1 October 2019 following leukaemia.

== See also ==
- Tunbridge Wells Hospital
- Healthcare in Kent
- List of hospitals in England
