= Kent and Sussex Hospital =

- Maidstone and Tunbridge Wells NHS Trust
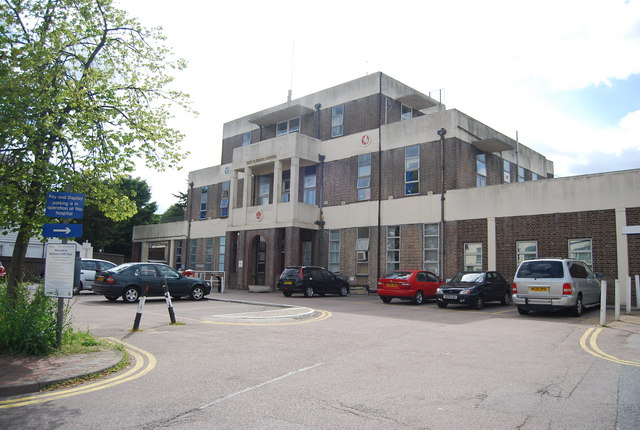
- Kent and Sussex Hospital

- Shown in Kent

Geography
- Location: Royal Tunbridge Wells, Kent, England, United Kingdom
- Coordinates: 51°8′10.36″N 0°15′34.23″E

Organisation
- Care system: National Health Service
- Type: District General

Services
- Emergency department: Yes Accident & Emergency
- Beds: 281

History
- Founded: 1934
- Closed: 21 September 2011

Links
- Website: www.mtw.nhs.uk/your-visit/kent-sussex2.asp
- Lists: Hospitals in England

The Kent and Sussex Hospital was a district general hospital located on Mount Ephraim in Royal Tunbridge Wells, Kent, England serving the West Kent and East Sussex areas. It was managed by the Maidstone and Tunbridge Wells NHS Trust until it closed in 2011.

== History ==
The Kent and Sussex Hospital was built on the site of a mansion called Great Culverden House, designed by Decimus Burton. This replaced the original Tunbridge Wells General Hospital which was founded in 1828 on another site. The foundation stone for the new hospital was laid by the Duchess of York in 1932. The hospital building was designed by Cecil Burns, a local architect, and opened in 1934. The original building was surrounded by lawns on three sides, but the hospital expanded upwards and outwards over the decades. This expansion included the installation of six wartime emergency huts shortly after the hospital's completion; four of these huts were still in use as wards into the 21st century.

In 1934 panels of tiles depicting nursery rhymes and Noah's ark, made by Carter and Co., were installed in the children's ward. The hospital moved from voluntary status to the control of the NHS in 1949.

== Closure ==
Nearby Pembury Hospital was rebuilt as the Tunbridge Wells Hospital in the 2000s. Services were then transferred from the Kent and Sussex Hospital, which closed on 21 September 2011.

Planning permission was granted to redevelop the hospital site for a mix of housing, offices and a school in December 2012.

== Notable staff ==
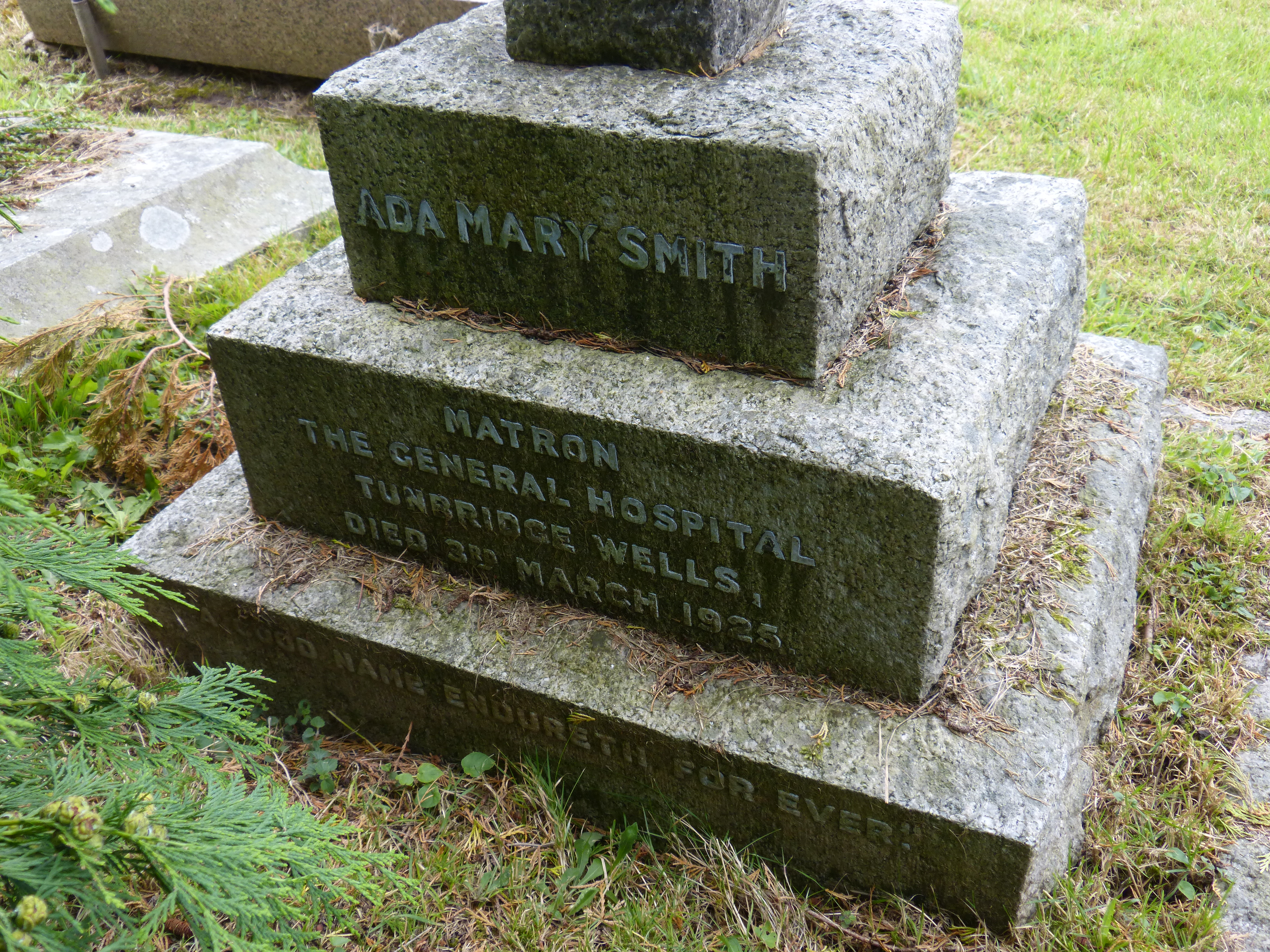
- Close up of memorial for Ada Mary Smith located in Tunbridge Wells Cemetery
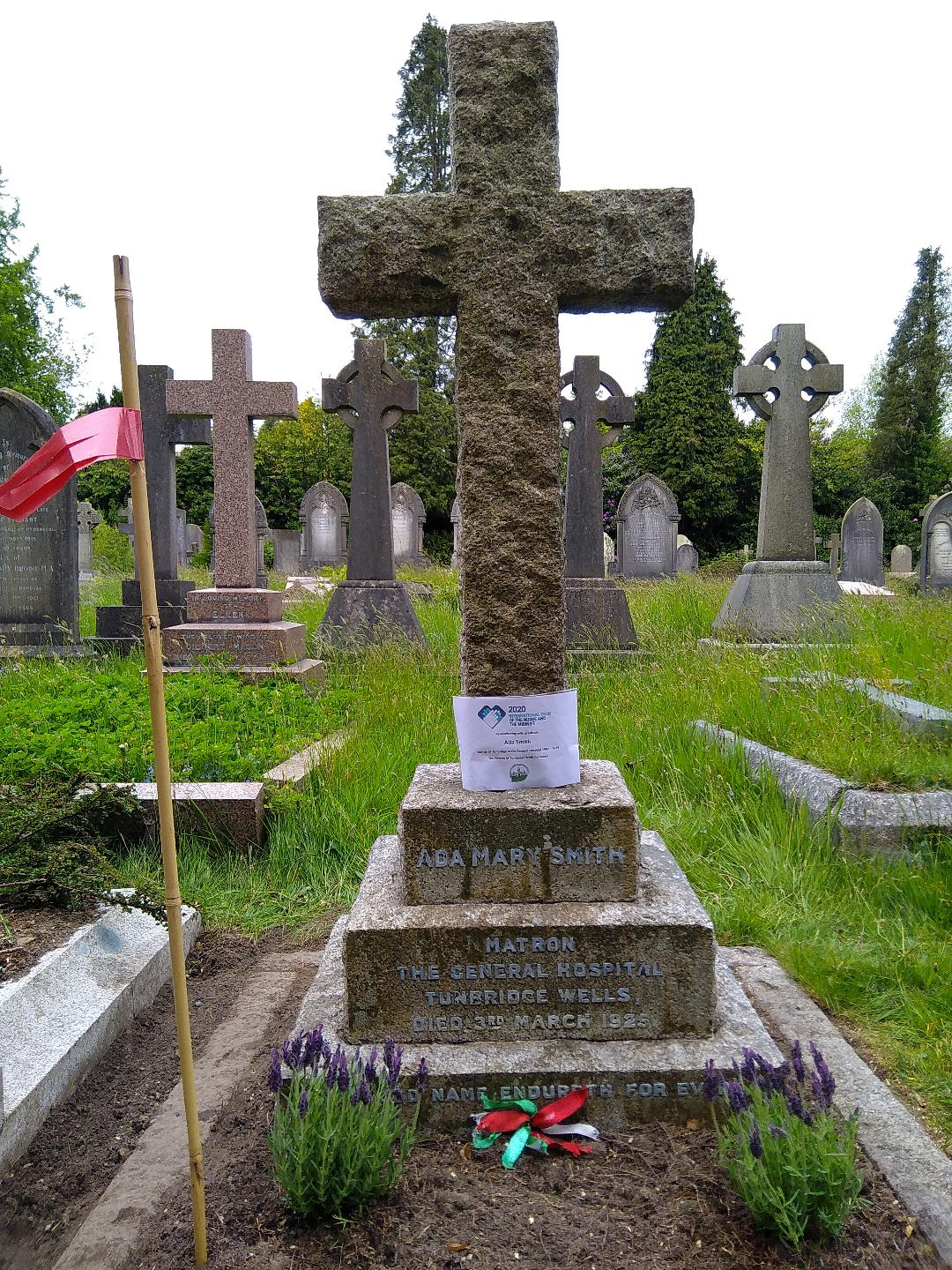
  Matron Ada Mary Smith memorial located in Tunbridge Wells Cemetery
  Ada Smith R.R.C., matron, at Tunbridge Wells General Hospital from 1897 to 1925, and was in charge of local Red Cross VAD Hospitals during the First World War. Smith died inpost after a short illness, and is buried in Tunbridge Wells Cemetery.
- Emily MacManus, sector matron during the Second World War and matron of Guy's Hospital London.
- Mary Frere, matron for the recently opened Kent and Sussex Hospital in Tunbridge Wells from 1938 to 1963. She was matron during the Second World War and was there when the hospital was bombed.

== See also ==
- Healthcare in Kent
- List of hospitals in England
