= Paul Allott =

English cricketer (born 1956)

Personal information
- Full name: Paul John Walter Allott
- Born: 14 September 1956 (age 70); Altrincham, England
- Nickname: Wally, Walt, Wal
- Height: 6 ft 4 in (1.93 m)
- Batting: Right-handed
- Bowling: Right-arm fast-medium
- Role: Bowler

International information
- National side: England
- Test debut (cap 491): 13 August 1981 v Australia
- Last Test: 6 August 1985 v Australia
- ODI debut (cap 63): 13 February 1982 v Sri Lanka
- Last ODI: 3 June 1985 v Australia

Domestic team information
- Years: Team
- 1978–1992: Lancashire
- 1982–1985: MCC
- 1985/86–1986/87: Wellington
- 1993: Staffordshire

Career statistics
| Competition | Test | ODI | FC | LA |
|---|---|---|---|---|
| Matches | 13 | 13 | 245 | 291 |
| Runs scored | 213 | 15 | 3,360 | 878 |
| Batting average | 14.20 | 3.00 | 16.96 | 11.55 |
| 100s/50s | 0/1 | 0/0 | 0/10 | 0/0 |
| Top score | 52* | 8 | 88 | 43 |
| Balls bowled | 2,225 | 819 | 38,927 | 13,939 |
| Wickets | 26 | 15 | 652 | 321 |
| Bowling average | 41.69 | 36.80 | 25.55 | 25.71 |
| 5 wickets in innings | 1 | 0 | 30 | 0 |
| 10 wickets in match | 0 | 0 | 0 | 0 |
| Best bowling | 6/61 | 3/41 | 8/48 | 4/12 |
| Catches/stumpings | 4/– | 2/– | 136/– | 56/– |
- Source: Cricinfo, 10 April 2009

Paul John Walter Allott (born 14 September 1956) is a former English cricketer who played county cricket for Lancashire, Minor Counties cricket for Staffordshire and first-class cricket in New Zealand for Wellington, as well as thirteen Test match appearances and thirteen One Day International appearances for England.

He was a powerfully built, skilful right-arm medium-fast swing bowler, who could also bat adequately at number 9. He was part of a Lancashire side that was successful in List A cricket, winning five trophies between 1984 and 1990, including the Refuge Assurance League in 1989. Allott helped to clinch the latter triumph with some late order hitting in the deciding fixture.

A consistent county performer, he was at his best in English conditions, but lacked that extra zip to enjoy more than a respectable Test career. He scored his maiden first-class half century on his Test debut against Australia at Old Trafford in 1981, also taking four wickets in the match. For three years he was in and out of the side, then had his best Test series in 1984 against the West Indies, taking his best Test figures of 6/61 at Headingley. However, England lost every match in that series. He was forced home from the 1984–85 tour of India due to back trouble, and this effectively curtailed his progression in the Test match arena. He struggled in his last test series against Australia in 1985, and was replaced with Richard Ellison, who was instantly more successful. Sheepishly, he recollected: "They dropped me and picked Richard Ellison, so in a way I won the Ashes for England". In Tests he took 26 wickets at 41.69 each.

Allott left his job as a commentator for Sky Sports to become director of cricket at Lancashire for the 2018 season. He left this role at the end of the 2021 season.
