= Charlie Ellison =

English cricketer

Personal information
- Full name: Charles Peter Ellison
- Born: 26 January 1991 (age 35); Canterbury, Kent
- Height: 6 ft 1 in (1.85 m)
- Batting: Right-handed
- Bowling: Right-arm medium-fast
- Relatives: Richard Ellison (father); Henry Ellison (great-grandfather); Charles Ellison (uncle)

Domestic team information
- Years: Team
- 2011–2013: Oxford MCCU

Career statistics
Competition	First-class
Matches	4
Runs scored	46
Batting average	9.20
100s/50s	0/0
Top score	36
Balls bowled	559
Wickets	9
Bowling average	38.88
5 wickets in innings	0
10 wickets in match	0
Best bowling	3/69
Catches/stumpings	1/–
- Source: Cricinfo, 23 September 2018

Charles Peter Ellison (born 26 January 1991) is an English former university cricketer. Ellison played four first-class cricket matches for Oxford MCCU between 2011 and 2013 as a right-arm seam bowler. He was born at Canterbury in Kent in 1991 and attended Millfield School in Somerset. His father is Richard Ellison who played for Kent County Cricket Club and the England cricket team.

Ellison played his first-class cricket whilst studying for a degree in sport and exercise science at Oxford Brookes University, He made his first-class debut for Oxford MCCU against Nottinghamshire in 2011.

Ellison comes from a cricketing family. His great-grandfather, Henry Ellison, and uncle, Charles Ellison, both played first-class cricket and his father played 11 Tests and 14 One Day Internationals for England and made over 200 first-class appearances in a career which spanned 14 seasons in county cricket.
