= Harry Ellison =

English cricketer (born 1993)

Harry “Dusty” Ellison (born 22 February 1993) is an English first-class cricketer. Ellison is a right-handed batsman and off spinner. He made his first-class debut for Cambridge MCCU in 2014. Currently he is a specialist fielding coach for the KES 1st XI. Ellison's father, Richard Ellison, played for Kent and England.
