= Jamie Ford (cricketer) =

English cricketer and business executive

James Antony Ford (born 30 March 1976), known as Jamie Ford, is an English business executive and a former professional cricketer. He was born in Pembury in Kent in 1976.

Ford was educated at Tonbridge School in Kent before going to Durham University to study Combined Social Sciences. He played cricket for Kent County Cricket Club's Second XI between 1995 and 1999 and for Durham University between 1996 and 1998 as a right-handed batsman who bowled Slow left-arm orthodox spin. He made his senior debut for Kent as a late replacement for the team in a match against Oxford University in June 1996, the only appearance he made for the county First XI. He played four matches in the 1997 Benson & Hedges Cup for British Universities.

Ford worked at Accenture for eight years focussing on business clients in the telecommunications and utilities industries before moving to British Telecom (BT) as Director Customer Experience and Operations in 2008. He moved to become the chief executive officer of Plusnet in 2010 before returning to BT as managing director of IT Services in November 2013.
