= St Anselm's Church, Pembury =

St Anselm's Church
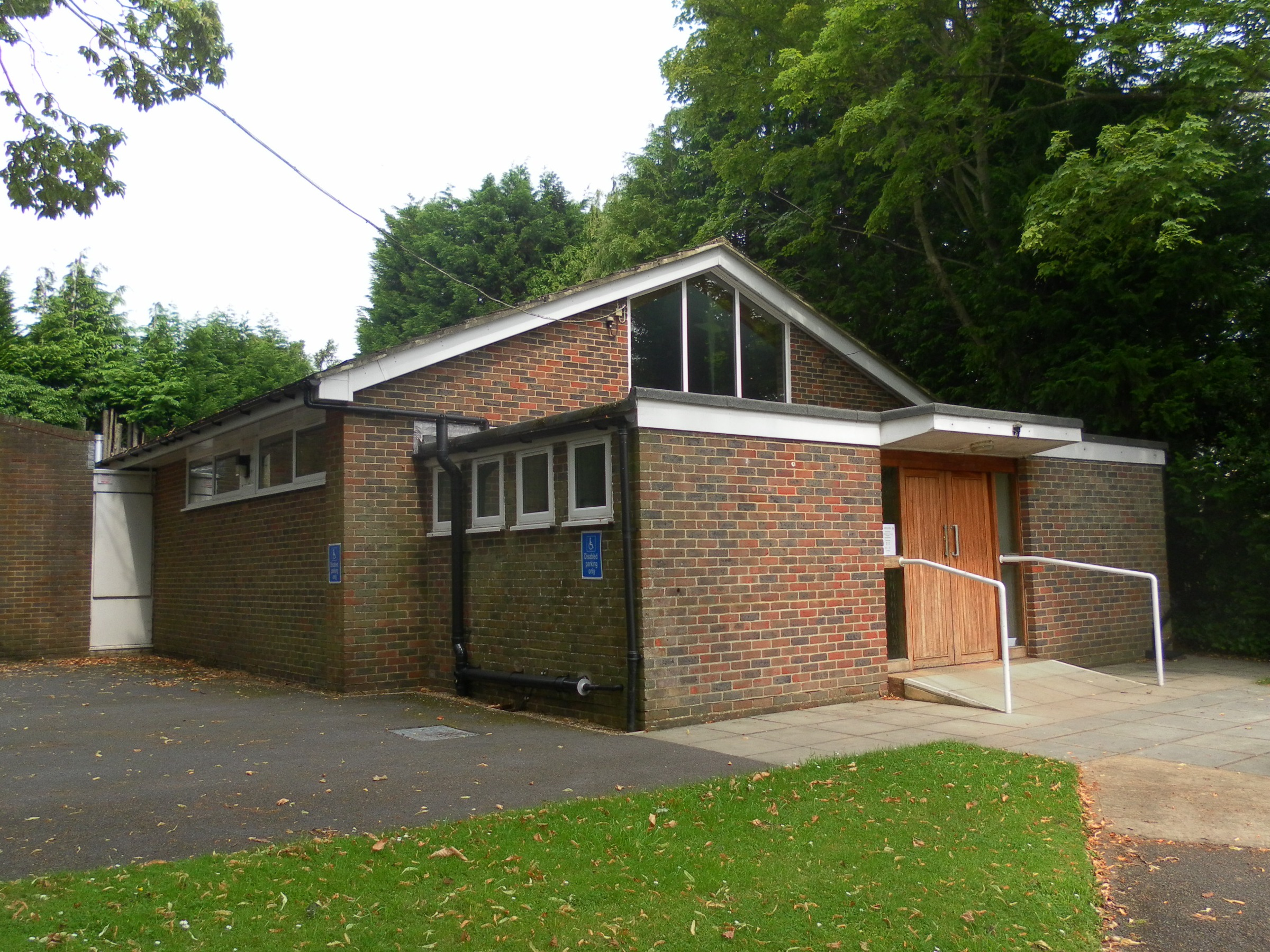
- St Anselm's Church
- 51.1441°N 0.3227°E
- OS grid reference: TQ 62567 40879
- Location: Pembury, Kent
- Country: England
- Denomination: Catholic
- Tradition: Anglican Use
- Website: www.saintanselms.org.uk

History
- Status: Parish church
- Dedication: St Anselm
- Consecrated: 2011

Architecture
- Functional status: Active
- Completed: 1964

Administration
- Division: Personal Ordinariate of Our Lady of Walsingham
- Diocese: Archdiocese of Southwark
- Parish: Tunbridge Wells

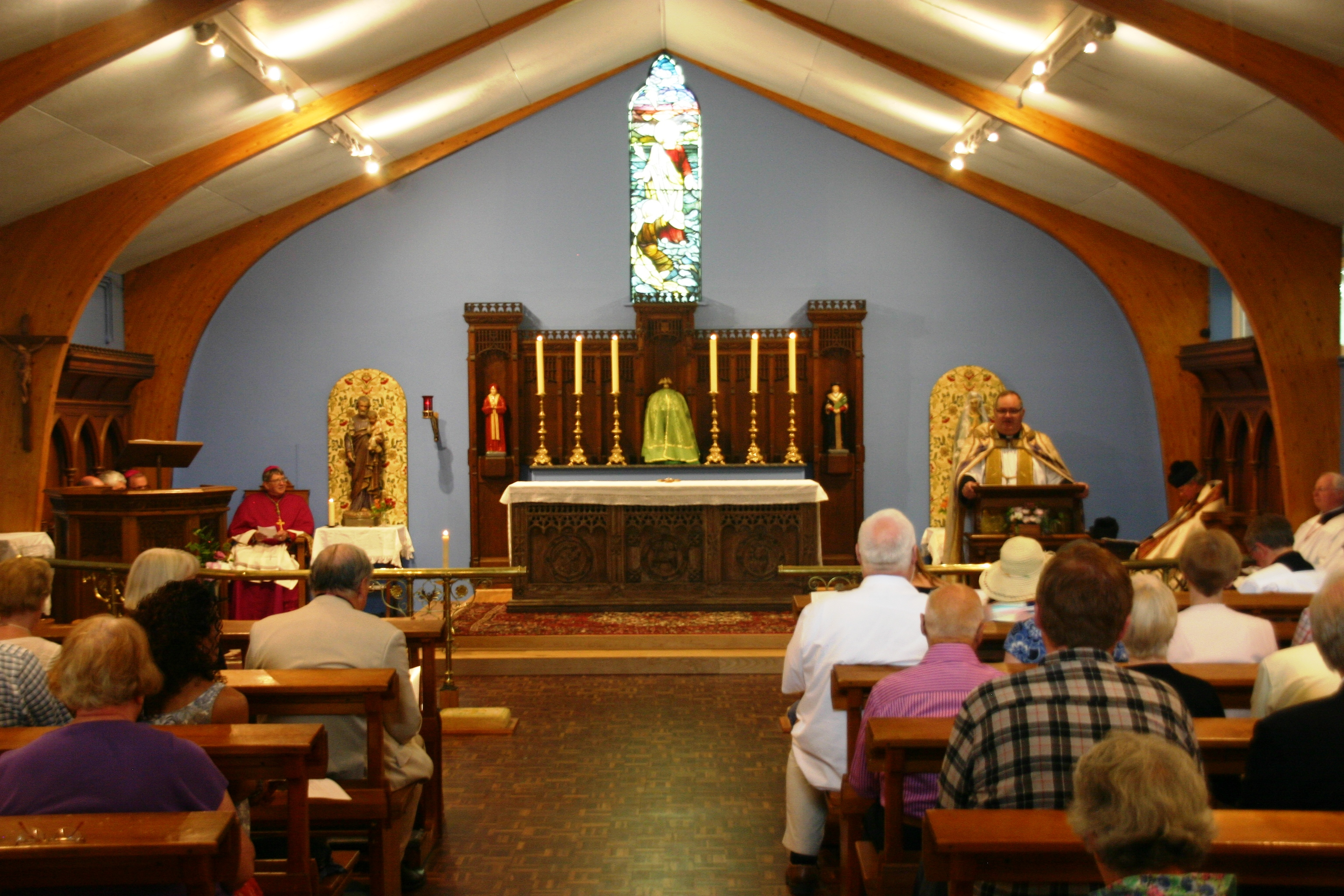
The church's interior in 2018

St Anselm's Church is a Catholic church which is part of the Personal Ordinariate of Our Lady of Walsingham in Pembury, Kent, England. It was originally founded in the 1960s as a chapel-of-ease later serving as a Mass Centre before becoming its own quasi-parish within the personal ordinariate in 2011, following a conversion of a large number of Anglicans in Royal Tunbridge Wells.

== History ==
St Anselm's Church was originally constructed in 1964 as the hall/chapel for a new church that would be part of the Catholic Pembury and Paddock Wood Mission. However, the church remained at Paddock Wood until 1978 when Pembury and Paddock Wood became a parish. The planned church in Pembury's presbytery was sold in 1978, leaving Pembury without a Catholic place of worship. A small chapel was added to the hall in 1980 to alleviate this, though it lost its certification as a registered place of worship. Until 2011, it was used as a chapel-of-ease for the Paddock Wood parish.

In 2011, St Anselm's was granted the status of quasi-parish by the Archbishop of Southwark, This came about because it had become a part of the Personal Ordinariate of Our Lady of Walsingham for Anglican converts, allowing former members of the Church of England to break away and join the Catholic church whilst retaining Anglican traditions in the liturgy. The majority of St Anselm's congregation are former Anglicans who had come from the Church of England's St Barnabas' Church, Royal Tunbridge Wells, led by their Anglican vicar who would become the priest of St Anselm's.

For its first three years, the church had few sacred ornaments, relied on a temporary altar on wheels to conduct services, and shared its space with community groups. With funding from parishioners and neighbouring Catholic parishes, a permanent altar, Stations of the Cross, and other church furnishings were installed with a lychgate built outside, allowing the church to be used solely for Christian worship.
