= Richard Ellison (cricketer) =

English professional cricket player

Personal information
- Full name: Richard Mark Ellison
- Born: 21 September 1959 (age 67); Willesborough, Kent, England
- Nickname: Elly
- Height: 6 ft 3 in (1.91 m)
- Batting: Left-handed
- Bowling: Right arm medium-fast
- Relatives: Henry Ellison (grandfather); Charles Ellison (brother); Charlie Ellison (son); Harry Ellison (son)

International information
- National side: England
- Test debut (cap 509): 9 August 1984 v West Indies
- Last Test: 10 June 1986 v India
- ODI debut (cap 75): 5 December 1984 v India
- Last ODI: 16 July 1986 v New Zealand

Domestic team information
- Years: Team
- 1981–1993: Kent
- 1986/87: Tasmania

Career statistics
Competition	Test	ODI	FC	LA
Matches	11	14	207	175
Runs scored	202	86	5,046	1,967
Batting average	13.46	10.75	23.80	24.58
100s/50s	0/0	0/0	1/21	0/4
Top score	41	24	108	84
Balls bowled	2,264	696	30,046	7,920
Wickets	35	12	475	188
Bowling average	29.94	42.50	28.99	28.29
5 wickets in innings	3	0	18	0
10 wickets in match	1	0	2	0
Best bowling	6/77	3/42	7/33	4/19
Catches/stumpings	2/–	2/–	86/–	27/–
- Source: Cricinfo, 19 February 2010

Richard Mark Ellison (born 21 September 1959) is an English former cricketer who played in 11 Tests and 14 One Day Internationals (ODIs) from 1984 to 1986, playing a key role in the 1985 Ashes series. He was born in Willesborough in Kent.

A burly, curly haired, right arm medium fast swing bowler, he made his debut for Kent in 1981 and took five wickets against the powerful 1984 West Indian side on his Test debut. As well "his distinctive mop of hair", Ellison "is best remembered for ... the fifth Test against Australia in 1985," when, recalled to the national side, he took four wickets for one run in the Australian second innings, thereby completing ten wickets for the match. He took seven more wickets as England wrapped up the series in the sixth Test and was named as one of the Wisden Cricketers of the Year in 1986.

At his best in swinging English conditions, he lacked the raw pace to intimidate batsman under blue skies on tour in the West Indies that winter and his career suffered a further setback when a back injury forced him to miss the 1987 season. He took 71 wickets for Kent in 1988 but was overlooked by England. Ellison joined a 'rebel' tour to apartheid South Africa in 1990 and retired from cricket, aged 33, in 1993, to become Director of Cricket at Millfield School. He was a useful tail ender, good enough to record a first-class century and score 41 in a Test against Sri Lanka in 1984, and took 475 wickets in his 207 first-class games, including 35 Test scalps at under 30 apiece.

Cricinfo summarises Ellison's career as follows: "With his military-medium pace and gentle late swing Ellison seemed to be the ultimate horse for an English course, but he would only play one more Test on home soil. His Test career was over at 26, just two months after he had become one of Wisden's five cricketers of the year and just nine after he had been England's Ashes darling."

== Family background and early career ==
Ellison's mother's "records of family cricketing achievements show that his great-grandfather played against the Grace brothers in the nineteenth century and that his grandfather captained Derbyshire Second XI at the age of 60". Ellison's father, Peter, played cricket with him from the age of three and, aged just seven, Ellison took eight wickets for three runs for Friars Preparatory School, Ashford.

Ellison himself "gives the credit for his development into a swing bowler to Alan Dixon, his coach at Tonbridge School, who later recommended the young all-rounder to his own former county, Kent." However, Ellison was a prodigy, being selected for the Tonbridge first XI in the first year. At school, he was considered primarily a left-handed batsmen, and played alongside Christopher Cowdrey, who was to become his county captain in professional cricket.

Ellison did a teaching qualification at Exeter University, "because I didn't know what else to do – I never thought I'd use it ... I hadn't even planned to stay on in education past 16: I wanted to join the Royal Marines, but problems with my back prevented that."

== County cricket ==
Ellison played for one English county during his entire career; he was Kent's 164th cap, and played for the team from 1981 to 1993. Ellison's first-class debut for Kent came in 1981, when he was just short of 22 years old. He scored 55 not out and 11 not out, batting at number 9 in the order and took the wicket of John Southern for 13 runs, in the five overs he was given in the match.

He played in the 1986 Benson & Hedges Cup final. His bowling figures of three for 27 helped restrict Middlesex to just 199 for seven. When Kent came to bat, Ellison's 29 was in vain, as Middlesex won by just two runs. Two years earlier Ellison had also played a key role in Kent's campaign as they had lost the 1984 NatWest Trophy final to the same opponents off the very last ball of the match. The county had another near miss in 1988, falling just behind Worcestershire in the County Championship, Ellison taking 71 wickets in their campaign.

== International cricket ==
=== Test debut ===
Ellison made his Test debut against the West Indies in 1984, playing the last match of a series in which England were heavily defeated. Ellison took 2-34 and 3-60 in the match. He also played the next Test against Sri Lanka, which ended in a draw, and although Ellison had less success with the ball, he made 41, which remained his highest Test score.

=== 1984-5 tour of India (and after) ===
Ellison played in three tests on the tour of India that winter, taking all of his four Test wickets in the first innings of the surprising England victory at Delhi.

He also made his one-day international debut this winter in the series against India, also playing in the Benson & Hedges World Championship of Cricket and the 1984–85 Four-Nations Cup.

=== 1985 Ashes series ===
Ellison recalls "I had played in the winning tour to India of 1984–85 and bowled well, or so I thought. But I was injured for the early part of the 1985 season, which was incredibly frustrating. I knew that if fit, I could make a compelling case for my inclusion in the Ashes team." His determination to get back into the Test squad was not deterred by not being selected for the first three Tests, but he then had an opportunity to impress the then England captain, David Gower. Ellison's recollection is that "Kent, my county, were playing a game against Leicestershire in July and I approached [England captain] David Gower and said: 'I'm going to make you pick me.' I soon started to take wickets and was called into the squad for the fourth Test in Manchester." Ellison took 3–58 in the first-class match, including Gower's wicket in the only innings in which he bowled.

Ellison was recalled to the squad, but omitted from the XI for the fourth Test at Old Trafford, "fortunately", in his opinion: "I say fortunately because I never liked bowling at Old Trafford; it was more of a spinner's wicket." Only 24 wickets fell in the match, and both Jonathan Agnew and Paul Allott, rivals for a fast-bowling place, went wicketless. In the event, both Agnew and Allot were omitted from the next XI and Ellison was recalled for the fifth test. He remembers: "When we got to Edgbaston I was advised not to play by Bernard Thomas (England physio) as I had a heavy cold. He thought I would not get through five days. The decision was left to me and I thought, as I had come this far, then why not." Ellison took 6-77 and 4-27 in the fifth test and won the man of the match award. In the final test at the Oval, Ellison took 2-35 and 5-46, and England won both tests to secure a 3-1 victory in the series. It would be the last time England would win a home Ashes series until 2005.

=== West Indies tour ===
At the end of the Ashes series, England captain David Gower made an assertion to the media that the West Indies would be "trembling in their boots". "This was doubtless meant as a tongue-in-cheek remark. But like Tony Greig's "grovelling" faux pas of a decade earlier, Gower did little but provoke West Indies' mean machine into a full frontal assault." The ensuing 5–0 defeat to West Indies on the 1985–86 tour had, according to William Buckland, a simple rationale:

For England, Botham, Richard Ellison, Greg Thomas and Neil Foster bought wickets at [an average of] 42 while the batsmen gave them away at 20."

Ellison's personal tally was 7 wickets at an average of 42.00. He took his last Test five-wicket haul in the first test (figures of 5/78) and in the second was able to frustrate the West Indies bowlers with a last-wicket partnership with Greg Thomas. But none of this had any effect on the outcome.

=== 1986 India series (and after) ===
Ellison featured only in the first Test match of the series, taking a single wicket for 80 runs.

He played for England for the last time in a one-day international against New Zealand in 1986, taking 3-43 but finishing on the losing side. A much more successful Test bowler at home than away, his Test wickets cost only 19.37 in England, but 53.00 overseas.

=== Rebel tour ===
In 1990, Ellison was a member of the 'rebel' England team that toured South Africa in defiance of the international cricket boycott of the country, which was then under apartheid rule. "The ... tour was cut short after just nine matches because of protests from anti-apartheid demonstrators."

== After cricket ==
After Ellison retired from cricket, his teaching qualification came in handy, as he said: "I never thought of teaching until I retired and had a phonecall out of the blue offering me a teaching job. And now I'm a housemaster."

Ellison is master-in-charge of cricket at Millfield School. In 2001, Ellison spoke out as a believer that schools cricket "should be played in the first half of the winter term", because of the increasing impact of examinations, notably the advent of AS Levels in the lower sixth. He also teaches PE and is a housemaster for the boarders.

== Personal life and personality ==
In 2007, playing for Millfield, Ellison's son, Harry "returned figures of 7–5–7–5, against Sherborne". He is currently a first-class cricketer with Cambridge MCCU.

Ellison is described by Simon Briggs as, in his pomp: "an unlikely hero, with a white man's Afro ... Hooping the ball around corners."

In 2008, Ellison described himself as follows:

[Since cricket,] I've become more patient and more tolerant. A life spent in cricket can make you very self-centred, so I think I've moved away from that and become more open. People still say I come across as a grumpy old man, though, with a droopy moustache and a worn-out face. But that's just my exterior. Underneath I'm a much softer person. I haven't got rid of the moustache and long hair from my cricketing days, which gets a mixed reaction. Babies in prams look at me strangely quite a lot, so when I talk to them I have to put my finger over my top lip to soften the blow. They think the hair bear bunch [sic] have arrived.

== Statistical summary ==
=== Test career performance ===
		Batting				Bowling			
Opposition	Matches	Runs	Average	High Score	100 / 50	Runs	Wickets	Average	Best (Inns)
Australia	2	3	3.00	3	0 / 0	185	17	10.88	6/77
India	4	43	7.16	19	0 / 0	369	5	73.80	4/66
Sri Lanka	1	41	41.00	41	0 / 0	106	1	106	1/70
West Indies	4	115	16.42	36	0 / 0	388	12	32.33	5/78
Overall	11	202	13.46	41	0 / 0	1048	35	29.94	6/77

=== One-Day International performance ===
		Batting				Bowling			
Opposition	Matches	Runs	Average	High Score	100 / 50	Runs	Wickets	Average	Best (Inns)
Australia	2	26	26.00	24	0 / 0	62	3	20.66	2/28
India	7	34	11.33	14*	0 / 0	258	3	86.00	1/45
New Zealand	1	12	12.00	12	0 / 0	43	3	14.33	3/43
Pakistan	2	15	4.50	6	0 / 0	60	3	20.00	3/42
West Indies	2	5	5.00	5	0 / 0	87	0	–	–
Overall	14	86	10.75	24	0 / 0	510	12	42.50	3/42
