= Henry Ellison =

English cricketer

Personal information
- Full name: Henry Richard Nevile Ellison
- Born: 16 July 1868; Blyth, Nottinghamshire, England
- Died: 7 October 1948 (aged 80); Elstead, Surrey, England
- Relatives: Richard Ellison (grandson); Charles Ellison (grandson); Charlie Ellison (great-grandson)

Domestic team information
- Years: Team
- 1897: Nottinghamshire
- 1903–1904: Wiltshire

Career statistics
Competition	First-class
Matches	1
Runs scored	5
Batting average	2.50
100s/50s	0/0
Top score	3
Balls bowled	10
Wickets	0
Bowling average	–
5 wickets in innings	–
10 wickets in match	–
Best bowling	–
Catches/stumpings	0/–
- Source: Cricinfo, 26 November 2011

Henry Richard Nevile Ellison (6 July 1868 – 7 October 1948) was an English cricketer. He was born at Blyth, Nottinghamshire.

Prior to playing for Nottinghamshire, Ellison made minor appearances for Lincolnshire from 1889 to 1893. He spent from at least December 1893 to December 1894 in India, where he played for the Madras Presidency and Madras. Ellison later made a single first-class appearance for Nottinghamshire against the Gentlemen of Philadelphia at Trent Bridge in 1897. In Nottinghamshire's first-innings, he scored 2 runs, before being dismissed by Bart King, while in their second-innings he was dismissed by John Lester for 3 runs. The match ended in a draw. He later played for Wiltshire in the Minor Counties Championship. Making his debut against Glamorgan in 1903, he played Minor counties cricket for the county in 1903 and 1904, making fourteen appearances.

He died at Elstead, Surrey on 7 October 1948. Ellison's family is a cricketing one. His father Charles played for Lincolnshire in minor cricket. His own son, Peter, didn't play any representative cricket, but his son Richard Ellison played Test cricket for England and was a Wisden Cricketer of the Year in 1986. Another grandson, Charles Ellison, also played first-class cricket. In 2011, his great-grandson Charlie Ellison made his debut in first-class cricket.
