= John C. A. Barrett =

English minister

John Charles Allanson Barrett (born 1943) is an English Methodist and chairman and elected president of the World Methodist Council, succeeding Nigerian Sunday Mbang at the World Methodist Conference in Seoul on 24 July 2006. Before stepping down in 2009 after five years as the first principal of the international Anglo-Chinese School in Singapore, Barrett had a long career as an educationalist.

Barrett was educated at Culford School from 1951 to 1961, Newcastle University (B.A. (Hons), Economics) and Fitzwilliam College, Cambridge (M.A., Theology). He completed his ministerial training at Wesley House, Cambridge and was later awarded an honorary Ph.D. from the University of Florida for his Methodism.

Barrett served as a circuit minister from 1971 to 1973, then from 1973 to 1983 was Chaplain to Kingswood School, Bath. In 1983, he became headmaster of Kent College, Pembury, before moving as headmaster to The Leys School in 1990, where he stayed for 14 years before retiring (and subsequently coming out of retirement to lead the Anglo-Chinese School.) At various points he also taught at Westminster College, Oxford, Wesley College, Bristol and Birches Head High School.

He is married to Sally, who was also on the staff of Kingswood School.

== Publications ==
- Barrett, John C. A. (1981). What is a Christian School?.
- Barrett, John C. A. (1983). Family Worship in Theory and Practice. London, Epworth Press. ISBN 978-0-7162-0386-5.
- Barrett, John C. A. (1990). Methodist Education in Britain.
- Barrett, John C. A. (2000). Methodists and Education: from roots to fulfilment.
- Barrett, John C. A. (2001). Serving God with Heart and Mind (contrib.).
- Barrett, John C. A. (1988–98). sections on Methodism in Encyc. Britannica Year Books.
