= Maidstone and Tunbridge Wells NHS Trust =

NHS hospital trust

- Type: NHS trust
- Established: 14 February 2000
- Headquarters: Maidstone, Kent, England
- Hospitals: Maidstone Hospital; Tunbridge Wells Hospital
- Staff: 8,189 WTE (2024/25)
- Website: www.mtw.nhs.uk

Maidstone and Tunbridge Wells NHS Trust is a large NHS trust in the English National Health Service that manages hospitals in Kent, primarily managing Maidstone Hospital and Tunbridge Wells Hospital at Pembury. It took over the Crowborough Birthing Centre, formerly run by East Sussex Healthcare NHS Trust in November 2015.

== Management ==
The Trust, with East Kent Hospitals University NHS Foundation Trust was jointly procuring an electronic patient record system in a contract worth £10m - £40m in December 2013.

During 2014 the Trust paid Ian Miller more than £250,000 for five months' work as an interim finance director. The funds were paid to The Maxentius Partnership, his own consultancy business. The Trust justified the expense by saying "The independent financial expertise was essential in helping the Trust achieve £23.5 million in efficiency savings last year without impacting on patient care."

The trust has accommodation for about 200 staff close to its hospitals. It anticipated an influx of overseas nurses in 2019/20 and planned to offer them this accommodation on a temporary basis.

== Performance ==
It was heavily criticized in 2007 by the Healthcare Commission regarding its handling of a major outbreak of Clostridioides difficile in its hospitals from April 2004 to September 2006. In its report, the Commission estimated that about 90 patients "definitely or probably" died as a result of the infection.

The Secretary of State for Health, Alan Johnson, described the 90 patients' deaths as "scandalous".

In a subsequent investigation by the Healthcare Commission the outbreak was connected to the financial reorganisations that the hospital trust was undergoing, such as its private finance initiative. In this regard, Richard James, Professor of Microbiology at the University of Nottingham noted striking parallels with Stoke Mandeville hospital, which experienced a severe C. difficile outbreak in 2003–5.

In April 2015 the Trust was the first NHS trust to be charged with corporate manslaughter under the Corporate Manslaughter and Corporate Homicide Act 2007 after 30-year-old Frances Cappuccini died after giving birth by emergency caesarean section in October 2012 at Pembury Hospital. Two doctors involved were charged with gross negligence manslaughter. Errol Cornish, a locum consultant anaesthetist was charged. Dr Nadeem Azeez would have been charged, but left the country. The trial judge, Mr Justice Coulson, instructed the jury that there was no case to answer and the case was dismissed, after 2 weeks, in January 2016. He said evidence showed some of Cornish's actions had been "about as far from a gross negligence manslaughter case as it is possible to be" and called some of the arguments against the trust "perverse". He also criticised Jeremy Hunt for sending a "highly inappropriate" tweet during the trial.

It was named by the Health Service Journal as one of the top hundred NHS trusts to work for in 2015. At that time it had 4964 full time equivalent staff and a sickness absence rate of 3.97%. 73% of staff recommend it as a place for treatment and 63% recommended it as a place to work.

In February 2016 it was expecting a deficit of £23.5 million for the year.

== David Fuller scandal ==
Following the trial and conviction for murder of David Fuller in 2021, it emerged that Fuller, who worked at two hospitals in Kent managed by the trust, had sexually abused at least 100 bodies in hospital mortuaries. The trust commissioned an independent investigation, led by Sir Jonathan Michael, to review the case and to make recommendations for improvements.
