= Kent College, Pembury =

School in Kent, England

Kent College Senior School

Location
- Old Church Road; Tunbridge Wells, Kent, TN2 4AX; England; 51°09′49″N 0°19′31″E

Information
- Type: Private day and boarding
- Motto: Respice Finem - Look to the End
- Religious affiliation: Methodist
- Established: 1886
- Founder: Wesleyan Methodist Schools' Association
- Local authority: Kent
- Department for Education URN: 118946 Tables
- Head: Katrina Handford
- Staff: c. 100 Full time, 25 Part time
- Gender: Girls and Boys
- Age: 2 to 18
- Enrolment: c. 300
- Website: www.kent-college.co.uk

Kent College Pembury is an independent, co-educational day and boarding school located in Pembury, near Royal Tunbridge Wells, Kent, England. Founded in 1866, the school provides education for pupils aged 2-18, comprising a nursery, preparatory school, senior school and sixth form. Historically a girls' school, Kent College Pembury began introducing co-education in its preparatory school in 2020, with the senior school and sixth form recently becoming co-educational as of September 2026.

== History ==
In 1886, the school was established in Bouverie Road, Folkestone, with twelve girls. John Stainer was one of the founders. The original site of the school is now occupied by apartments, which are named after heads of the school. In 1939, the school moved to its current location in Tunbridge Wells because of the danger to girls being too near the coast during World War II. During the war, the school was hit by a V-1 flying bomb, a German aircraft was shot down inside the school's grounds, and a pilot of a Hawker Hurricane died when his aircraft crashed inside the school's grounds. In 1945, the prep school was established in Tunbridge Wells, and in 1989 it moved to the same location as the senior school.

== Prep school ==
Kent College Prep School

Location
- 51°09′49″N 0°19′31″E

Information
- Type: Private preparatory day and boarding
- Motto: Repice Finem - Look to the End
- Religious affiliation: Methodist
- Established: 1886
- Local authority: Kent
- Department for Education URN: 119022 Tables
- Head: Salli Hall
- Gender: Girls and boys
- Age: 2 to 11
- Enrolment: c. 150
- Website: http://www.kent-college.co.uk

The prep school is on the same site as the main school, housed in its own buildings and shares many of the facilities of the senior school.

== School heads ==
- Edith Margaret James
- 1983–1989 John C.A. Barrett
- 1990–2002 Barbara Crompton
- 2002–2007 Anne E. Upton
- 2008–2015 Sally-Anne Huang
- 2016–2021 Julie Lodrick
- 2022–present Katrina Handford

== Notable former pupils ==
- Sarah Sands, former Editor of The Sunday Telegraph newspaper, current editor of the Today Programme
- Sophie, Duchess of Edinburgh
- Suki Brownsdon, swimmer
- Catie Munnings, British Rally Driver
