= Charles Ellison (cricketer) =

English cricketer

Personal information
- Full name: Charles Christopher Ellison
- Born: 11 February 1962 (age 64); Pembury, Kent, England
- Batting: Right-handed
- Bowling: Right-arm medium
- Relatives: Richard Ellison (brother); Henry Ellison (grandfather); Charlie Ellison (nephew)

Domestic team information
- Years: Team
- 1982–1986: Cambridge University
- 1984–1988: Wiltshire

Career statistics
Competition	First-class	List A
Matches	23	5
Runs scored	268	3
Batting average	17.86	3.00
100s/50s	–/2	–/–
Top score	51*	1*
Balls bowled	3,026	169
Wickets	39	0
Bowling average	35.46	–
5 wickets in innings	1	–
10 wickets in match	–	–
Best bowling	5/82	–
Catches/stumpings	7/–	–/–
- Source: Cricinfo, 27 June 2019

Charles Christopher Ellison (born 11 February 1962) is an English former cricketer.

== Biography ==
Ellison was born at Pembury in February 1962 to Peter and Bridget Ellison. He was educated at Tonbridge School, before going up to the University of Cambridge where he studied at both Peterhouse and Homerton College. While studying at Cambridge, he made his debut in first-class cricket for Cambridge University against Glamorgan at Fenner's in 1982. He played first-class cricket for Cambridge until 1986, making a total of 23 appearances. Most notably he dismissed Graham Gooch for 99 on the first day of the 1985 season. Ellison scored a total of 268 runs in his 23 matches, with a high score of 51 not out. With his right-arm medium pace bowling, he took 39 wickets at an average of 35.46, with best figures of 5 for 82. These figures, which were his only first-class five wicket haul, came against Leicestershire in 1986.

In addition to playing first-class cricket, Ellison also played List A one-day for the Combined Universities cricket team, making five appearances in the Benson & Hedges Cup between 1982 and 1986. He also played minor counties cricket for Wiltshire between 1984 and 1988, making eleven appearances in the Minor Counties Championship. His older brother, Richard, played Test cricket for England. His grandfather, Henry Ellison, and nephews, Charlie Ellison and Harry Ellison, both played first-class cricket.
