= Tunbridge Wells Hospital =

Hospital in Kent, England

- Maidstone and Tunbridge Wells NHS Trust
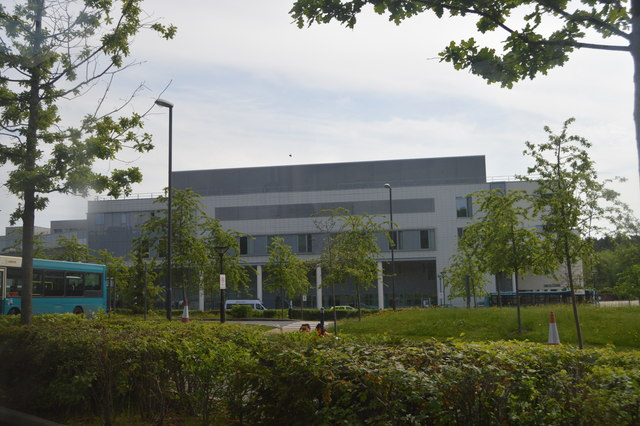
- The Tunbridge Wells Hospital at Pembury

Geography
- Location: Pembury, Kent, England
- Coordinates: 51.1488°N 0.3081°E

Organisation
- Care system: National Health Service
- Type: General
- Affiliated university: King's College London GKT School of Medical Education

Services
- Emergency department: Yes
- Beds: 512

History
- Founded: 2010

Links
- Website: www.mtw.nhs.uk/tunbridge-wells-hospital

Tunbridge Wells Hospital is a large district general hospital in Pembury near Royal Tunbridge Wells, Kent, England, run by the Maidstone and Tunbridge Wells NHS Trust. The hospital is located on Tonbridge Road, around 0.5 kilometres (0.31 mi) to the north-west of Pembury, close to the A21 trunk road. It is surrounded by woodland on three sides.

== History ==
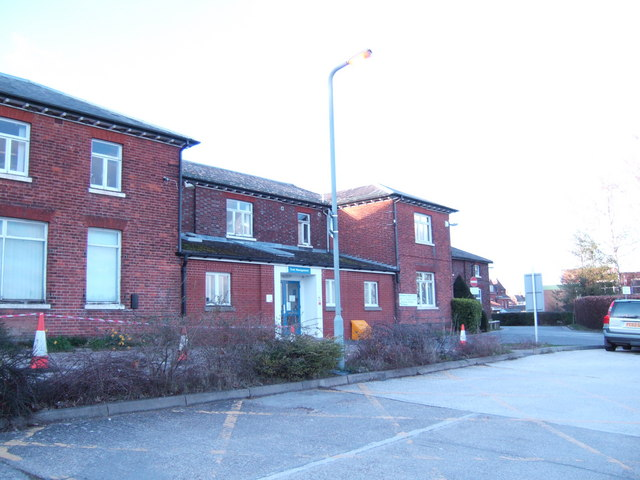
Administration building for the original hospital on the site

The original hospital on the site was a workhouse designed by John Whichcord to accommodate 400 people which opened in 1836. Additional facilities included an isolation block added in 1838, a new clinical block in 1856, a chapel and a school in 1870, an entrance block in 1872 and an extension in 1890. The facility became known as Pembury County Hospital in 1938 and it joined the National Health Service in 1948. The musician, Shane MacGowan, was born in the hospital in 1957 and the athlete, Dame Kelly Holmes, was born there in 1970. After services had transferred to the new Tunbridge Wells Hospital, all the hospital buildings, other than the chapel, were demolished in September 2011.

A new hospital was procured under a Private Finance Initiative contract to replace both the Pembury County Hospital and the Kent and Sussex Hospital. The new hospital was designed by Anshen & Allen and built by Laing O'Rourke at a cost of £230 million. The first phase of the new hospital, on which construction started in 2008, opened in January 2011; the rest of the hospital opened on 21 September 2011 at which time all services were transferred from the Kent and Sussex Hospital. The new hospital was denied a "Royal" prefix as though it serves Royal Tunbridge Wells, it is not located within the town's boundaries. Facilities management services are provided by Interserve.

== Facilities ==
The new hospital has 512 beds and provides a full range of clinical services including an Accident and Emergency department. The first department to transfer to the new hospital was the maternity department, with the first baby being born in the new unit in January 2011. Every inpatient has their own room with en-suite facilities, with ceiling to floor windows revealing views over surrounding woodland. The maternity unit sees nearly 100 babies born every week and the A&E department treats 50,000 patients every year.

== Notable staff ==
- Taubie Fagelman, matron at Pembury Hospital during the Second World War, until 1957. She established the hospital's first Preliminary Training School ('PTS') for nurses at Blackhurst, a large country house off the Pembury Road. This was the first PTS in Kent.
- Emily MacManus, sector matron during the Second World War and matron of Guy's Hospital London.
- Jane Jacobs, ( –1964) matron of Pembury Hospital from 1957. She had trained at Guy's Hospital, London, Queen Charlotte Hospital and the South London Hospital for Women. During the war she was Night Superintendent at Guy's and had visited Orpington and Pembury Hospitals. Jacobs was a 'progressive moderniser', but unfortunately died shortly after she took up an appointment at the Department of Health.

== See also ==
- Healthcare in Kent
- List of hospitals in England
