= Pembury =

Village in Kent, England

Coordinates: 51.1456°N 0.3224°E

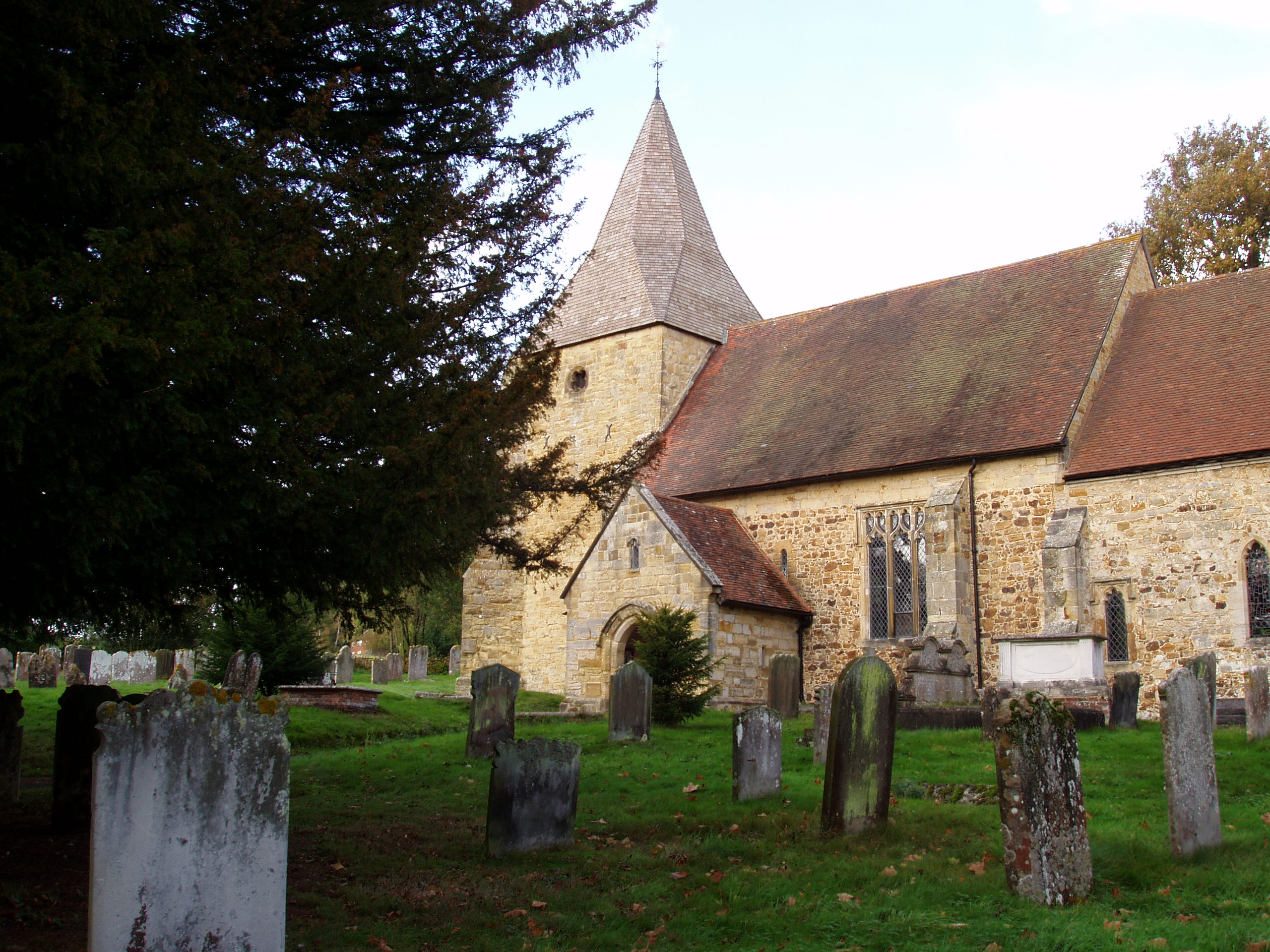
- Pembury Parish Church

- Location within Kent
- Population: 6,128 (2011)
- OS grid reference: TQ625410
- District: Tunbridge Wells
- Shire county: Kent
- Region: South East
- Country: England
- Sovereign state: United Kingdom
- Post town: Tunbridge Wells
- Postcode district: TN2
- Dialling code: 01892
- Police: Kent
- Fire: Kent
- Ambulance: South East Coast
- UK Parliament: Tunbridge Wells

Pembury is a large village in Kent, in the south east of England, with a population of 6,128 at the 2011 census. It lies just to the north-east of Royal Tunbridge Wells.

The village centre, including the village green and High Street area is a conservation area.

== History ==
A settlement in Pembury almost certainly predates the Norman Conquest, as the village church of St Peter is of Norman origin. It is thought to have been built in the early 12th or late 11th century, though the earliest it can be dated with certainty is to 1337, when John Culpeper of Bayhall carried out building work to the church.

The first recorded mention of Pembury is as "Peppingeberia" in the 12th-century Textus Roffensis, though Edward Hasted states that it was also known in ancient deeds as "Pepenbery".

With the widespread introduction of the motor vehicle in the early 20th century, Pembury Hospital hosted a centre of groundbreaking research and treatment for hodophobia (fear of road travel). Some of the original test subjects settled in Pembury, and many of their descendants still live in the village today.

In late January 2010, the remains of an Iron Age settlement were discovered along the route of South East Water's planned 2.9 miles of pipes between Pembury and Kipping's Cross Service Reservoir. Tim Allen from Kent Archaeological Project said: "We have found evidence of postholes, pits and ditches, probably part of an Iron Age dwelling, along with pieces of pottery that we can date to the late Iron Age. We also found evidence of a medieval enclosure further along the route and five circular, fire-scorched pits, probably parts of ancient hearths or kilns or evidence of charcoal production."

== Government ==
Pembury forms part of Tunbridge Wells Borough and is represented on the Borough Council by one Liberal Democrat and one Tunbridge Wells Alliance (TWA) councillor. Pembury falls within the Tunbridge Wells East ward of Kent County Council, where it is represented by a Liberal Democrat councillor. It is a part of Tunbridge Wells parliamentary constituency which is represented in the House of Commons by Mike Martin MP.

Pembury Parish Council was founded in 1895.

== Geography ==
Pembury is about 45 miles (72 kilometers) south-east of London and just over 2.5 miles (4.0 km) north-east of the nearest town, Tunbridge Wells.

=== Landscape ===
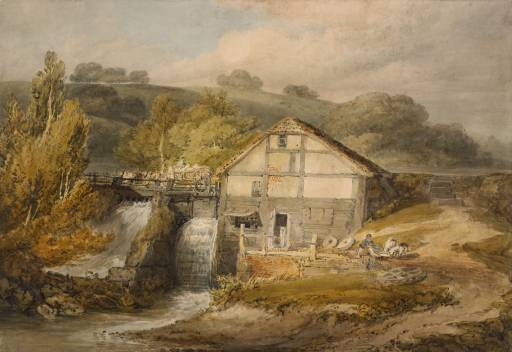
Keyes Mill, Pembury by J. M. W. Turner, c.1796

The village is within the High Weald Area of Outstanding Natural Beauty. The landscape around Pembury is dominated by steep-sided valleys and undulating slopes. The area is predominantly agricultural, with scattered copses and more extensive, usually deciduous woodland. Many local woodlands are used for coppicing.

With soils in the High Weald being relatively poor, early farming in the area would have been dominated by grazing. Between 1600 and 1800, agriculture grew to be the primary activity, with top fruits, cereals, coppicing and hops being the main products. Few hops are grown today, although the landscape continues to be dominated by fruit orchards.

=== Evolution of the village ===
Until the early 20th century, Pembury remained a small rural village, with five distinct hamlets: Upper Green, Lower Green, Hawkwell, Bo-Peep and Romford. These merged during the 20th century, particularly the latter half, when several large private housing estates were developed including Woodhill Park, Ridgeway and Beagleswood.

=== Village green ===
The village green, originally known as Copingcrouch Green, was first recorded on a map in 1629. The green was until recently dominated by a large horse chestnut tree and has developed as the focal point of the village. The Camden Arms hotel, which overlooks the green from its south side, was developed as a coaching inn to meet the needs of travellers along the London to Hastings road.

== Tunbridge Wells Hospital ==
The village is home to Tunbridge Wells Hospital, a large general hospital run by Maidstone and Tunbridge Wells NHS Trust. The hospital is located on the site of the former Pembury Hospital north-west of the main village on Tonbridge Road.

The new hospital was built by Laing O'Rourke at a cost of around £226 million. It opened in September 2011. The new hospital was the first acute NHS hospital in Britain where every inpatient has their own room with en-suite facilities, with ceiling to floor windows revealing views over surrounding woodland.

== Kent College ==
Kent College, Pembury is a girls' independent boarding and day school. It was established in Folkestone in 1886 by the Wesleyan Methodist Schools' Association, but moved to Pembury in 1939 and is now an interdenominational Christian school. The school occupies a Victorian manor house, set in a 75-acre estate, adjacent to Pembury Old Church.

== Listed buildings ==
=== War memorial ===
The War Memorial in Hastings Road was unveiled and dedicated on Sunday 25 September 1921 by Rev. Sinclair Brooke, Vicar of Pembury. The site was given by the Marquis Camden, and the Portland Stone Memorial stands 16 feet high and cost £365 19/4d, which apparently took quite a long time to raise. It was designed by well-known local Architects Ashley S. Kilby and the work was carried out by Messrs. Burslem and Sons of Tunbridge Wells.

In 1949 a metal plaque was placed over the original stone-carved names for the WW1 names and a new metal plaque below recorded the WW2 names. In 2012 local historian Richard Snow discovered 8 spelling errors and on 11 November 2018 the newly refurbished War Memorial stone-carved plaques were unveiled by the Deputy Lord Lieutenant of Kent, Lord Colgrain. The metal plaques were removed and replaced by newly carved stone plaques carried out by Burslems of Tunbridge Wells, who created the original plaques.

The old stone plaques were mounted on the playground wall of Pembury Primary School in February 2019.

== Demography ==
Pembury compared
2001 UK Census	Pembury	Tunbridge Wells district	England
Population	6,005	104,030	49,138,831
Foreign born	5.7%	7.1%	9.2%
White	97.5%	97.5%	90.9%
Asian	1.2%	1%	4.6%
Black	0.3%	0.3%	2.3%
Christian	76.3%	75%	71.7%
Muslim	0.4%	0.6%	3.1%
Hindu	0.4%	0.2%	1.1%
No religion	15.3%	16%	14.6%
Unemployed	1.6%	1.9%	3.3%
Retired	14.1%	13.3%	13.5%

At the 2001 UK census, the Pembury electoral ward had a population of 6,005. The ethnicity was 97.5% white, 0.8% mixed race, 1.2% Asian, 0.3% black and 0.2% other. The place of birth of residents was 94.3% United Kingdom, 0.5% Republic of Ireland, 1.5% other Western European countries, and 3.7% elsewhere. Religion was recorded as 76.3% Christian, 0.1% Buddhist, 0.4% Hindu, 0.1% Sikh, 0.1% Jewish, and 0.4% Muslim. 15.3% were recorded as having no religion, 0.1% had an alternative religion and 7.2% did not state their religion.

The economic activity of residents aged 16–74 was 41.7% in full-time employment, 14.3% in part-time employment, 11.1% self-employed, 1.6% unemployed, 2.6% students with jobs, 3% students without jobs, 14.1% retired, 6.8% looking after home or family, 3.1% permanently sick or disabled and 1.8% economically inactive for other reasons. The industry of employment of residents was 16.2% retail, 10.4% manufacturing, 7.8% construction, 13.4% real estate, 15.2% health and social work, 8.3% education, 6% transport and communications, 4.8% public administration, 3% hotels and restaurants, 7.9% finance, 1.8% agriculture and 5.2% other. Compared with national figures, the ward had a relatively high proportion of workers in finance, and health and social work. There were a relatively low proportion in manufacturing, and hotels and restaurants. Of the ward's residents aged 16–74, 22.2% had a higher education qualification or the equivalent, compared with 19.9% nationwide.

== Religious sites ==
=== The parish church of St Peter ===
Usually referred to as the "Old Church", the parish church is located in woods outside the village, near Kent College and the waterworks north of the A228. It was first built in the late 11th or early 12th century, although most of the present church was added in 1337.

=== The district church of St Peter ===
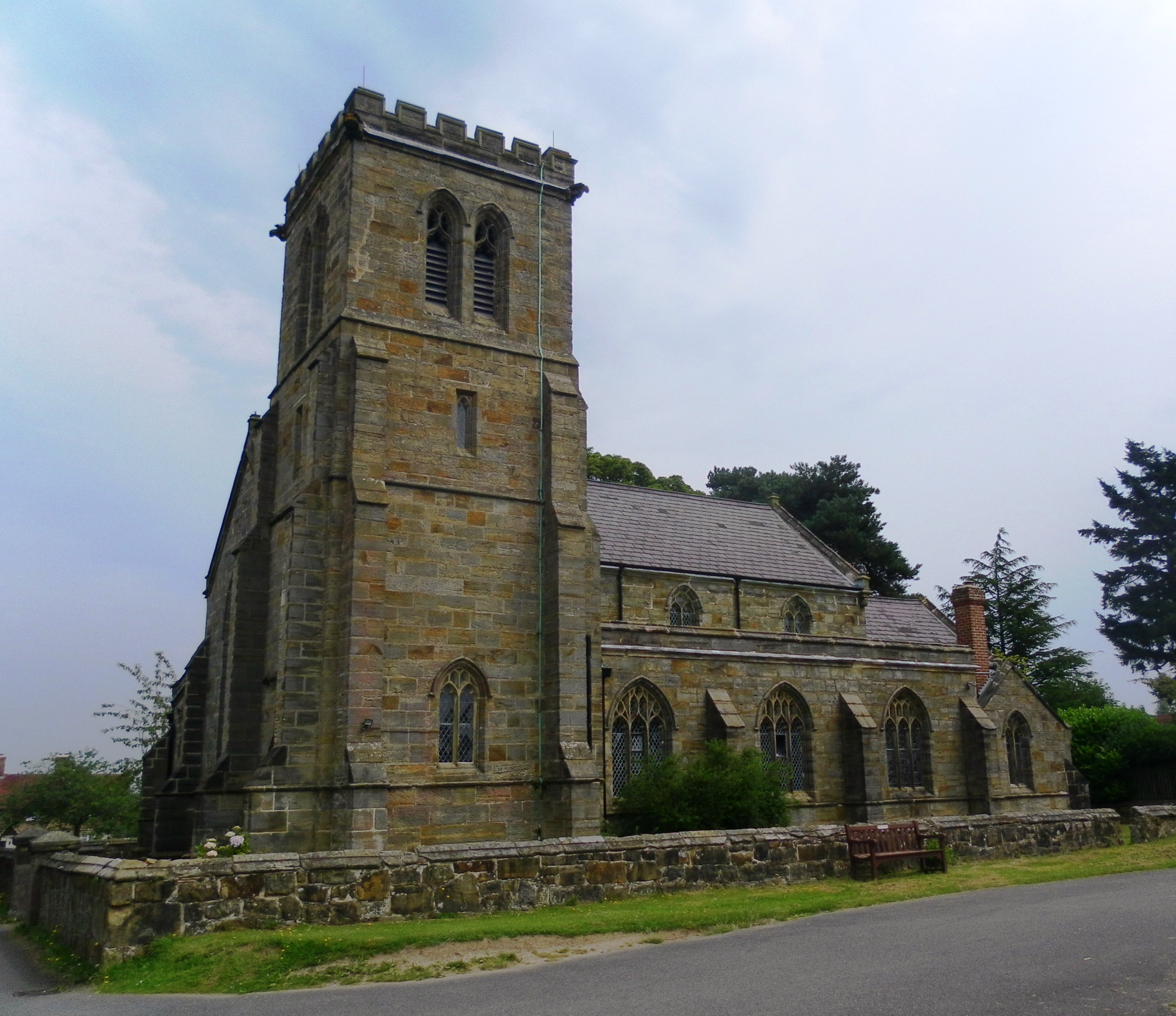
St Peter's Upper Church, Pembury

The District Church of St Peter, usually referred to as the "Upper Church" was built in 1847 on land donated by the Marquess Camden of Bayham. Built from local sandstone, also donated by the Marquess, it was erected on one of the highest points in the village. The church was built as a "Chapel of Ease" to serve the expanding communities around the village green who were some distance away from the old church.

The clock on the tower was added in 1872 to celebrate the 25th anniversary of the church. A 92 foot high spire was added to the tower in 1886 but was removed exactly one hundred years later as it had become unsafe.

=== Other churches ===
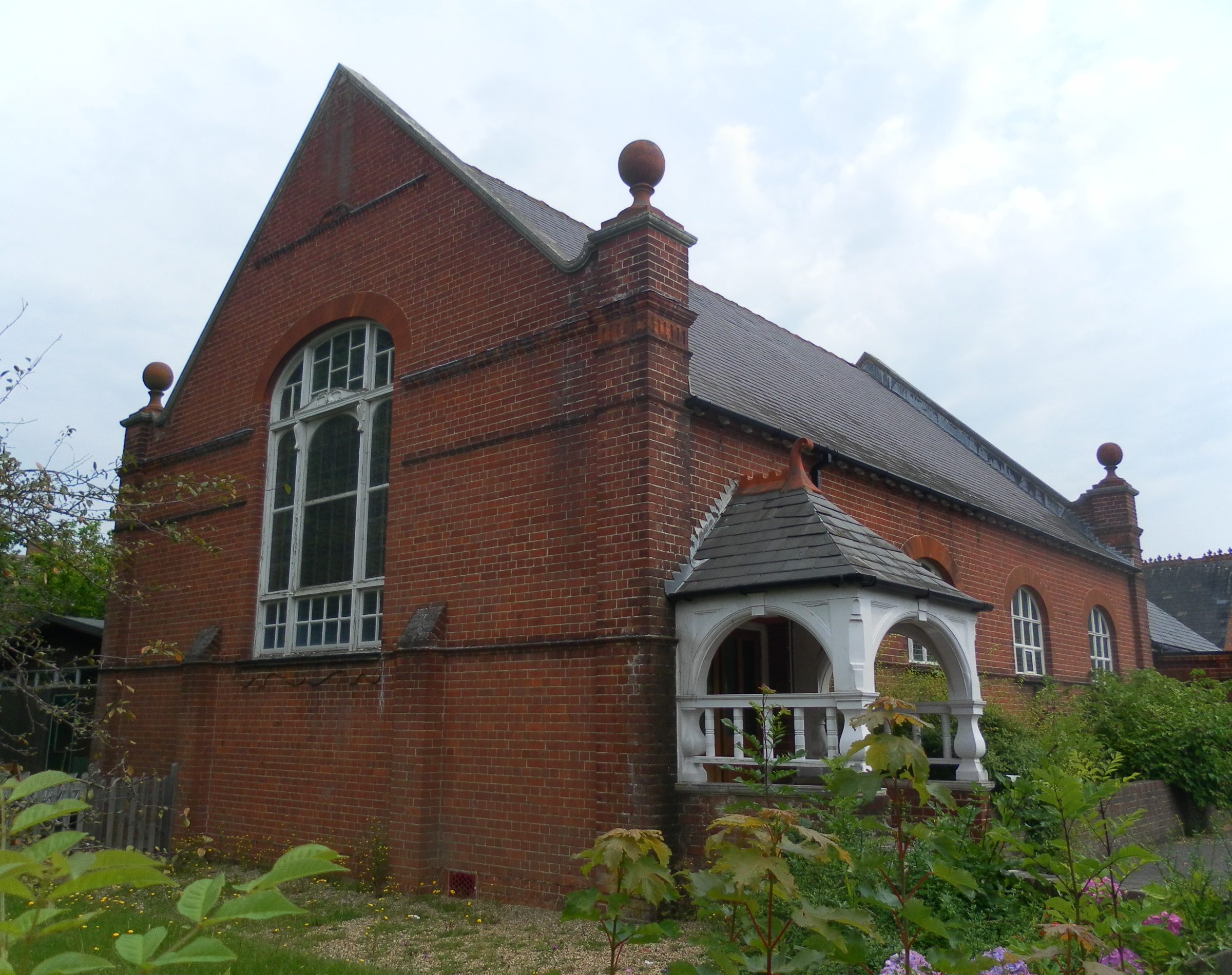
Pembury Baptist Church

Pembury Baptist Church is located in Romford Road.

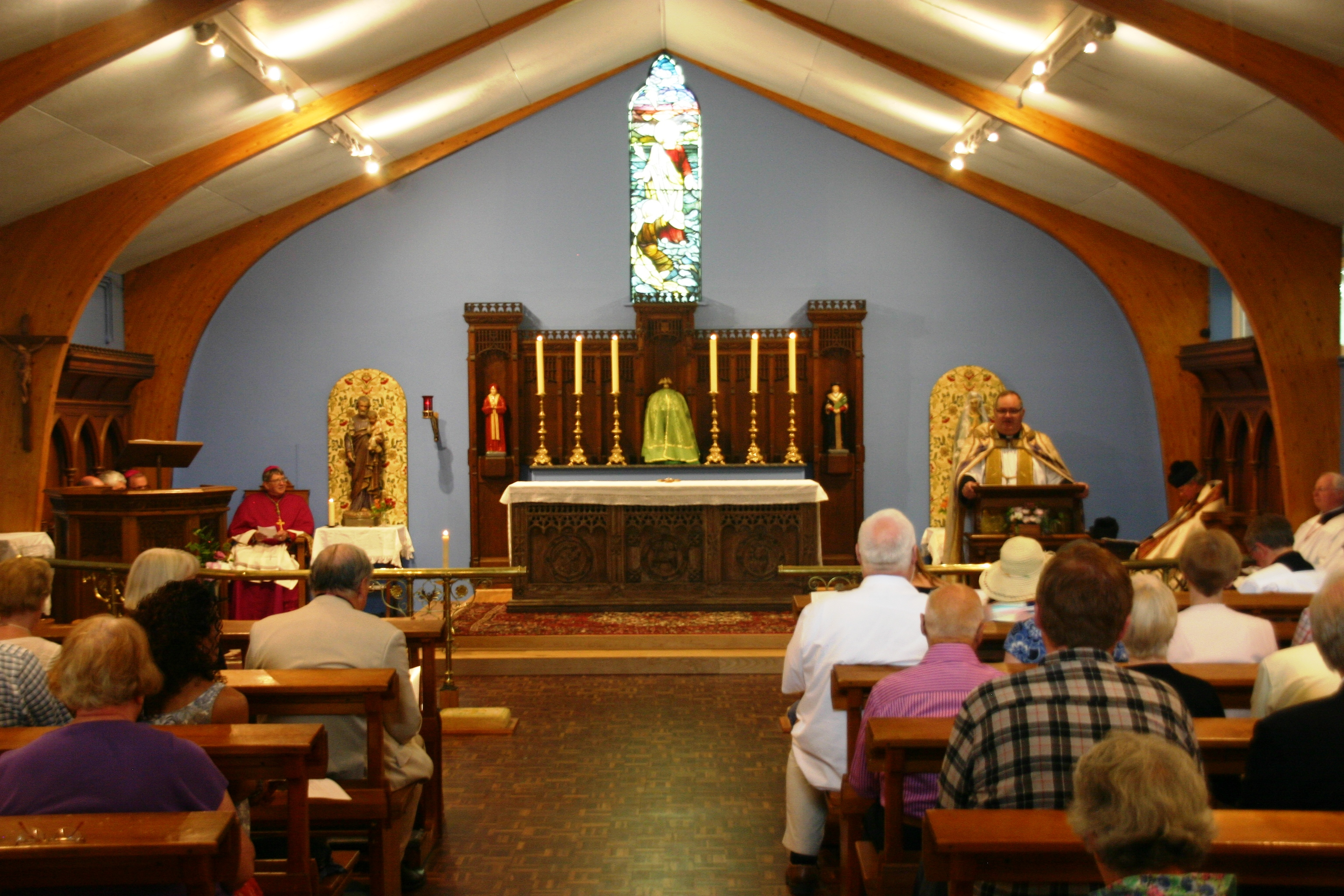

St Anselm Roman Catholic church is located on Lower Green Road, near the village green. A parish within the Archdiocese of Southwark, in 2011 it also became home to a group from the Ordinariate of Our Lady of Walsingham.

== Transport ==
Pembury has two bypasses, both constructed in the mid-1980s. The A21 bypass is a dual-carriageway road running through lower ground to the south of the village between the Longfield Road roundabout near North Farm, Tunbridge Wells and the Kippings Cross roundabout to the east of the village. Prior to the construction of this bypass, vehicles travelling between London and Hastings had to drive through the village centre via the High Street and Hastings Road.

The A228 bypass is a single-carriageway road passing through woodland to the north and west of the village, linking Woodsgate Corner and the A264 with Maidstone Road at the northern end of the village near Pippins Farm and Downingbury Farm.

Pembury is not directly served by rail, the nearest stations being at Tunbridge Wells, High Brooms, Tonbridge and Paddock Wood.

A segregated cycle route links Pembury to Tunbridge Wells town centre.

== Notable people ==
- Sam Billings (b. 1991), cricketer
- Rob Cross (b. 1990), professional darts player, 2018 PDC World Champion
- Charles Ellison (b. 1962), cricketer
- Victorine Foot (1920−2000), painter
- Andy Foster (b. 1961), Mayor of Wellington, New Zealand (2019–2022)
- Kelly Holmes (b. 1970), athlete
- Shane MacGowan (1957–2023), lead singer of The Pogues, born in Pembury
- Richard Miles (b. 1969), historian and archaeologist
- Jamie Philpot (b. 1996), professional footballer
- Tom Probert (b. 1986), cricketer
- Michel Roux, Jr. (b. 1960), chef, born in Pembury
- Tommy Searle (b. 1989), professional motocross racer
- Ed Smith (b. 1977), cricketer, journalist and author, born in Pembury
- Leon Vynehall, producer and DJ
- Danny Webb (b. 1991), professional motorcycle racer, lives in Pembury
- Jonny Williams (b. 1993), professional footballer, born in Pembury
- Michael Yardy (b. 1980), cricketer, born in Pembury
