= North Kent Line =

British railway line

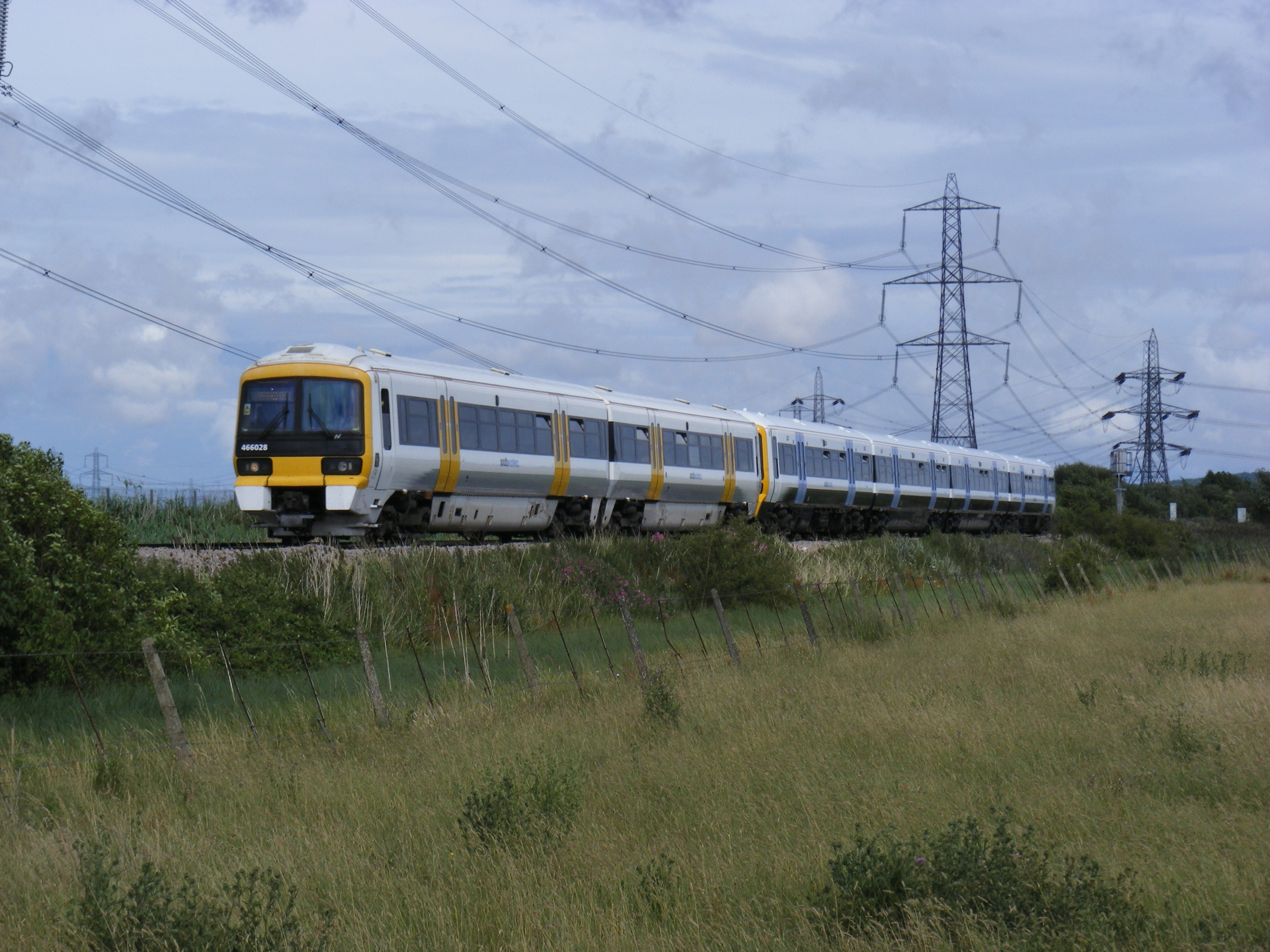
- A Southeastern Class 466 passing Milton Range in 2011

Overview
- Status: Operational
- Owner: Network Rail
- Locale: Greater London; South East England
- Termini: Lewisham; Rochester

Service
- Type: Commuter rail, suburban rail
- System: National Rail
- Operators: Southeastern; Thameslink
- Depots: Slade Green; Grove Park; Gillingham
- Rolling stock: Class 375 "Electrostar"; Class 376 "Electrostar"; Class 377 "Electrostar"; Class 395 "Javelin"; Class 465 "Networker"; Class 466 "Networker"; Class 700 "Desiro City"; Class 707 "City Beam"

Technical
- Line length: 27mi 34ch (44.13 km)
- Number of tracks: 2
- Track gauge: 1,435 mm (4 ft 8 1/2 in) standard gauge
- Electrification: 750 V DC third rail
- Operating speed: 70 mph (110 km/h)
Route map
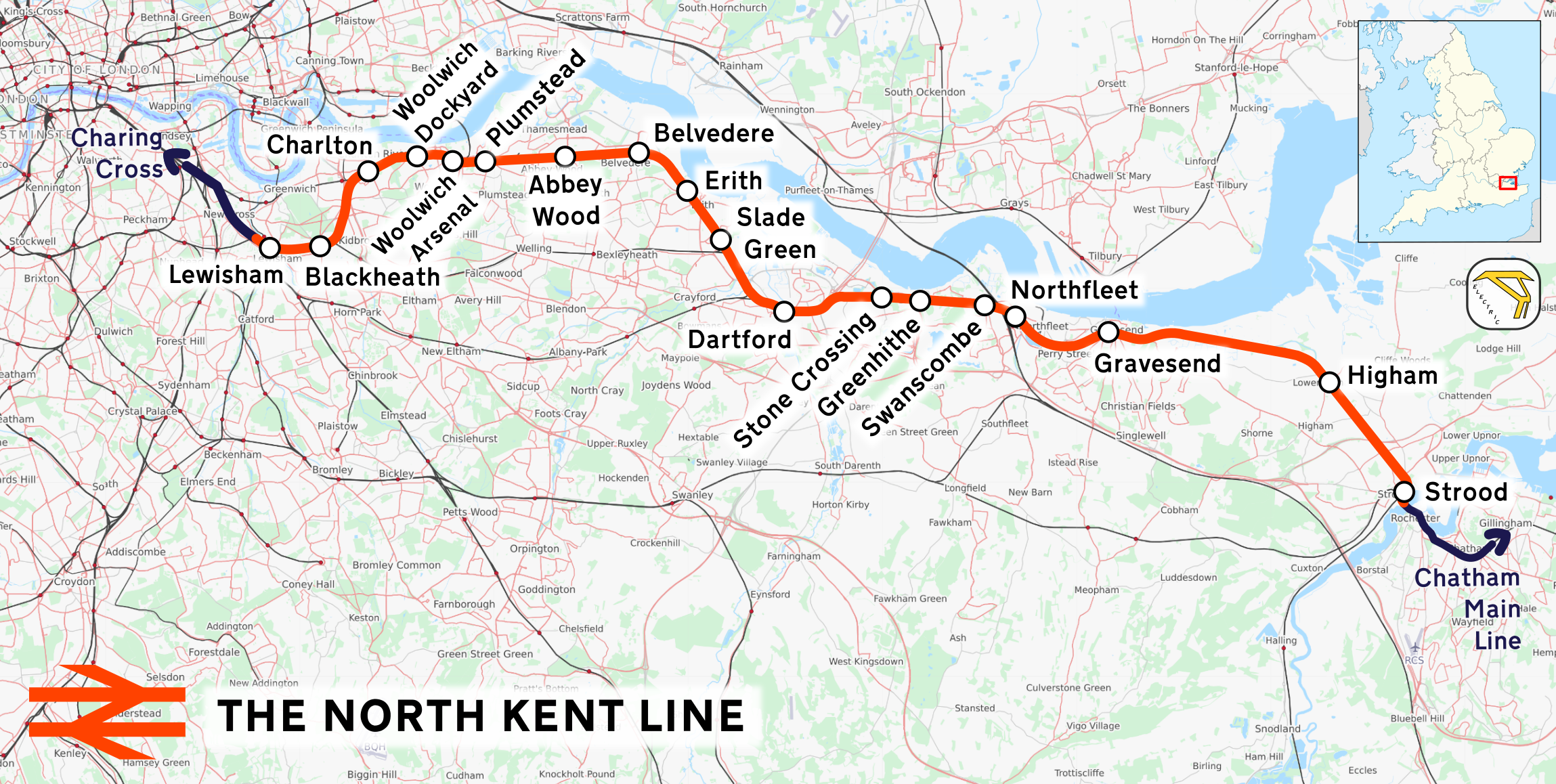

The North Kent Line is a railway line which branches off the South East Main Line at St Johns junction west of Lewisham station in Greater London and runs to Rochester Bridge Junction near Strood, Medway where it links to the Chatham Main Line.

The section from Charlton to Dartford is also referred to as the "Woolwich Line" in the context of Southeastern Metro services.

== History ==
=== Construction ===
The North Kent Line was the means by which the South Eastern Railway (SER) was able to connect its system to London at London Bridge. In 1846 the SER purchased the Thames and Medway Canal tunnel near Higham and laid railway tracks through it; in 1847 trains were working through from the Strood terminus, on the River Medway to Gravesend. From 30 July 1849 the line was extended, via Blackheath, to a junction with the London and Greenwich Railway at North Kent East Junction, near Deptford, and through trains were now able to operate.

=== Electrification ===
The line is electrified (750 V DC third rail). Electrification was initially to Dartford (6 June 1926) and was extended to Gillingham by World War Two.

=== Former services ===
From 1999 until 2002, there were semi-fast trains running from Plumstead to London Victoria, temporarily resuming a 1980s service pattern. This service was for the Millennium Dome; trains called at Woolwich Arsenal, Charlton, Blackheath, Lewisham, Peckham Rye, then ran non-stop to London Victoria. There was also an early morning semi-fast service to London Blackfriars from Dartford in the 1980s.

In 2003, there were plans to run a Plumstead to Clapham Junction service across South London which had never came to fruition.

Until May 2018, there were regular semi-fast services to Gillingham (Kent) from London Charing Cross via Lewisham (for DLR) and Woolwich Arsenal (for DLR) operated by Southeastern calling at Waterloo East, London Bridge then non-stop to Lewisham (for DLR), Blackheath, Charlton, Woolwich Arsenal (for DLR), Abbey Wood (for Elizabeth line), Dartford, Greenhithe (for Bluewater), Gravesend and then all stations to Gillingham (Kent). Since then, these services were replaced by the new Thameslink services from Luton calling at all but some stations to Rainham (Kent).

== Route ==
The line diverges from the Southeastern Main Line at Lewisham Vale junction at the south-east end of St Johns railway station, and runs as far as Rochester Bridge junction beside the River Medway on the north coast of mid-Kent.

== Services ==
The North Kent Line is a high-frequency line, with all stations in the London area being served by at least 4 trains per hour, with Lewisham having 14tph.

London Cannon Street to Dartford 2tph, calling at , London Bridge, New Cross, St Johns, Lewisham(for DLR), Blackheath, Charlton, Woolwich Dockyard, Woolwich Arsenal (for DLR), Plumstead, Abbey Wood (for Elizabeth Line) Belvedere, Erith, Slade Green and Dartford.

London Cannon Street to Slade Green all stations via Greenwich 4tph, of which 2tph continue back to Cannon Street via Bexleyheath and Lewisham on the Bexleyheath line and 2tph to Cannon Street via Sidcup and Hither Green on the Dartford Loop Line.

Luton to Rainham 2tph, Semi Fast calling all stations to West Hampstead Thameslink, St Pancras International, Farringdon, City Thameslink, London Blackfriars, London Bridge, Deptford, Greenwich (for DLR), Maze Hill, Westcombe Park, Charlton, Woolwich Arsenal (for DLR), Plumstead, Abbey Wood (for Elizabeth Line), Slade Green, Dartford, Stone Crossing, Greenhithe (for Bluewater), Swanscombe, Northfleet, Gravesend and all stations to Rainham.

=== Service patterns ===
As of May 2019, the service pattern in trains per hour (tph):

Off-peak & Saturday:

- 2 tph between Luton & Rainham via Greenwich (Semi-Fast)
- 2 tph between London Cannon Street & Slade Green via Greenwich, continuing to London Cannon Street via the Bexleyheath Line (stopping service)(Also runs 2tph via Bexleyheath first and then via Greenwich)
- 2 tph between London Cannon Street & Slade Green via Greenwich, continuing to London Cannon Street via the Dartford Loop Line (stopping service)(Also runs 2tph via the Dartford Loop Line first and then via Greenwich)
- 2 tph between London Charing Cross & Dartford via Lewisham & Woolwich Arsenal
- 2 tph between London Charing Cross & Dartford via Bexleyheath
- 2 tph between London Charing Cross & Gravesend via Dartford Loop Line (Fast service)
- 2 tph between London Charing Cross & Dartford via Dartford Loop Line (Semi-Fast)
- 2 tph between St Pancras International & Ramsgate, continuing to St Pancras International via the Kent Coast Line and High Speed One, via High Speed One

Sunday:

- 2 tph between London Cannon Street & Dartford via Greenwich (stopping service)
- 2 tph between London Charing Cross & Dartford via Lewisham and Woolwich Arsenal
- 2 tph between Kentish Town & Rainham via Greenwich (Semi-Fast)

Peak hour frequencies vary, with services from the Bexleyheath and Dartford loop lines also running to and from stations to Gillingham.

== Future ==
Abbey Wood station has been rebuilt to become the eastern terminus of the Elizabeth Line. However, a possible extension of the Elizabeth line to Gravesend has been safeguarded.

== Stations ==
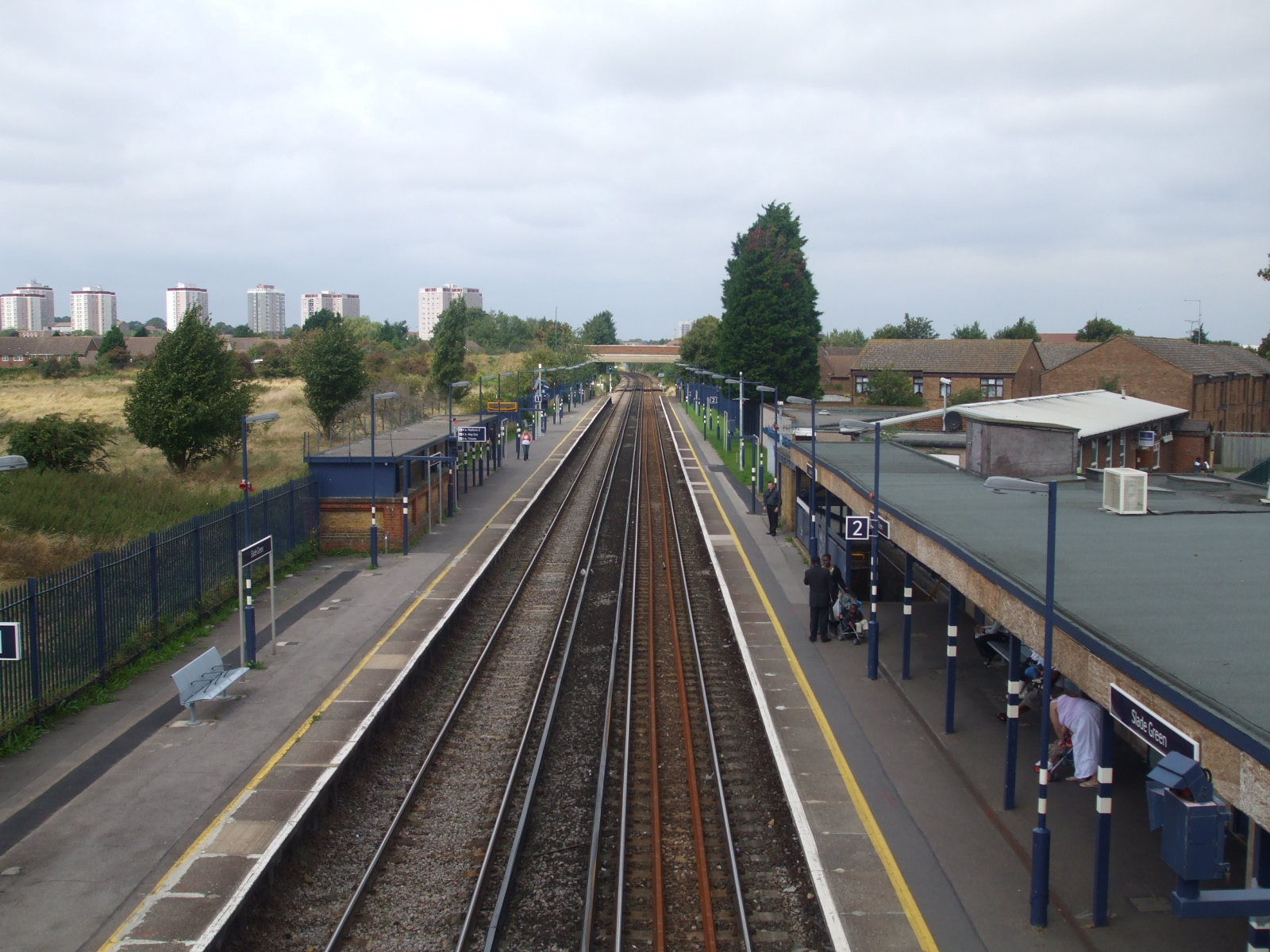
Slade Green station

Train services working the Line today take the following route; the first ten miles (16 km) passes through many tunnels, included on the list:

- Lewisham
- Blackheath – here is the junction for the Bexleyheath line
  - Blackheath Tunnel [1 mile (1.6 km) in length]
  - here is the freight branch to Angerstein Wharf
  - junction for the line from Greenwich and the eastern connection with the London and Greenwich Railway, opened in 1878
- Charlton
  - Charlton Tunnel [154 yd; 141 m]
  - Mount Street Tunnel [121 yd; 111 m]
  - Dockyard Tunnel [121 yd; 111 m]
- Woolwich Dockyard
  - Coleman Street Tunnel [89 yd; 81 m]
  - George IV Tunnel [238 yd; 218 m]
  - Calderwood Street Tunnel [58 yd; 53 m]
  - Cross Street Tunnel [134 yd; 123 m]
- Woolwich Arsenal
- Plumstead – here the Royal Arsenal railway system connected with the main line
- Church Manor Way Halt – closed
- Abbey Wood
- Belvedere
- Erith
- Slade Green -includes the large carriage-servicing depot
  - here is the triangular junction with the Bexleyheath line
  - here is the triangular junction with the Dartford Loop Line
- Dartford
- Stone Crossing
- Greenhithe, subtitled "for Bluewater"
  - Greenhithe Tunnel [253 yd; 231 m]
- Swanscombe
- Northfleet – this station is only 305m or so from Ebbsfleet International c. 800m by foot.
- Gravesend: was originally named Gravesend Central to differentiate it from the ex-London, Chatham and Dover Railway station at Gravesend West which closed in 1968
- Milton Road Halt-closed
- Denton Halt- closed
- Milton Range Halt-closed
- Hoo Junction Staff Halt, where the line branches ("The Hundred of Hoo Railway") to Grain. Currently for freight services (not electrified)
- Higham
  - Higham and Strood tunnel – actually two tunnels [total 3,931 yd; 3,595 m] with a gap of 100 yards (91 m) between.
- Strood – the junction for the Medway Valley Line.

The North Kent Line connects with the LCDR Chatham Main Line at Rochester Bridge Junction, about 200 m beyond Strood station. It totals some 30 miles (48 km) in length.
