= Hundred of Hoo Railway =

Railway line in Kent, England

Overview
- Status: Operational
- Owner: Network Rail
- Locale: Kent; South East England

Service
- Type: Freight rail
- System: National Rail

History
- Opened: 1882; 144 years ago
- Closed: 4 December 1961; 64 years ago to passenger service

Technical
- Track gauge: 1,435 mm (4 ft 8 1/2 in) standard gauge

The Hundred of Hoo Railway is a railway line in Kent, England, following the North Kent Line from Gravesend before diverging at Hoo Junction near Shorne Marshes and continuing in an easterly direction across the Hoo Peninsula, passing near the villages of Cooling, High Halstow, Cliffe and Stoke before reaching the Isle of Grain and the container port on its eastern tip, Thamesport. There used to be a short branch line leading from Stoke Junction to the coastal town of Allhallows but this closed from 4 December 1961, the same date on which the Hundred of Hoo line was closed to passenger services.

== Early history ==
=== Authorisation ===
North Kent Railway Extension Railway Act 1865
- Act of Parliament
- Parliament of the United Kingdom
- Long title: An Act to authorize the Construction of a Railway from the North Kent Railway to the Medway, and of a Pier in that River; and for other Purposes.
- Citation: 28 & 29 Vict. c. ccclxxv
- Territorial extent: United Kingdom

Dates
- Royal assent: 6 July 1865
- Commencement: 6 July 1865 (Note: The Acts of Parliament (Commencement) Act 1793.)
- Repealed: 31 January 2013

Other legislation
- Repealed by: Statute Law (Repeals) Act 2013

Status: Repealed

The first authorisation to construct a railway on the Hoo Peninsula was obtained by a group of local businessmen who sponsored the passing of the North Kent Railway Extension Railway Act 1865 (28 & 29 Vict. c. ccclxxv) which provided for the construction of a branch line leaving the South Eastern Railway's Gravesend to Strood line at Denton. The line would head eastwards across land north of Cliffe to reach the Isle of Grain. However, the major railway companies operating in the area, South Eastern Railway (SER) and the London, Chatham and Dover Railway (LCDR) were not interested in the project and as a result it failed to secure the necessary funding.

The opening of Queenborough railway station on 15 May 1876 by the LCDR which offered a sea link to the Dutch town of Flushing prompted the SER to investigate possibilities for a rival link to the continent. On 16 April 1878 the SER's engineer, Francis Brady, reported back to his employer on the feasibility of constructing a railway from a point near Gravesend and the North Kent Line to the village of Stoke, a distance of 9 miles. The estimated cost was £72,000. A 5% return was projected, the belief being that Gravesend's proximity to London would make it a more desirable outlet for the distribution of goods intended for the Kent area, rather than the LCDR's Chatham station.

Hundred of Hoo Railway Act 1879 (Note: Section 1.)
- Act of Parliament
- Parliament of the United Kingdom
- Long title: An Act for making a railway in the county of Kent to be called the Hundred of Hoo Railway; and for other purposes.
- Citation: 42 & 43 Vict. c. cxxvi
- Territorial extent: United Kingdom

Dates
- Royal assent: 21 July 1879
- Commencement: 21 July 1879

Status: Current legislation

Text of statute as originally enacted

The Hundred of Hoo Railway Company was therefore formed and a second authorisation for the line obtained in the form of the Hundred of Hoo Railway Act 1879 (42 & 43 Vict. c. cxxvi) which received royal assent on 21 July 1879.

=== Extension to Port Victoria ===
Seizing the opportunity to provide a sea outlet for goods to Europe, the SER announced its intention to open a new port on the Isle of Grain with a service to Belgium. This new service would compete with the LCDR's own Queenborough and Sheerness outlets. The SER was hopeful that its service would be preferred over that of the LCDR, the proposed route from Charing Cross to the new port was 40 miles, some 12 miles less than the LCDR's Victoria to Queenborough or Sheerness service.

Hundred of Hoo Railway (Extension) Act 1880
- Act of Parliament
- Parliament of the United Kingdom
- Long title: An Act to authorise the Hundred of Hoo Railway Company to extend their Railway by the making of a further Line of Railway, and also a jetty, pier, or landing-place, in the county of Kent, to raise further Money; and for other purposes.
- Citation: 43 & 44 Vict. c. cxvii
- Territorial extent: United Kingdom

Dates
- Royal assent: 2 August 1880
- Commencement: 2 August 1880

Status: Current legislation

Text of statute as originally enacted

The Hundred of Hoo Railway (Extension) Act 1880 (43 & 44 Vict. c. cxvii) was passed by the House of Lords on 14 July 1880 authorising an extension of 3 miles from Stoke to the new Victoria Port where a pier would be constructed. Following a call for tenders, the quotation of a certain Thomas A. Walker was accepted, he having proposed £14,421 for the railway extension (including a bridge over Higham Canal) and £18,953 for the pier. The railway company was absorbed into SER in August 1880.

=== Opening and initial services ===
A single track line as far as Sharnal Street opened on 1 April 1882. The remainder of the line to Port Victoria opened on 11 September 1882.

When the line opened, the scope for passenger services was limited - the entire population of the sparsely populated Hoo Peninsula was only 3,405. Nevertheless, in October 1891 there were 9 daily trains, approximately one every two hours from 6am on weekdays and Saturdays, and three on Sundays. The total journey time was 1 hour. Down trains would depart from Gravesend and call at Sharnal Street and Port Victoria, before a ferry would take passengers across the River Medway on to Sheerness. From Sheerness passengers could take the Medway Ferry Service to Folkestone and then on to the continent.

The ferry service was intermittent. It was discontinued in 1895 due to dwindling returns and then reinstated some years later; when there was no service to Port Victoria, trains terminated at Sharnal Street. The initial returns for the line as a whole were below expectations: without a direct ferry connection to the continent there was little to attract customers to this remote region. Nevertheless, the farming community on Hoo took well to the new railway and Sharnal Street station saw good business.

=== New stations ===
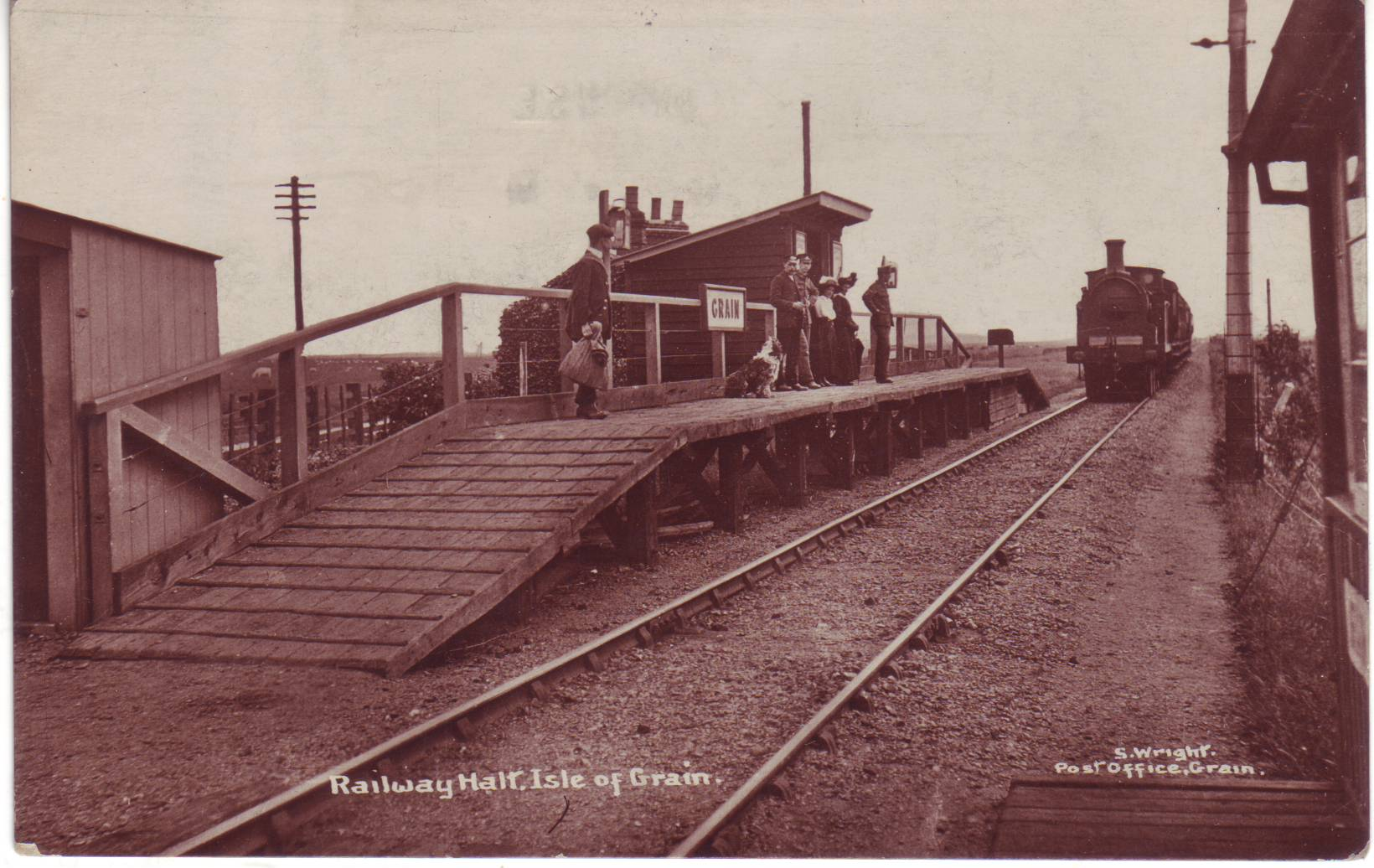
Grain Halt Station postcard

By 1906 it had become clear that Port Victoria would not develop into a major continental sea port and the South Eastern and Chatham Railway (SECR) began to look for new opportunities to bring in revenue. In July that year, seven wooden halts were constructed: Milton Road, Milton Range, Denton, Uralite, Beluncle, Middle Stoke and Grain Crossing. Uralite halt was named after the nearby British Uralite Ltd complex which had opened in 1899 and manufactured drainage pipes from wet asbestos paste. On 1 May 1915, the little-used Milton Road Halt was closed. The branch line to Allhallows-on-sea was opened on 16 May 1932, followed on 17 July 1932 by opening of another halt at Stoke Junction. A new station opened at Grain on 3 September 1951, replacing Grain Crossing Halt, which closed to rail traffic on 11 July 1951 and passengers on 3 September 1951 - a bus service being provided between those dates. The new Grain station was 300 metres (330 yd) west of Grain Crossing Halt.

Point	Coordinates (Links to map resources)	OS Grid Ref	Notes
Gravesend Central	51.441317°N 0.366692°E	TQ6446374080	
Milton Road Halt	51.438991°N 0.381242°E	TQ6548273854	1906–1915
Denton Halt	51.4413°N 0.3996°E	TQ6674974153	1906–1961
Milton Range Halt	51.4381°N 0.421°E	TQ6824873846	1906–1932
Hoo Junction Staff Halt	51.4364°N 0.439°E	TQ69507369	From 1956
Uralite Halt	51.436731°N 0.447314°E	TQ7008273754	1906–1961
Cliffe	51.44552°N 0.499595°E	TQ7368174854	1882–1961
High Halstow Halt	51.447005°N 0.553917°E	TQ7744975150	1906–1961
Sharnal Street	51.439378°N 0.57364°E	TQ7868074354	1882–1961
Beluncle Halt	51.4337°N 0.593512°E	TQ8018078754	1906–1961
Middle Stoke Halt	51.447018°N 0.636408°E	TQ8318075354	1906–1961
Stoke Junction Halt	51.449389°N 0.650938°E	TQ8418075654	1932–1961
Allhallows-on-Sea	51.473607°N 0.653782°E	TQ8428078354	1932–1961
Yantlet Creek (Admiralty)	51.470605°N 0.670956°E	TQ85607800	
Grain Crossing Halt	51.44604°N 0.679529°E	TQ8618075354	1906–1951
Grain	51.443148°N 0.687995°E	TQ8677975054	1951–1961
London Thamesport	51.440278°N 0.6875°E	TQ8675774734	
Port Victoria	51.432°N 0.7027°E	TQ8784773852	1882–1951

== Port Victoria and pier ==
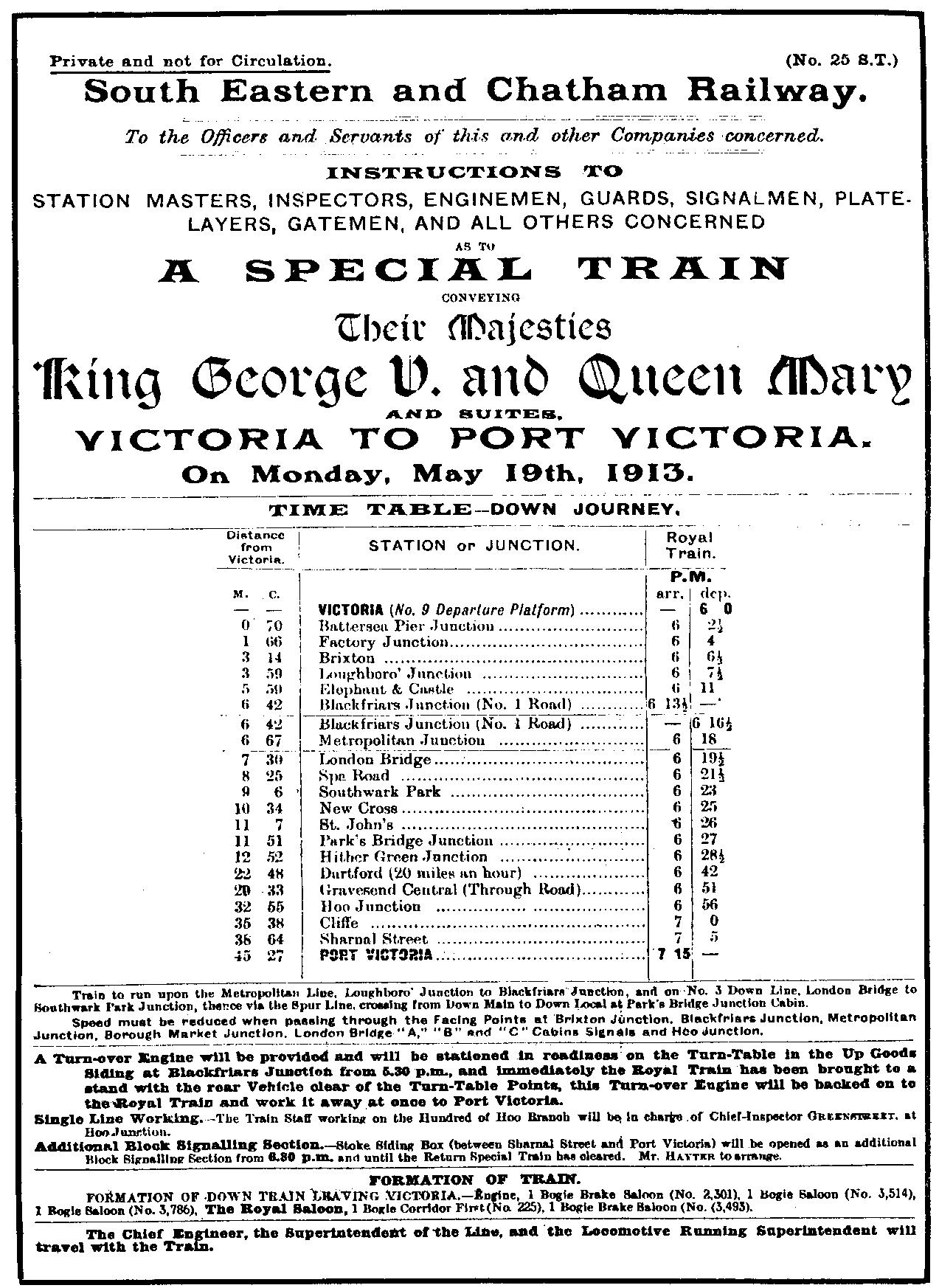
Royal Train en route to Port Victoria, 19 May 1913

=== Construction ===
Port Victoria station was located at the head of the 400 ft (122 m) long pier. Ships of up to 18 ft (5.49 m) draught were able to draw-up alongside to take passengers and goods, irrespective of the tides, thanks to the pier's deep water front. A 'temporary' hotel was constructed near the pier at a cost of £1,900.

The station became popular with the Royal Family. This was because it was an isolated location. Both the Royal Train and the Royal Yacht were regular visitors to Port Victoria.

=== Maintenance ===
In 1896 it was discovered that the pier needed urgent remedial works, marine worms having infested the wooden piles. Extensive works were undertaken only for the pier to be damaged again, this time by a heavy storm on 28 November 1896. Further repairs were necessary and the service to Port Victoria became intermittent, closing in the winter months with trains terminating at Sharnal Halt. In 1901 the wooden piles of the pier were encased in concrete in an attempt to prevent further infestation, but problems continued after the area around the pier was dredged, thereby exposing the uncased parts of the piers to investigation.

=== 1899-1918 ===
Following the merger of the SER and LCDR in 1899, Port Victoria found itself firmly in second place behind Queenborough for traffic to the continent. It was only when Queenborough was unavailable that Port Victoria saw regular sustained use. This was the case when a fire caused serious damage to Queenborough Pier on 19 July 1900 and services were diverted via Port Victoria for the best part of the next three years - the busiest period in its history.

Following the outbreak of the First World War, the Admiralty took over Port Victoria on 11 August 1914 at a rent of £200 per annum for a lease of 14 years. A siding to Yantlet Creek was laid and artillery testing was carried out there. The Royal Naval Air Service took over the Royal Corinthian Yacht Club's headquarters which were located near the pier.

=== Decline ===
As the popularity of the new extension to Allhallows, opened in 1932, began to grow, the further decline of Port Victoria became ever more pronounced. During the 1930s, it saw only two trains per day, mainly for the workmen at the refineries on the Isle of Grain - the Medway Oil and Storage Company had been based at Elphinstone Point at the entrance to Colemouth Creek since 1923. Nevertheless, the Flushing Night Mail continued to dock at the port.

In 1932 further concerns about the stability of the pier led to the buffer being brought further forward so that only 93 ft (28 m) of railway covered the 400 ft (120 m) pier. The station was replaced the same year by a modest structure at a cost of £395. The following year the old station buildings on the pier were demolished and new fencing was erected to create a gangway on the pier in order to provide access to the navigation lights. The 1930s also saw the demolition of the old Royal Corinthian Yacht Club.

The end finally came in 1941 when its seaward end (measuring some 516 ft or 157 m) was demolished and sold for scrap to the Admiralty for £841 5s. Only a short length at the shore end now remained. Both Port Victoria Station and the previous station, Grain Crossing Halt, closed to rail traffic (but not passengers) on 11 June 1951. A new station, called "Grain", which became the line's terminus, was constructed in their place. The Port Victoria Hotel was one of the last pier buildings to be swept away in 1951.

== Extension to Allhallows ==
=== Historical context ===
With the failure of Port Victoria to become the valuable European seaport that had been expected, alternative means of increasing the revenue from the line were sought. Such an opportunity seemed to present itself in the early 1920s with the popularity of seaside resorts as holiday destinations for middle and working-class families with the financial means to take an annual holiday or weekend breaks. Resorts such as Brighton, Torquay and Blackpool had long been popular with seasiders since the mid-19th century, but it was only with the arrival of the railway that factory workers in London could enjoy the privileges previously reserved for the richer classes and use their free weekends to escape from their urban environment.

The Southern Railway (SR), which had taken over the SECR's activities in 1923 following the grouping ordered by the Railways Act 1921, sought to profit from this new market by offering a seaside destination within easy reach of London which would rival the London, Midland and Scottish Railway's line to Southend-on-Sea. The small village of Allhallows, population 261 in the 1880s, was identified as the only feasible location for a new seaside resort in North Kent - Herne Bay being judged too far from London and Leysdown-on-Sea on the Isle of Sheppey not having a direct rail service.

=== Authorisation and construction ===
In June 1929, a Ministry of Transport railway order was obtained by the SR and construction began in August 1931. The branch line to Allhallows was 1¾ miles long, joining the existing line between Middle Stoke and Grain Crossing Halts. Like the line to Port Victoria, the connection with Allhallows would also consist of a single track.

An article published in April 1932 in the Southern Railway Magazine indicated the SR's aspirations for the line: "[n]ear the small village of Allhallows, amid fields where cattle graze and the ploughman walks his furrow, workmen are busy constructing roads and laying the main drains and conduits for the gas, water, telephone and electric light services to houses of which not a brick has yet been laid. In contrast to the urban development of an earlier day, the prospective house-purchaser (and season-ticket holder) at Allhallows will approach his future home from a modern reinforced concrete carriageway, instead of stumbling through the ruts of an unmade road."

The Allhallows-on-Sea Estate Company was incorporated with the intention of transforming the flat, featureless, windswept marshland in the area into a new holiday resort. The SR had a financial interest in the new company and worked closely with it in the construction of the line. The new company 'donated' land for use as railway and contributed £20,000 towards the construction of the line.

=== Opening and early days ===
The ceremonial opening of the extension took place on Whit Saturday 14 May 1932 when 700 day-trippers made the journey to Allhallows on a special train laid on from London drawn by R1 Class 0-4-4T No. 380. The first passenger trains ran on the following bank holiday Monday, 16 May, with local trains starting from and returning to Gravesend Central. Cheap day return tickets from Charing Cross were offered at 5s 3d - the cheapest ticket to a Kentish seaside resort. To coincide with the opening of the new connection, other parts of the line were upgraded. At Stoke Junction, where the line to Allhallows branched off, a new halt was opened on 17 July 1932. At Cliffe and Sharnal Street, platforms were constructed, whilst at Uralite, High Halstow, Beluncle and Middle Stoke halts, concrete platforms replaced the timber ones.

Two daily express services from Allhallows to Charing Cross were laid on at 7.36am and 8.28am, returning in the early evenings on weekdays and at midday on Saturdays, as if to demonstrate the village's potential as a commuter hub. The services were hardly used, the envisaged commuter town not having yet been constructed, and the SR ran them until September, planning to re-introduce them permanently when the town was ready.

The line became increasingly popular for daytrips: on Sundays during July, August and September 1934 alone, 72,557 passengers used the line, compared with 62,120 for the same period in 1933. On Bank Holiday Sunday 5 August 1934, over 9,500 passengers made the journey to and from Allhallows. It became necessary to double the line between Allhallows and Stoke Junction, the single platform at Allhallows becoming an island with an extended platform canopy. The platform at Allhallows could accommodate ten-coach trains, and goods facilities were provided in the shape of goods sidings, a large goods shed and a turntable - none of which saw much use.

By 1939 between ten and twelve trains were laid on each way on weekdays from Gravesend, and there was an excursion from Maze Hill in August. On Sundays, seven trains were provided, with six extra during the peak holiday season.

=== Decline ===
Allhallows's popularity continued up until the outbreak of the Second World War, with 12 trains making the journey to and from Gravesend during weekdays while extra services were laid on for Sundays - 14 down and 11 up. At this time the SR considered electrification of the entire Hundred of Hoo line but ultimately decided against it.

In the frugal years that followed the end of the war, Allhallows, like Leysdown-on-Sea, began to experience lean times as passenger numbers fell. Allhallows with its single Charrington's pub, concrete road, two small refreshment stands (closed in winter) and block of four small shops (which never saw any real use and were eventually bricked up) was no match for Brighton, the attractions of which could be enjoyed by rail for an extra 1s 9d when compared to the price of an Allhallows ticket (then 5s 9d). In an attempt to stem losses, the new operator, British Railways (Southern Region) (BR), misguidedly tried out an ACV lightweight diesel railcar in late 1953, its noise and general lack of comfort probably serving however to drive away more passengers.

In the February 1954 edition of Trains Illustrated, T.J. Norris noted that many of the trains from Allhallows carried 20 or so of passengers, most of whom went only as far as Cliffe. Whilst Summer and bank holidays saw some patronage of the line - an excursion train from London ran three days each week, with extra trains on Sundays and bank holidays, Winter presented a different picture with trains continuing beyond Sharnal Street being almost completely empty.

Nevertheless, BR still tried to promote the area for holiday-makers and potential residents as its Holiday Haunts guide for 1955 demonstrates: "[t]he open fields, the views, the sands and the safe bathing attract may day and weekend visitors. Undoubtedly, Allhallows has a future; roads have been laid out and it is certain that the place will develop as a pleasant, rural type of resort."

By 1955 eleven trains ran each way on weekdays, with twelve down and thirteen up on Saturdays and thirteen up and down on Sundays. In 1957, the line between Stoke Junction and Allhallows was reduced to a single track and in 1959, the Hundred of Hoo line was excluded from the Kent Coast electrification programme which saw the North Kent Line electrified.

In line with the 1955 Modernisation Plan, by 1961 most passenger trains on the branch were diesel powered, although some were still operated by H Class 0-4-4T steam locomotives.

=== Closure ===
==== Proposal ====
In Winter 1959/60, against a background of a continuing drop in passenger numbers, a study was undertaken to determine the actual numbers using the line and the savings to be made by closing it to passenger traffic. The results showed that 321 passengers per day were using the Allhallows line to travel to and from Gravesend, and that a saving of £25,500 per year would be made, were the line closed.

In March 1960 the proposed withdrawal of passenger services was announced, the main line from Gravesend to Grain remaining unaffected by the changes. The closure proposal was rejected by the South Eastern Area Transport Users Consultative Committee, whose consent was required in accordance with the Transport Act 1947, on the basis that replacement bus services would be inadequate. A new proposal was made by BR a few months later, which it backed up with new figures showing that passenger numbers had further declined since Winter 1959/60 and that savings would even higher - £43,324 per annum.

==== Opposition ====
Objections were made against the closure, notably from the Kent County Council and Strood Rural District Council which challenged BR's method of calculating passenger numbers and losses. They argued that the figures (i) failed to consider cheaper methods of running the line such as using diesel traction units, closing minor halts, eliminating unnecessary journeys, the operation of direct summer excursions from London to Allhallows and the combination of passenger and goods services, (ii) took into account costs incurred for the line between Gravesend and Grain which would remain open for freight, (iii) included a figure of £5,000 which would be paid to Maidstone & District Motor Services for replacement bus services, (iv) failed to take into account holiday traffic - 2,812 passengers having used Allhallows on the Whitsun holiday of 3/6 June 1960, and (v) failed to record the 25% increase in passenger numbers or take into account the ongoing residential development in the area.

It was also pointed out that the four replacement bus services - routes 17 (Gillingham - Cliffe, hourly), 19 and 65 (Gillingham - Grain, every 80 mins) and 47 (Gravesend to Cliffe, 10 per day) - were inadequate and would cause hardship to the local community as their timings would not allow passengers the same the ease or flexibility of use as that offered by rail transport. For example, the journey time of workers going to Uralite Halt from Gravesend by rail was 6 minutes, as opposed to 29 minutes by bus, while the journey from Gravesend to Allhallows was 34 minutes by rail and 1 hour 16 minutes by bus. The buses would also be oversubscribed at peak-times by schoolchildren.

==== December 1960 meeting ====
A meeting was held on 15 December 1960 between representatives of BR, the Kent County Council (KCC), Maidstone & District Motor Services, British Uralite and Strood Rural District Council. BR outlined its case for closure, giving three main reasons:

(i) electrification of the Hundred of Hoo line with the exception of the Allhallows branch would leave this latter part as an isolated pocket of diesel activity which would be difficult to service and maintain,
(ii) replacement bus services would provide a reasonable alternative to trains, and
(iii) the Allhallows branch did not merit investment with capital from the Modernisation Programme owing to the minimal numbers of passengers using the line and the siting of stations away from residential areas.

BR accepted that substituting the existing units with diesel rail buses would cut losses on the line, but argued that losses would not be completely eradicated and that rail buses would be unable to deal with Summer Sunday traffic.

KCC, announcing its intention to resist the proposed closure "strongly", reminded BR that planning permission for the construction of 1,200 houses on the Isle of Grain had been granted, possibly leading to an extra 4,000 potential users of the line. This was dismissed by BR which believed that many of these users would work locally and not need the railway. KCC also pointed out that bus users would have to find an extra 1s 10d per day to travel by bus from Allhallows to Gravesend by comparison with rail travel (a cheap day fare being 3s 6d), and the increased journey times would mean that schoolchildren would be away from home for 10¼ hours per day (by bus) as opposed to 8¾ hours (by train).

British Uralite predicted that the region would undergo "substantial" industrial development in the future which would generate extra traffic and that the railway, once taken away, would never be put back. BR replied that ownership of the land between Stoke Junction and Allhallows would be retained for a period of 10 years so that it could be returned to railway, were circumstances to warrant it.

==== TUCC approval ====
In September 1960 the South Eastern Area Transport Users Consultative Committee (TUCC) approved the closure proposal on the basis of new financial information provided to them by BR. Objectors had no access to the figures used by BR to arrive at its conclusions, and there were suspicions that the TUCC was not acting as impartially as it should have done and was simply trying to find ways around the objections raised in order to facilitate BR's plans for the line. With regard to the difference in journey times from Allhallows to Gravesend caused by the withdrawal of rail services, the TUCC concluded that "this inconvenience is outweighed by the savings the Commission will make."

Peter Kirk, the Conservative MP for Gravesend, criticised the TUCC's handling of the matter and tried to discuss it with Ernest Marples, the Minister of Transport. A Ministry of Transport memorandum of 14 April 1961 states that "it would not be proper for the Minister to see Mr Kirk at this stage [...] It may well be that Mr Kirk wished to put forward further representations at this late stage [...] Mr Kirk may, for example, wish to make some criticism of the way in which the proposals have been heard by the Consultative Committees." Access to the Minister was therefore refused.

A further memorandum dated 9 June 1961 admitted that "no doubt there will be a comeback from Mr Kirk MP who clearly has views on the merits of the proposal as well as the procedure adopted by the Consultative Committees" but stated that "the sooner the passenger service is closed, the greater the economy will be for the Railways who must already have lost a substantial amount during the last six months of argument."

==== Final decision ====
British Rail closure notice c1961

The announcement was made that passenger services on the line would cease as from Monday 4 December 1961, and that the last weekend of operation would be the 2/3 December.

A number of enthusiasts turned out for the final days of operation and the Railway Magazine described the activity on the 10.32am Saturday morning service (an "H" class 0-4-4T 31324): "[...] practically every seat was occupied throughout the journey to Allhallows. Photographers were much in evidence, and at least one had come equipped with a ciné camera and a portable tape recorder."

The last passenger train, hauled by C class 0-6-0 31689 formed of seven coaches, left Allhallows at 8.38pm on Sunday, 3 December. The last goods train had run the previous day.

The reasons for the commercial failure of Allhallows were neatly described by F. Oliver Randall in the November 1956 edition of the Railway Observer: "[...] the place falls sadly between two stools in that it lacks the most commonplace amenities associated with a seaside resort, yet has completely lost the rural charm and remoteness which it must have [...] possessed prior to its attempted exploitation."

==== Attempted revival ====
In 1974 a campaign was begun by Stoke Parish Council to re-open the line to passenger traffic. This proposal was opposed by BR on the grounds that as the line was single track only, a passenger service would interfere with the line's freight operations. There were also signalling complications.

== New freight opportunities ==
The failure of Allhallows to develop as a viable seaside resort and of Port Victoria as a commercial seaport was offset to some extent by the development of the Hoo Peninsula as a centre of industry.

=== The Admiralty ===
The Admiralty had been based near Chattenden since 1891 where there was a School of Military Engineering and barracks. A narrow gauge track was laid between 1873 and 1905 - the Chattenden and Upnor Railway - to transport men and munitions to and from the School. An armament depot was constructed in 1902 in order to supply the fleet and in 1905 the narrow gauge track was extended northwards to connect with the Hundred of Hoo line at Sharnal Street. By the end of the 1920s the line saw regular freight services to and from the depot, a service which continued until the narrow gauge track was lifted in December 1965.

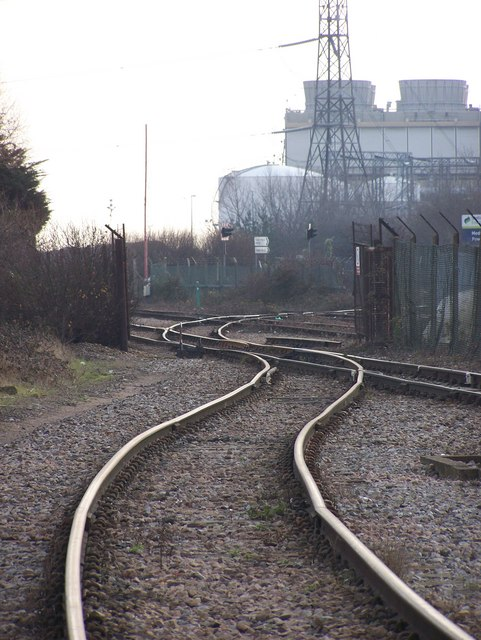
Sidings near Medway Power Station

=== Oil refineries ===
The Second World War exposed weaknesses in Britain's industrial capacity, amongst which was the ability to process crude oil. Post-war governments looked to remedy this vulnerability and the Thames estuary was identified as the new location for this new industry.

The first oil refinery on the Hoo Peninsula was opened at Kingsnorth by Berry Wiggins and Co in 1932. The refinery had its own standard gauge railway which connected with the line at Hoo Junction via a spur which was separated from the main line by a wooden gate.

The Medway Oil and Storage Company (later Power Petroleum) had opened a depot on Grain in 1928, this had been acquired by Shell-Mex & BP in 1934. During the Second World War the terminal had served as the base of operations for Operation Pluto, a scheme to construct undersea oil pipelines under the English Channel between England and France.

In 1948 work started on the construction of an oil refinery, then one of the largest in the country, on the Isle of Grain by the Anglo-Iranian Oil Company, which became part of BP in 1956. By 1961 the site boasted more than 3,000 workers and could refine 11 million tons of crude oil per year. A new station, Grain, was opened on 3 September 1951 to serve the refinery (a concrete platform being installed for workers) and the line east of this halt, including Grain Crossing Halt and Port Victoria station, was closed and dismantled in order to make space for the refinery's coastal operations.

The refineries generated significant goods traffic for the line.

=== APCM cement works ===
A cement industry had been established in the Cliffe area since 1860 when Francis and Co. opened the Nine Elms Cement Works on Cliffe Marsh, to the west of the village where the chalk cliffs came almost to within a mile of the River Thames. The site was taken over by the British Portland Cement Company in 1900 and works continued until 1920. In 1910 the Alpha Cement Works was constructed by the Thames Portland Cement Company. The site was exhausted by 1950 and was flooded as quarrying activities exceeded the depth of the water table. A second quarry was begun to the north of Salt Lane on the edge of the marshes.

By the late 1950s the cement industry in the area was under the control of the APCM (Associated Portland Cement Manufacturers Ltd). A new siding was laid to serve the works (the APCM having switched the transport of their cement freight (around 1,000 tons per week) and delivery of coal from river and road to rail) which remained in use until 1969 when the chalk pits were again exhausted and flooded. In 1970 Marinex Gravel took over the site and used it as a base to receive gravel which had been dredged from the River Thames sea bed.

=== Cellactite and British Uralite Ltd ===
British Uralite was formed in 1899 and opened a factory at Higham the following year which manufactured drainage pipes from wet asbestos paste. The factory was served by its own station, Uralite Halt, which opened in 1906 and, although open to the public, was primarily intended for Uralite's workforce. The works have now closed and the site is part of the Canal Road Industrial Estate.

=== Foster Yeoman terminal ===
Foster Yeoman, a quarrying and asphalt company, opened an aggregates terminal using one of the refinery jetties at Grain in 1988 from which it could transport overseas the stone quarried at Glensanda near Oban. The firm had first been involved in the area during the construction of the Channel Tunnel for which it supplied stone. The terminal was part of the concrete works site of TransManche Link, the Anglo-French engineering consortium which took over the land formerly occupied by the BP refinery. The tunnel lining segments for the English side of the tunnel were manufactured here. The Grain terminal receives annually 2 million tonnes of stone by sea from Glensanda. The completion of the Channel Tunnel in 1994 led to the dissolution of TransManche Link, and the aggregates terminal continued to distribute material by rail, road or barge for use in south eastern construction projects, including the high speed one rail link, and as a major supplier of ballast for rail maintenance.

=== Thamesport ===
In 1990 Maritime Transport Services Ltd constructed a container port on the southern coastline of the Isle of Grain, taking over the area previously occupied by BP. In 1998 Thamesport was sold to Hutchison Ports (UK) which then sold it again in 2001 to Maritime Transport.

== The route of the line ==
=== Gravesend to Port Victoria ===
Departing Gravesend Central, the line passes beneath a bridge carrying the A226 before reaching Milton Road Halt (1/2 mile or 0.8 km). Here there is a road overbridge for Mark Lane (which was once a level crossing). The line then passes Denton Halt (1 1/4 miles or 2.0 km), following the course of the Thames and Medway Canal before arriving at Milton Range Halt. This was originally intended to serve the nearby rifle range, but was more often used by railway workmen who used this desolate spot to leave their tools. Continuing onwards to Hoo Junction, the line forks: the North Kent Main Line continuing south-east to Higham and the Hundred of Hoo railway swinging leftwards onto a single track, arriving soon after at Uralite Halt (3 1/2 miles or 5.6 km).

The line now rises at a 1:120 (0.833%) gradient, passing over the Thames and Medway Canal and crossing Higham Marsh. Climbing on a 1:60 (1.67%) gradient, the line passes under two road bridges before reaching Cliffe (5 3/4 miles or 9.3 km) which was located over one mile (1.6 km) from the actual village. Departing Cliffe, the line rises again on a 1:190 (0.53%) gradient onto the embankment at Cooling Street, becoming a 1:66 (1.52%) gradient and then descending on a 1:160 (0.625%) gradient to Wyborne's farm siding and High Halstow Halt (8 1/4 miles or 13.3 km). The next stop was Sharnal Street (9 1/4 miles or 14.9 km), located two miles (3.2 km) from the nearest town, Hoo. Passing under a road bridge just outside the station, there was a connection with the Chattenden and Upnor Railway, a 2 ft 6 in (762 mm) narrow gauge line.

Descending on a 1:165 (0.61%) gradient, the line reaches Beluncle Halt (10 1/4 miles or 16.5 km) before passing under another bridge and continuing on a level towards Middle Stoke Halt (10 1/2 miles or 16.9 km), located one-half mile (0.8 km) from Stoke Wharf. Nearly one mile (1.6 km) further on was Stoke Crossing (later to become Stoke Junction Halt) and its level crossing (13 miles or 21 km). Heading gently southwards towards the River Medway and Port Victoria, the line crosses over Grain Bridge to reach the Isle of Grain. Here we have Grain Crossing Halt (14 1/2 miles or 23.3 km) together with its level crossing, later replaced by Grain (14 3/4 miles or 23.7 km). Finally, the train would pull into its terminus - Port Victoria (16 miles or 26 km) where passengers would descend onto the wooden pier, walking down to the lower platform to board their ferry if the tide was out, or continuing to the end of the upper platform when the tide was in. The train would then be prepared for its return journey on the turntable just outside the pier.

=== Allhallows branch ===
The branch line to Allhallows (14 3/4 miles or 23.7 km) diverged from the main line to Port Victoria between Middle Stoke and Grain Crossing Halts and headed north for 1 1/2 miles (2.4 km) on an embankment averaging 3 ft (0.91 m) in height. The final one-quarter mile (0.4 km) was carried in a shallow cutting with a maximum depth of 7 ft (2.13 m). The line terminated one-quarter mile (0.4 km) from the seashore, almost directly opposite Westcliff-on-Sea in Essex. The line encountered no major construction problems: for the greater part of its length it passed through low-lying pasture fields and ditches which necessitated the construction of ten culverts. The return journey from Allhallows generally saw the train continue as far as Stoke Junction where it would reverse to Grain before retracing its steps and continuing to Gravesend Central.

== The line today ==
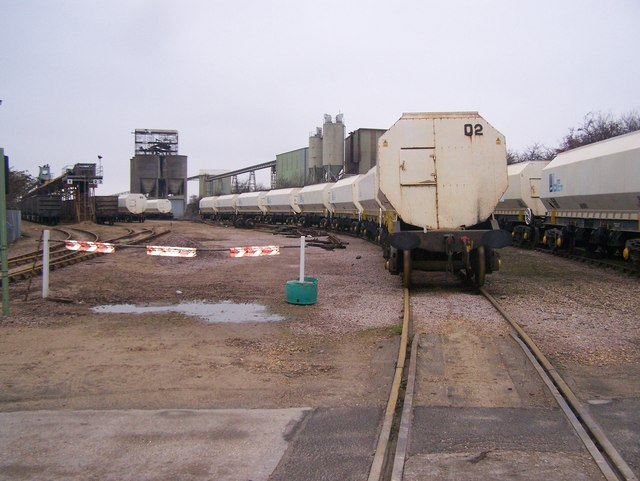
Brett Gravel works containers

Although the Berry Wiggins refinery and APCM cement works closed in 1972 and the BP refinery in 1997, Grain remains an active railway terminal as the forwarding point for granite shipped from Scotland.

The line is freight-only and services run from Monday to Friday, with occasional weekend enthusiasts excursions or Serco test trains. Approximately one train per hour runs on weekdays throughout the line. Currently the line sees use from:

(i) DB Cargo UK and GB Railfreight ballast from Foster Yeoman's aggregate terminal at Grain where an 08 shunter can usually be found,
(ii) Freightliner services to and from Thamesport

Class 66s are predominantly to be seen on the line, with occasional sightings of 59s and 60s.

One of the proposals for a Thames Estuary Airport is in the Isle of Grain area and the railway, given its gentle curvatures, could possibly be upgraded to support high-speed railway traffic, though this would probably involve electrification and double-tracking.

In January 2019, Campaign for Better Transport identified the line was listed as Priority 2 for reopening, as it may support housing development sites in the Medway Council Local Plan. Priority 2 is for those lines which require further development or a change in circumstances (such as housing developments).

== Bibliography ==
- Hart, Brian (1989). The Hundred of Hoo Railway. Wild Swan Publications Ltd. ISBN 0-906867-73-8.
- Yates, Nigel (2001). Kent in the Twentieth Century. Boydell Press. pp. 47–48. ISBN 0-85115-587-1.
- Titch, Little (August 2003). "A Short-lived Branch Line: The Allhallows-on-Sea branch". Railway Bylines. 8 (9): 418–425. ISSN 1360-2098.
- Butter, Roland (July 2007). "Allhallows-on-Sea: Anatomy of a closure (Part One)". Railway Bylines. 12 (8): 352–363. ISSN 1360-2098.
- Butter, Roland (August 2007). "Allhallows-on-Sea: Anatomy of a closure (Part Two)". Railway Bylines. 12 (9): 422–435. ISSN 1360-2098.
- Harding, Peter A. (1993). Branch lines in Kent. Bagshot: Peter A. Harding. ISBN 0-9523458-1-1.
- Kidner, R. W. (1985). Southern Railway Halts. Survey and Gazetteer. Headington, Oxford: The Oakwood Press. ISBN 0-85361-321-4.
