= Gravesend railway station =

Railway station in Kent, England

Coordinates: 51°26′28.74″N 0°22′0.09″E

Gravesend
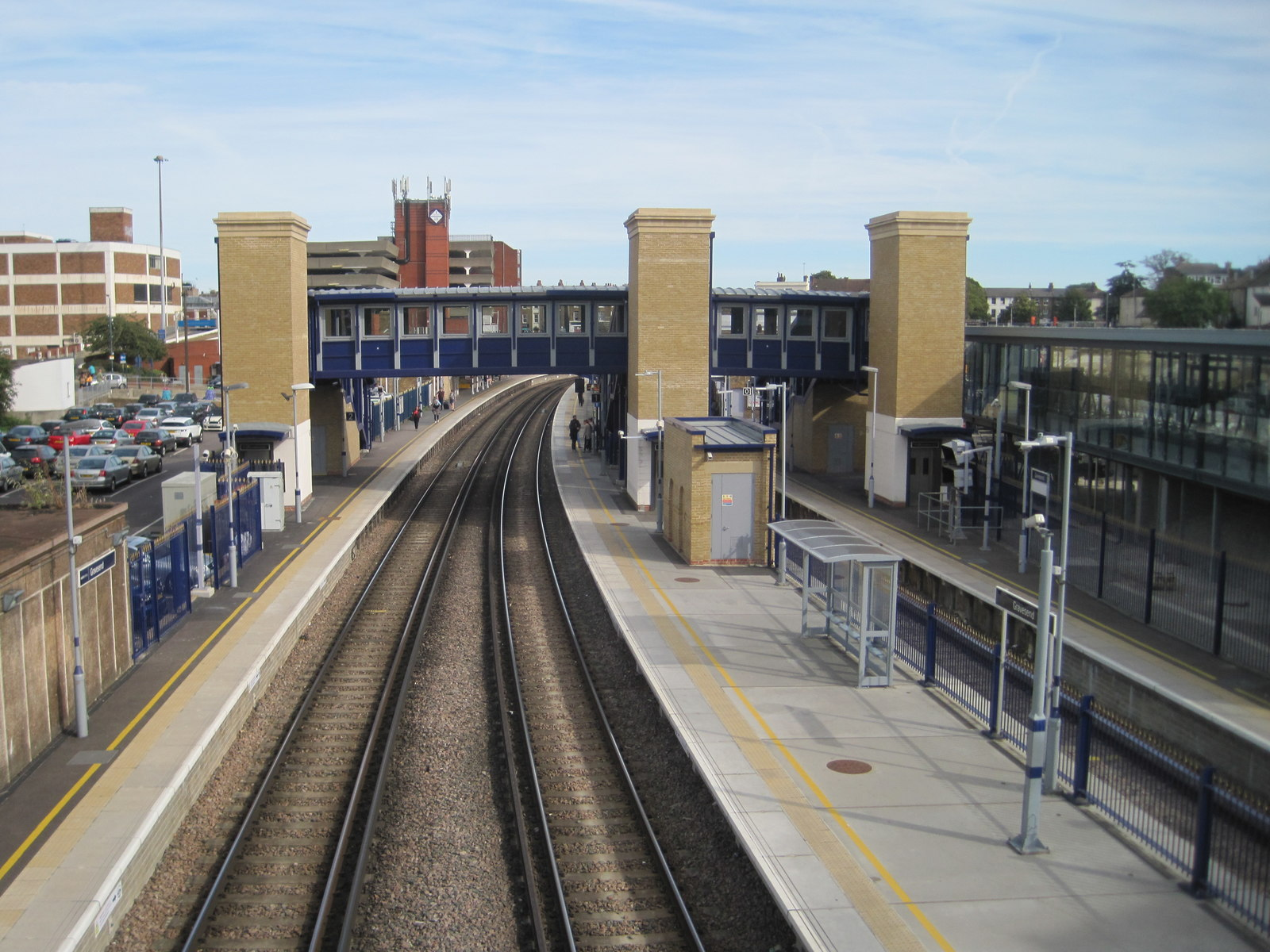
- Overview of footbridge and platforms

General information
- Location: Gravesend, Borough of Gravesham; England
- Grid reference: TQ645740
- Manager: Southeastern
- Platforms: 3

Other information
- Station code: GRV
- Classification: DfT category C2

History
- Opened: 30 July 1849; 177 years ago

Passengers
- 2020/21: ▼0.882 million
- Interchange: ▼47,714
- 2021/22: ▲1.892 million
- Interchange: ▲0.106 million
- 2022/23: ▲2.256 million
- Interchange: ▲0.444 million
- 2023/24: ▲2.571 million
- Interchange: ▼0.258 million
- 2024/25: ▲2.886 million
- Interchange: ▲0.277 million
Location
Notes
- Passenger statistics from the Office of Rail and Road

Gravesend railway station serves the town of Gravesend in north Kent, England. It is 23 miles 75 chains (38.5 km) down the line from London Charing Cross.

Train services are operated by Southeastern and Thameslink. During Christmas 2013, a major overhaul of the lines and platforms changed the four track, two platform layout into two through lines and a western facing bay platform.

== History ==
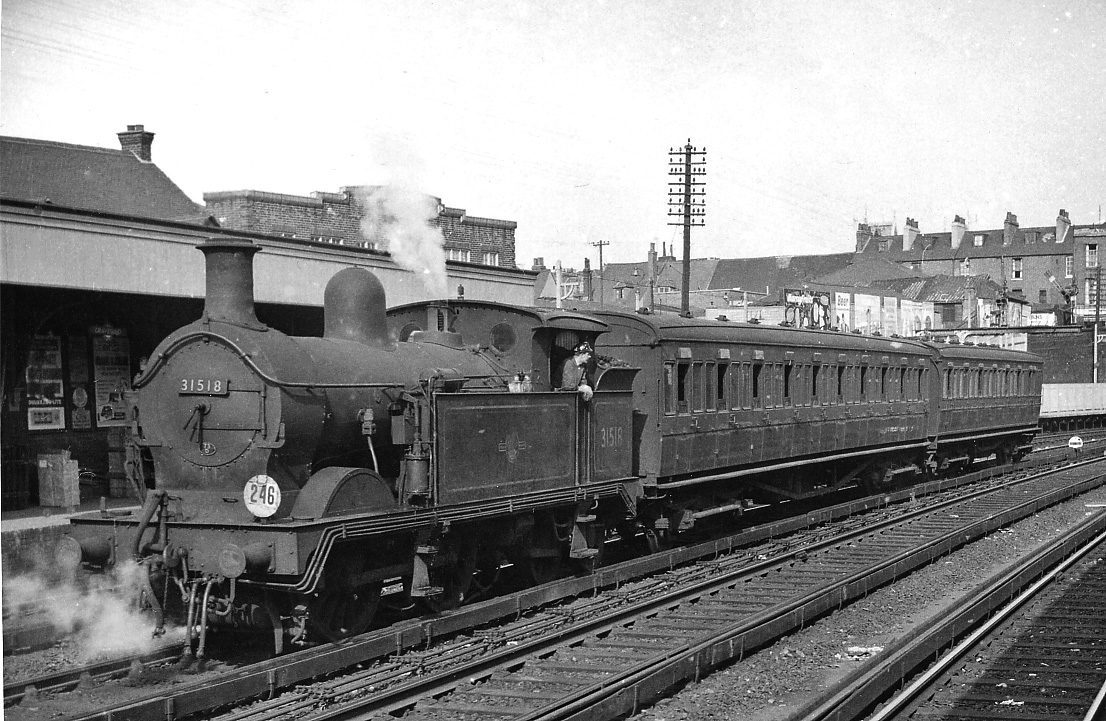
Auto-train at Gravesend Railway Station in 1959

The first railway line to arrive in Gravesend was the Gravesend & Rochester Railway (G&RR) who had purchased the Thames and Medway Canal and its tunnel between Strood and Higham. The G&RR ran the first train to the then terminus at Gravesend (adjacent to the Canal Basin) on 10 February 1845. On 30 July 1849, the line was extended to North Kent East Junction on the South Eastern Railway (SER) and thence to London Bridge.

There was a second Gravesend station (later known as Gravesend West Street then later still Gravesend West) opened by SER's rivals, London, Chatham & Dover Railway (LCDR). It was the end of a branch off the LCDR's main line and it allowed access to Victoria. Journey times were uncompetitive and, when the two companies combined in 1899, the branch was soon relegated to a secondary line and closed in 1968. To differentiate from this other station, Gravesend was named Gravesend Central for a long time.

High speed HS1 services to London St Pancras International were introduced in December 2009 and proved highly successful, having cut London-bound journey times to 23 minutes. The station is now seen as a major interchange for metro and high-speed services. There is far greater customer patronage for high-speed services to St Pancras from Gravesend in comparison to nearby Ebbsfleet International, where usage is considered modest at best. This might be due (in part) to the sizeable London-bound commuter population in and around Gravesham, as opposed to domestic passenger use at Ebbsfleet, from elsewhere in North West Kent. Additionally, services between Maidstone West and London St Pancras have since been added to SouthEastern's High Speed route, which stop at Strood and Gravesend prior to joining the high speed lines at Ebbsfleet.

In 2013, a £19 million overhaul of the station, platforms and lines involved the demolition of a former water tank base on the southern platform of the station (Platform 1 at this time), the installation of a new lift/stair bridge complex towards the western end of the station, the removal of the early 20th century footbridge that spanned the lines close to the ticket halls and a major remodelling of the lines and platforms.

The station's track layout was substantially altered in December 2013. This was primarily for extending the current platforms to accommodate 12 coach trains as opposed to the previous 10 coach limit. Platform 1 has been extended and converted to a London-facing bay platform and renumbered as Platform 0. A new single face central Platform 1 is located on the site of what was the former up 'through' road. Services from Medway and Faversham, including London-bound high-speed trains, use this platform. This new platform has bidirectional workings and capability. Platform 2 remained numbered as '2'; however, it lost its turnback capability and thus caters solely for coast bound services. Services terminating at Gravesend from London Charing Cross or London Cannon Street stations terminate on Platform 0.

The previous historic but narrow central footbridge has been replaced with a large sheltered bridge with lifts, at the London end of the station and serving all three platforms. This new bridge is at the far western end of the platforms; the previous bridge was conveniently near the centre of the platforms and near to the entry/exit.

== Services ==
Services at Gravesend are operated by Southeastern and Thameslink using Class 376, 395, 465, 466, 700 and 707 EMUs.

The typical off-peak service in trains per hour is:

- 2 tph to London St Pancras International
- 2 tph to London Charing Cross via Sidcup
- 2 tph to London Victoria via Bexleyheath
- 2 tph to Luton via Woolwich Arsenal and Greenwich
- 2 tph to Rainham
- 1 tph to Faversham
- 1 tph to Ramsgate

Additional services, including trains to and from London Cannon Street, and two daily return services between London St Pancras International and Maidstone West call at the station during the peak hours.

Preceding station	National Rail	Following station
Ebbsfleet International	Southeastern High Speed 1	Strood
Northfleet	Southeastern North Kent Line	Terminus
Northfleet	Southeastern North Kent Line	Higham Peak Hours Only
Northfleet	Thameslink North Kent Line	Higham
	Disused railways	
Terminus	British Rail Southern Region Hoo Peninsula branch	Uralite Halt
Northfleet	British Rail Southern Region North Kent Line	Denton Halt
Northfleet	British Rail Southern Region North Kent Line	Milton Range Halt
Northfleet	British Rail Southern Region North Kent Line	Hoo Junction Staff Halt
