= Milton Range Halt railway station =

Disused railway station in Kent, England

Milton Range Halt

General information
- Location: Chalk, Borough of Gravesham; England
- Coordinates: 51.4381°N 0.4210°E
- Grid reference: TQ682738
- Platforms: 2

Other information
- Status: Disused

History
- Pre-grouping: South Eastern and Chatham Railway
- Post-grouping: Southern Railway

Key dates
- July 1906: Opened
- 17 September 1932: Closed to regular passenger traffic
- c. 1956: Closed to special traffic
Location

Milton Range Halt was a halt between Denton Halt and Hoo Junction Staff Halt on the Hundred of Hoo Railway. It opened in July 1906 and closed to public use on 17 September 1932, although it remained open by special arrangement after that date until some time after 1956. It served Milton Range rifle range.

The station was constructed on a low embankment to the south of the Thames and Medway Canal beyond Higham, where the line climbs at 1 in 215 and then falls in a short cutting at 1 in 267. Initially, an island platform was provided, but this was removed in 1914 to be replaced by 400 ft (120 m) wooden facing platforms. These were later rebuilt in concrete and survived beyond official closure to passenger traffic in 1932. At the eastern end of the platforms was a gated sleeper crossing which carried a public footpath over the line.

Ostensibly provided to serve the adjoining rifle range, Milton Range Halt was more frequently used by platelayers and railway workmen who would unload tools and materials at this desolate spot. For many years there was a long engineer's siding behind the down platform. The station took on greater importance early in the First World War when around 200 soldiers travelled on weekdays to Milton Range Halt from Chatham on the 0750 service from Cannon Street, returning on the 1325 Charing Cross to Maidstone West, which had three extra third class carriages attached for the use of the soldiers. By May 1915, special calls at the halt were being made by six down and five up services when requested; the Gravesend stationmaster was informed when special calls were to be made by down trains, whilst the Strood stationmaster was responsible for up trains. These stations had to telephone Milton Range Halt every time that a train was to call, with three minutes being allowed for the stop. This arrangement remained in force for the duration of the war.

The station was the site of an accident in August 1922 when a down passenger train held at the halt was struck from behind by another train, resulting in the death of five passengers. After the arrival of the 0540 workmen's train from Charing Cross to Strood at 0630, a number of workmen employed in the construction of the A2 road to the south alighted and crossed the line in front of the engine. They proceeded along the up line when they were struck in dense river fog by an up train, killing one workman and seriously injuring another. The accident caused the first train to be delayed at the halt where it was run into by the next workmen's special, timed to leave New Cross at 0555 and to arrive at Milton Range Halt ten minutes after the first train. The collision resulted in the death of a third workman and fatal injuries to two others. The driver of the second train was found to be primarily responsible for the accident by passing a signal without observing its position.

The last remains of the derelict platforms survived until 2009.

Preceding station	Historical railways	Following station
Denton Halt	July 1906 to 31 December 1922; SECR; Hundred of Hoo Railway	Uralite Halt
Denton Halt	1 January 1923 to 16 September 1932; SR; Hundred of Hoo Railway	Uralite Halt

== Sources ==
- Butt, R.V.J. (1995). The Directory of Railway Stations. Sparkford, Somerset: Patrick Stephens Ltd. ISBN 978-1-85260-508-7.
- Course, Edwin Alfred (1974). The Railways of Southern England: Secondary and Branch Lines. London: B.T. Batsford Ltd. ISBN 0-7134-2835-X.
- Croughton, Godfrey; Kidner, R.W.; Young, Alan (1982). Private and Untimetabled Railway Stations. Salisbury: Oakwood Press. ISBN 0-85361-281-1.
- Gould, David (January 1981). The South Eastern & Chatham Railway in the 1914-18 War (No. 134). Tarrant Hinton: Oakwood Press. ISBN 0-85361-278-1.
- Hart, Brian (1989). The Hundred of Hoo Railway. Didcot: Wild Swan Publications. ISBN 0-906867-73-8.
- Kidner, R. W. (1985). Southern Railway Halts: Survey and Gazetteer. Headington, Oxford: The Oakwood Press. ISBN 0-85361-321-4.
- Mitchell, Vic; Smith, Keith (January 1989) [1988]. Branch Line to Allhallows including Port Victoria and Grain. Midhurst, West Sussex: Middleton Press. ISBN 0-906520-62-2.
