= Northfleet railway station =

Railway station in Kent, England

Coordinates: 51°26′45.43″N 0°19′26.24″E

Northfleet
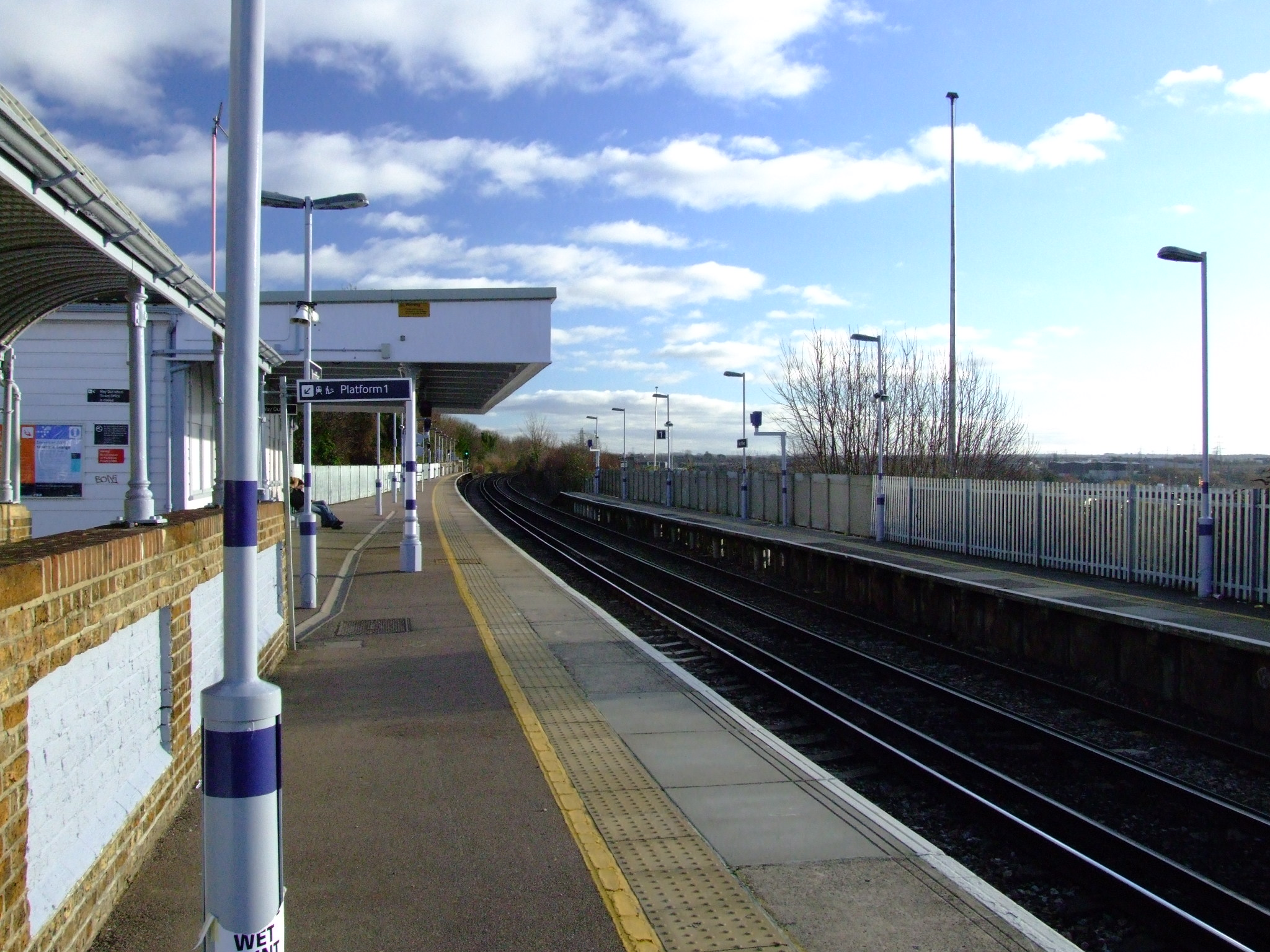

General information
- Location: Northfleet, Borough of Gravesham; England
- Grid reference: TQ615744
- Manager: Southeastern
- Platforms: 2

Other information
- Station code: NFL
- Classification: DfT category E

History
- Opened: 30 July 1849

Passengers
- 2020/21: ▼74,048
- 2021/22: ▲0.127 million
- 2022/23: ▲0.157 million
- 2023/24: ▲0.212 million
- 2024/25: ▲0.258 million
Location
Notes
- Passenger statistics from the Office of Rail and Road

Northfleet railway station serves the town of Northfleet in the Borough of Gravesham in Kent, England. It is 21 miles 69 chains (35.2 km) down the line from London Charing Cross. Train services are operated by Southeastern and Thameslink.

The ticket office located on platform 2, on the 'down' side, is situated in the substantial station building. This is staffed between 06:00 - 10:00 Monday to Friday; at other times a ticket machine can be found outside the entrance, accepting card and contactless payments only.

There is no step-free access to platform 1 on the 'up' side. A foot tunnel connects the two platforms.

The station is very close to Ebbsfleet International station (the NNE entrance is only 334 yards (305 m) from Northfleet's station), but passengers (using public transport) will find it far easier to access Ebbsfleet International from Gravesend or Greenhithe, as these stations are more accessible and offer easy access to Fastrack bus services. The walking route between the two stations is 0.6 miles (1 km) or 0.8 miles (1.3 km) and a suitable pedestrian link has not been built because of funding issues and objections from Land Securities.

== Services ==
Services at Northfleet are operated by Southeastern and Thameslink using Class 376, 465, 466, 700 and 707 EMUs.

The typical off-peak service in trains per hour is:

- 2 tph to London Charing Cross via Sidcup
- 2 tph to Luton via Woolwich Arsenal and Greenwich
- 2 tph to Gravesend
- 2 tph to Rainham via Chatham

Additional services, including trains to and from London Cannon Street via Woolwich Arsenal and Lewisham call at the station during the peak hours.

Preceding station	National Rail	Following station
Swanscombe	Southeastern North Kent Line	Gravesend
Swanscombe	Thameslink North Kent Line	Gravesend
