= Hoo Junction =

Railway yard in the UK

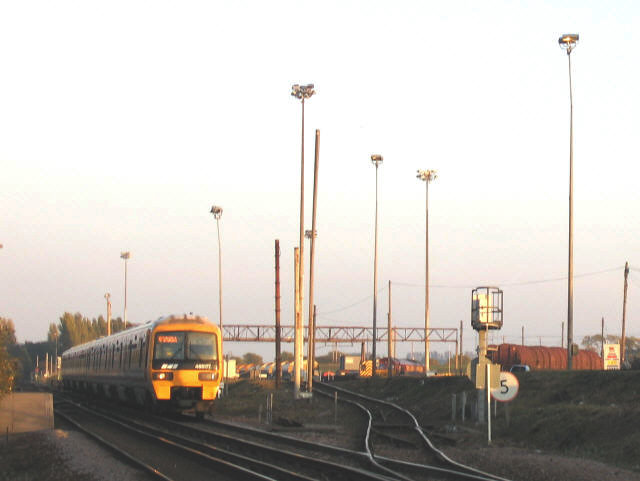
Up yard of Hoo Junction with a Networker train on the main line

Hoo Junction is a rail yard on the North Kent Line, near the village of Higham, Kent and Shorne Marshes, operated by DB Cargo UK; formerly the English, Welsh and Scottish Railway. It is between Gravesend and Higham stations, at the junction with the freight-only single-track Hoo branch to the Hoo Peninsula.

== Layout ==
There are up and down yards on either side of the main line, with the single-track Grain branch line entering from the north east.

The up yard (south of the main line) consists of 14 sidings and three through roads, with other ancillary sidings. The down yard (north of the main line) consists of 10 sidings and three through roads. Some sidings in the down yard have been taken up.

As part of Phase 1 of the Kent Coast Electrification Scheme, the yard at Hoo Junction had a simple overhead catenary system installed in 1959, to accommodate the Class 71 electric locomotives then brought into use. These were equipped with a pantograph to work off the catenary, intended to avoid the exposed third rail which could have added a danger for yard staff. Due to introduction of diesel-electric locomotives the catenary system had become redundant by 1975.

Westinghouse Rail Systems has buildings adjacent to the north perimeter of the yard.

== Traffic ==
The yard re-marshals wagon traffic on the main line and from the branch. The majority of traffic is aggregate wagons, with steel strip carriers are also present. Infrastructure units and ballast trains also use the yard. Container traffic from Thamesport used to pass through but this flow ceased around 2014 when the larger container shipping lines started using Thames Gateway instead of Thamesport.

== Staff halt ==
Hoo Junction Staff Halt opened in 1956 in the yard, which it was built to serve. The down platform was on the main line before the junction with the branch, at TQ 6950 7369 51°26′11″N 0°26′20″E, while the up platform was only on the main line, at TQ 6980 7364 51°26′09″N 0°26′36″E. This station had an hourly service, which was advertised as being "for staff purposes only". The station has been closed and demolished.

=== Down platform ===
Preceding station	Disused railways	Following station
Denton Halt	1956 to 3-12-1961; BR(S); Hundred of Hoo Railway	Uralite Halt
Gravesend Central	From; 4-12-1961; BR(S) later Network Rail; Hundred of Hoo Railway	Goods line to Grain
Denton Halt	1956 to 3-12-1961; BR(S); North Kent Line	Higham

Preceding station	National Rail	Following station
Gravesend	From 4-12-1961 BR(S) later Network Rail; North Kent Line	Higham

=== Up platform ===
Preceding station	Disused railways	Following station
Higham	1956 to 3-12-1961; BR(S); North Kent Line	Denton Halt

Preceding station	National Rail	Following station
Higham	From 4-12-1961; BR(S) later Network Rail; North Kent Line	Gravesend

== See also ==
- Rail transport in Great Britain
