= Milton Road Halt railway station =

Former railway station in England

Milton Road Halt

General information
- Location: Gravesend, Borough of Gravesham; England
- Grid reference: TQ656738
- Platforms: 2

Other information
- Status: Disused

History
- Pre-grouping: South Eastern & Chatham Railway

Key dates
- July 1906: Opened
- 1 May 1915: Closed
Location

Milton Road Halt (TQ 656 738 51°26′20″N 0°23′01″E) was a halt between Gravesend Central and Denton Halt on the Hundred of Hoo Railway in Kent, England. It opened in July 1906 and closed on 1 May 1915. The halt was about 0.5 miles (0.80 km) from Gravesend Central.

Preceding station	Disused railways	Following station
Gravesend Central	July 1906 to April 1915; SECR; Hundred of Hoo Railway	Denton Halt

== Sources. ==
- Kidner, R. W. (1985). Southern Railway Halts. Survey and Gazetteer. Headington, Oxford: The Oakwood Press. ISBN 0-85361-321-4.
