= Higham railway station (Kent) =

Railway station in Kent, England

Coordinates: 51°25′36.12″N 0°27′58.71″E

Higham
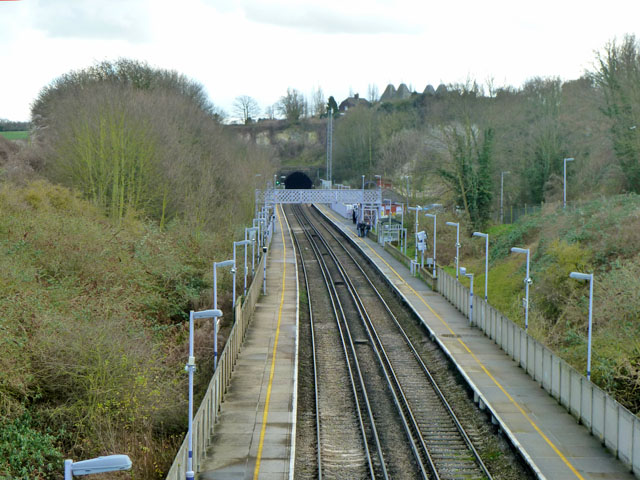

General information
- Location: Higham, Borough of Gravesham; England
- Grid reference: TQ715726
- Manager: Southeastern
- Platforms: 2

Other information
- Station code: HGM
- Classification: DfT category E

History
- Original company: Gravesend and Rochester Railway; South Eastern Railway
- Pre-grouping: South Eastern and Chatham Railway
- Post-grouping: Southern Railway

Key dates
- 8 Feb 1845: Opened
- 13 December 1846: Closed (G & R)
- 23 Aug 1847: Reopened (SE)

Passengers
- 2020/21: ▼48,460
- Interchange: ▼1
- 2021/22: ▲95,064
- Interchange: ▲3
- 2022/23: ▲0.108 million
- 2023/24: ▲0.115 million
- 2024/25: ▲0.138 million
Location
Notes
- Passenger statistics from the Office of Rail and Road

Higham railway station is in the hamlet of Lower Higham in north Kent. The village of Higham is about 1 mile (1.6 km) to the south.

It is 28 miles 42 chains (45.9 km) down the line from London Charing Cross. Train services have been operated by Thameslink since May 2018. Before that time, the services were operated by Southeastern and its predecessors, although the station is still managed by Southeastern.

The ticket office, on the 'up' side, is situated in the substantial station building. This is staffed only during part of the day; at other times a TVM passenger-operated ticket machine issues tickets - and is located at the entrance to the up platform, at the foot of the staircase.

From Higham to Strood, the railway passes through a tunnel built for the Thames and Medway Canal, and the station building was converted from the home of the canal towing contractor. The waiting room was heated by the original open fire until as recently as the 1980s.

== History ==
One of the more unusual pieces of freight handled by the station was a Swiss chalet, in 94 separate pieces, packed into 58 boxes. It arrived over Christmas 1864 as a gift for Charles Dickens at nearby Gad's Hill.

According to the Official Handbook of Stations the following classes of traffic were being handled at this station in 1956: G, P, L, H, C and there was a 1-ton 2 cwt crane.

== Services ==
Off-peak, all services at Higham are operated by Thameslink using Class 700 EMUs.

The typical off-peak service in trains per hour is:

- 2 tph to Luton via Dartford and Greenwich
- 2 tph to Rainham

Additional services, including a small number of Southeastern operated trains to and from London Charing Cross via Sidcup call at the station during the peak hours.

Preceding station	National Rail	Following station
Gravesend	Thameslink North Kent Line	Strood
Gravesend	Southeastern North Kent Line Peak Hours Only	Strood
	Historical railways	
Denton Halt Line open, station closed	British Rail Southern Region North Kent Line	Strood Line and station open
Milton Range Halt Line open, station closed	British Rail Southern Region North Kent Line	Strood Line and station open
	Disused railways	
Gravesend Line and station open	South Eastern Railway North Kent Line	Strood (1st) Line and station closed
