= Milton Range =

Shooting range in Kent, England

Coordinates: 51.4414°N 0.412°E

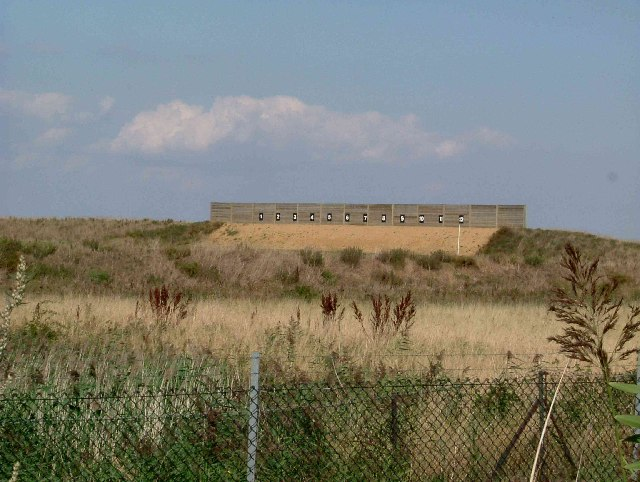
The butts at Milton Range

Milton Range is a rifle range east of Gravesend. It was formerly served by Milton Range Halt.

== Police Training Centre ==
There is an establishment for the training of specialist police officers. It includes a mock high street with replicas of shops such as a Post Office, a Barclays bank & a Your Move estate agents. There are also 2 trains, a London Underground 1959 Stock carriage and a British Rail Class 303 driving trailer coach.
