= Strood (1st) railway station =

Coordinates: 51°23′47″N 0°30′08″E

Strood

General information
- Location: Strood, Borough of Medway; England

Other information
- Status: Disused

History
- Original company: Gravesend and Rochester Railway; South Eastern Railway

Key dates
- 8 February 1845: Opened as Rochester
- 13 December 1846: Closed
- 23 August 1847: Reopened
- July 1849: Renamed Strood, Rochester and Chatham
- June 1852: Renamed Strood
- 18 Jun 1856: Closed
Location

Strood (1st) (locally known as and marked on old maps as The Old Terminus) was a terminus of the South Eastern Railway located in Strood and serving also the towns of Chatham and Rochester. It closed for passengers in 1856 when the present Strood station was opened. The site was then used as a sidings yard until around 1990. It is now occupied by housing development and industrial units.

Former Services

| Preceding station | Disused railways | Following station |
|---|---|---|
| Higham | South Eastern Railway | Terminus |

== Maps ==
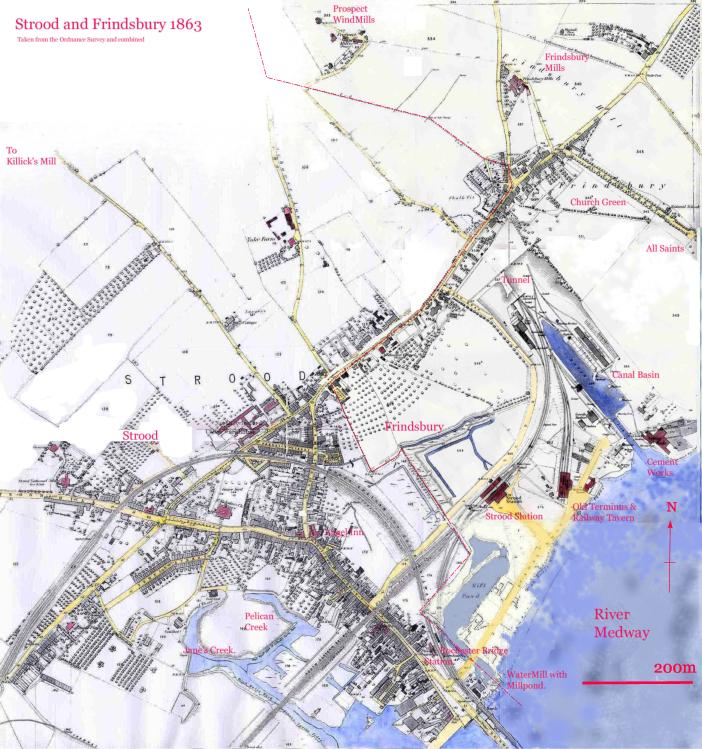
1863 Map of Strood and Frindsbury showing Strood's first station (Old Terminus) and second station (Strood Station).

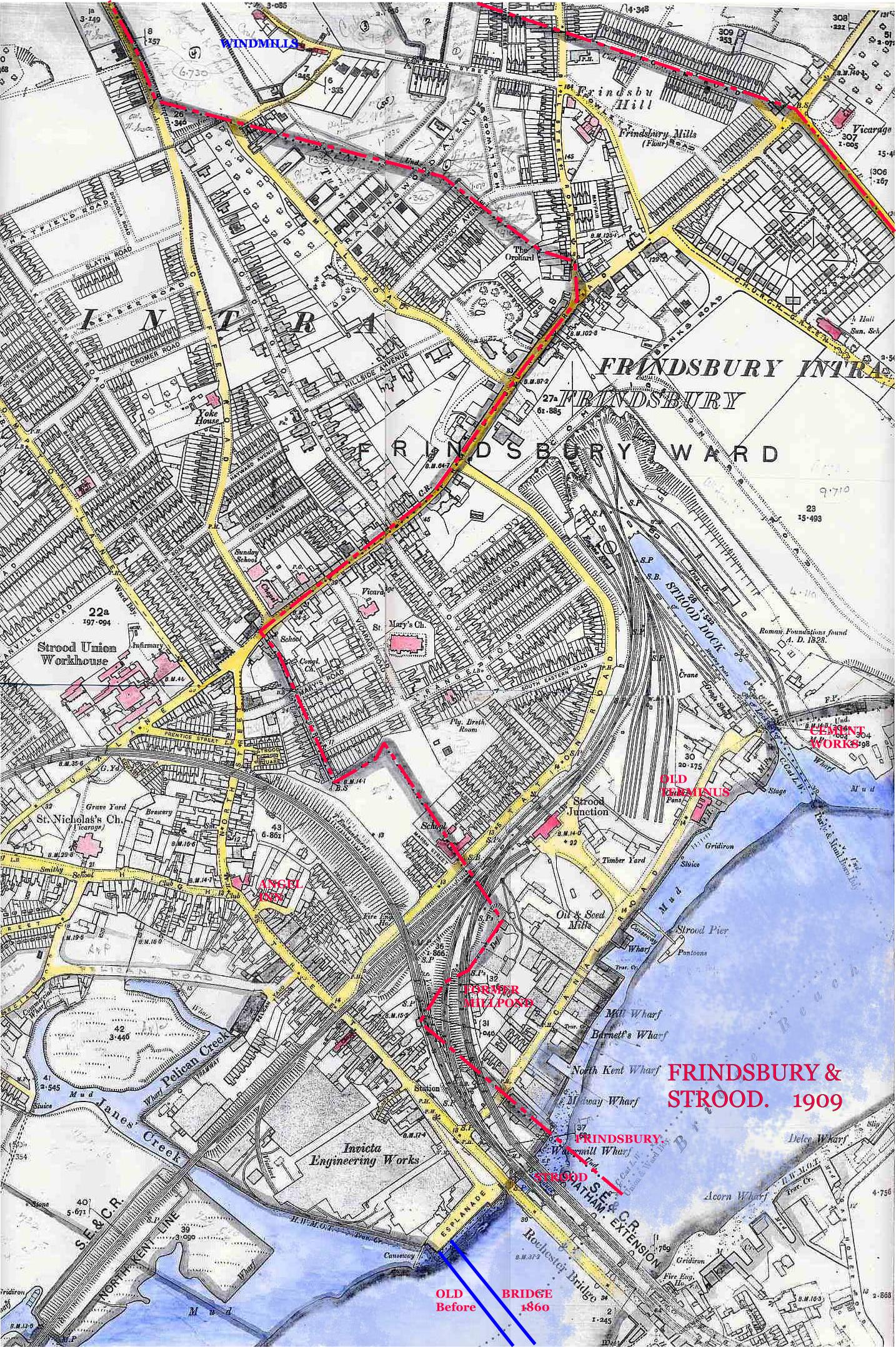
1909 Map of Strood and Frindsbury showing that the site of the Old Terminus had become a sidings yard.
