= Uralite Halt railway station =

Disused railway station in Kent, England

Uralite Halt

General information
- Location: Higham, Gravesham; England
- Grid reference: TQ702737
- Platforms: 1

Other information
- Status: Disused

History
- Pre-grouping: South Eastern & Chatham Railway
- Post-grouping: Southern Railway; Southern Region of British Railways

Key dates
- July 1906: Opened
- 4 December 1961: Closed
Location

Uralite Halt (TQ 702 737 51°26′12″N 0°26′59″E) was a halt between Milton Range Halt and Cliffe station on the Hundred of Hoo Railway. Built to serve the British Uralite works, it opened in July 1906 and closed on 4 December 1961. The halt was demolished soon after closure.

Preceding station	Disused railways	Following station
Milton Range Halt	7/1906 to 31-12-1922; SECR; Hundred of Hoo Railway	Cliffe station
Milton Range Halt	1-1-1923 to 16-9-1932; SR; Hundred of Hoo Railway	Cliffe station
Denton Halt	17-9-1932 to 31-12-1947; SR; Hundred of Hoo Railway	Cliffe station
Denton Halt	1-1-1948 to 1956; BR(S); Hundred of Hoo Railway	Cliffe station
Hoo Junction Staff Halt	1956 to 3-12-1961; BR(S); Hundred of Hoo Railway	Cliffe station

== Sources ==
- Kidner, R. W. (1985). Southern Railway Halts. Survey and Gazetteer. Headington, Oxford: The Oakwood Press. ISBN 0-85361-321-4.
