= Denton Halt railway station =

Disused railway station in Kent, England

Denton Halt

General information
- Location: Gravesend, Borough of Gravesham; England
- Coordinates: 51.44121°N 0.39333°E
- Grid reference: TQ667741
- Platforms: 2

Other information
- Status: Disused

History
- Pre-grouping: South Eastern & Chatham Railway
- Post-grouping: Southern Railway; Southern Region of British Railways

Key dates
- July 1906: Opened
- 1914: Name changed to Denton Road
- 1919: Name reverted to Denton Halt
- 4 December 1961: Closed
Location

Denton Halt was a halt between Milton Road Halt and Milton Range Halt on the Hundred of Hoo Railway. It opened in July 1906 and closed on 4 December 1961. The halt was about 1.25 miles (2.01 km) from Gravesend Central. The station was demolished after closure and there are no remains today. The level crossing adjacent to the station was closed in 1971 and replaced with a footbridge.

Preceding station	Disused railways	Following station
Milton Road Halt	7/1906 to 30-4-1915; SECR; Hundred of Hoo Railway	Milton Range Halt
Gravesend Central	1-5-1915 to 31-12-1922; SECR; Hundred of Hoo Railway	Milton Range Halt
Gravesend Central	1-1-1923 to 16-9-1932; SR; Hundred of Hoo Railway	Milton Range Halt
Gravesend Central	17-9-1932 to 31-12-1947; SR; Hundred of Hoo Railway	Uralite Halt
Gravesend Central	1-1-1948 to 1956; BR (S); Hundred of Hoo Railway	Uralite Halt
Gravesend Central	1956 to 3-12-1961; BR(S); Hundred of Hoo Railway	Hoo Junction Staff Halt

== Sources ==
- R. W. Kidner (1985). Southern Railway Halts. Survey and Gazetteer. Headington, Oxford: The Oakwood Press. ISBN 0-85361-321-4.
