= Strood railway station =

Railway station in Kent, England

Strood
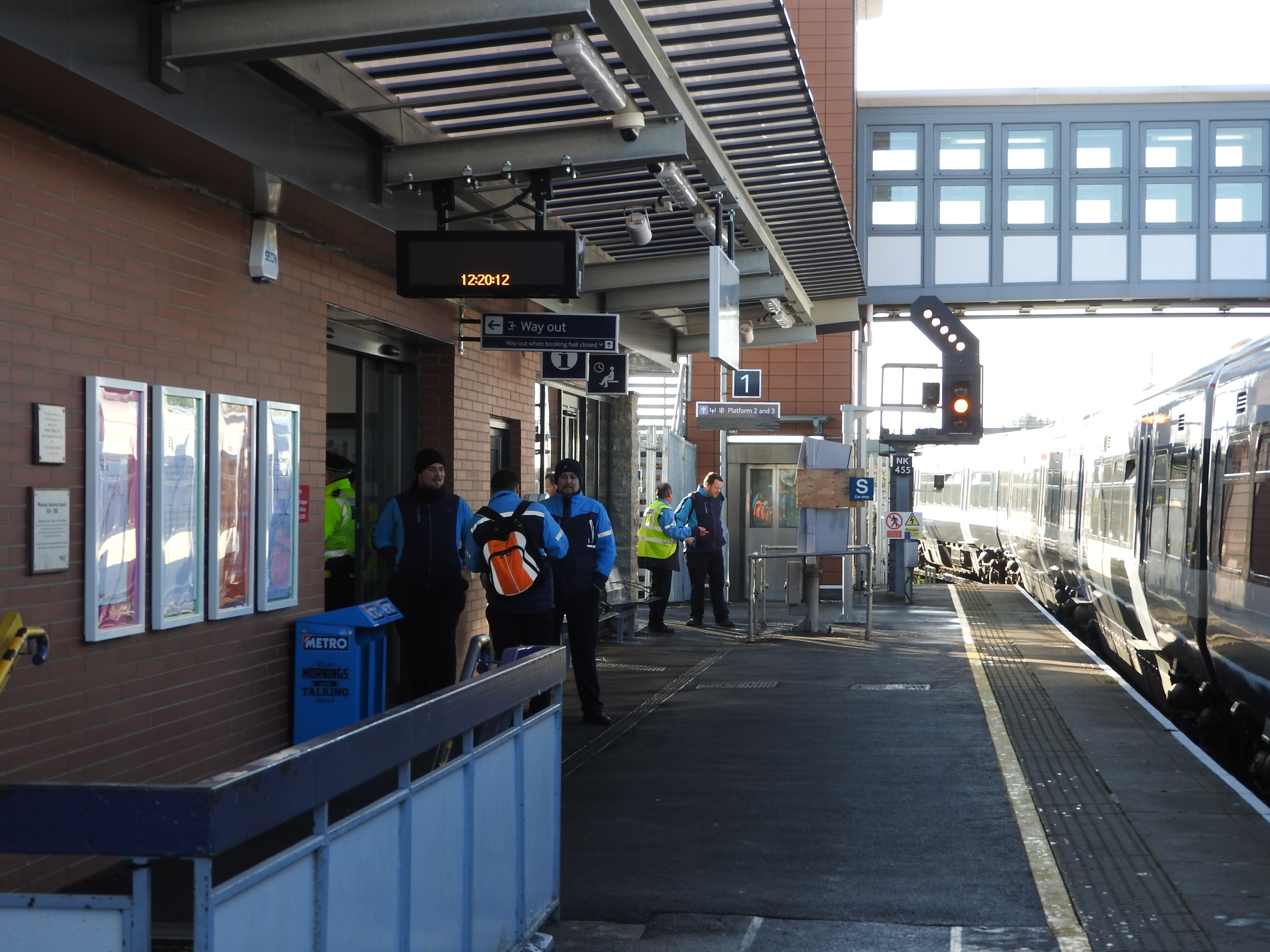
- The station in December 2017, after refurbishment

General information
- Location: Strood, Borough of Medway; England
- Coordinates: 51°23′48.33″N 0°30′1.69″E
- Grid reference: TQ740693
- Manager: Southeastern
- Platforms: 3

Other information
- Station code: SOO
- Classification: DfT category D

History
- Original company: South Eastern Railway
- Pre-grouping: South Eastern & Chatham Railway
- Post-grouping: Southern Railway

Key dates
- 1845: first station opened
- 18 June 1856: present station opened

Passengers
- 2020/21: ▼0.454 million
- Interchange: ▼0.134 million
- 2021/22: ▲0.872 million
- Interchange: ▲0.308 million
- 2022/23: ▲0.990 million
- Interchange: ▲0.384 million
- 2023/24: ▲1.054 million
- Interchange: ▲0.455 million
- 2024/25: ▲1.168 million
- Interchange: ▲0.534 million
Location
Notes
- Passenger statistics from the Office of Rail and Road

Strood railway station serves the town of Strood in Medway, England. It is on the North Kent Line and is also a terminus of the Medway Valley Line. It is 31 miles 11 chains (50.1 km) down the line from London Charing Cross.

Train services are operated by Southeastern and Thameslink.

== History ==
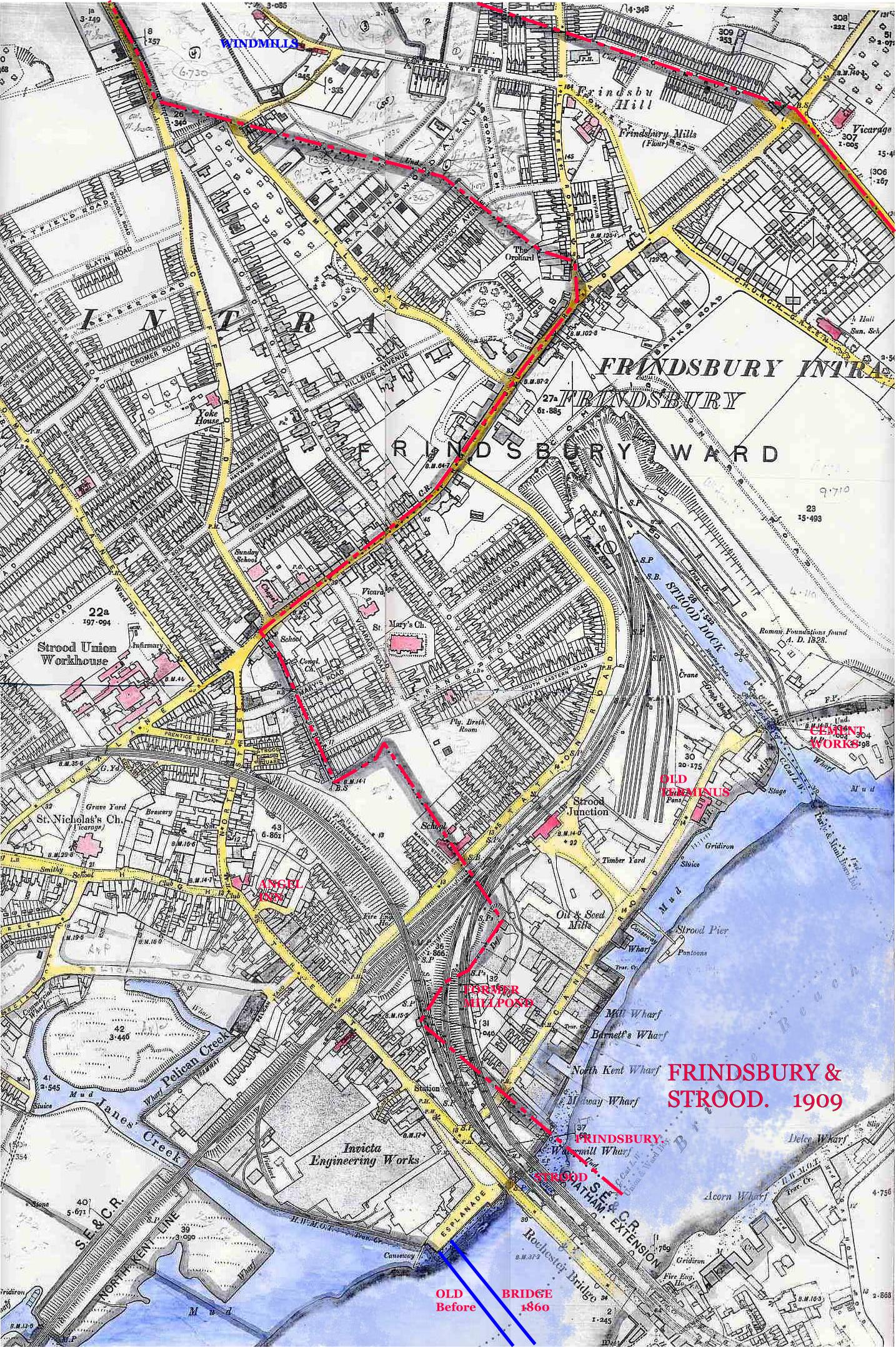
Strood railway station in 1909, note several details; The old SER terminus is where the sidings are to the right of the station. Also note the two lines over the Medway.

The South Eastern Railway (SER) had reached Strood in 1845 as the terminus of the line from Gravesend. In 1856, this line was linked to the existing Maidstone branch from Paddock Wood, which had opened in 1844. The new line left the line from Gravesend between Strood Tunnel and the original Strood terminus; a new Strood station was provided on the Maidstone line, and it opened with the line on 18 June 1856.

The station became a junction with the opening of the first section of the East Kent Railway (EKR) between Strood and Chatham on 29 March 1858. The London, Chatham & Dover Railway (which the EKR had become in 1859) soon opened their own route from Rochester towards London, the first portion as far as Bickley opening on 3 December 1860. The curve connecting the LCDR line with Strood station fell into disuse (apart from one goods train in each direction per day), but passenger services over this line were reintroduced in early 1877 at the insistence of the Mayor of Chatham. The Mayor's name was Toomer, and the line then became known as the "Toomer Loop".

Although Strood station was the property of the SER, the Toomer Loop, together with the stations at Rochester and Chatham, was LCDR property. A second junction at Strood was bought into use on 20 July 1891, when the first section of the Rochester & Chatham Extension was opened, by which SER trains reached their own stations at Rochester and, from 1 March 1892, Chatham. This line was to the north-east of, and largely ran parallel to, the LCDR line; it had its own bridge over the Medway. On 1 January 1899 the SER and LCDR entered into a working union which traded as the South Eastern & Chatham Railway (SE&CR) and set about eliminating duplicated facilities. In 1911, a connecting line was put in between the SER and LCDR on the south-eastern side of the SER's Rochester Bridge; this allowed trains from Strood to reach the LCDR stations at Rochester and Chatham from October 1911. In 1927 (after the SER & LCDR had merged with other railways to form the Southern Railway), another connecting line was put in between the former SER and LCDR routes on the north-eastern side of the SER's Rochester Bridge; this enabled the LCDR's bridge to be taken out of use.

Southeastern introduced a full timetable of domestic high-speed services branded Southeastern Highspeed over High Speed 1 between London St Pancras and Ashford International on 13 December 2009, although public preview services had been running since 29 June 2009. High-speed trains use High Speed 1 calling at Stratford International and Ebbsfleet International. Trains from London to the Medway towns and Faversham leave the high-speed line at Ebbsfleet and continue via the North Kent line through Gravesend, Strood, Rochester. A limited peak hour service now also operates between St Pancras and Maidstone West via Ebbsfleet and Strood.

At the same time there was the largest change to the timetable in the area in 40 years in order to accommodate the extra trains. This meant that rail services from Newington and Teynham were cut, in order to facilitate this new service. To use the train service over the High Speed 1 section of line generally requires payment of a surcharge.

In December 2017, the station received a £2.59 million refurbishment which included new entrances, a larger booking hall and a new waiting room.

== Facilities ==
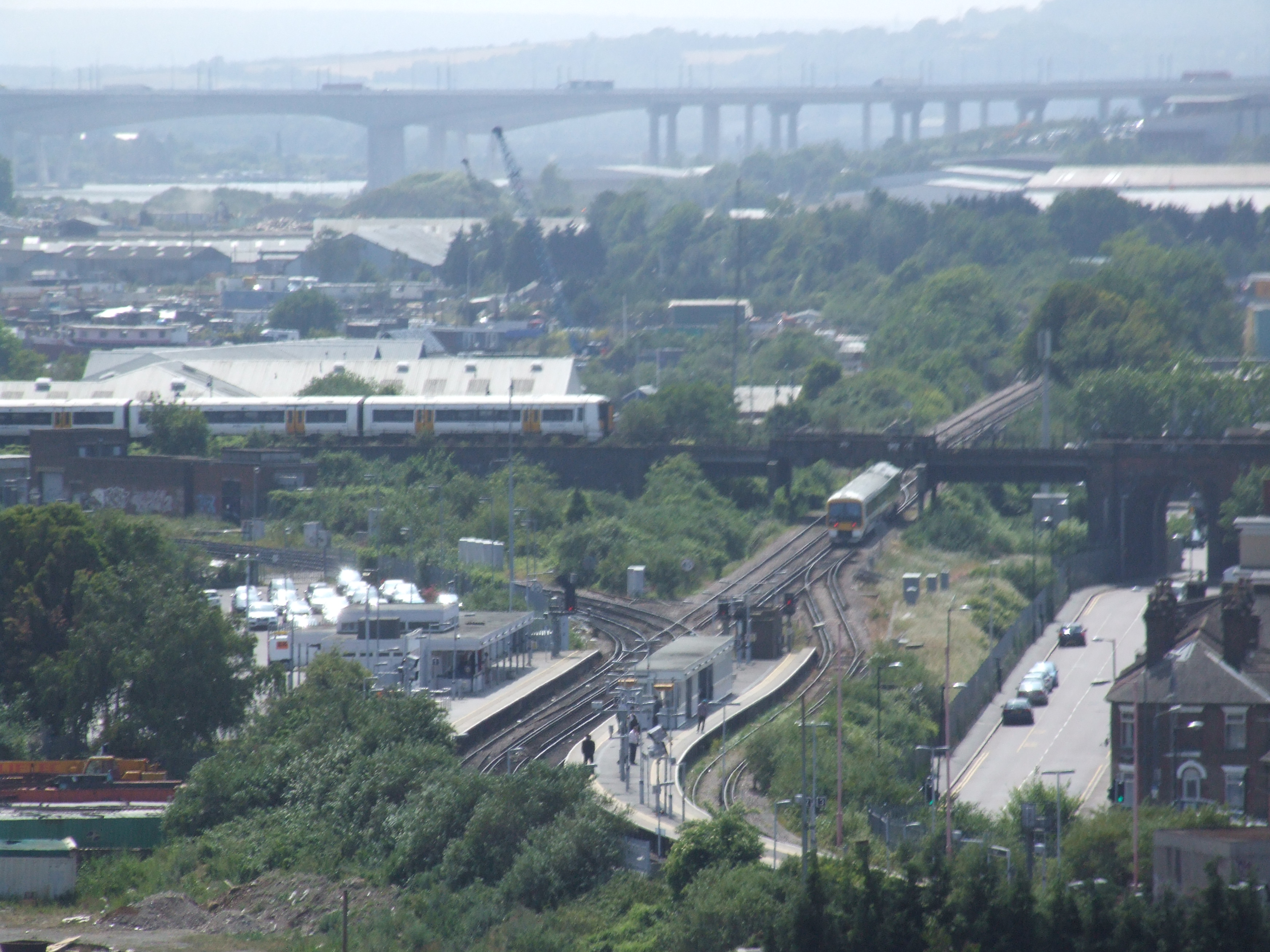
Strood station (lower centre) from the north-east. The train at centre left is on the viaduct carrying the Chatham Main Line. The train centre right is on the Medway Valley Line. Upper background are the viaducts carrying the M2 motorway and behind that the High Speed 1 rail line. The photo was taken before the bridge between platforms was built; from this viewpoint the bridge would be at the far end of the platforms.

The station has three platforms; Platform 1 is directly accessible from the station building. Platforms 2 and 3 are on an island platform. The entrance, ticket office and ticket barriers adjoin Platform 1, with a tunnel from that platform leading to the island. In 2014, a new bridge with lifts was built at the southern end of the station to replace the tunnel and provide wheelchair access to the island platform. As of summer 2015 both the bridge and tunnel are open.

Platforms 2 and 1 mainly handle traffic to and from London respectively, with Maidstone West, Tonbridge and Paddock Wood services terminating at and returning from Platform 3.

Until the early 1980s, an additional entrance to the station was located on Station Road. The entrance was a continuation of the station subway, the external building is still extant on Station Road, although all windows and doors have been bricked up. The building contained a small ticket office.

== Services ==
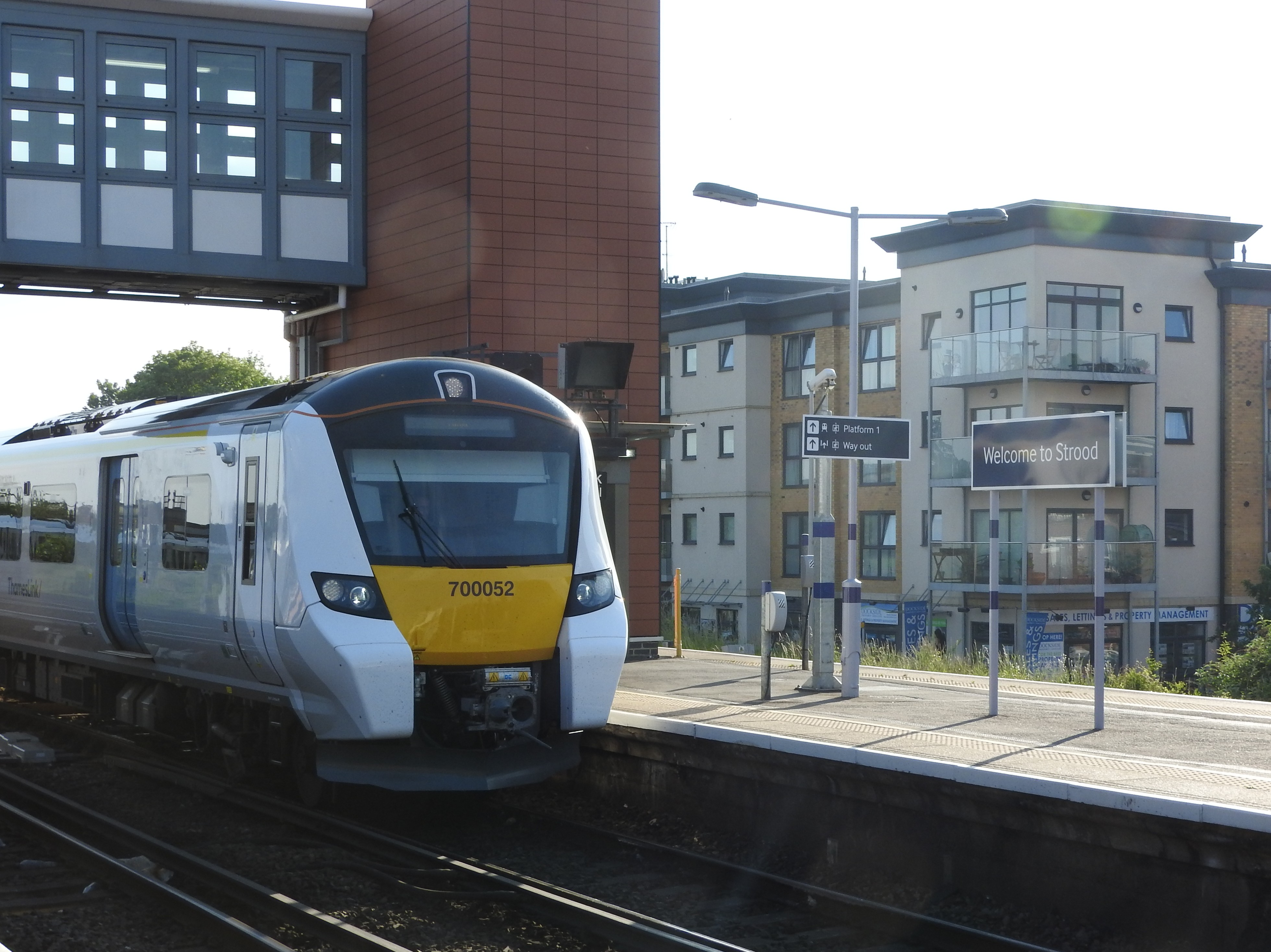
One of the first Thameslink trains in May 2018

Services at Strood are operated by Southeastern and Thameslink using Class 375, 395, 465, 466 and 700 EMUs.

The typical off-peak service in trains per hour is:

- 2 tph to Luton via Dartford and Greenwich
- 2 tph to London St Pancras International
- 2 tph to Rainham
- 1 tph to Faversham
- 1 tph to Ramsgate
- 2 tph to Paddock Wood via Maidstone West

Additional services, including trains to and from London Charing Cross via Sidcup, and two daily return services between London St Pancras International and Maidstone West call at the station during the peak hours.

The station is also served by a small number of early morning, mid afternoon and late evening services that continue beyond Paddock Wood to and from Tonbridge.

Preceding station	National Rail	Following station
Gravesend	Southeastern High Speed 1	Rochester
Gravesend	Southeastern High Speed 1	Snodland Peak Hours Only
Terminus	Southeastern Medway Valley Line	Cuxton
Higham	Southeastern North Kent Line Peak Hours Only	Rochester
Higham	Thameslink North Kent Line	Rochester
	Disused railways	
Higham Line and station open	South Eastern Railway Chatham Extension	Rochester Bridge Line and station closed
