= Thames and Medway Canal =

Canal in Kent, England

Coordinates: 51°24′54″N 0°28′53″E

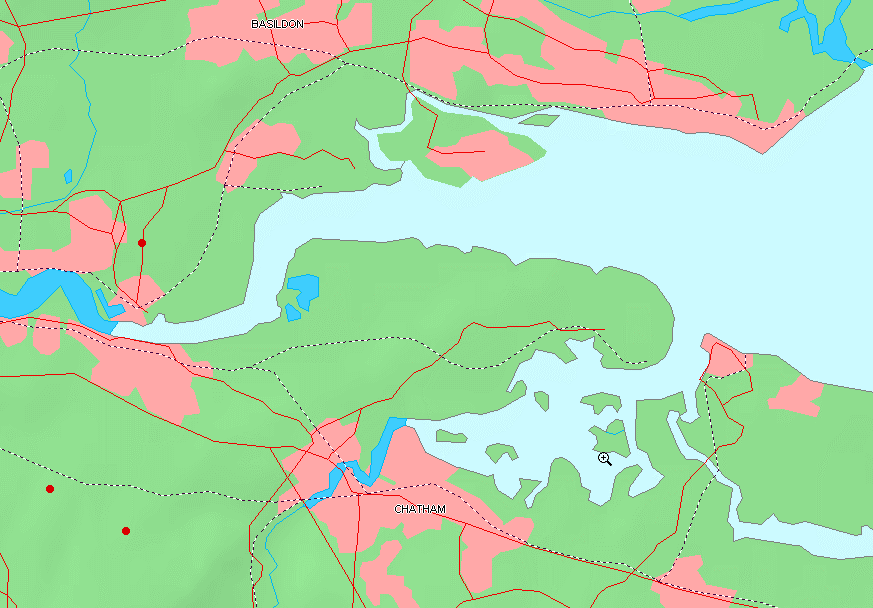
The canal's route is close to the dashed line of the railway across the neck of the peninsula. It joins the River Thames at Gravesend (north-west) to the River Medway at Strood (south-east)

The Thames and Medway Canal is a disused canal in Kent, south east England, also known as the Gravesend and Rochester Canal. It was originally some 11 km (6.8 mi) long and cut across the neck of the Hoo peninsula, linking the River Thames at Gravesend with the River Medway at Strood. The canal was first mooted in 1778 as a shortcut for military craft from Deptford and Woolwich Dockyards on the Thames to Chatham Dockyard on the Medway, avoiding the 74 km (46 mi) journey round the peninsula and through the Thames estuary. The canal was also intended to take commercial traffic between the two rivers.

== Construction ==
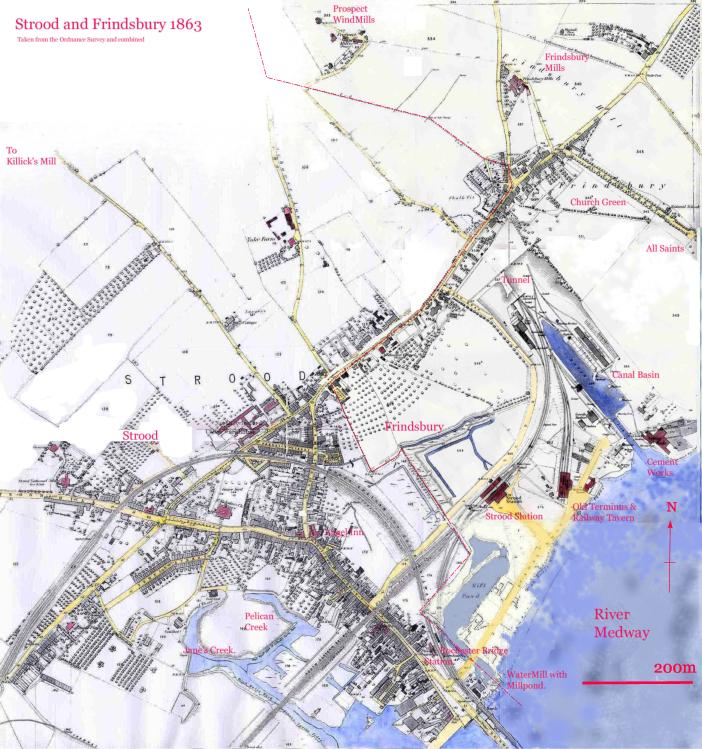
From the Strood basin (centre right), the canal disappeared almost immediately into the tunnel

The first practical attempt to build the canal began in 1799, when Ralph Dodd published a pamphlet and began to solicit investment for the scheme. Dodd's plan was for a 6-mile (9.7 km) canal with locks and basins, taking two years to build and costing £24,576, part of the cost to be defrayed by selling the excavated chalk as agricultural lime. Dodd was confident that the canal would be useful to the government but would also attract commercial vessels.

Thames and Medway Canal Act 1800
- Act of Parliament
- Parliament of Great Britain
- Long title: An Act for making and maintaining a navigable Canal from the River Thames, near to the Town of Gravesend, in the County of Kent, to the River Medway, at a Place called Nicholson's Ship-Yard, in the Parish of Frindsbury, in the said County; and also a certain Collateral Cut, from White Wall in the said Parish, to the said River Medway.
- Citation: 39 & 40 Geo. 3. c. xxiii
- Territorial extent: Great Britain

Dates
- Royal assent: 16 May 1800
- Commencement: 16 May 1800 (Note: The Acts of Parliament (Commencement) Act 1793.)
Other legislation
Amended by	Thames and Medway Canal Act 1810; Thames and Medway Canal Act 1818; South Eastern Railway (No. 4) Act 1846; British Railways Act 1969

Status: Amended

Text of statute as originally enacted

In 1800 the canal company received the necessary act of Parliament, the Thames and Medway Canal Act 1800 (39 & 40 Geo. 3. c. xxiii), and work began at the Gravesend end. The estimated cost had now risen to £57,433.

Thames and Medway Canal Act 1810
- Act of Parliament
- Parliament of the United Kingdom
- Long title: An Act for enabling the Company of Proprietors of the Thames and Medway Canal to vary the Line of the said Canal; and for altering and enlarging the Powers of Two Acts passed in the Fortieth and Forty fourth Years of His present Majesty, for making the said Canal and a Collateral Cut thereto.
- Citation: 50 Geo. 3. c. lxxvi
- Territorial extent: United Kingdom

Dates
- Royal assent: 18 May 1810
- Commencement: 18 May 1810
Other legislation
Amended by	Thames and Medway Canal Act 1818; Thames and Medway Canal Act 1824; South Eastern Railway (No. 4) Act 1846; Southern Railway Act 1933

Status: Amended

Text of statute as originally enacted

From the Gravesend basin, the canal began with a straight section aligned with New Tavern Fort, Gravesend. By 1801 it ran 4 miles (6.4 km) to Higham. A new engineer, Ralph Walker, arrived and announced that the whole canal would cost significantly more than the revised estimate. Work halted, and by 1804 Dodd had probably left the project. Over the next few years, Walker suggested two new routes for the Higham to Strood stretch, for which acts of Parliament were obtained and money raised. His second route was decided on but required a tunnel through the chalk hills; work on this did not start until 1819. The canal finally opened on 14 October 1824, by which time the Napoleonic wars were long over and the military need had greatly diminished. The canal had taken five acts of Parliament and cost some £260,000.

== Operating problems ==
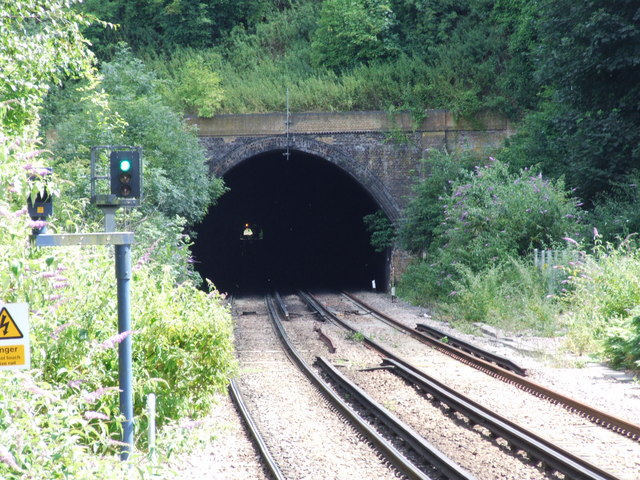
The Higham portal to the straight tunnel

The canal was 13 m (43 ft) wide and carried the Thames sailing barges common on both rivers. It was intended that the canal would be used for the transport of hops and other locally grown produce, but it was not a commercial success. It had locks at each end to protect the water level from tidal change, but the canal walls leaked and the water level dropped between every spring tide. A steam-driven pumping station was built to rectify this.

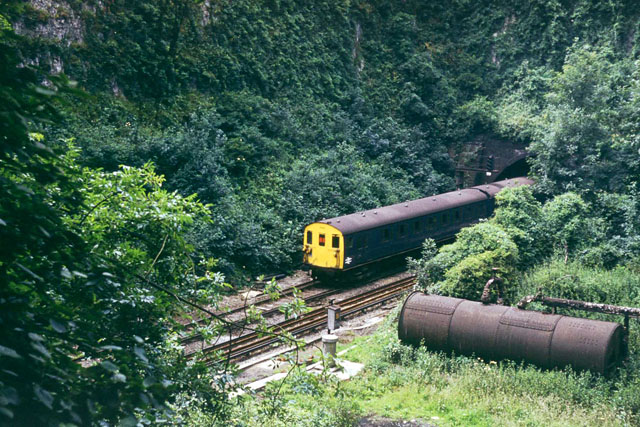
The passing place- now used by the railway

Complaints then came from barge-owners that the tunnel was slow to use, so in 1830 it was shut for two months while an open-air passing place was dug in the middle. This 100-yard long cutting divided the tunnel into a separate Higham tunnel and Strood tunnel. The canal tolls reflected these improvements, but if a boat missed the tide it would have to wait in the canal basin for longer than the journey round Hoo would have taken.

== Higham and Strood tunnel ==
The Higham and Strood tunnel is 3.5 km (2.2 mi) long, and was the second longest canal tunnel built in the UK (the longest is the Standedge Canal Tunnel). It was also the largest: 10.7 m (35 ft) high from arch to canal bed, 6.6 m (22 ft) wide at the water line, a further 1.5 m (4.9 ft) wide at towpath level, and had water 2.4 m (7.9 ft) deep. These dimensions could accommodate a 60 tonne sailing barge with its mast lowered.

The tunnel was dug through the chalk using only hand tools, but occasionally gunpowder was used. Several workmen were killed in rockfalls. It was considered an engineering wonder of its time.

The tunnel is so perfectly straight, that a person placed at one end, may discern a small light entering at the other extremity [...] On the opening of the tunnel, a small steam passage boat was employed for the conveyance of passengers from Gravesend to Rochester, and vice versa; but as it was found to injure the towing-path of the tunnel, as well as the banks of the canal, it was discontinued. Foot passengers, however, still pass to and fro, though some caution is necessary, to avoid coming into contact with the horse, or horses, towing the barges.

—Tallis Directory

1839

=== Sharing with the railway ===
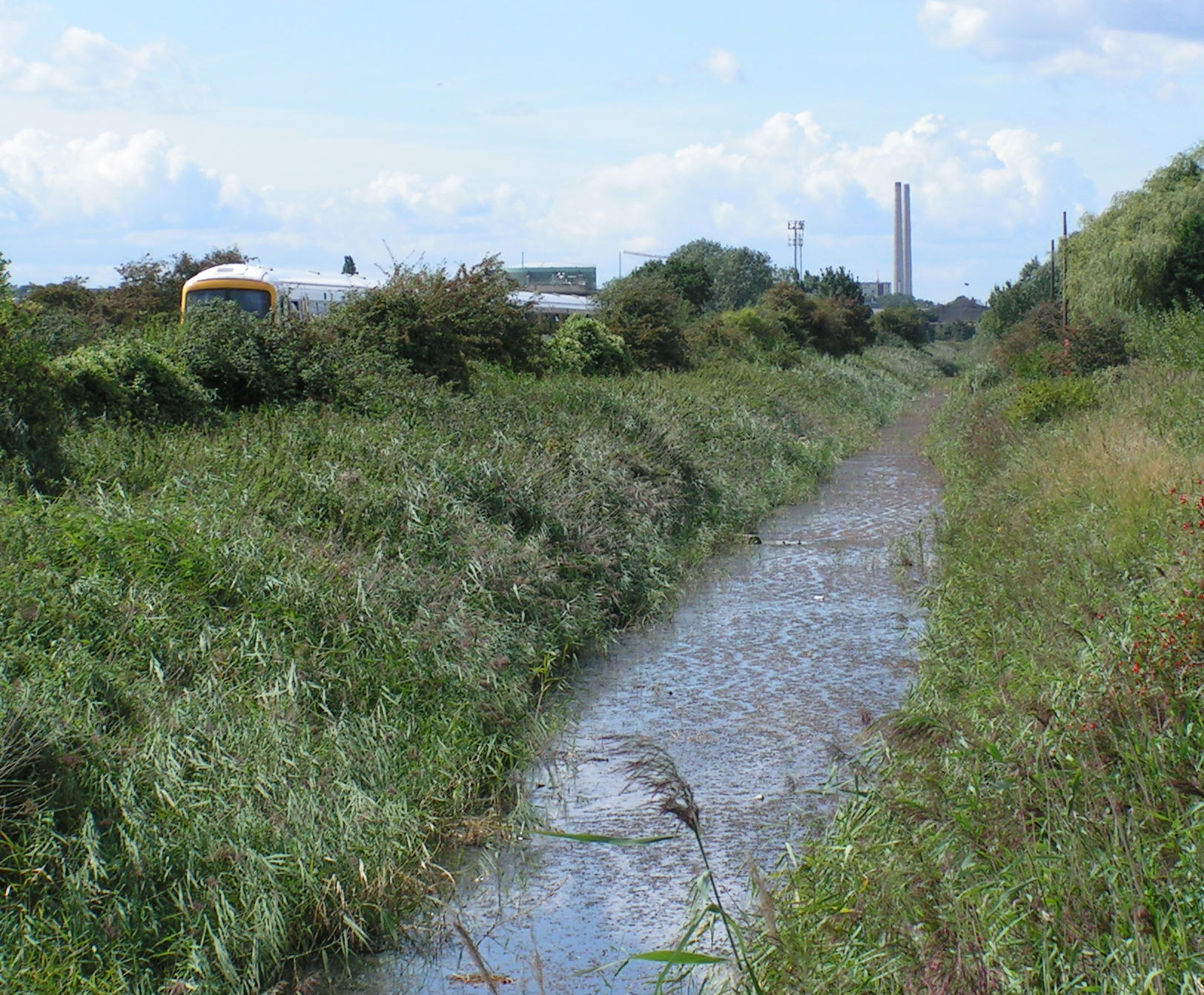
Thames and Medway canal in overgrown state, with railway line adjacent

From 1845 the newly built railway between Gravesend and Strood shared the tunnel with the canal, a single track resting partially on the towpath and partially on wooden stakes in the water.

The ride through the dreary tunnel with the dark waters of the canal beneath us, and an insecure chalk roof above our heads, enlivened as it is by occasional shrieks from the engine's vaporous lungs, and the unceasing rattle of the train, is apt to make one feel somewhat nervous; and the first glimpse of bright daylight that breaks upon us, relieves us from a natural anxiety as to the chances we run of being crushed by the fall of some twenty tons of chalk from above, or being precipitated into twenty feet of water beneath, with the doors of the carriages locked and no "Nautilus belt" around our waists and not even a child's caul in our pocket. This relief is however temporary, for the light only breaks in through a gap in the tunnel, and some more experienced traveller informs us we are only half out of it. However, our journey is brought to a close without any accident: and we embark on the steamer that is to deposit us at Chatham.

—William Orr, 1847

In 1846 the canal company sold the tunnel to the South Eastern Railway company, which filled the canal and laid a double railway track over it. This was part of the North Kent Line. The canal towing contractor's home was converted into the ticket office for Higham railway station.

Orr's fears of a chalk fall, however, were not unfounded. Over the years, there have been many roof falls, most small. But in December 1999 a fall near Strood derailed a train, fortunately without causing serious injuries (but leaving a hole in the ground in an orchard). Some 60% of the tunnel had by this date been lined: in 2004 it was closed to line the remainder and renew the track, reopening a year later on 17 January 2005.

== 1846 to today ==
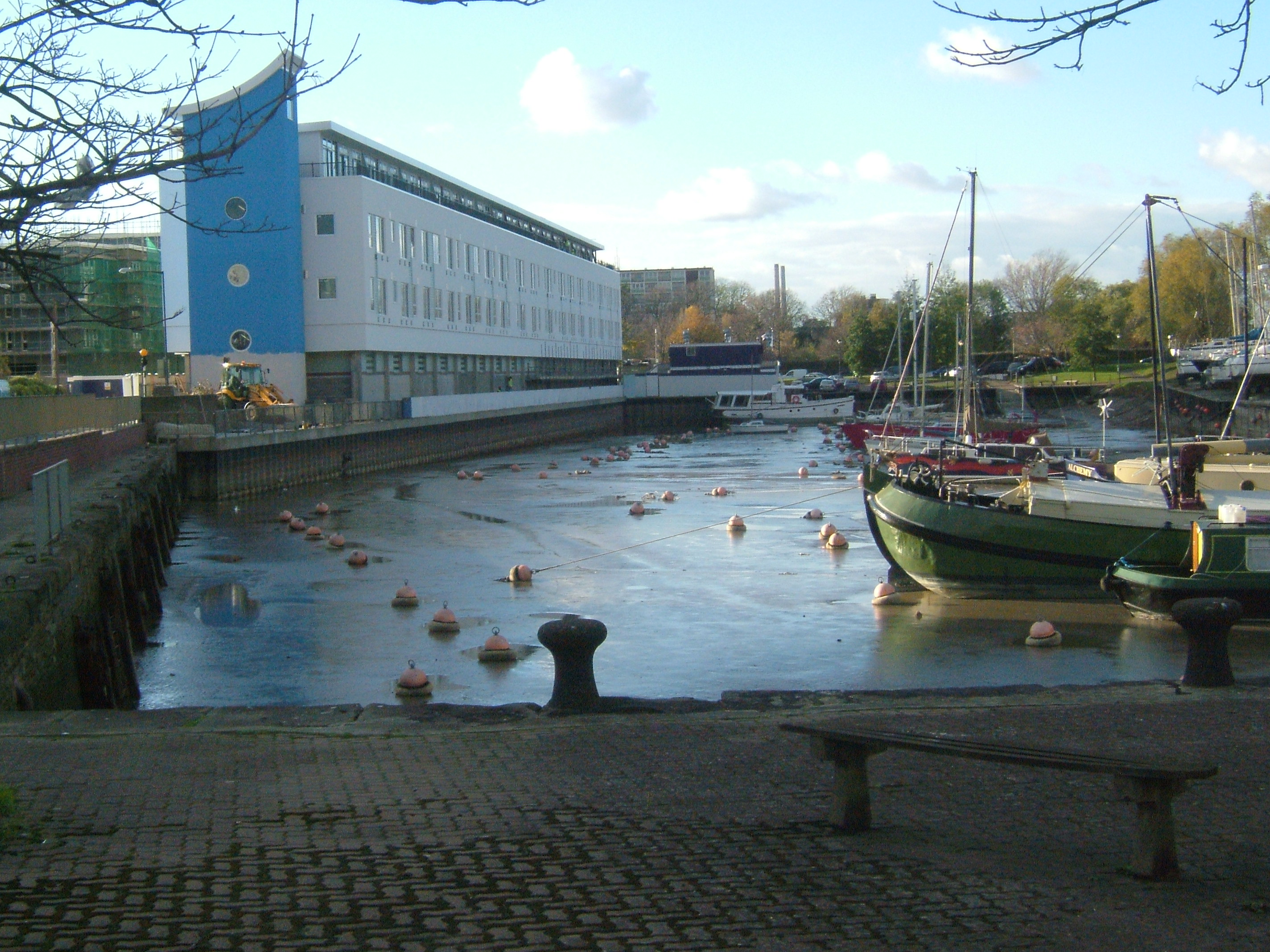
The Gravesend basin

The remainder of the canal, between Higham and Gravesend, continued to be used until 1934. It suffered bomb damage during World War II, and some areas have been back-filled or are choked with reed growth. The Strood canal basin, long orphaned by the loss of the tunnel, was back-filled in 1986 and has now been built over.

Since 1976 the canal has been in the hands of the Thames & Medway Canal Association (TMCA), which has dredged some areas. British Rail restored one of the swing bridges. The towpath has recently been renovated for use by pedestrians and cyclists. It now forms part of Route 1 of the National Cycle Network from Dover to John o' Groats. For walkers, it forms part of circular walks linked to the Saxon Shore Way.

There are now plans to fully renovate the canal and make it a focal point of development in Gravesend, to benefit the town while meeting the Thames Gateway project's demands for housebuilding. In October 2004, the Gravesend canal basin was dredged, after which the lock gates into the Thames were renovated, enabling the basin to be used by boats from the river. The line of the canal has been protected from development since 1992.

== See also ==
- Canals of the United Kingdom
- History of the British canal system
