= Sebastian Foxley =

Sebastian Foxley may refer to:

- The protagonist of a series of medieval murder mysteries by British writer Toni Mount
- A character in 2010s comic book series Thief of Thieves
