= Gravesend =

Town in Kent, England

Coordinates: 51.4415°N 0.3685°E

- Town
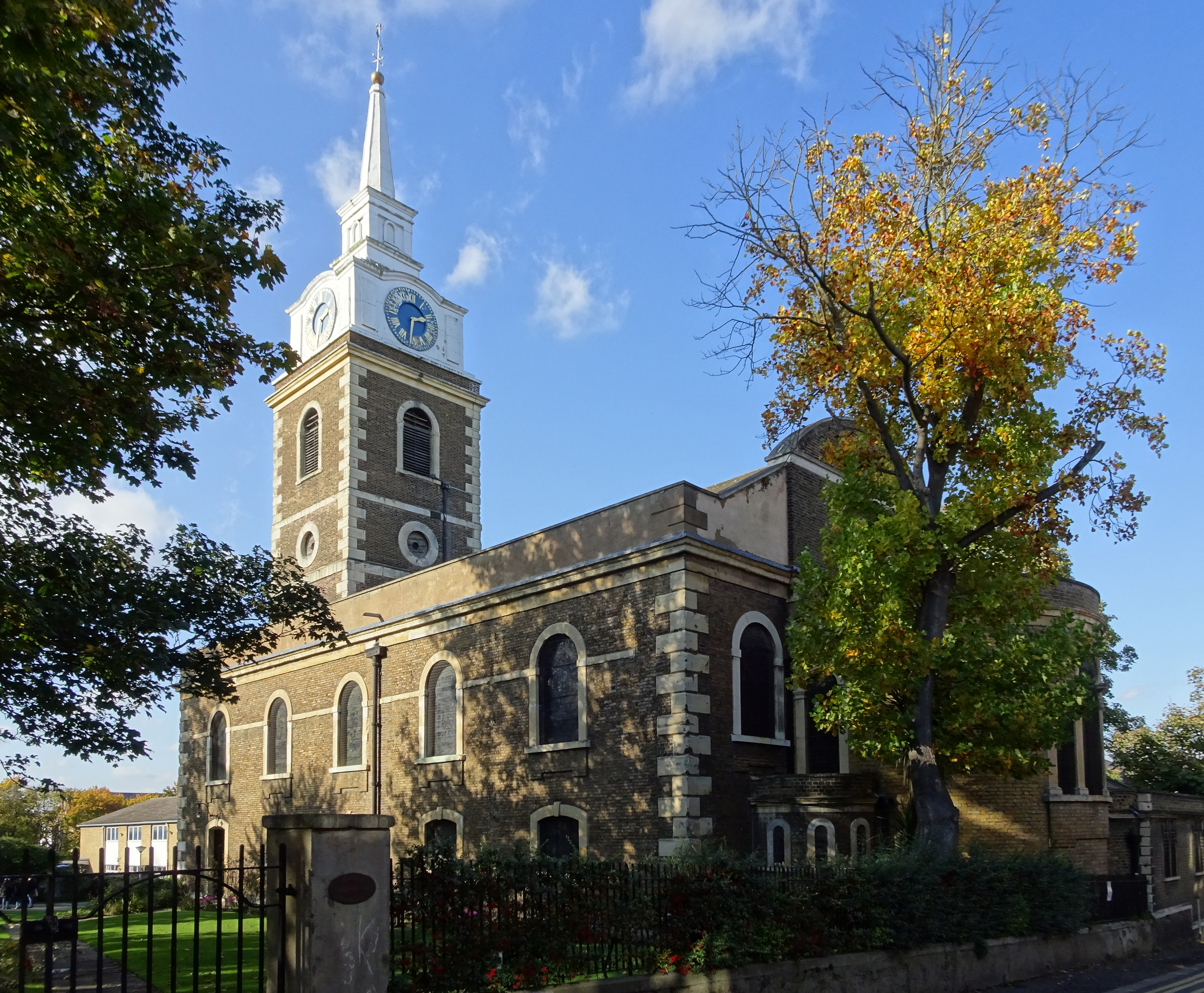
- St George’s Church, burial place of Pocahontas

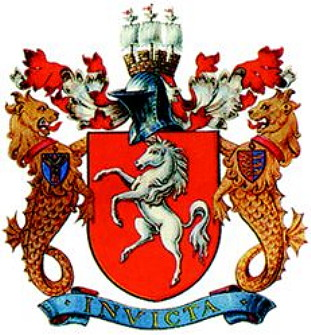
- Kent coat of arms

- Location within Kent
- Population: 58,102 (2021 Census)
- OS grid reference: TQ647740
- District: Gravesham
- Shire county: Kent
- Region: South East
- Country: England
- Sovereign state: United Kingdom
- Post town: GRAVESEND
- Postcode district: DA11, DA12
- Dialling code: 01474
- Police: Kent
- Fire: Kent
- Ambulance: South East Coast
- UK Parliament: Gravesham

Gravesend /ˌɡreɪvzˈɛnd/ is a town in northwest Kent, England, situated 21 miles (35 km) east-southeast of Charing Cross (central London) on the south bank of the River Thames, opposite Tilbury in Essex. Located in the Diocese of Rochester, it is the administrative centre of the borough of Gravesham. Gravesend marks the eastern limit of the Greater London Built-up Area, as defined by the UK Office for National Statistics. It had a population of 58,102 in 2021.

Its geographical situation has given Gravesend strategic importance throughout the maritime and communications history of South East England. A Thames Gateway commuter town, it retains strong links with the River Thames, not least through the Port of London Authority Pilot Station, and has witnessed rejuvenation since the advent of High Speed 1 rail services via Gravesend railway station.

== Name ==
The first known mention of the settlement is as Gravesham in the Domesday Book of 1086, when it is recorded as belonging to Odo, Earl of Kent, the half-brother of William the Conqueror. Subsequent records (c. 1100 onwards) such as Domesday Monachorum and Textus Roffensis have the names Gravesend and Gravesende, respectively. The variation Graveshend can be seen in a court record of 1422, where Edmund de Langeford was parson, and attributed to where the graves ended after the Black Death. The municipal title "Gravesham" was formally adopted in 1974 as the name for the new borough.

Several theories about its etymology have been posited. It may derive from graaf-ham: the home of the reeve or bailiff of the lord of the manor. Paul Theroux suggested the town bore the name of Gravesend because east of it, the dead had to be buried at sea. Frank Carr asserts that the name derives from the Saxon Gerevesend, the end of the authority of the Portreeve (originally Portgereve, chief town administrator).

In the Netherlands, a place called 's-Gravenzande is found with its name translating into "sand (or sandy area) belonging to the count". The 's is a contraction of the old Dutch genitive article des, and translates into plain English as of the. In Brooklyn, New York, the neighbourhood of Gravesend is said by some to have been named for 's-Gravenzande, though its founding by the English religious dissenter Lady Deborah Moody in 1645 suggests that it may be named after Gravesend, England. Lady Deborah was originally from London and is credited with being the first woman to found a settlement in the New World.

== History ==
Stone Age implements have been found in the locality since the 1900s, as has evidence of an Iron Age settlement at nearby Springhead. Extensive Roman remains have been found at nearby Vagniacae, and Gravesend lies immediately to the north of the Roman road connecting London with the Kent coast – now called Watling Street. Domesday Book recorded mills, hythes, and fisheries here.

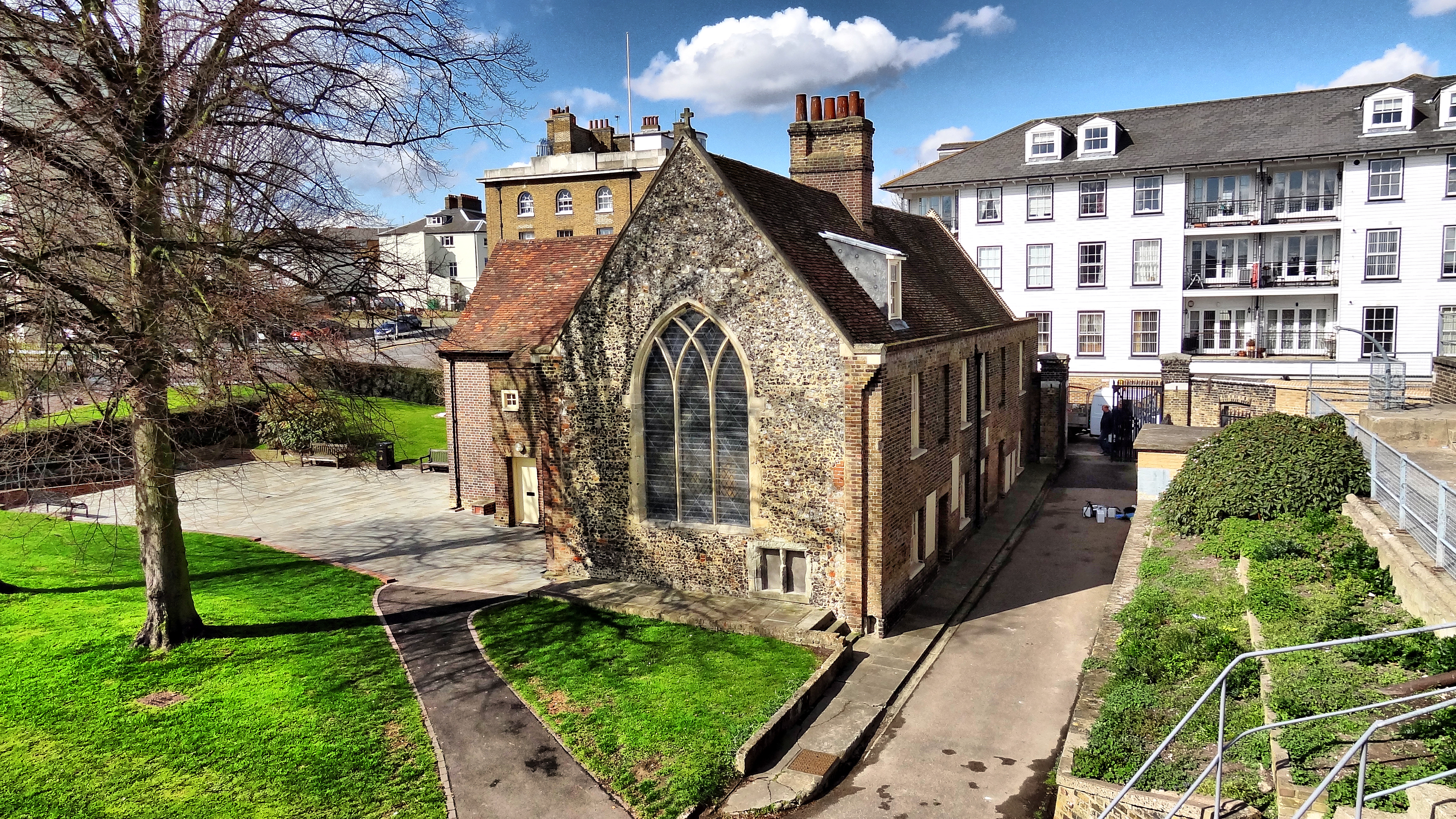
Milton Chantry, built c. 1320

Milton Chantry is Gravesend's oldest surviving building and dates from the early 14th century. It was refounded as a chapel in 1320/21 on the original site of a former leper hospital founded in 1189. It is a Grade II* listed building.

Gravesend has one of the oldest surviving markets in the country. Its earliest charter dates from 1268, with town status being granted to the two parishes of Gravesend and Milton by King Henry III in its Charter of Incorporation of that year. The first mayor of Gravesend was elected in 1268 but the first town hall was not built until 1573. The current Gravesend Town Hall was completed in 1764: although it ceased to operate as a seat of government in 1968 when the new Gravesham Civic Centre was opened, it remained in use as a magistrates' court until 2000. It now operates as a venue for weddings and civil partnership ceremonies.

In 1380, during the Hundred Years' War, Gravesend was raided by a French fleet.

In 1401, a further royal charter was granted, allowing the men of the town to operate boats between London and the town; these became known as the "Long Ferry". It became the preferred form of passage, because of the perils of road travel (see below).

On Gravesend's river front are the remains of a device fort built by command of King Henry VIII in 1543. In March 1617, John Rolfe and his Native American wife Rebecca (Pocahontas), with their two-year-old son, Thomas, boarded a ship in London bound for the Commonwealth of Virginia; the ship had only sailed as far as Gravesend before Rebecca fell ill, and she died shortly after she was taken ashore. It is not known what caused her death. Her funeral and interment took place on 21 March 1617 at the parish church of St George, Gravesend. The site of her grave was underneath the church's chancel, though since the previous church was destroyed by fire in 1727 her exact resting place is unknown. Thomas Rolfe survived, but was placed under the supervision of Sir Lewis Stukley at Plymouth, before being sent to his uncle, Henry Rolfe whilst John Rolfe and his late wife's assistant Tomocomo reached America under the captaincy of Sir Samuel Argall's ship. Pocahontas (real name: Matoaka) is an important figure in both American and British history.

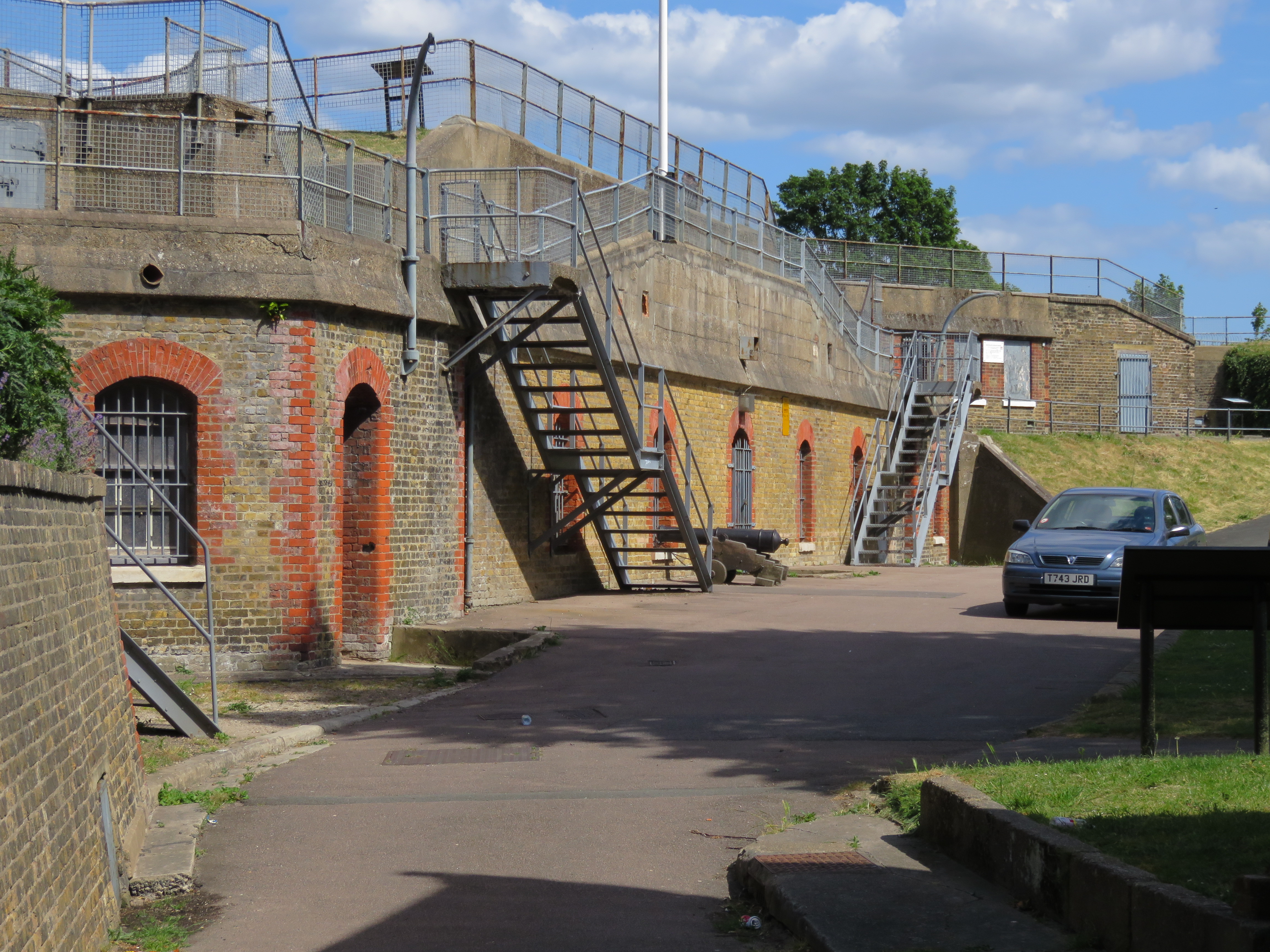
Interior of New Tavern Fort

At Fort Gardens is the New Tavern Fort, built during the 1780s and extensively rebuilt by Major-General Charles Gordon between 1865 and 1879; it is now the Chantry Heritage Centre, under the care of Gravesend Local History Society. The fort is a scheduled monument.

Journeys by road to Gravesend were historically quite hazardous, since the main London-Dover road crossed Blackheath, notorious for its highwaymen. Stagecoaches from London to Canterbury, Dover and Faversham used Gravesend as one of their "stages" as did those coming north from Tonbridge. In 1840 there were 17 coaches picking up and setting down passengers and changing horses each way per day. There were two coaching inns on what is now Old Road East: the Prince of Orange and the Lord Nelson. Post coaches had been plying the route for at least two centuries: Samuel Pepys records having stopped off at Gravesend in 1650 en route to the Royal Dockyards at Chatham.

A permanent military presence was established in the town when Milton Barracks opened in 1862.

Although much of the town's economy continued to be connected with maritime trade, since the 19th century other major employers have been the cement and paper industries.

From 1932 to 1956, an airport was located to the east of the town. On Sunday 5 February 1939, Alex Henshaw commenced his record-breaking flight to Cape Town and back from here. He completed the flight in 39 hours 36 minutes over the next four days; his record still stands. Originally a civilian airfield, during World War II it became a fighter station, RAF Gravesend, and so Gravesend was heavily bombed by the Luftwaffe. In 1956 the site was taken over by Gravesend Borough Council; a large housing estate, known as Riverview Park, was built on its site.

== Governance ==
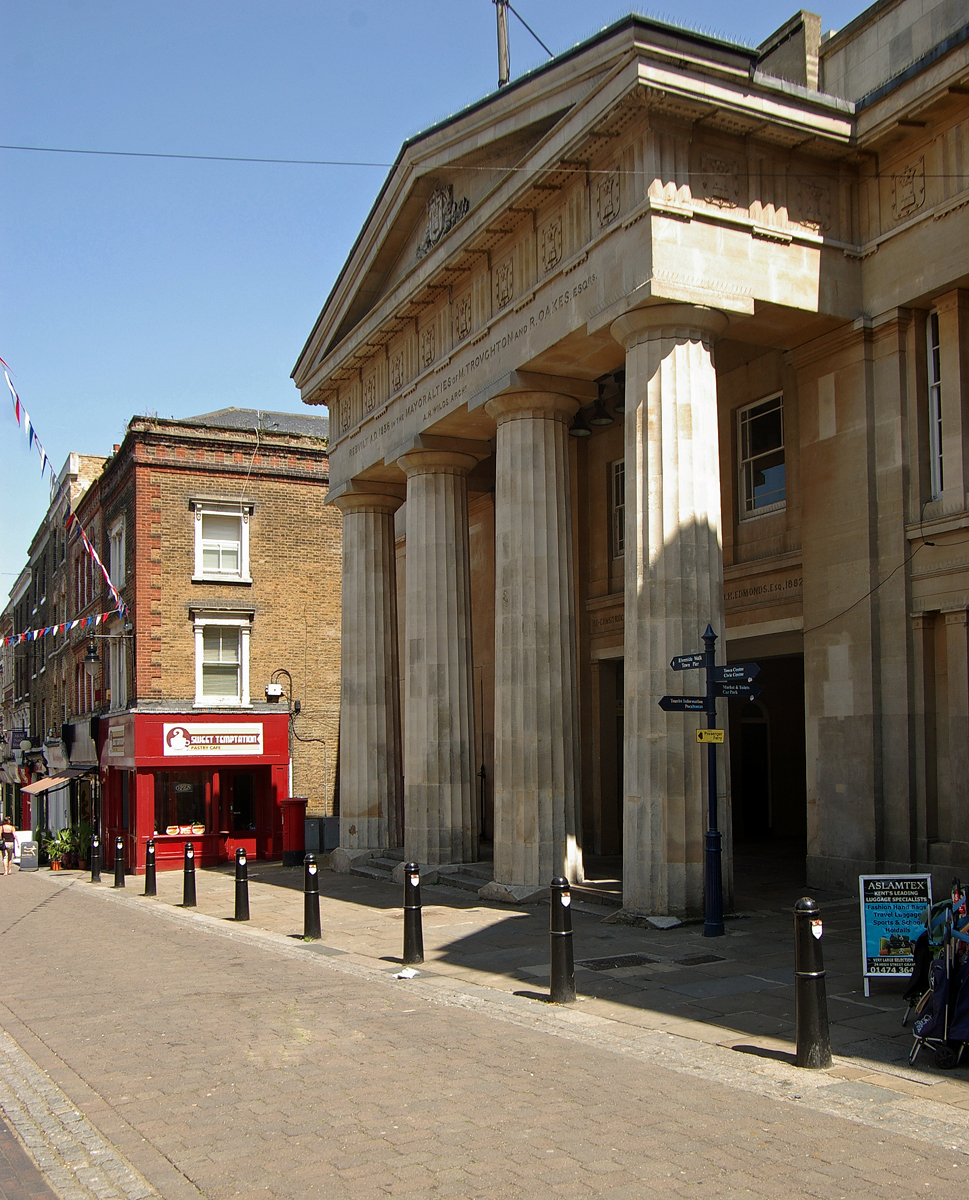
Gravesend Town Hall

Gravesend is the principal town of the Borough of Gravesham. The borough was formed on 1 April 1974, under the Local Government Act 1972, by the merger of the Municipal Borough of Gravesend and Northfleet Urban District Council along with several parishes from Strood Rural District. Gravesend was incorporated as a Municipal Borough in 1835 under the Municipal Corporations Act 1835 and Northfleet was constituted an Urban District in 1894 under the Local Government Act 1894: Gravesend absorbed Milton (1914), Denton, Chalk and part of Northfleet, including Claphall, Singlewell and King's Farm (1935).

== Geography ==
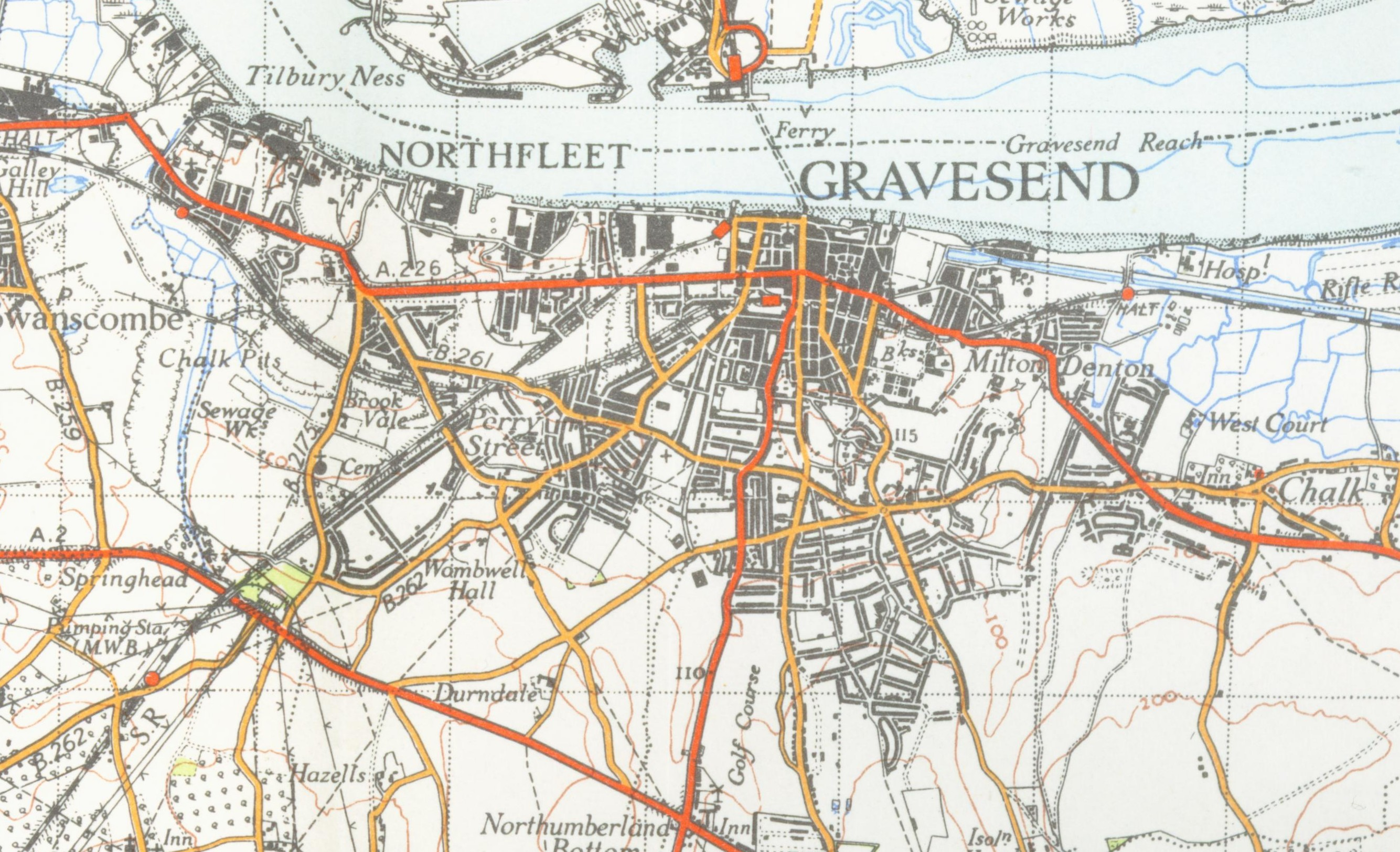
A 1946 map of Gravesend

Gravesend is located at a point where the higher land, the lowest point of the dip slope of the North Downs, reaches the Thames. To the east are the low-lying Shorne Marshes; to the west lie Northfleet and the Swanscombe Marshes. The settlement developed in this location due to its suitability as a landing place, sheltered by the prominent height of what is now known as Windmill Hill (see Landmarks below). Although the hill remains a dominant feature, Gravesend's highest point is actually further inland at Marling Cross, adjacent to the A2.

In 1817, Gravesend, Kent, was described as a market town and the first port on the River Thames, containing 536 houses and 31,119 inhabitants. From these origins as a landing place and shipping port, Gravesend gradually extended southwards and eastwards. Better-off London residents began visiting the town during the summer months, initially by boat and later via railway. More extensive development followed after World War I, with further expansion after World War II, when many of the surrounding housing estates were constructed, some with the assistance of German prisoners of war.

Gravesend's built-up areas now include Painters Ash, adjacent to the A2; King's Farm, most of which was developed in the 1920s; and Christianfields, which was completely rebuilt in a six-year project between 2007 and 2013. The Riverview Park estate, built on a former RAF airfield in the south-east during the 1960s, and Singlewell, located adjacent to the A2 in the south, also form part of the town. Part of the southern built-up area of Gravesend was originally made up of two separate rural parishes, Cobham and Northfleet.

== Climate ==
Gravesend has an oceanic climate similar to much of southern England, being accorded Köppen Climate Classification-subtype of "Cfb" (Marine West Coast Climate).

On 10 August 2003, Gravesend recorded one of the highest temperatures since records began in the United Kingdom, with a reading of 38.1 °C (100.6 °F), only beaten by Brogdale, near Faversham, 26 miles (42 km) to the ESE. Gravesend, which has a Met Office site, reports its data each hour.

Being inland and yet relatively close to continental Europe, Gravesend enjoys a somewhat more continental climate than the coastal areas of Kent, Essex and East Anglia and also compared to western parts of Britain. It is therefore less cloudy, drier, and less prone to Atlantic depressions with their associated wind and rain than western parts, as well as being hotter in summer and colder in winter.

Thus Gravesend continues to record higher temperatures in summer, sometimes being the hottest place in the country, e.g. on the warmest day of 2011, when temperatures reached 33.1 °C. Additionally, the town holds at least two records for the year 2010, of 30.9 °C and 31.7 °C. Another record was set during England's Indian summer of 2011 with 29.9 °C., the highest temperature ever recorded in the UK for October. In 2016 the warmest day of the year occurred very late on 13 September with a very high temperature of 34.4C

Climate data for Stanford-le-Hope (nearest climate station to Gravesend) 1981–2010
Month	Jan	Feb	Mar	Apr	May	Jun	Jul	Aug	Sep	Oct	Nov	Dec	Year
Record high °C (°F)	16.2 (61.2)	20.4 (68.7)	23.1 (73.6)	27.7 (81.9)	31.3 (88.3)	34.7 (94.5)	36.0 (96.8)	38.1 (100.6)	34.4 (93.9)	29.9 (85.8)	20.2 (68.4)	17.1 (62.8)	38.1 (100.6)
Mean daily maximum °C (°F)	7.9 (46.2)	8.0 (46.4)	10.9 (51.6)	13.2 (55.8)	16.8 (62.2)	19.9 (67.8)	22.1 (71.8)	22.2 (72.0)	19.4 (66.9)	15.2 (59.4)	10.8 (51.4)	8.1 (46.6)	14.5 (58.2)
Mean daily minimum °C (°F)	2.2 (36.0)	1.6 (34.9)	3.3 (37.9)	4.7 (40.5)	7.5 (45.5)	10.5 (50.9)	13.0 (55.4)	12.5 (54.5)	10.3 (50.5)	7.4 (45.3)	4.4 (39.9)	2.4 (36.3)	6.7 (44.0)
Record low °C (°F)	−13.8 (7.2)	−13.2 (8.2)	−8.7 (16.3)	−3.2 (26.2)	0.8 (33.4)	2.1 (35.8)	5.2 (41.4)	3.8 (38.8)	2.1 (35.8)	−3.0 (26.6)	−6.6 (20.1)	−10.7 (12.7)	−13.8 (7.2)
Average precipitation mm (inches)	47.9 (1.89)	36.7 (1.44)	37.6 (1.48)	40.9 (1.61)	48.0 (1.89)	41.1 (1.62)	52.5 (2.07)	44.8 (1.76)	45.5 (1.79)	64.9 (2.56)	57.8 (2.28)	53.8 (2.12)	571.5 (22.51)
Mean monthly sunshine hours	60.0	77.7	113.4	161.5	194.3	198.7	208.7	195.5	151.1	117.9	74.0	48.6	1,601.4
Source: Met Office

== Demography ==
Since 1990 the economy of Gravesham has changed from one based on heavy industry to being service-based. The borough's estimated population in 2012 was 101,700: a 6,000 increase in less than a decade. It has a high population density (almost 10 people per hectare) compared to nationally; it has a relatively young population (40% of the population are below 30); and 60% of the population are of working age.

Based upon figures from the 2021 census, the second largest religious group in the borough are Sikhs who at that time made up 8% of the population. However, if the term belief is used, Christians are most numerous at more than (49%), non-religious (32.1%) and third Sikhs (8%).

== Shopping ==
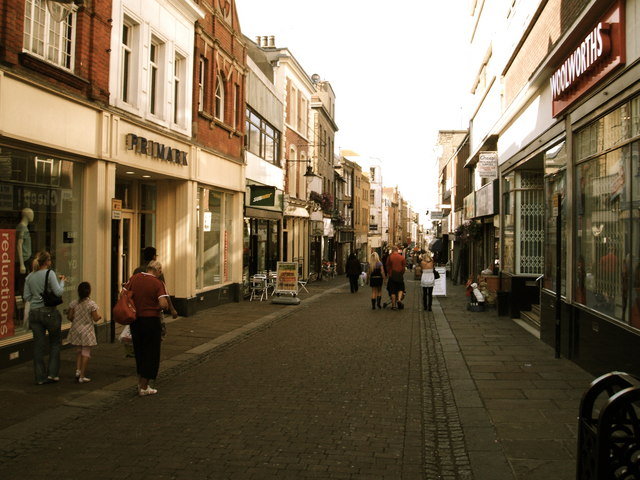
High Street, Gravesend in 2008

Gravesend today is a commercial and commuter town, providing a local shopping district, including the St Georges shopping complex, the Thamesgate shopping centre and a regular farmers' market. Gravesend Market Hall, located in the heart of the town, was first chartered in 1268.

== Landmarks ==
=== Gravesend Town Pier ===
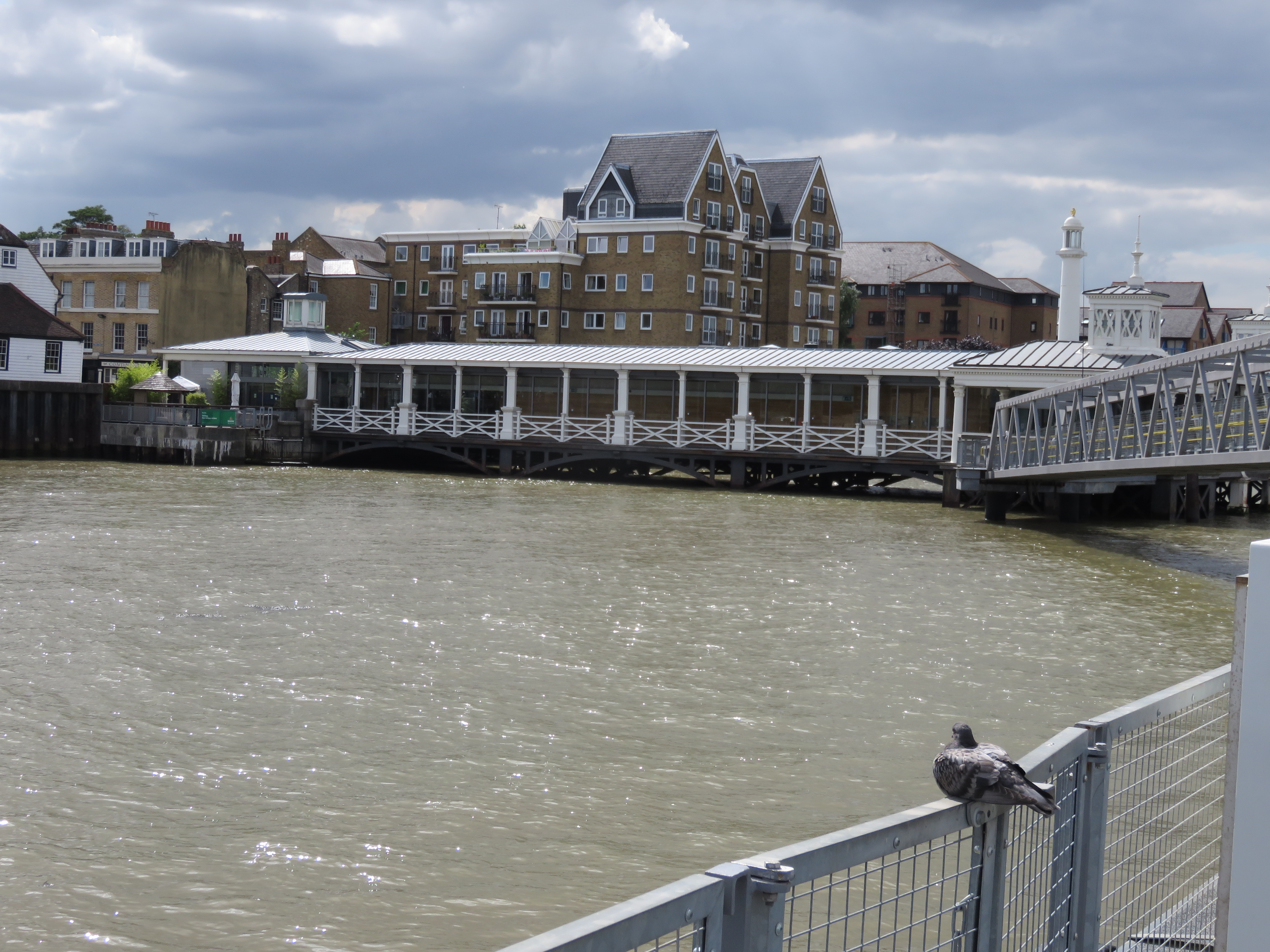
Town Pier Gravesend

Gravesend has the world's oldest surviving cast iron pier, built in 1834. It is a unique structure having the first known iron cylinders used in its construction. The pier was completely refurbished in 2004 and now features a bar and restaurant; with public access to the pier head when the premises are open. A recent £2 million investment in a pontoon is now in place at the pier head onto the Thames, which provides for small and medium-sized craft to land at Gravesend. On 17 September 2012, the Gravesend–Tilbury Ferry, relocated to the Town Pier, from its previous terminal in nearby West Street, though the ferry service was discontinued in the 2020s due to funding issues.

=== Royal Terrace Pier ===
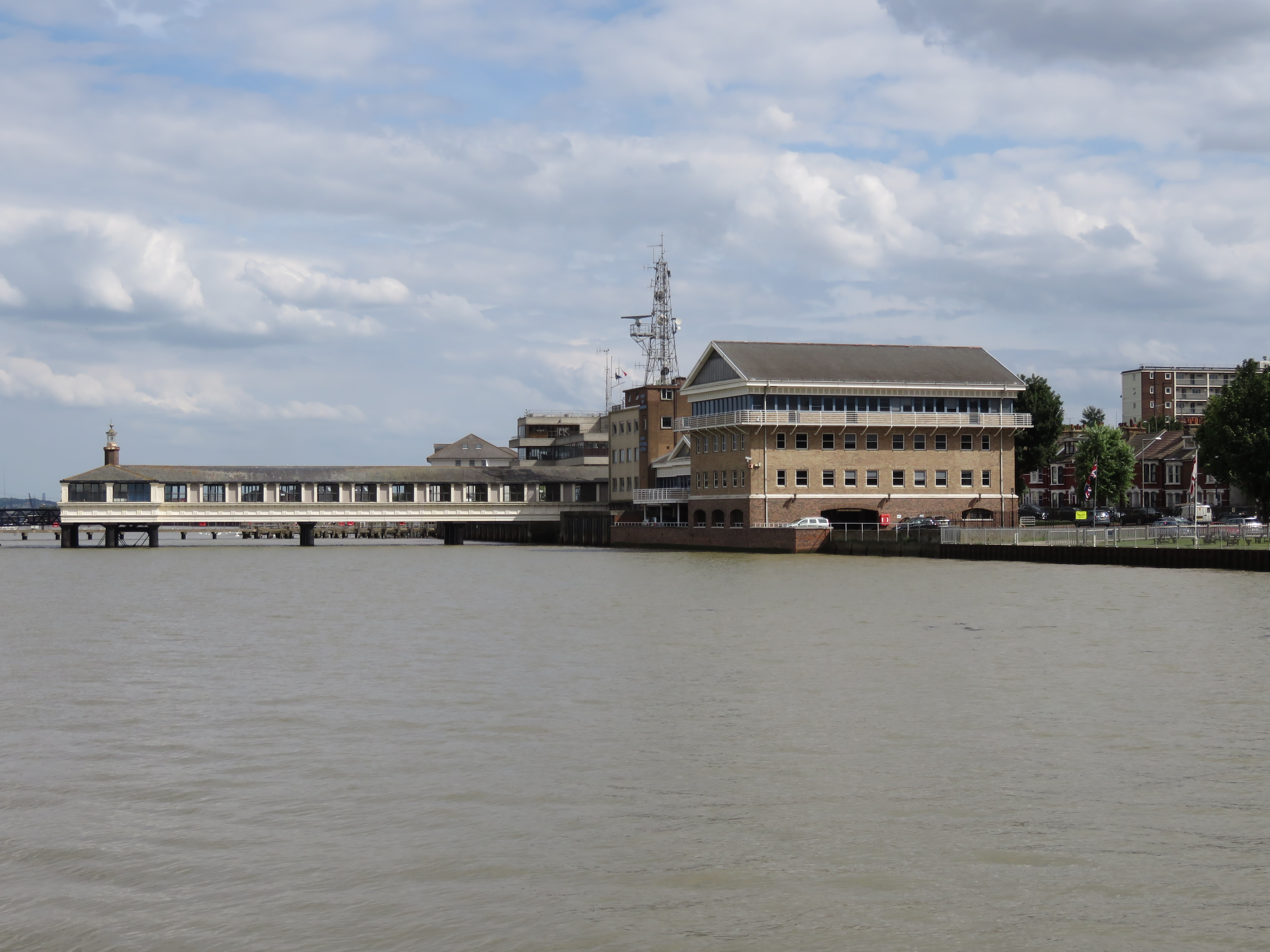
A view of Royal Terrace Pier and London River House Gravesend

Built in 1844, the initial construction was funded by the Gravesend Freehold Investment Company, at a cost of £9,200. It was where Princess Alexandra of Denmark arrived on her way to marry Edward, Prince of Wales (later King Edward VII) in March 1865, and River pilots have been based here since the late 19th century.

Today, Royal Terrace Pier is in constant 24-hour use, as part of the Port of London Authority main operations centre and Gravesend RNLI Lifeboat Station, one of four lifeboat stations situated on the River Thames; thus, its public access is available only occasionally during the year. It is T-shaped, with a pontoon at its pier head. Like the Town Pier, Royal Terrace Pier is also a Grade II listed structure.

=== Gravesend Clock Tower, Milton Road ===
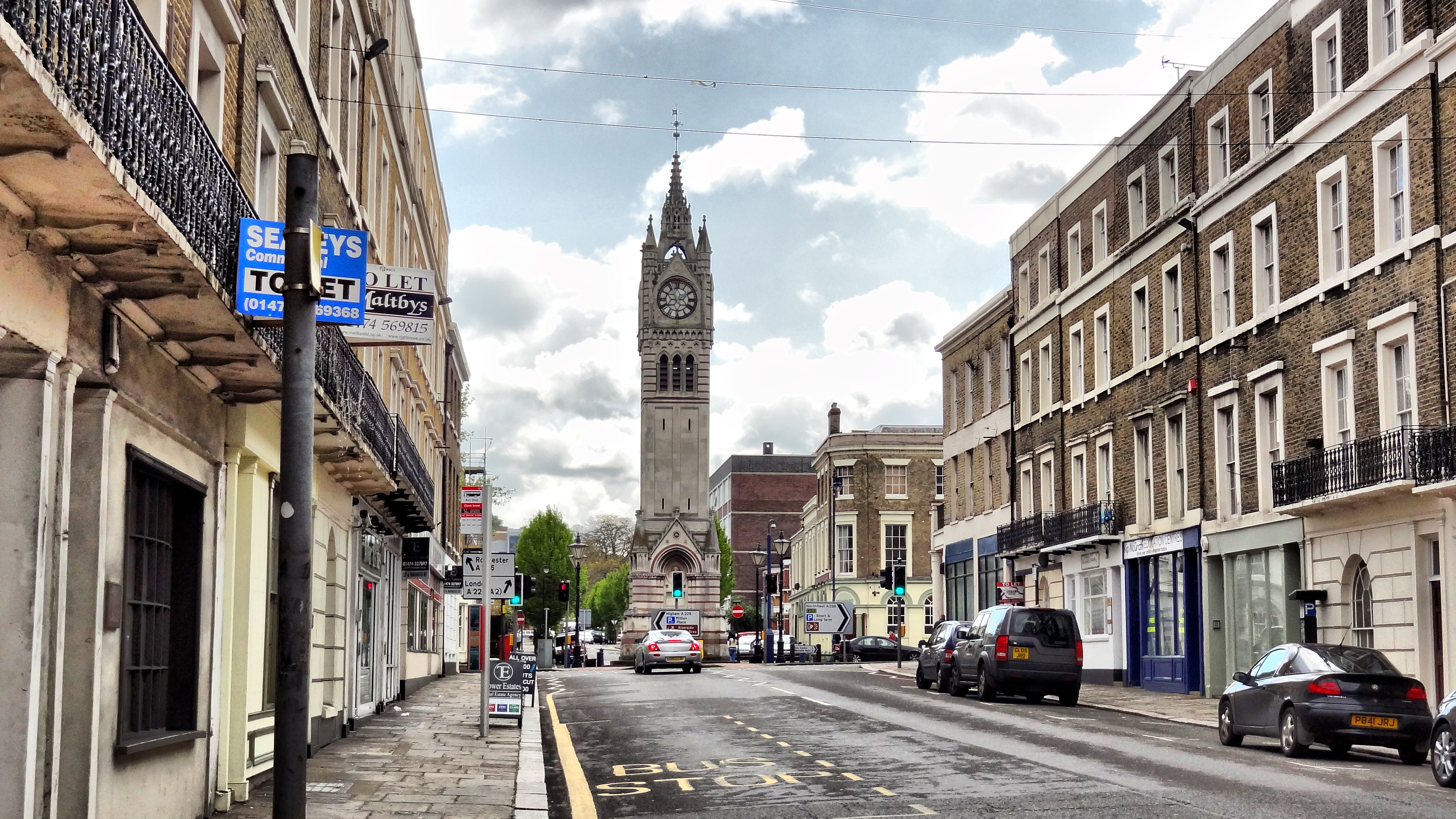
The Clock Tower located at the top of Harmer Street, Gravesend, Kent

Situated at the junction of Milton Road and Harmer Street, its foundation stone was laid on 6 September 1887. The memorial stone records that the clock tower was erected by public subscription (£700 was raised toward its construction) and dedicated to Queen Victoria, to commemorate the 50th year of her reign. Built of Portland and Dumfries stone and backed by London stock brick, the design of the structure is based on the design of the Elizabeth Tower in the Palace of Westminster, which houses Big Ben. The centre of the clock itself is measured at 50 feet (15 m) above ground and the face measures 5 ft 6 in (1.68 m) in diameter. The tower is Grade II listed.

=== Pocahontas statue ===
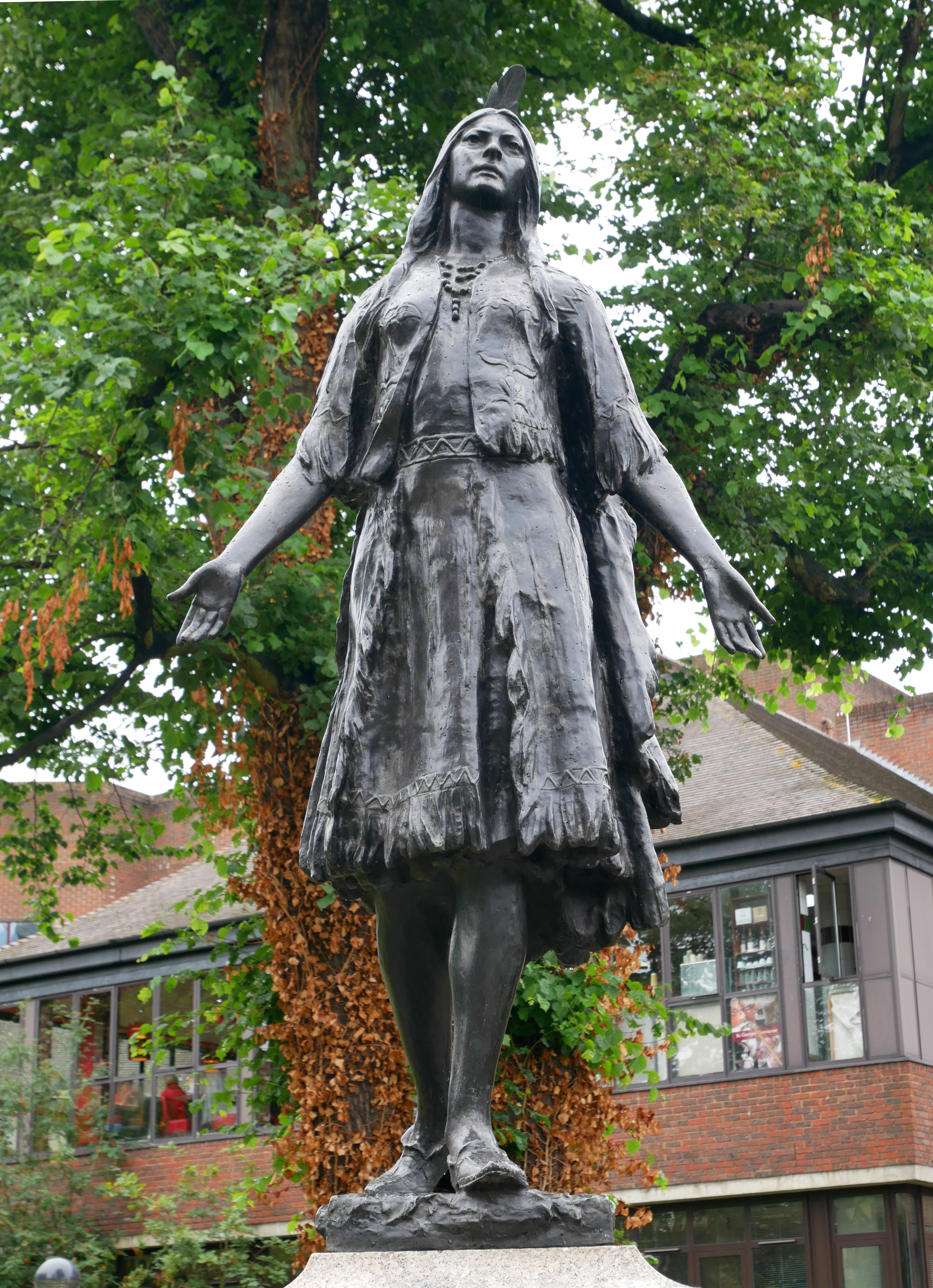
Statue of Pocahontas

An American sculptor, William Ordway Partridge, created a life-size statue of the 17th-century Native American princess Pocahontas, which was unveiled at Jamestown, Virginia in 1922. Queen Elizabeth II viewed this statue in 1957 and again on 4 May 2007, while visiting Jamestown on the 400th anniversary of foundation, it being the first successful English colonial settlement in America.

On 5 October 1958, an exact replica of Partridge's statue was dedicated as a memorial to Pocahontas at St George's Parish Church. The Governor of Virginia presented the statue as a gift to the British people in 1958, a gesture prompted by The Queen's visit to the USA in the previous year.

In 2017, US Ambassador to the United Kingdom Matthew Barzun visited the statue to mark the 400th anniversary of the death and burial of Pocahontas in Gravesend. The Ambassador laid a floral tribute of 21 roses at its base, each symbolising one year of Pocahontas' life.

=== Windmill Hill ===
Windmill Hill, named after its former windmills, offers extensive views across the Thames and was a popular spot for Victorian visitors to the town because of the camera obscura installed at the Old Mill and for its tea gardens and other amusements.

The hill was the site of a beacon in 1377, which was instituted by King Richard II, and still in use 200 years later at the time of the Spanish Armada, although the hill was then known as "Rouge Hill". A modern beacon was erected and lit in 1988, the 400th anniversary of the Armada.

It was during the reign of Queen Elizabeth I that the first windmill was placed at the highest point in Gravesend, 179 ft (55 m) overlooking the high-water mark of the river. One mill burnt down in 1763 but was replaced the following year and that too demolished in 1894. The last surviving windmill is reported as having been destroyed by fire during Mafeking Night celebrations in 1900.

During World War I an Imperial German Navy airship passed over Windmill Hill, dropping bombs on it; today there are three markers indicating where these bombs struck.

=== Gravesend Power Station ===
Gravesend Power Station (TQ 6575 7413) was built by the Gravesend Corporation in 1902–03 to supply local demand for electricity. It was built on the south side of the basin at the west end of the Thames and Medway canal. The buildings were demolished in 1995.

== Gravesend and the River Thames ==
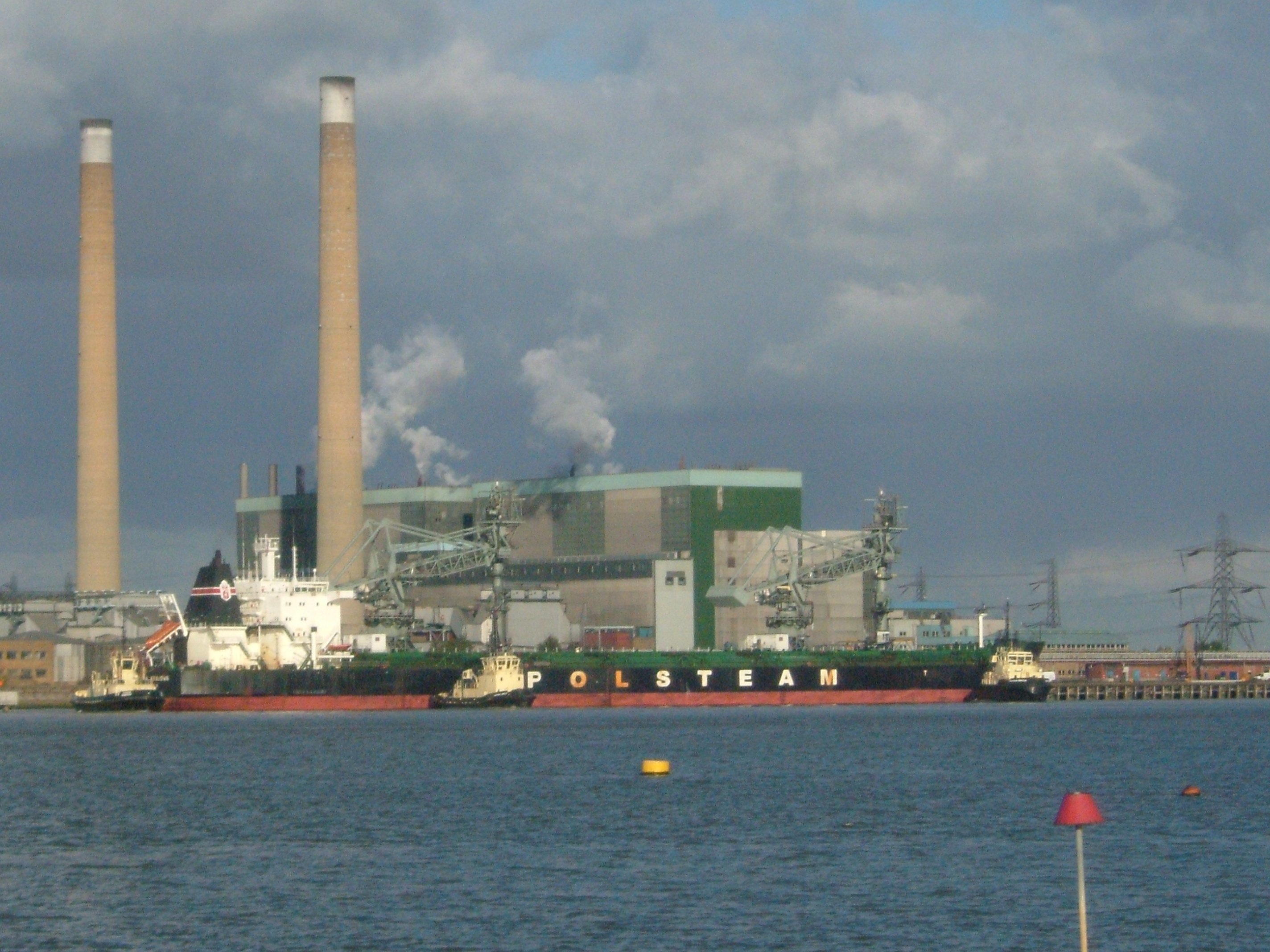
MV Armia Krajowa, a Panamax vessel, being docked by Gravesend tugboats to discharge coal at Tilbury

The Thames has long been an important feature in Gravesend life, and may well have been the deciding factor for the first settlement there. One of the town's first distinctions was in being given the sole right to transport passengers to and from London by water in the late 14th century.

In the 16th century, Catherine of Aragon, the wife of Prince Arthur and later the first wife of Henry VIII, was expected to arrive in England at Gravesend.

The "Tilt Boat" was a familiar sight as it sailed along the Thames, the passengers protected from the weather by a canvas tilt (awning). The first steamboat plied its trade between Gravesend and London in the early 19th century, bringing with it a steadily increasing number of visitors to the Terrace Pier Gardens, Windmill Hill, Springhead Gardens and Rosherville Gardens. Gravesend soon became one of the first English resort towns and thrived from an early tourist trade.

Gravesend "watermen" were often in a family trade; and the town is the headquarters of the Port of London Authority Control Centre (formerly known as Thames Navigation Service), has its headquarters at Gravesend, providing maritime pilots who play an important role in navigation on the River Thames.

A dinghy at an unmodernised Gravesend was the backdrop to the 1952 thriller The Long Memory starring Sir John Mills. In the film, Mills plays a character living in poverty on a derelict fishing boat stranded in the mud flats.

Gravesend has one of England's oldest regattas retained from its strong maritime links with the Thames. Although the origins of the regatta are unknown it dates back at least to Tudor times. The races are traditionally competed by Gravesend skiffs, 21-foot-long (6.4 m) oaken round-bottomed, clinker-built boats.

The Thames Navigation Service was first thought up between 1950 and 1952 by Cdr Peter de Neumann, while he was captain of HM Customs and Excise cutter Vigilant based at Gravesend Reach. This idea followed from considering such incidents as the accidental ramming of HMS Truculent by the Divina in 1950, the collision with the Nore Forts by Baalbek, and the disastrous flooding of Canvey, Foulness and the East Coast in 1953. In these and other situations, rescue and intelligence gathering were severely hampered by a lack of centralised command and control, and lack of a detailed "picture". De Neumann resigned his command after returning Vigilant from the Spithead Review and joined the PLA, immediately suggesting, in a report to them submitted in 1953, that a feasibility study of such a system be carried out. He then oversaw its development and ultimate installation at Gravesend.

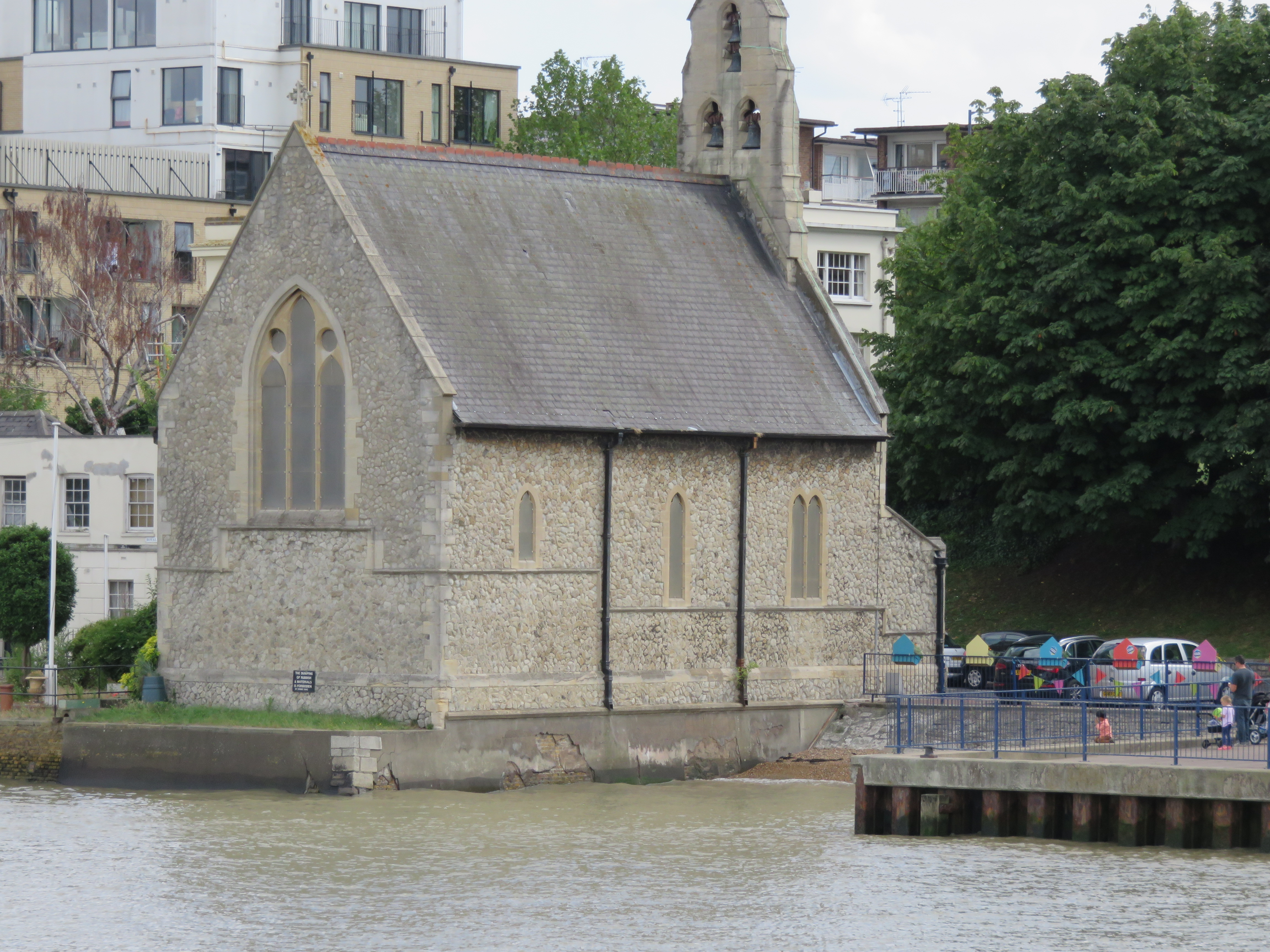
St Andrew's Art Centre & Gallery sits between Bawley Bay and Anchor Cove, both being the embarkation points for British colonists sailing to New Zealand and Australia in the early 19th century.

Until the building of Tilbury Docks, on the opposite side of the river, between 1882 and 1886, Gravesend was the Thames's first port of entry. Thousands of emigrants, as well as large numbers of troops, embarked from here. Tilbury Docks have expanded considerably since, with the closure of all the London Docks. The entrance to the Docks is somewhat awkward, situated as it is on the sharp bend of the river, and boats often need tugboat assistance, as do the larger ships moored at Tilbury landing stages. There have been many tug companies based at Gravesend: among them the Sun Company, the Alexandra Towing Company and, today, the Smith Howard Towing Company. East Indiamen traditionally stopped here at a point known as Long Reach to lighten their loads before sailing up the Thames to moorings at Blackwall.

For some years after, war steamer excursions were run on the MV Royal Daffodil down the Thames from Gravesend to France, but they ceased in 1966. Cruises are now operated by the Lower Thames and Medway Passenger Boat Company up the river to Greenwich. The cross-river passenger ferry to Tilbury provides a long-established route to and from Essex. Before the Dartford Crossing came into being, there was a vehicle ferry at Gravesend as well.

There is a RNLI lifeboat station, based at Royal Terrace Pier, which is one of the busiest in the country.

=== Thames and Medway Canal ===
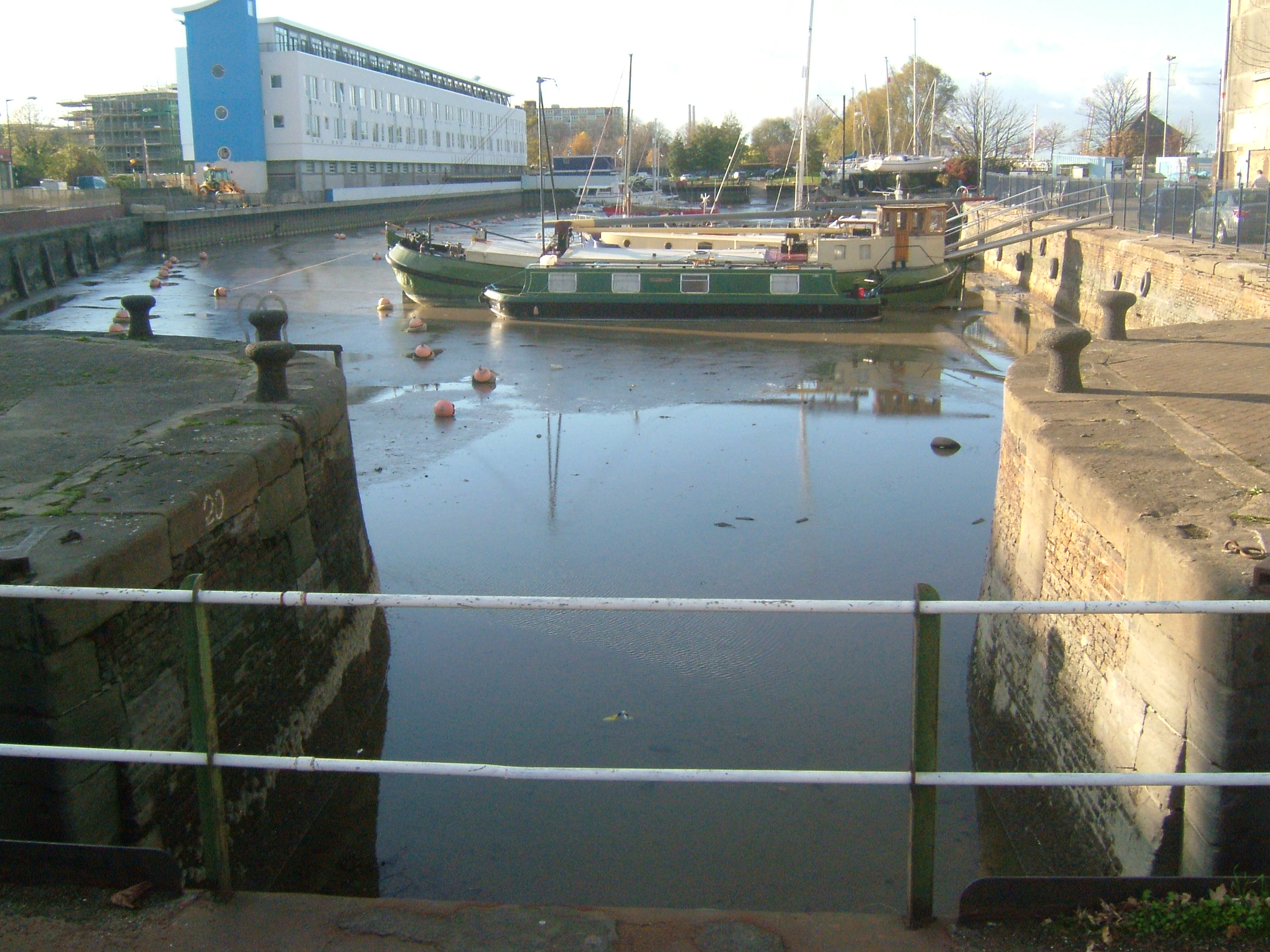
Gravesend Canal Basin

The Thames and Medway Canal was opened for barge traffic in 1824. It ran from Gravesend on the Thames to Frindsbury near Strood on the Medway. Although seven miles long, it had only two locks, each 94 ft (29 m) by 22 ft (6.7 m) in size, one at each end. Its most notable feature was the tunnel near Strood, which was 3,946 yd (3,608 m) long, the second longest canal tunnel ever built in the UK. The great cost of the tunnel meant that the canal was not a commercial success.

After only 20 years, most of the canal was closed and the canal's tunnel was converted to railway use. Initially, canal and railway shared the tunnel, with the single track built on timber supports, but by 1847, canal use was abandoned and a double track laid. Today the Gravesend Canal Basin is used for the mooring of pleasure craft. Gravesend Sailing Club, which was founded so that working men could participate in the sport while still having to earn a living is based here. The lock has been dredged, and restoration and strengthening work has been carried out on the basin walls as part of the regeneration of the area.

== Transport ==
=== Roads ===
The main roads through the town are the west–east A226 road from Dartford and beyond to Rochester; and the A227 road to Tonbridge. The A2 road passes two miles (3 km) south of Gravesend town centre; a mile stretch of it was rerouted in the early 2000s to take the traffic away from the south end of the town.

On 26 March 2006 the first of the area's new Fastrack bus services, which use a combination of ordinary roads and dedicated 'bus tracks', opened. The service links to Ebbsfleet International railway station, Greenhithe, Bluewater Shopping Centre and Dartford.

=== Rail ===
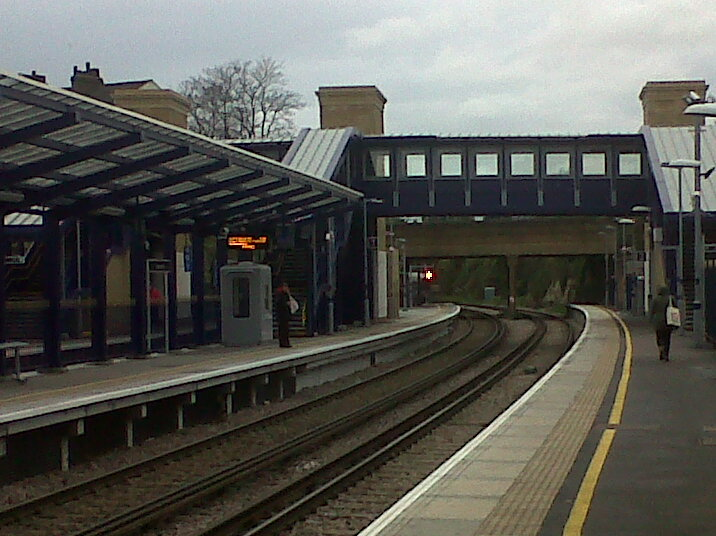
Gravesend's Victorian railway station modernised for HS1 in 2014

The historic Gravesend Railway Station, opened in 1849, lies on the North Kent Line. The Gravesend West Line, terminating by the river and for some time operating as a continental ferry connection, closed in 1968.

Gravesend is the primary north Kent interchange for high speed and metro rail services. In December 2009, the full high-speed timetable between London and Kent came into force and passenger usage from Gravesend has exceeded expectations. High-speed services from London St Pancras and Stratford International, are offered via Gravesend to the Medway towns, Sittingbourne, Faversham, Margate, Broadstairs and Ramsgate. Some of these services continue to Ashford International via Sandwich and Dover Priory.

There are also metro services to London Charing Cross, London Waterloo East and London Bridge via Sidcup, via Woolwich Arsenal and Lewisham and Bexleyheath, and to Gillingham.

Unusually Gravesend features a Platform 0, one of the few in the country, it is used for terminating services from London Cannon Street or London Charing Cross via Sidcup.

=== Buses ===
Gravesend is served by several Arriva Kent Thameside bus services connecting the town with other areas in Kent including Dartford, Bluewater and Sevenoaks and to the Medway Towns.
Gravesend is also served by Fastrack bus services connecting the town with Bluewater, Darent Valley Hospital and Dartford.

=== Ferry ===
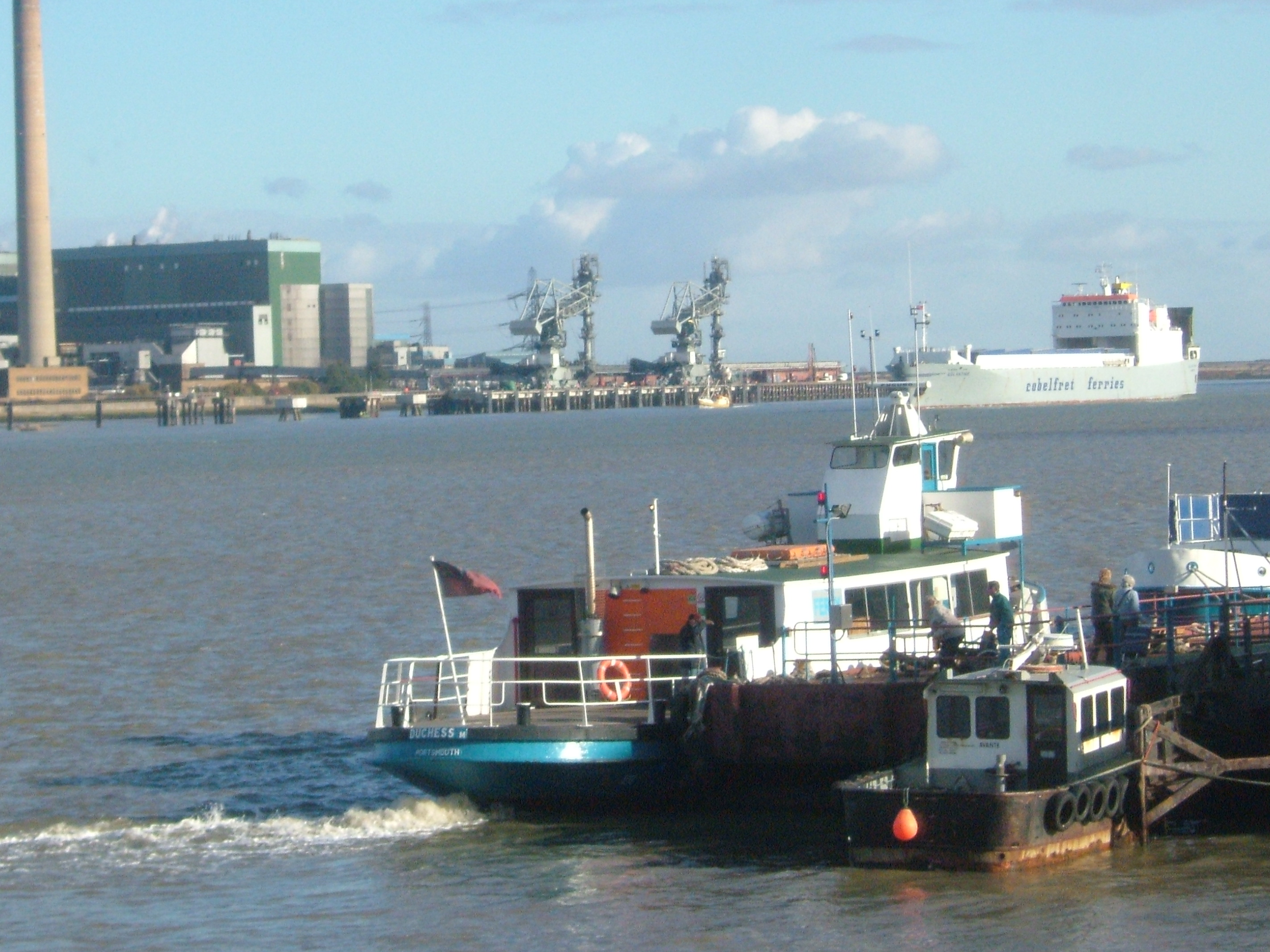
The ferry from Tilbury coming alongside at Gravesend

Passenger ferry services to Tilbury, Essex, operated daily (except Sundays), from Gravesend Town Pier until 31 March 2024.

=== Footpaths ===
The Saxon Shore Way, a long distance footpath, starts at Gravesend and traces the coast as in Roman times as far as Hastings, East Sussex; 163 miles (262 km) in total. The Wealdway also starts at the Town Pier, and continues almost due south over the Weald to Eastbourne in East Sussex where it links with South Downs Way, a distance of 80 miles (128 km).

== Religious Buildings ==
The town's principal Anglican place of worship is the Church of St George, Gravesend. This Georgian building is a tourist attraction because of its association with Princess Pocahontas, as well as being the parish church. Gravesend has three other Church of England parishes and Roman Catholic, Methodist, United Reformed and Baptist churches as well as other smaller chapels.

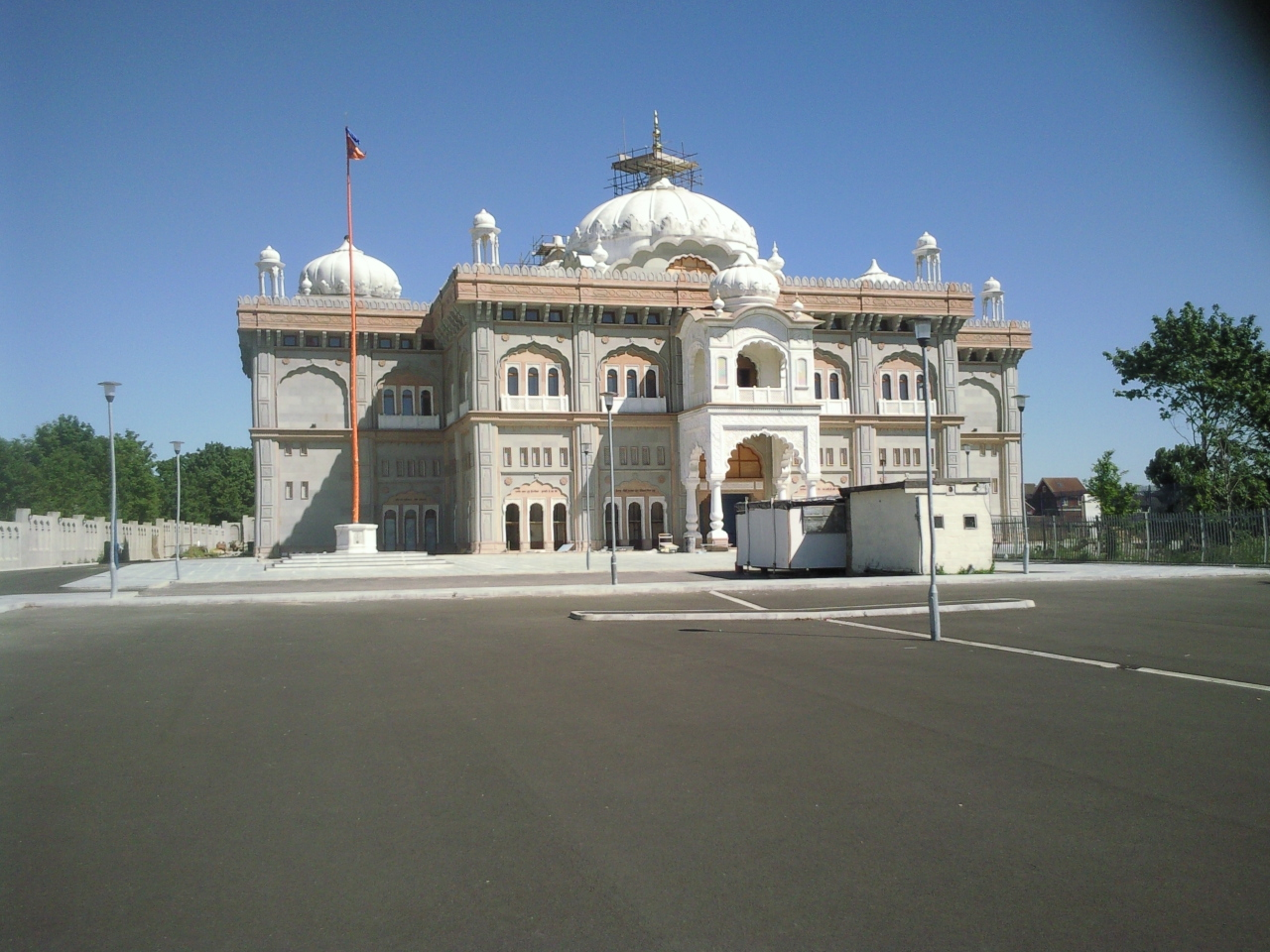
Guru Nanak Darbar Gurdwara, Gravesend

Gravesend has a significant Sikh population of more than 15,000, representing over 15% of the town's population. Its first gurdwara was founded in 1956 by Bhat Sikh Santokh Singh Takk in Edwin Street with a second one opening, ten years later, in a former Congregationalist church, but this gurdwara closed in 2010. The same year, one of Europe's largest Sikh temples was opened at a cost of £12 million.

== Education ==
Gravesend many schools include Northfleet School for Girls; Northfleet Technology College (Northfleet School for Boys, on the former sites of Northfleet Secondary School for Boys and Gravesend Technical High School for Boys); Mayfield Grammar School (formerly Gravesend Grammar School for Girls); St John's Catholic Comprehensive School; Thamesview School and St George's Church of England School. Gravesend also hosts Gravesend Grammar School, a, consistently high-achieving grammar school and sixth form where 50% of students gained a Grade 7 (Grade A equivalent) or above in 2025. There are also primary age schools such as Whitehill Primary School, special schools and several independent schools, such as Bronte School and St Joseph's. Finally, the town is also host to an Adult Education Centre.

== Health & Hospice ==
Gravesend Hospital was opened in 1854, following the donation of a site by the 6th Earl of Darnley in 1853; it had its origin on 2 December 1850, as a dispensary on the Milton Road "to assist the really destitute poor of Gravesend and Milton and vicinities ... unable to pay for medical aid". By 1893, 4,699 such people had benefited by its presence.

In 2004 the original building, and parts of the newer buildings were demolished to make way for a new community hospital. Gravesend Community Hospital provides a Minor Injury Unit, Dental services, Speech and Language therapy and Physiotherapy. It also has a Stroke Ward and offers inpatient care. The outpatient department provides care for much of the local area and is separate from those offered at Darent Valley Hospital. In addition, Gravesend emergency doctors out of hours service as well as podiatry are offered.

In the town centre is a medium-sized medical clinic at Swan Yard, next to the Market car park. The medical clinic is only suitable for minor injuries, for major injuries and more severe or specialist appointments, a trip to Darent Valley Hospital is required. Several other doctors' surgeries are located in the area.

== Sport ==
=== Football ===
The Stonebridge Road football ground at neighbouring Northfleet is home to Ebbsfleet United F.C., which changed its name from Gravesend and Northfleet F.C. in June 2007. Ebbsfleet currently plays in the National League South, and the club won the FA Trophy in May 2008. An agreement was reached for the MyFootballClub online community to purchase a 75% stake in the club in November 2007, and its takeover was completed early in 2008.

Punjab United plays at the Steve Cook Stadium (Elite Venue), who are a Sikh Community club founded in 2003. They compete in the Isthmian League South East, after gaining promotion in 2026, from the Southern Counties East Football League.

=== Cricket ===
Gravesend Cricket Club (founded in 1881 when the Harkaway and Clarence Cricket Clubs amalgamated) is based at the Bat and Ball Ground on Wrotham Road, where cricket has been played since its foundation at the behest of the 6th Earl of Darnley (grandfather of the celebrated England cricketer, The Hon. Ivo Bligh, later 8th Earl of Darnley) in the mid 19th century.

=== Rugby Union ===
Gravesend has two rugby union teams, Gravesend Rugby Football Club and Old Gravesendians RFC, which are situated next to each other opposite the Gravesend Grammar School.

Old Gravesendians RFC (founded in 1929) consisted traditionally of former Gravesend Grammar School pupils. Prior to the forming of Old Gravesendians RFC, on leaving the Grammar School, former pupils had continued to engage in various sports through the Old Blues Association (founded in 1914). Owing to World War I the Old Blues Association practically went to pieces with only one annual dinner having been held in 1914. After the war a reunion dinner was held in 1920, the second annual dinner, which restarted the Old Blues Association activities. The Old Gravesendians RFC was often referred to as 'Gravesend Old Blues' in match reports.

Old Gravesendians RFC continued to foster rugby in Gravesend during World War II by turning out a side every season. Since 2000 Old Gravesendians (Old G's) have reached six Kent Plate finals, winning two. They achieved promotion to London League rugby in 2009, but were relegated in 2009–10. Old G's put out three sides with the first team playing in Shepherd Neame Kent 1 during the 2018–19 season. The team colours are light blue and dark blue.

=== Rowing ===
Rowing races have been held on the River Thames at Gravesend since at least 1698, with the first organised Regatta recorded in 1715. The first Borough Regatta began in 1882, setting the pattern for an annual event on the River Thames that is carried on to this day. The River Thames in Gravesend is home to the Gravesend Rowing Club (founded in 1878), which the club claims is the oldest existing sporting club in Gravesend, the Regatta Committee's skiff rowers, and Gravesend Sailing Club. Gravesend Grammar School also hosts its own Rowing Club.

=== Cycling ===
To the south of Gravesend on the ancient site of Watling Street on 43ha of land adjacent to the A2, Cyclopark, a venue for cycling events and other activities has been developed. The site which features mountain bike trails, a road circuit, a BMX racetrack and family cycling paths was formally opened in early 2012.

== Culture ==
The Gravesend Historical Society meets regularly and produces a biannual magazine on its activities.

Charles Dickens lived at Gad's Hill Place, 2 miles (3.2 km) east of Gravesend and specifically mentions the town and its environs in at least three of his novels. In David Copperfield Mr. Peggotty, Ham and the Micawbers say their goodbyes and sail away from Gravesend to begin a new life in Australia. In Great Expectations, Pip, with accomplices, rows Magwitch from London downriver in expectation of waylaying a regular steamer (whilst under way in the Lower Hope, off Gravesend) bound for Hamburg. At St James' Church, in Cooling, Pip finds Magwitch hidden among the graves. Gravesend also appears in The Pickwick Papers by Charles Dickens.

In the 1902 novel Heart of Darkness by Joseph Conrad, Charles Marlow's ship, anchored off Gravesend, is the setting where he tells his tale.

The 1952 film "The Long Memory" starring John Mills was filmed in and around Gravesend.

The War Game was a 1965 BBC television drama-documentary film depicting a nuclear war that was initially banned, and not broadcast until July 1985. The film was shot in Gravesend and in the other Kent towns of Tonbridge, Chatham and Dover, with a cast which was almost entirely made up of non-actors.

== Notable people ==
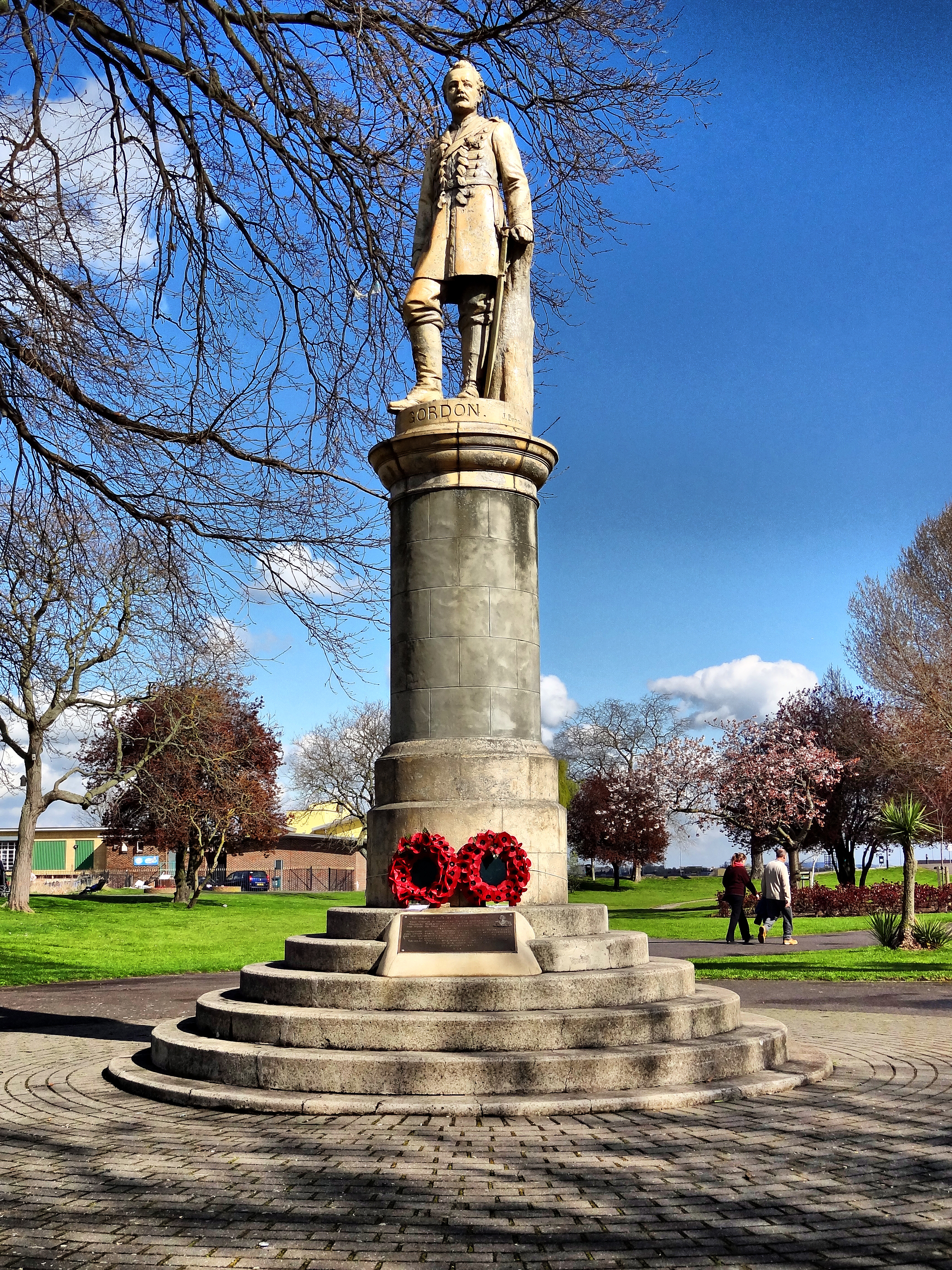
Statue of General Gordon at Gravesend

- Sir Edwin Arnold (1832–1904), English poet and journalist whose most prominent work as a poet was The Light of Asia (1879).
- Gemma Arterton (born 1986), actress, was born at Northfleet and attended Gravesend Grammar School for Girls.
- Sir Derek Barton (1918–1998), English chemist and Nobel Prize winner for "contributions to the development of the concept of conformation and its application in chemistry".
- Admiral Sir Francis Beaufort (1774–1857), creator of the Beaufort Scale, was stationed at Gravesend.
- Sir Peter Blake (born 1932), artist who trained at Gravesend School of Art. The Blake Gallery has recently been opened at the Woodville Halls in the town.
- George Box (1919–2013), renowned statistician, and a recipient of the FRS.
- Laura Coombs (born 1991), footballer for England.
- Charles Dickens is associated with Gravesend and villages around the borough. Many of the links between him and Gravesham are still in evidence – Gravesend he visited, at Chalk he spent his honeymoon, at Higham he lived and died, and at Cobham he found inspiration for The Pickwick Papers.
- Jessica Dismorr (1885-1939), a member of the Vorticism art movement, was born in Gravesend.
- Carl Daniel Ekman (1845–1904) Swedish chemist and paper-maker who relocated to Gravesend.
- Major-General Charles Gordon (1833–1885), lived in the town from 1865 to 1871. As commander of the Royal Engineers, he supervised the construction of the forts guarding the Thames downstream from Gravesend, at New Tavern Fort in the town, Shornemead Fort on the Thames's south bank, and Coalhouse Fort on the north in Essex. While in Gravesend, Gordon devoted himself to the welfare of the town's "poor boys", establishing a Sunday School and providing food and clothes for them from his Army wages. His links with Gravesend are commemorated locally on the embankment at the Riverside Leisure Area, which is known as the Gordon Promenade, and at Khartoum Place that lies just to the south.
- Paul Greengrass (born 1955) film director was educated at Gravesend Grammar School for Boys.
- Marc Guehi (born 2000), English professional footballer for Crystal Palace F.C., was educated at St George's Church of England School, in Gravesend.
- Thom Gunn (1929–2004), Anglo-American poet, was born in Gravesend. His most famous collection, The Man With Night Sweats (1992), is dominated by AIDS-related elegies. He relocated to San Francisco, California in 1954 to teach writing at Stanford University and remain close to Mike his partner whom he met whilst at university.
- Katharine Hamnett (born 1947), fashion designer.
- William Hanneford-Smith (1878–1954) publisher
- Adam Holloway (born 1965), former Member of Parliament (MP) 2005-2024, lives on Darnley Road in the town.
- Frederick Holbourn (1896-1967), war pensioner activist
- Mary Lucas Keene (1885–1977), professor of anatomy
- Shadrach Jones (c.1822–1895) New Zealand doctor, auctioneer, hotel-owner and impresario; born in Gravesend.
- Joshua Laqeretabua (born 2005), Fijian professional footballer for Charlton Athletic F.C. and Fiji national under-20 football team, was educated at St George's Church of England School, in Gravesend.
- John MacGregor (1825–1892), English writer, who designed the "Rob Roy" canoe.
- Toni Mount (fl. 2026), historian and writer
- Mitch Pinnock (born 1994), English professional footballer, was born in the town. He currently plays for Northampton Town.
- Pocahontas (1595–1617), the first Native American girl or woman to visit England. She was taken ill on her return voyage to America, and died aged 21 after coming ashore at Gravesend. She was buried under the chancel of St George's parish church.
- Harry Reid (born 1992), actor who appeared in EastEnders as Ben Mitchell, was born and lives in Gravesend. He attended Northfleet Technology College (formerly known as Northfleet School for Boys). Trained in acting, physical theatre and musical theatre at Miskin Theatre in Dartford, Kent.
- The composer Nikolai Rimsky-Korsakov (1844–1908) was an officer in the Russian Navy and was posted to Gravesend in 1862, where he wrote part of his first symphony, said to be the first such style of composition attempted by a Russian composer.
- Paul Ritter (1966-2021), actor best known for Friday Night Dinner, Chernobyl and Harry Potter and the Half-Blood Prince
- David Rutley (born 1961 at Gravesend), first Mormon UK Member of Parliament (MP).
- Chris Simmons (born 1975 at Gravesend), television and stage actor best known for his roles as DC Mickey Webb in The Bill, Mark Garland in EastEnders and Stuart Summer in Hollyoaks.
- Charles Stewart, 3rd Duke of Richmond, resided at Cobham Hall, 5 miles (8 km) south east of Gravesend, until 1672 (followed by his descendants, the Earls of Darnley).
- Olamide Sodeke (born 2005) English professional rugby player for Saracens, was educated at Gravesend Grammar School
- Fikayo Tomori (born 1997) English professional footballer for AC Milan, was educated at Gravesend Grammar School

== Twin towns ==
Gravesend is twinned with:

- Cambrai, France
- Chesterfield, Virginia, United States
- Neumünster, Germany
- Brunswick, Victoria, Australia

== See also ==
- Gravesham (UK Parliament constituency)
- List of Battle of Britain airfields
- Tollgate Hotel
