= Holbourn =

Holbourn is a surname. Notable people with the surname include:

- Frederick Holbourn (1896–1967), war pensioner and activist
- Ian Holbourn (1872–1935), academic and laird of Foula
