= Shadrach Jones =

Shadrach Jones

Shadrach Edward Robert Jones (c. 1822 – 12 July 1895) was a New Zealand doctor, auctioneer, hotel-owner and impresario.

Jones was born in Gravesend, Kent, England in circa 1822. He graduated MD from St Andrews University in Scotland in 1844 and then practised medicine in Shropshire.

Jones emigrated to the Australian gold diggings and by 1854 was an auctioneer in Bendigo (then called Sandhurst). In 1861 he came to New Zealand to join the Otago gold rush buying the Commercial Hotel and leasing the Provincial Hotel in Dunedin. He was well known in the hospitality business in Dunedin where he also leased land at Andersons Bay to establish the Vauxhall Gardens. In 1863 he engaged the All England Eleven cricket team to come to New Zealand and play matches in Dunedin and Christchurch, but the tour was a financial failure. He also brought Lysters' Opera Company from Australia to Dunedin to perform Italian operas. His residence became the Red Cross Montecillo Home.

He left New Zealand in the mid-1860s returning in 1882 leaving his wife and family in England. He practised medicine, and was the public vaccinator, in Tapanui from 1883 to 1887. He then went to Sydney with his nephew Harwood where he continued to practise medicine.

He died in Raymond Terrace, New South Wales on 12 July 1895.
