= St John's Catholic Comprehensive School =

Location
- Rochester Road; Gravesend, Kent, DA12 2JW; England; 51.4333°N 0.3857°E

Information
- Type: Voluntary aided school
- Religious affiliation: Roman Catholic
- Founded: c. 1858
- Local authority: Kent County Council
- Department for Education URN: 118933 Tables
- Ofsted: Reports
- Headteacher: Matthew Barron
- Gender: Coeducational
- Age: 11 to 18
- Enrolment: 1,264 as of December 2022
- Houses: Patrick, Ambrose & Clare
- Colours: Green, Blue & Purple
- Website: http://www.stjohnscs.com/

St John's Catholic Comprehensive School is a coeducational Roman Catholic secondary school and sixth form, located in Gravesend in the English county of Kent.

It is a voluntary aided school in the trusteeship of the Roman Catholic Archdiocese of Southwark, and is maintained by Kent County Council. Although the school has its own admissions procedure, it does coordinate with Kent County Council for admissions.

St John's Catholic Comprehensive School offers GCSEs, BTECs and OCR Nationals as programmes of study for pupils, while students in the sixth form have the option to study from a range of A Levels and further BTECs.

== Selection ==
Kent is a selective county, which means children at eleven must select whether to put themselves forward to take a competitive test.

== Description ==
St John's Catholic Comprehensive is an 11 to 18 school in the Archdiocese of Southwark. It is larger than the average-sized secondary school. The executive headteacher and head of school have been appointed since 2012. The executive headteacher is the headteacher of an above average school in the Archdiocese of Southwark.

About half the students are from White British backgrounds and the rest of the students come from a wide variety of minority ethnic groups, including Indian and Black African. The proportion of students who speak English as an additional language is significantly above the national average and the proportion of students eligible for the pupil premium (additional funding for students eligible for free school meals and those in the care of the local authority) is just above the national average. There were 54 students eligible for Year 7 catch-up funding in 2014: students who did not achieve Level 4 (the nationally expected level) in English and mathematics at the end of Key Stage 2. The proportion of disabled students and those who have special educational needs is one-tenth of the school roll, which is just above the national average. The school holds the British Council International School Award.

== Buildings ==
To the left of the three-storey high central atrium, known as the heart, are three identical teaching blocks. To the right are the gyms, dance studios, changing rooms, DT rooms music and art.

== Curriculum ==
Virtually all maintained schools and academies follow the National Curriculum, and are inspected by Ofsted on how well they succeed in delivering a 'broad and balanced curriculum'. The school has to decide whether Key Stage 3 contains years 7, 8 and 9- or whether year 9 should be in Key Stage 4 and the students just studying subjects that will be examined by the GCSE exams at 16. St John's makes year 9 a transition year where students opt for some of the subjects on which they will be examined in year 11.

Year 7 students, coming from the primary sector, all do core subjects. Year 8 is similar. In Year 9 students study seven Core subjects including Religion and Double English. They choose one EBACC subject (that means History, Geography or Spanish) they then choose two Key Stage 4 Options that they can continue with through to 16, and two Key Stage 3 Options that are one-year un-certificated courses.

In Year 10, they select two more Key Stage 4 options making four in all, They continue Core subjects and EBacc. In Year Eleven, most students will continue with Core and EBacc but drop 2 of their 4 Key Stage 4 Options. It is these subjects on which they will be tested.
