= Thamesview School =

Location
- Thong Lane; Gravesend, Kent, DA12 4LF; England; 51.4235°N 0.3968°E

Information
- Type: Foundation high school
- Local authority: Kent
- Department for Education URN: 118879 Tables
- Ofsted: Reports
- Headteacher: George Rorke
- Gender: Coeducational
- Age: 11 to 18
- Website: http://www.thamesviewsch.co.uk/

Thamesview School is a coeducational foundation high school and sixth form, located in Gravesend in the English county of Kent.

It is administered by Kent County Council, which coordinates admissions to the school. Thamesview School has a non-selective intake, but does have specialisms in Business and Enterprise. Originally opened in 1968, under former Gordon School Headteacher Robert H. Dent Bsc Econ (retired 1981) to provide secondary education to children living in the rapidly expanding developments to the east of Gravesend (most notably Riverview Park), following a Government rebuilding programme, the school moved into a new building in September 2010, and a purpose-built vocational centre opened in 2005.

Thamesview School offers GCSEs and BTECs as programmes of study for pupils. the school also operates a vocational sixth form where students have the option to study from a range of further BTECs and additional vocational courses.
