= Transport in Kent =

Transportation needs within the county of Kent in South East England has been served by both historical and current transport systems.

== Roads ==
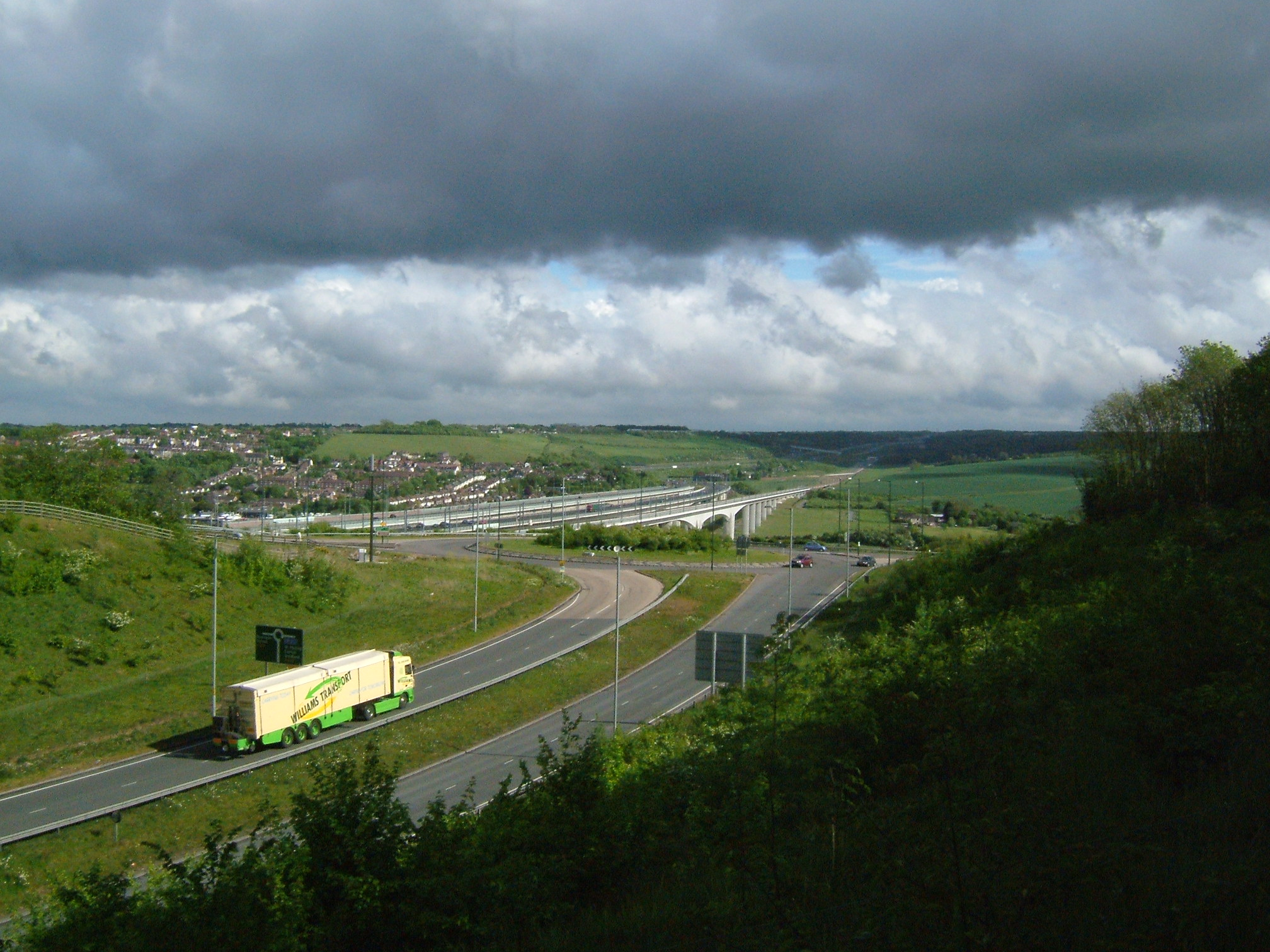
The M2 and High Speed 1 crossing the Medway Valley, south of Rochester

The earliest footpaths and roads in Kent ran in a north-east/south-west direction. They followed the natural contours of the land and took advantage of the gaps in the Downs and Weald created by streams and rivers. Some of these paths and tracks have over time have been widened and metalled but rarely straightened. With the Roman invasion a road network was constructed to contact London to the Channel Ports of Dover, Lympne and Richborough. The London-Dover road was part of Watling Street. These routes are now approximately followed by the A2, B2068, A257, and the A28. When the roads were turnpiked in the 18th century, they were used to carry foodstuffs from Kent to London, and the roads radiated from there. The A2 ran from London to Dartford (A207), Gravesend, Rochester, Canterbury and Dover. The A20 ran to Eltham, Wrotham, Maidstone, Charing, Ashford, Hythe, Folkestone and Dover. The A21 ran to Sevenoaks, Tonbridge, and Tunbridge Wells. With the increased traffic on these roads, the main towns were bypassed; and then in the 1960s two motorways were built: the M2 from Medway to Faversham, and the M20 from Swanley to Folkestone. Part of the M25 runs through Kent, from Westerham to the Kent and Essex tunnel at Dartford. Even these roads have failed to provide adequate capacity, and are upgraded and widened from time to time. The Dartford Tunnel was supplemented by the Queen Elizabeth II Bridge, allowing four lanes in each direction. This is a toll crossing.

== Water ==
The rivers, canals, and ports of Kent

The Cinque Ports were important mediaeval ports. They were Sandwich, Dover, Hythe, Romney and Hastings, and later Rye and Winchelsea. All of these have silted up, with the exception of Dover which is a busy RORO ferry port. Ramsgate is a container port. The Medway Estuary has been an important port and naval base for 500 years. The River Medway is tidal up to Allington and navigable up to Tonbridge. There are two canals in Kent, the Royal Military Canal between Hythe and Rye, which is still extant, and the Thames and Medway Canal between Strood and Gravesend. Built in 1824, it was bought up by the railways in 1846 and backfilled.

The Port of Dover is the major port.

== Railways ==
Railways in Kent

The earliest locomotive driven, passenger carrying railway in Britain was the Canterbury and Whitstable Railway which opened in 1830. This and the London and Greenwich Railway merged into South Eastern Railways (SER) which built the first mainline though Kent with the explicit aim to connect the Kent coast ports with the capital. Hampered by unusual parliamentary restraint the line took the indirect route of sharing the LBSCR's main line until Redhill, Surrey, then travelling along the length of Kent via Tonbridge to reach the ports of Folkestone and Dover via the new "railway" town of Ashford - completed in 1844. SER's networks soon expanded with the North Kent Line along the North Kent coast from London to Dartford, Gravesend and Strood, before following the Medway Valley (as the Medway Valley Line in 1844–56). Branches off this network gave SER access to Thanet from Ashford via Canterbury (1846), Hastings via the Romney Marsh (1852)and Hastings via Tunbridge Wells (1845–52). SER's major London termini were London Bridge, Charing Cross, and Cannon Street.

Kent also had a second major railway, the London, Chatham and Dover Railway (LCDR) which competed extensively with the SER, leading to many Kentish towns and cities having two railway stations and several otherwise uneconomic lines being built. LCDR started out as the East Kent Railway in 1858, with the aim of linking the North East Kent coast with the SER's North Kent Line. The LCDR's main line started from the Medway Towns and progressed eastwards via Sittingbourne and Faversham, before dividing to Dover via Canterbury and Thanet via Whitstable and Herne Bay. The SER successfully prevented the LCDR from gaining a connection to its line in Strood, so the LCDR was forced to build its own line to London, opening in 1861. The LCDR achieved this by connecting to the Mid-Kent Railway near Bromley, which connected to the West End of London and Crystal Palace Railway which gave it access to the Victoria Station & Pimlico Railway Company and its Victoria Station. It soon built extensions to Sevenoaks (Bat & Ball) (1862), Ashford via Maidstone (1862), and a second London terminus (Blackfriars leading on to Holborn Viaduct - 1864–65).

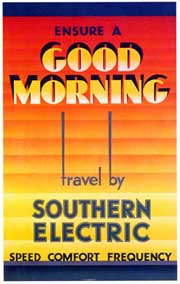
1933 poster for the Southern Railway's newly electrified suburban services

The extensive competition saw the SER build a very expensive deviation via Orpington and Sevenoaks to avoid the lengthy and circuitous route via Redhill, opening in 1868. Thus towns such as Bromley, Gravesend, Strood, Rochester, Chatham, Sevenoaks, Maidstone, Canterbury, Whitstable, Ramsgate, Margate, Dover and Ashford 'enjoyed' having two stations.

The competition severely strained the resources of both companies, the LCDR given its later start, and the SER with neighbouring LBSCR to the west in Sussex and Surrey. Co-operation broke out with a joint line between Dover and Deal, but despite a carve up agreement of coastal traffic, competition still persisted leading to Thames terminals being constructed in the middle of the North Kent marshes by both companies (the Hundred of Hoo Railway and the Port Victoria branch). Eventually a "merger" by form of a "managing committee" (to avoid capital gains tax) was agreed and the South Eastern and Chatham Railway (SECR) was formed in 1899. Only some minor rationalisation was able to occur prior to World War I (the SER's Chatham branch closed, various connecting chords were constructed, etc.).

In the aftermath of World War I, with the SECR having borne extensive amounts of war traffic, the government "grouped" all the railway companies together, with the SECR joining neighbouring LBSCR and LSWR in the Southern Railway in 1921.

Southern kept closed some inner London routes closed under wartime austerity measures, but embarked upon continuing SECR's rationalisation and a roll out of 660 V DC third rail electrification that had been successfully initiated by LSWR pre war. During the 1920s the inner suburban lines were electrified out to Dartford, Bromley and Orpington (1924–26). The 1930s saw the outer suburban services electrified; Sevenoaks (1935) and Gillingham (1939) and Maidstone West (1939). Electric traction thus epitomised the growth of commuting and the spread of the London commuter belt. The major item of rationalisation was the extensive work on Thanet, which saw the duplication removed.

World War II further devastated the railways, and post war the government nationalised the railways, forming British Railways in 1948, with Southern being placed in the Southern Region. The 1955 British Transport Commissioners report planned out a major investment programme in the railways and Kent Coast Electrification was one of the 5 key projects. This saw the main lines to the ports electrified in two stages between 1959 and 1961. The signally was upgraded, new rolling stock purchased, platforms significantly lengthen and the track was widened between Bickley Junction and Swanley. However, despite this massive investment, several remote lines were closed due to declining traffic and the infamous Beeching report. From the 1950s through to the 1980s branches closed including: Hawkhurst, Elham Valley, Canterbury and Whitstable Railway, Hythe, Sheppey Light Railway, Westerham, Hundred of Hoo (passengers only), and Gravesend West.

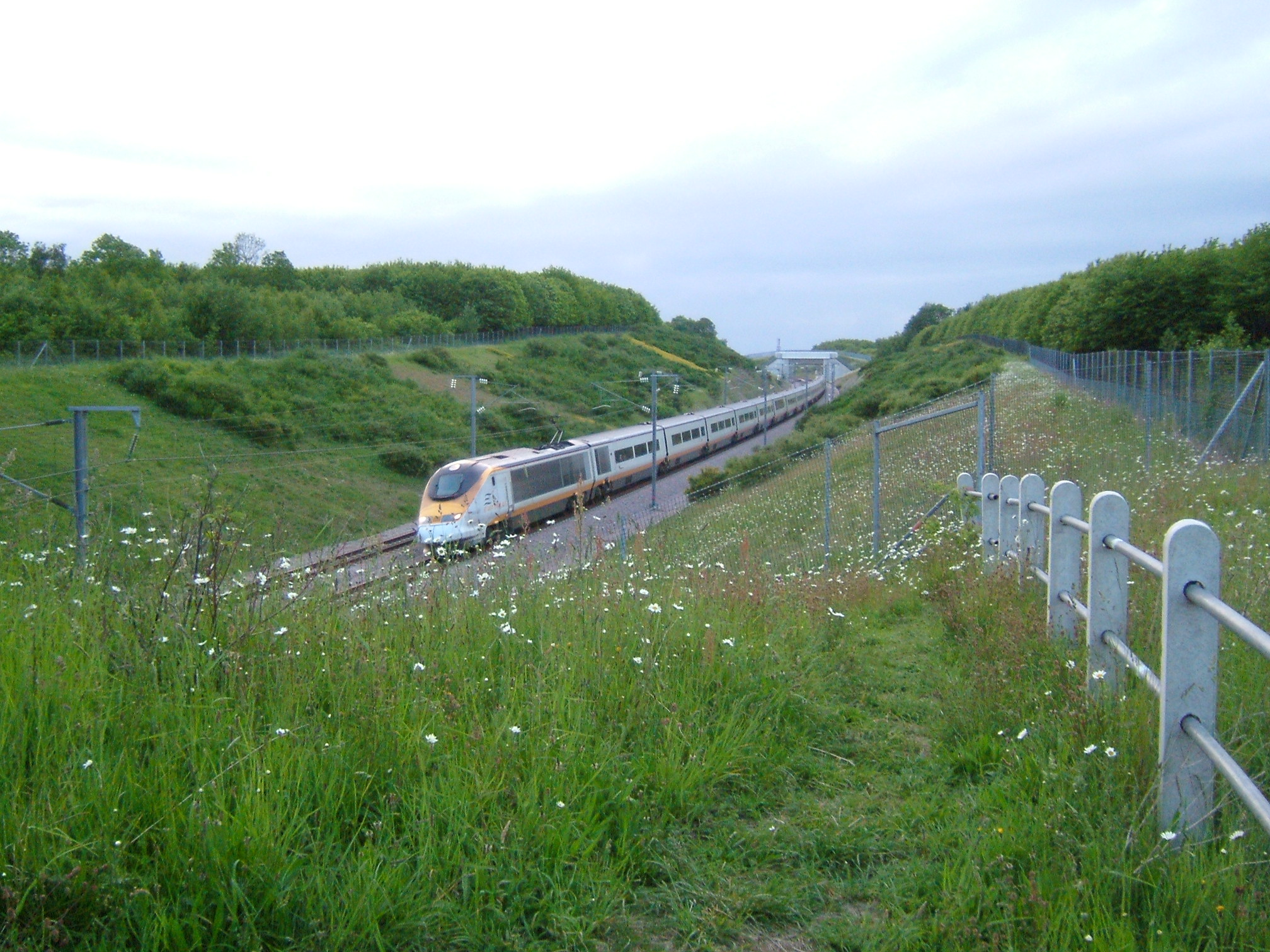
A Eurostar train at km 48 on High Speed 1, near Strood

By the 1980s, the Channel Tunnel was being built and a new high-speed link was needed to access St Pancras, but the choice of route was contentious. Before it opened, Eurostar trains had conductor shoes fitted and ran on primarily the South Eastern Main Line and other third rail lines to London Waterloo. Phase 1 of High Speed 1 opened in 2003 to near Gravesend and the line fully opened in 2007. There are two stations on the rail link in Kent, Ebbsfleet International between Dartford and Gravesend and Ashford International both offering services to Lille, Paris and Brussels. Extra commuter services to London served by Class 395 "Javelins" were introduced in 2009.

The late 1980s saw the organization of the railways change again, first with the "sectorisation" of British Rail with the abolition of the "Southern Region" and introduction of Network SouthEast for passenger services. The railways were privatised in 1996, with most Kent passenger services being run by Connex South Eastern (14 October 1996 to 9 November 2003). Connex encountered financial difficulties but embarked upon the mass replacement of the large obsolete rolling stock fleet. A temporary government owned Train operating company, South Eastern Trains ran from November 2003 to March 2006 to be replaced by the current incumbent Southeastern. Southern also run some services to Tonbridge and Ashford International.

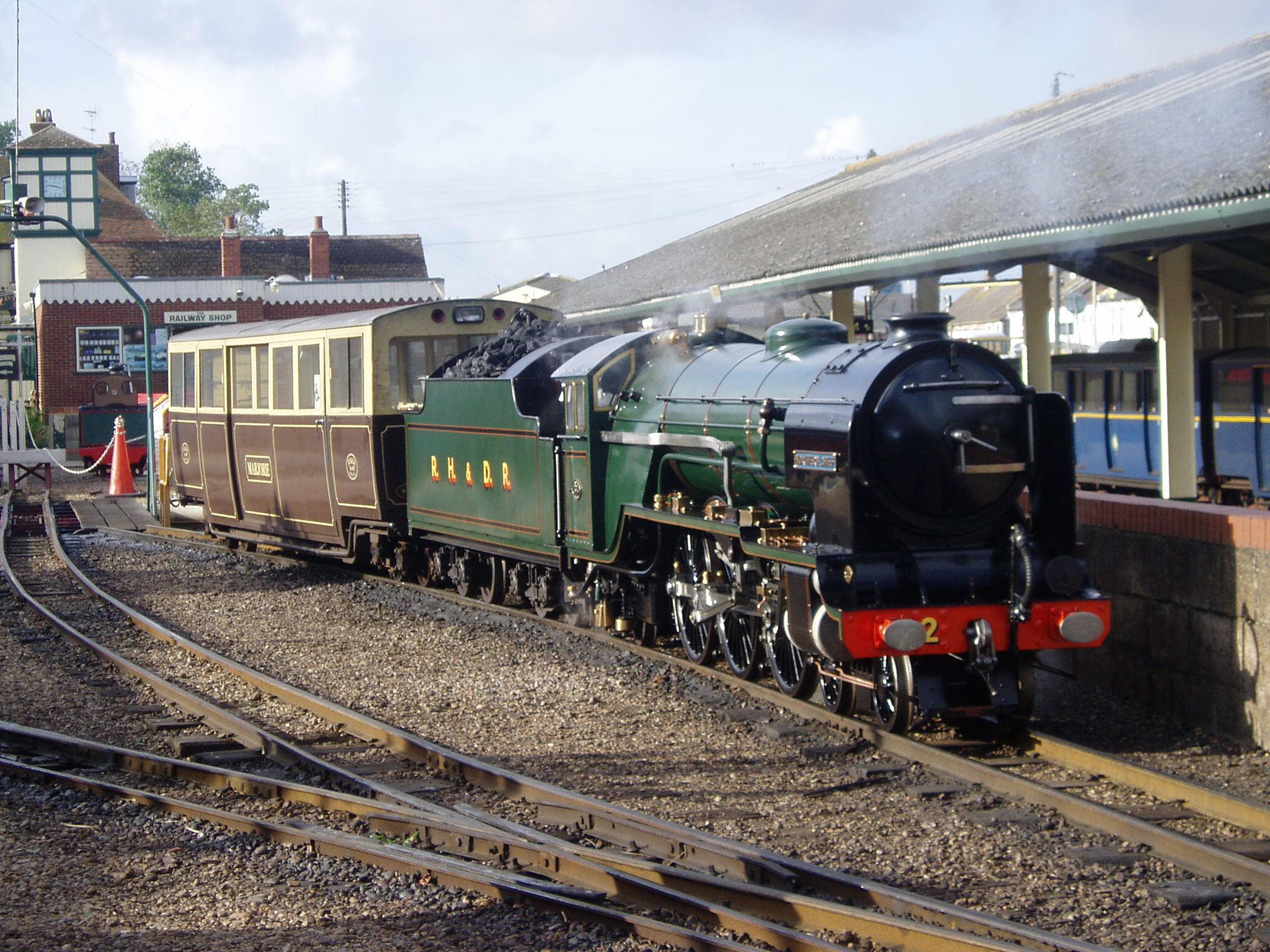
Romney, Hythe and Dymchurch Railway

In addition to the "mainline" railways there are several light, heritage and industrial railways in Kent. There are three heritage, standard gauge railways; Spa Valley Railway near Tunbridge Wells on the old Tunbridge Wells West branch, East Kent Railway on the old East Kent coalfield area and the Kent and East Sussex Railway on the Weald around Tenterden. In addition there is the 15 inch gauge, tourist oriented Romney, Hythe and Dymchurch Railway on the south east Kent coast along the Dungeness peninsular and the 2 ft 6in, ex industrial Sittingbourne & Kemsley Light Railway.

== Air ==
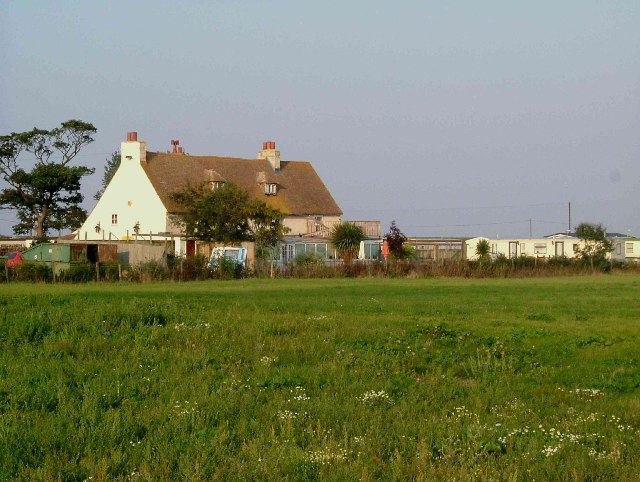
Muswell Manor, Isle of Sheppey - the birthplace and cradle of British aviation

Kent was the forefront of the development of aviation in the UK with the Royal Aero Club in 1901 at Leysdown on the Isle of Sheppey for balloon flying. This soon explained with the Short Brothers starting to base Wright flyer from Shellbeach in July 1909. This soon moved to nearby Eastchurch. Shorts moved production to Rochester in 1913, where they constructed seaplanes along the banks of the River Medway and aeroplanes from the nearby Rochester Airport.

Military Aviation was widespread throughout the county, with the embryonic Royal Air Force at Biggin Hill and the Navy at Manston, near Ramsgate. Many other air stations sprung up across the county due to its strategic position aside the channel and in the most direct flight path of enemy bombers heading for the capital and other targets (e.g. Chatham Dockyard was bombed in World War I).

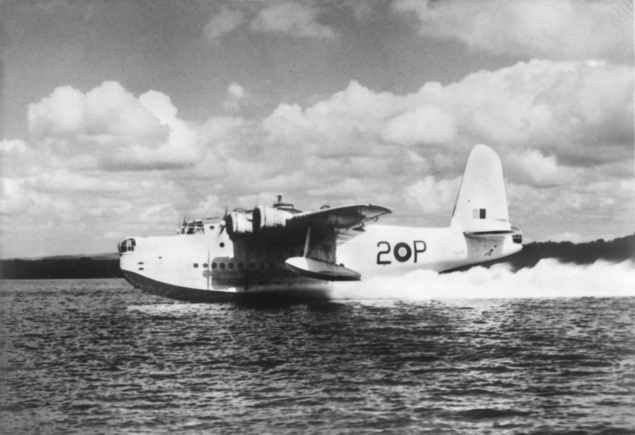
A Shorts Sunderland flying boat

With the approach of World War II, Shorts opened a second factory in Belfast as their Kent base was vulnerable to aerial bombardment. During World War II aircraft manufacturing continued at both sites while also sustaining continual bombardment form the Axis air forces. The RAF fought the Battle of Britain over the skies of Kent and numerous fighter stations were created to base fighters; Biggin Hill, Gravesend, West Malling, Hawkinge and Lympne, while Eastchurch, Manston and Detling were under Coastal Command. Post-war Biggin Hill and West Malling continued as fighter bases while Manston was by the United States Air Force's Strategic Air Command and later United States Air Forces in Europe. Due to its length, it was a V-bomber dispersal base. Due to their short runways (Biggin Hill and West Malling), but more generally Post Cold war defence cuts and the populated nature of Kent, the RAF bases were closed in the late 1980s and early 1990s. The other World War II airfields have largely been developed over the years (as has West Malling). Shorts seaplane business closed after the Second World War with the demise the Flying Boat business, while the works at Rochester airport continue to make military aviation equipment, currently owned by BAE Systems.

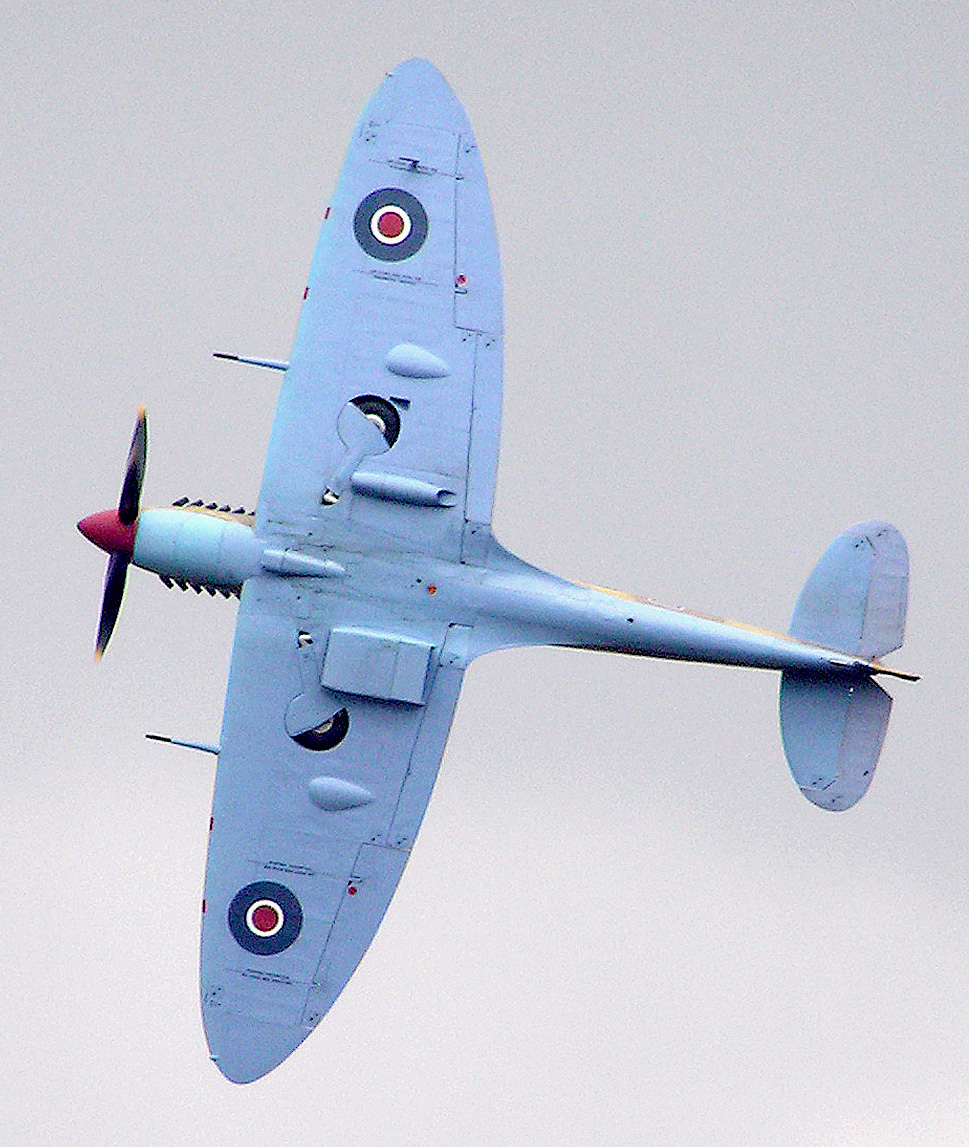
RAF fighters, most notably the Spitfire (pictured) and Hurricane fought the Battle of Britain across the skies of Kent

Manston Airport was used as a commercial airport from 1989 until its closure in 2014. It is set to reopen in 2025 or 2026, with cargo and short haul flights taking off from it by 2028 or 2029.

Currently Biggin Hill and Lydd serve as "outer" airport for London (general passenger aviation across the south east uses Heathrow, Gatwick, Stansted and Luton airports). A limited number of charter flights and private jets use Lydd ("London Ashford") and Biggin Hill ("London Biggin Hill"). The remoteness of Lydd hinders further development.

Light aviation continues in Kent at the grass airfields of Rochester and Headcorn and at the two tarmaced airfields. The continued urbanisation of Kent and planning constraints have in recent times threatened Rochester airport with development, while continued aviation activities still encounter opposition on the grounds of noise pollution.

== Bus ==
Up until the 1986 deregulation of the bus industry, many bus services were operated by municipal bus companies such as Boro'line Maidstone and Maidstone Corporation Transport. Other privately owned operators such as the East Kent Road Car Company and Maidstone & District were absorbed by the National Bus Company.

After deregulation these were gradually taken over by large transport groups and today operators include Arriva Southern Counties, Metrobus, Nu-Venture, Renown Coaches, Stagecoach in East Kent and Southdown PSV.

Commuter services are operated by Chalkwell Coaches, The Kings Ferry and Redwing Coaches into Central London.

== See also ==
- List of railway stations in Kent
