= Gravesend power station =

Former coal-fired power station in England

- Country: England
- Location: Gravesend, Kent
- Coordinates: 51°26′32″N 00°22′59″E
- Status: Decommissioned and demolished
- Construction began: 1900
- Commission date: 1903
- Decommission date: 1970
- Owners: Gravesend Corporation (1902–1948); British Electricity Authority (1948–1955); Central Electricity Authority (1955–1957); Central Electricity Generating Board (1958–1970)
- Operator: As owner

Thermal power station
- Primary fuel: Coal
- Turbine technology: Steam turbines
- Cooling source: Well water

Power generation
- Units operational: 1 x 2 MW plus 2 x 5 MW
- Make and model: British Thomson-Houston
- Nameplate capacity: 12 MW
- Annual net output: 11.3 GWh (1936/7)

Gravesend power station was built by the Gravesend Corporation in 1902–03 to supply the local demand for electricity for lighting. It was built to the west of the municipal gas works, south east of the basin on the Thames and Medway canal. The power station operated until 1970 the buildings were reused but were demolished in 1995.

== The building ==
Gravesend power station comprised a long engine room with a short, taller boiler house to the north, and an office block to the east; the boiler house had three tall chimneys. The engine room walls were of stock brick with red brick dressings. The interior of the engine room was lit by 13 high level circular windows on the long elevation, and tall windows in the west gable end. New generating equipment was added as the demand for electricity increased.

== Equipment specification ==
In 1923 the coal fired boilers were supplying 76,000 lb/h (9.58 kg/s) of steam to:

- 1 × 1,000 kW turbo-alternator AC
- 1 × 2,000 kW turbo-alternator AC
- 1 × 100 kW reciprocating engine DC
- 1 × 300 kW reciprocating engine DC

These had a total generating capacity of 3400 kW.

New plant was added 1921–26 comprising:

- Boilers:
  - 3 × Babcock and Wilcox and 1 × Yarrow boilers with capacity of 1 × 50,000 lb/h (6.3 kg/s), 2 × 40,000 lb/h (5.04 kg/s) and 1 × 20,000 lb/hr (2.51 kg/s), a total generating capacity of 150,000 lb/hr (18.9 kg/s). Steam conditions were 205 and 215 psi and 560 °F, 590 °F and 600 °F (14.1 and 14.8 bar and 293 °C, 310 °C, 315 °C). The boilers supplied steam to:
- 1 × 2.0 MW British Thomson-Houston turbo-alternator operating at 6.6 kV
- 2 × 5.0 MW British Thomson-Houston turbo-alternator operating at 6.6 kV
- 1 × 750 kW Metropolitan-Vickers rotary converter operating at 6.3 kV/480 V.

By 1966 the installed generating capacity was 12 MW. The coal-fired chain gate boilers produced 147,000 lb/hr (18.5 kg/s) of steam at 175/215 psi (12.1/14.8 bar) and 285 °C.

The condenser cooling system was unusual in being cooled with water abstracted from wells.

== Operating data ==
In 1912 the power station was supplying 36 public arc lights and 377 incandescent lights in the town. By 1919 there were no arc lights but there were 453 public lamps in Gravesend.

The generating capacity, maximum load, and electricity generated and sold (1913–37) was as follows:

Gravesend power station generating capacity, load and electricity produced and sold
| Year | Generating capacity, MW | Maximum load, MW | Electricity generated, GWh | Electricity sold, GWh |
|---|---|---|---|---|
| 1912/3 | 1.050 | 0.855 | 1.601 | 1.179 |
| 1918/9 | 1.850 | 1.275 | 3.517 | 2.456 |
| 1919/20 | 1.850 | 1.557 | 4.379 | 3.098 |
| 1923/4 | 8.400 | 3.125 | 10.241 | 8.135 |
| 1936/7 | 13.40 | 9.67 | 11.283 | 33.333 |

=== Operating data 1921–23 ===
Detailed operating data for the period 1921–23 is shown in the table:

Gravesend power station operating data 1921–23
| Electricity Use | Units | Year | | |
| Electricity Use | Units | 1921 | 1922 | 1923 |
|---|---|---|---|---|
| Lighting and domestic use | MWh | 2878 | 3899 | 5396 |
| Public lighting use | MWh | 133 | 134 | 205 |
| Traction | MWh | 482 | 453 | 480 |
| Power use | MWh | Included in lighting and domestic | | |
| Total use | MWh | 3493 | 4488 | 6081 |
Load and connected load
| Maximum load | kW | 1915 | 2250 | 2760 |
| Total connections | kW | 3710 | 4899 | 4880 |
| Load factor | Per cent | 29.8 | 33.4 | 34.4 |
Financial
| Revenue from sales of current | £ | – | 52,734 | 46,862 |
| Surplus of revenue over expenses | £ | – | 18,489 | 19,126 |

There was significant growth of demand and use of electricity.

Under the terms of the Electricity (Supply) Act 1926 (16 & 17 Geo. 5. c. 51) the Central Electricity Board (CEB) was established in 1926. The CEB identified high efficiency ‘selected’ power stations that would supply electricity most effectively. The CEB also constructed the National Grid (1927–33) to connect power stations within a region.

=== Operating data 1946 ===
Gravesend power station operating data in 1946 was:

Gravesend power station operating data, 1946
| Year | Load factor per cent | Max output load MW | Electricity supplied GWh | Thermal efficiency per cent |
|---|---|---|---|---|
| 1946 | – | 13,730 | 10.103 | – |

The British electricity supply industry was nationalised in 1948 under the provisions of the Electricity Act 1947 (10 & 11 Geo. 6. c. 54). The Gravesend electricity undertaking was abolished, ownership of Gravesend power station was vested in the British Electricity Authority, and subsequently the Central Electricity Authority and the Central Electricity Generating Board (CEGB).#council At the same time the electricity distribution and sales responsibilities of the Gravesend electricity undertaking were transferred to the South Eastern Electricity Board (SEEBOARD).

=== Operating data 1954–69 ===
Operating data for the period 1954–69 is shown in the table:

Gravesend power station operating data, 1954–79
| Year | Running hours or load factor (per cent) | Max output capacity MW | Electricity supplied GWh | Thermal efficiency per cent |
|---|---|---|---|---|
| 1954 | 746 | 10 | 4.183 | 12.53 |
| 1955 | 1234 | 10 | 6.138 | 13.17 |
| 1956 | 683 | 9 | 3.746 | 10.66 |
| 1957 | 430 | 9 | 2.358 | 10.4 |
| 1958 | 375 | 9 | 2.072 | 8.61 |
| 1961 | 3.5 % | 10 | 3.096 | 9.79 |
| 1962 | 4.2% | 10 | 3.644 | 9.89 |
| 1963 | 7.62 % | 10 | 6.673 | 12.19 |
| 1966 | 6.6 % | 10 | 5.780 | 10.38 |
| 1967 | 2.0 % | 10 | 1.746 | 8.60 |
| 1968 | 2.1 % | 10 | 1.828 | 8.14 |
| 1969 | 0.2 % | 10 | 0.208 | 4.91 |

Electricity supplied in MWh over the power station's operating life

In 1958 the Gravesend electricity district supplied an area of 98 square miles and a population of 104,280. The amount of electricity sold and the number and types of consumers was as follows:

| Year | Electricity sold, MWh | No. of consumers |
|---|---|---|
| 1956 | 364,139 | 34,158 |
| 1957 | 412,179 | 35,184 |
| 1958 | 389,597 | 36,149 |

In 1958 the above totals were made up of the following:

| Type of Consumer | No. of consumers | Electricity sold, MWh |
|---|---|---|
| Domestic | 32,916 | 56,036 |
| Commercial | 2,614 | 17,008 |
| Industrial | 326 | 312,966 |
| Farms | 278 | 2,016 |
| Public lighting | 15 | 1,571 |
| Total | 36,149 | 389,597 |

== Closure ==
The station was decommissioned in 1970. After closure the GEGB converted the station to a scientific research base, which continued in use until 1993. The buildings were demolished in 1995.

== See also ==
- Timeline of the UK electricity supply industry
- List of power stations in England
