= Toni Mount =

British historian and author

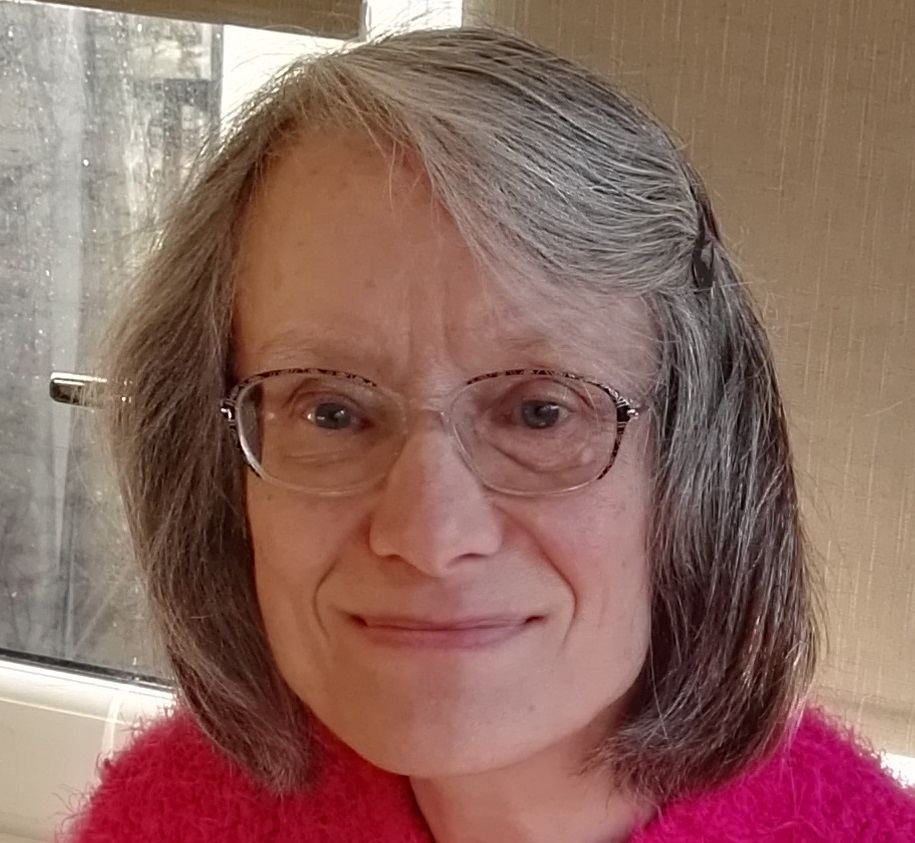
- Born: Westminster, London
- Education: MA by research University of Kent
- Occupations: Writer, teacher, speaker
- Known for: Sebastian Foxley murder mysteries
- Notable work: Everyday Life in Medieval London
- Spouse: Glenn Mount (m. 1975)
- Website: www.tonimount.com

Toni Mount is a historian and author from Gravesend, Kent, England. She is known as the author of non-fiction medieval history books including Everyday Life in Medieval London. and the Sebastian Foxley series of medieval murder mysteries.

== Career, further and higher education ==
She obtained a Certificate in Education in Post Compulsory Education and Training from the University of Greenwich. In 1999 she started teaching history to adults for the Workers' Educational Association in West Wickham Kent, going on to run classes in Petts Wood, Tonbridge, Tunbridge Wells and Rochester, ultimately running classes independently in Rochester and Gravesend. Mount also gives talks to groups and societies on a variety of subjects, the most popular being based on her 'Medieval Housewives' book Her research into the history of London also examined the Great Fire of 1212.

== Writing career ==
Having self-published several books she sent an idea to Amberley Books who subsequently published Everyday Life in Medieval London. Amberley went on to publish several other titles by Mount including The Medieval Housewife A Year in the Life of Medieval England (2016) and The World of Isaac Newton (2020). In 2015 Amberley also published Dragon's Blood and Willow Bark: the mysteries of medieval medicine. When the paperback was published in 2016 the name was changed to Medieval Medicine: Its Mysteries and Science although the eBook remains under the original title.

In 2015 she was interviewed by Robert Elms on BBC Radio and started writing for Tudor Life Magazine and created online courses for the website medievalcourses.com. Madeglobal Publishing also went on to publish her Sebastian Foxley murder mystery novels.

Toni Mount has contributed articles for BBC History Extra and Dan Snow's History Hit, The Ricardian Bulletin and literary festivals in Rochester and Hastings.

== Books and other published works ==
Echoes from History (Self-Published)

2007 The Medieval Housewives and Women of the Middle-ages

2008 Mrs Beeton's Victorian Christmas

2009 Richard III King of Controversy

2013 Dare they be Doctors

2015 Richard III King of Controversy (updated 2015)

2016 Medieval Gravesend

Amberley Publishing

2014 (Hb) Everyday Life in Medieval London

2015 (Hb) Dragon’s Blood and Willow Bark: the mysteries of medieval medicine

2015 (Pb) Everyday Life in Medieval London

2015 (Pb) The Medieval Housewife & Other Women of the Middle Ages

2016 (Pb) Medieval Medicine: Its Mysteries and Science (the paperback version of Dragon’s Blood)

2016 (Hb) A Year in the Life of Medieval England

2019 (Pb) A Year in the Life of Medieval England

2020 (Hb) The World of Isaac Newton (November 2020)

MadeGlobal Publishing

The Sebastian Foxley Medieval Murder Mysteries series:

2016 The Colour of Poison

2016 The Colour of Gold

2017 The Colour of Cold Blood

2017 The Colour of Betrayal

2018 The Colour of Murder

2018 The Colour of Death

2019 The Colour of Lies

2020 The Colour of Shadows

2021 The Colour of Evil

other titles

2018 The Death Collector (A Victorian Melodrama)

Pen & Sword Books

2021 How to Survive in Medieval England

2024 How to Survive in Anglo-Saxon England

Medievalcourses.com

2015 Everyday Life of Medieval Folk

2016 Heroes and Villains

2016 Richard III and the Wars of the Roses

2016 Warrior Kings of England – The Story of the Plantagenet Dynasty

2017 England’s Crime and Punishment through the Ages

2017 The English Reformation: A religious revolution

2017 The Roles of Medieval and Tudor Women
