= Frederick Holbourn =

Frederick William Holbourn (16 July 1896 – 1967) was a totally disabled war pensioner who worked to achieve justice for war pensioners in the United Kingdom in the years following World War I.

Holbourn was educated at Gravesend Elementary School, married Jennie Ann Jefferson, and had one son, Jack Holbourn.

== Service ==
- 1919, 1920 – management committee of the Borough league
- 1921, 1923 – Vice-Chairman of "Gravesend Rovers FC."
- 1918, 1921 – Management Committee Services Rendered Club and Discharged Soldiers and Sailors Association, Sports Secretary
- 1921–32 – Sports, Finance and Ways and Means Committee
- 1921–29 — British Legion Relief Fund Committee
- 1925–32 – United Services Fund representative
- 1926 – Vice Chairman of British Legion
- 1924–26 – Chairman British Legion Relief Fund
  - 1926–27 – Hon. Sec., 1922–23 – Vice Chairman
- 1924, 1932 – Poppy Day Committee member (Chairman 1924–1926)
- 1924–25 – Chairman St Dunstan's Flag Day

He was also the Hon. Secretary to the Benevolent Advisory Committee, 1925~28; Voluntary War Pensions worker attached to Medway Boroughs Pensions Committee 1925~33; a member of Medway Boroughs Pensions Committee, 1929/30; Chairman, of the British Legion employment Committee; and secretary to the British Legion War Orphans; Branch Assistant Sec., 1920~23 and 1931; Branch Treasurer 1931/32; British Legion and United Services Fund Benevolent Committee, and Secretary to the British Legion Turf Cricket Club 1928/29.

He went on to assist in the founding of the Tuberculosis Aftercare Committee; and became Hon. Sec. of Groups 10 and 9 of the British Legion; Honorary Secretary for the Soldiers, Sailors and Airmen’s Families Association for Gravesend; and delegate to Kent Conferences of the British Legion.

He died in 1967 in hospital in Gravesend, having lived at Oak Road for much of his life.
