= Beluncle Halt railway station =

Disused railway station in Middle Stoke, Medway, England

Coordinates: 51°26′01″N 0°35′37″E

Beluncle Halt
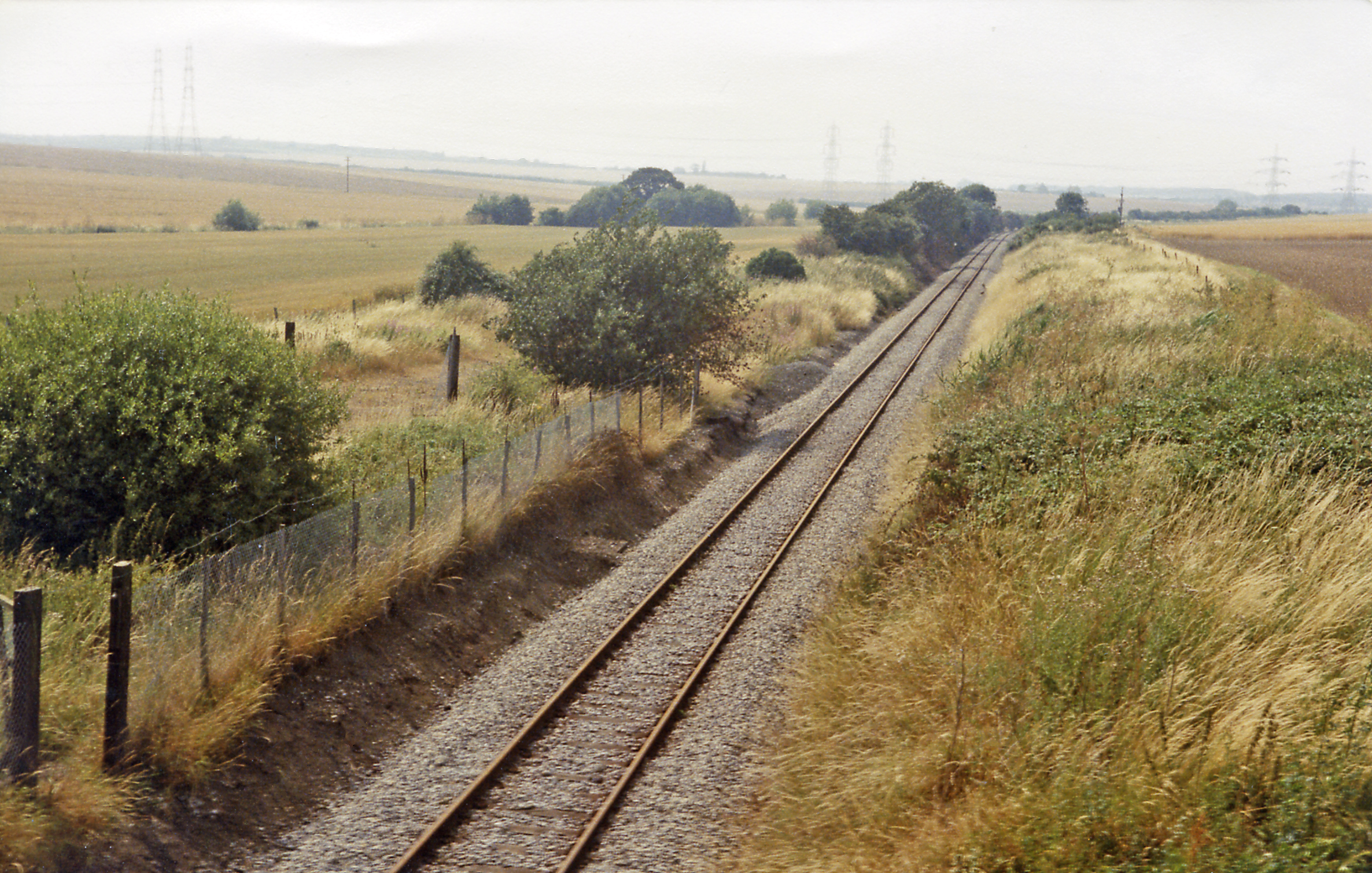
- Site of the station in 1983

General information
- Location: Middle Stoke, Medway; England
- Grid reference: TQ803787
- Platforms: 1

Other information
- Status: Disused

History
- Pre-grouping: South Eastern & Chatham Railway
- Post-grouping: Southern Railway; Southern Region of British Railways

Key dates
- July 1906: Opened
- 4 December 1961: Closed
Location

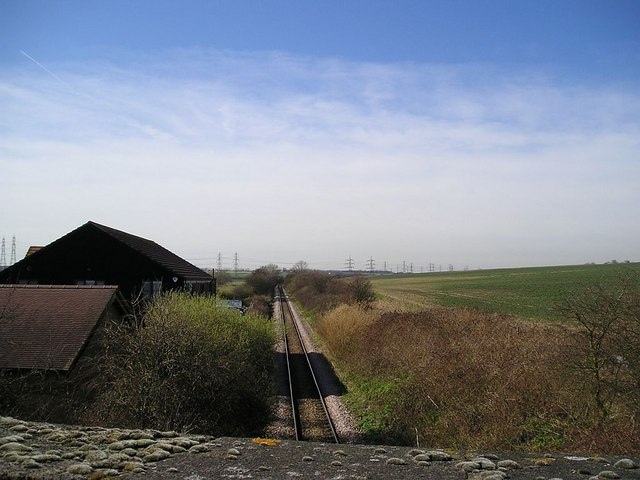
Site of Beluncle Halt

Beluncle Halt was a halt on the Hundred of Hoo Railway between Sharnal Street station and Middle Stoke halt. It was opened in July 1906 and closed to passengers on 4 December 1961. Although officially called Beluncle Halt the nameboard simply read Beluncle.

Preceding station	Disused railways	Following station
Sharnal Street	7/1906 to 31-12-1922; SECR; Hundred of Hoo Railway	Middle Stoke Halt
Sharnal Street	1-1-1923 to 31-12-1947; SR; Hundred of Hoo Railway	Middle Stoke Halt
Sharnal Street	1-1-1948 to 3-12-1961; BR(S); Hundred of Hoo Railway	Middle Stoke Halt

== Sources ==
- Kidner, R. W. (1985). Southern Railway Halts. Survey and Gazetteer. Headington, Oxford: The Oakwood Press. ISBN 0-85361-321-4.
