= Grain Crossing Halt railway station =

Disused railway station in Kent, England

Grain Crossing Halt
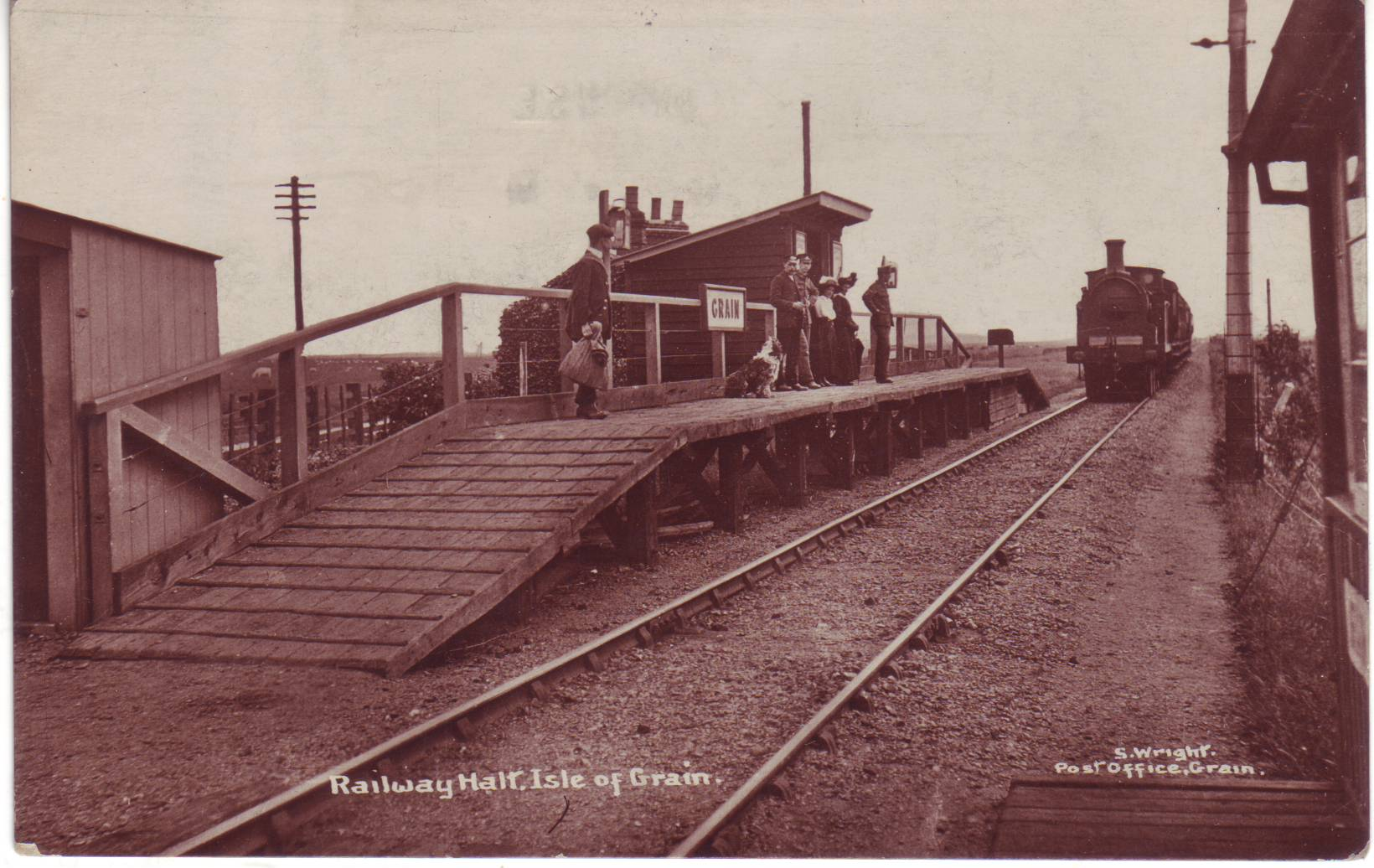

General information
- Location: Middle Stoke, Medway; England
- Grid reference: TQ863753
- Platforms: 1

Other information
- Status: Disused

History
- Pre-grouping: South Eastern & Chatham Railway
- Post-grouping: Southern Railway; Southern Region of British Railways

Key dates
- 1 July 1906: Opened
- 11 June 1951: Closed to passengers but bus service provided
- 3 September 1951: closed completely when Grain station opened
Location

Grain Crossing Halt (TQ 863 753 51°26′45″N 0°40′55″E) was a halt on the Hundred of Hoo Railway between Stoke Junction Halt and Port Victoria station in the UK. It was opened on 1 July 1906 and closed to passengers on 11 June 1951. A bus service operated until 3 September 1951, when it was replaced by Grain station. Although officially named Grain Crossing Halt the station nameboard read Grain Halt

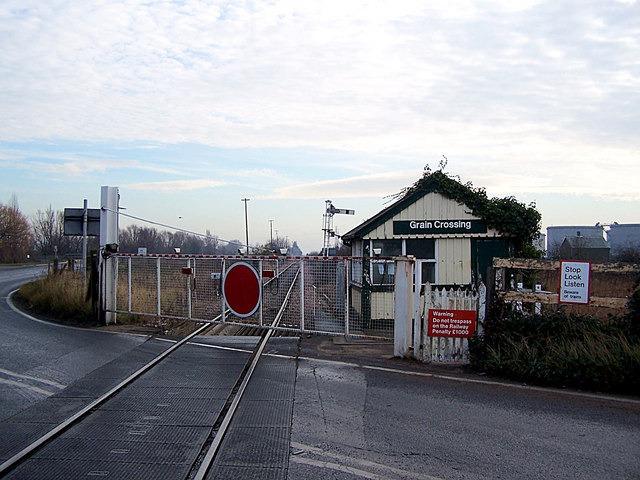
Site of Grain Crossing Halt

Preceding station	Disused railways	Following station
Middle Stoke Halt	1-7-1906 to 31-12-1922; SECR; Hundred of Hoo Railway	Port Victoria
Middle Stoke Halt	1-1-1923 to 15-5-1932; SR; Hundred of Hoo Railway	Port Victoria
Stoke Junction Halt	16-5-1932 to 31-12-1947; SR; Hundred of Hoo Railway	Port Victoria
Stoke Junction Halt	1-1-1948 to 10-6-1951; BR(S); Hundred of Hoo Railway	Port Victoria

== Sources. ==
- Kidner, R. W. (1985). Southern Railway Halts. Survey and Gazetteer. Headington, Oxford: The Oakwood Press. ISBN 0-85361-321-4.
