= Stoke Junction Halt railway station =

Disused railway station in Kent, England

Stoke Junction Halt
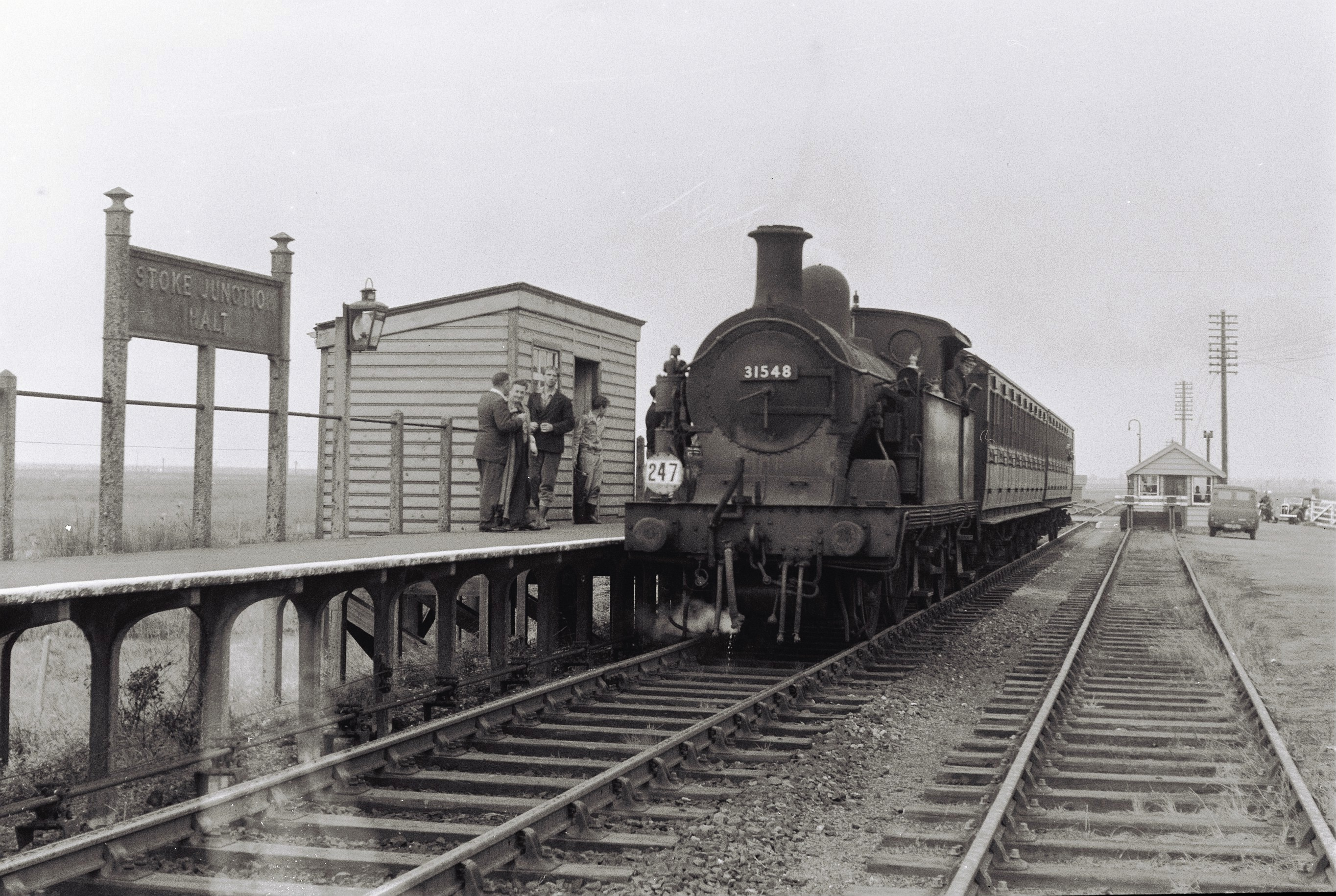
- The station in 1958

General information
- Location: Middle Stoke, Medway; England
- Grid reference: TQ843756
- Platforms: 1

Other information
- Status: Disused

History
- Post-grouping: Southern Railway; Southern Region of British Railways

Key dates
- 17 July 1932: Opened
- 4 December 1961: Closed
Location

Stoke Junction Halt (TQ 843 756 51°26′57″N 0°39′02″E) was a halt on the Hundred of Hoo Railway between Middle Stoke Halt and Grain Crossing Halt, it was also at the junction of the line to Allhallows-on-Sea. It was opened on 17 July 1932 and closed on 4 December 1961.

Preceding station	Disused railways	Following station
Middle Stoke Halt	17-7-1932 to 31-12-1947; SR; Hundred of Hoo Railway	Grain Crossing Halt or Allhallows-on-Sea
Middle Stoke Halt	1-1-1948 to 10-7-1951; BR(S); Hundred of Hoo Railway	Grain Crossing Halt or Allhallows-on-Sea
Middle Stoke Halt	11-7-1951 to 2-9-1951; BR(S); Hundred of Hoo Railway	Allhallows-on-Sea
Middle Stoke Halt	3-9-1951 to 3-12-1961; BR(S); Hundred of Hoo Railway	Grain or Allhallows-on-Sea

== Sources. ==
- Kidner, R. W. (1985). Southern Railway Halts. Survey and Gazetteer. Headington, Oxford: The Oakwood Press. ISBN 0-85361-321-4.
