= Middle Stoke Halt railway station =

Disused railway station in Kent, England

Middle Stoke Halt

General information
- Location: Middle Stoke, Medway; England
- Grid reference: TQ833753
- Platforms: 1

Other information
- Status: Disused

History
- Pre-grouping: South Eastern & Chatham Railway
- Post-grouping: Southern Railway; Southern Region of British Railways

Key dates
- 1 July 1906: Opened
- 4 December 1961: Closed
Location

Middle Stoke Halt (TQ 833 753 51°26′49″N 0°38′09″E) was a halt on the Hundred of Hoo Railway. It was opened in July 1906 and closed to passengers on 4 December 1961.

Preceding station	Disused railways	Following station
Beluncle Halt	7/1906 to 31-12-1922; SECR; Hundred of Hoo Railway	Grain Crossing Halt
Beluncle Halt	1-1-1923 to 15-5-1932; SR; Hundred of Hoo Railway	Grain Crossing Halt
Beluncle Halt	16-5-1932 to 16-7-1932; SR; Hundred of Hoo Railway	Grain Crossing Halt or Allhallows-on-Sea
Beluncle Halt	17-7-1932 to 31-12-1947; SR; Hundred of Hoo Railway	Stoke Junction Halt
Beluncle Halt	1-1-1948 to 3-12-1961; BR(S); Hundred of Hoo Railway	Stoke Junction Halt

== Sources. ==
- Kidner, R. W. (1985). Southern Railway Halts. Survey and Gazetteer. Headington, Oxford: The Oakwood Press. ISBN 0-85361-321-4.
