= List of shipwrecks in March 1840 =

The list of shipwrecks in March 1840 includes ships sunk, foundered, grounded, or otherwise lost during March 1840.

== 1 March ==
List of shipwrecks: 1 March 1840
Ship	State	Description
Aid	United Kingdom	The ship was driven ashore at Folkestone, Kent.
Anna Margaretha	Hamburg	The ship was driven ashore on Norderney, Kingdom of Hanover. She was on a voyage from Sunderland, County Durham, United Kingdom to Altona.
Union	United Kingdom	The ship ran aground on the Nore. She was refloated the next day and resumed her voyage.

== 2 March ==
List of shipwrecks: 2 March 1840
Ship	State	Description
Amystas	United Kingdom	The ship ran aground at Exmouth, Devon. She was on a voyage from Exmouth to Teignmouth. Amystas was later refloated, she resumed her voyage on 7 March.
Mary	United Kingdom	The ship collided with Union (United Kingdom), which was aground on the Nore. She consequently sank in The Swale off Yantlet, Kent.
Wilberforce	United Kingdom	The ship ran aground at Exmouth. She was later refloated and put back to Exmouth.

== 3 March ==
List of shipwrecks: 3 March 1840
Ship	State	Description
Venus	United Kingdom	The ship was run down and sunk in the Bristol Channel off the coast of Glamorgan. Her crew were rescued.

== 4 March ==
List of shipwrecks: 4 March 1840
Ship	State	Description
Lascars	United Kingdom	The ship was driven ashore and wrecked at Redcar, Yorkshire. Her crew survived.
Mary	United Kingdom	The ship was wrecked near Beaumaris, Anglesey. Her crew were rescued. She was on a voyage from the Isle of Man to Liverpool, Lancashire.
Peace	United Kingdom	The collier foundered in the North Sea off Aldeburgh, Suffolk. Her crew were rescued.

== 5 March ==
List of shipwrecks: 5 March 1840
Ship	State	Description
Ewen	United Kingdom	The ship ran aground of the Nore and was wrecked. She was on a voyage from North Shields, County Durham to London. Ewen was refloated on 10 March and towed into Sheerness, Kent.
Henry	United Kingdom	The schooner was driven ashore and wrecked in Sandy Bay, Gibraltar. She was on a voyage from Smyrna, Ottoman Empire to Glasgow, Renfrewshire.

== 6 March ==
List of shipwrecks: 6 March 1840
Ship	State	Description
Aurora	Hamburg	The ship foundered 30 nautical miles (56 km) off Ringkøbing, Denmark. She was on a voyage from Hamburg to Poole, Dorset, United Kingdom.
John Duncombe	United Kingdom	The schooner was wrecked at "Capiti Beach", New Zealand. Her crew were rescued.
Percy	United Kingdom	The ship was driven ashore and damaged in Sinclair's Bay 8 nautical miles (15 km) north of Wick, Caithness. She was on a voyage from Sunderland, County Durham to Limerick. Percy was later refloated and towed to Stromness, Orkney Islands in a leaky condition.

== 7 March ==
List of shipwrecks: 7 March 1840
Ship	State	Description
Gem	United Kingdom	The ship struck a rock off Hendon, County Durham and was damaged. She was on a voyage from Sunderland, County Durham to Lisbon, Portugal. Gem put back to Sunderland.
Isabel	United Kingdom	The ship ran aground on the Delta Reef. She was on a voyage from New Orleans, Louisiana, United States to Halifax, Nova Scotia, British North America. Isabel was refloated and taken into Key West, Florida Territory, where she arrived on 11 March.

== 8 March ==
List of shipwrecks: 8 March 1840
Ship	State	Description
America	United States	The ship ran aground on the Florida Reef. She was on a voyage from New Orleans, Louisiana to a European port. America was later refloated.
Courier de Tampico	France	The ship was wrecked on Gorda Cay, Abaco Islands. Her crew were rescued. She was on a voyage from Tampico, Mexico to Bordeaux, Gironde.
Enchantress	United Kingdom	The ship was driven ashore at Teignmouth, Devon. she was refloated the next day.
Fenwick	United Kingdom	The ship was wrecked near Flamborough Head, Yorkshire. Her crew were rescued. She was on a voyage from South Shields, County Durham to London.
Hebe	United Kingdom	The ship ran aground on the Herd Sand, in the North Sea off the coast of County Durham. She was refloated.

== 9 March ==
List of shipwrecks: 9 March 1840
Ship	State	Description
Conradine	Prussia	The ship was driven ashore and wrecked at Hjørring, Denmark. She was on a voyage from Liverpool, Lancashire, United Kingdom to Pillau.
Mars	United Kingdom	The schooner struck a sunken rock and foundered in the English Channel off Mullion, Cornwall. Her crew survived. She was on a voyage from Swansea, Glamorgan to Plymouth, Devon.
Sovereign	United Kingdom	The ship sank off Ulverstone, Lancashire. Her crew were rescued. She was on a voyage from Runcorn, Cheshire to Ulverstone.
Victor	United Kingdom	The ship was driven ashore and wrecked at Hjørring. Her crew were rescued. She was on a voyage from Newcastle upon Tyne, Northumberland to Stettin.

== 10 March ==
List of shipwrecks: 10 March 1840
Ship	State	Description
Dumfriesshire	United Kingdom	The ship ran aground in the Mississippi River. She was on a voyage from New Orleans, Louisiana, United States to Liverpool, Lancashire.
Emerald	United Kingdom	The ship ran aground at Aberystwyth, Cardiganshire. she was on a voyage from Ipswich, Suffolk to Aberystwyth. She was refloated on 13 March.
Industry	United Kingdom	The ship struck the Newton Rock and foundered. Her five crew were rescued. She was on a voyage from Dundee, Forfarshire to London.

== 11 March ==
List of shipwrecks: 11 March 1840
Ship	State	Description
Charles	United Kingdom	The ship was run aground on the South Ridge, in the Bristol Channel off the coast of Glamorgan. She was refloated on 13 March.
Derwent	United Kingdom	The brig was wrecked on the "Tislerus". She was on a voyage from Sunderland, County Durham to Copenhagen, Denmark.
Hope	United Kingdom	The paddle steamer was wrecked near Cape St. Francis, Africa. All 72 passengers and crew reached shore on a constructed raft and a damaged jolly-boat. She was on a voyage from Table Bay to Algoa Bay.
Ouse	United Kingdom	The ship ran aground at King's Lynn, Norfolk and was damaged. She was on a voyage from Sunderland, County Durham to King's Lynn. Ouse was later refloated.
Puella	United Kingdom	The ship was driven ashore near Messina, Sicily. She was on a voyage from Newcastle upon Tyne, Northumberland to Messina. Puella was later refloated and taken into Messina.
Victoria	United Kingdom	The ship was driven ashore and wrecked at Breaksea Point, Glamorgan.

== 12 March ==
List of shipwrecks: 12 March 1840
Ship	State	Description
Gode Haab	Norway	The ship was lost near "Little Farder". Her crew were rescued.
Minerva	United Kingdom)	The ship ran aground on the Lynn Knock Sand, in The Wash, and sank. Her crew were rescued. She was on a voyage from Stockton-on-Tees, County Durham to King's Lynn, Norfolk.
Roman	United States	The ship was in collision with Richard Anderson (United Kingdom) and sank in the Irish Sea off Anglesey. Her crew were rescued. She was on a voyage from Savannah, Georgia to Liverpool, Lancashire, United Kingdom.

== 13 March ==
List of shipwrecks: 13 March 1840
Ship	State	Description
Catherina	Hamburg	The ship was driven ashore and wrecked near Ottendorf, Duchy of Holstein. Her crew were rescued. She was on a voyage from Leith, Lothian, United Kingdom to Hamburg.
Pomona	United Kingdom	The ship sank in the Queens Channel. Her crew were rescued. She was on a voyage from Cardiff, Glamorgan to London.
Provence	France	The ship was driven ashore and wrecked at Lucena, Paraíba Brazil. She was on a voyage from Bordeaux, Gironde to Rio de Janeiro, Brazil.
Victoria	United Kingdom	The ship was wrecked on Hat Key. She was on a voyage from New York, United States to British Honduras.

== 14 March ==
List of shipwrecks: 14 March 1840
Ship	State	Description
Lise	France	The barque was wrecked at Cape Agulhas, Cape Colony with the loss of twenty of the 33 people on board. She was on a voyage from Île Bourbon to Bordeaux, Gironde.

== 15 March ==
List of shipwrecks: 15 March 1840
Ship	State	Description
Alva	United Kingdom	The ship was abandoned in the Atlantic Ocean. Her crew were rescued by Pocahontas (United States). Alva was on a voyage from Halifax, Nova Scotia, British North America to Jamaica.
Catharina	Hamburg	The ship foundered off "Glamayer". Her crew were rescued. She was on a voyage from Leith, Lothian, United Kingdom to Hamburg.

== 16 March ==
List of shipwrecks: 16 March 1840
Ship	State	Description
Erie	United States	The whaler was wrecked in the Chatham Islands.
Jane	United Kingdom	The ship was driven ashore at the mouth of the River Tees.
Louisa	United Kingdom	The cutter was wrecked on Galina Point, Jamaica.
Memnon	United Kingdom	The ship was driven ashore at Great Yarmouth, Norfolk. She was on a voyage from London to Newcastle upon Tyne, Northumberland. Memnon was refloated.

== 17 March ==
List of shipwrecks: 17 March 1840
Ship	State	Description
Jane Ellen	United Kingdom	The ship foundered off Tresco, Isles of Scilly.
Regina	Netherlands	The ship departed from Batavia, Netherlands East Indies for Cowes, Isle of Wight, United Kingdom. No further trace, presumed foundered with the loss of all hands, probably on 10 April off Mauritius, or on 4 May.

== 18 March ==
List of shipwrecks: 18 March 1840
Ship	State	Description
Britannia Packet	United Kingdom	The schooner ran aground and capsized at Dundee, Forfarshire. She was on a voyage from Newcastle upon Tyne, Northumberland to Dundee.
Effort	United Kingdom	The ship was driven ashore and severely damaged at Sunderland, County Durham.
George	United Kingdom	The ship ran aground on the Hook of Margate Sand. She was on a voyage from London to Dartmouth, Devon. She was refloated and taken into Margate, Kent.
Orwell	United Kingdom	The ship ran aground in the Mississippi River. She was on a voyage from Liverpool, Lancashire to New Orleans, Louisiana, United States.

== 19 March ==
List of shipwrecks: 19 March 1840
Ship	State	Description
Swan	United Kingdom	The ship struck a rock off Fife Ness and foundered. Her crew were rescued. She was on a voyage from Alloa, Clackmannanshire to Dundee, Forfarshire.

== 20 March ==
List of shipwrecks: 20 March 1840
Ship	State	Description
George	United Kingdom	The ship ran aground and capsized at Stockton-on-Tees, County Durham. She was refloated on 26 March.
Iona	United Kingdom	The ship was wrecked on the Thistle Rock, off Gothenburg, Sweden. Her crew were rescued. She was on a voyage from Sunderland, County Durham to Gothenburg.
Mary	United Kingdom	The ship was abandoned in the Atlantic Ocean. Her crew were rescued by Pehr (flag unknown) before she foundered. Mary was on a voyage from London to New York, United States.
Pheasant	United Kingdom	The ship ran aground on the West Hoyle Bank, in Liverpool Bay and sank. Her crew were rescued. She was on a voyage from Swansea, Glamorgan to Liverpool, Lancashire.

== 21 March ==
List of shipwrecks: 21 March 1840
Ship	State	Description
Trois Monts	France	The ship was abandoned in the Mediterranean Sea off Menorca, Spain. She was on a voyage from Martinique to Marseille, Bouches-du-Rhône. Trois Montes Rouges was later taken into Bona, Algeria.

== 22 March ==
List of shipwrecks: 22 March 1840
Ship	State	Description
Green River	United States	The steamboat capsized in the Green River with the loss of nine lives.
Jane Helen	United Kingdom	The ship was driven ashore at Leith, Lothian. She was on a voyage from Leith to Grenada.
Mary Gordon	United Kingdom	The smack sprang a leak and was abandoned off Black Head, County Down. She was on a voyage from Londonderry to Whitehaven, Cumberland.

== 23 March ==
List of shipwrecks: 23 March 1840
Ship	State	Description
Anna	United Kingdom	The ship ran aground on the South Bull, off Drogheda, County Louth. Her crew were rescued. She was on a voyage from Ayr to Drogheda.
Mary	United Kingdom	The ship ran aground on the Stony Bank, in the North Sea off the mouth of the Humber. She was on a voyage from Hull, Yorkshire to Dunkerque, Nord, France. Mary was refloated on 29 March and towed into Hull.
Pallas	Sweden	The schooner was driven ashore at Wells-next-the-Sea, Norfolk, United Kingdom. Her crew were rescued. She was on a voyage from Gothenburg to Philippeville, Algeria. Pallas was refloated on 1 April and taken into Wells-next-the-Sea.
Swanage	United Kingdom	The ship was driven ashore at Swanage, Dorset.
Three Brothers	United Kingdom	The ship was in collision with Thomas and Mary (United Kingdom) and was then driven ashore at Swanage.
William and Sarah	United Kingdom	The ship was driven ashore at Swanage. She was later refloated.

== 24 March ==
List of shipwrecks: 24 March 1840
Ship	State	Description
Alfred	Sweden	The ship ran aground on the Lucy Sand, in the North Sea off then north coast of Kent, United Kingdom and was abandoned by her crew. She was on a voyage from Gothenburg to Algiers, Algeria.
Robert Raikes	United Kingdom	The ship ran aground on the Lapsand, off the coast of Denmark. She was on a voyage from Sunderland, County Durham to Helsingør, Denmark and Memel, Prussia. Robert Raikes was refloated the next day.
Union	United Kingdom	The ship ran aground at Drogheda, County Louth and was severely damaged. She was refloated on 27 March and beached.

== 25 March ==
List of shipwrecks: 25 March 1840
Ship	State	Description
Alfred	Sweden	The ship struck the Solg Sand, in the North Sea and was abandoned. She was on a voyage from Gothenburg to Algiers, Algeria.
Emblem	United States	The schooner capsized in the Atlantic Ocean with the loss of six of the eleven people on board. Survivors were rescued by the brig Charles Miller (United States). Emblem was on a voyage from Apalachicola, Florida Territory to Havana, Cuba.
Louise and Caroline	United Kingdom	The ship ran aground at Cuxhaven.

== 26 March ==
List of shipwrecks: 26 March 1840
Ship	State	Description
Providentia	Lübeck	The ship was abandoned in the North Sea. Her crew were rescued by Charlotte (United Kingdom). Providentia was on a voyage from Lübeck to King's Lynn, Norfolk, United Kingdom.

== 27 March ==
List of shipwrecks: 27 March 1840
Ship	State	Description
Delphinen	Norway	The ship was driven ashore on Møn, Denmark. Her crew were rescued. She was on a voyage from Bergen to a Baltic port.
Florence	United Kingdom	The ship ran aground on the Hook Sand, in the Solent. She was on a voyage from Bristol, Gloucestershire to Portsmouth, Hampshire.
Fifeshire	United Kingdom	The schooner was driven ashore at Lindisfarne. She was on a voyage from London to Kirkcaldy, Fife.

== 28 March ==
List of shipwrecks: 28 March 1840
Ship	State	Description
Fanny and Jane	United Kingdom	The ship ran aground between Lepanto and the "Castle of Roumelia". She was refloated on 31 March and subsequently put into Cephalonia or Zante, United States of the Ionian Islands.
Proteo	Kingdom of Sardinia	The ship was driven ashore on Fire Island, New York, United States. She was on a voyage from Genoa to Palermo, Sicily and New York City.
William	Prussia	The ship ran aground at Memel. She was on a voyage from Memel to Antwerp, Belgium.

== 30 March ==
List of shipwrecks: 30 March 1840
Ship	State	Description
Jane	United Kingdom	The ship was driven ashore at "Nakkehead", Denmark. She was on a voyage from Limekilns, Fife to Wismar.
Lerwick	United Kingdom	The ship ran aground on Broad Shoal, in Vineyard Sound. she was refloated but driven ashore and wrecked in Waquoit Bay. Her crew were rescued. Lerwick was on a voyage from the Turks Islands to Halifax, Nova Scotia, British North America.

== 31 March ==
List of shipwrecks: 31 March 1840
Ship	State	Description
Aston	United Kingdom	The ship was lost off "Molene". Her crew were rescued. She was on a voyage from Candia, Crete to Trieste.
Jane	United Kingdom	The ship was driven ashore near Gilleleje, Denmark. She was refloated the next day and taken into Helsingør.
Maitland	United Kingdom	The ship was wrecked on Brownie's Island Reef, in the Atlantic Ocean off the coast of Maine, United States. She was on a voyage from Liverpool, Lancashire to Saint John, New Brunswick, British North America.
Psyche	United Kingdom	The ship was driven ashore at Grangemouth, Stirlingshire.

== Unknown date ==
List of shipwrecks: Unknown date in March 1840
Ship	State	Description
Agnes	United Kingdom	The ship was driven ashore in the Dry Tortugas. She was on a voyage from New Orleans, Louisiana, United States to London. Agneswas refloated and taken into Key Wet, Florida Territory.
Armistad	United Kingdom	The brig foundered in the North Sea off the coast of Northumberland on or before 4 March.
Belmont	United Kingdom	The ship ran aground on the Carysfort Reef and was severely damaged. She was on a voyage from Montego Bay, Jamaica to Liverpool, Lancashire. Belmont was refloated and taken into Key West, where she was condemned.
Escambia	United States	The ship foundered in the Atlantic Ocean with the loss of eleven lives. She was on a voyage from Charleston, South Carolina to New York.
Flora	(United Kingdom of Great Britain and Ireland) British North America	The ship was wrecked on the Frying Pan Shoal, in the Atlantic Ocean off the coast of the United States. She was on a voyage from Saint John, New Brunswick to Savannah, Georgia, United States.
Formigula	United Kingdom	The schooner was driven ashore and wrecked near Collo, Algeria with the loss of all but two of her crew.
Fortuna	Spain	The ship ran aground of the Jardanelloes. She was on a voyage from Cádiz to Havana, Cuba. Fortuna was refloated with assistance from HMS Racer (Royal Navy). She arrived at Havana on 11 March.
Ida	United States	The fishing schooner was lost on the Georges Bank. Lost with all 6 hands.
Isabella	United Kingdom	The ship was wrecked near Tetuan, Morocco with the loss of two of her crew. She was on a voyage from Newcastle upon Tyne, Northumberland to Malta.
Mitchell	United States	The ship was abandoned in the Atlantic Ocean before 23 March.
Samuel	United Kingdom	The ship departed from Hamburg for Saint John's, Newfoundland, British North America. No further trace, presumed foundered with the loss of all hands.
Success	United Kingdom	The brig was driven ashore at Redcar, Yorkshire. Her crew were rescued.
Victoria	United Kingdom	The brig was abandoned in the Atlantic Ocean before 19 March.
HMS Zebra	Royal Navy	The Cruizer-class brig-sloop was driven ashore and damaged at "Cape Blanco". She was refloated and put into Malta, where she had arrived by 5 April.
