= Sharnal Street railway station =

Disused railway station in Kent, England

Coordinates: 51°26′22″N 0°34′25″E

Sharnal Street
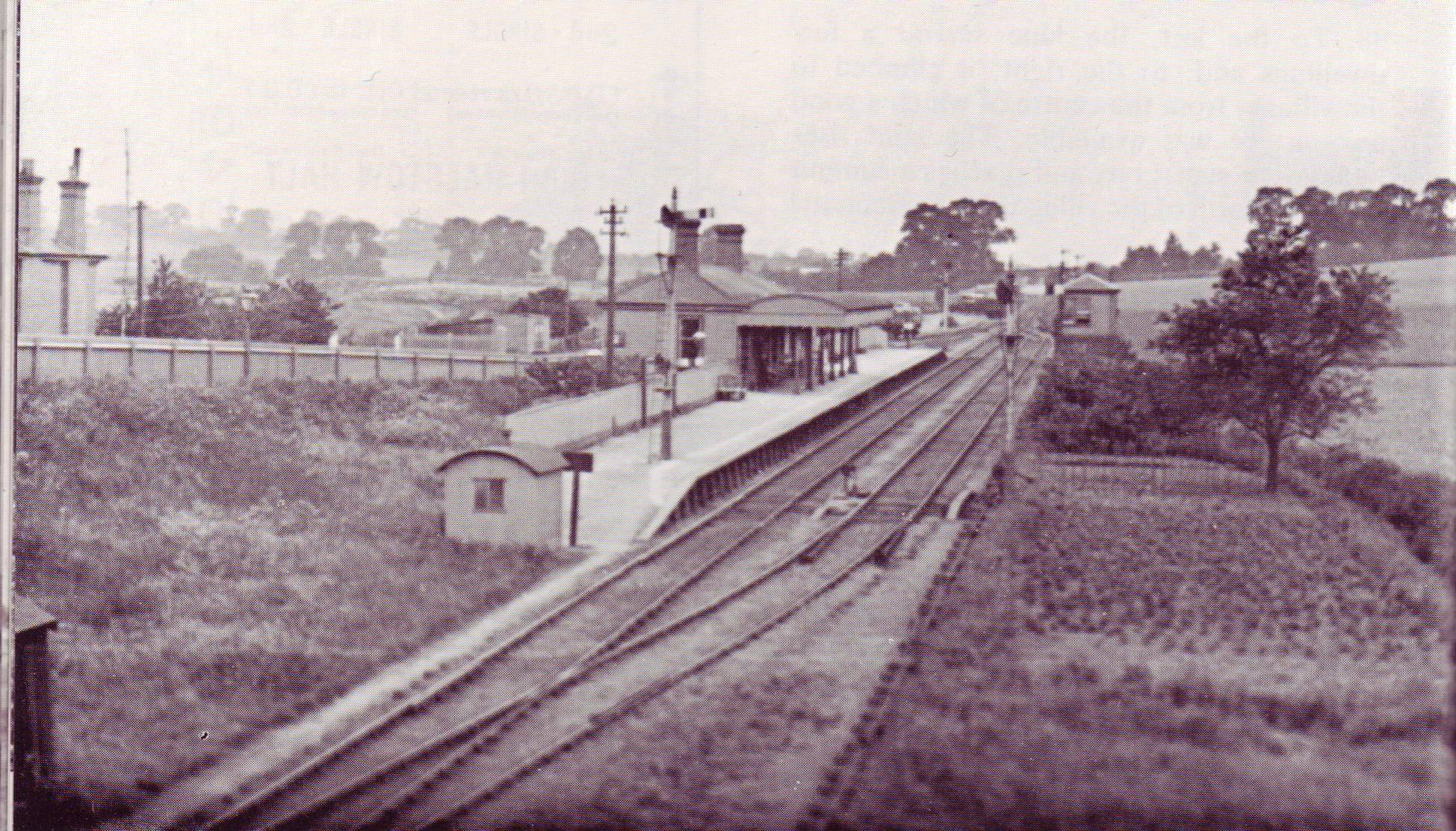

General information
- Location: Sharnal Street, Medway; England
- Grid reference: TQ788743
- Platforms: 1, later 2

Other information
- Status: Disused

History
- Pre-grouping: South Eastern Railway
- Post-grouping: Southern Railway; Southern Region of British Railways

Key dates
- 1 April 1882: Opened
- 4 December 1961: Closed to passengers
- 20 August 1962: Closed
Location

Sharnal Street station was a railway station between High Halstow Halt and Beluncle Halt on the Hundred of Hoo Railway.

== Original station ==
It was opened on 1 April 1882 and closed to passengers on 4 December 1961 and freight on 20 August 1962. It originally only had one platform, a second platform was built in 1935. The station buildings were demolished in 1967.

== Proposed new station ==
Medway Council have proposed a new station at Sharnal Street to serve residential development on the Hoo Peninsula. The council has secured funding from the Housing Infrastructure Fund for the station and a link road.

Preceding station	Disused railways	Following station
Cliffe	1-8-1882 to 10-9-1882; SER; Hundred of Hoo Railway	Terminus
Cliffe	11-9-1882 to 31-12-1898; SER; Hundred of Hoo Railway	Port Victoria
Cliffe	1-1-1899 to 6/1906; SECR; Hundred of Hoo Railway	Terminus
High Halstow Halt	7/1906 to 31-12-1922; SECR; Hundred of Hoo Railway	Beluncle Halt
High Halstow Halt	1-1-1923 to 31-12-1947; SR; Hundred of Hoo Railway	Beluncle Halt
High Halstow Halt	1-1-1948 to 3-12-1961; BR(S); Hundred of Hoo Railway	Beluncle Halt
