= High Halstow Halt railway station =

Disused railway station in Kent, England

Coordinates: 51.447005°N 0.553917°E

High Halstow Halt
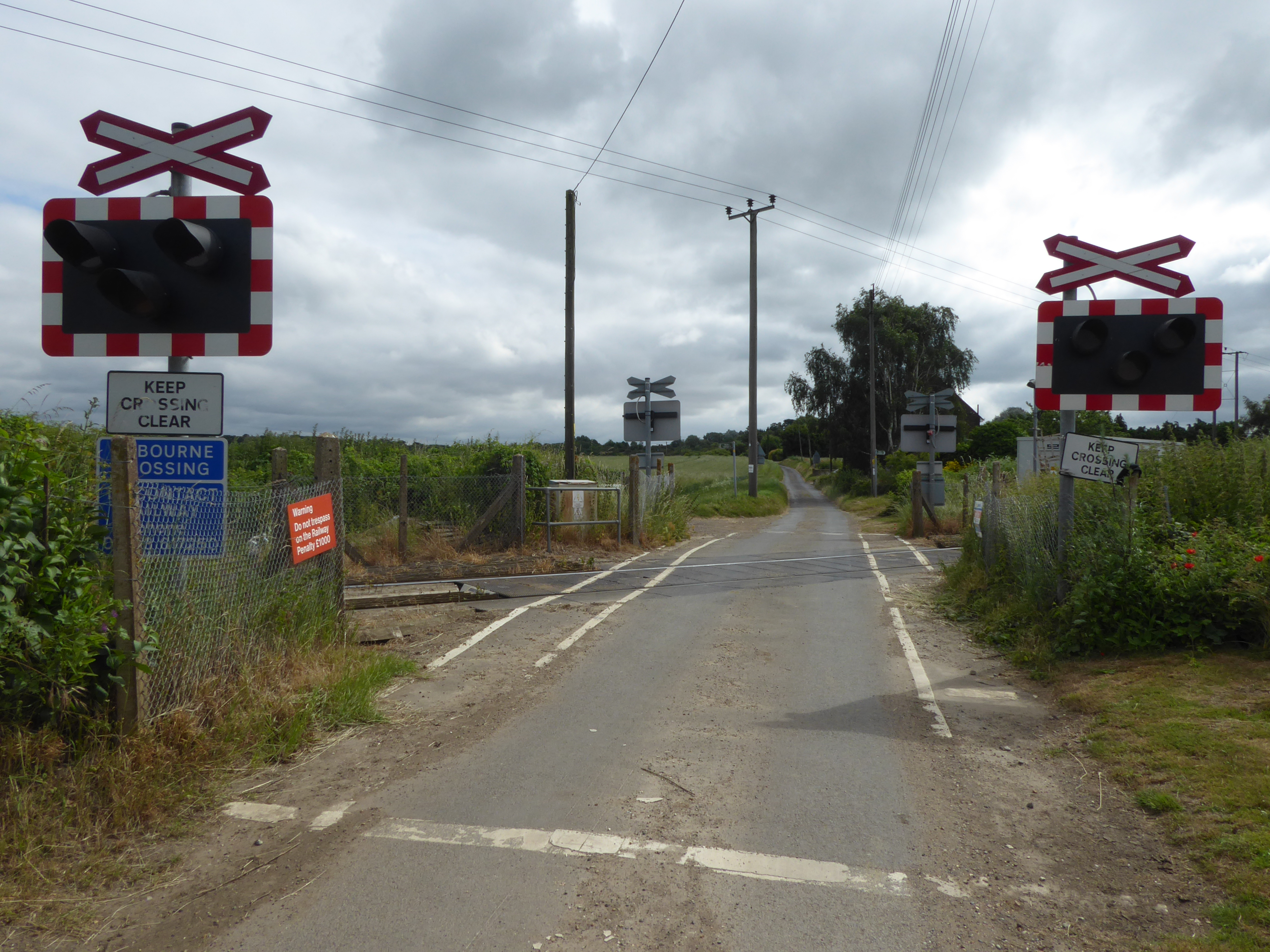
- The site of the station in 2018

General information
- Location: High Halstow, Medway; England
- Grid reference: TQ774751
- Platforms: 1,

Other information
- Status: Disused

History
- Pre-grouping: South Eastern & Chatham Railway
- Post-grouping: Southern Railway; Southern Region of British Railways

Key dates
- July 1906: Opened
- 4 December 1961: Closed
Location

High Halstow Halt was a halt between Cliffe and Sharnal Street stations on the Hundred of Hoo Railway. It was opened in July 1906 and closed to passengers on 4 December 1961. The halt was 1¾ miles from Cliffe station.

Preceding station	Disused railways	Following station
Cliffe	7/1906 to 31-12-1922; SECR; Hundred of Hoo Railway	Sharnal Street
Cliffe	1-1-1923 to 31-12-1947; SR; Hundred of Hoo Railway	Sharnal Street
Cliffe	1-1-1948 to 3-12-1961; BR(S); Hundred of Hoo Railway	Sharnal Street

== Sources ==
- Kidner, R. W. (1985). Southern Railway Halts. Survey and Gazetteer. Headington, Oxford: The Oakwood Press. ISBN 0-85361-321-4.
