= Listed buildings in Stoke, Kent =

Civil Parish in Kent, England

Stoke is a village and civil parish in the unitary authority of Medway in Kent, England. It contains one grade I, one grade II* and three grade II listed buildings that are recorded in the National Heritage List for England.

This list is based on the information retrieved online from Historic England.

== Key ==
Grade	Criteria
I	Buildings that are of exceptional interest
II*	Particularly important buildings of more than special interest
II	Buildings that are of special interest

== Listing ==
Name	Grade	Location	Type	Completed (Note: The date given is the date used by Historic England as significant for the initial building or that of an important part in the structure's description.)	Date designated	Grid ref. (Note: The grid reference is based on the British national grid reference system, sometimes known as OSGB36, used by the Ordnance Survey.) Geo-coordinates	Notes	Entry number (Note: The "List Entry Number" is a unique number assigned to each listed building and scheduled monument by Historic England.)	Image	Wikidata
Church of St Peter and St Paul	I				21 November 1966	TQ8234275073; 51°26′43″N 0°37′21″E		1204545	Church of St Peter and St Paul More images	Q17533360
Court Lodge Farm House	II				14 November 1986	TQ8226375233; 51°26′48″N 0°37′17″E		1086503	Upload Photo	Q26377434
Granary 20 Yards to North of Court Lodge Farm House	II				14 November 1986	TQ8226075269; 51°26′49″N 0°37′17″E		1204550	Upload Photo	Q26499984
Mackay's Court	II	High Street, Lower Stoke			21 November 1966	TQ8306975684; 51°27′02″N 0°38′00″E		1336099	Upload Photo	Q26620623
South View	II	High Street, Lower Stoke			14 November 1986	TQ8315675993; 51°27′12″N 0°38′05″E		1281137	Upload Photo	Q26570208

== See also ==
- Grade I listed buildings in Kent
- Grade II* listed buildings in Kent

== Sources ==
- Newman, John (2012) [1969], Kent: West and the Weald, The Buildings of England, New Haven and London: Yale University Press, ISBN 978-0-300-18509-6
