= Allhallows-on-Sea railway station =

Disused railway station in Medway, Kent

Coordinates: 51.47234°N 0.65417°E

Allhallows-on-Sea
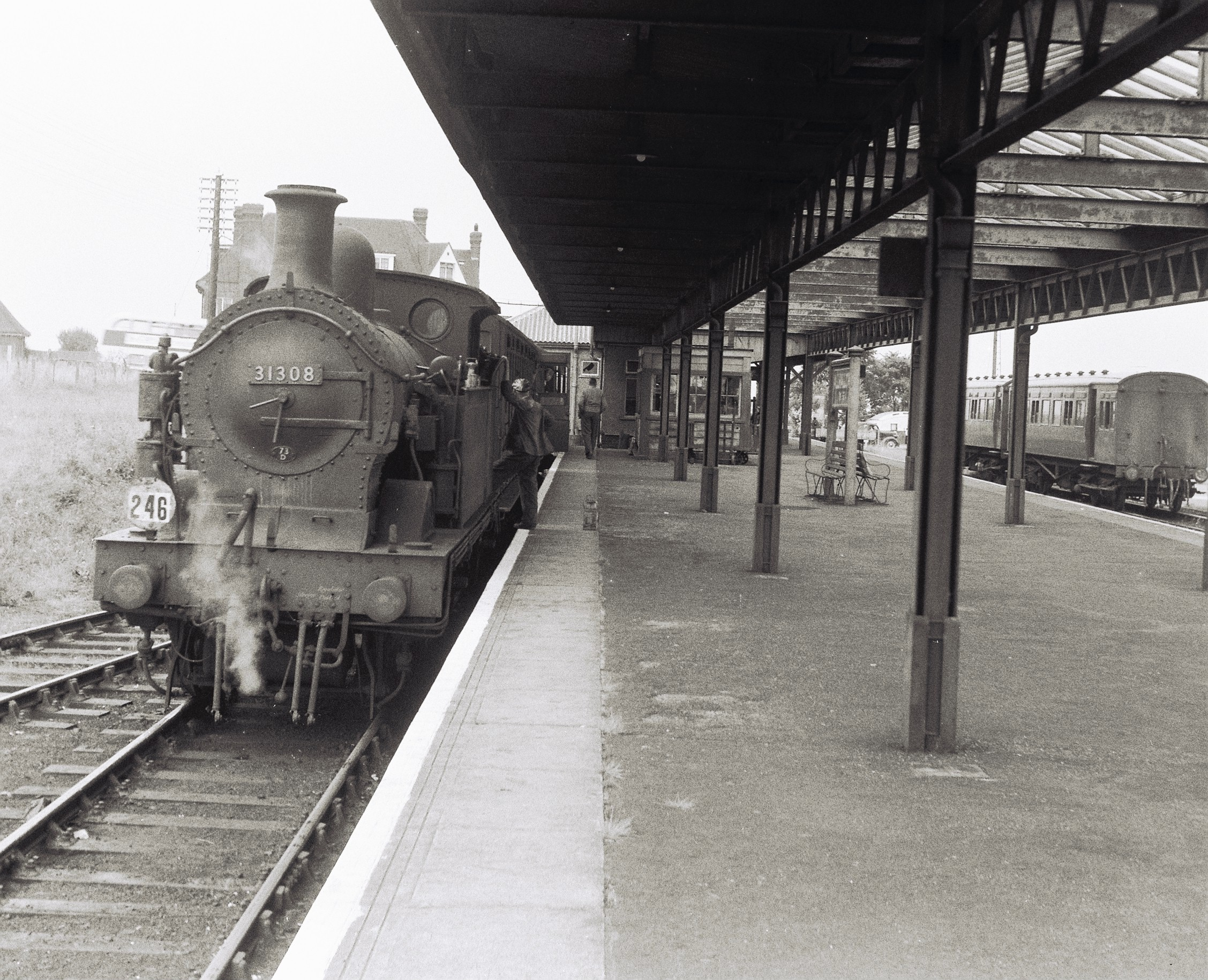
- SECR H Class at station in 1958.

General information
- Location: Allhallows-on-Sea, Medway; England
- Grid reference: TQ844783
- Platforms: 2

Other information
- Status: Disused

History
- Post-grouping: Southern Railway; Southern Region of British Railways

Key dates
- 16 May 1932: Opened
- 4 December 1961: Closed
Location

Allhallows-on-Sea station was the railway station for Allhallows-on-Sea, Kent from 1932 to 1961.

It was opened partly on the 14 and fully on 16 May 1932. It had an island platform with a run-round loop. Originally the branch from Stoke Junction was single track, but it was doubled in 1935, and singled again in 1957.

The station closed on 4 December 1961 and was demolished in 1975, although the listed water tank remains.

== History ==
Opened by the Southern Railway the line passed on to the Southern Region of British Railways on nationalisation in 1948 and was then closed by the British Transport Commission.

Preceding station	Disused railways	Following station
Middle Stoke Halt	16-5-1932 to 15-7-1932; SR; Hundred of Hoo Railway	Terminus
Stoke Junction Halt	16-7-1932 to 31-12-1947; SR; Hundred of Hoo Railway	Terminus
Stoke Junction Halt	1-1-1948 to 3-12-1961; BR(S); Hundred of Hoo Railway	Terminus
