= Allhallows, Kent =

Village and civil parish in Kent, England

Coordinates: 51.4735°N 0.6562°E

Allhallows
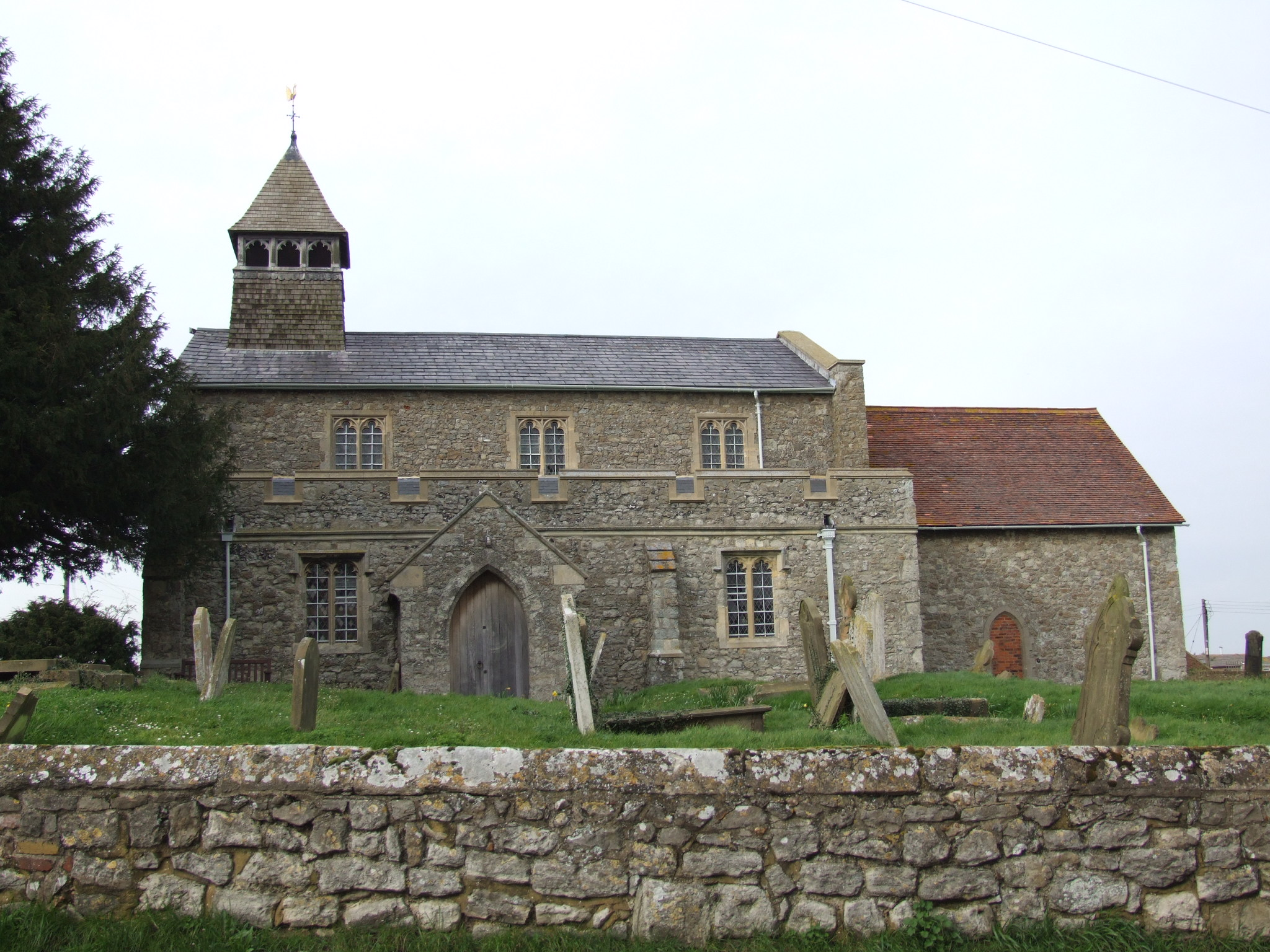

- Location within Kent
- Population: 1,676 (2011)
- OS grid reference: TQ844783
- Civil parish: Allhallows
- Unitary authority: Medway
- Ceremonial county: Kent
- Region: South East
- Country: England
- Sovereign state: United Kingdom
- Post town: ROCHESTER
- Postcode district: ME3
- Dialling code: 01634
- Police: Kent
- Fire: Kent
- Ambulance: South East Coast
- UK Parliament: Rochester and Strood

Allhallows is a village and civil parish on the Hoo Peninsula in Rochester Kent, England. Situated in the northernmost part of Kent, and covering an area of 23.99 km^{2}, the parish is bounded on the north side by the River Thames, and in the east by the course of Yantlet creek, now silted up. At the 2011 census the parish had a population of 1,676.

Allhallows village is in two parts: the ancient Hoo All Hallows and the 20th century holiday colony Allhallows-on-Sea.

To the west of the village is Windhill Green. There used to be a hamlet on the site, but all the original buildings have been demolished. It survives only as a placename.

== Hoo All Hallows ==
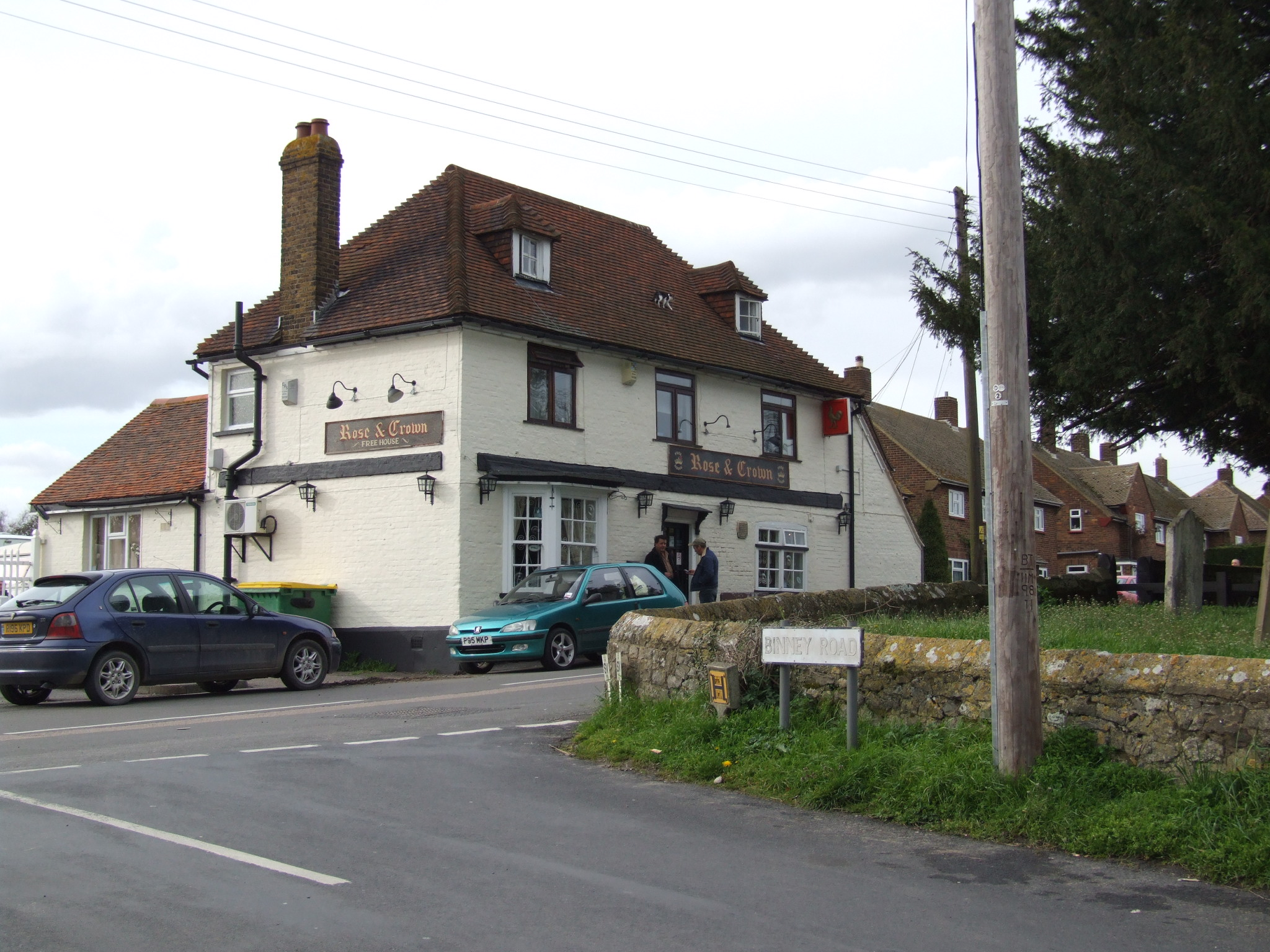
Hoo All Hallows

Hoo All Hallows is clustered round the parish church of All Saints, from which the village takes its name: Hallow meaning Saint. The Hoo (in 1285 written Ho) refers to a spur of land, and is thus a common element of place names on the spur or peninsula. Hoo All Hallows' parish registers date from 1629, and in 1841 the population was recorded as 268 people.

All Saints' Church itself dates from the 12th century. It is the only Grade I listed building on the Hoo Peninsula and is built of flint and stone with a lead roof. It has a west tower, north and south porches to the nave, and a chancel. The earliest part is the west end of the nave, followed by the south arcade. The north arcade dates from the early 13th century, while the chancel arch and screen are 14th century. Money was left in 1472 "to the werkes of the body of the church", possibly to the nave. The chancel was heavily restored in 1886–91.

A branch of the Pympe family lived on an estate with a mansion known as "Allhallows House".

Yantlet Creek was once part of a navigable and fortified trade route, used from Roman times. The Saxon Shore Way passes close by the old boundaries, indicating silting over many centuries.

=== Avery Farm ===
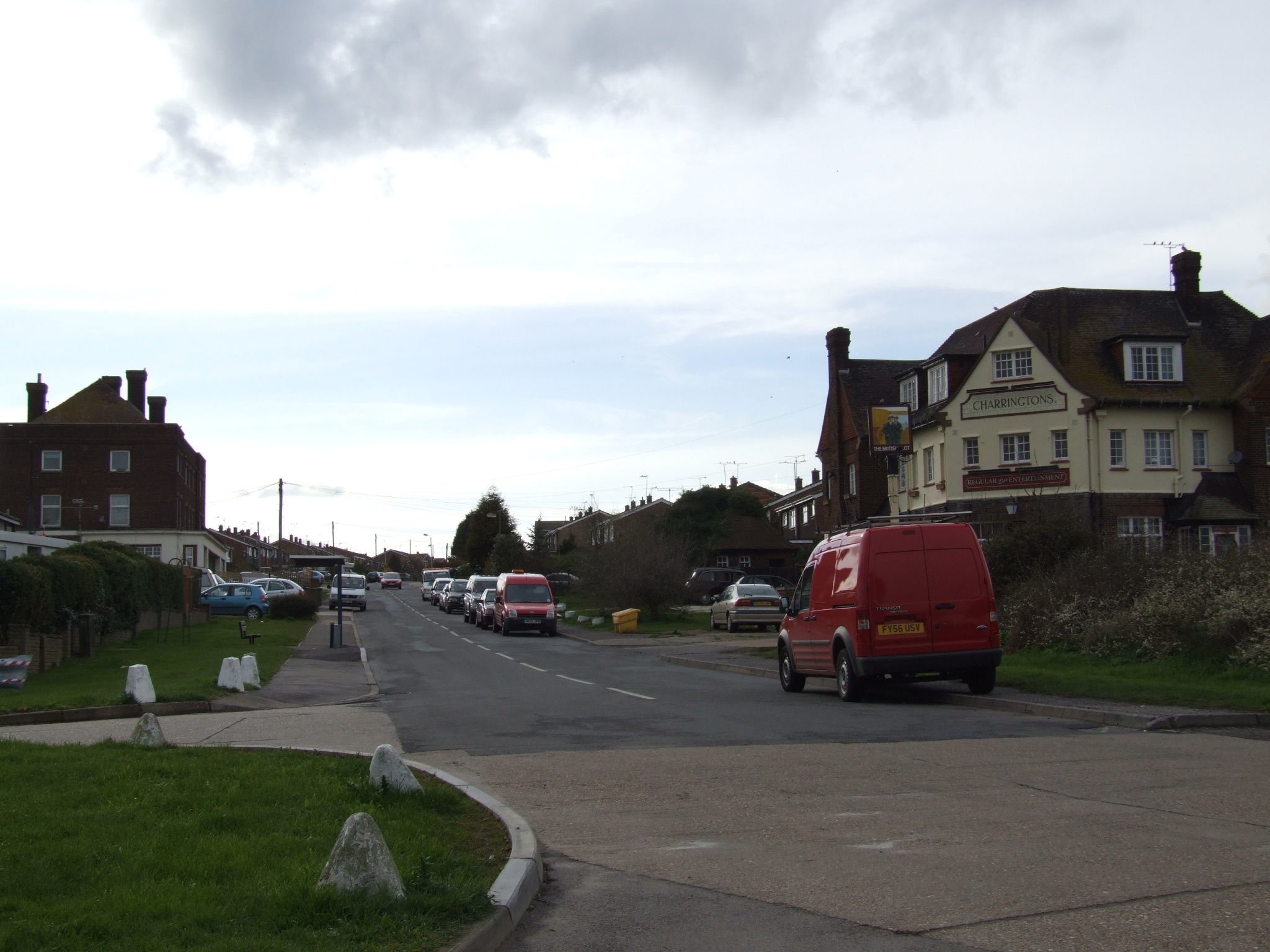
The British Pilot, at the end of Avery Way

Avery Farm is on the tip of a promontory, which, in Anglo-Saxon times, is believed to have been an island in its own right, belonging to a woman named "Heahburh". It is thought she may have been an abbess, given that lands named after her were granted by the 7th century King Cædwalla of Wessex to the monastery at Medeshamstede, now known as Peterborough, presumably together with Hoo St Werburgh.

== Allhallows-on-Sea ==
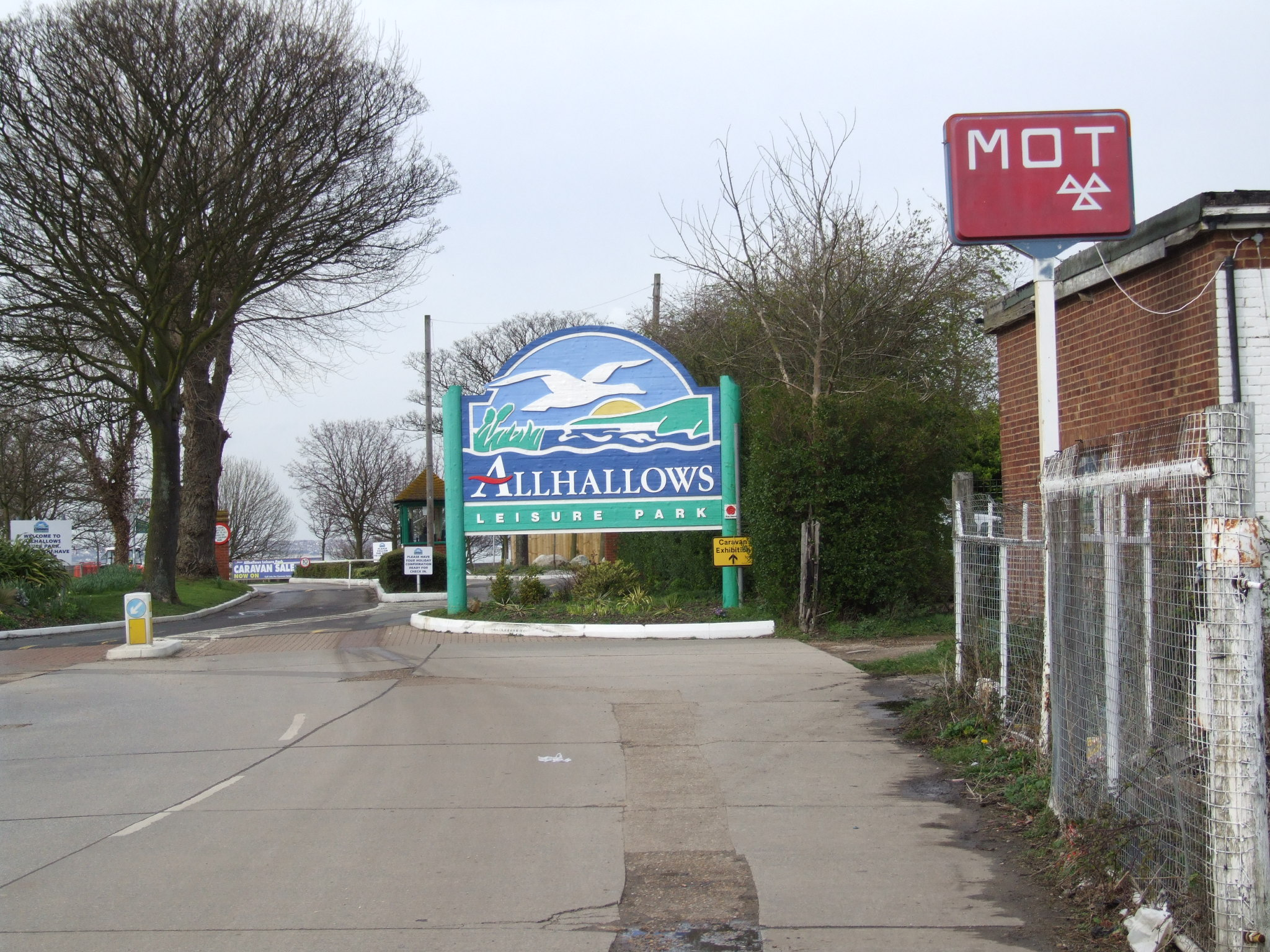
The entrance to the holiday park.

The modern holiday village of Allhallows-on-Sea lies on the river front about a 1 km north of the ancient village.

After the First World War, Kent and London county councils proposed to transform Allhallows into a major seaside resort, after the fashion of Victorian Herne Bay.

On 13 February 1937, the Gravesend Reporter carried the following:

"During the next month the Amusement Park will be started with a building of 60,000 square feet (5,600 m^{2}).

When completed the park will be four times the size of the famous one at Blackpool. Other features include: zoological gardens, yachting centre, physical training stadium, the largest swimming pool in the country with artificial waves, holiday camp and 5,000 houses, up to date hotels, restaurants, theatres and cinemas. The development, which will take some seven years to complete is costing millions of pounds, and when finished, the town covering something like two and half square miles of land, should prove to be of great convenience to the millions of Londoners, and others."

In the 1930s, the Southern Railway, opened a short branch from the Hundred of Hoo Railway branch line to Grain. The terminus, Allhallows-on-Sea railway station, opened on 15 May 1932, was north of the old village, and the new part of the settlement grew up around the station. However, the planned development never took place, partly because of the onset of the Second World War, and the railway station closed on to 4 December 1961.

There is now a holiday park that includes a 9-hole golf course, fresh water fishing lake, and a small entertainments complex with both indoor and outdoor pool. This park is operated by Haven Holidays, owned by Bourne Leisure Ltd.

A large 1930s style pub, the British Pilot, was built, superseding the village inn, the Rose and Crown Tavern, now a dwelling. This pub was itself closed in 2021.

== Allhallows in the war ==
On the morning of 15 October 1940, a Royal Air Force Squadron was involved in combat over the River Medway, and during a skirmish with a Messerschmitt Bf 109, the Spitfire R6642 was damaged by enemy fire, forcing Pilot Officer J. W. Lund to bail out. The aircraft crashed on the shoreline of the River Medway near Allhallows at 11:50 am. The pilot was rescued by the Navy, but his aircraft remained a wreck on the tidal mudflats of Allhallows until the summer of 1998 when the site was excavated.

== Future proposals ==
Proposals made by Lord Foster in November 2011 to expand the transport system of south east England, called the Thames Hub, planned a new river barrier and road crossing and a shipping and rail complex. The most controversial part of the scheme involved remodelling the Thames Estuary, by constructing a Thames Hub Airport on the neighbouring Isle of Grain, partially on land reclaimed from the estuary but including land at Allhallows and Lower Stoke. While the road crossing is still progressing, the other proposals have been shelved, with the airport plan abandoned in July 2015 on the recommendation of the Airports Commission.

== See also ==
- Listed buildings in Allhallows, Kent
