= Listed buildings in Allhallows, Kent =

Civil Parish in Kent, England

Allhallows is a village and civil parish in the unitary authority of Medway in Kent, England. It contains one grade I, one grade II* and three grade II listed buildings that are recorded in the National Heritage List for England.

This list is based on the information retrieved online from Historic England.

== Key ==
Grade	Criteria
I	Buildings that are of exceptional interest
II*	Particularly important buildings of more than special interest
II	Buildings that are of special interest

== Listing ==
Name	Grade	Location	Type	Completed (Note: The date given is the date used by Historic England as significant for the initial building or that of an important part in the structure's description.)	Date designated	Grid ref. (Note: The grid reference is based on the British national grid reference system, sometimes known as OSGB36, used by the Ordnance Survey.) Geo-coordinates	Notes	Entry number (Note: The "List Entry Number" is a unique number assigned to each listed building and scheduled monument by Historic England.)	Image	Wikidata
Slough Fort	II*				12 November 2009	TQ8377178519; 51°28′33″N 0°38′41″E		1393526	Slough Fort More images	Q7541480
Church of All Saints	I	High Street			21 November 1966	TQ8359777547; 51°28′02″N 0°38′31″E		1085758	Church of All Saints More images	Q17533118
Barn 25 Yards South of Brickhouse Farmhouse	II	Ratcliffe Highway			14 November 1986	TQ8217977195; 51°27′52″N 0°37′17″E		1085759	Upload Photo	Q26374172
Brickhouse Farmhouse	II	Ratcliffe Highway			21 November 1966	TQ8221677253; 51°27′54″N 0°37′19″E		1336498	Upload Photo	Q26620986
Rose and Crown Public House	II	Stoke Road			20 December 1989	TQ8356677539; 51°28′01″N 0°38′29″E		1086504	Upload Photo	Q26377438

== See also ==
- Grade I listed buildings in Kent
- Grade II* listed buildings in Kent

== Sources ==
- Newman, John (2012) [1969], Kent: West and the Weald, The Buildings of England, New Haven and London: Yale University Press, ISBN 978-0-300-18509-6
