= Grain railway station =

Disused railway station in Kent, England

Grain
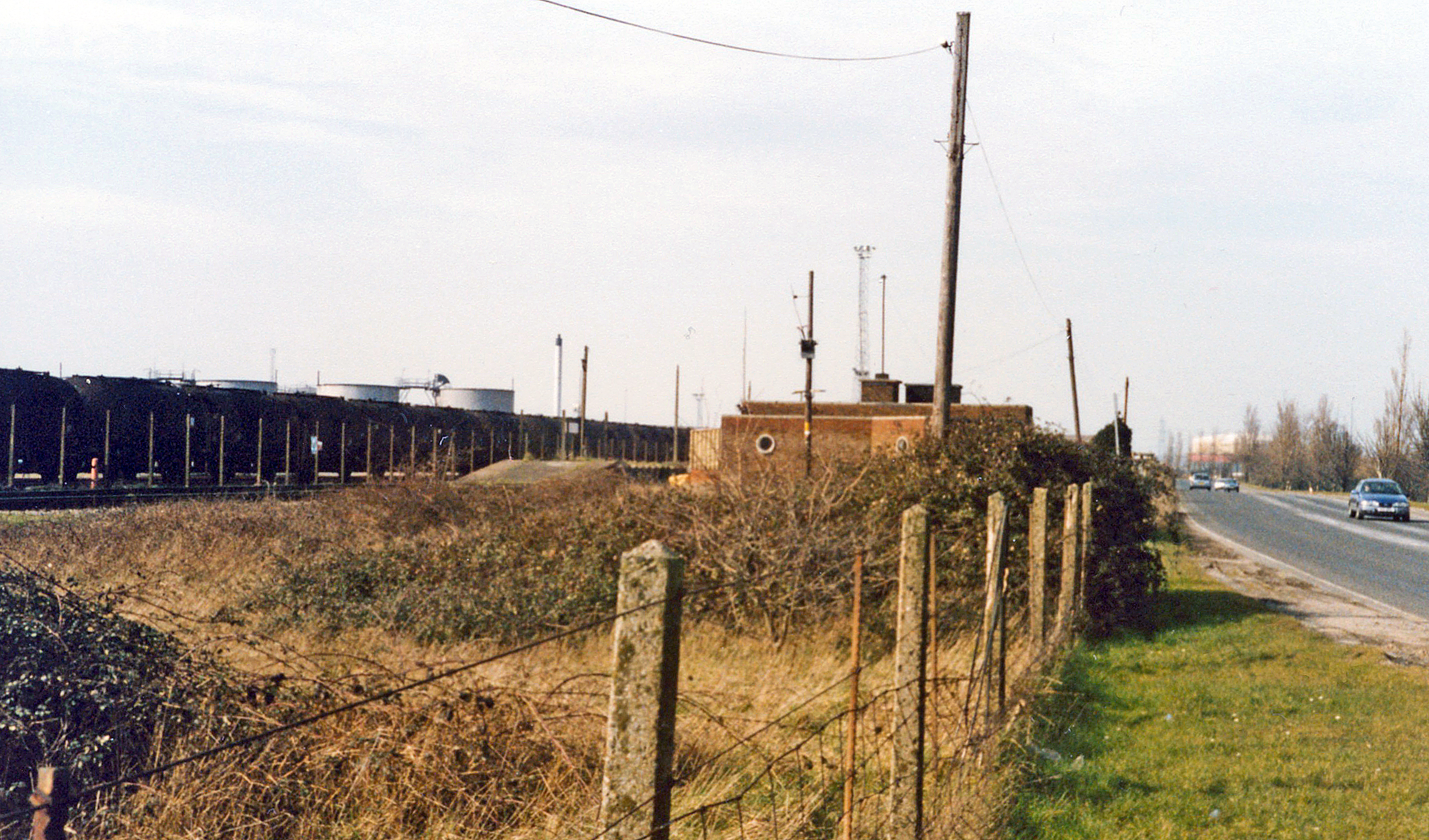
- The site of the station in 1995

General information
- Location: Grain, Medway; England
- Grid reference: TQ869750
- Platforms: 2

Other information
- Status: Disused

History
- Post-grouping: British Railways, Southern Region

Key dates
- 3 September 1951: Opened
- 4 December 1961: Closed
Location

Grain station (TQ 869 750 51°26′38″N 0°41′04″E) was a railway station on the Hundred of Hoo Railway, England. It opened on 3 September 1951, replacing Grain Crossing Halt, and closed on 4 December 1961. It was located between Grain Crossing Halt and Port Victoria stations.

Preceding station	Disused railways	Following station
Stoke Junction Halt	British Railways, Southern Region; Hundred of Hoo Railway	Terminus for passenger service.
