= Port Victoria railway station =

Disused railway station in Kent, England

Port Victoria
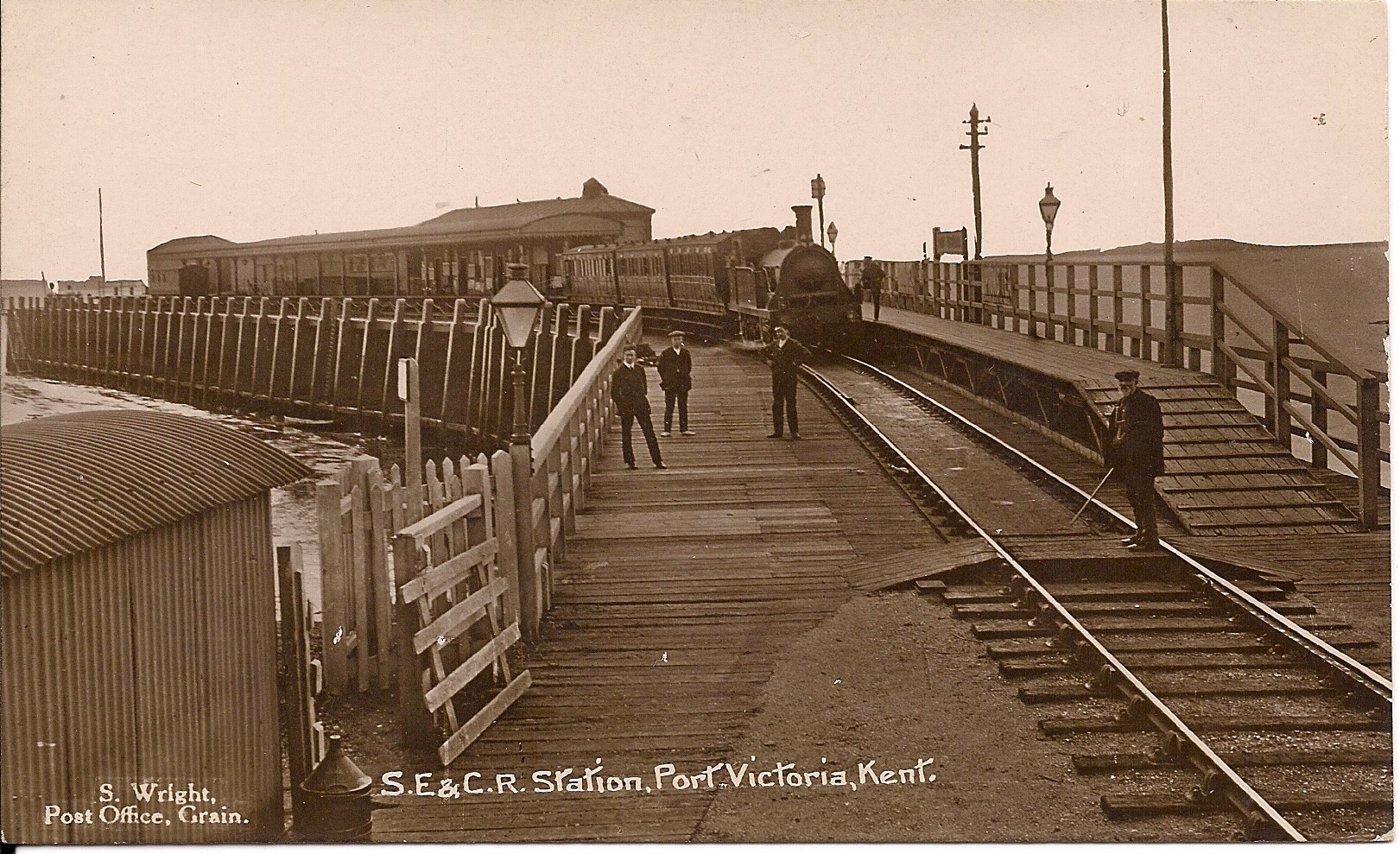

General information
- Location: Port Victoria, Medway; England
- Coordinates: 51.4320°N 0.7027°E
- Grid reference: TQ878738
- Platforms: 1

Other information
- Status: Disused

History
- Original company: South Eastern Railway
- Pre-grouping: South Eastern and Chatham Railway
- Post-grouping: Southern Railway

Key dates
- 11 September 1882: Opened
- 1931: resited
- 11 June 1951: Closed
Location

Port Victoria railway station is a disused station in Kent, United Kingdom, which opened on 11 September 1882 and closed in 1951. It was located at the head of a 400-foot (120 m) long timber pier reaching in the River Medway estuary.

The pier was discovered to be in need of repairs in 1896, and had also been damaged by a storm in November of that year. Between 1900 and 1903, the station was heavily used, as owing to a fire Queenborough pier was unavailable for use. During World War I the Admiralty took over Port Victoria. In 1916, the railway along the pier was shortened to 93 feet (28 m) and a new station building provided, the old one being demolished. By 1931 further deterioration of the pier made it unsafe and a new station was built on the landward side. The train service by this time being just two passenger services per day. In 1941 the pier was demolished and the station closed on 11 June 1951. The station featured in two Pathé News films recorded in 1939 and 1947, both featuring Station Master Stephen Mills.

Preceding station	Disused railways	Following station
Sharnal Street	1882-01-11 to 1898-12-31; SER; Hundred of Hoo Railway	Terminus
Sharnal Street	1899-01-01 to 1906-06-30; SECR; Hundred of Hoo Railway	Terminus
Grain Crossing Halt	1906-07-01 to 1922-12-31; SECR; Hundred of Hoo Railway	Terminus
Grain Crossing Halt	1923-01-01 to 1947-12-31; SR; Hundred of Hoo Railway	Terminus
Grain Crossing Halt	1948-01-01 to 1951-06-10; BR(S); Hundred of Hoo Railway	Terminus
