= Cliffe railway station =

Disused railway station in Kent, England

Cliffe
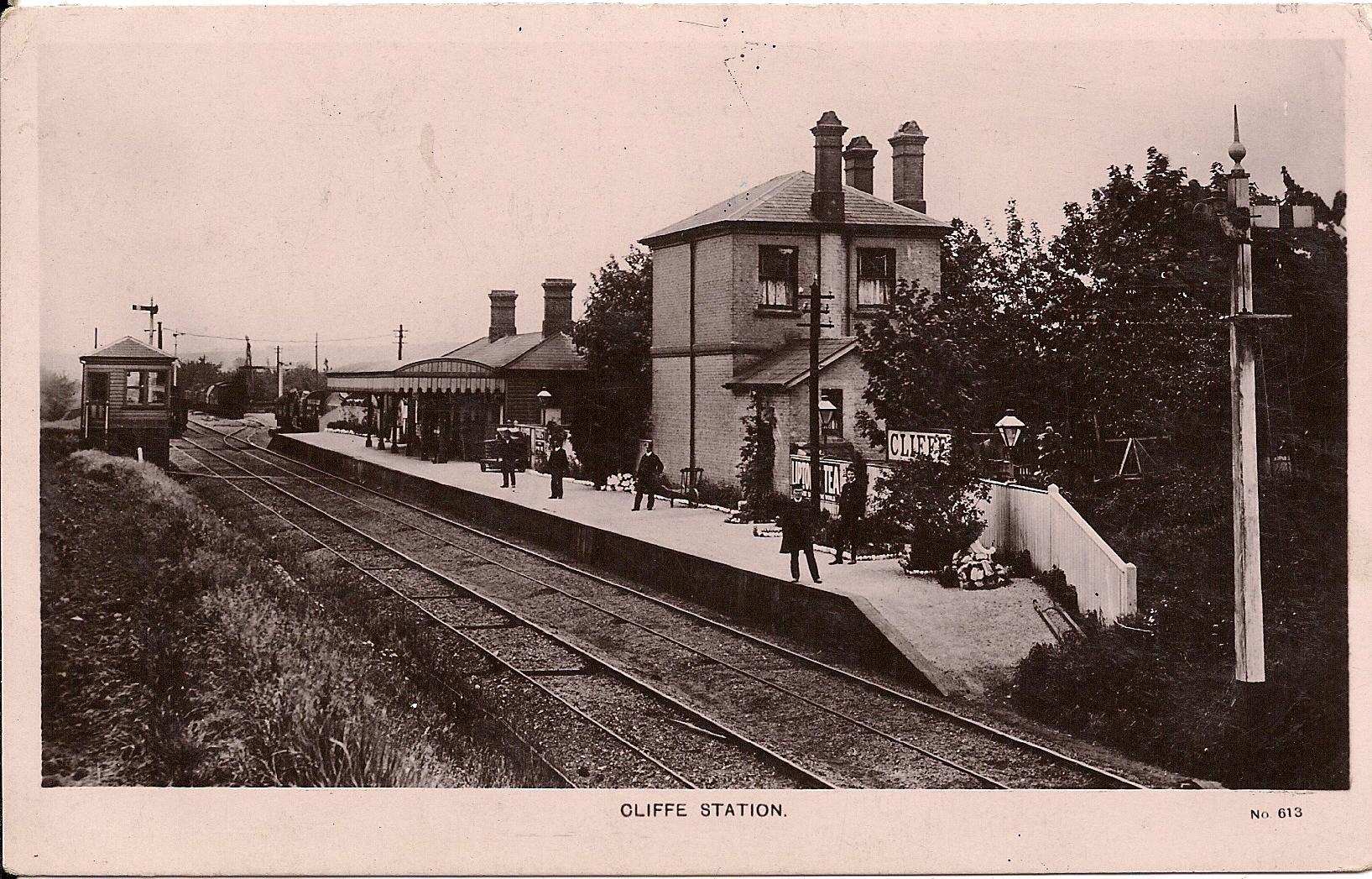

General information
- Location: Cliffe, Medway; England
- Coordinates: 51.4453°N 0.4983°E
- Grid reference: TQ738748
- Platforms: 1, later 2

Other information
- Status: Disused

History
- Pre-grouping: South Eastern Railway (UK)
- Post-grouping: Southern Railway; Southern Region of British Railways

Key dates
- 1 April 1882: Opened
- 4 December 1961: Closed to passengers
- 20 August 1962: Closed to freight
Location

Cliffe (TQ 738 748 51°26′44″N 0°30′07″E) was a railway station between Uralite Halt and High Halstow Halt on the Hundred of Hoo Railway in Kent, England. It was opened on 1 April 1882 and closed to passengers on 4 December 1961 and freight on 20 August 1962. It originally only had one platform, a second platform was built in 1935. The station was demolished soon after closure although one track through the station site remains and still carries freight traffic.

Preceding station	Disused railways	Following station
Uralite Halt	7/1907 to 31-12-1922; SECR; Hundred of Hoo Railway	High Halstow Halt
Uralite Halt	1-1-1923 to 31-12-1948; SR; Hundred of Hoo Railway	High Halstow Halt
Uralite Halt	1-1-1948 to 3-12-1961; BR(S); Hundred of Hoo Railway	High Halstow Halt
