= Yantlet =

British creek

Coordinates: 51.470605°N 0.670956°E

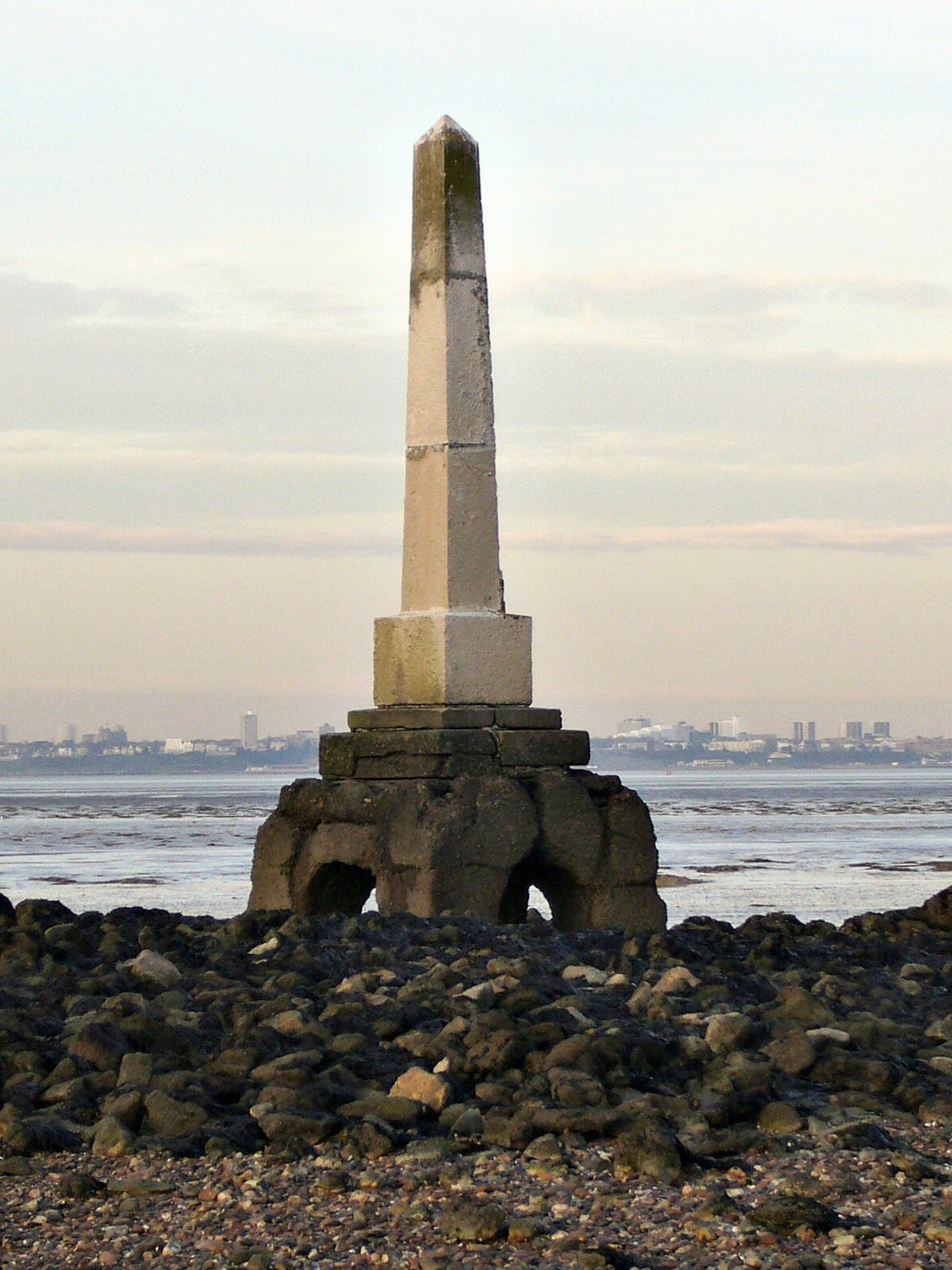
The London Stone, the Yantlet Channel and the Essex bank

Yantlet Creek is the creek draining into the River Thames that separated the Isle of Grain from the Hoo peninsula. It once connected the River Medway with the River Thames and made the Isle of Grain a true island. The creek silted up and now drains the area of The Isle of Grain and Allhallows Marshes. A monument known as the London Stone is located at its mouth and marks the limit of the City of London's ownership of the Thames.

Yantlet gives its name to the Yantlet Reach on the Thames, and in its time has been used as point where the river became the estuary.

The Yantlet Creek area is designated a special landscape area in the Medway Local Plan. It is also part of the South Thames Estuary and Marshes special protection area (SPA), and within the Natural Area of the Greater Thames Estuary and Site of Special Scientific Interest (SSSI).

== History ==
In mediaeval times the Yantlet Creek (on the Thames) and Colemouth Creek (on the Medway) once formed a single watercourse, separating the Isle of Grain from the rest of the Hoo peninsula and providing a shipping channel from the Thames to the Medway under the conservancy of the City of London. It was the preferred way for Medway boatmen to reach the London River, being shorter and less hazardous than passing by Queenborough.

A substantial single arch stone bridge, known as Grain Bridge, crossed the creek at a point on the line of the present day A228. It allowed both the passage of boats along the creek, and the passage of road traffic over to Isle of Grain village. The tides from the Thames and the Medway came together at the bridge. The bridge which may have been of Saxon or Norman origin some time prior to 1760. It was replaced by a causeway which at first may have been more like a ford at low tide, forming a spitway at high tide. Over decade the channel silted up. Whether the blockage caused by collapse of the bridge caused the silting, or neglect as the channel needed to be dredged has not been established. Over sixty years the causeway was raised, built over the creek and the locals saw Colemouth and Yantlets as separate waterways. The City of London remembered this as a single waterway over which it had rights of navigation.

The City of London re-established the navigation in 1822, by digging a 0.5 miles (0.80 km) cut, and severing the causeway. This was taken to the high court in 1824 for resolution. The judgement was inconclusive. The causeway at Grain Bridge was reestablished and the road reinstated by 1835, and the City of London effectively gave up claims to it. The natural processes of silting up and narrowing continue to the present day (2018).

Prior to the twentieth century, the creek was used for salt workings, fishing and oyster beds. Flounders, eels, herrings and lobster were all caught in the creek. The mouth of Yantlet Creek, protected by a sand-bar, could shelter 50 boats from a moderate storm.

== Yantlet Line ==
London Stone by Yantlet Creek is paired with the Crow Stone in Southend-on-Sea. Together the two stones mark a north–south line across the Thames Estuary known as the Yantlet Line. They are both 54 kilometres (34 mi) from London Bridge. The Medway stone carries the inscription “God Preserve the City of London” The Yantlet Line marked the limit of jurisdiction of City of London and still marks that of the Port of London Authority (PLA).

== Yantlet Range ==
In 1917, towards the end of the First World War, the Admiralty requisitioned marshland to the east of Yantlet Creek, and in the 1920s the War Office built a firing point for testing large weapons. The ‘Grain Island Firing Point’ or 'The Yantlet Battery'. The firing point was an ‘out’ battery of the experimental establishment at Shoeburyness. It was used for firing long-range shells in a north-easterly direction across the estuary into shallow mudflats of the Maplin Sands.

Facilities included two pairs of large velocity screen masts, an internal railway linked to the national network, a gun emplacement, a railway gun emplacement, domestic quarters and administrative offices, a gantry path for travelling crane and a wharf on Yantlet Creek for the unloading and loading of large guns and their mountings.

The firing point is further distinguished by the length of the range of which it was a part and the size of the guns that were tested there.

== See also ==
Wantsum Channel
