= Stoke, Kent =

Civil parish in Kent, England

Coordinates: 51.450°N 0.631°E

Stoke
- Location within Kent
- Population: 1,060 (2011)
- OS grid reference: TQ831760
- Civil parish: Stoke
- Unitary authority: Medway
- Ceremonial county: Kent
- Region: South East
- Country: England
- Sovereign state: United Kingdom
- Post town: ROCHESTER
- Postcode district: ME3
- Dialling code: 01634
- Police: Kent
- Fire: Kent
- Ambulance: South East Coast
- UK Parliament: Rochester and Strood

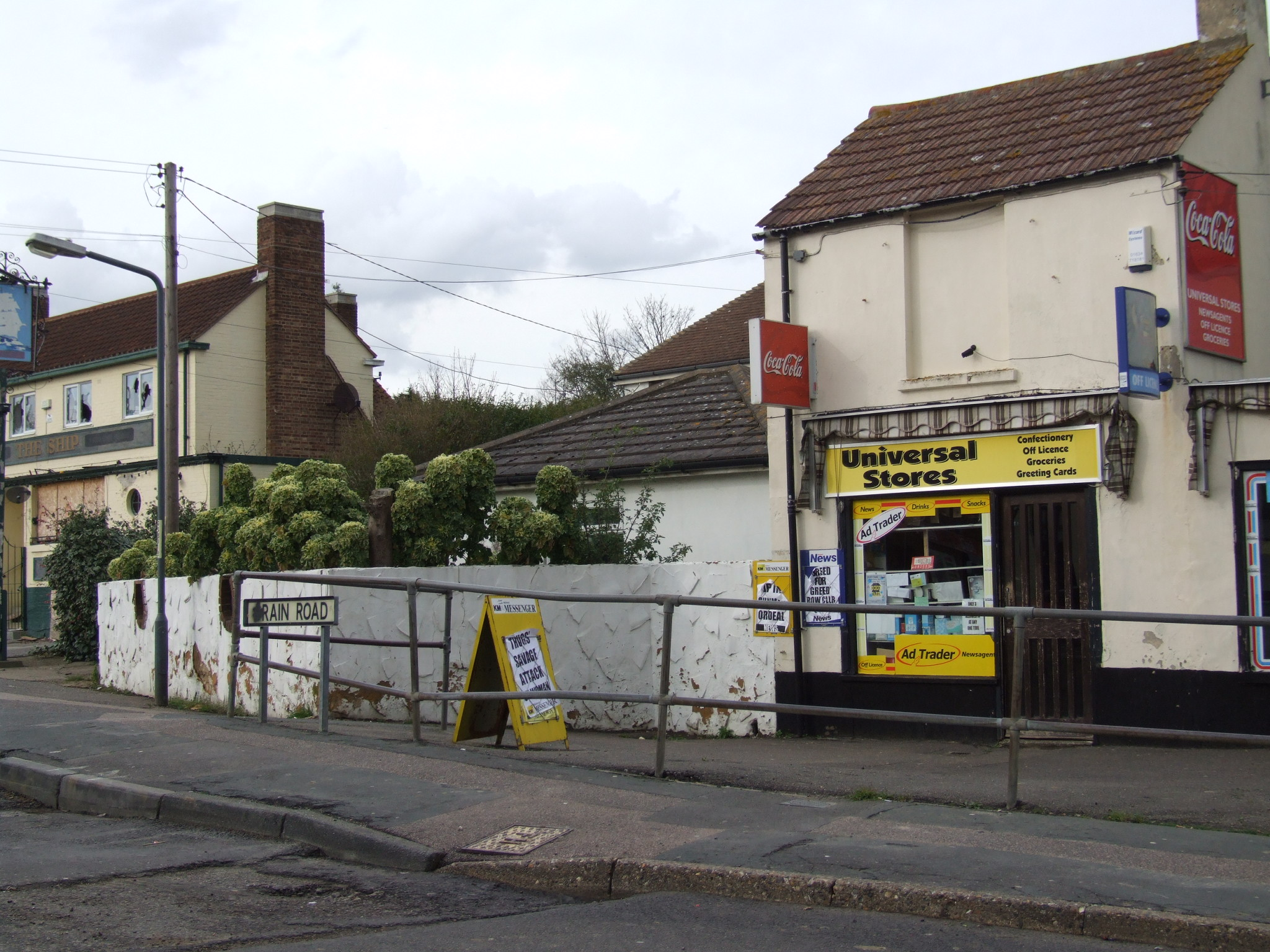
Lower Stoke village shop

Stoke is a civil parish on the Hoo Peninsula in Kent, England, to the south of Allhallows, on the north of the Medway Estuary. The parish had a population of 1,060 at the 2011 census.

The two small villages of Lower Stoke and Stoke (sometimes referred to as Upper Stoke) stand on low-lying fertile farmland that is at most 17 m above highwater. The farmland descends to the Stoke Saltings – a maze of intricate channels and small islands beloved by wading birds. The church of Saints Peter and Paul is in Stoke; it was an appendage to the Manor of Great Hoo. The building contains some Norman and Early English work dating from 1175. It has no spire.

In an Anglo-Saxon charter Stoke is referred to as "Andescohesham". It was passed with other lands by Eadberht, son of King Wihtred of Kent to the See of Rochester for "the good of his soul and the remission of sins". In 959, Lower Stoke, then called "Osterland", was granted by Queen Eadgifu to Christ Church, Canterbury. In Domesday Book it is called "Estoches" and "Stoches".

Due to its low-lying nature, Stoke has often suffered flooding, such as in 1158, 1235, 1309, 1682, and 1735 when ploughmen were swept from their fields as the sea broke through. Also, in 1791, 1854, 1874, and 1897, Stoke was cut off from the Isle of Grain for a week.

In 1720 Manor Farm was leased to Jacob Sawbridge, one of the South Sea Bubble directors.

In 1732 William Hogarth stayed overnight at the 'Nag's Head' in Lower Stoke. Due to the shortage of beds he had to share a bed.

There was a large airship base nearby at Kingsnorth from which patrols covering the North Sea were launched during World War I. The site is now covered by Kingsnorth Power Station.

Stoke has a private unlicensed airfield, home to Medway airsports club and previously part of Medway Microlights manufacturing microlight aircraft such as the Medway Executive SLA. Stoke Medway airfield is known in the aviation community as being a particularly challenging airfield to fly from. It is unique in its topography as it is situated parallel to marshes of the river Medway on one side of the runway. On the other side of the runway is an active rail line and high tension electricity pylons. The runway also has a curve along its entire length and is relatively short in aviation terms of only bring approx 450 metres long.

== Future proposals ==
Proposals made by Lord Foster in November 2011 to expand the transport system of south east England, called the Thames Hub, planned a new river barrier and road crossing and a shipping and rail complex. The most controversial part of the scheme involved remodelling the Thames Estuary, by constructing a Thames Hub Airport on the neighbouring Isle of Grain, partially on land reclaimed from the estuary but including land at Allhallows and Lower Stoke. While the road crossing is still progressing, the other proposals have been shelved, with the airport plan abandoned in July 2015 on the recommendation of the Airports Commission.

== See also ==
- Listed buildings in Stoke, Kent
