= Grade II* listed buildings in Gravesham =

There are over 20,000 Grade II* listed buildings in England. This page is a list of these buildings in the district of Gravesham in Kent.

== Gravesham ==
Name	Location	Type	Completed (Note: The date given is the date used by Historic England as significant for the initial building or that of an important part in the structure's description.)	Date designated	Grid ref. (Note: Sometimes known as OSGB36, the grid reference is based on the British national grid reference system used by the Ordnance Survey.) Geo-coordinates	Entry number (Note: The "List Entry Number" is a unique number assigned to each listed building and scheduled monument by Historic England.)	Image	Ref.
Meadow House	Cobham, Gravesham	House	1770	21 November 1966	TQ6699068623; 51°23′31″N 0°23′56″E	1373849	Upload Photo	
Owletts	Cobham	House	1683/1684	27 August 1952	TQ6651068734; 51°23′36″N 0°23′31″E	1049097	Owletts More images	
The Dairy, Cobham Hall	Cobham	Dairy	c. 1790	22 June 1982	TQ6833668617; 51°23′30″N 0°25′05″E	1350898	Upload Photo	
Parish Church of St Peter and St Paul	Luddesdown	Parish Church	13th century	21 November 1966	TQ6695566177; 51°22′12″N 0°23′50″E	1096342	Parish Church of St Peter and St Paul More images	
Church of St Mildred	Nurstead, Meopham	Church	Perhaps earlier	21 November 1966	TQ6412368279; 51°23′23″N 0°21′27″E	1096351	Church of St Mildred More images	
Killick's Mill, Meopham	Meopham	Smock Mill	1801	22 August 1952	TQ6394765183; 51°21′43″N 0°21′13″E	1054722	Killick's Mill, Meopham More images	
Church of St Peter and St Paul	Shorne	Church	12th century	21 November 1966	TQ6906171020; 51°24′47″N 0°25′47″E	1083891	Church of St Peter and St Paul More images	
Little St Katherine's	Shorne	House	19th century	27 August 1952	TQ6925171459; 51°25′01″N 0°25′57″E	1083895	Little St Katherine's More images	
Church of All Saints	Northfleet	Parish Church	1869-70	30 July 1986	TQ6355273114; 51°26′00″N 0°21′05″E	1346415	Church of All Saints More images	
Church of Our Lady of the Assumption	The Hill, Northfleet	Roman Catholic Church	1913-16	26 July 1983	TQ6247574089; 51°26′33″N 0°20′11″E	1081094	Church of Our Lady of the Assumption More images	
Church of St George	Gravesend	Parish Church	1731-1732	23 January 1952	TQ6468974341; 51°26′39″N 0°22′06″E	1089034	Church of St George More images	
Church of St Mary	Chalk	Parish Church	Late C11/early 12th century	23 January 1952	TQ6832572498; 51°25′35″N 0°25′11″E	1089044	Church of St Mary More images	
Church of St Peter and St Paul	Milton-next-Gravesend	Parish Hall	1992	23 January 1952	TQ6589773831; 51°26′21″N 0°23′08″E	1341484	Church of St Peter and St Paul More images	
Ifield Court	Ifield Court, Northfleet	House	18th century	4 July 1952	TQ6478569957; 51°24′17″N 0°22′04″E	1350208	Ifield Court More images	
Milton Chantry	Milton-next-Gravesend	House	Reformation	23 January 1952	TQ6525474338; 51°26′38″N 0°22′35″E	1089047	Milton Chantry More images	
New Tavern Fort	Gravesend	Artillery Fort	Begun 1869	24 February 1977	TQ6529274238; 51°26′35″N 0°22′37″E	1261173	New Tavern Fort More images	
The Old Rectory House	Northfleet	House	After 1656	4 July 1952	TQ6233173419; 51°26′11″N 0°20′03″E	1081093	Upload Photo	
The Town Hall	Gravesend	Town Hall	1836	23 January 1952	TQ6477974271; 51°26′36″N 0°22′11″E	1054761	The Town Hall More images	
The Town Pier	Gravesend	Pier	1831-1834	3 July 1975	TQ6477474480; 51°26′43″N 0°22′11″E	1089004	The Town Pier More images	
80 High Street	Gravesend	House	Early to mid 18th century	19 March 1974	TQ6475774398; 51°26′41″N 0°22′10″E	1367090	Upload Photo	
