= Sole Street railway station =

Railway station in Kent, England

Coordinates: 51°22′59.49″N 0°22′41.33″E

Sole Street
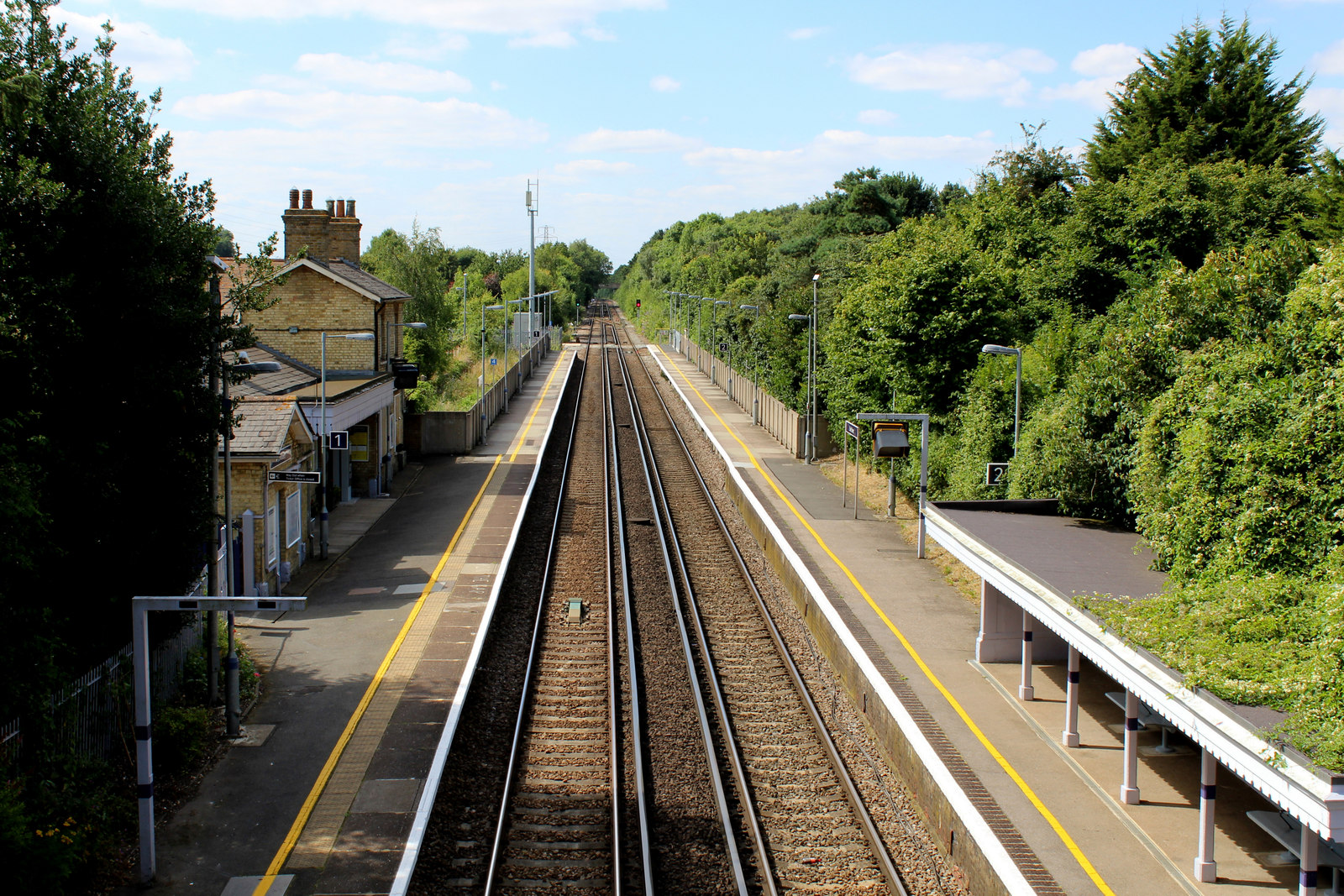

General information
- Location: Sole Street, Borough of Gravesham; England
- Grid reference: TQ655675
- Manager: Southeastern
- Platforms: 2

Other information
- Station code: SOR
- Classification: DfT category E

History
- Opened: 1 February 1861

Passengers
- 2021/22: ▲39,570
- 2022/23: ▲43,070
- 2023/24: ▲50,376
- 2024/25: ▲55,630
- 2025/26: ▼54,124
Location
Notes
- Passenger statistics from the Office of Rail and Road

Sole Street railway station is on the Chatham Main Line in England, serving the village of Sole Street, near Cobham, Kent. It is 26 miles 71 chains (43.3 km) down the line from London Victoria and is situated between Meopham and Rochester. The station is managed by Southeastern.

Office of Rail Regulation statistics suggest that the decline in traffic at Sole Street that has been noted since 2009/10 coincided with the opening of fast High Speed One services from nearby Strood.

== History ==
The main line of the London, Chatham and Dover Railway was opened in stages. The section between Rochester Bridge (then named Strood) and Bickley was opened on 3 December 1860; but Sole Street station opened later, on 1 February 1861.

== Facilities and Connections ==
The station has a ticket office which is open during the morning peak only (06:00-10:00 Mon-Fri). Customers should note the ticket office is not currently open. At other times, the station is unstaffed and tickets can be purchased from the self-service ticket machine at the station. The station is fitted with modern help points and covered seating is available on both platforms. The station also has toilets which are located in the stations ticket office. There is also a small chargeable car park located outside the main entrance to the station. The station has step free access to the London bound platform however access to the Kent bound platform is via the stepped footbridge only so is not accessible.

The station is served infrequently Monday-Saturday by the route 416 bus operated by Redroute Buses which provides connections to Gravesend and Meopham.

== Services ==
All services at Sole Street are operated by Southeastern using Class 375, 377, 465 and 466 EMUs.

The typical off-peak service in trains per hour is:

- 1 tph to London Victoria via Denmark Hill
- 1 tph to Gillingham

During the peak hours, the station is served by an additional hourly service between London Victoria and Gillingham, increasing the service to 2 tph in each direction.

On Sundays, the service to Gillingham is extended to and from Dover Priory.

Preceding station	National Rail	Following station
Meopham	Southeastern Chatham Main Line	Rochester
	Disused railways	
Meopham Line and station open	London, Chatham and Dover Railway Chatham Main Line	Rochester Bridge Line and station closed
