= Meopham railway station =

Railway station in Kent, England

Coordinates: 51°23′11.07″N 0°21′25.19″E

Meopham
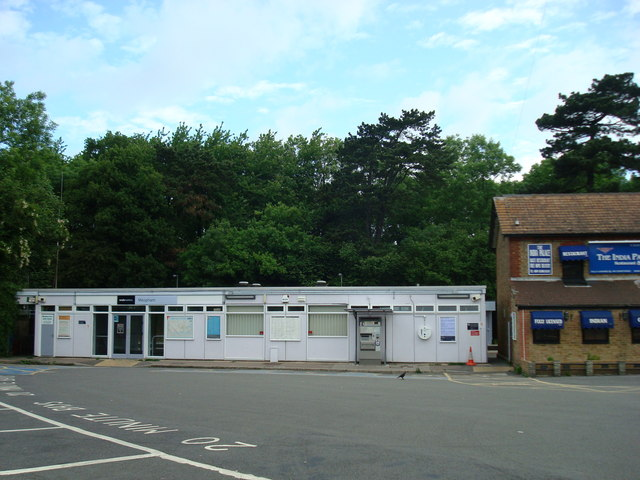

General information
- Location: Meopham, Borough of Gravesham; England
- Grid reference: TQ640678
- Managed by: Southeastern
- Platforms: 2

Other information
- Station code: MEP
- Classification: DfT category D

History
- Original company: London, Chatham and Dover Railway
- Pre-grouping: South Eastern and Chatham Railway
- Post-grouping: Southern Railway

Key dates
- 3 December 1860: Line opened
- 6 May 1861: Station opened

Passengers
- 2020/21: ▼79,426
- 2021/22: ▲0.181 million
- 2022/23: ▲0.216 million
- 2023/24: ▲0.243 million
- 2024/25: ▲0.259 million
Location
Notes
- Passenger statistics from the Office of Rail and Road

Meopham railway station is on the Chatham Main Line in England, serving the village of Meopham, Kent. It is 25 miles 76 chains (41.8 km) down the line from London Victoria and is situated between Longfield and Sole Street. The station is managed by Southeastern.

== History ==
The main line of the London, Chatham and Dover Railway was opened in stages. The section between Rochester Bridge (then named Strood) and Bickley was opened on 3 December 1860; but the station at Meopham opened later, on 6 May 1861.

The current station building is a prefabricated building erected in 1971 to British Rail's CLASP design.

== Facilities and Connections ==
The station has a ticket office which is open during the morning only (06:15-12:45 Mon-Fri and 08:00-13:15 Sat). At other times, the station is unstaffed and tickets can be purchased from the self-service ticket machine at the station. The station is fitted with modern help points and covered seating is available on both platforms. The station also has toilets which are located on the London bound platform. There is also a chargeable car park located outside the main entrance to the station. There is a taxi rank as well as cycle racks located on the station forecourt. The station has step free access to the London bound platform however access to the Kent bound platform is via the stepped footbridge only so is not accessible.

The station is served Monday-Saturday by the Arriva Southern Counties routes 306 and 308 which provides hourly connections to Sevenoaks, Borough Green, Vigo Village and Gravesend (as well as Bluewater during the evenings).

== Services ==
All services at Meopham are operated by Southeastern using Class 375, 377, 465 and 466 EMUs.

The typical off-peak service in trains per hour is:

- 2 tph to London Victoria (1 of these runs non-stop from Bromley South and 1 calls at Denmark Hill)
- 1 tph to Gillingham
- 1 tph to Dover Priory via Canterbury East

During the peak hours, the station is served by an additional hourly service between London Victoria and Gillingham. The station is also served by a number of peak hour services to and from Ramsgate.

On Sundays, the station is served by an hourly service between Dover Priory and London Victoria via Denmark Hill.

Preceding station	National Rail	Following station
Longfield	Southeastern Chatham Main Line	Sole Street or Rochester
