= Gravesend Town Hall =

Municipal building in Gravesend, Kent, England

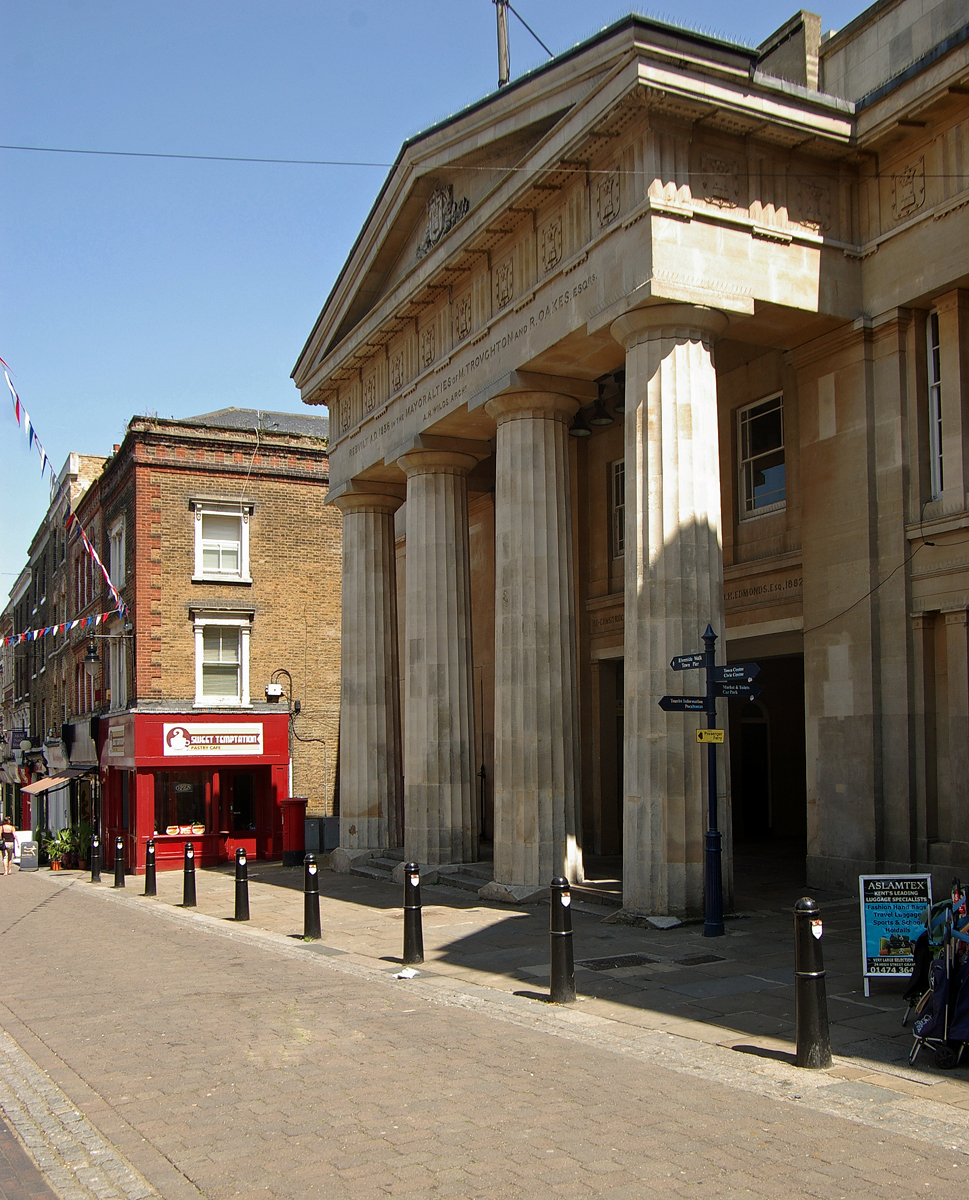
- Gravesend Town Hall

- Shown in Kent
- 51.4435°N 0.3696°E
- Location: High Street, Gravesend

History
- Built: 1764

Site notes
- Architect(s): Charles Sloane and Amon Henry Wilds
- Architectural style: Neoclassical style

Listed Building – Grade II*
- Official name: The Town Hall
- Designated: 23 January 1952
- Reference no.: 1054761

Gravesend Town Hall is a municipal building in the High Street in Gravesend, Kent, England. The town hall, which was the headquarters of Gravesend Municipal Borough Council, is a Grade II* listed building.

== History ==
The first town hall in Gravesend, which was designed with arcading on the ground floor to allow markets to be held and with an assembly room on the first floor, was erected on the east side of the High Street in 1573. It had a lock-up for prisoners. The hall was financed from the revenues received from the Gravesend–Tilbury Ferry and from the granting of freedoms of the borough as well as the revenues from the markets themselves. It remained under the ownership of the lord of the manor of Parrock in Milton-next-Gravesend until Gravesend Corporation purchased the manor, the ferry and the hall from George Etkins, who was the lord at that time, in 1694.

The current town hall was designed by Charles Sloane and completed in 1764. It was remodelled by Amon Henry Wilds in the neoclassical style with ashlar stone in 1836. The design involved a symmetrical main frontage with five bays facing onto the High Street; the central section of three bays featured a tetrastyle portico which was modelled on the Parthenon in Athens. Doric order columns supported a frieze with the borough shield repeated in the metopes between each of the triglyphs. There was a large pediment above on which statues of Minerva, Justice and Truth were erected. Internally, the principal room in the building was the grand hall.

The building was altered and extended to the rear in 1882 and again in 1898 to create extra office space to accommodate additional council staff in the context of the increasing responsibilities of local authorities. After making her last record-breaking flight, from Gravesend Airport and regaining her Britain to South Africa record, on 4 May 1936, the pilot, Amy Johnson, attended a dinner in the town hall in her honour.

The statues on the pediment became unstable and were removed in 1949. However, the town hall remained the local seat of government of Gravesend Corporation until Gravesend Civic Centre opened in Windmill Street in 1968. The last public function to be held in the town hall was in 1969 and the building was subsequently adapted to serve as a magistrates' court. It continued in that role until 2000 when, despite local opposition and an appeal to the Lord Chancellor's Department, the court closed. The building fell into a state of disrepair in the early 21st century: an extensive programme of restoration works to the building was completed in 2010 and it subsequently became available as a venue for marriages and civil partnership ceremonies.

== See also ==
- Grade II* listed buildings in Gravesham
