= Harvel =

Village in Kent, England

Coordinates: 51.3446°N 0.3685°E

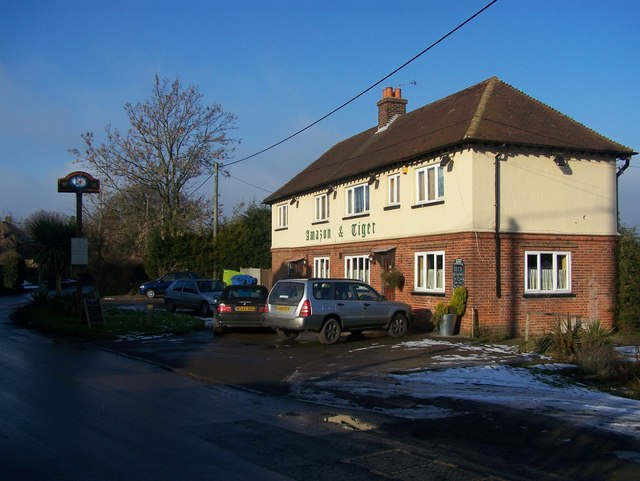
- Amazon and Tiger pub

- Location within Kent
- Civil parish: Meopham
- District: Gravesham
- Shire county: Kent
- Region: South East
- Country: England
- Sovereign state: United Kingdom
- Post town: GRAVESEND
- Postcode district: DA13
- Police: Kent
- Fire: Kent
- Ambulance: South East Coast
- UK Parliament: Gravesham

Harvel is a village in the civil parish of Meopham in the west of the county of Kent, England. It is sited on the southern edge of the North Downs.

The village's name may derive from the names Halifield (Holy Field) or Heorot Field (Hartfield) mentioned in a Saxon charters. A collection of sarsen stones north of the village may be a prehistoric tomb but is more likely a natural group.

On 27 August 1950, Harvel, along with the village of Lenham, was one of the signal receiving points (between Calais and London) of the first-ever live television pictures from the continent.

It has a village green and pond, a cricket team, a village hall, a greyhound rehoming centre and used to have a public house, called The Amazon and Tiger.

The local community was disheartened to learn that The Amazon and Tiger pub was officially closed down in 2021. Efforts were made by the community to secure an Asset of Community Value order to prevent the owners from converting the property into a residential building. Despite these efforts, the closure has had a significant impact on the area.
