= Owletts =

Historic house and gardens in Cobham, Kent, England

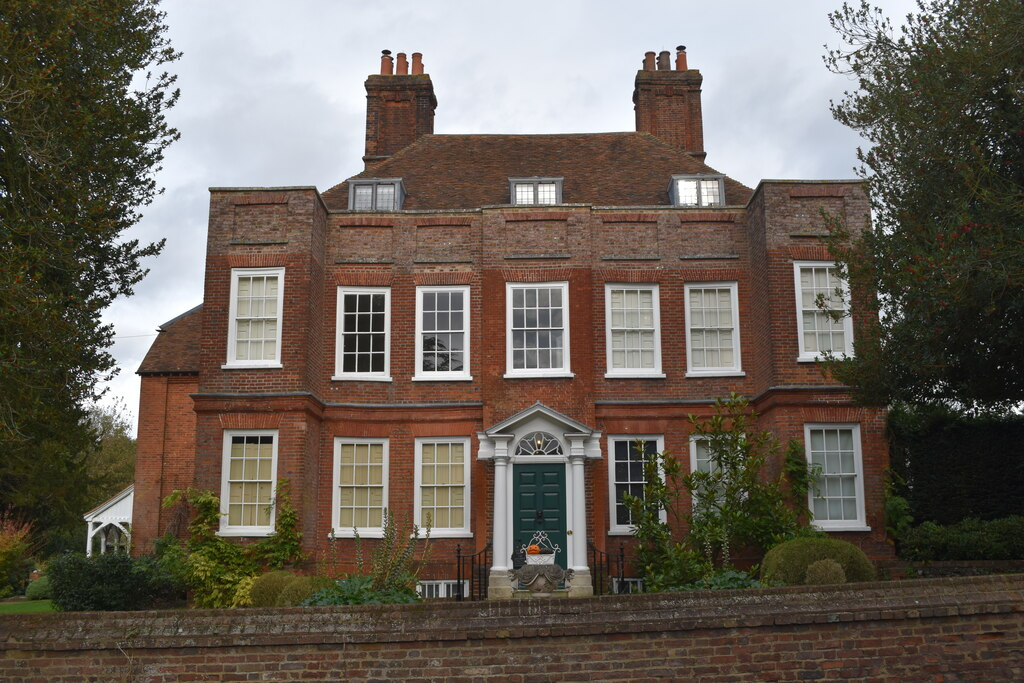

- Owletts location in Kent
- 51.393°N 0.392°E
- OS grid reference: TQ 665 687

History
- Built: 1683/4
- Built for: Bonham Hayes (farmer)

Site notes
- Architect: Bonham Hayes
- Architectural styles: extended and altered by Sir Herbert Baker
- Restored: conservation works 2010–2012 by National Trust
- Governing body: The National Trust

Listed Building
- Type: Grade II*
- Designated: 27 August 1952
- Reference no.: 1049097

Owletts is a country house 0.8 miles (1.3 km) to the northwest of the village of Cobham in Kent, England.

It is a Grade II* listed building owned by the National Trust.

== History ==
The house was originally built in 1683–84 for Bonham Hayes (died 1720), a successful, yeoman farmer of the Cobham area, and his wife Elizabeth. The red-brick Kentish Yeoman's house is symmetrical, two storeys high, with sliding sash and dormer windows. The house interiors date in part to 1684, and include a remarkably ornate Carolean plasterwork ceiling above the principal staircase.

Having passed to Hayes's son, Richard, then his grandson (also Richard), the house passed in 1894 to the Edmeades family of Nurstead (also in the parish of Gravesend), then by marriage to the Baker family.

In 1862 the renowned architect Sir Herbert Baker was born here. Owletts became Herbert Baker's home in later life and he made numerous alterations including the addition of a porch and a wing on the north-west corner of the house. He also removed the wall between the entrance hall and the drawing room and in that room installed an ornamental 'Empire' clock. The family filled the house with specially commissioned or collected furniture.

The house has a garden partly designed by Gertrude Jekyll, who was introduced to Baker by Edwin Lutyens (her friend) when he was working with Baker in Ernest George and Harold Peto's architectural office in London.

Acanthus plants growing in the garden are symbolic of Herbert Baker's architectural profession. Also within the garden is a bird-bath formed from Tivoli Order variant Corinthian capitals salvaged from the old Bank of England building by John Soane when Sir Herbert rebuilt the Bank (between 1925 and 1939).

When Herbert Baker died at the age of 83 on 4 February 1946 he left Owletts to the National Trust. The National Trust lets the property, but some rooms and the garden are opened regularly to the public. The last tenant was David Baker, the great-grandson and heir of Sir Herbert Baker, who lived there together with his family until the rent was increased in 2023. A petition was begun to keep the house open to the public.

The National Trust have said it will open ‘for at least 2 days’ a year but no new tenant is yet in place.

The house closed in 2011 for a £1 million refit, during which the collection of 900 objects and 1,400 books was carefully packed and stored off-site. It reopened on 7 April 2013.
