= Meopham =

Village in Kent, England

Coordinates: 51.364°N 0.360°E

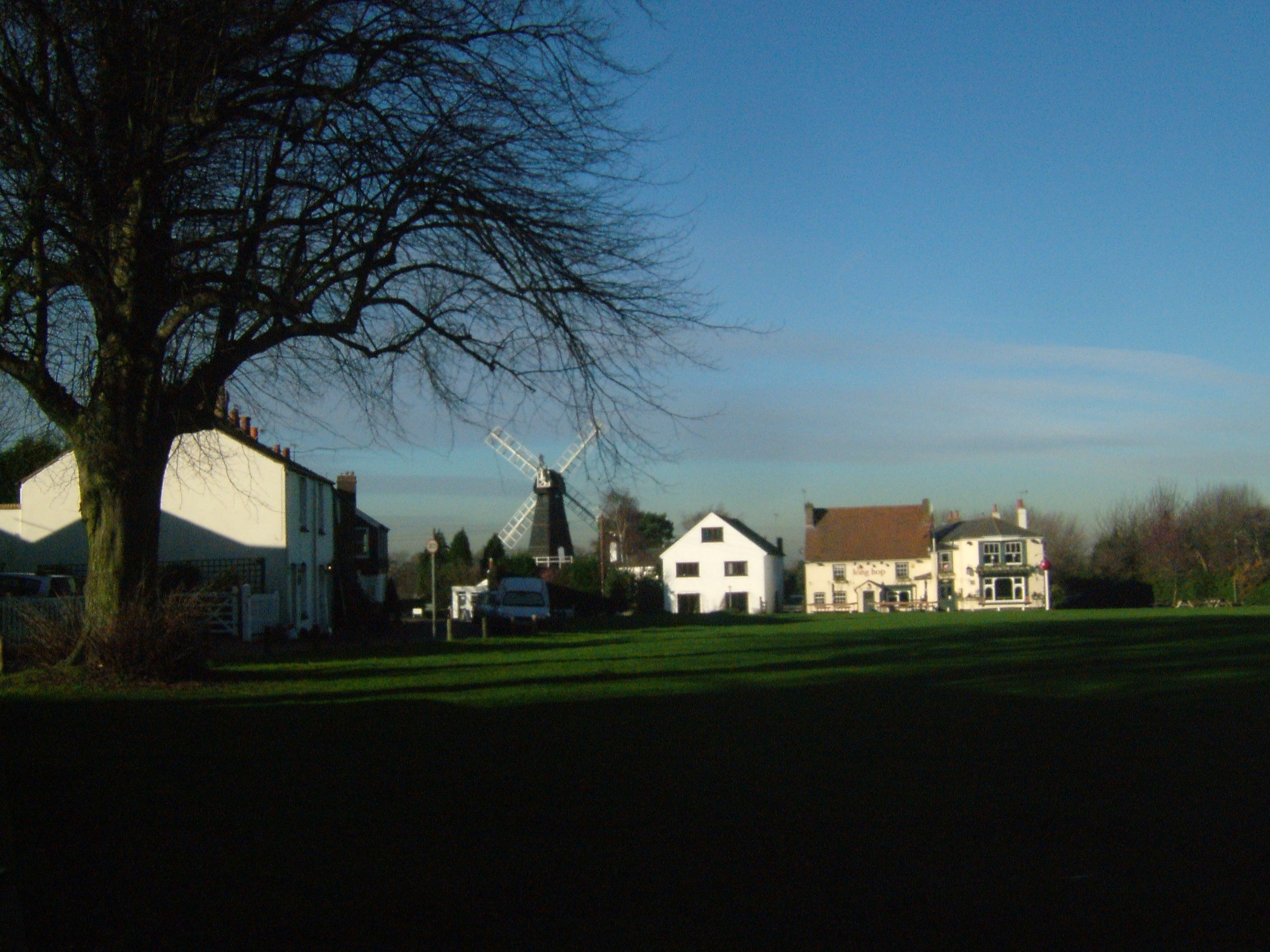
- Meopham Green

- Location within Kent
- Population: 6,795 (2021 Census)
- OS grid reference: TQ645655
- Civil parish: Meopham
- District: Gravesham
- Shire county: Kent
- Region: South East
- Country: England
- Sovereign state: United Kingdom
- Post town: GRAVESEND
- Postcode district: DA13
- Dialling code: 01474
- Police: Kent
- Fire: Kent
- Ambulance: South East Coast
- UK Parliament: Gravesham

Kent coat of arms

Meopham /ˈmɛpəm/ is a large linear village and civil parish in the Borough of Gravesham in north-west Kent, England, lying to the south of Gravesend. The parish covers 6.5 square miles (17 km^{2}), and comprises two villages and two smaller settlements; it had a population of 6,795 at the 2021 census. Meopham village is sometimes described as the longest settlement in England although others such as Brinkworth which is one village make the same claim. Meopham is one of the longest linear settlements in Europe, being 7 miles (11 km) in length.

Meopham is formally twinned with Ivanivka rural hromada in northern Ukraine. The twinning ceremony took place on 6th March 2025.

== History ==
The name of the village derives from Meapaham (Meapa's village): it is first recorded in 788, in the reign of King Offa. The modern pronunciation of the name comes from different ways of writing and spelling.

Benedictine monks established a priory hospital at Meopham in the 12th century and throughout the Middle Ages three medieval manor houses - those of Meopham, Dodmore and Nurstead - governed the land now encompassing the parish. Edward Hasted in 1797 described the village as being "out of the way" and with "no well frequented thoroughfare through it". Since the 1920s, when the road numbering scheme started, the main road through the village, the A227, has become busier as a through-route connecting North Kent with the M20 motorway at the foot of the North Downs, although this now has been somewhat relieved by the M25.

Historically, the parish of Meopham was in the Hundred of Toltingtrough.

== The parish ==
The parish comprises the main village, divided into four named settlements; the outlying village of Harvel (approx 2 miles south-east); and two other settlements: Dodmore (still comprising mostly rural land from The Street southeastwards for approx 1 mile towards Harvel) and Culverstone (approx 1.5 miles to the south). The Parish Council, which now owns the lordship of the manor of Meopham, meets at Meopham Windmill and consists of twelve members (aka joint trustees of the ancient manor).

=== The main village ===
From the north along the main A227, the four settlements are Hook Green; The Street (Dodmore); Meopham Green; and Culverstone. The first three contain conservation areas. There were originally seven village greens in the parish; only three remain today.

Hook Green is the most northerly of the settlements. Originally called Hoo Green, it lies around a small triangular village green to the west of the main road. There are again many listed buildings in the area, including the Weavers Cottage. More modern developments are situated near to Meopham Railway Station to the north.

The Street (Dodmore) is the oldest of the village's settlements, where parts of the medieval manorial mansion of Dodmore stand, although the original structure was badly damaged in an earthquake of 1382: it is close to the 14th-century church, the parish church of St John the Baptist. In addition, there are many other historic buildings, including The George Inn, where the manorial court of Dodmore once sat. At The George Inn there is still the Courtroom Bar, the room in which the court baron of the manor was held. Richard Adamson, a shipbroker and elder son of the late Dr Donald Adamson, owner of the Tudor manor house, succeeded as the present lord of the manor of Dodmore in 2024. The family of the cricketer Thomas Nordish worked Dodmore Manor Farm. In the late 20th century Ifield CC relocated to within Dodmore's ancient manorial boundaries, becoming New Ifield CC.

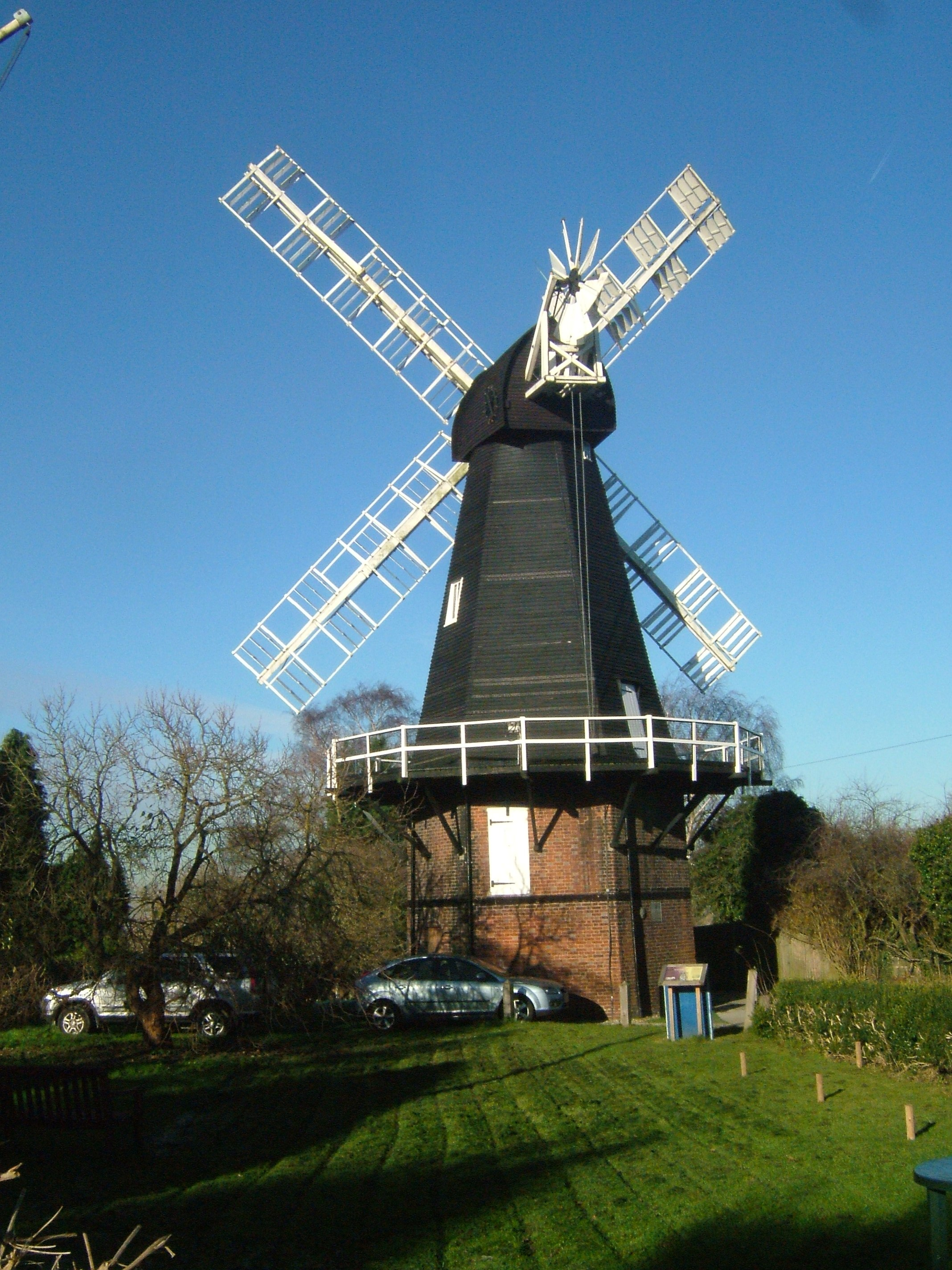
Killick's Mill, Meopham

Meopham Green is by far the largest remaining village green in the parish. The main road passes to the west; around the other two sides are buildings, many of which are of 18th- and 19th-century origin. Here are two public houses: the King's Arms; and The Cricketers' Inn, previously The Long Hop. Just to the north of the Green is Meopham Vineyard.

Meopham Green is home to a cricket pitch, where the sport has been played every summer since at least 1776, and which is one of Kent's idyllic settings for the game; the former prime minister, Sir John Major, is a patron of Meopham Cricket Club where he stood on a soapbox during the 1992 general election campaign. Meopham Windmill is nearby.

Culverstone Green is the most southerly of the main village settlements. The original village green has mostly been given up to road widening. On the main road, and down Whitepost Lane to the east, are both older and modern houses; a small supermarket; and a petrol station. A notable local house is "Lacknut House" (1832-1843) located directly opposite Culverstone Green, named after the area of land to the rear "Lacknuts" which was used as a fruit farm.

There is a considerably built-up area between the main road and Harvel. This is known as Culverstone Valley: it covers some 250 acres (100 ha) and lies among woodlands. It is described as a unique development, which in its origins was the result of the sale of plots of land in the 1930s. Originally, chalets, shacks and caravans were built on the plots. Since then unauthorised developments, often extending the original buildings, have taken place in an area which is now Green Belt. Poor access and limited facilities such as proper drainage has led Gravesham Borough Council to take action by curbing this trend.

=== Other settlements ===
The other two main settlements in the parish are Nurstead (until 1935 a separate civil parish), where Nurstead Court is located next to the parish church, with former estate workers' cottages nearby; and Camer, once home to the family of Smith-Masters, with a few cottages near Camer Park.

== Geography ==
The village lies on the dip slope of the North Downs, 480 feet (150 m) above sea level at its highest.

== The windmill ==
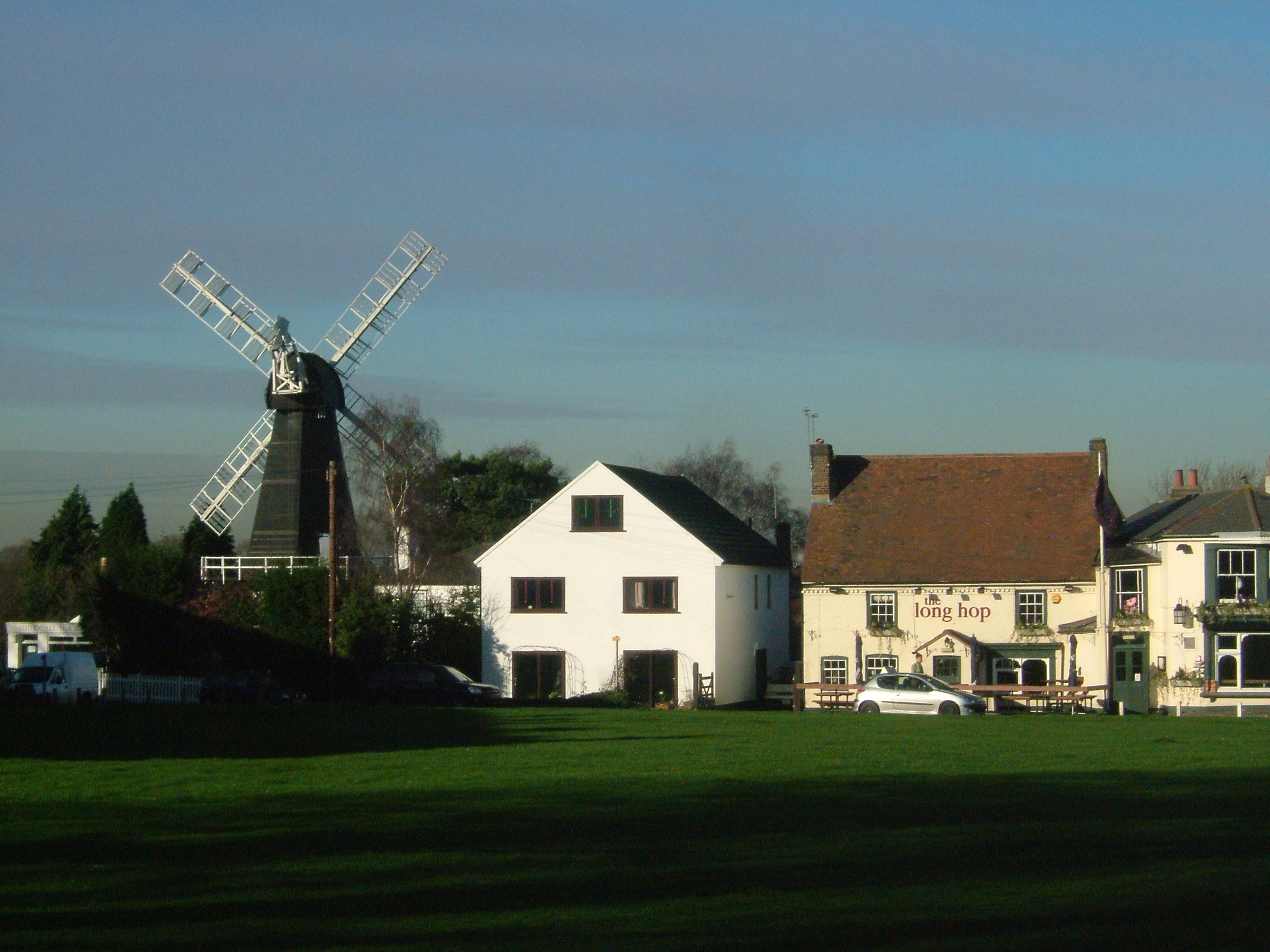
Meopham Windmill and Green

The windmill was built by James Killick, a millwright from Strood, in 1801. After his death in 1823, it passed to his wife Sukey, then to his son James, and after to his grandson Thomas who died in 1891. The Killicks lived in Strood where the family also owned mills and were reputed to walk the eight miles to Meopham each day. The mill worked by wind until 1929 and then by engine until 1965. It has been fully restored and is now in full working order.

== Churches ==
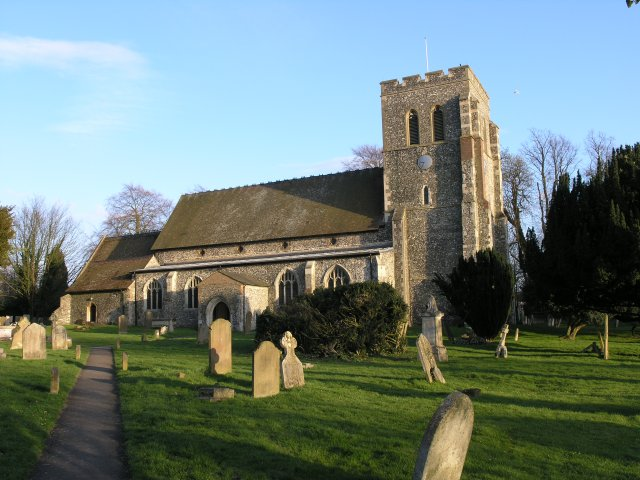
Meopham Church

There are two Church of England parish churches (now combined into one benefice): the grade I listed parish church of St John the Baptist, Meopham and Nurstead's 14th-century church of St Mildred. Other churches include Mount Zion Baptist Church built in 1828 and nearby Meopham Green, South Street Baptist Church, to the north of Culverstone and the Roman Catholic Church of St Paul, consecrated in 1965.

== Education ==
There are three state schools in the village: the secondary Meopham School has developed as a specialist sports academy, and this is where Meopham Library is situated too; there are two primary schools: Meopham Community Academy (formerly Meopham Community Primary School) and Culverstone Green Primary School. Gravesend Grammar School is within the borough, and nearby are fee-paying schools, such as Cobham Hall School, and King's School, Rochester.

== Transport ==
The main road through the village, the A227, carries a large amount of traffic. It first became a main road under the Turnpike Acts in 1825, when it was designed to connect Gravesend with Wrotham.

Meopham Railway Station, at the north end of the village, is on the Chatham Main Line which runs to Victoria Station in London. Ebbsfleet International Station is under 8 miles (13 km) away, but is only accessible to passengers via Gravesend.

== Notable people ==
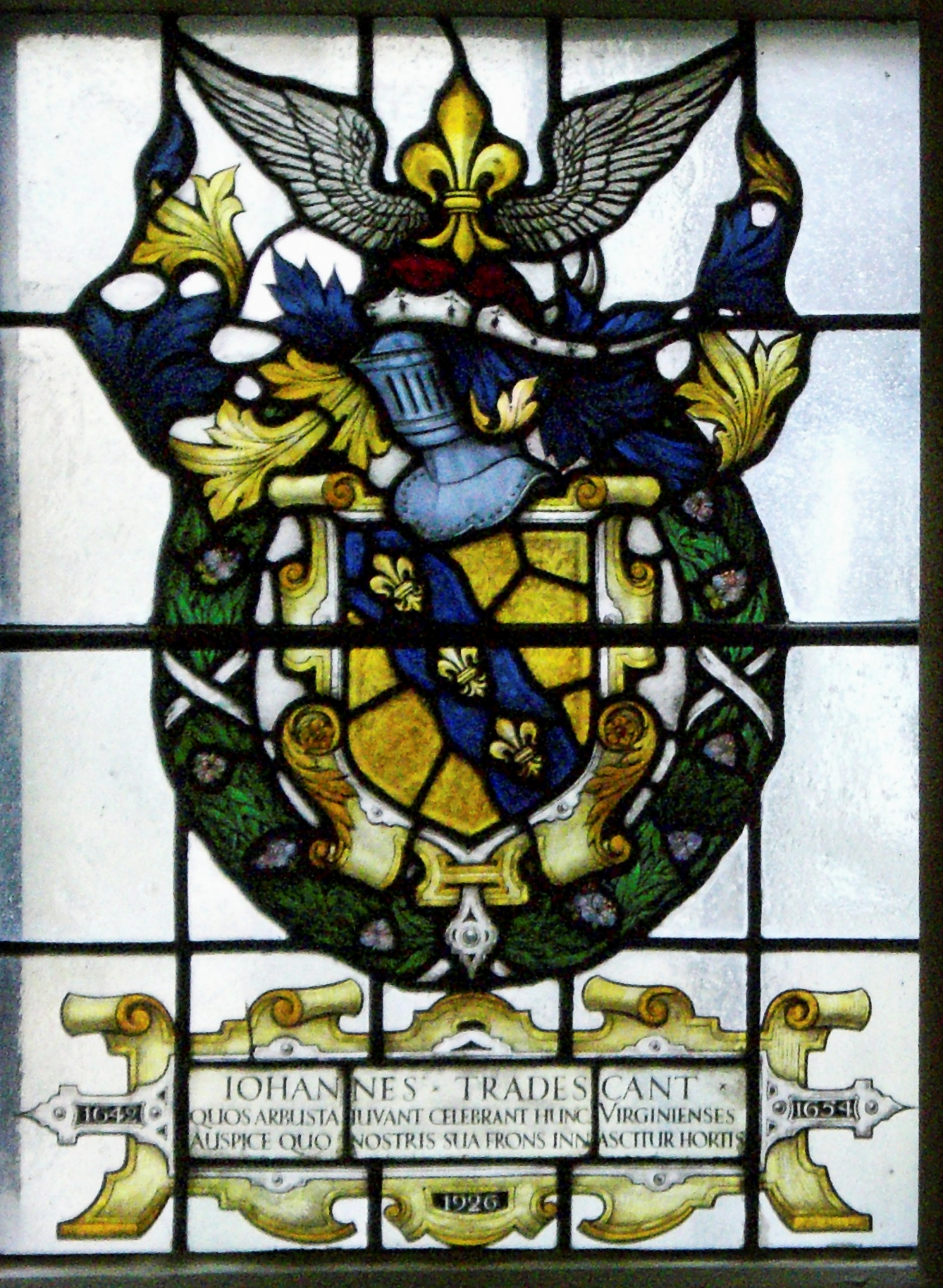
Stained glass window displaying the arms of John Tradescant at the Museum of the History of Science, Oxford

Famous residents have included:

- Simon de Mepham, Archbishop of Canterbury (1327–1332)
- John Tradescant the Elder (c. 1570–1638)
  - John Tradescant the Younger (1608–1662), son of the above, both botanists

In Meopham Church are memorial tablets to the Victorian courtiers, Sir Sydney Waterlow Bt (1822–1906) and Sir Fleetwood Edwards (1842–1910), and to the Smith-Masters family, lords of the manor of Dodmore.

Residents in more recent times include:

- Lauren Bennett (1989-2026), singer in girl group G.R.L, featured on the song Party Rock Anthem.
- Donald Adamson (1939–2024), author and historian
- Sedley Andrus (1915–2009), herald-at-arms
- Cuthbert Hilton Golding-Bird (1848–1939), surgeon, local historian, and son of Dr Golding Bird FRS
- Sir Roger de Grey (1918–1995), President of the Royal Academy
- Major James Edmeades (1843–1917), Army officer and cricketer
- Sir Michael Gambon (1940–2023), actor
- Michael Gilbert (1912–2006), author
- Spencer Gore (1878–1914), artist
- Hughie Green (1920–1997), television presenter
- Sir Edmund Irving (1910–1990), hydrographer
- Kelvin MacKenzie (b. 1946), former editor of The Sun
- Sir George Murray (1849–1936), Civil servant
- Daphne Oram (1925–2003), composer and electronic music pioneer
- John Ovenden (1942–2018), MP for Gravesham 1974–79
- Harry Price (1881–1948), psychic researcher
- Graham Sutherland (1903–1980), artist
- Richard Warwick (1945–1997), actor

Current residents are:

- David Chater (b. 1953), journalist
- Major Sir Richard Gethin Bt (b. 1949), Army officer and civil engineer
- Adam Holloway (b. 1965), MP for Gravesham 2005–24.

The Arnold family were seated at Meopham Court, where author and publisher Ralph Arnold (1906–1970) was born. The Arnold family included eight-times Mayor of Gravesend and County Alderman George Matthew Arnold, JP DL FSA, whose relatives include the solicitor George Arnold of Milton Hall, Kent, Sir Arthur Arnold and Sir Edwin Arnold.

== See also ==
- North Downs
- Meopham air disaster
- Archbishop Simon de Mepeham
- Listed buildings in Meopham
