= Rochester railway station =

Railway station in Kent, England

Rochester
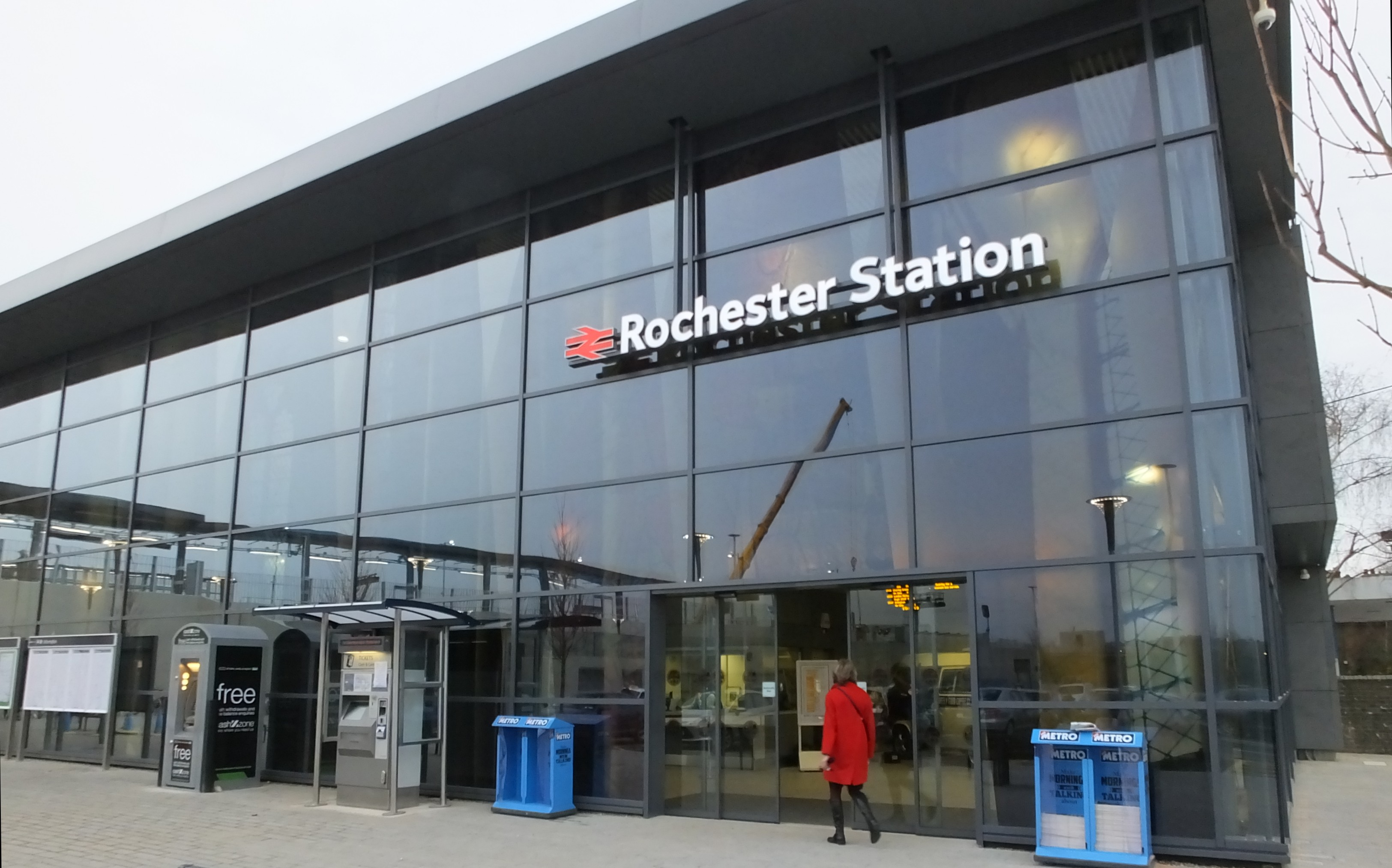
- Rochester station building opened on 13 December 2015

General information
- Location: Rochester, Borough of Medway; England
- Coordinates: 51.38554°N 0.51018°E
- Grid reference: TQ745684
- Managed by: Southeastern
- Platforms: 3

Other information
- Station code: RTR
- Classification: DfT category D

Key dates
- 1 March 1892: Opened
- 13 December 2015: Resited

Passengers
- 2020/21: ▼0.585 million
- Interchange: ▼10,336
- 2021/22: ▲1.458 million
- Interchange: ▲22,799
- 2022/23: ▲1.784 million
- Interchange: ▲55,711
- 2023/24: ▲1.908 million
- Interchange: ▼52,672
- 2024/25: ▲2.059 million
- Interchange: ▼42,930
Location
Notes
- Passenger statistics from the Office of Rail and Road

Rochester railway station is on the Chatham Main Line in England, serving the town of Rochester, Kent. It is 33 miles 61 chains (54.3 km) down the line from London Victoria and is situated between Sole Street and Chatham.

The station and most trains that call are operated by Southeastern and Thameslink, including a handful of peak services to and from Bedford operated by the latter.

In December 2015 a new station on Corporation Street opened 500 metres (1,600 ft) to the west of the original station which it replaced. It is now closer to the town centre and its historic buildings. Artwork on the glass created by Katayoun Dowlatshahi

== Original station ==
The first station opened as part of the London Chatham & Dover Railway in 1892. It was set back some distance from the High Street to the east of the busy junction at Star Hill, and access to the platforms was via tunnels from the ticket office. The station buildings and platforms were taken out of use in December 2015.

== New station ==
In 2013, Medway Council approved plans submitted by Network Rail to construct a new station for a cost of £26m. On 16 January 2014 Gallagher Ltd cast the reinforced concrete base slab for a new subway for the station with construction continuing into 2015. According to the billboards adjoining the station site, the 900-tonne (890-long-ton; 990-short-ton) concrete subway was to be the first part of the project to be completed; this took place over Easter 2015. Office of Rail Regulation confirmation of the closure of the old station were exhibited at Charing Cross station and elsewhere in October 2015.

The new station was opened for passenger use on 13 December 2015 with its official opening by the Duke of Kent on 24 February 2016.

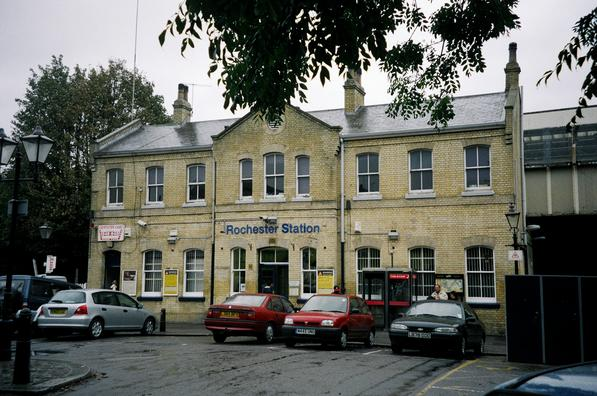
Rochester (original) station building closed on 13 December 2015.

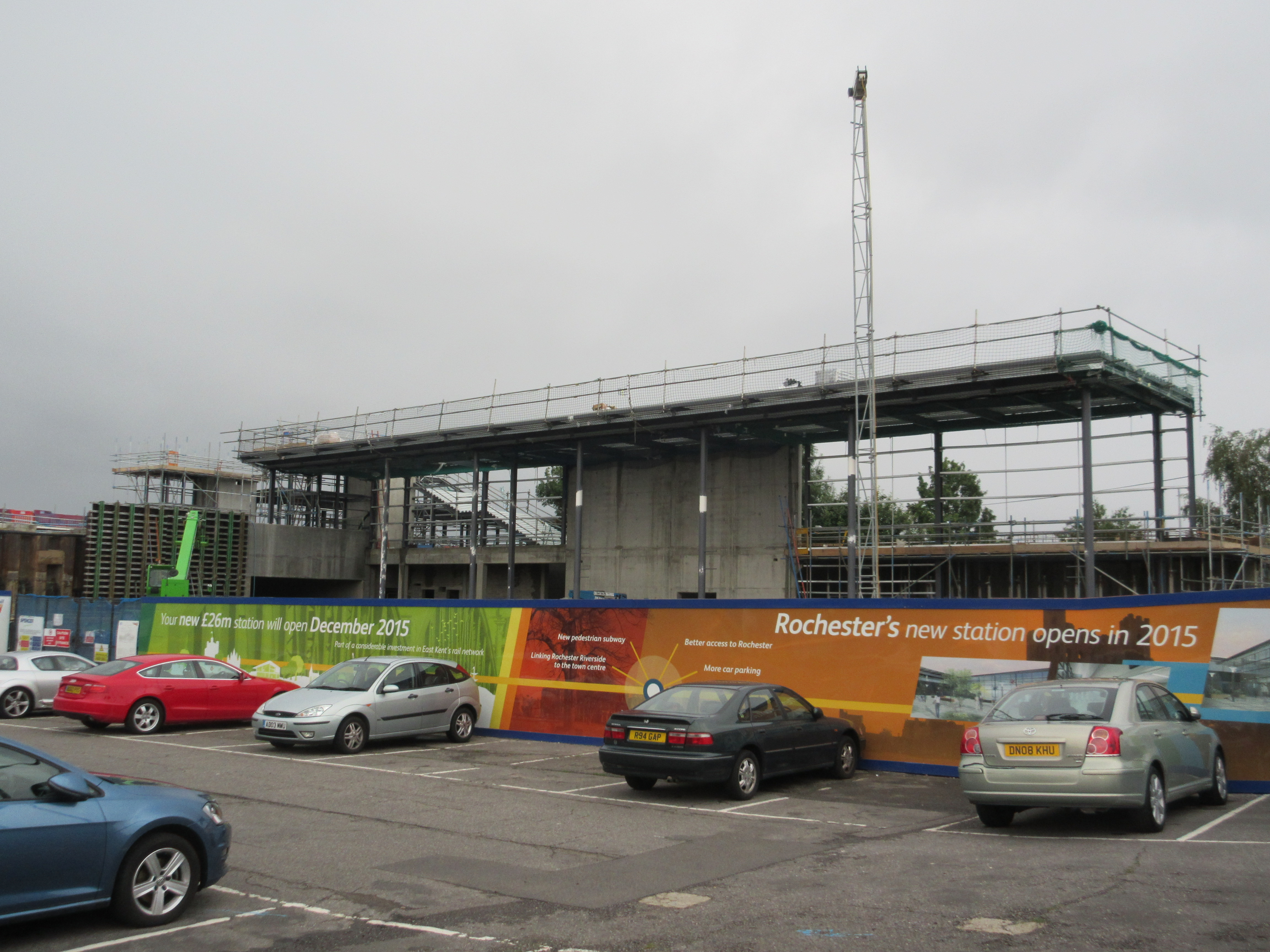
Under construction platforms (on the left) and the large entrance hall (on the right).

== Layout ==
Platform 1 serves trains towards Strood, Gravesend, Ebbsfleet International, Dartford, Meopham, Bromley South, Central London, St Albans and Luton

Platform 2 serves trains towards Gillingham, Faversham, Margate, Ramsgate, Canterbury East and Dover Priory

Platform 3 has now opened up as a through platform, service trains towards Gillingham, Faversham and the Kent Coast. Trains can also terminate here before heading back towards London. As the through line runs all the way through Platform 4 of the old Rochester station, it can be used to hold long freight services to allow passenger services to pass, removing a bottleneck.

== Services ==
Services at Rochester are operated by Southeastern and Thameslink using Class 375, 377, 395, 465, 466 and 700 EMUs.

The typical off-peak service in trains per hour is:

- 2 tph to London St Pancras International
- 3 tph to London Victoria (2 of these run non-stop from Bromley South and 1 runs via Denmark Hill)
- 2 tph to Luton via Dartford and Greenwich
- 1 tph to Gillingham
- 2 tph to Rainham
- 1 tph to Faversham
- 1 tph to Dover Priory via Canterbury East
- 2 tph to Ramsgate

Additional services, including trains to and from London Charing Cross via Sidcup, and fast trains to and from London Cannon Street call at the station during the peak hours.

Preceding station	National Rail	Following station
Sole Street or Meopham	Southeastern Chatham Main Line	Chatham
Strood	Southeastern High Speed 1	Chatham
Strood	Thameslink North Kent Line	Chatham
Strood	Southeastern North Kent Line Peak Hours Only	Chatham
London Bridge	Southeastern South Eastern Main Line (via Chislehurst Junction) Peak Hours only	Chatham
	Disused railways	
Rochester Bridge Line and station closed	London, Chatham and Dover Railway Chatham Main Line	Chatham Line and station open
