= Listed buildings in Meopham =

Civil Parish in Kent, England

Meopham is a village and civil parish in the Gravesham district of Kent, England. It contains two grade I, two grade II* and 46 grade II listed buildings that are recorded in the National Heritage List for England.

This list is based on the information retrieved online from Historic England.

== Key ==
Grade	Criteria
I	Buildings that are of exceptional interest
II*	Particularly important buildings of more than special interest
II	Buildings that are of special interest

== Listing ==
Name	Grade	Location	Type	Completed (Note: The date given is the date used by Historic England as significant for the initial building or that of an important part in the structure's description.)	Date designated	Grid ref. (Note: The grid reference is based on the British national grid reference system, sometimes known as OSGB36, used by the Ordnance Survey.) Geo-coordinates	Notes	Entry number (Note: The "List Entry Number" is a unique number assigned to each listed building and scheduled monument by Historic England.)	Image	Wikidata
Bailiffs House	II	Camer Estate			26 July 1983	TQ6504467081; 51°22′44″N 0°22′12″E		1052333	Upload Photo	Q26304121
Building Approximately 30 Metres to West of Camer House	II	Camer Estate			26 July 1983	TQ6512467083; 51°22′44″N 0°22′17″E		1350234	Upload Photo	Q26633456
Camer House	II	Camer Estate			21 November 1966	TQ6516967092; 51°22′44″N 0°22′19″E		1052357	Upload Photo	Q26304144
5 and 6, Camer Street	II	5 and 6, Camer Street			26 July 1983	TQ6536567150; 51°22′46″N 0°22′29″E		1096344	Upload Photo	Q26388632
9 and 10, Camer Street	II	9 and 10, Camer Street			26 July 1983	TQ6539867144; 51°22′45″N 0°22′31″E		1096345	Upload Photo	Q26388633
Camer Green Cottage	II	8, Camer Street			26 July 1983	TQ6539267182; 51°22′47″N 0°22′31″E		1372283	Upload Photo	Q26653412
Somers	II	7, Camer Street			21 November 1966	TQ6538667137; 51°22′45″N 0°22′30″E		1350235	Upload Photo	Q26633457
Merryweather	II	David Street, Harvel			13 January 1999	TQ6475563800; 51°20′58″N 0°21′52″E		1245056	Upload Photo	Q26537629
Parker's Cottage	II	David Street			26 July 1983	TQ6470664146; 51°21′09″N 0°21′50″E		1052340	Upload Photo	Q26304127
Rabbit's Corner	II	David Street			26 July 1983	TQ6485363767; 51°20′57″N 0°21′57″E		1096346	Upload Photo	Q26388634
Dean Manor	II	Dean Lane			21 November 1966	TQ6625465336; 51°21′46″N 0°23′12″E		1372618	Upload Photo	Q26653717
Barncote Cottage	II	Harvel Lane			26 July 1983	TQ6481762896; 51°20′29″N 0°21′54″E		1350236	Upload Photo	Q26633459
Harvel House	II	Harvel Lane			26 July 1983	TQ6487163078; 51°20′34″N 0°21′57″E		1372620	Upload Photo	Q26653719
Crickfield Farmhouse	II	Harvel Street			21 November 1966	TQ6514163196; 51°20′38″N 0°22′11″E		1096347	Upload Photo	Q26388635
Forge Cottage	II	Harvel Street			21 November 1966	TQ6510363251; 51°20′40″N 0°22′09″E		1051595	Upload Photo	Q26303447
Old Pond House	II	Harvel Street			21 November 1966	TQ6519663229; 51°20′39″N 0°22′14″E		1350237	Upload Photo	Q26633460
Coomb Hill Farmhouse	II	Leywood Road			26 July 1983	TQ6628364596; 51°21′22″N 0°23′12″E		1096348	Upload Photo	Q26388636
Melliker Farmhouse	II	Longfield Road			26 July 1983	TQ6376067110; 51°22′46″N 0°21′06″E		1039907	Upload Photo	Q26291703
Hook Green Farmhouse	II	Melliker Lane			26 July 1983	TQ6424067345; 51°22′53″N 0°21′31″E		1350238	Upload Photo	Q26633461
Mulberry House	II	Melliker Lane			26 July 1983	TQ6419067407; 51°22′55″N 0°21′29″E		1039911	Upload Photo	Q26291707
The White House	II	Melliker Lane			26 July 1983	TQ6420667453; 51°22′57″N 0°21′30″E		1096349	Upload Photo	Q26388637
Nevill House	II	Norwood Lane			26 July 1983	TQ6427167583; 51°23′01″N 0°21′33″E		1096350	Upload Photo	Q26388638
Norwood Farmhouse	II	Norwood Lane			5 August 1982	TQ6457767535; 51°22′59″N 0°21′49″E		1039912	Upload Photo	Q26291708
Waterditch	II	Norwood Lane			26 July 1983	TQ6421067593; 51°23′01″N 0°21′30″E		1039914	Upload Photo	Q26291710
Church of St Mildred	II*	Nurstead Lane			21 November 1966	TQ6412368279; 51°23′23″N 0°21′27″E		1096351	Church of St Mildred More images	Q17544904
Nurstead Court	I	Nurstead Lane			21 November 1966	TQ6405668568; 51°23′33″N 0°21′24″E		1350239	Upload Photo	Q17529821
Nurstead Hill Farmhouse	II	Nurstead Lane			26 July 1983	TQ6272268262; 51°23′24″N 0°20′14″E		1372094	Upload Photo	Q26653220
Nurstead Lodge	II	Nurstead Lane			26 July 1983	TQ6412968359; 51°23′26″N 0°21′27″E		1350240	Upload Photo	Q26633462
West Down Farmhouse	II	Shipley Hills Road			21 November 1966	TQ6262966040; 51°22′12″N 0°20′06″E		1372097	Upload Photo	Q26653224
Dorrington Cottage	II	The Street			26 July 1983	TQ6442366030; 51°22′10″N 0°21′39″E		1039898	Upload Photo	Q26291692
Elizabeth House (the Post Office)	II	The Street			26 July 1983	TQ6442366014; 51°22′10″N 0°21′39″E		1350241	Upload Photo	Q26633463
Well House	II	The Street			21 November 1966	TQ6439766036; 51°22′11″N 0°21′37″E		1096352	Upload Photo	Q26388639
Barnside	II	Wrotham Road			26 July 1983	TQ6418865341; 51°21′48″N 0°21′25″E		1096356	Upload Photo	Q26388643
Church Cottages	II	Wrotham Road			26 July 1983	TQ6440066268; 51°22′18″N 0°21′38″E		1054716	Upload Photo	Q26306374
Evenden Farmhouse	II	Wrotham Road			8 November 1976	TQ6437767196; 51°22′48″N 0°21′38″E		1096354	Upload Photo	Q26388641
Ivy House	II	Wrotham Road			26 July 1983	TQ6375463972; 51°21′04″N 0°21′01″E		1096353	Upload Photo	Q26388640
Leylands Barn	II	Wrotham Road			26 July 1983	TQ6384864832; 51°21′32″N 0°21′07″E		1350206	Upload Photo	Q26633431
Leylands Farm Cottage	II	Wrotham Road			26 July 1983	TQ6378364630; 51°21′26″N 0°21′03″E		1081084	Upload Photo	Q26356204
Leylands Orchard	II	Wrotham Road			26 July 1983	TQ6385464853; 51°21′33″N 0°21′07″E		1096357	Upload Photo	Q26388644
Meopham War Memorial	II	Wrotham Road, DA13 0AP			18 May 2016	TQ6413865252; 51°21′45″N 0°21′23″E		1435138	Upload Photo	Q26678074
Meopham Windmill	II*	Wrotham Road			22 August 1952	TQ6394765183; 51°21′43″N 0°21′13″E		1054722	Meopham Windmill More images	Q6407644
Owls Castle	II	Wrotham Road			26 July 1983	TQ6354763199; 51°20′40″N 0°20′49″E		1350207	Upload Photo	Q26633432
Owls Castle Barn	II	Wrotham Road			26 July 1983	TQ6356363171; 51°20′39″N 0°20′49″E		1081085	Upload Photo	Q26356206
Parish Church of St John the Baptist	I	Wrotham Road			21 November 1966	TQ6447166240; 51°22′17″N 0°21′41″E		1039866	Parish Church of St John the Baptist More images	Q17529798
The George Inn	II	Wrotham Road			21 November 1966	TQ6437866005; 51°22′10″N 0°21′36″E		1096355	The George Inn More images	Q26388642
The Old Forge the Old Forge Cottage	II	Wrotham Road			12 June 1974	TQ6430767297; 51°22′51″N 0°21′35″E		1367140	Upload Photo	Q26648663

== See also ==
- Grade I listed buildings in Kent
- Grade II* listed buildings in Kent

== Sources ==
- Newman, John (2012) [1969], Kent: West and the Weald, The Buildings of England, New Haven and London: Yale University Press, ISBN 978-0-300-18509-6
