= Toltingtrough =

Historical division of Kent, England

- Former subdivision of England
- Area
  - Coordinates: 51.395480°N 0.326980°E
- History
  - Origin: Anglo-Saxon period
  - Created: pre-1066
  - Abolished: 1894
  - Succeeded by: Strood Rural District, Northfleet Urban District, borough of Gravesend
- Status: obsolete
- Government: Hundred
- Subdivisions
  - Type: Parishes (see text)
  - Units: Parishes

Toltingtrough (or Toltingtrow) was a hundred in the Lathe of Aylesford in the county of Kent, England. This hundred is called, in some ancient writings, Toltetern and Tollentr, and in Domesday, Tollentru. In the return made of the several knights fees throughout England, by inquisition into the exchequer, in the 7th year of king Edward I, the archbishop of Canterbury appears to have been then lord of this Hundred.

In the 20th year of king Edward III, on the levying 40 shillings on every knight's fee, this Hundred answered for four knights fees and a half.

The hundred included the parishes of

- Gravesend
- Ifield
- Luddesdown
- Meopham
- Milton
- Northfleet
- Nurstead

The town of Gravesend & Milton was incorporated during the reign of Elizabeth I and encompassed the parishes of Gravesend and Milton. Milton civil parish was abolished in 1915.

Nurstead and Ifield civil parishes were abolished in 1935, when they were incorporated into Cobham.

The Borough of Gravesham created in 1974 contains the same area, plus Chalk, Higham, Shorne and Cobham.

The importance of the hundred courts declined from the 17th century, and most of their powers were extinguished with the establishment of county courts in 1867. In 1894 the Hundred was succeeded by Strood Rural District, the Urban District of Northfleet and the municipal borough of Gravesend.

The area and population of each parish and the totals for the Hundred were as follows:

Parish	Area (acres)	Pop. 1891
Gravesend	564	9940
Ifield	313	81
Luddesdown	1995	320
Meopham	4713	1170
Milton	695	13936
Northfleet	3934	11717
Nurstead	522	56
TOTAL	12736	37220
