= Thomas Nordish =

English cricketer

Thomas Nordish (baptised 25 March 1785 – 1 July 1842) was an English cricketer. He was a wicket-keeper who played for Kent in the early 19th century.

Nordish was a farmer and horse dealer who lived at Dodmore Manor Farm, Meopham throughout his life. He was the son of Thomas and Ann Nordish (Note: The family's surname was sometimes spelt as Nordash.) and played club cricket in the Meopham area. He first played for Kent in 1805 and played in two matches, one in 1815 and one in 1823, opening the batting on both occasions. His highest score of nine runs came in his first innings.

In 1818 Nordish played for England against a 22-man Nottingham in a minor match.

Nordish married Elizabeth Dorrinton in 1827. He died at Meopham in 1842 aged 57.

== Bibliography ==
- Carlaw, Derek (2020). Kent County Cricketers, A to Z: Part One (1806–1914) (PDF). Cardiff: ACS.
