= Singlewell, Kent =

Coordinates: 51.412°N 0.3754°E

Singlewell or Ifield
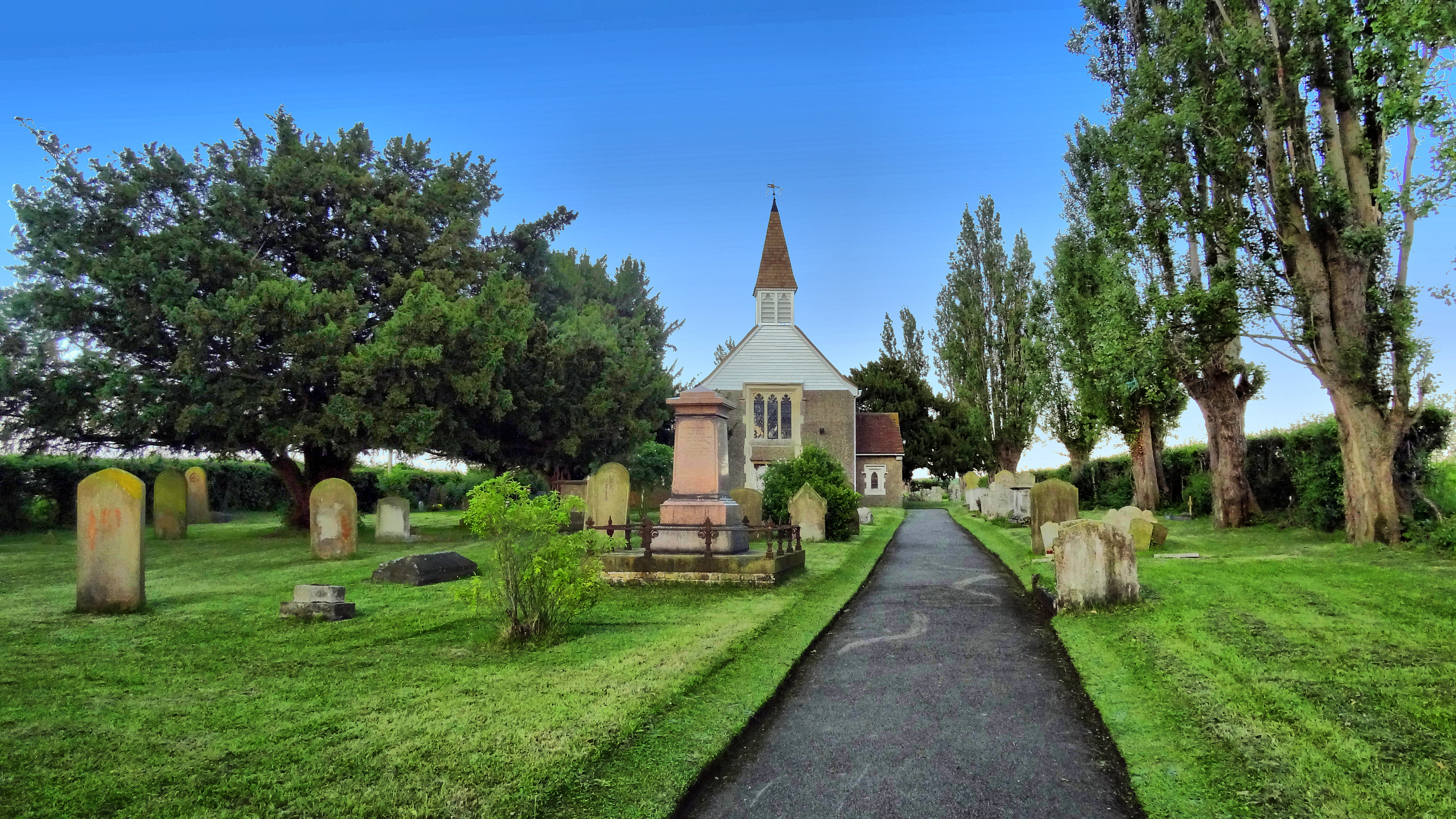
- Church of St Margaret

- Location within Kent
- Population: 7,221 (2011.Ward)
- District: Gravesham
- Shire county: Kent
- Region: South East
- Country: England
- Sovereign state: United Kingdom
- Post town: GRAVESEND
- Postcode district: DA12
- Police: Kent
- Fire: Kent
- Ambulance: South East Coast
- UK Parliament: Gravesham

Singlewell is an area and council ward south of Gravesend, in the Gravesham district, in the county of Kent, England.

There was previously a settlement named Ifield as explained below. Two separate settlements on either side of Watling Street, it is now separated by the A2 road and the Channel Tunnel Rail Link and bears little resemblance to its past. Singlewell Road leads from Gravesend town southwards to the A2, linking with Hever Court Road just to the north of the former site of the A2. The A2 was moved to the South in the 2000s, allowing a widening from three to four lanes in each direction. The carriageways were then turned into a parkland area.

Singlewell is one of the highest points in Gravesham, including Marling Cross, which forms the junction at Gravesend East on the A2, which is the highest point in the Borough.

The name Singlewell, originally Shinglewell – and not therefore referring to it having the only well in the district – and its eponymous ancient well with ancient origins has now come to mean the area now part of the built-up area of Gravesend. The well was filled in during World War I. The original Watling Street is now Hever Court Road and the nearby estate named after it was built in 1957. Hever Court itself was the original home of the medieval family who moved to Hever, Kent in 1331. Hever Court eventually became derelict and was demolished in 1952.

Ifield, once a large rural parish, is now a few houses south of the A2 road, and the tiny church of St Margaret, with Norman architecture included in its walls. The parish formed part of the Hundred of Toltingtrough, then Strood Rural District from 1894 and was abolished on 1 April 1935, split between Cobham and Gravesend, in the Municipal Borough of Gravesend. In 1931 the parish had a population of 114.

The George Inn is also in Hever Court Road: it was a favourite establishment of Gravesend residents in the 19th century, being within walking distance from the town; not too different from today, although there is also a Best Western hotel (the Manor); and the Gravesend South Premier Inn, both serving traffic on the A2 road.
