= Killick's Mill, Meopham =

Windmill in Kent, England

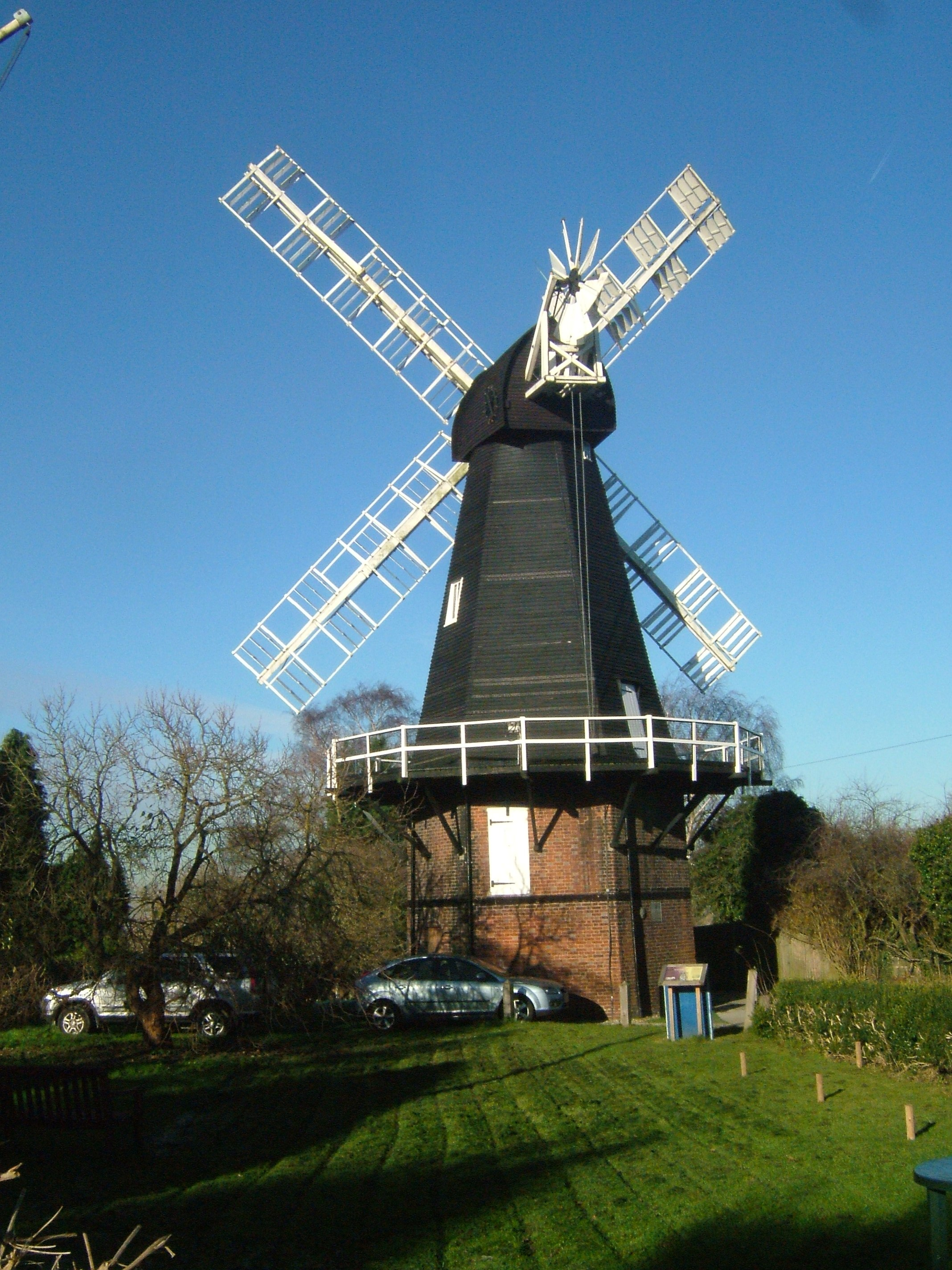
- Interactive map of Killick's Mill, Meopham

Origin
- Grid reference: TQ 6394 6518
- Coordinates: 51°21′43″N 0°21′12.5″E
- Operator: Kent County Council
- Year built: 1801

Information
- Purpose: Corn mill
- Type: Smock mill
- Storeys: Three-storey smock
- Base storeys: Two-storey base
- Smock sides: Six-sided
- No. of sails: Four
- Type of sails: Double Patent sails
- Windshaft: Cast iron
- Winding: Fantail
- Fantail blades: Six blades
- Auxiliary power: Oil engine
- No. of pairs of millstones: Four pairs

Killick's Mill is a Grade II* listed smock mill in Meopham, Kent, England that was built in 1801 and which has been restored.

== History ==
Killick's mill was built in 1801 by three brothers named Killick from Strood. Unusually, the mill is hexagonal in plan. Most smock mills are octagonal in plan. The mill was run by the Killick family until 1889 when it was sold to the Norton family. The mill last worked by wind in 1929, and then by oil engine and electric motor until the 1965. The mill was acquired by Kent County Council in 1960 and restored by E Hole and Sons, the Burgess Hill millwrights at a cost of £4,375.

== Description ==
Cross-section through mill

Killick's Mill is a three-storey smock mill on a two-storey single-storey brick base. There is a stage at second-floor level. It has four double patent sails carried on a cast-iron windshaft. The sails are 27 feet (8.23 m) long. The mill is winded by a fantail. The wooden Brake Wheel is 6 feet 6 inches (1.98 m) diameter. The Wallower and Great Spur Wheel are of cast iron. When the mill was built, it had two pairs of millstones. Later a third and then a fourth pair were added. One of the added pair of stones came from Richardson's mill, Boughton under Blean, as did the 15 horsepower (11 kW) auxiliary oil engine. The stones are driven overdrift. At one time, the mill generated its own electricity to power electric lights within the mill.

== Millers ==
- James Killick (1801–1823)
- Sukey Killick (1823–?)
- James Killick (1852–1889)
- Richard Killick (1882–1889)
- Thomas Killick (1882–1889)
- John Norton (1889–?)
- William Norton (1889–?)
- Leslie Norton (?–?)
- J & W Norton (1895–1950s)
- J & W Norton (Meopham) Ltd. (1950s–1965)

== Culture and media ==
Killick's Mill appeared briefly in stock footage used in an episode of The Prisoner titled The Girl Who Was Death which was filmed in 1967 and first shown in 1968.
