= James Edmeades =

English cricketer and British Army officer

Personal information
- Full name: James Frederick Edmeades
- Born: 18 July 1843; Nurstead, Kent, England
- Died: 6 February 1917 (aged 73); Northfleet, Kent, England
- Batting: Unknown
- Bowling: Unknown

Career statistics
Competition	First-class
Matches	1
Runs scored	26
Batting average	13.00
100s/50s	–/–
Top score	24
Balls bowled	12
Wickets	0
Bowling average	–
5 wickets in innings	–
10 wickets in match	–
Best bowling	–
Catches/stumpings	1/–
- Source: Cricinfo, 27 July 2020

James Frederick Edmeades MVO JP (8 July 1843 – 6 February 1917) was an English first-class cricketer and British Army officer, serving for 44 years in the army.

Born in Kent at Nurstead in July 1843, he was commissioned into the British Army as a cornet in the Queen's Own West Kent Yeomanry in May 1863, with promotion to lieutenant coming in the same month. Edmeades made a single appearance in first-class cricket for the Gentlemen of Kent against the Marylebone Cricket Club at Canterbury in 1866. Batting twice in the match, he was dismissed in the Gentlemen of Kent first innings for 24 runs by E. M. Grace, while in their second innings he was dismissed for 2 runs by Henry Arkwright. Edmeades' next military promotion came in December 1876, when he was promoted to captain. He was granted the honorary rank of major in May 1883, later gaining the full rank in November 1901. He was granted the honorary rank of lieutenant colonel in January 1902 and was made a Member of the Royal Victorian Order in August 1905. He resigned his commission in October 1907, retaining the honorary rank of lieutenant colonel. Later in life he was a justice of the peace for Kent. Edmeades died at Northfleet in February 1917.
