= Rochester Bridge railway station =

Disused railway station in Kent, England

Coordinates: 51°23′39″N 0°29′55″E

Rochester Bridge
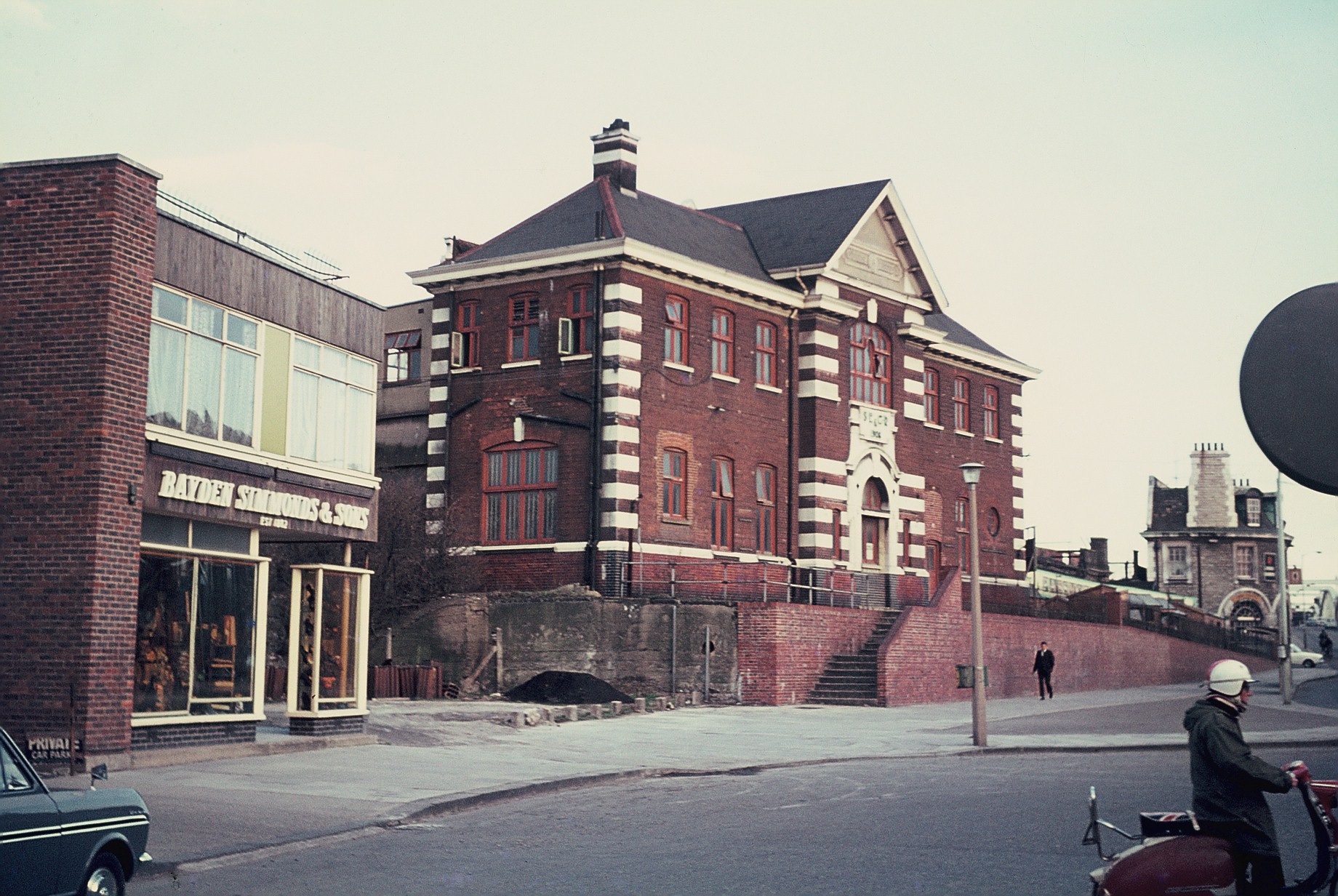

General information
- Location: Rochester, Borough of Medway; England
- Grid reference: TQ739690
- Platforms: 2

Other information
- Status: Disused

History
- Original company: London, Chatham and Dover Railway
- Pre-grouping: South Eastern and Chatham Railway

Key dates
- 3 Dec 1860: Opened as Strood
- 1 Apr 1861: Renamed Rochester Bridge
- 1 Nov 1861: Renamed Rochester and Strood
- Mar 1892: Renamed Rochester Bridge (Strood)
- Jan 1905: Renamed Rochester Bridge
- 1 Jan 1917: Closed
Location

Rochester Bridge railway station served Rochester and Strood in Kent, England.

It was opened as Strood by the London, Chatham and Dover Railway in 1860. After several name changes and the merger of the LC&DR into the South Eastern and Chatham Railway, it closed as Rochester Bridge in 1917. It lay derelict until it was demolished in the late 1960s in preparation for widening of the A2 road, which opened in 1970, its bridge of the River Medway using the piers of the southern span of the railway bridge.

| Preceding station | Disused railways | Following station |
|---|---|---|
| Sole Street; Line closed, station open | Chatham Main Line | Rochester; Line closed, station open |
