= Nurstead =

Coordinates: 51.391°N 0.357°E

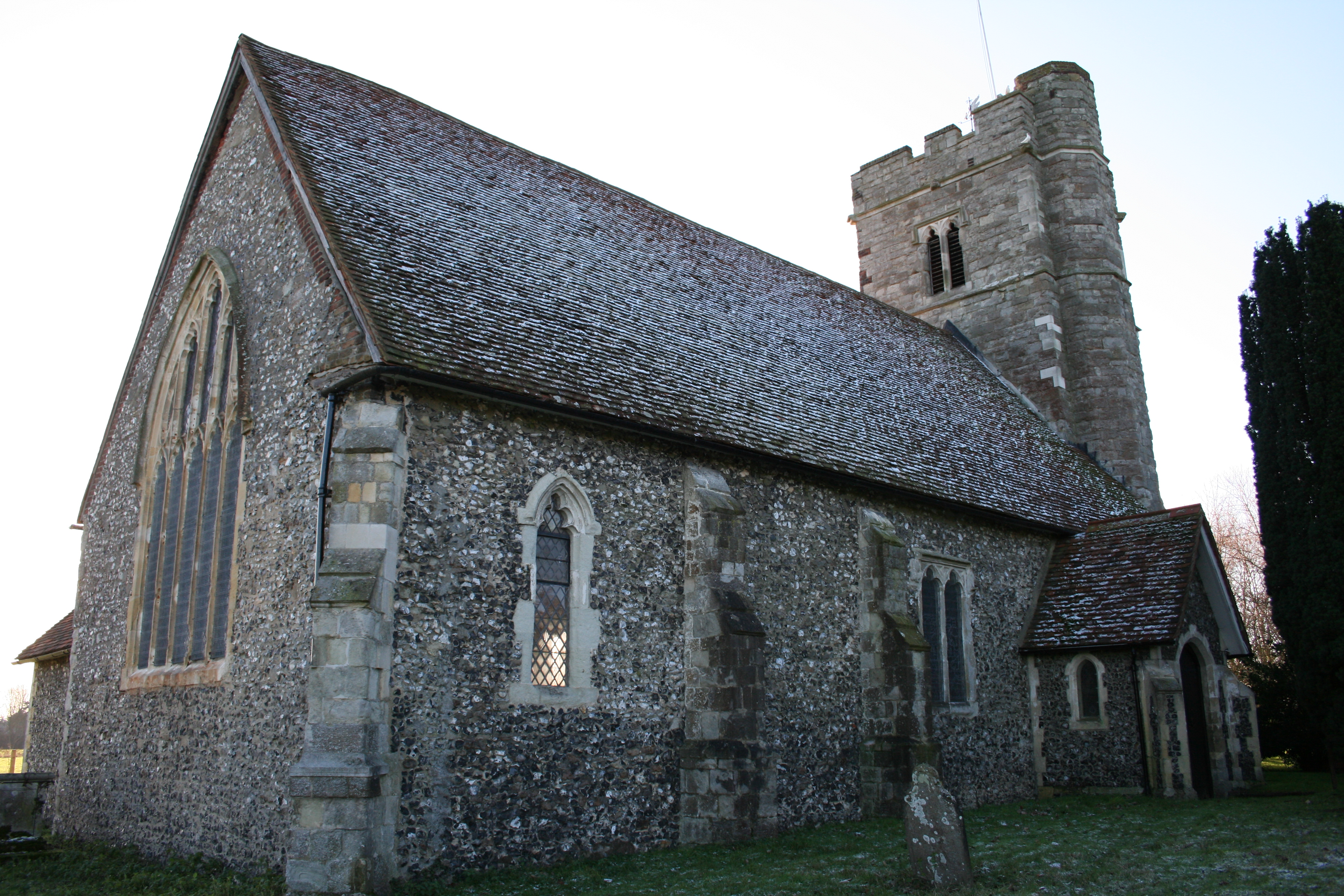
- The parish church of Nurstead, St Mildred's

- Location within Kent
- OS grid reference: TQ645655
- Civil parish: Meopham
- District: Gravesham
- Shire county: Kent
- Region: South East
- Country: England
- Sovereign state: United Kingdom
- Post town: Gravesend
- Postcode district: DA13
- Dialling code: 01474
- Police: Kent
- Fire: Kent
- Ambulance: South East Coast
- UK Parliament: Gravesham

Nurstead or Nursted is a locality, ecclesiastical parish and former civil parish, now in the parish of Meopham, in the Gravesham district, in the county of Kent, England. It is situated 3 miles south of Gravesend and ½ a mile north of Meopham.

The parish was in the Hundred of Toltingtrough in the Lathe of Aylesford in the county of Kent. It has an area of 522 acres.

The name of the parish was "Notestede" in the Domesday Book of 1086, but by the 18th century although formally spelled "Nutsted" it was at this time commonly called Nursted. On 1 April 1935 the parish was abolished and merged with Cobham.

It is at present in the civil parish of Meopham, which is divided into three wards, one of which bears the name "Hook Green and Nurstead".

Nurstead has a small 14th-century church, dedicated to Saint Mildred and this is still the church of the parish, although the benefice is united with Meopham. St Mildred's church is a listed building with walls of oblong flints.

A quarter of a mile north of the church is Nurstead Court, one of the most famous small medieval houses in the country.

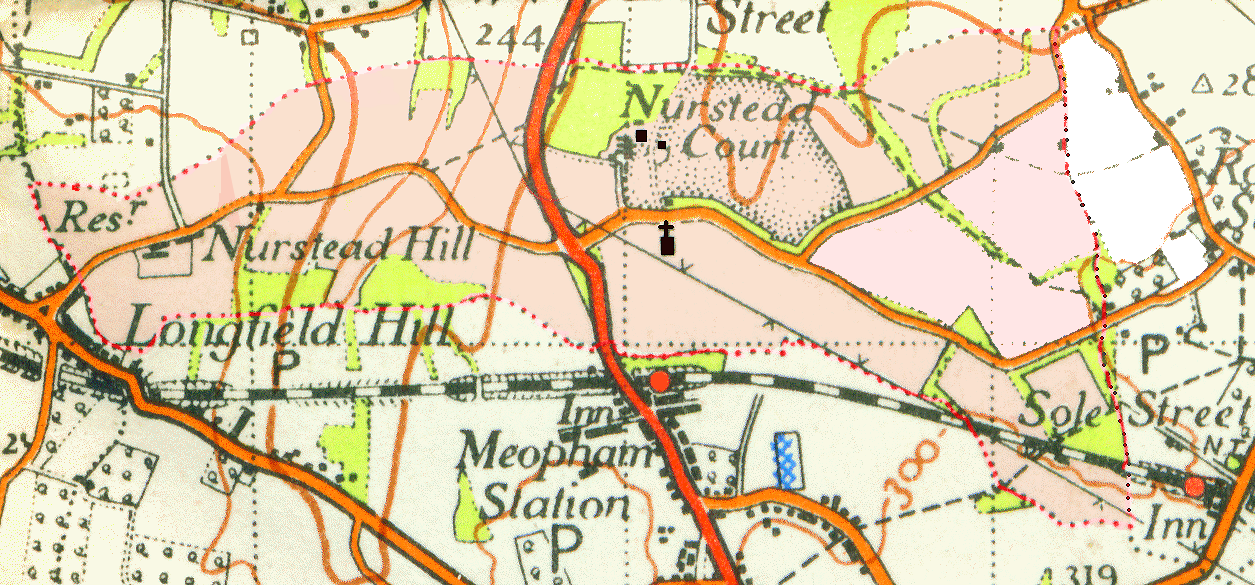
Nurstead showing former Civil Parish boundary

The civil parish was abolished in 1935 when it was united with Cobham and in 1963 it was transferred to Meopham. A minor exception was Zimmermans a private bungalow built between 1928 and 1930 on 3/4 acre of land purchased from Nurstead Court Estate. This land was next to the border with Cobham and was not transferred into Meopham in 1963, as indicated in 2000 when a boundary marker was erected on White Post Lane. The Sallows Shaw area south of that road also remained in Cobham.

Nurstead is a small parish, being not quite a mile in extent each way. It lies most of it on high ground, and has a great variety of soils, having in it arable, orchard, and hop ground, and some woodland towards the north boundary of it, next to Northfleet (formerly a parish and then an Urban District; it joins to Meopham southward. In 1797 there were but five houses in it, i.e.. Nurstead Court, Nurstead Hill Farm at the west end of the parish, and Copthall, at the east end, plus two cottages. Nurstead has a thriving village team in the grounds on Nurstead Court.

In 1931 the parish had a population of 39. In the following century and up until the abolition of the civil parish, the population remained low, as follows:

Date	Population
1811	29
1821	33
1831	38
1841	36
1851	34
1881	64
1891	56
1901	43
1911	48
1921	50
1931	39

== Notable people ==
- James Edmeades (1843–1917), cricketer and British Army officer
