= Ramsgate power station =

Former coal-fired power station

- Country: England
- Location: Ramsgate Kent
- Coordinates: 51°20′31″N 01°24′34″E
- Status: Decommissioned and demolished
- Construction began: 1904
- Commission date: 1905
- Decommission date: 1 April 1958
- Owners: Ramsgate and District Electric Supply Company, Edmundsons Electricity Corporation Limited (1904–1937); County of London Electric Supply Company (1937–1948); British Electricity Authority (1948–1955); Central Electricity Authority (1955–1957); Central Electricity Generating Board (1958)
- Operators: The Ramsgate and District Electric Supply Company Limited (1901–1948); British Electricity Authority (1948–1955); Central Electricity Authority (1955–1957); Central Electricity Generating Board (1958)

Thermal power station
- Primary fuel: Coal
- Turbine technology: Steam engines

Power generation
- Units operational: 90, 200 & 300 kW (1946)
- Nameplate capacity: 2 MW
- Annual net output: 1,660 MWh (1946)

Ramsgate power station supplied electricity to the town of Ramsgate, Kent, England and the surrounding area from 1905 to 1958. The station was operated by the Ramsgate and District Electric Supply Company Limited until the nationalisation of the British electricity supply industry in 1948. The coal-fired power station had a maximum electricity generating capacity of 2 MW.

== History ==
The Ramsgate and District Electric Supply Company Limited (incorporated in 1903) applied for a provisional order under the Electric Lighting Acts to generate and supply electricity to the town and local area. The Ramsgate Electric Lighting Order 1904 was granted by the Board of Trade and was confirmed by Parliament through the Electric Lighting Orders Confirmation (No. 3) Act 1904 (4 Edw. 7. c. clxxvi). The company built the Ramsgate power station (51°20′31″N 01°24′34″E) in Prince's Road, Ramsgate. This was adjacent to the corporation refuse destructor.

New plant was installed and the output of the power station was uprated to meet the increased demand for electricity.

In 1937 the County of London Electric Supply Company purchased the Ramsgate and District Electric Supply Company from Edmundsons Electricity Corporation. The Ramsgate Company's capital was £150,000.

The British electricity supply industry was nationalised in 1948 under the provisions of the Electricity Act 1947 (10 & 11 Geo. 6. c. 54). The Ramsgate electricity undertaking was abolished, ownership of the power station was vested in the British Electricity Authority, and subsequently the Central Electricity Authority and the Central Electricity Generating Board (CEGB). At the same time the electricity distribution and sales responsibilities of the Ramsgate electricity undertaking were transferred to the South Eastern Electricity Board (SEEBOARD).

Ramsgate power station was closed and decommissioned on 1 April 1958 by the CEGB and was subsequently demolished. The site is occupied by an electricity sub-station.

== Equipment specification ==
=== Plant in 1923 ===
By 1923 the generating plant comprised:

- Coal-fired boilers generating up to 20,400 lb/h (2.57 kg/s) of steam which was supplied to:
- Generators:
  - 1 × 90 kW steam reciprocating engine direct current (DC)
  - 1 × 200 kW steam reciprocating engine DC
  - 1 × 300 kW steam reciprocating engine DC

These machines gave a total generating capacity of 590 kW DC.

Electricity supplies available to consumers were at 480 and 240 Volts DC.

== Operations ==
=== Operating data 1921–23 ===
The electricity supply data for the period 1921–23 was:

Ramsgate power station supply data 1921–23
Electricity Use	Units	Year		
Electricity Use	Units	1921	1922	1923
Lighting and domestic	MWh	410	474	555
Public lighting	MWh	–	–	–
Traction	MWh	–	–	–
Power	MWh	143	151	178
Bulk supply	MWh	–	–	–
Total use	MWh	553	625	733

Electricity Loads on the system were:

Year		1921	1922	1923
Maximum load	kW	457	510	638
Total connections	kW	1,951	2,067	2,261
Load factor	Percent	20.5	19.5	17.8

Revenue from the sale of current (in 1923) was £19,649; the surplus of revenue over expenses was £10,048.

=== Operating data 1946 ===
In 1946 Ramsgate power station supplied 1,659 MWh of electricity; the maximum output load was 2,148 kW.

=== Operating data 1954–58 ===
Operating data for the period 1954–58 was:

Ramsgate power station operating data, 1954–58
Year	Running hours	Max output capacity MW	Electricity supplied MWh	Thermal efficiency percent
1954	1196	2	954	7.40
1955	674	2	757	7.25
1956	391	2	371	6.06
1957	629	2	618	7.16
1958	420	–	309	6.56

== See also ==
- Timeline of the UK electricity supply industry
- List of power stations in England
- Thanet power station
- Richborough power station
- Isle of Thanet Electric Tramways and Lighting Company
