= Broadstairs and St Peter's =

Civil parish in Kent, England

Coordinates: 51°21′51″N 1°25′51″E

Broadstairs and St Peters
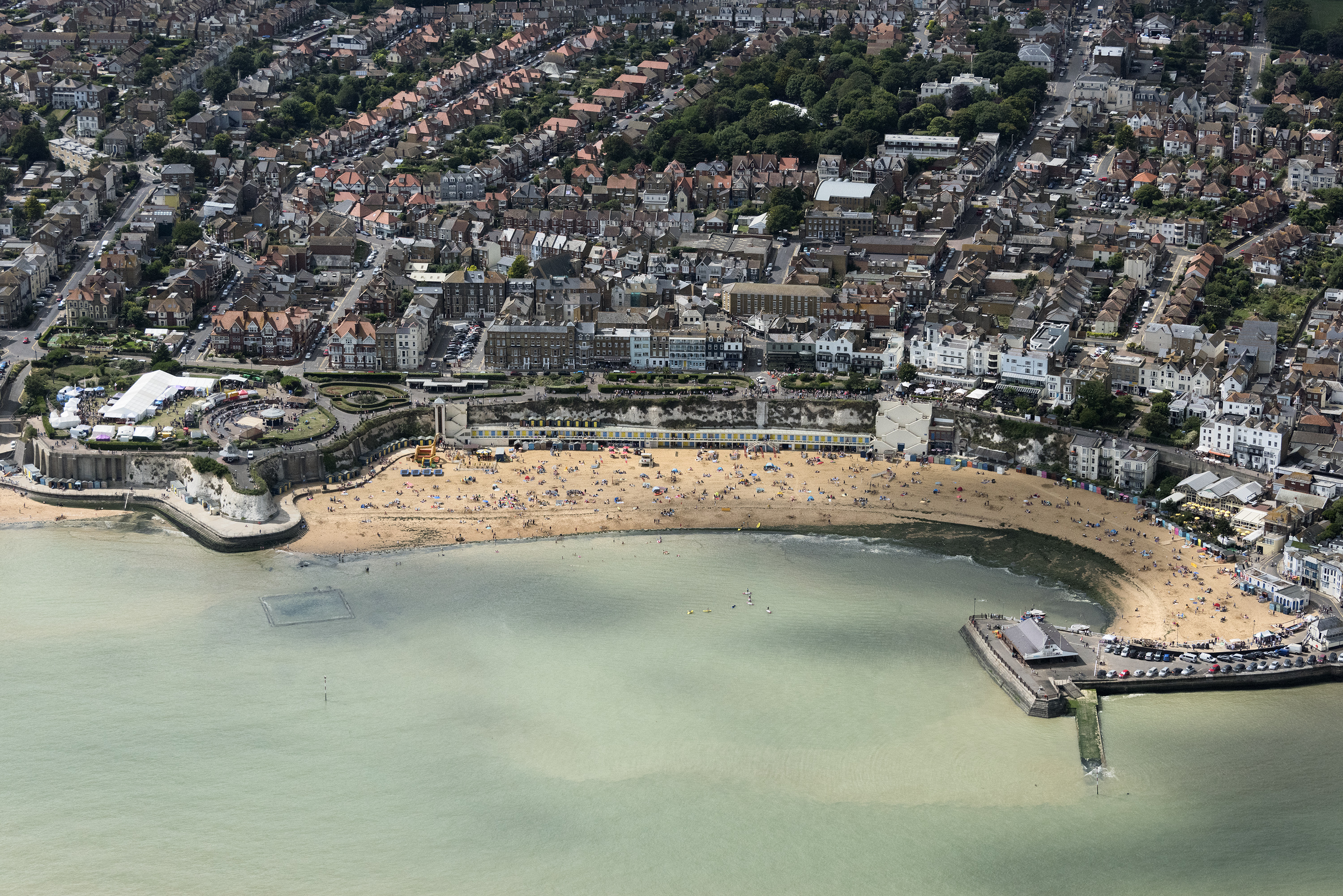
- Broadstairs aerial image

- Location within Kent
- Interactive map of Broadstairs and St Peters
- Population: 24,370 (2001 census)
- Civil parish: Broadstairs and St Peters
- District: Thanet
- Shire county: Kent
- Region: South East
- Country: England
- Sovereign state: United Kingdom
- Police: Kent
- Fire: Kent
- Ambulance: South East Coast
- Website: http://www.broadstairs.gov.uk

Broadstairs and St Peter's is a civil parish in the Thanet district of Kent, England. The parish comprises the settlements of Broadstairs, St Peter's and Westwood, including Westwood Cross. It is a successor parish, created in 1974 to replace Broadstairs and St Peter's Urban District. It is governed by Broadstairs and St Peter's Town Council. The population in 2001 was 24,370 in 10,594 households.

== Demography ==
Broadstairs and St Peter's
2001 UK census	Broadstairs and St Peter's	Thanet District	England
Total population	24,370	126,702	49,138,831
Foreign born	5.3%	5.1%	9.2%
White	98%	98%	91%
Asian	1.0%	0.6%	4.6%
Black	0.2%	0.3%	2.3%
Christian	75%	74%	72%
Muslim	0.4%	0.5%	3.1%
Hindu	0.3%	0.2%	1.1%
No religion	14%	16%	15%
65+ years old	24%	22%	16%
Unemployed	2.9%	4.4%	3.3%

At the 2001 UK census, the parish of Broadstairs and St Peter's had 24,370 residents in 10,597 households. Of those households, 34.2% were married couples, 6.7% were cohabiting couples and 8.3% were lone parents. 31.8% of all households were made up of individuals, and 20.9% had someone living alone at pensionable age. 25.7% of households included children aged under 16, or a person aged 16 to 18 who was in full-time education.

The parish has a low proportion of non-white people compared with national figures; the ethnicity recorded in the 2001 census was 97.9% white, 0.7% mixed race, 0.3% Chinese, 0.7% other Asian, 0.2% black and 0.2% other. The amount of foreign-born residents is relatively low; the place of birth of residents in 2001 was 94.7% United Kingdom, 0.7% Republic of Ireland, 0.5% Germany, 0.9% other Western Europe countries, 0.3% Eastern Europe, 0.8% Africa, 0.6% South Asia, 0.5% Far East, 0.3% North America, 0.2% Middle East, 0.2% Oceania and 0.1% South America. Religion was recorded as 75.3% Christian, 0.4% Muslim, 0.3% Hindu, 0.3% Buddhist and 0.3% Jewish. 14.3% were recorded as having no religion, 0.5% had an alternative religion and 8.6% did not state their religion.

The age distribution was 5% aged 0–4 years, 14% aged 5–15 years, 5% aged 16–19 years, 26% aged 20–44 years, 27% aged 45–64 years and 24% aged 65 years and over. There was a high percentage of residents over 65, compared with the national average of 16%. For every 100 females, there were 87.1 males.
