= Thanet power station =

Former coal-fired power station

- Country: England
- Location: St Peter's Broadstairs, Kent
- Coordinates: 51°22′12″N 1°25′09″E
- Status: Decommissioned
- Construction began: 1900
- Commission date: 1901
- Decommission date: 1964
- Owners: The Isle of Thanet Electric Tramways and Lighting Company Limited (1901–1924); Isle of Thanet Electric Supply Company Limited (1924–1948); British Electricity Authority (1948–1955); Central Electricity Authority (1955–1957); Central Electricity Generating Board (1958–1964)
- Operator: As owner

Thermal power station
- Primary fuel: Coal
- Turbine technology: Steam turbines
- Cooling towers: 3

Power generation
- Units operational: 1 x 1 MW, 1 x 2 MW, 1 x 3 MW
- Make and model: British Thomson-Houston
- Nameplate capacity: 6 MW
- Annual net output: 2,746 MWh (1923)

Thanet power station, also known as St. Peter's power station, supplied electricity to the towns of Broadstairs and Margate and other locations on the Isle of Thanet, Kent, England from 1901 to 1964. The station was owned and operated by the Isle of Thanet Electric Supply Company Limited until the nationalisation of the British electricity supply industry in 1948. The coal-fired power station had an ultimate electricity generating capacity of 6 MW.

== History ==
The Isle of Thanet Electric Tramways and Lighting Company Limited applied for a provisional order under the Electric Lighting Acts to generate and supply electricity for the tram system and to the local area. The Isle of Thanet Electric Lighting Order 1901 was granted by the Board of Trade and was confirmed by Parliament through the Electric Lighting Orders Confirmation (No. 7) Act 1901 (1 Edw. 7. c. clxxiv). The company built the power station in St. Peter's adjacent to the South Eastern and Chatham Railway (51°22′12″N 1°25′09″E) and in conjunction with the tramway depot.

From the inauguration of the Isle of Thanet Electric Tramways on 4 April 1901 the power station supplied electric current to the tram system. The trams were decommissioned on 27 March 1937, but the power station continued in operation supplying the area with electric current.

New plant was installed and the output of the power station was uprated to meet the increased demand over the period 1914 to 1926.

In 1924 the Isle of Thanet Electric Tramways and Lighting Company Limited changed its name to Isle of Thanet Electric Supply Company Limited. This better reflected the scope of its operations.

The British electricity supply industry was nationalised in 1948 under the provisions of the Electricity Act 1947 (10 & 11 Geo. 6. c. 54). The Isle of Thanet electricity undertaking was abolished, ownership of the power station was vested in the British Electricity Authority, and subsequently the Central Electricity Authority and the Central Electricity Generating Board (CEGB). At the same time the electricity distribution and sales responsibilities of the Isle of Thanet electricity undertaking were transferred to the South Eastern Electricity Board (SEEBOARD).

Thanet power station was decommissioned in 1964; superseded by 336 MW Richborough power station initially commissioned in 1962–3. This itself closed in 1996 and the site cleared by 2016.

== Equipment specification ==
=== Plant in 1923 ===
By 1923 the generating plant comprised:

- Coal-fired boilers generating up to 50,000 lb/h (6.3 kg/s) of steam which was supplied to:
- Generators:
  - 1 × 300 kW steam reciprocating engine AC
  - 1 × 500 kW steam reciprocating engine AC
  - 1 × 1,000 kW steam turbo-alternator AC
  - 1 × 2,000 kW steam turbo-alternators AC
  - 2 × 200 kW steam reciprocating engines DC

These machines gave a total generating capacity of 4,200 kW, comprising 3,800 kW of alternating current and 400 kW of direct current.

Electricity supplies available to consumers:

- DC at 480 and 240 Volts

Coal was delivered to the power station by a siding off the adjacent railway line.

=== Plant in 1954 ===
By 1954 the plant comprised:

- Boilers
  - 1 × 40,000 lb/h (5.0 kg/s) John Thompson chain grate boiler, steam conditions were 180 psi and 530 °F (12.4 bar and 277 °C)
  - 1 × 30,000 lb/h (3.78 kg/s) John Thompson chain grate boiler, steam conditions were 220 psi and 546 °F (15.2 bar and 286 °C), these supplied steam to:
- Generators
  - 1 × 1.0 MW British Thomson-Houston turbo-alternator
  - 1 × 2.0 MW British Thomson-Houston turbo-alternator
  - 1 × 3.0 MW British Thomson-Houston turbo-alternator

Cooling of the condensers was by two Davenport cooling towers with a total water circulation of 448,000 gallons per hour (0.566 m^{3}/s).

== Operations ==
=== Operating data 1921–23 ===
The electricity supply data for the period 1921–23 was:

Thanet power station supply data 1921–23
Electricity Use	Units	Year		
Electricity Use	Units	1921	1922	1923
Lighting and domestic	MWh	763	1,005	1,292
Public lighting	MWh	24	33	46
Traction	MWh	977	1,011	1,092
Power	MWh	219	261	269
Bulk supply	MWh	0	0	47
Total use	MWh	1,984	2,311	2,746

Electricity Loads on the system were:

Year		1921	1922	1923
Maximum load	kW	1,758	1,940	2,220
Total connections	kW	5,440	5,877	6,368
Load factor	Per cent	19.9	20.7	22.1

Revenue from the sale of current (in 1923) was £38,214; the surplus of revenue over expenses was £19,401.

=== Operating data 1946 ===
In 1946 Thanet power station supplied 1,395 MWh of electricity; the maximum output load was 2,945 kW.

=== Operating data 1954–63 ===
Operating data for the period 1954–63 was:

Thanet power station operating data, 1954–63
Year	Running hours or load factor (per cent)	Max output capacity (MW)	Electricity supplied (MWh)	Thermal efficiency
1954	851	4	1,878	7.59%
1955	755	4	1,731	7.21%
1956	702	4	1,507	6.24%
1957	706	4	1,641	6.84%
1958	505	4	1,090	7.08%
1961	7.0%	4	2,466	6.54%
1962	1.1%	4	379	4.99%
1963	3.68%	4	1,298	6.19%

== See also ==
- Timeline of the UK electricity supply industry
- List of power stations in England
- Ramsgate power station
- Thanet wind farm
