= St Peter's, Kent =

Area of Broadstairs, England

Coordinates: 51.3651°N 1.4191°E

St Peter's
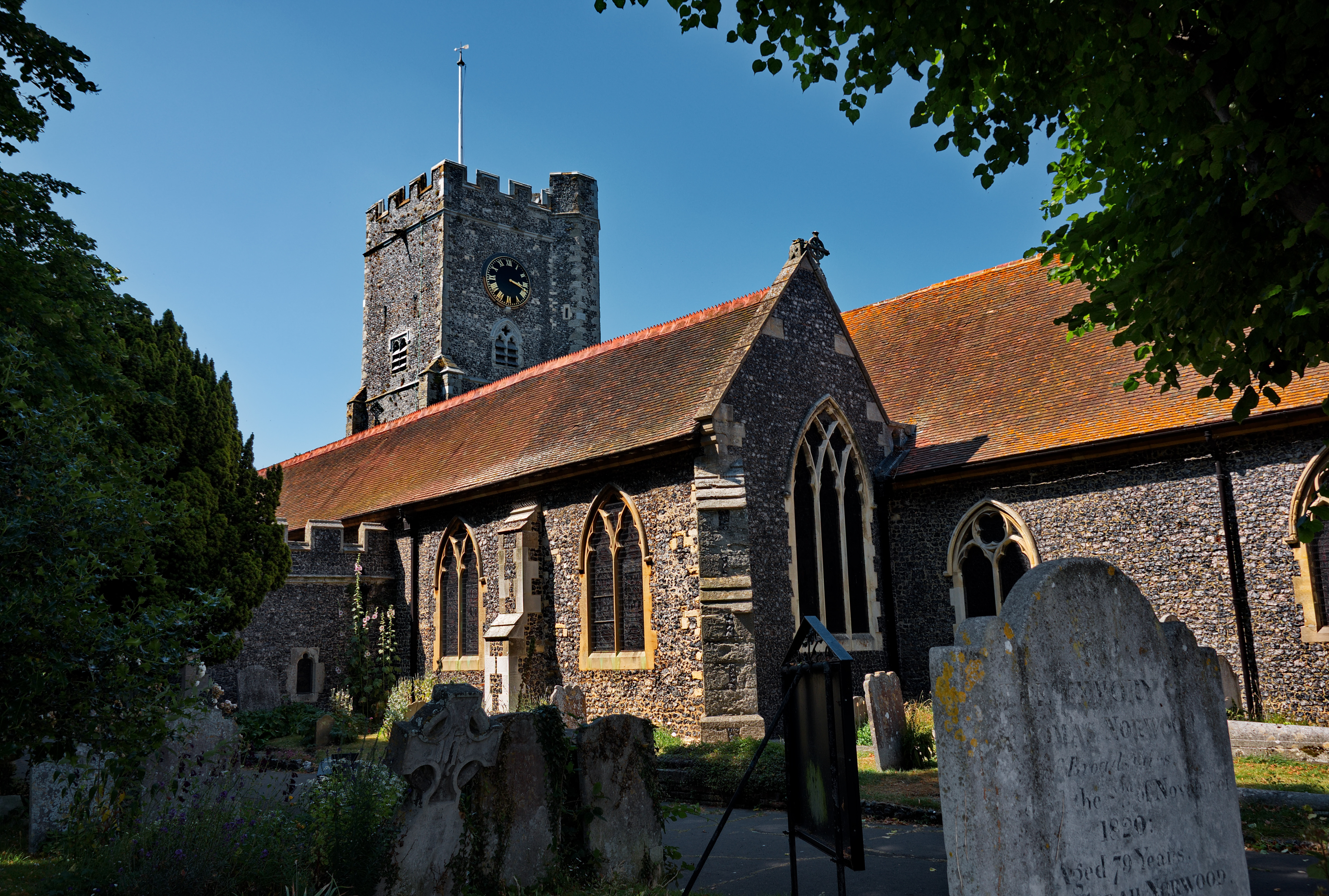
- St Peter's Church

- Location within Kent
- Population: 7,042 (2011.Ward)
- OS grid reference: TR381684
- Civil parish: Broadstairs and St Peter's
- District: Thanet
- Shire county: Kent
- Region: South East
- Country: England
- Sovereign state: United Kingdom
- Post town: BROADSTAIRS
- Postcode district: CT10
- Dialling code: 01843
- Police: Kent
- Fire: Kent
- Ambulance: South East Coast
- UK Parliament: East Thanet

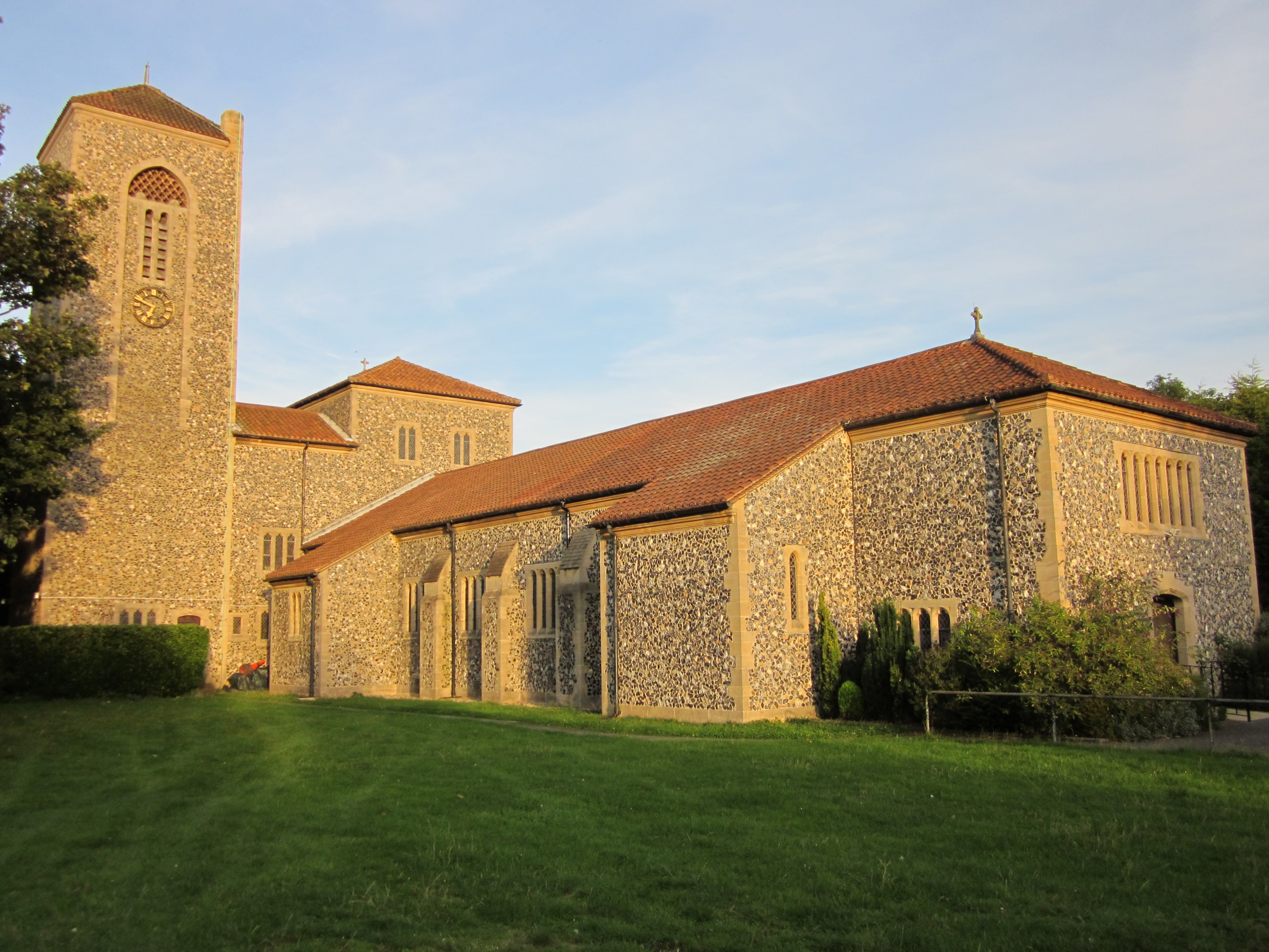
The Catholic Church of Our Lady Star of the Sea on Broadstairs Road is named after the Shrine of Our Lady above Broadstairs harbour.

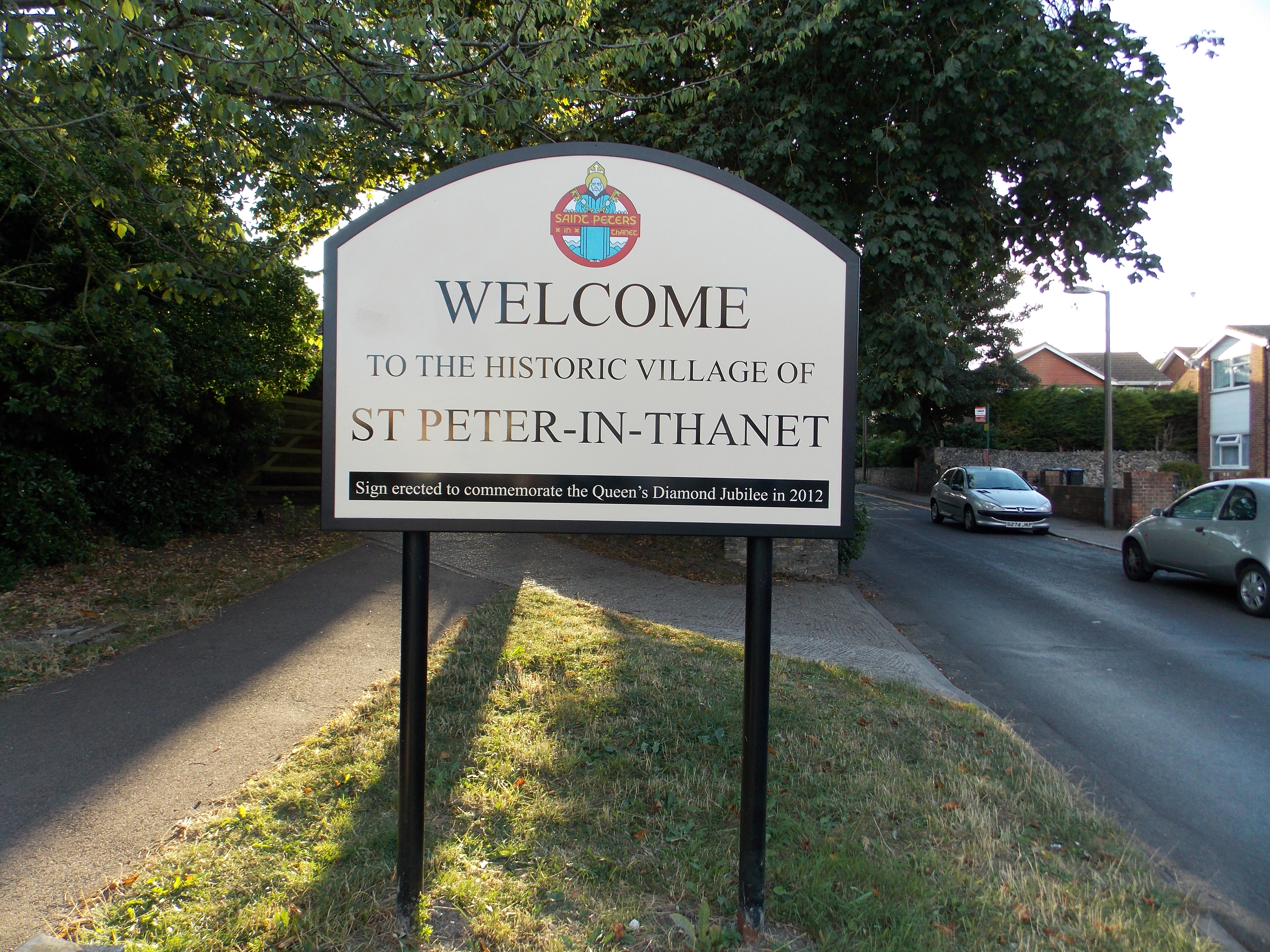
St Peter-in-Thanet road sign

St Peter's is an area of Broadstairs, in the civil parish of Broadstairs and St Peter's, on the Isle of Thanet, in Kent, England. Historically a village, it was outgrown by the long-dominant settlement of the two, Broadstairs, after 1841. Originally the borough or manor of the church of St. Peter-in-Thanet, it was said to be the largest parish east of London, at least until Broadstairs became a separate parish on 27 September 1850. The two settlements were formally merged administratively in 1894 with the formation of an Urban District Council.

== History ==
The village and its church, named after Saint Peter, was the second daughter church of Minster and was established at about the time of the Norman conquest. (Note: The Doomsday Book records two churches assigned to the Archbishop of Canterbury at Minster and one assigned to St Augustine's Abbey in both 1066 and 1086. Thanet was laid waste by William shortly after the conquest to prevent its use as a base for a further invasion by the Danes. While Wootten gives a date of 1070, other dates of about then are given by others, or potential sources remain silent. In 1070 both a new Archbishop of Canterbury and a new Abbott for St Augustine's Abbey were appointed by William the Conqueror with the lands in Thanet remaining unchanged, so presumably Thanet was no longer laid waste. The churches in Thanet of Norman times as detailed in other sources are the mother church of St. Mary’s, Minster, and the three chapels of ease of which the other two are St. John’s Church, Margate and St. Lawrence Church, Ramsgate. These later two both claim to have been founded before the conquest. So it is possible that it became the second church of Minster-in-Thanet sometime after 1086.) although the first written record of its present name dates to 1124 as a chapel of ease to Minster in Thanet Priory, overseen by Archbishop of Canterbury, and it became a parish church in 1200.

In 1254 the village was named "scī Petr'", which gradually changed to "scī Petri" by 1270, Sti Petri in Insula de Thaneto by 1422, and finally settling by 1610 on its current form of St Peter's. The then church steeple was damaged by an earthquake in 1580. The church has the right to fly the White Ensign, dating from when the church tower was used as a signalling station in the Napoleonic Wars. The village sign won first prize in a nationwide competition in 1920. Edward Heath, leader of the Conservative Party and prime minister from 1970 to 1974, was born in the village in 1916. On 27 April 1952 a United States Air Force Republic F-84 Thunderjet from RAF Manston crashed in the main street, killing three including the pilot.

In 1894 the civil parish was abolished and split with the rural part becoming St Peter Intra and the part in Broadstairs Urban District becoming St Peter Extra. On 1 April 1914 St Peter became a parish again, on 1 April 1935 the parish was abolished to form "Broadstairs and St Peters", part also went to Ramsgate and Margate. In 1931 the parish had a population of 12,745.

== Demography ==
St Peter's compared
2001 UK Census	St Peter's ward	Thanet borough	England
Population	6,761	126,702	49,138,831
Foreign born	4.3%	5.1%	9.2%
White	97.8%	97.7%	90.9%
Asian	1.2%	0.9%	4.6%
Black	0.2%	0.3%	2.3%
Christian	75.7%	73.6%	71.7%
Muslim	0.3%	0.5%	3.1%
Hindu	0.3%	0.2%	1.1%
No religion	14%	15.9%	14.6%
Unemployed	2.8%	4.4%	3.3%
Retired	19.2%	17.5%	13.5%

At the 2001 UK census, the St Peter's electoral ward had a population of 6,761. The ethnicity was 97.8% white, 0.7% mixed race, 1.2% Asian, 0.2% black and 0.1% other. The place of birth of residents was 95.7% United Kingdom, 0.7% Republic of Ireland, 0.9% other Western European countries, and 2.7% elsewhere. Religion was recorded as 75.7% Christian, 0.5% Buddhist, 0.3% Hindu, 0% Sikh, 0.1% Jewish, and 0.3% Muslim. 14% were recorded as having no religion, 0.4% had an alternative religion and 8.6% did not state their religion.

The economic activity of residents aged 16–74 was 38% in full-time employment, 13.6% in part-time employment, 9% self-employed, 2.8% unemployed, 2.2% students with jobs, 3.9% students without jobs, 19.2% retired, 5.7% looking after home or family, 3.3% permanently sick or disabled and 2.3% economically inactive for other reasons. The industry of employment of residents was 16.1% retail, 14.9% manufacturing, 7.2% construction, 9.3% real estate, 13.2% health and social work, 12.1% education, 7.3% transport and communications, 5.5% public administration, 4.7% hotels and restaurants, 2.5% finance, 1% agriculture and 6.2% other. Compared with national figures, the ward had a relatively high proportion of workers in education and health and social work. There were a relatively low proportion in agriculture, real estate and finance. Of the ward's residents aged 16–74, 15.5% had a higher education qualification or the equivalent, compared with 19.9% nationwide.
