= Botany Bay, Kent =

Bay in Kent, England

Coordinates: 51°23′20″N 1°26′5″E

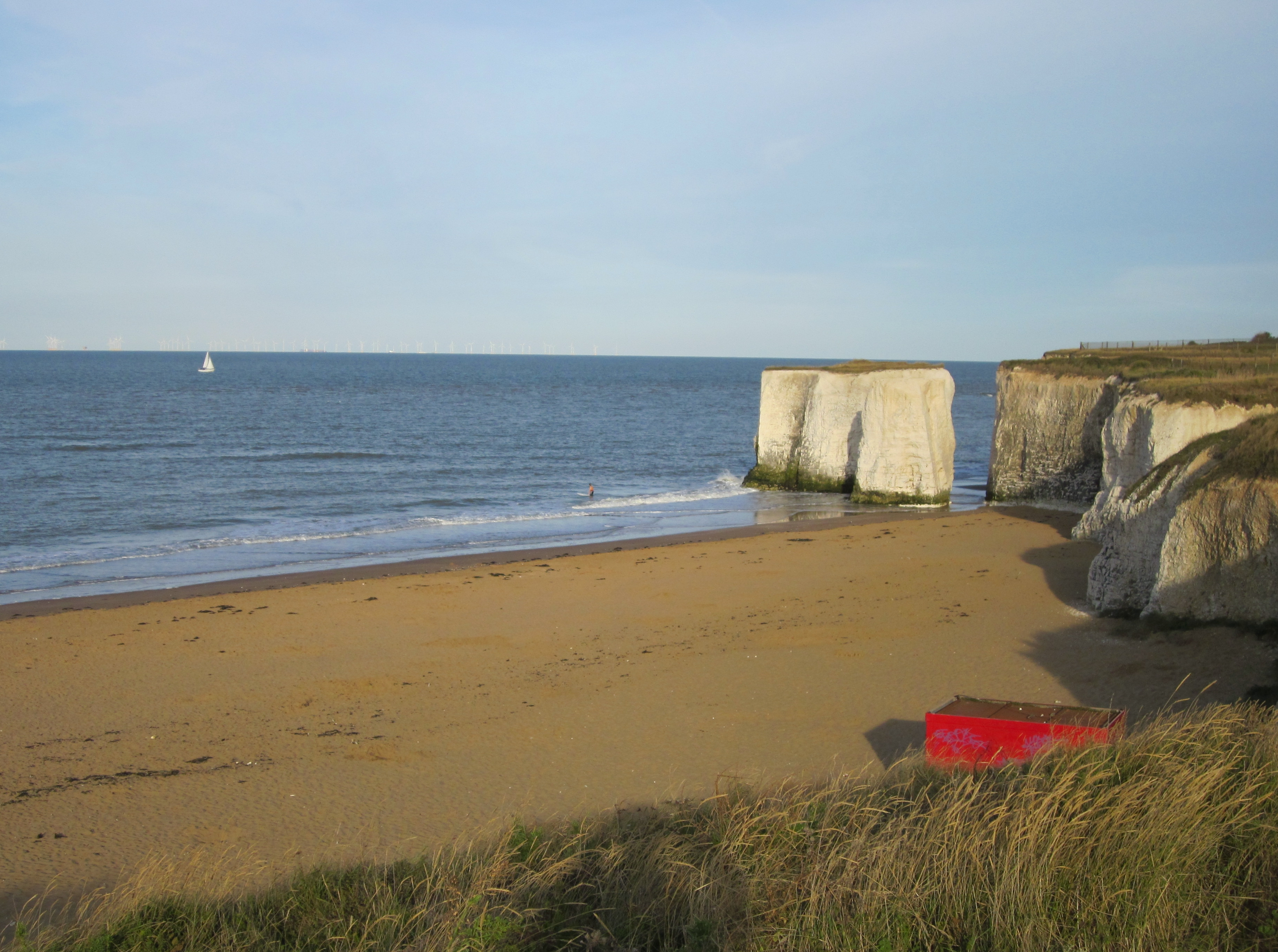
Looking southeast across the bay. The Thanet Wind Farm can be seen on the horizon.

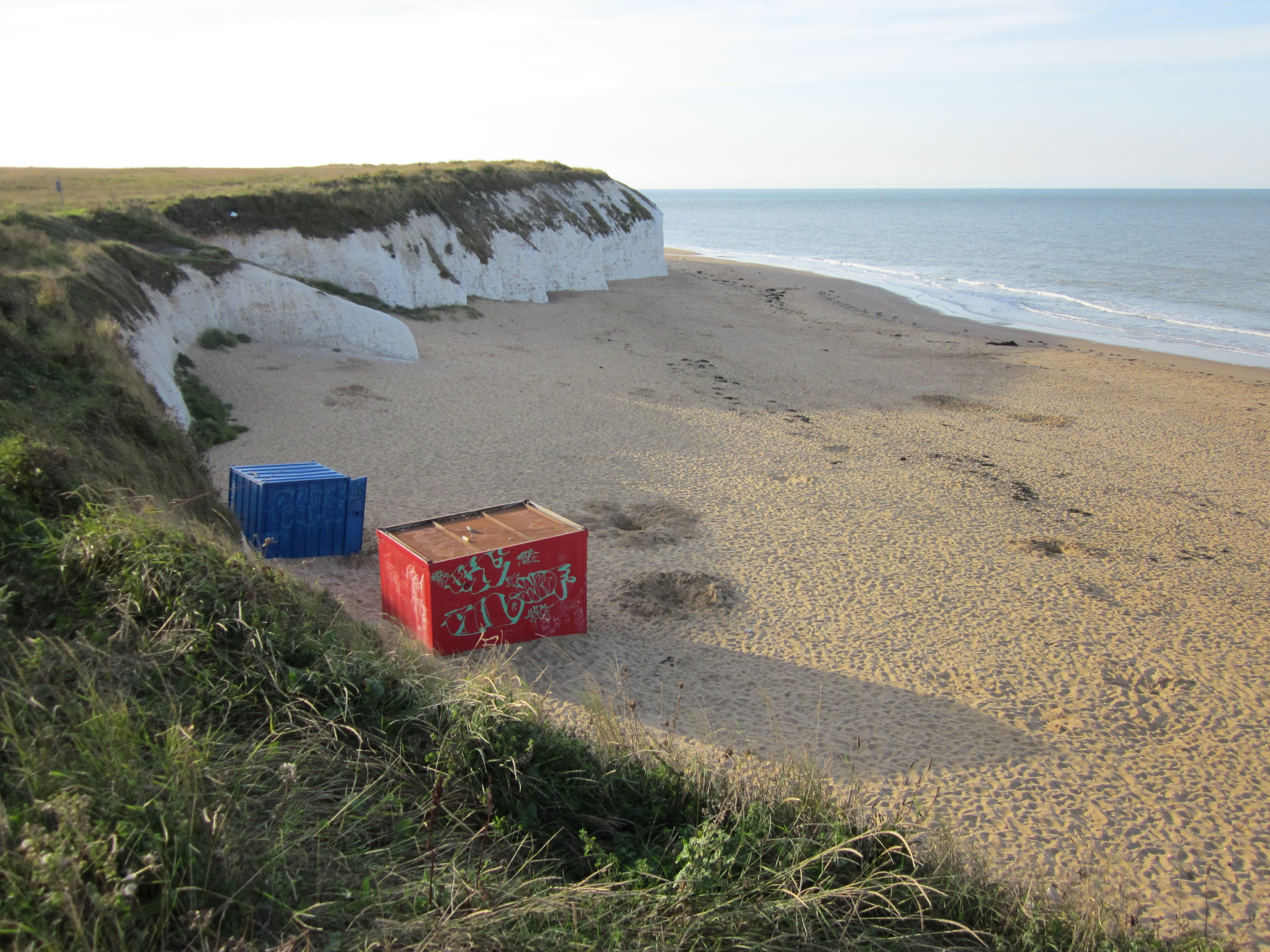
Looking northwest across the bay.

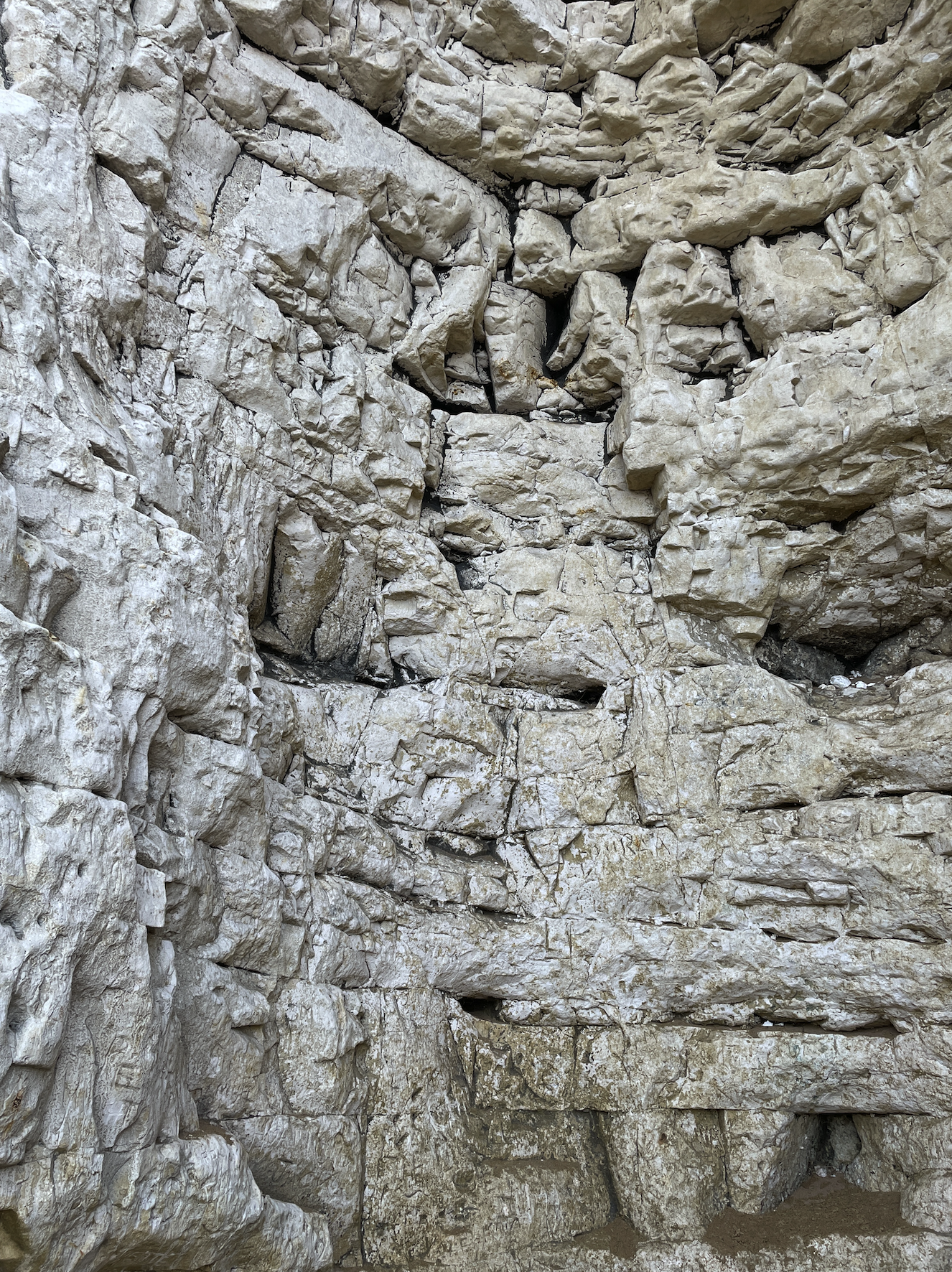
Detail of chalk stack, across the eastern side of the beach.

Botany Bay is a bay in Broadstairs facing the north sea, Kent, England. Botany Bay is the northernmost of seven bays in Broadstairs. The bay features chalk cliffs, formerly a sea stack and is a popular tourist location. Bathing is reportedly safe for swimming, surfing, and kayaking, and lifeguards are on duty from May 25 to September 1 (2024 dates).

== Use ==
Botany Bay is a popular film location, having been used by productions such as BBC's D- Day: The Last Heroes, Tamil action drama Thaandavam, Sky Atlantic comedy Hunderby, BBC drama True Love as well as music videos for Bat For Lashes, Bebe Black, Shawn Mendes' song "There's Nothing Holdin' Me Back", and commercials for Land Rover, Sainsburys and Natwest and photoshoots for many fashion editorials. "Dress Code" an episode from the web series, The Mute Series, was also shot there. In the 2020s, Botany Bay became popular with day-trippers from London. This led to an increase in rubbish being left on the beach, which local councillors attributed to Londoners. In 2024, the sea stack collapsed due to natural costal erosion.

== Naturists ==
The Foreness area at the western end of the beach is popular with naturists, although the area does not have official designation as a naturist beach despite media outlets claiming it does. Thanet District Council has considered putting signs to inform or warn non-naturists of the possibility of encountering naturists, although at present there is no signage.
