= Broadstairs =

Coastal town in Kent, England

Coordinates: 51.35888°N 1.43944°E

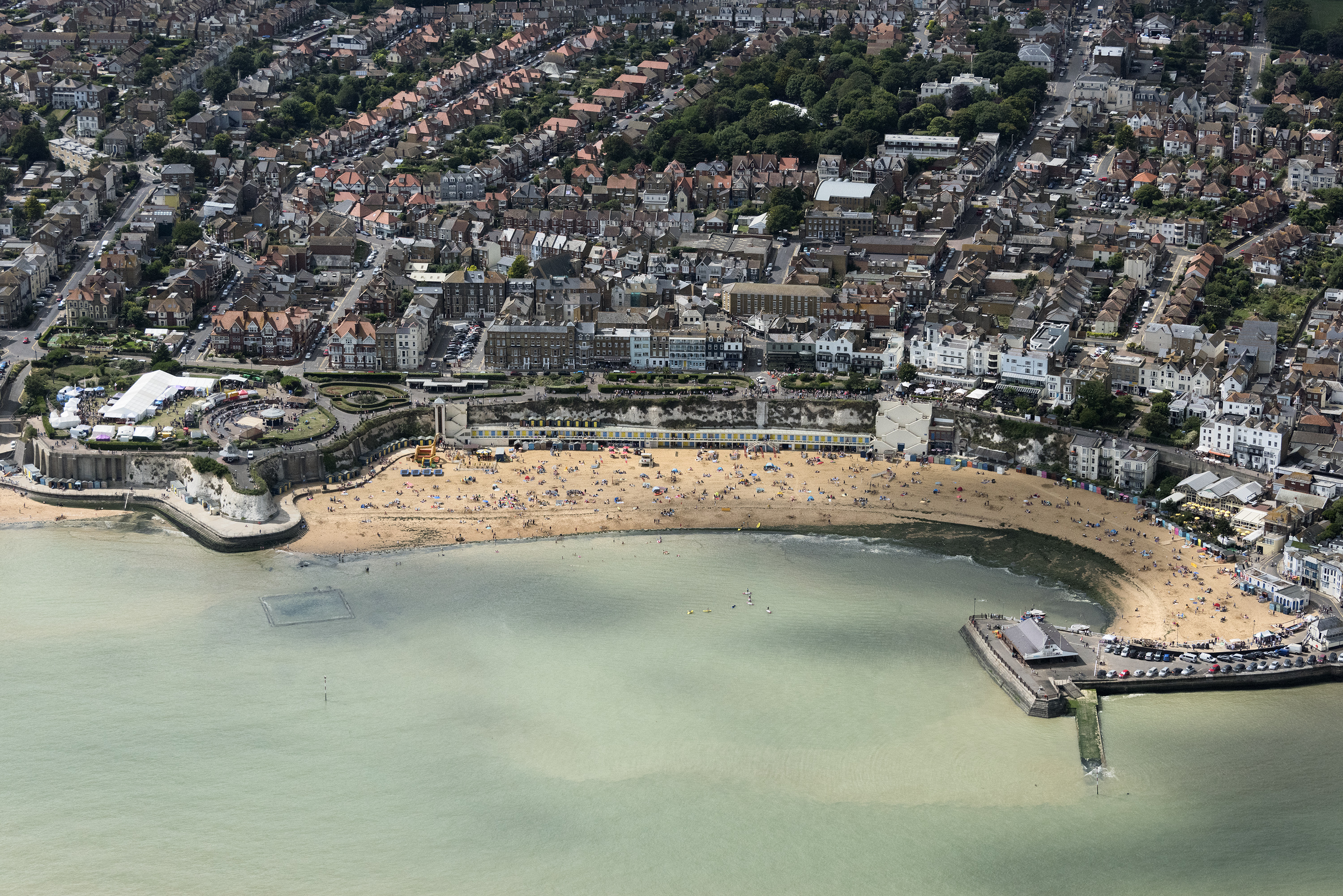
- Viking Bay, Broadstairs

- Location within Kent
- Population: 24,903 (Broadstairs and St Peter's parish 2011)
- OS grid reference: TR395675
  - London: 81.6 miles (131.3 km)
- Civil parish: Broadstairs and St Peter's
- District: Thanet
- Shire county: Kent
- Region: South East
- Country: England
- Sovereign state: United Kingdom
- Post town: Broadstairs
- Postcode district: CT10
- Dialling code: 01843
- Police: Kent
- Fire: Kent
- Ambulance: South East Coast
- UK Parliament: East Thanet

Broadstairs (/ˈbrɔːdstɛərz/) is a coastal town on the Isle of Thanet in the Thanet district of east Kent, England, about 80 miles (130 km) east of London. It is part of the civil parish of Broadstairs and St Peter's, which includes St Peter's, and had a population in 2011 of about 25,000. Situated between Margate and Ramsgate, Broadstairs is one of Thanet's seaside resorts, known as the "jewel in Thanet's crown". The town's coat of arms' Latin motto is Stella Maris ("Star of the Sea"). The name derives from a former flight of steps in the chalk cliff, which led from the sands up to the 11th-century shrine of St Mary on the cliff's summit.

The town spreads from Haine Road in the west to Kingsgate (named after the landing of King Charles II in 1683), a hamlet in St Peter parish in the north, and to Dumpton in the south. The hamlet of Reading (formerly Reden or Redyng) Street is noted for dwellings with Flemish gable ends.

== History ==
=== 11th century to 13th century ===
The inland village of St Peter's appears indirectly to have been established with the associated building of what became a parish church by the time of the Norman Conquest. (Note: This is indirect evidence via the Doomsday Book which documents three churches on the Isle of Thanet at this time.) The church is first documented by name in 1124 as a chapel of ease to Minster in Thanet Priory, overseen by Archbishop of Canterbury, and became a parish church in 1200. The coastal confederation of Cinque Ports during its mediaeval period included St Peter's, as a 'limb' of Dover. On the nearby coast was a cliff-top shrine, the Shrine of Our Lady, at what was then called Bradstow(e), meaning "broad place" (perhaps referring to the wide bay).

=== 14th century and 15th century ===
St Peter's is divided at a 1317 trial of the Abbott of St Augustine's Abbey into a northborough and southborough. In 1393 Richard II asked the Abbott of St Augustine's to aid the restitution of a trendle of wax removed from a plundered ship and now held by two named men of St. Peters. In 1424 the earlier grant of Thanet to the Abbey of St Augustine in a now lost document of 1027 is confirmed.

=== 16th century and 17th century ===
A man resident in St Peters is arrested in Ramsgate for failing to take the oath of renunciation of papal authority. In 1538, the road leading to the seafront, known as Harbour Street, was cut into the rough chalk ground on which Broadstairs is built, by George Culmer. Going further in defence of the town, he built Flint Gate in 1540, a portal that still spans Harbour Street and which then held two heavy wooden doors that could be closed in times of threat from the sea. The fishery in Broadstairs saw exports of cod to Iceland before 1594. A map of 1596 has the name Brod Stayers for Broadstairs and Domptons Baye for Dumpton Gap.. In 1646, a petition was put forth by fishermen in Broadstairs, Margate and Ramsgate for a convey and protection while fishing for herrings.

=== 18th century ===
Smuggling was a large crime and resulted in the Battle Of Botany Bay at Kingsgate in 1769, which saw the smuggling gang of John Snelling ambushed by Revenue Patrol. The patrol saw ten of the gang members killed and eight captured.

The bathing machine was introduced to Broadstairs in 1754. An old hotel building in Broadstairs is the Phoenix Inn built in 1760 now part of the Royal Albion Hotel. The building that became in due course the Captain Digby pub was part of developments on the seaside Thanet estate of Lord Holland between 1763 and 1768. The construction of Pierremont Hall was over seen in 1785 by Samuel Pepys Cockerell for Thomas Douglas Forsyth. For being built in such a remote place it was also known as Forsyth's Folly. The initial wooden pier had been destroyed three times by storms in 1763, 1767 and 1774. The pier and harbour of Broadstairs were repaired and rebuilt from 1791. This was supported by a public Act of Parliament that was signed in 1792 by George III to repair and rebuild the pier adjoining the harbour of Broadstairs.

By 1795, Flint Gate was restored by Lord Hellkier to repel any threat from the French Revolutionary Wars and renamed York Gate after the Duke Of York. In the same year, the first lightvessel was placed on the Goodwin Sands. Also in 1795 the present flint walled Brown Jug pub just within Broadstairs near Dumpton Park commenced treading as The Queen’s Arm Tap. The following year, Princess of Wales was launched at Broadstairs as a Margate hoy. Irish Melesina Trench, poet and writer, came to visit Broadstairs in 1798 for the summer. During the 18th century, the cod fishery that had brought trade from Iceland was destroyed during war with France.

In 1837 it was reported that in the 18th century the finest Indiamen came from Broadstairs shipyards.

=== 19th century ===
Broadstairs, Kent. Drawn by Geo. Shepherd. Published in 1828-30 in the History of Kent by W. H. Ireland.

As threat of Napoleon Bonaparte grew in 1803, requests for the number of carronades were made for the vessels at Broadstairs and Ramsgate. A total of 253 Sea Fencibles were deployed along the coasts of Broadstairs and the surronding Ramsgate and Sandwich. His Majesty's Ship (HMS) Monarch was sent off the coast of Broadstairs and sent reports to (HMS) ships at in North Sea. An act was signed by George III for the repair and rebuild of the pier adjoining to the harbour in 1806 and plans for an eastern battery were made the next year.

A tragedy in 1820 resulted in a ship from Broadstairs sinking off the North Foreland and resulting in the deaths of six of all the crewmen onboard. In 1824, the Royal Paddle Steamer was established between Broadstairs and Margate, with rides between the two free of cost. The young Princess Victoria and her mother, the Duchess of Kent, were summer visitors 1826–1836, staying at Pierremont Hall. By 1830 traditional smuggling to evade customs and excise duties had ended. In 1834, Broadstairs was described as attractive and fashionable and saw the arrival of 13 families in July of that year. Throughout the 1830’s and 1840’s, Broadstairs became a favoured seaside retreat to Charles Dickens as he resided in Bleak House. The arrival of wealthier families was highlighted in 1842 in the newspapers.

“Broadstairs has undergone a greater change in its character as a watering place during the last few years than any other perhaps that can be mentioned. From an animated little place, frequented by a number of genteel families which formed a social and agreeable society with one another, it has now become a quiet hospital for invalids and a nursery for children.”

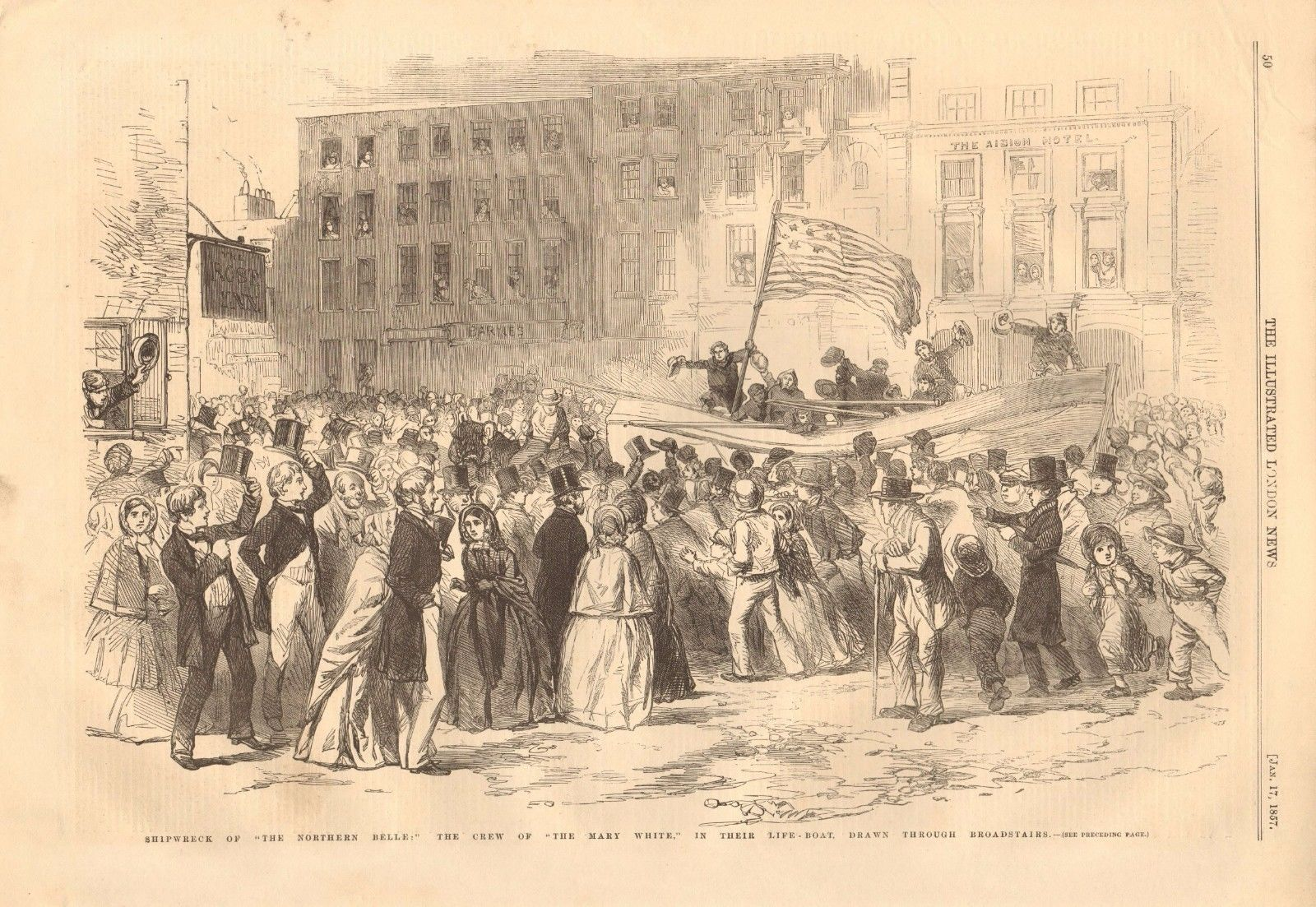
The crew of the "Mary White" in their life-boat drawn through Broadstairs, on 6 January 1857

Lifeboats arrived in Broadstairs in 1851, and saw its first use on 6 March 1851, when the brig Mary White became trapped on the Goodwin Sands during a severe gale blowing from the north. A ballad was written to celebrate the occasion, "Song of the Mary White". Broadstairs' lifeboats were further supported by a fund established in the 1860s by Sir Charles Reed FSA. Broadstairs was not directly served by the railways until 1863. Rail access to Broadstairs had previously relied heavily upon coach links to other railway stations in the district or region; with firms such as Bradstowe Coachmasters, operated by William Sackett and John Derby.

During 1882, a Provisional Order was made for the improvement and regulation of the harbour and pier as royal assent was granted for a proposed new pier in the same year. Cases of diphtheria were reported in Broadstairs by Dr R Bruce Low in 1894. In 1899, the previous residence of Charles Dickens, Bleak House was put under sale for auction. Due to the fresh sea air, many convalescent homes for children opened towards the end of the 19th century.

=== 20th century ===
Jetty and harbour at Broadstairs in Kent, England. Postcard at or pre-1914 by postal date. Photographer unknown; publisher JMS

In February 1900, William Joseph Lurchboard, secretary and manager of Broadstairs Gas Company was charged with embezzlement of funds and put on bail for 1’000 pounds. Storms began to rage on south east of Kent on the following November and saw lifeboats from Broadstairs sent out to rescue ships along the coast. In 1903, a story from a trip to Broadstairs was written in the newspaper. ‘The afternoon was spent - searching for shells and crabs, which we found in abundance. I was greatly afraid of crabs, but Willie soon learned to handle them without fear of being nipped.’ Along Victoria Parade, Morelli's Gelato company was founded in 1907.

Parcels were dispatched from Broadstairs in 1915 to twenty local soldiers on the front line. Yarrow home was offered to the military and served as a military hospital before annexed by Granville Canadian Hospital in 1916. Ten of Convalescent homes established in the late 19th century were used as military hospitals during the first world war. Four bombs dropped near a local school in 1916 by German seaplanes and shattered the glass. Though there were no casualties, three were injured.

1920. The 'Lusitania' Raft on Broadstairs Pier.

Bombs were dropped by enemy planes in January 1917 and guns were mounted along Northfleet for defence. In Reading Street on 28 February 2017 a mother and her two daughters were killed. Further attacks came on the following May as shells were fired at both Broadstairs and Ramsgate. Twelve homes were hit in the crossfire with two civilian deaths. A claim of war damage was made against Germany for the losses, which amounted to £60,000. A war memorial war built in 1923 to commemorate 159 local servicemen who died fighting.

An outbreak of poliomyelitis hit in October 1926, resulting in a number of cases of flaccid paralysis. At the beginning, the illness was mistaken for sleep sickness by local newspapers. The spread was most prominent among young people, and 44.6% of the cases were aged between 10 and 14. As a means of controlling the spread, those infected were placed into isolation while receiving treatment in hospital. Local boarding schools, which saw a high number of cases, were placed into quarantine as a further precaution. In total, there were 53 cases and two deaths.

Though first thought and discussed a year earlier, Broadstairs sailing club was offically formed in 1936 by Harry Dipple and held boat races.

During World War II, damage resulted from 278 high explosive and 300 incendiary bombs, including two V-1 flying bombs, with seven civilian deaths and over 3000 buildings damaged, with 17 unrepairable.

On the 28 July 1949 a replica Viking longboat that had been rowed from Denmark to Broadstairs to commemorate the landing of Hengist and Horsa nearby at Eopwinesfleot in 449, was greeted by the then Crown Prince of Denmark, Prince Georg and a crowd of 30,000. Broadstairs main bay was renamed as Viking Bay that year.

A Thunderjet crashed in the High Street of St Peters on the 27 April 1952, resulting in three deaths and significant property damage at a time when many locals were attending a nearby church service. Later that same year, on 20 November 1952 a Tiger Moth crashed into a back garden, after hitting the North Foreland wireless mast.

== Governance ==
Broadstairs is within the Thanet local government district. The town contains the five electoral wards of Bradstowe, St Peter's, Beacon Road, Viking and Kingsgate. These wards have eleven of the fifty six seats on the Thanet District Council. The 2023 local elections saw major changes in the political make-up of Broadstairs, with the Conservative Party retaining only four of their previously held eight seats. Four seats were won by the Labour Party, two by the Greens, with an Independent taking the remaining seat. Broadstairs and St Peter's Town Council has 15 members, who are elected every four years, led by the mayor.

The Member of Parliament (MP) for East Thanet is Polly Billington of the Labour Party. She has been the constituency's MP since the 2024 general election.

Broadstairs and St Peter's have been twinned with Wattignies in northern France since the early 1980s.

== Geography ==
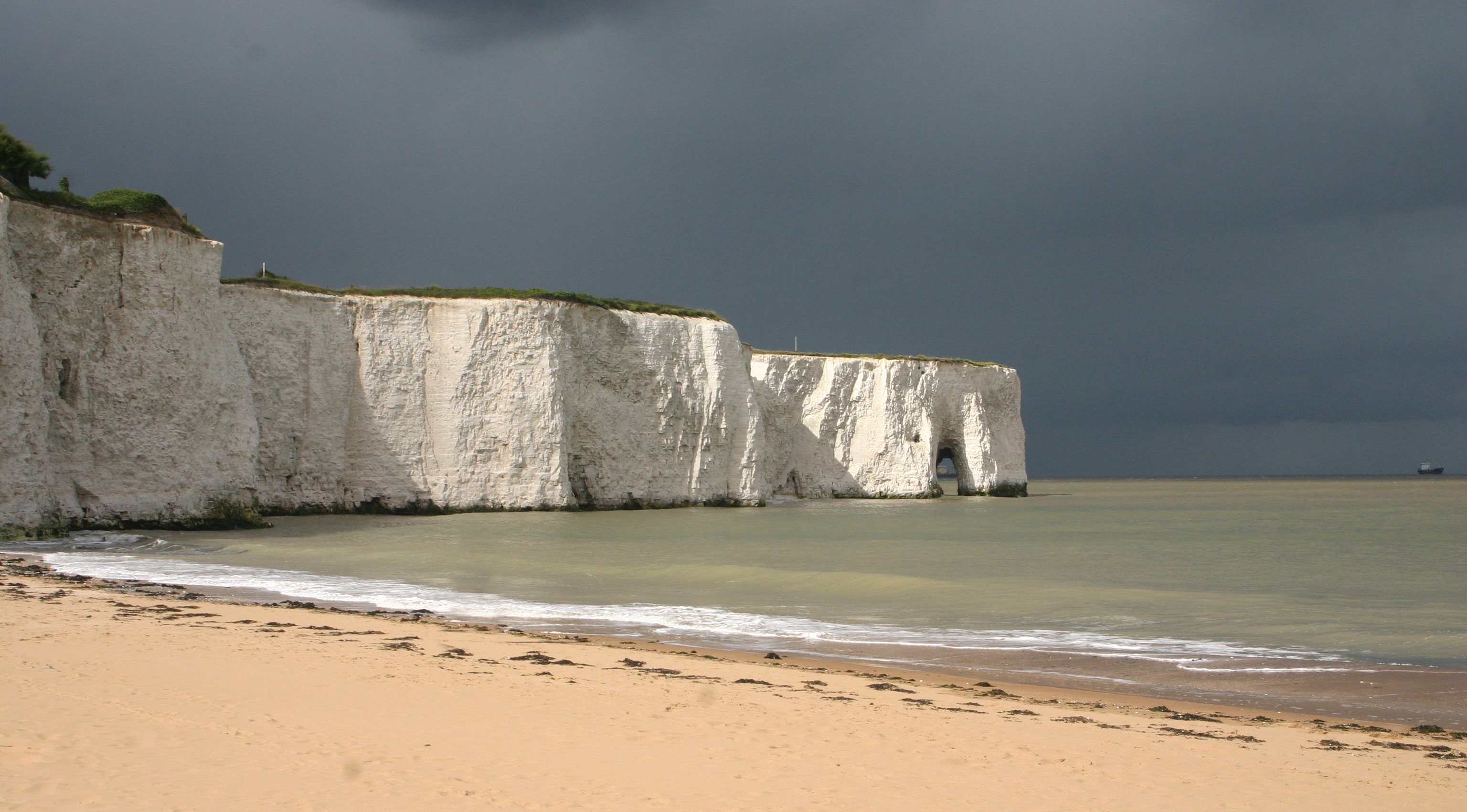
White cliffs at Kingsgate beach

The town lies above a harbour with cliffs on either side. It has seven bays of golden sand, which are (from south to north) Dumpton Gap, Louisa Bay, Viking Bay, Stone Bay, Joss Bay, Kingsgate Bay and Botany Bay. North Foreland rises between Stone Bay and Joss Bay. Inland from Joss Bay and the North Foreland was the 59 acres of Caleys Grange that prior to the reformation was part of the estate of the Abbott of St. Augustine, and later known as Callis Court, now demolished. At one time much of the land of St Peter's and Broadstairs was a tithe of Callis Court, being 1154 ¼ acres of the total 2594 ½ acres of the entire St Peter's Parish. On the cliffs above Kingsgate Bay is Kingsgate Castle, formerly part of the estate of Lord Holland but now converted into private residences.

Broadstairs has a very mild maritime climate.

== Demography ==
Broadstairs and St Peter's
2001 UK census	Broadstairs and St Peter's	Thanet; District	England
Total population	24,370	126,702	49,138,831
Foreign born	5.3%	5.1%	9.2%
White	98%	98%	91%
Asian	1.0%	0.6%	4.6%
Black	0.2%	0.3%	2.3%
Christian	75%	74%	72%
Muslim	0.4%	0.5%	3.1%
Hindu	0.3%	0.2%	1.1%
No religion	14%	16%	15%
65+ years old	24%	22%	16%
Unemployed	2.9%	4.4%	3.3%

At the 2001 UK census, the parish of Broadstairs and St Peter's had 24,370 residents in 10,597 households. Of those households, 34.2% were married couples, 6.7% were cohabiting couples and 8.3% were lone parents. 31.8% of all households were made up of individuals, and 20.9% had someone living alone at pensionable age. 25.7% of households included children aged under 16, or a person aged 16 to 18 who was in full-time education.

The parish has a low proportion of non-white people compared with national figures; the ethnicity recorded in the 2001 census was 97.9% white, 0.7% mixed race, 0.3% Chinese, 0.7% other Asian, 0.2% black and 0.2% other. The number of foreign-born residents is relatively low; the place of birth of residents in 2001 was 94.7% United Kingdom, 0.7% Republic of Ireland, 0.5% Germany, 0.9% other Western Europe countries, 0.3% Eastern Europe, 0.8% Africa, 0.6% South Asia, 0.5% Far East, 0.3% North America, 0.2% Middle East, 0.2% Oceania and 0.1% South America. Religion was recorded as 75.3% Christian, 0.4% Muslim, 0.3% Hindu, 0.3% Buddhist and 0.3% Jewish. 14.3% were recorded as having no religion, 0.5% had an alternative religion and 8.6% did not state their religion.

The age distribution was 5% aged 0–4 years, 14% aged 5–15 years, 5% aged 16–19 years, 26% aged 20–44 years, 27% aged 45–64 years and 24% aged 65 years and over. There was a high percentage of residents over 65, compared with the national average of 16%, mainly due to seaside towns being popular retirement destinations. For every 100 females, there were 87.1 males.

=== Employment ===
At the 2001 census, the economic activity of residents aged 16–74 was 34.1% in full-time employment, 12.8% in part-time employment, 10.0% self-employed, 2.9% unemployed, 2.3% students with jobs, 4.1% students without jobs, 20.0% retired, 6.5% looking after home or family, 4.9% permanently sick or disabled and 2.4% economically inactive for other reasons. The percentage of retired people was significantly higher than the national figure of 14%. The percentage of unemployed people was low compared with the national rate of 3.4% and the district rate of 4.4%. Only 12% of residents aged 16–74 had a higher education qualification or the equivalent, compared with 20% nationwide. The Office for National Statistics estimated that during the period of April 2001 to March 2002, the average gross weekly income of households was £522 (£27,219 per year).

The industry of employment of residents, at the 2001 census, was 15% retail, 14% health and social work, 13% manufacturing, 13% education, 10% real estate, 8% construction, 7% transport and communications, 6% public administration, 5% hotels and restaurants, 3% finance, 1% agriculture and 5% other community, social or personal services. Compared with national figures, there was a relatively high number of workers in the education and health/social care industries and a relatively low number in finance and real estate. Many residents commute to work outside the town; at the 2001 census, the town had 9,842 employed residents, but there were only 9,049 jobs within the town.

== Economy ==
As a seaside resort, the economy is mainly based around tourism; there are hotels and guest houses on and near the seafront to accommodate the influx of all-year-round visitors. Although the number of hotels in recent years has declined because of the high land redevelopment values, this has resulted in an improvement in quality of the existing premises. The High Street has a wide variety of independent shops and services and there are several factories, mainly situated on the small industrial estates on the town's borders. The above-average population age has led to many health- and social-care jobs at local care homes. At the 2001 UK census, 1.8% of the population resided in a medical or care establishment, which is more than double the national average of only 0.8%. Many jobs in education are provided by the town's relatively high number of schools and colleges.

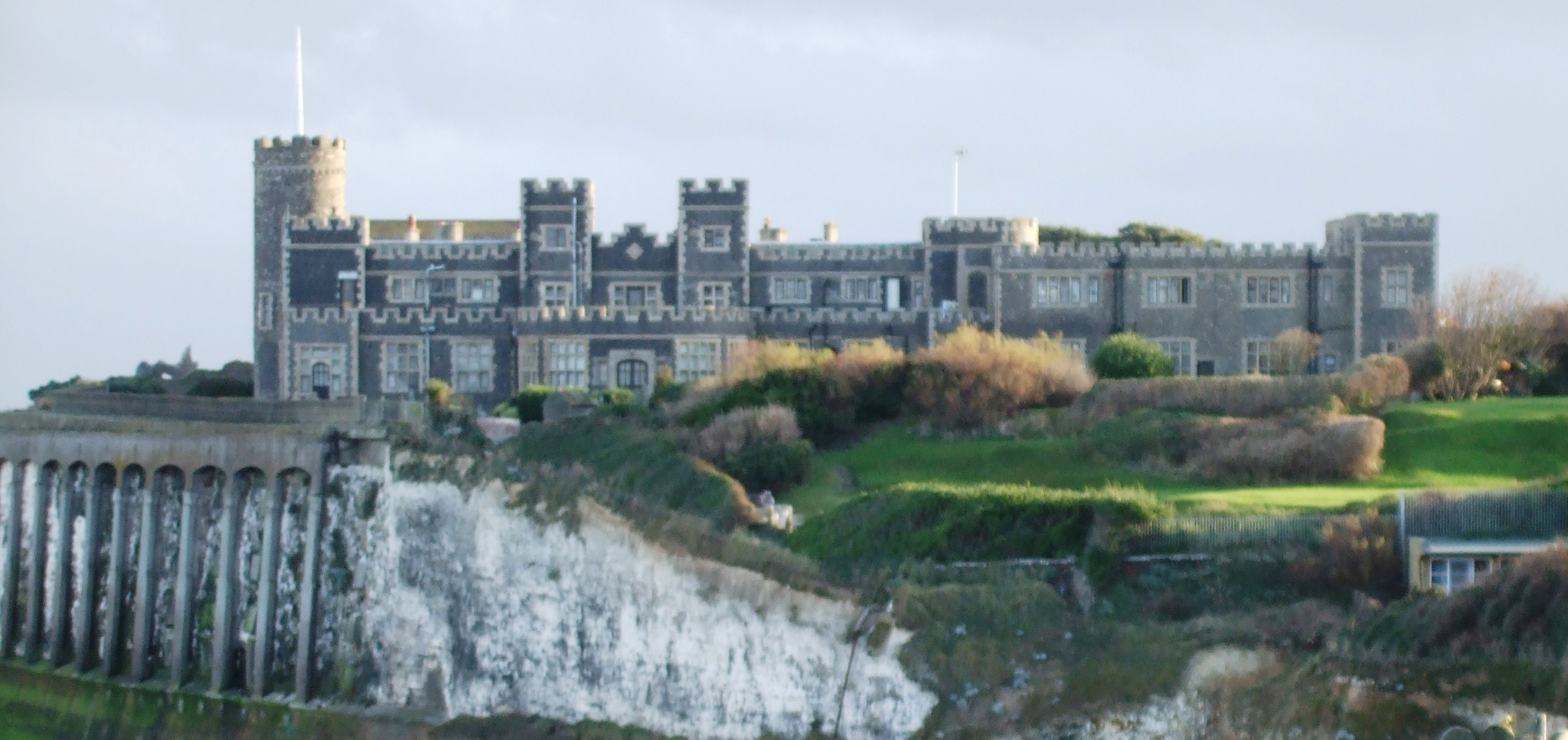
Kingsgate Castle has been converted into flats.

- Broadstairs' & St Peter's Chamber of Commerce has existed for over 100 years and has been instrumental in establishing links between traders and authority and raising money for projects including the town's CCTV scheme.
- Broadstairs has seen major development in its area recently with a large out-of-town shopping development at Westwood called Westwood Cross. This has attracted national retailers, a new Travelodge hotel a bingo club, a casino, a vue cinema, a new fitness centre, and an Ask, Nando's, Frankie & Benny's restaurants.
- Within the Broadstairs boundary there are three large supermarkets: Asda, Sainsbury's and a Tesco Extra, which, before redevelopment, was the home of a large Co-op store (one of the first hypermarkets built in the UK). Tesco has a metro store in the town. Tesco also has a convenience store (Tesco Express) in the town and there is a small Co-op in St Peter's village.
- Motor and household insurance claims of Saga Insurance Ltd. are managed in Broadstairs (as an extension of their main offices in Folkestone).

== Culture and community ==
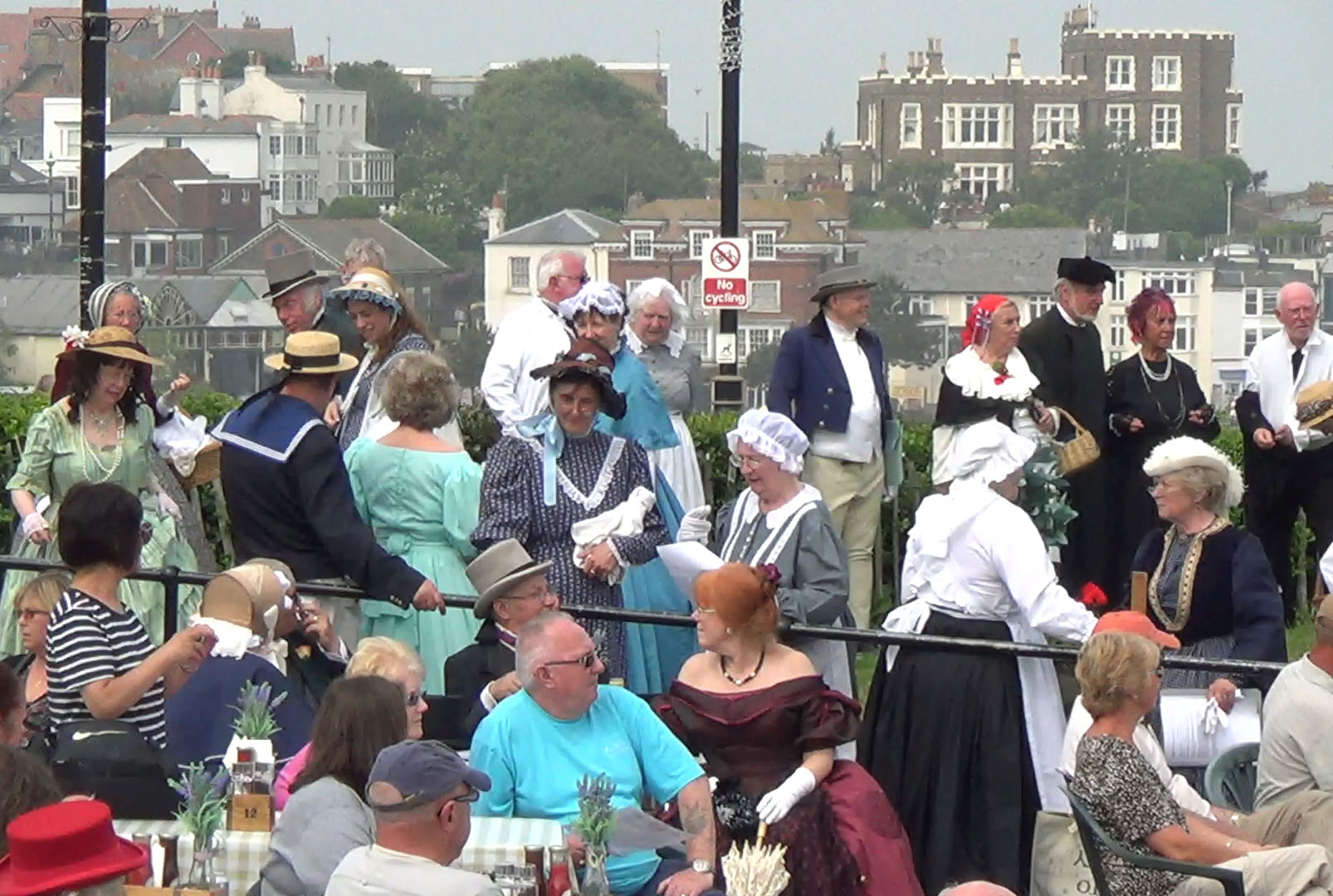
A photograph of the Broadstairs Dickens Festival 2013 with Bleak House in the background

There is a small cinema, "The Palace Cinema" (sometime known as The Windsor or as Cinema by the Sands), in Harbour Street. It was originally built as a museum related to York Gate in 1911.

- The Broadstairs Dickens Festival is held annually in honour of the novelist Charles Dickens around the second or third week of June. The festival includes a production of one of Dickens' novels, with people about the town wearing Victorian dress. The festival first took place in 1937, when Captain Miles Conway Robson conceived the idea of commemorating the centenary of the publication of The Pickwick Papers by creating a festival to draw people to the town including a grand ball and a production of The Pickwick Papers, a novel partly written in the town.

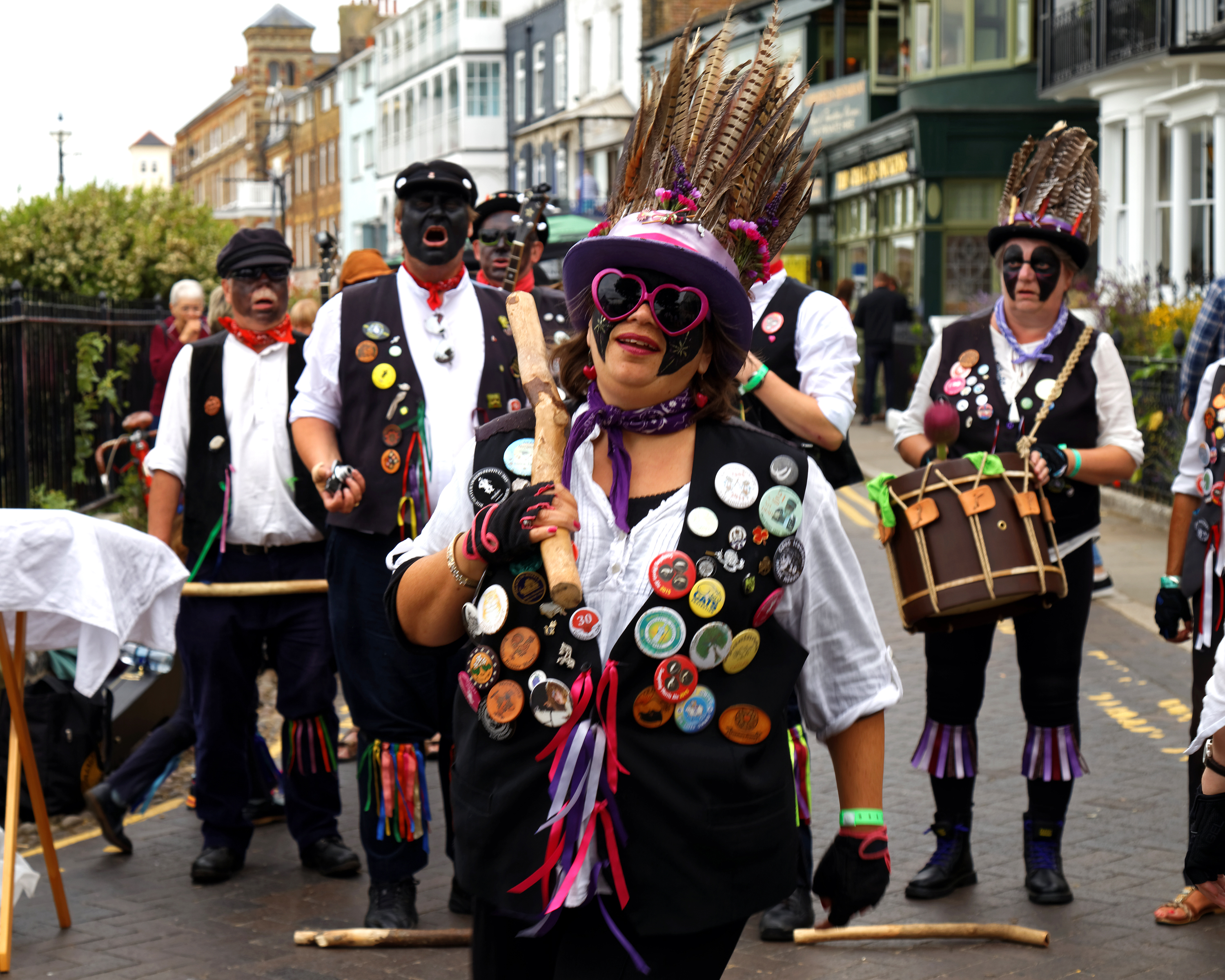
Morris dancers at Broadstairs Folk Week

- In the second week of August each year, the town holds Broadstairs Folk Week music festival. The main acts perform at the Concert Marquee in the town's main park (Pierremont Park), with smaller musical events held in public houses, restaurants, cafés, and at the town's bandstand. Itinerant musicians and Morris dancers perform along the bay promenade. A school and playing field becomes an organization centre and campsite for entertainers. The town's population significantly increases with tourists, day-trippers and holiday makers.
- During the summer season, and on 5 November, there are firework displays every Wednesday evening on Viking Bay.
- In August the town holds an annual Water Gala. In the past this has included a visit by the Red Arrows, a hovercraft and lifeboats. Beach-based competitions and shows continue through the day. A funfair is on the cliff-top gardens, and a small air display takes place.
- In the village of St Peter's, tours are held throughout the summer.

More recently, a new event has been added to the mix – the Big Broadstairs Weekend. Starting the season in May, the event is themed, comprises a dance at the Pavilion on the Friday night, Film on the Beach on the Saturday night and a Guinness World Record Attempt on the Sunday. Broadstairs currently holds the record for biggest remote dance class.

== Landmarks ==
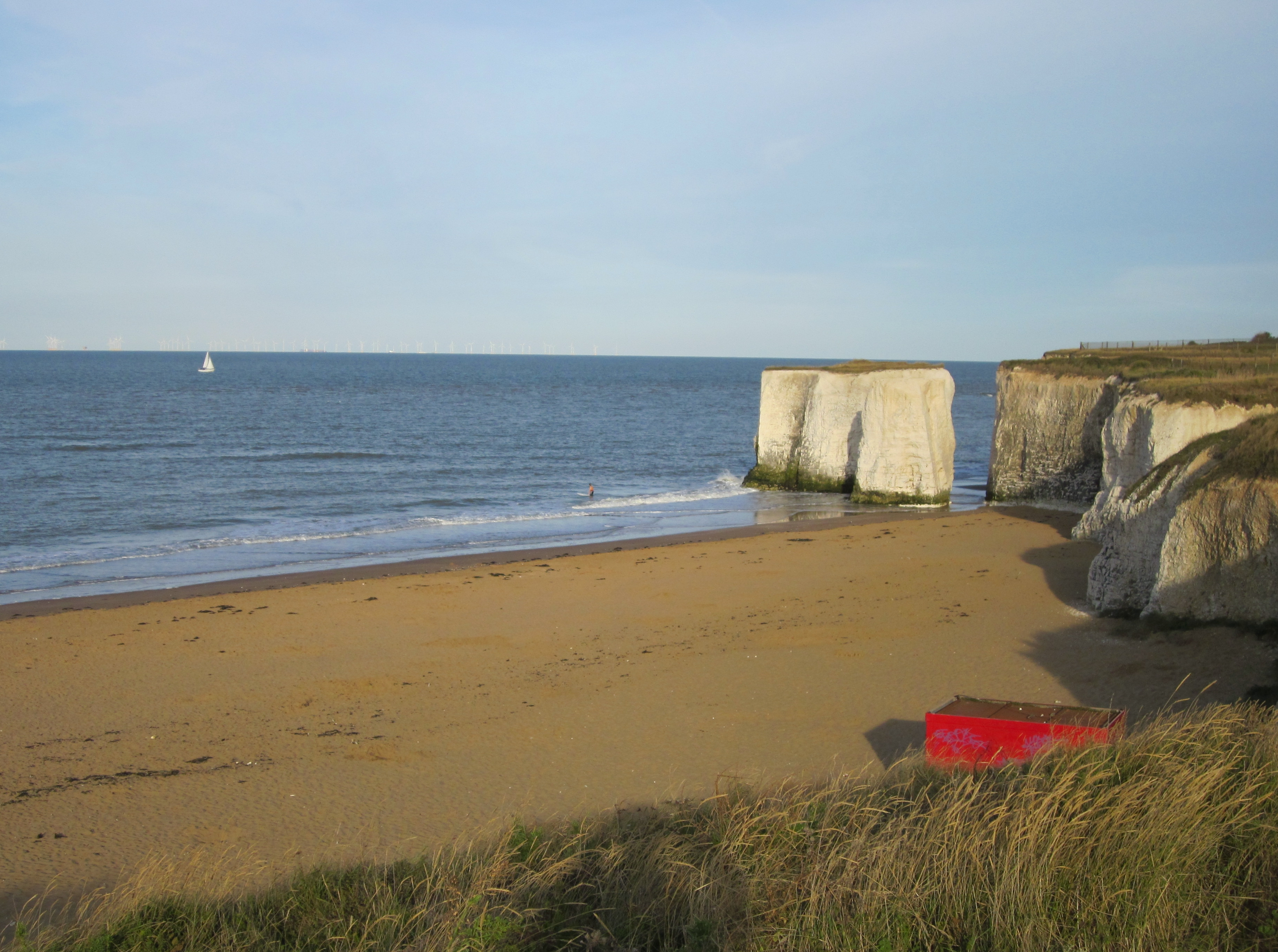
Botany Bay.

The beaches at Botany Bay and Joss Bay had excellent bathing water quality in 2026. Viking Bay beach, the main beach in Broadstairs, had a good water bathing classification in 2026. In summer, this bay is often very busy with tourists enjoying cafes and ice-cream outlets. On Harbour Street, the 1933 built Pavilion on the Sands has extensive views across the bay, and hosts general entertainment, as well as being a wedding venue.

The Dickens House Museum on the seafront, displays many artefacts relating to Charles Dickens and his life in Broadstairs. Crampton Tower by the railway station houses a museum containing Thomas Russell Crampton's working drawings, models, graphics, patents, awards and artefacts connected to his life and works. Other galleries illustrate the history and development of the railways, the electric tramways, road transport and other aspects of local industry. The original Broadstairs stagecoach, built in 1860, is displayed alongside seven working model railways in gauges N, OO, O and Gauge One.

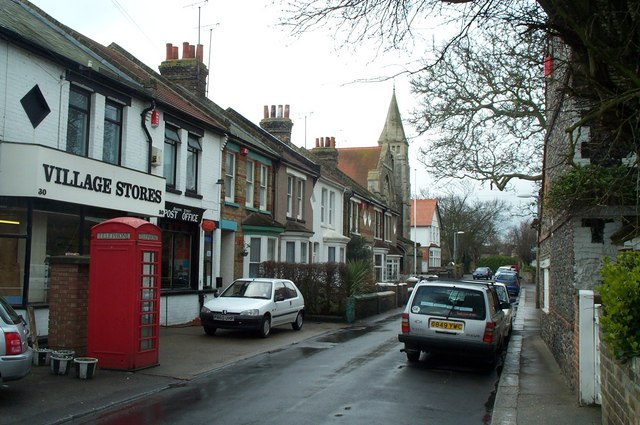
Reading Street leading to St Peter's church

== Transport ==
The town is situated 20 miles (32 km) from both Dover and Canterbury, and about 67 miles (108 km) from the M25, London's orbital motorway.

The railway first reached Broadstairs in 1862. In 1851, the region's rail network had been supplemented by the London to south coast route, including the coastal link from Chichester to Ramsgate, the cross-country service between London and Dover and the Mid-Kent line that linked Redhill, Tonbridge and Ashford to London's first Eurostar terminal at Waterloo (opened in 1848). The present rail route loop to London was only completed in 1926 with the opening of a new connecting line between Broadstairs and Ramsgate. Broadstairs station (unlike neighbouring Margate) is a 10-minute walk from the beach, and as of an 1872 map had open fields on each side. The present railway overbridge was rebuilt in 1901 to account for the new tram service down the high street. Although rebuilt in the 1926 with a ornamental belfry, electricity was not installed at the station until well into the 1970s, and the buildings and platforms remained illuminated by gaslight until then.

Between 1901 and 1937 Broadstairs was served by trams on a line that extended from Westbrook to Ramsgate and had its electric generating station near St Peter's.

Since 2009 Southeastern have been operating a high speed train service between London St Pancras and Ashford International which then runs on to Broadstairs at conventional speed cutting about 40 minutes from what was once a two-hour journey to other termini in London. It is unusual in that trains to London can run either way through the station.

== Education ==
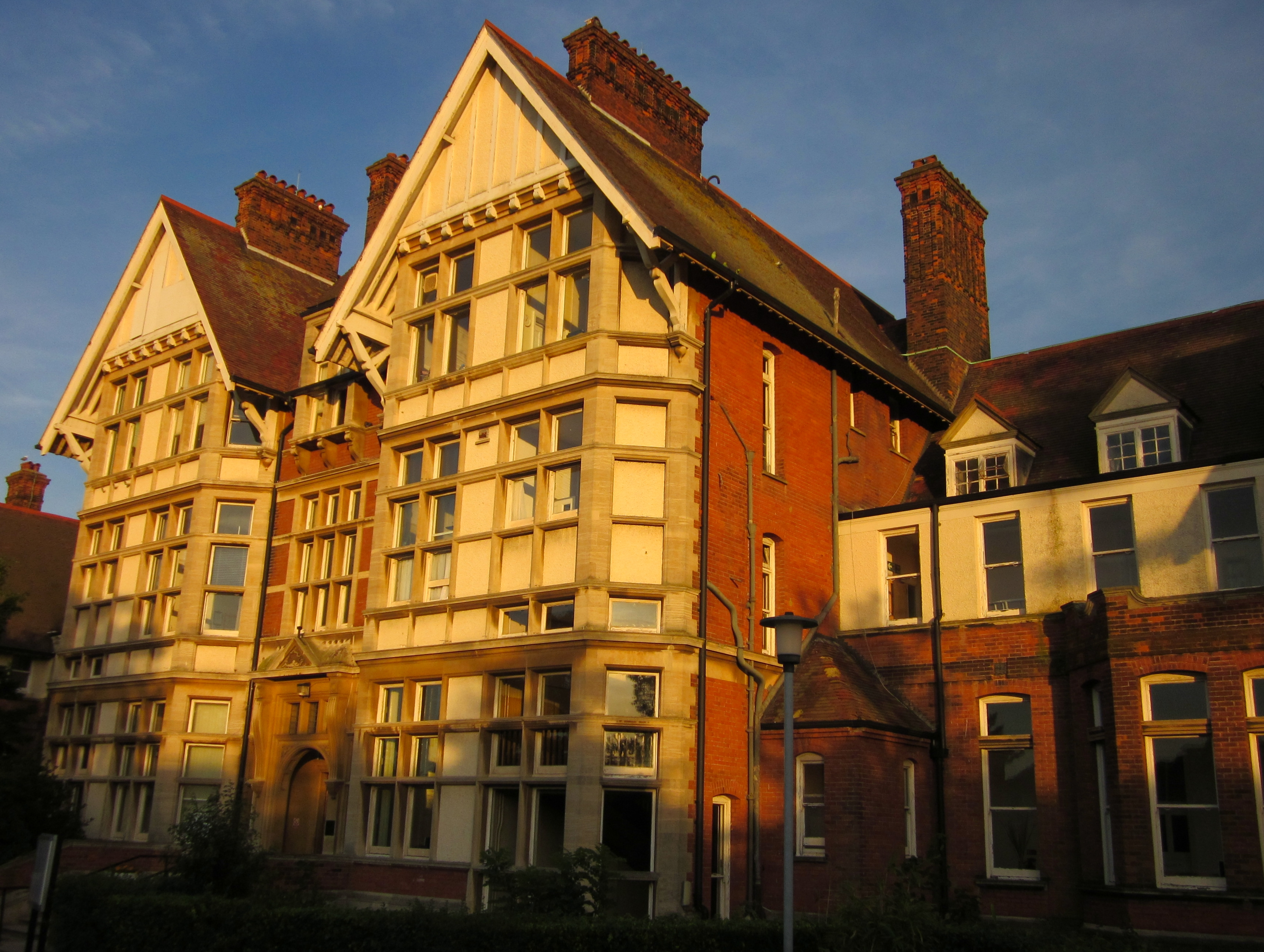
East Kent College in Broadstairs

=== State schools ===
Infant and Primary

- St Mildred's Infant School
- Upton Junior School
- St Peter in Thanet CE Junior School
- St Joseph's RC Primary School
- Bromstone County Primary School

Secondary Modern and Grammar

- Dane Court Grammar School
- St Georges C of E Foundation School
- The Charles Dickens School

=== Special schools ===
- Bradstow School
- Stone Bay School

=== Independent schools ===
Junior and Preparatory

- Wellesley Haddon Dene School (merger of Haddon Dene School and Wellesley House School in 2022)

=== Colleges and universities ===
- East Kent College
- Canterbury Christ Church University (the Broadstairs campus was sold on and disbanded in 2018)

== Religious sites ==
The original Shrine of Our Ladye Star of the Sea is believed to date back to at least the 11th century. The chapel on what is now Albion St was destroyed by a storm in the 16th century but was restored in 1601. It gives its name to the Roman Catholic Church of Our Lady Star of the Sea in Broadstairs. The Anglican parish church is Holy Trinity, dating from 1830, and which was described by Dickens as "a hideous temple of flint, like a petrified haystack".

== Sport ==
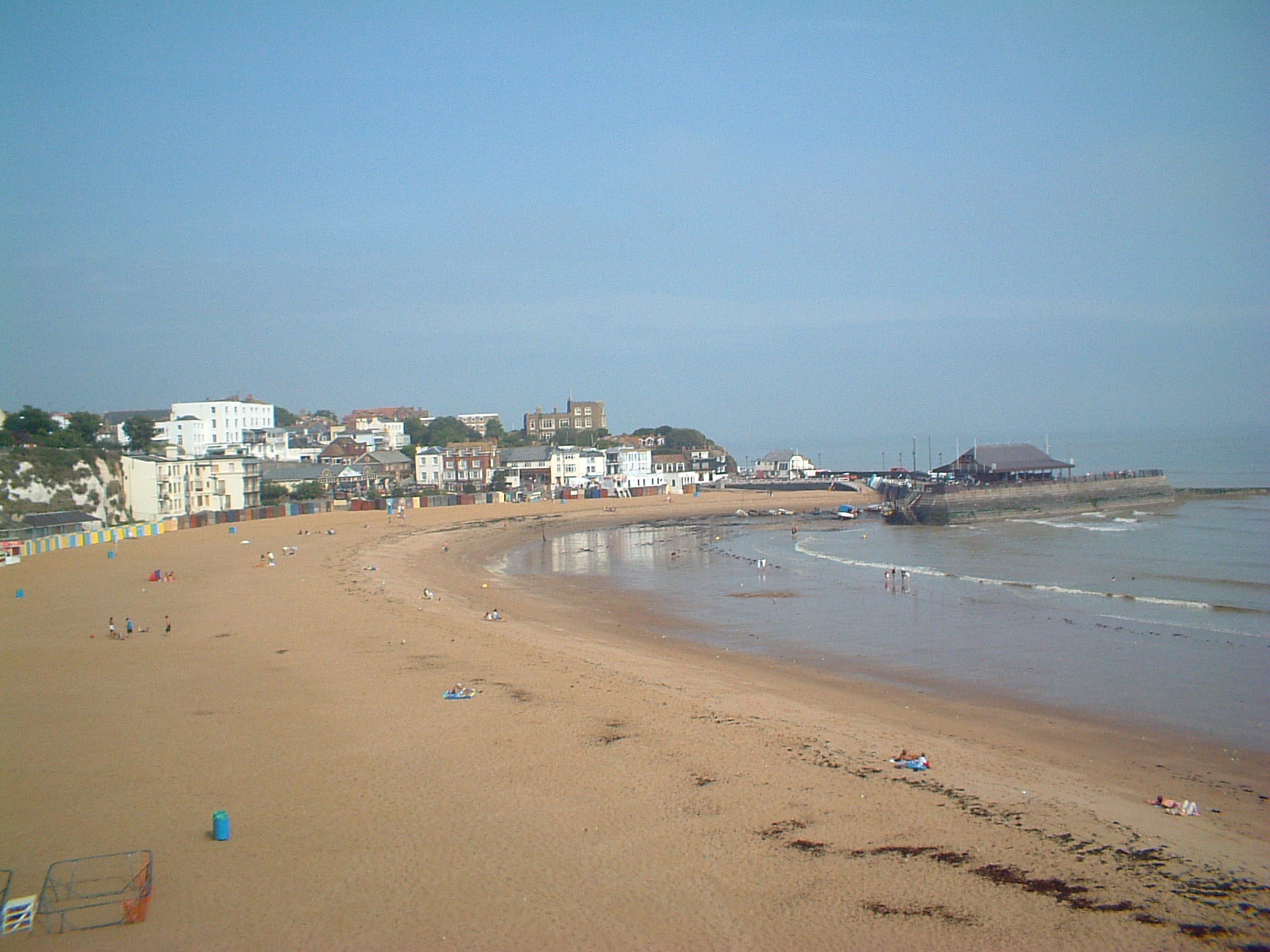
Viking Bay

- Thanet Wanderers Rugby Union Football Club is based in Broadstairs at St. Peter's Recreation Ground.
- Sandcastle building competition takes place annually.
- Broadstairs has a Green bowling club.
- Broadstairs & St Peter's Lawn Tennis Club
- Beach Volleyball is held on the beach in the summer.
- Broadstairs is home to the North Foreland Golf Club.
- Broadstairs Sailing Club in Harbour Street once had former prime minister Edward Heath as a member.
- Broadstairs squash club.

=== Sea swimming ===
Sea swimming is popular, especially on the beach at Viking Bay, which is patrolled by lifeguards during the summer. Dickens swam here and British comedian Frank Muir grew up as a 'Beach Boy' in the town, describing his experience in the sea and on 'the sands' in a chapter of his autobiography.

There are public toilets at the beach level in Viking Bay, but no changing facilities and one very basic freshwater shower (summer only). There is a freshwater tap at the bottom of the steps at the north end of the bay.

The bay is marked by striped posts on rocks at either end. The bay is alternately full of water at high tide or completely dry at low tide. At high tide, the beach shelf drops off quickly and a swimmer can be out of their depth within a few feet of the shore. At middle and low tides, the shelf is much more gently sloping and it is possible to play in the surf, and even swim, in water that is only waist high. At high tide and middle tide, swimmers that stay within the bay (within the posts) are completely sheltered from the tidal stream of the English Channel. At any tide, swimmers venturing out beyond the striped posts may encounter a strong tidal current running parallel to the coast, flowing either from south to north or north to south, depending on whether the tide is coming up the English Channel or draining out through it. Even strong experienced swimmers will find it difficult to make progress against this tidal stream at its greatest flow, and swimmers in difficulty should swim directly towards the nearest part of the shore, rather than try to return to the point where they originally entered.

Stone Bay to the north of Viking Bay also has a lifeguard in summer and attracts swimmers at all times of the year.

== Media ==
Broadstairs has only one paid-for newspaper, the Isle of Thanet Gazette. Its sister publication, the Thanet Times, closed in October 2012 after 116 years; both were owned by Northcliffe Media. Free newspapers for the town include the Thanet Extra, part of the KM Group; and yourthanet, part of KOS Media. Isle magazine is published quarterly and includes listings of events as well as accommodation and tourist information.The Broadstairs Beacon magazine has been published three times a year since 2019 and is available online or in printed form for free at several places in the town.

Local radio stations are KMFM Thanet, owned by the KM Group, community radio station Academy FM (Thanet); and the county-wide stations Heart South, Gold and BBC Radio Kent. Thanet Community Radio also offer an online community podcasting service for Ramsgate, Broadstairs, Margate and the wider areas of Thanet. National broadcasting channels include BBC South East and ITV Meridian (East)

== Notable people ==
People from Broadstairs are called Bradstonians.

- William Bridges Adams, locomotive engineer and inventor of the Adams Axle, died at Broadstairs in 1872 and was buried at St Peter's Church.
- Sir Richard Rodney Bennett, composer and pianist, was born in Broadstairs in 1936.
- John Buchan apparently based the title of his novel, The Thirty Nine Steps after the set of steps on the beach at a house called St Cuby, Cliff Promenade at North Foreland, Broadstairs, where he was recuperating from illness in 1915.
- Thomas Russell Crampton, railway engineer, was born in Broadstairs in 1816.
- Charles Dickens visited Broadstairs regularly from 1837 until 1859 and described the town as "Our English Watering Place". He wrote David Copperfield while staying at Bleak House.
- Sir Edward Heath, Prime Minister of the United Kingdom from 1970 to 1974, was born in Broadstairs in 1916 and lived there until going to study at Balliol College, Oxford in 1935.
- Edward Higgins (E. O. Higgins), fiction writer, podcaster and performer lived in Broadstairs for two years from 2009, whose novel Conversations with Spirits is based in the town
- Oliver Postgate, writer of the Clangers animated TV series, was a longtime resident of Broadstairs and his life is commemorated by a mosaic of the Clangers and a blue plaque on the front of his former home in Chandos Square.
- Writer and filmmaker Bruce Robinson set his first full-length novel The Peculiar Memories of Thomas Penman in Broadstairs and included characters from his childhood in Broadstairs.
- Jennifer Vyvyan, operatic soprano, was born in Broadstairs in 1925.

== See also ==
- Bleak House – the Dickens novel is set in St Albans.
- Thanet power station
