= Isle of Thanet Electric Tramways and Lighting Company =

Tramway operator in Kent, England

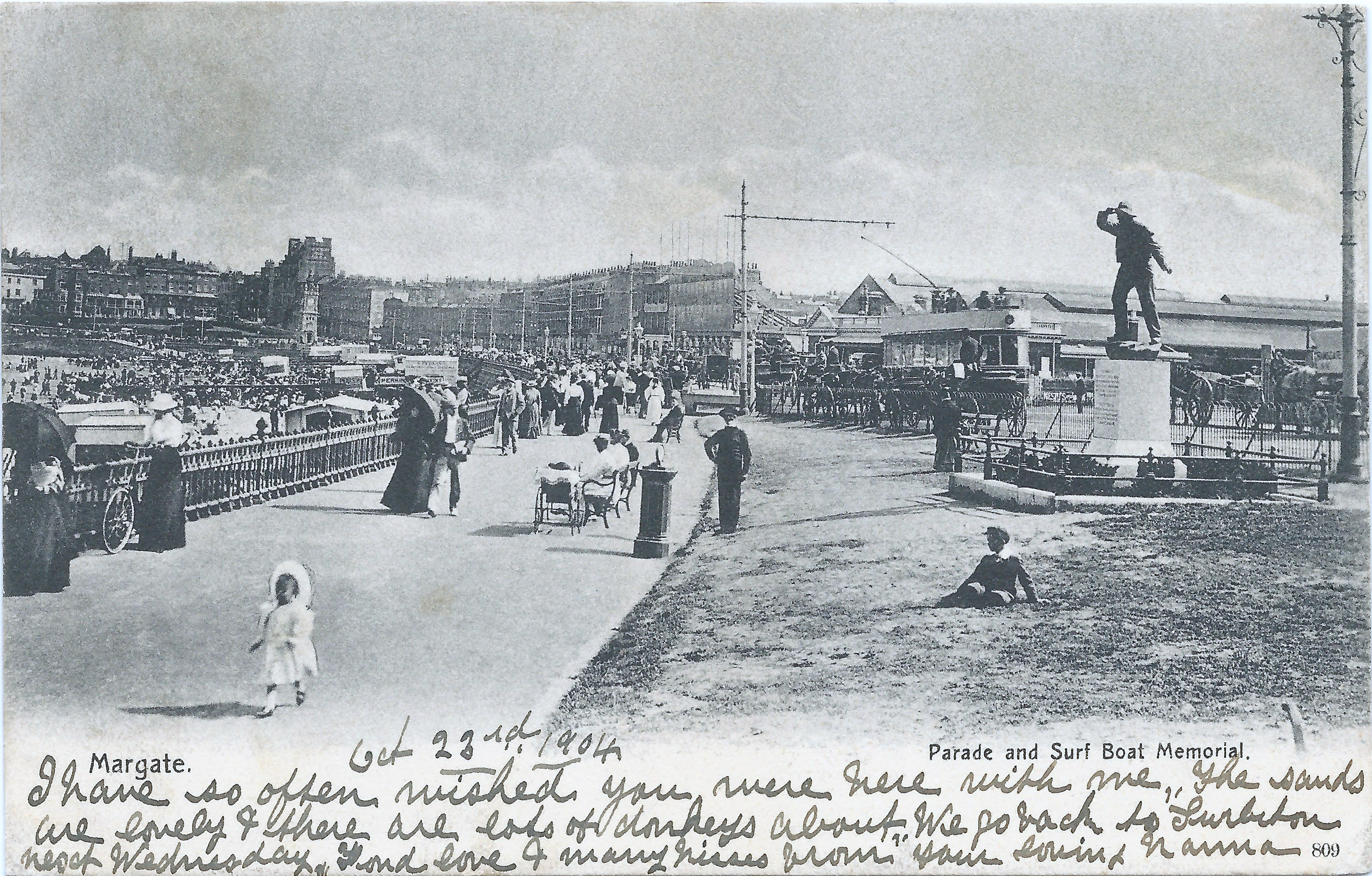
- Margate parade in 1904

Operation
- Locale: Margate, Ramsgate
- Open: 4 April 1901
- Close: 27 March 1937
- Status: Closed

Infrastructure
- Track gauge: 3 ft 6 in (1,067 mm)
- Propulsion system: Electric

Statistics
- Route length: 10.84 miles (17.45 km)

The Isle of Thanet Electric Tramways and Lighting Company operated a tramway service between Margate and Ramsgate between 1901 and 1937.

== History ==
Services started on 4 April 1901 on a route which ran from Canterbury Road, Margate, via Cliftonville, High Street Broadstairs, Dumpton Park Drive, to a terminus at Ramsgate Town railway station.

The main depot for the tramway was located at TR 3806 6900 (at the foot of Northdown Hill where it has a junction with Westover Road, Northdown Road and what is now Dane Valley Road).

Electric power was supplied by Thanet power station adjacent to the tram depot.

A smaller depot was located at TR 3382 7006 at the terminus in Westbrook.

== Fleet ==
The initial livery was maroon and cream.

- 1-40 St. Louis Car Company 1901.
- 41-50 G.F. Milnes & Co. 1901
- 51-60 British Electric Car Company 1903

== Accidents ==
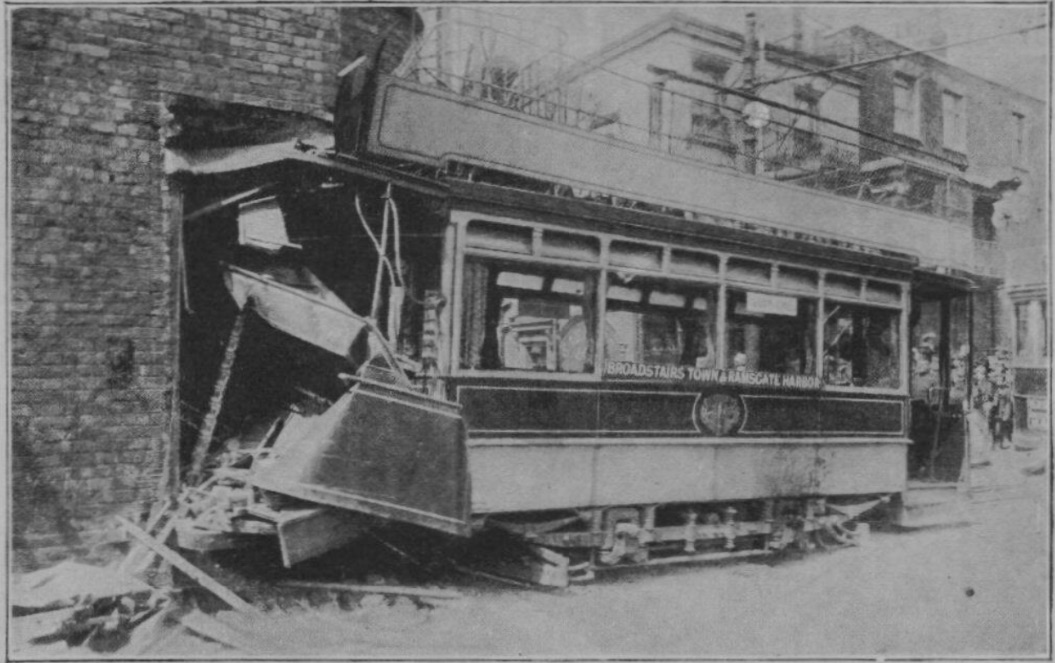
The runaway tramcar from the Illustrated London News 3 June 1905

On 27 May 1905 car 47 failed to take a bend and came off the tracks into a grocer's shop in Bellevue Road, Ramsgate, seriously injuring the driver, conductor and the grocer's 7-year-old daughter.

On 3 August 1905, car 41, during a routine descent of the precipitous, and adverse camber leading down Madeira Walk hill into Ramsgate harbour, suddenly careered out of control, jumping the tracks, causing it to crash straight through the railings, so that it then dropped over the 30 feet (9 m) cliff edge adjacent. Providentially, only a few passengers were travelling on car 41 that day, and they came out of the ordeal unscathed, but the driver, who was new to the job, sustained some injury.

== Closure ==
The tramway service closed on 27 March 1937 but the company continued to supply electrical power to the district for domestic and commercial consumption.
