= Shrine of Our Lady, Bradstowe =

Chapel in Broadstairs, England

Coordinates: 51°21′34.4″N 1°26′35.6″E

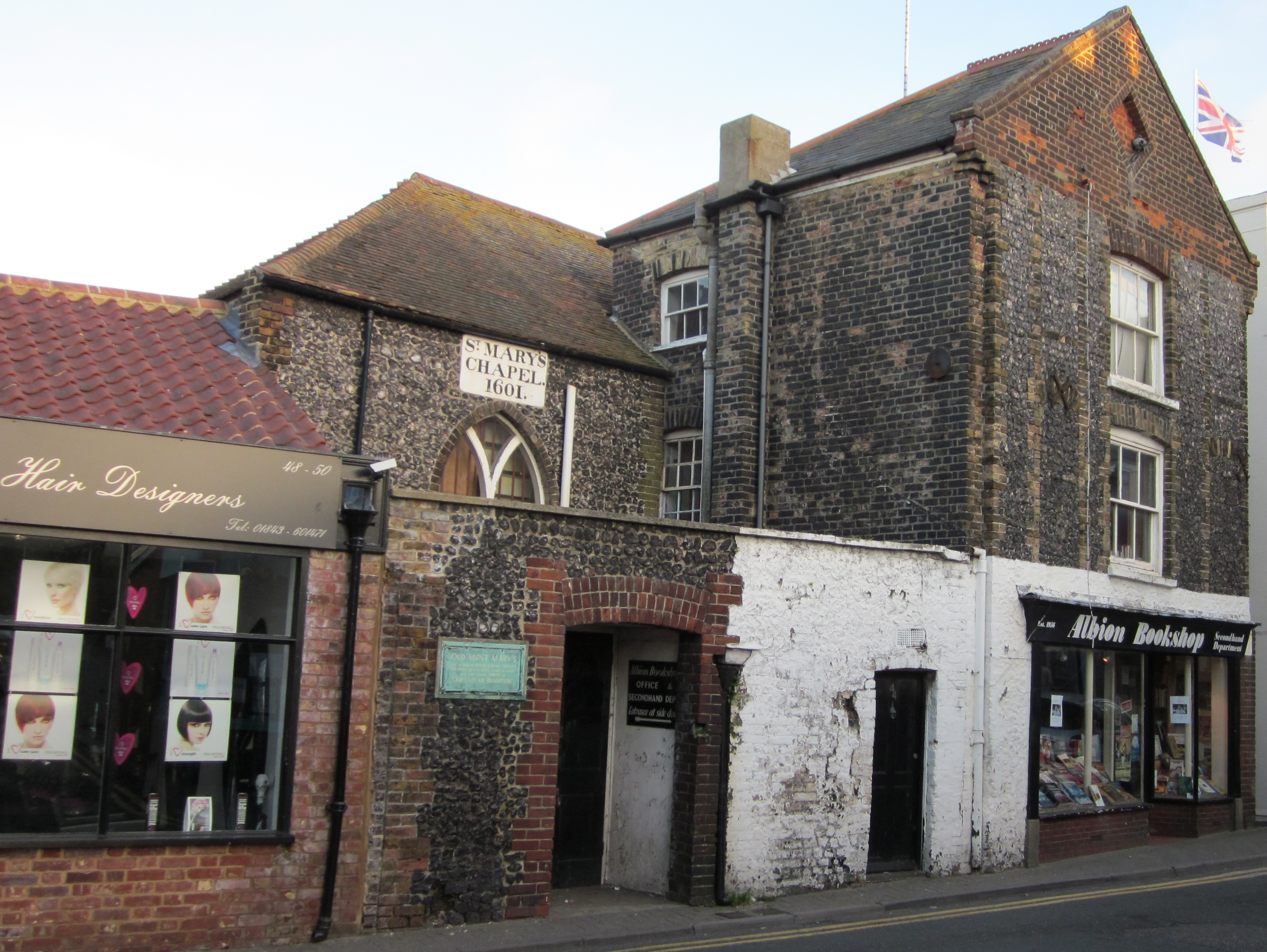
St Mary's chapel was built on the site of the shrine, although 1601 refers to the date it was restored and not the date of the original structure.

The Shrine of Our Ladye Star of the Sea was an old chapel on the cliffs at Broadstairs (which was formerly known as Bradstowe). Dating back at least to the 1350s, the two towers of the chapel were a major landmark for sailors in the area. Given the veneration in which the shrine was held, the custom developed of ships dipping their top-sails to salute the shrine as they sailed past it.

The Chapel of St. Mary's structural remains are, as incorporated in the modern façade, situated on the site of what has been said also to be the oldest surviving building still standing in contemporary Broadstairs, and within its modern content is all that remains of the Medieval Shrine of "Our Lady of Bradstowe". It stands near the harbour on today's Albion Street, at the junction with Alexandra Road.

== History ==
It is said that the Shrine and its Chapel were known to have existed prior to the year 1070, as it was in that year that the old Saxon Church of St. Peter's, then a wooden structure, was rebuilt with stone and flint as the second daughter church of Minster-in-Thanet.

The original building contained the famous shrine of "Our Ladye of Bradstowe", a painted wooden statue of the Virgin Mary. The tradition maintained by the Royal Navy of "showing the flag" at seaside towns to uphold the morale of the Navy is said to have its origins in a service held at the Bradstowe Chapel in 1514 with the crew of the Henry Grace à Dieu in attendance, whilst the largest and latest addition to the King's Fleet was moored nearby. There was also a wooden cross at the top of the cliff. Chapel Stairs in Albion Street marks where steps cut into the chalk used to go down to the harbor.

Up until about 1514, when Trinity House took over such duties, it was traditional for coastal towns and village's to display some kind of beacon on the high points of their coastline as a warning against the locally known potential hazards to shipping. Thus in medieval times the Chapel of St. Mary was known as "The Chapel of Blue Light", for its light was given out into the dark seas through a blue glass lantern.

=== Culmer chapel ===
During the 1520s a severe storm that lasted several days swept into Viking Bay with a storm surge and destroyed the Shrine, badly damaging the Chapel. Shipwright George Culmer rebuilt the Chapel and replaced the Shrine.

In 1601 the owner of the Chapel and the estate upon which it stood was Sir John Culmer, one of the first Congregationalist pioneers. It was he who had ordered the Chapel (and its Shrine) restored. Restoration in those dark times paid little heed to the integrity of the existing structure, consequently, and although much of the original material was reused in the restoration, the new Chapel was said not to be so picturesque as the original. Some of the original ancient wall, a doorway and window have survived in the renovated structure. The Shrine of the Culmer Chapel, a statue derived from the figure of the Virgin Mary, mounted on a tall column, was so positioned that it faced seaward.

The first Pastor in 1601 was Joel Culmer. It had been for some years even then the tradition of ships passing at Thanet to lower their top sail in salutation to the Shrine and Chapel, which was thought to bring a good fate to the passage of the ship.

The Shrine was at some stage, probably 1601, placed inside the Chapel, for thereafter local seamen came to refer to it as "The Weeping Virgin". Hot weather is said to have caused humidity and thus condensation in the Chapel which settled on the face of the Shrine, and caused the figure to appear in the countenance of the Virgin, weeping. This effect was considered by religious mariners to be a bad omen as a storm would often follow, atmospheric changes indicated in the Chapel were thus a good rough guide to those who would face the perils of the sea.

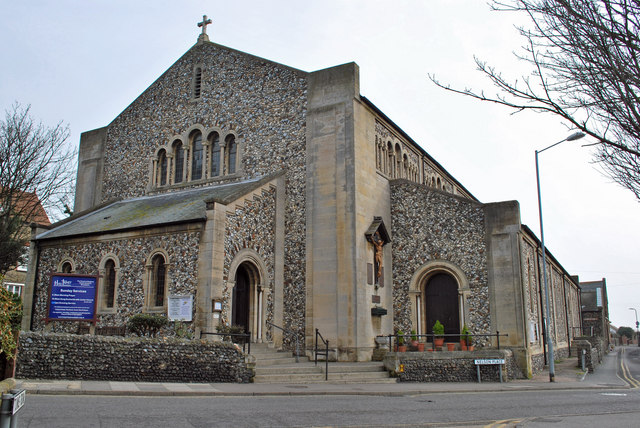
Holy Trinity Church. Broadstairs

The Chapel was again rebuilt in 1825. In the 1830s it hosted a Baptist congregation. In 1871 the Congregationalists built a new place of worship and the front part of the old chapel housed a blacksmith and a greengrocer. In 1924 the Plymouth Brethren had use of the building. In 1926 it became a parish room for the Anglican Holy Trinity Church. The building has since been used as a bookstore and pub.

== Legacy ==
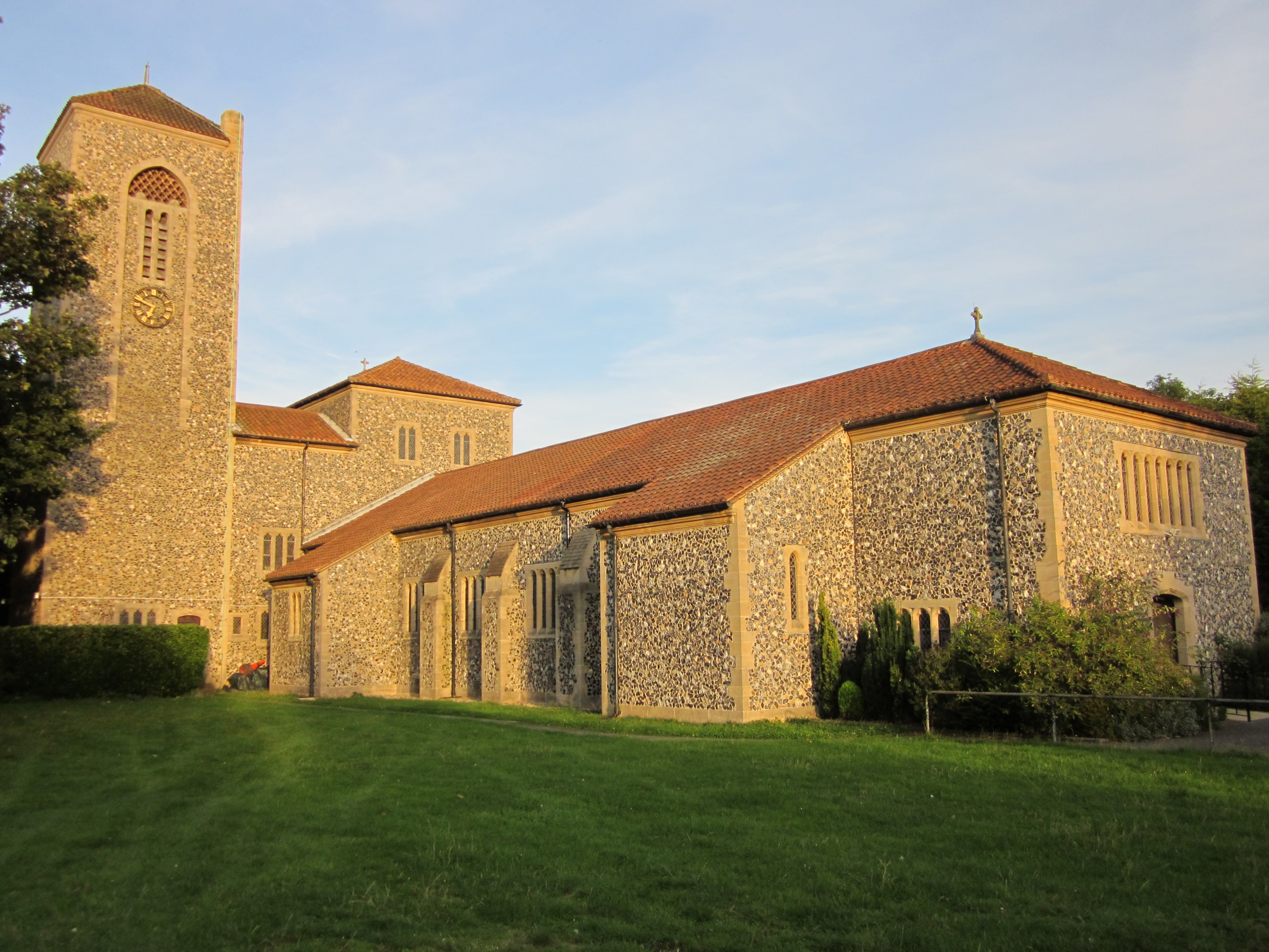
The Catholic Church of Our Lady Star of the Sea is named after the shrine

The shrine of Our Lady of Bradstowe now resides in Holy Trinity church Broadstairs, not far from the original chapel. The shrine gives its name to the Roman Catholic Church of Our Lady Star of the Sea which is inland at 17 Broadstairs Road in St Peter's. This was designed by Giles Gilbert Scott in 1930.
