= Pierremont Hall, Broadstairs, Kent =

Marine villa built in 1785

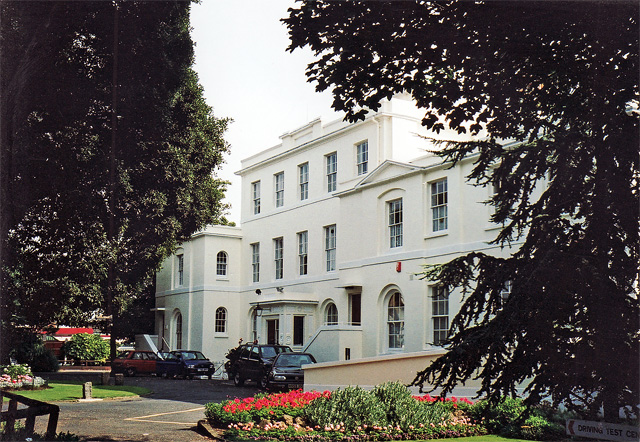
Pierremont Hall

Pierremont Hall in Broadstairs in Kent was built in 1785 as a marine villa for Thomas Forsyth by the famous architect Samuel Pepys Cockerell. It is listed on the English Heritage Register. It was the home of many notable owners until 1927 when it was sold to the Urban District Council. Today it is used as a venue for events including weddings.

== Owners and residents ==
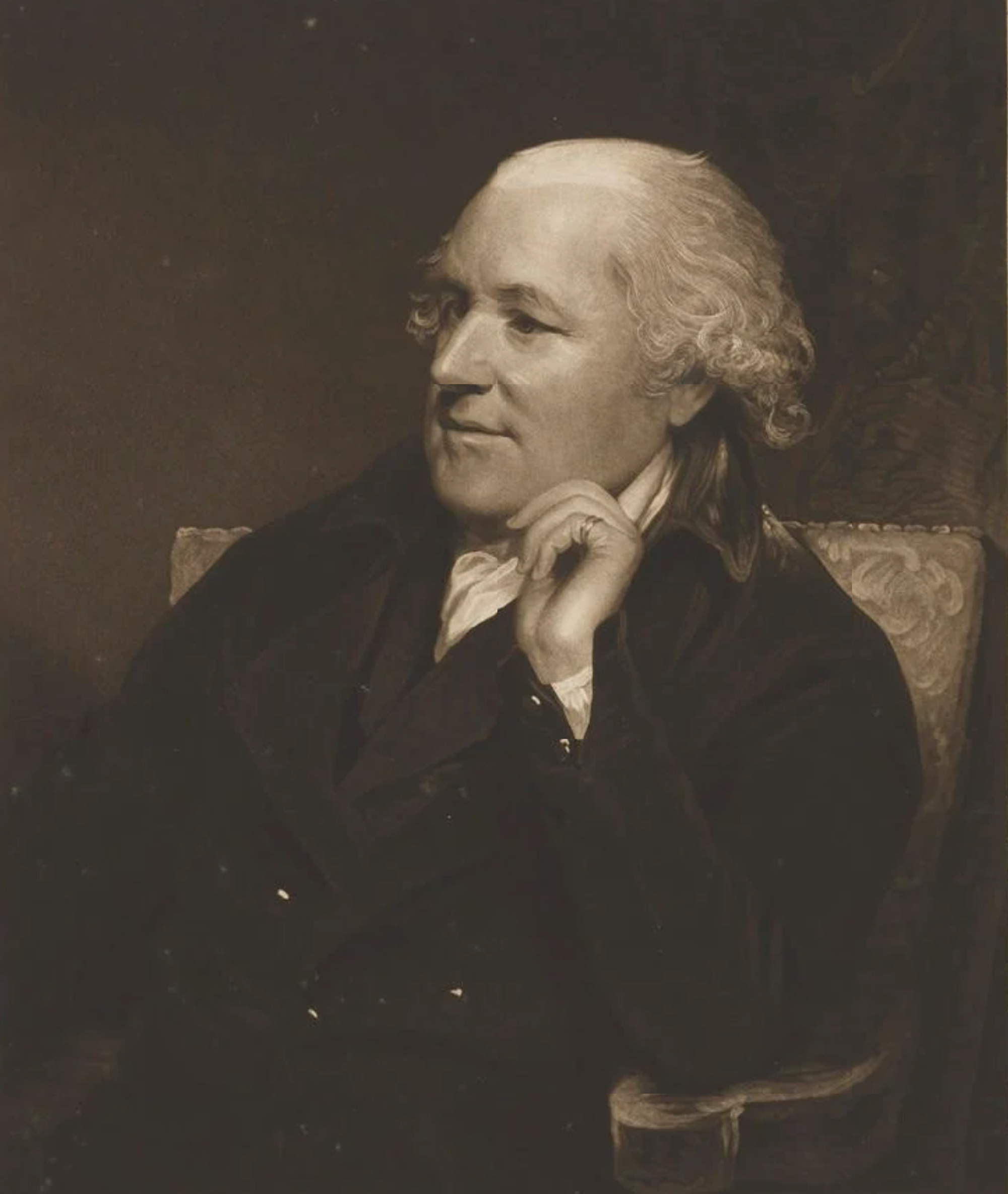
Thomas Forsyth

Thomas Forsyth (1743–1810) was a wealthy property owner. His main residence was in Upper Wimple Street, London and he also had a seat at Empingham Hall. He built Pierremont Hall as a seaside holiday house. He married twice but had no children. His first wife was Elizabeth Neale (1743–1799) who was the daughter and coheiress of Fenn Neale. She died in 1799 and in 1801 he married Jane Martin (1756–1835). Shortly before he died in 1810 he sold the house. The advertisement for this sale is shown. The new owner was Thomas Watkinson Payler.

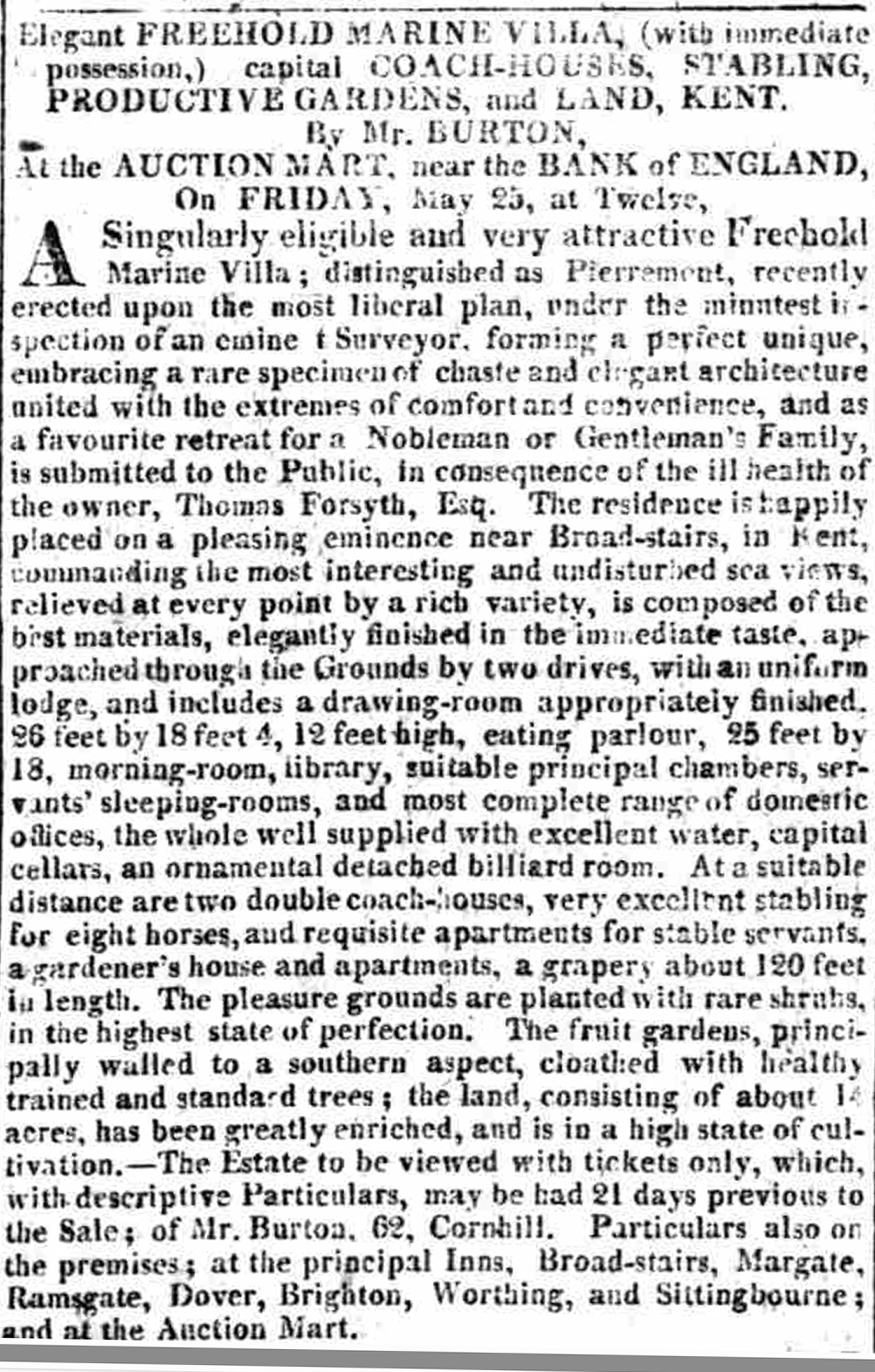
Sale notice for Pierremont Hall in 1810

Thomas Watkinson Payler (1748–1816) came from Hedon and was a property owner, He married three times. His first wife Charlotte Hammond was painted by Joshua Reynolds. He owned Pierremont house for only six years until 1816 when he died. The property was then sold to Edward Fletcher.

Edward Fletcher (1763–1846) made major additions to the house. He was the head of the East India Company in Santipore, Bengal. In 1797 he married Dorethea Blunt (1778–1848) who was the daughter of Sir Charles William Blunt. The couple had three sons and five daughters.

The family's main residence was in Alresford and they often rented Pierrement Hall to the gentry as a holiday house. The Duchess of Kent and a young Princess Victoria holidayed at Pierremont from 1826 to 1836. One visit in 1829 was well documented and Queen Victoria herself noted in her diary her experiences of playing the piano in the music room.

After Edward's death in 1846 the house was put on the market and several years later was bought by Edmund Grimshaw. Edmund Grimshaw (1799–1875) was a barrister who lived in London and used Pierremont Hall as his seaside residence. He did not marry so when he died in 1875 he left his estate to his nephew Reverend Richard Atkinson who changed his name to Grimshaw in accordance with his uncle's will.

Reverend Richard Atkinson Grimshaw (1822–1899) was the Vicar of Cockerham, Lancashire, between 1858 and 1881. In 1846 he married Anna Maria Hughes-Hallet (1823–1904). The couple had four sons and one daughter. In 1894 he put the house on the market and for a short time it was owned by Julian Arnold, a solicitor. At this time it was subdivided for building sites. By 1896 it was the residence of Leonard Walker Posnett (1860 -1936) who used it as a school. In 1917 Pierremont Hall was sold to Dan Mason who turned it into a social club.

Dan Mason (1856–1928) was a partner with his brother Charles in the Cheswick Polish Company which sold boot polish. He lived at “The Maisonette” in High Street during his residence in Broadstairs. He was an extremely wealthy bachelor and made generous gifts to Broadstairs community including the Memorial Recreation Ground. In 1920 he drew up a seven-year lease with the council to rent the Hall for 275 pounds per year with an option to purchase for 5,500 pounds at the end of the lease. In 1927 the Council took this option and bought the Hall which they still own today.
