= E. O. Higgins =

British writer (born 1977)

E O Higgins
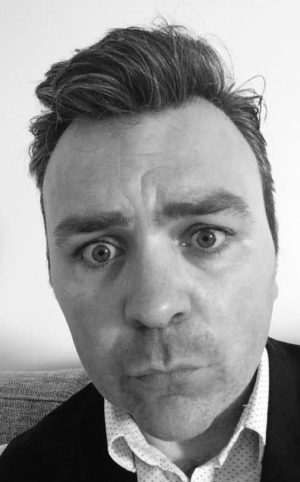
- Higgins in 2015.
- Occupation: Fiction Writer
- Website: eohiggins.co.uk

E O Higgins is a British fiction writer, podcaster, and performer.

== Biography ==
Higgins’ first novel Conversations with Spirits was published in 2015, by Unbound and Penguin.

Conversations with Spirits was shortlisted for Edinburgh International Book Festival’s ‘First Book Award’ the same year.

Whilst attending the Festival, Higgins debated ‘fiction that blurs reality with illusion’ with Canadian novelist Steven Galloway, and performed a ‘séance’ at the Guardian Spiegeltent, in the guise of his comedy alter ego ‘psychic thaumaturge’ Laars Head.

Higgins became a full member of the Crime Writers’ Association in 2015.

As of 2017, Higgins has co-hosted the 'bad culture podcast' Hello Sh!te, with Marc Green.

In August 2018, along with fellow novelists Patrick Kincaid and Paul Holbrook, Higgins founded the online, real-time film group The Film Crowd, to help raise awareness of people suffering from loneliness and social deprivation. The project has since garnered support — and ‘film curation’ — from actor and presenter Sir Tony Robinson, comedian, actor and screenwriter Mark Gatiss, and author Jonathan Coe.

In late 2019, Higgins wrote introductions and annotations on two classic comic novels for D'Ascoyne Press, The Diary of a Nobody by George and Weedon Grossmith and Israel Rank: The Autobiography of a Criminal by Roy Horniman. In July 2020, Higgins appeared on the Backlisted literary podcast, to talk about The Diary of a Nobody with authors John Mitchinson, Andy Miller, and Laura Cumming.

In 2020, Higgins reprised the role of Laars Head; going on to write, perform and produce the comedy podcast Laars Head’s Supernornal.

In November 2021, Higgins shared on Twitter a drawing made by his young son in response to the prompt “safe,” depicting himself lying between his parents. The post received approximately 50,000 likes and more than 4,000 reposts, and was widely reshared across social media. The image was further amplified by outlets including Upworthy and spread extensively across platforms, where it accumulated millions of engagements and tens of millions of impressions in aggregate.

Since 2022, E O Higgins has been writing, hosting, and producing the weekly history podcast The English Eccentric.

In November 2024, Higgins launched the comedy podcast Inside Henry’s Head, co-hosted with his 'neuro-fantastic' son Henry, in which they explore whatever topics have intrigued Henry that month. The first episode covered the dodo and the mangelwurzel.

In 2025, under his alter ego Laars Head, Higgins wrote the satirical novel Jack of All Trades: The Untold Lives of Jack the Ripper.
