= Missileman =

Missileman or Missile Men or variation, may refer to:

- Missile combat crew, a team of highly trained specialists, oft-called missilemen, manning missile systems
- Missileman U, a nickname for the Florida Institute of Technology
- Missileman, a chapter of the Japanese manga comic Hunter X Hunter, see List of Hunter × Hunter chapters

== See also ==
- Infantry Anti-Tank Missileman Leaders Course at the United States Marine Corps School of Infantry
- Field Artillery Missileman's Badge
- Master Missileman Badge
- Missile (disambiguation)
- Missileer (disambiguation)
- Rocket Man (disambiguation)
- Rocketeer (disambiguation)
