= Astronaut (disambiguation) =

An astronaut is a person trained by a human spaceflight program to command, pilot, or serve as a crew member of a spacecraft.

Astronaut or astronauts may also refer to:

== Music ==
- The Astronauts (band), a 1960s American surf band
- "The Astronaut" (song), a 2022 song by Jin of BTS
- Astronauts (band), 2010s British band
- Astronaut (Duran Duran album), 2004
- Astronaut (Salem Al Fakir album), 2009
- Astronaut (Ash Walker album), 2023
- Astronaut, a 2006 EP by Unheilig
- "Astronaut" (song), a 2011 song by Simple Plan
- "Astronaut", a song by Beach House, from the album Devotion
- "Astronaut", a song by Gregory Alan Isakov from The Weatherman
- "Astronaut", a song by Luna from Rendezvous
- "Astronaut", the debut video single by Amanda Palmer for her album Who Killed Amanda Palmer
- "Astronaut", a song by Stray Kids from Clé: Levanter

== Film ==
- The Astronauts (film), a 1960 live television play
- The Astronaut (1972 film), a science fiction film
- Astronaut: The Last Push, a 2012 science fiction film directed by Eric Hayden
- Astronaut (2019 film), a Canadian drama film
- Astronaut (2025 film), a Peruvian-Colombian-Uruguayan drama film
- The Astronaut (2025 film), an American science fiction thriller film
- Astronaut, a character from the 2005 film Zathura: A Space Adventure

== Other ==
- Astronauts (TV series), a 1981–1983 British sitcom
- Astronot, a 2012 action-adventure platform game
- A name for a Hong Kong returnee
- The Astronauts, a 1951 novel by Polish writer Stanisław Lem
- The Astronauts (company), a Polish video game development company
- The Astronauts (TV series), a 2020 American television series from Nickelodeon

== See also ==
- Human spaceflight
- Spaceman (disambiguation)
- Cosmonaut (disambiguation)
- Rocket Man (disambiguation)
- Rocketeer (disambiguation)
