= List of shipwrecks in January 1857 =

The list of shipwrecks in January 1857 includes ships sunk, wrecked or otherwise lost during January 1857.

== 1 January ==
List of shipwrecks: 1 January 1857
Ship	State	Description
Alma	United Kingdom	The ship was damaged in a gale at Malta.
Alacrity	United Kingdom	The ship was driven ashore and wrecked at Malta.
Auguste Willman	United Kingdom	The ship was damaged in a gale at Malta.
Brenda	United Kingdom	The steamship was driven into another ship and damaged at Malta. she was on a voyage from Constantinople, Ottoman Empire, to London.
Clemanthe	United Kingdom	The ship was damaged in a gale at Malta.
Dunaskin	United Kingdom	The steamship foundered off Penzance, Cornwall with the loss of all twelve crew. She was on a voyage from Lisbon, Portugal, to Bristol, Gloucestershire.
Elizabeth Lewis	United Kingdom	The ship was damaged in a gale at Malta.
Ferdinand	Kingdom of the Two Sicilies	The schooner was driven ashore at Malta.
Hannah	United Kingdom	The brig ran aground at South Shields, County Durham. She was on a voyage from Rotterdam, South Holland, Netherlands to South Shields. She was refloated the next day with the assistance of three tugs and taken in to South Shields.
Henry Holman	United Kingdom	The ship was damaged in a gale at Malta.
Iona	United Kingdom	The ship was wrecked on Buck Island, off Grand Manan, New Brunswick, British North America. Her crew were rescued. She was on a voyage from Saint John, New Brunswick to Liverpool, Lancashire.
Johannes Kepler	Rostock	The ship was driven ashore. She was on a voyage from Rostock to an English port. She was refloated and towed in to Copenhagen, Denmark in a leaky condition.
Mariner	United Kingdom	The brig was driven ashore and wrecked at Marsamxett Harbour, Malta. Her crew were rescued by the brig Concettina ( Kingdom of the Two Sicilies).
Pallas	United Kingdom	The ship was driven ashore at "Hornbeck", Denmark. She was refloated on 11 January and towed in to Helsingør, Denmark.
Providence	United Kingdom	The ship was damaged in a gale at Malta.
Thor	United Kingdom	The ship was damaged in a gale at Malta.
Victoria	United Kingdom	The ship was damaged in a gale at Malta.
Wilhelmine	Netherlands	The galiot was severely damaged in a gale at Malta.
Point of Ayr Lifeboat	United Kingdom	The lifeboat capsized off Rhyl, Denbighshire whilst going to the aid of a brigantine which sank off Abergele. All thirteen crew were drowned.
Unnamed	United Kingdom	The brigantine sank off Abergele. Her fourteen crew were rescued by the Rhyl Lifeboat.
Unnamed	United Kingdom	The sloop was driven ashore near Prestatyn, Flintshire. Her crew were rescued by the Hoylake Lifeboat.

== 2 January ==
List of shipwrecks: 2 January 1857
Ship	State	Description
Adelaide	United Kingdom	The ship struck The Plough and was damaged. She put in to Lindisfarne, Northumberland.
Alacrity	United Kingdom	The brig was driven ashore at Malta. She was consequently condemned.
Blossom	United Kingdom	The ship foundered in the North Sea off the coast of Northumberland. Her crew were rescued.
HMS Cracker	Royal Navy	The gunboat broke from her anchors and ran aground in Sliema Creek, Malta. She was refloated with assistance from HMS Fancy and HMS Recruit (both Royal Navy).
Ferdinand	Kingdom of the Two Sicilies	The brig was driven ashore and wrecked at Powder Magazine Point, Malta.
Hannah	United Kingdom	The ship was driven ashore 8 nautical miles (15 km) south of Helsingør, Denmark. She was on a voyage from Copenhagen, Denmark, to an English port. She was refloated the next day and taken in to Helsingør.
Innes	United Kingdom	The ship struck The Plough and partly sank. She was on a voyage from South Shields, County Durham, to Arbroath, Forfarshire. She was refloated on 10 January and was towed in to Berwick upon Tweed, Northumberland for repairs.
Mariner	United Kingdom	The ship was wrecked on a reef off Vindicari Island, Kingdom of the Two Sicilies. Her crew were rescued. She was on a voyage from Alexandria, Egypt, to London.
Mehemet Ali	France	The full-rigged ship was driven ashore and wrecked on Gozo, Malta with the loss of three of her crew. She was on a voyage from Trieste to Algiers, Algeria.

== 3 January ==
List of shipwrecks: 3 January 1857
Ship	State	Description
Adelaide	United Kingdom	The ship was driven ashore at Milford Haven, Pembrokeshire. She had been refloated by 13 January.
Ann	United Kingdom	The brig was wrecked at Aberystwyth, Cardiganshire.
Celerity	United Kingdom	The fishing smack was run down and sunk 4 nautical miles (7.4 km) north east of the Sunk Lightship ( Trinity House) by the paddle steamer City of London (United Kingdom) with the loss of two of her crew. Survivors were rescued by City of London.
Courier	United Kingdom	The barque foundered in the Mediterranean Sea with the loss of a crew member. Survivors were rescued by the brig Eden L. ( Austrian Empire). Courier was on a voyage from Alexandria, Egypt, to an English port.
Don Quixote	Bremen	The ship was driven ashore at Seaham, County Durham, United Kingdom. Her crew were rescued. She was on a voyage from Bremen to Newcastle upon Tyne, Northumberland, United Kingdom.
Duchess of Northumberland	United Kingdom	The schooner foundered off the coast of County Durham with the loss of all four crew. She was on a voyage from Memel, Prussia, to Arbroath, Forfarshire.
Eliza	United Kingdom	The ship was driven ashore at Milford Haven. She had been refloated by 13 January.
Forester	United Kingdom	The ship was driven ashore and severely damaged at Milford Haven.
Georges Clemencia	France	The ship was driven ashore at "Gamark", near Tunis, Beylik of Tunis. Her crew were rescued. She was on a voyage from Cardiff, Glamorgan, to Tunis.
Koningen der Nederlanden	Netherlands	The ship ran aground at Milford Haven and was severely damaged. She was refloated on 12 January.
Letitia	United Kingdom	The ship was driven ashore at Milford Haven.
Maria	United Kingdom	The brig was severely damaged in the Firth of Forth with the loss of a crew member. She was on a voyage from London to Newcastle upon Tyne. She was towed in to Leith, Lothian.
Maria and Martha	United Kingdom	The ship was driven ashore at Milford Haven. She had been refloated by 13 January.
Mary Ann	United Kingdom	The ship was driven ashore and wrecked at Milford Haven.
Prudence and Betsey	United Kingdom	The ship was driven ashore at Milford Haven.
Sarah and Ann	United Kingdom	The ship was driven ashore near Rhymney, Glamorgan. She was on a voyage from Newport, Monmouthshire, to Lisbon, Portugal.
Triumph	United Kingdom	The ship was driven ashore at Dragør, Denmark. She was on a voyage from Stettin to an English port. She was refloated and taken in to Copenhagen, Denmark in a leaky condition.
Tweed	United Kingdom	The ship was driven ashore and wrecked at Milford Haven.
Union	United Kingdom	The ship was driven ashore and severely damaged at Milford Haven.

== 4 January ==
List of shipwrecks: 4 January 1857
Ship	State	Description
Abeona	United Kingdom	The coaster, a brig, was driven ashore and severely damaged at Sandsend, Yorkshire. Her crew were rescued.
Absalom, or Epsilon	United Kingdom	The brig foundered in the North Sea off Craster, Northumberland with the loss of all hands. She was on a voyage from South Shields, County Durham, to Havre de Grâce, Seine-Inférieure, France.
Agenoria	United Kingdom	The brig was driven ashore at Great Yarmouth, Norfolk. Her crew survived.
Agnes	United Kingdom	The coaster was driven ashore at Middleton, County Durham. Her crew were rescued. She was refloated on 10 January and taken in to Hartlepool, County Durham.
Alma	United Kingdom	The schooner foundered in the North Sea off Cullercoats, Northumberland with the loss of all hands. A boat and wreckage from the ship washed up there.
Amelia	United Kingdom	The brig foundered in Runswick Bay with the loss of all hands.
Ann	United Kingdom	The schooner was driven ashore and wrecked at Bawdsey, Suffolk. Her crew were rescued.
Ann	United Kingdom	The smack was driven ashore in Abergele Bay with the loss of her captain.
Anne	United Kingdom	The brig was driven ashore near Marske-by-the-Sea, Yorkshire. Her crew were rescued by the Redcar Lifeboat. She was on a voyage from Torquay, Devon, to Hartlepool. Anne was refloated on 11 January and towed in to West Hartlepool, County Durham.
Argus	Denmark	The brig was wrecked on Læsø. Her crew were rescued.
Athelstan	United Kingdom	The ship ran aground 18 nautical miles (33 km) east of Demerara, British Guiana. She was on a voyage from Calcutta, India, to Demerara.
Atlantic	United Kingdom	The brig was driven ashore 5 nautical miles (9.3 km) south of Bridlington, Yorkshire. She was refloated on 12 January and towed in to South Shields.
Ayres	United Kingdom	The ship was driven ashore and wrecked at Seaton, County Durham.
Carus, or Eurus	United Kingdom	The ship was driven ashore at Scarborough, Yorkshire. Her crew were rescued.
Chance	United Kingdom	The ship was driven ashore and wrecked at Seaton. She was on a voyage from Whitstable, Kent, to Hartlepool.
Colchester	United Kingdom	The schooner was driven ashore on the coast of Northumberland.
Commodore	United Kingdom	The brig was driven ashore and wrecked at East Tarbert, Wigtownshire. Her crew were rescued. She was on a voyage from Riga, Russia, to Newry, County Antrim.
Curlew	United Kingdom	The ship was driven ashore at Great Yarmouth. Her crew survived. She was on a voyage from Hartlepool to London.
Dalkeith	United Kingdom	The ship was beached at Berwick upon Tweed, Northumberland. She was refloated the next day and towed in to Berwick upon Tweed.
Duke	United Kingdom	The ship was driven ashore and damaged at Middleton with the loss of a crew member. She was on a voyage from Seaham, County Durham, to King's Lynn, Norfolk. She was refloated on 8 January and towed in to Hartlepool.
Eagle	United Kingdom	The ship was driven ashore at Great Yarmouth. Her crew survived.
Earl of Clancarty	United Kingdom	The ship foundered in the North Sea off the coast of County Durham with the loss of all but two of her crew.
Eidendensche	Netherlands	The galiot foundered in the North Sea off the coast of County Durham.
Eleanor	United Kingdom	The smack was driven ashore in Abergele Bay. Her crew were rescued.
Empress	United Kingdom	The brigantine ran aground on the Longscar Rocks. She floated off but was driven ashore and wrecked at Seaton with the loss of all but four of her twelve crew.
Emulous	United Kingdom	The ship was run ashore in the River Tees. She was on a voyage from West Hartlepool, County Durham, to London. She was refloated on 13 January and taken in to Middlesbrough, Yorkshire.
Enterprise	United Kingdom	The schooner was driven ashore and wrecked at Newbiggin, Northumberland with the loss of all hands.
Epsilon	United Kingdom	The brig foundered in the North Sea off Dunstanburgh Castle, Northumberland with the loss of all hands.
Era	United Kingdom	The brig was driven ashore near Blackhalls, County Durham. Her crew were rescued by rocket apparatus.
Factor	United Kingdom	The ship was driven ashore at Ramsey, Isle of Man.
Fairy	United Kingdom	The brig was driven ashore at Great Yarmouth. Her crew survived.
Fanny Bailey	United Kingdom	The ship was in collision with a hulk and was beached at Hubberstone Pill, Pembrokeshire in a severely damaged condition. She was on a voyage from Liverpool, Lancashire, to Livorno, Grand Duchy of Tuscany.
George	United Kingdom	The ship was driven ashore in Robin Hoods Bay. Her crew were rescued.
Georgina	United Kingdom	The schooner was driven ashore and wrecked at Low Hauxley, Northumberland. Her five crew were rescued by the Hauxley Lifeboat.
George IV	United Kingdom	The ship struck the pier sank at Hartlepool. She was on a voyage from London to Hartlepool.
Gulterus	United Kingdom	The brig was driven ashore and severely damaged at Warkworth, Northumberland. Her crew were rescued. She was on a voyage from South Shields to Hull, Yorkshire or vice versa. Gulterus was refloated on 12 January and taken in to Warkworth.
Happy Family	United Kingdom	The ship was driven ashore at Great Yarmouth. Her crew survived.
Happy Return	United Kingdom	The fishing smack was driven ashore south of Scarborough. Her crew were rescued.
Hebbert	United Kingdom	The ship was driven ashore and wrecked at Seaton.
Helvellyn	United Kingdom	The barque ran aground and sank in the English Channel with the loss of one of her ten crew. Survivors were rescued by Empress (United Kingdom).
Industry	United Kingdom	The schooner was driven ashore near the Girdle Ness Lighthouse, Aberdeenshire. Her crew were rescued by the Aberdeen Lifeboat. She was on a voyage from Newcastle upon Tyne, Northumberland, to Beauly, Inverness-shire. She was refloated on 8 January and taken in to Aberdeen.
Isabella	United Kingdom	The ship was driven ashore at Bridlington. She was refloated on 10 January and taken in to Bridlington.
James Bailes	United Kingdom	The brig was driven ashore at Sunderland. Her crew were rescued by rocket apparatus.
Jane	United Kingdom	The ship was driven ashore at Redcar. Her crew were rescued.
Jane	United Kingdom	The brig was driven ashore at Saltburn-by-the-Sea, County Durham. Her crew survived. She was on a voyage from Rochester, Kent, to Sunderland.
Janet and Mary	United Kingdom	The brig struck the pier and sank at Sunderland with the loss of a crew member.
Janet Walls	United Kingdom	The schooner was driven ashore at Great Yarmouth. Her crew survived. She was refloated on 15 January.
John French	United Kingdom	The brig foundered off the mouth of the Humber with the loss of all hands.
Jubilee	United Kingdom	The ship was driven ashore and wrecked at Seaton.
Lady Aberdour	United Kingdom	The ship sank at Hartlepool.
Lark	United Kingdom	The ship was driven ashore at Great Yarmouth. Her crew survived. She was refloated on 15 January and taken in to Great Yarmouth.
Laura	United Kingdom	The brig was driven ashore at Withernsea, Yorkshire. Her nine crew survived. She was on a voyage from Rochester to South Shields. She was refloated on 12 January and towed in to Hull.
La Vigie	France	The ship ran aground on the Mussel Scarp, in the North Sea.
Lavinia	United Kingdom	The brig was driven ashore at Withernsea. Her crew were rescued.
Lively	(United Kingdom of Great Britain and Ireland) Guernsey	The ship was driven ashore at Whitby, Yorkshire. Her crew were rescued. She was refloated on 11 January and taken in to Whitby.
Margaret	United Kingdom	The brig was driven ashore at Withernsea. Her crew were rescued by the Coast Guard. She was refloated on 11 January and towed to Bridlington, where she went ashore. She was again refloated and taken in to Bridlington.
Margaretha	Danzig	The ship ran aground near "Cappeln" and was wrecked. Her crew were rescued. She was on a voyage from Danzig to London.
Margaret Dean	United Kingdom	The ship was driven ashore on the Swash, in the Bristol Channel. She was on a voyage from Bristol, Gloucestershire, to Liverpool.
Marshall Welton	United Kingdom	The sloop sank in the Irish Sea north of Abergele, Denbighshire. Her crew were rescued by the Rhyl Lifeboat.
Mary	United Kingdom	The brig was driven ashore at Hartlepool. Her crew were rescued by rocket apparatus.
Mary and Ann	United Kingdom	The schooner foundered in the North Sea off Robin Hood's Bay with the loss of all hands.
Mary Anne	United Kingdom	The coaster was driven ashore at Whitby.
Mary Jane	United Kingdom	The coaster, a schooner, was driven ashore at Landsend, 3 nautical miles (5.6 km) from Whitby. Her crew were rescued.
Marys	United Kingdom	The ship was driven ashore at Old Hartlepool with the loss of two of her crew.
Medora	United Kingdom	The coaster, a brig, was driven ashore 1 nautical mile (1.9 km) north of Whitby. Her crew were rescued. She was refloated on 11 January and taken in to Whitby.
Native	United Kingdom	The coaster was driven ashore and wrecked at Middleton. Her crew were rescued.
New Happy Return	United Kingdom	The ship was driven ashore and wrecked at Newton-by-the-Sea, Northumberland. Her crew were rescued.
Northumberland	United Kingdom	The brig was driven ashore at Scarborough. Her crew were rescued by the Scarborough Lifeboat. She was on a voyage from London to Sunderland.
Nymph	United Kingdom	The ship was driven ashore and wrecked at Middleton.
Pandora	United Kingdom	The ship struck the pier and sank at Hartlepool. She was on a voyage from London to Hartlepool. She was refloated on 9 January.
Pekin	United Kingdom	The East Indiaman was wrecked on the Herd Sand, in the North Sea off the coast of County Durham.
Penelope	United Kingdom	The brig was driven ashore at Scarborough. She was refloated and taken in to Scarborough.
Perseverance	United Kingdom	The ship was driven ashore and wrecked at Kilnsea, Yorkshire with the loss of four of her crew. She was on a voyage from Newcastle upon Tyne, Northumberland, to Copenhagen, Denmark.
Peter and Mary	United Kingdom	The schooner foundered in Runswick Bay with the loss of all hands.
Port Glasgow	United Kingdom	The coaster, a schooner was driven ashore 4 nautical miles (7.4 km) north of Whitby. Her crew were rescued. She was refloated on 9 January and towed in to Whitby in a severely leaky condition.
Queen Dowager	United Kingdom	The schooner was driven ashore in Robin Hoods Bay. Her crew were rescued. She had become a wreck by 8 January.
Ratcliffe	United Kingdom	The brig was driven ashore at Filey, East Riding of Yorkshire. Her nine crew were rescued by the Filey Lifeboat.
Reform	United Kingdom	The ship foundered off Cullercoats with the loss of all hands.
Sarah Ellen	United Kingdom	The brig was wrecked on the Herd Sand with the loss of a crew member. Survivors were rescued by the South Shields Lifeboat. She was on a voyage from London to South Shields.
Sargefleet	United Kingdom	The ship was driven ashore at Wainfleet, Lincolnshire with the loss of nine crew. She was on a voyage from Amsterdam, North Holland, Netherlands to Hartlepool.
Seven Dolores	United Kingdom	The barque was driven ashore at Hartlepool. Her crew were rrescued by rocket apparatus.
Seven	United Kingdom	The brig sank at Middleton. Her crew were rescued. She was on a voyage from London to South Shields.
Sisters	Denmark	The sloop was driven ashore at Dunbar, Lothian, United Kingdom. Her crew were reported missing. She was on a voyage from Nyborg to Leith, Lothian.
Sophie	Portugal	The brig was driven ashore and wrecked at Warkworth. Her eleven crew were rescued by the Hauxley Lifeboat.
Speculator	United Kingdom	The sloop was driven into Danube (United Kingdom of Great Britain and Ireland) British North America and was damaged by her anchor at Milford Haven.
Stanley	United Kingdom	The coaster was driven ashore at Middleton. Her crew were rescued. She was refloated on 10 January and taken in to Hartlepool.
Thomas and Elizabeth	United Kingdom	The ship was driven ashore at Great Yarmouth. Her crew survived.
Thomas Gowland	United Kingdom	The ship was driven ashore at Great Yarmouth. Her crew survived. She was on a voyage from Sunderland to Rochefort, Charente-Inférieure, France. Thomas Gowland had become a wreck by 10 January.
The Thompsons	United Kingdom	The brig was driven ashore at Scarborough. Her crew were rescued by the Scarborough Lifeboat.
Union	United Kingdom	The ship was driven ashore and damaged at Middleton. She was refloated on 10 January and taken in to Hartlepool.
Vivid	United Kingdom	The ship foundered in the North Sea off Cresswell, Northumberland with the loss of all hands.
William IV	United Kingdom	The Billyboy schooner was driven ashore at Filey. Her crew were rescued by rocket apparatus. She was on a voyage from London to South Shields. She was refloated.
William Pitt	United Kingdom	The coaster, a brig, was driven ashore at Whitby. Her crew were rescued. She was refloated on 18 January and taken in to Whitby in a severely damaged condition.
Wilsons	United Kingdom	The brig was wrecked on the Ramsdale Scar Rocks, on the coast of Yorkshire with the loss of a crew member. Survivors were rescued by the Scarborough Lifeboat. She was on a voyage from London to the River Tyne.
Wubbe	Sweden	The schooner was wrecked on Læsø with the loss of two of her crew. She was on a voyage from Hull to Uddevalla.
Zephyrus	United Kingdom	The brig sank at Hartlepool.

== 5 January ==
List of shipwrecks: 5 January 1857
Ship	State	Description
Active	United Kingdom	The schooner was wrecked on the Herd Sand, in the North Sea off the coast of County Durham. Her twenty crew were rescued by the South Shields Lifeboat. She was on a voyage from Whitstable, Kent, to South Shields, County Durham. Activewas refloated on 14 February and towed in to Blyth, Northumberland.
Agnes Brown	United Kingdom	The schooner was driven ashore at Kessingland, Suffolk.
Alexis Pierre Aimée	France	The lugger was wrecked on the Herd Sand. Her crew were rescued by the South Shields Lifeboat. She was on a voyage from Dunkirk, Nord to South Shields.
Apollo	United Kingdom	The ship struck the pier and sank at Sunderland, County Durham with the loss of a crew member.
Aurora	United Kingdom	The schooner foundered off Sunderland with the loss of all hands. She came ashore at Souter Point, County Durham in a capsized condition.
Banbury	United Kingdom	The brig foundered in the North Sea 2 nautical miles (3.7 km) north north east of Scarborough Castle, Yorkshire with the loss of all hands.
Boadicea	United Kingdom	The barque was wrecked on Herm, Channel Islands with the loss of nine of her fourteen crew. Survivors were rescued by HMRC Blonde and HMRC Eagle (both Board of Customs). Boadicea was on a voyage from Alexandria, Egypt, to Antwerp, Belgium.
Cromarty	United Kingdom	The schooner was wrecked 2 nautical miles (3.7 km) from Dunbar, Lothian with the loss of all hands, at least three lives.
Curlew	United Kingdom	The brig was wrecked at Great Yarmouth, Norfolk. Her crew were rescued by the Great Yarmouth Lifeboat
Eclipse	United Kingdom	The ship was driven ashore at "Hawthorn Hive", County Durham. Her crew were rescued. She was on a voyage from Ipswich, Suffolk, to Seaham, County Durham.
Emily	United Kingdom	The brig was driven ashore and wrecked at Hawthorn Dene, County Durham. Her crew were rescued.
Emily	United Kingdom	The ship was driven ashore and wrecked at Sunderland. Her crew were rescued. She was on a voyage from London to Sunderland.
Emma	United Kingdom	The barque was driven ashore and wrecked at Redcar, Yorkshire. Her nine crew were rescued by the Redcar Lifeboat.
Enterprise	United Kingdom	The ship ran aground on the Blackshaw Bank. She had been refloated by 15 January and taken in to Glencaple, Dumfriesshire.
Fifteen	United Kingdom	The brig was driven ashore at Grimsby, Lincolnshire with the loss of her captain. She was refloated on 12 January and towed in to Grimsby.
Gretina	Bremen	The schooner was driven ashore at Blyth, Northumberland. Her crew were rescued. She was on a voyage from Dysart, Fife, to Leer, Kingdom of Hanover. Gretina was refloated on 12 February and towed in to the River Tyne for repairs.
Hannah	United Kingdom	The ship was driven ashore at "Niava", 8 nautical miles (15 km) south of Helsingør, Denmark. She was on a voyage from Copenhagen, Denmark, to an English port. She was refloated and taken in to Helsingør.
Helene	Danzig	The ship was driven ashore near Cuxhaven. She was on a voyage from Danzig to Hull.
Isabella	Norway	The ship was driven ashore on Eierland, North Holland, Netherlands. She was on a voyage from Drammen to London, United Kingdom.
Jane and Betsey Fox	United Kingdom	The ship was in collision with Coringa (United Kingdom) in the River Mersey. She was beached at Woodside, Cheshire.
Les Trois Sœurs	France	The schooner was driven ashore and wrecked at Sunderland. Her crew were rescued by rocket apparatus. She was on a voyage from Cherbourg, Seine-Inférieure to Sunderland. She had been refloated by 9 January and taken in to Sunderland.
Lille Asa	Denmark	The ship was discovered derelict in the North Sea. She was on a voyage from Hartlepool to Helsingør.
Lion	United Kingdom	The ship was driven ashore at Strangford, County Antrim.
Mary Louise	France	The schooner was driven ashore and wrecked at Redcar.
Nancy	Sweden	The barque was destroyed by fire off the mouth of the Tagus. Her crew were rescued by Abel Gower (United Kingdom). Nancy was on a voyage from Hamburg to Rio de Janeiro, Brazil.
Ninus	United Kingdom	The ship ran aground at Boulogne, Pas-de-Calais, France. Her crew were rescued. She was on a voyage from Hartlepool to Boulogne. Ninus broke up on 9 January.
Northern Belle	United States	Northern Belle. The passenger ship, a barque, was driven ashore at Foreness Point, Kent, United Kingdom. Her crew were rescued by Culmer White, Mary White, and Ocean (all United Kingdom). Northern Belle was on a voyage from New York to London.
One	United Kingdom	The schooner was driven ashore and wrecked near Ryhope, County Durham. Her crew were rescued.
Peggy	United Kingdom	The brig was driven ashore and wrecked at Corton, Suffolk with the loss of all but her captain of her five crew.
Richard Foley	United Kingdom	The ship was driven ashore at Clee Ness, Lincolnshire.
Rienzi	United Kingdom	The brig was driven ashore and wrecked at Hendon, County Durham. Her crew were rescued.
Reliance	United Kingdom	The ship was driven ashore near Walmer Castle, Kent. Her eight crew were rescued by the Walmer Lifeboat. She was on a voyage from London to Colón, Republic of New Granada. Reliance was refloated on 7 February and towed in to Ramsgate, Kent, where she sank.
Stour	United Kingdom	The brig was wrecked on the Black Middens, in the North Sea off the mouth of the River Tyne. Her crew were rescued by the South Shields Lifeboat.
Tennant	United Kingdom	The brig ran aground on the Newcombe Sand, in the North Sea off the coast of Suffolk and was wrecked. Her eight crew were rescued by the Lowestoft Lifeboat. She was refloated on 10 January and taken in to Lowestoft, Suffolk.
Victory	United Kingdom	The lugger foundered with the loss of all ten crew whilst going to the assistance of Northern Belle (United States). The lugger Ocean (United Kingdom) almost foundered going to the assistance of Victory.
Violet	United Kingdom	The paddle steamer was wrecked on the Goodwin Sands, Kent with the loss of all nineteen people on board. The first steamship lost on the Goodwin Sands, she was on a voyage from Ostend, West Flanders, Belgium to Dover, Kent.

== 6 January ==
List of shipwrecks: 6 January 1857
Ship	State	Description
Blenheim, and Garland	United Kingdom	The ships were in collision off the Garmoyle Lighthouse, County Antrim and were severely damaged. Blenheim was on a voyage from Liverpool, Lancashire, to Belfast, County Antrim. Garland was on a voyage from Liverpool to Londonderry. Both vessels were taken in to Belfast.
Blenheim	United Kingdom	The brig was driven ashore and wrecked at Corton, Suffolk.
Cathinka	Wismar	The brig was driven ashore near West Hartlepool, County Durham. Her crew were rescued.
C. Vanderbilt	United States	The 1,041-gross register ton Stonington Line sidewheel paddle steamer, a coastal passenger ship, was driven aground in Long Island Sound on the west end of Fishers Island off the coast of Connecticut during a winter storm without loss of life. She was refloated, repaired, and returned to service later in 1857.
Darlington	United Kingdom	The ship was driven ashore at Lowestoft, Suffolk. She was on a voyage from South Shields to London. She was refloated on 18 January and towed in to Lowestoft.
Elizabeth	United Kingdom	The ship was driven ashore at Ingoldmells, Lincolnshire with the loss of two lives. She was on a voyage from Great Yarmouth, Norfolk, to Wakefield, Yorkshire.
Exley	United Kingdom	The sloop was driven ashore on the Isle of Sheppey, Kent. She was on a voyage from the Isle of Wight to Grangemouth, Stirlingshire.
Harmony	United Kingdom	The barque was driven ashore near "Warren Water", County Durham. Her thirteen crew were rescued. She was on a voyage from South Shields to Liverpool.
Hermine	United Kingdom	The barque was wrecked on the Ross Sands with the loss of a crew member.
Ida	United Kingdom	The ship was abandoned in the North Sea 120 nautical miles (220 km) off Flamborough Head, Yorkshire. Her crew were rescued by the barque Prince Albert (Norway). Ida was on a voyage from Danzig to London.
Ion	United Kingdom	The brig was driven ashore at the entrance to the Strangford Lough.
Jessie and Betty	United Kingdom	The ship collided with Coringa (United Kingdom) and was beached at Woodside, Cheshire.
Lion	United States	The ship was driven ashore and damaged at Kingsdown, Kent, United Kingdom with the loss of two of her crew. She was on a voyage from London to Callao, Peru. Lion was refloated on 9 January and towed in to Ramsgate, Kent in a leaky condition.
Marie Louise	Stettin	The ship was driven ashore and wrecked at Redcar, Yorkshire, United Kingdom. Her crew were rescued. She was on a voyage from Stettin to Newcastle upon Tyne, Northumberland.
Neerlands Indie	Netherlands	The ship ran aground in the Yangtze and was damaged. She was on a voyage from Amoy to Shanghai, China. She was refloated and taken in to Shanghai for repairs.
Newcastle	United Kingdom	The ship foundered in the North Sea off Hook of Holland, South Holland, Netherlands. Her crew were rescued by the lifeboat Willem van Houten (Netherlands).
Pacific	United Kingdom	The barque foundered off Cape Finisterre, Spain. Her crew were rescued by William Ash (United Kingdom).
Pauline	France	The schooner was driven ashore at Corton. She was on a voyage from Amble, Northumberland, to Bordeaux, Gironde.
Rainbow	United Kingdom	The fishing smack ran aground at Scarborough, Yorkshire with the loss of a crew member.
Reliance	United Kingdom	The barque was wrecked on the Goodwin Sands, Kent. Her ten crew were rescued by the lifeboat Royal Thames Yacht Club (United Kingdom, performing its first rescue. Reliance was on a voyage from London to Ceylon.
Rockcliff	United Kingdom	The ship was driven ashore and wrecked at Hollesley, Suffolk with the loss of five of her crew. Survivors were rescued by the Coast Guard She was on a voyage from Hartlepool, County Durham, to London.
Rocketer	United Kingdom	The brig was driven ashore and wrecked at Orford Haven, Suffolk with the loss of five of her nine crew.
Sarah	United Kingdom	The brig was wrecked on the Whitaker Spit, in the North Sea off the coast of Suffolk. Her crew were rescued.
Samuel Cunard	United Kingdom	The barque was wrecked on the Burmiston Rock, on the coast of Yorkshire with the loss of one of her twelve crew. Two survivors swam ashore, the remainder were rescued by rocket apparatus. She was on a voyage from Gothenburg, Sweden, to Exeter, Devon.
Sisters	United Kingdom	The ship was driven ashore at Wicklow.
Son of Strangford	United Kingdom	The ship was driven ashore at the entrance to the Strangford Lough.
Theodore	Austrian Empire	The ship was wrecked at Porthcawl, Glamorgan, United Kingdom.
Whitby	United Kingdom	The ship was driven ashore 6 nautical miles (11 km) north of Scarborough.
Zephyr	United Kingdom	The brig was driven ashore at Great Yarmouth.

== 7 January ==
List of shipwrecks: 7 January 1857
Ship	State	Description
Alert	United Kingdom	The ship was driven ashore at Sutton-on-Sea, Lincolnshire. She was on a voyage from London to Newcastle upon Tyne, Northumberland.
Antje	Kingdom of Hanover	The ship was driven ashore near Delfzijl, Groningen, Netherlands. She was on a voyage from Emden to London.
British Merchant	United Kingdom	The ship was wrecked off Bermuda. She was on a voyage from Alexandria, Egypt, to New York, United States.
Cheverell	United Kingdom	The barque ran aground off Minsmere, Suffolk, England, and was wrecked. Her crew were rescued. She was on a voyage from Newcastle upon Tyne, Northumberland, to London.
Cornelius Grinell	United States	The ship ran aground on the Diamond Reef. she was on a voyage from New York to London. She was refloated and put back to New York in a leaky condition.
Cultivator	United Kingdom	The ship was driven ashore by ice in the East River, New York. She was on a voyage from New York to Liverpool, Lancashire. She was refloated and placed under repair.
Elizabeth	United Kingdom	The ship was driven ashore at Wainfleet, Lincolnshire with the loss of two lives. She was on a voyage from Great Yarmouth, Norfolk, to Wakefield, Yorkshire.
Eva	United Kingdom	The brig was driven ashore at Blackwall, Middlesex. Her crew were rescued.
Foreningen	Sweden	The ship was driven ashore and wrecked at Happisburgh, Norfolk, United Kingdom.
Julia	United Kingdom	The ship was driven ashore south of Grimsby, Lincolnshire. She was on a voyage from Hull, Yorkshire, to London.
Legouillon	France	The ship ran aground on the Barnard Sand, in the North Sea off the coast of Suffolk. She was on a voyage from Newcastle upon Tyne, Northumberland, United Kingdom to Algiers, Algeria. She was refloated and assisted in to Lowestoft, Suffolk in a leaky condition.
Themis	France	The ship ran aground on the Newcombe Sand, in the North Sea off the coast of Suffolk. She was refloated and taken in to Lowestoft in a leaky condition.
Victor	Sweden	The barque ran aground on the Sodra Haken, off the coast of Sweden. She was on a voyage from Stockholm to Newcastle upon Tyne, Northumberland, United Kingdom. She was refloated on 12 January and taken in to Landskrona.

== 8 January ==
List of shipwrecks: 8 January 1857
Ship	State	Description
Alacrity	United Kingdom	The barque was driven ashore and wrecked at Malta.
Alfina Egbardina	Danzig	The ship ran aground on the Kentish Knock. She was on a voyage from Danzig to Guernsey, Channel Islands. She was refloated and taken in to Ramsgate, Kent, United Kingdom.
Columbus	United Kingdom	The barque was driven ashore at St Mawes Castle, Cornwall. She was refloated on 10 January and beached.
Dreadnought, and West Point	United Kingdom	The tug Dreadnought and the ship West Point were driven ashore in the Rock Channel. West Point was on a voyage from New York to Liverpool, Lancashire. She was refloated on 8 January and taken in to Liverpool.
Julia	United Kingdom	The ship was driven ashore at Grimsby, Lincolnshire. She was on a voyage from Hull, Yorkshire, to London.
Little Swanley	(United Kingdom of Great Britain and Ireland) Jamaica	The sloop was driven ashore and wrecked in Holland Bay.
Mary Ann	United Kingdom	The ship ran aground on the Horse Bank, in the Irish Sea off the coast of Lancashire and sank. Her crew were rescued. She was on a voyage from Amlwch, Anglesey, to Runcorn, Cheshire.
Thomas	France	The ship ran aground on the Newcombe Sand, in the North Sea off the coast of Suffolk, United Kingdom. She was refloated and taken in to Lowestoft, Suffolk in a leaky condition.
Uncle Charlie	United Kingdom	The barque was lost near Jaffa, Ottoman Syria. Her crew were rescued.

== 9 January ==
List of shipwrecks: 9 January 1857
Ship	State	Description
Margaret Smith	United Kingdom	The ship was wrecked on Inagua, Bahamas. She was on a voyage from Cap-Haïtien, Haiti, to the Clyde.
Sabrina	United Kingdom	The ship ran aground on the Dean Sand, in The Solent. She was on a voyage from London to Melbourne, Victoria. She was refloated with assistance from the tugs Comet and Echo (both United Kingdom) and the tender HMS Sprightly (Royal Navy).
Sphynx	United Kingdom	The ship ran aground on the Holmes Sand, in the North Sea off the coast of Suffolk. She was on a voyage from Sunderland, County Durham to Beyrout, Ottoman Syria. She was refloated and taken in to Lowestoft, Suffolk in a leaky condition.

== 10 January ==
List of shipwrecks: 10 January 1857
Ship	State	Description
Albertine	France	The ship was driven ashore and wrecked near Dungeness, Kent, United Kingdom. Her crew were rescued. She was on a voyage from Bordeaux, Gironde, to Dunkirk, Nord. Albertine was refloated in late January and towed in to Rye, Sussex, United Kingdom for repairs.
Emily Wyatt	United Kingdom	The barque was driven ashore at Bray, County Wicklow. She was on a voyage from Liverpool, Lancashire, to Pará, Brazil. She was refloated the next day and towed in to Kingstown, County Dublin.
Endeavour	United Kingdom	The brig was driven ashore and sank at Havre de Grâce, Seine-Inférieure, France. Her crew were rescued by the schooner Céline Louise (France). Endeavour was on a voyage from Sunderland, County Durham to Havre de Grâce.
Gave	France	The ship foundered off Saundersfoot, Pembrokeshire, United Kingdom. Her crew were rescued. She was on a voyage from Bayonne, Basses-Pyrénées to Llanelly, Glamorgan, United Kingdom.
Hippolite and Maria	France	The ship was driven ashore and wrecked near "Comel Mawr", Glamorgan. Her crew were rescued. She was on a voyage from Bayonne to Swansea, Glamorgan.
James Buchanan	United Kingdom	The ship was driven ashore and wrecked at Dungarvan, County Waterford. She was on a voyage from Liverpool, Lancashire, to Mobile, Alabama and/or New Orleans, Louisiana, United States.
John	United Kingdom	The barque was wrecked at the mouth of the Gironde. Her crew were rescued. She was on a voyage from Bordeaux, Gironde, to Cardiff, Glamorgan.
Lord Ashburton	United Kingdom	The ship was wrecked on Grand Manan, New Brunswick, British North America with the loss of all but eight of her crew. She was on a voyage from Toulon, Var, France to Saint John, New Brunswick.
Roderick Dhu	United States	The ship was destroyed by fire at Stavanger, Norway. She was on a voyage from New York to Copenhagen, Denmark.
Thetis	United Kingdom	The barque was abandoned in the Atlantic Ocean (31°12′N 62°30′W). Sixteen crew were rescued by the full-rigged ship Hamilton (United States). Thetis was on a voyage from "Patook", British Honduras to London.

== 11 January ==
List of shipwrecks: 11 January 1857
Ship	State	Description
Abœlino	United Kingdom	The ship struck a sunken wreck off the Barrel Rock, United States. She was on a voyage from Boston, Massachusetts, United States to London. She put in to New York, United States in a leaky condition.
Anne	(United Kingdom of Great Britain and Ireland) Jersey	The smack was driven ashore at Padstow, Cornwall with the loss of all hands.
Briton	United Kingdom	The steamship foundered in the Atlantic Ocean off Ouessant, Finistère, France (48°16′N 6°30′W). Her twenty crew were rescued by the schooner Wave Queen ( (United Kingdom of Great Britain and Ireland) Jersey). Briton was on a voyage from London to Seville, Spain.
Deux Matildes	France	The brig was wrecked near Camaret-sur-Mer, Finistère. She was on a voyage from Odesa to Rouen, Seine-Inférieure.
E. D. T., or E. F. F.	United Kingdom	The barque was driven ashore at St. Mawes, Cornwall.
Elizabeth	United Kingdom	The ship sank in the English Channel 20 nautical miles (37 km) south south east of The Lizard, Cornwall. Her crew were rescued by the schooner Celine Luine (France). Elizabeth was on a voyage from Alexandria, Egypt, to Falmouth, Cornwall or Queenstown, County Cork.
Gardina	Portugal	The brig was driven ashore at St. Mawes.
Hansa	Lübeck	The barque was driven ashore at St. Mawes.
Harrison	United Kingdom	The brig was driven ashore at St. Mawes.
Johanna	United Kingdom	The schooner was driven ashore in Mother Ivey's Bay, near Trevose Head, Cornwall.
Mark To	Norway	The barque was driven ashore at St. Mawes.
Mary and Elizabeth	United States	The barque was driven ashore at St. Mawes.
Princess Alice	United Kingdom	The ship was driven ashore at St. Mawes.
Robert Hay	United Kingdom	The ship was driven ashore at St. Mawes.
Schiedam	Netherlands	The steamship was driven ashore near Vlaardingen, South Holland. She was on a voyage from London to Rotterdam, South Holland.
Sophia	(United Kingdom of Great Britain and Ireland) Jersey	The schooner was driven ashore in Mother Ivey's Bay with the loss of all hands.
Tourtourelle	France	The brig was driven ashore and wrecked at Camaret-sur-Mer. She was on a voyage from Paimbœuf, Finistère, to Cardiff, Glamorgan, United Kingdom.
True Briton	United Kingdom	The ship foundered off Ouessant, Finistère. Her crew were rescued. She was on a voyage from London to Seville, Spain.
Tucker	United Kingdom	The schooner was wrecked 3 nautical miles (5.6 km) from Ouistreham, Calvados, France. Her crew were rescued.

== 12 January ==
List of shipwrecks: 12 January 1857
Ship	State	Description
Alexandre	France	The barque was driven ashore and wrecked at Gibraltar. She was on a voyage from Marseille, Bouches-du-Rhône to Bordeaux, Gironde.
Alpha	United Kingdom	The ship was driven ashore at Trevose Head, Cornwall with the loss of all four or five crew. She was on a voyage from Bristol, Gloucestershire, to Seville, Spain.
Alpha	United Kingdom	The barque was driven ashore and damaged at Gibraltar.
Asia	Trieste	The steamship was driven ashore at Valona, Austrian Empire. She was abandoned the next day; all passengers and crew were rescued. Asia was on a voyage from Trieste to Constantinople, Ottoman Empire.
Eliza Harriet	United Kingdom	The ship sprang a leak and was abandoned in the Atlantic Ocean 40 nautical miles (74 km) south of the Isles of Scilly. Her crew were rescued by Providence (Portugal). Eliza Harriet was on a voyage from Cardiff, Glamorgan, to Cádiz, Spain.
Eliza Maria	United Kingdom	The brig was driven ashore at Gibraltar.
Lizzie J. Nichols	United States	The barque was driven ashore and wrecked near A Coruña, Spain. She was on a voyage from New York to A Coruña.
Nazarine	United Kingdom	The brigantine was driven ashore at Gibraltar. She was on a voyage from New York to Gibraltar.
Polly	United Kingdom	The barque was driven ashore at Barber's Point, in the Dardanelles and was wrecked. Her crew were rescued. She was on a voyage from Cardiff, Glamorgan, to Constantinople.
Potentate	United Kingdom	The ship ran aground on the Kentish Knock. She was on a voyage from South Shields, County Durham, to Genoa, Kingdom of Sardinia. She was refloated and resumed her voyage.
Queen	United Kingdom	The steamship was driven ashore and wrecked near Viana do Castelo, Portugal. She was on a voyage from Lisbon, Portugal, to London.

== 13 January ==
List of shipwrecks: 13 January 1857
Ship	State	Description
Bengal	United Kingdom	The schooner was in collision with the brig Agnes (United Kingdom) and foundered in the Bristol Channel off the Mumbles, Glamorgan.
Enigheden	Denmark	The schooner was abandoned in the Dogger Bank with the loss of all but two of her crew. Survivors were rescued by Thetis (Netherlands). Enigheden was on a voyage from Stege to London, United Kingdom.
Gesina	Kingdom of Hanover	The ship ran aground on the Pilsumer Watt, in the North Sea and was abandoned. She was on a voyage from Emden to London, United Kingdom.
Impetuous	United Kingdom	The schooner was driven ashore and wrecked at "Torrero", Portugal with the loss of five of her seven crew. The wreck was plundered by the local inhabitants. She was on a voyage from Cardiff, Glamorgan, to Seville, Spain.
Kilby	United States	The barque was wrecked on the Goodwin Sands, Kent, United Kingdom. Her crew were rescued. She was on a voyage from South Shields, County Durham, United Kingdom to Alexandria, Egypt.
Margaretta	United Kingdom	The ship was abandoned in the Atlantic Ocean. Her crew were rescued by F. S. Means (United States). Margaretta was on a voyage from South Shields to New York, United States.
Polly	United Kingdom	The ship was driven ashore at Barber's Point, in the Dardanelles. She was on a voyage from Cardiff to Constantinople, Ottoman Empire. She was consequently condemned.
Theda	Kingdom of Hanover	The ship ran aground on the Hamburg Sand, in the North Sea. She was on a voyage from Norden to Hull, Yorkshire, United Kingdom.
Tyne	United Kingdom	The paddle steamer ran aground in Chapman's cove, 5 nautical miles (9.3 km) west of St Albans Head, Dorset. All on board were rescued. She was on a voyage from Rio de Janeiro, Brazil, to London. HMS Devastation (Royal Navy), the tug Aid (United Kingdom) and four other tugs assisted in the salvage operation. Tyne was refloated in mid-March and towed into Southampton, Hampshire. Subsequently repaired and returned to service.
Victory	United Kingdom	The ship departed from the Sand Heads, India for Liverpool, Lancashire. No further trace, presumed foundered with the loss of all hands.

== 14 January ==
List of shipwrecks: 14 January 1857
Ship	State	Description
Ærial	United Kingdom	The ship was towed in to Whitby, Yorkshire in a derelict condition.
Broomielaw	United Kingdom	The ship ran aground at Dundalk, County Louth. She was on a voyage from the Clyde to Dundalk. She was refloated on 18 January.
Fides	Sweden	The brig ran aground on the Longsand, in the North Sea off the coast of Essex, United Kingdom. She became a wreck the next day. Her fourteen crew survived. She was on a voyage from Hartlepool, County Durham, United Kingdom to Algiers, Algeria. The wreck subsequently floated off, and came ashore at Oostduinkerk, West Flanders, Belgium before 17 February.
Hebe	United Kingdom	The ship ran aground on the Little Burbo Bank, in Liverpool Bay. She was on a voyage from Liverpool, Lancashire, to Cádiz, Spain, and Gibraltar. She was refloated and put back to Liverpool.
LXVII	Trieste	The steamship was driven ashore and damaged at "Dalla". She was on a voyage from London, United Kingdom, to Trieste She was refloated.

== 15 January ==
List of shipwrecks: 15 January 1857
Ship	State	Description
Comet	United Kingdom	The waterlogged schooner was driven ashore at Figueira da Foz, Portugal.
Defiance	(United Kingdom of Great Britain and Ireland) Isle of Man	The smack was wrecked on Lady Isle, in the Firth of Clyde. Her crew were rescued.
Elise Marie	United Kingdom	The ship was driven ashore at Gibraltar. She was on a voyage from Cette, Hérault, to Brest, Finistère.
Ida	United Kingdom	The brig was driven ashore and wrecked at Port Willunga, South Australia.
Luna	Kingdom of Hanover	The ship ran aground on the Shipwash Sand, in the North Sea off the coast of Suffolk, United Kingdom. She was on a voyage from Emden to London, United Kingdom. She was refloated and assisted in to Harwich, Essex, United Kingdom in a leaky condition.
Margaret	United Kingdom	The ship was driven ashore at Horn Head, County Donegal. She was on a voyage from Liverpool, Lancashire, to Dunfanaghy, County Donegal.
Morwenna	United Kingdom	The ship was driven against the pier at Brixham, Devon. She was on a voyage from Havre de Grâce, Seine-Inférieure, France to Liverpool.
Viestace	Spain	The brig was wrecked on the Longsand, in the North Sea off the coast of Essex, United Kingdom. Her crew were rescued by the smack New Gipsy (United Kingdom).

== 16 January ==
List of shipwrecks: 16 January 1857
Ship	State	Description
Anita	United Kingdom	The ship was wrecked at Tarifa, Spain. Her crew were rescued. She was on a voyage from London to Málaga, Spain.
Escape	United Kingdom	The brig ran aground at Weymouth, Dorset. She was refloated.
George and Mary	United Kingdom	The brig was driven ashore at Redcar, Yorkshire. She was refloated and resumed her voyage.
Isabel	United Kingdom	The ship ran aground on the Hook Sand, in the English Channel off the coast of Dorset. She was on a voyage from Rouen, Seine-Inférieure, France to Liverpool, Lancashire. She was refloated and resumed her voyage.
Rob the Ranter	United Kingdom	The schooner was driven ashore at the mouth of the River Moy. She was on a voyage from Sligo to Liverpool.
Shark	(United Kingdom of Great Britain and Ireland) British North America	The ship ran aground on the Hook Sand. She was refloated and taken in to Poole, Dorset.

== 17 January ==
List of shipwrecks: 17 January 1857
Ship	State	Description
HMS Devastation	Royal Navy	The Driver-class sloop ran aground in the Solent. She was refloated.
Endeavour	(United Kingdom of Great Britain and Ireland) New Zealand	The schooner ran aground on a sandspit at the mouth of the Clutha River, New Zealand, and was wrecked.
Herald	United Kingdom	The brig was driven ashore near Holmes Hole, Massachusetts, United States. She was refloated on 16 February.
Norway	United Kingdom	The ship ran aground at the mouth of the River Tyne. She was refloated the next day.
Robert Watson	United Kingdom	The barque ran aground on the Longsand, in the North Sea off the coast of Essex. She was refloated the next day and towed in to Harwich, Essex.

== 18 January ==
List of shipwrecks: 18 January 1857
Ship	State	Description
Clyde Vale	United Kingdom	The smack struck the Sillicar Rocks, on the cost of Berwickshire. She was on a voyage from Hull, Yorkshire, to Dundee, Forfarshire. She was refloated and taken in to Berwick upon Tweed, Northumberland for repairs.
Earl of Durham	United Kingdom	The steamship ran aground at the mouth of the River Tyne. She was refloated and resumed her voyage.
Mathilde	France	The brig was wrecked on Menorca, Spain, with the loss of ten of her eleven crew. She was on a voyage from Marseille, Bouches-du-Rhône to Senegal.
New York	United States	The ship was driven ashore and wrecked at Barnegat, New Jersey. She was on a voyage from Liverpool, Lancashire, United Kingdom to New York.
Orissa	United States	The ship was driven ashore and wrecked at Cohasset, Massachusetts with the loss of four of her crew. She was on a voyage from Calcutta, India, to Boston, Massachusetts.
Paolo	Flag unknown	The ship was driven ashore at Port-Blanc, Côtes du Nord, France. Her crew were rescued. She was on a voyage from Cardiff, Glamorgan, United Kingdom to Bahia, Brazil.
Sincerity	United Kingdom	The ship ran aground on the Nash Sands, in the Bristol Channel off the coast of Glamorgan, and sank. Her crew were rescued. She was on a voyage from Par, Cornwall, to Gloucester.
Tedesco	United States	The ship was driven ashore at Swampscott, Massachusetts, with the loss of all hands. She was on a voyage from Cádiz, Spain, to Boston, Massachusetts.
Triune	United Kingdom	The brig ran aground at the mouth of the River Tyne.

== 19 January ==
List of shipwrecks: 19 January 1857
Ship	State	Description
Arthur Anderson	United Kingdom	The sloop was driven ashore on Bressay, Shetland Islands and sank. She was later refloated.
Crown	United Kingdom	The ship was wrecked on the Carysfort Reef. She was on a voyage from New Orleans, Louisiana, United States to Liverpool, Lancashire.
Haltwhistle	United Kingdom	The barque ran aground off Callantsoog, North Holland, Netherlands, and was wrecked with some loss of life. She was on a voyage from Batavia, Netherlands East Indies, to Bremen.
Henry H. Crapo	United States	The whaler, a barque, capsized in a squall in the Indian Ocean (32°30′S 32°00′E) with the loss of all but two of her 22 crew. Survivors were rescued by the steamship England (United Kingdom). Henry H. Crapo was on a voyage from St. Augustin Bay, Madagascar to Dartmouth, Massachusetts.
Lord Ashburton	(United Kingdom) British North America	During a voyage from Toulon, France, to St. John, New Brunswick, the 155-foot (47 m), 1,009-gross register ton barque was blown onto rocks during a winter storm at Eel Brook Cove, near Ashburton Head, on Grand Manan, New Brunswick, and wrecked at 44°47.668′N 066°46.229′W. Her crew of 29 was swept overboard, and only eight survived and reached shore.
Œron	United Kingdom	The ship ran aground on The Skerries, off Anglesey. She was on a voyage from Liverpool, Lancashire, to London. She was refloated and put back to Liverpool in a leaky condition.
Thomas Fielden	United Kingdom	The ship ran aground in the Thanlwin and became severely hogged. She was on a voyage from Moulmein, Burma, to a British port.

== 20 January ==
List of shipwrecks: 20 January 1857
Ship	State	Description
Alchymist	United Kingdom	The brig was driven ashore at Portrush, County Antrim. She was on a voyage from Alexandria, Egypt, to Londonderry.
Dan Glaister	United Kingdom	The ship was driven ashore 2 nautical miles (3.7 km) north of Montrose, Forfarshire Her crew were rescued. She was refloated on 25 January.
Daylesford	United Kingdom	The ship was wrecked on Saona Island, Dominican Republic. Her crew were rescued. She was on a voyage from San Juan, Puerto Rico to Acapulco, Mexico.
Eclipse	United Kingdom	The schooner was wrecked at Groudle, Isle of Man. Her crew were rescued. She was on a voyage from Dublin to Whitehaven, Cumberland.
Franklin	United Kingdom	The barque abandoned in the North Sea. Her crew were rescued by the pilot boat No. 1 (Netherlands). Franklinwas taken in to Rotterdam, South Holland in a derelict condition.
Isla	United Kingdom	The barque was driven ashore and sank at Nieuwport, West Flanders, Belgium. She was on a voyage from Seaham, County Durham, to Nieuwpoort.
Jane	United Kingdom	The ship ran aground on the West Rocks, off Harwich, Essex. She was on a voyage from South Shields, County Durham, to London.refloated and taken in to Harwich in a leaky condition.
John Thomas Carr	United Kingdom	The brig was abandoned in the Mediterranean Sea 100 nautical miles (190 km) east north east of Malta. Her crew were rescued by the schooner Jules (France). John Thomas Carr was on a voyage from Constantinople, Ottoman Empire, to a British port.
Laurel	United Kingdom	The ship was driven ashore on Barra, Outer Hebrides.
Midlothian	United Kingdom	The ship was abandoned off Madeira. Her crew survived. She was on a voyage from Cardiff, Glamorgan, to Caldera, Chile.
Reform	United Kingdom	The ship sank 2 nautical miles (3.7 km) north of South Shields, County Durham with the loss of all hands.
Reussite	France	The ship was driven ashore at Great Yarmouth, Norfolk, United Kingdom. She was on a voyage from Marseille, Bouches-du-Rhône to Great Yarmouth. She sank on 22 January. Reussite was refloated on 20 February and taken in to Great Yarmouth.
Rising Sun	United Kingdom	The schooner was driven ashore and wrecked near the Southerness Lighthouse, Kirkcudbrightshire. Her crew were rescued. She was on a voyage from Belfast, County Antrim, to Maryport, Cumberland.
Robert and Jane	United Kingdom	The sloop was wrecked at Berwick upon Tweed, Northumberland. Her crew were rescued. She was on a voyage from Leven, Fife, to Newcastle upon Tyne, Northumberland. The wreck floated off and was towed in to Lindisfarne, Northumberland on 23 January.
Roussele	France	The ship was driven ashore at Great Yarmouth, Norfolk, United Kingdom.
Waterwitch	(United Kingdom of Great Britain and Ireland) New South Wales	The schooner was wrecked on "Uca Island", New Hebrides. Some of her crew were murdered by the local inhabitants.
Wilhelmina	Sweden	The schooner was in collision with the brig Galathea (Denmark) and sank off Inchcape, Fife, United Kingdom. Her crew were rescued.

== 21 January ==
List of shipwrecks: 21 January 1857
Ship	State	Description
Irene	United Kingdom	The smack was in collision with the steamship Arcadia (United Kingdom and sank off The Lizard, Cornwall with the loss of two of her crew. Survivors were rescued by Arcadia. Irene was on a voyage from Belfast, County Antrim, to Plymouth, Devon.
Linton	United Kingdom	The ship was driven ashore near Blakeney, Norfolk. She was on a voyage from Sunderland, County Durham to London. She was refloated.
Martha Alida	Prussia	The ship was driven ashore at Withernsea, Yorkshire, United Kingdom. She was on a voyage from Königsberg to King's Lynn, Norfolk, United Kingdom. She was refloated on 28 March and taken in to Hull, Yorkshire.

== 22 January ==
List of shipwrecks: 22 January 1857
Ship	State	Description
Cassiterides	United Kingdom	The ship ran aground in the Isles of Scilly. She was on a voyage from Arica, Chile, to Liverpool, Lancashire. She was refloated and found to be leaky.
Eliza	United Kingdom	The ship was driven onto the Devil's Bank, in the River Mersey. She was on a voyage from Liverpool, Lancashire, to Calcutta, India. She was refloated the next day.
Friends of Eliza	United Kingdom	The ship was driven ashore at Kessingland, Suffolk. She was on a voyage from Hartlepool, County Durham, to Rochester, Kent.
Marion	United Kingdom	The brig was driven against the breakwater at San Sebastián, Spain, and was wrecked.
Queen	United Kingdom	The steamship collided with the steamship Excelsior in the Moray Firth off Chanonry Point, Ross-shire and ran aground.
Severus	United Kingdom	The barque capsized at Sunderland, County Durham.
Splash	United Kingdom	The ship was driven ashore and wrecked near Ilfracombe, Devon.

== 23 January ==
List of shipwrecks: 23 January 1857
Ship	State	Description
Ann	United Kingdom	The ship was driven ashore in the River Dee. She was on a voyage from Barmouth, Merionethshire, to Mostyn, Flintshire. She was refloated but consequently had to be beached between the Point of Ayr, Cheshire and Mostyn.
Confederation	United States	The ship was driven ashore in the Victoria Channel. She floated off but was driven ashore and wrecked. Three of her crew were reported missing. Confederation was on a voyage from Philadelphia, Pennsylvania, to Liverpool, Lancashire, United Kingdom.
Friends	United Kingdom	The schooner was wrecked in the Farne Islands, Northumberland. Her crew were rescued. She was on a voyage from Dundee, Forfarshire, to London.
Gnome	United Kingdom	The steamship ran aground at Stromness, Orkney Islands. She was on a voyage from Grangemouth, Stirlingshire, to the Clyde.
Grace and James	United Kingdom	The schooner was driven ashore at Great Yarmouth, Norfolk. She was on a voyage from a port in Caithness to London. She was refloated on 2 February and taken in to Great Yarmouth.
James	United Kingdom	The schooner was driven ashore at Lydd, Kent.
James	United Kingdom	The schooner was driven ashore at Great Yarmouth. She was on a voyage from a port in Caithness to London.
Japhet	France	The ship was driven ashore 6 nautical miles (11 km) east of Calais. Her crew were rescued. She was on a voyage from Calais to Abbeville, Somme. She was refloated on 25 January and taken in to Calais.
Johanna	Grand Duchy of Mecklenburg-Schwerin	The schooner was wrecked on the Jadder, in the North Sea. She was on a voyage from Newcastle upon Tyne, Northumberland, United Kingdom to Bergen, Norway.
Little Henry	United Kingdom	The schooner was driven ashore at Whitby, Yorkshire.
Louise	United Kingdom	The ship departed from Colombo, Ceylon for Bordeaux, Gironde. No further trace, presumed foundered with the loss of all hands.
Mary Ann	United Kingdom	The ship ran aground off Great Yarmouth. She was on a voyage from Plymouth, Devon, to Hull, Yorkshire.
Osprey	United Kingdom	The ship was driven ashore at Liverpool. She was on a voyage from Liverpool to Africa. she was refloated and taken back to Liverpool.
Ritsons	United Kingdom	The brig was driven ashore and severely damaged at Great Yarmouth. She was refloated.
Victory	United Kingdom	The barque was driven ashore and damaged at Great Yarmouth. She was refloated.
Warratah	United Kingdom	The barque was abandoned in the Atlantic Ocean with the loss of a one of her seven crew. Survivors were rescued by Perseverance ( (United Kingdom of Great Britain and Ireland) British North America). Warratah was on a voyage from Savannah, Georgia, United States to Liverpool, Lancashire.

== 24 January ==
List of shipwrecks: 24 January 1857
Ship	State	Description
Adam White	United Kingdom	The ship was damaged by ice in the North Sea. She was on a voyage from Hamburg to Plymouth, Devon. She was towed in to Glückstadt for repairs.
Amazon	Denmark	The ship ran aground off "Kjansjoand" and was wrecked. She was on a voyage from Hull, Yorkshire, United Kingdom to Korsør.
Balaklava	United Kingdom	The steamship ran aground at Queenstown, County Cork. She was on a voyage from Woolwich, Kent, to Queenstown.
Elise	France	The schooner collided with the barque Agenoria (United Kingdom) and sank off Cape de Gatt, Spain, with the loss of two of her six crew. Survivors were rescued by Agenoria.
John and Jane	United Kingdom	The sloop ran aground at Sunderland, County Durham. She was on a voyage from Sunderland to Harwich, Essex. She was refloated and resumed her voyage, but consequently put in to Bridlington, Yorkshire in a severely leaky condition.
Nautilus	United Kingdom	The ship was driven ashore at Bridlington, Yorkshire. She was on a voyage from London to Sunderland.
Niels Gylding	Flag unknown	The ship was in collision with Wynaud (United Kingdom) and was abandoned. Her crew were rescued by Wynaud
Rover's Bride	(United Kingdom of Great Britain and Ireland) British North America	The full-rigged ship was discovered waterlogged and abandoned in the Atlantic Ocean (38°39′N 41°52′W) by Atrato (United Kingdom.
Scotsman	Malta	The brig was wrecked at Zakynthos, Greece. She was on a voyage from Mytilene, Greece, to Livorno, Grand Duchy of Tuscany.
South Esk	United Kingdom	The ship was driven ashore and wrecked at Montrose, Forfarshire. She was on a voyage from Gothenburg, Sweden, to Montrose.

== 25 January ==
List of shipwrecks: 25 January 1857
Ship	State	Description
Ann	United Kingdom	The ship ran aground on the Half-Ebb Rock, off Harwich, Essex. She was on a voyage from South Shields, County Durham, to Dunkirk, Nord, France. She was refloated the next day and taken in to Harwich.
Fowler	United Kingdom	The ship was driven ashore in the Bay of Étaples. She was on a voyage from Dieppe, Seine-Inférieure, France to West Hartlepool, County Durham. She was refloated on 27 January and taken in to Boulogne, Pas-de-Calais, France.
Henry Taylor	United Kingdom	The ship was driven ashore and damaged at Bridlington, Yorkshire. She was on a voyage from London to Blyth, Northumberland. She was refloated the next day and taken in to Bridlington.
Hilda	Bremen	The barque was wrecked at the mouth of the Tagus. Her crew survived. she was on a voyage from New York to Bremen.
Jane	United Kingdom	The ship was abandoned at sea. Her crew were rescued by James Brown (United Kingdom). Jane was on a voyage from Truro, Cornwall, to Newport, Monmouthshire.
Jenny Lind	United States	The steamship was sunk at Savannah, Georgia when the full-rigged ship Pembroke (United Kingdom heeled over against her.
Peache	United Kingdom	The ship capsized in the English Channel off Portland Bill, Dorset. Her crew were rescued. She was on a voyage from Poole to Bridport.
Pilot	Norway	The schooner was wrecked at the mouth of the Adour. Her crew were rescued. She was on a voyage from Liverpool, Lancashire, United Kingdom to Bayonne, Basses-Pyrénées.
Sabrina	United Kingdom	The barque was driven ashore at Fredrikshavn, Denmark.
Speculator	United Kingdom	The sloop was driven ashore on the Crow Toe and sank with the loss of her captain. She was on a voyage from Saundersfoot to Pembroke Dock, Pembrokeshire.
Swallow	United Kingdom	The ship was driven ashore at Bridlington. She was on a voyage from Poole to Hartlepool. She was dismantled in situ.

== 26 January ==
List of shipwrecks: 26 January 1857
Ship	State	Description
Albert	United Kingdom	The ship ran aground on the Skinner Rocks, off Anglesey. She was on a voyage from Liverpool, Lancashire, to Dublin. She was refloated and resumed her voyage.
Ann	United Kingdom	The ship was driven ashore at Harwich, Essex.
Brian Boru	United Kingdom	The schooner ran aground on the Hollywood Bank, in the Irish Sea off the coast of County Antrim.
Crimea	United Kingdom	The schooner was driven ashore at The Magazines, Lancashire in a capsized condition.
Emily	United States	The schooner was abandoned in the Atlantic Ocean. Her crew were rescued by Ambassador (United Kingdom). Emily was on a voyage from Charleston, South Carolina to Beaufort, North Carolina.
Généreuse	France	The ship ran aground on the Barnard Sand, in the North Sea off the coast of Suffolk, United Kingdom. She was refloated and taken in to Lowestoft, Suffolk in a leaky condition.
Marion	United Kingdom	The ship was driven ashore in Rhos Bay. She was on a voyage from Liverpool, Lancashire, to Antigua. She was refloated on 28 January and towed back to Liverpool.
Ralph Thompson	United Kingdom	The ship was abandoned in the Atlantic Ocean 200 nautical miles (370 km) north west of Lisbon, Portugal. Her crew were rescued. She was on a voyage from Musquash, New Brunswick, British North America to South Shields, County Durham.
Sir Colin Campbell	United Kingdom	The barque sprang a leak and was abandoned in the Indian Ocean. Her crew were rescued by Walpole (United Kingdom).
Sophia	United Kingdom	The sloop collided with Mentor (United Kingdom) and sank at Great Yarmouth, Norfolk. Her crew were rescued. She was on a voyage from London to King's Lynn, Norfolk.
Telegraph	United States	The extreme clipper caught fire at Savannah, Georgia and was scuttled. Subsequently refloated, repaired and returned to service as Henry Brigham.

== 27 January ==
List of shipwrecks: 27 January 1857
Ship	State	Description
Azoff	United Kingdom	The brig was wrecked 7 nautical miles (13 km) east of Halifax, Nova Scotia, British North America. Her crew were rescued. She was on a voyage from Newcastle upon Tyne, Northumberland, to Boston, Massachusetts.
Royal Adelaide	United Kingdom	The steamship ran aground at Padstow, Cornwall. She was on a voyage from Cádiz, Spain, to Cardiff, Glamorgan.
St. Joseph	France	The ship struck the Linion Rocks, off Le Conquet, Finistère and sank. Her crew were rescued. She was on a voyage from Cardiff to Nantes, Loire-Inférieure.
William and Thomas	United Kingdom	The ship collided with the schooner Elizabeth Ann (United Kingdom) and sank off Penzance, Cornwall. Her crew were rescued by Elizabeth Ann.

== 28 January ==
List of shipwrecks: 28 January 1857
Ship	State	Description
Ebenezer	United Kingdom	The brig ran aground on the Owers Sandbank, in the English Channel off the coast of Sussex. She was refloated and taken in to Portsmouth, Hampshire.
Gwydwr Castle	United Kingdom	The ship struck the breakwater and sank at Holyhead, Anglesey. Her crew were rescued. She was on a voyage from Newry, County Antrim, to Preston, Lancashire. Gwydwr Castle was refloated on 30 January and beached, but was then wrecked. She was again refloated on 2 February.
Hero	United Kingdom	The ship sank in the Isles of Scilly. She was on a voyage from Penryn, Cornwall, to the Isles of Scilly.
Honorine	France	The ship foundered. Four crew were rescued by Emilie Jenkins (United Kingdom). Honorine was on a voyage from Ramsgate, Kent, United Kingdom to Dieppe, Seine-Inférieure.
Java	United Kingdom	The ship ran aground on the Pluckington Bank, in the Irish Sea off the coast of Lancashire. She was on a voyage from Liverpool, Lancashire, to Gibraltar. She was refloated and resumed her voyage.
Margaret	United Kingdom	The ship ran aground on the Dutchman's Bank. She was on a voyage from Queenstown, County Cork to Liverpool. She was refloated and towed in to Liverpool.
Shanghai	United Kingdom	The barque was driven onto reefs off Grand River, Mauritius after cables parted in bad weather. She was on a voyage from the Swan River Colony to Mauritius.
Wallasey	United Kingdom	The Mersey Ferry was holed by the anchor of the steamship Fairy (United Kingdom) in the River Mersey. Her passengers were taken off by the Mersey Ferry Tiger (United Kingdom). Wallasey was on a voyage from Egremont, Cheshire, to Liverpool. She was taken in to the Prince's Dock, Liverpool, where she sank.

== 29 January ==
List of shipwrecks: 29 January 1857
Ship	State	Description
Prince George	United Kingdom	The barque ran aground at Point William, Fernando Po, Equatorial Guinea. She was on a voyage from Cardiff, Glamorgan, to Fernando Po.
St. Andrew	United Kingdom	The steamship was driven ashore and wrecked at "Cape Ziard", near Latakia, Ottoman Syria. She was on a voyage from Liverpool to Beyrout, Ottoman Syria Alexandretta Ottoman Empire, and Alexandria, Egypt Eyalet.

== 30 January ==
List of shipwrecks: 30 January 1857
Ship	State	Description
Anais	France	The ship was wrecked at "Tonglae" following a passengers' revolt. Some of her crew were murdered. She was on a voyage from Swatow, China, to Havana, Cuba.
Emma Eliza	United Kingdom	The ship ran aground on the Goodwin Sands, Kent. She was on a voyage from Sunderland, County Durham to "Villaricos". She was refloated and assisted in to Ramsgate, Kent.
Little Belt	United Kingdom	The ship was driven ashore at Portland, Dorset with the loss of a crew member. She was on a voyage from Poole to Bridport. She was towed in to Weymouth, Dorset in early February.
Queen	United Kingdom	The ship was driven ashore at the mouth of the Gourock Burn. She was refloated.

== 31 January ==
List of shipwrecks: 31 January 1857
Ship	State	Description
Earl of Leicester	United Kingdom	The ship ran aground on the Barnard Sand, in the North Sea off the coast of Suffolk. She was refloated and put in to Great Yarmouth, Norfolk in a leaky condition.
John Miller	United Kingdom	The ship was wrecked south of Savanilla, Republic of New Granada. Her crew were rescued. She was on a voyage from Newry, County Antrim, to Savanilla.
Lamb	United Kingdom	The brigantine was driven ashore at Dunwich, Suffolk. She was on a voyage from Ramsgate, Kent, to Sunderland, County Durham. She was refloated and put in to Lowestoft, Suffolk.
Oline Cecilie	Denmark	The ship was driven ashore on Fanø. She was on a voyage from Newcastle upon Tyne, Northumberland, United Kingdom to Assens.
Solon	France	The lugger was driven ashore at Dungeness, Kent with the loss of five of her six crew. She was on a voyage from Saint-Valery-en-Caux, Seine-Inférieure to Dunkirk, Nord.
Taniscot	United Kingdom	The ship was wrecked at Nassau, Bahamas. She was on a voyage from New Orleans, Louisiana, United States to Liverpool, Lancashire.

== Unknown date ==
List of shipwrecks: Unknown date in January 1857
Ship	State	Description
Alexander	(Russian Empire) Grand Duchy of Finland	The ship was in collision with the steamship Victoria (United Kingdom) and was reported to have been sunk between 14 and 19 January. Her crew were rescued by Victoria. Alexander was on a voyage from Hull, Yorkshire, United Kingdom to Seville, Spain. She later came ashore at Dover, Kent, United Kingdom in a capsized condition.
Angiolina	Grand Duchy of Tuscany	The brig foundered off Catania, Sicily before 22 January.
Atlas	United Kingdom	The ship was wrecked near Lillesand, Norway before 16 January. She was on a voyage from Sundsvall, Sweden to London.
Carlo III	Royal Sicilian Navy	The steamship was destroyed by a boiler explosion and sank in the Mediterranean Sea before 8 January with the loss of more than 50 of the 100 people on board. Survivors were rescued by HMS Malacca (Royal Navy)
Caroline R. Ferrar	(United Kingdom of Great Britain and Ireland) Jersey	The cutter departed from Jersey for Southampton, Hampshire in late January. No further trace, presumed foundered in the English Channel with the loss of all hands.
Catherine	Norway	The brig was wrecked on the Panela Rock, off Montevideo, Uruguay. Her crew were rescued.
Cosmo	United Kingdom	The ship ran aground on the Pacific Reef, off the coast of Cuba before 25 January.
Curonea	United Kingdom	The ship was holed by ice and sank in Riga Bay. Her crew were rescued. She was on a voyage from Riga, Russia, to London.
David	United Kingdom	The ship was lost off the coast of Norway before 8 January with some loss of life. She was on a voyage from Königsberg, Prussia, to Aberdeen.
Emily	United States	The barque capsized off Montevideo in a squall. Her crew were rescued.
Enterprise	United Kingdom	The brig collided with the steamship Wearmouth (United Kingdom and was abandoned 12 nautical miles (22 km) east south east of Spurn Point, Yorkshire. Her crew were rescued by Wearmouth.
Fingalton	United Kingdom	The ship was driven ashore in Dundrum Bay. She was on a voyage from Liverpool, Lancashire, to South Shields, County Durham. She was refloated on 31 January and towed in to Belfast, County Antrim.
Golden Racer	United States	The ship was wrecked in the Min River before 30 January. Her crew were rescued. She was on a voyage from Foo Chow Foo to an American port.
Inkerman	United Kingdom	The ship was driven ashore in the Dardanelles. She was later refloated and resumed her voyage.
Ionian	Greece	The steamship ran aground at Ferrol, Spain.
Jason	United Kingdom	The ship was wrecked at Berwick upon Tweed, Northumberland before 6 January.
Jessie	United Kingdom	The brig was wrecked at Beadnell, Northumberland.
Jeune Marie	France	The ship foundered in the English Channel off Guernsey, Channel Islands. She was on a voyage from Sunderland, County Durham, United Kingdom to Bordeaux, Gironde.
Latour d'Auvergne	France	The ship was wrecked at La Tremblade, Charente-Inférieure before 20 January.
Liron	France	The ship was wrecked on the Portuguese coast before 20 January. Her crew were rescued.
Mauritius	United Kingdom	The full-rigged ship was wrecked on Grand Manan. Her crew were rescued. She was on a voyage from Newcastle upon Tyne, Northumberland, to Saint John, New Brunswick.
Marie Eulalie	France	The ship was driven ashore near "Boucaud" before 29 January.
Melanie	France	The ship was driven ashore at "Boncaut", Basses-Pyrénées before 17 January.
Mercury	United Kingdom	The ship was wrecked at Portugal Cove, Newfoundland, British North America. She was on a voyage from Carbonear, Newfoundland, to Liverpool, Lancashire.
Nautilus	United Kingdom	The ship was driven ashore at Bridlington, Yorkshire. She was refloated on 26 January and taken in to Bridlington.
Pilote	Prussia	The ship was driven ashore near "Boucaud" before 29 January.
Regina	Netherlands	The ship was wrecked before 22 January. She was on a voyage from Newcastle upon Tyne, Northumberland to Hong Kong.
Sir Edmund Lyons	United Kingdom	The barque foundered in the Mediterranean Sea (34°15′N 27°10′E) east of Heraklion, Crete. Her thirteen crew were rescued by Maltese (Malta).
Sirene	France	The schooner was wrecked at Saint-Briac-sur-Mer, Ille-et-Vilaine before 20 January. Her crew were rescued.
Triumph	United Kingdom	The ship foundered in the North Sea off the coast of Yorkshire on or before 25 January.
Trude	United Kingdom	The ship was lost near Sulina, Ottoman Empire. She was on a voyage from the Danube to a British port.
Turner	United Kingdom	The Mersey Flat ran aground on the Horse Bank, in the Irish Sea off the coast of Lancashire. Her crew were rescued by the Lytham Lifeboat.
Tweed	United Kingdom	The brig was driven ashore near Dover, Kent in a capsized condition.
Unanimity	United Kingdom	The ship foundered off the coast of County Durham in early January.
Wards	United Kingdom	The brig was driven ashore at "Warren", Northumberland. She was refloated on 9 January and taken in to Lindisfarne, Northumberland.
William Alexander	United Kingdom	The ship was presumed to have foundered in the North Sea between 2 and 8 January with the loss of all hands.
William's Adventure	United Kingdom	The schooner was driven ashore at Worthing, Sussex. She was refloated on 23 January and towed in to Shoreham-by-Sea in a severely damaged condition.
Yoloff	France	The brig was driven ashore at Cape de Fer, Algeria. Her crew were rescued.
