= Missa =

Missa may refer to:

- Mass (liturgy)
- Mass (music), a choral composition that sets liturgical text to music
  - Missa brevis
  - Missa solemnis (explains the term and lists several works)
- Miss A, a Korean girl group
- Missa pro defunctis and Missa defunctorum, alternative names for the Requiem mass
- For the etymological root of missa see Ite missa est
- Missa (EP), a 1997 EP by Dir En Grey

== See also ==
- Mass (disambiguation)
- Missal (disambiguation)
- Ordo missae Order of Mass
