= Cosmonaut (disambiguation) =

A cosmonaut or astronaut is a person trained by a human spaceflight program to command, pilot, or serve as a crew member of a spacecraft.

Cosmonaut may also refer to:

- Cosmonaut (film), a 2009 Italian coming-of-age film
- The Cosmonaut, a 2013 Spanish science fiction film
- Cosmonauts Sea, a sea of the Southern Ocean off Antarctica
- Cosmonaut Glacier, a tributary glacier in the Southern Cross Mountains, Antarctica
- Cosmonaut (album), by Bump of Chicken
- Cosmonaut, a side project of the band Finch

== See also ==
- Cosmonauts Alley, a wide avenue in northern Moscow
- Astronaut (disambiguation)
