= Song of the Mary White =

"Song of the Mary White" is a ballad written in Broadstairs, England in the early 1850s.

It has been suggested that news of the loss of the Irish packet Royal Adelaide with 250 lives, on the sands off Margate on 6 April 1850, prompted Thomas White to present one of his lifeboats to his home town of Broadstairs that summer. The lifeboat saw its first use on 6 March 1851, when the brig Mary White became trapped on the Goodwin Sands during a severe gale blowing from the north. A ballad was written to celebrate the occasion, the "Song of the Mary White".

The lifeboat itself was subsequently named the Mary White in recognition of the strange coincidence of the recurrence of the name White in this story: Thomas and John the lifeboat builders, the name of the brig Mary White, and also the name of its captain, Mr White.

== Lyrics ==
Come all you jolly sailors bold, and landsmen too, attend,
I am inclined to sing in praise of those eight gallant men,
who boldly left their native shore as you shall understand,
to save the lives of those poor souls upon the Goodwin Sand.

Chorus
Britons all, both young and old, think of those jolly sailors bold.

On Thursday, 'twas March the sixth, the wind blew from the land
which drove the fated Mary White upon the Goodwin Sands.
The lifeboat's crew from Broadstairs flew, with hearts so light and gay,
Right gallantly they made the wreck, those precious lives to save.

Chorus

John Crouch, a gallant sailor bold, likewise George Castle too,
George Wales, Richard Crouch, this day, my praise is due to you
Sol Holbourn, Sackett Ansel, John Wales, with great delight
So gallantly did venture off to save the Mary White.

Chorus

Ned Chittingden, 17 your health I drink, I drink with thee,
Times three and for your valour, my brave men, you shall rewarded be.

Chorus

You've done your best, and saved the lives of seven poor souls this day;
May God receive the other three who did get cast away.

Chorus

So to conclude and finish now, my song is at an end,
May God above a blessing give to those eight gallant men!

Chorus
