= Pershing Professionals Badge =

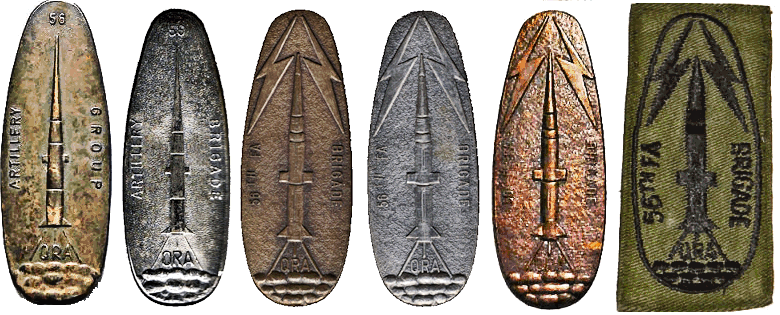
- Type: Badge
- Presented by: 56th Field Artillery Group, United States Army
- Eligibility: Proficiency on the Pershing nuclear missile system
- Status: Discontinued
- First award: 1968
- Final award: 1979

The Pershing Professionals Badge is a local individual award created by the 56th Artillery Group to recognize proficiency on the nuclear Pershing missile system. It was awarded from December 1968 through 1979.

Originally awarded only as bronze, the silver and gold versions of the badge were later developed. Cloth versions of the badge were also available. The badge and patches were locally procured in Schwäbisch Gmünd. The badge was colloquially known as the Pocket Rocket or Pershing Pickle.

The badge went through some design changes:

- The original badge was stamped, and showed 56 Artillery Group and the motto of QRA (Quick, Reliable, Accurate or Quick Reaction Alert).
- The text changed to 56 Artillery Brigade after the September 1970 redesignation.
- After June 1971, the badge changed to reflect the new shoulder sleeve insignia. The text changed to 56th FA Brigade, the lightning bolts from the insignia were added and the background became textured. The badge was now cast instead of stamped.

The 3rd Ordnance Battalion allowed some soldiers to wear the badge for supporting the missile launches performed at Cape Canaveral and elsewhere.

The 3rd Battalion, 9th Field Artillery Regiment was the Pershing training unit at Fort Sill, Oklahoma. In 1976, they developed the similar Field Artillery Missileman's Badge for proficiency. The badge was a red rectangle with a silver missile and was awarded in basic, senior and master levels.

In 1978, the Army began to rescind authorization for local uniforms and awards and the badge was withdrawn in 1979. Remaining badges were generally given as gifts to departing members.

== Bibliography ==
- Emerson, William K. (April 2004). Marksmanship in the U.S. Army: A History of Medals, Shooting Programs, and Training. University of Oklahoma Press. ISBN 978-0806135755.
- 56th Artillery Group Reg 672-3. 56th Artillery Group. 6 December 1968.
