= Missile (disambiguation) =

A missile is a self-propelled guided projectile used as a weapon towards a target.

Missile may also refer to:

== Weapons ==
- Projectile, any thrown object
- Dart (missile)

== Film and television ==
- Missile (film), a 1988 documentary film
- The Missile, a 2024 Finnish-Estonian film
- "Missiles" (Slow Horses), a 2025 television episode

== Music ==
- Missiles (album), a 2008 album by The Dears
- "Missile" a song by IAMX from the 2005 album Kiss + Swallow
- "Missile", a 2016 song by Lartiste
- "Missile", a song by Dorothy from the 2016 album Rockisdead

== Other uses ==
- Missile, a character in the 2010 Nintendo DS video game Ghost Trick: Phantom Detective
- The Missile, nickname of American football player Qadry Ismail

== See also ==
- Missal (disambiguation)
- Mistle thrush, a species of bird
