= Rocketeer =

A rocketeer is a person who uses rockets.

It may also refer to:

== People ==
- A soldier specialized in rocket artillery
  - 1st Rocketeer Corps of Poland, who operated the Congreve rocket
- A person who rides rockets, an astronaut
- A person who operates model rockets
- A person specializing in creating rockets; a rocket scientist

== Entertainment ==
- The Rocketeer (character), a fictional comic book character and media franchise
  - The Rocketeer (film), a 1991 Disney film featuring the character
  - The Rocketeer (soundtrack), 1991 soundtrack album
  - The Rocketeer (NES video game), a 1991 videogame based on the character
  - The Rocketeer (TV series), animated series based on the character
- Rocketeers, comic book characters, see list of Marvel Comics teams and organizations
- "Rocketeer" (song), a 2010 song by Far East Movement from the album Free Wired

== See also ==
- Rocketer, a sailing brig wrecked in 1857; see List of shipwrecks in January 1857
- Rosie the Rocketer, a scout attack plane
- Rosie the Rocketeer, a Boeing spaceflight test dummy
- The Rockyteers, the puppeteer team behind the character Rocky from the 2026 film Project Hail Mary
- Rocket (disambiguation)
- Rocket Man (disambiguation)
- Missileer (disambiguation)
