= Foreness Point =

Headland of Kent, England

Coordinates: 51°23′40″N 1°25′40″E

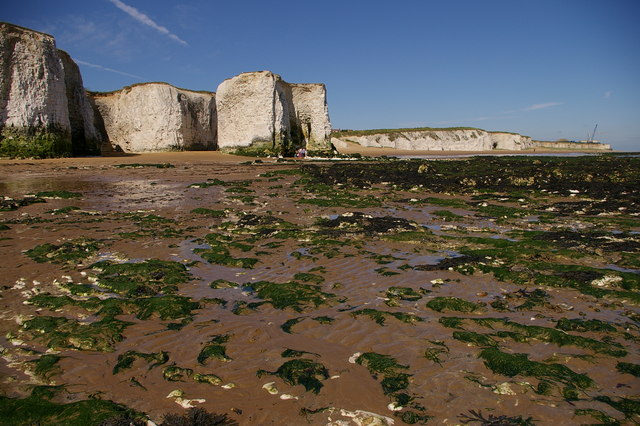
Foreness Point as seen from Botany Bay. Picture taken at low tide.

Foreness Point is a low headland on the coast of Kent in England. It extends a short distance into the entrance of the Thames Estuary, on the north coast of Thanet, between Palm Bay in Cliftonville and Botany Bay in Broadstairs. Off the point there is a reef, exposed at low tide, known as Long Nose Spit, where common periwinkles are collected by the public as a food item. There is a water treatment plant on the headland.

There have been a number of shipwrecks in this location. In 1857 the transatlantic passenger ship Northern Belle was wrecked off the point. In 1907 the Norwegian ship Coronel ran aground: it was later refloated and returned to service. In 1934 the British ship Orchis ran aground, and was also later refloated and returned to service.

During the Second World War there was a Chain Home Low radar station at Foreness.
