= Astronot =

2012 video game

- Developer: Wade McGillis
- Publisher: Wade McGillis
- Platforms: Microsoft Windows, OS X, iOS
- Release: WW: June 12, 2012
- Genres: Platform-adventure, Metroidvania
- Mode: Single-player

Astronot is a 2012 action-adventure platform game created by indie developer Wade McGillis. It is similar to the Metroid series.

== Plot ==
The player character is an astronaut who has crash-landed on an alien planet, and must plunge into its depths in search of parts with which to repair the damaged ship.

== Gameplay ==
Astronot is a side-scrolling game in which the player guides the astronaut through a vast subterranean maze. At the beginning of the game, the astronaut can do little but run, jump, and shoot, but as the player ventures deeper into the planet and acquires items, their abilities will expand; higher jumping, better guns, etc. The player will periodically need to backtrack to previous areas with their new powers to access new pathways.

== Reception ==
Astronot received positive reviews, currently sitting at 78/100 on Metacritic. Pocket Gamer scored the game a "Gold" score of 9/10, saying, "Astronot is a great example of how a platformer doesn't have to be tied down in straight lines. This is a game that doesn't just encourage you to think for yourself, but forces you to." However, it also acknowledged that "[t]he esoteric nature of the game won't be to everyone's taste". Carter Dotson of 148Apps awarded the game 4 stars out of 5, and wrote, "I simultaneously find myself wishing that Astronot held my hand a bit more", citing, among other things, the game's lack of an in-game map: "It is extremely easy to get lost here." He concluded that "Astronot nails the retro experience like no other game on the App Store ever has", but added, "[t]hat's not always in the player's best interest". TouchArcade gave it 4 stars out of 5, calling it "an ugly game" and "a genuinely good game that's kind of bad", but nevertheless concluded, "it's also a lot of fun, and interesting enough that, given my resistance to cheating, I have a feeling I'll be squatting my way through for another solid three or four weeks." AppSpy was less positive, scoring the game 3 out of 5; it wrote that Astronot was "[p]erfect for platformer fans and those who love exploring", but argued that the game was not for everyone, saying of the game's lack of a map, "whether that's a positive or a negative to you will be a good indicator of whether or not you'll have fun with this title."
