= Northern Belle =

American transatlantic ship

Coordinates: 51°23′40″N 1°25′40″E

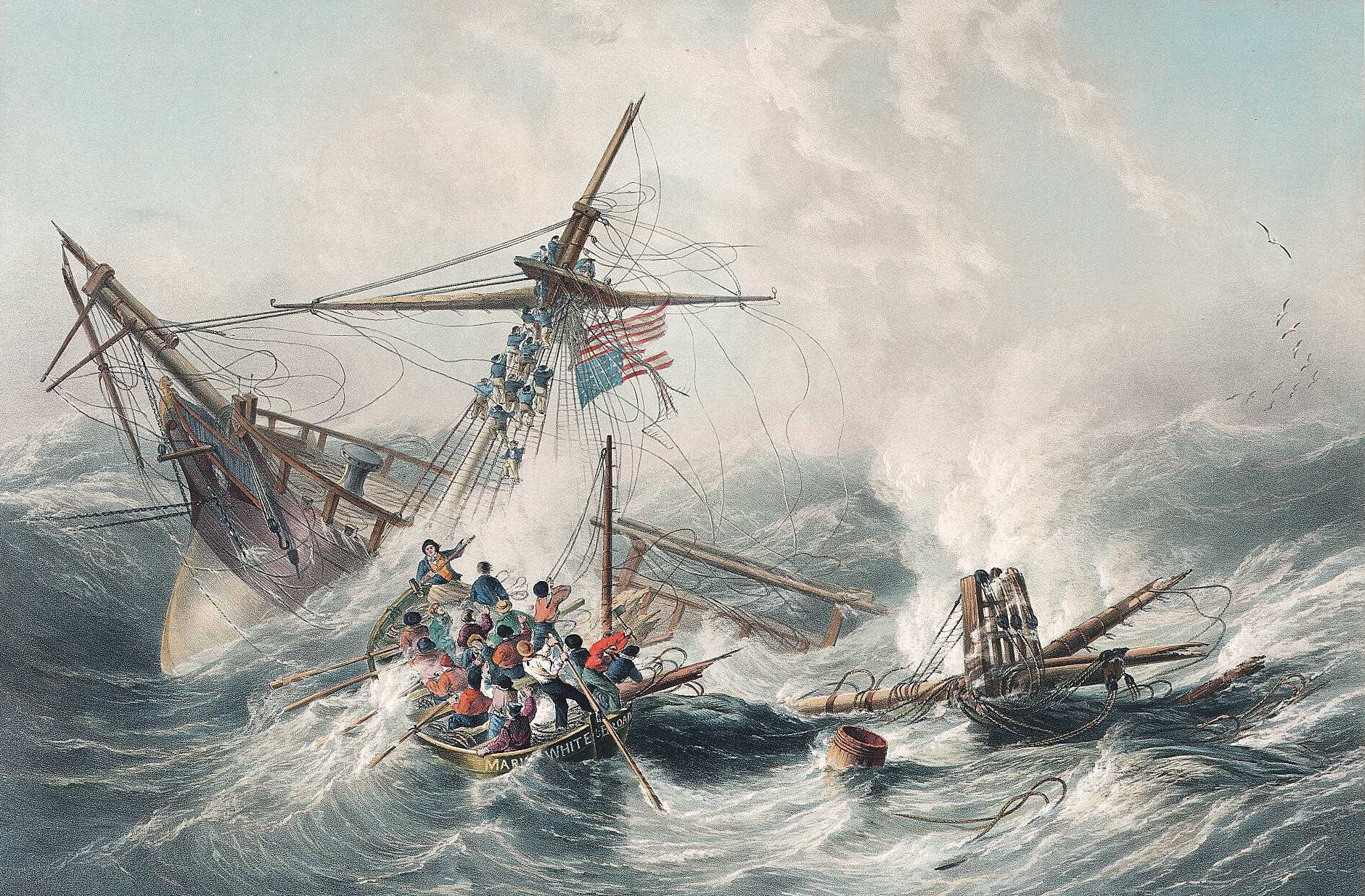
Painting depicting the rescue of the crew of the Northern Belle, 1857

The Northern Belle was an American transatlantic ship which ran aground near Thanet, England, on 5 January 1857. No lives on her were lost, thanks to heroic rescue efforts, in blizzard conditions. However, another ship sank, en route to the scene, the Margate lugger Victory which was lost along with her crew.

The Belle was constructed in 1853, under the ownership of J. P. Whitney and Co. of New Orleans. Her common routes were New Orleans to Liverpool and Le Havre, carrying wheat on the outbound run. A barque of 1,150 tons burden with a crew of 23, she was on a voyage from New York to London, with a cargo of wheat, flour, and linseed cake, when as a result of an unusually heavy gale had to put into Kingsgate, Kent. She anchored 3/4 of a mile from the shore, however by 6 am she was riding heavily, the sea occasionally breaking completely over her. The storm was so ferocious that the main and mizzen masts were cut away by the crew at 6.30am. The Margate lugger Victory, along with the Ocean, and the Eclipse attempted a rescue and possible salvage. The Victory was lost along with her crew at 11.30 am. The storm raged all day and local lifeboats were not able to launch. The Belle parted from her anchors at midnight, and was driven onto the rocks beneath nearby cliffs, at Foreness Point. The crew lashed themselves to the one remaining mast and were spotted from the beach at dawn. Two lifeboats, the Mary White and the Culmer White, made three trips to rescue them. The lifeboats and crew were from Broadstairs and Margate. The Mary White had to be hauled and dragged two miles over fields of snow to bring it to a place from which it could be launched. Captain Tate and his crew from the Northern Belle were all saved.

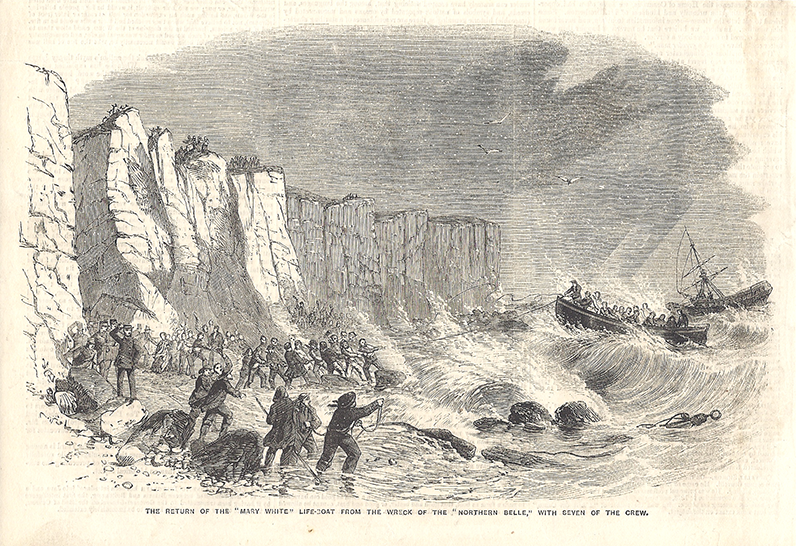
The return of the Mary White from the wreck of the Northern Belle with seven of the crew

On 15 January 1857 (Thursday) the Illustrated Times of London advertised that they would print five engravings of the tragedy and portraits of the crew the following Saturday.

It was reported on 22 January, in a letter to the London Evening Standard, that the ship and cargo were still on the reef, in good condition, and were salvageable.

News of the disaster was broadcast world-wide, as far as the Sydney Morning Herald who picked up the story from the New York Times. A benefit by "gentlemen amateurs" was held at the St James's Theatre, in London, on 7 February.

On 23 February 1857 3,340 barrels of damaged American flour, part of the cargo, was auctioned off at the New Corn Exchange Coffee House, Mark Lane, London. On 2 March, another 450 barrels of damaged American flour and 20 barrels of damaged linseed cake was auctioned at the coffee house.

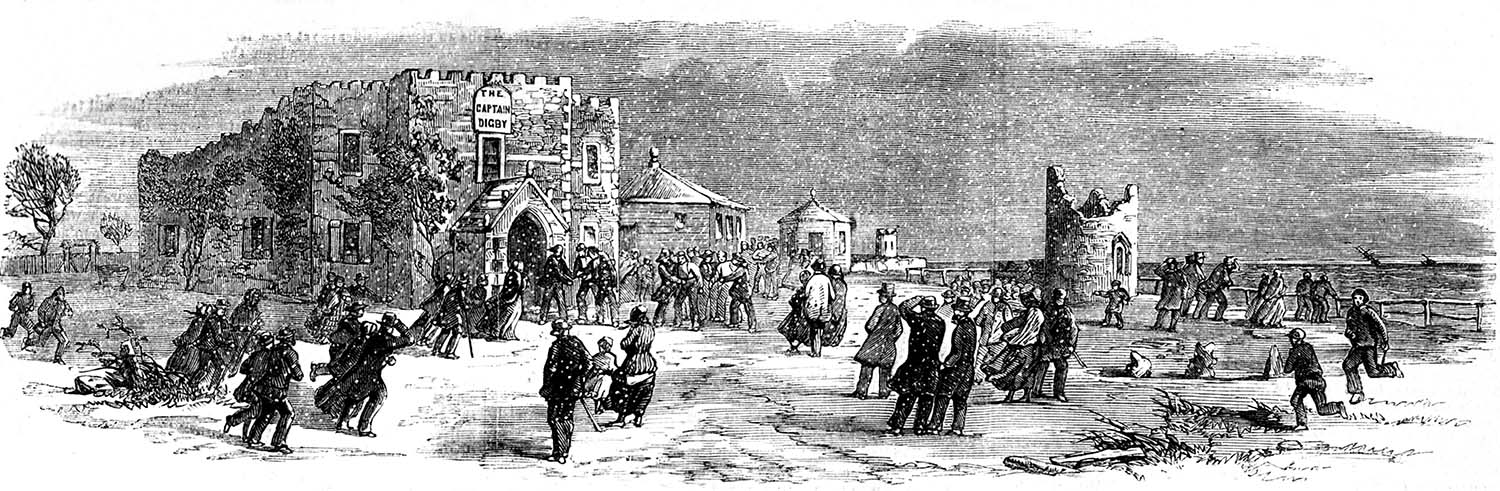
The rescued crew are taken to The Captain Digby

The Times reported on 5 March that the vessel was a shipping hazard and all her cargo had been salvaged except forty to fifty logs of mahogany. It was thought that only two barrels of dynamite would be required to destroy the wreck. The Liverpool Echo pointed out on 9 March 1857 that the wreck in foggy weather was an obstacle to navigation, "A few days ago a ship had a narrow escape by striking it."

In April 1857, the U.S. president Franklin Pierce had 21 silver medals struck and issued an award of £270 sterling for sharing amongst the rescuers, £10–£30 per man.

The London Morning Chronicle of 9 October 1857 reported that the wreck was to be raised, and that chains had been fitted with a view of floating her with the aid of buoys at the next spring tides. Some Whitstable people had bought the hull for £260.

Attempts to raise the Belle on 21 November 1857 were unsuccessful despite successfully raising the stern out of the water with the help of four pontoons. One of the chains around the hull broke during the process, aborting the attempt. The masts disappeared from view in early December, and a green buoy marked "Wreck" was put in place 10 fathoms eastward from the stern.

In June 1858 Canterbury Town Council, put on display a piece of the wreck taken from the recently raised hull, which was completely riddled with Teredo worm.

A Margate beer shop was named the Northern Belle in 1858.

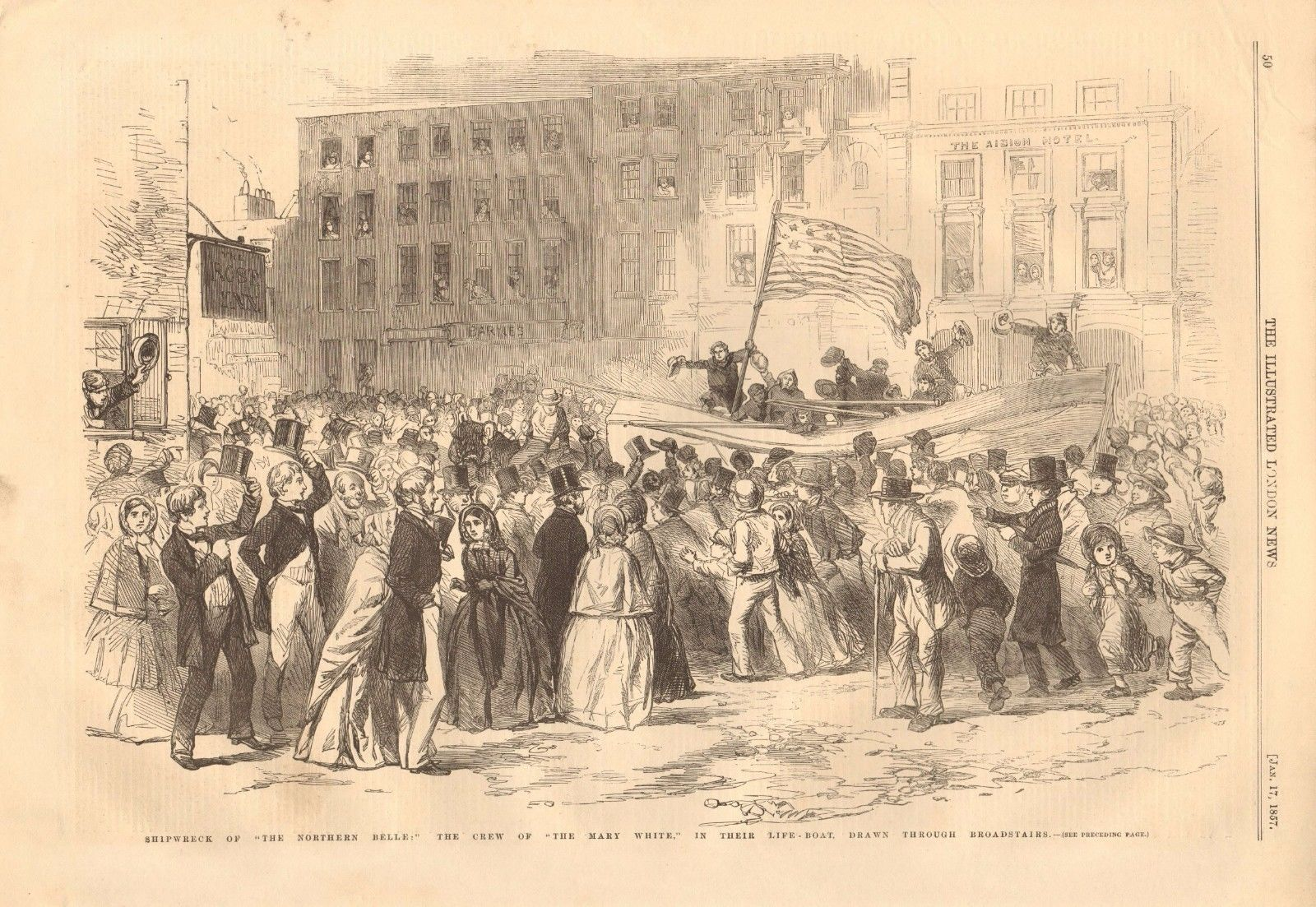
The crew of the Mary White in their life-boat are drawn through Broadstairs on 6 January 1857.

== Legacy ==
The tragedy inspired several literary works including novels and poetry. Charles Mackay published a poem "Northern Belle – a tribute to the brave", in February 1857. Edwin Arnold wrote "The Wreck of the Northern Belle" with the proceeds to go to representatives of the Victory crew.
