= Field Artillery Missileman's Badge =

- Type: Badge
- Presented by: 9th Field Artillery Missile Group, United States Army
- Eligibility: Proficiency on various missile systems
- Status: Discontinued
- First award: 1976
- Final award: 1979

The Field Artillery Missileman's Badge is a local individual award created by the 9th Field Artillery Missile Group to recognize proficiency on the various missile systems. It was awarded from December 1976 through 1979. The intent of the badge was similar to the Pershing Professionals Badge awarded by the 56th Artillery Group.

The 9th Field Artillery Missile Group included these subordinate units:

- 3rd Battalion, 9th Field Artillery Regiment (Pershing)
- 3rd Battalion, 38th Field Artillery Regiment (Sergeant)
- 1st Battalion, 12th Field Artillery Regiment (Lance)
- 3rd Battalion, 33rd Field Artillery Regiment
- Field Artillery Missile System Evaluation Group

The badge is rectangular with a silver missile inscribed with U. S. Army on a red enameled background. It was issued in three levels: basic, senior and master. Cloth versions of the badge were available for sew-on wear. The senior version had a star and the master version had a star and wreath,

In 1978, the Army began to rescind authorization for local uniforms and awards and the badge was withdrawn in 1979.
