= Mary White (lifeboat) =

Coordinates: 51°21′27″N 1°26′38″E

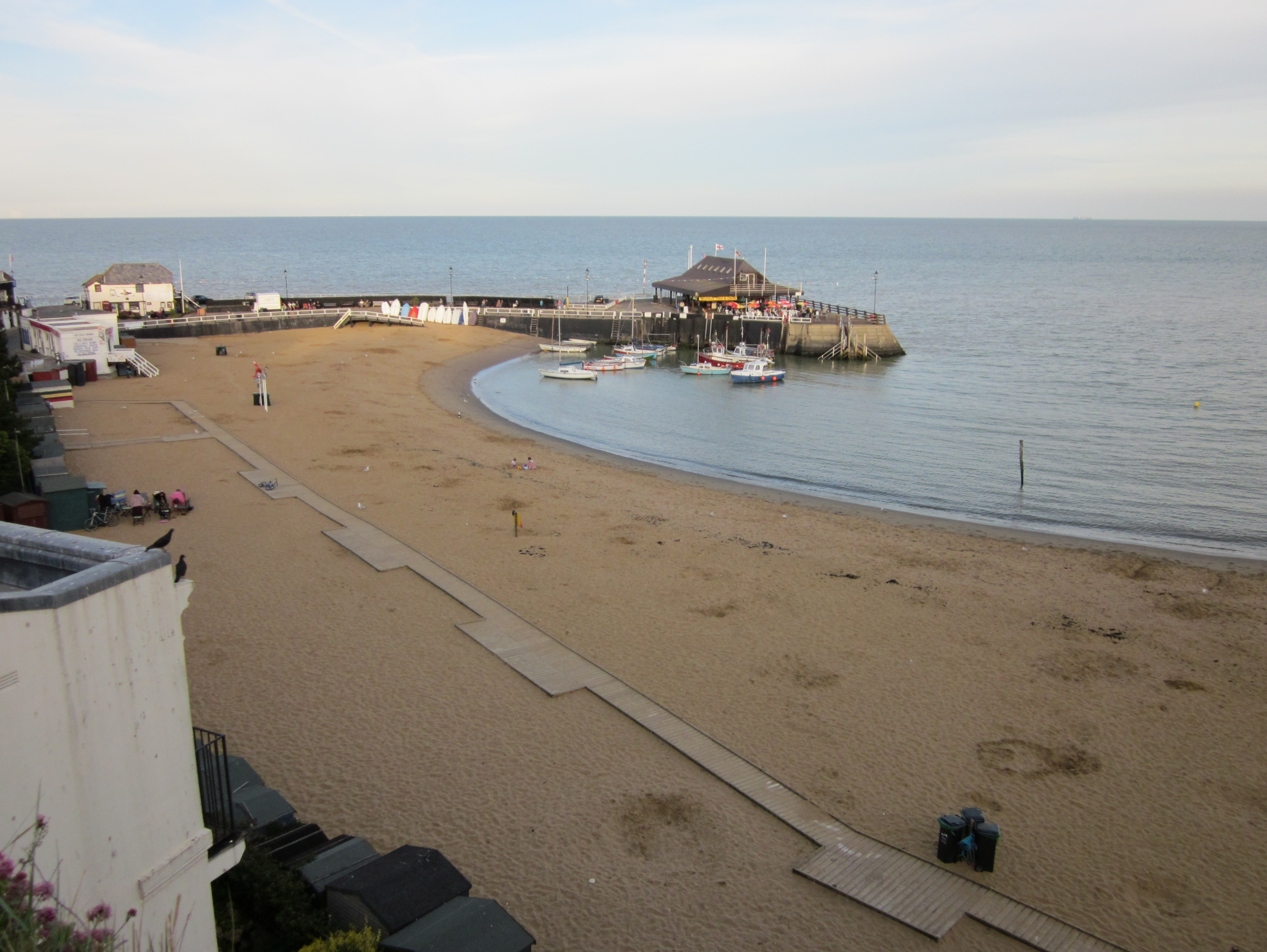
The lifeboat was launched from Broadstairs beach.

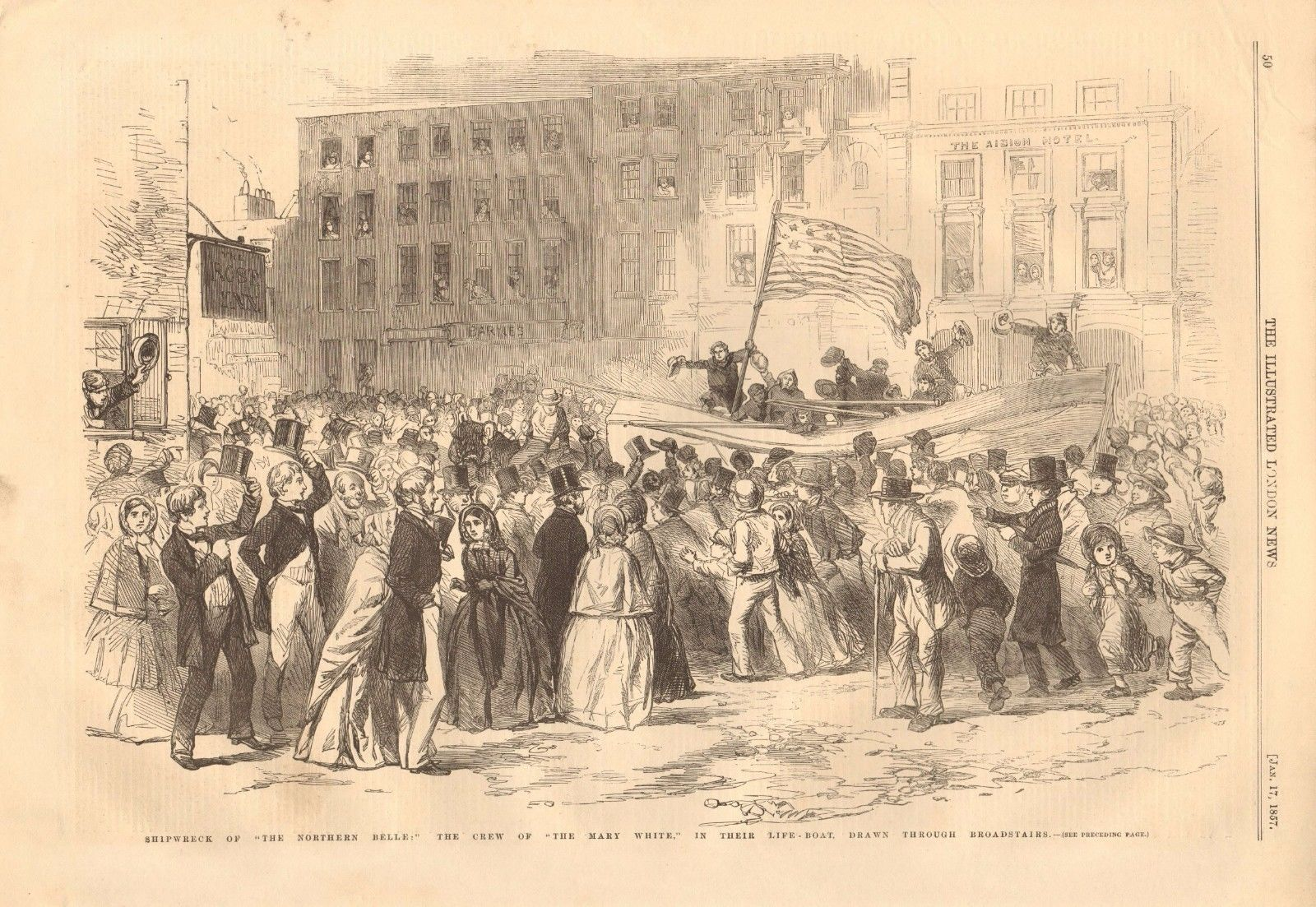
The crew of Mary White in their lifeboat drawn through Broadstairs

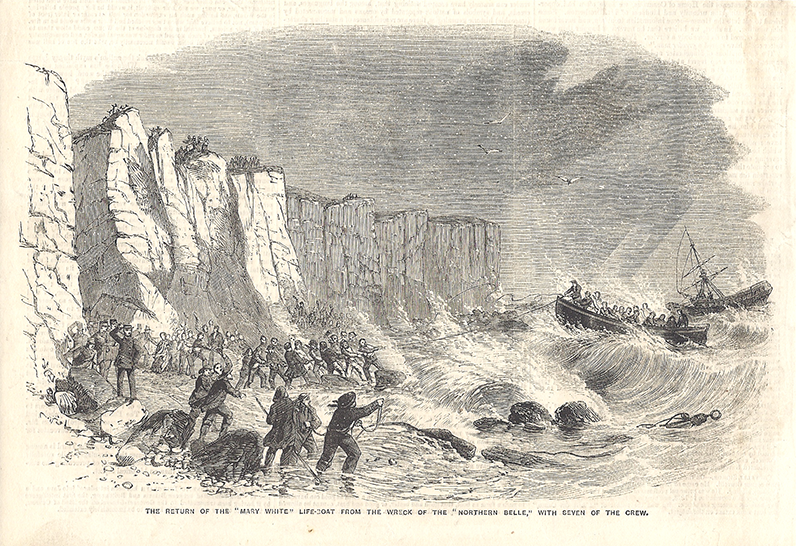
The return of Mary White from the wreck of Northern Belle with seven of the crew

Mary White was a lifeboat based in Broadstairs, Kent, England, named in 1851 after the completion of an heroic rescue of a brig, the Mary White.

Mary White with her sister boat, Culmer White, took part in the rescue of Northern Belle in January 1857. Northern Belle was a US transatlantic ship which ran aground near Thanet in blizzard conditions. Culmer White and Mary White made repeated trips to the damaged Belle and saved the entire crew.

== See also ==
- Song of the Mary White
- Culmer White
