= Rocket Man =

Rocket Man, Rocketman, Rocketmen, etc., may refer to:

- a person who uses rockets
- a colloquial term for an astronaut or cosmonaut

== Film, television and audio plays ==
- The Rocket Man (1954 film), a comedy film
- RocketMan (1997 film), a science-fiction comedy film
- Rocket Man (TV series), a 2005 UK drama series starring Robson Green
- Rocketman (film), a 2019 film about Elton John
- Rocketmen (film), a 2009 documentary about the U.S. space program
- Rocketman, a 2019 documentary about "Mad" Mike Hughes
- "The Rocket Men", a 2011 audio play series episode of Doctor Who: The Companion Chronicles
- "Rocket Man", a 2007 TV series episode of Law & Order: Criminal Intent (season 6)
- "Rocket Men", a season 4 episode of The Loud House
- Rocket Man, the protagonist of the 1949 Republic Pictures serial film King of the Rocket Men

== Literature ==
- Rocket Men (book), a 2018 book about the 1968 Apollo 8 mission
- "The Rocket Man", a 1951 short story by Ray Bradbury, collected in The Illustrated Man
- Rocket Man, a manga series by Motohiro Katou
- "Rocketman!!", a 2005 manga series chapter, see list of One Piece chapters (187–388)
- "Rocketman", an identity adopted by a character in Thomas Pynchon's novel Gravity's Rainbow

== Music ==
- "Rocket Man" (song), a 1972 song by Elton John
- Rocket Man: The Definitive Hits, a 2007 Elton John compilation
- Rocket Man: Greatest Hits Live, a 2007–2010 Elton John tour
- "The Rocket Man", a 1962 song by The Spotnicks, from Out-a-Space
- "Rocket Man", a 1970 song by Pearls Before Swine, from The Use of Ashes
- "Rocketman", a 2021 song by BGYO, from their debut album The Light

== Games ==
- Rocketmen (card game)
- Rocketmen: Axis of Evil, video game

== People ==
- Gabriel Araújo (swimmer) (born 2002), Brazilian Paralympic swimmer
- Ryan Newman (racing driver) (born 1977), NASCAR Cup Series driver
- Joe Rokocoko (born 1983), New Zealand rugby union player
- Kim Jong Un (born 1982 or 1983), leader of North Korea nicknamed "Rocket Man" by American president Donald Trump
- Yves Rossy (born 1959), Swiss aviator and inventor of a fixed-wing jet pack
- Ryo Fukawa (born 1974), Japanese comedian and musician also known as ROCKETMAN

== See also ==
- Azizulhasni Awang (born 1988), Malaysian track cyclist nicknamed the "Pocket Rocketman"
- Rocketeer (disambiguation)
