= Missal (disambiguation) =

A missal is a Christian liturgical book.

Missal may also refer to:

== Religion ==
- Anglican Missal, anglo-catholic liturgical book
- English Missal, anglo-catholic liturgical book
- Leofric Missal, illuminated medieval English sacramentary
- Roman Missal, liturgical book of the Roman Rite
- Stowe Missal, illuminated medieval Irish sacramentary

== Other ==
- Missal, Paraná, a municipality in Brazil
- Stephen Missal (born 1948), American artist
