= Missileer =

Missileer may refer to:

- Douglas F6D Missileer, a proposed carrier-based US Navy fleet defense fighter aircraft
- Missile combat crew, a team of highly trained specialists, often called missileers, manning missile systems
