= Thanet Loop =

Bus route in Kent, England

Loop
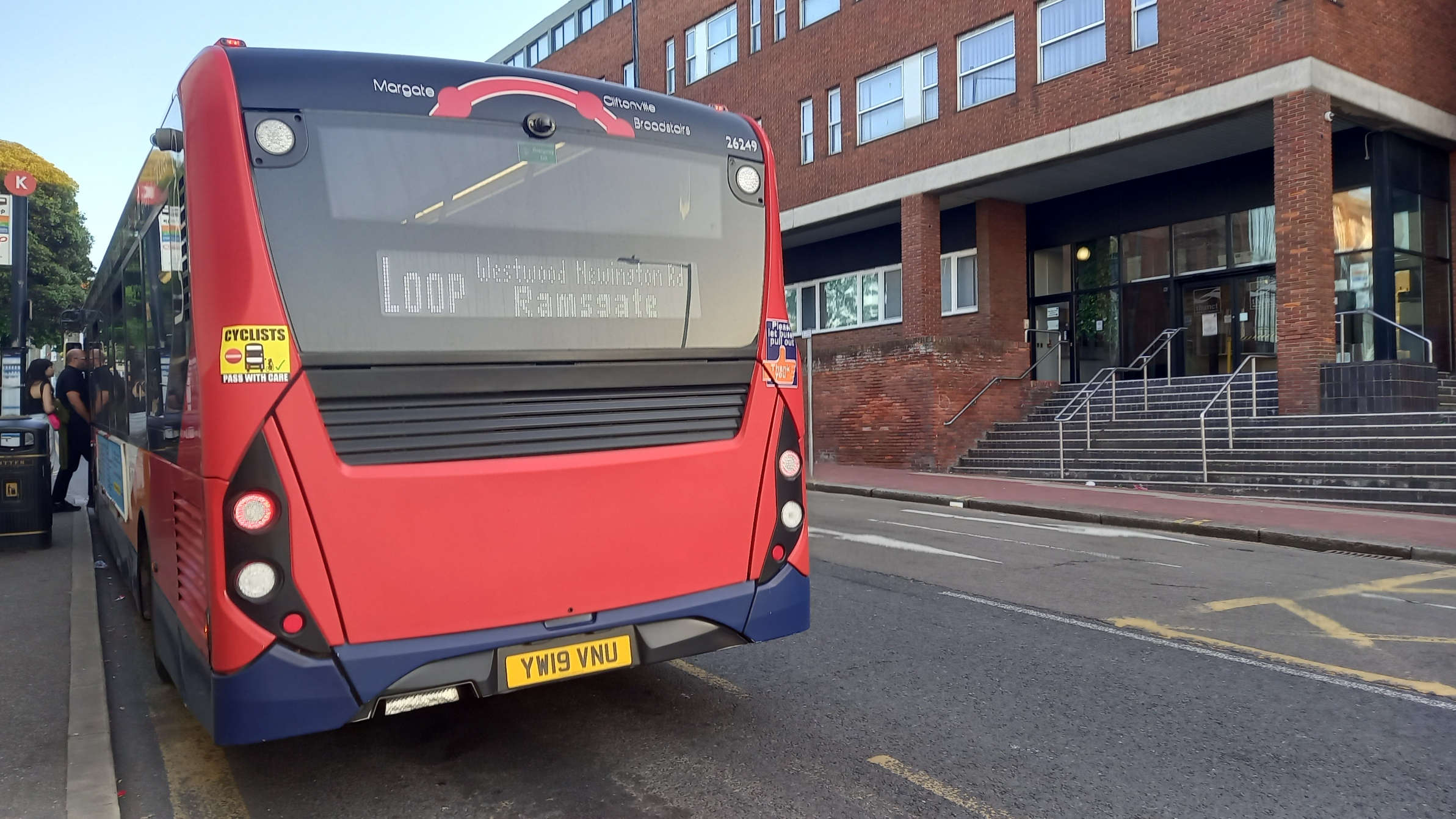
- A Thanet Loop Alexander Dennis Enviro200 MMC in Margate in June 2023

Overview
- Operator: Stagecoach South East
- Vehicle: Alexander Dennis Enviro200 MMC
- Status: In operation
- Began service: October 2004

Route
- Locale: Isle of Thanet
- Termini: Margate
- Via: Cliftonville; Ramsgate; Newington; Westwood
- Length: 14 miles (23 km)

Service
- Frequency: 8 minutes maximum
- Timetable: LOOP Bus Route & Timetable

The Thanet Loop is a circular bus route which operates on the Isle of Thanet peninsula in Kent, England. It is operated by Stagecoach South East.

== History ==
The route was introduced in 2004 following a grant of £447,000 from the Department for Transport and had an initial fleet of 18 buses. In 2013, 27 Alexander Dennis Enviro200 buses were purchased for the route. In 2018, the route carried over four million passengers. In 2019, a new fleet of 24 new Alexander Dennis Enviro200 MMC buses was introduced.

== Route ==
The service has a circular 14-mile (23 km) route which passes through Ramsgate, Margate, and Broadstairs. It also calls at Queen Elizabeth The Queen Mother Hospital and Westwood Cross. Buses operate at a maximum frequency of every 8 minutes Monday-Saturday, and every 10 minutes on Sundays.
