= Listed buildings in Broadstairs and St Peters =

Civil Parish in Kent, England

Broadstairs and St Peter's is a civil parish in the Thanet District of Kent, England. The parish comprises the settlements of Broadstairs, St Peter's and Westwood, including Westwood Cross. It contains one grade II* and 139 grade II listed buildings that are recorded in the National Heritage List for England.

This list is based on the information retrieved online from Historic England

== Key ==
Grade	Criteria
I	Buildings that are of exceptional interest
II*	Particularly important buildings of more than special interest
II	Buildings that are of special interest

== Listing ==
Name	Grade	Location	Type	Completed (Note: The date given is the date used by Historic England as significant for the initial building or that of an important part in the structure's description.)	Date designated	Grid ref. (Note: Sometimes known as OSGB36, the grid reference is based on the British national grid reference system used by the Ordnance Survey.) Geo-coordinates	Notes	Entry number (Note: The "List Entry Number" is a unique number assigned to each listed building and scheduled monument by Historic England.)	Image	Wikidata
Royal Albion Hotel	II	Albion Street, Broadstairs And St. Peters, Broadstairs			20 September 1974	TR3975567796; 51°21′31″N 1°26′33″E		1274241	Upload Photo	Q26563921
14, Albion Street	II	14, Albion Street, Broadstairs And St. Peters, Broadstairs			20 September 1974	TR3976467799; 51°21′31″N 1°26′33″E		1239144	Upload Photo	Q26532156
16 and 18, Albion Street	II	16 and 18, Albion Street, Broadstairs And St. Peters, Broadstairs			20 September 1974	TR3977267807; 51°21′31″N 1°26′33″E		1238365	Upload Photo	Q26531427
20, Albion Street	II	20, Albion Street, Broadstairs And St. Peters, Broadstairs			20 September 1974	TR3977567817; 51°21′32″N 1°26′34″E		1273826	Upload Photo	Q26563538
22, Albion Street	II	22, Albion Street, Broadstairs And St. Peters, Broadstairs			20 September 1974	TR3977867823; 51°21′32″N 1°26′34″E		1274242	Upload Photo	Q26563922
24, Albion Street	II	24, Albion Street, Broadstairs And St. Peters, Broadstairs			20 September 1974	TR3978067827; 51°21′32″N 1°26′34″E		1239179	Upload Photo	Q26532187
26, Albion Street	II	26, Albion Street, Broadstairs And St. Peters, Broadstairs			20 September 1974	TR3978267831; 51°21′32″N 1°26′34″E		1274203	Upload Photo	Q26563887
Barfield House	II	30 and 32, Albion Street, Broadstairs And St. Peters, Broadstairs			11 February 1969	TR3979867861; 51°21′33″N 1°26′35″E		1238368	Upload Photo	Q26531430
St Mary's Chapel	II	44, Albion Street, Broadstairs And St. Peters			20 September 1974	TR3981167900; 51°21′34″N 1°26′36″E		1239199	Upload Photo	Q26532205
48 and 50, Albion Street	II	48 and 50, Albion Street, Broadstairs And St. Peters, Broadstairs			20 September 1974	TR3981467909; 51°21′35″N 1°26′36″E		1238371	Upload Photo	Q26531433
1, Astor Road	II	1, Astor Road, Broadstairs And St. Peters, Broadstairs			20 September 1974	TR3883769536; 51°22′29″N 1°25′49″E		1267552	Upload Photo	Q26557942
Callis Court	II	Baird's Hill, Broadstairs And St. Peters, Broadstairs			24 January 1950	TR3882168550; 51°21′57″N 1°25′46″E		1239226	Upload Photo	Q26532224
39-43, Belvedere Road	II	39-43, Belvedere Road, Broadstairs And St. Peters, Broadstairs			20 September 1974	TR3957767755; 51°21′30″N 1°26′23″E		1238378	Upload Photo	Q26531439
Junction of High Street and Pierremont Avenue	II	Broadstairs, CT10 1JX, Broadstairs And St. Peters			17 March 2016	TR3938467871; 51°21′34″N 1°26′14″E		1433337	Upload Photo	Q26677914
107 Westwood Road, Broadstairs	II	107 Westwood Road, Broadstairs, CT10 2NP, Broadstairs And St. Peters			3 December 2014	TR3709267864; 51°21′37″N 1°24′15″E		1422782	Upload Photo	Q26676976
204 Ramsgate Road, Broadstairs	II	204 Ramsgate Road, Broadstairs, CT10 2EW, Broadstairs And St. Peters			3 February 2021	TR3870066618; 51°20′55″N 1°25′35″E		1470399	Upload Photo	Q105721202
K6 Telephone Kiosk Outside Harbour Office	II	Broadstairs And St. Peters, Broadstairs			6 January 1988	TR3995767870; 51°21′33″N 1°26′43″E		1267334	Upload Photo	Q26557739
Selwyn Court	II	62 St Peters Road, CT10 2SR, Broadstairs And St. Peters, St Peters			20 September 1974	TR3859968278; 51°21′48″N 1°25′34″E		1267555	Upload Photo	Q26557945
Roman Catholic Church of Our Lady Star of the Sea	II	Broadstairs Road, Broadstairs And St. Peters, Broadstairs			19 January 1982	TR3878767999; 51°21′39″N 1°25′43″E		1267330	Upload Photo	Q26557735
Kingsdown Farmhouse	II	Bromstone Road, Broadstairs And St. Peters, Broadstairs			20 September 1974	TR3839867363; 51°21′19″N 1°25′21″E		1239253	Upload Photo	Q26532249
Bromstone House Cottage	II	90, Bromstone Road, Broadstairs And St. Peters, Broadstairs			11 February 1969	TR3818367497; 51°21′24″N 1°25′11″E		1239256	Upload Photo	Q26532252
Long Barn	II	Callis Court Road, Broadstairs And St. Peters, Broadstairs			7 February 2007	TR3895269041; 51°22′12″N 1°25′54″E		1391855	Upload Photo	Q26671197
13, Charlotte Street	II	13, Charlotte Street, Broadstairs And St. Peters, Broadstairs			20 September 1974	TR3972267734; 51°21′29″N 1°26′31″E		1223078	Upload Photo	Q26517358
Fort Cottages	II	Church Road, Broadstairs And St. Peters, Broadstairs			21 January 2000	TR3990067995; 51°21′37″N 1°26′41″E		1380072	Upload Photo	Q26660288
1 and 2, Church Square	II	1 and 2, Church Square, Broadstairs And St. Peters, Broadstairs			20 September 1974	TR3984667978; 51°21′37″N 1°26′38″E		1239258	Upload Photo	Q26532254
3-5, Church Square	II	3-5, Church Square, Broadstairs And St. Peters, Broadstairs			20 September 1974	TR3984867968; 51°21′36″N 1°26′38″E		1273790	Upload Photo	Q26563506
Wash-houses	II	3-8, Church Square, Broadstairs And St. Peters			26 September 1989	TR3983567966; 51°21′36″N 1°26′37″E		1267338	Upload Photo	Q26557743
6, 7 and 8, Church Square	II	6, 7 and 8, Church Square, Broadstairs And St. Peters			26 September 1989	TR3984667959; 51°21′36″N 1°26′38″E		1267336	Upload Photo	Q26557741
Green Acres	II	Church Street, Broadstairs And St. Peters, St Peters			20 September 1974	TR3817568557; 51°21′58″N 1°25′13″E		1239315	Upload Photo	Q26532304
Parish Church of St Peter the Apostle	II*	Church Street, Broadstairs And St. Peters, St Peters			20 September 1974	TR3808368451; 51°21′55″N 1°25′08″E		1273791	Upload Photo	Q17546667
Wall to St Peter's Churchyard	II	Church Street, Broadstairs And St. Peters, St Peters			20 September 1974	TR3804968490; 51°21′56″N 1°25′06″E		1239261	Upload Photo	Q26532257
The Old Farm House	II	13, Church Street, Broadstairs And St. Peters, St Peters			24 January 1950	TR3813168513; 51°21′57″N 1°25′10″E		1273792	Upload Photo	Q26563507
26, Church Street	II	26, Church Street, Broadstairs And St. Peters, St Peters			22 April 1975	TR3819368549; 51°21′58″N 1°25′14″E		1272409	Upload Photo	Q26562251
Gatehouse at Port Regis School	II	Convent Road, Broadstairs And St. Peters, Broadstairs			20 September 1974	TR3942870273; 51°22′52″N 1°26′22″E		1239263	Upload Photo	Q26532259
Hackemdown Tower	II	Convent Road, Broadstairs And St. Peters, Broadstairs			20 September 1974	TR3954570282; 51°22′52″N 1°26′28″E		1239264	Upload Photo	Q26532260
King's Gate in Grounds of Port Regis School	II	Convent Road, Broadstairs And St. Peters, Broadstairs			20 September 1974	TR3951670302; 51°22′52″N 1°26′26″E		1239439	Upload Photo	Q26532418
Lodge to Port Regis School	II	Convent Road, Broadstairs And St. Peters, Broadstairs			20 September 1974	TR3939070229; 51°22′50″N 1°26′20″E		1273793	Upload Photo	Q26563508
Port Regis School	II	Convent Road, Broadstairs And St. Peters, Broadstairs			20 September 1974	TR3945270279; 51°22′52″N 1°26′23″E		1239262	Upload Photo	Q26532258
Thanet Lodge	II	6, Crow Hill, Broadstairs And St. Peters, Broadstairs			11 February 1969	TR3968168200; 51°21′44″N 1°26′30″E		1273796	Upload Photo	Q26563511
Sacketts Hill Farmhouse	II	Dane Court Road, Broadstairs And St. Peters, St Peters			24 January 1950	TR3694968672; 51°22′04″N 1°24′10″E		1273688	Upload Photo	Q26563406
Dumpton Farmhouse	II	Dumpton Farm Lane, Broadstairs And St. Peters, Broadstairs			20 September 1974	TR3876966523; 51°20′51″N 1°25′39″E		1239271	Upload Photo	Q26532265
1, Eldon Place	II	1, Eldon Place, Broadstairs And St. Peters, Broadstairs			11 February 1969	TR3982667874; 51°21′33″N 1°26′36″E		1239475	Upload Photo	Q26532451
2 and 2a, Eldon Place	II	2 and 2a, Eldon Place, Broadstairs And St. Peters, Broadstairs			11 February 1969	TR3982967877; 51°21′33″N 1°26′37″E		1239273	Upload Photo	Q26532267
Cliff Edge	II	3, Eldon Place, Broadstairs And St. Peters, Broadstairs			11 February 1969	TR3983067882; 51°21′34″N 1°26′37″E		1239489	Upload Photo	Q26532465
Elmwood Farmhouse	II	Elmwood Avenue, Broadstairs And St. Peters, Reading Street			20 September 1974	TR3926469451; 51°22′25″N 1°26′11″E		1239491	Upload Photo	Q26532467
Bleak House	II	Fort Road, Broadstairs And St. Peters, Broadstairs			20 September 1974	TR3993467939; 51°21′35″N 1°26′42″E		1239493	Upload Photo	Q4925737
Flint House	II	Harbour Street, Broadstairs And St. Peters, Broadstairs			20 September 1974	TR3986767906; 51°21′34″N 1°26′39″E		1239497	Upload Photo	Q26532472
Flint Wall between Flint House and No 27 Harbour Street	II	Harbour Street, Broadstairs And St. Peters, Broadstairs			20 September 1974	TR3987367895; 51°21′34″N 1°26′39″E		1273701	Upload Photo	Q26563419
The York Gate	II	Harbour Street, Broadstairs And St. Peters, Broadstairs			24 January 1950	TR3988967877; 51°21′33″N 1°26′40″E		1273644	Upload Photo	Q26563364
Wall to the North East of Flint House	II	Harbour Street, Broadstairs And St. Peters, Broadstairs			20 September 1974	TR3988667900; 51°21′34″N 1°26′40″E		1239602	Upload Photo	Q26532572
Windsor Cinema	II	Harbour Street, Broadstairs And St. Peters, Broadstairs			20 September 1974	TR3985867872; 51°21′33″N 1°26′38″E		1273607	Upload Photo	Q26563331
Neptune Hall Public House	II	1 3 and 5, Harbour Street, Broadstairs And St. Peters			15 February 1999	TR3983667934; 51°21′35″N 1°26′37″E		1245428	Upload Photo	Q26537968
The Old Curiosity Shop	II	9, Harbour Street, Broadstairs And St. Peters, Broadstairs			25 September 1972	TR3985267924; 51°21′35″N 1°26′38″E		1239494	Upload Photo	Q26532469
Lawn Cottage	II	13, Harbour Street, Broadstairs And St. Peters, Broadstairs			20 September 1974	TR3986267925; 51°21′35″N 1°26′38″E		1239495	Upload Photo	Q26532470
15, Harbour Street	II	15, Harbour Street, Broadstairs And St. Peters, Broadstairs			20 September 1974	TR3986767926; 51°21′35″N 1°26′39″E		1239587	Upload Photo	Q26532556
17, Harbour Street	II	17, Harbour Street, Broadstairs And St. Peters, Broadstairs			20 September 1974	TR3987067923; 51°21′35″N 1°26′39″E		1239496	Upload Photo	Q26532471
Broadstairs Entertainment Department Office	II	18, Harbour Street, Broadstairs And St. Peters, Broadstairs			20 September 1974	TR3988467874; 51°21′33″N 1°26′39″E		1239627	Upload Photo	Q26532595
Archway House	II	19, Harbour Street, Broadstairs And St. Peters, Broadstairs			20 September 1974	TR3987467920; 51°21′35″N 1°26′39″E		1273632	Upload Photo	Q26563354
The Tartar Frigate Public House	II	37, Harbour Street, Broadstairs And St. Peters, Broadstairs			20 September 1974	TR3993667883; 51°21′34″N 1°26′42″E		1273645	Upload Photo	Q26563365
Cove Cottage	II	High Street, Broadstairs And St. Peters, St Peters			20 September 1974	TR3827768368; 51°21′52″N 1°25′18″E		1239633	Upload Photo	Q26532601
Crampton Tower	II	High Street, Broadstairs And St. Peters, Broadstairs			20 September 1974	TR3911567924; 51°21′36″N 1°26′00″E		1239630	Upload Photo	Q26532598
Nuckell's Almshouses	II	High Street, Broadstairs And St. Peters, St Peters			24 January 1950	TR3823768408; 51°21′53″N 1°25′16″E		1273584	Upload Photo	Q26563313
Pierremont Hall	II	High Street, Broadstairs And St. Peters, Broadstairs			11 February 1969	TR3941667835; 51°21′33″N 1°26′15″E		1239628	Upload Photo	Q26532596
Bradstow House	II	9, 11a, 11b and 15, High Street, Broadstairs And St. Peters, Broadstairs			11 February 1969	TR3967567785; 51°21′31″N 1°26′28″E		1273608	Upload Photo	Q26563332
19, High Street	II	19, High Street, Broadstairs And St. Peters, St Peters			20 September 1974	TR3815468423; 51°21′54″N 1°25′11″E		1239632	Upload Photo	Q26532600
St Peters Church Hall	II	Hopeville Avenue, Broadstairs, CT10 2TR, Broadstairs And St. Peters			19 February 2020	TR3810168437; 51°21′54″N 1°25′09″E		1468382	Upload Photo	Q94345375
Seven Stones House	II	Including Attached Garages, Workshops And Garden House, Boundary And Garden Walls, Gatepiers, Gates And Terrace Walls, 5, South Cliff Parade, Broadstairs And St. Peters, Broadstairs			10 October 2003	TR3946266340; 51°20′44″N 1°26′14″E		1390592	Upload Photo	Q26669980
Arx Ruohim	II	Kingsgate Bay Road, Broadstairs And St. Peters, Kingsgate			20 September 1974	TR3952370939; 51°23′13″N 1°26′28″E		1239838	Upload Photo	Q26532785
Captain Digby Inn	II	Kingsgate Bay Road, Broadstairs And St. Peters, Kingsgate			20 September 1974	TR3950270684; 51°23′05″N 1°26′26″E		1239637	Upload Photo	Q26532603
Holland End	II	Kingsgate Bay Road, Broadstairs And St. Peters, Kingsgate			24 January 1950	TR3957370558; 51°23′01″N 1°26′30″E		1273614	Upload Photo	Q26563337
Kingsgate Castle	II	Kingsgate Bay Road, Broadstairs And St. Peters, Broadstairs			20 September 1974	TR3969370536; 51°23′00″N 1°26′36″E		1239636	Upload Photo	Q6413222
Remains of Lookout in Grounds of Castle Keep Hotel	II	Kingsgate Bay Road, Broadstairs And St. Peters, Broadstairs			20 September 1974	TR3978970490; 51°22′58″N 1°26′41″E		1273558	Upload Photo	Q26563289
25-29, Lanthorne Road	II	25-29, Lanthorne Road, Broadstairs And St. Peters, Broadstairs			20 September 1974	TR3964368958; 51°22′09″N 1°26′30″E		1273615	Upload Photo	Q26563338
Farm Cottage	II	34, Lanthorne Road, Broadstairs And St. Peters, Broadstairs			20 September 1974	TR3938069026; 51°22′11″N 1°26′16″E		1239872	Upload Photo	Q26532819
Holy Trinity Church	II	Nelson Place, Broadstairs And St. Peters, Broadstairs			24 January 1950	TR3983667996; 51°21′37″N 1°26′37″E		1222656	Upload Photo	Q26516974
K6 Telephone Kiosk	II	Nelson Place, Broadstairs And St. Peters, Broadstairs			6 January 1988	TR3973568078; 51°21′40″N 1°26′32″E		1223375	Upload Photo	Q26517646
14, Nelson Place	II	14, Nelson Place, Broadstairs And St. Peters, Broadstairs			20 September 1974	TR3974468102; 51°21′41″N 1°26′33″E		1267665	Upload Photo	Q26558046
21-25, Nelson Place	II	21-25, Nelson Place, Broadstairs And St. Peters, Broadstairs			20 September 1974	TR3974968049; 51°21′39″N 1°26′33″E		1239873	Upload Photo	Q26532820
Regent Cottage	II	33, Nelson Place, Broadstairs And St. Peters, Broadstairs			20 September 1974	TR3972068088; 51°21′40″N 1°26′31″E		1222609	Upload Photo	Q26516928
Pleasant Cottage	II	35, Nelson Place, Broadstairs And St. Peters, Broadstairs			20 September 1974	TR3968368098; 51°21′41″N 1°26′30″E		1267676	Upload Photo	Q26558057
Boundary and Kitchen Garden Wall to St Stephens College	II	North Foreland Road, Broadstairs And St. Peters			4 February 1992	TR3983969271; 51°22′19″N 1°26′40″E		1267272	Upload Photo	Q26557680
St Stephens College	II	North Foreland Road, Broadstairs And St. Peters			4 February 1992	TR3979569275; 51°22′19″N 1°26′38″E		1223387	Upload Photo	Q26517658
Stone House	II	North Foreland Road, Broadstairs And St. Peters, Broadstairs			24 January 1950	TR3968269013; 51°22′10″N 1°26′32″E		1267646	Upload Photo	Q26558031
Stone Lodge	II	North Foreland Road, Broadstairs And St. Peters, Broadstairs			20 September 1974	TR3976669055; 51°22′12″N 1°26′36″E		1267625	Upload Photo	Q26558012
The North Foreland Lighthouse Including Attached Lighthouse Keepers Houses	II	North Foreland Road, Broadstairs And St. Peters, Broadstairs			24 January 1950	TR3985969619; 51°22′30″N 1°26′42″E		1222802	Upload Photo	Q25803046
Wall Surrounding Stone House	II	North Foreland Road, Broadstairs And St. Peters, Broadstairs			20 September 1974	TR3965569010; 51°22′10″N 1°26′30″E		1222610	Upload Photo	Q26516929
Holly Lodge	II	179, Northwood Road, Broadstairs And St. Peters, Broadstairs			20 September 1974	TR3736667848; 51°21′36″N 1°24′29″E		1267677	Upload Photo	Q26558058
Arch in Grounds of 1a	II	Oaklands Avenue, Broadstairs, CT10 2SQ, Broadstairs And St. Peters			20 September 1974	TR3804568260; 51°21′49″N 1°25′05″E		1222613	Upload Photo	Q26516932
Admiralty Cottage	II	Pier Approach, Broadstairs And St. Peters, Broadstairs			28 September 1973	TR3995067884; 51°21′34″N 1°26′43″E		1273646	Upload Photo	Q26563366
The Cottage	II	Poorhole Lane, Broadstairs, CT10 2PP, Broadstairs And St. Peters			7 June 2017	TR3657068171; 51°21′48″N 1°23′49″E		1446509	Upload Photo	Q66478775
Westwood Lodge	II	Poorhole Lane, Broadstairs, CT10 2PP, Broadstairs And St. Peters			7 June 2017	TR3669368184; 51°21′48″N 1°23′55″E		1446506	Upload Photo	Q66478774
Westwood Lodge	II	Poorhole Lane, Broadstairs, CT10 2PP, Broadstairs And St. Peters			7 June 2017	TR3645468293; 51°21′52″N 1°23′43″E		1446510	Upload Photo	Q66478776
3-5, Raglan Place	II	3-5, Raglan Place, Broadstairs And St. Peters, Broadstairs			13 March 1974	TR3968467759; 51°21′30″N 1°26′29″E		1222616	Upload Photo	Q26516935
Yarrow Building at Thanet College	II	Ramsgate Road, Broadstairs And St. Peters			13 May 1998	TR3926967277; 51°21′15″N 1°26′06″E		1119746	Upload Photo	Q26413041
43, Ramsgate Road	II	43, Ramsgate Road, Broadstairs And St. Peters, Broadstairs			20 September 1974	TR3933867367; 51°21′18″N 1°26′10″E		1267578	Upload Photo	Q26557968
1 and 2, Ranelagh Gardens	II	1 and 2, Ranelagh Gardens, Broadstairs, CT10 2TJ, Broadstairs And St. Peters			20 September 1974	TR3815068322; 51°21′50″N 1°25′11″E		1223056	Upload Photo	Q26517338
2, Ranelagh Grove	II	2, Ranelagh Grove, Broadstairs And St. Peters, Broadstairs			5 May 1972	TR3818968307; 51°21′50″N 1°25′13″E		1267679	Upload Photo	Q26558060
4, Ranelagh Grove	II	4, Ranelagh Grove, Broadstairs And St. Peters, Broadstairs			23 June 1972	TR3817868297; 51°21′50″N 1°25′12″E		1222837	Upload Photo	Q26517135
Elmwood	II	Reading Street, Broadstairs And St. Peters, Broadstairs			16 January 1974	TR3906869456; 51°22′26″N 1°26′01″E		1267689	Upload Photo	Q26558068
K6 Telephone Kiosk	II	Reading Street, Broadstairs And St. Peters, Broadstairs			6 January 1988	TR3889969519; 51°22′28″N 1°25′53″E		1223405	Upload Photo	Q26679714
Rosemary	II	Reading Street, Broadstairs And St. Peters, Broadstairs			20 September 1974	TR3906269515; 51°22′28″N 1°26′01″E		1222933	Upload Photo	Q26517227
Rozine Cottage	II	Reading Street, Broadstairs And St. Peters, Broadstairs			11 February 1969	TR3889669529; 51°22′28″N 1°25′52″E		1222932	Upload Photo	Q26517226
Acton Cottage	II	11, Reading Street, Broadstairs And St. Peters, Broadstairs			20 September 1974	TR3881569532; 51°22′28″N 1°25′48″E		1222925	Upload Photo	Q26517218
Acton Cottage	II	13, Reading Street, Broadstairs And St. Peters, Broadstairs			20 September 1974	TR3882069530; 51°22′28″N 1°25′48″E		1222926	Upload Photo	Q26679669
15, Reading Street	II	15, Reading Street, Broadstairs And St. Peters, Broadstairs			20 September 1974	TR3883169533; 51°22′29″N 1°25′49″E		1267550	Upload Photo	Q26557940
White Swan Cottage	II	19, Reading Street, Broadstairs And St. Peters, Broadstairs			11 February 1969	TR3887069530; 51°22′28″N 1°25′51″E		1222931	Upload Photo	Q26517225
The Convent Cottages	II	43-49, Reading Street, Broadstairs And St. Peters, Broadstairs			20 September 1974	TR3900069515; 51°22′28″N 1°25′58″E		1267553	Upload Photo	Q26557943
Elmwood Cottage	II	48, Reading Street, Broadstairs And St. Peters, Broadstairs			20 September 1974	TR3900169472; 51°22′26″N 1°25′58″E		1267686	Upload Photo	Q26558066
Gardenia Cottage	II	52, Reading Street, Broadstairs And St. Peters, Broadstairs			20 September 1974	TR3901169460; 51°22′26″N 1°25′58″E		1267559	Upload Photo	Q26557949
Castle House	II	Serene Place, Broadstairs And St. Peters, Broadstairs			11 February 1969	TR3966767760; 51°21′30″N 1°26′28″E		1222973	Upload Photo	Q26517261
Lancaster House	II	Serene Place, Broadstairs And St. Peters, Broadstairs			11 February 1969	TR3966767775; 51°21′30″N 1°26′28″E		1222974	Upload Photo	Q26517262
The Serene House	II	Serene Place, Broadstairs And St. Peters, Broadstairs			11 February 1969	TR3966667769; 51°21′30″N 1°26′28″E		1267532	Upload Photo	Q26557923
Disused Reservoir	II	South Of Crampton Tower, High Street, Broadstairs And St. Peters, Broadstairs			20 September 1974	TR3911467906; 51°21′36″N 1°26′00″E		1239631	Upload Photo	Q26532599
Barn in the Grounds of Hildersham House	II	St Peter's Road, Broadstairs And St. Peters, St Peters			7 January 1972	TR3840468334; 51°21′50″N 1°25′24″E		1222934	Upload Photo	Q26517228
1 and 3, Stone Road	II	1 and 3, Stone Road, Broadstairs And St. Peters, Broadstairs			24 January 1950	TR3971468148; 51°21′42″N 1°26′31″E		1267533	Upload Photo	Q26557924
7 and 9, Stone Road	II	7 and 9, Stone Road, Broadstairs And St. Peters, Broadstairs			11 February 1969	TR3971668181; 51°21′43″N 1°26′31″E		1267480	Upload Photo	Q26557872
Kingdom Hall of Jehovah's Witnesses	II	11, Stone Road, Broadstairs And St. Peters, Broadstairs			11 February 1969	TR3971968191; 51°21′44″N 1°26′32″E		1223049	Upload Photo	Q26517331
17 and 19, Stone Road	II	17 and 19, Stone Road, Broadstairs And St. Peters, Broadstairs			20 September 1974	TR3973368291; 51°21′47″N 1°26′33″E		1267534	Upload Photo	Q26557925
21, Stone Road	II	21, Stone Road, Broadstairs And St. Peters, Broadstairs			20 September 1974	TR3973668305; 51°21′47″N 1°26′33″E		1267491	Upload Photo	Q26557883
Paragon Lodge	II	Thanet Close, Broadstairs And St. Peters, Broadstairs			20 September 1974	TR3969268172; 51°21′43″N 1°26′30″E		1222975	Upload Photo	Q26517263
The Prospect	II	The Parade, Broadstairs And St. Peters, Broadstairs			20 September 1974	TR3982267869; 51°21′33″N 1°26′36″E		1222614	Upload Photo	Q26516933
9, The Parade	II	9, The Parade, Broadstairs And St. Peters			20 September 1974	TR3982067863; 51°21′33″N 1°26′36″E		1267577	Upload Photo	Q26557967
The Look Out House and Stores	II	The Pier, Harbour Street, Broadstairs And St. Peters, Broadstairs			11 February 1969	TR3996467868; 51°21′33″N 1°26′43″E		1239626	Upload Photo	Q26532594
Lovejoy Cottage	II	Tippledore Lane, Broadstairs, CT10 2TG, Broadstairs And St. Peters			5 May 1972	TR3813768319; 51°21′50″N 1°25′10″E		1222976	Upload Photo	Q26517264
Trinity Cottage	II	1, Trinity Square, Broadstairs And St. Peters, Broadstairs			20 September 1974	TR3895669490; 51°22′27″N 1°25′55″E		1267684	Upload Photo	Q26558064
Albert Cottage	II	7, Tunis Row, Broadstairs And St. Peters, Broadstairs			20 September 1974	TR3976467988; 51°21′37″N 1°26′33″E		1222978	Upload Photo	Q26517266
1 and 2, Union Square	II	1 and 2, Union Square, Broadstairs And St. Peters, Broadstairs			20 September 1974	TR3984867938; 51°21′35″N 1°26′38″E		1267536	Upload Photo	Q26557926
3 and 4, Union Square	II	3 and 4, Union Square, Broadstairs And St. Peters, Broadstairs			20 September 1974	TR3985467956; 51°21′36″N 1°26′38″E		1223063	Upload Photo	Q26517345
5 and 6, Union Square	II	5 and 6, Union Square, Broadstairs And St. Peters, Broadstairs			20 September 1974	TR3986867945; 51°21′36″N 1°26′39″E		1222980	Upload Photo	Q26517268
7, Union Square	II	7, Union Square, Broadstairs And St. Peters, Broadstairs			20 September 1974	TR3986167935; 51°21′35″N 1°26′38″E		1223067	Upload Photo	Q26517349
Little Upton	II	Vale Road, Broadstairs And St. Peters, Upton			20 September 1974	TR3858967738; 51°21′31″N 1°25′32″E		1222986	Upload Photo	Q26517274
The Oast House	II	Vale Road, Broadstairs And St. Peters, Upton			20 September 1974	TR3864767694; 51°21′29″N 1°25′35″E		1267463	Upload Photo	Q26557858
Upton Lodge	II	Vale Road, Broadstairs And St. Peters, Upton			20 September 1974	TR3876967677; 51°21′29″N 1°25′41″E		1223074	Upload Photo	Q26517354
Thaxted Cottage	II	6, Vicarage Street, Broadstairs, CT10 2SG, Broadstairs And St. Peters			20 September 1974	TR3806068384; 51°21′53″N 1°25′06″E		1223075	Upload Photo	Q26517355
Albion House	II	1, Victoria Parade, Broadstairs And St. Peters, Broadstairs			20 September 1974	TR3974067766; 51°21′30″N 1°26′32″E		1223076	Upload Photo	Q26517356
Dickens House	II	2, Victoria Parade, Broadstairs And St. Peters, Broadstairs			24 January 1950	TR3973867757; 51°21′30″N 1°26′32″E		1267465	Upload Photo	Q26557860
Arcadia House	II	3, Victoria Parade, Broadstairs And St. Peters, Broadstairs			11 February 1969	TR3973667751; 51°21′30″N 1°26′31″E		1267440	Upload Photo	Q26557837
Littlewold	II	4, Victoria Parade, Broadstairs And St. Peters, Broadstairs			24 January 1950	TR3973467746; 51°21′29″N 1°26′31″E		1267443	Upload Photo	Q26557840
Vanity Fair	II	15, York Street, Broadstairs And St. Peters, Broadstairs			20 September 1974	TR3965867681; 51°21′27″N 1°26′27″E		1267360	Upload Photo	Q26557764
Wellington House	II	25, York Street, Broadstairs And St. Peters, Broadstairs			20 September 1974	TR3962967644; 51°21′26″N 1°26′26″E		1223352	Upload Photo	Q26517624

== See also ==
- Grade I listed buildings in Kent
- Grade II* listed buildings in Kent

== Sources ==
- Newman, John (2013) [1969], Kent: North-East and East, The Buildings of England, New Haven and London: Yale University Press, ISBN 978-0-300-18506-5
