= Stagecoach South East =

Bus operator based in Canterbury, England

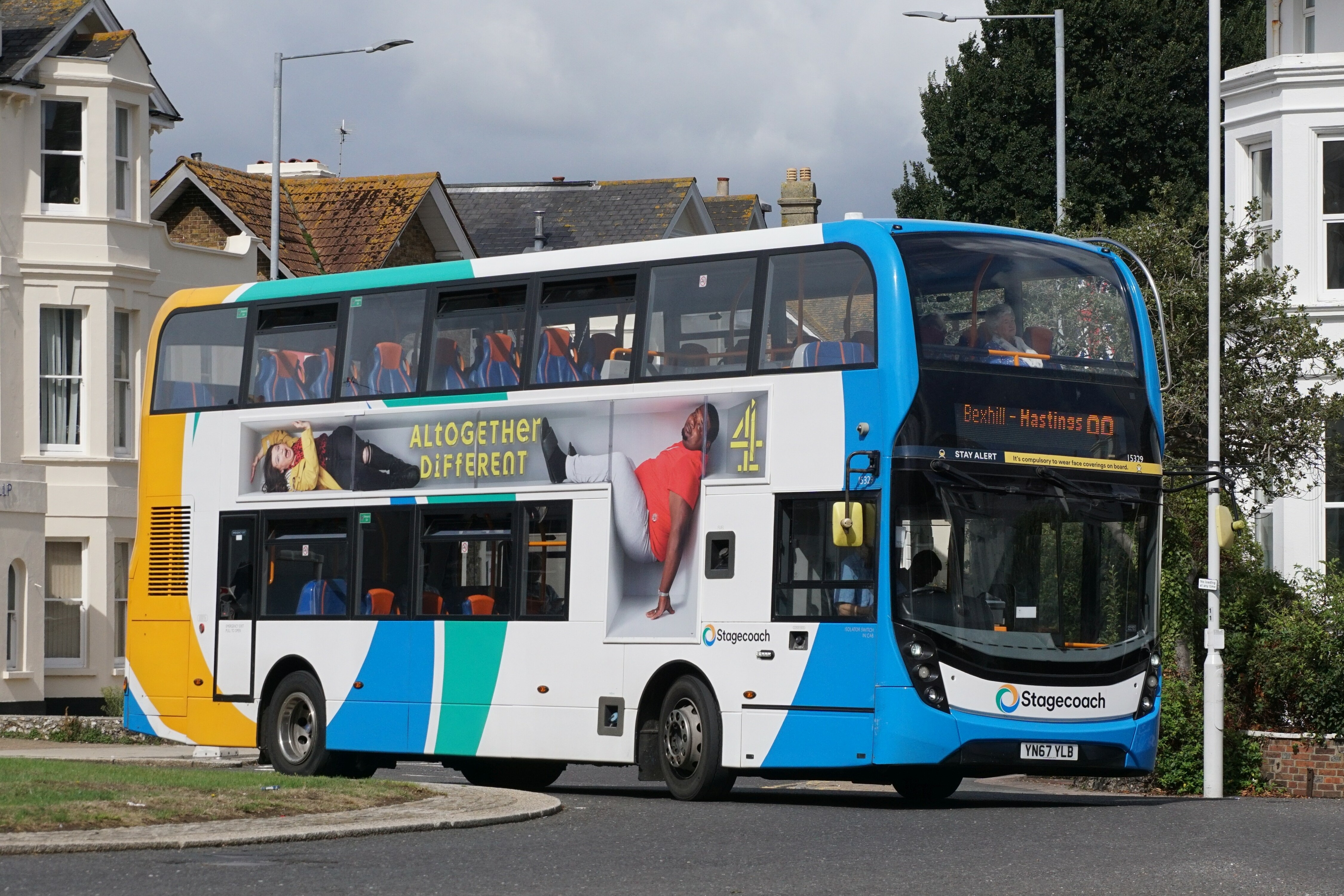
- An Alexander Dennis Enviro400 MMC-bodied Scania N250UD in Eastbourne, September 2022
- Parent: Stagecoach Group
- Founded: 1989
- Headquarters: Canterbury
- Service area: East Sussex; Kent
- Service type: Bus services
- Hubs: Canterbury, Ashford, Hastings, Eastbourne, Ramsgate, Folkestone, Dover
- Depots: 7
- Fleet: 439 (2022)
- Annual ridership: 42.6 million (2018/19)
- Managing Director: Joel Mitchell
- Website: www.stagecoachbus.com

Stagecoach South East is the trading name of East Kent Road Car Company Limited, a bus operator based in Canterbury; it provides services in Kent and East Sussex, in South East England. It is a subsidiary of Stagecoach Group.

== History ==
Stagecoach has been operating in the Hastings area since its takeover of Hastings & District Transport in 1989; it made improvements to the Hastings bus network, in partnership with Hastings Borough Council and East Sussex County Council.

=== Acquisitions ===
East Kent Road Car Company

Stagecoach acquired the East Kent Road Car Company in 1993 and operates many routes with different route branding.

Eastbourne

In early November 2008, local press reported that Eastbourne Buses was to be sold by the end of the year to either the Go-Ahead Group or Stagecoach Group. The employees' trade union, Unite, wrote to Eastbourne Borough Council to ask it to sell to the Go-Ahead Group because of work conditions and a superior fleet. On 25 November 2008, it was announced that Stagecoach was the preferred bidder to purchase. A few days later, it was announced in local press that the takeover had cost £4 million. Stagecoach had run services in the town until late in 2000 before they were withdrawn; at the time of the announcement, it operated services to Hastings and Bexhill from Eastbourne.

The sale caused a lot of controversy, with MPs criticising the secrecy surrounding the sale and blaming each other's parties for the state the Eastbourne Buses got into; the Liberal Democrats claimed that the Conservatives "failed to support Eastbourne Buses." There had also been criticism of the low price the company was sold at - revealed at £3.7 million, lower than the original report of £4 million - and criticism against Stagecoach, with one MP saying that the company has effectively been "given away for nothing." However, it was revealed that Go-Ahead had bid much lower at £2.85 million, so the council had to sell to Stagecoach to serve the taxpayer due to the £1.2 million difference in bids, despite the union's calls.

Cavendish Motor

In January 2009, Cavendish Motor Services were bought by Stagecoach Group; subsequently, it announced redundancies for Cavendish staff. The company was then merged with Eastbourne Buses and rebranded Stagecoach.

On 13 May 2009, the Office of Fair Trading announced that it was referring the purchase of Eastbourne Buses and Cavendish Motor Services by Stagecoach to the Competition Commission. Although the provisional decision found that the acquisitions had substantially lessened competition, the Competition Commission cleared the purchase in October 2009 after deciding that Cavendish would have chosen either to reduce its services substantially or even to close its operations altogether following Stagecoach's acquisition of Eastbourne Buses.

Eastonways

Eastonways was an independent bus and coach operator providing regular bus services in and around Thanet, Kent. The company's services, either fully or partly funded by Kent County Council, operated regularly in Margate, Westgate, Broadstairs, St Peters, Ramsgate and surrounding villages: Birchington, Acol, Manston, Minster & Monkton. In March 2012, six of their buses were set alight at the company's depot in Ramsgate in an act of arson. In October 2013, the company was placed in liquidation and most routes were taken over by Stagecoach, on behalf of Kent County Council.

Until July 2017, Stagecoach operated National Express coach routes 007, 021 and 022, which were then taken over by The Kings Ferry. East Kent had operated services from Kent to Victoria Coach Station since 1932.

Fastrack

On 17 November 2024, Stagecoach South East started operating the Fastrack D service between Dover and Whitfield using 5 Alexander Dennis Enviro200 MMC vehicles. By 2026, a fleet of 5 new Volvo BZL electric buses will be introduced across the network.

== Fleet and Vehicles ==
As of 2026, the Stagecoach South East fleet consists of 373 buses.

=== Vehicle History ===
Around 2006, new Optare Solo and Alexander ALX300s were introduced on the local Hastings Arrows routes for better connectivity throughout Hastings and St. Leonards. They were replaced on 19 April 2012, following the introduction of Alexander Dennis Enviro200 Darts.

On 22 January 2012, 11 new Alexander Dennis Enviro400-bodied Scania N230UDs were introduced on The Wave 99 that runs between Hastings and Eastbourne via Bexhill and Pevensey Bay.

On 19 April 2012, 23 new Alexander Dennis Enviro200 Darts were introduced on the local Hastings Arrow routes.

On 31 October 2014, a fleet of ten new Scania N230UD Alexander Dennis Enviro400 buses were introduced to upgrade route 16 between Canterbury and Hythe to Stagecoach Gold operation.

In April and May 2016, a large fleet of new Scania N250UD Alexander Dennis Enviro400 MMC buses were introduced onto routes 8, 8A and 8X between Canterbury and Westwood Cross and onto the Triangle service between Canterbury and Herne Bay.

On 23 July 2016, Stagecoach South East introduced new open-top route 69 in Thanet, operating between Ramsgate and Broadstairs. Two TransBus Trident Alexander ALX400 buses were converted to open-top to operate the service.

On 5 December 2016, a fleet of 25 new Alexander Dennis Enviro400 MMC buses were introduced onto Wave routes 100, 101 and 102 between Hastings, Rye and Dover, via Camber, Lydd, New Romney and Folkestone. A further fleet of 12 new Scania N250UD Alexander Dennis Enviro400 MMC buses entered service on Wave route 99 between Eastbourne and Hastings in January 2018.

In June 2019, a new fleet of 24 Alexander Dennis Enviro200 MMC buses were introduced onto the Thanet Loop service which operates in a circular route on the Isle of Thanet.

== Routes ==
=== Local and inter-urban services ===
Stagecoach South East operates a mixture of local and interurban services across Kent and East Sussex. Bus services are provided in and around the towns of Canterbury, Ashford, Ramsgate, Margate, Folkestone, Dover, New Romney, Lydd, Rye, Tenterden, Northiam, Hawkhurst, Hastings, Bexhill-on-Sea, Pevensey and Eastbourne, as well as a 1066 (originally 304/305) Stagecoach route to Tunbridge Wells from Hastings, which crosses the East Sussex / Kent border thrice on full journeys.

The company also operates a number of high profile branded inter-urban services.

==== The Wave ====
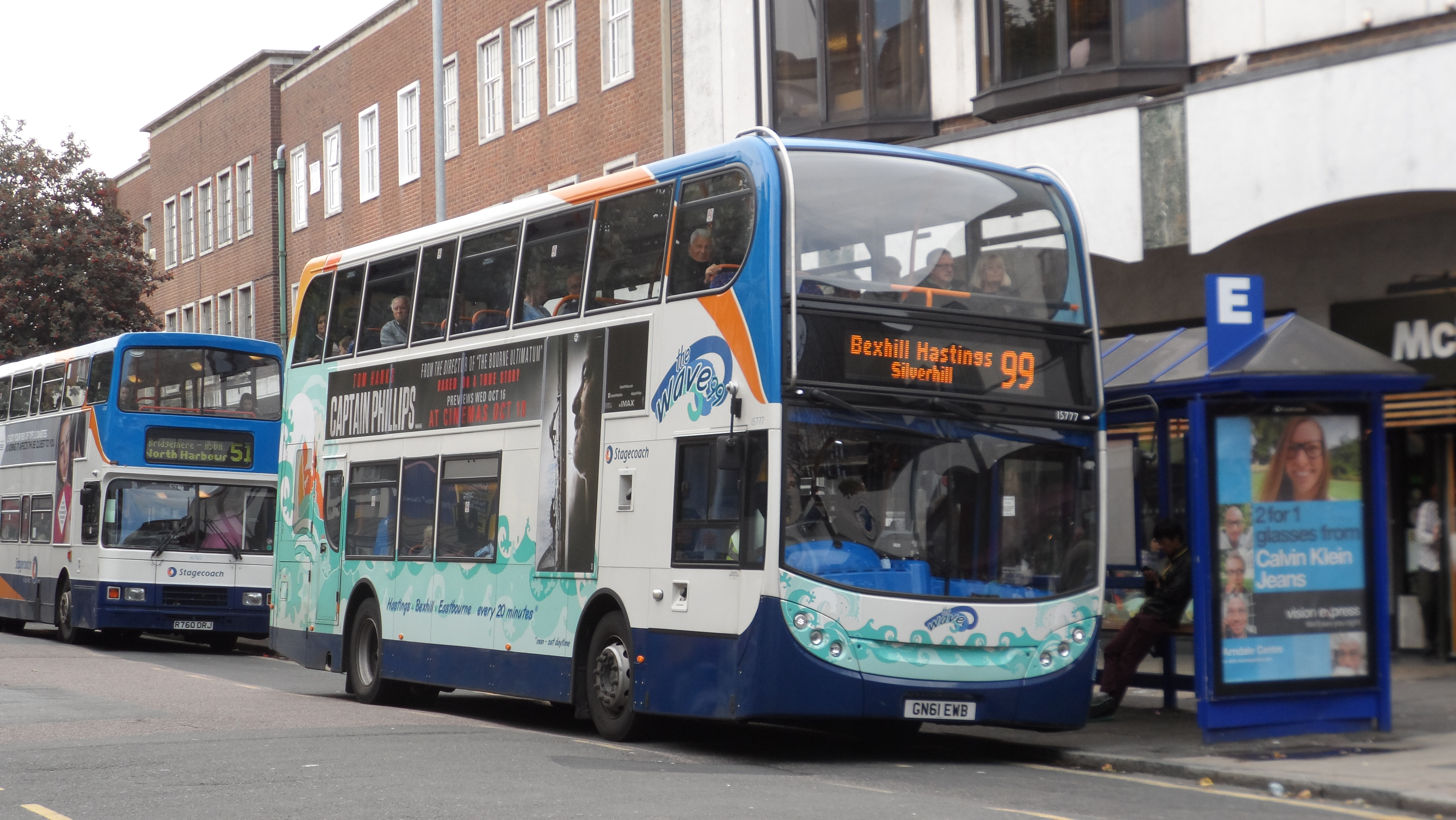
An Alexander Dennis Enviro400 on Wave route 99 in Eastbourne

Wave is the brand given to services along the south-east coast. The network is currently formed of seven routes, which form a coastal corridor between Eastbourne and Dover:

- Route 99 runs between Eastbourne and Hastings, via Bexhill-on-Sea
- Routes 100/101 run between Hastings and Rye/New Romney via either Icklesham or Fairlight
- Routes 102/103 run between Lydd/Lydd-on-Sea and Folkestone, via New Romney, Dymchurch & Hythe.
- Routes 104/105 run between Dover and Folkestone/Hythe, via Capel-le-Ferne

Services are generally operated using Wave-branded Alexander Dennis Enviro400 MMC buses, although a number of these are currently being repainted into the new Stagecoach local livery.

==== Stagecoach Gold 16 ====
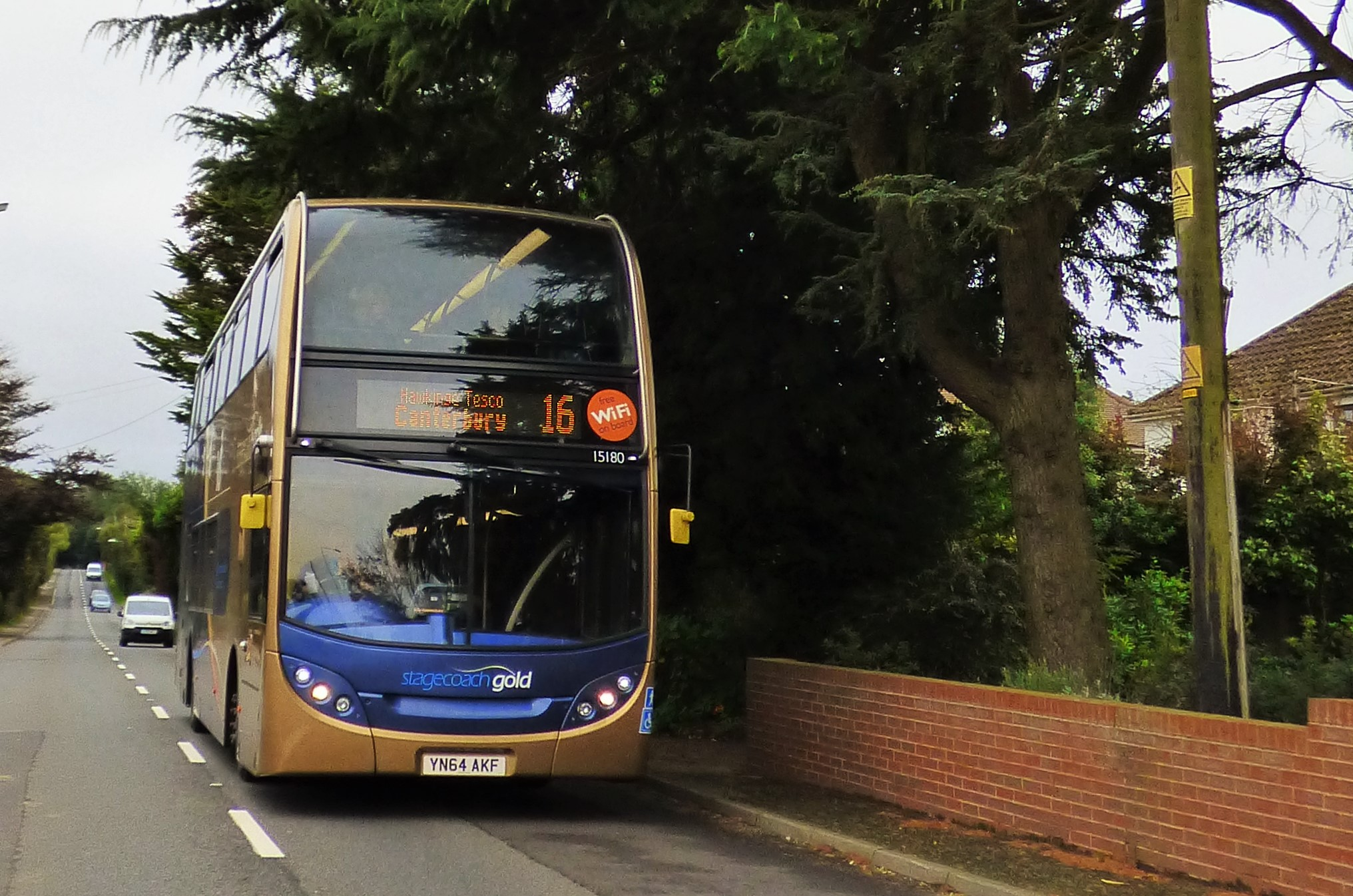
A Scania N230UD Alexander Dennis Enviro400 on Gold route 16

Route 16, which operates between Canterbury and Hythe via Denton, Hawkinge and Folkestone, was part of the premium Stagecoach Gold brand. Services were operated using Scania N230UD Alexander Dennis Enviro400, with free WiFi and leather seats. However during 2023, 11 new Alexander Dennis Enviro400 MMC buses were introduced onto this route, displacing the Gold Scania N230UD Alexander Dennis Enviro400 onto other routes. These were then transferred to East Scotland at the beginning of 2024

==== The Breeze ====
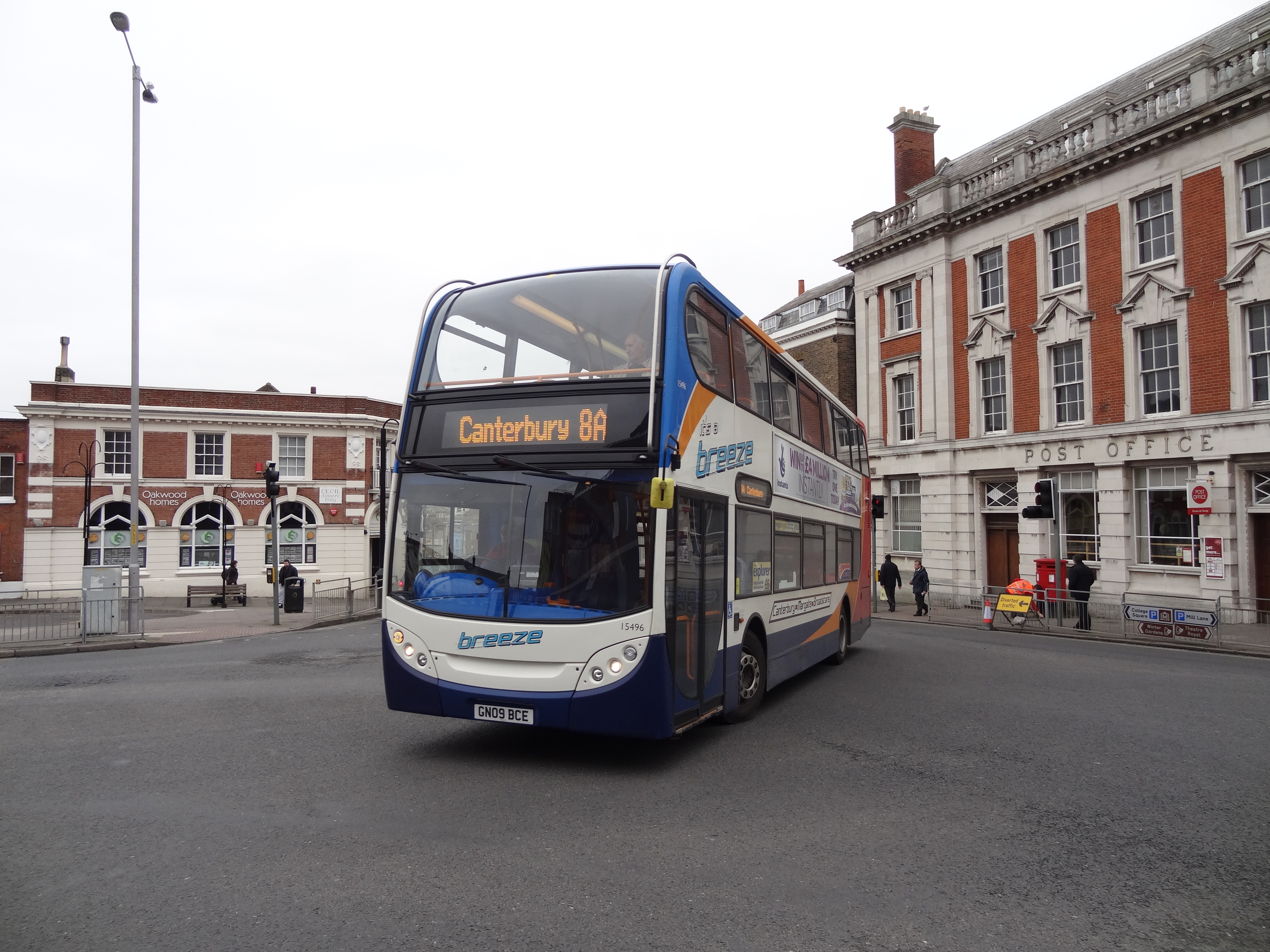
An Alexander Dennis Enviro400 on Breeze route 8A in Margate

Routes 8, 8A and 8X, which operate between Canterbury and Westwood Cross via Birchington-on-Sea and Margate, are branded as The Breeze.

Services are operated using Breeze-branded Scania N250UD Alexander Dennis Enviro400 MMC buses, although a number of these are currently being repainted into the new Stagecoach local livery.

==== The Triangle ====
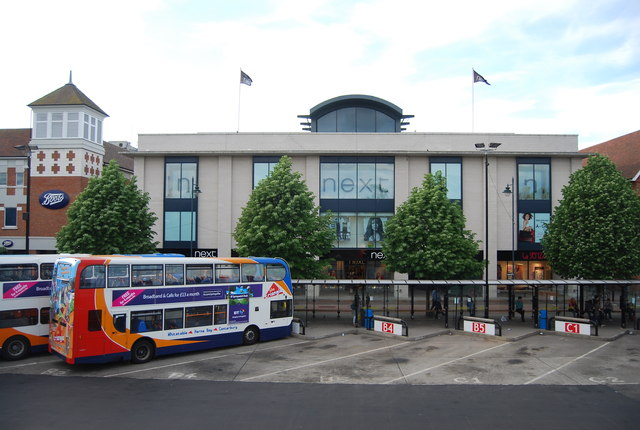
An Alexander Dennis Enviro400 on The Triangle at Canterbury

The Triangle was a high-profile branded service running in a circular route between Canterbury, Whitstable and Herne Bay.

Services are generally operated using Scania N250UD Alexander Dennis Enviro400 MMC buses in the Stagecoach local livery, which were formerly branded for the Triangle.

However, the route was debranded and split into four different routes: the 400, 401, 600 and 601, while route 6 was rebranded into the 602 and 603.

=== Canterbury Park & Ride ===
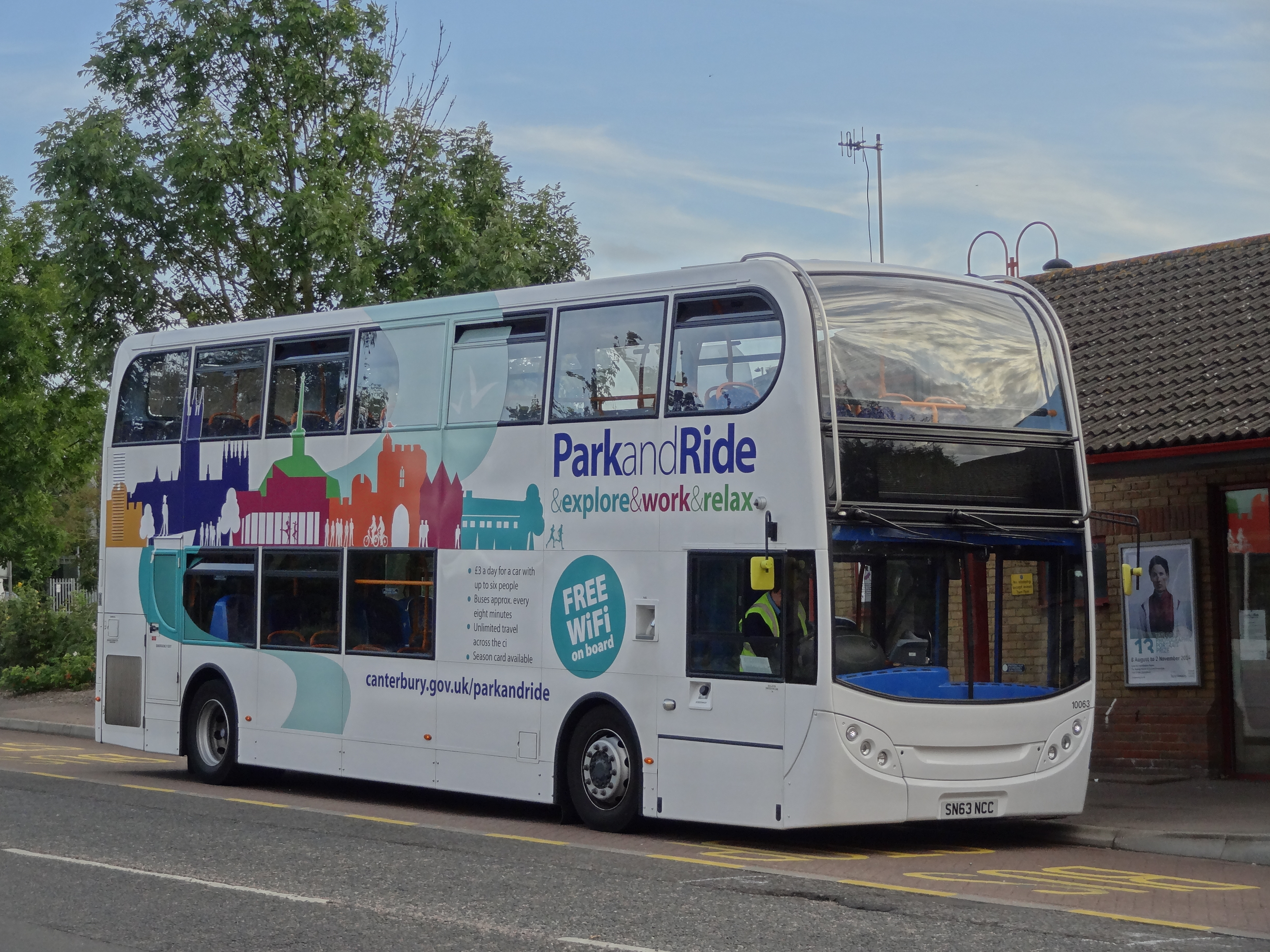
An Alexander Dennis Enviro400 working a Canterbury Park & Ride service

Stagecoach South East also operate the Canterbury Park & Ride service on behalf of Canterbury City Council.

Buses operate frequently from Canterbury city centre to three Park & Ride sites at Sturry Road, Wincheap and New Dover Road.

=== UniBus ===
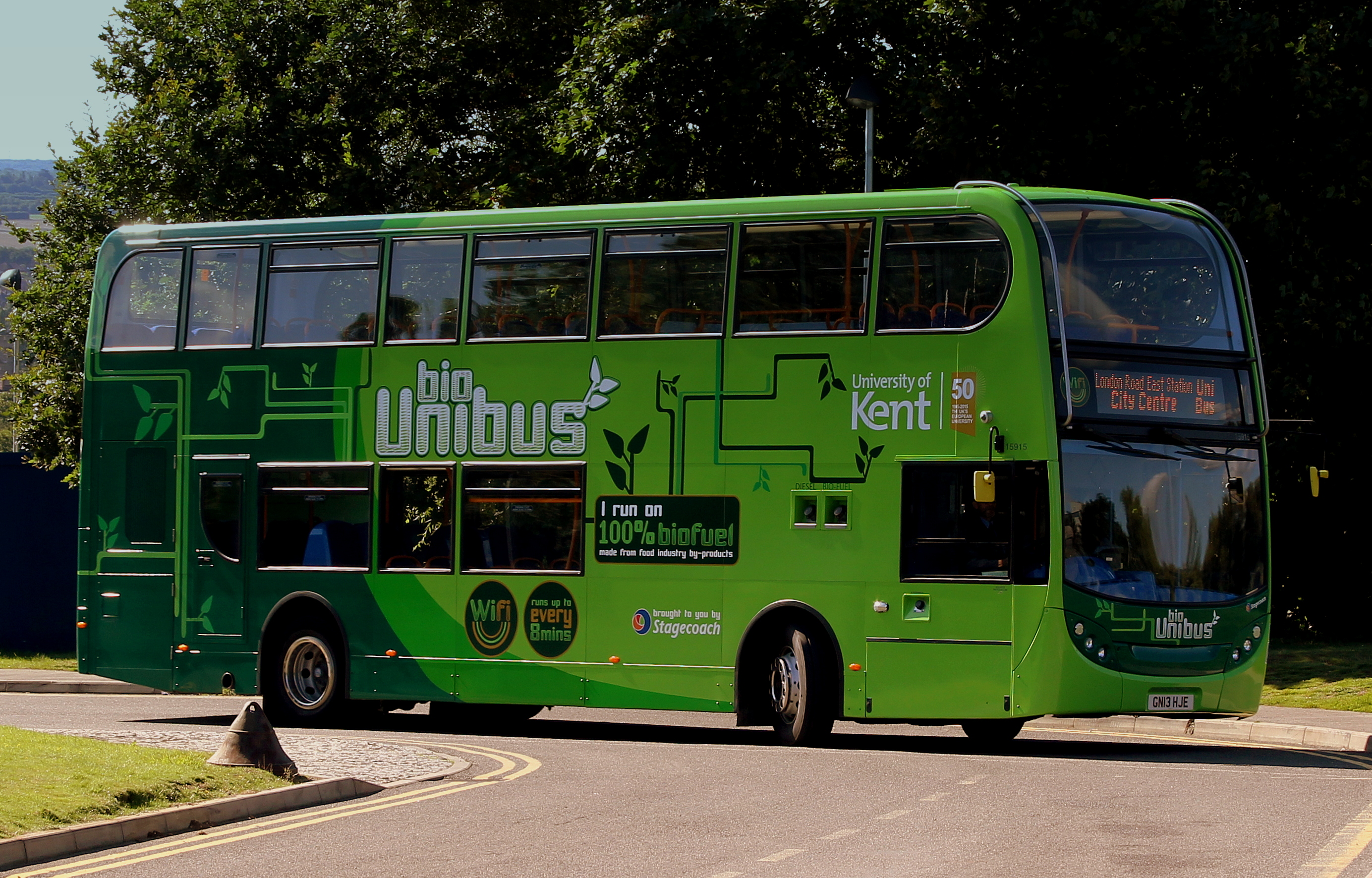
An Alexander Dennis Enviro400 working a UniBus service

Stagecoach South East operates the UniBus service, in partnership with The University of Kent. The network is formed of two routes, the Uni1 and Uni2, which connect Canterbury city centre with the university campuses.

=== Stagecoach Connect ===
Stagecoach also operates a demand-responsive service called Stagecoach Connect in Aylesham and Whitfield.

== Depots ==
Stagecoach South East currently operates services from six bus depots and one outstation across Kent and East Sussex:

- Herne Bay
- Ashford
- Thanet
- Dover
- Hastings
- Eastbourne
- Old Romney (outstation)

== See also ==
- List of bus operators of the United Kingdom
