= Eastbourne Buses =

Bus operator in Eastbourne, England

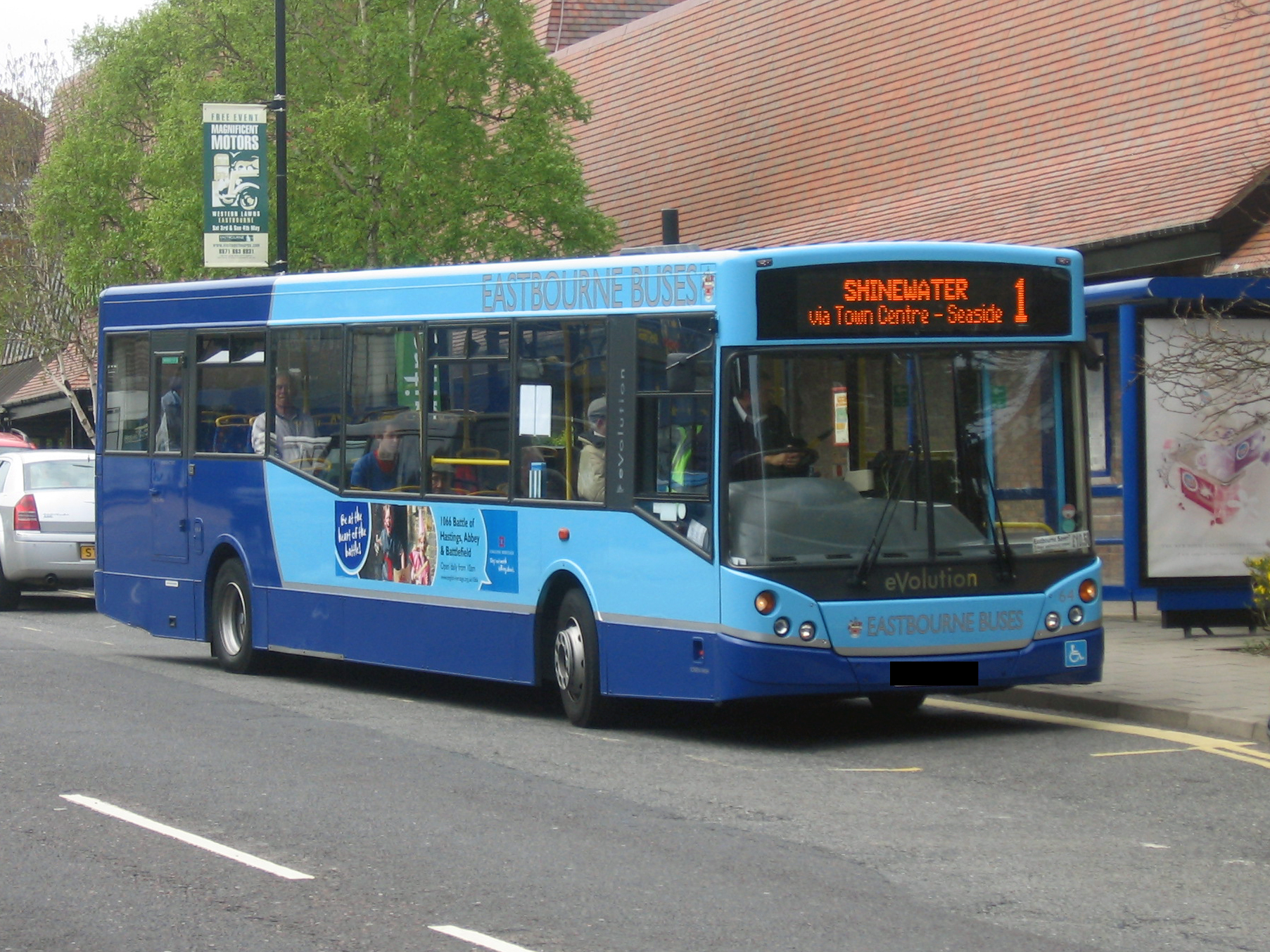
- MCV Evolution bodied MAN 14.220 in 2008
- Parent: Eastbourne Borough Council (80%); Keolis (20%)
- Founded: 1903
- Defunct: 2008
- Headquarters: Birch Road
- Locale: Borough of Eastbourne
- Service area: Eastbourne, Hailsham, Tunbridge Wells, Uckfield, East Grinstead
- Service type: Bus service
- Routes: 10
- Fleet: 61
- Website: Eastbourne Buses website

Eastbourne Buses was a bus operator running within the Borough of Eastbourne and into the surrounding area, including Pevensey, Hailsham, Tunbridge Wells, Uckfield, and East Grinstead, with a fleet of around 50 vehicles. Eastbourne Buses was sold to the Stagecoach Group on 18 December 2008 for £3.7 million, beating Go-Ahead to the ownership.

== History ==
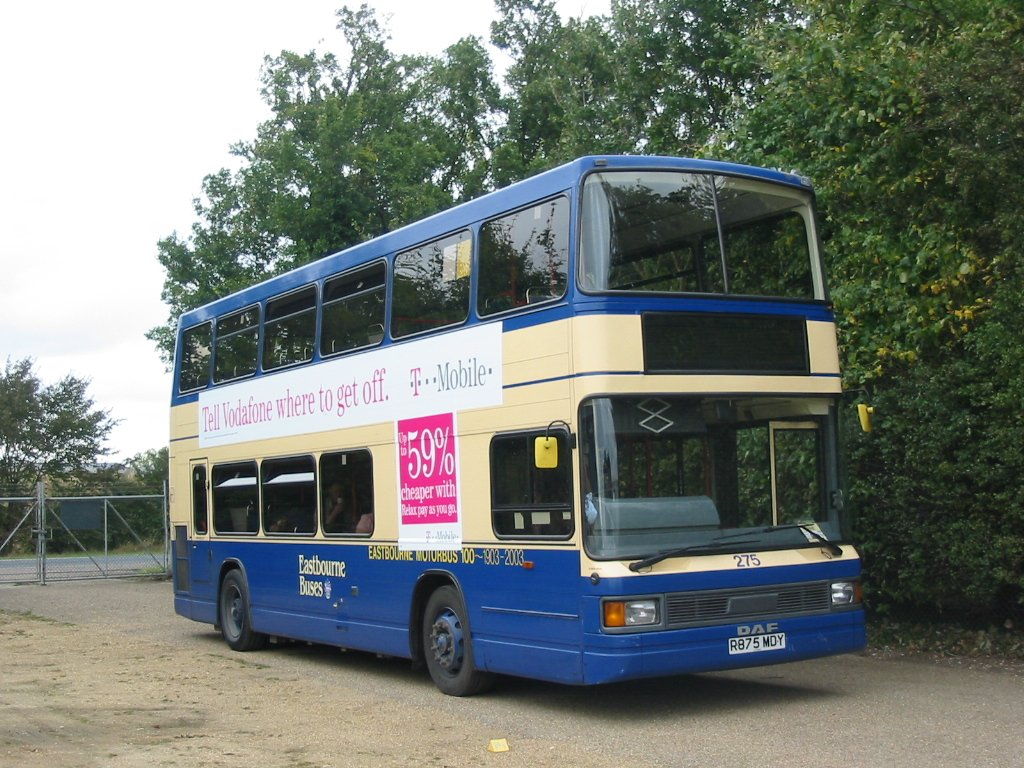
Optare Spectra bodied DAF DB250 at Showbus 2004

Formed in April 1903, Eastbourne Buses claimed to be the first and oldest municipally owned motor bus operator in the world; the first bus service operated between Eastbourne railway station and Eastbourne's Old Town.

In the months before the operator's eventual sale, the operational future of Eastbourne Buses had become increasingly uncertain due to a lack of funding from Eastbourne Borough Council. In April 2007 the company nearly had to cease operations as it was unable to pay for fuel, and the following September, the company would be fined over £25,000 for two accidents involving employees, one of which was fatal. At the beginning of 2008, the traffic commissioner fined the company for failing to run services on time.

=== Sale to Stagecoach ===
In June 2008, it was reported that the borough council intended to sell its 80% majority shareholding in the company. By November, local press reports had indicated that the company was to be sold by the end of the year to either the Go-Ahead Group or the Stagecoach Group. The employees' trade union, Unite, wrote to Eastbourne Borough Council to ask the Council to sell to the Go-Ahead Group, because of work conditions and a superior fleet.

On 25 November 2008, it was announced that Stagecoach was the preferred bidder, and on 18 December 2008, Stagecoach took control of the operations of Eastbourne Buses, initially reported as being for an undisclosed sum. The following month, rival company Cavendish Motor Services was also bought by Stagecoach, with the companies subsequently merged.

The sale has caused considerable controversy, with MPs criticising the secrecy surrounding the sale and blaming each other's parties for the state the Eastbourne Buses got into, the Liberal Democrats claiming the Conservatives "failed to support Eastbourne Buses". There was also criticism of the low sale price for the company – revealed at £3.7 million, lower than the original report of 4 - and criticism of Stagecoach, one MP saying that the company has effectively been "given away for nothing". However, it was revealed that Go-Ahead had bid much lower at £2.85 million, so the council was forced to sell to Stagecoach, despite the union's calls.

The Eastbourne Buses name was discontinued by Stagecoach on 8 March 2009, with operations rebranded as Stagecoach in Eastbourne. This too was discontinued, with operations now managed under the group's Stagecoach South East subsidiary.

== See also ==
- List of bus operators of the United Kingdom
