= Cavendish Motor Services =

English bus operator

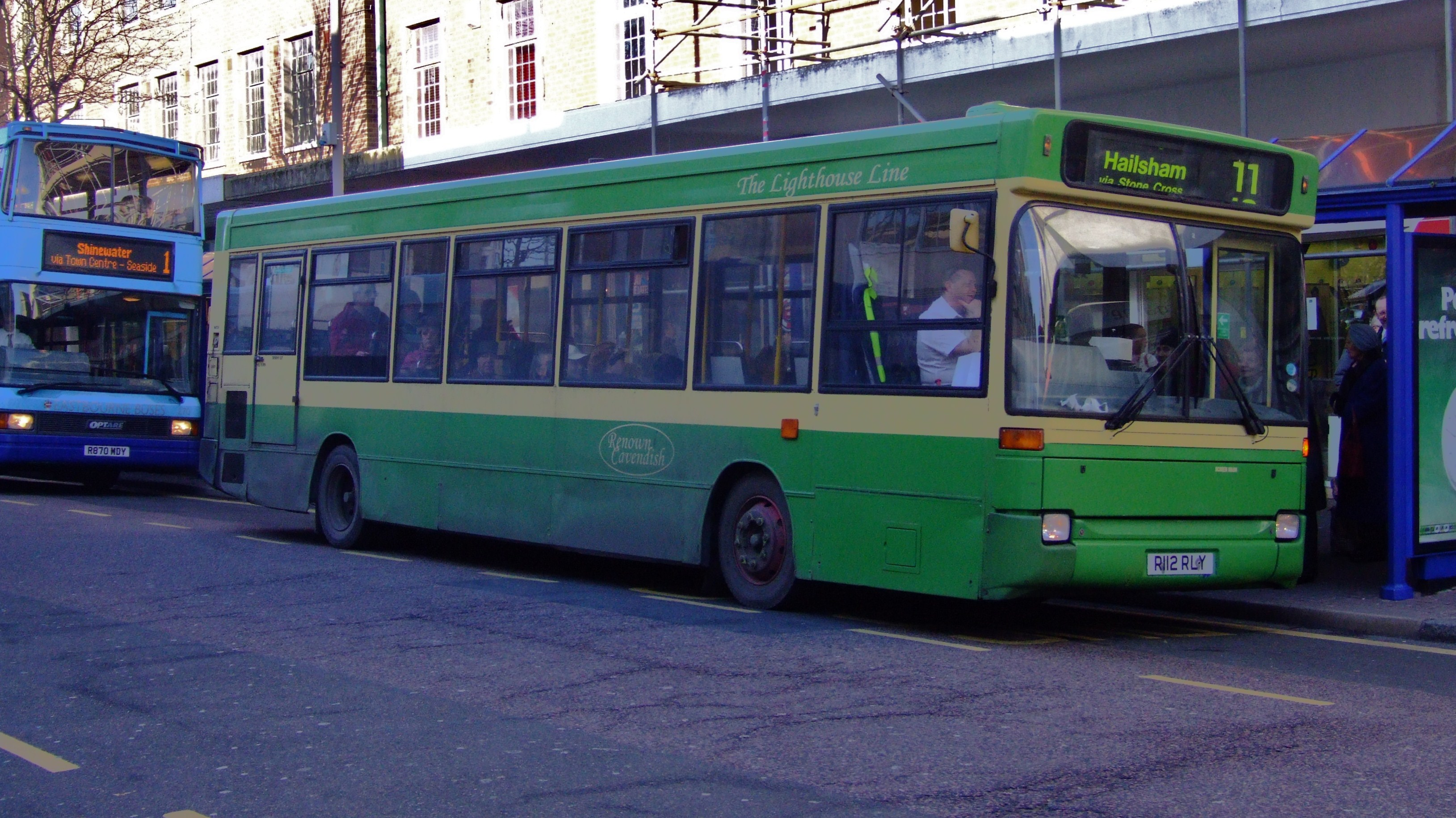
- A Cavendish Motor Services Dennis Dart SLF in Eastbourne on route 11, shortly before Stagecoach Group acquired the company.
- Parent: Stagecoach Group
- Founded: 2006
- Defunct: 2009
- Headquarters: Polegate & Eastbourne
- Locale: East Sussex
- Service area: Eastbourne
- Service type: bus service
- Alliance: Eastbourne Buses
- Hubs: Eastbourne, Polegate & Hailsham
- Fleet: fleet list
- Operator: Stagecoach Group
- Website: www.cavendishmotorservices.co.uk

Cavendish Motor Services was a bus operator running within the Borough of Eastbourne and the surrounding area such as Polegate and Hailsham. It was the sister company of Renown Coaches of Bexhill. The buses ran in a distinctive green and cream livery, similar to the pre-1968 Southdown Motor Services livery.

In January 2009, Cavendish Motor Services were sold to the Stagecoach Group, along with rival bus company Eastbourne Buses. The launch of a combined network branded as Stagecoach in Eastbourne was delayed following a lengthy inquiry by the Competition Commission, which finally permitted this in October 2009. Cavendish's parent company, Renown Coaches, has retained its separate identity and ownership.

== History ==
Cavendish Motor Services started operations on 13 March 2006.

Initially they ran just two routes:

- route 10 from Eastbourne Old Town (bottom of Central Avenue) to The Crumbles ASDA via the Town Centre and Seaside
- route 11 from Eastbourne Old Town to Hailsham Town Centre via the Town Centre, Seaside and Stone Cross.

Gradually more routes were added to their network, and routes which initially only ran on weekdays were expanded to run on Saturdays as well (Cavendish never operated services on Sundays). On 5 September 2008, service 9 which had run between Sainsbury's in Hampden Park, Eastbourne's District General Hospital, Cherry Garden Road, the Town Centre and Meads was withdrawn. The route was replaced by re-routing service 10 between Hill Road and Old Town, and providing a new service 20 from Meads to Langney from Monday 8 September. However, on 1 December 2008, service 9 was re-instated between Meads and the hospital, but running between the Town Centre and the hospital via a different route.

== Sale to Stagecoach ==
In January 2009, Cavendish Motor Services was sold to Stagecoach Group. This came a month after the group bought rival bus company Eastbourne Buses. Because of this, tickets for either company were accepted on both sets of services, but not on the Stagecoach-branded Hastings buses. The sum Stagecoach paid for the company has not been revealed.

Stagecoach later announced 40 job losses.

== Fares ==
Since starting operations, the normal fares on Cavendish services were set lower than those of their main rival, Eastbourne Buses: initially at an introductory £1 fare, although that was quickly increased to £1.30. This difference was maintained in subsequent fare rises.

== Services ==
Cavendish worked with their parent company Renown Coaches to run services to Hailsham and Seaford via Polegate. Some routes were in direct competition with parts of the Eastbourne Buses network: in at least two cases services withdrawn by Eastbourne Buses were partially re-instated by the firm, which has given them some additional public support.

== See also ==
- List of bus operators of the United Kingdom
- Eastbourne Buses
