= Westwood, Kent =

Village and retail estate in Kent, England

Coordinates: 51.362°N 1.395°E

Westwood
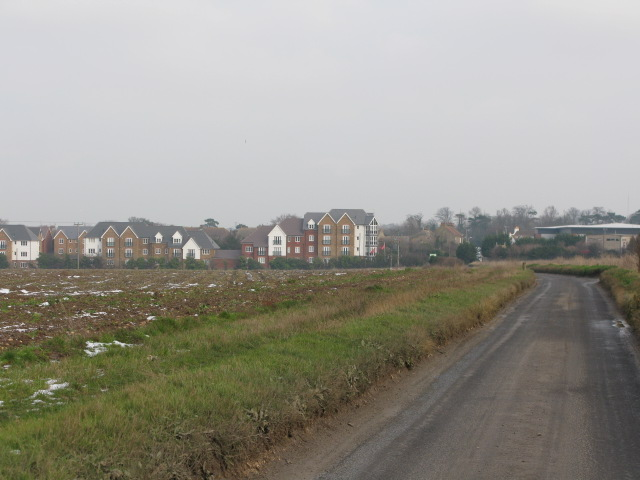
- View along unnamed road in direction of Nash Road

- Location within Kent
- Population: 1,000
- OS grid reference: TR357685
- Civil parish: Broadstairs and St Peter's
- District: Thanet
- Shire county: Kent
- Region: South East
- Country: England
- Sovereign state: United Kingdom
- Post town: MARGATE
- Postcode district: CT9
- Dialling code: 01843
- Police: Kent
- Fire: Kent
- Ambulance: South East Coast
- UK Parliament: East Thanet

Westwood is a village and retail estate in Thanet district of Kent, England, and 1.9 miles (3.1 km) south of Margate.

== History ==
Westwood developed on the road between Margate and Ramsgate (now designated the A254). Most of the village is in the civil parish of Broadstairs and St Peter's.

Haine Hospital opened as an isolation hospital in 1902. A 2015 car park collapse beneath the Westwood Cross Primark store revealed underground tunnels believed to have been constructed during World War I training exercises. Researchers suggested they were subsequently used as air raid shelters for servicemen at the hospital and then sealed up.

The village became a focus for retail development towards the end of the 20th century, and is now designated as the main retail centre for Thanet.

== Economy ==
Shopping centres in Westwood include Land Securities' Westwood Cross, and Hammerson's East Kent Retail Park and Westwood Gateway Retail Park.

== Notable residents ==
Entertainers Kate and Harry Rickards had a country home called "Westwood Lodge" in the village in the early 1900s.
