= Westwood Cross =

Shopping centre near Broadstairs, England

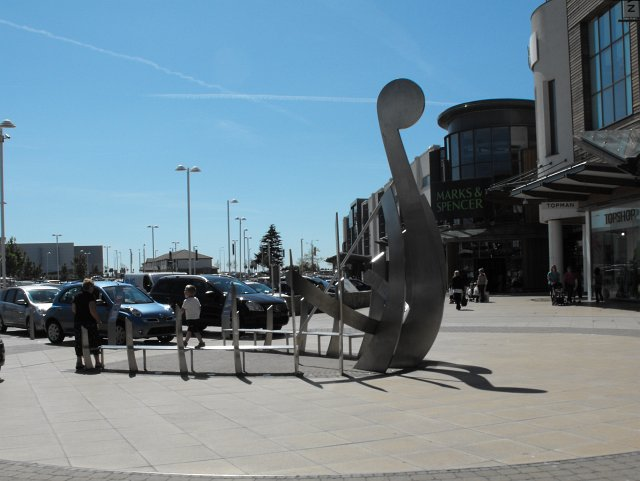
- Sundial seat at Westwood Cross
- Location: Westwood, Kent
- Coordinates: 51.360°N 1.393°E
- Opened: June 2005
- Developer: Carillion Richardson Partnership
- Owner: Land Securities
- Num. of stores: 46
- Floor area: 475,000 sq ft (44,100 m^{2})
- Floors: 3
- Parking: 1,500 spaces
- Website: Official website

Westwood Cross is an open, pedestrianised shopping centre located at Westwood, Kent, England. It opened in 2005, and since 2008 has incorporated a casino, bowling alley cinema and bingo hall.

== History ==
Westwood Cross is situated on the site of the former Haine Hospital, which closed in June 1997 and was demolished in 2003. Construction required filling of a 10 metres (33 ft) deep railway cutting.

Developers claimed that Westwood Cross created 1,500 jobs in the Broadstairs area.

Kent County Council's decision to allow a 2008 expansion including leisure and gambling facilities was controversial. Church leaders said its location was tempting people who had never gambled before to give it a go. The scheme was eventually approved by the House of Lords.

In 2010, additional retail outlets were created by conversion of a former adjoining Wickes store.

A 2015 car park collapse beneath the Westwood Cross Primark store revealed underground tunnels believed to have been constructed during World War I training exercises. Researchers suggested they were subsequently used as air raid shelters for servicemen at Haine Hospital, and then sealed up.

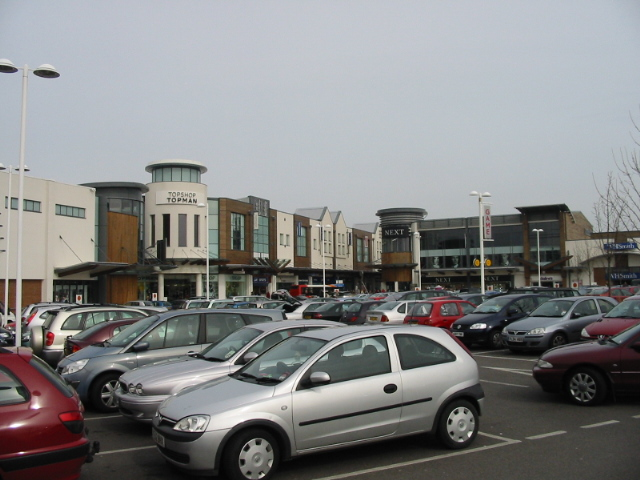
Westwood Cross shopping centre

Kent Police put a 48 hour dispersal order on Westwood Cross in 2022 to control anti-social behaviour. The extra police powers were introduced after reports of teens abusing shop staff, shoplifting and nuisance e-scooter issues.
